= 2008 Penn State Nittany Lions football team =

American college football season

2008 Penn State Nittany Lions football

Big Ten co-champion Lambert-Meadowlands Trophy

Rose Bowl, L 24–38 vs. USC
- Conference: Big Ten Conference

Ranking
- Coaches: No. 8
- AP: No. 8
- Record: 11–2 (7–1 Big Ten)
- Head coach: Joe Paterno (43rd season)
- Offensive coordinator: Galen Hall (5th season)
- Offensive scheme: Spread
- Defensive coordinator: Tom Bradley (9th season)
- Base defense: 4–3
- Captains: Josh Gaines; Anthony Scirrotto; A. Q. Shipley; Derrick Williams; Sean Lee (honorary)
- Home stadium: Beaver Stadium

2008 Big Ten Conference football standings
	Conf.			Overall
Team	W		L	W		L
No. 8 Penn State $+	7	–	1	11	–	2
No. 9 Ohio State %+	7	–	1	10	–	3
No. 24 Michigan State	6	–	2	9	–	4
Northwestern	5	–	3	9	–	4
No. 20 Iowa	5	–	3	9	–	4
Wisconsin	3	–	5	7	–	6
Minnesota	3	–	5	7	–	6
Illinois	3	–	5	5	–	7
Purdue	2	–	6	4	–	8
Michigan	2	–	6	3	–	9
Indiana	1	–	7	3	–	9
$ – BCS representative as conference champion; % – BCS at-large representative; + – Conference co-champions; Rankings from AP Poll

The 2008 Penn State Nittany Lions football team represented the Pennsylvania State University in the 2008 NCAA Division I FBS football season. The team was coached by Joe Paterno and played its home games in Beaver Stadium in University Park, Pennsylvania.

== Preseason ==
Prior to the end of the previous season, linebacker Sean Lee announced his plans to return for his senior season. However, Lee tore his anterior cruciate ligament in his right knee during practice and was sidelined for the entire season. Lee used his available redshirt and returned for the 2009 season.

In January, junior cornerback Justin King announced that he was going to declare for the 2008 NFL draft, skipping his final year of eligibility. King had graduated the previous semester with a degree in liberal arts with an emphasis in sports management. According to King's stepfather and high school coach, "He wanted to get an education and a degree from Penn State, which he did. He wanted to help turn Penn State around, and he did that, too."

Despite the injury, Lee was named one of the team's captains for 2008. Also elected captains by their teammates were center A. Q. Shipley, receiver Derrick Williams, safety Anthony Scirrotto and defensive end Josh Gaines. All five are seniors.

=== Recruiting class ===
The Nittany Lions received 14 letters of intent on National Signing Day, February 6, 2008.

College recruiting information
Name	Hometown	School	Height	Weight	40^{‡}	Commit date
Brandon Beachum; RB	Youngstown, Ohio	Cardinal Mooney HS	6 ft 1 in (1.85 m)	220 lb (100 kg)	4.65	Jul 29, 2007
Brandon Beachum; RB	Recruit ratings: Scout: Rivals: (78)					
Jack Crawford; DE	Richland, New Jersey	St. Augustine Prep	6 ft 6 in (1.98 m)	250 lb (110 kg)	4.55	Aug 26, 2007
Jack Crawford; DE	Recruit ratings: Scout: Rivals: (68)					
Mike Farrell; OT	Pittsburgh	Shady Side Academy Senior School	6 ft 5 in (1.96 m)	272 lb (123 kg)	5.45	Jan 22, 2008
Mike Farrell; OT	Recruit ratings: Scout: Rivals: (75)					
D'Anton Lynn; S	Celina, Texas	Celina HS	6 ft 1 in (1.85 m)	177 lb (80 kg)	4.50	Nov 10, 2007
D'Anton Lynn; S	Recruit ratings: Scout: Rivals: (79)					
Pete Massaro; DE	Newtown Square, Pennsylvania	Marple Newtown SHS	6 ft 4 in (1.93 m)	245 lb (111 kg)	4.75	Aug 20, 2007
Pete Massaro; DE	Recruit ratings: Scout: Rivals: (77)					
Michael Mauti; MLB	Mandeville, Louisiana	Mandeville HS	6 ft 1 in (1.85 m)	220 lb (100 kg)	4.60	Jun 23, 2007
Michael Mauti; MLB	Recruit ratings: Scout: Rivals: (82)					
Deon'tae Pannell; OT	Beverly Hills, Michigan	Wylie E. Groves HS	6 ft 5 in (1.96 m)	305 lb (138 kg)	5.4	Aug 10, 2007
Deon'tae Pannell; OT	Recruit ratings: Scout: Rivals: (40)					
A.J. Price; WR	Reston, Virginia	South Lakes HS	6 ft 4 in (1.93 m)	175 lb (79 kg)	4.50	Jan 21, 2008
A.J. Price; WR	Recruit ratings: Scout: Rivals: (79)					
Matt Stankiewitch; OG	Schuylkill Haven, Pennsylvania	Blue Mountain HS	6 ft 4 in (1.93 m)	290 lb (130 kg)	5.2	Apr 14, 2007
Matt Stankiewitch; OG	Recruit ratings: Scout: Rivals: (78)					
James Terry; DT	Wilmington, Delaware	Brandywine HS	6 ft 3 in (1.91 m)	294 lb (133 kg)	5.2	Jul 28, 2007
James Terry; DT	Recruit ratings: Scout: Rivals: (74)					
Brandon Ware; DT	Harrisburg, Pennsylvania	Harrisburg HS	6 ft 4 in (1.93 m)	340 lb (150 kg)	5.44	Jan 27, 2008
Brandon Ware; DT	Recruit ratings: Scout: Rivals: (40)					
Mark Wedderburn; TE	Springfield Township, Delaware County, Pennsylvania	Cardinal O'Hara HS	6 ft 5 in (1.96 m)	235 lb (107 kg)	4.60	Nov 27, 2007
Mark Wedderburn; TE	Recruit ratings: Scout: Rivals: (78)					
Mike Yancich; WLB	Washington, Pennsylvania	Trinity SHS	6 ft 3 in (1.91 m)	219 lb (99 kg)	4.50	Jun 26, 2007
Mike Yancich; WLB	Recruit ratings: Scout: Rivals: (78)					
Michael Zordich; MLB	Youngstown, Ohio	Cardinal Mooney HS	6 ft 2 in (1.88 m)	210 lb (95 kg)	4.7	Jun 1, 2007
Michael Zordich; MLB	Recruit ratings: Scout: Rivals: (79)					
Overall recruit ranking: Scout: 41 Rivals: 42
‡ Refers to 40-yard dash; Note: In many cases, Scout, Rivals, 247Sports, On3, and ESPN may conflict in their listings of height, weight and 40 time.; In these cases, the average was taken. ESPN grades are on a 100-point scale.; Sources: "Penn State Commit List for 2008". Rivals.; "Scout.com Football Recruiting: Penn State". Scout.; "RecruitTracker 2008: Penn State". ESPN.; "Scout.com Team Recruiting Rankings". Scout.; "2008 Team Ranking". Rivals.com.

=== Spring practice ===
A record crowd of 73,000 fans attended the annual Blue-White scrimmage at Beaver Stadium on April 19, surpassing the previous year's record of 71,000. The Blue squad won 27–14. Redshirt freshman running back Stephfon Green opened up the scoring for White, taking his first handoff 57 yards for a touchdown. Green finished the game with 87 yards on 12 carries, a 7.2 yard per carry average. Tight end Andrew Szczerba was the game's leading receiver, catching five passes for 65 yards in the first half.

In the quarterback competition, both Daryll Clark and Pat Devlin rotated between the first, second and third teams. Overall, Clark finished 9 of 16 for 106 yards and two scores, including a 33-yard touchdown pass to Derrick Williams. Devlin was 12 of 18 for 122 yards and a 22-yard touchdown pass to backup receiver Graham Zug.

On defense, sophomore Aaron Maybin tied for a game-high six tackles, including 3.5 sacks for the White team. Sophomore Ollie Ogbu led the Blue with six tackles and two sacks. Redshirt freshman linebacker Nate Stupar also had six tackles. Sophomore linebacker Chris Colasanti had four stops and forced and recovered a fumble.

=== Suspensions ===
Five players were suspended prior to spring drills for their involvement in an October 7 fight at the HUB-Robeson Center during the previous season, including defensive tackle Chris Baker, linebacker NaVorro Bowman, defensive back Knowledge Timmons, defensive tackle Phil Taylor, and receiver Chris Bell. Tight end Andrew Quarless became the sixth player suspended after a DUI incident in March. Bell was later kicked off the team after brandishing a knife at a teammate.

Following spring practice, Baker, Bowman, Quarless, Timmons and Taylor were allowed to rejoin and work out with the team. Baker was sentenced to two years probation.

ESPN's Outside the Lines aired a story on the legal troubles of the Penn State football team on July 27, 2008. The story detailed the increased number of PSU football players that have been arrested during the past few years. Among the statistics presented in the story was that 46 different players since 2002 have been charged with a combined 163 counts that have resulted in 27 players pleading guilty to 45 crimes. Three days after the story aired, Paterno dismissed Baker and Taylor, apparently after another off-campus incident.

=== Pre-season awards ===
- Jeremy Boone
  First-team Athlon Sports pre-season All-Big Ten
  First-team College Football News pre-season All-Big Ten
- Deon Butler
  Third-team Athlon Sports pre-season All-Big Ten
- Maurice Evans
  First-team Athlon Sports pre-season All-American
  Sports Illustrated pre-season All-American
  First-team College Football News pre-season All-American
  First-team College Football News pre-season All-Big Ten
- Josh Gaines
  Third-team Athlon Sports pre-season All-Big Ten
- Kevin Kelly
  Second-team Athlon Sports pre-season All-Big Ten
  Second-team College Football News pre-season All-Big Ten
- Rich Ohrnberger
  First-team Athlon Sports pre-season All-Big Ten
  Second-team College Football News pre-season All-Big Ten
- Lydell Sargeant
  Second-team Athlon Sports pre-season All-Big Ten
- Anthony Scirrotto
  Second-team Athlon Sports pre-season All-Big Ten
  Second-team College Football News pre-season All-Big Ten
- A. Q. Shipley
  First-team Athlon Sports pre-season All-Big Ten
  First-team College Football News pre-season All-Big Ten
- A. J. Wallace
  First-team Athlon Sports pre-season All-Big Ten (kick returner)
  Third-team Athlon Sports pre-season All-Big Ten (cornerback)
  First-team College Football News pre-season All-Big Ten
- Derrick Williams
  Third-team Athlon Sports pre-season All-Big Ten
  Second-team College Football News pre-season All-Big Ten
- Stefen Wisniewski
  First-team College Football News pre-season All-Big Ten

== Schedule ==
Date	Time	Opponent	Rank	Site	TV	Result	Attendance	Source
August 30	12:00 p.m.	Coastal Carolina*	No. 22	Beaver Stadium; University Park, PA	BTN	W 66–10	106,577	
September 6	3:30 p.m.	Oregon State*	No. 19	Beaver Stadium; University Park, PA	ABC/ESPN2	W 45–14	108,159	
September 13	3:30 p.m.	at Syracuse*	No. 17	Carrier Dome; Syracuse, NY (rivalry)	ABC	W 55–13	45,795	
September 20	12:00 p.m.	Temple*	No. 16	Beaver Stadium; University Park, PA	BTN	W 45–3	105,106	
September 27	8:00 p.m.	No. 22 Illinois	No. 12	Beaver Stadium; University Park, PA	ABC	W 38–24	109,626	
October 4	12:00 p.m	at Purdue	No. 6	Ross–Ade Stadium; West Lafayette, IN	ESPN	W 20–6	57,215	
October 11	8:00 p.m.	at Wisconsin	No. 6	Camp Randall Stadium; Madison, WI	ESPN	W 48–7	81,524	
October 18	4:30 p.m.	Michigan^{†}	No. 3	Beaver Stadium; University Park, PA (rivalry)	ESPN	W 46–17	110,017	
October 25	8:00 p.m.	at No. 10 Ohio State	No. 3	Ohio Stadium; Columbus, OH (rivalry, College GameDay)	ABC	W 13–6	105,711	
November 8	3:30 p.m.	at Iowa	No. 3	Kinnick Stadium; Iowa City, IA	ABC	L 23–24	70,585	
November 15	12:00 p.m.	Indiana	No. 7	Beaver Stadium; University Park, PA	BTN	W 34–7	108,447	
November 22	3:30 p.m.	No. 17 Michigan State	No. 7	Beaver Stadium; University Park, PA (rivalry)	ABC	W 49–18	109,845	
January 1, 2009	5:10 p.m.	vs. No. 5 USC*	No. 6	Rose Bowl; Pasadena, CA (Rose Bowl, College GameDay)	ABC	L 24–38	93,293	
*Non-conference game; ^{†}Homecoming; Rankings from AP Poll released prior to the game; All times are in Eastern time

== Roster ==
2008 Penn State Nittany Lions football team roster
Players
Coaches
Offense

Pos.	#	Name	Class
WR	2	Derrick Williams (C)	Sr
WR	3	Deon Butler	Sr
QB	4	John Kelly	Fr
WR	5	Graham Zug	So
WR	6	Derek Moye	Fr
QB	7	Pat Devlin	So
WR	8	James McDonald	Jr
WR	9	Kevin Cousins	Jr
TE	10	Andrew Quarless	Jr
QB	11	Matthew McGloin	Fr
WR	12	Chaz Powell	Fr
WR	14	A.J. Price	Fr
QB	15	Paul Cianciolo	Sr
QB	16	Shane McGregor	Fr
QB	17	Daryll Clark	Jr
WR	18	Andrew Goodman	Fr
WR	20	Devin Fentress	Sr
RB	21	Stephfon Green	Fr
RB	22	Evan Royster	So
WR	24	Jordan Norwood	Sr
RB	25	Brandon Beachum	Fr
WR	26	J.D. Mason	Fr
WR	29	Ryan Scherer	Fr
RB	32	Brent Carter	So
FB	33	Dan Lawlor	Sr
RB	34	Daryl Binder	Fr
RB	37	Joe Suhey	Fr
WR	38	Stephen Joseph	Fr
RB	39	Derek Day	Fr
FB	44	Larry Federoff	Jr
WR	49	Larry Ryland	Fr
G	50	Mike Lucian	Sr
OL	54	Matt Stankiewitch	Fr
C	57	A.Q. Shipley (C)	Sr
OL	60	Terry James	Fr
G	61	Stefen Wisniewski	So
G	64	Rich Ohrnberger	Sr
G	65	J.B. Walton	Fr
C	66	Ethan Hull	Fr
G	67	Quinn Barham	Fr
C	68	Doug Klopacz	So
OL	70	Andrew Radakovich	Fr
OL	70	Anthony Tortorelli	Fr
OT	72	Nerraw McCormack	Sr
OT	73	Dennis Landolt	Jr
G	74	Johnnie Troutman	Fr
OT	75	DeOn'tae Pannell	Fr
OL	76	Gerald Cadogan	Sr
OT	77	Lou Eliades	So
OL	78	Mike Farrell	Fr
OT	79	Ako Poti	Sr
TE	80	Andrew Szczerba	Fr
TE	82	Mickey Shuler	Jr
WR	83	Brett Brackett	So
WR	84	Patrick Mauti	Jr
WR	86	Mark Wedderburn	Fr
TE	87	Greg Miskinis	Sr
WR	88	Jon Ditto	Fr
TE	97	Gino Raneri	Fr

Defense

Pos.	#	Name	Class
CB	1	A.J. Wallace	Jr
CB	4	Knowledge Timmons	Jr
LB	5	Jerome Hayes	Fr
S	7	Anthony Scirrotto (C)	Sr
CB	8	D'Anton Lynn	Fr
S	9	Mark Rubin	Sr
CB	10	Lydell Sargeant	Sr
CB	11	Tony Davis	Sr
DB	12	Evan Lewis	Fr
LB	13	Andrew Dailey	Fr
LB	15	Bani Gbadyu	So
CB	16	Shelton McCullough	So
LB	18	Navorro Bowman	So
S	19	David Keisling	Fr
S	20	Ryan Gmerek	So
LB	22	Shaine Thompson	Fr
S	26	Nick Sukay	Fr
DB	27	Jacob Fagnano	Fr
S	28	Drew Astorina	Fr
S	29	Cedric Jeffries	So
LB	30	Josh Matzkin	So
CB	30	John O'Donnell	Fr
LB	31	Michael Zordich	Fr
LB	33	Michael Yancich	Fr
LB	34	Nathan Stupar	Fr
CB	35	Jesse Alfreno	So
LB	35	Ken Pollock	Fr
S	36	Kyle Johnson	Fr
S	38	Tyler Ahrenhold	Fr
DE	39	Tom Golarz	Jr
DB	40	Sean Luchnick	Fr
LB	42	Michael Mauti	Fr
LB	43	Josh Hull	Jr
DE	44	Kevion Latham	Fr
LB	45	Sean Lee	Jr
LB	46	Tyrell Sales	Sr
DE	47	Josh Gaines (C)	Sr
DE	48	Maurice Evans	Jr
DE	51	Jonathan Stewart	Fr
LB	52	Brian Irvin	Fr
LB	53	Chris Colasanti	So
LB	54	James Van Fleet	Fr
DT	55	Tom McEowen	So
DE	56	Eric Latimore	Fr
DL	58	Pete Massaro	Fr
DE	59	Aaron Maybin	So
DT	71	Devon Still	Fr
DE	81	Jack Crawford	Fr
DT	85	Ollie Ogbu	So
DT	91	Jared Odrick	Jr
DT	92	Chima Okoli	Fr
DT	93	James Terry	Fr
DL	94	Mikel Berry	Fr
DT	95	Abe Koroma	So
DL	97	J.R. Refice	Fr
DE	98	Matt Kenney	Fr
DT	99	Brandon Ware	Fr

Special teams

Pos.	#	Name	Class
K	23	Kevin Kelly	Sr
K	28	David Soldner	Fr
K	36	Collin Wagner	So
LS	40	Andrew Pitz	Jr
P	41	Jeremy Boone	Jr
P	49	Ryan Breen	Fr
LS	56	Michael Fuhrman	Fr

Head coach

- Joe Paterno

Coordinators/assistant coaches

Legend

- (C) Team captain
- (S) Suspended
- (I) Ineligible
- Injured
- Redshirt

Roster
Last update: November 12, 2008

== Coaching staff ==
- Joe Paterno – Head Coach
- Dick Anderson – Offensive Line (Guards and Centers)
- Tom Bradley – Defensive Coordinator and Cornerbacks
- Kermit Buggs – Safeties
- Galen Hall – Offensive Coordinator and Running Backs
- Larry Johnson, Sr. – Defensive Line
- Bill Kenney – Offensive Tackles and Tight Ends
- Mike McQueary – Wide Receivers and Recruiting Coordinator
- Jay Paterno – Quarterbacks
- Ron Vanderlinden – Linebackers
- John Thomas – Strength and Conditioning

== Game summaries ==
=== August 30: Coastal Carolina ===
	1	2	3	4	Total
Coastal Carolina	0	7	0	3	10
Penn State	14	24	21	7	66

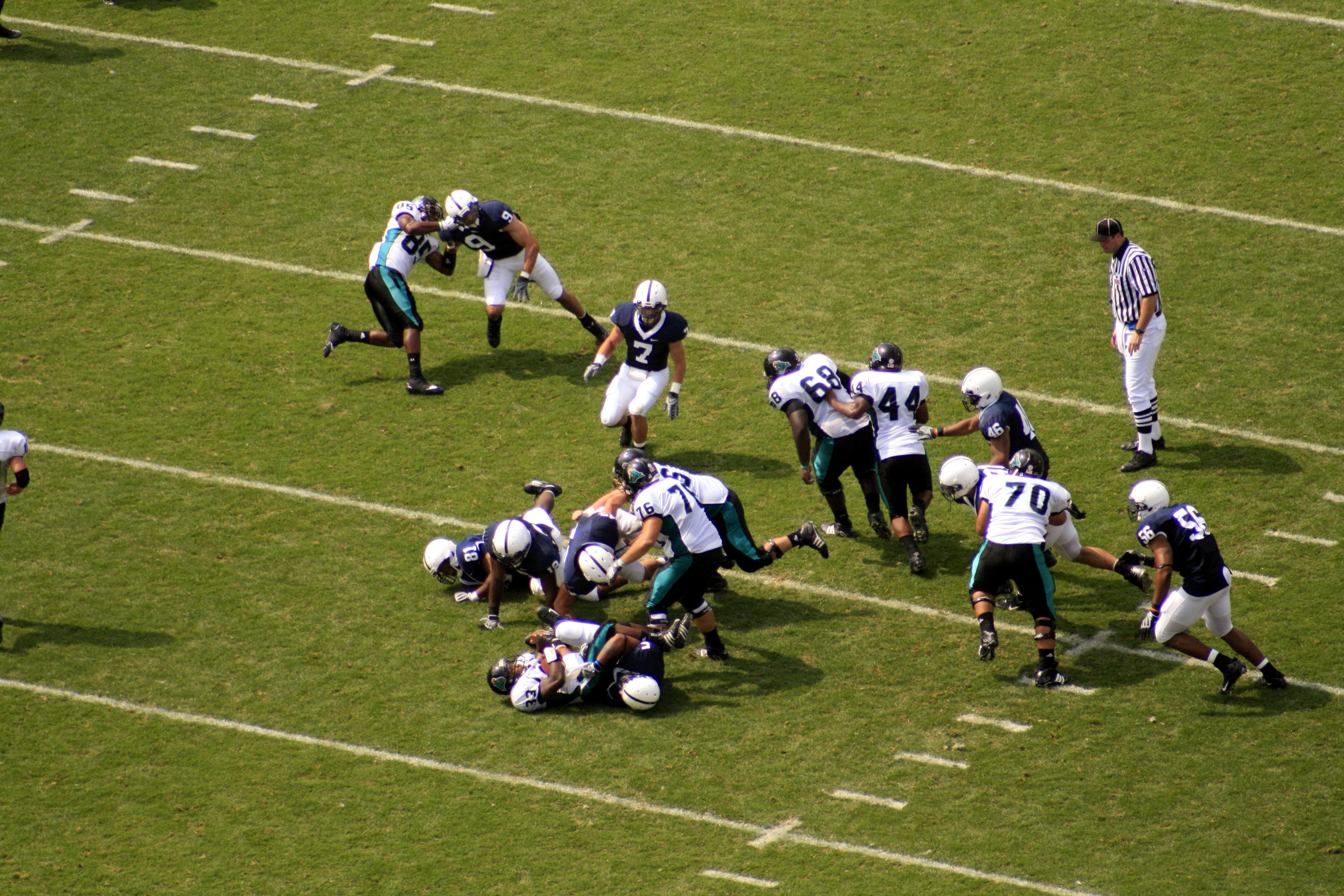
The Penn State defense tackles Coastal Carolina running back Arthur Sitton.

Sophomore tailback Evan Royster ran for three touchdowns and 64 yards on eight carries, and redshirt freshman Stephfon Green gained 89 yards on ten carries including two scores to help the Nittany Lions defeat the Chanticleers of Coastal Carolina 66–10. Penn State has won seven straight season openers. After Trent Usher provided the Chanticleers' lone touchdown on a 33-yard reception to cut Penn State's lead to 14–7 early in the second quarter, Derrick Williams scored on an 89-yard kickoff return en route to a 38–7 halftime lead.

Many reserves saw action in the second half, including Chaz Powell's 55-yard touchdown run, and freshman Brandon Beachum's 1-yard touchdown run in the fourth quarter for the Nittany Lions' final touchdown. After Darryl Clark and Pat Devlin split quarterback duties in the first three quarters, Penn State subbed in Paul Cianciolo for the 4th. Coastal Carolina kicked a field goal as time expired for the final score.

Defensively for Penn State, Tyrell Sales led the defense with seven tackles, while Aaron Maybin had two sacks. Bani Gbadyu snagged his first career interception. Twenty-eight Nittany Lions recorded at least one tackle.

The win tied Joe Paterno with Florida State's Bobby Bowden atop the career wins list among major college coaches with his 373rd win.

=== September 6: Oregon State ===
	1	2	3	4	Total
Oregon State	0	7	0	7	14
Penn State	14	21	10	0	45

In the week leading up to the game, a campus police search turned up a small amount of marijuana in an on-campus apartment home to defensive end Maurice Evans, defensive tackle Abe Koroma, tight end Andrew Quarless and cornerback A. J. Wallace. Coach Paterno later announced that Evans, Koroma and Quarless would not play against Oregon State. Wallace was allowed to return to practice, according to Paterno, "Wallace was not part of that." In an unrelated incident, cornerback Willie Harriott was dismissed from the team.

Despite the off-field distractions, the Nittany Lions rolled to a 35–7 halftime lead en route to a 45–14 win in their first ever meeting with the Beavers. Sophomore tailback Evan Royster ran for a career-high 141 yards on seventeen carries and three touchdowns. Daryll Clark's 276 total yards of offense (215 yards passing, 61 yards rushing) helped Penn State total 454 yards of offense.

Linebackers Tyrell Sales and NaVorro Bowman both recorded ten tackles each, both career-highs. Linebacker Josh Hull and safety Mark Rubin both made their first career interceptions. Junior defensive end Jerome Hayes, making his first career start in place of the suspended Evans, was lost for the remainder of the season with a torn ACL in his left knee. Hayes missed the latter half of the 2007 season with a torn ACL in his right knee.

For his performance, Royster was named Big Ten Co-Offensive Player of the Week.

=== September 13: Syracuse ===
	1	2	3	4	Total
Penn State	21	17	10	7	55
Syracuse	0	6	7	0	13

The Nittany Lions defeated their old rivals 55–13 in their first meeting since the series was last played in 1990. Each of Penn State's three quarterbacks threw touchdown passes. Daryll Clark finished 10 of 21 for 163 yards and two touchdowns, Pat Devlin was 8 of 13 for 130 yards and two touchdowns, and Paul Cianciolo was 2 of 4 for 51 yards and a score. Receivers Jordan Norwood and Deon Butler both had over 100 yards receiving and two touchdowns apiece. Kevin Kelly kicked a 52-yard field goal just before halftime, the second-longest of his career, and backup kicker Collin Wagner kicked a 43-yard field goal late in the third quarter, his first career field goal.

The Nittany Lion defense held the Orange offense without a first down until early in the second quarter.

=== September 20: Temple ===
	1	2	3	4	Total
Temple	0	0	3	0	3
Penn State	0	31	7	7	45

After a scoreless first quarter, the Nittany Lions scored three touchdowns in the first six minutes of the second quarter en route to a 31–0 halftime lead. The Penn State defense held the Owls to only 138 yards of total offense, including only 16 yards on the ground. In contrast, the Nittany Lions totaled 546 of offense, highlighted by Stephfon Green's 132 rushing yards including a 69-yard touchdown.

Sophomore linebacker NaVorro Bowman, in his first start, recorded eleven tackles, including five tackles for loss and three sacks, a forced fumble and an interception. Bowman was named Big Ten Co-Defensive Player of the Week.

The win, combined with Florida State's loss to Wake Forest, gave Paterno sole possession of the career record for most wins by a Division I FBS coach.

=== September 27: Illinois ===
	1	2	3	4	Total
Illinois	14	0	3	7	24
Penn State	14	7	3	14	38

The Nittany Lions defeated the Fighting Illini 38–24 in a nationally televised, prime time, "White Out" game, earning their first win over a ranked opponent this season and their first victory over a ranked opponent in a conference opener since joining the Big Ten. Illinois jumped out to a 14–7 lead, becoming the first team to take a lead on the Nittany Lions and the first to score points against them in the first quarter this season. However, the Nittany Lions responded with two touchdowns en route to a 21–14 halftime lead. The Illini wouldn't score again until kicking a field goal on the final play of the third quarter after recovering a Stephfon Green fumble, but Derrick Williams returned the ensuing kickoff for a touchdown. Penn State was 4 of 4 in the red zone and was penalized only once for 10 yards.

The Illini's 24 points were the most allowed by Penn State this season as were their 189 total rushing yards.

Derrick Williams is the first player under Paterno to score a rushing, receiving, and a kick return touchdown in the same game. His career-high 241 all-purpose yards (33 rushing, 75 receiving and 133 on kick returns) are the most by a Nittany Lion since Larry Johnson gained 289 yards versus Michigan State in 2002. Williams was selected the Big Ten Special Teams Player of the Week.

=== October 4: Purdue ===
	1	2	3	4	Total
Penn State	0	10	7	3	20
Purdue	0	0	0	6	6

Penn State defeated the Boilermakers 20–6 in their last matchup against Purdue coach Joe Tiller, who is retiring after this season. The Nittany Lions outgained Purdue 422 to 241 in total offense.

Daryll Clark completed 18 of 26 passes for 226 yards and a ran for a touchdown—a quarterback sneak on 4th-and-goal in the second quarter for the first points of the game. Running back Evan Royster ran for 141 yards and a touchdown and also caught four passes for 53 yards.

Purdue quarterback Curtis Painter finished 13 of 22 for 112 yards but was replaced by backup Joey Elliott after throwing an interception to Nittany Lions safety Drew Astorino. Purdue kicker Chris Summers missed all three of his kick attempts—two field goal attempts and an extra point attempt. Running back Kory Sheets' fourth-quarter touchdown on Purdue's last possession of the game was Purdue's first offensive touchdown against Penn State since 2005.

=== October 11: Wisconsin ===
	1	2	3	4	Total
Penn State	3	21	17	7	48
Wisconsin	0	7	0	0	7

Daryll Clark ran for two touchdowns and threw for one to Deon Butler in Penn State's 48–7 win over the Badgers in Camp Randall Stadium, handing them their worst home loss since 1989. Derrick Williams returned a punt for a touchdown, Evan Royster and backup quarterback Pat Devlin scored touchdowns on short runs, and Kevin Kelly kicked two field goals for the Nittany Lions. Penn State was penalized only once for 10 yards.

Clark was 16 of 25 passing for a career-high 244 yards and a touchdown, and also ran for a pair of scores for the first time in his career. He was named Big Ten's Offensive Player of the Week.

Defensive end Aaron Maybin, making only his fifth career start, was named Big Ten's Co-Defensive Player of the Week. Maybin recorded six tackles, a career-high 3.5 tackles-for-loss, a sack, two forced fumbles and a pass break-up. Maybin also stripped Badgers quarterback Allen Evridge late in the first half deep in Badgers territory, which was recovered by linebacker Josh Hull. Lydell Sargeant intercepted two passes, his first interceptions of the season.

=== October 18: Michigan ===
	1	2	3	4	Total
Michigan	10	7	0	0	17
Penn State	7	7	12	20	46

In front of the fourth-largest crowd in Beaver Stadium history, the Nittany Lions ended a nine-game losing streak to the Wolverines, dating back to 1997. Michigan tallied 204 yards of offense and scored on their first three possessions to take a 17–7 lead early in the second quarter. Daryll Clark's touchdown pass to Jordan Norwood late in the first half cut Michigan's lead to 17–14. Despite trailing at halftime for the first time this season, the Nittany Lion offense would outscore the Wolverines 32–0 in the second half and the defense made key halftime adjustments to limit the Wolverines to only 87 yards the remainder of the game.

Clark finished 18 of 31 for 171 yards and a touchdown and also ran for 45 yards and two one-yard touchdowns, but lost a fumble on Penn State's second drive which led to a Wolverine field goal. Evan Royster ran for a career-high 174 yards on eighteen carries for a 9.7 yard per carry average, including a 44-yard touchdown for Penn State's first points. Deon Butler had a season-high eight receptions for 105 yards, his fourth-career 100-yard game. Stephfon Green took a screen pass from Pat Devlin and outran the Wolverines defense 80 yards for the Nittany Lions' final score.

Linebacker NaVorro Bowman led the defense with eleven tackles. Defensive tackle Jared Odrick made a career-high six stops, with 2.5 tackles for loss, but his biggest play occurred with 4:39 remaining in the third quarter when he sacked Michigan quarterback Nick Sheridan, who was playing in place of the injured Steven Threet, in the end zone for a safety and Penn State's first lead of the game, 19–17. Aaron Maybin finished with four tackles, including a sack of Threet that forced a fumble, which was recovered by Abe Koroma and led to a Penn State touchdown.

Kicker Kevin Kelly made three field goals and five extra points to become the Big Ten's all-time leader in career kick scoring (376 career points) and was named the Big Ten's Special Teams Player of the Week. Odrick's sack for a safety was named the Pontiac Game Changing Performance of the Week.

=== October 25: Ohio State ===
	1	2	3	4	Total
Penn State	0	3	0	10	13
Ohio State	0	3	3	0	6

For the fourth straight year, ESPN's College GameDay crew broadcast from the site of the Penn State–Ohio State match-up.

In front of an Ohio Stadium-record crowd of 105,711, the Nittany Lions got their first win at Ohio State since 1978 by defeating the Buckeyes 13–6 in a game where both offenses were held below their season averages. The turning point of the game occurred early in the fourth quarter with Ohio State holding a three-point lead and facing a 3rd-and-1. Safety Mark Rubin tackled Buckeyes quarterback Terrelle Pryor and forced a fumble recovered by linebacker NaVorro Bowman. Backup quarterback Pat Devlin, in for an injured Daryll Clark, scored on a quarterback sneak for the only touchdown of the game. After Kevin Kelly's second field goal, the Buckeyes last drive was ended with an interception by cornerback Lydell Sargeant at the goal line, Pryor's second turnover of the game. The Buckeyes were limited to their lowest point total in Ohio Stadium since 1982, and the Nittany Lions were charged with zero penalties.

Clark completed 12 of 20 passes for 121 yards before leaving. Devlin only attempted one pass, which drew a pass interference flag. Evan Royster had 77 yards on 19 carries. The Nittany Lions defense held the Buckeyes running game in check, holding Pryor to six yards on nine attempts, and Chris "Beanie" Wells to 55 yards on 22 carries. Rubin led the defense with a career-high eleven tackles and the forced fumble, and Bowman had ten tackles and the fumble recovery.

Rubin's forced fumble was voted the week's Pontiac Game Changing Performance with an overwhelming 53 percent of the total votes, and Rubin was named the Walter Camp Football Foundation Defensive Player of the Week and the Big Ten's Defensive Player of the Week. The team was named the Tostitos Fiesta Bowl National Team of the Week by the Football Writers Association of America.

Kelly's two field goals moved him into a first place tie for made field goals (72) in Big Ten history.

The win earned the seventh-largest regular season primetime audience ever on ABC. It was the second-highest of the 2008 college football season, drawing a larger audience than Game 3 of the 2008 World Series played on the same evening. Despite being an away game, thousands of Penn State students and fans rioted in the streets of State College following the game.

=== November 8: Iowa ===
	1	2	3	4	Total
Penn State	3	10	10	0	23
Iowa	7	0	7	10	24

Penn State was handed their only loss of the regular season when Iowa kicked a 31-yard field goal with :01 remaining to win the game, 24–23. Iowa began their game-winning drive at their own 15-yard line following a Tyler Sash interception of a Daryll Clark pass. It was only Clark's third interception of the year.

Derrick Williams was a multidimensional threat: taking several direct snaps from a variant of the Wildcat formation, rushing for 53 yards and a touchdown on twelve carries, and completing his first career pass (23 yards to tight end Mickey Shuler). Running back Evan Royster picked up 90 yards and a touchdown on a career-high twenty-six carries, becoming the 12th Nittany Lion to rush for 1,000 yards in a season. Receiver Deon Butler had three catches, moving him into a tie with Bobby Engram for the career receptions leader at Penn State (167). Kevin Kelly set the Big Ten record for career field goals with his 24-yarder in the first quarter, topping Mike Nugent's previous record of 72. Kelly has kicked field goals in a school-record 30 consecutive games.

Penn State's defense limited the Iowa offense to 272 yards and forced two turnovers but allowed the Hawkeyes to drive 41 yards and into field goal range on the game's final drive, aided by a controversial pass interference penalty against Penn State on what appeared to be a legitimate stop on 3rd and 15.... The penalty led to Iowa's last-second field goal win.

=== November 15: Indiana ===
	1	2	3	4	Total
Indiana	0	7	0	0	7
Penn State	0	10	17	7	34

Penn State overcame a sluggish first half to preserve their perfect record over the Hoosiers with a 34–7 victory. The Nittany Lions overcame three Daryll Clark turnovers, who threw for 240 yards and two touchdowns. Receiver Deon Butler had five receptions for 56 yards and a touchdown, becoming Penn State's career receptions leader with 172, passing Bobby Engram (167). Derrick Williams accumulated 164 all-purpose yards, the second-highest total of his career. Williams ran for a career-high 61 yards on four carries, including a career-long 36-yard touchdown run in the fourth quarter. His 39-yard touchdown catch was his longest career reception.

The defense held Indiana to 180 yards of total offense and only six first downs, the fewest Penn State has ever allowed in a Big Ten game. Linebacker Josh Hull led all tacklers with seven, including his first career sack. The only points allowed came on a Marcus Thigpen 57-yard rushing touchdown in the second quarter to tie the game 7–7. Kevin Kelly later kicked a field goal to give the Lions a 10–7 lead at halftime. In the second half, the Nittany Lions defense would only give up 36 yards and one first down.

=== November 22: Michigan State ===
	1	2	3	4	Total
Michigan State	0	7	0	11	18
Penn State	7	21	14	7	49

On Senior Day, the Nittany Lions clinched a Rose Bowl BCS bid and a share of the Big Ten championship with a 49–18 victory over the Spartans. In snowy weather conditions, Daryll Clark threw for career-highs of 341 yards and four touchdowns. The offensive line, led by seniors A. Q. Shipley, Gerald Cadogan, Mike Lucian and Rich Ohrnberger, and senior fullback Dan Lawlor paved the way for Penn State's 557 yards of total offense. Senior receiver Jordan Norwood had five receptions for a career-high 127 yards. Fellow senior Deon Butler tallied 133 yards on three receptions, all resulting in touchdowns.

Entering the game, Spartans running back Javon Ringer was third in the NCAA in rushing averaging 140.7 yards per game, but the Penn State defense held Ringer to a season-low 42 yards. Senior Mark Rubin led all Penn State tacklers with eight. Senior defensive backs Lydell Sargeant and Anthony Scirrotto each had one interception, with Scirrotto's leading to a Derrick Williams 32-yard touchdown on the next offensive play.

The win was the 800th in Penn State history. The Nittany Lions are the sixth school to reach 800 wins, joining Michigan (872), Notre Dame (830), Texas (830), Nebraska (815) and Ohio State (808).

Clark was named the Big Ten Co-Offensive Player of the Week.

=== January 1, 2009: USC (Rose Bowl) ===
	1	2	3	4	Total
Penn State	7	0	0	17	24
USC	7	24	0	7	38

For the first time since 2004, the Big Ten and Pac-10 champs met in the Rose Bowl. During the years in between, one or the other was in the BCS national championship. However, the last time USC and Penn State met in a bowl game, Penn State was still an independent.

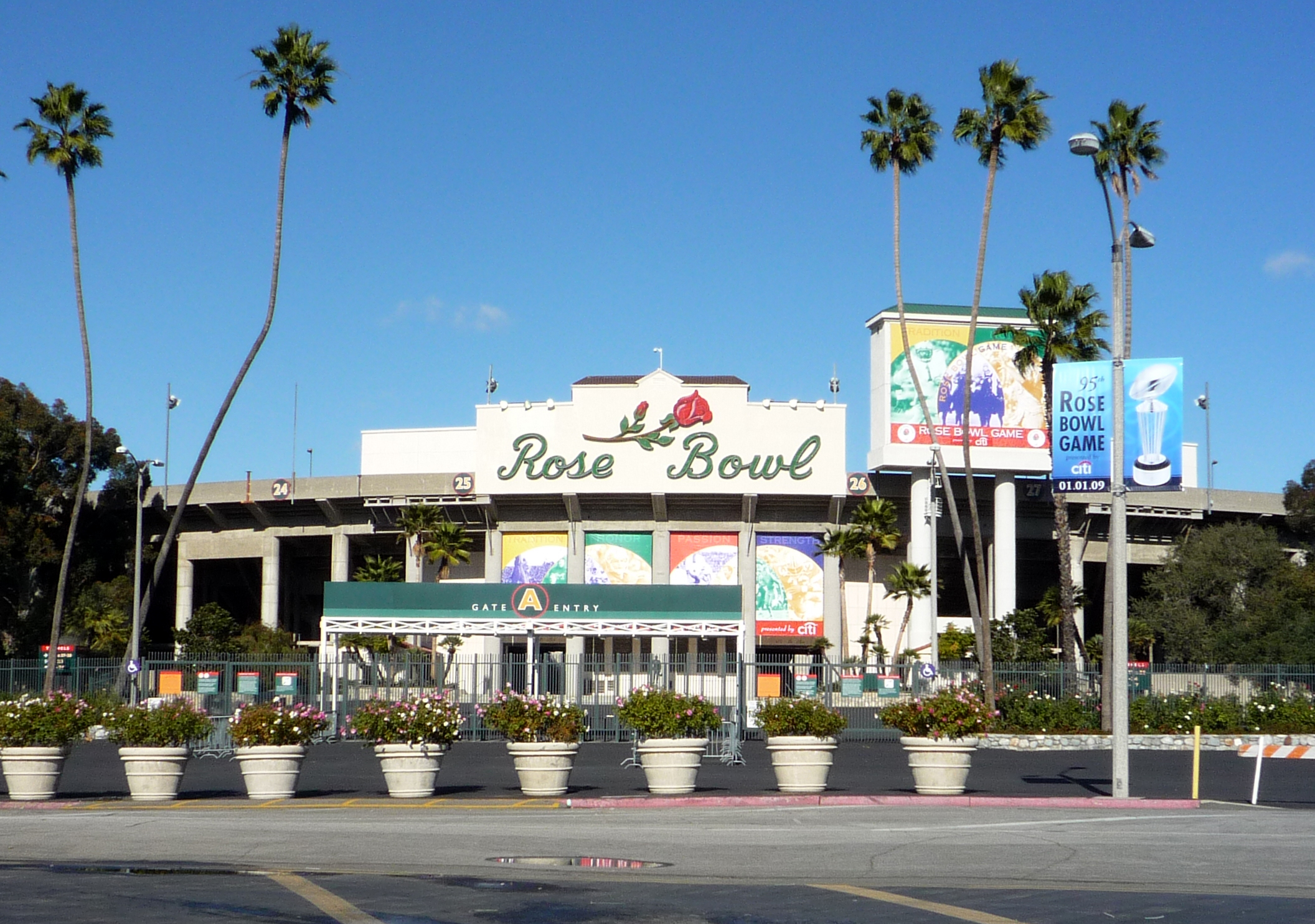
The Rose Bowl stadium, prepared the 95th edition of the nation's oldest bowl game.

After a close first quarter, USC scored 24 unanswered second quarter points en route to a 31–7 halftime lead. A possible fumble in Penn State's favor was negated by an offsides penalty and Stephon Green's fumble just before halftime led to the final USC touchdown. The second half was more in Penn State's favor. USC continued their pass-heavy gameplan, but Penn State adjusted and was able to outscore USC 17–7 in the second half. Penn State cut the lead to 38–24 with 4 and 1/2 minutes left, but their first attempt to cut further into the lead was immediately intercepted. However, USC's next punt went sailing over the punter and Penn State recovered, giving Penn State the ball at the USC 14, but it was also intercepted. With the loss, Penn State moved to 1–2 in Rose Bowls and 1–1 under Joe Paterno.

After taking over for an injured Evan Royster in the second quarter, backup tailback Stephfon Green finished with 57 yards on 10 carries and was the Nittany Lions' leading receiver with five catches for 67 yards. Green left the game in the fourth quarter after sustaining what appeared to be a sprained right ankle. However, tests conducted after the team returned home revealed that Green sustained broken bones in his right leg and ankle and would require surgery to help repair the bones. Green is expected out of action for up to three months.

== Rankings ==
Ranking movements Legend: ██ Increase in ranking ██ Decrease in ranking ( ) = First-place votes
	Week																
Poll	Pre	1	2	3	4	5	6	7	8	9	10	11	12	13	14	15	Final
AP	22	19	17	16	12	6	6	3	3	3	3 (6)	7	7	6	6	6	8
Coaches	22	19	17	15	12	6	6	3 (3)	3 (2)	3 (3)	2 (6)	8	8	6	6	6	8
Harris	Not released						6	3 (4)	3 (3)	3 (5)	2 (17)	7	7	6	6	6	Not released
BCS	Not released								3	3	3	8	8	8	6	6	Not released

== Awards ==
=== Watchlists ===
- Deon Butler
  Fred Biletnikoff Award watchlist
- Gerald Cadogan
  Outland Trophy watchlist
  Draddy Trophy semifinalist
- Daryll Clark
  Maxwell Award watchlist and semifinalist
  Davey O'Brien Award semifinalist
- Maurice Evans
  Lombardi Award watchlist
  Bronko Nagurski Trophy watchlist
  Chuck Bednarik Award watchlist
  Ted Hendricks Award watchlist
- Kevin Kelly
  Lou Groza Award watchlist and semifinalist
- Aaron Maybin
  Chuck Bednarik Award semifinalist and finalist
  Walter Camp Player of the Year watchlist
  Ted Hendricks Award mid-season watchlist and finalist
- Joe Paterno
  George Munger Award semifinalist
  Liberty Mutual Coach of the Year Award finalist
  Eddie Robinson Coach of the Year finalist
- Evan Royster
  Maxwell Award watchlist
  Doak Walker Award semifinalist
- A. Q. Shipley
  Lombardi Award watchlist
  Outland Trophy watchlist
  Rimington Trophy watchlist and finalist
- Derrick Williams
  Maxwell Award watchlist
  Fred Biletnikoff Award watchlist

=== Players ===
- Jeremy Boone
  ESPN The Magazine CoSIDA Academic All-District
- NaVorro Bowman
  First-team All-Big Ten
  ESPN All-Big Ten
  ESPN All-Bowl Team
  Big Ten Defensive Player of the Week (September 20)
  Phil Steele's mid-season All-American
- Deon Butler
  Second-team All-Big Ten (conference media selection)
- Gerald Cadogan
  First-team All-Big Ten
  Big Ten Sportsmanship Award
  ESPN All-Big Ten
  ESPN The Magazine CoSIDA Academic All-District
  First-team ESPN The Magazine CoSIDA Academic All-American
- Daryll Clark
  First-team All-Big Ten
  ESPN All-Big Ten
  Big Ten Offensive Player of the Week (October 11)
  Big Ten Offensive Player of the Week (November 22)
- Pat Devlin
  ESPN The Magazine CoSIDA Academic All-District
- Josh Hull
  ESPN The Magazine CoSIDA Academic All-District
  First-team ESPN The Magazine CoSIDA Academic All-American
- Kevin Kelly
  First-team All-Big Ten
  Big Ten Special Teams Player of the Week (Oct. 18)
- Aaron Maybin
  First-team Walter Camp All-American
  FWAA All-American
  First-team Associated Press All-American
  CBS Sports All-American
  Second-team Sports Illustrated All-American
  Second-team Sporting News All-American
  Third-team Rivals.com All-American
  First-team All-Big Ten
  ESPN All-Big Ten
  Big Ten Defensive Player of the Week (Oct. 11)
  Sports Illustrated mid-season All-American
  College Football News mid-season All-American
  CBS Sports mid-season All-American
  Phil Steele's mid-season All-American
  Pigskin Club of Washington, D.C. National Defensive Player of the Year
- Jared Odrick
  First-team All-Big Ten (conference coaches selection)
  ESPN/Pontiac Game Changing Performance (Oct. 18)
- Rich Ohrnberger
  Third-team Associated Press All-American
  First-team All-Big Ten
  ESPN All-Big Ten
- Andrew Pitz
  ESPN The Magazine CoSIDA Academic All-District
  First-team ESPN The Magazine CoSIDA Academic All-American
- Evan Royster
  Second-team All-Big Ten
  Big Ten Offensive Player of the Week (September 6)
- Mark Rubin
  Walter Camp Defensive Player of the Week (Oct. 25)
  ESPN The Magazine CoSIDA Academic All-District
  First-team ESPN The Magazine CoSIDA Academic All-American
  Big Ten Defensive Player of the Week (Oct. 25)
  ESPN/Pontiac Game Changing Performance (Oct. 25)
- Lydell Sargeant
  Second-team All-Big Ten (conference media selection)
- Anthony Scirrotto
  Third-team Rivals.com All-American
  First-team All-Big Ten (conference coaches selection)
- A. Q. Shipley
  2008 Rimington Trophy winner
  First-team Walter Camp All-American
  FWAA All-American
  ESPN All-American
  CBS Sports All-American
  Second-team Associated Press All-American
  Second-team Sports Illustrated All-American
  Third-team Rivals.com All-American
  First-team All-Big Ten
  Big Ten Offensive Lineman of the Year
  ESPN All-Big Ten
  Sports Illustrated mid-season All-American
  College Football News mid-season All-American
  CBS Sports mid-season All-American
  Phil Steele's mid-season All-American
- Derrick Williams
  Second-team Walter Camp All-American
  Third-team Associated Press All-American
  Second-team Sporting News All-American
  Second-team Rivals.com All-American
  First-team All-Big Ten (conference coaches selection)
  ESPN All-Big Ten
  Big Ten Special Teams Player of the Week (Sep. 27)
  Sports Illustrated mid-season All-American
  College Football News mid-season All-American
  CBS Sports mid-season All-American
  Sporting News Today mid-season All-American
  Phil Steele's mid-season All-American
- Stefen Wisniewski
  Second-team All-Big Ten (conference coaches selection)
  ESPN The Magazine CoSIDA Academic All-District
  Second-team ESPN The Magazine CoSIDA Academic All-American

=== Coaches ===
- Joe Paterno
  Dave McClain Big Ten Coach of the Year

=== Other awards ===
2008 Lambert Trophy winner
FWAA Tostitos Fiesta Bowl National Team of the Week (October 25)

== Postseason ==
Penn State finished the season ranked number 8 in both the final AP and Coaches college football polls, earning Penn State its 22nd Top 10 finish under Joe Paterno. It's the 34th final top 25 ranking under Paterno.

Penn State finished second in football attendance for the sixth time this decade and in the top four for the 18th consecutive year, averaging 108,254 for seven home games, including crowds of 110,017 on homecoming to watch Penn State host Michigan, the fourth-largest in Beaver Stadium history, and 109,845 to watch Penn State beat Michigan State and clinch the Big Ten title, the seventh-largest in Beaver Stadium history.

In December, backup quarterback Pat Devlin decided to transfer from Penn State and would not play in the Rose Bowl. Devlin appeared in ten games for the Nittany Lions, passing for 459 yards, four touchdowns and no interceptions. Devlin later committed to Delaware, a Division I FCS school, where he will have two years of eligibility left.

In January, redshirt sophomore defensive end Aaron Maybin announced that he was skipping his final two seasons of eligibility and declared for the 2009 NFL draft. Junior defensive end Maurice Evans, despite losing his starting position and playing time to Maybin due to a three-game suspension for marijuana possession, also declared for the draft.

After the Rose Bowl, defensive line coach Larry Johnson, Sr. interviewed with Illinois head coach Ron Zook to become the Illini's defensive coordinator. While many anticipated Johnson to take the job, in the end Johnson decided to stay at his current position at Penn State.

Eight players were invited to the NFL Scouting Combine, held February 18–24 in Indianapolis: Deon Butler, Gerald Cadogan, Maurice Evans, Aaron Maybin, Jordan Norwood, Lydell Sargeant, A. Q. Shipley and Derrick Williams.

=== NFL draft ===
Five Penn State players were selected in the 2009 NFL draft.

Round	Pick	Overall	Name	Position	Team
1st	11	11	Aaron Maybin	Defensive end	Buffalo Bills
3rd	18	82	Derrick Williams	Wide receiver	Detroit Lions
3rd	27	91	Deon Butler	Wide receiver	Seattle Seahawks
4th	23	123	Rich Ohrnberger	Guard	New England Patriots
7th	17	226	A. Q. Shipley	Center	Pittsburgh Steelers

Along with the five players selected in the 2009 NFL Draft, nine other players have signed with NFL teams.

Name	Position	Team
Gerald Cadogan	Tackle	Carolina Panthers
Tony Davis	Cornerback	Arizona Cardinals
Maurice Evans	Defensive end	New York Giants
Josh Gaines	Defensive end	Philadelphia Eagles
Jordan Norwood	Wide receiver	Cleveland Browns
Mark Rubin	Safety	St. Louis Rams
Tyrell Sales	Linebacker	Indianapolis Colts
Lydell Sargeant	Cornerback	Buffalo Bills
Anthony Scirrotto	Safety	Carolina Panthers

=== All-star games ===
Game	Date	Site	Players
84th East–West Shrine Game	January 17, 2009	Robertson Stadium, Houston, Texas	Deon Butler
60th Senior Bowl	January 24, 2009	Ladd–Peebles Stadium, Mobile, Alabama	Derrick Williams
3rd Texas vs. The Nation Game	January 31, 2009	Sun Bowl Stadium, El Paso, Texas	Gerald Cadogan, Jordan Norwood, Rich Ohrnberger, Lydell Sargeant, Anthony Scirrotto
* A.Q. Shipley was also invited to play in the East–West Shrine Game but declined in favor of attending the official Rimington Trophy ceremony
