= Josh Hull (American football) =

American football player (born 1987)

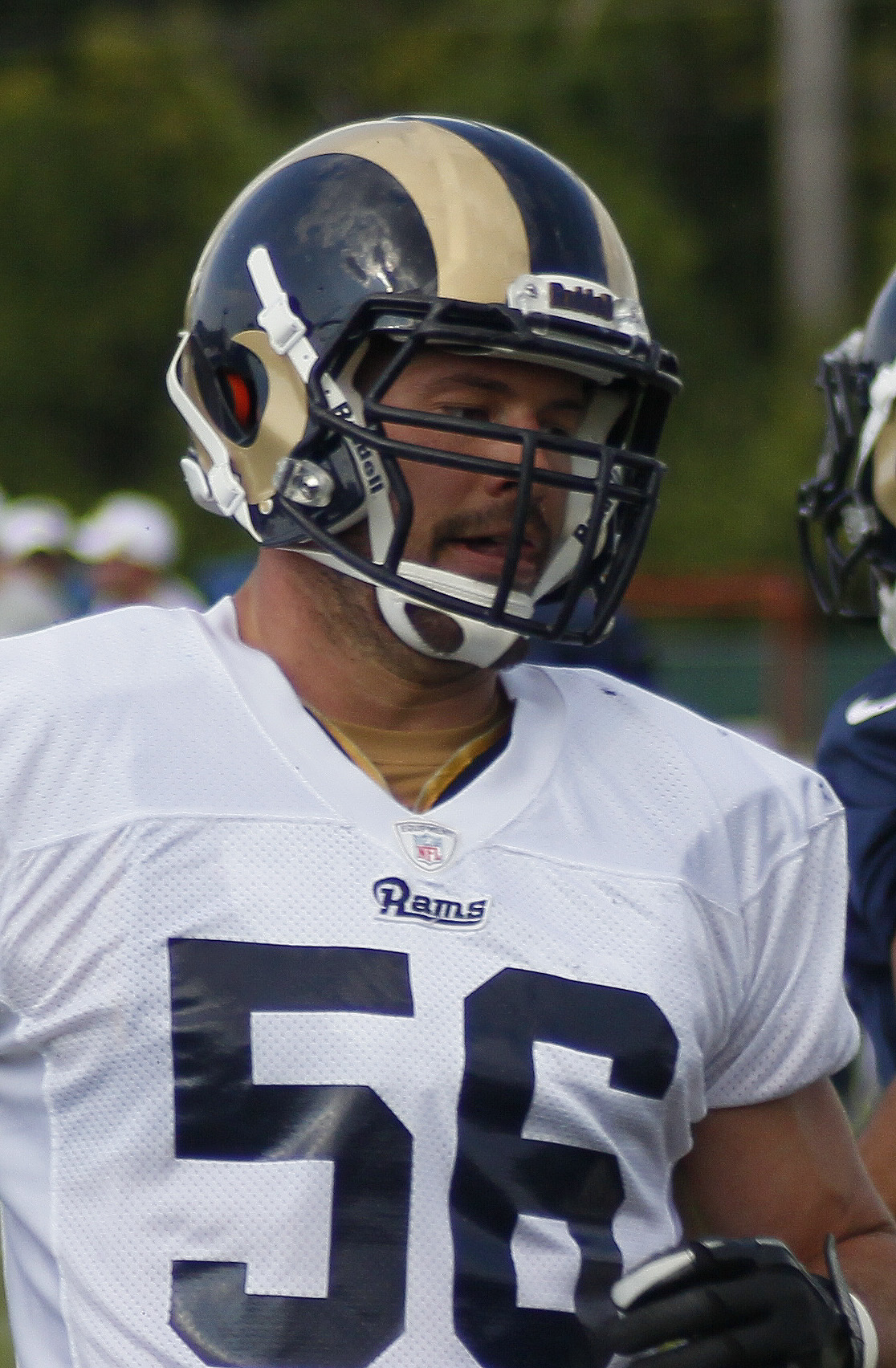
- Hull at the St. Louis Rams 2013 training camp

No. 56, 58
- Position: Linebacker

Personal information
- Born: May 21, 1987 (age 39); State College, Pennsylvania, U.S.
- Listed height: 6 ft 3 in (1.91 m)
- Listed weight: 245 lb (111 kg)

Career information
- High school: Spring Mills (PA) Penns Valley
- College: Penn State
- NFL draft: 2010: 7th round, 254th overall pick

Career history
- St. Louis Rams (2010–2012); Washington Redskins (2013); New England Patriots (2014)*; Jacksonville Jaguars (2014)*
- * Offseason or practice squad member only

Awards and highlights
- Second-team All-Big Ten (2009)

Career NFL statistics
- Total tackles: 25
- Forced fumbles: 2
- Stats at Pro Football Reference

Joshua Lynn Hull (born May 21, 1987) is an American former professional football player who was a linebacker in the National Football League (NFL). He played college football for the Penn State Nittany Lions and was selected by the St. Louis Rams in seventh round of the 2010 NFL draft.

== Early life ==
Hull grew up in Millheim, Pennsylvania, approximately 25 miles east of State College, Pennsylvania. He attended Penns Valley High School, where he played football under coach Martin Tobias. He was a three-year starter, serving as team captain and defensive captain as a senior. Hull was selected first-team all-conference on defense after his senior season and was a team captain in the 2006 Lezzer Lumber Classic. He was also a three-year letterman on the baseball team, earning first-team all-conference accolades as an outfielder.

== College career ==
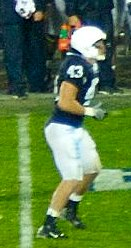
Hull with Penn State in 2009

A former walk-on, Hull became a starter in 2008 when pre-season All-American Sean Lee suffered a season-ending knee injury in spring practice. Hull was the starter for all 13 games that season, finishing as the second leading tackler behind NaVorro Bowman with 66 tackles, one quarterback sack, and one interception. He had a game-high nine tackles in the 2009 Rose Bowl.

Hull was also recognized for academics while at Penn State. He was a member of the Dean's List and was named an Academic All-Big Ten scholar-athlete, while majoring in environmental systems engineering. He was named a 2008 Academic All-American, and an inaugural recipient of a Big Ten Distinguished Scholar Award for the 2008-09 academic year.

== Professional career ==
=== Pre-draft ===
Hull played in the 4th Annual Texas vs. The Nation All-Star Challenge in El Paso, Texas, on February 6, 2010.

Pre-draft measurables
Height	Weight	Arm length	Hand span	40-yard dash	10-yard split	20-yard split	20-yard shuttle	Three-cone drill	Vertical jump	Broad jump	Bench press	Wonderlic
6 ft 3 in (1.91 m)	237 lb (108 kg)	32 3/4 in (0.83 m)	9 in (0.23 m)	4.93 s	1.64 s	2.75 s	4.07 s	6.73 s	32 1/2 in (0.83 m)	9 ft 9 in (2.97 m)	25 reps	x
Values from NFL Combine and Penn State pro day

Although not initially invited to the 2010 NFL Scouting Combine, he was added to the list of invitees on January 29, 2010. Hull and teammate Dennis Landolt trained for the combine at TEST in Martinsville, New Jersey, based partially on the recommendation of his agent, Joe Aloisi and former Nittany Lion Rich Ohrnberger.

=== St. Louis Rams ===
Hull was selected by the St. Louis Rams in the seventh round (#254 overall) of the 2010 NFL draft. He signed a four-year contract with the Rams on June 28, 2010. Hull was released by the Rams on August 30, 2013.

=== Washington Redskins ===
The Washington Redskins signed Hull on October 15, 2013. He was released on April 5, 2014.

=== New England Patriots ===
On April 24, 2014, Hull signed a one-year deal with the New England Patriots. Hull was waived by the team on July 28, 2014.

=== Jacksonville Jaguars ===
Hull signed with the Jacksonville Jaguars on August 2, 2014. The Jaguars released Hull on August 24, 2014.
