= A. J. Wallace (American football) =

American gridiron football player (born 1988)

No. 21
- Position: Cornerback

Personal information
- Born: May 23, 1988 (age 38)
- Listed height: 6 ft 1 in (1.85 m)
- Listed weight: 195 lb (88 kg)

Career information
- College: Penn State
- NFL draft: 2010: undrafted

Career history
- Miami Dolphins (2010)*; Georgia Force (2011)*; Calgary Stampeders (2011)*; Milwaukee Mustangs (2012); Colorado Ice (2013)
- * Offseason or practice squad member only

Career AFL statistics
- Total tackles: 2
- Stats at ArenaFan.com

Anton Dominic "A. J." Wallace, Jr. (born May 23, 1988) is an American former football cornerback and kick returner. He was signed by the Miami Dolphins as an undrafted free agent in 2010. He played college football at Penn State. Wallace was also a member of the Georgia Force, Calgary Stampeders, Milwaukee Mustangs, and Colorado Ice.

Wallace attended Maurice J. McDonough High School in Pomfret, Maryland where he played running back, cornerback, and kick returner. He earned The Washington Post first-team All-Met honors, and played in the U.S. Army All-American Bowl. At Penn State, he rushed for 153 yards and a touchdown, and caught one pass for five yards. He returned 47 kickoffs for 1,128 yards and one touchdown in his four-year career. In 2007, Wallace broke the Nittany Lions football record for kickoff yardage in a season with 581 yards, breaking the previous record set by Kenny Watson in 1999 with 522 yards.

== Early life ==
Wallace attended McDonough High School in Pomfret, Maryland. He lettered in football and played running back, cornerback and kick returner. As a running back, he rushed 537 times for 4,480 yards and 50 touchdowns in his high school career, averaging 8.3 yards per carry. As a cornerback, he made three interceptions, and was rated the 6th-best cornerback nationally by Scout.com. As a kick returner, he returned three kicks for touchdowns. He earned The Washington Post first-team All-Met honors. He earned U.S. Army All-American honors and played in the U.S. Army All-American Bowl. He was also chosen first-team small-school all-state.

== College career ==
=== 2006 season ===
In 2006, Wallace played in every game on offense, defense and special teams. He averaged 21.8 yards every time he touched the ball. He finished fourth on the team in all-purpose yardage with 546. He had 25 touches during the season, and was fourth in the Big Ten in average kick return yards with a 24.2 average on 16 returns. He ran for 153 yards on eight carries with a 19.1 average. Wallace made eight solo tackles (10 total) at cornerback. He also had five plays that exceeded 40 yards. In the season-opener against Akron, Wallace took a second-quarter reserve 42 yards in his first ever college football play. He returned two kickoffs for 41 and 54 yards each in his college debut. Against Notre Dame, Wallace had a 17-yard run on a reverse and caught his first career pass that went for five yards. He also returned two kickoffs for 26 yards. Against Youngstown State, Wallace took a reverse 76 yards for a touchdown. Against Northwestern, Wallace rushed for 12 yards on two carries. Against Michigan, Wallace returned the opening kickoff 46 yards and had a total of 82 yards on three returns. He also made two solo tackles. Against Illinois, Wallace returned four kickoffs for 89 yards, including one for 33 yards. Against Temple, Wallace returned a kickoff 31 yards. Against Michigan State in the regular season finale, Wallace recorded five solo tackles. In the 2007 Outback Bowl against Tennessee, Wallace rushed once for 11 yards and returned two kickoffs for 34 yards.

=== 2007 season ===
Throughout the 2007 season, Wallace and Lydell Sargeant competed for the starting left cornerback job, with Sargeant earning it in the beginning of the season. However, Wallace started the last four games of the season at left cornerback. He played in every game of the season, and accumulated 33 tackles (22 of them solo), one interception, three fumble recoveries, and four broken-up passes. Wallace broke the school record for kickoff returns in a season with 581, which broke the record set by Kenny Watson in 1999 with 522. Wallace ranked third in the Big Ten in kickoff return yardage with an average of 26.4 yards on his 22 returns. Against Notre Dame, Wallace ran a kickoff return 68 yards on the opening kickoff of the second half. He also made a solo tackle. Against Buffalo, he returned a kickoff 51 yards and made three tackles. Against Michigan, Wallace had two solo tackles and recovered a fumble. He also returned two kickoffs for 41 yards. Against Illinois, Wallace returned four kickoffs for 55 yards. Against Indiana, Wallace made a career-high five tackles and recovered a muffed punt return by the Hoosiers. He also returned one kickoff for 33 yards. Against Ohio State, Wallace started at cornerback for the first time in his career. He ran a kickoff 97 yards for a touchdown, the first Penn State player to do so since Larry Johnson had a 97-yard return against Illinois in 2001. He also made three tackles and broke up a pass. Against Purdue, Wallace returned three kickoffs for 42 yards. Against Temple, Wallace made five tackles, tying his career-high. Against Michigan State, he made four tackles and returned a kickoff 56 yards. He had a total of 98 yards on four kickoff returns. In the 2007 Alamo Bowl against Texas A&M, Wallace made five tackles, three of which were solo, intercepted a pass, and recovered a fumble. He also returned one kickoff for 15 yards.

=== 2008 season ===
Wallace was named third-team preseason All-American by Phil Steele's College Football as a kick returner. In the 2008 season, Wallace again had to compete with Sargeant for a starting cornerback job. Wallace played in every game for the Nittany Lions, and accumulated 20 tackles, 16 of which were solo, two broken-up passes, and returned six kickoffs for an average of 19.8 yards per return. Wallace was hampered by a slight hamstring injury early in the season. In the season-opener against Coastal Carolina, Wallace made two tackles and returned a kickoff 35 yards, his season best. Against Syracuse, Wallace returned two kickoffs for 37 yards and made two tackles. Against Illinois, Wallace made a career-high six tackles (five solo) and returned two kickoffs for 31 yards. He started in games against Purdue and Wisconsin. He made two tackles each against Ohio State and Iowa. In the 2009 Rose Bowl against USC, Wallace made three tackles.

=== 2009 season ===
After all four starting defensive backs for the Nittany Lions graduated, Wallace was given the opportunity to start in 2009, without having to compete with Sargeant for a starting job. Against Iowa, Wallace made four tackles and intercepted a pass. Against Illinois, Wallace returned two kickoffs for 21 yards and made one tackle. Against Eastern Illinois, Wallace made an interception and returned it for 11 yards. He also made a career-high seven tackles. Against Minnesota, Wallace returned a kickoff 19 yards and made four tackles. Against Northwestern, Wallace made six tackles. Wallace missed the game against Michigan State due to a head injury.

At Penn State, Wallace accumulated 95 tackles and three interceptions. He has rushed for 153 yards and a touchdown, and caught one pass for five yards. He has returned 47 kickoffs for 1,128 yards and one touchdown in his four-year career.

Wallace played in the Texas vs. The Nation Game on February 6, 2010.

== Professional career ==
=== Pre-draft ===
Wallace was projected by NFLDraftScout.com to go undrafted in the 2010 NFL draft. He is ranked 61st out of all cornerbacks nationally.

=== Miami Dolphins ===
Wallace was signed by the Miami Dolphins as an undrafted free agent following the 2010 NFL draft. He left the team on August 4. He was waived on August 9.

=== Georgia Force ===
Wallace signed with the Georgia Force of the Arena Football League on November 30, 2010.

=== Calgary Stampeders ===
Wallace signed with the Calgary Stampeders of the Canadian Football League on January 31, 2011.
