= A. J. Wallace =

A. J. Wallace may refer to:

- Ajahni Wallace (born 2003), Jamaican rugby league footballer
- A. J. Wallace (American football) (born 1988), American football college cornerback and kick returner
- Albert Joseph Wallace (1853–1939), American politician, Lieutenant Governor of California from 1910 to 1914
