= Dennis Landolt =

American football player (born 1986)

- Landolt signs autographs at Penn State's 2008 Blue & White game, April 19, 2008.

No. 76
- Position: Offensive tackle

Personal information
- Born: October 15, 1986 (age 40); Burlington, New Jersey, U.S.
- Listed height: 6 ft 4 in (1.93 m)
- Listed weight: 306 lb (139 kg)

Career information
- High school: Delran (NJ) Holy Cross
- College: Penn State
- NFL draft: 2010: undrafted

Career history
- New York Giants (2010)*; San Francisco 49ers (2010)*; New York Jets (2011)*; New Orleans Saints (2011)*; New York Jets (2011–2013)*
- * Offseason or practice squad member only

Awards and highlights
- Third-team All-American (2009); First-team All-Big Ten (2009)
- Stats at Pro Football Reference

Dennis Patrick Landolt (born October 15, 1986) is an American former professional football offensive tackle. He was signed by the New York Giants as an undrafted free agent in 2010. He played college football at the Pennsylvania State University.

Landolt was also a member of the New Orleans Saints, San Francisco 49ers, and New York Jets.

== Early life ==
Landolt graduated from Holy Cross High School in Delran Township, New Jersey in 2004.

He was the first freshman to start at Holy Cross in more than 10 years and made 45 consecutive starts in his career. He was named first-team all-state by the Newark Star-Ledger, having not allowed a sack in three seasons. He made 60 tackles and eight sacks on defense as a senior. Landolt was an All-East selection that year and Rivals.com rated him the nation's No. 19 offensive tackle in 2004. Landolt was also a standout wrestler, finishing third in the New Jersey state championships as a senior.

His brother Kevin also played at Holy Cross and went on to play in the NFL for the Jacksonville Jaguars.

== College career ==
Landolt redshirted his freshman season in 2005. In 2006, he would play in six games, backing up All-American Levi Brown. Landolt earned the starting right tackle job in 2007, starting all 13 games. In 2008 Landolt started every game at right tackle for the second consecutive season. Penn State ranked in the top 20 nationally in rushing, total offense, and scoring offense that season. The Nittany Lions led the Big Ten Conference in total and scoring offense, and were second in rushing and third in passing offense. Landolt was key in helping Penn State lead the Big Ten and rank fourth in the nation in fewest sacks allowed.

He was first-team All-Big Ten choice in 2009, and an Associated Press third-team All-American. Penn State finished second in the Big Ten in total offense that season, and allowed only 17 sacks in 13 games. Landolt was invited to play in the 2010 Texas vs. The Nation All-Star Challenge in El Paso, Texas following his senior season.

He earned a Bachelor of Arts in economics (supply chain and information systems) in 2009.

== Professional career ==
=== NFL draft ===
Landolt played in the 4th Annual Texas vs. The Nation All-Star Challenge in El Paso, Texas, on February 6, 2010. He and teammate Josh Hull trained in preparation for the 2010 NFL draft at TEST in Martinsville, New Jersey.

=== New York Giants ===
On Sunday April 25, 2010, he signed as an undrafted free agent with the New York Giants. He was waived by the Giants on September 4, 2010. He re-signed to the New York Giants practice squad on September 15, 2010. He was waived again on October 19, 2010.

=== San Francisco 49ers ===
The San Francisco 49ers signed Landolt to their practice squad on December 21, 2010.

=== New York Jets ===
Landolt was signed to the New York Jets' practice squad on January 12, 2011. Following the completion of the Jets' season, Landolt signed a future contract with the team on January 25, 2011. He was waived on September 2. Landolt was signed to the Jets' practice squad on October 4, 2011. He was released on October 18. He was re-signed to the practice squad on October 31.

=== New Orleans Saints ===
Landolt had a stint on the practice squad but was released on October 1, 2011.

=== New York Jets (second stint) ===
Landolt was waived from the active roster on September 24, 2012. He was signed to their practice squad on September 27, 2012. Landolt was released on October 30, 2012. He was re-signed to the practice squad on November 28, 2012. Landolt was released on December 29, 2012. He signed a future/reserve contract on December 31, 2012. Landolt was released on August 13, 2013 following an injury.
