= 2008 All-Big Ten Conference football team =

American college football all-star team

The 2008 All-Big Ten Conference football team consists of American football players chosen as All-Big Ten Conference players for the 2008 Big Ten Conference football season. The conference recognizes two official All-Big Ten selectors: (1) the Big Ten conference coaches selected separate offensive and defensive units and named first- and second-team players (the "Coaches" team); and (2) a panel of sports writers and broadcasters covering the Big Ten also selected offensive and defensive units and named first- and second-team players (the "Media" team).

== Offensive selections ==
=== Quarterbacks ===
- Daryll Clark, Penn State (Coaches-1; Media-1)
- Adam Weber, Minnesota (Coaches-2)
- Juice Williams, Illinois (Media-2)

=== Running backs ===
- Shonn Greene, Iowa (Coaches-1; Media-1)
- Javon Ringer, Michigan State (Coaches-1; Media-1)
- Beanie Wells, Ohio State (Coaches-2; Media-2)
- Evan Royster, Penn State (Coaches-2; Media-2)

=== Receivers ===
- Eric Decker, Minnesota (Coaches-1; Media-1)
- Derrick Williams, Penn State (Coaches-1; Media-2)
- Arrelious Benn, Illinois (Coaches-2; Media-1)
- David Gilreath, Wisconsin (Coaches-2)
- Deon Butler, Penn State (Media-2)

=== Centers ===
- A. Q. Shipley, Penn State (Coaches-1; Media-1)
- Rob Bruggeman, Iowa (Coaches-2; Media-2 [tie])
- Ryan McDonald, Illinois (Media-2 [tie])

=== Guards ===
- Seth Olsen, Iowa (Coaches-1; Media-1)
- Rich Ohrnberger, Penn State (Coaches-1; Media-1)
- Kraig Urbik, Wisconsin (Coaches-2; Media-2)
- Stefen Wisniewski, Penn State (Coaches-2)
- Roland Martin, Michigan State (Media-2)

=== Tackles ===
- Alex Boone, Ohio State (Coaches-1; Media-1)
- Gerald Cadogan, Penn State (Coaches-1; Media-1)
- Xavier Fulton, Illinois (Coaches-2; Media-2)
- Bryan Bulaga, Iowa (Coaches-2)
- Kyle Calloway, Iowa (Media-2)
- Jesse Miller, Michigan State (Media-2)

=== Tight ends ===
- Brandon Myers, Iowa (Coaches-1)
- Garrett Graham, Wisconsin (Coaches-2; Media-1)
- Jack Simmons, Minnesota (Media-2)

== Defensive selections ==
=== Defensive linemen ===
- Mitch King, Iowa (Coaches-1; Media-1)
- Aaron Maybin, Penn State (Coaches-1; Media-1)
- Jammie Kirlew, Indiana (Coaches-2; Media-1)
- Jared Odrick, Penn State (Coaches-1; Media-2)
- Willie VanDeSteeg, Minnesota (Coaches-2; Media-1)
- Corey Wootton, Northwestern (Coaches-1; Media-2)
- Brandon Graham, Michigan (Coaches-2)
- Matt Kroul, Iowa (Media-2)
- Mike Newkirk, Wisconsin (Coaches-2)

=== Linebackers ===
- Navorro Bowman, Penn State (Coaches-1; Media-1)
- James Laurinaitis, Ohio State (Coaches-1; Media-1)
- Greg Jones, Michigan State (Coaches-1; Media-2)
- Brit Miller, Illinois (Coaches-2; Media-1)
- Pat Angerer, Iowa (Coaches-2; Media-2)
- Marcus Freeman, Ohio State (Coaches-2; Media-2)

=== Defensive backs ===
- Vontae Davis, Illinois (Coaches-1; Media-1)
- Malcolm Jenkins, Ohio State (Coaches-1; Media-1)
- Otis Wiley, Michigan State (Coaches-1; Media-1)
- Anthony Scirrotto, Penn State (Coaches-1; Media-2)
- Allen Langford, Wisconsin (Coaches-2; Media-1)
- Traye Simmons, Minnesota (Coaches-2; Media-2)
- Kurt Coleman, Ohio State (Media-2)
- Lydell Sargeant, Penn State (Media-2)
- Amari Spievey, Iowa (Coaches-2)
- Jay Valai, Wisconsin (Coaches-2)

== Special teams ==
=== Kickers ===
- Kevin Kelly, Penn State (Coaches-1; Media-1)
- Brett Swenson, Michigan State (Coaches-2; Media-2)

=== Punter ===
- Zoltan Mesko, Michigan (Coaches-1; Media-1)
- Ryan Donahue, Iowa (Coaches-2)
- Aaron Bates, Michigan State (Media-2)

== Key ==
Bold = Consensus first-team selection by both the coaches and media

Coaches = Selected by the Big Ten Conference coaches

Media = Selected by the conference media

== See also ==
- 2008 College Football All-America Team
