= Derrick Williams (American football) =

American gridiron football player (born 1986)

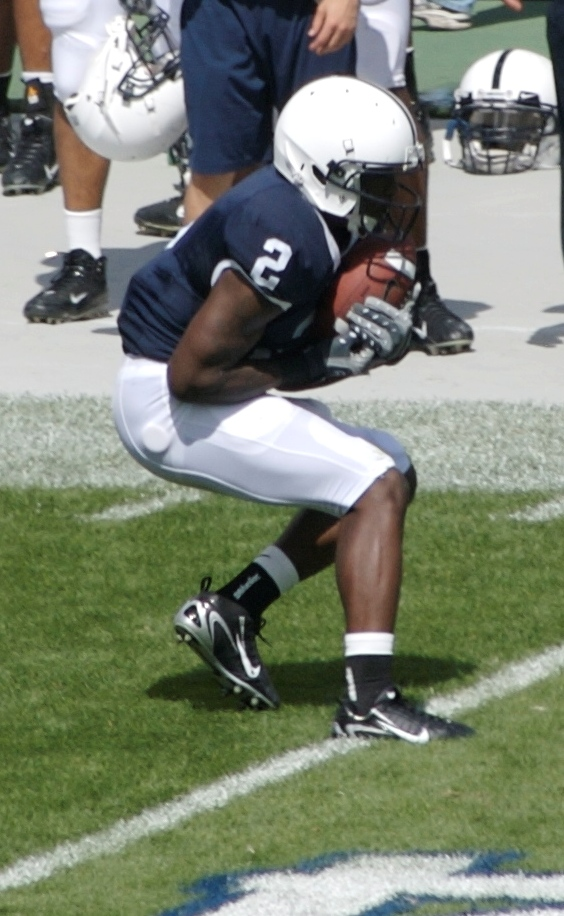
- Williams with Penn State in 2007

No. 12
- Position: Wide receiver

Personal information
- Born: July 6, 1986 (age 40); Washington, D.C., U.S.
- Listed height: 5 ft 11 in (1.80 m)
- Listed weight: 197 lb (89 kg)

Career information
- High school: Greenbelt (MD) Roosevelt
- College: Penn State
- NFL draft: 2009: 3rd round, 82nd overall pick

Career history
- Detroit Lions (2009–2010); Pittsburgh Steelers (2012)*; Toronto Argonauts (2013)*
- * Offseason or practice squad member only

Awards and highlights
- Second-team All-American (2008); Freshman All-American (2005); First-team All-Big Ten (2008); All-Big Ten Freshman Team (2005); 2007 Outback Bowl champion

Career NFL statistics
- Receptions: 9
- Receiving yards: 82
- Stats at Pro Football Reference

Derrick Williams (born July 6, 1986) is an American former professional football player who was a wide receiver in the National Football League (NFL). He was selected by the Detroit Lions with the 18th pick of the third round of the 2009 NFL draft. He was a wide receiver and 2008 team captain for the Penn State Nittany Lions.

== Early life ==
Williams was widely regarded as the top high school football prospect of 2005, coming out of Eleanor Roosevelt High School in Greenbelt, Maryland. He received scholarship offers from more than 50 Division I schools. Relentless recruiting forced him to twice change his cell phone number. He was named Rivals.com High School Junior of the Year in 2003, and was ranked as the number one recruit in the nation after his senior year.

Williams initially leaned towards attending the University of Florida, but re-opened his recruitment after the firing of head coach Ron Zook. He strongly considered offers from Texas, Oklahoma and Tennessee, before announcing live on ESPN that he would attend Penn State. Penn State was coming off four losing seasons in five years, and head coach Joe Paterno was under increasing pressure to retire. Williams relished the challenge of returning the Penn State program to its former stature, saying "I did it because I trusted in [Paterno]. He promised me I could help turn the program around and leave my mark there, which I did."

== College career ==
As a true freshman, Williams was spectacular at quarterback, running back, and wide receiver. His touchdown catch late in Penn State's matchup with Northwestern that year won the Lions that game and was nominated for a Game-Changing Performance of the Year. It was part of a four-touchdown start that was cut short by a broken arm he suffered during the Nittany Lions' October 15, 2005 loss against the University of Michigan, the team's only loss that season.

The Sporting News named Williams to the freshman All-Big Ten Conference team despite having played just seven games in 2005. He was named to the preseason All-Big Ten second-team for the 2006 season by The Sporting News.

In 2006, he returned to wide receiver for the Nittany Lions, but registered just two touchdowns all season. He played both running back and wideout in the Outback Bowl, helping Penn State to a 20–10 win against Tennessee.

He began the 2007 season with only 6 catches for 45 yards in his first two games, but had an electrifying 78-yard punt return touchdown against Notre Dame, his second career special teams touchdown. He ended the season with 55 receptions for 529 yards and 3 touchdowns. He also had 16 rushing attempts for 101 yards and a touchdown. He had a season-high ten catches for 95 yards and one score vs. in a 26–19 win over Purdue.

Prior to the 2008 season, Williams was nominated to the Maxwell and Biletnikoff Award watchlists.

Williams became the first player under the coaching of Joe Paterno to score a touchdown on a catch, run, and kick return in the same game, when he accomplished the feat against the Illinois Fighting Illini on September 27, 2008. The Nittany Lions won the game 38–24. Williams was named the Big Ten special teams player of the week following the Nittany Lions victory. At the end of the 2008 season, he was named a first-team All-Big Ten selection. He ended the season with 44 catches for 485 yards and a career-high four touchdown receptions. In his final game, the 2009 Rose Bowl loss to Southern California, he had a fourth-quarter touchdown reception.

== Professional career ==
=== Pre-draft ===
At the 2009 NFL Combine, Williams ran 4.55 seconds in the 40-yard dash. He recorded a slower time than anticipated partly because he had the flu.

Pre-draft measurables
| Height | Weight | 40-yard dash | 10-yard split | 20-yard split | 20-yard shuttle | Three-cone drill | Vertical jump | Broad jump | Bench press |
|---|---|---|---|---|---|---|---|---|---|
| 6 ft 0 in (1.83 m) | 194 lb (88 kg) | 4.6* s | 2.65 s | 1.54 s | 4.21* s | 6.96* s | 33 in (0.84 m) | 9 ft 7 in (2.92 m) | 15 reps |
All values from 2009 NFL Combine, * indicates marks from Penn St's pro day on March 18, 2009

=== Detroit Lions ===
Williams was selected by the Detroit Lions in the third round (#82 overall) of the 2009 NFL draft. He signed a three-year contract with the team on July 29, 2009. Williams was waived by the Lions on September 3, 2011.

=== Pittsburgh Steelers ===
Williams was signed by the Pittsburgh Steelers in January 2012. After playing in four pre-season games, he was released by the Steelers on August 31, 2012.

=== Toronto Argonauts ===
Williams signed with the Toronto Argonauts on March 13, 2013. He was released by the team on May 2, 2013.

== Personal life ==
Williams has a longtime friendship with former Nittany Lion linebacker LaVar Arrington. The two first met during Arrington's time with the Washington Redskins, when Williams was playing high school football in nearby Greenbelt, Maryland. Arrington gave Williams the nickname "Jesus Shuttlesworth," after the lead character—a highly coveted high school recruit—in Spike Lee's He Got Game.

Williams trained with an athletic group known as The Stable, with whom he has worked out since he was 10 years old, working on speed, agility, and endurance.
