= Kevin Landolt =

American football player (born 1975)

No. 93
- Position: Defensive tackle

Personal information
- Born: October 25, 1975 (age 51); Mount Holly, New Jersey, U.S.
- Listed height: 6 ft 4 in (1.93 m)
- Listed weight: 298 lb (135 kg)

Career information
- College: West Virginia
- NFL draft: 1999: 4th round, 121st overall pick

Career history
- Jacksonville Jaguars (1999)

Career NFL statistics
- Games played: 1
- Stats at Pro Football Reference

Kevin Joseph Landolt (born October 25, 1975) is an American former professional football player who was a defensive tackle in the National Football League (NFL). He played college football for the West Virginia Mountaineers and was selected by the Jacksonville Jaguars in the fourth round of the 1999 NFL draft.

Landolt played high school football at Holy Cross Academy, as did his brother Dennis, who also played in the NFL.

== Professional career ==
Kevin Landolt played in only five games for the Jacksonville Jaguars. He was only able to record 2 sacks of statistic, and spent time on the bench. His most notable sack was against Donovan McNabb of the Philadelphia Eagles. Later on, the Jaguars would release him, causing him to become a free agent. Landolt also had a brief stint in the XFL after being drafted by the Birmingham Thunderbolts in the 2001 XFL draft.
