= Rob Bruggeman =

American football player (born 1986)

No. 67
- Position: Center

Personal information
- Born: March 21, 1986 (age 40); Cedar Rapids, Iowa, U.S.
- Listed height: 6 ft 4 in (1.93 m)
- Listed weight: 293 lb (133 kg)

Career information
- College: Iowa
- NFL draft: 2009: undrafted

Career history
- Tampa Bay Buccaneers (2009)*; Atlanta Falcons (2009–2011); Kansas City Chiefs (2011–2012)*
- * Offseason or practice squad member only

Awards and highlights
- Second-team All-Big Ten (2008)

Career NFL statistics
- Games played: 2
- Stats at Pro Football Reference

Robert Bruggeman (born March 21, 1986) is an American former professional football player who was a center in the National Football League (NFL). He played college football for the Iowa Hawkeyes and was signed by the Tampa Bay Buccaneers as an undrafted free agent in 2009.

He was also a member of the Atlanta Falcons and Kansas City Chiefs.

== Early life ==
Bruggeman went to high school at Washington High School in Cedar Rapids, Iowa, where he earned the nickname "Big Frame" and three varsity letters playing both offensive and defensive line.

During his sophomore year, he garnered honorable mention All-Mississippi Valley Conference honors.

During his junior and senior seasons, Bruggeman earned first-team All-Conference distinction as well as elite first team All-State honors. Bruggeman also helped the Warriors post a 21–2 record over those two years, with one loss coming at the end of each season. He was high school teammates with New Orleans Saints wide receiver Adrian Arrington.

== College career ==
After a highly successful high school career, Bruggeman decided to attend the University of Iowa as a preferred walk-on with teammate Gavin McGrath in 2004.

After redshirting during his first year with the Hawkeyes in 2004, he saw action in games against Ball State and Minnesota during the 2005 season. Injuries limited his playing time in 2006, but Bruggeman was able to contribute in several games towards the end of 2007. Though he was unable to play in the first nine games of the season due to injury, Bruggeman saw action against Northwestern, Minnesota, and Western Michigan to end the Hawkeyes' 2007 campaign.

Iowa's 2008 season turned out to be a formative one for Bruggeman, starting with first-string center designation from Iowa head coach Kirk Ferentz following spring practice. Bruggeman started every game at center for the Hawkeyes in 2008, including their resounding Outback Bowl victory over the South Carolina Gamecocks.

Bruggeman earned first team District Seven Academic All-America honors and Academic All-Big Ten accolades following his senior season. He was named to the second team All-Big Ten list by the league’s coaches and media.

== Professional career ==
=== Pre-draft ===
After playing at center for the Hawkeyes, Bruggeman was one of 330 players invited to the NFL Scouting Combine. Because of a lingering injury, Bruggeman opted not to participate in the running drills at the combine, but did post an impressive 30 reps of 225 pounds in the bench press exercise, good for 10th best among offensive linemen and 19th best among all combine participants. He later improved his measurables at the Iowa Pro Day.

Pre-draft measurables
Height	Weight	Arm length	Hand span	40-yard dash	10-yard split	20-yard split	20-yard shuttle	Three-cone drill	Vertical jump	Broad jump	Bench press
6 ft 4 in (1.93 m)	293 lb (133 kg)	30 3/4 in (0.78 m)	9 1/4 in (0.23 m)	5.05 s	1.72 s	2.94 s	4.69 s	7.69 s	33 in (0.84 m)	8 ft 8 in (2.64 m)	32 reps
All values from NFL Combine/Iowa's Pro Day

=== Tampa Bay Buccaneers ===
After going undrafted during the 2009 NFL draft, Bruggeman was signed to a free agent deal by the Tampa Bay Buccaneers on May 1, 2009. He played in all four pre-season games. He was waived by the Buccaneers in September 2009.

=== Atlanta Falcons ===
The Atlanta Falcons signed Bruggeman as a free agent on September 7, 2009. He was added to the Falcons' practice squad on September 8. After his contract expired following the season, Bruggeman was signed to a future contract on January 4, 2010. He was waived on September 12, 2011.

=== Kansas City Chiefs ===
The Chiefs added Bruggeman to their practice squad on November 29, 2011, one day after waiving Jared Gaither and promoting David Sims from the practice squad to the 53-man roster.
