= Maurice Evans (American football) =

American gridiron football player (born 1988)

No. 74, 76, 96
- Position: Defensive end

Personal information
- Born: August 14, 1988 (age 38); Brooklyn, New York, U.S.
- Listed height: 6 ft 2 in (1.88 m)
- Listed weight: 264 lb (120 kg)

Career information
- High school: New York (NY) Christ The King Regional
- College: Penn State
- NFL draft: 2009: undrafted

Career history
- New York Giants (2009)*; Tampa Bay Buccaneers (2009); Carolina Panthers (2009)*; Tampa Bay Buccaneers (2009–2010)*; Chicago Bears (2010)*; BC Lions (2012–2013)
- * Offseason or practice squad member only

Awards and highlights
- First-team All-Big Ten (2007)
- Stats at Pro Football Reference
- Stats at CFL.ca (archive)

Maurice D. Evans (born August 14, 1988) is a former gridiron football defensive end. He was signed by the New York Giants as an undrafted free agent in 2009. He played college football at Penn State.

Evans has also been a member of the Tampa Bay Buccaneers, Carolina Panthers and Chicago Bears.

== Early life ==
While playing for Christ The King Regional High School, Evans was a 4-star recruit by rivals.com and a First-team all state selection and was ranked the nations sixth best defensive end coming out of high school after recording 92 tackles, four sacks and four fumble recoveries as a senior. Evans was named an Army All-American as a senior and played in the U.S. Army All-American Bowl. He was heavily recruited by USC, Penn State, and Notre Dame.

== College career ==
Evans was an immediate contributor in 2006 as a true freshman, seeing action in all 13 games. He recorded 12 tackles (7 solo), 3.5 tackles for loss and 1.5 sacks. He would be named to the First-team of the Sporting News's the All-Big Ten Freshman Team. In 2007—Evans' first starting season at defensive end—Evans recorded 12.5 sacks (including 3.5 against Indiana). He also had 54 tackles, with 21.5 tackles for loss, to go with the 12.5 sacks, broke up 3 passes in coverage, and forced 5 fumbles. He was a finalist for the Ted Hendricks Award as a sophomore.

By the start of the 2008 season Evans had been named to numerous preseason All-American teams, including Phil Steele's All-American first-team. He was also on the 2008 Bednarik, Lombardi, and Nagurski award watchlists.

In 10 games in 2008, Evans recorded just 34 tackles, 4.5 tackles for loss, and 3 sacks. Evans elected to leave Penn State after to 2008 season and enter the NFL draft. He trained for the NFL Scouting Combine at Power Train Sports Performance in Millersville, Pennsylvania.

== Professional career ==
=== Pre-draft ===
Pre-draft measurables
Height	Weight	Arm length	Hand span	40-yard dash	10-yard split	20-yard split	20-yard shuttle	Three-cone drill	Vertical jump	Broad jump	Bench press
6 ft 1 1/2 in (1.87 m)	274 lb (124 kg)	34 in (0.86 m)	9 3/4 in (0.25 m)	5.09 s	1.82 s	2.95 s	4.57 s	7.32 s	29 in (0.74 m)	8 ft 11 in (2.72 m)	17 reps
Arm and hand spans from Pro Day, all other values from NFL Combine.

=== New York Giants ===
Evans was signed as an undrafted free agent by the New York Giants after not being taken in the 2009 NFL draft. He was waived during final cuts on September 4, 2009.

=== First stint with Buccaneers ===
Evans was claimed off waivers by the Tampa Bay Buccaneers on September 6, 2009. He was waived on September 14.

=== Carolina Panthers ===
Evans was signed to the Carolina Panthers practice squad on September 24. He was released on October 3 when defensive tackle Ra'Shon Harris was re-signed to the practice squad.

=== Second stint with Buccaneers ===
Evans was re-signed by the Tampa Bay Buccaneers on October 7, 2009. He was waived on October 10, to make room for Tanard Jackson. Evans was signed to the Buccaneers' practice squad on October 28.

He was waived on June 14, 2010.

=== Chicago Bears ===
Evans signed with the Chicago Bears on August 4, 2010.

Evans was waived by the Bears on August 30, 2010.

=== BC Lions ===
Evans signed with the BC Lions on May 1, 2012. He was released by the Lions on May 24, 2013.

== Personal life ==
Evans has one child (Amari)

Evans' father Michael Evans, was stabbed to death on Christmas Eve, 1988, near the family's home in East New York, Brooklyn,
