= Gerald Cadogan =

American gridiron football player (born 1986)

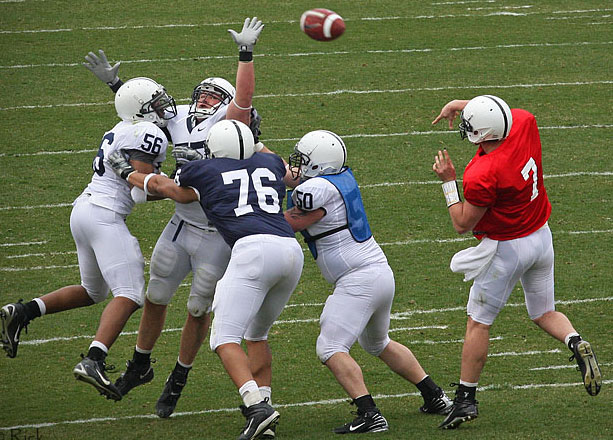
- Penn State offensive tackle Cadogan (76) pass protects for quarterback Pat Devlin (7) during the 2008 Blue and White scrimmage

No. 63, 76
- Position: Offensive tackle

Personal information
- Born: January 16, 1986 (age 40); Oakland, California, U.S.
- Listed height: 6 ft 5 in (1.96 m)
- Listed weight: 309 lb (140 kg)

Career information
- College: Penn State

Career history
- 2009: Carolina Panthers*
- 2009: Cincinnati Bengals*
- 2009: San Diego Chargers*
- 2009: Philadelphia Eagles*
- 2010: Indianapolis Colts*
- 2011: Calgary Stampeders
- 2012: Las Vegas Locomotives
- 2012: Toronto Argonauts*
- * Offseason or practice squad member only

Awards and highlights
- Grey Cup champion (2012); First-team All-Big Ten (2008); Big Ten Sportsmanship Award (2008)
- Stats at CFL.ca (archive)

Gerald Anthony Cadogan (born January 16, 1986) is an American former football offensive tackle. He was signed by the Carolina Panthers as an undrafted free agent in 2009. He played college football at Penn State.

Cadogan was also a member of the Cincinnati Bengals, San Diego Chargers, Philadelphia Eagles, Indianapolis Colts, Calgary Stampeders, Las Vegas Locomotives, and Toronto Argonauts.

== Early life ==
Cadogan excelled in football at Portsmouth High School assisting the Trojans to multiple playoff appearances. Cadogan was a four-sport star at Portsmouth High School, lettering in football, track, swimming, and basketball. He was named first-team Associated Press All-State in football his senior season. The Youngstown Vindicator named Cadogan All-Conference twice. He was also an Ohio finalist for the Wendy's High School Heisman, and was the Portsmouth Daily Times Sportsman-of-the-Year.

He played in the 2004 Big 33 Football Classic and the Ohio North-South All-Star game.

== College career ==
Gerald decided to attend Penn State. After redshirting his freshman (2004) season, Cadogan worked his way to second on the depth chart at left tackle behind future first-round draft pick, Levi Brown in 2005. He earned Academic All-Big Ten honors that season.

Cadogan was switched to guard for the 2006 season, appearing in 11 games and helping tailback Tony Hunt compile the second of two 1,000-yard rushing seasons. He returned to his natural position of tackle in 2007, and started all 13 games for the Nittany Lions and earned first-team Academic All-America and Academic All-Big Ten honors that year.

Cadogan was a 2008 candidate for college football's prestigious Draddy Trophy, presented annually to the nation's top college football student-athlete. At season's end, he was named a consensus first-team All-Big Ten selection and was awarded the conference's Sportsmanship Award. He was also named an Academic All-American for a second time.

== Professional career ==
Cadogan was invited to the 2009 NFL Scouting Combine where he ran 4.99 in the 40-yard dash (fifth among offensive linemen at the combine). Despite most draft pundits projecting Cadogan to be selected in the third or fourth round of the 2009 NFL draft, he was not selected at all. He signed with the Carolina Panthers on April 26, 2009. He was waived on August 31.

Cadogan was signed to the Cincinnati Bengals practice squad on November 3. He was released on November 10.

Cadogan was signed to the San Diego Chargers practice squad on November 19. He was released on December 5.

Cadogan was signed to the Philadelphia Eagles' practice squad on December 8.

After his contract with the Eagles expired at season's end, Cadogan signed a future contract with the Indianapolis Colts on January 22, 2010. He was waived injured before training camp and released with an injury settlement.

Cadogan was signed to the Calgary Stampeders’ practice squad on October 21, 2010—prior to week 17 of the 2010 CFL season. He was promoted to the active roster during 2011 training camp, and appeared in the Stamps’ first preseason game versus the BC Lions on June 15, 2011. On September 13, 2011, Cadogan was released by the Stampeders.

Cadogan was briefly a member of the Las Vegas Locomotives of the United Football League in 2012.

On October 30, 2012, Cadogan signed with the Toronto Argonauts, later winning the 100th Grey Cup.

== After football ==
Cadogan returned to Portsmouth, where he teaches and coached the swimming and boys track teams and was an assistant football coach at Portsmouth High School, his alma mater. In July 2019, he was named the first-ever swimming coach at Shawnee State University, a NAIA school in Portsmouth.

== Personal life ==
Cadogan is an avid musician, playing many instruments, singing and arranging songs. He began singing in the church choir at age four, and learned to play a slew of instruments in his youth, including the trumpet, trombone, piano, guitar, drums, oboe, and the euphonium. Cadogan played trumpet with his high school marching band, often while still wearing his football uniform during halftime shows. He once even conducted the Penn State Blue Band following a 2007 home victory at Beaver Stadium.

Cadogan has released two gospel albums. He also sang the national anthem a cappella at a 2008 State College campaign rally for presidential candidate Barack Obama.
