= Aaron Maybin =

American gridiron football player (born 1988)

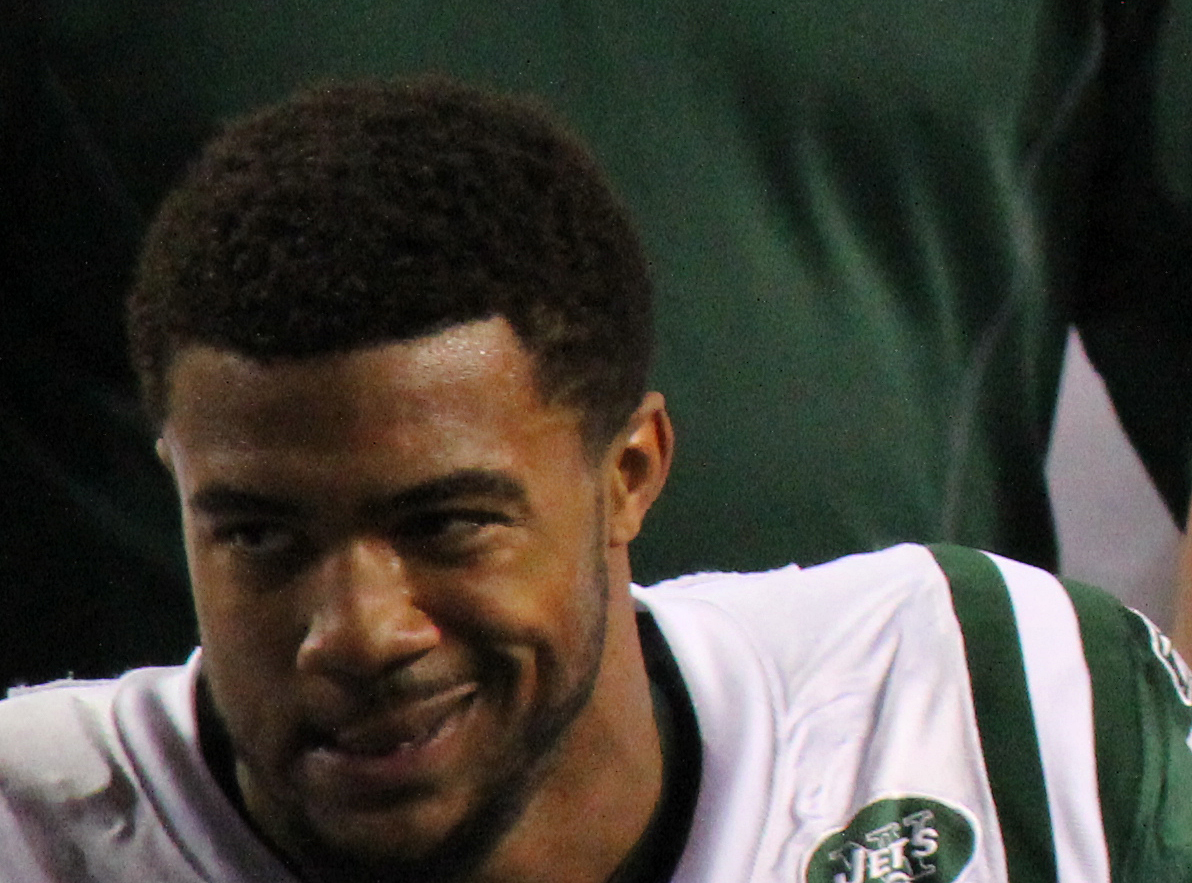
- Maybin with the New York Jets in 2011

No. 58, 51
- Position: Linebacker

Personal information
- Born: April 6, 1988 (age 38); Baltimore, Maryland, U.S.
- Listed height: 6 ft 4 in (1.93 m)
- Listed weight: 237 lb (108 kg)

Career information
- High school: Ellicott City (MD) Mt. Hebron
- College: Penn State (2006–2008)
- NFL draft: 2009: 1st round, 11th overall pick

Career history
- Buffalo Bills (2009–2010); New York Jets (2011–2012); Cincinnati Bengals (2013)*; Toronto Argonauts (2013)
- * Offseason or practice squad member only

Awards and highlights
- Consensus All-American (2008); First-team All-Big Ten (2008)

Career NFL statistics
- Total tackles: 37
- Sacks: 6.0
- Forced fumbles: 5
- Stats at Pro Football Reference

Aaron Michael Maybin (born April 6, 1988) is an American former professional football player who was a linebacker in the National Football League (NFL) and Canadian Football League (CFL). He played college football for the Penn State Nittany Lions, earning consensus All-American honors. He was selected by the Buffalo Bills in the first round of the 2009 NFL draft, and also played for the New York Jets.

Maybin's professional football career lasted until 2013, after which he became a full-time professional artist. He is also the founder of Project Mayhem, and the author of the 2017 book Art Activism. He is a teacher at Matthew A. Henson Elementary in his hometown of Baltimore, Maryland.

== College career ==
Maybin attended Pennsylvania State University, where he played for coach Joe Paterno's Penn State Nittany Lions football team from 2006 to 2008. He redshirted during the 2006 season. He had 12 tackles, with 4.5 tackles for losses, one forced fumble and one pass breakup in 2007. He was fourth on the team with four sacks and was named to the Sporting News Freshman All-Big Ten team.

Maybin had a breakout season in 2008. He was selected as the Big Ten Defensive Player of the Week following a six-tackle, two-sack performance in Penn State's 48–7 defeat of Wisconsin, in which he also forced two key fumbles. He was named a Mid-season All-American by Sports Illustrated, College Football News and CBS Sports. At the end of the season, he was named a consensus All-American and a consensus first-team All-Big Ten selection.

Maybin was on the 2008 Walter Camp Award watchlist and was one of three finalists for the 2008 Ted Hendricks and Chuck Bednarik awards, awarded annually to collegiate football's top defensive end and defensive players, respectively. He was named the Pigskin Club of Washington, D.C. National Defensive Player of the Year.

== Professional career ==
=== Pre-draft ===
On January 9, 2009, Maybin indicated he would be going pro and make himself available for the 2009 NFL draft. He was projected as a late first round pick. Maybin trained for the NFL Scouting Combine at Power Train Sports Performance in Millersville, Pennsylvania.

Pre-draft measurables
Height	Weight	40-yard dash	10-yard split	20-yard split	20-yard shuttle	Three-cone drill	Vertical jump	Broad jump	Bench press	Wonderlic
6 ft 4 in (1.93 m)	249 lb (113 kg)	4.64 s	1.54 s	2.66 s	4.38 s	7.52 s	40 in (1.02 m)	10 ft 10 in (3.30 m)	22 reps	25
10/20 splits unavailable. Broad jump from Penn State Pro Day, all others from NFL Combine.

=== Buffalo Bills ===
On August 21, 2009, Maybin agreed to a five-year deal with the Buffalo Bills after being drafted with the 11th pick in the first round. He finished the season with 18 tackles and zero sacks while playing in all 16 regular season games during his 2009 rookie year.

In his second season, through six games he played on only 66 downs with five tackles and zero sacks. He was deactivated as a healthy-scratch for the team's sixth game at Baltimore.

On August 15, 2011, Maybin was waived by the Bills.

=== New York Jets ===
The New York Jets signed Maybin to a one-year contract for the league minimum on August 17, 2011. He was waived on September 4, 2011. Maybin was re-signed by the Jets on September 28, 2011.

In his first regular season game with the Jets, Maybin recorded his first career sack, a strip-sack, against Joe Flacco on October 2, 2011. Maybin recorded his second career sack, another strip sack, on October 17 against Matt Moore. He recorded another sack for the second consecutive week on October 23 against Philip Rivers. Maybin recorded the first two-sack game of his career against the Bills, on November 27, 2011. On December 4, 2011, against the Washington Redskins, Maybin sacked Rex Grossman and forced a fumble that was recovered by Calvin Pace. After that the Jets went on to win the game 34–19. Maybin's ability to get to the quarterback made it difficult for some offensive linemen to contain him, resulting in his team-leading 6 sacks in 2011.

Maybin was released by the Jets on November 13, 2012. Maybin, in limited playing time, recorded one tackle and no sacks and was credited with nine quarterback hits through ten games.

=== Cincinnati Bengals ===
On January 25, 2013, Maybin was signed by the Cincinnati Bengals to a Reserve/Future contract. On August 18, 2013, he was released by the Bengals.

=== Toronto Argonauts ===
On October 27, 2013, the Toronto Argonauts announced that they had signed Maybin. He was added to their practice roster. Maybin played in one game against the Montreal Alouettes on November 1, 2013, recording 2 defensive tackles.

On May 13, 2014, Maybin announced his retirement.

=== NFL statistics ===
Year	Team	GP	COMB	TOTAL	AST	SACK	FF	FR	FR YDS	INT	IR YDS	AVG IR	LNG	TD	PD
2009	BUF	16	18	11	7	0.0	1	0	0	0	0	0	0	0	0
2010	BUF	11	6	4	2	0.0	0	0	0	0	0	0	0	0	0
2011	NYJ	13	11	10	1	6.0	4	0	0	0	0	0	0	0	0
2012	NYJ	8	1	1	0	0.0	0	0	0	0	0	0	0	0	0
Career		48	36	26	10	6.0	5	0	0	0	0	0	0	0	0

== Artistic career ==
Prior to college Maybin received college level courses from Maryland Institute College of Art, and then majored in integrative arts at Penn State. His first commission as an artist was for the State of Maryland when Maybin was eleven years old. Maybin, one of four children, was one of the first people to attend college in his family. He then continued his art career throughout his NFL tenure. During his career his paintings were a major part of the Hard Knocks reality television show when it covered the Bengals. During this time, Maybin claims to have used the pressure and stress of performing in professional football to influence his artistic output.

Maybin focused on his art full-time after his NFL career, with paintings sold for as much as $20,000 as of 2013, and prints of his original sold online. He has also set about specific artistic projects. For example, following an incident he had with a police officer racial profiling him in Baltimore following in the first two weeks of the death of Freddie Gray, Maybin began a photography project in the surrounding area and painted images of the neighborhood as it reacted to the social trauma.

Maybin's studio is based in Baltimore, Maryland. He is also the founder of "Project Mayhem", taking his college football nickname, which performs non-profit artistic activities in the public. The foundation supports the artwork of students in the Baltimore area. In 2017 Maybin released the book Art Activism. In describing the book, The Undefeated wrote, "The work is both an ode to Maybin's hometown and a lament of the city's many challenges. He uses his paintings, photography, poetry and prose to convey both the pride and pain of Baltimore."

== Personal life ==
Maybin was born to Constance and Michael Maybin in Baltimore. He was diagnosed with borderline attention deficit disorder when he was young. His parents sought out alternatives to drug treatment which included sketching, sculpting, wrestling, baseball and football, which he began play at the Pee-Wee level at the age of 5. When Maybin was 6, his mother died after going into cardiac arrest during child birth. His father later remarried to an English missionary, Violette Grant, whom Maybin calls his mother. He attended Mount Hebron High School in Ellicott City.

While at Penn State, Maybin spoke frequently by phone with former Nittany Lion linebacker LaVar Arrington. The two first met during Arrington's stint with the Washington Redskins, when Maybin was playing at nearby Mount Hebron High School. Arrington has joked about knowing Maybin "before he had muscles." Arrington now serves as Maybin's manager.

In 2009, Maybin founded Project Mayhem, a charitable organization established to "provide aid, both personal and economic, to help underprivileged and at risk youth excel beyond their current conditions."

Maybin's cousin Cameron Maybin played in Major League Baseball.

Maybin was roommates with linebacker NaVorro Bowman while at Penn State. He pursued a double major in communications and integrative arts. Maybin became a member of the Delta Theta chapter of Kappa Alpha Psi fraternity in April 2008.
