= Anthony Scirrotto =

American football player (born 1986)

No. 7
- Position: Safety

Personal information
- Born: October 21, 1986 (age 40); Paulsboro, New Jersey, U.S.
- Listed height: 6 ft 0 in (1.83 m)
- Listed weight: 202 lb (92 kg)

Career information
- College: Penn State
- NFL draft: 2009: undrafted

Career history
- Carolina Panthers (2009)*; New York Giants (2009)*; Philadelphia Eagles (2010)*
- * Offseason or practice squad member only

Awards and highlights
- 2× First-team All-Big Ten (2006, 2008)

Anthony Paul Scirrotto (born October 21, 1986) is an American former professional football player who was a safety in the National Football League (NFL). He played college football for the Penn State Nittany Lions. He was signed by the Carolina Panthers as an undrafted free agent in 2009.

Scirrotto was also a member of the New York Giants and Philadelphia Eagles.

== Early life ==
Scirotto is from West Deptford Township, New Jersey. During his senior season at West Deptford High School, Scirrotto was named a PrepStar All-American defensive back, First-team Associated Press All-State in both football and baseball, First-team The Philadelphia Inquirer and South Jersey Player of the Year, First-team All Colonial Conference, and Scholar Athlete of the Year. He was a four-year starter at defensive back and led his team to three consecutive South Jersey Group II State Championships in 2002, 2003 and 2004, including undefeated 12-0 seasons in 2003 and 2004 as the team's quarterback and free safety. Scirrotto grabbed 26 interceptions during his high school campaign.

Scirrotto, also a prolific baseball pitcher and shortstop, was projected to be an early second round pick in the 2004 Major League Baseball draft. Scirrotto reportedly declined interest in the MLB Draft in order to play football under Head Coach Joe Paterno and pursue a higher education.

== College career ==
In 2005, Scirrotto received considerable playing time as a true freshman at Penn State as both a safety and punt returner, and he secured his first career interception. In 2006, Scirrotto achieved prominence as a defensive playmaker when he led all players in the Big Ten Conference in interceptions with six. He also led the conference in interception return yards with 122. Additionally, he was second among all players in the Big Ten in passes defended with 14. Among all Division I-A players, Scirrotto was fifth in the nation in interception return yards and tied for 11th in total interceptions.

Scirrotto was the team's so-called "ironman" in 2006, participating in a team-leading 1,001 separate plays. In addition to his play from the safety position, Scirrotto garnered attention for making momentum shifting plays on Special Teams, returning an onside kick for a touchdown against the University of Illinois, blocking a punt against Michigan State University, and as a punt returner.

As a result of his play, the sports media named Scirrotto 2006 First-team All-Big Ten Conference. Scirrotto also earned a spot on the ESPN.com All-Bowl Team, a team composed of players with the best individual performances in postseason Bowl games. He was recognized for his efforts in the Nittany Lions' 20-10 victory over then-No. 17 University of Tennessee in the Outback Bowl on New Year's Day. Scirrotto recorded eight tackles (six solo), grabbed his sixth interception, and sparked the defense when he delivered arguably the Nittany Lions' biggest hit on then Tennessee wide receiver, Jayson Swain. He also caused two pass break-ups.

In 2007, Scirrotto extended his string of starts to 26 games. For the second consecutive year, Scirrotto led the Nittany Lions in interceptions with 3 and number of plays with 1,029. As a result of securing his 10th career interception, Scirrotto ended his junior season within 1 interception of entering the Top 10 in Penn State history.

The Sporting News named Scirrotto to the 2008 preseason first-team All-Big Ten Conference team. At season's end, he was named a first-team All-Big Ten selection.

In 2008, Scirrotto committed a crucial pass interference penalty late in the 4th quarter against the University of Iowa that cost Penn State a chance at an undefeated season and a possible birth in the National Championship Game.

Scirrotto was selected in the 50th round at the number 1502 overall pick by the Kansas City Royals in the 2009 Major League Baseball draft, despite not having played baseball since his senior year of high school in 2005.

=== 2007 Off-campus incident ===
In a much publicized event, Scirrotto and his girlfriend were accosted, assaulted and battered by two Penn State students after a confrontation with them and a third man on a State College street on March 31, 2007. As a result of the attack, the two assailants were charged with harassment and criminal mischief respectively. One of the assailants was accused of striking Scirrotto in the face and the other of destroying his personal property. A Pennsylvania District Judge found both of Scirrotto's attackers guilty of those charges. In the early morning of April 1, 2007, less than an hour after the attack on Scirrotto, police alleged that Scirrotto and several teammates were involved in a confrontation with the assailants and several others at an off-campus apartment party. As a result of the alleged confrontation at the apartment party, Scirrotto was charged with felony burglary and criminal solicitation, as well as four related misdemeanors.

On August 20, 2007, Centre County, Pennsylvania, Presiding Judge Charles C. Brown Jr. granted, in part, a Motion for Habeas Corpus, dismissing four of the six charges brought against Scirrotto. Presiding Judge Brown ruled that the Commonwealth of Pennsylvania failed to proffer the basic, prima facie evidence, necessary to submit Scirrotto to trial on charges of burglary, two counts of criminal solicitation, or assault. Judge Brown held that the Commonwealth did not offer any evidence that Scirrotto entered the apartment party with the intent to commit a crime therein. The Judge also ruled that there was no evidence that Scirrotto solicited any teammates to confront the men who had earlier attacked him. Additionally, Judge Brown held that there was no evidence that Scirrotto assaulted anyone in connection with the earlier attack upon him, or during the alleged apartment party confrontation.

On February 14, 2008, the remaining charges against Scirrotto were dismissed in return for Scirrotto pleading guilty to a reduced misdemeanor count for trespass. Scirrotto was sentenced to a year probation, 25 days community service, and payment of a $500 fine as part of the plea agreement.

== Professional career ==
=== Carolina Panthers ===
Scirrotto was signed as an undrafted free agent out of Penn State by the Carolina Panthers immediately following the 2009 NFL draft but was released before the start of training camp.

=== New York Giants ===
Scirrotto was signed to the New York Giants' practice squad on November 24, 2009. He was released a week later on December 1.

=== Philadelphia Eagles ===
Scirrotto was signed by the Philadelphia Eagles on August 16, 2010, after FS Antoine Harris was placed on the season-ending injured reserve list. Scirrotto was waived on September 3.
