= Stefen Wisniewski =

American football player (born 1989)

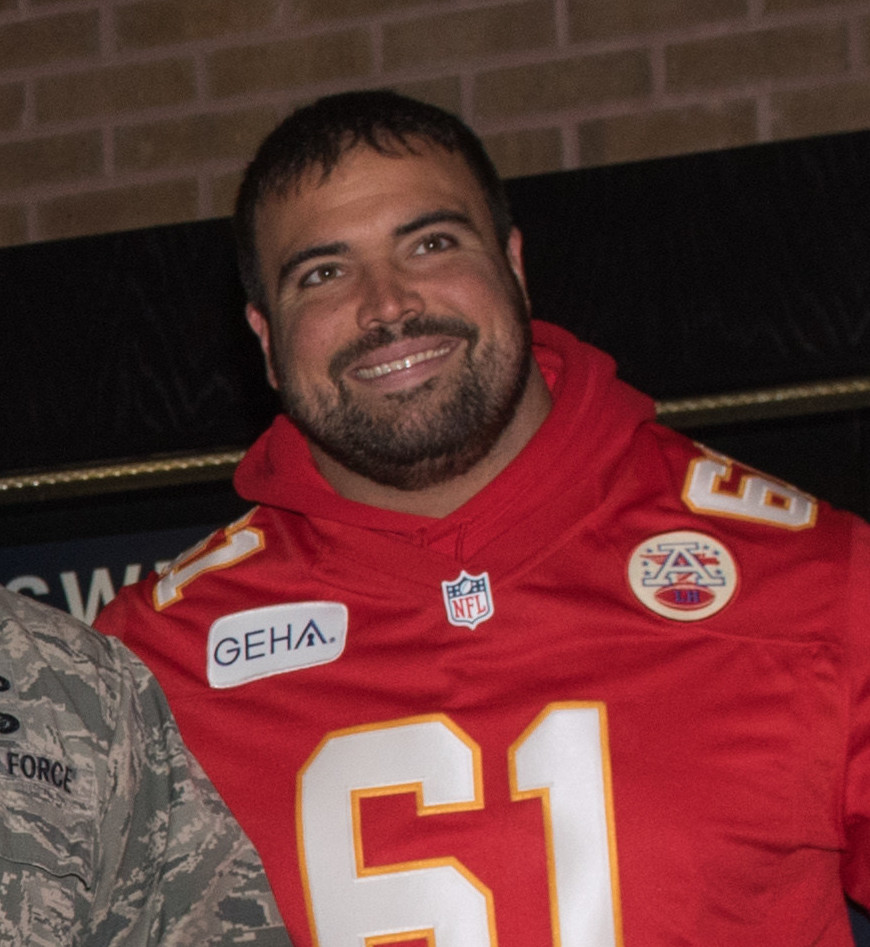
- Wisniewski with the Kansas City Chiefs in 2019

No. 61
- Positions: Guard, center

Personal information
- Born: March 22, 1989 (age 37); Pittsburgh, Pennsylvania, U.S.
- Listed height: 6 ft 3 in (1.91 m)
- Listed weight: 305 lb (138 kg)

Career information
- High school: Central Catholic (Pittsburgh)
- College: Penn State (2007–2010)
- NFL draft: 2011: 2nd round, 48th overall pick

Career history
- Oakland Raiders (2011–2014); Jacksonville Jaguars (2015); Philadelphia Eagles (2016–2018); Kansas City Chiefs (2019); Pittsburgh Steelers (2020); Kansas City Chiefs (2020)

Awards and highlights
- 2× Super Bowl champion (LII, LIV); PFWA All-Rookie Team (2011); Built Ford Tough Offensive Line of the Year (2017); First-team All-American (2010); 2× First-team All-Big Ten (2009, 2010); Second-team All-Big Ten (2008)

Career NFL statistics
- Games played: 139
- Games started: 106
- Stats at Pro Football Reference

Stefen David Wisniewski (born March 22, 1989) is an American former professional football player who was a guard and center in the National Football League (NFL). He was selected by the Oakland Raiders in the second round of the 2011 NFL draft out of Penn State. He also played for the Jacksonville Jaguars, Philadelphia Eagles, Kansas City Chiefs, and Pittsburgh Steelers.

== College career ==
Wisniewski became the first Penn State Football student-athlete to be named an ESPN Academic All-American three times, having been a first team selection in 2008, 2009, and 2010. He became Penn State's 95th first team All-American at the conclusion of the 2010 season. Prior to the 2011 NFL draft, Wisniewski was regarded as one of the top center prospects available.

== Professional career ==
Pre-draft measurables
Height	Weight	Arm length	Hand span	Wingspan	40-yard dash	10-yard split	20-yard split	20-yard shuttle	Three-cone drill	Vertical jump	Broad jump	Bench press
6 ft 3 in (1.91 m)	313 lb (142 kg)	33 in (0.84 m)	10 3/8 in (0.26 m)	6 ft 7 1/8 in (2.01 m)	5.35 s	1.87 s	3.11 s	4.63 s	7.51 s	28.5 in (0.72 m)	8 ft 4 in (2.54 m)	30 reps
All values from NFL Combine

=== Oakland Raiders ===
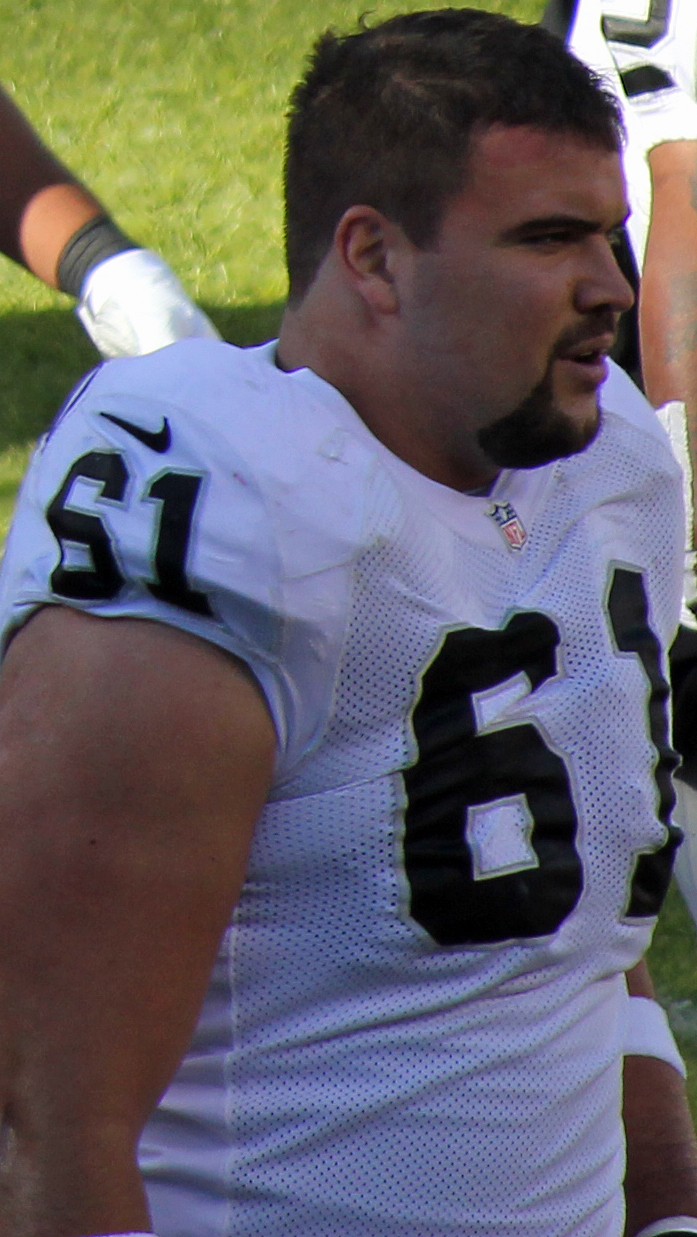
Wisniewski playing for the Raiders in 2014.

The Oakland Raiders selected Wisniewski in the second round with the 48th overall pick in the 2011 NFL draft. His uncle, Steve Wisniewski, was an 8-time Pro Bowl guard for the Raiders and was selected in the second round (29th overall) of the 1989 NFL draft. Wisniewski elected not to wear his uncle's No. 76, stating that he wished to create his own legacy with his college No. 61 instead.

He signed with the Raiders shortly before the beginning of the 2011 training camp.

At the beginning of the 2011 season, coach Hue Jackson named Wisniewski the Raiders' starting left guard, placed between Samson Satele at center and Jared Veldheer at left tackle. On opening day of the 2011 NFL season, the offensive line cleared the way for 190 rushing yards and a victory over the Denver Broncos.

Wisniewski was named the Pepsi NFL Rookie of the Week for Week 3 of the 2011 NFL season, after the Oakland offensive line cleared the way for 234 rushing yards and allowing only one sack against the New York Jets. His lead block on a pivotal fourth-quarter touchdown run gave Oakland a two-score lead. In January 2012, Wisniewski was named to the Pro Football Weekly All-Rookie team for his outstanding rookie season as starting left guard. Wisniewski helped pave the way for the NFL's 7th ranked rushing attack and anchored an offensive line that only allowed 25 sacks, tied for 3rd best in the NFL. With the departure of Samson Satele to the Indianapolis Colts in the 2012 offseason, Wisniewski became the Raiders' starting center.

=== Jacksonville Jaguars ===
Wisniewski signed a one-year contract with the Jacksonville Jaguars on April 18, 2015. He started all 16 games at center for the Jaguars in 2015.

=== Philadelphia Eagles ===
On April 4, 2016, Wisniewski signed a one-year contract with the Philadelphia Eagles. On March 10, 2017, he signed a three-year contract extension with the Eagles. Wisniewski played in 14 games and started 11 in the 2017 NFL season. The team went 13–3 and earned a first round bye. The Eagles defeated both the Atlanta Falcons and Minnesota Vikings to reach Super Bowl LII. The Eagles defeated the New England Patriots 41–33 to win their first Super Bowl.

In 2018, Wisniewski entered the season as the starting left guard, but was then benched in Week 5 in favor of Isaac Seumalo. He started the final three weeks of the regular season after Seumalo was sidelined with a pectoral injury.

On March 11, 2019, the Eagles declined the team option on Wisniewski's contract, making him an unrestricted free agent. On May 13, 2019, Wisniewski re-signed with the Eagles. He was released during final roster cuts on August 31, 2019.

=== Kansas City Chiefs (first stint) ===
On October 9, 2019, Wisniewski was signed by the Kansas City Chiefs. He won his second Super Bowl championship when the Chiefs defeated the San Francisco 49ers in Super Bowl LIV by a score of 31–20.

=== Pittsburgh Steelers ===
On March 26, 2020, the Pittsburgh Steelers signed Wisniewski to a two-year, $2.85 million contract that included a signing bonus of $375,000. He joined his hometown team as a potential replacement for the retiring left guard Ramon Foster. He started at right guard in the Steelers' 2020 season opener against the New York Giants, as regular starter David DeCastro was injured. Wisniewski suffered a chest injury in the game and was placed on injured reserve on September 18, 2020. He was activated on November 4, 2020, but then waived three days later.

=== Kansas City Chiefs (second stint) ===
On November 24, 2020, Wisniewski was signed to the Chiefs' practice squad. He was elevated to the active roster on December 5 and 12 for the team's weeks 13 and 14 games against the Denver Broncos and Miami Dolphins, and reverted to the practice squad after each game. He was promoted to the active roster on December 19, 2020.

=== Retirement ===
On August 26, 2021, Wisniewski announced his retirement from the NFL after 10 seasons.

== Personal life ==
Wisniewski comes from an athletic family; his father Leo Wisniewski played four seasons for the Colts as a nose tackle, while his uncle Steve Wisniewski was an eight-time Pro Bowl guard with the Raiders and served as the team's assistant offensive line coach in 2011. He played in the 2007 U.S. Army All-American Bowl. Wisniewski is a Christian.
