= Rich Ohrnberger =

American football player (born 1986)

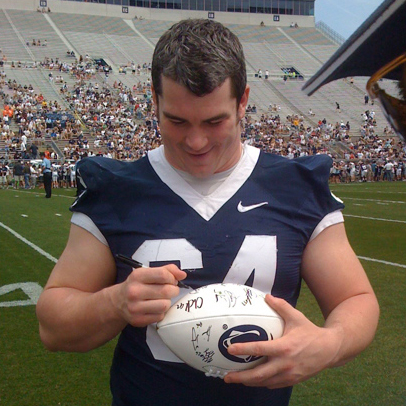
- Ohrnberger signs autographs prior to Penn State's 2008 Blue & White spring scrimmage

No. 62, 74, 72, 60
- Position: Guard / Center

Personal information
- Born: February 14, 1986 (age 40); East Meadow, New York, U.S.
- Listed height: 6 ft 2 in (1.88 m)
- Listed weight: 300 lb (136 kg)

Career information
- High school: East Meadow
- College: Penn State
- NFL draft: 2009: 4th round, 123rd overall pick

Career history
- New England Patriots (2009–2011); Arizona Cardinals (2012); San Diego Chargers (2013–2014)

Awards and highlights
- First-team All-Big Ten (2008); Second-team All-Big Ten (2007)

Career NFL statistics
- Games played: 31
- Games started: 5
- Stats at Pro Football Reference

Richard Paul Ohrnberger (born February 14, 1986) is an American sports news satirist and former professional football offensive guard. He was selected by the New England Patriots in the fourth round of the 2009 NFL draft. He played college football at Penn State.

The Adam Sandler movie, The Waterboy, inspired Ohrnberger to try out for his middle school football team.

Ohrnberger has also played for the Arizona Cardinals and San Diego Chargers.

== Early life ==
Ohrnberger was a three-year letterman and two-year captain in football at East Meadow High School in East Meadow, New York, where he also lettered in lacrosse. He was named New York AA Player-of-the-Year in 2003 and was a two-time all-conference, two-time all-county, all-metro and All-Long Island selection. He won the Thorp and Martone awards, given to Nassau County's most outstanding player and most outstanding lineman, respectively.

Ohrnberger played in both the Governor's Bowl and Empire Challenge high school all-star games.

== College career ==
Ohrnberger started every game in 2007 at left guard and was named second-team All-Big Ten.

In 2008, Ohrnberger earned third-team Associated Press All-American honors while paving the way for the NCAA's 15th-best rushing offense. He was also named first-team All-Big Ten that season, and played in the 2009 Texas vs. The Nation Game.

Ohrnberger earned a reputation as a class clown and prankster while at Penn State. Perhaps his most infamous prank involved impersonating teammate A. Q. Shipley during an October 2008, conference call interview with reporters. He performed stand-up comedy at the Hollywood Improv during team activities prior to the 2009 Rose Bowl.

== Professional career ==
Pre-draft measurables
Height	Weight
6 ft 2 1/4 in (1.89 m)	297 lb (135 kg)
All values from Pro Day

=== New England Patriots ===
Ohrnberger was drafted 123rd overall by the New England Patriots in the fourth round of the 2009 NFL draft, with a pick they ultimately obtained from trading cornerback Ellis Hobbs to the Philadelphia Eagles. He signed a four-year, $2.20 million contract on June 16, 2009. The deal included a $451,000 signing bonus. Ohrnberger was active for three games for the Patriots in 2009, seeing time at right guard with starter Stephen Neal injured and backup Dan Connolly lining up at fullback. After waking up late for a team meeting, Ohrnberger intentionally crashed his car as an excuse to Bill Belichick for arriving late.

Ohrnberger was waived by the Patriots during final cuts on September 4, 2010. He cleared waivers and was re-signed to the team's practice squad the next day. He was promoted to the 53-man roster on September 29, 2010, before the team's Week 4 game. He was active for two games in the 2010 season, both as a reserve.

In 2011, Ohrnberger was on Injured Reserve during the Patriots AFC Championship run to Super Bowl XLVI.

=== Arizona Cardinals ===
Ohrnberger signed a contract with the Arizona Cardinals on August 1, 2012.

=== San Diego Chargers ===
Ohrnberger signed with the San Diego Chargers on March 21, 2013. On September 10, 2014 Ohrnberger became a starter after the Chargers center Nick Hardwick was placed on the injured reserve.

== Personal life ==
Ohrnberger earned a reputation as a class clown and prankster while at Penn State. Perhaps his most infamous prank involved impersonating teammate A. Q. Shipley during an October 2008 conference call with reporters. In addition, he performed stand-up comedy at the Hollywood Improv during team activities prior to the 2009 Rose Bowl. Ohrnberger has a reputation for off-color humor. Ohrnberger currently hosts a sports radio show in San Diego with Mark Willard, The Mark and Rich Show on XTRA Sports 1360. This show has given birth to Dicky Fowlberger, a character created by a game on the show called The List, due to its sponsorship by Cobra Puma and Mark Willard's love of Ricky Fowler. Ohrnberger also does a sports segment in San Diego for 101.5 KGB-FM's Mornings with Sarah and Clint (formerly Mornings with Sarah, Boyer and Clint).

In 2019, Ohrnberger was a radio color commentator for San Diego Fleet games, working alongside play-by-play Jon Schaeffer.
