= Kevin Kelly (placekicker) =

American football player (born 1987)

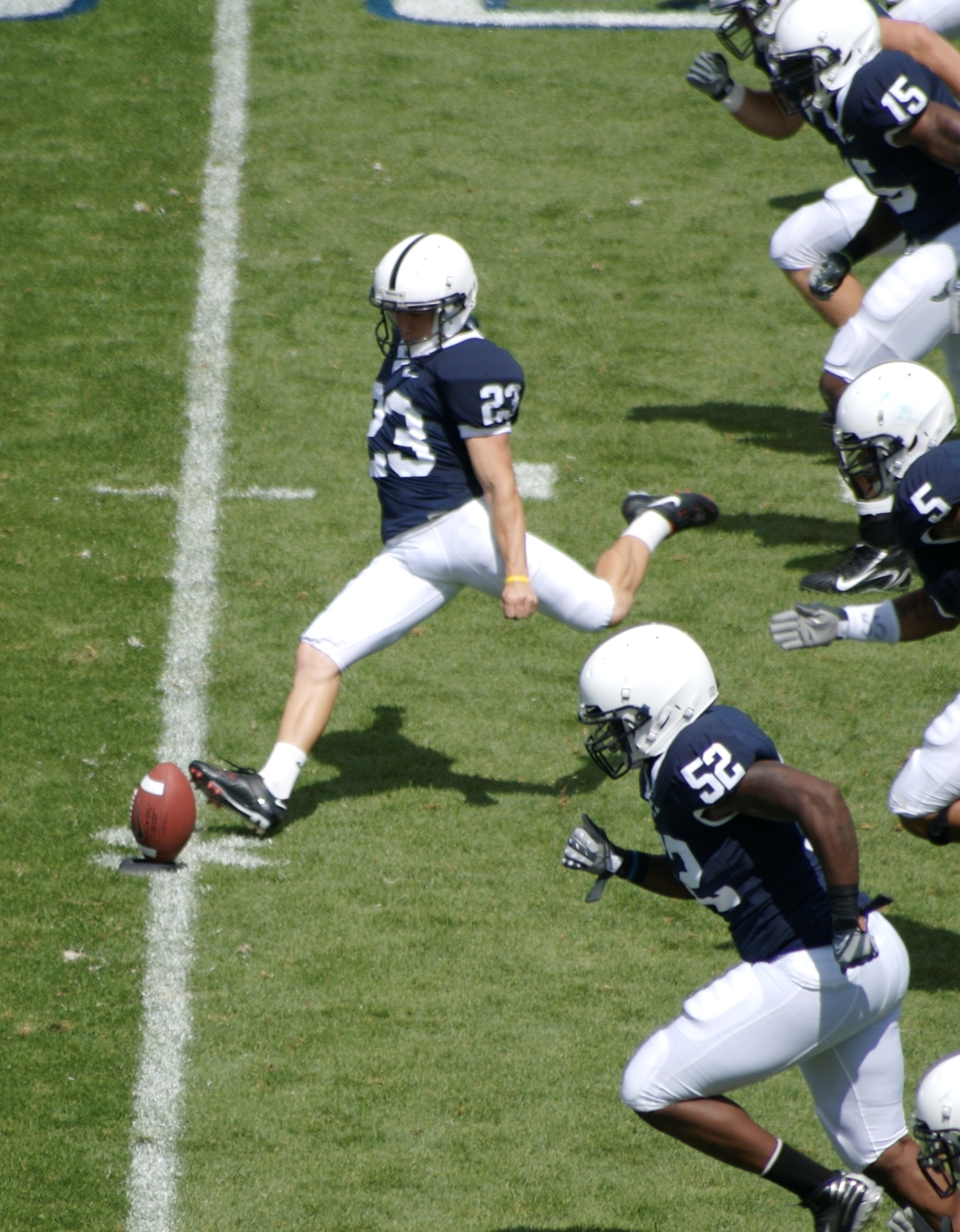

Profile
- Position: Placekicker

Personal information
- Born: August 1, 1987 (age 39); Bristol, Pennsylvania, U.S.
- Listed height: 5 ft 7 in (1.70 m)
- Listed weight: 164 lb (74 kg)

Career information
- High school: Langhorne (PA) Neshaminy
- College: Penn State
- NFL draft: 2009: undrafted

Career history
- Harrisburg Stampede (2010)

Awards and highlights
- First-team All-Big Ten (2008)

Kevin Patrick Kelly (born August 1, 1987) is an American former football placekicker. He played college football at Penn State and is second all-time in points scored for a kicker in Big Ten football history, behind Rafael Gaglianone.

== College career ==
Kevin Kelly was lightly recruited coming out of Neshaminy High School. He accepted a scholarship offer from Penn State over the Syracuse Orange and Delaware Blue Hens. Kelly claimed the starting placekicker position during pre-season training and became the first Penn State true freshman since Craig Fayak to start the season opener in their game against the South Florida Bulls. Kelly would go on to break Fayak's freshman scoring record. In the final game of the season, Kelly kicked the game-winning 29-yard field goal in the 2006 Orange Bowl against the Florida State Seminoles. He finished his freshman year with 16 field goals made on 23 attempts.

Kevin Kelly's second season at Penn State ended with him earning a place on the Academic All-Big Ten team. He made 22 of 34 field goals and was perfect on 30 extra point attempts. He kicked two career-long field goals of 49 yards, as well as two field goals against the Tennessee Volunteers in the 2007 Outback Bowl.

Kelly became Penn State's all-time leading scorer on November 10, 2007 against the Temple Owls at Lincoln Financial Field in Philadelphia. He scored his first career touchdown against Michigan State on a fake field goal, taking a direct snap from the center and running into the end zone.

Kelly began the 2008 season on the Lou Groza Award watchlist. His 17-point performance (four field goals and five PATs) in Penn State's 46–17 win versus Michigan earned him Big Ten Specialist of the Week honors and pushed his career scoring total to 376 points, making him the Big Ten's all-time kick scoring leader. He broke the previous mark of 367 points held by Minnesota's Dan Nystrom and Iowa's Nate Kaeding.

At season's end, he was named a consensus first team All-Big Ten selection and recipient of a Big Ten Distinguished Scholar Award for the 2008–09 academic year.

== Professional career ==
Pre-draft measurables
Height	Weight
5 ft 7 1/4 in (1.71 m)	165 lb (75 kg)
Values from Pro Day

Kelly joined the Harrisburg Stampede of the American Indoor Football Association in 2010. After teaching physical education for 2 years, Kelly took a sales position at the Philadelphia-based meeting and event center, The Hub.
