= 2009 Rose Bowl =

American college football game

2009 Rose Bowl presented by Citi
- 95th Rose Bowl Game
Penn State Nittany Lions	USC Trojans
(11–1)	(11–1)
Big Ten	Pac-12
24	38
Head coach: Joe Paterno	Head coach: Pete Carroll
AP / Coaches / BCS; 6 / 6 / 8	AP / Coaches / BCS; 5 / T–4 / 5
	1	2	3	4	Total
Penn State	7	0	0	17	24
USC	7	24	0	7	38
- Date: January 1, 2009
- Season: 2008
- Stadium: Rose Bowl
- Location: Pasadena, California
- MVP: Offensive: Mark Sanchez (QB, USC); Defensive: Kaluka Maiava (LB, USC)
- Favorite: USC by 9
- National anthem: Spirit of Troy
- Referee: Steve Shaw (SEC)
- Halftime show: Blue Band; Spirit of Troy
- Attendance: 93,293
- Payout: US$18 million per team

United States TV coverage
- Network: ESPN on ABC
- Announcers: Brent Musburger (play-by-play); Kirk Herbstreit (analyst); Lisa Salters (sideline); Keyshawn Johnson (guest analyst)
- Nielsen ratings: 11.7 (20.6 million viewers)

The 2009 Rose Bowl, the 95th edition of the annual game, was a college football bowl game played on Thursday, January 1, 2009 at the same-named stadium in Pasadena, California. Because of sponsorship by Citi, the first game in the 2009 edition of the Bowl Championship Series was officially titled the Rose Bowl Game presented by Citi. The contest was televised on ABC with a radio broadcast on ESPN Radio beginning at 4:30 p.m. US EST with kickoff at 5:10 p.m.. Ticket prices for all seats in the Rose Bowl were listed at $145. The Rose Bowl Game was a contractual sell-out, with 64,500 tickets allocated to the participating teams and conferences. The remaining tickets went to the Tournament of Roses members, sponsors, City of Pasadena residents, and the general public.

Scoring 24 unanswered points in the second quarter, the Pacific-10 Conference Champion University of Southern California Trojans defeated the Big Ten Conference co-champion, the Pennsylvania State University Nittany Lions, 38-24, for their third consecutive Rose Bowl victory (in their fourth consecutive appearance, having lost the 2006 BCS title game to the Texas Longhorns). The victory gave the Trojans their 24th Rose Bowl championship, the most by any team in the country. Quarterback Mark Sanchez scored five touchdowns, one rushing and four passing.

Prior to the game, the Pac-10 conference had a 4-0 record in bowl games this season with wins by Arizona, Cal, Oregon, and Oregon State. The Trojan win gave the Pac-10 a perfect five out of five games, which was the only perfect conference bowl record of the season. The Big Ten conference had last won a Rose Bowl game in the 1999 season; this streak ended when Ohio State beat Oregon in the 2010 Rose Bowl.

== Teams ==
The teams participating in the Rose Bowl Game were announced on Sunday, December 7, by the Pasadena Tournament of Roses football committee. Big Ten co-champions, Penn State, coached by Joe Paterno, were picked to play against Southern California, the champions of the Pac-10, coached by Pete Carroll. Penn State earned its bid via a head-to-head tiebreaker, beating Ohio State, 13–6 in Columbus, Ohio, on October 25, 2008. The Men of Troy earned their way in by defeating UCLA 28-7 on December 6, 2008. USC was designated as the home team, wearing dark jerseys and using the east bench on game day.

The 2009 game marked the first time since 2004 Rose Bowl that the traditional teams—the champions of the Big Ten and the Pac-10—squared off at the Rose Bowl, because at least one league champion played in the BCS Championship in each the previous four years. In the 2005 Rose Bowl, Big Ten champion Michigan met Texas, as USC played Oklahoma in the designated BCS Championship Game that year, the Orange Bowl. The following year, USC met Texas in the game, which was designated as that year's BCS National Championship contest; Big Ten champion Penn State played in the Orange Bowl against Florida State. For the 2007 and 2008 games, the runners-up of the Big Ten were sent to this game, since the champion, Ohio State, participated in the newly established separate BCS Championship Game: the Wolverines played in 2007 and Illinois would do so the following year; both teams played (and lost to) the Trojans.

Each team lost just one game during the 2008 regular season. Penn State was defeated by Iowa (24-23) and Southern California lost to Oregon State (27-21). USC and Penn State had faced two common opponents in the regular season. Both teams defeated Ohio State and Penn State beat Oregon State prior to the Beavers' defeat of the Trojans.

Penn State had appeared in the Rose Bowl twice before, losing to the Trojans 14-3 in 1923 in their only previous meeting in "The Granddaddy Of Them All", and winning in 1995 over 1994 Pac-10 champion Oregon 38-20, the latter game capped an unbeaten season in which Penn State finished #2 in both major polls. The Trojans have played in the Rose Bowl more times than any other team and made its fourth consecutive appearance in 2009. The two teams have faced each other eight times, with each team winning four games. The Kickoff Classic XVIII on August 27, 2000, in Giants Stadium at East Rutherford, New Jersey, was the last time they met: the Trojans defeated the Nittany Lions, 29-5.

== Scoring summary ==
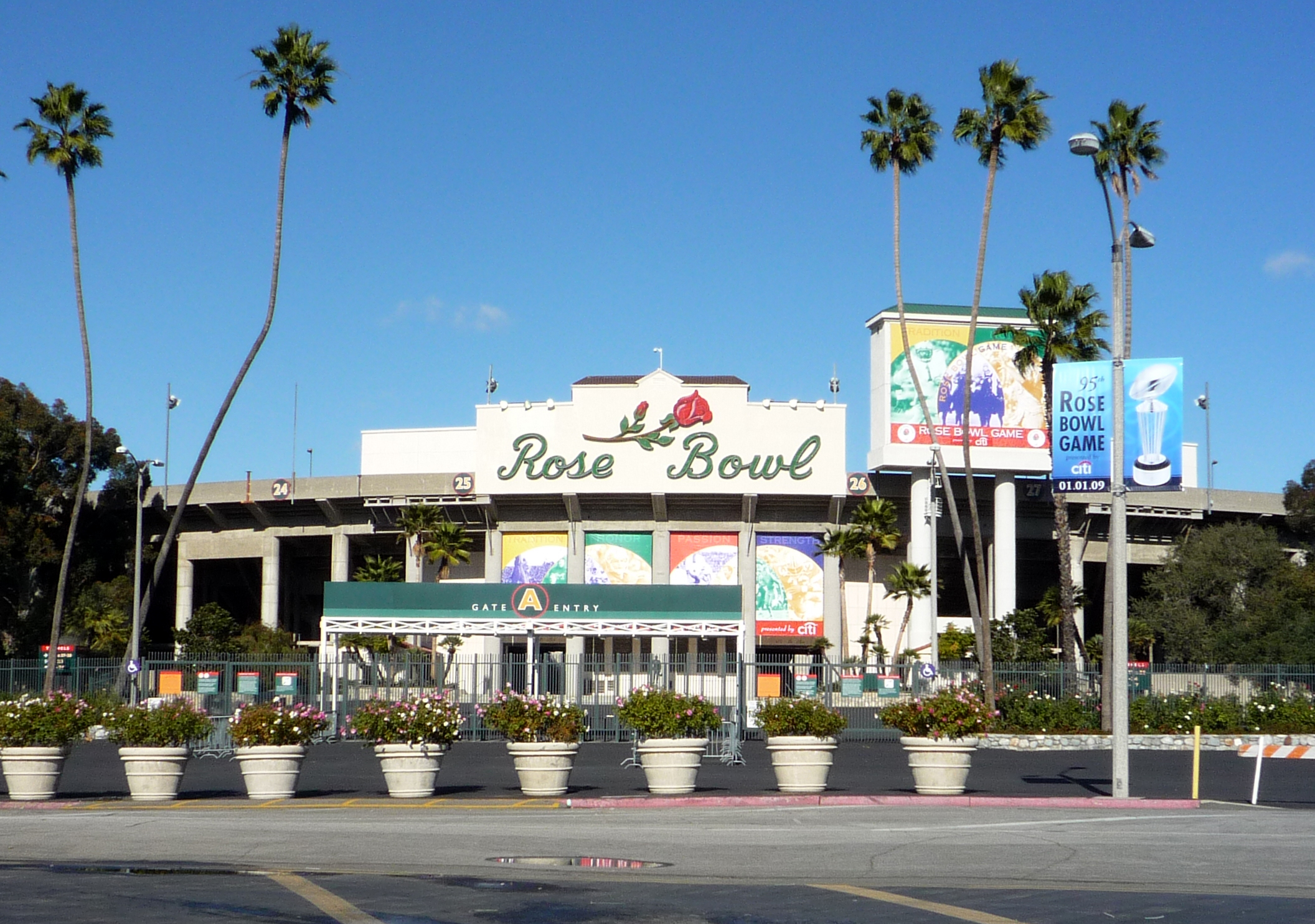
The Rose Bowl, several days before the 95th edition of the "Granddaddy of Them All".

=== First quarter ===
- USC — Williams, D. 27-yard pass from Sanchez, Mark (Buehler, David kick), PSU 0 - USC 7
- PSU — Clark, Daryll 9-yard run (Kelly, Kevin kick), PSU 7 - USC 7

=== Second quarter ===
- USC — Sanchez, Mark 6-yard run (Buehler, David kick), PSU 7 - USC 14
- USC — Buehler, David 30-yard field goal, PSU 7 - USC 17
- USC — Johnson, Ronald 19-yard pass from Sanchez, Mark (Buehler, David kick), PSU 7 - USC 24
- USC — Gable, C.J. 20-yard pass from Sanchez, Mark (Buehler, David kick), PSU 7 - USC 31

=== Third quarter ===
- No scoring

=== Fourth quarter ===
- PSU — Williams, D. 2-yard pass from Clark, Daryll (Kelly, Kevin kick), PSU 14 - USC 31
- USC — Johnson, Ronald 45-yard pass from Sanchez, Mark (Buehler, David kick), PSU 14 - USC 38
- PSU — Kelly, Kevin 25-yard field goal, PSU 17 - USC 38
- PSU — Norwood, Jordan 9-yard pass from Clark, Daryll (Kelly, Kevin kick), PSU 24 - USC 38

== Game notes ==
- Mark Sanchez became the third quarterback to pass for more than 400 yards in a Rose Bowl Game, with 413 yards. The others were Wisconsin’s Ron Vander Kelen (401 yards, 1963) and Oregon’s Danny O'Neil (456 Yards, 1995).
- Sanchez set a Rose Bowl record for completion percentage, at 80%.
- USC is the only team in history to have won three straight Rose Bowl games.
- The Lathrop K. Leishman Trophy honoring the 2009 Champion was created by Tiffany.
- Penn State was the only team in 2008 to score more than 7 points against USC in the second half.
- This marked USC head coach Pete Carroll's fifth appearance and Penn State head coach Joe Paterno's second appearance in the Rose Bowl Game.
- BCS Commissioners took "appropriate responsive actions" against Penn State for two media access contracts violations - failure to give pre-game interviews to ABC broadcasters and provide after-game locker room access. Joe Paterno explained that he did not want the attention to be taken away from Pete Carroll, knowing that the questions would focus on his health.
- This would be the last appearance for either team in the Rose Bowl until they met in a rematch in the 2017 Rose Bowl.
