= Lydell Sargeant =

American football player (born 1987)

No. 40
- Position: Cornerback

Personal information
- Born: January 31, 1987 (age 39); Vineland, New Jersey, U.S.
- Listed height: 5 ft 9 in (1.75 m)
- Listed weight: 190 lb (86 kg)

Career information
- College: Penn State
- NFL draft: 2009: undrafted

Career history
- Buffalo Bills (2009)

Awards and highlights
- Second-team All-Big Ten (2008)
- Stats at Pro Football Reference

Lydell Ryan Sargeant (born January 31, 1987) is an American former professional football player who was a cornerback in the National Football League (NFL). He played college football for the Penn State Nittany Lions and was signed by the Bills as an undrafted free agent in 2009.

== Education ==
Sargeant was a high school football recruit out of the state of California. A Pittsburgh native, Sargeant briefly attended Gateway High School in Monroeville, Pennsylvania until transferring to Cabrillo High School in Lompoc, California.

Sargeant was ranked #11 best athlete in the nation and one of the top players in the state of California. Sargeant was named All-CIF, First-team All-State running back and MVP of Los Padres League.

=== College ===
In 2005, Sargeant accepted an offer to play for Penn State over Stanford University and the University of Oregon.

Sargeant played college football at PSU as a cornerback, wide receiver, and punt returner.

In 2009, Sargeant received Second-team All-Big Ten as a cornerback for Penn State, leading the Nittany Lions in interceptions and pass breakups. Sargeant went on to train with Hall of Fame cornerback Deion Sanders in preparation for 2009 NFL draft and Combine.

Sargeant received his bachelor's degree from Pennsylvania State University in 2009. He later earned a master's degree in Sport Management Studies in 2013. Sargeant is currently pursuing a Doctorate in Education, Organizational Leadership-Organizational Development.

== Career ==
=== Buffalo Bills ===
In 2009, Sargeant was signed by the Buffalo Bills as an undrafted free agent. In 2011, Sargeant retired from the NFL following a career ending knee injury.

=== College Administration ===
Following his NFL career, Sargeant began working in College Administration and is currently working as the Senior Director of Development and Alumni Relations at the Pennsylvania State University.

In 2018, Sargeant was selected to attend the NCAA Dr. Charles Whitcomb Leadership Institute. Sargeant has received multiple National Association of Collegiate Directors of Athletics (NACDA) awards and initiatives.

=== Politics ===
In 2008, Sargeant introduced then U.S. Senator Barack Obama in front of a 22,000 assembled crowd at Penn State University for the 2008 Presidential election. Sargeant was an influential member of Penn State Students for Barack Obama and also volunteered for the U.S. President in the 2012 Presidential election.

At Penn State, Sargeant helped create and run PSU Vote, a non-partisan student voter registration organization. PSU Vote initiatives resulted in record breaking student registration and voter turnout for the 2008 Presidential Election.
