= 2007 Penn State Nittany Lions football team =

American college football season

2007 Penn State Nittany Lions football

Alamo Bowl champion

Alamo Bowl, W 24–17 vs. Texas A&M
- Conference: Big Ten Conference

Ranking
- Coaches: No. 25
- Record: 9–4 (4–4 Big Ten)
- Head coach: Joe Paterno (42nd season)
- Offensive coordinator: Galen Hall (4th season)
- Offensive scheme: Pro-style
- Defensive coordinator: Tom Bradley (8th season)
- Base defense: 4–3
- Home stadium: Beaver Stadium

2007 Big Ten Conference football standings
	Conf.			Overall
Team	W		L	W		L
No. 5 Ohio State $	7	–	1	11	–	2
No. 18 Michigan	6	–	2	9	–	4
No. 20 Illinois %	6	–	2	9	–	4
No. 24 Wisconsin	5	–	3	9	–	4
Penn State	4	–	4	9	–	4
Iowa	4	–	4	6	–	6
Purdue	3	–	5	8	–	5
Indiana	3	–	5	7	–	6
Michigan State	3	–	5	7	–	6
Northwestern	3	–	5	6	–	6
Minnesota	0	–	8	1	–	11
$ – BCS representative as conference champion; % – BCS at-large representative; Rankings from AP Poll

The 2007 Penn State Nittany Lions football team represented the Pennsylvania State University in the 2007 NCAA Division I FBS football season. The team was coached by Joe Paterno and played its home games in Beaver Stadium in University Park, Pennsylvania.

== Preseason ==
Shortly after the end of the 2006 season, junior linebacker and 2006 Bednarik Award finalist Dan Connor announced he would remain at Penn State for his senior year.

Redshirt junior offensive lineman Elijah Robinson was forced to give up football after being diagnosed with a tight spinal canal, a condition that could lead to paralysis if Robinson ever sustained a head impact that pinches the spinal cord. Redshirt junior safety Spencer Ridenhour chose to transfer from Penn State, after being unable to win a starting position with returning safety Anthony Scirrotto and converted cornerback Tony Davis ahead of him on the depth charts.

Seniors Dan Connor, Terrell Golden, and Anthony Morelli were elected tri-captains by their teammates prior to the season.

Penn State was ranked #17 in the AP and #18 in the Coaches college football preseason polls.

=== Recruiting class ===
The Nittany Lions received 21 letters of intent on National Signing Day, February 7, 2007.

College recruiting information
Name	Hometown	School	Height	Weight	40^{‡}	Commit date
Drew Astorino; DB	Edinboro, Pennsylvania	General McLane HS	5 ft 11 in (1.80 m)	175 lb (79 kg)	4.44	Jan 31, 2007
Drew Astorino; DB	Recruit ratings: Scout: Rivals: (40)					
Quinn Barham; OG	Durham, North Carolina	Hillside HS	6 ft 4 in (1.93 m)	265 lb (120 kg)	5.20	Aug 11, 2006
Quinn Barham; OG	Recruit ratings: Scout: Rivals: (74)					
Ryan Breen; P	Clarkston, Michigan	Clarkston HS	6 ft 2 in (1.88 m)	205 lb (93 kg)	4.75	Jun 24, 2006
Ryan Breen; P	Recruit ratings: Scout: Rivals: (76)					
Chris Colasanti; LB	Bloomfield, Michigan	Brother Rice HS	6 ft 2 in (1.88 m)	235 lb (107 kg)	4.60	Apr 26, 2006
Chris Colasanti; LB	Recruit ratings: Scout: Rivals: (78)					
Andrew Dailey; LB	Massillon, Ohio	Washington HS	6 ft 3 in (1.91 m)	215 lb (98 kg)	4.60	Jun 28, 2006
Andrew Dailey; LB	Recruit ratings: Scout: Rivals: (79)					
Jon Ditto; TE	Monroeville, Pennsylvania	Gateway SHS	6 ft 4 in (1.93 m)	221 lb (100 kg)	4.60	Jun 8, 2006
Jon Ditto; TE	Recruit ratings: Scout: Rivals: (79)					
Stephfon Green; CB	Bronx, New York	John F. Kennedy HS	5 ft 11 in (1.80 m)	185 lb (84 kg)	4.30	Jul 17, 2006
Stephfon Green; CB	Recruit ratings: Scout: Rivals: (40)					
Kevion Latham; DE	Greensboro, North Carolina	Page HS	6 ft 3 in (1.91 m)	240 lb (110 kg)	4.60	Jul 12, 2006
Kevion Latham; DE	Recruit ratings: Scout: Rivals: (77)					
Josh Marks; OT	Catawissa, Pennsylvania	Southern Columbia Area HS	6 ft 4 in (1.93 m)	285 lb (129 kg)	5.30	May 19, 2006
Josh Marks; OT	Recruit ratings: Scout: Rivals: (79)					
Nerraw McCormack; OT	Bronx, New York	John F Kennedy HS	6 ft 5 in (1.96 m)	290 lb (130 kg)	5.15	Jan 4, 2007
Nerraw McCormack; OT	Recruit ratings: Scout: Rivals: (NA)					
Derek Moye; WR	Rochester, Pennsylvania	Rochester Area HS	6 ft 5 in (1.96 m)	178 lb (81 kg)	4.65	Jan 25, 2007
Derek Moye; WR	Recruit ratings: Scout: Rivals: (40)					
Chimaeze Okoli; DT	Virginia Beach, Virginia	Salem HS	6 ft 5 in (1.96 m)	275 lb (125 kg)	5.00	Feb 2, 2007
Chimaeze Okoli; DT	Recruit ratings: Scout: Rivals: (40)					
Ako Poti; OT	San Francisco, California	CC of San Francisco	6 ft 5 in (1.96 m)	300 lb (140 kg)	NA	Dec 15, 2006
Ako Poti; OT	Recruit ratings: Scout: Rivals: (NA)					
Chaz Powell; CB	Glen Rock, Pennsylvania	Susquehannock HS	6 ft 2 in (1.88 m)	185 lb (84 kg)	4.44	Jun 24, 2006
Chaz Powell; CB	Recruit ratings: Scout: Rivals: (74)					
Devon Still; DT	Wilmington, Delaware	Howard HS of Technology	6 ft 5 in (1.96 m)	250 lb (110 kg)	4.90	Jan 24, 2007
Devon Still; DT	Recruit ratings: Scout: Rivals: (79)					
Nathan Stupar; LB	State College, Pennsylvania	State College Area HS	6 ft 2 in (1.88 m)	220 lb (100 kg)	4.61	May 24, 2006
Nathan Stupar; LB	Recruit ratings: Scout: Rivals: (79)					
Joe Suhey; S	Wilmette, Illinois	Loyola Academy	6 ft 2 in (1.88 m)	190 lb (86 kg)	4.60	Dec 12, 2006
Joe Suhey; S	Recruit ratings: Scout: Rivals: (40)					
Nick Sukay; S	Greensburg, Pennsylvania	Greensburg Central Catholic HS	6 ft 3 in (1.91 m)	205 lb (93 kg)	4.49	Jun 26, 2006
Nick Sukay; S	Recruit ratings: Scout: Rivals: (79)					
Andrew Szczerba; TE	Wilmington, Delaware	Salesianum School	6 ft 6 in (1.98 m)	250 lb (110 kg)	4.90	Aug 13, 2006
Andrew Szczerba; TE	Recruit ratings: Scout: Rivals: (40)					
J.B. Walton; OG	New Berlin, New York	Milford Academy	6 ft 3 in (1.91 m)	275 lb (125 kg)	4.90	Jan 17, 2006
J.B. Walton; OG	Recruit ratings: Scout: Rivals: (86)					
Stefen Wisniewski; OG	Pittsburgh, Pennsylvania	Central Catholic HS	6 ft 3.5 in (1.92 m)	275 lb (125 kg)	5.10	Dec 2, 2006
Stefen Wisniewski; OG	Recruit ratings: Scout: Rivals: (79)					
Overall recruit ranking: Scout: 18 Rivals: 23
‡ Refers to 40-yard dash; Note: In many cases, Scout, Rivals, 247Sports, On3, and ESPN may conflict in their listings of height, weight and 40 time.; In these cases, the average was taken. ESPN grades are on a 100-point scale.; Sources: "Penn State Commit List for 2007". Rivals.; "Scout.com Football Recruiting: Penn State". Scout.; "RecruitTracker 2007: Penn State". ESPN.; "Scout.com Team Recruiting Rankings". Scout.; "2007 Team Ranking". Rivals.com.

=== Spring practice ===
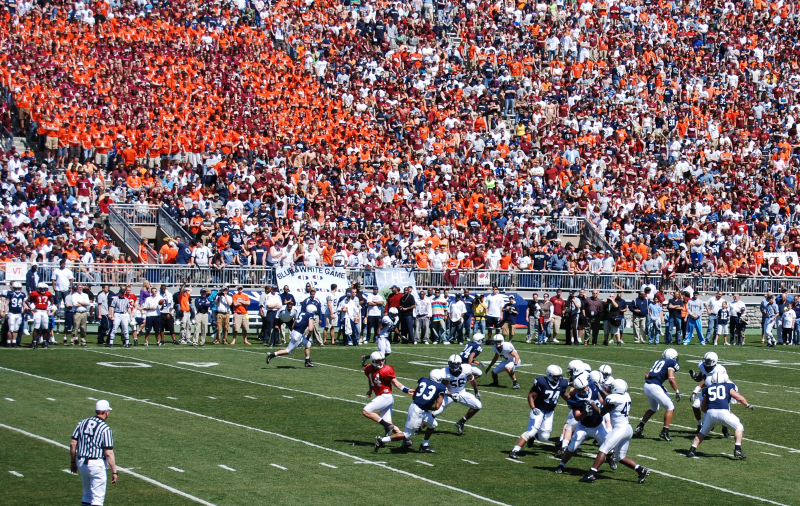
Blue-White game with the VT block in the background

The public got their first look at the 2007 squad during the annual Blue-White Game at Beaver Stadium on April 21, a 70-degree sun-splashed day. A record crowd of 71,000 turned out for the scrimmage, the third highest in the nation for a spring football game, and surpassing the previous record of 62,000 set in 1996.

Thousands of fans in the huge crowd wore maroon and orange shirts, in tribute to the victims of the previous week's events at Virginia Tech, including a section of 800 fans that formed a large "VT" block.

The White team defeated the Blue team 30–6, led by junior quarterback Paul Cianciolo who ran for one touchdown and passed for two more, finishing 8-of-9 for 126 yards passing, and sophomore receiver Chris Bell who led all receivers with 116 yards receiving and two touchdowns, including a 74-yard touchdown reception from quarterback Daryll Clark.

=== Criminal charges ===
On April 27, 2007, State College police announced that six members of the squad were charged with a range of criminal charges related to an altercation that occurred in an apartment in downtown State College earlier that month. The charges include burglary, criminal trespass, simple assault, and harassment, and players charged include junior safety Anthony Scirrotto, who led the Big Ten in 2006 with six interceptions and was named 2006 first-team All-Big Ten, and junior cornerback Justin King, named second-team All-Big Ten in 2006. Charges against King were withdrawn before the preliminary hearing on May 4, 2007. After the hearing, charges against Jerome Hayes, Tyrell Sales and Lydell Sargeant were dismissed, citing weak evidence. However, Scirrotto and Chris Baker still face a possible trial in county court.

Coach Paterno announced that, because of the incident, the entire football team will clean Beaver Stadium on Sundays after home games, a task usually handled by members of Penn State's club sports teams. The team began serving this punishment following their 59–0 victory over Florida International. The players arrived at the stadium just prior to 8:00 a.m. and cleaned eight sections of the stadium. They were joined by members of various sports clubs and teams. The football team and other organizations worked together to clean the entire stadium.

Penn State's Office of Judicial Affairs expelled Scirrotto, Baker, Sargeant and Hayes for the second summer semester, but all four players were allowed to return to campus on August 6 for preseason workouts. Sargeant and his family requested formal Judicial Affairs hearings to appeal the decision.

Charges of burglary, simple assault and criminal solicitation against Scirrotto were subsequently dismissed by Centre County Presiding Judge, Charles C. Brown, Jr., but a felony charge of criminal trespass and a summary offense of harassment are still pending. Trials for Scirrotto and Baker are scheduled for December.

=== Preseason awards ===
- Jeremy Boone
  Arthur Ashe Jr. Sports Scholars Award
- Deon Butler
  Second-team Athlon Sports pre-season All-Big Ten
  Second-team Sporting News pre-season All-Big Ten
  Second-team College Football News pre-season All-Big Ten
- Gerald Cadogan
  Arthur Ashe Jr. Sports Scholars Award
- Dan Connor
  First-team Athlon Sports pre-season All-American
  First-team Athlon Sports pre-season All-Big Ten
  Second-team Sporting News pre-season All-American
  First-team Sporting News pre-season All-Big Ten
  Second-team CBS Sports pre-season All-American
  College Football News pre-season Defensive Player of the Year
  First-team College Football News pre-season All-Big Ten
- Devin Fentress
  Arthur Ashe Jr. Sports Scholars Award
- Kevin Kelly
  Third-team Athlon Sports pre-season All-Big Ten
- Justin King
  Second-team Athlon Sports pre-season All-Big Ten
  Second-team Sporting News pre-season All-Big Ten
  First-team College Football News pre-season All-Big Ten
- Sean Lee
  Third-team Athlon Sports pre-season All-Big Ten
  Second-team Sporting News pre-season All-Big Ten
  Second-team College Football News pre-season All-Big Ten
- Anthony Morelli
  Second-team Athlon Sports pre-season All-Big Ten
- Rich Ohrnberger
  Second-team Athlon Sports pre-season All-Big Ten
- Andrew Quarless
  Second-team Athlon Sports pre-season All-Big Ten
- Anthony Scirrotto
  First-team Sporting News pre-season All-Big Ten
  Second-team College Football News pre-season All-Big Ten
- A.J. Wallace
  Third-team Athlon Sports pre-season All-Big Ten
- Derrick Williams
  Second-team Athlon Sports pre-season All-Big Ten
  Second-team Sporting News pre-season All-Big Ten
  Second-team College Football News pre-season All-American
  First-team College Football News pre-season All-Big Ten

== Schedule ==
Date	Time	Opponent	Rank	Site	TV	Result	Attendance
September 1	12:00 p.m.	Florida International*	No. 17	Beaver Stadium; University Park, PA	BTN	W 59–0	107,678
September 8	6:00 p.m.	Notre Dame*	No. 14	Beaver Stadium; University Park, PA (rivalry)	ESPN	W 31–10	110,078
September 15	12:00 p.m.	Buffalo*	No. 12	Beaver Stadium; University Park, PA	BTN	W 45–24	107,506
September 22	3:30 p.m.	at Michigan	No. 10	Michigan Stadium; Ann Arbor, MI (rivalry)	ABC	L 9–14	111,310
September 29	12:00 p.m.	at Illinois	No. 21	Memorial Stadium; Champaign, IL	BTN	L 20–27	57,078
October 6	3:30 p.m.	Iowa		Beaver Stadium; University Park, PA	ABC	W 27–7	108,951
October 13	3:30 p.m.	No. 19 Wisconsin^{†}		Beaver Stadium; University Park, PA	ABC	W 38–7	109,574
October 20	12:00 p.m.	at Indiana		Memorial Stadium; Bloomington, IN	ESPN	W 36–31	41,251
October 27	8:00 p.m.	No. 1 Ohio State	No. 24	Beaver Stadium; University Park, PA (rivalry, College GameDay)	ABC	L 17–37	110,134
November 3	12:00 p.m.	Purdue		Beaver Stadium; University Park, PA	ESPN	W 26–19	108,318
November 10	12:00 p.m.	at Temple*		Lincoln Financial Field; Philadelphia, PA	ESPNU	W 31–0	69,029
November 17	3:30 p.m.	at Michigan State		Spartan Stadium; East Lansing, MI (rivalry)	ABC	L 31–35	72,251
December 29	8:00 p.m.	vs. Texas A&M*		Alamodome; San Antonio, TX (Alamo Bowl)	ESPN	W 24–17	66,166
*Non-conference game; ^{†}Homecoming; Rankings from AP Poll released prior to the game; All times are in Eastern time

== Personnel ==
=== Roster ===
2007 Penn State Nittany Lions football team roster
Players
Coaches
Offense

Pos.	#	Name	Class
WR	2	Derrick Williams	Jr
WR	3	Deon Butler	Jr
WR	4	Terrell Golden (C)	Sr
WR	5	Graham Zug	Fr
WR	6	Derek Moye	Fr
QB	7	Pat Devlin	Fr
WR	8	James McDonald	So
WR	9	Kevin Cousins	So
TE	10	Andrew Quarless	So
QB	13	Kevin Suhey	So
QB	14	Anthony Morelli (C)	Sr
QB	15	Paul Cianciolo	Jr
TE	16	Francis Claude	So
QB	17	Daryll Clark	Jr
WR	18	Patrick Mauti	So
WR	19	Chris Bell	So
RB	20	Rodney Kinlaw	Sr
WR	22	Tyler Ahrenhold	Fr
RB	22	Evan Royster	Fr
WR	24	Jordan Norwood	Jr
RB	25	Stephfon Green	Fr
RB	32	Brent Carter	Fr
RB	33	Austin Scott	Sr
RB	34	Matt Hahn	Sr
WR	35	Jesse Alfreno	Fr
RB	37	Joe Suhey	Fr
FB	38	Dan Lawlor	Jr
RB	39	Nick Pinchek	Sr
FB	44	Larry Federoff	So
G	50	Mike Lucian	Jr
OT	56	Austin Hinton	Jr
C	57	A.Q. Shipley	Jr
C	60	Patick Weber	Sr
OL	61	Stefen Wisniewski	Fr
G	62	Ross Muir	Jr
OT	63	Joe Toriello	Jr
G	64	Rich Ohrnberger	Jr
G	65	J.B. Walton	Fr
OL	66	Josh Marks	Fr
OL	67	Quinn Barham	Fr
C	68	Doug Klopacz	Fr
OT	72	Kyle Stout	Fr
OT	73	Dennis Landolt	So
OT	74	Johnnie Troutman	Fr
OT	75	Nerraw McCormack	Jr
OT	76	Gerald Cadogan	Jr
G	77	Lou Eliades	Fr
OT	78	John Shaw	Sr
OT	79	Ako Poti	Jr
TE	80	Andrew Szczerba	Fr
TE	81	Brennan Coakley	So
TE	82	Mickey Shuler	So
WR	83	Brett Brackett	Fr
WR	84	Ben Woodward	Fr
WR	86	Mark Wedderburn	Fr
TE	87	Greg Miskinis	Jr
TE	88	Jon Ditto	Fr
TE	89	Jordan Lyons	Jr

Defense

Pos.	#	Name	Class
CB	1	Justin King	Jr
LB	5	Jerome Hayes	So
CB	6	Willie Harriott	So
S	7	Anthony Scirrotto	Jr
S	9	Mark Rubin	Jr
CB	10	Lydell Sargeant	Jr
S	11	Tony Davis	Jr
CB	12	A.J. Wallace	So
LB	13	Andrew Dailey	Fr
LB	15	Bani Gbadyu	Fr
DB	16	Shelton McCullough	Fr
LB	18	Navorro Bowman	Fr
CB	20	Devin Fentress	So
CB	21	Knowledge Timmons	So
CB	25	Brendan Perretta	Sr
S	26	Nick Sukay	Fr
DB	27	Chaz Powell	Fr
DB	28	Drew Astorina	Fr
S	29	Cedric Jeffries	Fr
LB	30	Josh Matzkin	Fr
LB	34	Nathan Stupar	Fr
LB	40	Dan Connor (C)	Sr
S	42	Jason Ganter	Sr
LB	43	Josh Hull	So
DL	44	Kevion Latham	Fr
LB	45	Sean Lee	So
LB	46	Tyrell Sales	Jr
DE	47	Josh Gaines	Jr
DE	48	Maurice Evans	So
LB	51	Shaine Thompson	Fr
LB	52	Dontey Brown	Jr
LB	53	Chris Colasanti	Fr
DT	54	Jed Hill	Jr
DT	55	Tom McEowen	Fr
DE	56	Eric Latimore	Fr
LB	57	Chris Mauriello	Sr
DE	59	Aaron Maybin	Fr
DL	71	Devon Still	Fr
DT	85	Ollie Ogbu	Fr
DE	87	Chris Rogers	Jr
DT	90	Phillip Taylor	So
DT	91	Jared Odrick	So
DT	93	Chris Baker	So
DE	94	Tom Golarz	So
DT	97	Abe Koroma	Fr
DT	99	Chimaeze Okoli	Fr

Special teams

Pos.	#	Name	Class
K	23	Kevin Kelly	Jr
K	36	Collin Wagner	Fr
P	41	Jeremy Boone	So
P	49	Ryan Breen	Fr
K	96	Joe Hughes	Jr

Head coach

- Joe Paterno

Coordinators/assistant coaches

Legend

- (C) Team captain
- (S) Suspended
- (I) Ineligible
- Injured
- Redshirt

Roster
Last update: August 24, 2007

=== Coaching staff ===
- Joe Paterno – Head Coach
- Dick Anderson – Offensive Line (Guards and Centers)
- Tom Bradley – Defensive Coordinator and Cornerbacks
- Galen Hall – Offensive Coordinator and Running Backs
- Larry Johnson, Sr. – Defensive Line
- Bill Kenney – Offensive Tackles and Tight Ends
- Mike McQueary – Wide Receivers and Recruiting Coordinator
- Brian Norwood – Safeties
- Jay Paterno – Quarterbacks
- Ron Vanderlinden – Linebackers
- John Thomas – Strength and Conditioning

=== Coaching changes ===
Safeties coach Brian Norwood left the staff at the conclusion of the regular season to accept the defensive coordinator position at Baylor. Former Coordinator of Player Personnel Kermit Buggs was named his replacement and assumed coaching duties prior to the Nittany Lions' postseason appearance in the Alamo Bowl.

== Game summaries ==
=== September 1: Florida International ===
	1	2	3	4	Total
FIU	0	0	0	0	0
Penn State	14	10	28	7	59

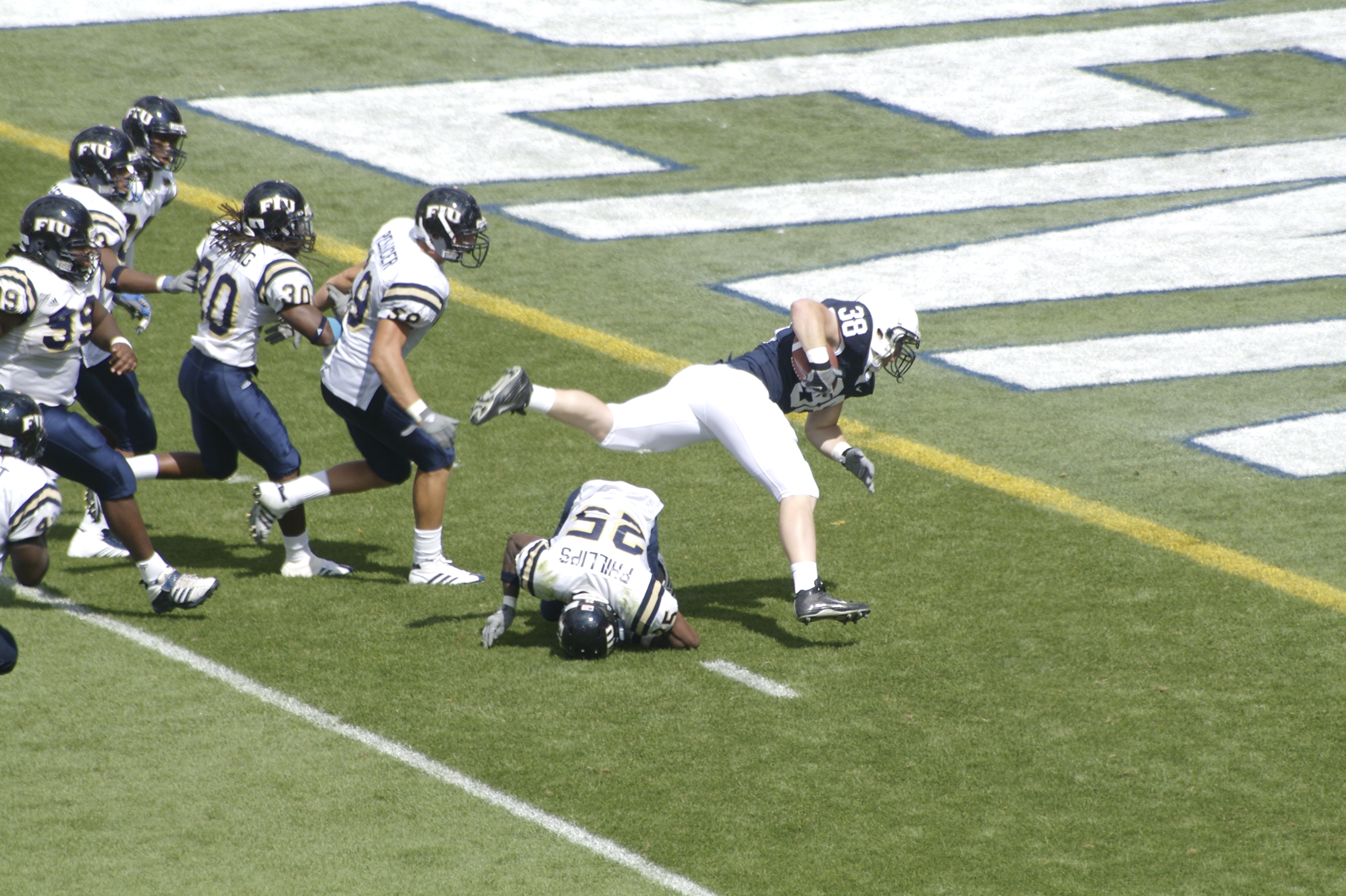
Penn State fullback Dan Lawlor hurdles a defender to score a touchdown in the 2007 season opener.

The Nittany Lions shut out the Golden Panthers in their first-ever meeting. Quarterback Anthony Morelli was 23 of 38 for 295 yards, with touchdown passes to Terrell Golden, Mickey Shuler, Jr., and Matt Hahn. The running backs scored five touchdowns, including two by Austin Scott.

Led by linebackers Dan Connor and Sean Lee, the defensive unit forced five turnovers and held FIU to −3 yards rushing.

Lee was named Big Ten Defensive Player of the Week for his performance.

=== September 8: Notre Dame ===
	1	2	3	4	Total
Notre Dame	7	0	3	0	10
Penn State	7	7	10	7	31

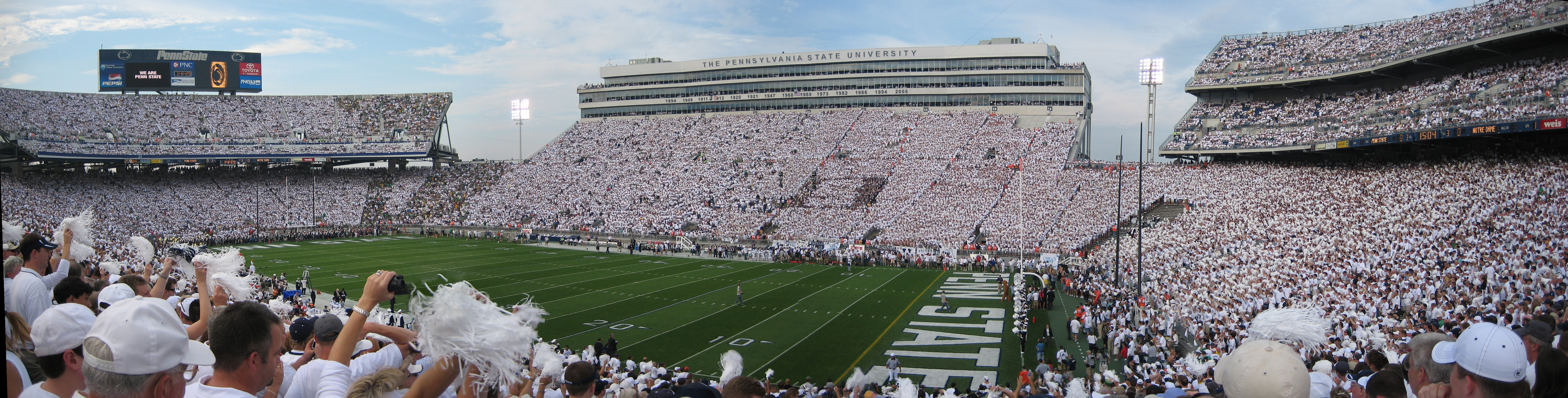
The first stadium-wide White-Out for the Notre Dame game

In front of a crowd of 110,078 spectators, the second-largest ever at Beaver Stadium, the Nittany Lions overpowered an inexperienced Fighting Irish team in a 31–10 win. Derrick Williams returned a punt 78 yards for a touchdown to start Penn State's scoring, after the Irish took a 7–0 lead on an interception return for a touchdown. Austin Scott rushed for 116 yards and two touchdowns on 28 carries. Anthony Morelli finished 12 of 21 for 131 yards, including a 51-yard strike to Chris Bell and a 10-yard touchdown to Jordan Norwood.

Led by Dan Connor, the defense sacked the Irish's highly touted freshman quarterback Jimmy Clausen six times for −50 yards. The defensive unit held the Irish to zero rushing yards and just 144 yards total. The Irish committed 14 penalties for 97 yards, partly due to the loud, mostly white-clad crowd.

Recording 12 tackles, Connor was selected Big Ten Defensive Player of the Week as well as Walter Camp National Defensive Player of the Week. Derrick Williams' punt return for a touchdown was selected the week's Pontiac Game Changing Performance in a landslide vote.

=== September 15: Buffalo ===
	1	2	3	4	Total
Buffalo	3	0	0	21	24
Penn State	0	17	14	14	45

Backup tailback Rodney Kinlaw had his first 100-yard game, tallying a career-high 129 yards on 23 carries and a touchdown after replacing starter Austin Scott, who fumbled on each of Penn State's first two drives. Scott's first fumble at the Penn State 8-yard line allowed the Bulls to take the lead, 3–0.

After a slow start, quarterback Anthony Morelli finished 20 of 27 for 202 yards and a career-high four touchdowns, including two to tight end Andrew Quarless, who was playing in his first game this season after being suspended for an underage drinking citation. Jordan Norwood's acrobatic 5-yard touchdown catch was highlighted as the Top Play for September 15, 2007 on ESPN's SportsCenter.

On defense, Dan Connor and Sean Lee each recorded 12 tackles. Safety Anthony Scirrotto also recorded an interception and recovered a fumble forced by Tony Davis.

=== September 22: @ Michigan ===
	1	2	3	4	Total
Penn State	0	3	3	3	9
Michigan	7	0	0	7	14

The Wolverines defeated the Nittany Lions 14–9, their first loss of the season. Michigan's Mike Hart carried the ball a record 44 times for 153 yards, helping the Wolverines control the clock and executed 26 more plays than Penn State.

The Nittany Lions defense permitted only three drives above 40 yards, forced two turnovers and limited Hart to 3.5 yards per carry, but the Wolverines were 10 of 18 on third down conversions. Sean Lee finished with 12 tackles, and cornerback Lydell Sargeant made a career-high 10 tackles including a tackle for loss and an interception.

Anthony Morelli was 15 of 31 for 169 yards, with no touchdowns or interceptions, but lost a fumble early in the game on the Penn State 10-yard line. Michigan needed only two plays to convert the turnover into a touchdown.

=== September 29: @ Illinois ===
	1	2	3	4	Total
Penn State	10	7	3	0	20
Illinois	14	7	3	3	27

The Nittany Lions fell 27–20 to the Fighting Illini in a turnover-filled game, Illinois's first win over a ranked opponent since 2001. The Illini would take a 7–3 lead on a 90-yard kickoff return for a touchdown, the first given up by Penn State since 1994.

Quarterback Anthony Morelli was 21 of 38 for a career-high 298 yards but was intercepted three times inside the Illinois 30-yard line. Morelli also had a crucial fumble on a fourth down scramble after appearing to have gained enough yards for the first down. The offense started five drives in Illinois territory but could only score three points on those drives.

The defense struggled early to defend the Illini's option running game, giving up 216 yards rushing. Linebacker Sean Lee recorded a career-high 17 tackles. Justin King and Tony Davis each intercepted the ball once, the second of the season for both players.

=== October 6: Iowa ===
	1	2	3	4	Total
Iowa	0	0	0	7	7
Penn State	0	13	7	7	27

Quarterback Anthony Morelli overcame first-half boos from the Beaver Stadium crowd to finish 18 of 31 for 233 yards and a touchdown in a 27–7 win over the Hawkeyes. Rodney Kinlaw, playing in place of suspended tailback Austin Scott, ran for a career-high 168 yards and two touchdowns. Redshirt freshman Evan Royster had 86 yards on 16 carries before leaving the game in the third quarter with an injury.

Placekicker Kevin Kelly connected on 2 of 3 field goals, including a personal-best 53-yarder. Deon Butler led Nittany Lions receivers with 3 catches for 55 yards. Maurice Evans and Aaron Maybin each sacked Iowa's Jake Christensen twice, and the Hawkeyes were held scoreless until Trey Stross caught an 11-yard touchdown pass early in the fourth quarter.

=== October 13: Wisconsin ===
	1	2	3	4	Total
Wisconsin	7	0	0	0	7
Penn State	10	14	7	7	38

Penn State capitalized on early turnovers by the Badgers, including a P.J. Hill fumble on the first play from scrimmage, to take control of the game early.

Quarterback Anthony Morelli completed 16 of 28 passes for 216 yards and a touchdown for the Nittany Lions. Tailbacks Rodney Kinlaw and Evan Royster each scored touchdowns while rushing for 115 and 68, respectively. Wide receiver Deon Butler caught seven passes for 93 yards and a touchdown. Backup quarterback Daryll Clark, who saw playing time in mop-up duty, scored on a 1-yard run. The Penn State defense intercepted Badgers quarterback Tyler Donovan twice. Linebackers Sean Lee and Dan Connor each ended with 12 tackles. The Lions were only penalized once for 10 yards, continuing their streak as the Big Ten's least-penalized team.

Defensive end Jerome Hayes was lost for the season after tearing his ACL in the third quarter.

=== October 20: @ Indiana ===
	1	2	3	4	Total
Penn State	0	20	3	13	36
Indiana	7	7	3	14	31

The Penn State defense, despite giving up 386 total yards, forced four second-half Hoosiers turnovers, including two forced fumbles by defensive end Maurice Evans who scooped up one fumble and returned it 55 yards. Although the Hoosiers had the lead early on, the Nittany Lions took the lead in the final minute of the first half. Penn State held off an Indiana comeback in the fourth quarter, ensuring the continuation of their perfect record over the Hoosiers. The win also gave the Nittany Lions their first road win of the year.

On offense, Anthony Morelli finished 22 of 32 for 195 yards, two touchdowns and an interception. Jordan Norwood led all receivers with 8 receptions for 65 yards.

Evans was named Big Ten Defensive Player of the Week. In addition to his two forced fumbles, he also recorded 4.5 tackles for loss and 3.5 sacks.

Defensive tackle Jared Odrick left the game with a broken ankle, and fullback Matt Hahn left with a torn ACL. Both are out for the season.

=== October 27: Ohio State ===
	1	2	3	4	Total
Ohio State	10	7	7	13	37
Penn State	7	0	3	7	17

ESPN's College GameDay aired from State College, the second time in three seasons the show originated from Happy Valley for the visit by the Buckeyes. After a close first quarter, Ohio State pulled away to win 37–17. First Ohio State scored a field goal, then Penn State scored a touchdown. Ohio State then scored another touchdown to end the quarter 10–7. After another Ohio State touchdown to put the Buckeyes up 17-7, Penn State linebacker Dan Connor intercepted a Todd Boeckman pass, Ohio State's only meaningful possession to not end in a score, to give the Nittany Lions a chance to close the gap before halftime. However, Penn State ended up punting, and the Buckeyes dominated the second half, allowing only a field goal and a late kickoff return touchdown. Ohio State never punted in the game.

=== November 3: Purdue ===
	1	2	3	4	Total
Purdue	10	0	6	3	19
Penn State	3	10	0	13	26

In his final Beaver Stadium performance, linebacker Dan Connor made 11 tackles against the Boilermakers to give him 379 career stops and became Penn State's all-time tackler, passing Paul Posluszny (372).

Senior Anthony Morelli was 22 of 35 for 210 yards and a touchdown, giving him 2,060 yards passing for the season. With 2,424 passing yards last season, Morelli became the first Nittany Lion quarterback with at least 2,000 passing yards in multiple seasons.

Redshirt freshman tailback Evan Royster recorded his first career 100-yard rushing game, finishing with 126 yards on 21 carries and a touchdown. Derrick Williams also made a career-high 10 receptions for 95 yards and rushed for 12 yards and a touchdown, finishing with a career-high 151 all-purpose yards.

Linebacker Sean Lee was named Big Ten Co-Defensive Player of the Week. Lee finished with 12 tackles and two forced fumbles, including a game-changing play late in the first quarter. On third-and-goal from the one yard line, Lee stripped and recovered the football to halt a potential Purdue scoring drive.

=== November 10: @ Temple ===
	1	2	3	4	Total
Penn State	14	3	0	14	31
Temple	0	0	0	0	0

Senior tailback Rodney Kinlaw eclipsed the 1,000 yard mark as the Nittany Lions shut out the Owls for the second consecutive year. Kinlaw tied his career-high 168 yards and also caught a career-high five passes for 27 yards.

Anthony Morelli was 22 of 33 for 260 yards with three touchdowns, two of them to Jordan Norwood. Derrick Williams had a game-high seven receptions for a career-high 104 yards, and teammate Deon Butler made five receptions for 43 yards and a touchdown.

The Nittany Lions defense posted its fourth shut-out in 17 games, and its second road shutout in 17 games, dating back to the 12–0 win over Purdue in Ross–Ade Stadium in 2006. The defense was led by Dan Connor who tied his career-high of 18 tackles and Sean Lee who had 10 tackles and a fumble recovery.

For the second time this season, Connor was selected the Walter Camp National Defensive Player of the Week as well as Big Ten Defensive Player of the Week.

=== November 17: @ Michigan State ===
	1	2	3	4	Total
Penn State	7	10	7	7	31
Michigan State	7	0	14	14	35

The Nittany Lions took a 24–7 lead in the third quarter on kicker Kevin Kelly's 5-yard touchdown run on a fake field goal. However, the Spartans outscored Penn State 28–7 the remainder of the game to take possession of the Land Grant Trophy. Penn State was awarded a 4th timeout in the final minute of the game.

The Nittany Lions defense forced three turnovers and limited the Spartans to 145 rushing yards, but Spartans quarterback Brian Hoyer was 16 of 21 for 257 yards, with four touchdowns and two interceptions. The Spartans had eight pass plays of 20 yards or more, with seven coming in the second half.

Anthony Morelli was 16 of 35 for 188 yards, with one touchdown and no interceptions. However, down 35–31 in the game's final minutes, Morelli threw four consecutive incompletions to end Penn State's last drive.

=== December 29: 2007 Alamo Bowl – Texas A&M ===
	1	2	3	4	Total
Penn State	0	17	7	0	24
Texas A&M	14	0	3	0	17

Penn State rallied from a 14–0 first quarter deficit to win 24–17 on the strength of the running game provided by the offensive line and Rodney Kinlaw, Daryll Clark and Evan Royster. The defense came up with a key goal line stand in the fourth quarter stopping an option play on fourth and goal from inside the five yard line. The comeback from 14–0 has been compared to the 1981 Penn State vs Pittsburgh game where Penn State fell into an early 14–0 hole after one, but came back to win in a 48–14 blowout. In this game, Penn State went on a 24–3 run in the second and third quarters.

== Rankings ==
Ranking movements Legend: ██ Increase in ranking ██ Decrease in ranking — = Not ranked
	Week															
Poll	Pre	1	2	3	4	5	6	7	8	9	10	11	12	13	14	Final
AP	17	14	12	10	21	—	—	24	—	—	—	—	—	—	—	—
Coaches	18	15	12	10	19	—	—	25	22	—	25	22	—	—	—	25
Harris	Not released				19	—	—	—	22	—	—	25	—	—	—	Not released
BCS	Not released							—	25	—	23	—	—	—	—	Not released

== Awards ==
=== Watchlists ===
- Deon Butler
  Fred Biletnikoff Award watchlist
  Maxwell Award watchlist
- Dan Connor
  Lombardi Award watchlist and semifinalist
  Chuck Bednarik Award watchlist, semifinalist, and finalist
  Dick Butkus Award watchlist, semifinalist and finalist
  Bronko Nagurski Trophy watchlist
  Lott Trophy watchlist
  Walter Camp Player of the Year semifinalist
- Maurice Evans
  Ted Hendricks Award finalist
- Justin King
  Jim Thorpe Award watchlist
- Anthony Morelli
  Davey O'Brien Award watchlist
  Manning Award watchlist
- Andrew Quarless
  John Mackey Award watchlist
- A. Q. Shipley
  Dave Rimington Trophy watchlist
- Derrick Williams
  Fred Biletnikoff Award watchlist

=== Players ===
- Jeremy Boone
  First-team All-Big Ten
  ESPN All-Big Ten Team
- Gerald Cadogan
  ESPN The Magazine CoSIDA Academic All-District
  First-team ESPN The Magazine CoSIDA Academic All-American
- Dan Connor
  2007 Bednarik Award winner
  First-team Walter Camp All-American
  First-team Associated Press All-American
  First-team ESPN All-American
  Second-team Sporting News All-American
  First-team Rivals.com All-American
  College Football News All-American
  First-team Scout.com All-American
  Walter Camp Defensive Player of the Week (September 8)
  Big Ten Defensive Player of the Week (September 8)
  Walter Camp Defensive Player of the Week (November 10)
  Big Ten Defensive Player of the Week (November 10)
  First-team All-Big Ten
  ESPN All-Big Ten Team
  Second-team Sports Illustrated mid-season All American
  Under Armour Award (Most Valuable Player, 2008 Senior Bowl North team)
- Maurice Evans
  Third-team Scout.com All-American
  Big Ten Defensive Player of the Week (October 20)
  First-team All-Big Ten
- Justin King
  First-team All-Big Ten
- Sean Lee
  First-team Pro Football Weekly All-American
  Big Ten Defensive Player of the Week (September 1)
  Big Ten Defensive Player of the Week (November 3)
  ESPN The Magazine CoSIDA Academic All-District
  Second-team All-Big Ten
  ESPN.com All-Bowl Team
- Aaron Maybin
  Sporting News Freshman All-Big Ten
- Anthony Morelli
  Big Ten Sportsmanship Award
- Jordan Norwood
  ESPN The Magazine CoSIDA Academic All-District
- Rich Ohrnberger
  Second-team All-Big Ten
- Evan Royster
  Sporting News Freshman All-Big Ten
- Mark Rubin
  ESPN The Magazine CoSIDA Academic All-District
- A. Q. Shipley
  First-team All-Big Ten (conference coaches selection)
  ESPN All-Big Ten Team
  ESPN.com All-Bowl Team
- Derrick Williams
  Pontiac Game Changing Performance (Sep. 8)
- Stefen Wisniewski
  Sporting News Freshman All-Big Ten

== Postseason ==
Penn State finished the season ranked #25 in the final USA Today college football poll, earning Penn State its 33rd Top 25 finish under Joe Paterno.

Penn State finished second in football attendance for the fifth time this decade and in the top four for the 17th consecutive year, averaging 108,917 for seven home games, including two primetime crowds of 110,134 on October 27 to watch Penn State host Ohio State, the second-largest in Beaver Stadium history, and 110,078 on September 8 to watch Penn State beat Notre Dame, the third-largest in Beaver Stadium history. Penn State finished the season with a sellout crowd of 66,166 at the Alamo Bowl.

In January, junior cornerback Justin King announced that he was going to declare for the 2008 NFL draft, skipping his final year of eligibility. King had graduated the previous semester with a degree in liberal arts with an emphasis in sports management. According to King's stepfather and high school coach, "He wanted to get an education and a degree from Penn State, which he did. He wanted to help turn Penn State around, and he did that, too."

Three players were invited to the NFL Scouting Combine, held February 20–26 in Indianapolis, Indiana: Dan Connor, Justin King, and Anthony Morelli.

=== NFL draft ===
Two Penn State players were selected in the 2008 NFL draft.

Round	Pick	Overall	Name	Position	Team
3rd	11	74	Dan Connor	Linebacker	Carolina Panthers
4th	2	101	Justin King	Cornerback	St. Louis Rams

=== All-star games ===
Game	Date	Site	Players
83rd East–West Shrine Game	January 19, 2008	Robertson Stadium, Houston, Texas	Anthony Morelli
59th Senior Bowl	January 26, 2008	Ladd–Peebles Stadium, Mobile, Alabama	Dan Connor
2nd Texas vs. The Nation Game	February 2, 2008	Sun Bowl Stadium, El Paso, Texas	Rodney Kinlaw
