= 2006 Penn State Nittany Lions football team =

American college football season

2006 Penn State Nittany Lions football

Outback Bowl champion

Outback Bowl, W 20–10 vs. Tennessee
- Conference: Big Ten Conference

Ranking
- Coaches: No. 25
- AP: No. 24
- Record: 9–4 (5–3 Big Ten)
- Head coach: Joe Paterno (41st season)
- Offensive coordinator: Galen Hall (3rd season)
- Offensive scheme: Pro-style
- Defensive coordinator: Tom Bradley (7th season)
- Base defense: 4–3
- Home stadium: Beaver Stadium

2006 Big Ten Conference football standings
	Conf.			Overall
Team	W		L	W		L
No. 2 Ohio State $	8	–	0	12	–	1
No. 8 Michigan %	7	–	1	11	–	2
No. 7 Wisconsin	7	–	1	12	–	1
No. 24 Penn State	5	–	3	9	–	4
Purdue	5	–	3	8	–	6
Minnesota	3	–	5	6	–	7
Indiana	3	–	5	5	–	7
Northwestern	2	–	6	4	–	8
Iowa	2	–	6	6	–	7
Illinois	1	–	7	2	–	10
Michigan State	1	–	7	4	–	8
$ – BCS representative as conference champion; % – BCS at-large representative; Rankings from AP Poll

The 2006 Penn State Nittany Lions football team represented the Pennsylvania State University in the 2006 NCAA Division I FBS football season. The team's head coach was Joe Paterno. It played its home games at Beaver Stadium in University Park, Pennsylvania.

The season began with the Nittany Lions ranked #19 in the AP and Coaches preseason polls. The team dropped out of the rankings with losses to Notre Dame and Ohio State, but finished the season ranked #25 in the Coaches Poll and #24 in the AP Poll with a final record of 9–4.

== Preseason ==
The team had key losses due to graduation, including Michael Robinson, Tamba Hali, Alan Zemaitis, Anwar Phillips, Calvin Lowry, and Ethan Kilmer. Paul Posluszny and offensive tackle Levi Brown decided to return to the team for the 2006 season, despite speculation both players would enter the NFL draft. Posluszny and star receiver Derrick Williams returned from injuries that caused them to miss time in 2005.

Paul Posluszny and Levi Brown were elected co-captains of the football team for 2006. Posluszny becomes the team's first two-time captain since 1969. Posluszny was also named the 2006 Big Ten and consensus national pre-season Defensive Player of the Year.

Penn State was ranked No. 19 in both the AP and Coaches college football preseason polls.

=== Recruiting class ===
College recruiting
Name	Hometown	School	Height	Weight	40^{‡}	Commit date
Chris Bell; WR	Norfolk, VA	Granby HS	6 ft 3 in (1.91 m)	205 lb (93 kg)	4.50	Oct 17, 2005
Chris Bell; WR	Recruit ratings: Scout: Rivals: (81)					
Navorro Bowman; LB	Forestville, MD	Suitland HS	6 ft 1 in (1.85 m)	218 lb (99 kg)	4.70	Dec 8, 2005
Navorro Bowman; LB	Recruit ratings: Scout: Rivals: (77)					
Brett Brackett; QB	Lawrenceville, NJ	Lawrenceville, NJ	6 ft 6 in (1.98 m)	235 lb (107 kg)	4.71	May 12, 2005
Brett Brackett; QB	Recruit ratings: Scout: Rivals: (75)					
Brent Carter; RB	Pottstown, PA	Pottsgrove SHS	6 ft 2 in (1.88 m)	200 lb (91 kg)	4.55	Jan 29, 2006
Brent Carter; RB	Recruit ratings: Scout: Rivals: (40)					
Pat Devlin; QB	Downingtown, PA	Downingtown East HS	6 ft 4 in (1.93 m)	200 lb (91 kg)	4.70	Jan 23, 2006
Pat Devlin; QB	Recruit ratings: Scout: Rivals: (82)					
Lou Eliades; OL	Oakhurst, NJ	Ocean Township HS	6 ft 4 in (1.93 m)	283 lb (128 kg)	5.00	Dec 27, 2005
Lou Eliades; OL	Recruit ratings: Scout: Rivals: (78)					
Maurice Evans; DE	Middle Village, NY	Christ The King Regional HS	6 ft 3 in (1.91 m)	252 lb (114 kg)	4.70	Jan 7, 2006
Maurice Evans; DE	Recruit ratings: Scout: Rivals: (91)					
Bani Gbadyu; LB	Gaithersburg, MD	Quince Orchard HS	6 ft 1 in (1.85 m)	210 lb (95 kg)	4.60	Dec 14, 2005
Bani Gbadyu; LB	Recruit ratings: Scout: Rivals: (81)					
Cedric Jeffries; S	Egg Harbor Twp, NJ	Egg Harbor Township HS	6 ft 3 in (1.91 m)	195 lb (88 kg)	4.60	Dec 20, 2005
Cedric Jeffries; S	Recruit ratings: Scout: Rivals: (74)					
Doug Klopacz; OL	Montvale, NJ	St. Joseph Regional HS	6 ft 3 in (1.91 m)	260 lb (120 kg)	4.75	Aug 12, 2005
Doug Klopacz; OL	Recruit ratings: Scout: Rivals: (40)					
Abe Koroma; DT	Hershey, PA	Milton Hershey School	6 ft 2 in (1.88 m)	270 lb (120 kg)	4.90	Jul 30, 2005
Abe Koroma; DT	Recruit ratings: Scout: Rivals: (40)					
Eric Latimore; DE	Middletown, DE	Middletown HS	6 ft 6 in (1.98 m)	240 lb (110 kg)	4.90	Oct 10, 2005
Eric Latimore; DE	Recruit ratings: Scout: Rivals: (76)					
Antonio Logan-El; OL	Forestville, MD	Forestville HS	6 ft 6 in (1.98 m)	310 lb (140 kg)	5.20	Jan 24, 2006
Antonio Logan-El; OL	Recruit ratings: Scout: Rivals: (78)					
Aaron Maybin; DE	Ellicott City, MD	Mt. Hebron HS	6 ft 3 in (1.91 m)	220 lb (100 kg)	4.67	Oct 17, 2005
Aaron Maybin; DE	Recruit ratings: Scout: Rivals: (77)					
Travis McBride; S	McKeesport, PA	McKeesport Area SHS	6 ft 1 in (1.85 m)	195 lb (88 kg)	4.50	Dec 12, 2005
Travis McBride; S	Recruit ratings: Scout: Rivals: (76)					
Tom McEowen; DT	Langhorne, PA	Neshaminy HS	6 ft 4 in (1.93 m)	280 lb (130 kg)	5.10	Jul 11, 2005
Tom McEowen; DT	Recruit ratings: Scout: Rivals: (77)					
Jared Odrick; DT	Lebanon, PA	Lebanon SHS	6 ft 6 in (1.98 m)	285 lb (129 kg)	5.00	Dec 19, 2005
Jared Odrick; DT	Recruit ratings: Scout: Rivals: (76)					
Ollie Ogbu; DT	New Berlin, NY	Milford Academy	6 ft 2 in (1.88 m)	300 lb (140 kg)	4.96	May 13, 2005
Ollie Ogbu; DT	Recruit ratings: Scout: Rivals: (40)					
Andrew Quarless; TE	Uniondale, NY	Uniondale HS	6 ft 4 in (1.93 m)	225 lb (102 kg)	4.50	Jan 13, 2006
Andrew Quarless; TE	Recruit ratings: Scout: Rivals: (77)					
Evan Royster; RB	Chantilly, VA	Westfield HS	6 ft 0 in (1.83 m)	190 lb (86 kg)	4.45	Jan 19, 2006
Evan Royster; RB	Recruit ratings: Scout: Rivals: (72)					
Phillip Taylor; DT	Brandywine, MD	Gwynn Park HS	6 ft 4 in (1.93 m)	340 lb (150 kg)	5.50	Jan 24, 2006
Phillip Taylor; DT	Recruit ratings: Scout: Rivals: (79)					
Johnnie Troutman; DE	Pemberton, NJ	Pemberton Twp. HS	6 ft 4 in (1.93 m)	270 lb (120 kg)	4.90	Jan 21, 2006
Johnnie Troutman; DE	Recruit ratings: Scout: Rivals: (77)					
A.J. Wallace; CB	Pomfret, MD	Maurice J McDonough HS	6 ft 1 in (1.85 m)	195 lb (88 kg)	4.40	Jan 7, 2006
A.J. Wallace; CB	Recruit ratings: Scout: Rivals: (82)					
Overall recruit ranking: Scout: 6 Rivals: 6
‡ Refers to 40-yard dash; Note: In many cases, Scout, Rivals, 247Sports, On3, and ESPN may conflict in their listings of height, weight and 40 time.; In these cases, the average was taken. ESPN grades are on a 100-point scale.; Sources: "Penn State Commit List for 2006". Rivals.; "Scout.com Football Recruiting: Penn State". Scout.; "RecruitTracker 2006: Penn State". ESPN.; "Scout.com Team Recruiting Rankings". Scout.; "2006 Team Ranking". Rivals.com.

== Schedule ==
Date	Time	Opponent	Rank	Site	TV	Result	Attendance	Source
September 2	3:30 p.m.	Akron*	No. 19	Beaver Stadium; University Park, PA	ESPN2	W 34–16	106,505	
September 9	3:30 p.m.	at No. 4 Notre Dame*	No. 19	Notre Dame Stadium; Notre Dame, IN (rivalry)	NBC	L 17–41	80,795	
September 16	3:30 p.m.	No. 6 (FCS) Youngstown State*	No. 25	Beaver Stadium; University Park, PA	ESPNU	W 37–3	104,953	
September 23	3:30 p.m.	at No. 1 Ohio State	No. 24	Ohio Stadium; Columbus, OH (rivalry, College GameDay)	ABC	L 6–28	105,266	
September 30	3:30 p.m.	Northwestern		Beaver Stadium; University Park, PA	ABC	W 33–7	108,837	
October 7	12:00 p.m.	at Minnesota		Hubert H. Humphrey Metrodome; Minneapolis, MN (Governor's Victory Bell)	ESPN Plus	W 28–27 ^{OT}	45,227	
October 14	8:00 p.m.	No. 4 Michigan		Beaver Stadium; University Park, PA (rivalry)	ABC	L 10–17	110,007	
October 21	12:00 p.m.	Illinois^{†}		Beaver Stadium; University Park, PA	ESPN2	W 26–12	108,112	
October 28	12:00 p.m.	at Purdue		Ross–Ade Stadium; West Lafayette, IN	ABC	W 12–0	58,025	
November 4	12:00 p.m.	at No. 17 Wisconsin		Camp Randall Stadium; Madison, WI	ABC	L 3–13	81,777	
November 11	3:30 p.m.	Temple*		Beaver Stadium; University Park, PA	ESPN Plus	W 47–0	105,950	
November 18	12:00 p.m.	Michigan State		Beaver Stadium; University Park, PA (rivalry)	ESPN2	W 17–13	108,607	
January 1, 2007	11:00 a.m.	vs. No. 17 Tennessee*		Raymond James Stadium; Tampa, FL (Outback Bowl)	ESPN	W 20–10	65,601	
*Non-conference game; ^{†}Homecoming; Rankings from AP Poll released prior to the game; All times are in Eastern time

== Personnel ==
=== Roster ===
2006 Penn State Nittany Lions football team roster
Players
Coaches
Offense

Pos.	#	Name	Class
WR	2	Derrick Williams	So
WR	3	Deon Butler	So
WR	4	Terrell Golden	Jr
QB	5	Brett Brackett	Fr
QB	6	Mike Hart	Jr
QB	7	Pat Devlin	Fr
RB	8	Rodney Kinlaw	Jr
TE	10	Andrew Quarless	Fr
QB	13	Kevin Suhey	Fr
QB	14	Anthony Morelli	Jr
QB	15	Paul Cianciolo	So
TE	16	Francis Claude	Fr
QB	17	Daryll Clark	Fr
WR	18	Patrick Mauti	Fr
WR	19	Chris Bell	Fr
RB	22	Evan Royster	Fr
WR	24	Jordan Norwood	So
WR	25	Brendan Perretta	Jr
RB	26	Tony Hunt	Sr
WR	28	Graham Zug	Fr
FB	30	BranDon Snow	Sr
RB	32	Brent Carter	Fr
RB	33	Austin Scott	Sr
RB	34	Matt Hahn	Jr
WR	35	Jesse Alfreno	Fr
FB	38	Dan Lawlor	So
RB	39	Nick Pinchek	Jr
RB	42	Charles Ramsey	Fr
TE	44	Patrick Hall	Sr
G	56	Austin Hinton	So
C	57	A.Q. Shipley	So
G	58	Greg Harrison	So
C	60	Patick Weber	Jr
OT	61	Matt Lowry	Fr
C	62	Ross Muir	So
G	63	Joe Toriello	So
G	64	Rich Ohrnberger	So
G	65	Robert Price	Sr
OT	67	Levi Brown (C)	Sr
OL	68	Doug Klopacz	Fr
OL	69	Mike Lucian	So
OT	70	Wyatt Bowman	So
OT	71	Mark Farris	Sr
G	73	Dennis Landolt	Fr
OT	74	Johnnie Troutman	Fr
OT	75	Lee Kuzemchak	Sr
OL	75	Antonio Logan-El	Fr
G	76	Gerald Cadogan	So
OL	77	Lou Eliades	Fr
OT	78	John Shaw	Jr
OT	79	Chris Auletta	Jr
TE	81	Brennan Coakley	Fr
FB	82	Mickey Shuler	Fr
WR	83	Kevin Cousins	Fr
WR	84	James McDonald	Fr
TE	87	Greg Miskinis	So
TE	88	Kevin Darling	Sr
TE	89	Jordan Lyons	So

Defense

Pos.	#	Name	Class
CB	1	Justin King	So
LB	5	Jerome Hayes	Fr
S	6	Donnie Johnson	Sr
S	7	Anthony Scirrotto	So
S	9	Jason Ganter	Jr
CB	10	Lydell Sargeant	So
CB	11	Tony Davis	So
CB	12	A.J. Wallace	Fr
DT	13	Jay Alford	Sr
LB	15	Bani Gbadyu	Fr
LB	18	Navorro Bowman	Fr
LB	19	Andy Kubic	Sr
LB	20	Tim Shaw	Sr
CB	21	Knowledge Timmons	Fr
S	22	Darien Hardy	Sr
S	23	Nolan McCready	Sr
CB	25	Devin Fentress	So
S	27	Ben Gummo	Fr
DB	27	Travis McBride	Fr
CB	28	Willie Harriott	Fr
DB	29	Cedric Jeffries	Fr
LB	31	Paul Posluszny (C)	Sr
S	37	Spencer Ridenhour	So
DB	39	Doug Rheam	Fr
LB	40	Dan Connor	Jr
LB	41	Nic Yocum	Jr
LB	43	Josh Hull	Fr
LB	45	Sean Lee	So
LB	46	Tyrell Sales	So
DE	47	Josh Gaines	So
DE	48	Maurice Evans	Fr
LB	51	Joe Cianciolo	Sr
LB	52	Dontey Brown	So
DT	53	Steve Roach	Sr
DE	54	Jed Hill	So
DT	55	Tom McEowen	Fr
LB	57	Chris Mauriello	Jr
DE	59	Aaron Maybin	Fr
DT	74	Abe Koroma	Fr
S	80	Mark Rubin	So
DT	85	Ollie Ogbu	Fr
DE	87	Chris Rogers	So
DL	90	Phillip Taylor	Fr
DE	91	Jared Odrick	Fr
DT	92	Ed Johnson	Sr
DT	93	Chris Baker	Fr
DE	94	Tom Golarz	Fr
DT	95	Elijah Robinson	So
DE	99	Jim Shaw	Sr

Special teams

Pos.	#	Name	Class
K	23	Kevin Kelly	So
P	36	Jeremy Kapinos	Sr
K	42	Collin Wagner	Fr
P	44	Jeremy Boone	Fr
P	49	Brandon Ream	Sr
K	90	Nick Daise	Jr

Head coach

- Joe Paterno

Coordinators/assistant coaches

Legend

- (C) Team captain
- (S) Suspended
- (I) Ineligible
- Injured
- Redshirt

Roster
Last update: August, 2006

=== Coaching staff ===
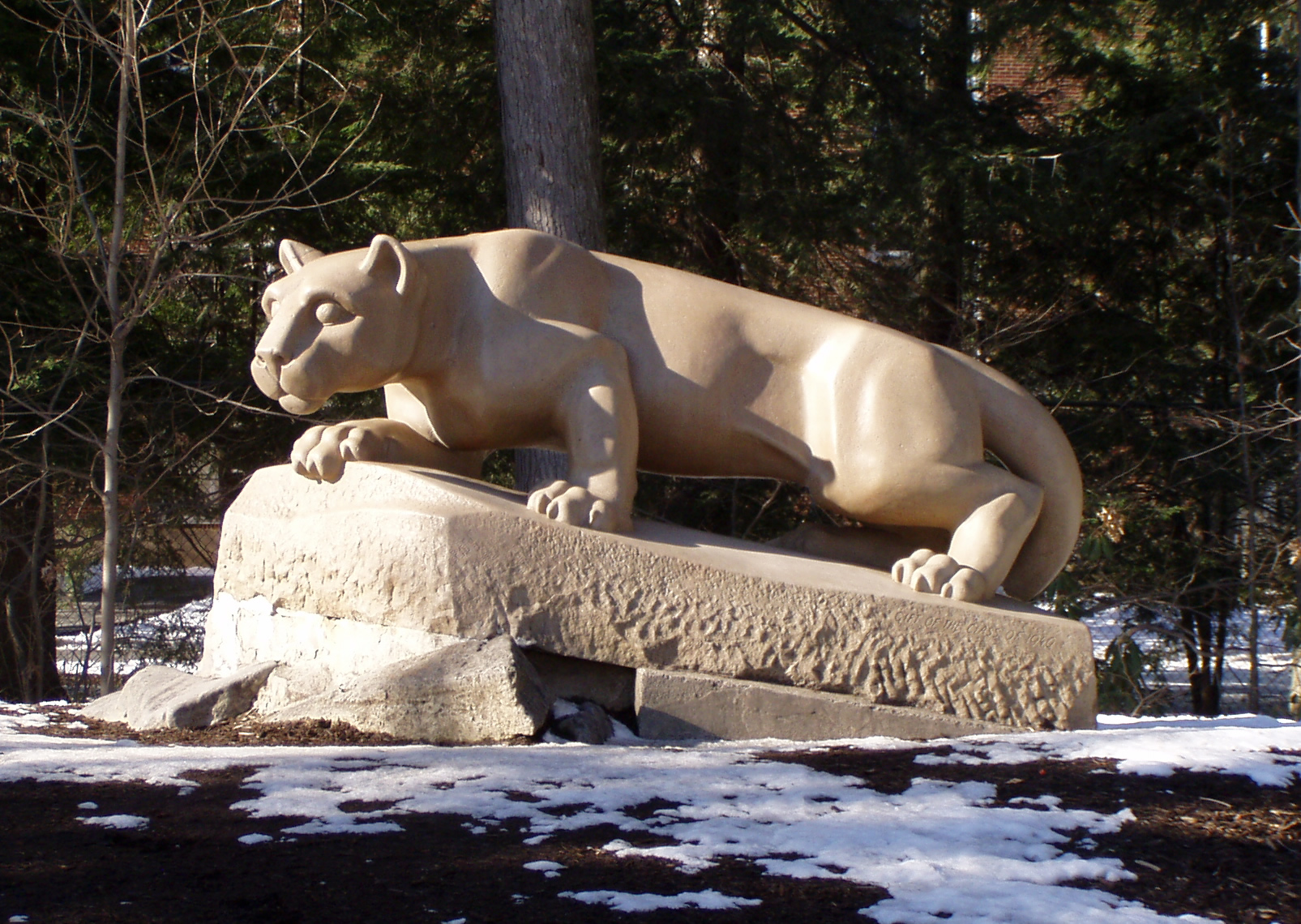
The Nittany Lion

- Joe Paterno – Head Coach
- Dick Anderson – Offensive Line (Guards and Centers)
- Tom Bradley – Defensive Coordinator and Cornerbacks
- Galen Hall – Offensive Coordinator and Running Backs
- Larry Johnson, Sr. – Defensive Line
- Bill Kenney – Offensive Tackles and Tight Ends
- Mike McQueary – Wide Receivers and Recruiting Coordinator
- Brian Norwood – Safeties
- Jay Paterno – Quarterbacks
- Ron Vanderlinden – Linebackers
- John Thomas – Strength and Conditioning

== Game summaries ==
=== September 2: Akron ===
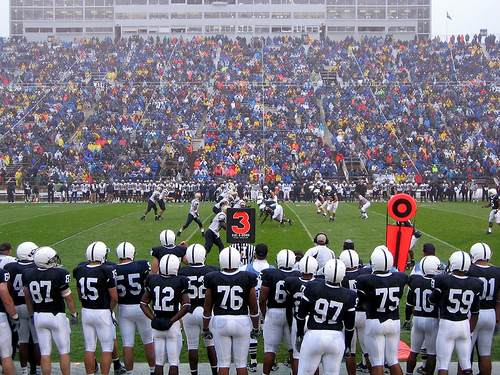
The Nittany Lions and Zips played in the remnants of Hurricane Ernesto in the season opener.

	1	2	3	4	Total
Akron	0	3	6	7	16
Penn State	10	7	7	10	34

Penn State played the Akron Zips in its home opener. Akron was unranked, however the team finished as the 2005 MAC Champions. Anthony Morelli threw a 42-yard touchdown on his first pass attempt of his first start. Penn State won the game 34–16. Akron kept it respectably close for a while before Penn State pulled away with a commanding 34–9 lead, allowing a late Zips touchdown to once again make it look respectable.

=== September 9: Notre Dame ===
	1	2	3	4	Total
Penn State	0	0	3	14	17
Notre Dame	3	17	14	7	41

Penn State played the Notre Dame Fighting Irish in South Bend, Indiana. After a close first quarter, Notre Dame pulled away from the young Penn State squad to win 41–17.

=== September 16: Youngstown State ===
	1	2	3	4	Total
Youngstown State	0	0	3	0	3
Penn State	0	20	10	7	37

Penn State defeated the Youngstown State Penguins by a score of 37–3 on September 16, 2006 at Beaver Stadium.

The Youngstown State Penguins were the 150th different team to face Penn State since 1887, the first year for Penn State football.

=== September 23: Ohio State ===
	1	2	3	4	Total
Penn State	0	3	0	3	6
Ohio State	0	0	7	21	28

Penn State lost to the number one ranked Ohio State Buckeyes in Columbus, Ohio on September 23, 2006, by the score of 28–6 in a game closer than the final score would indicate. Despite the score, Penn State led in many statistical areas, such as first downs, controlling the clock, and total yards, but only had six points to show for their dominating effort. After a scoreless first half, in which the Nittany Lions messed up a chance to score an early touchdown because fullback Matt Hahn broke loose, but was tackled near the goal line and fumbled before the ball crossed the plane. However, Penn State scored a field goal right before halftime after putting together their second long drive of the first half. Penn State led 3–0 at halftime, and controlled the tempo in much of the second half, despite the Buckeyes going up 7–3 following a missed Penn State field goal. Early in the fourth quarter, Troy Smith threw the football away, down the field to avoid a sack in a tipped, nearly intercepted, up for grabs pass that happened to be caught for a touchdown by Brian Robiskie. The Nittany Lions, still playing like they were in control of the game, responded with a strong drive that was called back at the 1 yard line for a false start. The Nittany Lions had to settle for a field goal, which helped shift the momentum to the Buckeyes, but Penn State would gain a full head of steam late in the game. The score was 14–6 in favor of the Buckeyes and Penn State was driving downfield with less than three minutes left. As Penn State led another potentially scoring drive far down the field, hoping to tie the game up at 14–14, it was intercepted and returned for a touchdown with roughly 2 minutes left on the clock. However, Malcolm Jenkins spiked the ball at the one yard line, which rolled into the endzone untouched. This was only noticed after the game. Antonio Smith returned another interception to clinch the victory with 1:07 remaining on the clock, this time from midfield. As ESPN had said, this allowed the Buckeyes to make the victory look easy when, in fact, it was a hard-fought victory, some Penn State fans feel that the Nittany Lions were the better team and should have won that contest, failing to realize that the mistakes that they made, even if it was "handing the game over on a silver platter", are as much a part of football as any other element, which is why a defense that can force turnovers is so highly regarded.

=== September 30: Northwestern ===
	1	2	3	4	Total
Northwestern	0	7	0	0	7
Penn State	6	10	17	0	33

Penn State defeated the Northwestern Wildcats 33–7 on September 30, 2006 at Beaver Stadium. Deon Butler set a Penn State record with 216 receiving yards, breaking O.J. McDuffie's record of 202 yards set against Boston College in 1992. Tony Hunt ran for 137 yards and three touchdowns. Anthony Morelli completed 19-of-33 passes for 288 yards.

=== October 7: Minnesota ===
	1	2	3	4	OT	Total
Penn State	7	7	0	7	7	28
Minnesota	7	0	0	14	6	27

Penn State defeated the Minnesota Golden Gophers 28–27 in overtime. Tony Hunt rushed for 144 yards and three touchdowns (2 rushing), the last in overtime for the game-winning touchdown. Anthony Morelli threw for 281 yards and two touchdowns despite playing with a dislocated ring finger on his left (non-throwing) hand. The game, tied at overtime, was decided by two factors, a missed extra point kick, and a pass interference penalty on Penn State's drive to give them a fresh set of downs. Both proved critical, as Penn State soon converted the touchdown and kicked the extra point to escape with the win.

=== October 14: Michigan ===
	1	2	3	4	Total
Michigan	0	10	7	0	17
Penn State	0	3	0	7	10

Michigan's defensive front seven was the story of the game, collecting seven sacks and holding the Nittany Lions to −14 net rushing yards. On a third-quarter pass play, Alan Branch knocked Penn State's quarterback Anthony Morelli out of the game with a concussion; Penn State's backup quarterback Daryl Clark was later injured on a rushing attempt. Third-string quarterback Paul Cianciolo managed to throw the Nittany Lions' only touchdown pass of the game. The game was a homecoming for Pennsylvania native Henne, who played the only game of his career at Penn State. With Manningham not playing due to a knee injury suffered against Michigan State, Arrington and Breaston caught the bulk of Henne's passes, each collecting five receptions. Hart picked up his sixth 100-yard rushing game of the season and scored the winning touchdown

=== October 21: Illinois ===
	1	2	3	4	Total
Illinois	3	6	0	3	12
Penn State	3	0	14	9	26

Carried mostly by the play of its defense, Penn State defeated the Illinois Fighting Illini 26–12 during homecoming weekend. Strong safety Anthony Scirrotto had two interceptions and returned an attempted onside kick for a touchdown.

Punter Jeremy Kapinos was named Big Ten Special Teams Player of the Week for the second time this season, averaging 45.6 yards per punt, with a long of 57 yards. He pinned Illinois inside its own 20 yard line four times. He also surpassed Ralph Giacomarro to become first all-time in career punting yardage (9,578). Linebacker Paul Posluszny was also named the Big Ten Defensive Player of the Week, notching a season-high 13 tackles and forced a fumble that was returned for a touchdown.

=== October 28: Purdue ===
	1	2	3	4	Total
Penn State	3	3	0	6	12
Purdue	0	0	0	0	0

Penn State's low-scoring win on the road against the Boilermakers saw running back Tony Hunt rush 31 times for 142 yards and a touchdown (along with 2 receptions for 36 yards) as the Nittany Lions posted a shutout against Purdue, their first ever under head coach Joe Tiller. The low score was primarily a result of the high winds and cold weather. It was Penn State's first shutout since a 49–0 win over the Northwestern Wildcats in October 2002.

Recording a game-high 12 tackles and an interception, linebacker Dan Connor was named Big Ten Defensive Player of the Week.

=== November 4: Wisconsin ===
	1	2	3	4	Total
Penn State	0	3	0	0	3
Wisconsin	3	7	3	0	13

Penn State suffered a 13–3 loss on the road versus the Wisconsin Badgers. Wisconsin kicker Taylor Mehlhaff put the Badgers on the scoreboard first with a 37-yard field goal in the first quarter. In the second quarter, Penn State kicker Kevin Kelly tied the score with a 39-yard field goal, but Badgers quarterback John Stocco countered with 14-yard touchdown pass to Paul Hubbard. Wisconsin added a 20-yard field goal in the third quarter. With the long-held ten point lead, the Badgers were the only Big Ten team that Penn State lost to that they had not played completely down to the wire. In both games, they had late chances to win the game, but in this game, again a stubborn defensive struggle, Penn State was unable to kick a second field goal that would have at least made it interesting late.

Recording 14 tackles, linebacker Paul Posluszny broke Greg Buttle's record for career tackles. Posluszny finished the game with 349 career tackles in a game where Penn State's defense did their part to hold Wisconsin to few yardage and points.

Penn State head coach Joe Paterno was injured during a sideline collision in the third quarter. Although reluctant to leave the sideline, he was taken to the locker room for evaluation and flown back to Penn State ahead of the team. There it was revealed that Paterno had a pair of fractures to his tibia along with tears of his anterior cruciate and medial collateral ligaments.

=== November 11: Temple ===
	1	2	3	4	Total
Temple	0	0	0	0	0
Penn State	21	10	10	6	47

Running back Tony Hunt had a career day, scoring 4 touchdowns and rushing for 167 yards in two and a half quarters of play, as Penn State shut out the Temple Owls 47–0 with coach Joe Paterno absent from the sidelines for the first time since 1977. Derrick Williams scored on a 75-yard punt return, while placekicker Kevin Kelly added field goals of 19 and 33 yards. Reserve quarterback Daryll Clark scored on a 4th quarter run. Following the game, Penn State captains Levi Brown and Paul Posluszny visited Paterno at his home to present him with the game ball.

The game was the first in Happy Valley for former Nittany Lion tight end Al Golden as Temple head coach.

=== November 18: Michigan State ===
	1	2	3	4	Total
Michigan State	10	3	0	0	13
Penn State	0	7	7	3	17

23 seniors helped close out their regular season careers as Nittany Lions by winning the Land Grant Trophy with a 17–13 win over the Michigan State Spartans. Coach Joe Paterno, still nursing a broken shinbone, coached from the pressbox. Running back Tony Hunt overcame 2 first quarter fumbles to tally his seventh 100-yard game this season, rushing for 129 yards on 29 attempts. Quarterback Anthony Morelli, who also had 2 fumbles, finished 17-of-37 for 220 yards.

=== January 1: 2007 Outback Bowl – Tennessee ===
	1	2	3	4	Total
Tennessee	3	7	0	0	10
Penn State	0	10	0	10	20

The 2007 Outback Bowl featured Penn State against the Tennessee Volunteers of the SEC. Penn State last participated in the game in 1999, when they won over the Kentucky Wildcats by the score of 26–14. Tennessee last played in Tampa in the 1993 Hall of Fame Bowl, defeating the Boston College Eagles 38–23. Before this game, Penn State's last game versus Tennessee was the 1994 Florida Citrus Bowl where they crushed the heavily favored Volunteers in an easy 31–13 victory.

Penn State defeated the favored Tennessee 20–10 for Joe Paterno's record 22nd bowl win. Tony Hunt led the PSU offense running for 158 yards on 31 carries. Tony Davis returned a fumble 88 yards for the game-winning touchdown. First Team All-Big Ten Conference strong safety Anthony Scirrotto also recorded his sixth interception of the season. The key play of the game was a fumble recovery returned for a touchdown early in the fourth quarter. Late in the fourth, Penn State ran down the clock, but despite stalling in the red zone, kicked a field goal that put the game out of reach.

== Rankings ==
Ranking movements Legend: ██ Increase in ranking ██ Decrease in ranking — = Not ranked
	Week															
Poll	Pre	1	2	3	4	5	6	7	8	9	10	11	12	13	14	Final
AP	19	19	25	24	—	—	—	—	—	—	—	—	—	—	—	24
Coaches	19	19	—	—	—	—	—	—	—	—	—	—	—	—	—	25
Harris	Not released				—	—	—	—	—	—	—	—	—	—	—	Not released
BCS	Not released							—	—	—	—	—	25	—	—	Not released

== Awards ==
=== Watchlists ===
- Levi Brown
  Lombardi Award watchlist
  Outland Trophy watchlist
- Dan Connor
  Chuck Bednarik Award watchlist
  Dick Butkus Award watchlist
- Tony Hunt
  Doak Walker Award watchlist
- Jeremy Kapinos
  Ray Guy Award watchlist
- Paul Posluszny
  Bronko Nagurski Trophy watchlist
  Chuck Bednarik Award watchlist
  Lindy's Football Heisman Trophy watchlist
  Lombardi Award watchlist
  Dick Butkus Award watchlist
  Draddy Trophy semifinalist and finalist
  Lott Trophy watchlist
  Walter Camp Player of the Year watchlist
- Tim Shaw
  Chuck Bednarik Award watchlist
- Derrick Williams
  Maxwell Award watchlist

=== Players ===
- Jay Alford
  Third-team Associated Press All-American
  Second-team All-Big Ten (conference coaches selection)
- Levi Brown
  Second-team Walter Camp All-American
  Second-team Sporting News All-American
  Third-team Associated Press All-American
  Second-team All-Big Ten
- Gerald Cadogan
  ESPN The Magazine CoSIDA Academic All-District
- Dan Connor
  First-team Sporting News All-American
  Second-team Associated Press All-American
  Second-team All-Big Ten
  Big Ten Defensive Player of the Week (Sep. 2)
  Big Ten Defensive Player of the Week (Oct. 28)
- Maurice Evans
  Sporting News Big Ten All-Freshman Team
- Tony Hunt
  Second-team All-Big Ten
  Big Ten Offensive Player of the Week (Nov. 11)
  Most Valuable Player, 2007 Outback Bowl
  Most Valuable Player, 2007 Senior Bowl
- Jeremy Kapinos
  Third-team Associated Press All-American
  Second-team All-Big Ten
  Big Ten Special Teams Player of the Week (Sep. 23)
  Big Ten Special Teams Player of the Week (Oct. 21)
- Justin King
  Second-team All-Big Ten (conference coaches selection)
- Nolan McCready
  ESPN The Magazine CoSIDA Academic All-District
  Second-team ESPN The Magazine CoSIDA Academic All-American
- Paul Posluszny
  2006 Bednarik Award winner
  ESPN The Magazine CoSIDA Academic All-District
  First-team ESPN The Magazine CoSIDA Academic All-American
  ESPN The Magazine CoSIDA Academic All-American of the Year
  First-team Associated Press All-American
  First-team Walter Camp All-American
  First-team All-Big Ten
  Second-team Sporting News All-American
  Big Ten Defensive Player of the Week (Oct. 21)
  National Football Foundation Scholar-Athlete fellowship
  NCAA Defensive Player of the Year
- Andrew Quarless
  Sporting News Big Ten All-Freshman Team
- Anthony Scirrotto
  First-team All-Big Ten (conference media selection)
  ESPN.com All-Bowl Team
- Tim Shaw
  ESPN The Magazine CoSIDA Academic All-District
  First-team ESPN The Magazine CoSIDA Academic All-American

== Postseason ==
Penn State finished the season ranked number 24 in the final AP college football poll and number 25 in the final USA Today college football poll, earning Penn State its 32nd Top 25 finish under Joe Paterno.

The team's success helped Penn State finish second in football attendance for the fourth time this decade and in the top four for the 16th consecutive year, averaging 107,567 for seven home games, including a crowd of 110,007 on October 14 to watch Penn State host Michigan in primetime, the second-largest in Beaver Stadium history. Penn State finished the season with a sellout crowd of 65,601 at the Outback Bowl.

Five players participated in the NFL Scouting Combine, held February 22–27 in Indianapolis, IN: Jay Alford, Levi Brown, Tony Hunt, Paul Posluszny, and Tim Shaw.

=== NFL draft ===
Five Penn State players were selected in the 2007 NFL draft.

Round	Pick	Overall	Name	Position	Team
1st	5	5	Levi Brown	Offensive tackle	Arizona Cardinals
2nd	2	34	Paul Posluszny	Linebacker	Buffalo Bills
3rd	18	81	Jay Alford	Defensive tackle	New York Giants
3rd	27	90	Tony Hunt	Running back	Philadelphia Eagles
5th	27	164	Tim Shaw	Linebacker	Carolina Panthers

=== All-star games ===
Game	Date	Site	Players
61st Hula Bowl	January 14, 2007	Aloha Stadium, Honolulu, Hawaii	Jay Alford, Ed Johnson, Tim Shaw
58th Senior Bowl	January 27, 2007	Ladd–Peebles Stadium, Mobile, Alabama	Levi Brown, Tony Hunt, Paul Posluszny
