= 2007 Alamo Bowl =

2007 Valero Alamo Bowl
Penn State Nittany Lions	Texas A&M Aggies
(8–4)	(7–5)
Big Ten	Big 12
24	17
Head coach: Joe Paterno	Head coach: Gary Darnell (interim)
	1	2	3	4	Total
Penn State	0	17	7	0	24
Texas A&M	14	0	3	0	17
- Date: December 29, 2007
- Season: 2007
- Stadium: Alamodome
- Location: San Antonio, Texas
- MVP: Offense: Rodney Kinlaw; Defense: Sean Lee
- Favorite: Penn State by 5½
- Referee: R. G. Detillier (C-USA)
- Halftime show: Aggie Band and Blue Band
- Attendance: 66,166

United States TV coverage
- Network: ESPN
- Announcers: Chris Fowler, Doug Flutie, Craig James, and Erin Andrews
- Nielsen ratings: 2.7

The 2007 Valero Alamo Bowl was a college football bowl game played on December 29, 2007, in the 65,000-seat Alamodome in San Antonio, Texas, and nationally televised by ESPN. The game was one of the 2007–08 NCAA football bowl games that concluded the 2007 NCAA Division I FBS football season. It was the 15th Alamo Bowl and the first Alamo Bowl sponsored by the Valero Energy Corporation.

The game featured the Penn State Nittany Lions and the Texas A&M Aggies, who were both unranked in the national polls. The two teams had met once in the Alamo Bowl in 1999, when Penn State shutout Texas A&M 24–0. The Aggies were coached by interim head coach Gary Darnell, who had taken over after Dennis Franchione resigned, and the Nittany Lions were coached by Hall of Famer Joe Paterno, who marked the 2007 Alamo Bowl as the 500th game of his head coaching career.

== Leading into the game ==
This was the Aggies' 30th bowl appearance, and their third in the Alamo Bowl. In their first Alamo Bowl game in 1995, the 19th-ranked Aggies defeated the 14th-ranked Michigan Wolverines 22–20. In their second appearance in 1999, 13th-ranked Penn State defeated the 18th-ranked Aggies 24–0. Both the 1995 and 1999 games are two of the five in Alamo Bowl history that attracted sellout crowds, with the 1999 game having the second largest crowd.

One day after Texas A&M head coach Dennis Franchione resigned after the Aggies' last regular season matchup against the Texas Longhorns on November 23, 2007, A&M athletic director Bill Byrne announced defensive coordinator Gary Darnell would coach the Aggies' bowl game as the interim head coach. Two days later, Byrne hired Houston Texans offensive coordinator and former Green Bay Packers head coach Mike Sherman.

Texas A&M officially accepted the invitation to play in the Alamo Bowl on December 2, 2007, against the Penn State Nittany Lions, who accepted their invitation two days earlier on November 30.

This was the Nittany Lions' 40th bowl appearance, and their second in the Alamo Bowl. The 2007 Nittany Lions, who finished 8–4 in their regular season, are led by 42nd-year head coach Joe Paterno, a 2007 College Football Hall of Fame inductee. With a 22–10–1 bowl game record, Paterno is the all-time winningest leader in bowl victories and appearances. He also holds the record for the most undefeated FBS seasons than any other coach in college football history. The 2007 Alamo Bowl marked Paterno's 34th bowl game appearance and 500th game as Penn State head coach.

Prior to the game, among 119 Division I-A teams, the Aggies' rushing offense ranked 13th, and their overall offense ranked 54th. Their total defense ranked 83rd, with a rushing defense ranked 57th and a passing defense ranked 104th. On the other hand, the Nittany Lions have an overall offense ranked 56th, with a 44th-ranked scoring offense. Their overall defense ranked 9th in the nation, with a 6th-ranked rushing defense and an 8th-ranked scoring defense. The defense also ranks 2nd in sacks forced.

During the week of the game, Las Vegas casinos predicted Penn State to win by 5.5 points. A Sunday News sports writer of the Lancaster Newspapers predicted Penn State to win 23–13. College Football News predicted a 34–20 victory for Penn State, while WhatIfSports.com simulated the game 1,001 times and predicted Penn State to win 29–17.

On December 27, 2007, two nights before the game, a Texas A&M yell leader made a controversial joke about Joe Paterno at a joint pep rally on the River Walk. The yell leader screamed "Joe Paterno's on his death bed! And someone needs to find him a casket!" on a microphone to an audience consisting of both Penn State and Texas A&M fans. Penn State fans became stunned at his remark and subsequently booed him. A&M officials apologized to Penn State officials and sent the yell leader home. Paterno responded by saying: "I think everybody has to take things with a grain of salt. ... Some young guy went up there, trying to be funny. Maybe he's accurate, I don't know." Paterno also expressed his indifference toward the comments, adding "Sticks and stones will break your bones but names will never hurt you."

== Game summary ==
Though the game attracted the largest audience in both stadium and bowl history, it only averaged a 2.7 television rating, the lowest for the bowl since the first game in 1993 and a 55 percent drop from the 2006 Alamo Bowl's record-breaking rating of 6.0. The last regular season matchup between the New England Patriots and the New York Giants — which was broadcast around the same time as the 2007 Alamo Bowl — explains this anomaly, as the NFL game was broadcast on two television networks and attracted a total of 34.5 million viewers, the most for a regular season NFL game in more than 12 years.

=== First quarter ===
Penn State won the coin toss and deferred to the second half. The Aggies dominated the first quarter. After a quick three and out in their first possession, they scored a touchdown on their second possession. Penn State converted on fourth-and-short to keep their drive temporarily alive, but they were forced to attempt a field goal, which went wide right. Penn State muffed a kick-return to give the Aggies possession inside the Penn State 20-yard line. A&M lined up in an unbalanced look and scored another touchdown on a run up the middle. Both touchdowns were scored by Mike Goodson, equaling his total for the rest of the 2007 season. A&M gained 96 yards of total offense in the first quarter compared to 89 for Penn State.

=== Second quarter ===
The Nittany Lions roared back in the second quarter. Their second quarter resurgence was not new as the Lions outscored their opponents 131–21 in the second quarter alone. With just over eleven minutes left in the half, Penn State faced fourth-and-three at the Texas A&M 30-yard line. Anthony Morelli threw a pass to Deon Butler for a touchdown. The play was reviewed for more than six minutes and allowed to stand as called on the field. An Aggie fumble led to a second Penn State touchdown which tied the score at 14–14. On that score, Daryll Clark dove towards the end zone and lost possession of the ball, but the on-field official ruled that he still had the ball when he crossed the plane of the goal line. The play was not reviewed. Penn State drove inside the A&M 10-yard line but settled for a Kevin Kelly field goal with 19 seconds remaining in the half. The half-time score was 17–14 Penn State. The Nittany Lions outgained the Aggies 155 yards to 32 in the second quarter.

=== Third quarter ===
In the third quarter, A&M made a field goal and Penn State answered with a touchdown, extending their lead to 24–17.

=== Fourth quarter ===
In the fourth quarter, with Penn State still leading 24–17, the Aggies were facing fourth-and-inches close to the Penn State one-yard line. Instead of giving the ball to Jorvorskie Lane, who is typically very effective in short-yardage situations, the Aggie coaching staff elected to run an option play to the right side. The Penn State defense was ready for it and quarterback Stephen McGee went down for a loss. Lane was visibly upset that he was not used on the play; he walked away from his teammates and was seen on the sidelines with tears running down his face. Penn State took over on downs but the Aggies forced a punt. A&M got the ball back near their 40-yard line with less than three minutes to play in the game. The drive led the Aggies to punt on fourth-and-twenty with 2:09 remaining. The ball went into the end zone for a touchback so Penn State took over on their 20-yard line. Penn State ran out the clock to preserve the win at 24–17.

Scoring summary

Quarter	Time	Drive			Team	Scoring information	Score	
Quarter	Time	Plays	Yards	TOP	Team	Scoring information	PSU	TAMU
1	04:22		70	4:29	TAMU	Mike Goodson 1-yard touchdown run, Richie Bean kick good	0	7
1	04:10		16	0:06	TAMU	Mike Goodson 16-yard touchdown run, Matt Szymanski kick good	0	14
2	11:06		65	2:53	PSU	Deon Butler 30-yard touchdown reception from Anthony Morelli, Kevin Kelly kick good	7	14
2	09:02		11	0:05	PSU	Daryll Clark 11-yard touchdown run, Kevin Kelly kick good	14	14
2	00:19		78	3:48	PSU	25-yard field goal by Kevin Kelly	17	14
3	03:57		78	8:45	TAMU	38-yard field goal by Matt Szymanski	17	17
3	00:19		84	3:31	PSU	Evan Royster 38-yard touchdown run, Kevin Kelly kick good	24	17
"TOP" = time of possession. For other American football terms, see Glossary of American football.							24	17
