= Jeremy Boone =

American football player (born 1986)

No. 41 – Penn State Nittany Lions
- Position: Punter
- Class: (redshirt) Senior

Personal information
- Born: September 15, 1986 (age 40)
- Listed height: 5 ft 9 in (1.75 m)
- Listed weight: 184 lb (83 kg)

Career information
- High school: Mechanicsburg Area Senior HS, (Mechanicsburg, Pennsylvania)
- College: Penn State (2005–2009)

Awards and highlights
- First-team All-Big Ten (2007); Second-team All-Big Ten (2009); Arthur Ashe Jr. Sports Scholar (2007)

Jeremy Allen Boone (born September 15, 1986) is a former collegiate American football punter for Penn State. He most recently was the starting punter for the Penn State Nittany Lions.

== Early life ==
Boone was a three-sport athlete at Mechanicsburg Area Senior High School in Mechanicsburg, Pennsylvania, playing football, baseball, and basketball. In addition to punting, he also played wide receiver and safety for the football team. In his senior season, he was named all-state as a punter, and was named to the all-conference teams in all three sports.

== College career ==
Arriving at Penn State as a walk-on, Boone redshirted his freshman season in 2005, and spent the 2006 season backing-up Ray Guy Award-finalist and future NFL punter, Jeremy Kapinos.

Boone became the starter in 2007, punting 59 times for an average of 43 yards-per-punt for the season—the third-best season for a punter in Penn State history. He led the conference in punting that season and named first-team All-Big Ten. He was also earned Academic All-Big Ten and Arthur Ashe Jr. Sports Scholars honors.

He began the 2008 season on the Athlon Sports and College Football News pre-season All-Big Ten lists. He would again average 43 yards-per-punt and lead the conference in punting, earning honorable mention All-Big Ten honors and was named an ESPN The Magazine CoSIDA Academic All-District and Academic All-Big Ten. Boone had 15 punts inside the 20 yard line in 2008, but only had 39 total kicks that season, which was too few to qualify for him national ranking. He was an inaugural recipient of a Big Ten Distinguished Scholar Award for the 2008-09 academic year.

Boone continued with strong performances in 2009. After 5 games, he led the Big Ten with a 48.8-yard average on 15 punts, with seven landing inside the 20 yard line. He led all conference punters by more than three yards per punt. These statistics would rank him #2 in the nation, but he did not meet the NCAA's 3.6 punts per game minimum to be considered. He was named Big Ten Special Teams Player of the Week following his performance in week 5 versus Illinois

== Personal ==
Boone is one of the Nittany Lions' most philanthropic members. He has participated in the Penn State IFC/Panhellenic Dance Marathon and in events for the Make-a-Wish Foundation, the Pennsylvania Special Olympics, and Habitat for Humanity International, among others. Boone is a member of Penn State's Student-Athlete Advisory Board and was selected to attend the 2009 NCAA National Student-Athlete Development Conference in Orlando, Florida. He earned a Bachelor of Arts in elementary education from Penn State in May 2009.
