= Daryll Clark =

American gridiron football player (born 1986)

No. 1
- Position: Quarterback

Personal information
- Born: February 5, 1986 (age 40); Youngstown, Ohio, U.S.
- Listed height: 6 ft 2 in (1.88 m)
- Listed weight: 235 lb (107 kg)

Career information
- High school: Ursuline (Youngstown); The Kiski School (Saltsburg, Pennsylvania)
- College: Penn State (2005–2009)
- NFL draft: 2010: undrafted

Career history
- Calgary Stampeders (2010); Omaha Nighthawks (2011)*; Chicago Rush (2011); Myrtle Beach Freedom (2016); Cape Fear Heroes (2017)
- * Offseason or practice squad member only

Awards and highlights
- Big Ten Most Valuable Player (2009); 2× First-team All-Big Ten (2008, 2009)

Daryll Lawrence Clark (born February 5, 1986) is an American former professional football quarterback. He was signed by the Calgary Stampeders of the Canadian Football League (CFL) as a free agent in 2010. He played collegiately for the Penn State Nittany Lions. From 2005 until 2009, Clark was the Nittany Lions' all-time passing touchdowns leader, as well as numerous other passing records. Clark was recruited to Penn State out of Ursuline High School in Youngstown by way of The Kiski School in Saltsburg, Pennsylvania. Clark was also a member of the Omaha Nighthawks, Chicago Rush, Myrtle Beach Freedom, and Cape Fear Heroes.

== College career ==
As a redshirt freshman, Clark appeared in five games during the 2006 season for the Penn State Nittany Lions. He completed 14 passes in 27 attempts for 116 yards and ran for 48 yards with 3 touchdowns as a backup to Anthony Morelli. He made his college football debut in a loss to Notre Dame, scoring on a five-yard run near the end of the game.

Clark saw more playing time as a sophomore in 2007, again as a back-up to Anthony Morelli. He completed 6 passes out of 9 attempts for 131 yards and ran for 78 yards and two touchdowns. Clark saw significant playing time in the 2007 Alamo Bowl versus the Texas A&M Aggies. Penn State trailed the Aggies 14-0 in the second quarter when Paterno sent him in the game in place of Morelli to provide an offensive spark. Clark responded by running for 50 yards on six carries and one touchdown. The game marked with debut of Penn State's new spread offense which replaced the traditional pocket passing- and tailback- oriented offense used by Penn State that season.

Clark was named the starting quarterback for the 2008 season after a highly publicized pre-season quarterback competition with redshirt sophomore Pat Devlin. Paterno cited Clark's game experience as a key factor in choosing him over Devlin. Clark's mobility allowed Penn State to continue development of its "Spread HD" offense. Clark's balanced, mistake-free performance throughout the first half of the season earned him the #6 spot on the Sporting News' list of the season's "Most Indispensable Players." At the conclusion of the season, Clark was granted extended eligibility from the NCAA after meeting certain academic benchmarks required of "partial qualifiers."

Clark was elected team captain by his teammates prior to the 2009 season.

At the end of the season Clark established many Penn State records for quarterbacks. He surpassed Todd Blackledge in career touchdown passes with a total of 43. Clark also became Penn State's single season leader in yards passed with 3,003 yards and the single season leader in touchdown passes with 24. His record as a starting quarterback is 22 wins and 4 losses. The losses were twice to the Iowa Hawkeyes, once to Ohio State and once to USC in the 2009 Rose Bowl.

=== Awards ===
Clark was twice named Big Ten Offensive Player of the Week during the 2008 season: October 11, for his three-touchdown game versus Wisconsin. and November 22, following his career-high 341-yard, four touchdown performance in the regular season finale against Michigan State. He is a semifinalist for the 2008 Maxwell and Davey O'Brien awards. The awards are given annually to the top collegiate football player and top quarterback, respectively. At season's end, he was named a consensus first team All-Big Ten selection.

Prior to the 2009 season, Clark was selected as one of 20 Johnny Unitas Golden Arm Award candidates and named to the Davey O'Brien Award watchlist. He earned Big Ten Offensive Player of the Week accolades twice that season: September 4 and October 24, following wins over Akron and Michigan, respectively. He was named first-team All-Big Ten after the 2009 season.

Clark was co-winner, with Michigan’s Brandon Graham, of the 2009 Chicago Tribune Silver Football, awarded by the Chicago Tribune to the college football player determined to be the Most Valuable Player of the Big Ten Conference. It was the first time two players have shared the award since its establishment in 1924. He also was named ECAC Player of the Year.

== Professional career ==
Pre-draft measurables
Height	Weight	Arm length	Hand span	40-yard dash	10-yard split	20-yard split	20-yard shuttle	Three-cone drill	Vertical jump	Broad jump	Bench press
6 ft 1 7/8 in (1.88 m)	235 lb (107 kg)	32 3/4 in (0.83 m)	9 1/2 in (0.24 m)	4.72 s	1.67 s	2.72 s	4.28 s	6.97 s	33.0 in (0.84 m)	9 ft 8 in (2.95 m)	21 reps
All values from NFL Combine/Pro Day

Daryll Clark went undrafted in the 2010 NFL draft. Clark was reportedly courted by the Minnesota Vikings, Green Bay Packers, St. Louis Rams and Pittsburgh Steelers, before ultimately signing with the Washington Redskins to a future contract. Clark attended the Redskins' training camp, but was not offered a contract.

Shortly after Washington's training camp, Clark signed with the Calgary Stampeders on July 23, 2010. The signing came already three games into the CFL season, and some speculated Clark would have a tough time earning a starting job over Calgary's other quarterbacks who were more familiar with the offense. On May 10, 2011, the Calgary Stampeders announced that they had released Clark after just one season, in which he did not attempt any passes.

Clark signed with the Omaha Nighthawks of the UFL for the 2011 season. He was released on September 2. On November 15, 2011, Clark signed with the Chicago Rush of the AFL.

In 2016, Clark began playing with the Myrtle Beach Freedom of American Indoor Football.

Clark signed with the Cape Fear Heroes in May 2017. He re-signed with the team in December 2017.

== Personal life ==
Clark earned a Bachelor of Arts in telecommunications from Penn State in 2008.
