= Tony Davis (cornerback) =

American gridiron football player (born 1986)

No. 11
- Position: Cornerback

Personal information
- Born: September 9, 1986 (age 40)
- Listed height: 5 ft 10 in (1.78 m)
- Listed weight: 195 lb (88 kg)

Career information
- High school: Warren (OH) Howland
- College: Penn State
- NFL draft: 2009: undrafted

Career history
- Arizona Cardinals (2009)*; Hamilton Tiger-Cats (2009)
- * Offseason or practice squad member only

Antonio West Davis (born September 9, 1986) is a former gridiron football cornerback. He was signed by the Arizona Cardinals as an undrafted free agent in 2009. He also spent time in 2009 with the Hamilton Tiger-Cats of the Canadian Football League (CFL). He played college football at Penn State.

== Early life ==
Davis had outstanding football career at Howland High School in Howland Township, Ohio, where he was named 1st-team All-State, Ohio Division II Co-Offensive Player-of-the-Year, and twice named All-Metro Athletic Conference.

== College career ==
Davis saw his first action as a sophomore, playing in 9 games during the 2005 season as the top reserve cornerback behind All-America and future pro, Alan Zemaitis. He started in every game at cornerback in 2006 and led the team (and was second in the Big Ten Conference) with 13 pass break-ups. He finished the season with 42 tackles, capping his season with an electrifying 88-yard fumble recovery and return for the game-winning touchdown in Penn State's 20-10 Outback Bowl victory over Tennessee.

Davis suffered several season injuries in 2007, including a mid-season appendicectomy. He appeared in 11 games at safety, recording 29 tackles, 2 forced fumbles, 2 pass break-ups, and an interception. Davis returned to cornerback for his senior season in 2008. He was the starter for all 13 games and earned honorable mention All-Big Ten accolades. He was presented with a special award from the State College Quarterback Club at the Nittany Lions's annual football banquet. He finished the season with 46 tackles, 5 pass break-ups, and an interception.

Davis earned a Bachelor of Science in Recreation, Parks and Tourism from Penn State in 2008.
