= Deon Butler =

American football player (born 1986)

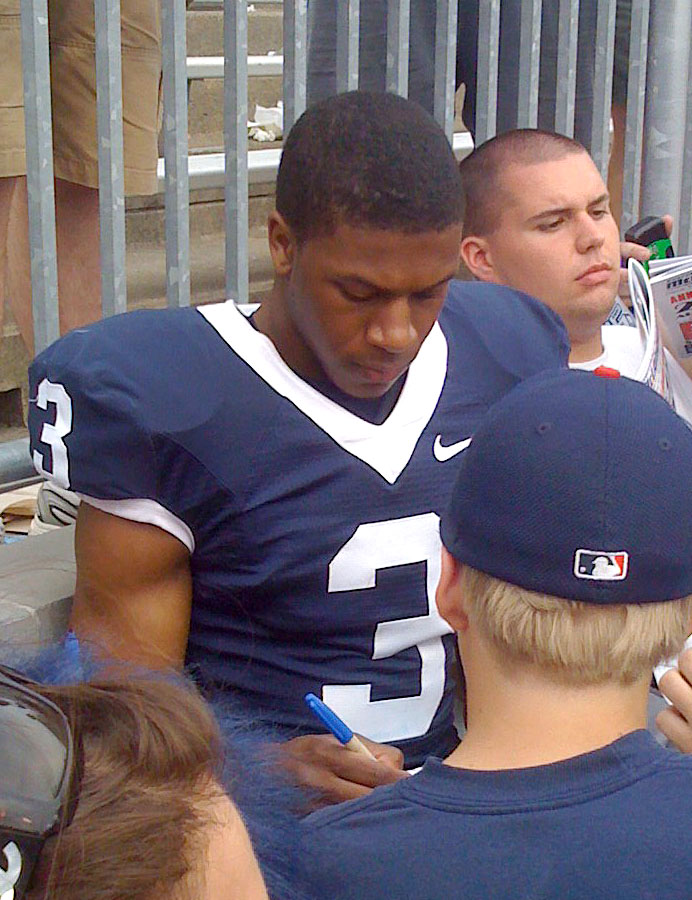
- Butler with the Penn State Nittany Lions in 2008

No. 11, 10
- Position: Wide Receiver

Personal information
- Born: January 4, 1986 (age 40); Fairfax, Virginia, U.S.
- Listed height: 5 ft 10 in (1.78 m)
- Listed weight: 182 lb (83 kg)

Career information
- High school: Hylton (Woodbridge, Virginia)
- College: Penn State
- NFL draft: 2009: 3rd round, 91st overall pick

Career history
- Seattle Seahawks (2009−2012); San Diego Chargers (2013)*
- * Offseason or practice squad member only

Awards and highlights
- Second-team All-Big Ten (2008); Freshman All-American (2005); Sporting News Freshman All-Big Ten (2005)

Career NFL statistics
- Receptions: 57
- Receiving yards: 611
- Receiving average: 10.7
- Receiving touchdowns: 4
- Stats at Pro Football Reference

Vincent Deon Butler (born January 4, 1986) is an American former professional football player who was a wide receiver in the National Football League (NFL). He was selected by the Seattle Seahawks in the third round of the 2009 NFL draft. He played college football for the Penn State Nittany Lions.

== Early life ==
Butler was born January 4, 1986, in Fairfax, Virginia. He played high school football at C.D. Hylton Senior High School in Woodbridge, Virginia.

== College career ==
After redshirting as a freshman at Penn State and without an athletic scholarship as a defensive back, Butler moved to the wide receiver position and rose to the top of the Penn State depth chart along with Derrick Williams, providing a solid deep threat for Penn State quarterbacks Michael Robinson and Anthony Morelli.

During his freshman season in 2006, Butler broke four school freshman records: season receptions (37), receiving yards in a game (125, versus Wisconsin), season yards (691), and touchdown catches (9). Butler holds the single-game receiving yards record with 216 yards on 11 receptions against Northwestern on September 30, 2006.

He finished 2007 with 47 receptions for 633 yards and 4 touchdowns. He had a season-high seven catches for 93 yards and a touchdown in Penn State's 38–7 blowout win over Wisconsin. In the 2008 season, Butler caught 47 passes for 810 yards and seven touchdowns. He caught eight passes for 105 yards against Michigan.

Butler was a record-setting receiver for Coach Joe Paterno's Nittany Lions, passing Bobby Engram to become Penn State's all-time receptions leader in November of his senior season against the Indiana Hoosiers.

== Professional career ==
Pre-draft measurables
Height	Weight	40-yard dash	10-yard split	20-yard split	20-yard shuttle	Three-cone drill	Vertical jump	Broad jump	Bench press
5 ft 11 in (1.80 m)	182 lb (83 kg)	4.31 s	1.47 s	2.50 s	4.23 s	7.01 s	34.5 in (0.88 m)	9 ft 10 in (3.00 m)	12 reps
All values from NFL Combine

=== Seattle Seahawks ===
The Seattle Seahawks traded up to select Butler in the third round (91st overall) of the 2009 NFL draft. They traded the Philadelphia Eagles a 5th- and 7th-round pick plus a 3rd-round pick in 2010 in order to position themselves to select Butler. The team's interest in Butler reportedly stemmed, in part, from conversations with Butler's college teammate, Aaron Maybin, during a pre-draft interview in Seattle. He signed a four-year, $3.2 million contract with the team on July 24, 2009. He received a $680,750 signing bonus.

He got his first receiving touchdown on September 12, 2010, against the San Francisco 49ers. It was his only catch of the game and it was for 13 yards. His second touchdown came against the Chicago Bears. After Deion Branch was traded to the New England Patriots Butler was named a starter, only to be replaced in the starting line-up several weeks later by teammate Ben Obomanu. He was put on injured reserve after breaking his leg during a touchdown catch against the 49ers in week 14.

Butler started the 2011 season on the Physically Unable to Perform list. He played in the final five games of the season.

Butler played in all four preseason games with the Seahawks in 2012, but was waived on August 31, 2012, as part of the final roster cuts from 75 to 53 players. On December 15, 2012, the Seahawks signed Butler after clearing a physical.

=== San Diego Chargers ===
Butler signed with the San Diego Chargers on April 8, 2013. On August 25, 2013, he was cut by the Chargers.

== Personal ==
Butler earned a Bachelor of Arts in Crime, Law & Justice from Penn State in 2008. He has mentioned being interested in a career in forensic science after football.

In the summer of 2008, Butler was an intern with the Philadelphia Police Department's Crime Scene Unit, where he observed several homicide crime scenes, and augmented his degree with field experience.
