= Josh Gaines =

American gridiron football player (born 1985)

No. 47
- Position: Defensive end

Personal information
- Born: September 27, 1985 (age 41); Fort Wayne, Indiana, U.S.
- Listed height: 6 ft 1 in (1.85 m)
- Listed weight: 275 lb (125 kg)

Career information
- High school: Fort Wayne (IN) Northrop
- College: Penn State
- NFL draft: 2009: undrafted

Career history
- Philadelphia Eagles (2009)*; Hamilton Tiger-Cats (2009−2010); Pittsburgh Power (2011)
- * Offseason or practice squad member only

Joshua Lamar Gaines (born September 27, 1985) is a former gridiron football defensive end. He was signed by the Philadelphia Eagles as an undrafted free agent in 2009. He played college football at Penn State.

Gaines has also been a member of the Hamilton Tiger-Cats.

== College career ==
Gaines played college football at Penn State. After redshirting his freshman year in 2004, he made appearances in every game in 2005, backing up future Kansas City Chief Tamba Hali. He would finish the season with 9 tackles and was named Academic All-Big Ten.

By the 2006 season, Gaines had moved into the starting rotation and remained the starter for the remainder of his time with the Nittany Lions. In 2007 Gaines helped lead the defense to a number two ranking in quarterback sacks and a seventh ranking in total defense. He was named a team captain for the Nittany Lions as a senior, and finished his career at Penn State with 105 tackles, 8.5 sacks and two fumble recoveries.

He earned a Bachelor of Science in Human Development and Family Studies from Penn State in 2008. He is a charter member of the Eta Alpha chapter of Iota Phi Theta fraternity.

== Professional career ==
=== Pre-draft ===
Gaines trained for the NFL Scouting Combine at Power Train Sports Performance in Millersville, Pennsylvania.

=== Philadelphia Eagles ===
Gaines was signed by the Philadelphia Eagles on April 27, 2009, as an undrafted free agent following the 2009 NFL draft. Gaines was a 2008 team captain at Penn State His interception return for a touchdown was the final play of the inaugural Flight Night, a live preseason inter-squad scrimmage held at Lincoln Financial Field on August 8, 2009. He was waived on September 5, 2009.

=== Hamilton Tiger-Cats ===
Gaines signed a practice roster agreement with the Hamilton Tiger-Cats on October 8, 2009. He was signed to the Tiger-Cats' active roster on May 27, 2010.

=== Pittsburgh Power ===
On October 19, 2010, Gaines signed with the Pittsburgh Power of the Arena Football League. He was placed on the Physically Unable to Perform list on March 5, 2011. He was then placed on Injured Reserve on March 9, 2011, where he stayed for the rest of the 2011 season.

== Personal ==
Gaines is one of 11 children: when he was six years old his mother, Wilma, and stepfather, James, adopted six children from an underprivileged home in their hometown of Fort Wayne, Indiana. In addition to James' biological daughter, LaShonda, and Wilma's two other biological children, Ebony and LaToya, the Holders also cared for a cousin, Kevin, who is autistic. Gaines credits his large family for his team-oriented approach to football and his strong leadership qualities.
