= Mark Rubin (American football) =

American football player (born 1985)

No. 33
- Position: Safety

Personal information
- Born: October 24, 1985 (age 41); Amherst, New York
- Listed height: 6 ft 4 in (1.93 m)
- Listed weight: 223 lb (101 kg)

Career information
- High school: Amherst Central High School (Buffalo, New York)
- College: Penn State
- NFL draft: 2009: undrafted

Career history
- St. Louis Rams (2009)

Awards and highlights
- First-team Academic All-American (2008)

Mark Harrison Rubin (born October 24, 1985) is an American former football safety. He was signed by the St. Louis Rams as an undrafted free agent in 2009. He played college football at Penn State.

== Early life ==
A four-year starter at wide receiver and safety at Amherst High School in Amherst, New York, Rubin finished his high school career as the holder of three NYSPHSAA Western New York Section records: receptions (167), receiving yardage (2,488), and touchdowns (34). He was a three-time all-state pick, a three-time All-Western New York selection and was a two-time Section VI Class A Offensive Player-of-the-Year. He was a two-year captain of the football team.

While a standout football player, Rubin was also an all-league lacrosse player, and a nationally ranked swimmer. He was a two-time state champion and an eight-time High School All-American. At age 14, he was the #1-ranked swimmer in the country in his age group in the 50 meter freestyle and 100 meter freestyle. He beat future Olympic gold medalist Michael Phelps in swimming events on several occasions. He defeated Olympic champion Ryan Lochte on a regular basis.

== College career ==
Rubin saw his first game action as a wide receiver in Penn State's 2004 Big Ten-opener at Wisconsin, making two receptions for 21 yards. He earned a starting job the next week at Minnesota, making a season-high six catches for 60 yards. He started 6 of the final 7 games, totaling 16 receptions for 187 yards for the season. Rubin dislocated his ankle in an August 2005 practice, and redshirted the 2005 season. He began the 2006 season at safety, but was troubled by a broken collarbone and played sparingly. He was switched back to wide receiver in time for Penn State's game against Temple and saw limited action the rest of the season.

In 2007, Rubin played in every game on both defense and special teams and earned the starting safety job the last five games. He ended the season with 32 tackles (17 solo), with one tackle for loss. Rubin had 8 tackles in the Nittany Lions' 24-17 Alamo Bowl victory over Texas A&M, helping hold the Aggies to 3 points over the final 49 minutes.

Rubin became the Nittany Lions' full-time starter in 2008. He made his first interception September 6, versus Oregon State. Rubin's best game came during Penn State's much-anticipated nationally televised showdown with Ohio State. With Penn State trailing by three points with 10:38 to play, Rubin's tackle of Buckeyes quarterback Terrelle Pryor forced a momentum-changing fumble which was recovered by linebacker NaVorro Bowman. The play was voted the week's Pontiac Game Changing Performance with an overwhelming 53 percent of the total votes, Rubin led the defense with a career-high 11 tackles in the victory, and was named the Walter Camp Football Foundation National Defensive Player of the Week and Big Ten Defensive Player of the Week. He ended the season with 60 tackles (30 solo), with one tackle for loss, two interceptions and one forced fumble.

Overall, Rubin started 24 career games at Penn State.

Pre-draft measurables
Height	Weight	40-yard dash	10-yard split	20-yard split	20-yard shuttle	Three-cone drill	Vertical jump	Broad jump	Bench press	Wonderlic
6 ft 3 1/4 in (1.91 m)	222 lb (101 kg)	4.59 s	1.58 s	2.67 s	4.26 s	6.85 s	32 in (0.81 m)	9 ft 7 in (2.92 m)	17 reps	35
All values from NFL Combine.

=== Academic ===
Rubin completed dual majors in August 2008, earning a Bachelor of Science in finance and a Bachelor of Arts in public relations, while graduating with a 3.80 GPA. He was accepted by Penn State’s graduate school as an MBA candidate that fall. He was named an Academic All-Big Ten honoree (2006, 2007, 2008) three times and was named First-team Academic All-American in 2008.

== Professional career ==
He was signed as a free agent out of Penn State immediately following the 2009 NFL draft. He was waived June 30. Re-signed on August 10. Waived again on September 5.

== Post-football ==
Rubin has continued his athletic success even while in the business world at Barclays on their fixed income futures sales desk. On July 29, 2012, he competed in the Wall Street Decathlon and captured first place earning the title "Wall Street's Best Athlete". The event consisted of more than 120 traders, bankers and financial advisers who racked up points for their performance in 10 events — the 40-yard dash, 400- and 800-yard runs, bench press, agility drill, vertical leap, rowing, dips, pull-ups, and football toss.

Rubin would successfully defend his title at The D10 decathlon events in 2013, 2014, 2015 and 2016.
