= Sean Lee =

American football player (born 1986)

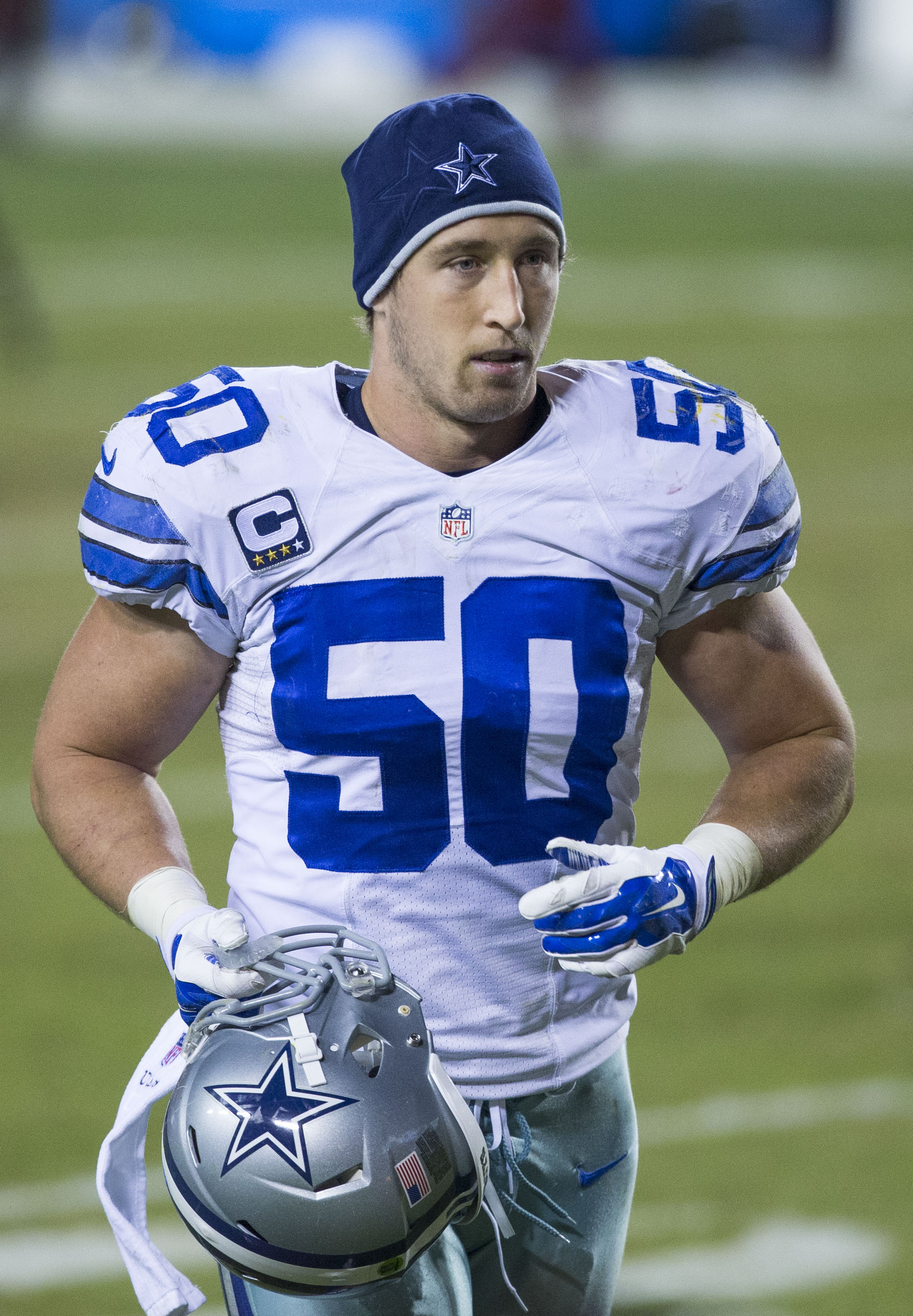
- Lee with the Dallas Cowboys in 2015

No. 50
- Position: Linebacker

Personal information
- Born: July 22, 1986 (age 40); Pittsburgh, Pennsylvania, U.S.
- Listed height: 6 ft 2 in (1.88 m)
- Listed weight: 245 lb (111 kg)

Career information
- High school: Upper St. Clair (Upper St. Clair Township, Pennsylvania)
- College: Penn State (2005–2009)
- NFL draft: 2010: 2nd round, 55th overall pick

Career history
- Dallas Cowboys (2010–2020)

Awards and highlights
- First-team All-Pro (2016); 2× Pro Bowl (2015, 2016); 2× Second-team All-Big Ten (2007, 2009)

Career NFL statistics
- Total tackles: 747
- Sacks: 4.0
- Forced fumbles: 2
- Fumble recoveries: 4
- Interceptions: 14
- Pass deflections: 30
- Defensive touchdowns: 2
- Stats at Pro Football Reference

Sean Patrick Lee (born July 22, 1986) is an American former professional football player who was a linebacker in the National Football League (NFL). Nicknamed “the General”, he played college football for the Penn State Nittany Lions and was selected by the Cowboys in the second round of the 2010 NFL draft. He made two Pro Bowls and the 2016 All-Pro Team.

== Early life ==
He is the son of Craig Lee and Geralyn Lee of Upper St. Clair Township, Pennsylvania. Lee's older brother Conor was the placekicker for the University of Pittsburgh and his sister Alexandra was a student athlete at Upper St. Clair High School. Sean is also a grandson of Federal Judge Donald J. Lee of the United States District Court for the Western District of Pennsylvania.

Lee was a multisport star at Upper St. Clair High School outside Pittsburgh; he was a three-year starter at point guard in basketball, averaging 21.2 points, 9.1 rebounds, and 3.2 assists as a senior, and won a district title. In football, Lee rushed for 1,240 yards and 21 touchdowns while registering 95 tackles and four interceptions as a safety for an 11-1 squad his senior year.

== College career ==
After graduating from Upper St. Clair High Schoo] in Upper St. Clair Township, Pennsylvania, Lee went on to play college football at Penn State. Heading into 2008, Lee was a starting outside linebacker for coach Joe Paterno's Nittany Lions for two consecutive seasons. In his junior year, he was second team all-Big Ten, finishing second on the team in tackles with 138. He had a season-high 17 tackles versus Illinois, and registered more than 10 tackles in all but three games. He also had two interceptions and three forced fumbles on the season.

In April 2008, Lee tore the anterior cruciate ligament in his right knee during a noncontact drill at spring practice. Despite being forced to take a medical redshirt for the 2008 season, Lee's teammates elected him a team captain that season. While rehabilitating, he opted to serve as an undergraduate assistant coach, participating in every practice and wearing a headset on the sidelines during games that season.

Lee's teammates again elected him team captain prior to the 2009 season.

=== College awards and honors ===
- 2010 Capital One Bowl champion
- 2009 Penn State Nittany Lions football team Captain
- 2007 Alamo Bowl champion
- 2007 Alamo Bowl Defensive MVP
- 2007 Pro Football Weekly All-American
- He was named Big Ten Defensive Player of the Week after his effort in the Florida International game on September 1, 2007, and again following Penn State's 31–6 victory over Temple on September 19, 2009.
- He was named Big Ten co-Defensive Player of the Week with Ohio State's James Laurinaitis following his efforts in the Purdue game on November 3, 2007.

== Professional career ==
Pre-draft measurables
Height	Weight	Arm length	Hand span	40-yard dash	10-yard split	20-yard split	20-yard shuttle	Three-cone drill	Vertical jump	Broad jump	Bench press
6 ft 2 1/8 in (1.88 m)	236 lb (107 kg)	32 in (0.81 m)	8 3/4 in (0.22 m)	4.71 s	1.66 s	2.77 s	4.16 s	6.89 s	37.5 in (0.95 m)	10 ft 0 in (3.05 m)	24 reps
All values from NFL Combine/[Penn State's Pro Day

=== 2010 season ===
The Dallas Cowboys selected Lee in the second round (55th overall) of the 2010 NFL draft. The Cowboys traded their second-round (59th overall) and their fourth-round picks (125th overall) in the 2010 NFL Draft to the Philadelphia Eagles to move up from to 55th overall in the second round to select Lee. His considerable fall from the first round was thought to be due to his history of injuries, which included a torn ACL on the right knee and partially torn ACL on the left knee during his last two seasons at Penn State, and throughout his career, injuries had indeed prevented Lee from playing a full season's slate of NFL games. Lee was the fourth linebacker selected in the draft.

On June 23, 2010, the Cowboys signed Lee to a four-year, $3.49 million contract that included $1.71 million guaranteed and a signing bonus of $1.20 million. He was bothered by nagging injuries in training camp; consequently, he failed to see a lot of action on the field.

Lee earned NFL Defensive Player of the Week and Pepsi NFL Rookie of the Week honors for his week-14 performance versus Peyton Manning and the Indianapolis Colts, in which he recorded the first two interceptions of his NFL career, including one he returned for a touchdown and one in overtime to set up the game-winning field goal.

=== 2011 season ===
Promoted to starting inside linebacker in 2011, Lee thrived immediately in new defensive coordinator Rob Ryan's scheme. In the opening game versus the New York Jets, Lee intercepted Mark Sanchez to record the third interception of his career. His key interception of Rex Grossman and fumble recovery in the final minute of the Cowboys' Monday Night Football game versus the Washington Redskins were crucial in their 18-16 comeback.

By Week 3, Lee had a team-leading 36 tackles, two interceptions, two fumble recoveries, a tackle for a loss, and three pass breakups, earning him NFC Defensive Player of the Month honors. He was the first Cowboys player in franchise history to win the award.

In the seventh game of the 2011 season against the Philadelphia Eagles at Lincoln Field, Lee suffered a dislocated left wrist in the first quarter when he hit his hand against Michael Vick's helmet, but opted against having season-ending surgery. After seven games, Lee led the team in total tackles with 51, 15 more than the next leading tackler, Gerald Sensabaugh. He also ranked first on the team with three interceptions, the only player on the team through the first seven games with more than one interception. In the eighth game of the season, Lee was inactive due to the wrist injury he had sustained the previous week.

=== 2012 season ===
Lee ended up having a breakout season, becoming one of the defensive leaders, leading the team with 131 tackles and tying for the team lead in interceptions (four) and tackles for loss (eight). He also became only the second linebacker ever to have intercepted both Tom Brady and Peyton Manning. He had an excellent game against the New York Giants with 10 tackles, two assists, and a forced fumble on David Wilson. He also registered 14 tackles against the Seattle Seahawks in the second game of the season, tying him with Lee Roy Jordan for the 41-year-old team record for most tackles in a game. Against the Carolina Panthers, Lee injured his right big toe and was placed on injured reserve.

=== 2013 season ===
On August 24, 2013, the Dallas Cowboys signed Lee to a six-year, $42 million contract extension that included $16.13 million guaranteed and a signing bonus of $10 million.

During week 4 against the San Diego Chargers, Lee had 18 tackles and returned an interception 52 yards for his second NFL touchdown. During October, Lee led the Cowboys with 52 tackles (three for loss) and three interceptions. One of his interceptions against the Detroit Lions in week 8 included a career-high 74-yard return. His strong performances earned him NFC Defensive Player of the Month.

=== 2014 season ===
On May 27, Lee tore his ACL for the third time in his career after being blocked to the ground by rookie offensive lineman Zack Martin during an organized team activity (OTA). Some controversy arose about the injury because OTAs are supposed to be noncontact. On July 2, he was placed on the injured reserve list and was replaced by Rolando McClain.

=== 2015 season ===
After the emergence of Rolando McClain at middle linebacker the previous year, Lee was moved to weakside linebacker to protect him from direct hits by the offensive line and take advantage of his playmaking abilities. In the second game against the Philadelphia Eagles, he had 16 tackles (two for loss), two passes defensed, an interception in the end zone, and sealed the 20–10 win with an onside kick recovery, although he also suffered a concussion. His performance earned him NFC Defensive Player of the Week. On December 7 against the Washington Redskins, he posted 13 tackles, two tackles for loss, and one sack.

Lee finished with 128 tackles (led the team), 2.5 sacks, 11 tackles for loss (led the team), six quarterback pressures, one interception, and five passes defended. He appeared in 14 games, missing one contest because of a hamstring injury and the other because of a concussion. Lee was named to the Pro Bowl as an injury replacement for Kansas City Chiefs linebacker Justin Houston.

=== 2016 season ===
Lee helped lead the Cowboys defense to a 13-3 record in 2016. He was second only to Bobby Wagner in tackles and was named First-team All-Pro as a linebacker for the first time in his career. He was named to his second straight Pro Bowl as an injury replacement for Carolina Panthers linebacker Luke Kuechly.

Lee was ranked 79th on the NFL Top 100 Players of 2017.

=== 2017 season ===
Lee finished the 2017 season with 100 tackles.

=== 2018 season ===
Lee finished the 2018 season with 30 tackles and a 1/2 sack.

=== 2019 season ===
On February 13, 2019, Lee announced that he planned on returning for his ninth season. In week 15 against the Los Angeles Rams, Lee sacked Jared Goff once and intercepted a pass thrown by Goff during the 44–21 win. In week 16 against the Philadelphia Eagles, Lee recorded a team-high 17 tackles during the 17–9 loss.

=== 2020 season ===
On March 24, 2020, Lee resigned with the Cowboys on a one-year deal worth $4.5 million, with $2 million fully guaranteed. He was placed on injured reserve on September 7, 2020. On September 16, Lee was revealed to have undergone a sports hernia surgery, requiring at least six weeks to recover. He was activated on October 31 and finished the season with 20 tackles in nine games.

On April 26, 2021, Lee announced his retirement. At the time of his retirement, Lee was the last active Cowboy who had played under head coach Wade Phillips.

== NFL career statistics ==
Season				Tackles				Fumbles				Interceptions					
Year	Team	GP	GS	Comb	Solo	Asst.	Sack	FF	FR	Yds	TD	Int	Yds	Avg	Lng	TD	PD
2010	DAL	14	0	25	20	5	0.0	1	0	0	1	2	44	22.0	31	1	2
2011	DAL	15	15	103	69	34	0.0	0	1	0	0	4	87	21.8	37	0	7
2012	DAL	6	6	57	36	21	0.0	1	0	0	0	1	0	0.0	0	0	3
2013	DAL	11	11	99	68	31	0.0	0	1	10	1	4	174	43.5	74	1	6
2014	DAL	Did not play due to injury															
2015	DAL	14	14	128	76	52	2.5	0	0	0	0	1	0	0.0	0	0	5
2016	DAL	15	15	145	93	52	0.0	0	1	0	0	0	0	0.0	0	0	1
2017	DAL	11	11	101	70	31	0	0	0	0	0	1	9	9.0	9	0	1
2018	DAL	7	5	30	15	15	0.5	0	1	0	0	0	0	0	0	0	1
2019	DAL	16	13	86	55	31	1.0	0	0	0	0	1	25	25.0	25	0	4
2020	DAL	9	2	20	11	9	0	0	0	0	0	0	0	0	0	0	0
Career		118	92	802	521	281	4.0	2	4	10	2	14	339	24.2	74	2	30
