= Justin King (American football) =

American football player (born 1987)

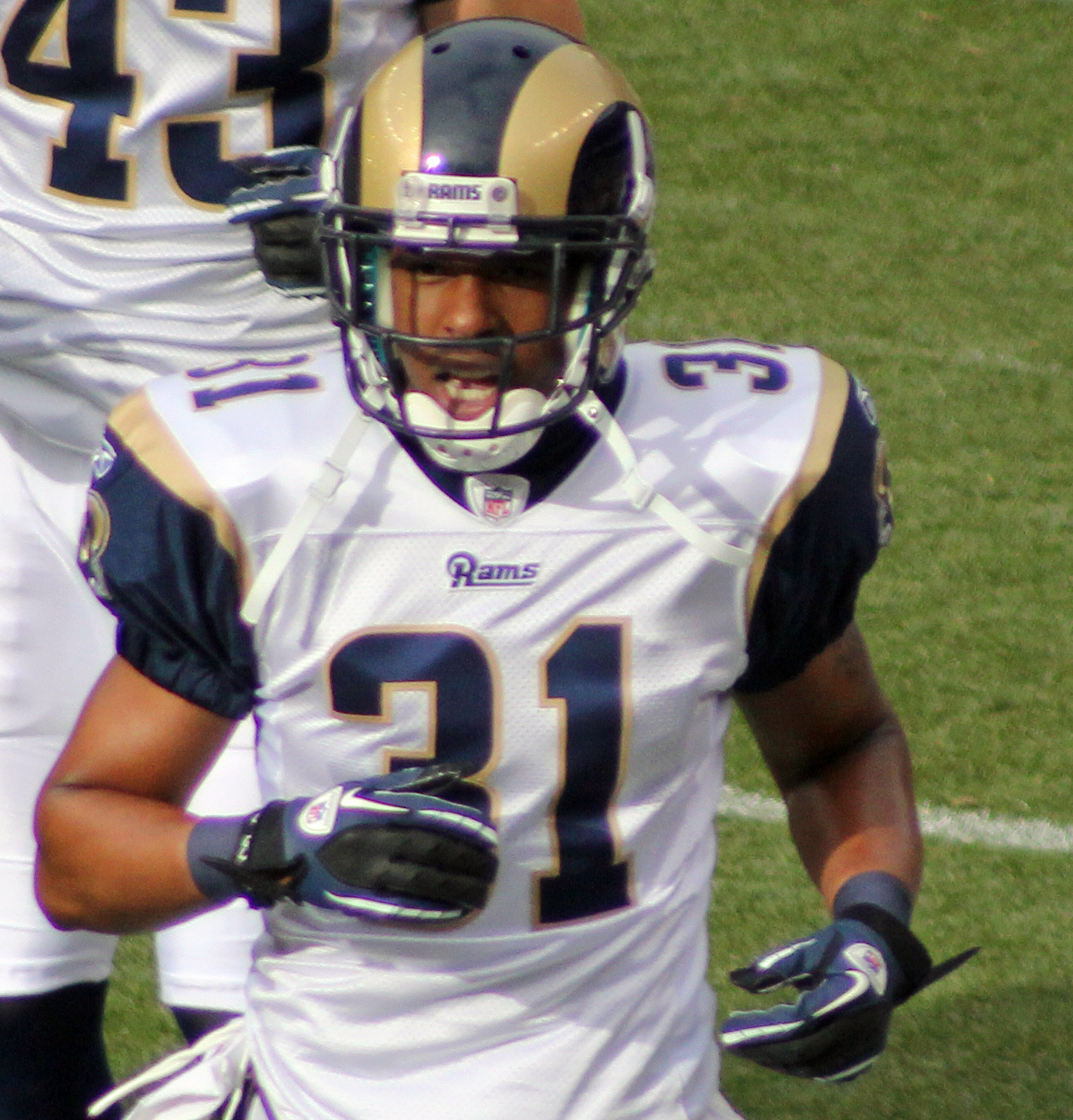
- King with the St. Louis Rams in 2010

No. 21, 31
- Position: Cornerback

Personal information
- Born: May 11, 1987 (age 39); Pittsburgh, Pennsylvania, U.S.
- Listed height: 5 ft 11 in (1.80 m)
- Listed weight: 185 lb (84 kg)

Career information
- High school: Gateway (Monroeville, Pennsylvania)
- College: Penn State
- NFL draft: 2008: 4th round, 101st overall pick

Career history
- St. Louis Rams (2008−2011); Indianapolis Colts (2012); Pittsburgh Steelers (2012)

Awards and highlights
- First-team All-Big Ten (2007); Second-team All-Big Ten (2006)

Career NFL statistics
- Total tackles: 116
- Sacks: 1
- Forced fumbles: 1
- Fumble recoveries: 1
- Interceptions: 1
- Stats at Pro Football Reference

Justin Thomas King (born May 11, 1987) is an American former professional football player who was a cornerback in the National Football League (NFL). King was selected by the St. Louis Rams in the fourth round of the 2008 NFL draft. He played college football for the Penn State Nittany Lions.

== Early life ==
King was a highly rated high school football recruit playing football for Gateway High School in Monroeville, Pennsylvania. King was the Gatorade Pennsylvania player of the year as a senior. He was rated as highly as the top cornerback recruit in the country in 2004, and the top football recruit in the state of Pennsylvania. He played in the 2005 U.S. Army All-American Bowl with fellow Nittany Lion Derrick Williams. King's stepfather, Terry Smith, was a receiver for Penn State from 1988 to 1991, and is currently the interim head Penn State football coach replacing James Franklin. He was also an accomplished sprinter on the track and field team for two years.

== College career ==
King arrived at Pennsylvania State University as one of the most highly touted prospects of that season. He made an immediate impact as a true freshman, playing on both offense and defense in 2005. That season, he averaged 12.6 yards per rushing attempt, racking up 277 yards on 18 carries.

By 2006, he was the team's starting cornerback, playing all thirteen games. His first career interception came versus Ohio State and snapped eventual Heisman Trophy winner Troy Smith's streak of 153 attempts without an interception. King was named second-team All-Big Ten by the conference coaches that season, and was named to the 2006 Academic All-Big Ten team.

Following his junior season, King declared himself eligible for the 2008 NFL draft, forgoing one year of college eligibility. King, an academic All-Big Ten selection, finished his degree in Letters, Arts, and Sciences in two and a half years.

== Professional career ==
=== Pre-draft ===
Despite questions over King's decision to declare himself eligible for the 2008 NFL draft following his junior season, King made a strong showing at the NFL Scouting Combine. His 4.31-second time in the 40-yard dash was the fastest time for a defensive back, and second-fastest of all prospects, second only to running back Chris Johnson of East Carolina.

Pre-draft measurables
Height	Weight	40-yard dash	10-yard split	20-yard split	20-yard shuttle	Three-cone drill	Vertical jump	Broad jump	Bench press	Wonderlic
5 ft 10 7/8 in (1.80 m)	192 lb (87 kg)	4.31 s	1.40 s	2.46 s	4.31 s	6.91 s	37 1/2 in (0.95 m)	9 ft 7 in (2.92 m)	14 reps	24
3-cone and vertical from Penn State Pro Day, all others from NFL Combine.

=== St. Louis Rams ===
King was selected by the St. Louis Rams in the fourth round of the 2008 NFL draft with the 101st overall pick. He signed a three-year $1.52 million contract that included a $376,000 signing bonus.

King suffered a torn ligament in his big toe in the first preseason game versus the Tennessee Titans on August 8, an injury that would keep him out for the entirety of his rookie season.

=== Indianapolis Colts ===
On June 8, 2012, King was signed by the Indianapolis Colts. The Colts released King from their roster following their Week 5 win against the Packers.

=== Pittsburgh Steelers ===
On December 18, 2012, King was signed by the Pittsburgh Steelers. On June 6, 2013, King was placed on the injured reserve list. On July 2, 2013, he was released by the Steelers.

== NFL career statistics ==
Legend
**Bold**	Career high

Year	Team	Games		Tackles					Interceptions					Fumbles			
Year	Team	GP	GS	Cmb	Solo	Ast	Sck	TFL	Int	Yds	TD	Lng	PD	FF	FR	Yds	TD
2009	STL	**15**	7	36	33	3	0.0	0	0	0	0	0	2	0	**1**	0	0
2010	STL	8	0	19	18	1	0.0	3	0	0	0	0	2	0	0	0	0
2011	STL	12	**12**	**58**	**47**	**11**	**1.0**	**4**	**1**	**51**	0	**51**	**5**	**1**	0	0	0
2012	IND	3	0	3	1	2	0.0	0	0	0	0	0	2	0	0	0	0
		38	19	116	99	17	1.0	7	1	51	0	51	11	1	1	0	0
