= Rodney Kinlaw =

American gridiron football player (born 1985)

No. 20
- Position: Running back

Personal information
- Born: April 6, 1985 (age 41); Bonneau, South Carolina, U.S.
- Listed height: 5 ft 9 in (1.75 m)
- Listed weight: 225 lb (102 kg)

Career information
- High school: Goose Creek (SC) Stratford
- College: Penn State
- NFL draft: 2008: undrafted

Career history
- New York Jets (2008)*; Winnipeg Blue Bombers (2009)*; Edmonton Eskimos (2009); Omaha Beef (2009–2010); Mönchengladbach Mavericks (2011)
- * Offseason or practice squad member only

Awards and highlights
- Alamo Bowl MVP (2007)
- Stats at CFL.ca (archive)

Rodney Eddrick Kinlaw (born April 6, 1985) is an American former professional football running back. He played for the Edmonton Eskimos of the Canadian Football League, the Omaha Beef of the Indoor Football League, and the Mönchengladbach Mavericks of the German Football League. He was signed by the New York Jets as an undrafted free agent in 2008, out of Penn State.

== Early life ==
Kinlaw was a standout running back at Stratford High School in Goose Creek, South Carolina, where he amassed 1,783 yards and 30 touchdowns as a senior. Kinlaw was named Offensive Back-of-the-Year by the Charleston Post and Courier and Palmetto Touchdown Club. He was named an All-American by SuperPrep and was a finalist for South Carolina's Mr. Football and was named Associated Press first-team all-state.

== College career ==
Kinlaw, who at one time was considered to be the third best of the three tailbacks in the Nittany Lions' 2003 recruiting class, spent most of his career at Penn State on the depth chart behind Tony Hunt and Austin Scott while nursing a serious ACL injury. He did not see significant playing time until week five of his senior season (2007). Kinlaw's career-best performance came versus Temple that year when he rushed for 168-yards on 27 carries, the most since previous Penn State running back Larry Johnson who had 271 yards rushing in a single game. Solid performances the second half of the 2007 season saw him become the 11th running back in Penn State history to reach 1,000 yards in a season ending with 1,329 yards rushing and 123 yards receiving.

His convincing 143-yard performance in the 2007 Alamo Bowl earned him recognition as the game's offensive MVP.

== Professional career ==
=== New York Jets ===
On August 1, 2008, the New York Jets announced they signed Kinlaw as an undrafted free agent. He was later released on August 26 during the preseason.

=== Winnipeg Blue Bombers ===
Kinlaw was signed by the Winnipeg Blue Bombers of the Canadian Football League on February 9, 2009.

However, on April 3, 2009, Kinlaw was released.

=== Edmonton Eskimos ===
Kinlaw signed with the Edmonton Eskimos practice roster on August 26, 2009.

=== Omaha Beef ===
Kinlaw signed with the Omaha Beef of the Indoor Football League on December 31, 2009.

=== Mönchengladbach Mavericks ===
The Mönchengladbach Mavericks signed Kinlaw to play in the German Football League for the 2011 season.

== Personal ==
Kinlaw is the nephew of former Penn State All-American Courtney Brown, who was the No. 1 overall pick by the Cleveland Browns in the 2000 NFL draft.

Kinlaw earned his Bachelor of Arts in Labor and Industrial Relations in May 2007. He is working on a second degree, in Sociology.
