= Tyrell Sales =

American football player (born 1986)

No. 11
- Position: Linebacker

Personal information
- Born: January 1, 1986 (age 40); Butler, Pennsylvania, U.S.
- Listed height: 6 ft 2 in (1.88 m)
- Listed weight: 234 lb (106 kg)

Career information
- College: Penn State
- NFL draft: 2009: undrafted

Career history
- Indianapolis Colts (2009)*; Montreal Alouettes (2010); Jacksonville Sharks (2011); Parma Panthers (2012)
- * Offseason or practice squad member only

Tyrell Sales (born January 1, 1986) is an American former professional football player. He played in 2012 for the Parma Panthers, a team based in Parma, Italy, that played in the top level of the Italian Football League.

Sales played college football as a linebacker for the Penn State Nittany Lions. He was signed as a free agent by the AFL's Jacksonville Sharks in 2010. He also had a workout for the Indianapolis Colts, but did not make the team. He is a charter member of the Eta Alpha chapter of Iota Phi Theta fraternity. Sales was inducted into the Butler County Sports Hall of Fame in 2020.
