= Bill Kenney (American football coach) =

American football coach

Biographical details
- Born: Randolph, Massachusetts, U.S.

Playing career
- 1978–1981: Norwich
- Positions: Tight end, fullback

Coaching career (HC unless noted)
- 1982: Norwich (OB)
- 1983–1984: Dennis-Yarmouth HS (MA) (asst.)
- 1985: Lincoln HS (NE) (asst.)
- 1986–1987: Nebraska (GA)
- 1988: Penn State (GA)
- 1989–1991: Penn State (OL)
- 1992–1995: Penn State (RC)
- 1993–1999: Penn State (OL)
- 2000–2011: Penn State (OT/TE)
- 2013–2016: Western Michigan (OT/TE)
- 2017–2019: Western Michigan (AHC/TE)
- 2020–2022: Western Michigan (OL/RC)

Bill Kenney is an American football coach who last served as the offensive line coach at Western Michigan University. Prior to working at Western Michigan, Kenney coached for over two decades under Joe Paterno for the Penn State Nittany Lions and was a graduate assistant for the Nebraska Cornhuskers. He played collegiate football at Norwich University.

== Playing career ==
Kenney attended Norwich University, where he played football as a tight end and fullback. At Norwich, he was a three-year starter and, during his senior season in 1981, was the co-captain of the squad.

== Coaching career ==
The year after his playing career ended, he remained at his alma mater and served as the offensive backfield coach in 1982. For the next three years, he served as an assistant coach at two high schools: Dennis-Yarmouth Regional High School and Lincoln High School. He then moved back to the college level where, from 1986 to 1987 he served as a graduate assistant at the University of Nebraska. In 1988, he went to Penn State, where he would work for the next 23 years, as a graduate assistant. While at Penn State, he served in a variety of positions including offensive line coach, recruiting coordinator, and offensive tackles/tight ends coach. When new coach Bill O'Brien was hired in 2012, Kenney was not retained. After not coaching during the 2012 season, he was hired on February 26, 2013, to serve as the offensive line coach at Western Michigan. During his coaching career, Kenney has coached 8 All-Big Ten honorees, 6 All-Americans, 10 Academic All-Americans and 47 Academic All-Big Ten honorees.

== Personal life ==
Kenney is a native of Randolph, Massachusetts. He is married to Kathryn, with whom he has had three children.
