= College Football News =

Magazine and website on college football

- Website type: Sports news
- Available in: English
- Owners: CBS Interactive (2007–present); Independent (1998–2007)
- Creator: Pete Fiutak (founder)
- Website: collegefootballnews.com
- Commercial: Yes
- Registration: Optional
- Launched: 1998; 28 years ago
- Current status: Active

College Football News (CFN) is a magazine and website published by College Football News, Inc., headquartered in Chicago, Illinois. News coverage includes scores, statistics, rankings, and reports on college football games. Analysis includes comparisons between teams, predictions of game outcomes and high-school recruiting information. They also give awards to players in various categories.

The website has fan discussion boards on topics relating to college football. Content from College Football News is used on partner sites, such as that of Fox Sports, and by independent organizations, such as the National Football League.

In the summer of 2006, the College Football News website joined the Scout.com Network. However, they maintain separate editorial selections of All-America teams.
