= Anthony Morelli =

American football player (born 1985)

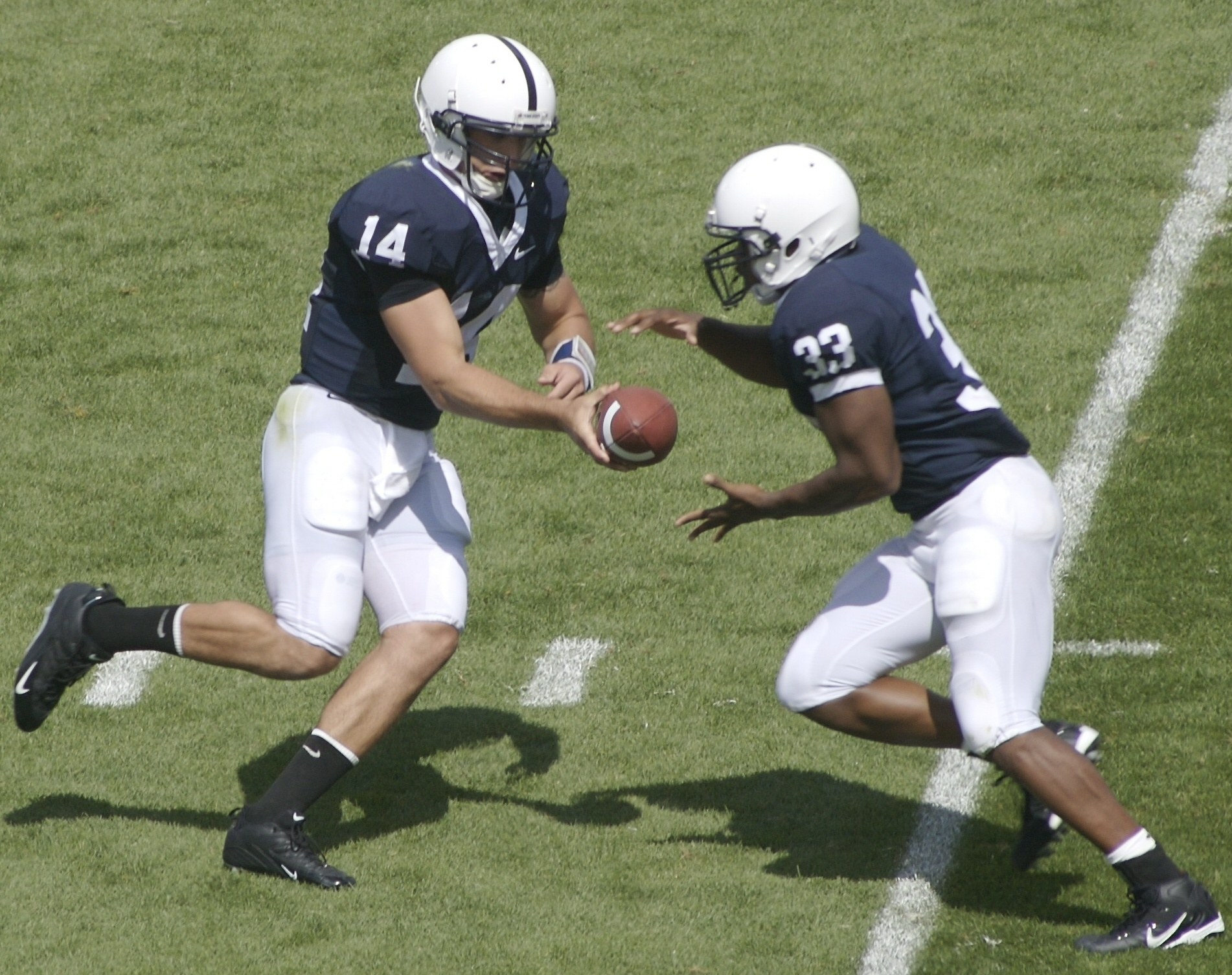
- Morelli (left) hands off to Austin Scott at Penn State

No. 12, 9
- Position: Quarterback

Personal information
- Born: June 21, 1985 (age 41); Pittsburgh, Pennsylvania, U.S.
- Listed height: 6 ft 4 in (1.93 m)
- Listed weight: 231 lb (105 kg)

Career information
- High school: Penn Hills (Pittsburgh)
- College: Penn State
- NFL draft: 2008: undrafted

Career history
- Arizona Cardinals (2008)*; San Jose SaberCats (2009)*; Milwaukee Iron (2010)*; Omaha Nighthawks (2010)*; Pittsburgh Power (2011)
- * Offseason or practice squad member only

Career AFL statistics
- TD–INT: 14-4
- Passing yards: 824
- Passer rating: 92.01
- Stats at ArenaFan.com

Anthony Michael Morelli (born June 21, 1985) is an American former professional football player who was a quarterback in the Arena Football League (AFL). He played college football for the Penn State Nittany Lions under coach Joe Paterno. He was signed by the Arizona Cardinals of the National Football League (NFL) as an undrafted free agent in 2008.

Morelli was a member of the AFL's San Jose SaberCats, Milwaukee Iron, Omaha Nighthawks and Pittsburgh Power.

== Early life ==
As a 10-year-old, Morelli won the National Football League's 1995 Punt, Pass, and Kick competition, throwing a 50-yard pass in front of his hometown crowd at Pittsburgh's Three Rivers Stadium.

In his high school years, Morelli was selected to the ESPN RISE Elite 11.

== College career ==
Morelli originally committed to the University of Pittsburgh in August 2003, but de-committed due to Pitt's existing situation with Tyler Palko, along with the recent move of Miami, Virginia Tech, and Boston College out of the Big East, and chose Penn State instead.

Morelli's junior year at Penn State got off to a good start. He threw a 42-yard touchdown on his first pass as the Nittany Lion's starting quarterback in a 34–16 win over the University of Akron. However, he struggled after that, particularly in a 28–6 loss to rival Ohio State. With the Lions down 14–6, Morelli threw two late interceptions that Ohio State returned for touchdowns, effectively ending any hopes of a comeback and making the game look a lot more lopsided than it was. Morelli finished the game with only 106 yards passing. As a result of this performance, Morelli's play had become a polarizing issue amongst Nittany Lion fans. Some fans wanted to bring in backup Daryll Clark, a redshirt freshman whose style of play resembled that of Morelli's predecessor and former Heisman hopeful, Michael Robinson. Other fans have come to Morelli's defense, pointing out the amount of playing time typically required to develop good quarterbacks. By season's end, Morelli had thrown for 2,424 yards, 11 touchdowns and 8 interceptions. He took over third place on Penn State's season passing yardage list, trailing only Kerry Collins (1994) and Tony Sacca (1991). Despite his relatively decent statistics, Morelli expressed frustration over the conservative nature of Penn State's play calling in a November 2006 interview with the Pittsburgh Tribune-Review. After struggling all season, Morelli was able to redeem himself during the 2007 Outback Bowl against Tennessee, leading the Nittany Lions to an upset victory.

Morelli's senior season began with a dominant victory over rival Notre Dame but quickly lost momentum with ineffectual campaigns at rival Michigan and at Illinois highlighted by his tendency to turn the ball over in critical situations. Morelli then led Penn State to blowout wins over Iowa and Wisconsin and a close road win against Indiana, but Morelli struggled against rival Ohio State and was unable to rally Penn State to victory over Big Ten rival Michigan State in the closing minutes of the game.

=== Controversy ===
Morelli revealed that he has not spoken with high school coach Neil Gordon since his final game in 2003. He accused Gordon and his staff of sabotaging his college recruitment, spreading rumors about his intelligence and his inability to read defenses.

== Professional career ==
=== Arizona Cardinals ===
Morelli was signed by the Cardinals as an undrafted free agent immediately following the 2008 NFL draft. In his first professional appearance, Morelli went 2-6 for 13 yards against the New Orleans Saints in Arizona's 2008 preseason opener. He was cut on August 30, 2008, after a lackluster performance in week 4 of the preseason against the Denver Broncos, which included an interception returned for a touchdown.

Morelli worked out for the Green Bay Packers and Buffalo Bills during the 2009 offseason. He was also slated to play for the San Jose SaberCats of the Arena Football League (AFL) until they suspended operations indefinitely in August 2009.

=== Milwaukee Iron ===
Morelli signed with the Milwaukee Iron of the new AFL on January 2, 2010.

He worked out with NFL teams at the 2010 NFL Combine, in hopes of returning to the NFL.

=== Pittsburgh Power ===
On November 2, 2010, it was announced that Morelli was signed by the expansion AFL team, the Pittsburgh Power. He was signed along with 15 other players after an open tryout held a month prior. Along with the former Penn State quarterback, the Power agreed to terms with his high school teammates, Tyrell Herbert and Kenny Lewis. Morelli was cut by the Power in February 2011. He was re-signed on March 25. He was released again.

== Personal ==
He was the quarterbacks coach at Plum High School in Pittsburgh, before moving to Indianapolis to train under the coaching of former NFL quarterback, Jack Trudeau.

After Morelli was done playing professional football, he opened X-Factor Sports Performance & QB Academy located in Westfield, Indiana.
