= 2009 Penn State Nittany Lions football team =

American college football season

2009 Penn State Nittany Lions football

Lambert-Meadowlands Trophy Capital One Bowl champion

Capital One Bowl, W 19–17 vs. LSU
- Conference: Big Ten Conference

Ranking
- Coaches: No. 8
- AP: No. 9
- Record: 11–2 (6–2 Big Ten)
- Head coach: Joe Paterno (44th season)
- Offensive coordinator: Galen Hall (6th season)
- Offensive scheme: Spread
- Defensive coordinator: Tom Bradley (10th season)
- Base defense: 4–3
- Captains: Daryll Clark; Sean Lee
- Home stadium: Beaver Stadium

2009 Big Ten Conference football standings
| | Conf. | | | Overall |
| Team | W | | L | W | | L |
|---|---|---|---|---|---|---|
| No. 5 Ohio State $ | 7 | – | 1 | 11 | – | 2 |
| No. 7 Iowa % | 6 | – | 2 | 11 | – | 2 |
| No. 9 Penn State | 6 | – | 2 | 11 | – | 2 |
| Northwestern | 5 | – | 3 | 8 | – | 5 |
| No. 16 Wisconsin | 5 | – | 3 | 10 | – | 3 |
| Michigan State | 4 | – | 4 | 6 | – | 7 |
| Purdue | 4 | – | 4 | 5 | – | 7 |
| Minnesota | 3 | – | 5 | 6 | – | 7 |
| Illinois | 2 | – | 6 | 3 | – | 9 |
| Michigan | 1 | – | 7 | 5 | – | 7 |
| Indiana | 1 | – | 7 | 4 | – | 8 |
$ – BCS representative as conference champion; % – BCS at-large representative; Rankings from AP Poll

The 2009 Penn State Nittany Lions football team represented the Pennsylvania State University in the 2009 college football season. The team was coached by Joe Paterno and played its home games in Beaver Stadium in University Park, Pennsylvania. Penn State had the highest graduation rate among all of the teams on the Associated Press Top 25 poll with 89% of its 2002 enrollees graduating. Miami and Alabama tied for second place with a graduation rate of 75%. The Nittany Lions finished the season with an 11–2 record and won the Lambert-Meadowlands Trophy award to the best team in the ECAC for the 28th time and the second consecutive year.

== Preseason ==
In December, backup quarterback Pat Devlin decided to transfer from Penn State and would not play in the Rose Bowl. Devlin appeared in ten games for the Nittany Lions, passing for 459 yards, four touchdowns and no interceptions. Devlin later committed to Delaware, a Division I FCS school, where he had two years of eligibility left.

In the Rose Bowl, backup tailback Stephfon Green left the game after sustaining what appeared to be a sprained right ankle. However, tests conducted after the team returned home revealed that Green sustained broken bones in his right leg and ankle and would require surgery to help repair the bones. Green was expected out of action for up to three months and would miss all of spring practice.

After the Rose Bowl, defensive line coach Larry Johnson, Sr. interviewed with Illinois head coach Ron Zook to become the Illini's defensive coordinator. While many anticipated Johnson to take the job, in the end Johnson decided to stay at his current position at Penn State.

In January, redshirt sophomore defensive end Aaron Maybin announced that he was skipping his final two seasons of eligibility and declared for the 2009 NFL draft. Junior defensive end Maurice Evans, despite losing his starting position and playing time to Maybin due to a three-game suspension for marijuana possession, also declared for the draft.

In addition to losing Maybin and Evans to early entry, the defense loses its entire starting secondary to graduation. However, after redshirting the previous season due to injury, linebacker Sean Lee returns to the line-up for his senior season.

The offensive unit loses three-fifths of the offensive line to graduation including All-American and Rimington Trophy winner A.Q. Shipley. Also lost to graduation are the wide receiver trio of Derrick Williams, Deon Butler and Jordan Norwood, all four-year starters for the team. Paterno and the coaching staff also needed to find backups for returning starting quarterback Daryll Clark after losing backup Devlin to transfer and third-stringer Paul Cianciolo to graduation.

Sean Lee and Daryll Clark were named team co-captains for the 2009 season. Lee also served as a captain the previous season.

=== Recruiting class ===
The Nittany Lions received 27 letters of intent on National Signing Day, February 4, 2009.

College recruiting
| Name | Hometown | School | Height | Weight | 40^{‡} | Commit date |
|---|---|---|---|---|---|---|
| Mark Arcidiacono; OT | Philadelphia, Pennsylvania | St. Joseph's Prep School | 6 ft 5 in (1.96 m) | 285 lb (129 kg) | NA | Apr 30, 2008 |
| Mark Arcidiacono; OT | Recruit ratings: Scout: Rivals: (78) | | | | | |
| Justin Brown; WR | Wilmington, Delaware | Concord HS | 6 ft 3.5 in (1.92 m) | 210 lb (95 kg) | 4.48 | Feb 4, 2009 |
| Justin Brown; WR | Recruit ratings: Scout: Rivals: (80) | | | | | |
| Nate Cadogan; OT | Portsmouth, Ohio | Portsmouth HS | 6 ft 6 in (1.98 m) | 250 lb (110 kg) | 5.00 | Jul 11, 2008 |
| Nate Cadogan; OT | Recruit ratings: Scout: Rivals: (70) | | | | | |
| Glenn Carson; MLB | Manahawkin, New Jersey | Southern Regional HS | 6 ft 3 in (1.91 m) | 220 lb (100 kg) | 4.60 | Sep 29, 2008 |
| Glenn Carson; MLB | Recruit ratings: Scout: Rivals: (78) | | | | | |
| Curtis Drake; CB | Philadelphia, Pennsylvania | West Philadelphia Catholic HS | 6 ft 0 in (1.83 m) | 170 lb (77 kg) | 4.68 | Jun 11, 2008 |
| Curtis Drake; CB | Recruit ratings: Scout: Rivals: (72) | | | | | |
| Curtis Dukes; RB | Philadelphia, New York | Indian River HS | 6 ft 2 in (1.88 m) | 235 lb (107 kg) | 4.50 | Jul 2, 2008 |
| Curtis Dukes; RB | Recruit ratings: Scout: Rivals: (77) | | | | | |
| Brandon Felder; WR | Oxon Hill, Maryland | Oxon Hill HS | 6 ft 3 in (1.91 m) | 165 lb (75 kg) | 4.50 | May 27, 2008 |
| Brandon Felder; WR | Recruit ratings: Scout: Rivals: (40) | | | | | |
| Anthony Fera; K | Houston, Texas | St. Pius X HS | 6 ft 2 in (1.88 m) | 230 lb (100 kg) | 4.8 | Oct 22, 2008 |
| Anthony Fera; K | Recruit ratings: Scout: Rivals: (80) | | | | | |
| Frank Figueroa; OG | Alexandria, Virginia | Edison HS | 6 ft 4 in (1.93 m) | 275 lb (125 kg) | 5.2 | May 15, 2008 |
| Frank Figueroa; OG | Recruit ratings: Scout: Rivals: (77) | | | | | |
| Garry Gilliam; TE | Hershey, Pennsylvania | Milton Hershey School | 6 ft 7 in (2.01 m) | 245 lb (111 kg) | 4.80 | Nov 13, 2008 |
| Garry Gilliam; TE | Recruit ratings: Scout: Rivals: (40) | | | | | |
| Darrell Givens; CB | Indian Head, Maryland | Lackey HS | 6 ft 1 in (1.85 m) | 178 lb (81 kg) | 4.50 | May 10, 2008 |
| Darrell Givens; CB | Recruit ratings: Scout: Rivals: (82) | | | | | |
| Adam Gress; OT | West Mifflin, Pennsylvania | West Mifflin Area HS | 6 ft 7 in (2.01 m) | 290 lb (130 kg) | 5.22 | Jul 2, 2008 |
| Adam Gress; OT | Recruit ratings: Scout: Rivals: (76) | | | | | |
| Jordan Hill; DT | Steelton, Pennsylvania | Steelton-Highspire HS | 6 ft 3 in (1.91 m) | 280 lb (130 kg) | 4.82 | Jan 3, 2009 |
| Jordan Hill; DT | Recruit ratings: Scout: Rivals: (76) | | | | | |
| Gerald Hodges; WLB | Paulsboro, New Jersey | Paulsboro HS | 6 ft 3 in (1.91 m) | 210 lb (95 kg) | 4.55 | Dec 12, 2008 |
| Gerald Hodges; WLB | Recruit ratings: Scout: Rivals: (80) | | | | | |
| Ty Howle; C | Bunn, North Carolina | Bunn HS | 6 ft 2 in (1.88 m) | 290 lb (130 kg) | 5.40 | Mar 23, 2008 |
| Ty Howle; C | Recruit ratings: Scout: Rivals: (79) | | | | | |
| Shawney Kersey; WR | Woodbury, New Jersey | Woodbury Junior-Senior HS | 6 ft 2 in (1.88 m) | 190 lb (86 kg) | 4.45 | Jan 17, 2009 |
| Shawney Kersey; WR | Recruit ratings: Scout: Rivals: (78) | | | | | |
| Christian Kuntz; WR | Camp Hill, Pennsylvania | Trinity HS | 6 ft 4 in (1.93 m) | 190 lb (86 kg) | 4.46 | Jul 4, 2008 |
| Christian Kuntz; WR | Recruit ratings: Scout: Rivals: (76) | | | | | |
| Stephon Morris; CB | Greenbelt, Maryland | Eleanor Roosevelt HS | 5 ft 9 in (1.75 m) | 175 lb (79 kg) | 4.40 | May 26, 2008 |
| Stephon Morris; CB | Recruit ratings: Scout: Rivals: (77) | | | | | |
| Kevin Newsome; QB | Portsmouth, Virginia | Churchland HS | 6 ft 3 in (1.91 m) | 213 lb (97 kg) | 4.50 | Dec 16, 2008 |
| Kevin Newsome; QB | Recruit ratings: Scout: Rivals: (80) | | | | | |
| Stephen Obeng-Agyapong; S | Cheektowaga, New York | John F. Kennedy SHS | 5 ft 11 in (1.80 m) | 185 lb (84 kg) | 4.50 | May 9, 2008 |
| Stephen Obeng-Agyapong; S | Recruit ratings: Scout: Rivals: (80) | | | | | |
| Eric Shrive; OT | Scranton, Pennsylvania | West Scranton HS | 6 ft 7 in (2.01 m) | 300 lb (140 kg) | 5.10 | May 15, 2008 |
| Eric Shrive; OT | Recruit ratings: Scout: Rivals: (82) | | | | | |
| Devon Smith; WR | Waldorf, Maryland | Westlake HS | 5 ft 7.5 in (1.71 m) | 145 lb (66 kg) | 4.34 | Oct 1, 2008 |
| Devon Smith; WR | Recruit ratings: Scout: Rivals: (77) | | | | | |
| Sean Stanley; DT | Gaithersburg, Maryland | Gaithersburg HS | 6 ft 1.5 in (1.87 m) | 247 lb (112 kg) | 4.81 | May 27, 2008 |
| Sean Stanley; DT | Recruit ratings: Scout: Rivals: (78) | | | | | |
| Derrick Thomas; CB | Greenbelt, Maryland | Eleanor Roosevelt HS | 6 ft 0.5 in (1.84 m) | 173 lb (78 kg) | 4.48 | May 12, 2008 |
| Derrick Thomas; CB | Recruit ratings: Scout: Rivals: (78) | | | | | |
| John Urschel; OG | Buffalo, New York | Canisius HS | 6 ft 3 in (1.91 m) | 263 lb (119 kg) | 5.18 | Jan 17, 2009 |
| John Urschel; OG | Recruit ratings: Scout: Rivals: (40) | | | | | |
| Michael Wallace; CB | Olney, Maryland | Our Lady Good Counsel HS | 5 ft 9 in (1.75 m) | 177 lb (80 kg) | 4.65 | Feb 3, 2009 |
| Michael Wallace; CB | Recruit ratings: Scout: Rivals: (73) | | | | | |
| Malcolm Willis; S | Indian Head, Maryland | Lackey HS | 5 ft 11 in (1.80 m) | 210 lb (95 kg) | 4.65 | Apr 29, 2008 |
| Malcolm Willis; S | Recruit ratings: Scout: Rivals: (74) | | | | | |
Overall recruit ranking: Scout: 10 Rivals: 25
‡ Refers to 40-yard dash; Note: In many cases, Scout, Rivals, 247Sports, On3, and ESPN may conflict in their listings of height, weight and 40 time.; In these cases, the average was taken. ESPN grades are on a 100-point scale.; Sources: "Penn State Commit List for 2009". Rivals.; "Scout.com Football Recruiting: Penn State". Scout.; "RecruitTracker 2009: Penn State". ESPN.; "Scout.com Team Recruiting Rankings". Scout.; "2009 Team Ranking". Rivals.com.

=== Spring practice ===
The annual Blue-White scrimmage at Beaver Stadium was held April 25. The White squad defeated the Blue 21–16 in front of a record crowd of 76,500.

Senior quarterback Daryll Clark was 10 of 13 for 123 yards in limited duty for the Blue team against the first-team defense. True freshman Kevin Newsome led the White offense and finished 9 of 13 for 71 yards and one touchdown. In all, four quarterbacks on the two teams combined to complete 33 of 50 passes for 388 yards, four touchdowns and no interceptions.

Sophomore running back Brandon Beachum gained a game-high 38 yards on 10 carries. Junior Evan Royster led the Blue with 21 yards on just three carries in limited action.

=== Pre-season awards ===
- Jeremy Boone
  Second-team Phil Steele pre-season All-Big Ten
- NaVorro Bowman
  Second-team Athlon Sports pre-season All-American
  First-team Athlon Sports pre-season All-Big Ten
  Third-team Phil Steele pre-season All-American
  First-team Phil Steele pre-season All-Big Ten
  Second-team Sporting News pre-season All-American
  First-team Sporting News pre-season All-Big Ten
  ESPN.com pre-season All-Big Ten
  ESPN.com pre-season All-American
- Daryll Clark
  First-team Athlon Sports pre-season All-Big Ten
  Third-team Phil Steele pre-season All-Big Ten
  ESPN.com pre-season All-Big Ten
- Lou Eliades
  Third-team Phil Steele pre-season All-Big Ten
- Stephfon Green
  Fourth-team Phil Steele pre-season All-Big Ten
- Abe Koroma
  Fourth-team Phil Steele pre-season All-Big Ten
- Dennis Landolt
  First-team Athlon Sports pre-season All-Big Ten
  First-team Phil Steele pre-season All-Big Ten
- Sean Lee
  Second-team Athlon Sports pre-season All-Big Ten
  Second-team Phil Steele pre-season All-American
  First-team Phil Steele pre-season All-Big Ten
- Jared Odrick
  Third-team Athlon Sports pre-season All-American
  First-team Athlon Sports pre-season All-Big Ten
  Third-team Phil Steele pre-season All-American
  First-team Phil Steele pre-season All-Big Ten
  Third-team Sporting News pre-season All-American
  First-team Sporting News pre-season All-Big Ten
  ESPN.com pre-season All-Big Ten
- Evan Royster
  Second-team Athlon Sports pre-season All-American
  First-team Athlon Sports pre-season All-Big Ten
  Second-team Phil Steele pre-season All-American
  First-team Phil Steele pre-season All-Big Ten
  Second-team Sporting News pre-season All-American
  First-team Sporting News pre-season All-Big Ten
  ESPN.com pre-season All-Big Ten
- A. J. Wallace
  Fourth-team Phil Steele pre-season All-Big Ten
- Stefen Wisniewski
  Third-team Athlon Sports pre-season All-American
  First-team Athlon Sports pre-season All-Big Ten
  First-team Phil Steele pre-season All-Big Ten
  Second-team Sporting News pre-season All-American
  First-team Sporting News pre-season All-Big Ten
  ESPN.com pre-season All-Big Ten

== Schedule ==
| Date | Time | Opponent | Rank | Site | TV | Result | Attendance | Source |
|---|---|---|---|---|---|---|---|---|
| September 5 | 12:00 p.m. | Akron* | No. 9 | Beaver Stadium; University Park, PA | BTN | W 31–7 | 104,968 | |
| September 12 | 12:00 p.m. | Syracuse* | No. 7 | Beaver Stadium; University Park, PA (rivalry) | BTN | W 28–7 | 106,387 | |
| September 19 | 12:00 p.m. | Temple* | No. 5 | Beaver Stadium; University Park, PA | BTN | W 31–6 | 105,514 | |
| September 26 | 8:00 p.m. | Iowa | No. 5 | Beaver Stadium; University Park, PA (College GameDay) | ABC | L 10–21 | 109,316 | |
| October 3 | 3:30 p.m. | at Illinois | No. 15 | Memorial Stadium; Champaign, IL | ABC/ESPN2 | W 35–17 | 62,870 | |
| October 10 | 12:00 p.m. | No. 25 (FCS) Eastern Illinois* | No. 14 | Beaver Stadium; University Park, PA | ESPNC | W 52–3 | 104,488 | |
| October 17 | 3:30 p.m. | Minnesota^{†} | No. 14 | Beaver Stadium; University Park, PA (Governor's Victory Bell) | ABC/ESPN | W 20–0 | 107,981 | |
| October 24 | 3:30 p.m. | at Michigan | No. 13 | Michigan Stadium; Ann Arbor, MI (rivalry) | ABC/ESPN | W 35–10 | 110,377 | |
| October 31 | 4:30 p.m. | at Northwestern | No. 12 | Ryan Field; Evanston, IL | ESPN | W 34–13 | 30,546 | |
| November 7 | 3:30 p.m. | No. 12 Ohio State | No. 11 | Beaver Stadium; University Park, PA (rivalry) | ABC/ESPN2 | L 7–24 | 110,033 | |
| November 14 | 12:00 p.m. | Indiana | No. 19 | Beaver Stadium; University Park, PA | BTN | W 31–20 | 107,379 | |
| November 21 | 3:30 p.m. | at Michigan State | No. 13 | Spartan Stadium; East Lansing, MI (rivalry) | ABC/ESPN | W 42–14 | 73,771 | |
| January 1, 2010 | 1:00 p.m. | vs. No. 12 LSU* | No. 11 | Florida Citrus Bowl; Orlando, FL (Capital One Bowl) | ABC | W 19–17 | 63,025 | |
*Non-conference game; ^{†}Homecoming; Rankings from AP Poll released prior to the game; All times are in Eastern time

== Personnel ==
2009 Penn State Nittany Lions football team roster
Players
Coaches
Offense

| Pos. | # | Name | Class |
|---|---|---|---|
| WR | 2 | Chaz Powell | So |
| RB | 3 | Brandon Beachum | So |
| WR | 4 | Shawney Kersey | Fr |
| WR | 5 | Graham Zug | Jr |
| WR | 6 | Derek Moye | So |
| WR | 7 | Curtis Drake | Fr |
| WR | 8 | Brandon Moseby-Felder | Fr |
| RB | 9 | Michael Zordich | Fr |
| TE | 10 | Andrew Quarless | Sr |
| QB | 11 | Matthew McGloin | Fr |
| QB | 12 | Kevin Newsome | Fr |
| TE | 13 | Mark Wedderburn | Fr |
| WR | 14 | A.J Price | Fr |
| QB | 15 | Steven Hill | Fr |
| QB | 16 | Shane McGregor | Fr |
| QB | 17 | Daryll Clark (C) | Sr |
| TE | 18 | Brennan Coakley | Sr |
| WR | 18 | Andrew Goodman | Fr |
| QB | 19 | Garrett Venuto | Fr |
| WR | 19 | Justin Brown | Fr |
| WR | 20 | Devon Smith | Fr |
| RB | 21 | Stephfon Green | So |
| WR | 21 | Tariq Tongue | Fr |
| RB | 22 | Evan Royster | Jr |
| RB | 23 | Shaine Thompson | So |
| RB | 24 | Derek Day | Fr |
| RB | 26 | Curtis Dukes | Fr |
| WR | 26 | J.D. Mason | Fr |
| RB | 29 | Kevin Kowalishen | Fr |
| FB | 30 | Josh Matzkin | Jr |
| RB | 32 | Brent Carter | Jr |
| FB | 33 | Andre Dupree | Fr |
| WR | 34 | Christian Kuntz | Fr |
| FB | 35 | Pat Zerbe | Fr |
| RB | 37 | Joe Suhey | So |
| FB | 38 | Andre Dupree | Fr |
| G | 50 | DeOn'tae Pannell | So |
| G | 54 | Matt Stankiewitch | Fr |
| OL | 58 | Adam Gress | Fr |
| C | 60 | Ty Howle | Fr |
| C | 61 | Stefen Wisniewski | Jr |
| G | 62 | Frank Figueroa | Fr |
| OL | 63 | Mark Arcidiacono | Fr |
| OL | 64 | John Urschel | Fr |
| G | 67 | Quinn Barham | So |
| C | 68 | Doug Klopacz | Jr |
| OL | 70 | Anthony Tortorelli | So |
| OT | 72 | Nerraw McCormack | Sr |
| OT | 73 | Dennis Landolt | Sr |
| G | 74 | Johnnie Troutman | So |
| OL | 75 | Eric Shrive | Fr |
| OL | 76 | Nate Cadogan | Fr |
| OT | 77 | Lou Eliades | Jr |
| OT | 78 | Mike Farrell | Fr |
| OT | 79 | Ako Poti | Sr |
| TE | 80 | Andrew Szczerba | So |
| WR | 81 | Ryan Scherer | Fr |
| TE | 82 | Mickey Shuler | Sr |
| WR | 83 | Brett Brackett | Jr |
| WR | 84 | Patrick Mauti | Sr |
| WR | 89 | Sean Luchnick | Fr |

Defense

| Pos. | # | Name | Class |
|---|---|---|---|
| CB | 1 | A.J. Wallace | Sr |
| CB | 4 | Knowledge Timmons | Sr |
| CB | 5 | Jerome Hayes | Fr |
| LB | 6 | Gerald Hodges | Fr |
| S | 7 | Cedric Jeffries | Jr |
| CB | 8 | D'Anton Lynn | So |
| LB | 11 | Navorro Bowman | Jr |
| CB | 12 | Stephon Morris | Fr |
| DB | 12 | Evan Lewis | Fr |
| S | 13 | Andrew Dailey | So |
| DB | 14 | Mike Wallace | Fr |
| LB | 15 | Bani Gbadyu | Jr |
| CB | 16 | Shelton McCullough | Jr |
| S | 18 | Nick Sukay | So |
| S | 23 | Stephen Obeng-Agyapong | Fr |
| DB | 24 | Malcolm Willis | Fr |
| DB | 25 | Derrick Thomas | Fr |
| S | 27 | Jacob Fagnano | Fr |
| S | 28 | Drew Astorina | So |
| LB | 31 | Nick Delligatti | Fr |
| LB | 32 | Dakota Royer | Fr |
| LB | 33 | Michael Yancich | Fr |
| LB | 34 | Nathan Stupar | So |
| CB | 35 | Jesse Alfreno | Jr |
| S | 36 | Kyle Johnson | So |
| S | 38 | Tyler Ahrenhold | So |
| DE | 39 | Tom Golarz | Sr |
| LB | 42 | Michael Mauti | So |
| LB | 43 | Josh Hull | Sr |
| DE | 44 | Kevion Latham | So |
| LB | 45 | Sean Lee (C) | Sr |
| S | 46 | Stephen Joseph | So |
| DT | 47 | Jordan Hill | Fr |
| LB | 47 | Kenny Pollock | Fr |
| LB | 48 | Chris Colasanti | Jr |
| DE | 51 | Jonathan Stewart | So |
| LB | 52 | Brian Irvin | Fr |
| LB | 54 | James Van Fleet | Fr |
| DT | 55 | Tom McEowen | Jr |
| DE | 56 | Eric Latimore | So |
| DE | 59 | Pete Massaro | Fr |
| DT | 71 | Devon Still | So |
| DE | 81 | Jack Crawford | So |
| DT | 85 | Ollie Ogbu | Jr |
| DL | 89 | Gary Gilliam | Fr |
| DE | 90 | Sean Stanley | Fr |
| DT | 91 | Jared Odrick | Sr |
| DT | 92 | Chima Okoli | So |
| DT | 93 | James Terry | Fr |
| DE | 94 | Mikel Berry | Fr |
| DL | 97 | J.R. Refice | Fr |
| DE | 98 | Matt Kenney | Fr |
| DT | 99 | Brandon Ware | Fr |

Special teams

| Pos. | # | Name | Class |
|---|---|---|---|
| K | 28 | David Soldner | Fr |
| K | 30 | Anthony Fera | Fr |
| K | 36 | Collin Wagner | Jr |
| LS | 40 | Andrew Pitz | Sr |
| P | 41 | Jeremy Boone | Sr |
| P | 49 | Ryan Breen | So |
| LS | 53 | Jon Rohrbaugh | So |
| LS | 56 | Michael Fuhrman | Fr |
| LS | 57 | Emery Etter | Fr |

Head coach

- Joe Paterno

Coordinators/assistant coaches

- Dick Anderson – Offensive Line (Guards and Centers)
- Tom Bradley – Defensive Coordinator and Cornerbacks
- Kermit Buggs – Safeties
- Galen Hall – Offensive Coordinator and Running Backs
- Larry Johnson, Sr. – Defensive Line
- Bill Kenney – Offensive Tackles and Tight Ends
- Mike McQueary – Wide Receivers and Recruiting Coordinator
- Jay Paterno – Quarterbacks
- Ron Vanderlinden – Linebackers
- John Thomas – Strength and Conditioning

Legend

- (C) Team captain
- (S) Suspended
- (I) Ineligible
- Injured
- Redshirt

Roster
Last update: November 20, 2009

== Game summaries ==
=== September 5: Akron ===
| | 1 | 2 | 3 | 4 | Total |
|---|---|---|---|---|---|
| Akron | 0 | 0 | 7 | 0 | 7 |
| #8 Penn State | 14 | 17 | 0 | 0 | 31 |

The Penn State defense did not give up a first down to the Zips in the first half as the Nittany Lions won 31–7. This game was not as close as the score. Backup linemen on both sides of the ball were slowly blended in during the second half while the key starters remained in until midway through the fourth quarter.

Tailback Evan Royster opened the scoring on a 5-yard run on Penn State's first drive of the game. Chaz Powell later extended Penn State's lead to 14–0 with an 8-yard reception, his first career touchdown reception. Derek Moye led all receivers with six receptions for 138 yards and a touchdown. Graham Zug also caught a touchdown, and the Nittany Lions rolled to a 31–0 halftime lead and still won comfortably despite not scoring in the second half for the first time since a 13–3 loss at Wisconsin in 2006. Akron finished the game with 8 first downs and one touchdown late in the third quarter against a mix of backups and starters. Backup quarterback Kevin Newsome played in the final series along with other reserves and led the Nittany Lions down to the Akron 4-yard line.

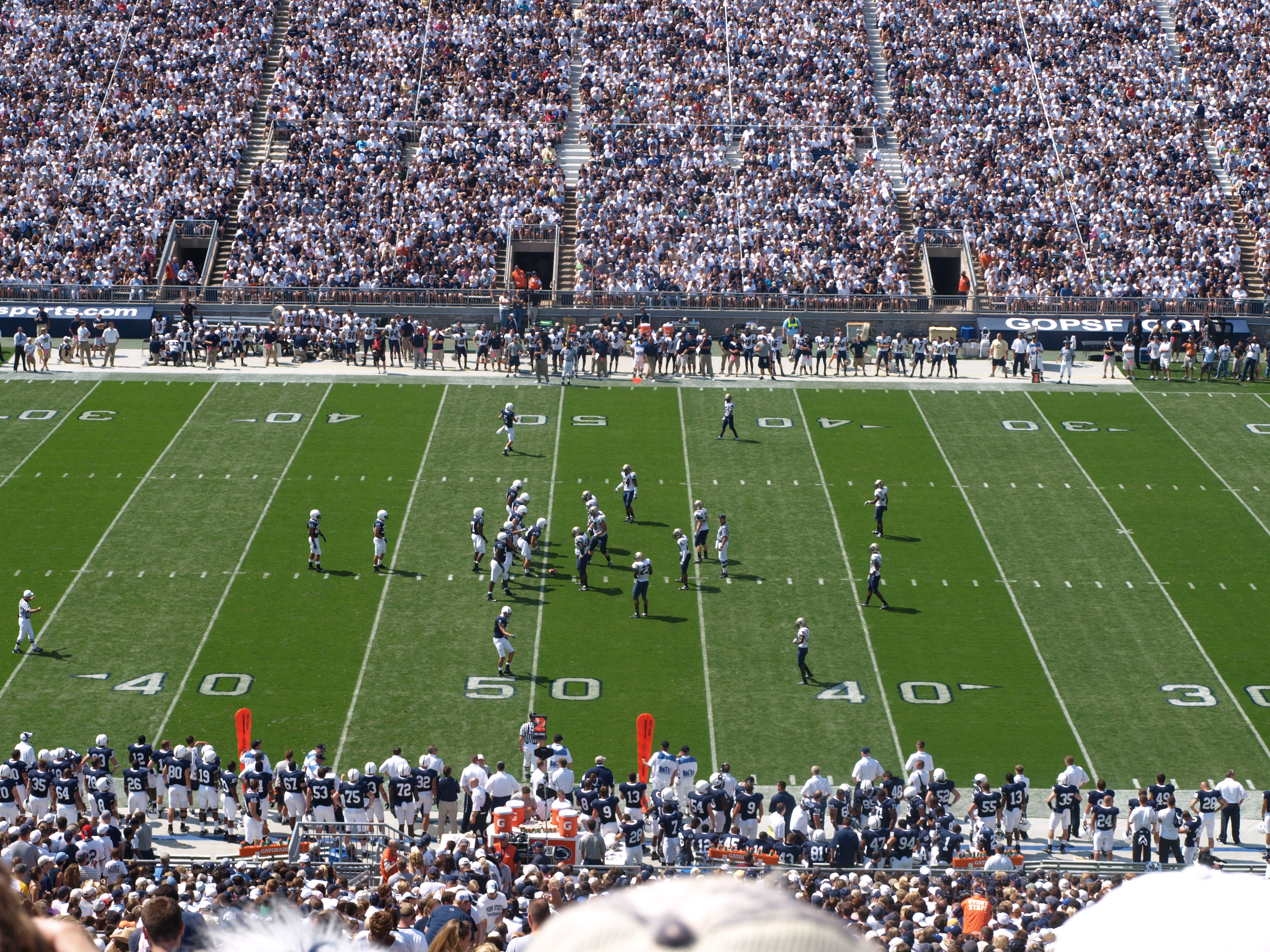
The Penn State offense lines up against the Akron defense

Akron got its only points on a 40-yard pass to Deryn Bowser in the third quarter. Defensively, Penn State allowed eight net yards in the first half and 186 yards for the game. The Nittany Lions recorded 13 tackles for loss including four sacks. Safety Andrew Dailey snagged his first career interception, and senior linebacker Sean Lee made seven tackles including two for negative yardage in his first action in 18 months. Junior linebacker NaVorro Bowman left the game early with an injury, and his replacement, sophomore Nate Stupar made 12 tackles with a sack. Akron had just 28 rushing yards, which would be the fewest allowed by Penn State all year.

Senior quarterback Daryll Clark set career highs, going 29 of 40 for 353 yards. His 254 yards passing in the first half were a school record. For his efforts, Clark was named the Big Ten Co-Offensive Player of the Week.

=== September 12: Syracuse ===
| | 1 | 2 | 3 | 4 | Total |
|---|---|---|---|---|---|
| Syracuse | 0 | 0 | 0 | 7 | 7 |
| #5 Penn State | 7 | 7 | 7 | 7 | 28 |

Penn State won their second game of the year in a 28–7 win over Syracuse. Penn State scored early in the first quarter to go up 7–0 with a Daryll Clark pass to Evan Royster. Penn State nearly scored again early in the second quarter when faced with a 4th and 1, but Clark fumbled the snap to give Syracuse the ball near the goal line. Penn State would score on their next drive to go up 14–0 from a 12-yard run from Evan Royster, which would hold at halftime as Syracuse missed a long field goal. Penn State scored again late in the third quarter. Syracuse attempted to convert a 4th down with a pass, but it was dropped, preserving Penn State's 21–0 lead early in the 4th. Penn State scored once again midway through the 4th with a play action pass to Mickey Shuler to take a 28–0 lead. After getting the ball back, backup Kevin Newsome was subbed in along with other second string players, but a Newsome fumble gave Syracuse the ball with good field position, and they scored their only points against the Penn State second string defense in their only series of the game. Penn State recovered the onside kick attempt and ran out the clock with the backups still in. Matt McGloin also took a few snaps in his first college game, handing off to Brent Carter and Brandon Beachum.

Daryll Clark passed for 240 yards in a heavily pass-oriented game as Penn State only had 78 yards on the ground, 41 of those from Royster.

=== September 19: Temple ===
| | 1 | 2 | 3 | 4 | Total |
|---|---|---|---|---|---|
| Temple | 3 | 0 | 3 | 0 | 6 |
| #5 Penn State | 7 | 14 | 3 | 7 | 31 |

Despite several key players being sick with the flu, the Nittany Lions won convincingly over their in-state rivals, with the 25 point difference being their biggest of the season to this point. Temple became not only the first team to score twice on Penn State this season, but also the first team to not score a touchdown, continuing Penn State's streak of games versus Temple where the Owls scored no touchdowns dating back to 2003. Penn State managed a more balanced passing and running attack than in their previous two games.

Temple out-passed Penn State 205–173, but the Nittany Lions' defense didn't give up any big plays. The defense allowed only 46 yards rushing while Penn State had 186—their highest so far this season. Penn State had a 7–3 lead after one quarter, but Temple recovered an onside kick, changing the momentum of the game momentarily. Penn State's defense forced a three-and-out and the Nittany Lions coasted to a 21–3 halftime lead. Both teams scored a field goal in the third quarter, and Penn State scored a touchdown to bring the final score to 31–6.

=== September 26: Iowa ===
| | 1 | 2 | 3 | 4 | Total |
|---|---|---|---|---|---|
| Iowa | 0 | 5 | 0 | 16 | 21 |
| #4 Penn State | 10 | 0 | 0 | 0 | 10 |

Penn State raced out to a quick 10–0 lead, but Iowa made some key adjustments that prevented Penn State from scoring for the rest of the game. The rain also played a factor in Penn State's inability to continue their pass-heavy gameplan from their first three games. Although Penn State controlled the first quarter, Iowa controlled the second (partly aided by Nittany Lion penalties). Iowa scored a safety with a sack of Darryl Clark in the end zone following a punt downed at the 6, and then scored a field goal, but missed a field goal right before halftime after a roughing the kicker penalty negated a three and out. Neither team would score in an equally controlled third quarter that had a slight edge in Penn State's favor, with Collin Wagner missing a 48-yard attempt for Penn State but the momentum soon changed.

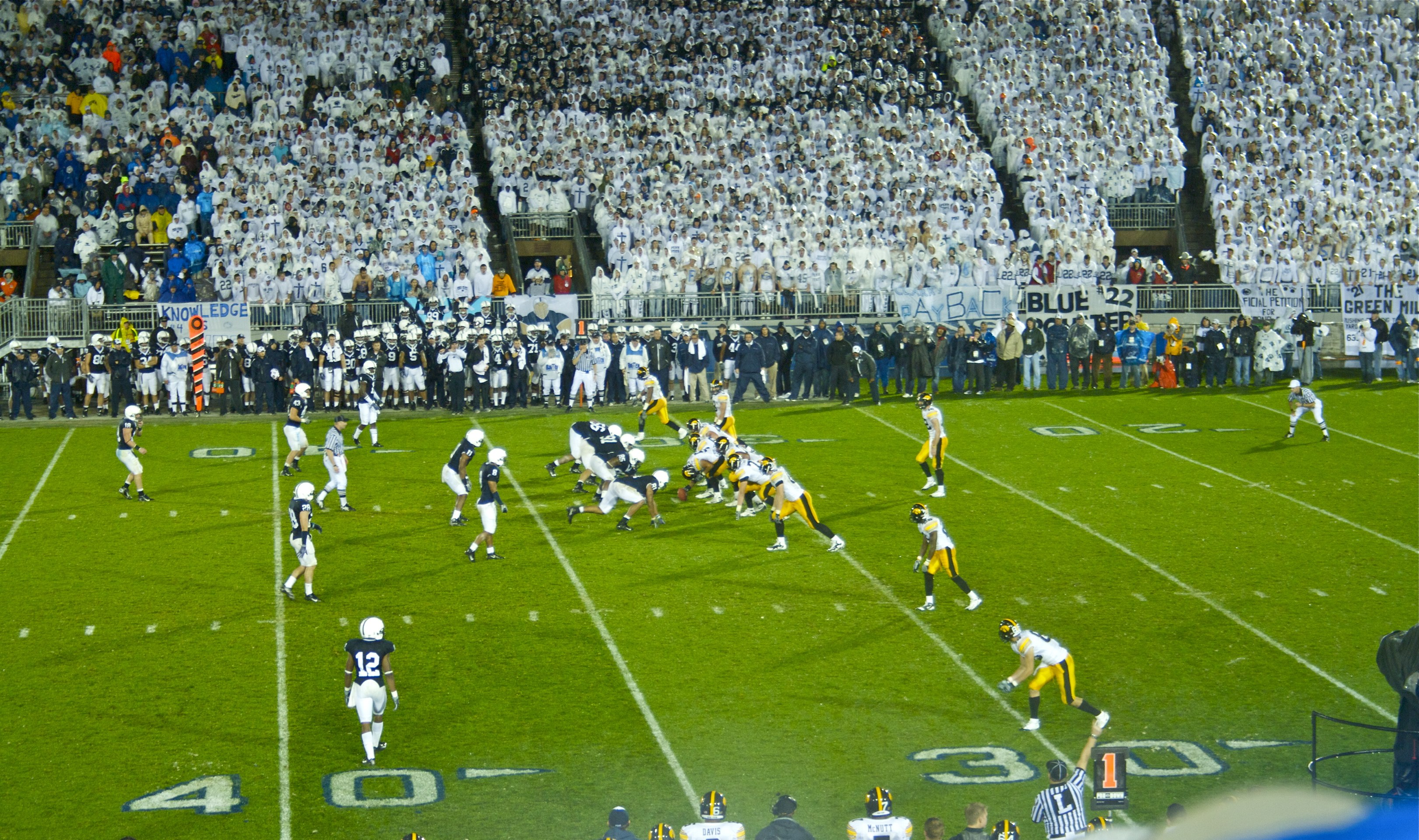
Iowa's offense lines up against the Penn State defense

Penn State had to punt, and was clinging to a 10–5 lead early in the 4th, Iowa then blocked a punt and ran it back for a touchdown. Iowa's 2 point attempt failed, but they led by one point. With the momentum changed, Penn State's drive down the field ended in an interception. With the momentum on their side, the Hawkeyes drove down the field to increase the lead to 10–18. Penn State drove down the field following a huge kickoff return for a game-tying touchdown, but in the red zone, Evan Royster fumbled. The Hawkeyes recovered, and with 12 seconds left, kicked a field goal to prevent Penn State from winning in the final seconds from a possible Hail Mary and 2-point conversion. The final play of the game was a handoff to Royster. After the game, both teams found themselves ranked in similar positions, with the Hawkeyes 13/17 and Penn State 15/13 in ranking. Iowa was ranked #21 initially but after a close game with FCS Northern Iowa, they were unranked until upsetting Penn State. After the game, many Penn State fans expressed frustration over what they felt was the second consecutive year of "dominating Iowa for three quarters before losing", even though despite the longstanding lead, they only dominated the first 17 minutes of the game and a portion of the third quarter.

This is the last time Penn State was ranked in the Top 10 until 2016 season where Penn State was ranked No.10 on Nov 8, 2016.

=== October 3: @ Illinois ===
| | 1 | 2 | 3 | 4 | Total |
|---|---|---|---|---|---|
| #13 Penn State | 0 | 7 | 7 | 21 | 35 |
| Illinois | 0 | 3 | 0 | 14 | 17 |

In a game not as close as the score, Stephfon Green and Evan Royster combined for 225 yards rushing as Penn State's rushing offense pounded away at the Illinois defense, running for a total of 338 yards and scoring all five of its offensive touchdowns on the ground. Green and Royster each scored a touchdown. In a slow first half, Illinois outgained Penn State 222–165 in the first half, despite this, Penn State held a 7–3 lead at halftime. The second half was a different story, as Penn State held the ball for 12:04 in the third quarter and outgained Illinois 208–8 in the quarter alone, Penn State scored a touchdown midway through the quarter, and would score another on the second play of the fourth. Penn State scored once again in the fourth, increasing the lead to 28–3. By that time the Illini had only 16 yards and no first downs in the second half, but with the backups starting to be subbed in, Illinois was on the move, and scored a touchdown midway through the fourth. Penn State answered with a touchdown of their own following an interception, with the second string offense subbed in, scoring on a 12-yard rush by backup Brent Carter on a pitch from backup quarterback Kevin Newsome that went for a touchdown to give Penn State their most points scored all year and a 35–10 lead. Illinois scored a touchdown with a Juice Williams keeper with 42 seconds left against the second and third string defense. Penn State recovered the onside kick and Kevin Newsome ran for a first down to run out the clock.

Quarterback Daryll Clark was of 25 for 175 yards, and also ran for 83 yards and two touchdowns, both in the second half of the game.

Defensively for Penn State, Josh Hull made 11 tackles, including one for a loss. Eric Latimore, Jack Crawford, and Sean Stanley were credited with a sack each. Stanley also forced a fumble that Jared Odrick recovered. Stephon Morris also snagged his first career interception at the end of the first half to prevent an Illini score, that was nearly run back for a touchdown. The first string defense also only allowed 16 second half Illini yards on three drives in the third and fourth quarter.

Third-string tailback Brent Carter scored his first career touchdown late in the fourth quarter to give Penn State its first touchdown from reserves this year.

=== October 10: Eastern Illinois ===
| | 1 | 2 | 3 | 4 | Total |
|---|---|---|---|---|---|
| Eastern Illinois | 0 | 0 | 3 | 0 | 3 |
| #12 Penn State | 10 | 28 | 7 | 7 | 52 |

Starting quarterback Daryll Clark scored the first points of the game on a 1-yard touchdown run in the first quarter. Colin Wagner added a chipshot field goal to extend the lead to 10–0. In the second quarter, Brett Brackett scored on a two-yard strike from Clark. Chaz Powell and Derek Moye also caught touchdown passes.

Eastern Illinois got its only points of the game on a field goal partway into the third quarter, but squandering two chances in the second. Stephon Green then extended the Penn State lead to 45–3 with a 26-yard touchdown run. Backup quarterback Kevin Newsome (who was 4/5 for 34 yards) scored his first career touchdown early in the fourth on a 9-yard run to make the score official. It was 52–3 after the score, Newsome would lead Penn State into the red zone again, but this time the result was a failed 4th down conversion rather than the field goal attempt. Matt McGloin also played in his second game this year and attempted his first career passes.

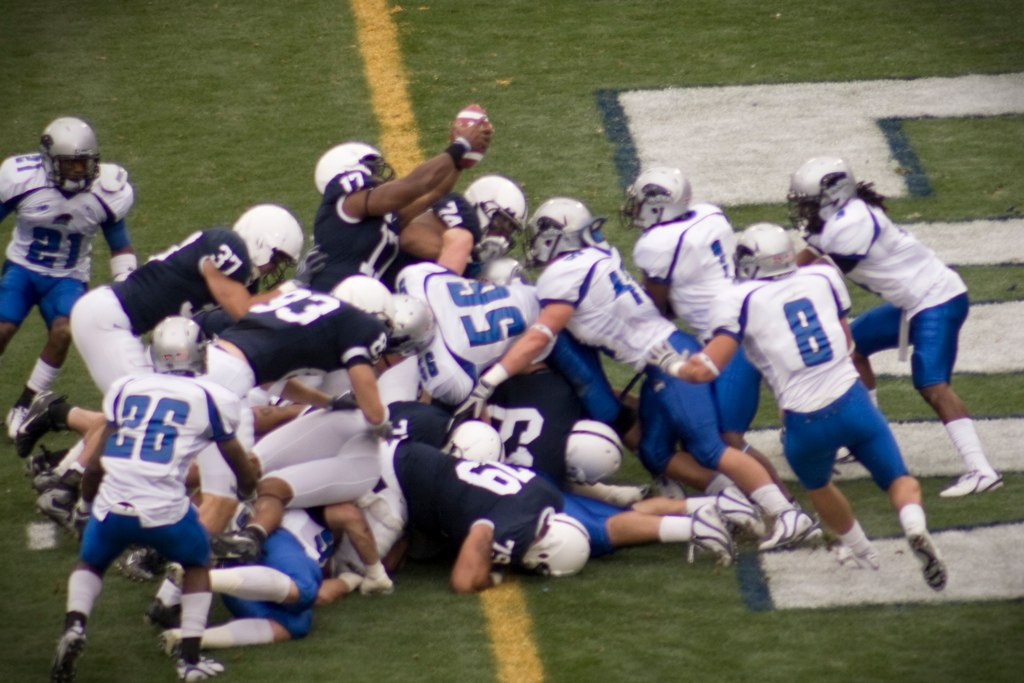
Daryll Clark stretches for the first touchdown of the game.

Many backups saw action for both teams. Penn State punted only twice throughout the game, both times were in the second half with backups in. Regardless, Penn State still won by their most lopsided score of the year.

Defensively for Penn State, Josh Hull had 11 tackles. A.J. Wallace also snagged an interception. Ollie Ogbu forced the fumble returned by NaVorro Bowman for a touchdown before the half, the first defensive touchdown for Penn State this year to already give them their most points all year at 38.

=== October 17: Minnesota ===
| | 1 | 2 | 3 | 4 | Total |
|---|---|---|---|---|---|
| Minnesota | 0 | 0 | 0 | 0 | 0 |
| #13 Penn State | 3 | 10 | 7 | 0 | 20 |

Penn State improved their overall record over Minnesota to 7–4 and held onto the Governor's Victory Bell once again. This was Tim Brewster's first game against the Nittany Lions, who did not play Minnesota in 2007 and 2008. Penn State scored two field goals early on and scored a touchdown on a pass that was initially called an incompletion but reviewed as a touchdown. Scoring one more touchdown in the third quarter, Penn State cruised to their first shutout since 2007 at Temple, where they won 31–0. Penn State's offense and defense dominated much more than what was reflected on the scoreboard, however. Minnesota had only 7 first downs and 138 total yards, most of which came from a long drive that went for no points due to a failed 4th down conversion on a 4th quarter goal line stand. At the end of the game, backup QB Kevin Newsome handed off a few times to kill the clock.

Penn State held the ball for 42 minutes of the game, their best since 1991. Penn State also had nearly 500 yards of offense in this game. In contrast, Minnesota had just 7 first downs, 138 yards of offense, 101 yards passing, and 37 yards rushing, their lowest in years. Collin Wagner made two field goals, but missed two more. Despite this, Adam Weber was only sacked once, escaping two more, and Clark was not sacked the entire game. This was also the first time Penn State shut out Minnesota, the previous best was 3 points in 1994, when Penn State won 56–3 on their quest to their first Big Ten championship, finishing 12–0 (8–0) and ranked #2.

=== October 24: @ Michigan ===
| | 1 | 2 | 3 | 4 | Total |
|---|---|---|---|---|---|
| #11 Penn State | 10 | 9 | 13 | 3 | 35 |
| Michigan | 7 | 3 | 0 | 0 | 10 |

Penn State defeated Michigan in Ann Arbor for the first time since 1996, currently holding a two-game winning streak over the Wolverines. Daryll Clark threw for 230 yards and four touchdowns, three to wide receiver Graham Zug and a 61-yard pass to tight end Andrew Quarless. Clark became the Nittany Lions' all-time leader in touchdowns. The defense forced four turnovers, two interceptions, one by NaVorro Bowman and one by Drew Astorino and two fumble recoveries. Evan Royster also had over 100 yards rushing.

To start the game, Michigan drove down the field 70 yards and took a 7–0 lead, but Penn State responded and tied it up, then kicked a field goal late in the quarter. After a Penn State punt, a bad snap in the end zone led to a safety, and Penn State scored another touchdown to go up 19–7. Michigan managed a field goal right before halftime. Penn State scored two touchdowns (missing a two-point conversion the first time) in five minutes in the third quarter, then seemed to take their foot off the gas. At one point, Michigan blocked a Jeremy Boone punt, but they were unable to cash in, as Penn State's defense forced a fumble and got the ball back. A long drive, aided by a roughing the punter penalty, ended with Penn State's final points, a field goal. Michigan's final drive went deep into Penn State territory but was intercepted and returned to midfield.

=== October 31: @ Northwestern ===
| | 1 | 2 | 3 | 4 | Total |
|---|---|---|---|---|---|
| #10 Penn State | 3 | 7 | 3 | 21 | 34 |
| Northwestern | 3 | 10 | 0 | 0 | 13 |

Penn State mounted a second half comeback after trailing the Wildcats 10–13 at halftime and being tied 13–13 going into the 4th. Three touchdowns in less than four minutes in the 4th quarter enabled the Nittany Lions to pull away with two of the touchdowns happening on the first play from scrimmage in each drive.

=== November 7: Ohio State ===
| | 1 | 2 | 3 | 4 | Total |
|---|---|---|---|---|---|
| #12 Ohio State | 7 | 3 | 7 | 7 | 24 |
| #10 Penn State | 0 | 7 | 0 | 0 | 7 |

Ohio State became the first team to score at least once in every quarter on Penn State this year, scoring a touchdown in three quarters, and a field goal in one. In what was a defensive battle for most of the game, called "Rope-A-Dope" football by the announcers, Ohio State pulled away late to win thanks to special teams. Despite the apparent laugher on the scoreboard, Ohio State only had 15 first downs and went 6–16 on third down, with their four scoring drives totalling only 178 yards. Penn State's defense also forced a sack on Pryor (recorded officially as a tackle for loss, although this "tackle for loss" happened during a pass play), but did not force any key fumbles, although Ohio State forced an interception after Penn State got good field position to attempt a comeback from 24–7 midway through the 4th quarter.

=== November 14: Indiana ===
| | 1 | 2 | 3 | 4 | Total |
|---|---|---|---|---|---|
| Indiana | 10 | 0 | 0 | 10 | 20 |
| #17 Penn State | 0 | 10 | 7 | 14 | 31 |

After a slow start and quick 10–0 lead from Indiana, Penn State scored 10 points right before halftime to tie it up, then a pick six as Indiana was driving downfield put the Nittany Lions on top. They would score early in the 4th and then score once more late in the game following a Hoosiers field goal. Indiana would then score very late to make the final score respectable.

=== November 21: @ Michigan State ===
| | 1 | 2 | 3 | 4 | Total |
|---|---|---|---|---|---|
| #12 Penn State | 0 | 7 | 28 | 7 | 42 |
| Michigan State | 0 | 7 | 0 | 7 | 14 |

Penn State quarterback Daryll Clark passed for 310 yards and four touchdowns against Michigan State. He set a school record with 23 touchdown passes on the season and set the Penn State career record with 42. Running back Evan Royster gained 114 yards on 13 carries. Graham Zug and Andrew Quarless caught two TD passes each.

The teams were tied 7–7 at halftime before Penn State jumped to a 14–7 lead just over a minute into the second half with the help of a trick play: Wide receiver Curtis Drake threw a halfback option to Quarless for a 14-yard touchdown. Later in the third quarter, Clark connected with running back Joe Suhey on a 30-yard touchdown pass. Penn State safety Nick Sukay intercepted a Kirk Cousins pass on the next series, setting up the Nittany Lions at the Michigan State 32. Clark hit Zug in the endzone on the very next play, giving Penn State a 28–7 lead with 5:22 left in the third quarter.

The Nittany Lions would score two more touchdowns. The final one was Kevin Newsome's second career touchdown as both Newsome and Matthew McGloin had some playing time. and give up one on their way to a 42–14 victory, thus securing the Land Grant Trophy for another year and back-to-back 10-win seasons. Clark and linebacker NaVorro Bowman were named Big Ten Co-offensive and Co-Defensive Players of the Week, respectively. This was Penn State's biggest win ever in East Lansing.

=== January 1 vs. LSU ===
| | 1 | 2 | 3 | 4 | Total |
|---|---|---|---|---|---|
| #11 Penn State | 7 | 6 | 3 | 3 | 19 |
| #15 LSU | 0 | 3 | 7 | 7 | 17 |

Penn State coach Joe Paterno got his record 24th bowl win and handed Les Miles his first loss in five bowls as LSU coach. A driving rainstorm turned the field into a mud bowl. Bad footing and dropped passes were normal in the first half, and PSU fumbled the snap exchange twice though both were recovered by the offense. Quarterback Daryll Clark finished the game with 216 yards passing and one touchdown pass. LSU signal caller Jordan Jefferson threw for 202 yards and a TD pass, however the Tigers were held to just 41 total yards rushing. Collin Wagner's 21-yard field goal with 57 seconds left sealed the victory for the Nittany Lions.

Joe Paterno picked up his 24th career bowl victory, extending his own NCAA record. The Nittany Lions have won four of their last five bowl games. The field took another pounding after poor conditions hampered the Champs Sports Bowl earlier in the week on the same turf. Eight state high school championship games were also played at the stadium in recent weeks, but the turf was replaced immediately after the high school championships, about three weeks before the Champs Sports Bowl. The grounds crew worked frantically all week in an attempt to get the field in shape for the game.

The two-point margin was the only game this season for Penn State that was decided by fewer than 10 points.

== Rankings ==
Ranking movements Legend: ██ Increase in ranking ██ Decrease in ranking
| | Week | | | | | | | | | | | | | | | |
| Poll | Pre | 1 | 2 | 3 | 4 | 5 | 6 | 7 | 8 | 9 | 10 | 11 | 12 | 13 | 14 | Final |
|---|---|---|---|---|---|---|---|---|---|---|---|---|---|---|---|---|
| AP | 9 | 7 | 5 | 5 | 15 | 14 | 14 | 13 | 12 | 11 | 19 | 13 | 12 | 10 | 11 | 9 |
| Coaches | 8 | 5 | 5 | 4 | 13 | 12 | 13 | 11 | 10 | 10 | 17 | 12 | 11 | 9 | 9 | 8 |
| Harris | Not released | | | | 12 | 13 | 13 | 11 | 10 | 10 | 17 | 12 | 11 | 9 | 9 | Not released |
| BCS | Not released | | | | | | | 13 | 12 | 11 | 18 | 14 | 13 | 11 | 13 | Not released |

== Awards ==
=== Watchlists ===
- NaVorro Bowman
  Lombardi Award watchlist
  Bronko Nagurski Trophy watchlist
  Bednarik Award watchlist and semifinalist
  Butkus Award watchlist
- Daryll Clark
  Johnny Unitas Golden Arm Award candidate
  Davey O'Brien Award watchlist
  Walter Camp Award watchlist
  Maxwell Award watchlist
- Sean Lee
  Lott Trophy watchlist
  Bronko Nagurski Trophy watchlist
  Bednarik Award watchlist
  Lombardi Award watchlist
  Butkus Award watchlist
- Jared Odrick
  Lombardi Award watchlist
  Outland Trophy watchlist
  Bronko Nagurski Trophy watchlist
  Bednarik Award watchlist
- Joe Paterno
  Maxwell Football Club George Munger Award semifinalist
- Evan Royster
  Walter Camp Award watchlist
  Maxwell Award watchlist
  Doak Walker Award watchlist
- Andrew Quarless
  John Mackey Award watchlist
- Stefen Wisniewski
  Outland Trophy watchlist
  Lombardi Award watchlist

=== Players ===
- Jesse Alfreno
  Academic All-Big Ten
- Quinn Barham
  Academic All-Big Ten
- Brandon Beachum
  Academic All-Big Ten
- Jeremy Boone
  Big Ten Special Teams Player of the Week (Oct. 3)
  ESPN The Magazine CoSIDA Academic All-District
  Second-team All-Big Ten
  Academic All-Big Ten
- NaVorro Bowman
  Big Ten Defensive Player of the Week (Nov. 14)
  Big Ten Co-Defensive Player of the Week (Nov. 21)
  First-team All-Big Ten
  ESPN.com All-Big Ten
  CBSSports.com second-team All-American
  Sporting News second-team All-American
  Rivals.com second-team All-American
  Sports Illustrated second-team All-American
  Phil Steele's College Football second-team All-American
  Associated Press third-team All-American
  College Football News third-team All-American
  Pro Football Weekly honorable mention All-American
- Brett Brackett
  Academic All-Big Ten
- Daryll Clark
  Big Ten Co-Offensive Player of the Week (Sept. 5)
  Big Ten Offensive Player of the Week (Sept. 24)
  Big Ten Co-Offensive Player of the Week (Nov. 21)
  First-team All-Big Ten
  ESPN.com All-Big Ten
  Chicago Tribune Silver Football (Big Ten MVP), co-winner
  Pro Football Weekly honorable mention All-American
  ECAC Player of the Year
- Chris Colasanti
  Academic All-Big Ten
- Josh Hull
  ESPN The Magazine CoSIDA Academic All-District
  Second-team All-Big Ten (media)
  First-team ESPN The Magazine CoSIDA Academic All-America
  Academic All-Big Ten
- Dennis Landolt
  First-team All-Big Ten (coaches)
  Associated Press third-team All-American
- Kevion Latham
  Academic All-Big Ten
- Sean Lee
  Big Ten Defensive Player of the Week (Sept. 19)
  Second-team All-Big Ten
  Big Ten Sportsmanship Award
  Academic All-Big Ten
  Pro Football Weekly honorable mention All-American
- Shelton McCullough
  Academic All-Big Ten
- Jared Odrick
  First-team All-Big Ten (coaches)
  Big Ten Defensive Player of the Year (coaches)
  Big Ten Defensive Lineman of the Year (coaches)
  ESPN.com All-Big Ten
  AFCA All-American
  CBSSports.com All-American
  Associated Press second-team All-American
  Rivals.com second-team All-American
  Phil Steele's College Football second-team All-American
  Sporting News third-team All-American
  Pro Football Weekly honorable mention All-American
- Andrew Pitz
  ESPN The Magazine CoSIDA Academic All-District
  First-team ESPN The Magazine CoSIDA Academic All-America
  Academic All-Big Ten
- Evan Royster
  First-team All-Big Ten
  ESPN.com All-Big Ten
- Mickey Shuler
  Academic All-Big Ten
- Matt Stankiewitch
  Academic All-Big Ten
- Nate Stupar
  Academic All-Big Ten
- Stefen Wisniewski
  ESPN The Magazine CoSIDA Academic All-District
  First-team All-Big Ten
  First-team ESPN The Magazine CoSIDA Academic All-America
  Academic All-Big Ten
  ESPN.com All-Big Ten
  College Football News third-team All-American
  Pro Football Weekly honorable mention All-American

=== Other awards ===
2009 Lambert Trophy winner

== Postseason ==
Penn State finished the season ranked number 9 in the final AP poll and number 8 in the final Coaches poll, earning Penn State its 23rd Top 10 finish under Joe Paterno. It's the 35th final top 25 ranking under Paterno.

Following the Capital One Bowl, linebacker NaVorro Bowman announced he would skip his final season of eligibility and declared for the 2010 NFL draft.

Four players were initially invited to the 2010 NFL Scouting Combine, held February 24 to March 2 in Indianapolis, Indiana: Jared Odrick, Sean Lee, Daryll Clark, and Andrew Quarless. NaVorro Bowman and Josh Hull were added to the list of combine invitations on January 29.

=== All-star games ===
| Game | Date | Site | Players |
|---|---|---|---|
| 85th East–West Shrine Game | January 23, 2010 | Florida Citrus Bowl Stadium, Orlando, Florida | Jeremy Boone; Andrew Quarless; Daryll Clark |
| 61st Senior Bowl | January 30, 2010 | Ladd–Peebles Stadium; Mobile, Alabama | Sean Lee*; Jared Odrick |
| 4th Annual Texas vs. The Nation All-Star Challenge | February 6, 2010 | Sun Bowl Stadium; El Paso, Texas | Josh Hull; Dennis Landolt; A.J. Wallace |
* Sean Lee was invited to play in the Senior Bowl but declined.

=== NFL draft ===
| Round | Pick | Overall | Name | Position | Team |
|---|---|---|---|---|---|
| 1st | 28 | 28 | Jared Odrick | Defensive tackle | Miami Dolphins |
| 2nd | 22 | 55 | Sean Lee | Linebacker | Dallas Cowboys |
| 3rd | 27 | 91 | NaVorro Bowman | Linebacker | San Francisco 49ers |
| 5th | 22 | 154 | Andrew Quarless | Tight end | Green Bay Packers |
| 7th | 7 | 214 | Mickey Shuler | Tight end | Minnesota Vikings |
| 7th | 46 | 254 | Josh Hull | Linebacker | St. Louis Rams |

== Notes ==
- Penn State sets a brand new single season attendance record when 856,066 fans pack Beaver Stadium.
