= 2009 Michigan State Spartans football team =

American college football season

2009 Michigan State Spartans football

Alamo Bowl, L 31–41 vs. Texas Tech
- Conference: Big Ten Conference
- Record: 6–7 (4–4 Big Ten)
- Head coach: Mark Dantonio (3rd season)
- Offensive coordinator: Don Treadwell (3rd season)
- Defensive coordinator: Pat Narduzzi (3rd season)
- Home stadium: Spartan Stadium

2009 Big Ten Conference football standings
	Conf.			Overall
Team	W		L	W		L
No. 5 Ohio State $	7	–	1	11	–	2
No. 7 Iowa %	6	–	2	11	–	2
No. 9 Penn State	6	–	2	11	–	2
Northwestern	5	–	3	8	–	5
No. 16 Wisconsin	5	–	3	10	–	3
Michigan State	4	–	4	6	–	7
Purdue	4	–	4	5	–	7
Minnesota	3	–	5	6	–	7
Illinois	2	–	6	3	–	9
Michigan	1	–	7	5	–	7
Indiana	1	–	7	4	–	8
$ – BCS representative as conference champion; % – BCS at-large representative; Rankings from AP Poll

The 2009 Michigan State Spartans football team competed on behalf of the Michigan State University in the 2009 NCAA Division I FBS football season. The Spartans were coached by Mark Dantonio, who was in his third season with the Spartans. Michigan State played their home games in Spartan Stadium in East Lansing, Michigan.

== Recruiting class ==
College recruiting
Name	Hometown	School	Height	Weight	40^{‡}	Commit date
Denicos Allen; LB	Hamilton, Ohio	Hamilton (OH)	6 ft 0 in (1.83 m)	205 lb (93 kg)	4.56	Oct 7, 2008
Denicos Allen; LB	Recruit ratings: Scout: Rivals: (77)					
Edwin Baker; RB	Oak Park, Michigan	Oak Park (MI)	5 ft 10 in (1.78 m)	200 lb (91 kg)	4.40	Feb 26, 2008
Edwin Baker; RB	Recruit ratings: Scout: Rivals: (81)					
David Barrent; OT	West Des Moines, Iowa	Valley (IA)	6 ft 7 in (2.01 m)	285 lb (129 kg)	–	Jul 29, 2008
David Barrent; OT	Recruit ratings: Scout: Rivals: (82)					
Larry Caper; RB	Battle Creek, Michigan	Battle Creek Central (MI)	5 ft 11 in (1.80 m)	220 lb (100 kg)	4.55	Mar 6, 2008
Larry Caper; RB	Recruit ratings: Scout: Rivals: (80)					
Henry Conway; OT	Shaker Heights, Ohio	Shaker Heights (OH)	6 ft 6 in (1.98 m)	300 lb (140 kg)	5.10	Jan 21, 2008
Henry Conway; OT	Recruit ratings: Scout: Rivals: (77)					
Dana Dixon; WR	Detroit, Michigan	Renaissance (MI)	6 ft 3 in (1.91 m)	175 lb (79 kg)	4.55	Jun 20, 2008
Dana Dixon; WR	Recruit ratings: Scout: Rivals: (73)					
Denzel Drone; LB	Plant City, Florida	Plant City (FL)	6 ft 1 in (1.85 m)	225 lb (102 kg)	4.65	Jan 25, 2009
Denzel Drone; LB	Recruit ratings: Scout: Rivals: (68)					
Bennie Fowler; WR	Beverly Hills, Michigan	Detroit Country Day (MI)	6 ft 1 in (1.85 m)	185 lb (84 kg)	4.4	Jul 12, 2008
Bennie Fowler; WR	Recruit ratings: Scout: Rivals: (77)					
Dan France; OT	North Royalton, Ohio	North Royalton (OH)	6 ft 6 in (1.98 m)	270 lb (120 kg)	4.9	Aug 3, 2008
Dan France; OT	Recruit ratings: Scout: Rivals: (73)					
Corey Freeman; DE	University Heights, Ohio	Cleveland Heights (OH)	6 ft 3 in (1.91 m)	235 lb (107 kg)	4.55	Feb 4, 2009
Corey Freeman; DE	Recruit ratings: Scout: Rivals: (40)					
Jeremy Gainer; LB	Livonia, Michigan	Clarenceville (MI)	6 ft 2 in (1.88 m)	210 lb (95 kg)	4.50	Dec 18, 2008
Jeremy Gainer; LB	Recruit ratings: Scout: Rivals: (75)					
Tyquan Hammock; LB	Fort Wayne, Indiana	Bishop Luers (IN)	6 ft 1 in (1.85 m)	215 lb (98 kg)	4.7	Jul 22, 2008
Tyquan Hammock; LB	Recruit ratings: Scout: Rivals: (75)					
Derek Hoebing; TE	Vermilion, Ohio	Vermilion (OH)	6 ft 6 in (1.98 m)	245 lb (111 kg)	4.9	Jul 13, 2008
Derek Hoebing; TE	Recruit ratings: Scout: Rivals: (67)					
Jairus Jones; S	Tampa, Florida	Wharton (FL)	6 ft 1 in (1.85 m)	205 lb (93 kg)	4.60	Jan 31, 2009
Jairus Jones; S	Recruit ratings: Scout: Rivals: (78)					
Nate Klatt; C	Canal Fulton, Ohio	Northwest (OH)	6 ft 4 in (1.93 m)	280 lb (130 kg)	5.4	Jul 7, 2008
Nate Klatt; C	Recruit ratings: Scout: Rivals: (75)					
Andrew Maxwell; QB	Midland, Michigan	Midland (MI)	6 ft 3 in (1.91 m)	185 lb (84 kg)	4.9	Mar 2, 2008
Andrew Maxwell; QB	Recruit ratings: Scout: Rivals: (80)					
Kevin Muma; K	Troy, Michigan	Troy (MI)	5 ft 10 in (1.78 m)	175 lb (79 kg)	–	Jan 19, 2009
Kevin Muma; K	Recruit ratings: Scout: Rivals: (75)					
Chris Norman; LB	Detroit, Michigan	Renaissance (MI)	6 ft 2 in (1.88 m)	220 lb (100 kg)	4.60	Feb 5, 2009
Chris Norman; LB	Recruit ratings: Scout: Rivals: (79)					
Micajah Reynolds; OG	Lansing, Michigan	J.W. Sexton (MI)	6 ft 5 in (1.96 m)	317 lb (144 kg)	5.10	Jun 24, 2008
Micajah Reynolds; OG	Recruit ratings: Scout: Rivals: (77)					
Dion Sims; TE	Orchard Lake, Michigan	St. Mary's Prep (OH)	6 ft 5 in (1.96 m)	230 lb (100 kg)	4.60	Jan 13, 2008
Dion Sims; TE	Recruit ratings: Scout: Rivals: (79)					
Donald Spencer; WR	Ypsilanti, Michigan	Ypsilanti (MI)	6 ft 2 in (1.88 m)	192 lb (87 kg)	4.5	Feb 23, 2008
Donald Spencer; WR	Recruit ratings: Scout: Rivals: (78)					
Blake Treadwell; C	East Lansing, Michigan	East Lansing (MI)	6 ft 3 in (1.91 m)	273 lb (124 kg)	4.90	Mar 16, 2008
Blake Treadwell; C	Recruit ratings: Scout: Rivals: (77)					
Patrick White; WR	Pickerington, Ohio	Pickerington (OH)	5 ft 11 in (1.80 m)	171 lb (78 kg)	4.4	Jun 8, 2008
Patrick White; WR	Recruit ratings: Scout: Rivals: (74)					
Overall recruit ranking: Scout: 37 Rivals: 17
Note: In many cases, Scout, Rivals, 247Sports, On3, and ESPN may conflict in their listings of height and weight.; In these cases, the average was taken. ESPN grades are on a 100-point scale.; Sources: "2009 Team Ranking". Rivals.com.

== Schedule ==
This season saw the Spartans schedule a Division I FCS opponent (Montana State) for the first time since the NCAA split Division I football in 1978. This left Notre Dame, UCLA, USC, and Washington as the only Division I FBS teams to never have played a lower-division opponent since the split.

Date	Time	Opponent	Site	TV	Result	Attendance
September 5	12:00 p.m.	Montana State*	Spartan Stadium; East Lansing, MI	BTN	W 44–3	74,518
September 12	12:00 p.m.	Central Michigan*	Spartan Stadium; East Lansing, Michigan	ESPN2	L 27–29	76,221
September 19	3:30 p.m.	at Notre Dame*	Notre Dame Stadium; Notre Dame, IN (Megaphone Trophy)	NBC	L 30–33	80,795
September 26	12:00 p.m.	at Wisconsin	Camp Randall Stadium; Madison, WI	ESPN	L 30–38	80,123
October 3	12:00 p.m.	No. 22 Michigan	Spartan Stadium; East Lansing, MI (Paul Bunyan Trophy)	BTN	W 26–20 ^{OT}	78,629
October 10	12:00 p.m.	at Illinois	Memorial Stadium; Champaign, IL	BTN	W 24–14	62,870
October 17	12:00 p.m.	Northwestern^{†}	Spartan Stadium; East Lansing, MI	ESPN2	W 24–14	71,726
October 24	7:00 p.m.	No. 6 Iowa	Spartan Stadium; East Lansing, MI	BTN	L 13–15	74,411
October 31	8:00 p.m.	at Minnesota	TCF Bank Stadium; Minneapolis, MN	BTN	L 34–42	50,805
November 7	12:00 p.m.	Western Michigan*	Spartan Stadium; East Lansing, MI	BTN	W 49–14	73,910
November 14	12:00 p.m.	at Purdue	Ross–Ade Stadium; West Lafayette, IN	ESPN	W 40–37	48,408
November 21	3:30 p.m.	No. 14 Penn State	Spartan Stadium; East Lansing, MI (Land Grant Trophy)	ABC/ESPN	L 14–42	73,771
January 2, 2010	9:00 p.m.	vs. Texas Tech*	Alamodome; San Antonio, TX (Alamo Bowl)	ESPN	L 31–41	64,757
*Non-conference game; ^{†}Homecoming; Rankings from AP Poll released prior to the game; All times are in Eastern time

== Personnel ==
2009 Michigan State Spartans football team roster
Players			Coaches
Offense: Pos. / # / Name / Class; QB / 8 / Kirk Cousins / So	Defense: Pos. / # / Name / Class; CB / / Jeremy Ware	Special teams: Pos. / # / Name / Class; K / / Brett Swenson	Head coach: Mark Dantonio; Coordinators/assistant coaches: Don Treadwell – Offenvie Coordinator/Wide Receivers coach; Dave Warner – Quarterbacks coach; Dan Enos – Running backs coach; Mark Staten – Tight ends coach/Tackles/Recruiting Coordinator; Dan Roushar – Offensive line coach; Pat Narduzzi – Defensive Coordinator; Ted Gill – Defensive line coach; Mike Tressel – Linebackers coach/Special Teams Coordinator; Harlon Barnett – Secondary coach; Legend: (C) Team captain; (S) Suspended; (I) Ineligible; Injured; Redshirt

== Game summaries ==
=== Montana State ===
Team	1	2	3	4	Total
Montana State	0	0	3	0	3
• Michigan State	7	21	6	10	44

- Date: September 5
- Location: Spartan Stadium
  East Lansing, MI
- Game start: 12:00 p.m. EDT
- Game attendance: 74,518
- TV announcers (BTN): Dan Gutowsky (Play-by-play), Ron Johnson (Color), & Lisa Byington (Sideline)

=== Central Michigan ===
Team	1	2	3	4	Total
• Central Michigan	3	10	0	16	29
Michigan State	10	7	3	7	27

- Date: September 12
- Location: Spartan Stadium
  East Lansing, MI
- Game start: 12:00 p.m. EDT
- Game attendance: 76,221
- TV announcers (ESPN2): Pam Ward (Play-by-play) & Ray Bentley (Color)

=== Notre Dame ===
Team	1	2	3	4	Total
Michigan State	3	14	6	7	30
• Notre Dame	13	3	10	7	33

- Date: September 19
- Location: Notre Dame Stadium
  Notre Dame, IN
- Game start: 3:30 p.m. EDT
- Game attendance: 80,795
- TV announcers (NBC): Tom Hammond (Play-by-play), Pat Haden (Color), & Alex Flanagan (Sideline)

=== Wisconsin ===
Team	1	2	3	4	Total
Michigan State	0	7	10	13	30
• Wisconsin	7	14	3	14	38

- Date: September 26
- Location: Camp Randall Stadium
  Madison, WI
- Game start: 12:00 p.m. EDT
- Game attendance: 80,123
- TV announcers (ESPN): Dave Pasch (Play-by-play), Bob Griese (Color), & Chris Spielman (Color)

=== Michigan ===
Team	1	2	3	4	OT	Total
Michigan	3	3	0	14	0	20
• Michigan State	7	3	3	7	6	26

- Date: October 3
- Location: Spartan Stadium
  East Lansing, MI
- Game start: 12:00 p.m. EDT
- Game attendance: 78,629
- TV announcers (BTN): Wayne Larrivee (Play-by-play), Chris Martin (Color), & Brent Stover (Sideline)

Scoring summary
1	12:27	Michigan	Jason Olesnavage 36-yard field goal	Michigan 3–0
1	2:25	Michigan St	Larry Caper 1-yard run (Brett Swenson kick)	Michigan St 7–3
2	4:43	Michigan	Jason Olesnavage 42-yard field goal	Michigan St 7–6
2	0:00	Michigan St	Brett Swenson 26-yard field goal	Michigan St 10–6
3	6:09	Michigan St	Brett Swenson 24-yard field goal	Michigan St 13–6
4	14:49	Michigan St	Glenn Winston 15-yard run (Brett Swenson kick)	Michigan St 20–6
4	4:03	Michigan	Darryl Stonum 60-yard pass from Tate Forcier (Jason Olesnavage kick)	Michigan St 20–13
4	0:02	Michigan	Roy Roundtree 9-yard pass from Tate Forcier (Jason Olesnavage kick)	Tie 20–20
OT		Michigan St	Larry Caper 23-yard run	Michigan St 26–20

Michigan came into the game 4–0 (1–0 Big Ten) and ranked #22, looking to reclaim the Paul Bunyan trophy after losing to MSU the previous year. Michigan State dominated the first 55 minutes of regulation, building a 20–6 lead. Michigan rallied with two TDs in the final minutes to send the game to OT, but MSU quickly intercepted a pass and running back Larry Caper rushed 23 yards through multiple tackles for the game-winning score.

=== Illinois ===
Team	1	2	3	4	Total
• Michigan State	14	3	7	0	24
Illinois	0	0	7	7	14

- Date: October 10
- Location: Memorial Stadium
  Champaign, IL
- Game start: 12:00 p.m. EDT
- Game attendance: 62,870
- TV announcers (BTN): Wayne Larrivee (Play-by-play), Chris Martin (Color), & Rebecca Haarlow (Sideline)

=== Northwestern ===
Team	1	2	3	4	Total
Northwestern	0	7	0	7	14
• Michigan State	0	0	17	7	24

- Date: October 17
- Location: Spartan Stadium
  East Lansing, MI
- Game start: 12:00 p.m. EDT
- Game attendance: 71,726
- TV announcers (ESPN2): Pam Ward (Play-by-play) & Ray Bentley (Color)

=== Iowa ===
Team	1	2	3	4	Total
• Iowa	0	3	0	12	15
Michigan State	3	0	3	7	13

- Date: October 24
- Location: Spartan Stadium
  East Lansing, MI
- Game start: 7:00 p.m. EDT
- Game attendance: 74,411
- TV announcers (BTN): Wayne Larrivee (Play-by-play), Chris Martin (Color), & Lisa Byington (Sideline)

Final Seconds: With 2 seconds remaining in the game, on 4th and Goal from the Michigan State 7 and a half yard line, Iowa QB Ricky Stanzi snapped the ball and passed the ball to Iowa WR Marvin McNutt into the end zone as the time expired to win the game.

=== Minnesota ===
Team	1	2	3	4	Total
Michigan State	3	7	21	3	34
• Minnesota	14	7	7	14	42

- Date: October 31
- Location: TCF Bank Stadium
  Minneapolis, MN
- Game start: 8:00 p.m. EDT
- Game attendance: 50,805
- TV announcers (BTN): Wayne Larrivee (Play-by-play), Chris Martin (Color), & Rebecca Haarlow (Sideline)

=== Western Michigan ===
Team	1	2	3	4	Total
Western Michigan	0	0	14	0	14
• Michigan State	21	14	7	7	49

- Date: November 7
- Location: Spartan Stadium
  East Lansing, MI
- Game start: 12:00 p.m. EST
- Game attendance: 73,910
- TV announcers (BTN): Ari Wolfe (Play-by-play), Anthony Herron (Color), & Lisa Byington (Sideline)

=== Purdue ===
Michigan State at Purdue

Team	1	2	3	4	Total
• Michigan State	7	10	6	17	40
Purdue	10	10	7	10	37

- Date: November 14
- Location: Ross–Ade Stadium, West Lafayette, IN
- Game start: 12:00 p.m. EST
- Game attendance: 48,408
- TV announcers (ESPN): Dave Pasch (Play-by-play), Bob Griese (Color), & Chris Spielman (Color)
- Source: ESPN

Scoring summary
1	14:53	MSU	Chris L. Rucker 11-yard fumble return (Brett Swenson kick)	MSU 7–0
1	10:58	PUR	Keith Smith 26-yard pass from Joey Elliott (Carson Wiggs kick)	Tied 7–7
1	3:42	PUR	Carson Wiggs 20-yard field goal	PUR 10–7
2	11:18	PUR	Carson Wiggs 42-yard field goal	PUR 13–7
2	9:59	MSU	Andrew Hawken 4-yard pass from Kirk Cousins (Brett Swenson kick)	MSU 14–13
2	5:47	PUR	Ralph Bolden 9-yard run (Carson Wiggs kick)	PUR 20–14
2	1:49	MSU	Brett Swenson 28-yard field goal	PUR 20–17
3	13:24	MSU	Brett Swenson 52-yard field goal	Tied 20–20
3	4:52	PUR	Cortez Smith 3-yard pass from Joey Elliott (Carson Wiggs kick)	PUR 27–20
3	1:06	MSU	Brett Swenson 52-yard field goal	PUR 27–23
4	11:52	PUR	Ralph Bolden 1-yard run (Carson Wiggs kick)	PUR 34–23
4	11:34	MSU	B.J. Cunningham 73-yard pass from Kirk Cousins (Brett Swenson kick)	PUR 34–30
4	6:59	MSU	Blair White 9-yard pass from Kirk Cousins (Brett Swenson kick)	MSU 37–34
4	2:38	PUR	Carson Wiggs 49-yard field goal	Tied 37–37
4	1:51	MSU	Brett Swenson 21-yard field goal	MSU 40–37

=== Penn State ===
Team	1	2	3	4	Total
• Penn State	0	7	28	7	42
Michigan State	0	7	0	7	14

- Date: November 21
- Location: Spartan Stadium
  East Lansing, MI
- Game start: 3:30 p.m. EST
- Game attendance: 73,771
- TV announcers (ABC/ESPN): Mike Patrick (Play-by-play), Craig James (Color), & Heather Cox (Sideline)

=== Alamo Bowl ===
Team	1	2	3	4	Total
Michigan State	7	7	14	3	31
• Texas Tech	7	13	7	14	41

- Date: January 2
- Location: Alamodome
  San Antonio, TX
- Game start: 9:00 p.m. EST
- Game attendance: 64,757
- TV announcers (ESPN/ESPN Radio): Mike Patrick (Play-by-play), Bob Davie (Color), & Heather Cox (Sideline)/Bill Rosinski (Play-by-play), Dennis Franchione (Color), & Joe Schad (Sideline)

== 2010 NFL draft ==
Only one Spartan was selected in the 2010 NFL draft. However, wide receiver Blair White signed with the Indianapolis Colts as an undrafted free agent.

Player	Round	Pick	Position	NFL team
Jeremy Ware	7	215	Cornerback	Oakland Raiders
