= Evan Royster =

American football player (born 1987)

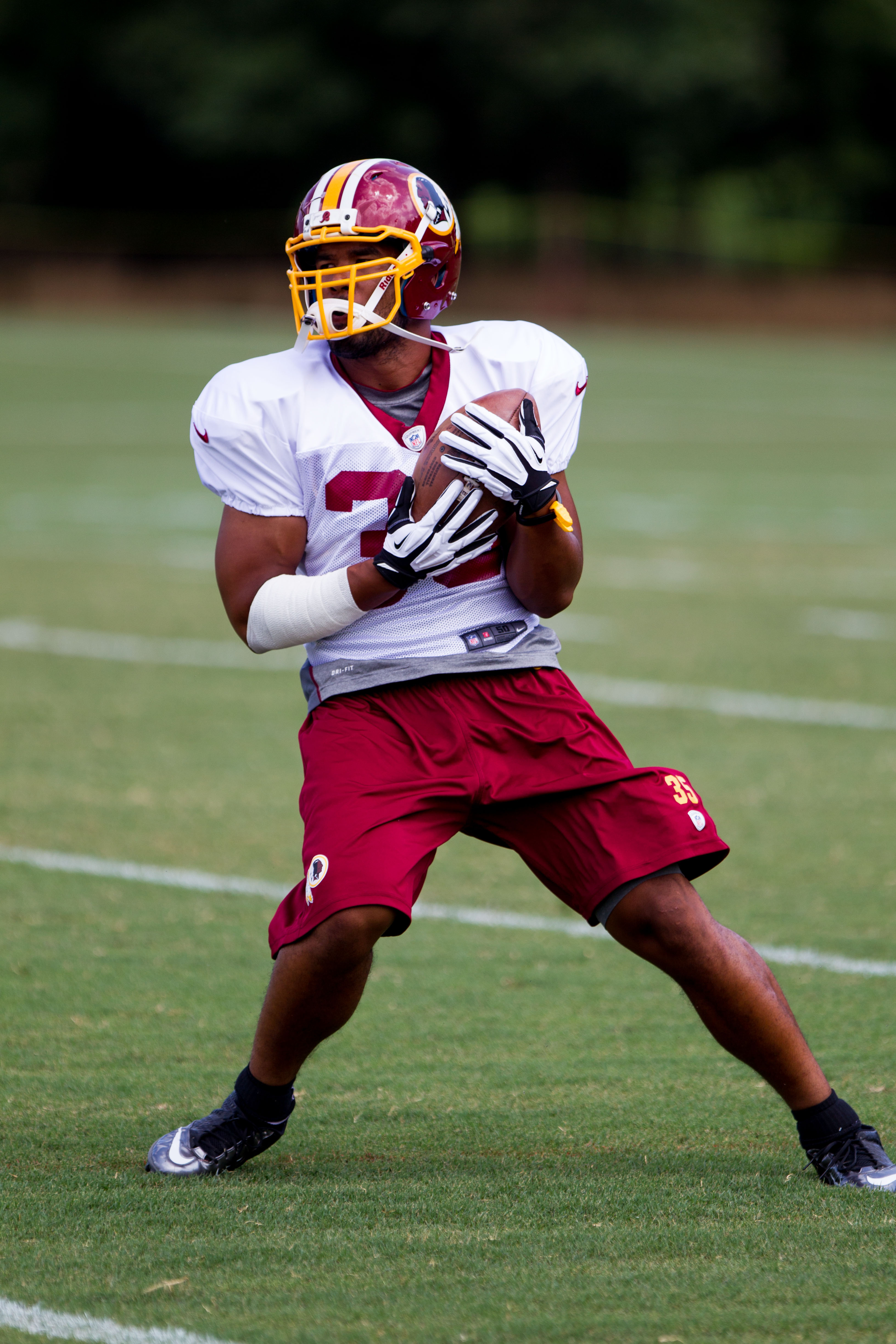
- Royster with the Washington Redskins in 2012

No. 35, 22
- Position: Running back

Personal information
- Born: November 26, 1987 (age 38); Fairfax, Virginia, U.S.
- Listed height: 6 ft 0 in (1.83 m)
- Listed weight: 216 lb (98 kg)

Career information
- High school: Westfield (Chantilly, Virginia)
- College: Penn State
- NFL draft: 2011: 6th round, 177th overall pick

Career history
- Washington Redskins (2011–2013); Atlanta Falcons (2015)*
- * Offseason or practice squad member only

Awards and highlights
- First-team All-Big Ten (2009); 2× Second-team All-Big Ten (2008, 2010)

Career NFL statistics
- Rushing attempts: 81
- Rushing yards: 416
- Rushing touchdowns: 2
- Receptions: 25
- Receiving yards: 180
- Stats at Pro Football Reference

Evan Mathias Royster (born November 26, 1987) is an American former professional football player who was a running back in the National Football League (NFL). He was selected in the sixth round of the 2011 NFL draft by the Washington Redskins, where he played for three seasons. He played college football for the Penn State Nittany Lions as a three-year starter and an all-time leading rusher.

== Early life ==
Royster attended Westfield High School in Chantilly, Virginia, where he totalled 6,384 yards on 750 carries (8.5 avg.) and 90 touchdowns and helped Westfield win three Concorde District Championships. As a sophomore, he ran for 1,690 yards and 22 touchdowns leading Westfield to their first state championship in school history. He added 2,160 yards and 30 touchdowns in his junior year. During his senior year, Royster amassed 2,200 rushing yards and again tallied 30 touchdowns. He was a first-team all-state selection and The Washington Post first-team All-Met.

Regarded as a three-star recruit by Rivals.com, Royster was listed as the #26 running back prospect in the class of 2006. He chose Penn State over offers from Maryland, Nebraska, and Virginia Tech.

While at Westfield High School, Royster was one of the most coveted lacrosse prospects in the country. He scored 33 goals as a senior and played in the prestigious North-South All-American Lacrosse all-star game. He was heavily recruited by traditional lacrosse powerhouses such as Virginia and Johns Hopkins.

Royster became the second player in Westfield Bulldog football history to have his jersey retired. The Bulldogs retired Royster's #24 jersey during halftime of a 2012 game when the Bulldogs went up against Fairfax High School Rebels. Royster's #24 was second to Eddie Royal's #5 when Royal had his jersey retired in 2009 when the Bulldogs went up against the Chantilly High School Chargers.

== College career ==
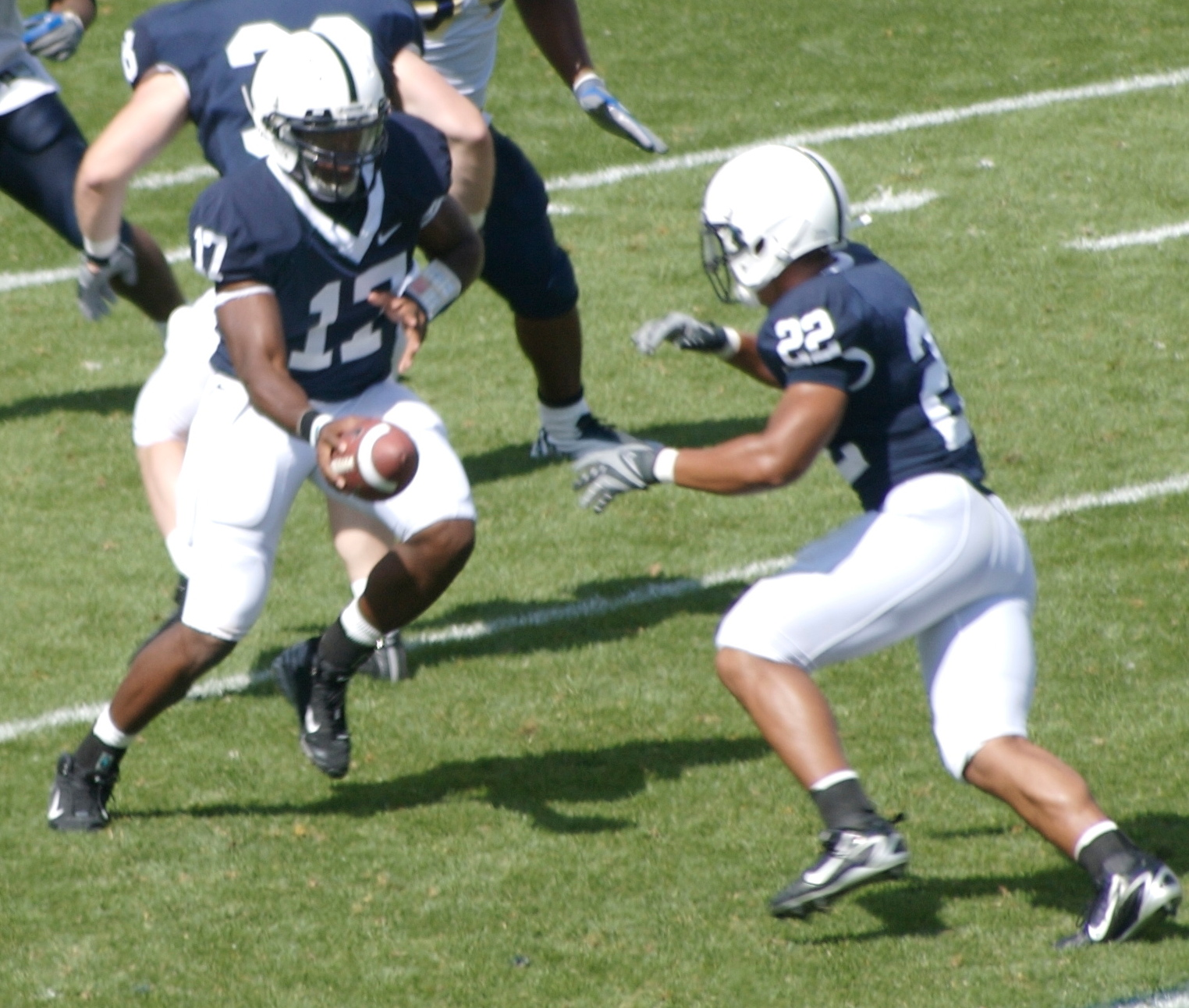
Royster getting the ball handed off to him from Daryll Clark in 2007.

Royster redshirted during his freshmen year at Pennsylvania State University. Royster, recruited out of Virginia, chose Penn State over other NCAA Football Bowl Subdivision (formerly known as Division I-A) programs across the country like the Virginia Tech Hokies, the Nebraska Cornhuskers, the Florida Gators and the Maryland Terrapins.

Royster made his college football debut on September 1, 2007, against the FIU Golden Panthers with eight carries for 70 yards and a touchdown. He played a significant role in the Penn State offense for the 2007 season. He was the second leading rusher behind Rodney Kinlaw, rushing for 513 yards on 82 carries for a 5.3 yards per carry average. He scored the Nittany Lions' last go-ahead touchdown in the third quarter of the 2007 Alamo Bowl against the Texas A&M Aggies on a 38-yard carry.

Royster made his season debut against the Coastal Carolina Chanticleers on August 30, 2008, at Beaver Stadium. Royster and the offense helped guide the Nittany Lions to a 66-10 defeat of Division I FCS Chanticleers. Royster saw limited action in the rout. He had 64 yards on eight carries for a career-high three touchdowns. Royster was pulled from the game following his third touchdown at the beginning of the third quarter when Coach Paterno sat all his starters in favor of the backups. In the following game, against the Oregon State Beavers, Royster put up 141 yards on 17 carries. He added three touchdowns in the 45-14 blowout win before being taken out of the game. He was named the Big Ten Co-Offensive player of the week. Royster had his second straight 100-yard game against the Syracuse Orange on September 13, 2008. He gained 101 yards on 13 carries in the 55-13 victory. On September 27, Royster picked up 139 yards on 19 carries in Penn State's 38-24 win over Illinois. In the following game, Royster powered Penn State past Purdue with 141 yards and a touchdown on 18 carries. He added 53 receiving yards on four catches. Against the Michigan Wolverines (who had beaten Penn State nine straight times leading into the October 17 tilt), Royster set a career rushing high. Royster ran for 174 yards on 18 carries, with a 44-yard touchdown run in the first quarter. He added three catches for 13 yards in the 46-17 homecoming victory. Royster finished the 2008 season with 191 carries for 1,236 rushing yards and 12 rushing touchdowns to go along with 17 receptions for 155 receiving yards in 13 games.

In the third game of the 2009 season, against Temple, Royster rushed 19 times for 134 yards in the 31–6 victory. On October 3, against Illinois, he recorded 105 yards on 17 carries and a touchdown in the 35–17 victory. In three games against Minnesota, Michigan, and Northwestern, he recorded at least 100 rushing yards in each, all victories. Following Penn State's victory at the 2010 Capital One Bowl over LSU, Royster announced that he would forgo the 2010 NFL draft and play his senior year at Penn State.

On September 25, 2010, Royster had 26 carries for 187 rushing yards in the 22–13 victory over Temple. On October 30, he had 29 carries for 150 rushing yards and two rushing touchdowns against Michigan in the 41–31 victory. In the following game, against Northwestern, he had 25 carries for 134 rushing yards to go along with a receiving touchdown in the 35–21 victory. Royster completed his senior season as Penn State's all-time leading rusher having passed Curt Warner's nearly 30-year-old record during the Michigan game. He completed the season with 1,014 rushing yards, making him the only Penn State running back with three 1,000+ yard seasons. His career totals amounted to 3,932 yards on 686 carries, with 29 rushing touchdowns.

Royster was selected to play in the 86th East-West Shrine Game played on January 22, 2011, at the Citrus Bowl Stadium in Orlando, Florida.

=== College statistics ===
Year	Team	Rushing				Receiving		
Year	Team	Att	Yards	Average	TDs	Receptions	Yards	TDs
2006	Penn State	Redshirt						
2007	Penn State	82	513	6.3	5	3	18	0
2008	Penn State	191	1,236	6.5	12	17	155	0
2009	Penn State	205	1,169	5.7	6	16	187	2
2010	Penn State	208	1,014	4.9	6	25	202	1
Career		686	3,932	5.7	29	61	562	3

== Professional career ==
Pre-draft measurables
Height	Weight	Arm length	Hand span	Wingspan	40-yard dash	10-yard split	20-yard split	20-yard shuttle	Three-cone drill	Vertical jump	Broad jump	Bench press
5 ft 11 5/8 in (1.82 m)	212 lb (96 kg)	30 3/4 in (0.78 m)	9 1/4 in (0.23 m)	6 ft 1 1/8 in (1.86 m)	4.53 s	1.58 s	2.61 s	4.18 s	6.78 s	34.0 in (0.86 m)	9 ft 5 in (2.87 m)	20 reps
All values from NFL Combine/Pro Day

=== Washington Redskins ===
==== 2011 season ====
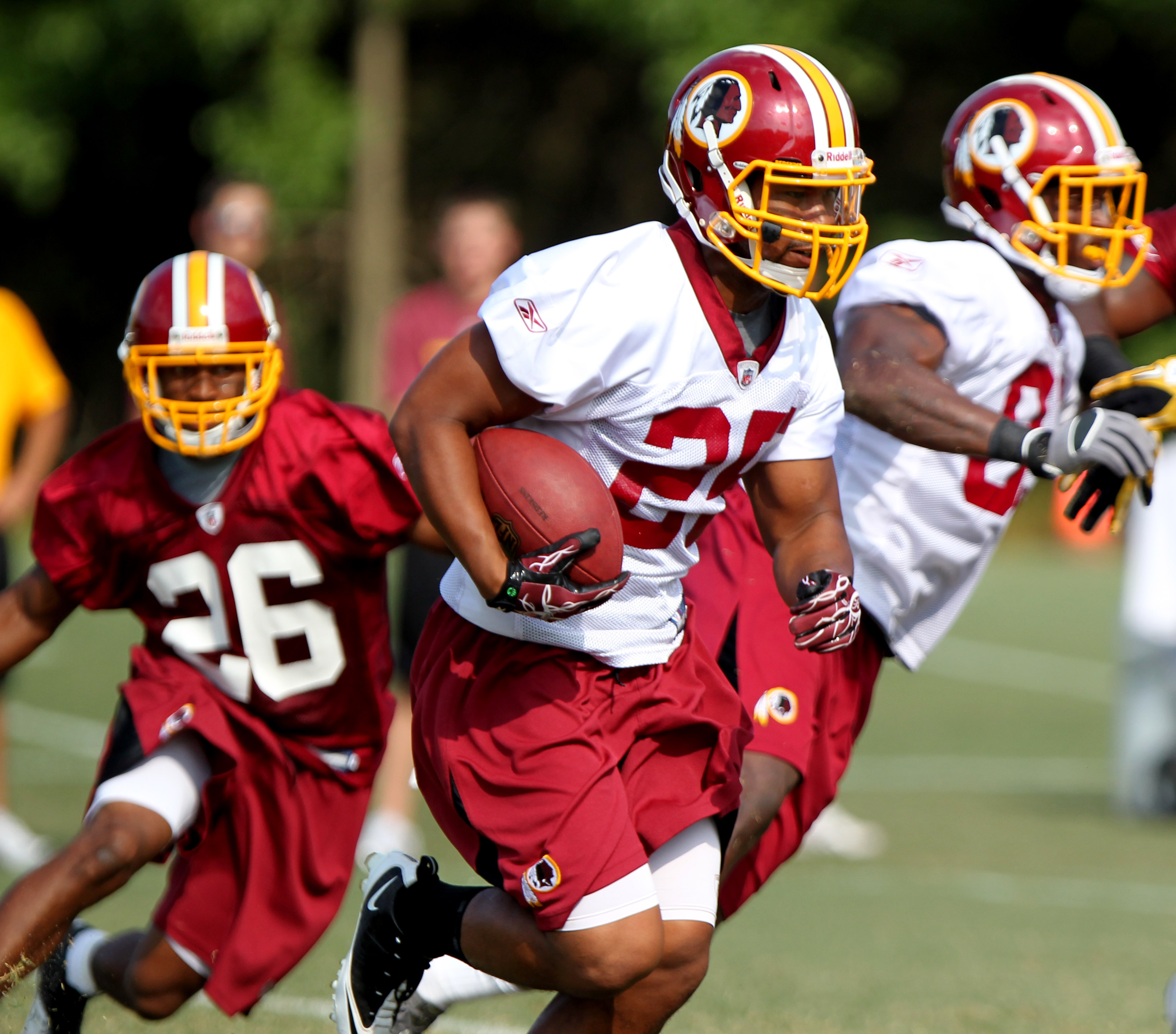
Royster (center) at Redskins training camp in 2011.

Royster was selected in the sixth round with the 177th overall pick in the 2011 NFL draft by the Washington Redskins. He was expected to compete with former Redskins' running back, Ryan Torain, and fellow 2011 Redskins' draftee, Roy Helu, but Royster did not make the 53-man roster and was cut on September 3. On September 4, 2011, Royster was signed to the practice squad. He was elevated to the Redskins active roster on November 22, 2011, when the Redskins waived Tashard Choice following Tim Hightower's season-ending injury. In Week 12 against the Seattle Seahawks, Royster made his NFL debut. Royster would have his first career start in Week 16 against the Minnesota Vikings, getting 132 yards on only 19 carries. In Week 17 against the Philadelphia Eagles, Royster recorded 113 yards on 20 carries while suffering rib injuries. At the end of his rookie season, Royster recorded 328 yards on 56 carries making him the second leader in rushing yards behind fellow rookie, Roy Helu, and beating the original starting running back, Tim Hightower.

==== 2012 season ====
Royster was expected to compete for the starting spot in the 2012 season against Roy Helu and Tim Hightower, but lost the competition to rookie Alfred Morris. Before starting the season, he changed his jersey number to 22, his college jersey number. He scored his first career touchdown in Week 9 against the Carolina Panthers. In the Week 15 win over the Cleveland Browns, he scored his second career touchdown. He appeared in all 16 games. He had 23 carries for 88 rushing yards and two rushing touchdowns to go along with 15 receptions for 109 receiving yards in the 2012 season.

==== 2013 season ====
With the return of Helu, Royster was made the third-string running back and played more on special teams. He was placed on injured reserve after suffering a high ankle sprain after the Week 14 loss to the Kansas City Chiefs.

==== 2014 season ====
The Redskins released Royster on August 30, 2014, for final roster cuts before the start of the 2014 season, losing the third-string running back position to former Penn State teammate, Silas Redd.

=== Atlanta Falcons ===
Royster signed with the Atlanta Falcons on August 16, 2015. He was waived/injured by the Falcons on August 26, 2015. On the following day, he cleared waivers and was reverted to the Falcons' injured reserve list.

== Personal life ==
On May 30, 2014, Evan married his longtime girlfriend Jaclyn McDonald and now resides in Leesburg, VA along with their son, Roman. Evan became certified as an Accredited Asset Management Specialist (AAMS) in 2020 and attained his Certified Financial Planner (CFP) certification in 2024. In early 2025, he was appointed Vice President, Truist Wealth, at Truist Investment Services in Alexandria, VA.

Evan is the younger brother of former Parade All-American and Stanford wide receiver Brandon Royster. He is also the younger brother of Cosmo's 2008 Virginia Bachelor Kyle Royster.
