= Stephfon Green =

American gridiron football player (born 1989)

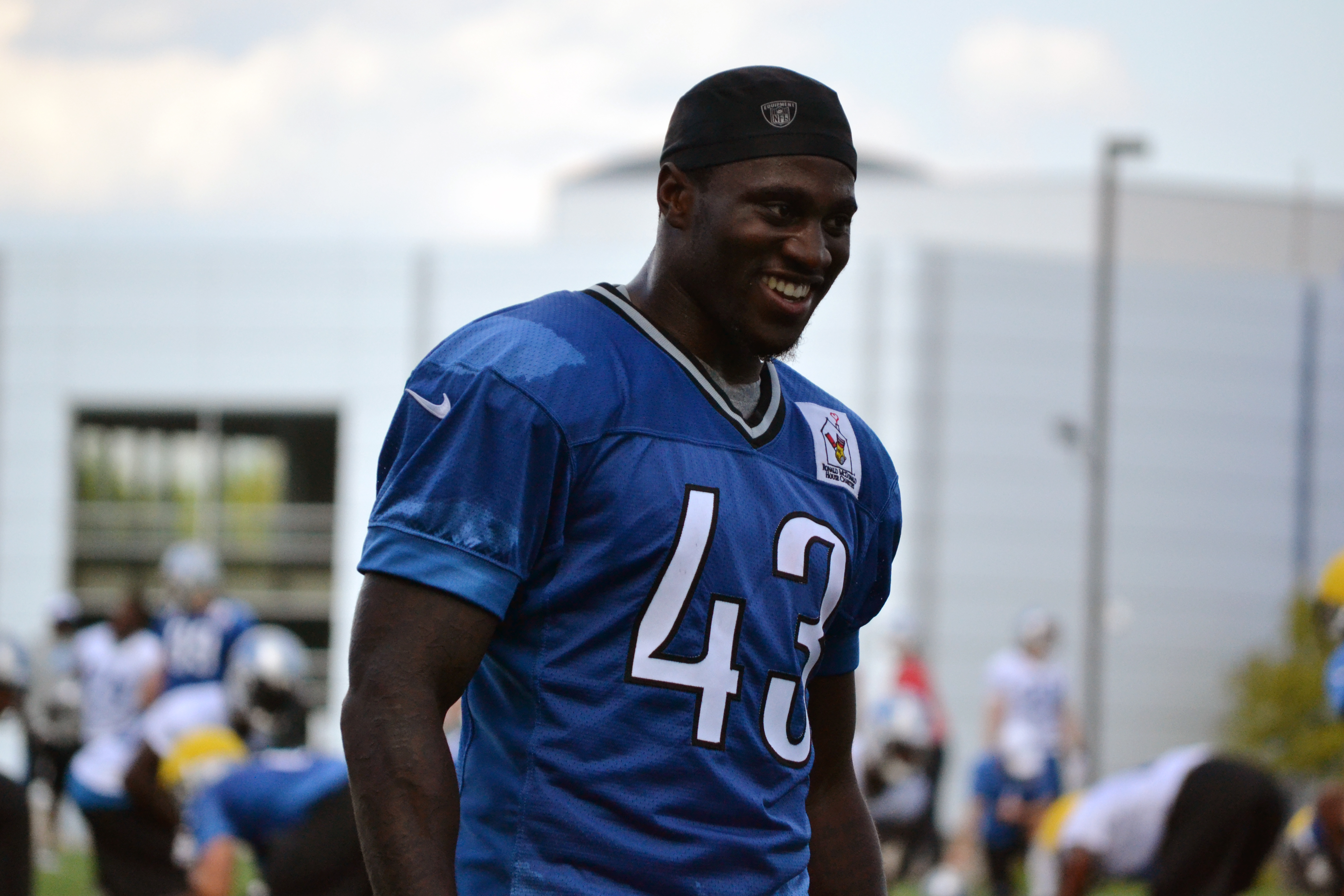
- Roughriders running back Stephfon Green

No. 43
- Position: Running back

Personal information
- Born: May 28, 1989 (age 37); Bronx, New York
- Listed height: 5 ft 10 in (1.78 m)
- Listed weight: 197 lb (89 kg)

Career information
- College: Penn State
- NFL draft: 2012: undrafted

Career history
- Detroit Lions (2012)*; Saskatchewan Roughriders (2012–2013)
- * Offseason or practice squad member only

Stephfon P. Green (born May 28, 1989) is an American former football running back.

== Early life ==
Green attended John F. Kennedy High School in the Bronx where he was coached by Alex Vega. He played tailback and safety and was named as a first team All-Conference selection. During his senior season, he appeared in only the first 5 games, but took advantage of his opportunities as he rushed for 740 yards and 10 touchdowns on just 50 carries, averaging 14.8 yards per carry. On defense, he recorded 21 tackles and two interceptions. In a game against Lincoln High School (Brooklyn), he had 330 yards rushing and 5 touchdowns on only 6 carries for an incredible 55 yard average per carry and a long of 86 yards. Two games later he had a 95-yard run. His senior season was cut short the following week against South Shore when he broke his right ankle.

In his junior year, Green appeared in nine games and rushed for more than 1,000 yards and 13 touchdowns. As a kick returner, he returned kickoffs for two touchdowns and added two interceptions on defense.

He was recruited by Michigan State, Rutgers and Syracuse, but committed to attend Penn State in July 2006. He was rated as a 3 star prospect, and the 38th ranked cornerback in the country.

== College career ==
Green is majoring in crime, law and justice. He has said, “I always tell everybody, and they get surprised when I say that, but football is my Plan B. I’m here on a scholarship, but at the same time, I’m getting a free education, so I’m going to take advantage of that. ” He is a charter member of the Eta Alpha chapter of Iota Phi Theta fraternity.

=== 2007 season ===
Stephfon Green was recruited by Penn State as a defensive back, but soon after arriving, coaches determined that his speed was better suited for the tailback position. He has been clocked at 4.25 seconds in the 40-yard dash.

Green redshirted his freshman season at Penn State and practiced mostly with the scout team on offense as the Lions had Austin Scott, Rodney Kinlaw and Evan Royster at tailback.

=== 2008 season ===
Stephfon had a strong preseason for the Nittany Lions. He led the team in rushing in the annual Blue-White spring game, rushing 12 times for 87 yards. In the second play from scrimmage he ran 57 yards for a touchdown.

Green appeared in all 13 games for the Nittany Lions in 2008, including the Rose Bowl against Southern California. He has shown big play ability, having a rush or reception of at least 10 yards in 11 of the 13 games. In the first game of his college career, he scored two touchdowns in a 66–10 blowout win against Coastal Carolina. His first 100+ yard rushing game came against Temple where he ran for 132 yards on 9 carries, including a 69-yard touchdown. Against Michigan, he turned a screen pass into a career long 80-yard touchdown reception, helping Penn State defeat the Wolverines for the first time since 1996.

Green was one of the bright spots for the Nittany Lion offense in the 2009 Rose Bowl. He racked up 124 yards from scrimmage on 15 touches against a stingy USC defense. However, in the second quarter, he fumbled the ball just before halftime that led to a touchdown pass by Mark Sanchez. He has used the fumble as motivation to improve and takes blame for the Rose Bowl loss, saying "We were gaining momentum, and I just let the momentum slip away. That was a letdown to my team, and I don’t ever want to have my teammates look at me as a letdown."

In the second half of the Rose Bowl, he suffered a dislocated ankle. The injury required surgery which he had in January 2009 and was out of action for over 3 months, missing all of spring practice and the Blue-White game.

=== 2009 season ===
Green entered the 2009 season 2nd on the depth chart behind starter Evan Royster. He scored his first touchdown of the season against Temple in week 3. Two weeks later against Illinois, he ran for a season high 120 yards on 13 carries, including a 52-yard touchdown run early in the 2nd quarter. He added his third touchdown of the season the following week in a 52–3 rout of Eastern Illinois.

In week 7 against Minnesota, he suffered another injury to his right ankle. He had previously broke his right ankle during his senior season in high school, causing him to miss the rest of the season. He also dislocated the same ankle during the 2009 Rose Bowl, which resulted in him missing all of spring football for the Nittany Lions.

After missing games against Michigan and Northwestern, Green returned for the Ohio State game, but was limited to just two carries and one reception as the Nittany Lions were soundly defeated by the Buckeyes 24–7. In the Capital One Bowl against LSU on New Year's Day, Green rushed seven times for 35 yards as Penn State won 19–17.

== Professional career ==
The Detroit Lions signed Stephfon Green as an undrafted free agent. On August 27, 2012, Green was cut by the Detroit Lions. He subsequently signed to the Lions practice squad on September 1, 2012. He was than released on September 18, 2012.

On November 1, 2012, the Saskatchewan Roughriders of the Canadian Football League signed Green. He was released by the Roughriders on June 17, 2013.

== Personal life ==
Green has said that if he doesn't get a chance to play football professionally, he would like to be an FBI agent. He wears jersey number 21 in honor of his favorite athlete, LaDainian Tomlinson. He recently had a daughter born in January 2012.

== Career stats ==
Regular Season			Rushing					Receiving				
Season	Team	GP	Att	Yds	Avg	Lg	TD	Rec	Yds	Avg	Lg	TD
2008	Penn State	13	105	578	5.5	69	4	15	268	17.9	80	1
2009	Penn State	11	71	319	4.5	52	3	6	80	13.3	31	0
2010	Penn State	11	48	128	3.9	21	1	9	78	8.7	26	0
2011	Penn State	8	61	266	4.4	-	6	11	27	2.5	-	0
Total	4 seasons	43	285	1351	4.7	69	14	41	453	11.0	80	1
