= 2009 Insight Bowl =

- 21st Insight Bowl
Minnesota Golden Gophers	Iowa State Cyclones
(6–6)	(6–6)
Big Ten	Big 12
13	14
Head coach: Tim Brewster	Head coach: Paul Rhoads
	1	2	3	4	Total
Minnesota	3	0	10	0	13
Iowa State	0	14	0	0	14
- Date: December 31, 2009
- Season: 2009
- Stadium: Sun Devil Stadium
- Location: Tempe, Arizona
- MVP: Alexander Robinson (RB, Iowa St.) & Christopher Lyle (DE, Iowa St.)
- Referee: Michael Batlan (Pac-10)
- Attendance: 45,090
- Payout: US$1,200,000 per team

United States TV coverage
- Network: NFL Network (simulcast on WOI-DT in Ames/Des Moines, Iowa)
- Announcers: Paul Burmeister, Mike Mayock and Stacey Dales
- Nielsen ratings: 0.4

The 2009 Insight Bowl was the 21st edition of the Insight Bowl, a college football bowl game, played at Sun Devil Stadium in Tempe, Arizona. The game matched the Iowa State Cyclones against the Minnesota Golden Gophers and kicked off at 6:00 p.m. US EST on Thursday, December 31, 2009. The game was telecast on the NFL Network and simulcast in Iowa State's home market (Ames/Des Moines, Iowa) by WOI-DT, the ABC affiliate formerly owned by the university.

The game marked the Cyclones' first postseason trip since 2005, and Minnesota's third Insight Bowl appearance in the last four years. The Gophers lost in 2008 to Kansas and in 2006 to Texas Tech. Iowa State played in the 2000 Insight Bowl, beating Pittsburgh 37–29. Cyclones first-year coach Paul Rhoads turned around a team that finished 2–10 in 2008 and was winless in eight Big 12 games. Iowa State's last bowl appearance was a 27–24 loss to TCU in the 2005 Houston Bowl, now the Texas Bowl.

Given the relative close proximity between them, the two schools have played each other a total of 25 times. Minnesota has dominated the matchup holding the series lead 22–2–1 until the bowl game. However, only one of the games has been played in Iowa and the two teams have only played each other three times since 1924, due to the discontinuation of the series after the controversial death of Jack Trice (the first African-American to play for the then Big 6 Conference), which was caused by the injuries he suffered during the 1923 game between these two teams. The last meeting between the opponents was a 53–29 Gophers victory in 1997. This was the first bowl game played between the two schools.

== Game summary ==
The Gophers were paced by receiver Da'Jon McKnight, who led both teams with seven catches for 124 yards. With only a few minutes remaining in the fourth quarter, Minnesota head coach Tim Brewster replaced starting quarterback Adam Weber with backup MarQueis Gray in order to run a play out of the Wildcat formation, in which the Gophers had used Gray with some success during the regular season. While running a bootleg play, Gray fumbled the ball at the Iowa State 15-yard line; the fumble was recovered by Iowa State defensive back Ter'ran Benton, preventing Minnesota from taking a late fourth-quarter lead with either a field goal or a touchdown, and allowing Iowa State to run out the clock.

Iowa State quarterback Austen Arnaud threw for 216 yards and a touchdown, adding 77 rushing yards and an additional touchdown and tallying a passer rating of 140.2, as the Cyclones got their first bowl win since the 2004 Independence Bowl. Weber finished the day with 261 passing yards, one touchdown, one interception, and a passer rating of 128.8.

The game was Minnesota's third straight bowl loss, a streak that eventually extended to seven before the Gophers defeated Central Michigan in the 2015 Quick Lane Bowl. The game was also Minnesota's third straight loss in the Insight Bowl in particular, a new record for that bowl.

=== Scoring summary ===
Scoring Play	Score
1st Quarter
MN — Eric Ellestad 36-yard field goal, 8:31	MN 3–0
2nd Quarter
IS — Austen Arnaud 9-yard rush (Grant Mahoney kick), 4:35	IS 7–3
IS — Arnaud 38-yard pass to Jake Williams (Mahoney kick), 0:23	IS 14–3
3rd Quarter
MN — Adam Weber 23-yard pass to Nick Tow-Arnett (Ellestad kick), 5:22	IS 14–10
MN — Ellestad 21-yard field goal, 0:21	IS 14–13
4th Quarter
No Scoring	IS 14–13
