= Michigan–Penn State football rivalry =

American college football rivalry

- Michigan Wolverines Penn State Nittany Lions
- First meeting: October 16, 1993; Michigan 21–13
- Latest meeting: October 17, 2026; Michigan 21–18
- Next meeting: 2027

Statistics
- Total meetings: 28
- All-time series: Michigan leads, 18–10
- Largest victory: Michigan, 49–10 (2016)
- Longest win streak: Michigan 9, (1997–2007)
- Current win streak: Michigan 4, (2021–present)

Locations of Michigan and Penn State

The Michigan–Penn State football rivalry is an American college football game between the Wolverines of the University of Michigan and the Nittany Lions of Pennsylvania State University. Michigan leads the series 18–10.

== Series history ==
=== Early history and Lloyd Carr era ===
Penn State joined the Big Ten Conference for the 1993 season. Prior to 1993, the Michigan and Penn State programs had not played a game against each other. In the first game on October 16, 1993, No. 18 Michigan upset No. 7 Penn State, 21–13. In 1994, both teams were ranked in the top five nationally with Penn State prevailing by a 31–24 score; the Nittany Lions finished the 1994 season undefeated and ranked No. 2.

Lloyd Carr replaced Gary Moeller as the head coach of Michigan in 1995. After Penn State won the next two meetings, Carr secured his first win against Penn State a 34–8 win in 1997. Michigan finished that season undefeated on route to winning The Big Ten Conference and the 1998 Rose Bowl and were named national champions by the Associated Press. The 1998 meeting saw Michigan rout Penn State, 27–0, resulting in the first shutout win of the series and Penn State's first shutout loss since 1987.

Penn State had started the 1999 season 9–0 and were ranked as high as second in the AP poll until a 24–23 loss to Minnesota in week ten. Prior to the game against Penn State, Michigan had started the season 5–0 before suffering consecutive losses to Michigan State and Illinois. However, the Wolverines had won two games on the bounce to take their season record to 7–2 before the meeting with Penn State in mid-November. Despite trailing by ten points with less than ten minutes remaining in the game, Michigan came back to win 31–27.

The 2002 edition was the first in the series to go into overtime. With the score tied at 21 after four quarters, Penn State kicked a field goal during its overtime Michigan running back Chris Perry scored a two yard rushing touchdown to secure the 27–24 win for the Wolverines.

After a two season hiatus in the series, the programs faced each other on October 15, 2005. Penn State came into the game undefeated with a 6–0 season record and were ranked at number eight in the AP poll. Michigan headed into the game unranked after accumulating a 3–3 season record. Although Penn State entered the game as favorites, Michigan quarterback Chad Henne threw a touchdown pass to wide receiver Mario Manningham in the final moments of the game to claim a 27–25 win for the Wolverines. Despite the loss to Michigan, Penn State finished the season with an 11–1 season record whilst also winning a share of The Big Conference and claimed a win at the 2006 Orange Bowl. The two sides next met in 2006, this time with the Wolverines entering at 6–0. and ranked fourth in the AP poll. Penn State entered the game unranked after starting the season 4–2. Michigan secured a 17–10 win after a strong defensive performance in which they recorded seven sacks. Michigan remained undefeated until a week eleven 42–39 loss to a top-ranked Ohio State, ultimately finishing 11–2 after a loss in the 2007 Rose Bowl. Michigan won its ninth straight meeting in 2007; after a close opening three quarters, Michigan running back Mike Hart scored a one yard rushing touchdown to seal a 14–9 win.

=== Head coaching changes at both schools ===
Carr retired at the end of the 2007 season after spending 13 seasons as head coach of Michigan. He compiled a 9–2 record against Penn State. Former West Virginia head coach Rich Rodriguez was named to replace Carr as head coach of Michigan. Rodriguez' first game against Penn State was on October 18, 2008. Michigan arrived at the game unranked after a rough 2–4 start to the season. Penn State entered the game ranked third in the country after a 7–0 start. Penn State ended their nine game losing streak to Michigan with a decisive 46–17 win. Penn State ended the season with an 11–2 record which culminated in a loss to USC in the 2009 Rose Bowl. Michigan finished the season with a 3–9 record which represented the program's first losing season since 1967 and the most losses for a season in the history of the program.

Penn State had a second straight blowout win in 2009, as quarterback Daryll Clark threw three touchdown passes to wide receiver Graham Zug to lead the Nittany Lions to a 35–10 victory.

Rodreiguez was dismissed following another disappointing season in 2010. Former San Diego State head coach Brady Hoke would replace Rodriguez as head coach of Michigan. Hoke went 11–2 in his first season as head coach, which concluded with a 23–20 overtime win over Virginia Tech at the 2012 Sugar Bowl. During the 2011 season, Joe Paterno was fired as head coach of Penn State after 46 seasons. Paterno's dismissal and eventual cleaning house was centred around the public perception of the administration's handlings of the Penn State child sex abuse scandal and the arrest of former Penn State assistant coach Jerry Sandusky. Paterno had a 6–10 record against Michigan, and was replaced by former New England Patriots assistant coach Bill O'Brien.

The teams' 2013 meeting was their second to go into overtime. With the scores level at 34–34 after four quarters and 37–37 after three overtime periods, Michigan started the fourth overtime with a field goal, but Penn State running back Bill Belton responded with a 2-yard touchdown run to seal a 43–40 wins.

=== Bill O'Brien leaves Penn State ===
On January 2, 2014, it was announced that Bill O'Brien would leave his role as head coach of Penn State to become head coach of the Houston Texans. On January 11, 2014, it was revealed that Vanderbilt head coach James Franklin would replace the outgoing O'Brien as head coach of Penn State. Michigan had started the 2014 season with a 2–4 record which included a heavy 31–0 defeat at number sixteen Notre Dame in week two. Penn State had started the season with a 5–1 record ahead of their meeting with Michigan on October 11, 2014. Michigan ended their four game losing streak to Penn State with a 18–13 win in which they kept their opponents scoreless in the second half of the game. Despite the win against Penn State, Michigan would go on to lose three of their remaining five games and finished the season with a 5–7 record. Franklin’s first season as head coach of Penn State ended with a 7–6 record. The season concluded with a 31–30 overtime win against Boston College at the 2014 Pinstripe Bowl.

=== Harbaugh vs Franklin ===
On December 2, 2014, Brady Hoke was fired as head coach of Michigan after four seasons. During his time as head coach of Michigan, Hoke's total record was 31–20, which included a 1–1 record in games against Penn State. On December 30, 2014, it was announced that former Stanford and San Francisco 49ers head coach Jim Harbaugh would become the new head coach of the Wolverines. Harbaugh had previously played as a quarterback for Michigan from 1983 to 1986. The 2015 edition of the game was played on November 21, 2015. The Nittany Lions came into the game with a 7–3 record, which included a week seven loss to number one ranked Ohio State. Michigan entered the matchup ranked number fourteen after starting the season with an 8–2 record. Michigan quarterback Jake Rudock threw for two hundred and fifty six yards as the Wolverines sealed a 28–16 victory. Michigan would go on to finish the season with a 10–3 record, which concluded with a 41–7 victory over number nineteen Florida at the 2016 Citrus Bowl. Following the loss to Michigan, Penn State would lose their remaining two games of the season as they finished with a 7–6 record, with the final game of the season being a 24–17 loss to Georgia in the 2016 TaxSlayer Bowl.

In the 2016 game, Michigan scored six rushing touchdowns in a 49–10 win. Despite the early season loss to Michigan, Penn State went on win their remaining eight games and qualify for the Big Ten Championship Game as Michigan suffered two late losses. Penn State defeated Wisconsin to win its first Big Ten title since 2008. The Nittany Lions would go on to finish the season with an 11–3 record after suffering a 52–49 defeat in the 2017 Rose Bowl against number nine ranked USC.

The 2017 meeting saw Penn State quarterback Trace McSorley score three rushing touchdowns as the Lions secured a dominant 42–13 victory. The Wolverines avenged this loss with a blowout 42–7 win the next year.

Penn State went on to win the next two meetings in 2019 and 2020. However, the 2021 season saw Michigan rise in the rankings. Coming into the matchup with an 8–1 record, Michigan quarterback Cade McNamara threw for three touchdowns as he guided the Wolverines to a close 21–17 win. Michigan went on to win its first Big Ten title since 2004 and qualified for its first College Football Playoff.

The 2022 contest saw both teams ranked in the top ten, as No. 5 Michigan and No. 10 Penn State both entered with 5–0 records. After a close first half in which the teams traded leads, Penn State led 17–16 early in the second half. However, Michigan running backs Blake Corum and Donovan Edwards each scored two touchdowns as the Wolverines pulled for a dominant 41–17 victory. Michigan went on to win the Big Ten title and qualify for a second straight College Football Playoff.

In 2023, hours before the game, the Big Ten suspended Harbaugh for the remainder of the regular season. Michigan named Sherrone Moore interim head coach. In a ground and pound game, Michigan prevailed 24-15 en route to a 15-0 season and a national championship.

=== Future of the series ===
On October 4, 2023, the Big Ten announced future football opponents for the 2024 to 2028 seasons with the addition of four schools to conference and the removal of divisions. While some series were maintained on an annual basis as "protected rivalries," including Michigan's rivalries with Michigan State and Ohio State, this series was not.

Michigan and Penn State are scheduled to meet in 2026 in Ann Arbor and 2027 in State College.

== Game results ==
Michigan victories	Penn State victories

No.	Date	Location	Winning team		Losing team	
1	October 16, 1993	State College, PA	#18 Michigan	21	#7 Penn State	13
2	October 15, 1994	Ann Arbor, MI	#3 Penn State	31	#5 Michigan	24
3	November 18, 1995	State College, PA	#19 Penn State	27	#12 Michigan	17
4	November 16, 1996	Ann Arbor, MI	#11 Penn State	29	#16 Michigan	17
5	November 8, 1997	State College, PA	#4 Michigan	34	#2 Penn State	8
6	November 7, 1998	Ann Arbor, MI	#22 Michigan	27	#9 Penn State	0
7	November 13, 1999	State College, PA	#16 Michigan	31	#6 Penn State	27
8	November 11, 2000	Ann Arbor, MI	#21 Michigan	33	Penn State	11
9	October 6, 2001	State College, PA	#15 Michigan	20	Penn State	0
10	October 12, 2002	Ann Arbor, MI	#13 Michigan	27	#15 Penn State	24
11	October 15, 2005	Ann Arbor, MI	Michigan	27	#8 Penn State	25
12	October 14, 2006	State College, PA	#4 Michigan	17	Penn State	10
13	September 22, 2007	Ann Arbor, MI	Michigan	14	#10 Penn State	9
14	October 18, 2008	State College, PA	#3 Penn State	46	Michigan	17
15	October 24, 2009	Ann Arbor, MI	#13 Penn State	35	Michigan	10

No.	Date	Location	Winning team		Losing team	
16	October 30, 2010	State College, PA	Penn State	41	Michigan	31
17	October 12, 2013	State College, PA	Penn State	43	#18 Michigan	40
18	October 11, 2014	Ann Arbor, MI	Michigan	18	Penn State	13
19	November 21, 2015	State College, PA	#14 Michigan	28	Penn State	16
20	September 24, 2016	Ann Arbor, MI	#4 Michigan	49	Penn State	10
21	October 21, 2017	State College, PA	#2 Penn State	42	#19 Michigan	13
22	November 3, 2018	Ann Arbor, MI	#5 Michigan	42	#14 Penn State	7
23	October 19, 2019	State College, PA	#7 Penn State	28	#16 Michigan	21
24	November 28, 2020	Ann Arbor, MI	Penn State	27	Michigan	17
25	November 13, 2021	State College, PA	#6 Michigan	21	Penn State	17
26	October 15, 2022	Ann Arbor, MI	#5 Michigan	41	#10 Penn State	17
27	November 11, 2023	State College, PA	#3 Michigan	24	#10 Penn State	15
28	October 17, 2026	Ann Arbor, MI	Michigan	21	Penn State	18
Series: Michigan leads 18–10

== See also ==
- List of NCAA college football rivalry games
