= Graham Zug =

American football player (born 1987)

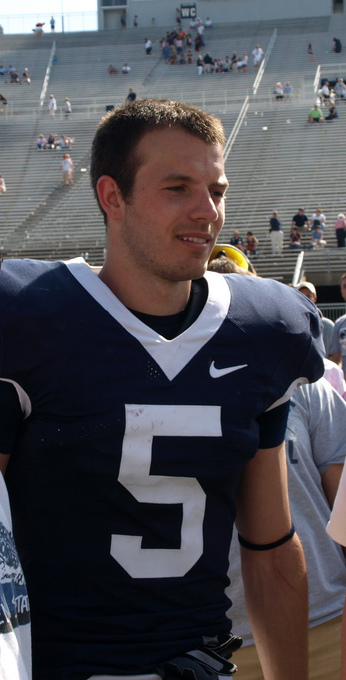

No. 5 – Penn State Nittany Lions
- Position: Wide receiver
- Class: (redshirt) Senior

Personal information
- Born: April 12, 1987 (age 39); Manheim, Pennsylvania, U.S.
- Listed height: 6 ft 2 in (1.88 m)
- Listed weight: 183 lb (83 kg)

Career information
- High school: Manheim Central; Manheim, Pennsylvania
- College: Penn State (2006–2010)

Graham Alan Zug (born April 12, 1987, in Manheim, Pennsylvania) is a former collegiate American football wide receiver who played for the Penn State Nittany Lions.

== Early life ==
Zug attended Manheim Central High School in Manheim, Pennsylvania, where he was named the 2005 Lancaster-Lebanon League Player-of-the-Year, edging out future Nittany Lion teammate, Jared Odrick.

== Collegiate career ==
During the 2007 season, Zug participated in two games, making one reception for eight yards against Florida International University.

In Penn State's 2008 season, despite being behind future NFL signees Derrick Williams, Jordan Norwood, and Deon Butler on Penn State's depth chart, Zug saw action in every game. He accumulated 11 receptions for 174 yards, including two touchdowns.

Zug played in every game of the 2009 season, starting nine. He led the Nittany Lions with seven touchdown catches and was second in receptions with 46. Zug had a career day in the October 24, 2009 win at Michigan, catching five passes for 59 yards and a career-high three touchdowns, making him the first Penn State player to catch three touchdowns in a game since Deon Butler in 2008.

== Personal ==
Zug has an older brother, David, who was a member of the Penn State Blue Band, and a younger sister, Daneen, who was a member of the Penn State women's field hockey team. His parents are David and Claudia Zug.

=== Internet phenomenon ===
Zug has become somewhat of an internet meme—especially on the Penn State sports-related blog, Black Shoe Diaries, where his fictional, absurdly heroic exploits are celebrated in the vein of "Chuck Norris facts."
