= 2009 Minnesota Golden Gophers football team =

American college football season

2009 Minnesota Golden Gophers football

Insight Bowl, L 13–14 vs. Iowa State
- Conference: Big Ten Conference
- Record: 6–7 (3–5 Big Ten)
- Head coach: Tim Brewster (3rd season)
- Offensive coordinator: Jedd Fisch (1st season)
- Offensive scheme: Pro-style
- Co-defensive coordinators: Kevin Cosgrove (1st season); Ronnie Lee (1st season)
- Base defense: 3–4
- Captains: Garrett Brown; Lee Campbell; Eric Decker; Eric Small; Adam Weber
- Home stadium: TCF Bank Stadium

2009 Big Ten Conference football standings
	Conf.			Overall
Team	W		L	W		L
No. 5 Ohio State $	7	–	1	11	–	2
No. 7 Iowa %	6	–	2	11	–	2
No. 9 Penn State	6	–	2	11	–	2
Northwestern	5	–	3	8	–	5
No. 16 Wisconsin	5	–	3	10	–	3
Michigan State	4	–	4	6	–	7
Purdue	4	–	4	5	–	7
Minnesota	3	–	5	6	–	7
Illinois	2	–	6	3	–	9
Michigan	1	–	7	5	–	7
Indiana	1	–	7	4	–	8
$ – BCS representative as conference champion; % – BCS at-large representative; Rankings from AP Poll

The 2009 Minnesota Golden Gophers football team represented the University of Minnesota as a member of the Big Ten Conference during the 2009 NCAA Division I FBS football season. Led by third-year head coach Tim Brewster, the Golden Gophers compiled an overall record of 6–7 with a mark of 3–5 in conference play, placing eighth in the Big Ten. Minnesota was invited to the Insight Bowl, where the Golden Gophers lost to Iowa State. The team played home games at the newly opened TCF Bank Stadium in Minneapolis.

On September 12, the Minnesota opened the TCF Bank Stadium with a 20–13 win against Air Force. The Hubert H. Humphrey Metrodome had been the team's home stadium since 1982.

== Schedule ==
Date	Time	Opponent	Site	TV	Result	Attendance	Source
September 5	11:00 am	at Syracuse*	Carrier Dome; Syracuse, NY	ESPN2	W 23–20 ^{OT}	48,617	
September 12	6:00 pm	Air Force*	TCF Bank Stadium; Minneapolis, MN	BTN	W 20–13	50,805	
September 19	11:00 am	No. 8 California*	TCF Bank Stadium; Minneapolis, MN	ESPN	L 21–35	50,805	
September 26	11:00 am	at Northwestern	Ryan Field; Evanston, IL	BTN	W 35–24	22,091	
October 3	11:00 am	Wisconsin	TCF Bank Stadium; Minneapolis, MN (rivalry)	ESPN	L 28–31	50,805	
October 10	11:00 am	Purdue^{†}	TCF Bank Stadium; Minneapolis, MN	ESPN2	W 35–20	50,805	
October 17	2:30 pm	at No. 14 Penn State	Beaver Stadium; University Park, PA (Governor's Victory Bell)	ABC/ESPN	L 0–20	107,981	
October 24	11:00 am	at No. 18 Ohio State	Ohio Stadium; Columbus, OH	ESPN	L 7–38	105,011	
October 31	7:00 pm	Michigan State	TCF Bank Stadium; Minneapolis, MN	BTN	W 42–34	50,805	
November 7	11:00 am	Illinois	TCF Bank Stadium; Minneapolis, MN	BTN	L 32–35	50,805	
November 14	11:00 am	No. 12 (FCS) South Dakota State*	TCF Bank Stadium; Minneapolis, MN	BTN	W 16–13	50,805	
November 21	11:00 am	at No. 15 Iowa	Kinnick Stadium; Iowa City, IA (rivalry)	ESPN	L 0–12	70,585	
December 31	5:00 pm	vs. Iowa State*	Sun Devil Stadium; Tempe, AZ (Insight Bowl)	NFLN	L 13–14	45,090	
*Non-conference game; ^{†}Homecoming; Rankings from AP Poll released prior to the game; All times are in Central time

== Preseason ==
The Golden Gophers came off a 7–6 season after starting 7–1, capped by an appearance in the 2008 Insight Bowl. On January 6, offensive coordinator Mike Dunbar resigned and defensive coordinator Ted Roof left Minnesota for Auburn. On January 9, former Nebraska defensive coordinator Kevin Cosgrove was hired as the co-defensive coordinator, a position he shared with Ronnie Lee. On January 21, Jedd Fisch was named the offensive coordinator. He had previously been the wide receivers coach for the Denver Broncos.

== Game summaries ==
=== Syracuse ===
	1	2	3	4	OT	Total
Golden Gophers	14	0	3	3	3	23
Orange	10	10	0	0	0	20

=== Air Force ===
	1	2	3	4	Total
Falcons	0	3	7	3	13
Golden Gophers	3	0	0	17	20

=== California ===
	1	2	3	4	Total
Golden Bears	14	7	0	14	35
Golden Gophers	0	14	7	0	21

=== Northwestern ===
	1	2	3	4	Total
Golden Gophers	7	7	7	14	35
Wildcats	3	7	14	0	24

=== Wisconsin ===
	1	2	3	4	Total
Badgers	7	3	7	14	31
Golden Gophers	10	3	0	15	28

=== Purdue ===
	1	2	3	4	Total
Boilermakers	10	3	0	7	20
Golden Gophers	0	14	21	0	35

=== Penn State ===
	1	2	3	4	Total
Golden Gophers	0	0	0	0	0
Nittany Lions	3	10	7	0	20

=== Ohio State ===
	1	2	3	4	Total
Golden Gophers	0	0	0	7	7
Buckeyes	0	7	21	10	38

=== Michigan State ===
	1	2	3	4	Total
Spartans	3	7	21	3	34
Golden Gophers	14	7	7	14	42

=== Illinois ===
	1	2	3	4	Total
Fighting Illini	14	14	0	7	35
Golden Gophers	0	7	3	22	32

=== South Dakota State ===
	1	2	3	4	Total
Jackrabbits	0	10	0	3	13
Golden Gophers	6	7	0	3	16

=== Iowa ===
	1	2	3	4	Total
Golden Gophers	0	0	0	0	0
Hawkeyes	3	6	3	0	12

=== Iowa State–Insight Bowl ===
	1	2	3	4	Total
Golden Gophers	3	0	10	0	13
Cyclones	0	14	0	0	14
