= Tim Brewster =

American football player and coach (born 1960)

Biographical details
- Born: October 13, 1960 (age 66); Phillipsburg, New Jersey, U.S.

Playing career
- 1981–1983: Illinois
- Position: Tight end

Coaching career (HC unless noted)
- 1986: Purdue (GA)
- 1987–1988: Lafayette Central Catholic HS (IN)
- 1989–1997: North Carolina (ST/TE)
- 1998–2001: Texas (TE)
- 2002–2003: San Diego Chargers (TE)
- 2004: San Diego Chargers (AHC/TE)
- 2005–2006: Denver Broncos (TE)
- 2007–2010: Minnesota
- 2012: Mississippi State (WR)
- 2013–2017: Florida State (TE)
- 2018: Texas A&M (TE)
- 2019: North Carolina (AHC/TE/RC)
- 2020–2021: Florida (AHC/TE)
- 2022: Jackson State (TE)
- 2023: Colorado (TE)
- 2024: Charlotte (AHC/TE)
- 2024: Charlotte (interim HC)

Head coaching record
- Overall: 17–30 (college); 15–8 (high school)
- Bowls: 0–2

Accomplishments and honors

Awards
- Second-team All-Big Ten (1983)

Timothy Jon Brewster (born October 13, 1960) is an American football coach and former player.

He was the head coach of the University of Minnesota from 2007 until he was fired midway through the Golden Gophers' 2010 season.

In 2011, Brewster was a sideline analyst for Fox College Football and the NFL on Fox with Gus Johnson and Charles Davis. Brewster is currently an Analyst with the North Carolina Sports Network and co-hosts Bold North State Football Daily.

== Playing career ==
Born and raised in Phillipsburg, New Jersey and coming out of Phillipsburg High School, Brewster was a hybrid somewhere between a wide receiver and a tight end. He enrolled at Pasadena City College, at the time a major junior college program, and was recruited along with five other players to transfer to the University of Illinois where they were looking to involve the tight end more heavily in their offensive scheme. At Illinois he was a two-time All-Big Ten Conference selection as a tight end. At the end of his first season he played against the University of Alabama in the 1982 Liberty Bowl, which was Bear Bryant's final game. In his final season he captained the Illini during their run to the 1984 Rose Bowl. He was a player at Illinois at the same time former Minnesota Vikings head coach Brad Childress was an assistant coach. He graduated with a degree in political science. The Illinois program named him one of the Fighting Illini's ten greatest receivers in 2008. Following his college career, he made an unsuccessful attempt at establishing a professional playing career in the National Football League (NFL). He was cut during training camp for both the 1984 New York Giants and the 1985 Philadelphia Eagles.

== Coaching career ==
=== High school ===
Brewster began his coaching career as a graduate assistant at Purdue University in 1986 under Leon Burtnett. Burtnett was fired in the middle of the season. Brewster then went to work as a car salesman, an experience he described as the "most miserable experience in my whole life." Soon afterwards he was hired as head coach at Central Catholic High School (CCHS) in Lafayette, Indiana. Legendary coach Bear Bryant, when they met in 1982, advised him, after hearing of his interest in coaching, to coach high school and "really learn the game." During his two years there (1987–1988), he directed a pass-heavy, wide-open offense that enabled its quarterback to lead the state of Indiana in passing both years. His record at CCHS was 15–8.

=== Early college ===
Brewster resumed his college career under then-University of North Carolina head coach Mack Brown (driving to Chapel Hill and convincing Brown to hire him as an unpaid volunteer assistant for the 1989 season). He gained a full-time job before the following season, and served as a special teams coach, tight ends coach, and recruiting coordinator under Brown.

When Brown was hired as head coach at the University of Texas following the 1997 season, Brewster followed him and worked as tight ends coach from 1998 to 2001. As a recruiter for Texas, he helped land a number of highly touted players, including Vince Young.

=== National Football League ===
After 13 years with Mack Brown, Brewster decided to try coaching in the NFL to "enhance [his] Xs and Os [. . .] and study the game at a level without distractions" that come with college players and NCAA requirements. Brewster gained his first NFL coaching experience when he was hired as the tight ends coach for the San Diego Chargers, a position he held from 2002 to 2004. He is credited with the rapid ascent of Antonio Gates, who went from an undrafted free agent in 2003 to a first-team All-Pro and Pro Bowl selection in 2004, only his second year in the NFL. Brewster was held in such high esteem by his peers that he served as assistant head coach during the 2004 season. He was hired by the Denver Broncos as their tight ends coach prior to the 2005 season, and served in that capacity for two seasons before moving on to the University of Minnesota.

=== Minnesota ===
On January 15, 2007, it was reported on ESPN.com that Brewster was the choice of University of Minnesota athletic director Joel Maturi to replace Glen Mason as the Gophers head coach. Various local news outlets, including WCCO and the Star Tribune, could not confirm the veracity of the report. The following day, January 16, Minnesota associate athletic director Tom Wistrcill confirmed that Brewster was indeed the university's choice, with the contract signed in the early morning. He was officially presented as the new head coach on Wednesday, January 17 at the McNamara Alumni Center on the University of Minnesota campus. At his first press conference, Brewster stated that his long-term goal for the program was to "win the Big Ten championship" and "take the Gopher Nation back to Pasadena."

Brewster signed a five-year contract worth : $400,000 in base salary, $400,000 in supplemental salary and $200,000 in deferred compensation that will vest after his contract expires. Additionally, annual bonuses of up to $700,000 were included based on the Gophers reaching certain goals: win the Big Ten title ($200,000; $75,000 for second place), the national championship game ($300,000 for reaching the game; an additional $50,000 for winning), any non-title BCS bowl game ($200,000; $100,000 for each bowl game played on New Year's Day or after that is not a BCS game; $25,000 for pre-New Year's Day bowl games), as well as reaching maximum goals in two academic categories, the Academic Progress Report (up to $50,000) and sixth-year graduation rates (up to $100,000 for 75%). He decided not to retain any of his predecessor's assistant coaches.

After a dismal start to the 2010 season which had featured four straight home losses, fans and media openly speculated that Tim Brewster would not coach at Minnesota past the 2010 season. Early in that season, University President Robert Bruininks publicly criticized the current state of football under Coach Brewster when he told the Minnesota Daily, "We need a stronger football program here at the University of Minnesota." On September 11, 2010, Minnesota lost a home game to the South Dakota Coyotes, a Division I FCS team, by a score of 41–38. The last time the Coyotes defeated the Golden Gophers in a football contest prior to that was on September 28, 1912.

Brewster was relieved of his head coaching position and had his contract terminated on October 17, 2010. As stipulated in his contract, Brewster received a $600,000 buyout. Joel Maturi commented that "While I appreciate the passion and commitment that Coach Brewster has shown, it is clear that a change in the leadership of Gopher football is necessary." Co-offensive coordinator Jeff Horton assumed the duties of head coach for the remainder of the 2010 season, leading the team to a 2–3 record and upset wins over Illinois and Iowa during his tenure as interim coach.

=== Assistant coaching ===
Following his firing at Minnesota, Brewster returned to assistant and positional coaching in the college ranks. On August 23, 2013, Brewster was hired by Mississippi State University for the position of wide receivers coach, replacing Angelo Mirando. He then coached at Florida State, Texas A&M, North Carolina, Florida and Jackson State. In 2023, he followed his Jackson State head coach Deion Sanders to Colorado, where he served as Tight Ends coach.

Charlotte hired Brewster as the associate head coach and tight ends coach for the 2024 season. Charlotte fired head coach Biff Poggi on November 18, 2024, and Brewster succeeded him as interim head coach. Charlotte hired Tim Albin as the permanent head coach on December 7, 2024.

== Head coaching record ==
=== College ===
Year	Team	Overall	Conference	Standing	Bowl/playoffs
Minnesota Golden Gophers (Big Ten Conference) (2007–2010)
2007	Minnesota	1–11	0–8	11th	
2008	Minnesota	7–6	3–5	T–6th	L Insight
2009	Minnesota	6–7	3–5	8th	L Insight
2010	Minnesota	1–6	0–3	(Note: Minnesota fired Brewster with five games remaining)	
Minnesota:		15–30	6–21		
Charlotte 49ers (American Athletic Conference) (2024)
2024	Charlotte	2–0 (Note: Brewster became interim head coach after Biff Poggi was fired)	2–0	T–6th	
Charlotte:		2–0	2–0		
Total:		17–30			
