= Chris Martin (defensive back) =

American football player (born 1974)

Profile
- Position: Defensive back

Personal information
- Born: September 1, 1974 (age 52); Tampa, Florida, U.S.

Career information
- College: Northwestern
- NFL draft: 1996

Career history
- 1996: Chicago Bears

Awards and highlights
- First-team All-Big Ten (1995)
- Stats at Pro Football Reference

Chris Martin (born September 1, 1974) is an American former professional football player who was a defensive back for one season with the Chicago Bears of the National Football League (NFL). Martin was a three-year starter and four-year letterman playing college football as a cornerback for the Northwestern Wildcats from 1992 to 1995. He was a member of the Big Ten championship season and Rose Bowl team in 1995.
