= 2009 Illinois Fighting Illini football team =

American college football season

2009 Illinois Fighting Illini football
- Conference: Big Ten Conference
- Record: 3–9 (2–6 Big Ten)
- Head coach: Ron Zook (5th season)
- Offensive coordinator: Mike Schultz (1st season)
- Offensive scheme: Spread option
- Co-defensive coordinators: Dan Disch (3rd season); Curt Mallory (3rd season)
- Base defense: 4–3
- Captains: Jon Asamoah; Arrelious Benn; Doug Pilcher; Ian Thomas
- Home stadium: Memorial Stadium

2009 Big Ten Conference football standings
	Conf.			Overall
Team	W		L	W		L
No. 5 Ohio State $	7	–	1	11	–	2
No. 7 Iowa %	6	–	2	11	–	2
No. 9 Penn State	6	–	2	11	–	2
Northwestern	5	–	3	8	–	5
No. 16 Wisconsin	5	–	3	10	–	3
Michigan State	4	–	4	6	–	7
Purdue	4	–	4	5	–	7
Minnesota	3	–	5	6	–	7
Illinois	2	–	6	3	–	9
Michigan	1	–	7	5	–	7
Indiana	1	–	7	4	–	8
$ – BCS representative as conference champion; % – BCS at-large representative; Rankings from AP Poll

The 2009 Illinois Fighting Illini football team was an American football team that represented the University of Illinois Urbana-Champaign as a member of the Big Ten Conference during the 2009 NCAA Division I FBS football season. In their fifth season under head coach Ron Zook, the Fighting Illini compiled a 3–9 record (2–6 in conference games), finished in ninth place in the Big Ten, and were outscored by a total of 362 to 290.

The team's statistical leaders included quarterback Juice Williams (1,632 passing yards), running back Mikel Leshoure (734 rushing yards, 42 points scored), and wide receiver Arrelious Benn (38 receptions for 490 yards).

The team played its home games at Memorial Stadium in Champaign, Illinois.

== Schedule ==
Date	Time	Opponent	Site	TV	Result	Attendance
September 5	2:30 pm	vs. Missouri*	Edward Jones Dome; St. Louis, MO (Arch Rivalry)	ESPN	L 9–37	64,215
September 12	6:00 pm	Illinois State*	Memorial Stadium; Champaign, IL	BTN	W 45–17	62,347
September 26	2:30 pm	at No. 13 Ohio State	Ohio Stadium; Columbus, OH (Illibuck Trophy)	ABC/ESPN	L 0–30	105,219
October 3	2:30 pm	No. 13 Penn State	Memorial Stadium; Champaign, IL	ABC/ESPN2	L 17–35	62,870
October 10	11:00 am	Michigan State^{†}	Memorial Stadium; Champaign, IL	BTN	L 14–24	62,870
October 17	6:00 pm	at Indiana	Memorial Stadium; Bloomington, IN (rivalry)	BTN	L 14–27	42,358
October 24	11:00 am	at Purdue	Ross–Ade Stadium; West Lafayette, IN (Purdue Cannon)	ESPN2	L 14–24	47,349
October 31	2:30 pm	Michigan	Memorial Stadium; Champaign, IL (rivalry)	ABC/ESPN2	W 38–13	60,119
November 7	11:00 am	at Minnesota	TCF Bank Stadium; Minneapolis, MN	BTN	W 35–32	50,805
November 14	11:00 am	Northwestern	Memorial Stadium; Champaign, IL (Land of Lincoln Trophy)	ESPNC	L 16–21	60,523
November 27	11:00 am	at No. 5 Cincinnati*	Nippert Stadium; Cincinnati, OH	ABC	L 36–49	35,106
December 5	11:30 am	Fresno State*	Memorial Stadium; Champaign, IL	BTN	L 52–53	48,538
*Non-conference game; ^{†}Homecoming; Rankings from AP Poll released prior to the game; All times are in Central time
