= Rebecca Haarlow =

American sideline reporter (born 1978)

- Born: December 20, 1978 (age 47); Chicago, Illinois, U.S.
- Education: Princeton University
- Occupation: Reporter
- Website: rebeccahaarlow.com

Rebecca Haarlow (born December 20, 1978) is an American sideline reporter for MSG Network, NBA TV, the NBA on TNT, and the Big Ten Network. Previously she served as a sideline reporter for Fox Sports Net, and as an anchor and reporter for the NFL Network.

== Early years ==
Haarlow is a native of western suburb of Chicago, Illinois. She attended Hinsdale Central High School where she won six Class AA state track and field medals. Haarlow finished eighth in the 800-meter medley relay, eighth in the 400 relay and also finished sixth in the triple jump in 1996. In 1997, she finished second in the 100 high hurdles, fifth in the 300 low hurdles and sixth in the triple jump while in high school. She also graduated from Princeton University. She scored 4,700 in the 1999 Ivy League Heptagonal Outdoor Championships in which is the second-highest mark in Princeton history, finishing in third place with that score.

== Career ==
In 2003, Haarlow was the Public Relations Coordinator for Silicon Valley Sports and Entertainment, until she became the sideline Reporter for the Portland Trail Blazers in 2007. In 2011, she joined NFL Network at the beginning of the 2011 NFL season as a news anchor. Prior to working at NFL Network, she was a sideline reporter for the FOX Sports Network. On January 8, 2013, she joined NBC 5 in Chicago on a part-time basis. on September 6, 2015, she joined MSG Network as a reporter for New York Knicks telecasts, replacing Tina Cervasio.
