= 2010 Capital One Bowl =

American college football game

Penn State Nittany Lions	LSU Tigers
(10–2)	(9–3)
Big Ten	SEC
19	17
Head coach: Joe Paterno	Head coach: Les Miles
AP / Coaches / BCS; 11 / 9 / 13	AP / Coaches / BCS; 13 / 13 / 12
	1	2	3	4	Total
Penn State	7	6	3	3	19
LSU	0	3	7	7	17
- Date: January 1, 2010
- Season: 2009
- Stadium: Florida Citrus Bowl
- Location: Orlando, Florida
- MVP: Daryll Clark (Penn State QB)
- Referee: Brian O'Cain (Pac-10)
- Attendance: 63,025
- Payout: US$4,250,000

United States TV coverage
- Network: ABC
- Announcers: Brad Nessler (play-by-play); Todd Blackledge (analyst); Erin Andrews (sideline)
- Nielsen ratings: 6.8

The 2010 Capital One Bowl was the sixty-fourth edition of the college football bowl game, and was played at the Citrus Bowl in Orlando, Florida. The game was played on January 1 and matched the LSU Tigers against the Penn State Nittany Lions. Penn State won the game 19–17 after a 21-yard field goal by Penn State kicker Collin Wagner with 57 seconds left in the game.

Although the game marked LSU's third appearance in the Capital One Bowl and Penn State's fifth, it was the first time the two teams faced each other in the bowl's history, and only the second time the two teams met overall (the first being the 1974 Orange Bowl). The two teams represented the highest ranked SEC team and Big Ten team not appearing in a Bowl Championship Series (BCS) bowl game.

The game was notable for its poor field conditions. Eight state high school championship games had been played at the stadium in recent weeks, but the turf was replaced immediately after the last games on December 19. The Champs Sports Bowl, played ten days later, badly damaged the new turf. The grounds crew worked frantically over the next three days in an attempt to get the field in shape for the Capital One Bowl, but ultimately failed. As a result, this was the last Capital One Bowl to be played on grass as artificial turf was installed at the Citrus Bowl several months later.

== Game summary ==
Penn State coach Joe Paterno got his record 24th bowl win and handed Les Miles his first loss in five bowls as LSU coach. A driving rainstorm turned the field into a mud bowl. Bad footing and dropped passes were normal in the first half, and PSU fumbled the snap exchange twice though both were recovered by the offense. Quarterback Daryll Clark finished the game with 216 yards passing and one touchdown pass. LSU signal caller Jordan Jefferson threw for 202 yards 1 TD and 1 Interception, however the Tigers were held to just 41 total yards rushing. Collin Wagner's 21-yard field goal with 57 seconds left sealed the victory for the Nittany Lions. It was Joe Paterno's 24th career bowl victory, extending his own NCAA record. It had been the fourth win for Penn State in their last five bowl games.

== Scoring summary ==
Scoring Play	Score
1st Quarter
PSU — Derek Moye 37-yard pass from Daryll Clark (Collin Wagner kick), 1:54	PSU 7–0
2nd Quarter
LSU — Josh Jasper 25-yard field goal, 14:15	PSU 7–3
PSU — Collin Wagner 26-yard field goal, 5:29	PSU 10–3
PSU — Collin Wagner 18-yard field goal, 0:04	PSU 13–3
3rd Quarter
PSU — Collin Wagner 20-yard field goal, 2:27	PSU 16–3
LSU — Brandon LaFell 24-yard pass from Jordan Jefferson (Josh Jasper kick), 0:13	PSU 16–10
4th Quarter
LSU — Stevan Ridley 1-yard run (Josh Jasper kick), 12:49	LSU 17–16
PSU — Collin Wagner 21-yard field goal, 0:57	PSU 19–17
