= Michigan State Spartans football statistical leaders =

The Michigan State Spartans football statistical leaders are individual statistical leaders of the Michigan State Spartans football program in various categories, including passing, rushing, total offense, receiving, defensive stats, kicking, and scoring. Within those areas, the lists identify single-game, Single season and career leaders. The Spartans represent Michigan State University in the NCAA's Big Ten Conference.

Although Michigan State began competing in intercollegiate football in 1896, the school's official record book considers the "modern era" to have begun in 1945. Records from before this year are often incomplete and inconsistent, and they are generally not included in these lists.

These lists are dominated by more recent players for several reasons:

- Since 1945, seasons have increased from 10 games to 11 and then 12 games in length.
- The NCAA didn't allow freshmen to play varsity football until 1972 (with the exception of the World War II years), allowing players to have four-year careers.
- Bowl games only began counting toward single-season and career statistics in 2002. The Spartans have played in 10 bowl games since then.
- Similarly, the Spartans have played in the Big Ten Championship Game three times since it began in 2011, so players in those seasons had 14 games to accumulate statistics.
- Due to COVID-19 disruptions, the NCAA ruled that the 2020 season would not be counted against any football player's athletic eligibility, giving players active in that season five years of eligibility instead of the standard four.

These lists are updated through the 2025 season.

== Passing ==
=== Passing yards ===
Career
Rank	Player	Yards	Years
1	Connor Cook	9,194	2012 2013 2014 2015
2	Kirk Cousins	9,131	2008 2009 2010 2011
3	Jeff Smoker	8,932	2000 2001 2002 2003
4	Brian Lewerke	8,293	2016 2017 2018 2019
5	Drew Stanton	6,524	2003 2004 2005 2006
6	Payton Thorne	6,501	2020 2021 2022
7	Brian Hoyer	6,159	2005 2006 2007 2008
8	Dave Yarema	5,809	1982 1983 1984 1985 1986
9	Ed Smith	5,706	1976 1977 1978
10	Bill Burke	5,463	1996 1997 1998 1999

Single-season
Rank	Player	Yards	Year
1	Jeff Smoker	3,395	2003
2	Kirk Cousins	3,316	2011
3	Payton Thorne	3,240	2021
4	Connor Cook	3,214	2014
5	Connor Cook	3,131	2015
6	Brian Lewerke	3,079	2019
7	Drew Stanton	3,077	2005
8	Kirk Cousins	2,825	2010
9	Brian Lewerke	2,793	2017
10	Connor Cook	2,755	2013

Single game
Rank	Player	Yards	Year	Opponent
1	Brian Lewerke	445	2017	Northwestern
2	Bill Burke	400	1999	Michigan
	Brian Lewerke	400	2017	Penn State
4	Connor Cook	398	2015	Indiana
5	Jeff Smoker	376	2001	Fresno State
6	Ed Smith	369	1978	Indiana
7	Connor Cook	367	2015	Rutgers
8	Aidan Chiles	363	2024	Maryland
9	Jim Miller	360	1993	Ohio State
10	Connor Cook	358	2014	Ohio State

=== Passing touchdowns ===
Career
Rank	Player	TDs	Years
1	Connor Cook	71	2012 2013 2014 2015
2	Kirk Cousins	66	2008 2009 2010 2011
3	Jeff Smoker	61	2000 2001 2002 2003
4	Payton Thorne	49	2020 2021 2022
5	Brian Lewerke	47	2016 2017 2018 2019
6	Bill Burke	46	1996 1997 1998 1999
7	Dave Yarema	44	1982 1983 1984 1985 1986
8	Ed Smith	43	1976 1977 1978
9	Drew Stanton	42	2003 2004 2005 2006
10	Brian Hoyer	35	2005 2006 2007 2008

Single-season
Rank	Player	TDs	Year
1	Payton Thorne	27	2021
2	Kirk Cousins	25	2011
3	Connor Cook	24	2014
	Connor Cook	24	2015
5	Drew Stanton	22	2005
	Connor Cook	22	2013
7	Jeff Smoker	21	2001
	Jeff Smoker	21	2003
9	Ed Smith	20	1978
	Bill Burke	20	1999
	Brian Hoyer	20	2007
	Kirk Cousins	20	2010
	Brian Lewerke	20	2017

Single game
Rank	Player	TDs	Year	Opponent
1	Drew Stanton	5	2005	Illinois
2	Brian Lewerke	4	2017	Northwestern
	Mike Rasmussen	4	1970	Indiana
	Ed Smith	4	1978	Wisconsin
	Bill Burke	4	1998	Central Michigan
	Bill Burke	4	1999	Iowa
	Damon Dowdell	4	2002	Indiana
	Jeff Smoker	4	2003	Penn State
	Brian Hoyer	4	2007	Notre Dame
	Brian Hoyer	4	2007	Penn State
	Connor Cook	4	2013	Youngstown State
	Connor Cook	4	2015	Air Force
	Connor Cook	4	2015	Indiana
	Connor Cook	4	2015	Nebraska
	Payton Thorne	4	2021	Youngstown State
	Payton Thorne	4	2021	Miami (FL)
	Payton Thorne	4	2021	Maryland
	Payton Thorne	4	2022	Western Michigan
	Aidan Chiles	4	2025	Boston College
	Alessio Milivojevic	4	2025	Maryland

== Rushing ==
=== Rushing yards ===
Career
Rank	Player	Yards	Years
1	Lorenzo White	4,887	1984 1985 1986 1987
2	Javon Ringer	4,398	2005 2006 2007 2008
3	Tico Duckett	4,212	1989 1990 1991 1992
4	Blake Ezor	3,749	1986 1987 1988 1989
5	Sedrick Irvin	3,504	1996 1997 1998
6	T. J. Duckett	3,379	1999 2000 2001
7	Le'Veon Bell	3,346	2010 2011 2012
8	Jeremy Langford	2,967	2012 2013 2014
9	Duane Goulbourne	2,848	1992 1993 1994 1996
10	LJ Scott	2,771	2015 2016 2017 2018

Single-season
Rank	Player	Yards	Year
1	Lorenzo White	2,066	1985
2	Le'Veon Bell	1,793	2012
3	Javon Ringer	1,673	2008
4	Kenneth Walker III	1,636	2021
5	Lorenzo White	1,572	1987
6	Jeremy Langford	1,522	2014
7	Blake Ezor	1,496	1988
8	Eric Allen	1,494	1971
9	Javon Ringer	1,447	2007
10	Jeremy Langford	1,422	2013

Single game
Rank	Player	Yards	Year	Opponent
1	Eric Allen	350	1971	Purdue
2	Lorenzo White	292	1987	Indiana
3	Lorenzo White	286	1985	Indiana
4	Javon Ringer	282	2008	Florida Atlantic
5	Clinton Jones	268	1966	Iowa
6	Le'Veon Bell	266	2012	Minnesota
7	Kenneth Walker III	264	2021	Northwestern
8	Le'Veon Bell	253	2012	Eastern Michigan
9	Blake Ezor	250	1988	Indiana
10	T. J. Duckett	248	2000	Iowa

=== Rushing touchdowns ===
Career
Rank	Player	TDs	Years
1	Lorenzo White	43	1984 1985 1986 1987
2	Jeremy Langford	40	2012 2013 2014
3	Jehuu Caulcrick	39	2004 2005 2006 2007
4	Sedrick Irvin	35	1996 1997 1998
5	Javon Ringer	34	2005 2006 2007 2008
	Blake Ezor	34	1986 1987 1988 1989
7	Le'Veon Bell	33	2010 2011 2012
8	T. J. Duckett	29	1999 2000 2001
9	Eric Allen	28	1969 1970 1971
	Lynn Chandnois	28	1946 1947 1948 1949

Single-season
Rank	Player	TDs	Year
1	Javon Ringer	22	2008
	Jeremy Langford	22	2014
3	Jehuu Caulcrick	21	2007
4	Blake Ezor	19	1989
5	Jeremy Langford	18	2013
	Eric Allen	18	1971
	Kenneth Walker III	18	2021
8	Scott Greene	17	1995
	Lorenzo White	17	1985
10	Sedrick Irvin	16	1996
	Lorenzo White	16	1987

Single game
Rank	Player	TDs	Year	Opponent
1	Blake Ezor	6	1989	Northwestern
2	Javon Ringer	5	2008	Eastern Michigan
	Kenneth Walker III	5	2021	Michigan

== Receiving ==
=== Receptions ===
Career
Rank	Player	Rec	Years
1	B.J. Cunningham	218	2008 2009 2010 2011
2	Aaron Burbridge	165	2012 2013 2014 2015
3	Darrell Stewart Jr.	150	2016 2017 2018 2019
4	Tony Lippett	149	2011 2012 2013 2014
5	Matt Trannon	148	2003 2004 2005 2006
6	Jayden Reed	147	2020 2021 2022
7	Andre Rison	146	1985 1986 1987 1988
8	Cody White	143	2017 2018 2019
9	Courtney Hawkins	138	1988 1989 1990 1991
10	Charles Rogers	135	2001 2002

Single-season
Rank	Player	Rec	Year
1	Aaron Burbridge	85	2015
2	B.J. Cunningham	79	2011
	Devin Thomas	79	2007
4	Blair White	70	2009
5	Charles Rogers	68	2002
6	Charles Rogers	67	2001
7	Keshawn Martin	66	2011
	Plaxico Burress	66	1999
	Cody White	66	2019
10	Plaxico Burress	65	1998
	Tony Lippett	65	2014

Single game
Rank	Player	Rec	Year	Opponent
1	Matt Trannon	14	2006	Eastern Michigan
2	Devin Thomas	13	2007	Indiana
	Plaxico Burress	13	2000	Florida
4	Felton Davis III	12	2017	Penn State
	B.J. Cunningham	12	2011	Notre Dame
	Blair White	12	2009	Northwestern
	Mitch Lyons	12	1992	Michigan
8	Kerry Reed	11	2006	Minnesota
	Josh Keur	11	1997	Northwestern
	Andre Rison	11	1986	Indiana
	Tony Lippett	11	2014	Oregon
	Jayden Reed	11	2020	Rutgers

=== Receiving yards ===
Career
Rank	Player	Yards	Years
1	B.J. Cunningham	3,086	2008 2009 2010 2011
2	Andre Rison	2,992	1985 1986 1987 1988
3	Charles Rogers	2,821	2001 2002
4	Kirk Gibson	2,347	1975 1976 1977 1978
5	Tony Lippett	2,247	2011 2012 2013 2014
6	Courtney Hawkins	2,210	1988 1989 1990 1991
7	Aaron Burbridge	2,174	2012 2013 2014 2015
8	Plaxico Burress	2,155	1998 1999
9	Mark Dell	2,136	2007 2008 2009 2010
10	Gari Scott	2,095	1996 1997 1998 1999

Single-season
Rank	Player	Yards	Year
1	Charles Rogers	1,470	2001
2	Charles Rogers	1,351	2002
3	B.J. Cunningham	1,306	2011
4	Devin Thomas	1,260	2007
5	Aaron Burbridge	1,258	2015
6	Tony Lippett	1,198	2014
7	Plaxico Burress	1,142	1999
8	Courtney Hawkins	1,080	1989
9	Jayden Reed	1,026	2021
10	Plaxico Burress	1,013	1998

Single game
Rank	Player	Yards	Year	Opponent
1	Charles Rogers	270	2001	Fresno State
2	Plaxico Burress	255	1999	Michigan
3	Andre Rison	252	1989	Georgia
4	Jalen Nailor	221	2021	Rutgers
5	Charles Rogers	206	2001	Wisconsin
6	Mark Dell	202	2008	California
7	Courtney Hawkins	197	1989	Minnesota
8	Andre Rison	196	1986	Indiana
	Ricky White	196	2020	Michigan
10	Nick Marsh	194	2024	Maryland

=== Receiving touchdowns ===
Career
Rank	Player	TDs	Years
1	Charles Rogers	27	2001 2002
2	B.J. Cunningham	25	2008 2009 2010 2011
3	Kirk Gibson	24	1975 1976 1977 1978
4	Josiah Price	21	2013 2014 2015 2016
5	Plaxico Burress	20	1998 1999
	Andre Rison	20	1985 1986 1987 1988
7	Gari Scott	18	1996 1997 1998 1999
	Jayden Reed	18	2020 2021 2022
9	Gene Washington	16	1964 1965 1966
10	Eugene Boyd	15	1975 1976 1978 1979
	Tony Lippett	15	2011 2012 2013 2014

Single-season
Rank	Player	TDs	Year
1	Charles Rogers	14	2001
2	Charles Rogers	13	2002
3	B.J. Cunningham	12	2011
	Plaxico Burress	12	1999
5	Tony Lippett	11	2014
6	Jayden Reed	10	2021
7	B.J. Cunningham	9	2010
	Blair White	9	2009
	Felton Davis III	9	2017
10	Devin Thomas	8	2007
	Plaxico Burress	8	1998
	Andre Rison	8	1988
	Bob Carey	8	1949

== Total offense ==
Total offense is the sum of passing and rushing statistics. It does not include receiving or returns.

=== Total offense yards ===
Career
Rank	Player	Yards	Years
1	Connor Cook	9,403	2012 2013 2014 2015
2	Kirk Cousins	9,004	2008 2009 2010 2011
3	Jeff Smoker	8,714	2000 2001 2002 2003
4	Drew Stanton	8,036	2003 2004 2005 2006
5	Payton Thorne	6,771	2020 2021 2022
6	Brian Hoyer	5,930	2005 2006 2007 2008
7	Ed Smith	5,556	1976 1977 1978
8	Brian Lewerke	5,284	2016 2017 2018
9	Dave Yarema	5,269	1982 1983 1984 1985 1986
10	Bill Burke	4,934	1996 1997 1998 1999

Single season
Rank	Player	Yards	Year
1	Payton Thorne	3,421	2021
2	Drew Stanton	3,415	2005
3	Brian Lewerke	3,352	2017
4	Connor Cook	3,294	2014
5	Jeff Smoker	3,279	2003
6	Kirk Cousins	3,277	2011
7	Connor Cook	3,187	2015
8	Connor Cook	2,831	2013
9	Kirk Cousins	2,740	2009
10	Payton Thorne	2,721	2022

Single game
Rank	Player	Yards	Year	Opponent
1	Brian Lewerke	475	2017	Northwestern
2	Brian Lewerke	425	2017	Penn State
3	Connor Cook	416	2015	Indiana
4	Drew Stanton	410	2004	Minnesota
5	Drew Stanton	406	2004	Hawaii
6	Jeff Smoker	393	2001	Fresno State
7	Bill Burke	383	1999	Michigan
8	Drew Stanton	375	2005	Notre Dame
9	Aidan Chiles	374	2024	Maryland
10	Connor Cook	373	2014	Ohio State

=== Touchdowns responsible for ===
"Touchdowns responsible for" is the official NCAA term for combined passing and rushing touchdowns.

Michigan State's record book does not list single-game leaders in this category.

Career
Rank	Player	TDs	Years
1	Connor Cook	74	2012 2013 2014 2015
2	Jeff Smoker	68	2000 2001 2002 2003
3	Kirk Cousins	67	2008 2009 2010 2011
4	Drew Stanton	57	2003 2004 2005 2006
5	Payton Thorne	55	2020 2021 2022
6	Bill Burke	47	1996 1997 1998 1999
7	Dave Yarema	46	1982 1983 1984 1985 1986
8	Ed Smith	45	1976 1977 1978
9	Lorenzo White	43	1984 1985 1986 1987
10	Jeremy Langford	40	2012 2013 2014

Single season
Rank	Player	TDs	Year
1	Payton Thorne	31	2021
2	Drew Stanton	26	2005
	Connor Cook	26	2014
4	Kirk Cousins	25	2011
	Brian Lewerke	25	2017
6	Jeff Smoker	24	2003
	Connor Cook	24	2015
8	Jeff Smoker	23	2001
	Connor Cook	23	2013
10	Javon Ringer	22	2008

== Defense ==
=== Interceptions ===
Career
Rank	Player	Ints	Years
1	Lynn Chandnois	20	1946 1947 1948 1949
2	Todd Krumm	18	1984 1985 1986 1987
3	Phil Parker	16	1982 1983 1984 1985
4	Kurt Larson	14	1985 1986 1987 1988
	John Miller	14	1985 1986 1987 1988
	Brad Van Pelt	14	1970 1971 1972
7	Mark Anderson	12	1976 1977 1978 1979
	Bill Simpson	12	1971 1972 1973
	Jesse Thomas	12	1948 1949 1950
10	Johnny Adams	11	2008 2010 2011 2012

Single-season
Rank	Player	Ints	Year
1	Todd Krumm	9	1987
2	Kurt Larson	8	1988
	John Miller	8	1987
	Jesse Thomas	8	1950
5	Demetrice Martin	7	1994
	Phil Parker	7	1983
	Lynn Chandnois	7	1949

Single game
Rank	Player	Ints	Year	Opponent
1	John Miller	4	1987	Michigan

=== Tackles ===
Career
Rank	Player	Tackles	Years
1	Dan Bass	541	1976 1977 1978 1979
2	Percy Snow	473	1986 1987 1988 1989
3	Greg Jones	465	2007 2008 2009 2010
4	Ike Reese	420	1994 1995 1996 1997
5	Josh Thornhill	395	1998 1999 2000 2001
6	Chuck Bullough	391	1988 1989 1990 1991
7	Ronald Stanley	368	2001 2002 2003 2004
8	Sorie Kanu	365	1995 1996 1997 1998
9	Aric Morris	350	1996 1997 1998 1999
10	Thomas Wright	346	1999 2000 2001 2002

Single-season
Rank	Player	Tackles	Year
1	Chuck Bullough	175	1991
2	Percy Snow	172	1989
3	Chuck Bullough	164	1990
	Percy Snow	164	1988
5	Dan Bass	160	1979
6	Shane Bullough	156	1985
7	Greg Jones	154	2009
8	Ty Hallock	144	1992
9	Ike Reese	137	1997
	Jim Morrissey	137	1984

Single game
Rank	Player	Tackles	Year	Opponent
1	Dan Bass	32	1979	Ohio State
2	Don Law	28	1969	Ohio State
3	Dan Bass	24	1979	Notre Dame
4	Percy Snow	23	1989	Illinois
5	Ty Hallock	21	1992	Minnesota
	Shane Bullough	21	1985	Indiana
	Brad Van Pelt	21	1971	Notre Dame
	Doug Barr	21	1969	Ohio State
	Don Law	21	1967	Indiana

=== Sacks ===
Career
Rank	Player	Sacks	Years
1	Larry Bethea	33.0	1975 1976 1977
2	Shilique Calhoun	26.0	2012 2013 2014 2015
	Kenny Willekes	26.0	2017 2018 2019
4	Julian Peterson	25.0	1998 1999
5	Travis Davis	24.0	1986 1987 1988 1989
	Kelly Quinn	24.0	1982 1983 1984 1985
7	Robaire Smith	22.0	1997 1998 1999
8	Denicos Allen	19.5	2010 2011 2012 2013
9	Greg Jones	16.5	2007 2008 2009 2010
10	Jacub Panasiuk	16.0	2017 2018 2019 2020 2021

Single-season
Rank	Player	Sacks	Year
1	Larry Bethea	16.0	1977
2	Julian Peterson	15.0	1999
3	Robaire Smith	12.0	1997
	Travis Davis	12.0	1987
	Kelly Quinn	12.0	1984
6	Denicos Allen	11.0	2011
7	Shilique Calhoun	10.5	2015
	Kenny Willekes	10.5	2019
9	Jonal Saint-Dic	10.0	2007
	Greg Taplin	10.0	2003
	Julian Peterson	10.0	1998
	Kelly Quinn	10.0	1983

== Kicking ==
=== Field goals made ===
Career
Rank	Player	FGs	Years
1	Matt Coghlin	76	2017 2018 2019 2020 2021
2	Brett Swenson	71	2006 2007 2008 2009
3	Dave Rayner	62	2001 2002 2003 2004
4	John Langeloh	57	1987 1988 1989 1990
5	Michael Geiger	56	2013 2014 2015 2016
6	Dan Conroy	55	2009 2010 2011 2012
7	Chris Gardner	52	1994 1995 1996 1997
8	Paul Edinger	46	1996 1997 1998 1999
9	Morten Andersen	45	1978 1979 1980 1981
10	Hans Nielsen	44	1974 1975 1976 1977

Single season
Rank	Player	FGs	Year
1	Dan Conroy	23	2012
2	Paul Edinger	22	1998
	Dave Rayner	22	2003
	Dave Rayner	22	2004
	Brett Swenson	22	2008
	Matt Coghlin	22	2019
7	Paul Edinger	21	1999
8	Brett Swenson	19	2009
	Jonathan Kim	19	2024
10	John Langeloh	18	1988
	Matt Coghlin	18	2018

Single game
Rank	Player	FGs	Year	Opponent
1	Jonathan Kim	6	2024	Iowa
2	John Langeloh	5	1988	Wisconsin
	Paul Edinger	5	1998	Northwestern
	Paul Edinger	5	1998	Ohio State
	Liam Boyd	5	2026	Toledo
	Liam Boyd	5	2026	Michigan

=== Field goal percentage ===
Career
Rank	Player	FG%	Years
1	Jonathan Kim	82.1%	2023 2024
2	Paul Edinger	79.3%	1996 1997 1998 1999
3	Brett Swenson	78.0%	2006 2007 2008 2009
4	Dan Conroy	77.5%	2009 2010 2011 2012
5	Martin Connington	75.0%	2025
6	Michael Geiger	73.7%	2013 2014 2015 2016
7	Matt Coghlin	73.1%	2017 2018 2019 2020 2021

Single season
Rank	Player	FG%	Year
1	Michael Geiger	93.8%	2013
2	Jonathan Kim	90.5%	2024
3	Brett Swenson	86.4%	2009
4	Paul Edinger	84.6%	1998
5	Matt Coghlin	81.8%	2018
6	Paul Edinger	80.8%	1999
7	Michael Geiger	78.9%	2016
	Matt Coghlin	78.9%	2017
9	Brett Swenson	78.6%	2008

== Scoring ==
Michigan State's most recent record book (2021) does not break down leaders over any time frame (career, single-season, game) by type of score. Some leaders' breakdowns can be extrapolated from information included in the record book, or from other sources.

=== Total points ===
Career
Rank	Player	Points	Years
1	Matt Coghlin	382	2017 2018 2019 2020 2021
2	Brett Swenson	377	2006 2007 2008 2009
3	Michael Geiger	357	2013 2014 2015 2016
4	Dave Rayner	334	2001 2002 2003 2004
5	John Langeloh	308	1987 1988 1989 1990
6	Dan Conroy	283	2009 2010 2011 2012
7	Chris Gardner	281	1994 1995 1996 1997
8	Morten Andersen	261	1978 1979 1980 1981
9	Lorenzo White	258	1984 1985 1986 1987
10	Sedrick Irvin	252	1996 1997 1998
	Jeremy Langford	252	2011 2012 2013 2014

Single season
Rank	Player	Points	Year
1	Javon Ringer	132	2008
	Jeremy Langford	132	2014
3	Jehuu Caulcrick	126	2007
4	Michael Geiger	114	2014
5	Jeremy Langford	114	2013
	Blake Ezor	114	1989
	Kenneth Walker III	114	2021
8	Scott Greene	112	1995
9	Eric Allen	110	1971
10	Sedrick Irvin	108	1996

Single game
Rank	Player	Points	Year	Opponent
1	Blake Ezor	36	1989	Northwestern
2	Javon Ringer	30	2008	Eastern Michigan
	Kenneth Walker III	30	2021	Michigan
4	Scott Greene	26	1995	Illinois
5	18 times	24	Most recent: Jaziun Patterson, 2026 vs. Illinois	

=== Total touchdowns ===
These lists include touchdowns scored by each individual player, thus including rushing, receiving, and return touchdowns but not passing touchdowns. Michigan State does not break down its lists of total touchdown leaders by type of play.

Career
Rank	Player	TDs	Years
1	Lorenzo White	43	1984 1985 1986 1987
2	Sedrick Irvin	42	1996 1997 1998
	Jeremy Langford	42	2011 2012 2013 2014
4	Jehuu Caulcrick	40	2004 2005 2006 2007
5	Javon Ringer	35	2005 2006 2007 2008
6	Blake Ezor	34	1986 1987 1988 1989
	Le'Veon Bell	34	2010 2011 2012
8	Lynn Chandnois	31	1946 1947 1948 1949
9	Eric Allen	30	1969 1970 1971
	T. J. Duckett	30	1999 2000 2001

Single season
Rank	Player	TDs	Year
1	Javon Ringer	22	2008
	Jeremy Langford	22	2014
3	Jehuu Caulcrick	21	2007
4	Blake Ezor	19	1989
	Jeremy Langford	19	2013
	Kenneth Walker III	19	2021
7	Eric Allen	18	1971
	Scott Greene	18	1995
	Sedrick Irvin	18	1996
10	Lorenzo White	17	1985
	Lorenzo White	16	1987
	Charles Rogers	16	2001

Single game
Rank	Player	TDs	Year	Opponent
1	Blake Ezor	6	1989	Northwestern
2	Javon Ringer	5	2008	Eastern Michigan
	Kenneth Walker III	5	2021	Michigan
4	20 times	4	Most recent: Jaziun Patterson, 2026 vs. Illinois	
