= Brett Swenson =

American football player (born 1988)

No. 2
- Position: Placekicker

Personal information
- Born: February 10, 1988 (age 38); West Islip, New York, U.S.
- Listed height: 5 ft 8 in (1.73 m)
- Listed weight: 173 lb (78 kg)

Career information
- High school: Fort Lauderdale (FL) Aquinas
- College: Michigan State
- NFL draft: 2010: undrafted

Career history
- Indianapolis Colts (2010)*
- * Offseason or practice squad member only

Awards and highlights
- First-team Freshman All-American (2006); First-team All-Big Ten (2009); Second-team All-Big Ten (2008)
- Stats at Pro Football Reference

Brett Swenson (born February 10, 1988) is an American former college football player who was a placekicker for the Michigan State Spartans. He was signed by the Indianapolis Colts of the National Football League (NFL) as an undrafted free agent in 2010.

== Early life ==
Brett Swenson was born on February 10, 1988, in West Islip, New York to parents Gary and Celia Swenson. He grew up in Pompano Beach, Florida, and attended Cardinal Gibbons High School in Fort Lauderdale, Florida, for his first three years, where he was a two-year starter in football. As a junior, he recorded a total of 44 points. Swenson made good nine of 11 field goal attempts, including three of 40-yards or longer and a career-best of 49 yards, 17 of 18 extra point attempts, and 19 kickoffs that resulted in touchbacks. That season, he was named a Miami Herald first-team All-Broward County player and a Florida Sports Writers Association (FSWA) Class 3A second-team all-state player.

For his senior year in 2005, Swenson attended St. Thomas Aquinas High School. He recorded a total of 81 points and made seven of 11 field goal and 60 of 61 extra point attempts. He also executed 57 kickoffs for touchbacks. He was named a FSWA Class 5A second-team all-state and South Florida Sun-Sentinel first-team all-county player. Both Scout.com and Rivals.com rated him the fourth-ranked placekicker in the nation.

Swenson was a member of the National Honor Society.

== College career ==
Swenson enrolled at Michigan State University where he majored in criminal justice. As a freshman in 2006, he led the team in scoring with 78 points. He made 15 of 19 field goal and all 33 extra point attempts. Swenson tied for third in the Big Ten Conference with 1.25 field goals per game and 0.789 field goal percentage. He was honored as a Lou Groza Star of the Week for a 28-yard go-ahead field goal against Northwestern with 13 seconds remaining, which capped the greatest comeback in NCAA history. He was named a Football Writers Association of America (FWAA), The Sporting News, College Football News, and Rivals.com first-team freshman All-American. Swenson was also named an honorable mention All-Big Ten player by both the media and coaches.

In 2007, he finished second on the team in scoring with 98 points, behind school record-setting running back Jehuu Caulcrick. Swenson made 15 of 22 field goal and 53 of 54 extra points attempts. He set the school single-season record for extra points, besting Morten Andersen's previous record of 52 in 1978. Swenson finished the season as the tenth-leading scorer in the Big Ten.

In 2008, he compiled 100 points on 22 of 28 field goal and all 34 extra point attempts. Against Indiana, he was named a Lou Groza Star of the Week for a career-high 16 points, career-high four field goals, and career-long 48-yard field goal. Due in part to a missing all three field goal attempts against Michigan, Swenson was not selected as one of the twenty Lou Groza Award semifinalists, which Michigan State associate athletic director for communications John Lewandowski called "remarkably disappointing". The following game, he was named the Big Ten Special Teams Player of the Week for his performance against Wisconsin. He made all four field goal attempts including a game-winning 44-yard kick with seven seconds remaining to put the Spartans ahead 25–24. Swenson was named to the All-Big Ten second-team by both the media and coaches.

In 2009, Swenson was named Team MVP for his role in several games, including a high-scoring victory over Purdue. He participated in the 2010 Senior Bowl. As of January 2010, CBS Sports affiliate The NFL Draft Scout considered him the number-one placekicker prospect for the 2010 NFL draft and projects him being selected in the sixth or seventh round.

== Professional career ==
=== Indianapolis Colts ===
Despite being predicted as a number one kicker, Swenson was not selected in the 2010 NFL draft (not a single kicker was drafted). Afterwards on April 24, 2010, Swenson signed as an undrafted free agent with the Indianapolis Colts. He was placed on injured reserve, and was eventually released on July 28, 2011.
