= Marcus Rush (American football) =

American football player (born 1991)

No. 54
- Position: Linebacker

Personal information
- Born: June 19, 1991 (age 35); Cincinnati, Ohio, U.S.
- Listed height: 6 ft 2 in (1.88 m)
- Listed weight: 251 lb (114 kg)

Career information
- High school: Archbishop Moeller (Cincinnati, Ohio)
- College: Michigan State
- NFL draft: 2015: undrafted

Career history
- San Francisco 49ers (2015–2016)*; Jacksonville Jaguars (2016); Kansas City Chiefs (2017)*; Denver Broncos (2017–2018)*
- * Offseason or practice squad member only

Awards and highlights
- Outback Bowl champion (2012); Buffalo Wild Wings Bowl champion (2012); Rose Bowl champion (2014)
- Stats at Pro Football Reference

Marcus Rush (born June 19, 1991) is an American former football linebacker. He played college football at Michigan State. He was signed by the San Francisco 49ers as an undrafted free agent following the 2015 NFL draft.

== Early life ==
Rush attended Moeller High School where he was rated among the nation's top defensive ends by Scouts, Inc. (#55), Scout.com (#60), and Max Emfinger (#74). He was also named to Super Prep and PrepStar's All-Midwest teams. He was ranked among Ohio's top seniors by Rivals.com (#36) as well as Scout.com (#44).

As a sophomore in 2007, he appeared in eight games and recorded 16 tackles. In 2008, as a junior, he recorded 75 tackles, nine sacks, and two fumble recoveries. For the season, he was named second-team All-Conference. In 2009, as a senior, he finished second on the team in tackles. He recorded 70 tackles (35 solo), 15.5 tackles-for-loss, 11 sacks, four quarterback hurries, four passes defensed, two blocked kicks, and two interceptions. He was named the Great Catholic League South Co-Athlete of the Year after leading the conference in sacks (11) as a senior.

== College career ==
Rush attended Michigan State University, majoring in advertising. In 2010, he redshirt his freshman season. In 2011, as a redshirt freshman, he started all 14 games at defensive end. He recorded 58 tackles, 12 tackles-for-loss, four sacks, five passes defensed, and one forced fumble. For the season, he was named Big Ten Defensive Most Valuable Player (MVP) by ESPN.com, All-Big Ten honorable mention by the coaches and media, first-team Freshman All-American by the Football Writers Association of America (FWAA), Sporting News, and second-team Freshman All-American by Yahoo! Sports, Phil Steele, and CollegeFootballNews.com. He was also named to ESPN.com, Yahoo! Sports, and BTN.com Big Ten All-Freshman team.

As a redshirt sophomore in 2012, he started all 13 games. He recorded 38 tackles (19 solo), 7.5 tackles-for-loss, two sacks, five quarterback hurries, one forced fumble, and five passes defensed. He was named All-Big Ten honorable mention by the coaches and media. In 2013 as a redshirt junior, he started 13-of-14 games. He recorded 30 tackles, 7.5 tackles-for-loss, and five sacks. He was named All-Big Ten honorable mention by the coaches and media. In 2014, as a redshirt senior, he started all 13 games. He recorded 37 tackles, 10.5 tackles-for-loss, and 7.5 sacks. He was named All-Big Ten honorable mention by the coaches and media. He was a co-winner of the team's Downtown Coaches Club Award for outstanding senior on defense. He also won the President's Award.

== Professional career ==
Pre-draft measurables
Height	Weight	40-yard dash	10-yard split	20-yard split	20-yard shuttle	Three-cone drill	Vertical jump	Broad jump	Bench press
6 ft 2 in (1.88 m)	247 lb (112 kg)	4.68 s	1.59 s	2.70 s	4.28 s	6.73 s	34 in (0.86 m)	9 ft 9 in (2.97 m)	24 reps
All values from Michigan State pro day.

=== San Francisco 49ers ===
After going undrafted in the 2015 NFL draft, Rush was signed by the San Francisco 49ers on May 5. He was released during final cuts on September 5 and was signed to the practice squad the next day. After spending his entire rookie season on the practice squad, he signed a reserve/future contract with the 49ers on January 6, 2016.

During the 2016 preseason, Rush led the league in sacks with six. Despite a strong preseason, he was again released by the 49ers during final roster cuts and was signed to the practice squad the next day.

=== Jacksonville Jaguars ===
On December 20, 2016, Rush was signed by the Jacksonville Jaguars off the 49ers' practice squad. On May 9, 2017, Rush was waived by the Jaguars.

=== Kansas City Chiefs ===
On May 30, 2017, Rush was signed by the Kansas City Chiefs. He was waived on September 2, 2017 and was signed to the Chiefs' practice squad the next day. He was released on October 11, 2017.

=== Denver Broncos ===
On December 20, 2017, Rush was signed to the Denver Broncos' practice squad. He signed a reserve/future contract with the Broncos on January 1, 2018.

On September 1, 2018, Rush was waived by the Broncos.
