= 2010 Michigan State Spartans football team =

American college football season

2010 Michigan State Spartans football

Big Ten co-champion

Capital One Bowl, L 7–49 vs. Alabama
- Conference: Big Ten Conference

Ranking
- Coaches: No. 14
- AP: No. 14
- Record: 11–2 (7–1 Big Ten)
- Head coach: Mark Dantonio (4th season; first 3 games, final 8 games); Don Treadwell (games 4–5)
- Offensive coordinator: Don Treadwell (4th season)
- Defensive coordinator: Pat Narduzzi (4th season)
- Captains: Aaron Bates; Kirk Cousins; Greg Jones
- Home stadium: Spartan Stadium (Capacity: 75,005)

2010 Big Ten Conference football standings
	Conf.			Overall
Team	W		L	W		L
No. 14 Michigan State +	7	–	1	11	–	2
No. 7 Wisconsin $+	7	–	1	11	–	2
Iowa	4	–	4	8	–	5
Illinois	4	–	4	7	–	6
Penn State	4	–	4	7	–	6
Michigan	3	–	5	7	–	6
Northwestern	3	–	5	7	–	6
Purdue	2	–	6	4	–	8
Minnesota	2	–	6	3	–	9
Indiana	1	–	7	5	–	7
No. 5 Ohio State† %	0	–	1	0	–	1
$ – BCS representative as conference champion; % – BCS at-large representative; + – Conference co-champions; † – Ohio State (12–1, 7–1) self-vacated all of their wins; Rankings from AP Poll

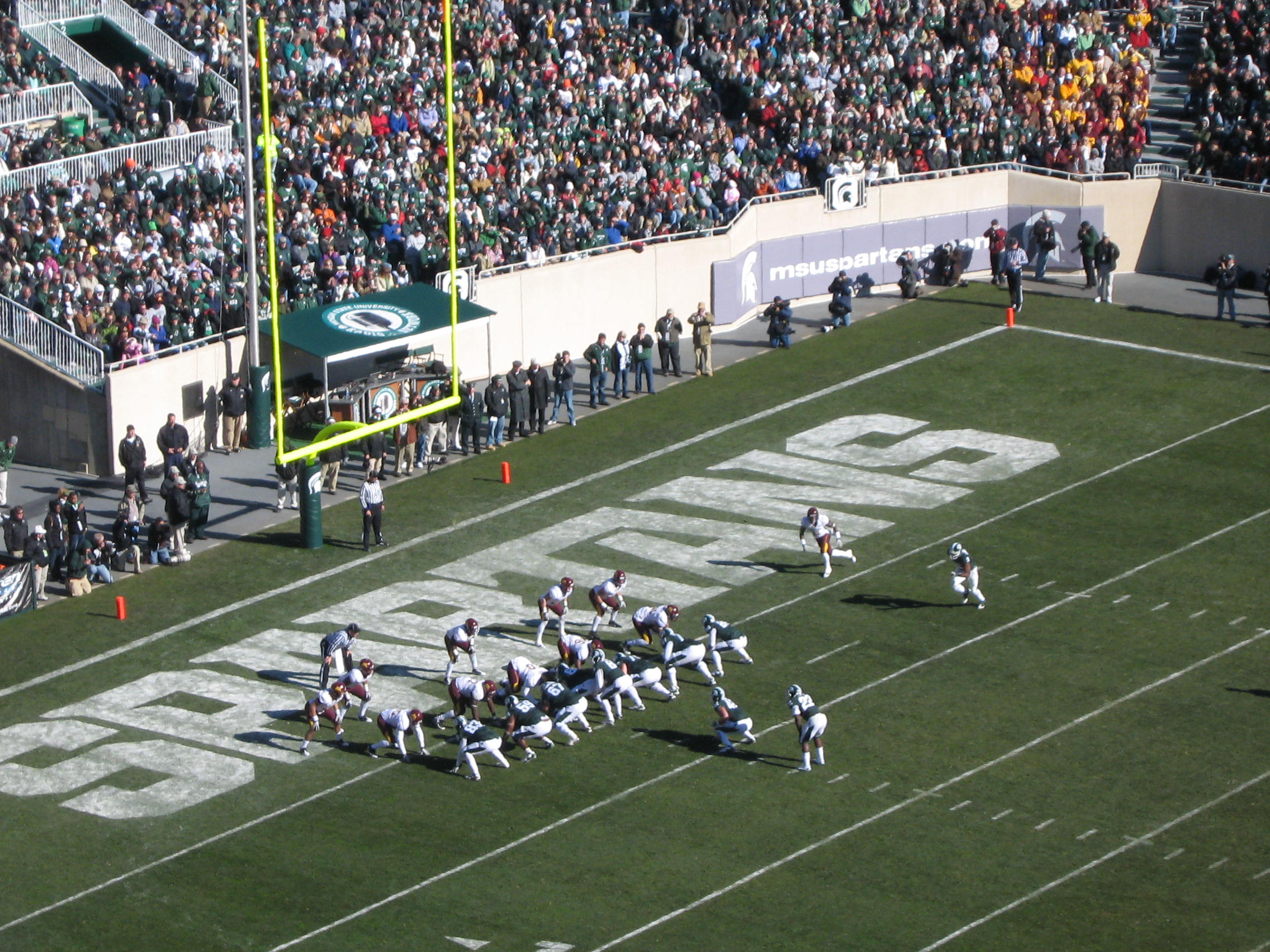
Michigan State vs. Minnesota

The 2010 Michigan State Spartans football team was an American football team that represented Michigan State University as a member of the Big Ten Conference during the 2010 NCAA Division I FBS football season. In their fourth season under head coach Mark Dantonio, the Spartans compiled an 11–2 record (7–1 in conference games), outscored opponents by a total of 383 to 290, and tied for the Big Ten championship. They lost to Alabama in the 2011 Capital One Bowl and were ranked No. 14 in the final AP and Coaches Polls.

In the hours following the Spartans' September 18, 2010 victory over Notre Dame, Dantonio suffered a heart attack for which he was hospitalized, and received a coronary stent. His recovery was complicated by the subsequent development of a blood clot in his leg. While he recovered, offensive coordinator Don Treadwell stepped in as acting head coach, leading the Spartans against Northern Colorado and Wisconsin. Dantonio resumed his head coaching duties for the sixth game of the season against Michigan, although he coached that game and the next week's game against Illinois from the press box instead of the head coach's traditional place on the sidelines. He returned to the sidelines for MSU's road win against Northwestern.

The team's statistical leaders included:

- Quarterback Kirk Cousins completed 226 of 338 passes (66.9%) for 2,825 yards, 20 touchdowns, 10 interceptions, and a 150.7 quarterback rating.
- Running back Edwin Baker tallied 1,201 rushing yards on 207 carries for an average of 5.8 yards per carry.
- Wide receiver Mark Dell caught 51 passes for 788 yards.
- Linebacker Greg Jones led the team with 106 tackles, including 49 solo tackles and 57 assists.
- Placekicker Dan Conroy led the team in scoring with 87 points on 45 extra points and 14 field goals.

The following players received first-team honors on the 2010 All-Big Ten Conference football team: Jones (Coaches-1, Media-1); Conroy (Coaches-1, Media-1); punter Asron Bates (Coaches-2, Media-1); and Baker (Media-1).

The team played its home games in Spartan Stadium in East Lansing, Michigan.

== Schedule ==
Date	Time	Opponent	Rank	Site	TV	Result	Attendance
September 4	12:00 p.m.	Western Michigan*		Spartan Stadium; East Lansing, MI	ESPN2	W 38–14	75,769
September 11	12:00 p.m.	vs. Florida Atlantic*		Ford Field; Detroit, MI	ESPNU	W 30–17	36,124
September 18	8:00 p.m.	Notre Dame*		Spartan Stadium; East Lansing, MI (Megaphone Trophy)	ABC/ESPN2	W 34–31 ^{OT}	78,411
September 25	12:00 p.m.	Northern Colorado*	No. 25	Spartan Stadium; East Lansing, MI	BTN	W 45–7	70,926
October 2	3:30 p.m.	No. 11 Wisconsin	No. 24	Spartan Stadium; East Lansing, MI	ABC/ESPN	W 34–24	73,108
October 9	3:30 p.m.	at No. 18 Michigan	No. 17	Michigan Stadium; Ann Arbor, MI (Paul Bunyan Trophy)	ABC/ESPN	W 34–17	113,065
October 16	12:00 p.m.	Illinois^{†}	No. 13	Spartan Stadium; East Lansing, MI	BTN	W 26–6	74,441
October 23	12:00 p.m.	at Northwestern	No. 8	Ryan Field; Evanston, IL	ESPN	W 35–27	41,115
October 30	3:30 p.m.	at No. 18 Iowa	No. 5	Kinnick Stadium; Iowa City, IA	ABC/ESPN	L 6–37	70,585
November 6	12:00 p.m.	Minnesota	No. 16	Spartan Stadium; East Lansing, MI	BTN	W 31–8	71,128
November 20	12:00 p.m.	Purdue	No. 11	Spartan Stadium; East Lansing, MI	BTN	W 35–31	71,111
November 27	12:00 p.m.	at Penn State	No. 11	Beaver Stadium; State College, PA (Land Grant Trophy)	ESPN2	W 28–22	102,649
January 1, 2011	1:00 p.m.	vs. No. 15 Alabama*	No. 7	Citrus Bowl; Orlando, FL (Capital One Bowl)	ESPN	L 7–49	61,519
*Non-conference game; ^{†}Homecoming; Rankings from AP Poll released prior to the game; All times are in Eastern time

== Game summaries ==
=== Western Michigan ===
Team	1	2	3	4	Total
Western Michigan	0	7	7	0	14
• Michigan State	7	21	7	3	38

- Date: September 4
- Location: Spartan Stadium
  East Lansing, MI
- Game start: 12:01 p.m. EDT
- Elapsed time: 3:21
- Game attendance: 75,769
- Game weather: 60 °F (16 °C), Wind 21 mph (34 km/h) WNW, Partly Cloudy
- Referee: Mike Cannon
- TV announcers (ESPN2):
  Bob Wischusen (Play-by-Play)
  Brian Griese (Analyst)

The Spartans rushing attack was the theme of the day. To open up the scoring, Edwin Baker scampered for 28 yards for a TD. WMU responded with 1-yd TD pass from Alex Carder to Juan Nunez on 4th down. The Spartans would strike early in the 2nd quarter when QB Kirk Cousins hit QB turned WR Keith Nichol on a 20-yd TD pass.

Both offenses then struggled until late in the 2nd quarter when true freshmen Le'Veon Bell broke a 75-yd run. The drive ended with a 7-yd Edwin Baker TD run and the following Spartan drive ended with a 2-yd TD run by Le'Veon Bell. MSU drove down the field at the beginning of the 3rd quarter which ended with an 18-yd TD run by Le'Veon Bell.

WMU would score once more with 2-yd touchdown reception Blake Hammond and that would be it offensively for the Broncos. The Spartans would add a field goal by Dan Conroy and walk away with a season opening win. Le'Veon Bell became the first freshman running back at Michigan State to rush for more than 100 yards in his opening game. He finished with 141 yards on 10 carries and 2 TD's. Edwin Baker also had over 100 yards with 117 yards on 17 carries with 2 TD's.

=== Florida Atlantic ===
Team	1	2	3	4	Total
• Michigan State	10	10	7	3	30
Florida Atlantic	7	0	7	3	17

- Date: September 11
- Location:
  Ford Field
  Detroit, MI
- Game start: 12:00 p.m. EDT
- Elapsed time: 3:00
- Game attendance: 36,124
- Game weather: Indoors
- Referee: Charles Lewis
- TV announcers (ESPNU):
  Rob Stone (Play-by-Play)
  David Pollack (Analyst)

=== Notre Dame ===
Megaphone Trophy: Notre Dame Fighting Irish (1–1) at Michigan State Spartans (2–0)

Quarter	1	2	3	4	OT	Total
Notre Dame	7	0	14	7	3	31
Michigan State	0	7	14	7	6	34

at Spartan Stadium • East Lansing, Michigan

- Date: September 18
- Game time: 8:00 p.m. EDT
- Game weather: Overcast • 61 °F (16 °C) • Wind N 5 miles per hour (8.0 km/h; 4.3 kn)
- Game attendance: 78,411
- Referee: Jerry McGinn
- TV announcers (ABC/ESPN2): Brad Nessler, Todd Blackledge, and Holly Rowe
- Box Score

Game information

Notre Dame

- Dayne Crist
  32/55, 369 Yds, 4 TD, INT
- Armando Allen
  13 Rush, 71 Yds
- Theo Riddick
  10 Rec, 128 Yds, TD

Michigan State

- Kirk Cousins
  23/33, 245 Yds, 2 TD, INT
- Le'Veon Bell
  17 Rush, 114 Yds, TD
- B.J. Cunningham
  7 Rec, 101 Yds, TD

The 2010 rendition of the Battle for the Megaphone Trophy proved to be one of the most memorable in the series, as Michigan State beat Notre Dame 34–31 in overtime.

The Fighting Irish were the first to score, with quarterback Dayne Crist completing a seven-yard touchdown pass to Michael Floyd in the first quarter. After multiple drives ending in turnovers for both teams, the Spartans got on the board with 2:22 left in the first half via a six-yard touchdown pass from Kirk Cousins to Keshawn Martin. The score was 7–7 at the half. Michigan State received the kick-off in the second half, and on their second play from scrimmage, running back Edwin Baker scored a 56-yard touchdown run. Notre Dame's next possession also ended in a touchdown, with a 10-yard touchdown pass from Dayne Crist to tight end Kyle Rudolph. The Spartans and Irish once again traded touchdowns on the next two drives, with Michigan State's Le'Veon Bell scoring a 16-yard touchdown run, followed by Notre Dame scoring via a 15-yard pass from Crist to Theo Riddick, after which the score was 21–21 at the end of the third quarter. Early in the fourth quarter, Dayne Crist completed another touchdown pass for the Irish, this time from 24 yards out, complete to Michael Floyd. The Spartans tied the game with 7:43 left in the game with a 24-yard touchdown pass from Kirk Cousins to B.J. Cunningham. Both teams failed to move the ball for the remainder of the game, and the game was sent to overtime.

In overtime, Notre Dame received the ball first and kicked a 33-yard field goal on 4th and 1. On the Spartans' following possession, Kirk Cousins was sacked on 3rd and 5 for a loss of 9 yards, and the Spartans appeared to line up for a 46-yard field goal attempt to send the game to a second overtime. Instead, kick holder and punter Aaron Bates stood up to pass, and threw downfield to a wide open Charlie Gantt for the game-winning touchdown. Head coach Mark Dantonio divulged after the game that the play was called "Little Giants":

We always name our trick plays after movies. We keep it fun. … We actually put it in on Wednesday. It worked every time. I made the call, ‘Little Giants,’ and I said a little prayer.

— Spartans head coach Mark Dantonio

After the game, Mark Dantonio suffered a mild heart attack and was hospitalized. He had surgery and had a stent put in to relieve a blocked blood vessel leading to the heart. Offensive coordinator Don Treadwill was named acting head coach as Dantonio recovered.

Scoring summary

Quarter	Time	Drive			Team	Scoring information	Score	
Quarter	Time	Plays	Yards	TOP	Team	Scoring information	ND	MSU
1	5:28	9	80	2:24	Notre Dame	Michael Floyd 7-yard touchdown reception from Dayne Crist, David Ruffer kick good	7	0
2	2:22	7	94	3:17	Michigan State	Keshawn Martin 6-yard touchdown reception from Kirk Cousins, Dan Conroy kick good	7	7
3	14:20	2	74	0:35	Michigan State	Edwin Baker 56-yard touchdown run, Dan Conroy kick good	7	14
3	12:25	6	74	1:49	Notre Dame	Kyle Rudolph 10-yard touchdown reception from Dayne Crist, David Ruffer kick good	14	14
3	5:51	11	73	6:29	Michigan State	Le'Veon Bell 16-yard touchdown run, Dan Conroy kick good	14	21
3	1:29	11	77	4:16	Notre Dame	Theo Riddick 15-yard touchdown reception from Dayne Crist, David Ruffer kick good	21	21
4	13:20	5	52	1:29	Notre Dame	Michael Floyd 24-yard touchdown reception from Dayne Crist, David Ruffer kick good	28	21
4	7:43	4	56	2:12	Michigan State	B.J. Cunningham 24-yard touchdown reception from Kirk Cousins, Dan Conroy kick good	28	28
OT		4	9		Notre Dame	33-yard field goal by David Ruffer	31	28
OT		4	25		Michigan State	Charlie Gantt 29-yard touchdown reception from Aaron Bates	31	34
"TOP" = time of possession. For other American football terms, see Glossary of American football.							31	34

=== Northern Colorado ===
Team	1	2	3	4	Total
Northern Colorado	0	0	0	7	7
• #25 Michigan State	14	21	7	3	45

- Date: September 25
- Location:
  Spartan Stadium
  East Lansing, MI
- Game start: 12:01 p.m. EDT
- Elapsed time: 3:01
- Game attendance: 70,926
- Game weather: 53 °F (12 °C), Wind 14 mph (23 km/h) WNW, Partly Cloudy
- Referee: Dave Witvoet
- TV announcers (BTN):
  Mike Morgan (Play-by-Play)
  Muhsin Muhammad (Analyst)
  Stacy Paetz (Sideline)

=== Wisconsin ===
Team	1	2	3	4	Total
#11 Wisconsin	0	10	7	7	24
• #24 Michigan State	3	17	7	7	34

- Date: October 2
- Location: Spartan Stadium
  East Lansing, MI
- Game start: 3:37 p.m. EDT
- Elapsed time: 3:09
- Game attendance: 73,108
- Game weather: 48 °F (9 °C), Wind 15 mph (24 km/h) N, Light Rain
- Referee: John O'Neill
- TV announcers (ABC/ESPN):
  Mike Patrick (Play-by-Play)
  Craig James (Analyst)
  Quint Kessenich (Sideline)

With Coach Dantonio out for a second week following his heart attack, Michigan State hosted eventual co-champs Wisconsin at Spartan Stadium in the conference opener. MSU rolled up 444 yards of offense on the Badgers in a 34–24 win. The Spartans took the lead for good with 8:11 left in the 2nd quarter when Keshawn Martin returned a punt 74 yards for a TD. A clock-draining 15-play TD drive late in the 4th quarter put MSU up by 10 and set the tone for the rest of the Big Ten season.

=== Michigan ===
Paul Bunyan Trophy

Team	1	2	3	4	Total
• #17 Michigan State	0	17	14	3	34
#18 Michigan	3	7	0	7	17

- Date: October 9
- Location: Michigan Stadium
  Ann Arbor, MI
- Game start: 3:35 p.m. EDT
- Elapsed time: 3:10
- Game attendance: 113,065
- Game weather: Mid 70s, Wind: 5–10 mph (8.0–16.1 km/h) E, Clear & Sunny
- Referee: Bill Lemonnier
- TV announcers (ABC/ESPN):
  Sean McDonough (Play-by-Play)
  Matt Millen (Analyst)
  Quint Kessenich (Sideline)

In week 6, Michigan hosted their in-state rivals the Michigan State Spartans for the coveted Paul Bunyan Trophy. This year's meeting marked the 103rd game between the two schools. This was only the second time in the history of the rivalry that both teams enter the game undefeated. The last time was in 1999 when MSU beat Michigan 34–31 in East Lansing. The only score of the first quarter was Michigan's 34-yard field goal. In the second quarter, Michigan State responded with a 61-yard rushing touchdown by Edwin Baker. Michigan briefly took the lead minutes later with a 12-yard catch by Martell Webb. The Spartans responded with a 41-yard run by Le'Veon Bell to take the lead for good. They added to their lead with a 38-yard field goal by Dan Conroy just before halftime. MSU built on their lead in the third quarter with 2 touchdowns: first a 41-yard catch by Mark Dell, and then an 8-yard rush by Larry Caper. Michigan's only points of the second half came on a 4-yard rushing TD by Denard Robinson. Michigan State capped their win with a 28-yard field goal midway through the fourth. Denard Robinson threw three interceptions and was held to only 84 yards rushing.

With this win, Michigan State has defeated Michigan three years in a row, the first time that Michigan State has accomplished that since 1965–67.

=== Illinois ===
Team	1	2	3	4	Total
Illinois	3	3	0	0	6
• #13 Michigan State	0	3	13	10	26

- Date: October 16
- Location:
  Spartan Stadium
  East Lansing, MI
- Game start: 12:00 p.m. EDT
- Elapsed time: 3:06
- Game attendance: 74,441
- Game weather: 54 °F (12 °C), Wind 6 mph (9.7 km/h) WSW, Sunny
- Referee: Todd Geerlings
- TV announcers (BTN):
  Eric Collins (Play-by-Play)
  Chris Martin (Analyst)
  Charissa Thompson (Sideline)

Michigan State came back from a 3–6 deficit while not allowing any second half points to defeat the Illini by 20 points and advance to 7–0 for the first time since 1966, the year they won the national championship.

=== Northwestern ===
Team	1	2	3	4	Total
• #8 Michigan State	0	7	7	21	35
Northwestern	7	10	7	3	27

- Date: October 23rd
- Location:
  Ryan Field
  Evanston, IL
- Game start: 12:01 EDT
- Elapsed time: 3:20
- Game attendance: 41,115
- Game weather: 54 °F (12 °C), Wind 5 mph (8.0 km/h) SW, Light Rain
- Referee: Alex Kemp
- TV announcers (ESPN):
  Dave Pasch (Play-by-Play)
  Bob Griese (Analyst)
  Chris Spielman (Analyst)
  Quint Kessenich (Sideline)

The Spartans found themselves down 17–0 late in the first half, before Kirk Cousins found Mark Dell for a touchdown with 2:34 to go in the second quarter to make it a 17–7 game at halftime. With a ten-point deficit early in the fourth quarter, the Spartans were situated with a 4th and 6 at the Northwestern 30 yd line, but out of field goal range because of a heavy wind. After calling a timeout and taking a delay of game, MSU went out in punt formation. After punter Aaron Bates received the snap, he faked the punt and threw a 15 yd pass to Bennie Fowler for a first down. During the post game interview, Coach Dantonio was asked about the play, when he replied "That's called Mousetrap, and we let 'em take the cheese." The Spartans scored on a Kirk Cousins pass on the next play to make it 24–21. After a Northwestern field goal, the Spartans drove 88 yards in five minutes to take the lead 28–27. The Wildcats went four and out on their next possession, but had another chance to tie the game after Edwin Baker ran for a 25 yd touchdown with a minute left to make it 35–27. However, Michigan State's Eric Gordon intercepted the ball two plays later to ice the game.

=== Iowa ===
Team	1	2	3	4	Total
#5 Michigan State	0	0	0	6	6
• #18 Iowa	17	13	7	0	37

- Date: October 30th
- Location: Kinnick Stadium, Iowa City, IA
- Game start: 3:36 p.m. EDT
- Elapsed time: 3:11
- Game attendance: 70,585
- Game weather: 62 °F (17 °C), Wind 10 mph (16 km/h) WNW, Partly Cloudy
- Referee: Dennis Lipski
- TV announcers (ABC/ESPN):
  Sean McDonough (Play-by-play)
  Matt Millen (Analyst)
  Heather Cox (Sideline)

=== Minnesota ===
Team	1	2	3	4	Total
Minnesota	0	0	0	8	8
• #16 Michigan State	7	14	3	7	31

- Date: November 6
- Location:
  Spartan Stadium
  East Lansing, MI
- Game start: 12:01 p.m. EDT
- Elapsed time: 3:15
- Game attendance: 71,128
- Game weather: 34 °F (1 °C), Wind 4 mph (6.4 km/h) NNW, Sunny
- Referee: Bill LeMonnier
- TV announcers (BTN):
  Tom Hart (Play-by-Play)
  Anthony Herron (Analyst)
  Lisa Byington (Sideline)

=== Purdue ===
Team	1	2	3	4	Total
Purdue	14	7	7	3	31
• #11 Michigan State	7	6	0	22	35

- Date: November 20
- Location: Spartan Stadium
  East Lansing, MI
- Game start: 12:01 p.m. EST
- Elapsed time: 3:14
- Game attendance: 71,111
- Game weather: 39 °F (4 °C), Wind: 6 mph (9.7 km/h) NNW, Partly Cloudy
- Referee: Scott McElwee
- TV announcers (BTN):
  Eric Collins (Play-by-Play)
  Chris Martin (Analyst)
  Charissa Thompson (Sideline)

The Spartans overcame a 15-point deficit to secure their first 7 win undefeated home season.

=== Penn State ===
Land Grant Trophy

Team	1	2	3	4	Total
• #11 Michigan State	7	7	7	7	28
Penn State	3	0	0	19	22

- Date: November 27
- Location: Beaver Stadium
  University Park, PA
- Game start: 12:01 p.m. EST
- Elapsed time: 3:15
- Game attendance: 102,649
- Game weather: 35–36 °F (2 °C), Wind: 18 mph (29 km/h) WNW, Flurries and Windy
- Referee: Dan Capron
- TV announcers (ESPN2):
  Mike Patrick (Play-by-Play)
  Craig James (Analyst)
  Heather Cox (Sideline)

The Spartans secured a share of the Big Ten title, their first conference championship since 1990.

=== Alabama (Capital One Bowl) ===
Capital One Bowl

Team	1	2	3	4	Total
• #15 Alabama	7	21	14	7	49
#7 Michigan State	0	0	0	7	7

- Date: January 1
- Location:
  Citrus Bowl
  Orlando, FL
- Game start: 1:03 p.m. EST
- Elapsed time: 3:12
- Game attendance: 61,519
- Game weather: 77 °F (25 °C), Wind: 13 mph (21 km/h) SSE, Sunny
- Referee: Greg Burks
- TV announcers (ESPN):
  Brad Nessler (Play-by-Play)
  Todd Blackledge (Analyst)
  Holly Rowe (Sideline)

== Rankings ==
Ranking movements Legend: ██ Increase in ranking ██ Decrease in ranking — = Not ranked RV = Received votes
	Week															
Poll	Pre	1	2	3	4	5	6	7	8	9	10	11	12	13	14	Final
AP	—	RV	RV	25	24	17	13	8	5	16	10	11	11	7	7	14
Coaches	RV	RV	RV	23	21	16	11	8	5	15	10	11	10	7	7	14
Harris	Not released						12	8	5	16	10	10	10	7	7	Not released
BCS	Not released							7	5	14	11	12	10	8	8	Not released

== Roster ==
(as of 12/06/2010)
Quarterbacks: 6 Joe Boisture – Freshman; 8 Kirk Cousins – Junior; 10 Andrew Maxwell – (redshirt) Freshman; 12 Peter Badovinac – Sophomore; Wide receivers: 2 Mark Dell – Senior; 3 B. J. Cunningham – Junior; 7 Keith Nichol – Junior; 13 Bennie Fowler – (redshirt) Freshman; 15 Donald Spencer – (redshirt) Freshman; 17 Kyle Nichol – (redshirt) Freshman; 18 Jordan Benton – (redshirt) Freshman; 21 Josh Perryman – Freshman; 23 Eddie Reed - (redshirt) Sophomore; 25 Keith Mumphrey – Freshman; 33 Jeremy Langford – Freshman; 81 Brad Sonntag – Junior; 82 Keshawn Martin – Junior; 87 Milton Colbert – Sophomore; 89 Cam Martin – Junior; Running backs: 4 Edwin Baker – Sophomore; 20 Nick Hill – Freshman; 22 Larry Caper – Sophomore; 24 Le'Veon Bell – Freshman; 26 David Spears – Sophomore; 34 Andre Buford – Sophomore; 37 Chris Hessell (FB) – Sophomore; 38 Nick Palazeti (FB) – Freshman; 42 Nick Bendzuck (FB) – Senior; 44 Josh Rouse (FB) – Senior; 45 Jeff Bobek (FB) – Freshman; 47 Adam Setterbo (FB) – Junior; 48 Drew Stevens (FB) – Sophomore; 86 Fred Smith (FB) – (redshirt) Sophomore	Offensive line: 54 Connor Kruse – Freshman; 58 Hugh Stangeland – (redshirt) Freshman; 59 D. J. Young – Senior; 60 Micajah Reynolds – (redshirt) Freshman; 61 Antonio Jeremiah – Junior; 62 Chris McDonald – Sophomore; 63 Travis Jackson – Freshman; 65 Michael Dennis – Freshman; 66 John Stipek – Senior; 67 Joel Foreman – Junior; 68 Ethan Ruhland – Sophomore; 69 Shawn Kamm – Freshman; 70 Skyler Schofner – Freshman; 71 John Deyo – Sophomore; 72 Nate Klatt – (redshirt) Freshman; 73 Henry Conway – (redshirt) Freshman; 74 Zach Hueter – Sophomore; 75 Jared McGaha – Junior; 77 J'Michael Deane – Senior; 79 David Barrent – (redshirt) Freshman; Tight ends: 83 Charlie Gantt – Senior; 84 Derek Hoebing – (redshirt) Freshman; 85 Garrett Celek – Junior; 88 Brian Linthicum – Junior; 92 Andrew Gleichert – Freshman	Defensive line: 52 Denzel Drone – (redshirt) Freshman; 55 Corey Freeman – Sophomore; 57 Jonathan Strayhorn – Junior; 58 Jordan Sanders – Freshman; 65 Doug Curtis – Sophomore; 69 Blake Pacheco – Junior; 83 R.J. Kelly – Sophomore; 87 Todd Anderson – Junior; 89 Colin Neely – Senior; 91 Tyler Hoover – Sophomore; 93 Blake Treadwell – Sophomore; 94 Taylor Calero – Freshman; 96 Kevin Pickelman – Junior; 97 Dan France – (redshirt) Freshman; 98 Anthony White – Sophomore; 99 Jerel Worthy – Sophomore; Linebackers: 2 William Gholston – Freshman; 10 Chris Norman – Sophomore; 28 Denicos Allen – (redshirt) Freshman; 36 John Misch – Senior; 40 Max Bullough – Freshman; 41 Kyler Elsworth – (redshirt) Freshman; 42 Ty Hamilton – Freshman; 43 Eric Gordon – Senior; 45 Marcus Rush – Freshman; 47 Jeremy Gainer – (redshirt) Freshman; 49 TyQuan Hammock – (redshirt) Freshman; 50 Steve Gardiner – Sophomore; 53 Greg Jones – Senior; 54 Nestor Padilla – Sophomore	Defensive backs: 2 Mylan Hicks – Freshman; 5 Johnny Adams – Sophomore; 9 Isaiah Lewis – Freshman; 11 Marcus Hyde – Senior; 12 Dana Dixon – (redshirt) Freshman; 14 Chase Parker – Junior; 14 Tony Lippett – Freshman; 16 Chris D. Rucker – Junior; 19 Danny Folino – (redshirt) Freshman; 22 Josh Bodell – Senior; 23 Jarius Jones – (redshirt) Freshman; 26 Jesse Johnson – Senior; 27 Kurtis Drummond – Freshman; 29 Chris L. Rucker – Senior; 31 Darqueze Dennard – Freshman; 32 Mitchell White – Sophomore; 39 Trenton Robinson – Junior; Punters: 3 Mike Sadler – Freshman; 18 Aaron Bates – Senior; 20 Kyle Selden – Junior; Place kickers: 4 Dan Conroy – Sophomore; 17 Kevin Muma – (redshirt) Freshman; Long snappers: 51 Steve Moore – Sophomore; 56 Alex Shackleton – Senior

== Coaching staff ==
- Mark Dantonio – Head Coach
- Don Treadwell – Offensive Coordinator/Wide Receivers coach
- Dave Warner – Quarterbacks coach
- Brad Salem – Running backs coach
- Mark Staten – Tight ends coach/Tackles/Recruiting Coordinator
- Dan Roushar – Offensive line coach
- Pat Narduzzi – Defensive Coordinator
- Ted Gill – Defensive line coach
- Mike Tressel – Linebackers coach/Special Teams Coordinator
- Harlon Barnett – Secondary coach

== 2011 NFL draft ==
Michigan State had two players selected in the 2011 NFL draft.

Player	Round	Pick	Position	NFL team
Greg Jones	6	185	Linebacker	New York Giants
Chris L. Rucker	6	188	Cornerback	Indianapolis Colts
