= 2007 Michigan State Spartans football team =

American college football season

2007 Michigan State Spartans football

Champs Sports Bowl, L 21–24 vs. Boston College
- Conference: Big Ten Conference
- Record: 7–6 (3–5 Big Ten)
- Head coach: Mark Dantonio (1st season)
- Offensive coordinator: Don Treadwell (1st season)
- Defensive coordinator: Pat Narduzzi (1st season)
- Home stadium: Spartan Stadium

2007 Big Ten Conference football standings
	Conf.			Overall
Team	W		L	W		L
No. 5 Ohio State $	7	–	1	11	–	2
No. 18 Michigan	6	–	2	9	–	4
No. 20 Illinois %	6	–	2	9	–	4
No. 24 Wisconsin	5	–	3	9	–	4
Penn State	4	–	4	9	–	4
Iowa	4	–	4	6	–	6
Purdue	3	–	5	8	–	5
Indiana	3	–	5	7	–	6
Michigan State	3	–	5	7	–	6
Northwestern	3	–	5	6	–	6
Minnesota	0	–	8	1	–	11
$ – BCS representative as conference champion; % – BCS at-large representative; Rankings from AP Poll

The 2007 Michigan State Spartans football team represented Michigan State University in the 2007 NCAA Division I FBS football season. Mark Dantonio began his first season as the Spartans' head coach. The Spartans play their home games at Spartan Stadium in East Lansing, Michigan.

== Schedule ==
Date	Time	Opponent	Rank	Site	TV	Result	Attendance
September 1	12:00 p.m.	UAB*		Spartan Stadium; East Lansing, MI	ESPN2	W 55–18	67,796
September 8	12:00 p.m.	Bowling Green*		Spartan Stadium; East Lansing, MI	BTN	W 28–17	67,276
September 15	12:00 p.m.	Pittsburgh*		Spartan Stadium; East Lansing, MI	ESPN	W 17–13	68,620
September 22	3:30 p.m.	at Notre Dame*		Notre Dame Stadium; Notre Dame, IN (Megaphone Trophy)	NBC	W 31–14	80,795
September 29	3:30 p.m.	at No. 9 Wisconsin	No. 23	Camp Randall Stadium; Madison, WI	ABC/ESPN	L 34–37	82,164
October 6	12:00 p.m.	Northwestern		Spartan Stadium; East Lansing, MI	BTN	L 41–48 ^{OT}	67,378
October 13	7:00 p.m.	Indiana^{†}		Spartan Stadium; East Lansing, MI (Old Brass Spittoon)	BTN	W 52–27	73,449
October 20	3:30 p.m.	at No. 1 Ohio State		Ohio Stadium; Columbus, OH	ABC/ESPN2	L 17–24	105,287
October 27	12:00 p.m.	at Iowa		Kinnick Stadium; Iowa City, IA	ESPN2	L 27–34 ^{2OT}	70,585
November 3	3:30 p.m.	No. 14 Michigan		Spartan Stadium; East Lansing, MI (Paul Bunyan Trophy)	ABC/ESPN	L 24–28	77,009
November 10	12:00 p.m.	at Purdue		Ross–Ade Stadium; West Lafayette, IN	BTN	W 48–31	55,630
November 17	3:30 p.m.	No. 22 Penn State		Spartan Stadium; East Lansing, MI (Land Grant Trophy)	ABC/ESPN	W 35–31	72,251
December 28	1:00 p.m.	vs. No. 14 Boston College*		Florida Citrus Bowl; Orlando, FL (Champs Sports Bowl)	ESPN	L 21–24	46,554
*Non-conference game; ^{†}Homecoming; Rankings from Coaches Polls released prior to game; All times are in Eastern time

== Game summaries ==
=== UAB ===
UAB at Michigan State

Team	1	2	3	4	Total
UAB	0	3	2	13	18
• Michigan State	21	24	3	7	55

- Date: September 1
- Location:
  Spartan Stadium
  East Lansing, MI
- Game start: 12:02 p.m. EST
- Elapsed time: 3:22
- Game attendance: 67,796
- Game weather: 72 °F (22 °C), Wind 3 mph (4.8 km/h) SSW, Sunny
- Referee: Ron Tolbert
- TV announcers (ESPN2):
  Pam Ward (Play-by-play)
  Ray Bentley (Analyst)
  Quint Kessenich (Sideline)

=== Bowling Green ===
Bowling Green at Michigan State

Team	1	2	3	4	Total
Bowling Green	0	14	3	0	17
• Michigan State	7	7	7	7	28

- Date: September 8
- Location:
  Spartan Stadium
  East Lansing, MI
- Game start: 12:07 p.m. EST
- Elapsed time: 3:20
- Game attendance: 67,276
- Game weather: 70 °F (21 °C), Wind 3 mph (4.8 km/h) Variable, Sunny
- Referee: Dennis Lipski
- TV announcers (BTN):
  Wayne Larrivee (Play-by-play)
  Chris Martin (Analyst)
  Lisa Byington (Sideline)

=== Pittsburgh ===
Pittsburgh at Michigan State

Team	1	2	3	4	Total
Pittsburgh	0	7	3	3	13
• Michigan State	0	14	0	3	17

- Date: September 15
- Location:
  Spartan Stadium
  East Lansing, MI
- Game start: 12:02 p.m. EST
- Elapsed time: 3:23
- Game attendance: 68,620
- Game weather: 50 °F (10 °C), Wind 8 mph (13 km/h) N, Partly Cloudy
- Referee: John McDaid
- TV announcers (ESPN):
  Dave Pasch (Play-by-play)
  Andre Ware (Analyst)
  Quint Kessenich (Sideline)

Scoring summary
Q2	14:15	MSU	Caulcrick 2 yard run (Swenson kick)	MSU 7–0
Q2	13:54	PITT	McCoy 64 yard run (Lee kick)	Tie 7–7
Q2	11:00	MSU	Key 31 yard interception return (Swenson kick)	MSU 14–7
Q3	2:13	PITT	Lee 41 yard field goal	MSU 14–10
Q4	7:47	PITT	Lee 29 yard field goal	MSU 14–13
Q4	2:54	MSU	Swenson 23 yard field goal	MSU 17–13

=== Notre Dame ===
Michigan State at Notre Dame
(Megaphone Trophy)

Team	1	2	3	4	Total
• Michigan State	14	3	14	0	31
Notre Dame	7	7	0	0	14

- Date: September 22
- Location:
  Notre Dame Stadium
  Notre Dame, IN
- Game start: 3:43 p.m. EST
- Elapsed time: 3:19
- Game attendance: 80,795
- Game weather: 73 °F (23 °C), Wind 8 mph (13 km/h) NW, Sunny
- Referee: Stephon Pamon
- TV announcers (NBC):
  Tom Hammond (Play-by-play)
  Pat Haden (Analyst)
  Alex Flanagan (Sideline)

Scoring summary
Q1	10:01	ND	Thomas 1 yard run (Walker kick)	ND 7–0
Q1	7:05	MSU	Thomas 7 yard pass from Hoyer (Swenson kick)	Tie 7–7
Q1	:22	MSU	Davis 3 yard pass from Hoyer (Swenson kick)	MSU 14–7
Q2	12:19	MSU	Swenson 27 yard field goal	MSU 17–7
Q2	10:41	ND	Hughes 3 yard run (Walker kick)	MSU 17–14
Q3	12:05	MSU	Dell 16 yard pass from Hoyer (Swenson kick)	MSU 24–14
Q3	2:45	MSU	Davis 30 yard pass from Hoyer (Swenson kick)	MSU 31–14

=== Wisconsin ===
Michigan State at Wisconsin

Team	1	2	3	4	Total
Michigan State	14	7	3	10	34
• Wisconsin	7	20	7	3	37

- Date: September 29
- Location: Camp Randall Stadium
  Madison, WI
- Game start: 3:35 EST
- Elapsed time: 3:40
- Game attendance: 82,164
- Game weather: 70 °F (21 °C), Wind 12 mph (19 km/h) S, Cloudy
- Referee: Dan Capron
- TV announcers (ABC/ESPN):
  Brad Nessler (Play-by-play)
  Bob Griese (Analyst)
  Paul Maguire (Analyst)
  Bonnie Bernstein (Sideline)

Scoring summary
1	10:11	UW	Hill, PJ 5 yd run (Mehlhaff, Taylor kick)	UW 7-0
1	5:57	MSU	Caulcrick, Jehuu 2 yd run (Swenson, Brett kick)	Tie 7-7
1	2:27	MSU	Caulcrick, Jehuu 2 yd run (Swenson, Brett kick)	MSU 14-7
2	12:49	UW	Beckum, Travis 2 yd pass from Donovan, Tyler (Mehlhaff, Taylor kick)	Tie 14-14
2	8:35	UW	Jefferson, Kyle 64 yd pass from Donovan, Tyler (Mehlhaff, Taylor kick)	UW 21-14
2	8:22	MSU	Thomas, Devin 80 yd pass from Hoyer, Brian (Swenson, Brett kick)	Tie 21-21
2	1:51	UW	Mehlhaff, Taylor 35 yd field goal	UW 24-21
2	0:01	UW	Mehlhaff, Taylor 47 yd field goal	UW 27-21
3	12:23	MSU	Swenson, Brett 19 yd field goal	UW 27-24
3	9:13	UW	Hill, PJ 1 yd run (Mehlhaff, Taylor kick)	UW 34-24
4	13:54	MSU	Dell, Mark 3 yd pass from Hoyer, Brian (Swenson, Brett kick)	UW 34-31
4	12:14	MSU	Swenson, Brett 35 yd field goal	Tie 34-34
4	6:15	UW	Mehlhaff, Taylor 22 yd field goal	UW 37-34

=== Northwestern ===
Northwestern at Michigan State

Team	1	2	3	4	OT	Total
• Northwestern	13	7	7	14	7	48
Michigan State	6	7	14	14	0	41

- Date: October 6
- Location:
  Spartan Stadium
  East Lansing, MI
- Game start: 12:07 p.m. EST
- Elapsed time: 3:38
- Game attendance: 67,378
- Game weather: 81 °F (27 °C), Wind 9 mph (14 km/h) WSW, Mostly Sunny
- Referee: John O'Neill
- TV announcers (BTN):
  Wayne Larrivee (Play-by-play)
  Charles Davis (Analyst)
  Charissa Thompson (Sideline)

=== Indiana ===
Indiana at Michigan State
(Old Brass Spittoon)

Team	1	2	3	4	Total
Indiana	10	3	14	0	27
• Michigan State	17	7	21	7	52

- Date: October 13
- Location: Spartan Stadium, East Lansing, MI
- Game start: 7:07 p.m. EST
- Elapsed time: 3:14
- Game attendance: 73,449
- Game weather: 52 °F (11 °C), Wind 9 mph (14 km/h) W, Clear
- Referee: Bill LeMonnier
- TV announcers (BTN):
  Wayne Larrivee (Play-by-play)
  Chris Martin (Analyst)
  Lisa Byington (Sideline)

Scoring summary
Q1	9:57	MSU	Caulcrick 1 yard run (Swenson kick)	MSU 7–0
Q1	9:42	IND	Lewis 59 yard run (Starr kick)	Tie 7–7
Q1	5:32	MSU	Ringer 3 yard run (Swenson kick)	MSU 14–7
Q1	2:45	MSU	Swenson 23 yard field goal	MSU 17–7
Q1	:30	IND	Starr 40 yard field goal	MSU 17–10
Q2	13:33	MSU	Ringer 64 yard run (Swenson kick)	MSU 24–10
Q2	3:42	IND	Starr 47 yard field goal	MSU 24–13
Q3	11:00	MSU	Thomas 34 yard pass from Hoyer (Swenson kick)	MSU 31–13
Q3	7:09	MSU	Caulcrick 2 yard run (Swenson kick)	MSU 38–13
Q3	4:59	MSU	Baldwin 12 yard fumble return (Swenson kick)	MSU 45–13
Q3	1:47	IND	Hardy 37 yard pass from Lewis (Starr kick)	MSU 45–20
Q3	:01	IND	Porter 76 yard fumble return (Starr kick)	MSU 45–27
Q4	8:23	MSU	Caulcrick 3 yard run (Swenson kick)	MSU 52–27

=== Ohio State ===
Michigan State at Ohio State

Team	1	2	3	4	Total
Michigan State	0	0	14	3	17
• Ohio State	10	7	7	0	24

- Date: October 20
- Location:
  Ohio Stadium
  Columbus, OH
- Game start: 3:38 EST
- Elapsed time: 2:54
- Game attendance: 105,287
- Game weather: 70 °F (21 °C), Wind 18 mph (29 km/h) W, Sunny
- Referee: Dennis Lipski
- TV announcers (ABC/ESPN):
  Brad Nessler (Play-by-play)
  Bob Griese (Analyst)
  Paul Maguire (Analyst)
  Bonnie Bernstein (Sideline)

Scoring summary
1	11:50	OSU	Ballard, Jake 14 yd pass from Boeckman, Todd (Pretorius, Ryan kick)	OSU 7-0
1	3:40	OSU	Pretorius, Ryan 42 yd field goal	OSU 10-0
2	10:15	OSU	Wells, Chris 5 yd run (Pretorius, Ryan kick)	OSU 17-0
3	6:52	OSU	Robiskie, Brian 50 yd pass from Boeckman, Todd (Pretorius, Ryan kick)	OSU 24-0
3	3:52	MSU	Wiley, Otis 54 yd interception return (Swenson, Brett kick)	OSU 24-7
3	2:56	MSU	Adams, SirDarean 25 yd fumble recovery (Swenson, Brett kick)	OSU 24-14
4	3:42	MSU	Swenson, Brett 43 yd field goal	OSU 24-17

=== Iowa ===
Michigan State at Iowa

Team	1	2	3	4	OT	2OT	Total
Michigan State	7	10	0	3	7	0	27
• Iowa	0	3	14	3	7	7	34

- Date: October 27
- Location:
  Kinnick Stadium
  Iowa City, IA
- Game start: 12:05 EST
- Elapsed time: 3:30
- Game attendance: 70,585
- Game weather: 51 °F (11 °C), Wind 17 mph (27 km/h) NNW, Sunny
- Referee: Dave Witvoet
- TV announcers (ESPN2):
  Dave Pasch (Play-by-play)
  Andre Ware (Analyst)
  Quint Kessenich (Sideline)

Scoring summary
1	5:10	MSU	Caulcrick, Jehuu 1 yd run (Swenson, Brett kick)	MSU 7-0
2	14:10	MSU	Swenson, Brett 46 yd field goal	MSU 10-0
2	6:40	Iowa	Murray, Daniel 43 yd field goal	MSU 10-3
2	2:12	MSU	Caulcrick, Jehuu 1 yd run (Swenson, Brett kick)	MSU 17-3
3	10:07	Iowa	Young, Albert 26 yd run (Murray, Daniel kick)	MSU 17-10
3	3:57	Iowa	Young, Albert 3 yd run (Murray, Daniel kick)	Tie 17-17
4	10:05	Iowa	Murray, Daniel 47 yd field goal	Iowa 20-17
4	0:04	MSU	Swenson, Brett 29 yd field goal	Tie 20-20
OT	0:00	MSU	Caulcrick, Jehuu 3 yd run (Swenson, Brett kick)	MSU 27-20
OT	0:00	Iowa	Chaney, Jr., P. 23 yd pass from Christensen, J. (Murray, Daniel kick)	Tie 27-27
OT2	0:00	Iowa	Pugh, Jevon 1 yd run (Murray, Daniel kick)	Iowa 34-27

=== Michigan ===
Michigan at Michigan State

Team	1	2	3	4	Total
• #15 Michigan	7	7	0	14	28
Michigan State	3	0	7	14	24

- Date: November 3
- Location:
  Spartan Stadium
  East Lansing, MI
- Game start: 3:30 p.m. EST
- Elapsed time: 3:36
- Game attendance: 77,009
- Game weather: 54 °F (12 °C), Wind 14 mph (23 km/h) WNW, Partly Cloudy
- Referee: Bill LeMonnier
- TV announcers (ABC/ESPN):
  Brad Nessler (Play-by-play)
  Bob Griese (Analyst)
  Paul Maguire (Analyst)
  Bonnie Bernstein (Sideline)

Scoring summary
1	11:28	MSU	Brett Swenson 36-yard field goal	MSU 3-0
1	3:54	MICH	Mario Manningham 11-yard pass from Chad Henne (K.C. Lopata kick)	MICH 7-3
2	12:46	MICH	Carson Butler 5-yard pass from Chad Henne (K.C. Lopata kick)	MICH 14-3
3	6:32	MSU	Jehuu Caulcrick 1-yard run (Brett Swenson kick)	MICH 14-10
4	14:55	MSU	Kellen Davis 5-yard pass from Brian Hoyer (Brett Swenson kick)	MSU 17-14
4	7:40	MSU	Jehuu Caulcrick 1-yard run (Brett Swenson kick)	MSU 24-14
4	6:47	MICH	Greg Mathews 14-yard pass from Chad Henne (K.C. Lopata kick)	MSU 24-21
4	2:28	MICH	Mario Manningham 31-yard pass from Chad Henne (K.C. Lopata kick)	MICH 28-24

=== Purdue ===
Michigan State at Purdue

Team	1	2	3	4	Total
• Michigan State	7	24	0	17	48
Purdue	0	21	3	7	31

- Date: November 10
- Location: Ross–Ade Stadium, West Lafayette, IN
- Game start: 12:09 p.m. EST
- Elapsed time: 3:25
- Game attendance: 55,630
- Game weather: 44 °F (7 °C), Wind: Calm, Sunny
- Referee: Dan Capron
- TV announcers (BTN):
  Thom Brennaman (Play-by-play)
  Charles Davis (Analyst)
  Charissa Thompson (Sideline)

Scoring summary
Q1	3:36	MSU	Hoyer 1 yard run (Swenson kick)	MSU 7–0
Q2	14:26	PUR	Painter 27 yard run (Summers kick)	Tie 7–7
Q2	8:09	MSU	Davis 2 yard pass from Hoyer (Swenson kick)	MSU 14–7
Q2	7:16	PUR	Sheets 59 yard run (Summers kick)	Tie 14–14
Q2	4:02	MSU	Caulcrick 2 yard run (Swenson kick)	MSU 21–14
Q2	3:33	PUR	Painter 7 yard run (Summers kick)	Tie 21–21
Q2	1:13	MSU	Caulcrick 1 yard run (Swenson kick)	MSU 28–21
Q2	:00	MSU	Swenson 39 yard field goal	MSU 31–21
Q3	7:05	PUR	Summers 32 yard field goal	MSU 31–24
Q4	14:54	MSU	Swenson 23 yard field goal	MSU 34–24
Q4	13:57	MSU	Key 20 yard fumble return (Swenson kick)	MSU 41–24
Q4	13:05	PUR	Sheets 41 yard pass from Painter (Summers kick)	MSU 41–31
Q4	7:36	MSU	Andino 3 yard pass from Hoyer (Swenson kick)	MSU 48–31

=== Penn State ===
Penn State at Michigan State
(Land Grant Trophy)

Team	1	2	3	4	Total
Penn State	7	10	7	7	31
• Michigan State	7	0	14	14	35

- Date: November 17
- Location: Spartan Stadium, East Lansing, MI
- Game start: 3:42 p.m. EST
- Elapsed time: 3:21
- Game attendance: 72,251
- Game weather: 36 °F (2 °C), Wind 7 mph (11 km/h) ENE, Light Rain
- Referee: Dave Witvoet
- TV announcers (ABC/ESPN):
  Terry Gannon (Play-by-play)
  David Norrie (Analyst)
  Jeannine Edwards (Sideline)

Scoring summary
Q1	8:42	MSU	Thomas 12 yard pass from Hoyer (Swenson kick)	MSU 7–0
Q1	3:53	PSU	Butler 37 yard pass from Morelli (Kelly kick)	Tie 7–7
Q2	14:10	PSU	Kelly 21 yard field goal	PSU 10–7
Q2	:08	PSU	Kinlaw 4 yard run (Kelly kick)	PSU 17–7
Q3	10:11	PSU	Kelly 5 yard run (Kelly kick)	PSU 24–7
Q3	7:25	MSU	McPherson 3 yard pass from Hoyer (Swenson kick)	PSU 24–14
Q3	2:20	MSU	Thomas 20 yard pass from Hoyer (Swenson kick)	PSU 24–21
Q4	13:02	PSU	Kinlaw 4 yard run (Kelly kick)	PSU 31–21
Q4	11:04	MSU	Thomas 26 yard pass from Hoyer (Swenson kick)	PSU 31–28
Q4	4:08	MSU	Caulcrick 1 yard run (Swenson kick)	MSU 35–31

- Devin Thomas 7 Rec, 139 Yds
- Kellen Davis 4 Rec, 106 Yds

=== Boston College (Champs Sports Bowl) ===
Boston College vs Michigan State
(Champs Sports Bowl)

Team	1	2	3	4	Total
• Boston College	7	7	3	7	24
Michigan State	7	3	3	8	21

- Date: December 28
- Location:
  Citrus Bowl
  Orlando, FL
- Game start: 5:04 p.m. EST
- Elapsed time: 3:34
- Game attendance: 46,554
- Game weather: 79 °F (26 °C), Wind 9 mph (14 km/h) ESE, Partly Cloudy
- Referee: Randy Christal
- TV announcers (ESPN):
  Mike Patrick (Play-by-play)
  Todd Blackledge (Analyst)
  Holly Rowe (Sideline)

Scoring summary
Q1	13:23	MSU	Kellen Davis 18 yard pass from Hoyer (Swenson kick)	MSU 7–0
Q1	0:36	BC	J. Loyte 1 yard pass from Matt Ryan (Aponavicious kick)	Tie 7–7
Q2	8:54	BC	Gunnell, R 29 yd pass from Ryan, M (Aponavicius kick)	BC 14–7
Q2	2:17	MSU	Swenson, Brett 39 yd field goal	BC 14-10
Q3	8:21	MSU	Swenson, Brett 23 yd field goal	BC 14–13
Q3	5:10	BC	Aponavicius, S 28 yd field goal	BC 17–13
Q3	9:21	BC	Gunnell, R 68 yd pass from Matt Ryan (Aponavicius)	BC 24–13
Q4	6:04	MSU	Curry, Deon 14 yd pass from Hoyer, Brian (Davis, Kellen pass from Hoyer, Brian)	BC 24–21

== Coaching staff ==
- Mark Dantonio – Head Coach
- Don Treadwell – Offensive Coordinator/Wide Receivers coach
- Dave Warner – Quarterbacks coach
- Dan Enos – Running backs coach
- Mark Staten – Tight ends coach/Recruiting Coordinator
- Dan Roushar – Offensive line coach
- Pat Narduzzi – Defensive Coordinator
- Ted Gill – Defensive line coach
- Mike Tressel – Linebackers coach/Special Teams Coordinator
- Harlon Barnett – Secondary coach

== 2008 NFL draft ==
The following players were selected in the 2008 NFL draft.

Player	Round	Pick	Position	NFL team
Devin Thomas	2	34	Wide Receiver	Washington Redskins
Kellen Davis	5	158	Tight End	Chicago Bears
Ervin Baldwin	7	208	Defensive End	Chicago Bears
