= Tony Lippett =

American football player (born 1992)

No. 36, 24
- Position: Cornerback

Personal information
- Born: July 2, 1992 (age 34); Detroit, Michigan, U.S.
- Listed height: 6 ft 2 in (1.88 m)
- Listed weight: 192 lb (87 kg)

Career information
- High school: Crockett (Detroit)
- College: Michigan State
- NFL draft: 2015: 5th round, 156th overall pick

Career history
- Miami Dolphins (2015–2017); New York Giants (2018); Cincinnati Bengals (2019)*; Saskatchewan Roughriders (2020–2021)
- * Offseason or practice squad member only

Awards and highlights
- Big Ten Receiver of the Year (2014); First-team All-Big Ten (2014)

Career NFL statistics
- Total tackles: 81
- Pass deflections: 12
- Interceptions: 4
- Stats at Pro Football Reference

Tony Lippett (born July 2, 1992) is an American former professional football player who was a cornerback in the National Football League (NFL). He played college football for the Michigan State Spartans, and was selected by the Miami Dolphins in the fifth round of the 2015 NFL draft.

== Early life ==
Lippett attended Crockett High School in Detroit, Michigan, where he was a two-sport star in both football and track. He was a three-year starter on both sides of the ball (quarterback and cornerback) for the Crockett Rockets high school football team. As a junior in 2008, Lippett registered 36 tackles (32 solos, 4 assists) and three interceptions as a defensive back. On offense, he accounted for 2,749 total yards and 23 touchdowns. He completed 157-of-219 throws for 1,967 yards, 13 touchdowns, and 12 interceptions, and carried the ball 87 times for 782 yards and 10 more scores in 2008. As a senior in 2009, Lippett was an Associated Press (AP) All-State selection as a defensive back after recording 55 tackles (36 solos, 19 assists) and nine interceptions (45 return yards). On offense, he accounted for 3,014 total yards and 30 touchdowns while leading the Rockets to a 10-2 record. He completed 116-of-187 passes for 2,066 yards, 17 touchdowns and six interceptions, while also rushing 105 times for 948 yards and 13 more scores, earning All-Metro Detroit honors. He represented the East squad in the 2010 Michigan High School All-Star Game, played June 19 in Spartan Stadium, and led all receivers with four catches for 95 yards.

Also a standout track & field athlete, Lippett competed as a sprinter during his junior and senior seasons, participating in the sprint relays and the open 100m and 200-meters for Crockett. As a junior, he was 2nd in the 200-meter dash in the city (22.39 s) and the 4th in the state (23.06 s). He clocked a personal-best of 10.7 seconds in the 100-meter dash prior to his senior season, and was also timed routinely at 4.5 seconds in the 40-yard dash.

Lippett is a cousin of former New England Patriots cornerback Ronnie Lippett.

Lippett was rated among the nation's top wide receivers by Scout.com (No. 62). He was named to SuperPrep's and PrepStar's All-Midwest Teams. He was listed among the state's top seniors by Scout.com (No. 13), Detroit Free Press (No. 13), Lansing State Journal (No. 16), The Detroit News (No. 17) and Rivals.com (No. 19).

== College career ==
Lippett started his career at Michigan State University as a cornerback. After he was redshirted as a freshman in 2010, Lippett appeared in all 14 games in 2011 with five starts. He finished the year with 18 tackles and four receptions for 44 yards. Prior to his sophomore season in 2012, he was moved to wide receiver full-time. He finished with 36 receptions for 392 yards and two touchdowns in 13 games. As a junior in 2013, he started 10 of 14 games and had a team-leading 44 receptions with 613 yards and two touchdowns. Lippett remained a starter his senior season in 2014. He had 65 receptions for 1,198 yards with 11 touchdowns and was named a first-team All-Big Ten Conference selection.

=== Statistics ===
Year	Team	Games		Receiving				Defense				
Year	Team	GP	GS	Rec	Yards	Avg	TD	Solo	Ast	Total	TFL	Sck
2010	Michigan State	Redshirt (redshirt)										
2011	Michigan State	14	5	4	44	11.0	0	9	9	18	0.5	0.0
2012	Michigan State	13	0	36	392	10.9	2	0	0	0	0.0	0.0
2013	Michigan State	14	10	44	613	13.9	2	1	0	1	0.0	0.0
2014	Michigan State	13	13	65	1,198	18.4	11	4	0	4	0.0	0.0
Career		54	28	149	2,247	15.1	15	14	9	23	0.5	0.0

== Professional career ==
Pre-draft measurables
Height	Weight	40-yard dash	10-yard split	20-yard split	20-yard shuttle	Three-cone drill	Vertical jump	Broad jump	Bench press
6 ft 2 in (1.88 m)	192 lb (87 kg)	4.56 s	1.67 s	2.65 s	4.13 s	6.92 s	36 in (0.91 m)	9 ft 6 in (2.90 m)	10 reps
All values from NFL Combine and Pro Day

=== Miami Dolphins ===
Lippett was drafted by the Miami Dolphins in the fifth round (156th overall) of the 2015 NFL draft.

Lippett became a starter in his second season after primarily playing on special teams as a rookie. He started 13 games, finished fourth on the team with 67 tackles, second on the team with four passes defensed, and leading the team with four interceptions.

In training camp in 2017, Lippett suffered a torn Achilles tendon and was ruled out for the season. He was placed on injured reserve on September 2, 2017.

On September 1, 2018, Lippett was released by the Dolphins.

=== New York Giants ===
On October 25, 2018, Lippett was signed by the New York Giants. On March 14, 2019, he re-signed with the Giants. He was released on July 24, 2019.

=== Cincinnati Bengals ===
On July 30, 2019, Lippett signed with the Cincinnati Bengals. He was waived during final roster cuts on August 30, 2019.

=== Saskatchewan Roughriders ===
Lippett signed with the Saskatchewan Roughriders of the Canadian Football League on May 4, 2020. He was placed on the suspended list on July 3, 2021.
