= Scott Greene =

American football player and coach (born 1972)

No. 43
- Position: Running back

Personal information
- Born: June 1, 1972 (age 54); Canandaigua, New York, U.S.
- Listed height: 5 ft 11 in (1.80 m)
- Listed weight: 240 lb (109 kg)

Career information
- High school: Canandaigua
- College: Michigan State
- NFL draft: 1996: 6th round, 193rd overall pick

Career history

Playing
- Carolina Panthers (1996–1997); Indianapolis Colts (1998–1999)

Coaching
- McQuaid Jesuit HS (NY) (2002–2004) Special teams coordinator & inside linebackers coach; Rochester (NY) (2005) Special teams coordinator & linebackers coach; Rochester (NY) (2006–2017) Head coach

Career NFL statistics
- Rushing yards: 157
- Rushing average: 3.5
- Receptions: 44
- Receiving yards: 290
- Total touchdowns: 3
- Stats at Pro Football Reference

Head coaching record
- Regular season: 50–62 (.446)
- Postseason: 0–2 (.000)
- Career: 50–64 (.439)

Scott Clayton Greene (born June 1, 1972) is an American former professional football player who was a running back for four seasons with the Carolina Panthers and Indianapolis Colts. of the National Football League (NFL). Greene attended Canandaigua Academy and holds many football records there. He was the Section V player of the year while at Canadaigua Academy in 1991. Greene was inducted into the Canandaigua Academy Athletic Hall of Fame in 2001. He played college football for the Michigan State Spartans and was selected in the sixth round of the 1996 NFL draft.

== Coaching career ==
Greene served as a volunteer special teams coordinator and inside linebackers coach for McQuaid Jesuit High School, his first coaching position. In 2005, he was hired as the special teams coordinator and linebackers coach for Rochester (NY). After one season he was promoted to head football coach, succeeding Mark Kreydt.

Greene announced his resignation from Rochester during the 2017 season, ending his tenure with an overall record of 50–64 including two bowl game appearances.

== Head coaching record ==
Year	Team	Overall	Conference	Standing	Bowl/playoffs
Rochester Yellowjackets (Liberty League) (2006–2017)
2006	Rochester	7–4	4–2	3rd	L Northwest Bowl
2007	Rochester	6–5	5–2	T–3rd	L Northwest Bowl
2008	Rochester	3–7	3–4	T–5th	
2009	Rochester	4–6	4–3	4th	
2010	Rochester	4–5	3–3	T–3rd	
2011	Rochester	4–5	3–3	T–3rd	
2012	Rochester	4–5	3–4	T–4th	
2013	Rochester	5–4	3–3	T–3rd	
2014	Rochester	5–4	3–4	T–4th	
2015	Rochester	5–4	3–4	5th	
2016	Rochester	1–8	0–7	8th	
2017	Rochester	2–7	0–5	6th	
Rochester:		50–64	34–43		
Total:		50–64			
