= Jehuu Caulcrick =

Liberian gridiron football player and coach (born 1983)

No. 30
- Position: Fullback

Personal information
- Born: 6 August 1983 (age 43); Liberia
- Listed height: 6 ft 0 in (1.83 m)
- Listed weight: 250 lb (113 kg)

Career information
- College: Michigan State
- NFL draft: 2008: undrafted

Career history
- New York Jets (2008–2009)*; Tampa Bay Buccaneers (2009)*; San Francisco 49ers (2010)*; Buffalo Bills (2010)
- * Offseason or practice squad member only

Awards and highlights
- Sporting News Freshman All-Big Ten (2004)

Career NFL statistics
- Rushing yards: 2
- Rushing average: 2.0
- Stats at Pro Football Reference

Jehuu Caulcrick (/ˈdʒeɪjuː ˈkɔːlkrɪk/; born 6 August 1983) is a Liberian coach of American football and former fullback. As a player, he was signed by the New York Jets as an undrafted free agent in 2008. He played college football at Michigan State. Caulcrick also played for the Tampa Bay Buccaneers, San Francisco 49ers and Buffalo Bills, and for nearly five years was a head coach at the high school football level.

== Early life ==
(Coming to America has been...) A new beginning for me. I had the opportunity to come here and start my life over.

— Jehuu Caulcrick

Caulcrick is the son of Bonita Karr and Jerome Blamo. He was born in Liberia. Living in Libera when civil war broke out, Caulcrick had seen his adopted brother killed and his grandfather shot in the leg while trying to protect his grandchildren. He also read in the newspaper about his father, a politician, being assassinated. In Liberia, he and his family went from refugee camp to refugee camp. Caulcrick witnessed much violence, and stated that they literally were stepping over dead bodies at times. Caulcrick stated that coming to America was "A new beginning for me. I had the opportunity to come here and start my life over". In an interview with ESPN First Take, Caulcrick stated that as a young child, he was always on the run due to his father's political career.

At the age of nine, Caulcrick moved to Findley Lake, New York with his mother and sister.

Caulcrick learned the game of American football while attending high school at Clymer Central School, one of the smallest high schools in Western New York, and the smallest football playing school in New York state. He wanted to play soccer, but they did not have a team so he went to football practice one day and was hooked from the start. He also participated in track & field, where he won Class title in the shot put.

Caulcrick played for Coach Howard McMullen at Clymer. Caulcrick led the team to four straight Section VI Class D championships and four consecutive appearances in the state final four, including an appearance in the state Class D championship game in 1999. He accumulated 100 career rushing TDs, and is the all-time rushing leader with 6,559 career yards. As a Junior, he gained 1,670 yards on 205 carries and scored 33 touchdowns. As a Senior, he was named Western New York Player of the Year after he rushed for 2,161 yards and 28 touchdowns. He was named Class D Player of the Year by the New York State Sportswriters Association, Player of the Year by The Buffalo News and The Post-Journal, and won the prestigious Connolly Cup award in 2002. He was a three-time all-state and All-Western New York selection. He was also named to PrepStar's All-Eastern Team. Going into college, Superprep rated him the second best fullback in the nation, and Rivals.com ranked him 5th best.

== College career ==
At Michigan State, he was moved to linebacker before being moved back to his high school position of tailback and part-time fullback due to his large size (255 pounds). He graduated with a major in sociology. He split game time with Javon Ringer.

Caulcrick was redshirted in 2003.

In 2004, as a Freshman, Caulcrick was named to the Big Ten All-Freshman Team by Sporting News. He finished with 619 yards on 113 carries (a 5.5 average).

In 2005, as a Sophomore, Caulcrick played in all 11 games. He rushed 89 times for 478 yards (5.4 avg.) and a team-leading seven touchdowns.

In 2006, as a Junior, Caulcrick played in 11 of 12 games, including six starts at running back. He finished with 426 yards on 108 carries (3.9 avg.), and again led the team in rushing touchdowns with 6.

Caulcrick was notably mentioned by sports talk radio personality Mike Valenti in a now-famous 18-minute on-air tirade following the 2006 Notre Dame-Michigan State game, which the Spartans lost 40-37 despite being ahead by 16 points at halftime. Caulcrick compiled 111 rushing yards on just 8 carries in the first half but, according to Valenti, was inexplicably benched during MSU's second-half collapse with teammate Javon Ringer receiving "exclusive carries".

This prompted Valenti to call for an explanation from then-offensive coordinator, Dave Baldwin, as to why Caulcrick was not seen in the second half.

In 2007, as a Senior he had 872 yards on 222 attempts and 21 touchdowns (a then MSU single season record) splitting time with Javon Ringer. Caulcrick was an honorable mention All-Big Ten selection by the media. He was also named one of four team captains by his teammates. He led the Big Ten and ranked 11th in the nation in scoring with 9.7 points per game. Caulcrick's 240 career points are seventh most in MSU history. He was a preseason honorable mention All-America selection by Street & Smith's. He was also named Big Ten Co-Offensive Player of the Week after scoring a career-high four touchdowns vs. UAB.

His 532 career rushing attempts rank 7th most in Spartan history. During his time at Michigan State, he totalled 2,395 career yards (4.5 avg.), ranking 10th all-time in MSU history. Caulcrick's 39 rushing Touchdowns are second-best in MSU History (4 behind Lorenzo White's record of 43).

Caulcrick has maintained a friendship with fellow MSU alumnus Ryan Miller, who coincidentally also would go on to play professional sport in Buffalo as the starting goaltender of the Buffalo Sabres.

=== Statistics ===
YEAR	ATT	YDS	AVG	LNG	TD
2004	113	619	5.5	59	5
2005	89	478	5.4	40	7
2006	108	426	3.9	30	6
2007	222	872	3.9	42	21
Total	532	2395	4.5	59	39

== Professional career ==
=== Pre-draft ===
Sports Illustrated listed Jehuu Caulcrick as a "bruising" runner. On NFLDraftscout.com, Caulcrick was rated 9 out of 98 fullbacks going into the NFL.

=== New York Jets ===
After going undrafted in the 2008 NFL draft, Caulcrick was signed as a free agent by the New York Jets. He was waived during final cuts on 30 August 2008 and subsequently re-signed to the team's practice squad. On 23 December 2008, he was waived from the practice squad. On 26 December 2008, he was re-signed to the practice squad, only to be waived again a day later.

Caulcrick was then re-signed to a future contract following the end of the 2008 season. He was released during final cuts on 5 September 2009 and re-signed to the practice squad a day later. However, Caulcrick was again released when the team re-signed Danny Woodhead to the practice squad.

=== Tampa Bay Buccaneers ===
Caulcrick was signed to the Tampa Bay Buccaneers' practice squad on 29 December 2009.

=== San Francisco 49ers ===
After his contract with the Buccaneers expired at season's end, Caulcrick was signed to a future contract by the San Francisco 49ers on 12 January 2010.

Caulcrick spent the first few weeks of the 2010 NFL season on the 49ers' practice squad before being released on 12 October.

On 20 October, the 49ers re-signed Caulcrick to the practice squad.

=== Buffalo Bills ===
On 20 November 2010, the Buffalo Bills called Caulcrick up from the practice squad. For him to make the 53 man roster, the Bills released WR Paul Hubbard. Caulcrick was the second fullback on the Bills roster, along with veteran Corey McIntyre. On 3 September 2011, he was cut by the Bills.

== Post-playing career ==
After his time with the Bills, Caulcrick retired from professional football. Caulcrick, now resides in Warren, Michigan and works as an executive for Crossfire, which is a recruiting firm in southeast Michigan. He spent the 2012 season as an assistant coach for the Westfield/Brocton High Schools high school football team. He became head coach of Southwestern Central High School's football team prior to the 2015 season, serving in that position for 4¾ seasons until he accepted a position with the NFL, working to test the safety of player equipment, in October 2019. The position requires him to relocate to Detroit, Michigan. Caulcrick's overall record at Southwestern was 31–11.

As of 2023, Caulcrick works as a sideline reporter for the Michigan State Spartans football broadcasts and as color commentator for the modern Michigan Panthers of the USFL, both on WJR.

Preceded by Jaren Hayes	Michigan State Spartans; Starting Running Back; 2004–2007	Succeeded by Javon Ringer
