= B. J. Cunningham =

American football player (born 1989)

B.J. Cunningham
No. 89
- Position: Wide receiver

Personal information
- Born: May 29, 1989 (age 37); Westerville, Ohio, U.S.
- Listed height: 6 ft 1 in (1.85 m)
- Listed weight: 211 lb (96 kg)

Career information
- High school: Westerville South
- College: Michigan State
- NFL draft: 2012: 6th round, 183rd overall pick

Career history
- Miami Dolphins (2012)*; Philadelphia Eagles (2012−2013); Chicago Bears (2014)*; Montreal Alouettes (2015–2021); Ottawa Redblacks (2022)*
- * Offseason or practice squad member only

Awards and highlights
- Second-team All-Big Ten (2011)

Career CFL statistics
- Receptions: 180
- Receiving yards: 2,574
- Receiving touchdowns: 14
- Stats at CFL.ca
- Stats at Pro Football Reference

Bryan Cunningham, Jr. (born May 29, 1989) is an American former professional football player who was a wide receiver in the National Football League (NFL) and Canadian Football League (CFL). He played college football for the Michigan State Spartans. He was selected in the sixth round at the 183rd overall pick in the 2012 NFL draft by the Miami Dolphins. He was also a member of the Philadelphia Eagles, Chicago Bears, Montreal Alouettes and Ottawa Redblacks.

== Early life ==
Cunningham attended Westerville South High School in Westerville, Ohio. As a senior, he had 45 receptions for 770 yards and nine touchdowns.

== College career ==
Cunningham concluded his career at Michigan State as the school's all-time leader in receptions (218) and receiving yards (3,086). He also ranks second in career TD receptions with 25.

== Professional career ==
=== Miami Dolphins ===
He was selected in the sixth round of the 2012 NFL draft by the Miami Dolphins. On May 17 of that year, Cunningham signed a four-year $2.2 million contract; includes a $106,000 signing bonus. Cunningham was, however, cut by the Dolphins on August 31, 2012.

=== Philadelphia Eagles ===
Cunningham was signed to the Philadelphia Eagles practice squad on September 1, 2012. On August 1, 2013, Cunningham was waived with an injury settlement by the Philadelphia Eagles. On October 14, 2013, Cunningham was re-signed to the Eagles' active roster. He was released on November 12, 2013. Two days later, he was signed to Eagles' practice squad.

=== Chicago Bears ===
Cunningham was signed to the Chicago Bears practice squad on November 12, 2014.

=== Montreal Alouettes ===
Cunningham was signed by the Montreal Alouettes on July 28, 2015. After a modest 2015 season Cunningham had a breakout 2016 campaign, playing in 17 regular season games catching 65 passes for 855 yards with 4 touchdowns. The following season, in 2017, he had the best season of his career, catching 69 passes for 1,128 yards with 4 touchdowns. Cunningham missed four games in the 2018 season but was still a significant contributor to the Alouettes' passing attack. In February 2019, Cunningham signed a contract extension with Montreal. In August 2019, Cunningham suffered a fractured wrist and played in just six games. He signed a one-year contract extension with the Alouettes on January 25, 2021. For the 2021 season, Cunningham played in nine games where he had 36 receptions for 474 yards and one touchdown. He became a free agent upon the expiry of his contract on February 8, 2022.

=== Ottawa Redblacks ===
On February 10, 2022, it was announced that Cunningham had signed with the Ottawa Redblacks. Cunningham was released as part of the team's final roster cuts on June 4, 2022.
