= Javon Ringer =

American football player (born 1987)

Michigan State Spartans
- Title: Recruiting assistant

Personal information
- Born: February 2, 1987 (age 39); Dayton, Ohio, U.S.
- Listed height: 5 ft 9 in (1.75 m)
- Listed weight: 213 lb (97 kg)

Career information
- High school: Chaminade-Julienne (Dayton)
- College: Michigan State (2005–2008)
- NFL draft: 2009: 5th round, 173rd overall pick

Career history

Playing
- Tennessee Titans (2009–2012)

Coaching
- Michigan State (2016) Recruiting intern; Toledo (2017) Quality control; Toledo (2018–2022) Assistant director of football operations; Michigan State (2023–present) Recruiting assistant

Awards and highlights
- Consensus All-American (2008); First-team All-Big Ten (2008); Second-team All-Big Ten (2007); Michigan State Hall of Fame (2023)

Career NFL statistics
- Rushing attempts: 120
- Rushing yards: 486
- Rushing touchdowns: 3
- Receptions: 38
- Receiving yards: 243
- Stats at Pro Football Reference

Javon Eugene Ringer (born February 2, 1987) is an American former professional football player who was a running back for the Tennessee Titans of the National Football League (NFL). He played college football for the Michigan State Spartans, earning consensus All-American honors in 2008. He was selected in the fifth round of the 2009 NFL draft.

Ringer attended Chaminade Julienne High School where he set school and state records. In college, he achieved many awards. In 2005, he earned honorable mention Freshman All-America status from The Sporting News. He was also named to The Sporting News Big Ten All-Freshman Team. In 2006, he earned the Biggie Munn Award, an award given to the team's most inspirational player. In 2007, he had a breakout season, becoming Michigan State's first 1,000 yard carrier since T. J. Duckett in 2001. He was also named Second Team All-Big Ten in the coaches and media polls. In 2008, as a senior, he was one of four team captains. He was a semi-finalist for the Maxwell Award, the Walter Camp Award, and was a finalist for the Doak Walker Award, which he finished in third, behind Shonn Greene and Knowshon Moreno. He was also a Heisman Trophy candidate at one point, the only running back to be officially nominated all year.

He had a minor knee injury during the end of the 2008 season, which led to corrective surgery. This slowed his Combine numbers; however, he improved upon them during MSU's Pro Days. He was one of three Spartans invited to the NFL combine. ESPN.com ranked him the 8th best running back in the draft. He was a projected third rounder in the 2009 NFL draft. Another site listed him as a mid-second round draft choice. His performance at the MSU Pro Day "absolutely blew NFL teams away", due to putting up impressive numbers while not fully recovered. After being drafted by Tennessee in the fifth round, Ringer battled several running backs for the third string position coming into his rookie 2009 season, a battle he won. He made his NFL debut in week 1, as a kick returner, and overall has played in 7 games. He was benched as kick returner after a poor performance in week 2. He had his first NFL carries in a week 6 game against the New England Patriots. Ringer's NFL career was marred by injuries, having missed 27 games in 4 years. Since retiring from the NFL, Ringer has worked with his alum Michigan State as an assistant coach.

== Personal ==
Ringer is the son of Bishop Eugene and Darlene Ringer, who are both ministers. Ringer is a devout Christian. He owns a black belt in Karate. He majored in sociology.

Ringer graduated from Michigan State University in May 2015.

== Football career ==
=== High school ===
Ringer attended and graduated from Chaminade Julienne Catholic High School (the same high school former Spartan nose guard Brandon McKinney attended) where Ringer is the all-time leading rusher. He was coached by Jim Place. In 33 games, he totalled 6,184 rushing yards and 81 TDs, an average of 187.9 yard per game and 2.45 touchdowns per game. Ringer wore #29 during high school. Ringer also lettered in track, producing a personal best 10.6s in the 100-meter dash.

In 2001, as a freshman, Ringer was on the football team, but did not register an offensive stat.

In 2002, as a sophomore, Ringer was named the team's starter. He help lead his team to a 14–1 record and the Ohio D-II State Championship, which was the school's first state championship in football. He totaled 2,038 yards and scored 30 rushing TDs that year. In the state championship game, he broke records for both rushing touchdowns (4) and rushing yards in a D-II championship game (251).

External media

Images
- a 15-year-old Ringer during a High School game- Sophomore year (2002)

Video
- Javon Ringer High school highlight video

In 2003, as a junior, he rushed for 2,356 yards and scored 30 rushing touchdowns, including a 307 yard, 3 TD game against McNicholas.

In 2004, as a senior, he participated in the Big 33 Football Classic, which features the top high school football players in Pennsylvania against the top high school football players in Ohio. He rushed for 1,790 yards and 21 touchdowns in seven games. His career best game was against Purcell Marian High School, where he had 372 rushing yards and scored five TDs. Later that year, Ringer tore his ACL, which kept him out the final six games of the season, and his 'shaky grades' plus a low ACT score took him off the map to attend Ohio State University. Scouts.com had him listed as the 18th best high school running back.

His measurables during his senior year were: Weight: 186 lbs, Forty time: 4.44 secs, Bench max: 325 pounds, Bench reps: 20, Vertical: 36 inches, and Shuttle: 3.87 secs. SuperPrep ranked him the 29th best back, Collegefootballnews.com ranked him 31st, while Detroit Free Press ranked him the 18th best prospect in the Midwest. Rivals.com listed him as the 13th best senior in the state of Ohio. Superprep named him the 25th best Prospect in the Midwest, while Prep Football report ranked him 37th. Max Emfinger ranked him the 4th best all-purpose back in the country. in 2004, Ringer attend the NIKE Camp in Columbus, OH in April and had a very impressive workout

He received scholarship offers from Michigan State, USC, Tennessee, Florida, and Iowa. Ringer was also heavily recruited by Ohio State, but did not receive a scholarship offer from the school. Ohio State coach Jim Tressel said “(We) were very interested. We thought he was a great player.” One article said the reason why Ringer wasn't given an offer is because OSU compared Ringer to Ryan Brewer, a high school standout from Troy, Ohio who OSU passed on. Brewer had a solid college career at South Carolina for Coach Lou Holtz and helped the Gamecocks beat Ohio State in the 2001 Outback Bowl. Ringer attended summer football camps at Ohio State during high school. One of them was 2004's NIKE Camp in Columbus, Ohio. During that camp, Ringer had a camp best shuttle run of a 3.87 seconds. He also had the best vertical leap that day with a jump of 37 inches (940 mm). He also attended a camp at the University of Michigan.

=== College ===
Coming out of high school, Ringer was a prized recruit for the Spartans, choosing Michigan State over Tennessee and Florida, among other schools. Ringer visited MSU on December 14, 2004, where and during the visit, he committed to the school. In his career at Michigan State, Ringer was very successful. Ringer rushed for 4398 yards in his career at Michigan State, with a 4.1 yards per carry average. Notre Dame head coach Charlie Weis has described Ringer's abilities by saying, "You can hit him and hit him and hit him and he just keeps on coming."

You can hit him and hit him and hit him and he just keeps on coming.

— Charlie Weis,

Ringer's college numbers are similar to those of Emmitt Smith, Thurman Thomas, Brian Westbrook and Frank Gore. In 2010, Ringer was named an honorable mention, along with another Michigan State player Charles Rogers, in ESPN's "Big Ten players of the decade".

In 2005, as a Freshman, Ringer earned honorable mention Freshman All-America status from The Sporting News. He was also named to The Sporting News Big Ten All-Freshman Team. He finished with 122 carries for 817 yards, the second-best single-season rushing total by a True freshman in MSU history.

In 2006, as a sophomore, Ringer earned the Biggie Munn Award given to the team's most inspirational player. In eight games (including five starts), he led the Spartans in rushing with 86 carries for 497 yards, despite missing five games with a knee injury. Then-Spartans coach John L. Smith said of Ringer, "Javon Ringer is a special player and a special young man. He has incredible heart and courage. After suffering what appeared to be a season-ending knee injury, Javon willed himself back onto the playing field. He worked his tail off, so he could go to the field and compete with his teammates."

After his sophomore year, Ringer changed his number from 39 to 23.

As a junior, in 2007, Ringer had a breakout season, rushing for 1,447 yards on 245 carries with a 5.9 average, becoming Michigan State's first 1,000 yard carrier since T. J. Duckett in 2001. In addition, he was named Second Team All-Big Ten in the coaches and media polls.

==== 2008 season ====
In April 2008, NFL draft expert Mel Kiper Jr. named Ringer as his choice as the best back in the class of 2009. Going into 2008, Ringer ranked 6th all time on MSU's rushing list with 3,259 yards. Also, his 596 carries is 7th in school history. He also was seventh on MSU's all purpose yardage list with 4,311.

In 2008, as a senior, Ringer was mentioned on several Heisman Trophy watch lists. He was nominated for three national awards: the Maxwell Award (given to the College football Player of the Year), Walter Camp Award, and the Doak Walker Award (nation's top running back). He was a preseason third-team All-American and first-team All-Big Ten selection by Phil Steele's College Football Preview, where he was rated 6th among the nation's top running backs. The Chicago Tribune calls Ringer a "Brusing Runner", a title former teammate Jehuu Caulcrick also acquired. Ringer was also named as one of four team captains Ringer also had never carried the ball more than thirty times in a game before the 2008 season, a mark he exceeded multiple times in 2008.

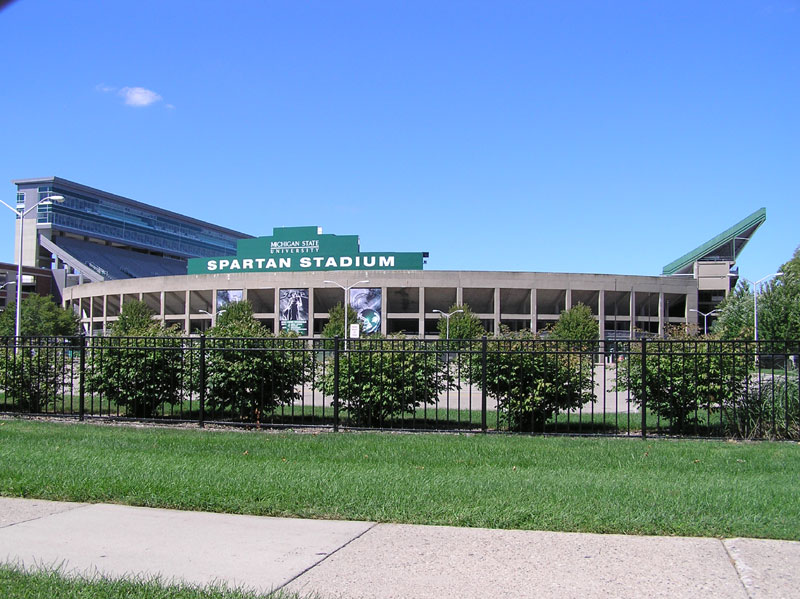
Spartan Stadium, where Ringer played home games during his College football career

On August 30, against California, Ringer had 200 all-purpose yards, including a career-best 102 yards on kickoff returns, he had 81 yards on the ground on 27 attempts with two touchdowns. On September 6, against Eastern Michigan University, Ringer was named Big Ten Tri-Player of the Week after scoring a career-high five touchdowns, with 205 all-purpose yards. He rushed for 135 yards on a 34 carries. On September 13, 2008, against Florida Atlantic University, Ringer was named Big Ten Offensive Player of the Week for the second week in a row, when he rushed for 282 yards on 43 carries, with a 6.6 average, scoring 2 touchdowns. His rushing yardage and number of carries were career highs at the time. In that game, he had 309 all-purpose yards, which is 2nd all time in MSU History. On September 20, against Notre Dame, Ringer had 39 carries for 201 yards, including two touchdowns. His performance made him the first player to earn the Big Ten Offensive Player of the week award for the three consecutive weeks. On September 27, against Indiana, Ringer had a career-high 44 carries for 198 yards and one touchdown

I think he's very good and very blessed to be operating behind those five guys. That's the big problem, having to sort through those five big guys to find where he is. When they all come off at one time they look like a herd of water buffalo stampeding at you and there's a gazelle somewhere in behind them. He's also very persistent and you can see how strong he is.

— Florida Atlantic head coach Howard Schnellenberger

On October 5, against Iowa, Ringer had a then season-low 25 carries for 91 yards and no touchdowns. After this win, Michigan State entered the national rankings at #23 On October 11, against Northwestern, Ringer had 124 yards on 35 with 2 touchdowns. Ringer now had 1,112 yards, becoming the first Spartan with back-to-back 1,000 yard seasons since T. J. Duckett did it in 2000–2001. After this game, Michigan State had a record of 6–1, their best start since 2003. On October 16, Michigan State created a website dedicated to Ringer. Two days later, in a 45–7 loss against a tough OSU run defense, Ringer had a then season low 16 carries for only 67 yards. On October 25, against the Michigan, Ringer had 37 carries for 194 yards and two touchdowns, leading the Spartans to their first victory at Michigan since 1990 and snapping a six-game losing streak against their rivals.

On November 1, against Wisconsin, Ringer, who was slowed by a stomach virus, had 21 carries for a then season low 54 yards, with 2 rushing touchdowns. On November 8, against Purdue, Ringer had 32 carries for 121 yards (a 3.8 average) with 2 touchdowns. Purdue coach Joe Tiller said of Ringer after the game, "I don't know if he gets stronger or if the opponent just begins to wear down. But he's had multiple games where he's broken big plays in the second half. That tells me this guy is great from an endurance point of view." On November 22, against Penn State, Ringer had a season low 17 carries for a season low 42 yards. Penn State had the nation's 10th best rushing defense at the time.

Ringer's final game was against Georgia in the 2009 Capital One Bowl on January 1, 2009, in which he had 20 carries for 47 total yards and 1 touchdown, the game was supposed to be a "showdown" between Ringer and Georgia RB Knowshon Moreno, but both players combined for only 43 carries and 109 yards, with Ringer scoring the only touchdown. Ringer's numbers on the year set MSU single-season records for touchdowns and points scored. Ringer finished 2nd all time in MSU history (behind Lorenzo White) as leading rusher. Ringer is MSU's all-time leader in all-purpose yards (5,349). His 823 career carries lead all-active FBS players and he ranks third in MSU history; his 4,351 career yards were first among active players on BCS teams.

Ringer was as high as second in the ESPN EXPERTS Heisman poll, but at one point dropped off of the list after two games with less than 100 yards rushing. After a good game against University of Michigan, he re-entered the Heisman poll and finished the season ranked 8th. The ESPN Fan poll ranked him third in Heisman voting, with over 10 percent of the votes Ringer was the only running back nominated for Heisman.

Ringer was named a first-team Midseason All-American by Sporting News Today, SI.com, CBSSports.com, CollegeFootballNews.com, Rivals.com, and Phil Steele. He was also named a semifinalist for the Doak Walker Award, the Maxwell Award, and the Walter Camp Player of the Year award. He finished third for the Doak Walker Award behind Shonn Greene and Knowshon Moreno. Ringer finished seventh in College Football News Top 10 Player Race (for national player of the year). He was also named an Associated Press First-Team All-American. He was also a candidate for Big Ten Player of the Year. Ringer finished his 2008 season leading the nation in rushing attempts (370), coming in second in total rushing yards (1590), first in rushing touchdowns (21). He also finished third in the nation in yards per game (132.5) and all-purpose yardage (1974). He averaged more than 30 carries a game and had 92 more carries than anyone else in college football. His 44 carries against Indiana were the most by any college football player in a single game in 2008.

He graduated in 2009 with a Sociology major.

==== Statistics ====
===== Final 2008 national rankings =====
2008 national stats
Category	National rank
Scoring	1st
Rushing yards	4th
Carries	1st
Touchdowns	1st

===== Overall stats =====
Overall college stats
Year	Attempts	Yards	Average	Long	Rush TD	Games Played
2005	122	817	6.7	59	5	11
2006	86	497	5.71	1	8	
2007	245	1447	5.9	80	6	12
2008	390	1637	4.1	64	22	13
Total	843	4398	5.4	64	34	44

==== Rankings ====
Ringer finished his career at Michigan state with the following rankings:

===== MSU all-time records =====
MSU all-time records
	Stat	Ranking
MSU rushing yardage	4389	2nd
Carries	843	2nd
Rushing touchdowns	34	tied 4th
All-purpose yards	5426	1st
100-yard rushing games	19	2nd
200-yard rushing games	3	Tied 3rd

===== MSU season records =====
MSU season records
	Stat	Year	Ranking
Rushing yards	1637	2008	2nd
Rushing yards	1447	2007	6th
Carries	390	2008	2nd
Total touchdowns	22	2008	1st
Points scored	132	2008	1st
All-Purpose yards	2051	2008	3rd

===== Big Ten all-time records =====
Big Ten All-Time Records
	Stat	Ranking
Rushing yards	4398	10th

===== Big Ten season records =====
Big Ten Season records
	Stat	Year	Rank
Carries	290	2009	2nd

===== Career highs =====
Career highs
	Number	Date	Opponent
Carries	44	09/27/08	Indiana
Rushing yards	282	09/13/08	Florida Atlantic
Rushing TDs	5	09/06/08	Eastern Michigan
TD run	80	10/06/07	Northwestern
Catches	7	09/29/07	Wisconsin
Receiving yards	88	09/29/07	Wisconsin
All-Purpose yards	209	09/13/08	Florida Atlantic
Kickoff return	102	08/30/08	Cal

=== Professional career ===
==== Pre-draft ====
In April 2008, NFL draft expert Mel Kiper Jr. named Ringer as the best back in the class of 2009. However, when Mel Kiper revised his 2009 draft choices in February 2009, Ringer was not listed among Kiper's top five running backs. It was revealed Ringer has been playing on a torn lateral meniscus, which he had surgery on six days after the season ended. Ringer has said he has worked out at the combine with his knee at "80%". Ringer skipped the 2009 Senior Bowl because of his injury.

I'll go anywhere. To get picked up somewhere will be a blessing.

— Javon Ringer

Despite the injury, Ringer chose to participate in the 40-yard dash at the NFL combine. He clocked in at 4.59. Ringer was quoted as saying "I personally was disappointed because I know I'm a lot faster than that. But I was able to do that just coming off knee surgery, so if I look at it that way, I'm happy." He finished third among running backs in the 20-yard shuttle (4.11 seconds) and fifth in the three-cone drill (6.87 seconds). During the combine, Ringer said he interviewed with 12 teams. ESPN.com ranked him as the 8th best running back in the draft. When Scouts Inc. graded Ringer, they gave him a 1 (Exceptional) in Character. They said of Ringer, "No off-the-field issues we are aware of. Coaches and teammates have only positive things to say about him. Outstanding intangibles." Ringer was a projected third-round pick by walterfootball.com. Another site lists him as a mid-second round draft choice. A Dayton Daily News article states that Ringer is "Still projected as a 2nd-rounder", despite the injury. The same article stated that Ringer interviewed with the Cleveland Browns and Cincinnati Bengals at the NFL combine.

Pre-draft measurables
Height	Weight	Arm length	Hand span	40-yard dash	10-yard split	20-yard split	20-yard shuttle	Three-cone drill	Vertical jump	Broad jump	Bench press
5 ft 9 1/8 in (1.76 m)	205 lb (93 kg)	30 3/4 in (0.78 m)	9 5/8 in (0.24 m)	4.50 s	1.50 s	2.58 s	3.89 s	6.66 s	34 in (0.86 m)	9 ft 7 in (2.92 m)	23 reps
All values from NFL Combine/Pro Day

Ringer was one of three MSU players to be invited to the NFL Combine, along with QB Brian Hoyer and safety Otis Wiley.

External media

Images
- Ringer during MSU's pro day- March 18, 2009

Video
- Mel Kiper, Jr. Discusses the running backs in the 2009 draft

Ringer took part in Michigan State's 2009 NFL Pro Day at the Duffy Daugherty indoor facility. Ringer's shuttle time was 3.89, which was faster than the fastest time at the NFL combine. Ringer said of the workout, "I think I did pretty well, especially coming back from my knee injury. I'm still not 100 percent, probably around 85 or 90. This is basically another big stepping stone from what I did at the combine. Now that I was able to do some training, I felt like my change of direction was superb. I feel like I did really well in the shuttle and in the three-cone drill." Ringer improved his forty time from a 4.59 at the combine to a 4.42 during Pro Days. When asked about where he wants to get drafted, Ringer responded, "I'll go anywhere. To get picked up somewhere will be a blessing." Ringer's performance at Pro Day "absolutely blew NFL teams away", due to putting up impressive numbers while not fully recovered. With his draft stock on the rise, Ringer has worked out with several NFL teams, including the Denver Broncos, the Tennessee Titans and the San Diego Chargers. He has also drawn interest from the Seattle Seahawks. He has since received workouts from the Tampa Bay Buccaneers, the Buffalo Bills, and the New York Jets. A website that predicts him as a 3rd to 4th rounder also compares him to Priest Holmes. Ringer stated about his knee right before the draft, "My leg feels fine. Right now, I'll give it between 90 and 95%." One site calls Ringer a "willing, if undersized, workhorse", but also questions his durability. Mel Kiper said of Ringer "He's only 5–9, 205, but he's remarkably strong, a good athlete and just a tough kid with great character. He blocks extremely well, and he'll be a very serviceable No. 2 back. He'll probably end up being a fourth- or fifth-round pick." Ringer spent time with his family in Dayton, Ohio, on April 25 watching the draft and celebrating his mother's birthday, waiting to get selected.

==== Tennessee Titans ====
===== 2009 =====
Ringer was selected by the Tennessee Titans in the fifth round of the 2009 NFL Draft, 173rd overall, and the 11th running back taken overall. At the time of being drafted, he was one of eight running backs on the Titans' roster. Terry McCormick of the Nashville City Paper, when grading the Titans' draft, gave the Ringer pick an "A".

External media

Images
- Ringer during rookie minicamp

Video
- Video of Ringer during minicamp

He was the only MSU player drafted in 2009. Ringer said of his future pro career, "I definitely have something to prove with me showing that I am just as good, if not better, than a lot of the running backs that went above me. I don't want to be one of those running backs who is titled as, He was a good running back in college and went to the NFL and became a bust. I want to make sure I continue to be called a great running back also in the NFL." Ringer was expected to play special teams and operate as a third-down back. Because 23 was taken by Donnie Nickey, Ringer was assigned #3, a number normally prohibited for use by running backs. He kept the number until early August, when he switched to number 21.

====== Mini-camp and OTAs ======
Ringer participated in his first organized team activities in May 2009. When talking about rookie camp, he said "Ability-wise, I feel like I am good with competing. Strength, speed and quickness, I feel like I am OK. It's just the plays are a lot more complicated than college, and I am trying to get used to it. I just need some more time. We all just need time. But the veterans have been helpful." Ringer and the Titans agreed to a multi-year contract on July 21, 2009. His base salary was expected to be $310,000. The Titans' running backs coach Earnest Byner said of Ringer, “Bringing in Javon has definitely added to the mix because, right away, guys know he's something to reckon with because they see what he's done out here."

====== Training camp ======
Ringer participated in the Titans' training camp in Clarksville and Nashville, Tennessee, which started July 25.

External image
- Ringer carrying the ball during training camp

Titans head coach Jeff Fisher said of Ringer "He's got great run skills and he's in good shape, He's got a sense and a knack for pushing the ball north and south. Again we just finished the first day in pads, and he's probably had 10 reps, so we still have some time." Ringer also said "I am definitely doing a lot of watching, Different things that they do is the reason why they're successful in the NFL, so I am kind of watching and learning and seeing how they go about their business. ... I am asking questions and they've been very helpful with me."

Titans running backs coach Earnest Byner said of Ringer "You can see the running skills, the things that we saw when we watched him at Michigan State, Good patience, good body lean, the ability to set the inside zones, acceleration, vision. Can he go in and compete on offense? Yes he can. With the way things are progressing, with the competition ... that competition is going to make that third position much better." Ringer commented on the role, saying "Special teams can help you win or lose a game. My goal coming in here was to be a productive player anyway possible. If special teams is it then that will be it. I know that's going to be a big deal. I know I'll get my chance sooner or later.”

Ringer was the favorite for the 3rd string running back role, which he won.

====== Preseason ======
The Titans were the first NFL team to play a preseason game, in the Pro Football Hall of Fame Game on August 9, 2009. Ringer played his NFL debut there. Ringer discussed the game earlier, saying, "I am very excited. I have never even been to an NFL game as a fan, so my first experience I am going to be playing in one, I am looking forward to it." Ringer had four carries for 14 yards, along with two catches for nine yards, while the Titans won 21–18. On August 15, in a preseason game against the Tampa Bay Buccaneers, Ringer lead the team in rushing with seven attempts for 51 yards, including a 36-yard touchdown run. The Titans won 27–20.

External media

Images
- Ringer's first preseason touchdown run

Video
- Video of the Run

In a 10–30 loss against the Dallas Cowboys, the first game in Cowboys Stadium, Ringer again led the team in rushing, this time with 33 yards on 5 attempts. He had what would have been a 17-yard touchdown run called back due to a penalty. He also had 2 catches for 6 yards, and averaged 34 yards on two kickoff return.

He's a character guy, and you could tell that from the start, He's the total package. You rarely get that combination of humility and natural athletic ability and I think he has that great combination. You combine those two and you get someone who could be unstoppable.

— Fullback Ahmard Hall

Ringer said after the game, referring to being drafted late "I think a lot of people thought I had a lot of wear and tear on me, too much, so they didn't know how much I have left, I just kind of laughed it off. I still feel good, and I think because of all that I'll never be complacent. I feel like I want to prove myself even more, and prove a lot of people wrong. Everything happens for a reason, though." Titans quarterback Kerry Collins said of Ringer "He is a good football player. Some guys are just football players, and Javon Ringer is a football player. He is patient, remarkably patient for a rookie running back. He sees blocking schemes well and has a good feel for when to cut back and when not to cut back. He has shown a lot of moves. I think the kid has a bright future.” Titans linebacker Keith Bulluck also said “He has an understanding of the game, you can tell by the cuts he makes at times. The way he runs, and the way that he pays attention. You don't see the coaches get on him much for messing up, so that's big for a rookie. I've been impressed.’’ Tackle Michael Roos also added in, “He sees the block in progress, He can tell when a block is going to be made and he trusts that it will be made, so sometimes he is cutting before the block has even been made. You don't see that a lot. A few people have that, and he has definitely got it. Hopefully he can get reps with the (first team) a little more and see where it goes from there.’’

Jim Wyatt, of The Tennessean, reported that Ringer was the favorite for the third-string job, and almost a lock to make the roster. Fullback Ahmard Hall said "He's a character guy, and you could tell that from the start, He's the total package. You rarely get that combination of humility and natural athletic ability and I think he has that great combination. You combine those two and you get someone who could be unstoppable." Of all the praise, Ringer responded, "I have to give credit to how I was brought up. I grew up in a religious family and I know without God none of this would be possible for me anyway, so that definitely keeps me humble. My personality is not to boast and brag about the accomplishments and things I am trying to do. Actions speak louder than words and that is what I try and strive for." In a 17–23 loss to the Cleveland Browns, Ringer only had one run for two yards. Ringer finished off the pre-season with a 7 carry 18 yard performance, in a 27–13 win over the Green Bay Packers.

Ringer finished the pre-season with 24 carries for 118 yards, with one touchdown and four catches for 15 yards, ranking 27th among all NFL running backs for the preseason.

====== Regular season ======
The Titans were also the first team to play in the regular season, when they played the Steelers on September 10. Ringer was used to return kicks. In the 10–13 overtime loss, Ringer had 3 Kick Returns, a 19 yard average, including a long of 21 yards. He also played on special teams, and had one tackle. Ringer was again used as a kick returner, this time in a 31–34 loss to the Houston Texans. Ringer had 6 returns for a 20 yard average, with a long of 25, and no touchdowns. He also played on special teams, but had no tackles. In a 17–24 week 3 loss to the New York Jets, Ringer was benched as the kick returner, and, while active, did not play in the game. Ringer's kick return replacement, Ryan Mouton, had two fumbles during returns. Despite this, Titan's coach Jeff Fischer stood behind his decision to bench Ringer. In a 37–17 loss to the Jacksonville Jaguars, Ringer was again active, but only played as a reserve on special teams. Ringer was one of three Titans who did not register a stat. The Titans, who last year had 13 wins, only three losses, started the season out zero wins four losses. They had their fifth loss of the season in a 31–9 loss to the Colts, a game in which Ringer was once again active, but only played special teams, not registering a stat. Ringer was one of two Titans that did not record an offensive stat. In a record-breaking 59–0 loss to the New England Patriots, Ringer had his first NFL carries, having 7 carries for 47 yards (6.7 average), including a 32 yard run, for no touchdowns, all amounting in Garbage time. The Titans finished the game with negative seven passing yards as their record moved to 0 wins and 6 losses. Despite his performance in the loss, head coach Jeff Fisher said that Chris Johnson and LenDale White will continue to get the majority of the carries. "There's not enough balls to go around. I wouldn't hesitate to put Ringer in if there's an issue," Fisher said. During a practice on October 28, 2009, Ringer injured his back and had to be carted off in an ambulance. Fisher said of the injury "It could be any number of things and it would be unfair for me to speculate right now. He is obviously in some pain." The call to the hospital was initially phoned to treat a potentially "traumatic" injury, but tests have revealed that the injury is "not considered serious". After spending a night with back problems, Ringer was released from the hospital early morning on October 29. Ringer was expected to miss a few weeks, as he was listed on the injury report with a back injury. Fisher commented on the injury, "We got some good news on Javon. He obviously didn't practice today, but he's going to be OK. We were really concerned about it. We feared the worst and we got good results," but would not elaborate as to the full extent of the injury. In a 30–13 victory over the Jacksonville Jaguars, Ringer was declared inactive before the game, and did not play. It was however, the Titans first victory of the season. In week 9, Ringer was again inactive and did not play. In week 10, Ringer was listed as questionable, but was declared inactive, and did not play. In a 20–17 win against the Houston Texans, Ringer was inactive, and did not play. In 20–17 win against the Arizona Cardinals, Ringer was listed as the #2 running back. He had one yard on one carry. Ringer played because LenDale White, the team's usual #2 Running back, was benched due to being late to a team meeting. Ringer was then inactive for the rest of the season. Ringer finished the season with eight attempts for 48 yards, playing in 7 games. The Titans were eliminated from playoff contention with a week 16 loss to the San Diego Chargers.

===== 2010 =====
During the 2010 NFL draft, backup running back LenDale White was traded to the Seattle Seahawks. Despite the team signing Stafon Johnson and LeGarrette Blount as undrafted free agents, head coach Jeff Fisher confirmed that Ringer would be the new backup running back, stating "We have a terrific running back [in Chris Johnson], and a very talented backup in Javon." When Chris Johnson held out of training camp, Ringer took the first-string role. When discussing the backup running back role, offensive coordinator, Mike Heimerdinger said, "[Ringer's] been really good in training camp. I have a lot of confidence in Javon, with everything he has shown. He has the ability to make some runs... There's no reason why he can't be that guy." During the first pre-season game of the 2010 season, Ringer led the team in rushing yards (60 yards, seven carries). Fullback Ahmad Hall said of Ringer "Everybody knew he was a great back last year... He really, really immersed himself in the playbook, and picked everything up. If anything happened to C.J. he could definitely fill in and execute well. He is a smart guy, and he applies himself. The guy is a good running back."

Ringer finished the season with 329 yards on 51 carries, including two touchdowns, playing in all 16 games.

===== 2011 =====
In the 2011 season, Ringer played in 12 games, rushing for 185 yards on 59 attempts and one touchdown. He was primarily used as a receiving back, catching 28 passes for 187 yards. He also worked on special teams. In week 14, Ringer broke his hand, resulting in him being placed on injured reserve after surgery.

===== 2012 =====
In 2012 season, Ringer missed several weeks with lingering injuries, including an infection in his arm that doctors told him could have led to amputation had it not been treated quickly. In week 5, Ringer tore his MCL, causing him to miss the remainder of the season being placed on injured reserve. The injury occurred late in the 4th quarter of a game between the Titans and the Minnesota Vikings After only playing two games in 2012, Ringer's contract expired at the end of the season and he became a free-agent. He was not signed by a team since. Ringer missed 27 games in his four seasons due to injury.

==== Comeback attempt ====
Ringer had knee surgery in February 2013 to fix the injury he had. During the 2013 season, Ringer drew interest from the Miami Dolphins, but was ultimately not signed.

After spending a year out of football to rehab his knee injury, Ringer attempted to comeback to the sport in 2014. He participated at the MSU Pro Day and ran a 4.61 40-yard dash. The Pro Day results got him a workout with the Chicago Bears, who declined to sign him.

== Coaching career ==
In 2016, Michigan State hired Ringer as a recruiting intern for the football team.

== Awards and honors ==
=== High school ===
- 3x all-conference Selection (2004, 2003, 2002)
- 3x All-Ohio Selection (2004, 2003, 2002)
- 4th in Mr. Football voting (2004)

=== College ===
- Sporting News Honorable mention Freshman All-American (2005)
- Sporting News Big Ten All-Freshman Team (2005)
- Biggie Munn Award (2006)
- Big Ten Player of the Week (Week 5, 2007)
- Second Team All-Big Ten (2007)
- Michigan State team MVP (2007)
- Outstanding Underclass Back Award (2007)
- Clarence J. Underwood Jr. Sportsmanship Award (2007)
- College Football Preview Preseason third-team All-American (2008)
- College Football Preview Preseason first-team All-Big Ten (2008)
- Big Ten Offensive Player of the Week (Week 1, 2008)
- Big Ten Offensive Player of the Week (Week 2, 2008)
- Big Ten Tri-Player of the Week (Week 3, 2008)
- Sporting News First-team Midseason All-American (2008)
- SI.com First-team Midseason All-American (2008)
- CBSSports.com First-team Midseason All-American (2008)
- CollegeFootballNews.com First-team Midseason All-American (2008)
- Rivals.com First-team Midseason All-American (2008)
- Phil Steele First-team Midseason All-American (2008)
- 10th place in Heisman voting (2008)
- First-team All-Big Ten (Coaches) (2008)
- First-team All-Big Ten (Media) (2008)
- 3rd in Doak Walker award voting (2008)
- Maxwell Award semifinalist (2008)
- Walter Camp Award semifinalist (2008)
- Associated Press First-team All-American (2008)
- Big Ten Player of the Year candidate (2008)
- College Football News Top 10 Player Race- 7th (2008)
- College Football All-American (2008)
- Michigan State team MVP (2008)
- Clarence J. Underwood Jr. Sportsmanship Award (2008)
- 2009 Senior Bowl invitee (Declined invite)

==== Bowl games ====
- 2007 Champs Sports Bowl (L)
- 2009 Capital One Bowl (L)

== See also ==
- List of college football yearly rushing leaders
