= Greg Jones (linebacker, born 1988) =

American gridiron football player (born 1988)

No. 53, 54
- Position: Linebacker

Personal information
- Born: October 5, 1988 (age 38); Cincinnati, Ohio, U.S.
- Listed height: 6 ft 0 in (1.83 m)
- Listed weight: 248 lb (112 kg)

Career information
- High school: Archbishop Moeller (Cincinnati)
- College: Michigan State (2007–2010)
- NFL draft: 2011: 6th round, 185th overall pick

Career history
- New York Giants (2011); Las Vegas Locomotives (2012); Jacksonville Jaguars (2012); Tennessee Titans (2013)*; Toronto Argonauts (2014–2015); Saskatchewan Roughriders (2016); Ottawa Redblacks (2017)
- * Offseason or practice squad member only

Awards and highlights
- Super Bowl champion (XLVI); CFL Eastern All-Star (2015); Unanimous All-American (2010); Consensus All-American (2009); Big Ten Co-Defensive Player of the Year (2009); 3× First-team All-Big Ten (2008–2010)

Career NFL statistics
- Total tackles: 31
- Fumble recoveries: 1
- Stats at Pro Football Reference

Gregory K. Jones (born October 5, 1988) is an American former professional football player who was a linebacker in the National Football League (NFL) and Canadian Football League (CFL). He played college football for the Michigan State Spartans, and was a two-time All-American selection. He was selected by the New York Giants in the sixth round of the 2011 NFL draft, and won the Super Bowl XLVI with them. He was also a member of the Jacksonville Jaguars and Tennessee Titans of the NFL, the Toronto Argonauts and Saskatchewan Roughriders of the CFL, and the Las Vegas Locomotives of the United Football League (UFL).

== Early life ==
Jones was born in Cincinnati, Ohio. He attended Archbishop Moeller High School in Cincinnati. He was a two-time All-Greater Catholic League and PrepStar's All-Midwest Team selection for coach Bob Crable. As a junior in 2005, he had 13 tackles for losses, including three sacks. As a senior in 2006 he had 71 tackles, 23.5 tackles for loss and 11.5 sacks.

Jones was rated as a three-star recruit by Rivals.com and was ranked as the 34th best outside linebacker in his class. Scout.com had him ranked as the 24th best strong side linebacker.

== College career ==
Jones received an athletic scholarship to attend Michigan State University, where he played for the Michigan State Spartans football team from 2007 to 2010.

=== 2007 ===
As a true freshman in 2007, Jones was named a first-team Freshman All-American by the Football Writers Association of America, Sporting News, CollegeFootballNews.com, Rivals.com and Scout.com. He led the Spartans with 78 tackles, becoming the first true freshman to lead the team in tackles since Dan Bass in 1976. The 78 tackles also ranked first among Big Ten freshmen. In his first career start, he had eight tackles and 1.5 tackles for losses against Northwestern. He also had four sacks.

=== 2008 ===
As a sophomore in 2008, Jones was named first-team All-Big Ten by the head coaches and second-team pick by the media. He was the first Spartan linebacker to earn All-Big ten first-team since Josh Thornhill in 2001. Jones was also named to Collegefootballnews.com's all sophomore team. He was awarded Michigan State's Outstanding Underclass Back award. He started all 13 games, again leading the team in tackles with 127 and had two sacks.

=== 2009 ===
As a junior in 2009, Jones recorded 154 tackles and nine sacks and was recognized as a consensus first-team All-American. The 154 tackles led the team for the third straight year and was most in the Big Ten. Jones was also the Big Ten Defensive Player of the Year, becoming the first Spartan to earn the honor. He earned first-team All-Big Ten for the second consecutive year.

=== 2010 ===
As a senior in 2010, Jones had 98 tackles, a sack and two interceptions. He was named a first-team All-Big Ten selection for the third consecutive year, and was recognized as a unanimous first-team All-American.

== Professional career ==
Pre-draft measurables
Height	Weight	Arm length	Hand span	Wingspan	40-yard dash	10-yard split	20-yard split	20-yard shuttle	Three-cone drill	Vertical jump	Broad jump	Bench press
6 ft 0 1/8 in (1.83 m)	242 lb (110 kg)	32 in (0.81 m)	10 in (0.25 m)	6 ft 4 3/8 in (1.94 m)	4.72 s	1.68 s	2.72 s	4.27 s	7.27 s	31.5 in (0.80 m)	9 ft 9 in (2.97 m)	21 reps
All values from NFL Combine/Pro Day

=== New York Giants ===
The New York Giants selected Jones in the sixth round (185th overall pick) of the 2011 NFL draft. Jones became the Giants' starting middle linebacker after a season-ending injury to Jonathan Goff. He was waived on August 31, 2012.

=== Las Vegas Locomotive ===
Jones briefly played for the Las Vegas Locomotives of the United Football League, but left when the team didn't pay him, before the league folded.

=== Jacksonville Jaguars ===
Jones signed with the Jacksonville Jaguars on November 12, 2012. Battling through an ankle injury all season, he was placed on season-ending injured reserve with a broken leg on December 24. He was released on May 6, 2013.

=== Tennessee Titans ===
On May 15, 2013, Jones signed with the Tennessee Titans. After missing several preseason games with an ankle injury, he was waived/injured by the Titans on August 26, 2013. On August 27, 2013, he cleared waivers and was placed on the Titans' reserve/injured list. On August 31, 2013, he was waived from reserve/injured with an injury settlement.

=== Toronto Argonauts ===
He signed with the Toronto Argonauts on March 27, 2014, choosing the Argonauts over the Montreal Alouettes.

=== Saskatchewan Roughriders ===
Jones was signed by the Saskatchewan Roughriders on February 10, 2016.

== Personal life ==
Jones proposed to his girlfriend, Mandy Piechowski, a former Michigan State women's basketball player, on the field after the Giants won Super Bowl XLVI, and they married in July 2013. Their daughter Ava was born in 2014. Jones graduated from Michigan State University in May 2015.
