= PrepStar College Recruiting =

- Available in: English
- Founded: 1999
- Headquarters: Woodland, California, {{{location_country}}}
- Website: PrepStar College Recruiting

PrepStar College Recruiting, known also as PrepStar, is an online magazine at www.prepstar.com, which was established in 1982. It provides information on the top football and basketball prospects in the United States. The online magazine is produced by College Sports USA, which was founded by Jeff Duva, a former college quarterback, and Jack Wright.

In 1999, Duva was its publisher, and Rick Kimbrel was its editor. It is located in Woodland Hills, California.
