= Kevin Newsome =

American football player (born 1991)

No. 12, 7
- Position: Quarterback

Personal information
- Born: January 21, 1991 (age 35); Portsmouth, Virginia, U.S.
- Listed height: 6 ft 2 in (1.88 m)
- Listed weight: 225 lb (102 kg)

Career information
- High school: Hargrave Military Academy; (Chatham, Virginia); Western Branch High School; (Chesapeake, Virginia)
- College: Penn State (2009–2011); Temple (2012)

Awards and highlights
- U.S. Army All-American (2008); Penn Relays 4x100m champion: Nike Track & Field All-American: 60m; & 110m high hurdles (2007, 2008)
- Stats at ESPN

Kevin Leonardo Newsome, Jr. (born January 21, 1991) is an American former college football quarterback from Portsmouth, Virginia who played for the Penn State Nittany Lions football team from 2009 to 2011, and for the Temple Owls football team in 2012.

== Early life ==
Newsome was born in Portsmouth, Virginia and attended Western Branch High School in Chesapeake, Virginia until his junior year, where he transferred to Hargrave Military Academy in Chatham, Virginia.

At Western Branch High School, Newsome lettered in football and track and field. In his junior year of football, he passed for more than 1,600 yards and twelve touchdowns, and rushed for more than 500 yards and eleven touchdowns. Participating in track and field as a sprinter and hurdler, Newsome was ranked fourth in the nation as a hurdler and earned All-America honors while becoming a high hurdle state champion twice during his junior year of high school. Newsome helped to bring home first place honors while running last leg for Western Branch High School in the 2008 Penn Relays 4x1 meter relay championship race, and was the captain of the track and field team. As the only freshman on his track and field team, he finished tenth at the Virginia state championships. Newsome served as the president of his junior class and earned a 3.7 GPA, while becoming a member of the National Honor Society.

At Hargrave Military Academy, Newsome was coached by Robert Prunty as a true high school senior. He was selected to participate in the U.S. Army All-American Bowl. Newsome would go to have the most rushing yards in the game while completing one pass on one attempt for 45 yards to Logan Thomas. Scout.com ranked him as the No. 10 quarterback nationally and Rivals.com placed him on the list of Top 40 prep players nationally. Both Scout.com and Rivals.com rated him as a four-star recruiting prospect, while ESPN.com gave him a scouts grade of 80.

College recruiting
Name	Hometown	School	Height	Weight	40^{‡}	Commit date
Kevin Newsome; QB	Portsmouth, Virginia	Western Branch High School/Hargrave Military Academy	6 ft 3 in (1.91 m)	213 lb (97 kg)	4.50	Dec 16, 2008
Kevin Newsome; QB	Recruit ratings: Scout: Rivals: (80)					
Overall recruit ranking: Scout: 10 (QB) Rivals: 163, 4 (dual threat QB), 9 (VA)
Note: In many cases, Scout, Rivals, 247Sports, On3, and ESPN may conflict in their listings of height and weight.; In these cases, the average was taken. ESPN grades are on a 100-point scale.; Sources: "Penn State Football Commitments". Rivals.; "2009 Penn State Football Commits". Scout.; "ESPN". ESPN.; "Scout.com Team Recruiting Rankings". Scout.; "2009 Team Ranking". Rivals.com.

== College career ==
=== Penn State ===
Newsome originally committed to Michigan during his junior year of high school, but later decommitted during his senior year to take Penn State's scholarship offer. Before accepting Penn State's offer, he had received over 40 scholarship offers, including ones from Boston College, North Carolina, Ohio State, Virginia Tech, and West Virginia.

==== 2009 season ====
Newsome enrolled at Penn State in January 2009 in order to prepare for the academic and athletic rigorousness before camp began. He took part in winter conditioning and spring practice before the 2009 season began, in an attempt to become the top backup to starter Daryll Clark. In the Blue-White scrimmage on April 25, Newsome played for both teams and went 9-of-13 for 71 yards, and threw a nine-yard touchdown pass to wide receiver Brett Brackett.

In his Nittany Lion debut against Akron at home on September 5, Newsome went 3-for-4, threw for 26 yards, and rushed for 12 yards on two carries. Against Syracuse, he fumbled the ball on a sack, which gave the Orange their only points (against Nittany Lion reserves), but recovered from that mistake to lead the Nittany Lions into the red zone, at which point he was relieved by third-stringer Matt McGloin, who had his first instance of playing time. Against Temple, he played in the final two drives, but little else, and he ran for a first down to kill the clock against Illinois. Against Eastern Illinois on October 10, Newsome passed for 34 yards on four completions. He rushed for 49 yards on seven carries and scored his first career touchdown to put Penn State up 52-3. He led Penn State to a second drive into the red zone late in the fourth quarter before being relieved by McGloin. Against Minnesota, he handed the ball off a few times, but saw little action elsewhere. Against Northwestern, after the Nittany Lions had put the game away 34-13 early in the fourth quarter, Newsome nearly led them to another scoring drive, but were forced to punt. He also saw this degree of playing time against Indiana. Against Michigan State, he scored his second career touchdown to give Penn State a 42-7 lead over the Alamo Bowl-bound Spartans and score his first touchdown against an FBS team and against a Big Ten team, following Michigan State's touchdown pass to Keshawn Martin against reserves.

In 2009, Newsome went 8-for-11 for 66 yards overall, with a completion percentage of 72.7%. He rushed for 95 yards on 20 carries and scored two touchdown. He averaged 4.75 yards per carry. He was one of only eight true freshmen to play for Penn State in 2009. He played in every game of the 2009 season except for the Iowa and Ohio State losses and the 19-17 Capital One Bowl victory against LSU.

==== 2010 season ====
Following Daryll Clark's graduation, Newsome was expected to compete with Matt McGloin and freshman Robert Bolden for the starting quarterback job in 2010. In the Blue-White game on April 24, Newsome went 5-for-12 for 50 yards and took three sacks.

In the first preseason depth chart, Newsome was listed as the co-starter at quarterback with McGloin, however, coach Joe Paterno named Bolden as the starter for the season-opener against Youngstown State over Newsome and McGloin. On the official depth chart, Newsome, Bolden, and McGloin were all listed as co-starters. Newsome had three carries for 21 yards and a touchdown after he entered the game in the fourth quarter. He only attempted one pass in the game, but it drew a pass interference flag from the defense. He was relieved by McGloin on the final drive. Newsome had some playing time in the 24-3 loss to Alabama, in which he completed one pass for 12 yards in an attempt to further cut into the 24-3 Alabama lead. He also saw some playing time against Kent State (one-of-three for three yards), Temple (handed off the ball on the final drive), and very nearly led late touchdown drives against Iowa (two-for-four for 35 yards), and Illinois (2-for-5 for 28 yards). He shared time with McGloin against Minnesota after Bolden suffered a concussion in the first half, and attempted no passes but lead Penn State to a field goal to answer a Minnesota score to restore a two-point lead in an eventual 33-21 romp in which Penn State once held a 33-14 lead. By the end of the season, Newsome was behind McGloin, the new starter, and Bolden on the depth chart.

For the season, Newsome went 6-for-13 for 78 yards and had 13 carries for 66 yards and a touchdown. It was reported on December 9, 2010, that Newsome planned to transfer from Penn State following the season due to a low amount of playing time during the season. Paterno said about Newsome's possible transfer, "We think he's a fine prospect. Having said that, at this stage, he's not quite as far along as the others." Newsome did not make the trip to Tampa, Florida for the team's Outback Bowl appearance against Florida on January 1, 2011. However, Newsome enrolled in classes for the spring, and decided to stay with the team.

==== 2011 season ====
With a possible transfer still looming, Newsome ran the second-string offense with redshirt freshman Paul Jones during spring practice, behind first-stringers Bolden and McGloin. Coach Paterno commented that Newsome had "to do a little better job in the classroom. He's a bright kid, but he has a tendency once in a while to not pay attention to the academic part of it. Until he does, I'm not going to count on him." In the Blue−White game on April 16, 2011, Newsome went 3-for-7 for 22 yards, and Paterno said Newsome was third on the depth chart. Newsome was expected to compete with Jones for the third-string quarterback position before the 2011 season, but after Jones was declared academically ineligible for the season on July 29, Newsome's competition remained Shane McGregor for the number three quarterback job. However, on August 4, Newsome left the Penn State football team and sought a transfer. In an interview following his transfer from Penn State, Newsome said he felt "depressed" after receiving notice that he would not be the starting quarterback.

=== Temple ===
==== 2012 season ====
Newsome earned an associate degree in General Studies while attending Tidewater Community College in Virginia after announcing his intent to transfer from Penn State in August 2011. He verbally committed to Temple University as a transfer in January 2012 after sitting out the 2011 season. Newsome, after also considering Richmond and Hampton, officially signed a letter-of-intent with the Owls on February 1, 2012, but was not able to officially transfer until after graduation in July 2012. Temple head coach Steve Addazio said Chris Coyer, the starting quarterback for the Owls late in the 2011 season, will be the starting quarterback over Newsome before entering training camp in 2012. He spent the 2012 season as the third-string quarterback, and was expected to be moved to halfback before he decided not to return to football in 2013.

=== College statistics ===
Season	Team	GP	Passing							Rushing		
Season	Team	GP	Cmp	Att	Pct	Yds	TD	Int	Rtg	Att	Yds	TD
2009	Penn State	9	8	11	72.7	66	0	0	123.1	20	95	2
2010	Penn State	6	6	13	46.2	78	0	0	96.6	14	59	1
2012	Temple	2	0	1	0.0	0	0	0	0.0	5	57	0
Totals		17	14	25	56.0	144	0	0	109.9	39	211	3

== Personal ==
Newsome's parents are Kevin and Theresa Newsome. He has a younger brother, Keevon, who plays college football for Richmond. His father played college football at Saint Paul's College as a running back. Newsome became a member of Omega Psi Phi fraternity while attending Penn State University (N Chapter).
