= 2010 Big Ten Conference football season =

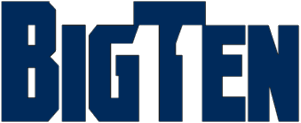
- League: NCAA Division I FBS (Football Bowl Subdivision)
- Sport: football
- Duration: September 2, 2010 through January 4, 2011
- Teams: 11
- TV partner(s): ABC, ESPN, ESPN2, Big Ten Network

2011 NFL Draft
- Top draft pick: J. J. Watt (Wisconsin)
- Picked by: Houston Texans, #11

Regular Season
- Conference Co-Champions: Wisconsin Badgers; Michigan State Spartans
- Season MVP: Denard Robinson

Football seasons
- 2009 2011

2010 Big Ten Conference football standings
	Conf.			Overall
Team	W		L	W		L
No. 14 Michigan State +	7	–	1	11	–	2
No. 7 Wisconsin $+	7	–	1	11	–	2
Iowa	4	–	4	8	–	5
Illinois	4	–	4	7	–	6
Penn State	4	–	4	7	–	6
Michigan	3	–	5	7	–	6
Northwestern	3	–	5	7	–	6
Purdue	2	–	6	4	–	8
Minnesota	2	–	6	3	–	9
Indiana	1	–	7	5	–	7
No. 5 Ohio State† %	0	–	1	0	–	1
$ – BCS representative as conference champion; % – BCS at-large representative; + – Conference co-champions; † – Ohio State (12–1, 7–1) self-vacated all of their wins; Rankings from AP Poll

The 2010 Big Ten Conference football season was the 115th season for the Big Ten. The conference started its season on Thursday, September 2, as conference member Minnesota traveled to Murfreesboro, Tennessee to face Middle Tennessee, and Ohio State hosted the Thundering Herd of Marshall. The conference's other 9 teams began their respective 2010 season of NCAA Division I FBS (Football Bowl Subdivision) competition on Saturday, September 4. It was also the final season for the conference before the Nebraska Cornhuskers joined the conference from the Big 12 the following season.

== Preseason ==
After a 2010 NFL draft, which saw 34 Big Ten athletes selected, 12 2009 first-team All-Big Ten selections, 8 second-team selections and 33 honorable mention selections returned for the 2010 season. The Big Ten held the 2010 Football Media Days and 39th annual Kickoff Luncheon on Monday and Tuesday, August 2–3.

== Schedules ==
In a given year, each Big Ten team will play eight of the other Big Ten teams. Thus for any given team in a given year, there are two others which will not be competed against. Below is the breakdown of each team and its two "no-plays" for 2010:

- Illinois: Iowa, Wisconsin
- Indiana: Michigan State, Minnesota
- Iowa: Illinois, Purdue
- Michigan: Minnesota, Northwestern
- Michigan State: Indiana, Ohio State
- Minnesota: Indiana, Michigan
- Northwestern: Michigan, Ohio State
- Ohio State: Michigan State, Northwestern
- Penn State: Purdue, Wisconsin
- Purdue: Iowa, Penn State
- Wisconsin: Illinois, Penn State

== Rankings ==
In Weeks 3 and 4, the Big Ten had six teams ranked in both polls for the first time since September 13, 2004.

		Pre	Wk 1	Wk 2	Wk 3	Wk 4	Wk 5	Wk 6	Wk 7	Wk 8	Wk 9	Wk 10	Wk 11	Wk 12	Wk 13	Wk 14	Final
Illinois	AP										RV						
Illinois	C									RV	RV						
Illinois	Harris	Not released						RV									
Illinois	BCS	Not released															
Indiana	AP																
Indiana	C																
Indiana	Harris	Not released															
Indiana	BCS	Not released															
Iowa	AP	9	9	9	18	17	15	15	13	18	15	13	21				
Iowa	C	10	9	10	18	18	15	14	12	19	16	13	20				
Iowa	Harris	Not released						15	12	17	14	12	19				
Iowa	BCS	Not released							15	18	16	13	20				
Michigan	AP		RV	20	21	19	18	RV	RV	RV			RV				
Michigan	C		RV	22	22	19	17	24	RV	25	RV	RV	RV				
Michigan	Harris	Not released						24	RV	RV	RV	RV	RV				
Michigan	BCS	Not released															
Michigan State	AP		RV	RV	25	24	17	13	8	5	16	10	11	11	7	7	
Michigan State	C	RV	RV	RV	23	21	16	11	8	5	15	10	11	10	7	7	
Michigan State	Harris	Not released						12	8	5	16	10	10	10	7	7	
Michigan State	BCS	Not released							7	5	14	11	12	10	8	9	
Minnesota	AP																
Minnesota	C																
Minnesota	Harris	Not released															
Minnesota	BCS	Not released															
Northwestern	AP			RV	RV	RV	RV	RV	RV	RV	RV		RV				
Northwestern	C	RV	RV	RV	RV	RV	25	RV	RV	RV	RV		25				
Northwestern	Harris	Not released						RV	RV	RV	RV	RV					
Northwestern	BCS	Not released															
Ohio State	AP	2	2	2	2	2	2	1	11	10	8	8	8				
Ohio State	C	2	2	2	2	2	2	1	10	10	8	7	7				
Ohio State	Harris	Not released						1	10	10	8	7	7				
Ohio State	BCS	Not released							10	11	11	9	9				
Penn State	AP	19	18	22	23	22	RV					RV					
Penn State	C	14	14	20	20	20	RV					RV	RV				
Penn State	Harris	Not released										RV	RV				
Penn State	BCS	Not released															
Purdue	AP																
Purdue	C																
Purdue	Harris	Not released															
Purdue	BCS	Not released															
Wisconsin	AP	12	11	11	11	11	20	18	10	9	7	6	5				
Wisconsin	C	12	11	11	10	9	19	16	11	9	7	5	5				
Wisconsin	Harris	Not released						16	11	9	7	5	5				
Wisconsin	BCS	Not released							13	10	9	7	7				

== Spring games ==
April 17

- Indiana
- Iowa
- Michigan
- Purdue
- Wisconsin

April 24

- Illinois
- Michigan State
- Minnesota
- Northwestern
- Ohio State
- Penn State

== Season ==
=== Homecoming games ===
October 2

- Penn State @ Iowa 7:05 p.m. CT (Iowa's record in homecoming games is 52-41-5)
- Northwestern @ Minnesota 11:00 a.m. CT (Minnesota's record in homecoming games is 54-33-3)

October 9

- Illinois @ Penn State 12:00 p.m. ET (Penn State's record in homecoming games is 65-20-5)
- Minnesota @ Wisconsin 11:00 a.m. ET (Wisconsin's record in homecoming games is 52-45-5)

October 16

- Arkansas State @ Indiana 12:00 p.m. ET (Indiana's record in homecoming games is 43-48-6)
- Iowa @ Michigan 3:30 p.m. ET (Michigan's record in homecoming games is 83–26)
- Illinois @ Michigan State 12:00 p.m. ET (Michigan State's record in homecoming games is 61-30-3)
- Minnesota @ Purdue 12:00 p.m. ET (Purdue's record in homecoming games is 48-35-4)

October 23

- Indiana @ Illinois 11:00 a.m. CT (Illinois's record in homecoming games is 42-55-2)
- Michigan State @ Northwestern 11:00 a.m. CT
- Purdue @ Ohio State 12:00 p.m. ET (Ohio State's record in homecoming games is 64-19-5)

On September 25, Joe Paterno became the fifth head coach to earn 150 victories as a member of the Big Ten Conference. On October 9, Jim Tressel became the first Big Ten head coach to earn 100 victories in his first ten seasons, surpassing Bo Schembechler and Lloyd Carr who achieved the milestone in their 11th seasons and he did so in the third fewest games (121), behind Schembechler and Fielding Yost (119) and ahead of Henry Williams (123). (The wins for the 2010 season were later vacated.) On November 6, Paterno became the first FBS coach to total 400 career wins.

== Big Ten vs. BCS matchups ==
Date	Visitor	Home	Significance	Winning team
September 4	Illinois	Missouri	Arch Rivalry	Missouri
September 4	Connecticut	Michigan		Michigan
September 4	Northwestern	Vanderbilt		Northwestern
September 4	Purdue	Notre Dame	Shillelagh Trophy	Notre Dame
September 11	Iowa State	Iowa	Cy-Hawk Trophy	Iowa
September 11	Michigan	Notre Dame	Michigan – Notre Dame rivalry	Michigan
September 11	Miami	Ohio State	Rematch of 2003 Fiesta Bowl (2002 National Championship)	Ohio State (Vacated)
September 11	Penn State	Alabama		Alabama
September 18	USC	Minnesota		USC
September 18	Iowa	Arizona		Arizona
September 18	Notre Dame	Michigan State	Megaphone Trophy	Michigan State
September 18	Arizona State	Wisconsin		Wisconsin

== Attendance ==
Week 3 attendance (September 18) set an all-time Big Ten single-day attendance record with an average of 78,844. All eight games had crowds of over 50,000; Michigan State (78,411), Wisconsin (81,332), Ohio State (105,075) and Michigan (110,187) had sellouts; and 100,610 patrons were in attendance for Penn State. It surpassed the September 3, 2005 eight-game single-day average of 76,475. On October 9, the Big Ten set a five-game attendance record of 88,034, surpassing the 87,620, set on October 28, 1995. Michigan, Ohio State, Penn State and Wisconsin all hosted sellouts.

Team	Stadium	Capacity	Game 1	Game 2	Game 3	Game 4	Game 5	Game 6	Game 7	Game 8	Total	Average	% of Capacity
Illinois	Memorial Stadium	62,872	52,217	50,569	62,870	53,550	50,371	55,549	—	—	325,126	54,188	86.2
Indiana	Memorial Stadium	52,929	35,242	42,258	52,929	40,480	37,818	42,991	—	—	251,718	41,953	79.3
Iowa	Kinnick Stadium	70,585	70,585	70,585	70,585	70,585	70,585	70,585	70,585	—	494,095	70,585	100
Michigan	Michigan Stadium	109,901	113,090	110,187	109,933	113,065	112,784	111,441	112,276	—	782,782	111,826	101.8
Michigan State	Spartan Stadium	75,005	75,769	78,411	70,926	73,108	74,441	71,128	71,111	—	514,984	73,556	98.1
Minnesota	TCF Bank Stadium	50,805	49,554	50,422	49,368	49,228	48,479	48,717	50,805	—	346,573	49,510	97.5
Northwestern	Ryan Field	47,130	25,471	30,075	33,847	41,115	47,130	—	—	—	177,638	35,527	75.4
Ohio State	Ohio Stadium	102,329	105,040	105,454	105,075	105,017	105,291	105,387	105,466	105,491	842,231	105,278	102.9
Penn State	Beaver Stadium	107,282	101,213	100,610	104,840	107,638	108,539	104,147	102,649	—	729,636	104,233	97.2
Purdue	Ross–Ade Stadium	62,500	47,301	54,124	42,068	47,319	45,227	50,268	50,136	—	190,812	48,063	76.9
Wisconsin	Camp Randall Stadium	80,321	78,469	81,332	77,224	80,328	81,194	80,477	80,011	—	559,035	79,862	99.4

== Bowl games ==
The following is the Big Ten Bowl game schedule.

Bowl	Date	Opponents	Winner*	Score	Loser*	Score	Location	Time^{+}	Network	Big Ten's Records	Notes
Insight Bowl	December 28, 2010	Iowa vs. Missouri	**Iowa**	27	Missouri	24	Tempe, Arizona	6 p.m.	ESPN	1-0	
Texas Bowl	December 29, 2010	Illinois vs. Baylor	**Illinois**	38	Baylor	14	Houston, Texas	5 p.m.	ESPN	2-0	
Capital One Bowl	January 1, 2011	Michigan State vs. Alabama	Alabama	49	**Michigan State**	7	Orlando, Florida	1 p.m.	ESPN	2-1	
Outback Bowl	January 1, 2011	Penn State vs. Florida	Florida	37	**Penn State**	24	Tampa, Florida	1 p.m.	ABC	2-2	
TicketCity Bowl	January 1, 2011	Northwestern vs. Texas Tech	Texas Tech	45	**Northwestern**	38	Dallas, Texas		ESPNU	2-3	
Gator Bowl	January 1, 2011	Michigan vs. Mississippi State	Mississippi State	52	**Michigan**	14	Jacksonville, Florida	1:30 p.m.	ESPN2	2-4	
Rose Bowl presented by Vizio	January 1, 2011	Wisconsin vs. TCU	TCU	21	**Wisconsin**	19	Pasadena, California	2:10 p.m.	ESPN	2-5	
Sugar Bowl	January 4, 2011	Ohio State vs. Arkansas	Ohio State (Vacated)	31	Arkansas	26	New Orleans, Louisiana	8:30 p.m.	ESPN	2-5	
*Big Ten team is **bolded**. ^{+}Time given is Central Time

== Head coaches ==
- Ron Zook, Illinois
- Bill Lynch, Indiana
- Kirk Ferentz, Iowa
- Rich Rodriguez, Michigan
- Mark Dantonio, Michigan State
- Tim Brewster, Minnesota (first 7 games) and Jeff Horton, Minnesota (last 5 games)
- Pat Fitzgerald, Northwestern
- Jim Tressel, Ohio State
- Joe Paterno, Penn State
- Danny Hope, Purdue
- Bret Bielema, Wisconsin

== 2011 NFL draft ==
Rnd.	Pick	Team	Player	Pos.	College	Notes
1	11	Houston Texans	J. J. Watt	DE	Wisconsin	
1	16	Washington Redskins	Ryan Kerrigan	DE	Purdue	from Jacksonville (Note: #16: Jacksonville → Washington. (D) see #10: Washington → Jacksonville.)
1	18	San Diego Chargers	Corey Liuget	DT	Illinois	
1	20	Tampa Bay Buccaneers	Adrian Clayborn	DE	Iowa	
1	29	Chicago Bears	Gabe Carimi	T	Wisconsin	
1	31	Pittsburgh Steelers	Cameron Heyward	DE	Ohio State	
2	47	St. Louis Rams	Lance Kendricks	TE	Wisconsin	
2	48	Oakland Raiders	Stefen Wisniewski	C	Penn State	
2	57	Detroit Lions	Mikel Leshoure	RB	Illinois	from Seattle
2	61	San Diego Chargers	Jonas Mouton	LB	Michigan	from New York Jets (Note: #61: New York Jets → San Diego (PD). The Jets traded this conditional selection to San Diego for cornerback Antonio Cromartie.)
3	72	New Orleans Saints	Martez Wilson	LB	Illinois	from Washington (Note: #72: Washington → New Orleans (PD). Washington traded this selection and a conditional 2012 sixth-round selection to New Orleans for offensive tackle Jammal Brown and a fifth-round selection.)
3	75	Seattle Seahawks	John Moffitt	G	Wisconsin	from Detroit
4	106	Minnesota Vikings	Christian Ballard	DE	Iowa	from
4	113	Oakland Raiders	Chimdi Chekwa	CB	Ohio State	
4	117	New York Giants	James Brewer	T	Indiana	
4	123	Baltimore Ravens	Tandon Doss	WR	Indiana	
5	135	Kansas City Chiefs	Ricky Stanzi	QB	Iowa	from Denver via Tampa Bay (Note: #135: multiple trades: #135: Denver → Tampa Bay (PD). Denver traded this selection to Tampa Bay for a 2010 seventh-round selection it acquired from Pittsburgh (225th overall; Denver selected Syd'Quan Thompson) and a 2010 seventh-round selection it acquired from Baltimore (232nd overall; Denver selected Jammie Kirlew). #135: Tampa Bay → Kansas City (PD). Tampa Bay traded this selection to Kansas City for Kansas City's 6th round selection (#187) and defensive tackle Alex Magee.)
5	142	Tennessee Titans	Karl Klug	DE	Iowa	
5	158	St. Louis Rams	Jermale Hines	S	Ohio State	from Atlanta
5	161	Philadelphia Eagles	Julian Vandervelde	G	Iowa	from New York Jets
6	177	Washington Redskins	Evan Royster	RB	Penn State	
6	185	New York Giants	Greg Jones	LB	Michigan State	
6	188	Indianapolis Colts	Chris L. Rucker	CB	Michigan State	
6	193	Philadelphia Eagles	Brian Rolle	LB	Ohio State	from New England
6*	198	New York Giants	Tyler Sash	S	Iowa	
6*	200	Minnesota Vikings	Ross Homan	LB	Ohio State	
6*	201	San Diego Chargers	Stephen Schilling	G	Michigan	
7*	243	New Orleans Saints	Nathan Bussey	LB	Illinois	
7^	252	Dallas Cowboys	Bill Nagy	C	Wisconsin	

== Awards ==
2010 All-Big Ten Conference Football Team

As selected by CONFERENCE COACHES

FIRST TEAM	OFFENSE	SECOND TEAM
Dan Persa, Northwestern	Quarterback	Scott Tolzien, Wisconsin
Mikel Leshoure, Illinois	Running Back	Evan Royster, Penn State
Dan Herron, Ohio State	Running Back	John Clay, Wisconsin
Tandon Doss, Indiana*	Receiver	Marvin McNutt, Iowa#
Derrell Johnson-Koulianos, Iowa*	Receiver	
Dane Sanzenbacher, Ohio State*	Receiver	
David Molk, Michigan	Center	Mike Brewster, Ohio State
Stefen Wisniewski, Penn State	Guard	Julian Vandervelde, Iowa
John Moffitt, Wisconsin	Guard	Justin Boren, Ohio State
Mike Adams, Ohio State	Tackle	Riley Reiff, Iowa
Gabe Carimi, Wisconsin	Tackle	D.J. Young, Michigan State
Lance Kendricks, Wisconsin	Tight End	Allen Reisner, Iowa
Dan Conroy, Michigan State	Kicker	Derek Dimke, Illinois
FIRST TEAM	DEFENSE	SECOND TEAM
Adrian Clayborn, Iowa	Line	Corey Liuget, Illinois
Cameron Heyward, Ohio State	Line	Karl Klug, Iowa
Ryan Kerrigan, Purdue	Line	Mike Martin, Michigan
J.J. Watt, Wisconsin	Line	Ollie Ogbu, Penn State
Greg Jones, Michigan State	Linebacker	Martez Wilson, Illinois
Ross Homan, Ohio State	Linebacker	Jeremiha Hunter, Iowa
Brian Rolle, Ohio State	Linebacker	Eric Gordon, Michigan State
Shaun Prater, Iowa	Defensive Back	Brett Greenwood, Iowa*
Tyler Sash, Iowa	Defensive Back	Johnny Adams, Michigan State*
Chimdi Chekwa, Ohio State	Defensive Back	Trenton Robinson, Michigan State*
Jermale Hines, Ohio State	Defensive Back	Chris L. Rucker, Michigan State*
	Defensive Back	Aaron Henry, Wisconsin*
Anthony Santella, Illinois	Punter	Aaron Bates, Michigan State

HONORABLE MENTION: ILLINOIS: Jeff Allen, Nate Bussey, Trulon Henry, Graham Pocic, Tavon Wilson; INDIANA: Damarlo Belcher, James Brewer, Mitch Ewald; IOWA: Christian Ballard, Mike Daniels, Adam Robinson, Ryan Donahue; MICHIGAN: Denard Robinson, Stephen Schilling; MICHIGAN STATE: Edwin Baker, Kirk Cousins, Mark Dell, Joel Foreman, Charlie Gantt, Marcus Hyde, Jerel Worthy; MINNESOTA: D.J. Burris; NORTHWESTERN: Drake Dunsmore, Jeremy Ebert, Brian Peters; OHIO STATE: Devin Barclay, DeVier Posey, Terrelle Pryor, John Simon; PENN STATE: Quinn Barham, Chris Colasanti, D'Anton Lynn, Derek Moye; PURDUE: Ricardo Allen, Dwayne Beckford, Carson Wiggs; WISCONSIN: Montee Ball, Niles Brinkley, Antonio Fenelus, Peter Konz, Bill Nagy, Blake Sorensen, Mike Taylor, Ricky Wagner, Philip Welch, James White, Kevin Zeitler.

OFFENSIVE PLAYER OF THE YEAR:	Denard Robinson, Michigan
OFFENSIVE LINEMAN OF THE YEAR:	Gabe Carimi, Wisconsin
DEFENSIVE PLAYER OF THE YEAR:	Ryan Kerrigan, Purdue
DEFENSIVE LINEMAN OF THE YEAR:	Ryan Kerrigan, Purdue
FRESHMAN OF THE YEAR:	James White, Wisconsin

Big Ten Sportsmanship Award Honorees: Tavon Wilson, ILL; Tyler Replogle, IND; Ricky Stanzi, IOWA; Mark Moundros, MICH; Kirk Cousins, MSU; Jon Hoese, MINN; Corbin Bryant, NU; Bryant Browning, OSU; Brett Brackett, PSU; Ryan Kerrigan, PUR; Scott Tolzien, WIS.

* Additional honorees due to ties

# Second team reduced by one due to additional first-team honoree

2010 All-Big Ten Conference Football Team

As selected by CONFERENCE MEDIA

FIRST TEAM	OFFENSE	SECOND TEAM
Denard Robinson, Michigan	Quarterback	Dan Persa, Northwestern
Mikel Leshoure, Illinois	Running Back	John Clay, Wisconsin
Edwin Baker, Michigan State	Running Back	James White, Wisconsin
Jeremy Ebert, Northwestern	Receiver	Tandon Doss, Indiana
Dane Sanzenbacher, Ohio State	Receiver	Roy Roundtree, Michigan
Mike Brewster, Ohio State	Center	David Molk, Michigan
Justin Boren, Ohio State	Guard	Julian Vandervelde, Iowa
John Moffitt, Wisconsin	Guard	Stefen Wisniewski, Penn State
Mike Adams, Ohio State	Tackle	Jeff Allen, Illinois
Gabe Carimi, Wisconsin	Tackle	Riley Reiff, Iowa
Lance Kendricks, Wisconsin	Tight End	Charlie Gantt, Michigan State
Dan Conroy, Michigan State	Kicker	Devin Barclay, Ohio State
FIRST TEAM	DEFENSE	SECOND TEAM
Adrian Clayborn, Iowa	Line	Corey Liuget, Illinois
Cameron Heyward, Ohio State	Line	Karl Klug, Iowa
Ryan Kerrigan, Purdue	Line	Vince Browne, Northwestern
J.J. Watt, Wisconsin	Line	Kawann Short, Purdue
Martez Wilson, Illinois	Linebacker	Jonas Mouton, Michigan
Greg Jones, Michigan State	Linebacker	Eric Gordon, Michigan State
Brian Rolle, Ohio State	Linebacker	Ross Homan, Ohio State
Shaun Prater, Iowa	Defensive Back	Marcus Hyde, Michigan State
Tyler Sash, Iowa	Defensive Back	Brian Peters, Northwestern
Chimdi Chekwa, Ohio State	Defensive Back	Jermale Hines, Ohio State
Antonio Fenelus, Wisconsin	Defensive Back	Ricardo Allen, Purdue
Aaron Bates, Michigan State	Punter	Anthony Santella, Illinois

HONORABLE MENTION: ILLINOIS: Nate Bussey, Derek Dimke, Trulon Henry, Graham Pocic, Tavon Wilson; INDIANA: Ted Bolser, Ben Chappell, Damarlo Belcher, James Brewer, Tyler Replogle; IOWA: Christian Ballard, Mike Daniels, Brett Greenwood, Jeremiha Hunter, Micah Hyde, Derrell Johnson-Koulianos, Marvin McNutt, Allen Reisner, Adam Robinson, Ryan Donahue; MICHIGAN: Jordan Kovacs, Mike Martin, Stephen Schilling; MICHIGAN STATE: Johnny Adams, Kirk Cousins, B.J. Cunningham, Mark Dell, Joel Foreman, Trenton Robinson, Chris L. Rucker, Jerel Worthy, D.J. Young; MINNESOTA: D.J. Burris, Troy Stoudermire, Gary Tinsley; NORTHWESTERN: Corbin Bryant, Drake Dunsmore, Jordan Mabin, Al Netter; OHIO STATE: Dan Herron, DeVier Posey, Terrelle Pryor, John Simon; PENN STATE: Drew Astorino, Quinn Barham, Chris Colasanti, D'Anton Lynn, Derek Moye, Ollie Ogbu, Evan Royster, Devon Still, Collin Wagner; PURDUE: Kyle Adams, Peters Drey, Dennis Kelly, Ken Plue, Cody Webster, Carson Wiggs; WISCONSIN: Montee Ball, Aaron Henry, Peter Konz, Blake Sorensen, Mike Taylor, Scott Tolzien, Ricky Wagner, Philip Welch, Kevin Zeitler.

OFFENSIVE PLAYER OF THE YEAR:	Denard Robinson, Michigan
DEFENSIVE PLAYER OF THE YEAR:	Ryan Kerrigan, Purdue
FRESHMAN OF THE YEAR:	James White, Wisconsin
DAVE McCLAIN COACH OF THE YEAR:	Mark Dantonio, Michigan State
