= Rob Bolden =

American football player (born 1992)

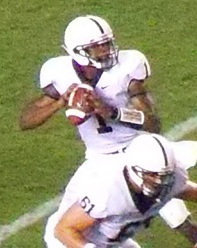
- Bolden with Penn State in 2010

No. 1
- Position: Quarterback

Personal information
- Born: February 20, 1992 (age 34); Detroit, Michigan, U.S.
- Listed height: 6 ft 3 in (1.91 m)
- Listed weight: 218 lb (99 kg)

Career information
- High school: St. Mary's Preparatory (Orchard Lake Village, Michigan)
- College: Penn State (2010–2011); LSU (2012–2013); Eastern Michigan (2014)
- NFL draft: 2015: undrafted

Robert Craig Bolden, Jr. (born February 20, 1992) is an American former football quarterback. After attending St. Mary's Preparatory School in Orchard Lake, Michigan, he played college football for the Penn State Nittany Lions from 2010 to 2011. He transferred to Louisiana State University and was a member of the LSU Tigers from 2012 to 2013. Bolden transferred again and finished his college football career as a member of the Eastern Michigan Eagles in 2014.

== Recruitment ==
College recruiting
Name	Hometown	School	Height	Weight	40^{‡}	Commit date
Rob Bolden; QB	Orchard Lake, Michigan	St. Mary's Preparatory	6 ft 4 in (1.93 m)	195 lb (88 kg)	4.5	Jul 10, 2009
Rob Bolden; QB	Recruit ratings: Scout: Rivals:					
Overall recruit ranking: Scout: 8 (QB) Rivals: 2 (QB), 3 (MI)
‡ Refers to 40-yard dash; Note: In many cases, Scout, Rivals, 247Sports, On3, and ESPN may conflict in their listings of height, weight and 40 time.; In these cases, the average was taken. ESPN grades are on a 100-point scale.; Sources: "2010 Team Ranking". Rivals.com.

Bolden committed to Penn State University on July 10, 2009. He also had football scholarship offers from the University of Oregon, Michigan State University, Virginia Tech, the University of Wisconsin, and the University of Nebraska–Lincoln, among others.

== College career ==
=== Penn State ===
After arriving on campus in June, Bolden beat out two sophomores, Kevin Newsome and Matt McGloin, and another highly recruited freshman, Paul Jones, to win the starting quarterback job for the first game of the 2010 season against Youngstown State. Bolden became the first true freshman quarterback under head coach Joe Paterno to start the opening game of the season, and the first since Wally Richardson in 1992 to start any game of their freshman season. Bolden was also the first true freshman quarterback at Penn State to start the season since Shorty Miller in 1910. On his decision to name Bolden as the starting quarterback, Paterno said, "He has got an arm, he's got a little poise, he did some things a little better than the other guys on more occasions. There are days I came off the field not knowing who I wanted to play."

Bolden played his first collegiate football game on September 4, 2010, for the Nittany Lions in the season opener against Youngstown State. Despite a shaky beginning, Bolden exhibited an overall solid performance in Penn State's 44–14 rout of Youngstown State, finishing 20–29 for 239 yards passing for two touchdowns and one interception.

Against Alabama, he went 13-for-29 for 144 yards, but two red zone interceptions marred the Nittany Lions' chances in the 24–3 loss. Bolden finished 12-of-27 for 217 yards, one touchdown, and two interceptions in a 24–0 shutout of Kent State. Against Temple, he went 18-for-28 for 223 yards and no touchdowns. Against Iowa, Bolden went 20-of-37 for 212 yards and an interception. Penn State lost the game 24–3 after Bolden threw an interception that went for an opposing touchdown at the end of the game.

Bolden went 8-for-21 for 142 yards, one touchdown, and one interception against Illinois. He threw an 80-yard play-action touchdown pass following his second pick six of the year. Against Minnesota, he rebounded, going 11-for-13 for 130 yards and one touchdown before suffering an injury on an option play. He was pulled from the game with a concussion and was relieved by McGloin, who went 6-for-13 for 76 yards with two touchdowns and one interception in his place. McGloin was named the starting quarterback following three straight wins in Bolden's absence, including the comeback win against Minnesota.

On January 2, 2011, Rob Bolden Sr. announced his son's plans to transfer out of Penn State. On January 3, Bolden and his father met with head coach Paterno and quarterbacks coach Jay Paterno in State College, Pennsylvania, to discuss the transfer. Joe Paterno informed Bolden that he would not grant a release from his scholarship. Bolden decided to then stay at Penn State and not transfer. On January 2, 2012, Bolden started in the place of McGloin, who had been injured in a locker room fight with teammate Curtis Drake, in the TicketCity Bowl against Houston. Bolden and the Nittany Lions struggled and lost 30–14. Bolden completed 7-of-26 passes for 137 yards, one touchdown pass, and three interceptions. He also rushed six times for 16 yards.

In the first depth chart released by new head coach Bill O'Brien after spring practices, Bolden was listed as the third-string quarterback, behind McGloin and Jones. After being released from his scholarship, Bolden took an official visit to LSU on July 29, 2012. Because of the NCAA's sanctions on Penn State in the wake of the Penn State child sex abuse scandal, Bolden was free to transfer to any FBS program without limitation.

=== LSU ===
Bolden announced his decision to transfer to LSU on August 1, 2012. He lost the 2013 backup quarterback job to Anthony Jennings, and was the 4th string QB behind Jennings, Stephen Rivers and Zach Mettenberger. Bolden missed 2013 spring camp due to an injury.

=== Eastern Michigan ===
Bolden did not see the field during the 2013 season and was even changed to a wide receiver in the spring of 2014 before he transferred to Eastern Michigan to finish his college career close to home.

=== Statistics ===
Year	Team	Games			Passing								Rushing			
Year	Team	GP	GS	Record	Cmp	Att	Pct	Yds	Avg	TD	INT	Rtg	Att	Yds	Avg	TD
2010	Penn State	10	8	5–3	112	193	58.0	1,360	7.0	5	7	118.5	30	-11	-0.4	1
2011	Penn State	10	8	6–2	53	135	39.3	685	5.1	2	7	76.4	29	38	1.3	0
2012	LSU	0	0	–	Redshirt (redshirt)											
2013	LSU	0	0	–	Did not play											
2014	Eastern Michigan	6	3	0–3	41	95	43.2	399	4.2	4	5	81.8	57	84	1.5	0
Career		26	19	11–8	206	423	48.7	2,444	5.8	11	19	96.8	116	111	1.0	1

== Professional career ==
Bolden went undrafted in the 2015 NFL draft. After the draft, he accepted an invitation to attend the Detroit Lions rookie mini-camp on a tryout basis. He was not offered a contract at the end of the rookie mini-camp.
