= Paul Jones (American football) =

American football player (born 1992)

Profile
- Position: Quarterback

Personal information
- Born: May 17, 1992 (age 34); Pittsburgh, Pennsylvania
- Listed height: 6 ft 4 in (1.93 m)
- Listed weight: 250 lb (113 kg)

Career information
- High school: Sto-Rox High School, Pittsburgh, PA
- College: Penn State (2010−2012); Robert Morris University (2013)
- Stats at ESPN

Paul Jones (born May 17, 1992) is an American college football quarterback. He played for the Penn State Nittany Lions from 2010 to 2012. He transferred to Robert Morris University and played for the Robert Morris Colonials in 2013.

== Early life ==
Jones grew up in McKees Rocks, PA and attended Sto-Rox School District where he played high school football under Jason Ruscitto.

== Recruiting ==
College recruiting
Name	Hometown	School	Height	Weight	40^{‡}	Commit date
Paul Jones; QB	McKees Rocks, PA	Sto-Rox High School	6 ft 3 in (1.91 m)	226 lb (103 kg)	4.88	Jan 17, 2009
Paul Jones; QB	Recruit ratings: Scout: Rivals:					
Overall recruit ranking:
‡ Refers to 40-yard dash; Note: In many cases, Scout, Rivals, 247Sports, On3, and ESPN may conflict in their listings of height, weight and 40 time.; In these cases, the average was taken. ESPN grades are on a 100-point scale.; Sources: "2010 Team Ranking". Rivals.com.

== College career ==
Jones graduated high school early and enrolled for the spring semester at Penn State in the spring of 2009. During his freshman season in 2010, Jones was a Redshirt and served as the quarterback on Penn State's scout team. While he showed promise and was expected to compete for the quarterback job in 2011, he had academic troubles and was forced to sit out due to ineligibility. He did regain eligibility for the 2012 season. Though he was initially entrenched in a 4-way QB competition with Matt McGloin, Rob Bolden and Shane McGregor, he was moved to tight end and appeared in his first game against Navy, where he caught one pass for seven yards. Jones left the Penn State football team midway through the 2012 season. He transferred from Penn State to Robert Morris University, where he will have two years of eligibility remaining. Jones is projected as the odds on favorite to be the starting quarterback at RMU for the 2013 season. Jones was ruled academically ineligible for the 2014 season.

== Personal ==
Jones is the son of Paul Sr. and Jenifer Jones. He has 4 younger brothers: Malcolm, Jeremiah, Daniel, and Kristifer. He also has a sister, Jena.
