= 2010 Northwestern Wildcats football team =

American college football season

2010 Northwestern Wildcats football

TicketCity Bowl, L 38–45 vs. Texas Tech
- Conference: Big Ten Conference
- Record: 7–6 (3–5 Big Ten Conference)
- Head coach: Pat Fitzgerald (5th season)
- Offensive coordinator: Mick McCall (3rd season)
- Offensive scheme: Spread
- Defensive coordinator: Mike Hankwitz (3rd season)
- Base defense: Multiple 4–3
- Captains: Dan Persa; Al Netter; Quentin Davie; Corbin Bryant
- Home stadium: Ryan Field

2010 Big Ten Conference football standings
| | Conf. | | | Overall |
| Team | W | | L | W | | L |
|---|---|---|---|---|---|---|
| No. 14 Michigan State + | 7 | – | 1 | 11 | – | 2 |
| No. 7 Wisconsin $+ | 7 | – | 1 | 11 | – | 2 |
| Iowa | 4 | – | 4 | 8 | – | 5 |
| Illinois | 4 | – | 4 | 7 | – | 6 |
| Penn State | 4 | – | 4 | 7 | – | 6 |
| Michigan | 3 | – | 5 | 7 | – | 6 |
| Northwestern | 3 | – | 5 | 7 | – | 6 |
| Purdue | 2 | – | 6 | 4 | – | 8 |
| Minnesota | 2 | – | 6 | 3 | – | 9 |
| Indiana | 1 | – | 7 | 5 | – | 7 |
| No. 5 Ohio State† % | 0 | – | 1 | 0 | – | 1 |
$ – BCS representative as conference champion; % – BCS at-large representative; + – Conference co-champions; † – Ohio State (12–1, 7–1) self-vacated all of their wins; Rankings from AP Poll

The 2010 Northwestern Wildcats football team represented Northwestern University in the Big Ten during the 2010 NCAA Division I FBS football season. Pat Fitzgerald, in his fifth season at Northwestern, was the team's head coach. The Wildcats home games were played at Ryan Field in Evanston, Illinois. The annual rivalry game against the University of Illinois was played at Wrigley Field on November 20.

The Wildcats finished the season 7–6, 3–5 in Big Ten play and was invited to the inaugural TicketCity Bowl where they were defeated by Texas Tech 38–45.

== Schedule ==
| Date | Time | Opponent | Site | TV | Result | Attendance |
|---|---|---|---|---|---|---|
| September 4 | 6:30 pm | at Vanderbilt* | Vanderbilt Stadium; Nashville, TN | CSNC | W 23–21 | 37,210 |
| September 11 | 11:00 am | Illinois State* | Ryan Field; Evanston, IL | BTN | W 37–3 | 25,471 |
| September 18 | 6:00 pm | at Rice* | Rice Stadium; Houston, TX | | W 30–13 | 15,562 |
| September 25 | 11:00 am | Central Michigan* | Ryan Field; Evanston, IL | BTN | W 30–25 | 30,075 |
| October 2 | 11:00 am | at Minnesota | TCF Bank Stadium; Minneapolis, MN | ESPN | W 29–28 | 49,228 |
| October 9 | 6:30 pm | Purdue | Ryan Field; Evanston, IL | BTN | L 17–20 | 33,847 |
| October 23 | 11:00 am | No. 8 Michigan State^{†} | Ryan Field; Evanston, IL | ESPN | L 27–35 | 41,115 |
| October 30 | 11:00 am | at Indiana | Memorial Stadium; Bloomington, IN | BTN | W 20–17 | 37,818 |
| November 6 | 2:30 pm | at Penn State | Beaver Stadium; University Park, PA | ABC/ESPN2 | L 21–35 | 104,147 |
| November 13 | 11:00 am | No. 13 Iowa | Ryan Field; Evanston, IL | ESPN | W 21–17 | 47,130 |
| November 20 | 2:30 pm | vs. Illinois | Wrigley Field; Chicago, IL (Land of Lincoln Trophy) (College GameDay) | ESPNU | L 27–48 | 41,058 |
| November 27 | 2:30 pm | at No. 5 Wisconsin | Camp Randall Stadium; Madison, WI | ABC/ESPN | L 23–70 | 80,011 |
| January 1 | 11:00 am | vs. Texas Tech* | Cotton Bowl; Dallas, TX (TicketCity Bowl) | ESPNU | L 38–45 | 40,121 |
*Non-conference game; ^{†}Homecoming; Rankings from AP Poll released prior to the game; All times are in Central time

== Rankings ==
Ranking movements Legend: ██ Increase in ranking ██ Decrease in ranking — = Not ranked RV = Received votes
| | Week | | | | | | | | | | | | | | | |
| Poll | Pre | 1 | 2 | 3 | 4 | 5 | 6 | 7 | 8 | 9 | 10 | 11 | 12 | 13 | 14 | Final |
|---|---|---|---|---|---|---|---|---|---|---|---|---|---|---|---|---|
| AP | — | — | RV | RV | RV | RV | RV | RV | — | RV | — | RV | — | — | — | — |
| Coaches | RV | RV | RV | RV | RV | 25 | RV | RV | RV | RV | — | 25 | RV | — | — | — |
| Harris | Not released | | | | | | RV | RV | RV | RV | RV | RV | RV | — | — | Not released |
| BCS | Not released | | | | | | | — | — | — | — | — | — | — | — | Not released |

== Game summaries ==
=== Vanderbilt ===
| | 1 | 2 | 3 | 4 | Total |
|---|---|---|---|---|---|
| Wildcats | 10 | 0 | 7 | 6 | 23 |
| Commodores | 0 | 9 | 6 | 6 | 21 |

=== Illinois State ===
| | 1 | 2 | 3 | 4 | Total |
|---|---|---|---|---|---|
| Redbirds | 3 | 0 | 0 | 0 | 3 |
| Wildcats | 14 | 16 | 0 | 7 | 37 |

=== Rice ===
| | 1 | 2 | 3 | 4 | Total |
|---|---|---|---|---|---|
| Wildcats | 3 | 10 | 14 | 3 | 30 |
| Owls | 0 | 3 | 3 | 7 | 13 |

=== Central Michigan ===
| | 1 | 2 | 3 | 4 | Total |
|---|---|---|---|---|---|
| Chippewas | 6 | 7 | 0 | 12 | 25 |
| Wildcats | 6 | 7 | 10 | 7 | 30 |

=== Minnesota ===
| | 1 | 2 | 3 | 4 | Total |
|---|---|---|---|---|---|
| Wildcats | 14 | 0 | 6 | 9 | 29 |
| Golden Gophers | 7 | 14 | 0 | 7 | 28 |

=== Purdue ===
| | 1 | 2 | 3 | 4 | Total |
|---|---|---|---|---|---|
| Boilermakers | 0 | 10 | 3 | 7 | 20 |
| #25 Wildcats | 7 | 3 | 7 | 0 | 17 |

=== Michigan State ===
| | 1 | 2 | 3 | 4 | Total |
|---|---|---|---|---|---|
| #8 Spartans | 0 | 7 | 7 | 21 | 35 |
| Wildcats | 7 | 10 | 7 | 3 | 27 |

=== Indiana ===
| | 1 | 2 | 3 | 4 | Total |
|---|---|---|---|---|---|
| Wildcats | 0 | 10 | 7 | 3 | 20 |
| Hoosiers | 3 | 7 | 0 | 7 | 17 |

=== Penn State ===
| | 1 | 2 | 3 | 4 | Total |
|---|---|---|---|---|---|
| Wildcats | 7 | 14 | 0 | 0 | 21 |
| Nittany Lions | 0 | 7 | 21 | 7 | 35 |

=== Iowa ===
| | 1 | 2 | 3 | 4 | Total |
|---|---|---|---|---|---|
| Hawkeyes | 0 | 3 | 14 | 0 | 17 |
| Wildcats | 7 | 0 | 0 | 14 | 21 |

Northwestern won a thriller by scoring two touchdowns in the fourth quarter. The Wildcats led in the first two periods, but the Hawkeyes scored twice to take the lead in the third quarter.

=== Illinois ===
| | 1 | 2 | 3 | 4 | Total |
|---|---|---|---|---|---|
| Fighting Illini | 21 | 6 | 7 | 14 | 48 |
| #25 Wildcats | 14 | 10 | 0 | 3 | 27 |

The Wildcats, one week after upsetting a ranked Iowa team, fell flat in Wrigley Field, losing 48-27 to the Fighting Illini. Illinois RB Mikel LeShoure ran wild on Northwestern's defense for 330 yards on 33 carries (for an average of 10.0 yards per carry), with a pair of touchdowns. The loss snapped a two game Northwestern winning streak over Illinois and sealed a bowl berth for Illinois, regardless of the outcome of their season finale against Fresno State next week. Northwestern falls to 3-4 in Big Ten play and 7-4 overall. The Wildcats face the 10-1 Wisconsin Badgers next week in Camp Randall Stadium, where they have not won since the 2000 season.

=== Wisconsin ===
| | 1 | 2 | 3 | 4 | Total |
|---|---|---|---|---|---|
| Wildcats | 3 | 14 | 6 | 0 | 23 |
| #5 Badgers | 14 | 35 | 21 | 0 | 70 |

=== Texas Tech–TicketCity Bowl ===
| | 1 | 2 | 3 | 4 | Total |
|---|---|---|---|---|---|
| Wildcats | 0 | 6 | 18 | 14 | 38 |
| Red Raiders | 10 | 14 | 14 | 7 | 45 |

== Personnel ==
=== Roster ===
2010 Northwestern Wildcats roster
| Quarterbacks: 7 Dan Persa (C) – Junior; 13 Trevor Siemian – Freshman; 14 Kain Colter – Freshman; 18 Evan Watkins – (redshirt) Freshman; Running backs: 4 Adonis Smith – Freshman; 19 Arby Fields – Sophomore; 20 Scott Concannon – Junior; 25 Stephen Simmons – Senior; 28 Tim Hanrahan – Freshman; 29 Mike Trumpy – (redshirt) Freshman; 34 Tyris Jones – Sophomore; 39 Jacob Schmidt – Junior; Wide receivers: 2 Lee Coleman – Senior; 5 Sidney Stewart – Senior; 6 Charles Brown – Junior; 8 Demetrius Fields – Sophomore; 11 Jeremy Ebert – Junior; 12 Tony Jones – Freshman; 17 Rashad Lawrence – Freshman; 80 Mike Jensen – (redshirt) Freshman; 81 Jimmy Hall – Freshman; 83 Jaleel Reed – (redshirt) Freshman; 84 Drew Moulton – (redshirt) Freshman; 85 Venric Mark – Freshman; 86 Brendan Barber – Sophomore; 88 Torin Dupper – Freshman; Superbacks: 9 Drake Dunsmore – Junior; 40 Brett Nagel – Sophomore; 45 Aaron Nagel - Junior; 47 Christian Flores – Freshman; 82 John Plasencia – (redshirt) Freshman; 89 Josh Rooks – Senior | Offensive line: 52 Evan Luxenburg – Sophomore; 62 Taylor Paxton – (redshirt) Freshman; 63 Keegan Grant – Senior; 64 Doug Bartels – Junior; 65 Ben Burkett – Junior; 66 Brandon Vitabile – Freshman; 68 Hayden Baker – Freshman; 70 Patrick Ward – Sophomore; 72 Brian Mulroe – Sophomore; 73 Colin Armstrong – Junior; 74 Chuck Porcelli – Sophomore; 75 Al Netter (C) – Junior; 76 Brian Smith – (redshirt) Freshman; 78 Paul Jorgensen – Freshman; 79 Neal Deiters – Sophomore; Defensive line: 42 Kevin Watt – Junior; 55 Bo Cisek – Sophomore; 60 Jake Gregus – (redshirt) Freshman; 61 Andrew Struckmeyer – Junior; 67 Sean McEvilly – Freshman; 88 Quentin Williams – Sophomore; 90 Jack DiNardo – Junior; 91 Brian Arnfelt – Sophomore; 92 Will Hampton – Freshman; 93 Niko Mafuli – Junior; 94 Vince Browne – Junior; 95 Davon Custis – (redshirt) Freshman; 96 Anthony Battle – (redshirt) Freshman; 97 Tyler Scott – (redshirt) Freshman; 98 Corbin Bryant (C) – Senior; 99 Chance Carter – Freshman | Linebackers: 31 Stone Pinckney – Sophomore; 33 David Nwabuisi – Sophomore; 35 Ben Johnson – Junior; 41 Quentin Davie (C) – Senior; 43 Tim Riley – (redshirt) Freshman; 44 Nate Williams – Senior; 46 Damien Proby – (redshirt) Freshman; 48 Roderick Goodlow – Sophomore; 50 Timmy Vernon – (redshirt) Freshman; 51 Bryce McNaul – Junior; 53 Chi Chi Ariguzo – Freshman; 54 Collin Ellis – Freshman; 56 Will Studlien – (redshirt) Freshman; 57 Luke Reppe – Freshman; Defensive backs: 15 Daniel Jones – Freshman; 24 Ibraheim Campbell – Freshman; 36 Mike Eshun – Freshman; 39 Joe Cannon – Freshman; Cornerbacks: 3 Jeravin Matthews – Junior; 13 C.J. Bryant – Freshman; 20 Tim Weak – Sophomore; 21 Mike Bolden – Junior; 22 Demetrius Dugar – Sophomore; 26 Jordan Mabin – Junior; 28 Justan Vaughn – Senior; 38 James Kurzawski – Sophomore; 47 Ricky Weina – Junior; Safeties: 7 Hunter Bates – Sophomore; 10 Brian Peters – Junior; 16 Davion Fleming – (redshirt) Freshman; 27 Jared Carpenter – Sophomore; 32 David Arnold – Junior; 49 Scott Lilja – Senior | Punters: 1 Stefan Demos – Senior; 49 Brandon Williams – (redshirt) Freshman; Kickers: 1 Stefan Demos – Senior; 34 Steve Flaherty – Sophomore; 37 Jeff Budzien – (redshirt) Freshman; Long snappers: 58 John Henry Pace – Senior; 59 Pat Hickey – (redshirt) Freshman; Head coach: Pat Fitzgerald; Coordinators/assistant coaches: Randy Bates – Linebackers coach; Jerry brown – Assistant head coach/defensive backs coach; Adam Cushing – Offensive line coach/recruiting coach; Mike Hankwitz – Defensive coordinator/safeties coach; Bob heffner – Superbacks coach; Kevin johns – Wide receivers coach/passing game coach; Marty long – Defensive line coach; Matt macpherson – Running backs coach; Mick mccall – Offensive coordinator/QB's coach; Legend: (C) Team captain; Redshirt |

=== Depth chart ===
Defense

FS
Brian Peters
Hunter Bates
⋅

| WLB | MLB | SLB |
|---|---|---|
| ⋅ | Nate Williams | ⋅ |
| Damien Proby | David Nwabuisi | ⋅ |
| ⋅ | ⋅ | ⋅ |

SS
Jared Carpenter
David Arnold
⋅

CB
Jordan Mabin
Demetrius Dugar
⋅

| DE | DT | DT | DE |
|---|---|---|---|
| Vince Browne | Jack DiNardo | Corbin Bryant | Kevin Watt |
| Tyler Scott | Brian Arnfelt | Niko Mafuli | Quentin Williams |
| ⋅ | ⋅ | ⋅ | ⋅ |

CB
Justan Vaughn
Mike Bolden
⋅

Offense

Z-Receiver
Sidney Stewart
Rashad Lawrence
⋅

Y-Receiver
Jeremy Ebert
Charles Brown
⋅

| LT | LG | C | RG | RT |
|---|---|---|---|---|
| Al Netter | Brian Mulroe | Ben Burkett | Keegan Grant | Patrick Ward |
| Chuck Porcelli | Doug Bartels | Colin Armstrong | Brian Smith | Neal Deiters |
| ⋅ | ⋅ | ⋅ | ⋅ | ⋅ |

Superback
Drake Dunsmore
Josh Rooks
⋅

X-Receiver
Demetrius Fields
Tony Jones
⋅

QB
Dan Persa
Evan Watkins
Kain Colter

RB
Adonis Smith
Stephen Simmons
Mike Trumpy

Special teams
PK Stefan Demos
PK Jeff Budzien
P Brandon Williams
P Stefan Demos
KR Venric Mark
PR Venric Mark
LS John Henry Pace
H Brandon Williams
