= 2010 Indiana Hoosiers football team =

American college football season

2010 Indiana Hoosiers football
- Conference: Big Ten Conference
- Record: 5–7 (1–7 Big Ten)
- Head coach: Bill Lynch (4th season)
- Offensive coordinator: Matt Canada (4th season)
- Offensive scheme: Spread, pistol
- Co-defensive coordinators: Brian George (6th season); Joe Palcic (6th season)
- Base defense: 4–3
- MVP: Ben Chappell
- Captains: Ben Chappell; Tyler Replogle
- Home stadium: Memorial Stadium

2010 Big Ten Conference football standings
| | Conf. | | | Overall |
| Team | W | | L | W | | L |
|---|---|---|---|---|---|---|
| No. 14 Michigan State + | 7 | – | 1 | 11 | – | 2 |
| No. 7 Wisconsin $+ | 7 | – | 1 | 11 | – | 2 |
| Iowa | 4 | – | 4 | 8 | – | 5 |
| Illinois | 4 | – | 4 | 7 | – | 6 |
| Penn State | 4 | – | 4 | 7 | – | 6 |
| Michigan | 3 | – | 5 | 7 | – | 6 |
| Northwestern | 3 | – | 5 | 7 | – | 6 |
| Purdue | 2 | – | 6 | 4 | – | 8 |
| Minnesota | 2 | – | 6 | 3 | – | 9 |
| Indiana | 1 | – | 7 | 5 | – | 7 |
| No. 5 Ohio State† % | 0 | – | 1 | 0 | – | 1 |
$ – BCS representative as conference champion; % – BCS at-large representative; + – Conference co-champions; † – Ohio State (12–1, 7–1) self-vacated all of their wins; Rankings from AP Poll

The 2010 Indiana Hoosiers football team represented Indiana University Bloomington during the 2010 NCAA Division I FBS football season. As members of the Big Ten Conference, the Hoosiers were led by head coach Bill Lynch and played their home games at Memorial Stadium in Bloomington, Indiana. They finished the season 5–7, 1–7 in Big Ten play. Lynch was fired November 28, 2010, despite having won the team's last game of the season against rival Purdue the previous day.

== Schedule ==
| Date | Time | Opponent | Site | TV | Result | Attendance |
|---|---|---|---|---|---|---|
| September 2 | 7:30 pm | Towson* | Memorial Stadium; Bloomington, IN | BTN | W 51–17 | 35,242 |
| September 18 | 5:00 pm | at Western Kentucky* | Houchens Industries–L. T. Smith Stadium; Bowling Green, KY | BTN | W 38–21 | 20,772 |
| September 25 | 7:00 pm | Akron* | Memorial Stadium; Bloomington, IN | BTN | W 35–20 | 42,258 |
| October 2 | 3:30 pm | No. 19 Michigan | Memorial Stadium; Bloomington, IN | ESPNU | L 35–42 | 52,929 |
| October 9 | 12:00 pm | at No. 2 Ohio State | Ohio Stadium; Columbus, OH | ESPN | L 10–38 | 105,291 |
| October 16 | 12:00 pm | Arkansas State*^{†} | Memorial Stadium; Bloomington, IN | ESPNU | W 36–34 | 40,480 |
| October 23 | 12:00 pm | at Illinois | Memorial Stadium; Champaign, IL (rivalry) | BTN | L 13–43 | 53,550 |
| October 30 | 12:00 pm | Northwestern | Memorial Stadium; Bloomington, IN | BTN | L 17–20 | 37,818 |
| November 6 | 12:00 pm | No. 15 Iowa | Memorial Stadium; Bloomington, IN | BTN | L 13–18 | 42,991 |
| November 13 | 12:00 pm | at No. 5 Wisconsin | Camp Randall Stadium; Madison, WI | ESPN2 | L 20–83 | 80,477 |
| November 20 | 12:00 pm | vs. Penn State | FedExField; Landover, MD | BTN | L 24–41 | 78,790 |
| November 27 | 12:00 pm | at Purdue | Ross–Ade Stadium; West Lafayette, IN (Old Oaken Bucket) | BTN | W 34–31 ^{OT} | 50,136 |
*Non-conference game; ^{†}Homecoming; Rankings from Coaches' Poll released prior to the game; All times are in Eastern time

== Game summaries ==
=== Towson ===
Towson at Indiana

| Team | 1 | 2 | 3 | 4 | Total |
|---|---|---|---|---|---|
| Towson | 0 | 14 | 0 | 3 | 17 |
| • Indiana | 17 | 21 | 10 | 3 | 51 |

- Date: September 2
- Location: Memorial Stadium
  Bloomington, Indiana
- Game start: 7:31 p.m. EDT
- Elapsed time: 3:09
- Game attendance: 35,242
- Game weather: Partly Cloudy, 83 °F (28 °C), Wind: SSW 8 mph (13 km/h)
- Referee: Mike Conlin
- TV announcers (BTN): Matt Devlin (Play-by-play), Derek Rackley (Color) & Stacy Paetz (Sideline)

=== Western Kentucky ===
Indiana at Western Kentucky

| Team | 1 | 2 | 3 | 4 | Total |
|---|---|---|---|---|---|
| • Indiana | 0 | 17 | 14 | 7 | 38 |
| Western Kentucky | 7 | 0 | 0 | 14 | 21 |

- Date: September 18
- Location: Houchens Industries–L. T. Smith Stadium
  Bowling Green, Kentucky
- Game start: 5:00 p.m. EDT
- Elapsed time: 3:17
- Game attendance: 20,772
- Game weather: Clear, 86 °F (30 °C), Wind: NE 5 mph (8.0 km/h)
- Referee: Charles Lewis
- TV announcers (BTN): Matt Devlin (Play-by-play), Derek Rackley (Color) & Stacy Paetz (Sideline)

=== Akron ===
Akron at Indiana

| Team | 1 | 2 | 3 | 4 | Total |
|---|---|---|---|---|---|
| Akron | 3 | 10 | 0 | 7 | 20 |
| • Indiana | 14 | 14 | 7 | 0 | 35 |

- Date: September 25
- Location: Memorial Stadium
  Bloomington, Indiana
- Game start: 7:06 p.m. EDT
- Elapsed time: 2:49
- Game attendance: 42,258
- Referee: Alex Kemp
- TV announcers (BTN): Craig Coshun (Play-by-play), Rosevelt Colvin (Color) & Larra Overton (Sideline)

=== Michigan ===
#19 Michigan at Indiana

| Team | 1 | 2 | 3 | 4 | Total |
|---|---|---|---|---|---|
| • #19 Michigan | 14 | 7 | 14 | 7 | 42 |
| Indiana | 7 | 14 | 7 | 7 | 35 |

- Date: October 2
- Location: Memorial Stadium
  Bloomington, Indiana
- Game start: 3:35 p.m. EDT
- Elapsed time: 3:16
- Game attendance: 52,929
- Referee: Dan Capron
- TV announcers (ESPNU): Pam Ward (Play-by-play) & Danny Kanell (Color)

=== Ohio State ===
Indiana at #2 Ohio State

| Team | 1 | 2 | 3 | 4 | Total |
|---|---|---|---|---|---|
| Indiana | 0 | 0 | 3 | 7 | 10 |
| • #2 Ohio State | 14 | 17 | 7 | 0 | 38 |

- Date: October 9
- Location: Ohio Stadium
  Columbus, Ohio
- Game start: 12:02 p.m. EDT
- Elapsed time: 3:07
- Game attendance: 105,291
- Game weather: Clear, 70 °F (21 °C), Wind: W 1 mph (1.6 km/h)
- Referee: Todd Geerlings
- TV announcers (ESPN): Dave Pasch (Play-by-play), Bob Griese (Color) & Chris Spielman (Color)

=== Arkansas State ===
Arkansas State at Indiana

| Team | 1 | 2 | 3 | 4 | Total |
|---|---|---|---|---|---|
| Arkansas State | 7 | 7 | 0 | 20 | 34 |
| • Indiana | 3 | 9 | 7 | 17 | 36 |

- Date: October 16
- Location: Memorial Stadium
  Bloomington, Indiana
- Game start: 12:01 p.m. EDT
- Elapsed time: 3:32
- Game attendance: 40,480
- Game weather: Clear, 59 °F (15 °C), Wind: SW 6 mph (9.7 km/h)
- Referee: Dennis Lipski
- TV announcers (ESPNU): Rob Stone (Play-by-play) & David Pollack (Color)

=== Illinois ===
Indiana at Illinois

| Team | 1 | 2 | 3 | 4 | Total |
|---|---|---|---|---|---|
| Indiana | 7 | 3 | 3 | 0 | 13 |
| • Illinois | 10 | 17 | 2 | 14 | 43 |

- Date: October 23
- Location: Memorial Stadium
  Champaign, Illinois
- Game start: 12:01 p.m. EDT
- Elapsed time: 3:18
- Game attendance: 53,550
- Game weather: Cloudy, 66 °F (19 °C), Wind: SSE 8 mph (13 km/h)
- Referee: Scott McElwee
- TV announcers (BTN): Tom Hart (Play-by-play), Anthony Herron (Color) & Lisa Byington (Sideline)

=== Northwestern ===
Northwestern at Indiana

| Team | 1 | 2 | 3 | 4 | Total |
|---|---|---|---|---|---|
| • Northwestern | 0 | 10 | 7 | 3 | 20 |
| Indiana | 3 | 7 | 0 | 7 | 17 |

- Date: October 30
- Location: Memorial Stadium
  Bloomington, Indiana
- Game start: 12:01 p.m. EDT
- Elapsed time: 3:24
- Game attendance: 37,818
- Game weather: Clear, 51 °F (11 °C), Wind: SSW 13 mph (21 km/h)
- Referee: Bill LeMonnier
- TV announcers (BTN): Eric Collins (Play-by-play), Chris Martin (Color) & Charissa Thompson (Sideline)

=== Iowa ===
#15 Iowa at Indiana

| Team | 1 | 2 | 3 | 4 | Total |
|---|---|---|---|---|---|
| • #15 Iowa | 3 | 3 | 3 | 9 | 18 |
| Indiana | 3 | 3 | 7 | 0 | 13 |

- Date: November 6
- Location: Memorial Stadium
  Bloomington, Indiana
- Game start: 12:02 p.m. EDT
- Elapsed time: 3:05
- Game attendance: 42,991
- Game weather: Clear, 39 °F (4 °C), Wind: N 4 mph (6.4 km/h)
- Referee: John O'Neill
- TV announcers (BTN): Tom Werme (Play-by-play), Derek Rackley (Color) & Stacy Paetz (Sideline)

=== Wisconsin ===
Indiana at #5 Wisconsin

| Team | 1 | 2 | 3 | 4 | Total |
|---|---|---|---|---|---|
| Indiana | 7 | 3 | 3 | 7 | 20 |
| • #5 Wisconsin | 10 | 28 | 21 | 24 | 83 |

- Date: November 13
- Location: Camp Randall Stadium
  Madison, Wisconsin
- Game start: 12:01 p.m. EST
- Elapsed time: 3:04
- Game attendance: 80,477
- Game weather: Light Rain, 48 °F (9 °C), Wind: E 8 mph (13 km/h)
- Referee: Scott McElwee
- TV announcers (ESPN2): Bob Wischusen (Play-by-play), Brian Griese (Color) & Quint Kessenich (Sideline)

=== Penn State ===
Indiana at Penn State

| Team | 1 | 2 | 3 | 4 | Total |
|---|---|---|---|---|---|
| Indiana | 0 | 14 | 10 | 0 | 24 |
| • Penn State | 7 | 10 | 14 | 10 | 41 |

- Date: November 20
- Location: FedExField
  Landover, Maryland
- Game start: 12:01 p.m. EST
- Elapsed time: 3:22
- Game attendance: 78,790
- Referee: Dave Witvoet
- TV announcers (BTN): Tom Hart (Play-by-play), Anthony Herron (Color) & Lisa Byington (Sideline)

=== Purdue ===
Indiana at Purdue

| Team | 1 | 2 | 3 | 4 | OT | Total |
|---|---|---|---|---|---|---|
| • Indiana | 7 | 7 | 7 | 10 | 3 | 34 |
| Purdue | 14 | 7 | 7 | 3 | 0 | 31 |

- Date: November 27
- Location: Ross–Ade Stadium
  West Lafayette, Indiana
- Game start: 12:00 p.m. EST
- Elapsed time: 3:38
- Game attendance: 50,136
- Game weather: Sunny, 32 °F (0 °C), Wind: W 10 mph (16 km/h)
- Referee: Bill LeMonnier
- TV announcers (BTN): Tom Hart (Play-by-play), Anthony Herron (Color) & Lisa Byington (Sideline)

Scoring summary
| 1 | 8:26 | Purdue | Antavian Edison 55 yard pass from Rob Henry (Carson Wiggs kick) | Purdue 7–0 |
| 1 | 6:04 | Indiana | Trea Burgess 1 yard run (Mitch Ewald kick) | Tie 7–7 |
| 1 | 1:10 | Purdue | Dan Dierking 2 yard pass from Rob Henry (Carson Wiggs kick) | Purdue 14–7 |
| 2 | 6:20 | Purdue | Keith Carlos 1 yard run (Carson Wiggs kick) | Purdue 21–7 |
| 2 | 2:14 | Indiana | Tandon Doss 4 yard pass from Ben Chappell (Mitch Ewald kick) | Purdue 21–14 |
| 3 | 9:55 | Indiana | Tandon Doss 6 yard pass from Ben Chappell (Mitch Ewald kick) | Tie 21–21 |
| 3 | 5:21 | Purdue | Cortez Smith 52 yard pass from Rob Henry (Carson Wiggs kick) | Purdue 28–21 |
| 4 | 13:05 | Indiana | Tandon Doss 3 yard pass from Ben Chappell (Mitch Ewald kick) | Tie 28–28 |
| 4 | 5:41 | Purdue | Carson Wiggs 36 yard field goal | Purdue 31–28 |
| 4 | 0:09 | Indiana | Mitch Ewald 26 yard field goal | Tie 31–31 |
| OT | | Indiana | Mitch Ewald 31 yard field goal | Indiana 34–31 |

Notes

- Indiana beat Purdue in West Lafayette for the first time since 1996.
- Indiana snaps a 12-game Big Ten losing streak and a 15-game conference road losing streak.
- Ben Chappell breaks the single-season school record for passing yardage with 3,295 (3,043 – Kellen Lewis, 2007).

== 2011 NFL draftees ==
| Player | Round | Pick | Position | NFL club |
|---|---|---|---|---|
| James Brewer | 4 | 20 | Offensive tackle | New York Giants |
| Tandon Doss | 4 | 26 | Wide receiver | Baltimore Ravens |
