= 2010 Purdue Boilermakers football team =

American college football season

2010 Purdue Boilermakers football
- Conference: Big Ten Conference
- Record: 4–8 (2–6 Big Ten)
- Head coach: Danny Hope (2nd season)
- Offensive coordinator: Gary Nord (2nd season)
- Offensive scheme: Spread
- Defensive coordinator: Gary Emanuel (1st season)
- Base defense: 4–3
- Captain: 6: Kyle Adams; Dan Dierking; Keith Smith; Gerald Gooden Jr.; Ryan Kerrigan; Jason Werner
- Home stadium: Ross–Ade Stadium

2010 Big Ten Conference football standings
	Conf.			Overall
Team	W		L	W		L
No. 14 Michigan State +	7	–	1	11	–	2
No. 7 Wisconsin $+	7	–	1	11	–	2
Iowa	4	–	4	8	–	5
Illinois	4	–	4	7	–	6
Penn State	4	–	4	7	–	6
Michigan	3	–	5	7	–	6
Northwestern	3	–	5	7	–	6
Purdue	2	–	6	4	–	8
Minnesota	2	–	6	3	–	9
Indiana	1	–	7	5	–	7
No. 5 Ohio State† %	0	–	1	0	–	1
$ – BCS representative as conference champion; % – BCS at-large representative; + – Conference co-champions; † – Ohio State (12–1, 7–1) self-vacated all of their wins; Rankings from AP Poll

The 2010 Purdue Boilermakers football team represented Purdue University in the 2010 NCAA Division I FBS football season. They played their home games at Ross–Ade Stadium in West Lafayette, Indiana and competed in the Big Ten Conference. It was Danny Hope's second season as head coach. The Boilermakers finished the season 4–8, 2–6 in Big Ten play.

== Before the season ==
The Boilermakers were looking to improve on a 5–7 record (4–4 in conference play) in 2009, in which they finished 7th in the Big Ten conference. The offense will be led by Robert Marve, the highly rated transfer from Miami (FL), who was named the starting quarterback. They also planned on using Rob Henry at the quarterback position. The running backs were going to be led by Ralph Bolden, who nearly had a 1,000 yard season in 2009, but tore his ACL and missed the 2010 season. The receiving core returns its 2009 leader in receptions, yards and touchdowns, Keith Smith, as well as Antavian Edison who saw significant playing time during the 2009 season as a true freshman. On the defense, the linemen will be led by Ryan Kerrigan, who was selected as a Phil Steele preseason 1st Team All-Big Ten, the team's top returning sack man. The linebacking group returns all three starters from a season ago, which includes Dwayne Beckford and Joe Holland. The secondary will be breaking a whole new group of starters led by junior Albert Evans. The Boilermakers are looking to return to a bowl game for the first time since 2007.

=== Recruiting ===
College recruiting information
Name	Hometown	School	Height	Weight	40^{‡}	Commit date
Ricardo Allen; CB	Daytona Beach, Florida	Mainland High School	5 ft 9 in (1.75 m)	170 lb (77 kg)	4.5	Oct 29, 2009
Ricardo Allen; CB	Recruit ratings: Scout: Rivals: (76)					
Chevin Davis; WR	Daytona Beach, Florida	Mainland High School	6 ft 0 in (1.83 m)	175 lb (79 kg)	4.5	Nov 2, 2009
Chevin Davis; WR	Recruit ratings: Scout: Rivals: (76)					
Josh Davis; DT	Plain City, Ohio	Jonathan Alder High School	6 ft 6 in (1.98 m)	270 lb (120 kg)	5.4	Jul 13, 2010
Josh Davis; DT	Recruit ratings: Scout: Rivals: (75)					
Jack DeBoef; OL	State College, Pennsylvania	State College Area High School	6 ft 8 in (2.03 m)	265 lb (120 kg)	5.4	Dec 9, 2009
Jack DeBoef; OL	Recruit ratings: Scout: Rivals: (78)					
Michael Eargle; CB	Elizabeth, New Jersey	Lackawanna College	6 ft 0 in (1.83 m)	165 lb (75 kg)	4.5	Dec 9, 2009
Michael Eargle; CB	Recruit ratings: Scout: Rivals: (–)					
De'Ron Flood; TE	O'Fallon, Illinois	O'Fallon Township High School	6 ft 4 in (1.93 m)	230 lb (100 kg)	4.7	Jun 27, 2009
De'Ron Flood; TE	Recruit ratings: Scout: Rivals: (74)					
Rashad Frazier; DE	Middletown, Ohio	Middletown High School	6 ft 6 in (1.98 m)	225 lb (102 kg)	4.8	Feb 1, 2009
Rashad Frazier; DE	Recruit ratings: Scout: Rivals: (40)					
Bruce Gaston Jr. DT	Chicago, Illinois	St. Rita of Cascia High School	6 ft 2 in (1.88 m)	290 lb (130 kg)	5.2	Jan 26, 2010
Bruce Gaston Jr. DT	Recruit ratings: Scout: Rivals: (76)					
Joe Gilliam; LB	Indianapolis, Indiana	Southport High School	6 ft 3 in (1.91 m)	205 lb (93 kg)	4.6	Aug 7, 2009
Joe Gilliam; LB	Recruit ratings: Scout: Rivals: (77)					
Normando Harris; DB	Miami, Florida	Monsignor Pace High School	6 ft 0 in (1.83 m)	172 lb (78 kg)	–	Jan 25, 2010
Normando Harris; DB	Recruit ratings: Scout: Rivals: (40)					
Ryan Isaac; DT	Michigan City, Indiana	Michigan City High School	6 ft 4 in (1.93 m)	255 lb (116 kg)	4.8	Jun 27, 2009
Ryan Isaac; DT	Recruit ratings: Scout: Rivals: (76)					
E.J. Johnson; S	Cocoa, Florida	Cocoa High School	6 ft 1 in (1.85 m)	175 lb (79 kg)	4.5	Jul 27, 2009
E.J. Johnson; S	Recruit ratings: Scout: Rivals: (73)					
Mike Lee; LB	Pittsburgh, Pennsylvania	Woodland Hills High School	6 ft 3 in (1.91 m)	205 lb (93 kg)	–	Aug 8, 2009
Mike Lee; LB	Recruit ratings: Scout: Rivals: (78)					
Antonio Lewis; CB	Maywood, Illinois	Proviso East High School	5 ft 10 in (1.78 m)	175 lb (79 kg)	4.5	Dec 6, 2009
Antonio Lewis; CB	Recruit ratings: Scout: Rivals: (76)					
Jonathan Linkenheimer; K	Daytona Beach, Florida	Mainland High School	6 ft 2 in (1.88 m)	195 lb (88 kg)	–	Jan 22, 2009
Jonathan Linkenheimer; K	Recruit ratings: Scout: Rivals: (40)					
Will Lucas; LB	Lakeland, Florida	Lakeland High School	6 ft 1 in (1.85 m)	215 lb (98 kg)	4.7	Jul 23, 2009
Will Lucas; LB	Recruit ratings: Scout: Rivals: (75)					
Reggie Pegram; RB	Dallas, Texas	James Madison High School	6 ft 0 in (1.83 m)	211 lb (96 kg)	4.5	Oct 20, 2009
Reggie Pegram; RB	Recruit ratings: Scout: Rivals: (73)					
Sean Robinson; QB	Rochester, Illinois	Rochester High School	6 ft 5 in (1.96 m)	205 lb (93 kg)	4.55	Jul 6, 2009
Sean Robinson; QB	Recruit ratings: Scout: Rivals: (78)					
O.J. Ross; WR	Daytona Beach, Florida	Mainland High School	5 ft 10 in (1.78 m)	175 lb (79 kg)	4.4	Nov 3, 2009
O.J. Ross; WR	Recruit ratings: Scout: Rivals: (80)					
Ryan Russell; DE	Carrollton, Texas	Creekview High School	6 ft 4 in (1.93 m)	230 lb (100 kg)	–	Feb 2, 2010
Ryan Russell; DE	Recruit ratings: Scout: Rivals: (40)					
Jesse Schmitt; OL	Louisville, Kentucky	Trinity High School	6 ft 2 in (1.88 m)	255 lb (116 kg)	–	Aug 9, 2009
Jesse Schmitt; OL	Recruit ratings: Scout: Rivals: (69)					
Justin Sinz; TE	Edgar, Wisconsin	Edgar High School	6 ft 4 in (1.93 m)	215 lb (98 kg)	–	Dec 6, 2009
Justin Sinz; TE	Recruit ratings: Scout: Rivals: (76)					
Charles Torwudzo; WR	Brownsburg, Indiana	Brownsburg High School	6 ft 5 in (1.96 m)	195 lb (88 kg)	–	Jun 22, 2009
Charles Torwudzo; WR	Recruit ratings: Scout: Rivals: (74)					
Cody Webster; K	Harrisburg, Pennsylvania	Central Dauphin High School	6 ft 2 in (1.88 m)	180 lb (82 kg)	–	Oct 4, 2009
Cody Webster; K	Recruit ratings: Scout: Rivals: (73)					
Overall recruit ranking: Scout: 49 Rivals: – ESPN: –
Note: In many cases, Scout, Rivals, 247Sports, On3, and ESPN may conflict in their listings of height and weight.; In these cases, the average was taken. ESPN grades are on a 100-point scale.; Sources: "Purdue Football Commitments". Rivals.; "2010 Purdue Football Commits". Scout.; "ESPN". ESPN.; "Scout.com Team Recruiting Rankings". Scout.; "2010 Team Ranking". Rivals.com.

== Schedule ==
Date	Time	Opponent	Site	TV	Result	Attendance
September 4	3:30 pm	at Notre Dame*	Notre Dame Stadium; Notre Dame, IN (Battle for the Shillelagh Trophy)	NBC	L 12–23	80,795
September 11	12:00 pm	Western Illinois (FCS)*	Ross–Ade Stadium; West Lafayette, IN	BTN	W 31–21	47,301
September 18	12:00 pm	Ball State*	Ross–Ade Stadium; West Lafayette, IN	BTN	W 24–13	54,124
September 25	12:00 pm	Toledo*	Ross–Ade Stadium; West Lafayette, IN	BTN	L 20–31	42,068
October 9	7:30 pm	at Northwestern	Ryan Field; Evanston, IL	BTN	W 20–17	33,847
October 16	12:00 pm	Minnesota^{†}	Ross–Ade Stadium; West Lafayette, IN	ESPN2	W 28–17	47,319
October 23	12:00 pm	at No. 11 Ohio State	Ohio Stadium; Columbus, OH	BTN	L 0–49	105,387
October 30	12:00 pm	at Illinois	Memorial Stadium; Champaign, IL (Battle for the Purdue Cannon)	ESPN2	L 10–44	50,371
November 6	12:00 pm	No. 7 Wisconsin	Ross–Ade Stadium; West Lafayette, IN	BTN	L 13–34	45,227
November 13	12:00 pm	Michigan	Ross–Ade Stadium; West Lafayette, IN	BTN	L 16–27	50,268
November 20	12:00 pm	at No. 11 Michigan State	Spartan Stadium; East Lansing, MI	BTN	L 31–35	71,111
November 27	12:00 pm	Indiana	Ross–Ade Stadium; West Lafayette, IN (Old Oaken Bucket Game)	BTN	L 31–34 ^{OT}	50,136
*Non-conference game; ^{†}Homecoming; Rankings from AP Poll released prior to the game; All times are in Eastern time

== Game summaries ==
=== At Notre Dame ===
Shillelagh Trophy: Purdue Boilermakers (0–0) at Notre Dame Fighting Irish (0–0)

Quarter	1	2	3	4	Total
Purdue	0	3	0	9	12
Notre Dame	7	6	7	3	23

at Notre Dame Stadium • South Bend, Indiana

- Date: September 4
- Game time: 3:30 p.m.
- Game weather: Partly sunny • 64 °F (18 °C) • Wind NW 16 miles per hour (26 km/h; 14 kn)
- Game attendance: 80,795
- Referee: Dave Witovet
- TV announcers (NBC): Tom Hammond and Mike Mayock
- Box Score

Game information

Purdue

- Robert Marve
  31/42, 220 Yds, 2 INT
- Dan Dierking
  9 Rush, 56 Yds
- Keith Smith
  12 Rec, 80 Yds

Notre Dame

- Dayne Crist
  19/26, 205 Yds, TD
- Armando Allen
  18 Rush, 93 Yds, TD
- Michael Floyd
  5 Rec, 82 Yds

Scoring summary

Quarter	Time	Drive			Team	Scoring information	Score	
Quarter	Time	Plays	Yards	TOP	Team	Scoring information	PUR	ND
1	2:01	7	84	2:26	Notre Dame	Armando Allen 22-yard touchdown run, David Ruffer kick good	0	7
2	11:09	8	50	2:53	Notre Dame	22-yard field goal by David Ruffer	0	10
2	3:50	15	79	7:19	Purdue	25-yard field goal by Carson Wiggs	3	10
2	0:43	9	45	3:07	Notre Dame	46-yard field goal by David Ruffer	3	13
3	10:20	5	30	2:12	Notre Dame	TJ Jones 5-yard touchdown reception from Dayne Crist, David Ruffer kick good	3	20
4	14:48				Purdue	Armando Allen tackled in end zone for a safety by Ryan Kerrigan, Charlton Williams	5	20
4	11:55	7	55	2:53	Purdue	Robert Marve 23-yard touchdown run, Carson Wiggs kick good	12	20
4	4:30	10	39	3:47	Notre Dame	37-yard field goal by David Ruffer	12	23
"TOP" = time of possession. For other American football terms, see Glossary of American football.							12	23

=== Vs. Western Illinois ===
	1	2	3	4	Total
Leathernecks	7	0	0	14	21
Boilermakers	7	10	7	7	31

=== Vs. Ball State ===
Band Day and Family Day

	1	2	3	4	Total
Cardinals	0	0	6	7	13
Boilermakers	14	0	0	10	24

=== Vs. Toledo ===
	1	2	3	4	Total
Rockets	14	3	7	7	31
Boilermakers	0	0	17	3	20

=== At Northwestern ===
Homecoming and 2001 Rose Bowl Throwback Game

Minnesota at Purdue

Team	1	2	3	4	Total
Minnesota	0	0	3	14	17
• Purdue	7	7	7	7	28

- Date: October 16
- Location: Ross–Ade Stadium, West Lafayette, Indiana
- Television network: ESPN2
- Source: ESPN

Scoring summary
1	5:58	PUR	Rob Henry 4 yard run (Carson Wiggs kick)	PUR 7–0
2	8:04	PUR	Rob Henry 1 yard run (Carson Wiggs kick)	PUR 14–0
3	8:42	PUR	Antavian Edison 20 yard pass from Rob Henry (Carson Wiggs kick)	PUR 21–0
3	5:00	MINN	Eric Ellestad 35 yard field goal	PUR 21–3
4	12:17	MINN	Bryant Allen 11 yard pass from Adam Weber (pass failed)	PUR 21–9
4	7:09	PUR	Rob Henry 3 yard run (Carson Wiggs kick)	PUR 28–9
4	3:00	MINN	Da'Jon McKnight 31 yard pass from Adam Weber (Adam Weber to MarQueis Gray pass)	PUR 28–17

=== At Ohio State ===
	1	2	3	4	Total
Boilermakers	0	0	0	0	0
#10 Buckeyes	14	28	0	7	49

=== At Illinois ===
	1	2	3	4	Total
Boilermakers	0	0	0	10	10
Fighting Illini	14	3	20	7	44

=== Vs. Wisconsin ===
#7 Wisconsin at Purdue

Team	1	2	3	4	Total
• #7 Wisconsin	0	6	14	14	34
Purdue	7	3	0	3	13

- Date: November 6
- Location: Ross–Ade Stadium
  West Lafayette, IN
- Game start: 11:00 a.m. CST
- Elapsed time: 3:04
- Game attendance: 45,227
- Game weather: Clear, 38°, Wind: WNW 6

=== Vs. Michigan ===
Michigan at Purdue

Team	1	2	3	4	Total
• Michigan	14	0	6	7	27
Purdue	3	10	3	0	16

- Date: November 13
- Location: Ross–Ade Stadium
  West Lafayette, IN
- Game start: 12:01 p.m. EST
- Elapsed time: 2:59
- Game attendance: 50,268

=== At Michigan State ===
Purdue at #11 Michigan State

Team	1	2	3	4	Total
Purdue	14	7	7	3	31
• #11 Michigan State	7	6	0	22	35

- Date: November 20
- Location: Spartan Stadium
  East Lansing, MI
- Game start: 12:01 p.m. EST
- Elapsed time: 3:14
- Game attendance: 71,111
- Game weather: Partly Cloudy, 39°, Wind: NNW 6

=== Vs. Indiana ===
	1	2	3	4	OT	Total
Hoosiers	7	7	7	10	3	34
Boilermakers	14	7	7	3	0	31

== Roster ==
2010 Purdue Boilermakers football team roster
Players
Coaches
Offense

Pos.	#	Name	Class
RB	1	Keith Carlos	Sr
WR	2	Justin Siller	Jr
WR	3	Waynelle Gravesande	Jr
WR	4	O. J. Ross	Fr
RB	5	Al-Terek McBurse	So
WR	6	Gary Bush	Fr
WR	7	Cortez Smith	Sr
WR	8	Keith Smith	Sr
QB	9	Robert Marve	Jr
QB	10	Sean Robinson	Fr
WR	12	Tommie Thomas	So
WR	13	Antavian Edison	So
QB	15	Rob Henry	Fr
TE	16	Jeff Panfil	Sr
WR	17	Charles Torwudzo	Fr
QB	17	Spencer Dawson	Jr
QB	19	Caleb TerBush	So
RB	20	Gavin Roberts	So
RB	21	Javeare White	Sr
RB	22	Sean Matti	Jr
RB	23	Ralph Bolden	Jr
FB	25	Dan Dierking	Sr
WR	26	Zack Sigman	So
WR	27	T. J. Barbarette	So
RB	33	Reggie Pegram	Fr
FB	40	Derek Jackson	So
FB	46	Kurt Freytag	Fr
FB	48	Jared Crank	Jr
C	52	Henry Lorenzen	Fr
G	53	Dan Barry	Jr
OT	54	Jack De Boef	Fr
C	59	Cody Davis	Fr
OT	62	Nick Mondek	Jr
G	63	James Shepherd	Jr
C	65	Austen Moret	Jr
C	67	Peters Drey	So
OT	68	Dennis Kelly	Jr
G	72	Justin Pierce	Sr
G	73	Ken Plue	Jr
G	74	Connor Snapp	Fr
OT	75	Josh Davis	Fr
C, G	76	Rick Schmeig	So
OT	77	Ryan Prater	Sr
OT	78	Trevor Foy	Fr
TE	82	Crosby Wright	So
WR	83	Kurt Lichtenberg	Jr
TE	84	Justin Sinz	Fr
TE	85	Kyle Adams	Sr
TE	86	Gabe Holmes	Fr
WR	87	Kris Staats	Sr
TE	88	Jeff Lindsay	Sr

Defense

Pos.	#	Name	Class
DE	2	Gerald Gooden	Jr
LB	3	Dwayne Beckford	So
LB	5	Antwon Higgs	So
S	7	E. J. Johnson	Fr
CB	10	Mike Eargle	Jr
LB	11	DeVarro Graves	Jr
CB	15	Charlton Williams	Jr
LB	18	Nnamadi Ezenwa	So
CB	21	Ricardo Allen	Fr
S	22	Ishmael Aristide	Fr
LB	24	Jason Warner	Sr
CB	26	Antoine Lewis	Fr
CB	28	Josh Johnson	So
S	29	Chris Quinn	So
LB	30	Joe Holland	Jr
S	31	Normando Harris	Fr
S	32	Albert Evans	Jr
S	33	Jarrett Dieudonne	Fr
S	34	Max Charlot	So
S	35	Logan Link	Jr
LB	36	Zack Heiniger	So
LB	38	Mike Lee	Fr
LB	39	John Humphrey	Sr
LB	40	Collin Link	Fr
CB	41	Sean Collins	Fr
CB	43	Walter Williams	Sr
S	44	Landon Feichter	Fr
LB	45	Will Lucas	Fr
LB	47	Chris Carlino	Jr
DE	49	Adam Brockman	Jr
LB	51	Kakpindi Jamiru	Fr
DT	55	Brandon Taylor	Fr
LB	57	Joe Gilliam	Fr
DE	58	Robert Maci	So
DT	60	Brad Niemeier	So
DT	61	Ryan Isaac	Fr
DT	70	LaSalle Cooks	So
DE	84	Eric Mebane	So
DT	90	Bruce Gaston	Fr
DE	91	Justin Kitchens	Fr
DE	92	Rashad Frazier	Fr
DT	93	Kawann Short	So
DE	94	Ryan Kerrigan	Sr
DT	95	Kevin Pamphile	Fr
DE	97	Ryan Russell	Fr
DT	98	Eric McDaniel	Fr

Special teams

Pos.	#	Name	Class
K	14	Jonathan Linkenheimer	Fr
LS	31	Kevin Ballinger	Jr
K	36	Robert Harris	Fr
K	37	Carson Wiggs	Jr
P	42	Cody Webster	Fr
LS	50	Jesse Schmitt	Fr
LS	96	John Finch	Sr

Head coach

- Danny Hope

Coordinators/assistant coaches

- Gary Emanuel (defensive coordinator / defensive linemen)
- J. B. Gibboney (Special Teams Coordinator)
- Gary Nord (offensive coordinator / assistant head coach / quarterbacks)
- Lou Anarumo (defensive backs)
- Shawn Clark (offensive line)
- Patrick Higgins (wide receivers)
- Cornell Jackson (running backs)
- Donn Landholm (linebackers)
- Blue Adams (defensive graduate assistant)
- Steve Adams (defensive quality control assistant)
- Jason Strunk (offensive quality control assistant)
- Don Landholm (Outside linebackers)
- Kyle Smith (offensive graduate assistant)
- Don Coller (Recruiting Coordinator)
- Jim Lathrop (Director of Strength and Conditioning)
- Denny Miller (Director of Sports Medicine)
- Casey Nuss (Director of football operations)

Legend

- (C) Team captain
- (S) Suspended
- (I) Ineligible
- Injured
- Redshirt

Roster
Last update: October 23, 2017

== Statistics ==
Freshman Quarterback, Rob Henry, became the first ever player lead the Boilermakers in rushing and passing yards in the same season.

=== Team ===
	Purdue	Opp
Scoring	236	345
Points per game	19.7	28.8
First downs	190	255
Rushing	96	102
Passing	82	138
Penalty	12	15
Total offense	3,739	4,428
Avg per play	4.7	5.2
Avg per game	311.6	369
Fumbles-Lost	18–10	25–11
Penalties-Yards	77–684	66–530
Avg per game	57	44.2

	Team	Opp
Punts-Yards	70–2,834	61–2,496
Avg per punt	40.5	40.9
Time of possession/Game	28:15	31:45
3rd down conversions	58	71
4th down conversions	12	4
Touchdowns scored	27	45
Field goals-Attempts-Long	15–19–52	11–19–46
PAT-Attempts	27–27	38–41
Attendance	336,443	341,511
Games/Avg per Game	7/48,063	5/68,302

==== Scores by quarter ====
	1	2	3	4	OT	Total
Purdue	66	57	51	62	0	236
Opponents	91	62	77	112	3	345

=== Offense ===
==== Rushing ====
Name	GP	Att	Gain	Loss	Net	Avg	TD	Long	Avg/G
Rob Henry	11	104	594	47	547	5.3	4	67	49.7
Dan Dierking	12	118	568	38	530	4.5	3	42	44.2
Keith Carlos	9	56	337	23	314	5.6	2	80	34.9
Al-Terek McBurse	10	22	198	9	189	8.6	1	57	18.9
Antavian Edison	12	36	146	16	130	3.6	0	18	10.8
Jared Crank	12	22	82	6	76	3.5	1	36	6.3
Sean Robinson	5	31	100	51	49	1.6	0	17	9.8
Robert Marve	4	22	87	55	32	1.5	1	23	8.0
O.J. Ross	8	12	28	2	26	2.2	0	8	3.2
Gary Bush	11	1	16	0	16	16.0	0	16	1.5
Justin Siller	5	6	16	0	16	2.7	0	5	3.2
Cortez Smith	12	2	8	0	8	4.0	0	8	0.7
Reggie Pegram	12	5	7	0	7	1.4	0	6	0.6
Team	12	5	0	10	−10	−2.0	0	0	−0.8
Total	12	442	2,187	257	1,930	4.4	12	80	160.8

==== Passing ====
Name	GP	Effic	Att-Cmp-Int	Pct	Yds	TD	Lng	Avg/G
Rob Henry	11	112.4	162–86–7	53.1	996	8	76	90.5
Robert Marve	4	113.0	99–67–4	67.7	512	3	36	128.0
Sean Robinson	5	70.2	91–44–6	48.4	301	2	23	60.2
Team	12	0.0	2–0–0	0.0	0	0	0	0.0
Total	12	101.1	354–197–17	55.6	1,809	13	76	150.8

==== Receiving ====
Name	GP	No.	Yds	Avg	TD	Long	Avg/G
Kyle Adams	12	36	244	6.8	0	19	20.3
Cortez Smith	12	33	434	13.2	4	76	36.2
Antavian Edison	12	32	316	9.9	4	55	26.3
Dan Dierking	12	20	173	8.6	2	23	14.4
Keith Smith	2	18	123	8.7	0	16	61.5
Justin Siller	5	12	104	8.7	1	25	20.8
O.J. Ross	8	11	149	13.5	1	51	18.6
Gary Bush	11	11	95	8.6	1	39	8.6
Jeff Lindsey	9	9	72	8.0	0	15	8.0
Al-Terek McBurse	10	5	30	6.0	0	16	3.0
Keith Carlos	12	5	22	4.4	0	7	2.4
Jared Crank	12	1	14	14.0	0	14	1.2
Gabe Holmes	12	1	14	14.0	0	14	1.2
Rob Henry	11	1	11	11.0	0	11	1.0
Xavier Reese	5	1	9	9.0	0	9	1.8
Reggie Pegram	12	1	−1	−1.0	0	−1	−0.1
Total	12	197	1,809	9.1	13	76	150.8

=== Defense ===
Name	GP	Tackles				Sacks	Pass defense	Interceptions				Fumbles		Blkd Kick
Name	GP	Solo	Ast	Total	TFL-Yds	No-Yds	BrUp	No.-Yds	Avg	TD	Long	Rcv-Yds	FF	Blkd Kick
Logan Link	12	65	26	91	2–2	0–0	3	1–18	18.0	0	18	1–4	1	0
Dwayne Beckford	12	57	27	84	3.5–6	0.5–2	1	0–0	0.0	0	0	0–0	0	0
Joe Holland	12	48	25	73	7.5–15	1.5–5	0	0–0	0.0	0	0	0–0	0	0
Ricardo Allen	12	56	17	73	3.5–11	1–5	4	3–129	43.0	2	94	0–0	0	0
Ryan Kerrigan	12	50	20	70	26–111	12.5–73	1	0–0	0.0	0	0	2–0	5	0
Josh Johnson	12	42	11	53	1–11	12.5–73	6	1–13	13.0	0	13	1–0	3	0
Jason Werner	12	33	16	49	9.5–26	1.5–6	5	1–26	26.0	0	26	1–0	0	0
Total	12	555	226	821	91–357	33–192	37	10–212	21.2	2	94	11–4	17	2

=== Special teams ===
Name	Punting								Kickoffs				
Name	No.	Yds	Avg	Long	TB	FC	I20	Blkd	No.	Yds	Avg	TB	OB
Cody Webster	47	2,034	43.3	79	7	5	12	0					
Carson Wiggs	22	800	36.4	59	2	8	9	0	54	3,519	65.2	11	2
Team	1	0	0.0	0	0	0	0	1					
Total	70	8,834	40.5	79	9	13	21	20	1	54	3,519	11	2

Name	Punt returns					Kick returns				
Name	No.	Yds	Avg	TD	Long	No.	Yds	Avg	TD	Long
Al-Terek McBurse						21	446	21.2	0	35
O.J. Ross						12	277	23.1	0	45
T.J. Barbarette						7	167	23.9	0	54
Josh Johnson	8	73	9.1	0	24	1	19	19.0	0	19
Waynelle Gravesande	14	60	4.3	0	22	1	23	23.0	0	23
Antavian Edison						4	72	18.0	0	24
Robert Maci						3	22	7.3	0	8
Keith Carlos						1	19	19.0	0	19
Dan Dierking						1	15	15.0	0	15
Derek Jackson						1	12	12.0	0	12
Gabe Holmes						1	12	12.0	0	12
Keith Smith	1	4	4.0	0	4					
Joe Holland						1	3	3.0	0	3
Mike Eargle						1	0	0.0	0	0
Team	1	−3	−3.0	0	−3					
Total	24	134	5.6	0	24	55	1,087	19.8	0	54

== After the season ==
=== 2011 NFL draft ===
Player	Position	Round	Pick	NFL club
Ryan Kerrigan	Defensive end	1	16	Washington Redskins

=== Awards ===
- Unanimous First-team All-American (Ryan Kerrigan)
- Big Ten Defensive Player of the Year (Ryan Kerrigan)
- Big Ten Defensive Lineman of the Year (Ryan Kerrigan)
- Ryan Kerrigan semifinalist for the Rotary Lombardi Award.
