= Brett Brackett =

American football player (born 1987)

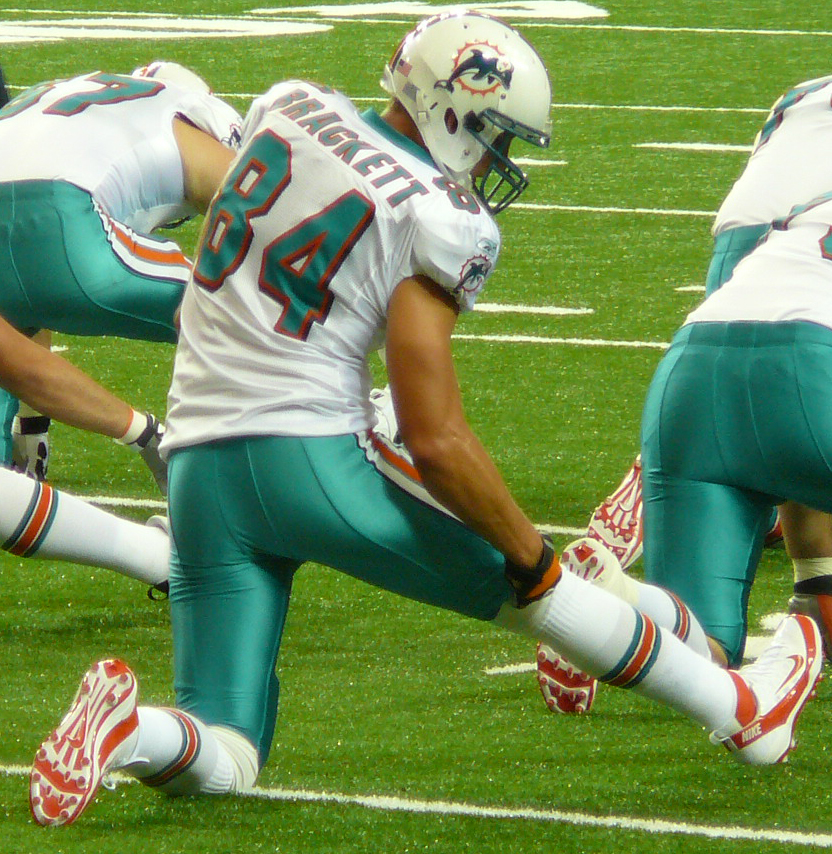
- Brackett with the Miami Dolphins in 2011

No. 89, 87
- Position: Tight end

Personal information
- Born: December 13, 1987 (age 38); New Brunswick, New Jersey, U.S.
- Listed height: 6 ft 5 in (1.96 m)
- Listed weight: 248 lb (112 kg)

Career information
- High school: Lawrence (Lawrence Township, New Jersey)
- College: Penn State
- NFL draft: 2011: undrafted

Career history
- Miami Dolphins (2011)*; Jacksonville Jaguars (2011)*; Philadelphia Eagles (2011–2012)*; Jacksonville Jaguars (2012); Arizona Cardinals (2014)*; Miami Dolphins (2014)*; Tennessee Titans (2014); Seattle Seahawks (2014); Tennessee Titans (2014)
- * Offseason or practice squad member only
- Stats at Pro Football Reference

Brett Michael Brackett (born December 13, 1987) is an American former professional football player who was a tight end in the National Football League (NFL). He played college football for the Penn State Nittany Lions and was signed by the Miami Dolphins of the National Football League (NFL) as an undrafted free agent in 2011.

== Early life ==
Brackett grew up in Lawrence Township, Mercer County, New Jersey, where he attended Lawrence High School.

== College career ==
Brackett attended Penn State University. In 2010, as a senior, he was the a co-captain along with Ollie Ogbu, who would later join him in the professional ranks on the Eagles roster. Though he was initially recruited as a quarterback, he converted to wide receiver where, during his senior season, he was quite formidable out of the slot. He caught 39 balls for 525 yards and five touchdowns in 2010.

== Professional career ==
=== Miami Dolphins ===
After going undrafted in the 2011 NFL draft, Brackett signed as a free agent with the Miami Dolphins on July 26, 2011.

=== Jacksonville Jaguars (first stint) ===
Brackett was signed to the Jacksonville Jaguars' practice squad on October 8, 2011. He was released on October 11.

=== Philadelphia Eagles ===
Brackett was signed on November 9, 2011, to the Philadelphia Eagles practice squad. At the conclusion of the 2011 season, his practice squad contract expired and he became a free agent. He was re-signed to the active roster on January 2, 2012. Brackett was expected to compete with Clay Harbor for the number two tight end spot. It was thought that he could make the roster as a third tight end, but he was waived during the final roster cuts.

=== Jacksonville Jaguars (second stint) ===
Brackett was claimed by Jacksonville on September 1, 2012. He sustained a knee injury in his first practice with the team and was placed on injured reserve. He was released on September 1, 2013.

=== Arizona Cardinals ===
On January 7, 2014, Brackett was signed to a future deal by the Arizona Cardinals. He was released on May 12, 2014.

=== Tennessee Titans ===
Brackett signed with the Tennessee Titans in September 2014.

=== Seattle Seahawks ===
Brackett was signed off waivers by the Seattle Seahawks on October 21, 2014. He was waived on October 29, 2014.
