= 2010 Penn State Nittany Lions football team =

American college football season

2010 Penn State Nittany Lions football

Outback Bowl, L 24–37 vs. Florida
- Conference: Big Ten Conference
- Record: 7–6 (4–4 Big Ten)
- Head coach: Joe Paterno (45th season)
- Offensive coordinator: Galen Hall (7th season)
- Offensive scheme: Spread
- Defensive coordinator: Tom Bradley (11th season)
- Base defense: 4–3
- Captains: Brett Brackett; Ollie Ogbu
- Home stadium: Beaver Stadium

2010 Big Ten Conference football standings
	Conf.			Overall
Team	W		L	W		L
No. 14 Michigan State +	7	–	1	11	–	2
No. 7 Wisconsin $+	7	–	1	11	–	2
Iowa	4	–	4	8	–	5
Illinois	4	–	4	7	–	6
Penn State	4	–	4	7	–	6
Michigan	3	–	5	7	–	6
Northwestern	3	–	5	7	–	6
Purdue	2	–	6	4	–	8
Minnesota	2	–	6	3	–	9
Indiana	1	–	7	5	–	7
No. 5 Ohio State† %	0	–	1	0	–	1
$ – BCS representative as conference champion; % – BCS at-large representative; + – Conference co-champions; † – Ohio State (12–1, 7–1) self-vacated all of their wins; Rankings from AP Poll

The 2010 Penn State Nittany Lions football team represented the Pennsylvania State University in the 2010 NCAA Division I FBS football season. The team was coached by Joe Paterno and played its home games in Beaver Stadium in University Park, Pennsylvania. They were members of the Big Ten Conference. Team captains for the season were wide receiver Brett Brackett and defensive tackle Ollie Ogbu.

The Nittany Lions finished the season 7–6, 4–4 in Big Ten play and were invited to the Outback Bowl where they were defeated by Florida 37–24.

== Schedule ==
Date	Time	Opponent	Rank	Site	TV	Result	Attendance	Source
September 4	12:00 p.m.	Youngstown State*	No. 19	Beaver Stadium; University Park, PA	BTN	W 44–14	101,213	
September 11	7:00 p.m.	at No. 1 Alabama*	No. 18	Bryant–Denny Stadium; Tuscaloosa, AL (rivalry, College GameDay)	ESPN	L 3–24	101,821	
September 18	12:00 p.m.	Kent State*	No. 22	Beaver Stadium; University Park, PA	ESPN2	W 24–0	100,610	
September 25	3:30 p.m.	Temple*	No. 23	Beaver Stadium; University Park, PA	BTN	W 22–13	104,840	
October 2	8:00 p.m.	at No. 18 Iowa	No. 22	Kinnick Stadium; Iowa City, IA	ESPN	L 3–24	70,585	
October 9	12:00 p.m.	Illinois^{†}		Beaver Stadium; University Park, PA	ESPN2	L 13–33	107,638	
October 23	12:00 p.m.	at Minnesota		TCF Bank Stadium; Minneapolis, MN (Governor's Victory Bell)	ESPNU	W 33–21	48,479	
October 30	8:00 p.m.	Michigan		Beaver Stadium; University Park, PA (rivalry)	ESPN	W 41–31	108,539	
November 6	3:30 p.m.	Northwestern		Beaver Stadium; University Park, PA	ABC/ESPN2	W 35–21	104,147	
November 13	3:30 p.m.	at No. 7 Ohio State		Ohio Stadium; Columbus, OH (rivalry, College GameDay)	ABC/ESPN	L 14–38	105,466	
November 20	12:00 p.m.	vs. Indiana		FedExField; Landover, MD	BTN	W 41–24	78,790	
November 27	12:00 p.m.	No. 10 Michigan State		Beaver Stadium; University Park, PA (rivalry)	ESPN2	L 22–28	102,649	
January 1, 2011	1:00 p.m.	vs. Florida*		Raymond James Stadium; Tampa, FL (Outback Bowl)	ABC	L 24–37	60,574	
*Non-conference game; ^{†}Homecoming; Rankings from AP Poll released prior to the game; All times are in Eastern time

== Game summaries ==
=== September 4: Youngstown State ===
	1	2	3	4	Total
Youngstown State	7	0	0	7	14
#14 Penn State	3	13	14	14	44

Rob Bolden became the first true freshman to start the season opening game at quarterback for Penn State since Shorty Miller in 1910. Bolden led the Nittany Lions to at 44–14 victory over the Football Championship Subdivision Youngstown State Penguins. He passed for 239 yards and two touchdowns to wide receiver Brett Brackett. Collin Wagner was 3 for 3 in field goals over 40 yards. Chaz Powell returned the second half kickoff for a 100-yard touchdown.

Although Penn State trailed 7–6 much of the half, in all they scored 41 unanswered points and only punted once. On their final drive, Kevin Newsome and Silas Redd were in to put the Nittany Lions on top 44–7. Youngstown State got a final touchdown against reserves to make it 44–14 before Matt McGloin got some playing time near the end.

=== September 11: @ Alabama ===
	1	2	3	4	Total
#14 Penn State	0	0	0	3	3
#1 Alabama	7	10	0	7	24

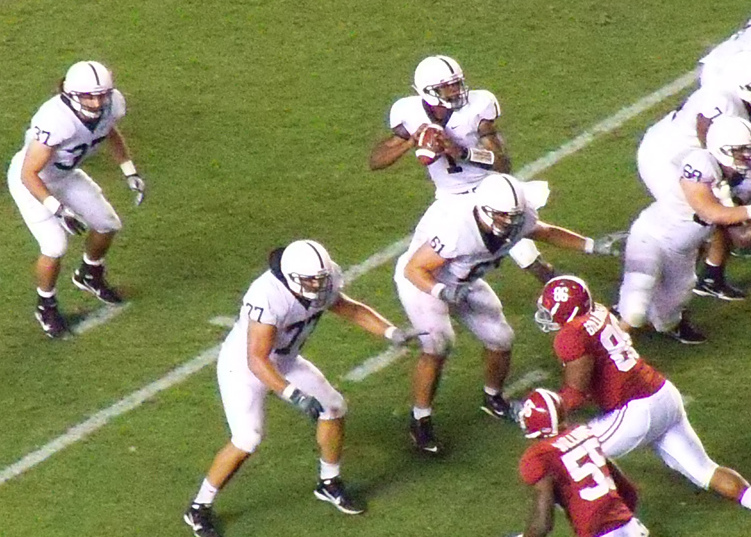
Bolden drops back to pass

Aided by turnovers, the #1 Crimson Tide defeated the #14 Nittany Lions in front of 101,821 in Tuscaloosa. After both teams exchanged punts, the Crimson Tide scored a touchdown to make it 7–0 with a pass to Julio Jones. Penn State blew a chance to tie the game after Bolden was picked off and the Tide marched downfield to make it 14–0. Alabama would add another field goal and miss one more as the Nittany Lions continued to have trouble finishing off drives. Early in the 4th, Alabama put the game away with a Trent Richardson touchdown dive to go up 24–0, but Penn State finally got on the board with a field goal to make it 24–3, yet the Nittany Lions could not close the gap any further. This game was the first time they had been held to 3 points since losing 13–3 in 2006 at Wisconsin, but avoided their first shutout loss since a 20–0 loss to Michigan in 2001. Penn State also got some playing time for backup Kevin Newsome who completed his first pass of 2010 (his only pass attempt against Youngstown State was an incompletion that led to a pass interference penalty on the Penguins). Despite the loss, the Nittany Lions still have not surrendered more than 24 points in the regular season since the 2007 35–31 loss to Michigan State.

Alabama finished the game with 409 total yards and Trent Richardson finished with 190 rushing yards by himself and a touchdown. Rob Bolden has yet to be sacked this year.

=== September 18: Kent State ===
	1	2	3	4	Total
Kent State	0	0	0	0	0
#20 Penn State	14	0	3	7	24

Penn State's defense delivered their first shutout since the 2009 victory over the Minnesota Golden Gophers when the Nittany Lions defeated the Kent State Golden Flashes of the Mid-American Conference. Rob Bolden ran for and passed for a touchdown to Devon Smith. Evan Royster ran for his first touchdown of the season but was limited to just 38 yards. The defense garnered two interceptions to help offset the two interceptions thrown by Bolden, who has still not been sacked.

=== September 25: Temple ===
	1	2	3	4	Total
Temple	13	0	0	0	13
#20 Penn State	6	3	6	7	22

The Nittany Lions handed coach Al Golden's Owls their first loss on the season defeating them 22–13. Collin Wagner converted 5 of 6 field goal attempts and Michael Zordich Jr. scored the lone Penn State touchdown from his fullback position. Senior Evan Royster had his first 100-yard game of the season in gaining 187 yards on 26 carries. True freshmen quarterback Rob Bolden completed 18 of 28 passes for 224 yards. Justin Brown was the leading Penn State receiver catching 4 throws for 84 yards. The defense gathered three interceptions, one by Nate Stupar and two by Nick Sukay. Pete Massaro recovered a Chester Stewart fumble on the final play of the game.

=== October 2: @ Iowa ===
	1	2	3	4	Total
#20 Penn State	0	3	0	0	3
#18 Iowa	10	7	0	7	24

The Penn State rushing offense struggled against the Iowa defense and was held to only 54 yards in total rushing. While the total offensive yards trailed Iowa's by only 48, the Lions' woe in the opponent's redzone continued. Penn State had three trips into the Iowa redzone (at the 2, 1, and 12 yard lines respectively) but ended up with only one field goal. The Nittany Lion defense kept the Iowa offense scoreless in the 2nd half, but the Iowa defense stood up again and scored a touchdown from an interception return in the 4th quarter.

=== October 9: Illinois ===
	1	2	3	4	Total
Illinois	0	20	10	3	33
Penn State	3	10	0	0	13

The Nittany Lions were defeated by the Fighting Illini in the homecoming game and the Big Ten home opener. It is the first time that Penn State has lost to Illinois in Happy Valley. The offense gained only 7 first downs and 235 total yards, the seven first downs being the second fewest by Penn State in the Paterno era. Although the special team recovered two Illinois punt-return fumbles deep in the Illini territory, the Lions had to settle for two field goals. Quarterback Rob Bolden delivered an 80-yard touchdown pass to Derek Moye, but also threw an interception, that was returned for an Illinois touchdown, in the 2nd quarter. Losing 7 defensive starters to injuries, and 12 overall contributors the defense collapsed against the Illinois running attack, giving up 282 rushing yards and allowing the Illini to possess the ball for more than 38 minutes.

=== October 23: @ Minnesota ===
	1	2	3	4	Total
Penn State	7	14	3	9	33
Minnesota	7	0	7	7	21

Penn State won for the first time in the 2010 Big Ten season defeating the Golden Gophers 33–21 in Joe Paterno's first visit to the TCF Bank Stadium. Quarterback Rob Bolden completed 11 of 13 passes for 130 yards including a 21-yard touchdown to Brett Brackett before leaving the game with an apparent concussion. Backup quarterbacks Kevin Newsome and Matthew McGloin took the remainder of the snaps at quarterback with McGloin doing all of the throwing. He completed his first two career touchdown passes to Derek Moye. Evan Royster added to the scoring with a two-yard touchdown run. Colin Wagner kicked one field goal and the defense garnered a safety to complete the scoring in Joe Paterno's 398th career win. Leading 33–14 with the game in hand, the reserves gave up a late Gophers touchdown.

=== October 30: Michigan ===
	1	2	3	4	Total
Michigan	7	3	14	7	31
Penn State	14	14	10	3	41

Joe Paterno got his 399th career win by starting a former walk-on quarterback, Matt McGloin, for the first time. In his first career start, Matt McGloin passed for 250 yards and scored a passing touchdown and a rushing touchdown. Running back Evan Royster surpassed Curt Warner and became the all-time Penn State rushing leader by running 150 yards on 29 carries with 2 touchdowns. Although the Lions' defense could not stop Michigan's Denard Robinson, who posted 190 passing yards and 191 rushing yards, the Penn State offense was able to march down the field with a commanding 10–16 3rd-down efficiency. The Lions controlled the ball for more than 37 minutes and outscored Michigan by a stunning 28–10 in the first half partly due to turnovers, never trailing, and boosted the lead to 31–10 early in the 3rd quarter. Michigan scored a TD but Penn State quickly restored the three touchdown lead. Michigan scored two more TDs, one late in the third, the other midway through the 4th to cut the lead to 7, but Penn State put it away with a field goal, and after stopping Michigan on 4th down, drove all the way to the 1 yard line before taking a knee.

=== November 6: Northwestern ===
	1	2	3	4	Total
Northwestern	7	14	0	0	21
Penn State	0	7	21	7	35

After a week of speculation on who should be the starting quarterback, Rob Bolden got the nod after recovering from concussion. However, he was hit hard during one play in the 1st quarter and was relieved by Matt McGloin. Penn State could not stop the Wildcats quarterback Dan Persa in the first half and trailed by 21 points late in the 2nd quarter. After a 91-yard drive in the last minute of the 2nd quarter, the Lions managed to score their first touchdown of the game. Penn State continued the momentum and dominated the opponent in the 2nd half. The Lions scored 4 consecutive touchdowns and shutout Northwestern to win the game from behind. Evan Royster and Silas Redd both ran for over 130 yards and McGloin passed for four touchdowns to Brett Brackett, Nate Cadogan, Derek Moye and Royster. Linebacker Michael Mauti led the Penn State defense with 11 tackles, including 3 tackles for loss. The 35–21 victory marked the 400th career win for head coach Joe Paterno. The win also matched Penn State's biggest come-from-behind victory under Paterno.

=== November 13: @ Ohio State ===
	1	2	3	4	Total
Penn State	7	7	0	0	14
#7 Ohio State	3	0	14	21	38

A 17-point underdog, the Lions outplayed the Buckeyes in the first half of the game. Matt McGloin led a balanced Penn State offense to score two passing touchdowns. The first touchdown was also Penn State's first passing touchdowns in Ohio Stadium under Joe Paterno. Also, the first 14+ point game at Ohio State since 1978.

Although leading by 11 points in the first half, Penn State was dominated in the second half. The Lions generated only 60 yards of total offense in the last 30 minutes of the game, most of which came on their opening drive of the third quarter. After a 13–18 pass completion rate in the first half, McGloin completed 2 of his 12 pass attempts in the second half and threw two interceptions, both of which were returned by Buckeyes for touchdowns. The Penn State defense also failed to stop Ohio State's running attack, especially after linebacker Mike Mauti left the game with shoulder injury. The Lions defense surrendered 314 rushing yards and Ohio State scored 35 unanswered points to win the game. Despite this, improvements from their first three losses were noted in the deceptive final score, as it was a winnable game for over 50 minutes until the Buckeyes made it 31–14 from a Matt McGloin pick six. This game would be later be vacated by Ohio State due to NCAA violations.

=== November 20: vs. Indiana at Landover, Maryland ===
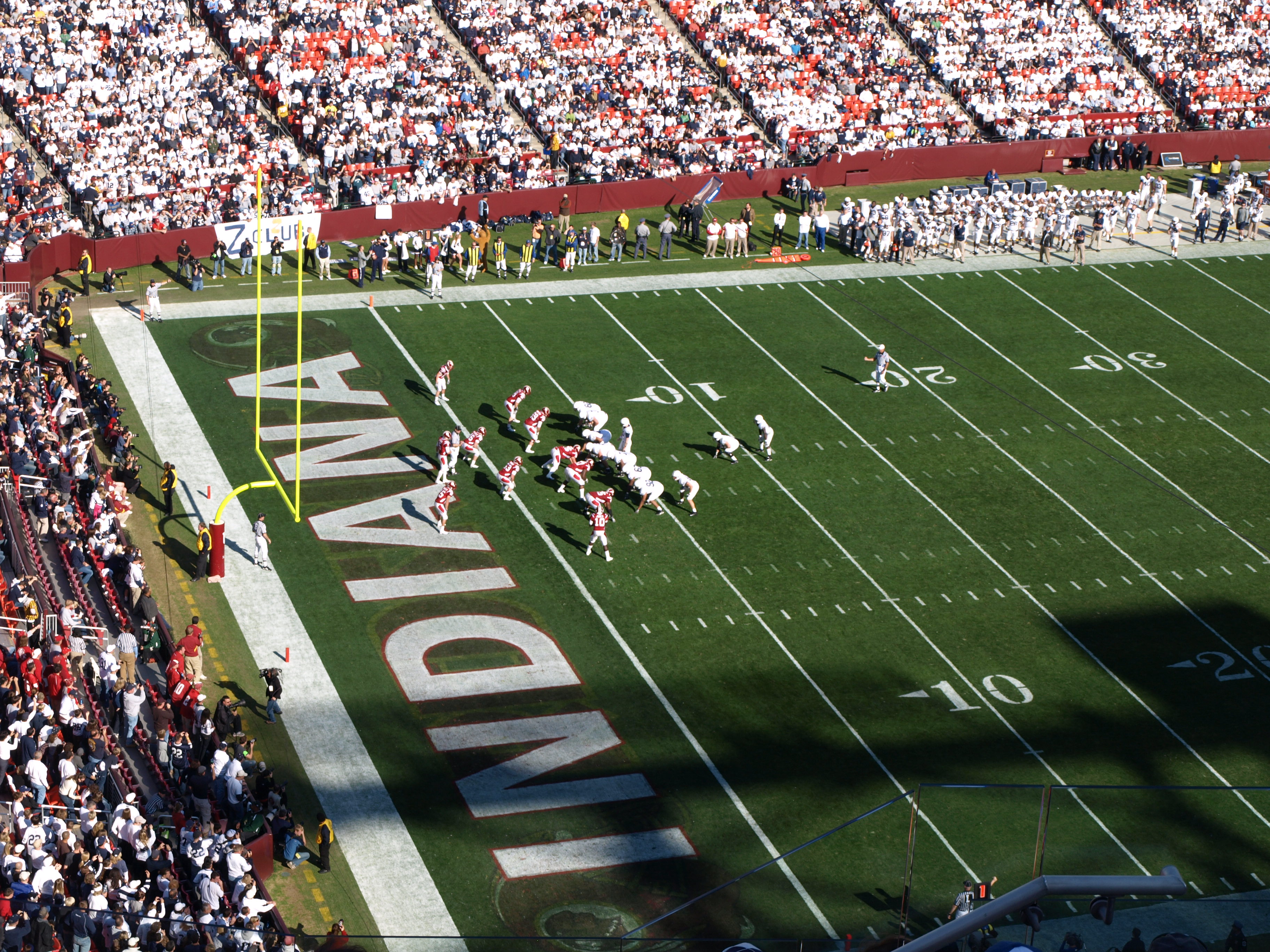
The offense lines up just before Silas Redd's touchdown

	1	2	3	4	Total
Penn State	7	10	14	10	41
Indiana	0	14	10	0	24

Penn State scored two touchdowns in the first two drives of the game and led by 14 points early in the 2nd quarter. However, the Hoosiers managed to tie the game at 24–24 in the 3rd quarter. The Lions broke the tie when Andrew Dailey blocked an Indiana punt and James Van Fleet returned it for a touchdown and scored 17 unanswered points to win the game in the Fedex Field. Matt McGloin passed for 315 yards with 2 touchdowns to Derek Moye and Brett Brackett. Penn State also ran for 171 yards, with running touchdowns from Evan Royster and Silas Redd. Many reserves saw playing time in the second half of the fourth quarter.

=== November 27: Michigan State ===
	1	2	3	4	Total
#10 Michigan State	7	7	7	7	28
Penn State	3	0	0	19	22

Although Penn State generated 396 offensive yards, 65 more than the Spartans in the game, the Lions offense could not score any touchdown in the first 3 quarters and trailed by 18 points after 44 minutes of play. Penn State surged in the 4th quarter and scored 3 touchdowns from Joe Suhey, Evan Royster and Derek Moye. However, the balanced Spartans attack was able to control the ball for more than 34 minutes and scored their 4th touchdown in the 4th quarter. Penn State's final attempt to come from behind fell short after a failed onside kick in the last minute of the game. The Lions also committed 8 penalties, the most in one game this season, with 67 yards.

The game was Penn State's first home loss to Michigan State since 1965, a year before Joe Paterno became the Penn State head coach. Penn State sent off 18 seniors and finished their 2010 regular season with a 7–5 (4–4 Big Ten) record.

=== January 1 vs. Florida (2011 Outback Bowl) ===
	1	2	3	4	Total
Florida	0	14	6	17	37
Penn State	7	10	7	0	24

The Nittany Lions concluded the 2010–2011 season with a 7–6 record after losing the 2011 Outback Bowl. The Lions were hurt badly by miscues and turnovers, as all Florida touchdowns were set up by Penn State's miscues. The Gators scored a touchdown after blocking a Penn State punt in the 2nd quarter. Quarterback McGloin threw a school-record five interceptions in the game: the 2nd and 3rd were deep in the Penn State territory (15 and 25 yards) and directly led to Florida touchdowns; the 4th interception was returned by the Gators for an 80-yard touchdown and ended Penn State's final hope to win the game.

Senior back Evan Royster led the Lions with 98 rushing and 51 receiving yards, which marked his third straight season with over 1,000 yards. Receiver Derek Moye also recorded 5 catches for 79 yards. Penn State offense outplayed Florida by 71 yards in total offense and controlled the ball for more than 32 minutes in the loss.

After the game, quarterback Rob Bolden and his father requested to transfer from Penn State. However, their request was denied by Joe Paterno later.

== Personnel ==
=== Coaching staff ===
- Joe Paterno – Head Coach
- Dick Anderson – Offensive Line (Guards and Centers)
- Tom Bradley – Defensive Coordinator and Cornerbacks
- Kermit Buggs – Safeties
- Galen Hall – Offensive Coordinator and Running Backs
- Larry Johnson Sr. – Defensive Line
- Bill Kenney – Offensive Tackles and Tight Ends
- Mike McQueary – Wide Receivers and Recruiting Coordinator
- Jay Paterno – Quarterbacks
- Ron Vanderlinden – Linebackers
- John Thomas – Strength and Conditioning

=== Roster ===
2010 Penn State Nittany Lions football team roster
Players
Coaches
Offense

Pos.	#	Name	Class
QB	1	Robert Bolden	Fr
RB	3	Brandon Beachum	Jr
WR	4	Shawney Kersey	Fr
WR	5	Graham Zug	Sr
WR	6	Derek Moye	Jr
WR	7	Curtis Drake	So
WR	8	Brandon Moseby-Felder	Fr
QB	10	Paul Jones	Fr
QB	11	Matt McGloin	So
QB	12	Kevin Newsome	So
TE	13	Mark Wedderburn	So
WR	15	Alex Kenney	Fr
QB	16	Shane McGregor	So
WR	17	Christian Kuntz	Fr
WR	18	Andrew Goodman	So
QB	19	Garrett Venuto	Fr
WR	19	Justin Brown	So
WR	20	Devon Smith	So
RB	21	Stephfon Green	Jr
RB	22	Evan Royster	Sr
RB	24	Derek Day	So
RB	25	Silas Redd	Fr
RB	26	Curtis Dukes	Fr
WR	27	Tariq Tongue	Fr
RB	29	Kevin Kowalishen	So
FB	33	Andre Dupree	Fr
FB	35	Pat Zerbe	Fr
RB	36	Deron Thompson	Fr
RB	37	Joe Suhey	Jr
FB	41	Zach Zwinak	Fr
G	50	DeOn'tae Pannell	Jr
OL	51	Patrick Christie	Fr
OT	52	Chimaeze Okoli	Jr
C	54	Matt Stankiewitch	So
OL	55	Tom Ricketts	Fr
OT	58	Adam Gress	Fr
C	60	Ty Howle	Fr
G	61	Stefen Wisniewski	Sr
G	62	Frank Figueroa	Fr
OL	63	Alex Mateas	Fr
G	64	John Urschel	Fr
C	65	Miles Dieffenbach	Fr
OT	67	Quinn Barham	Jr
C	68	Doug Klopacz	Sr
G	70	Anthony Tortorelli	Jr
G	72	Khamrone Kolb	Fr
G	73	Mark Arcidiacono	Fr
G	74	Johnnie Troutman	Jr
G	75	Eric Shrive	Fr
OT	76	Nate Cadogan	Fr
G	77	Lou Eliades	Sr
OT	78	Mike Farrell	So
OL	79	Luke Graham	Fr
TE	80	Andrew Szczerba	Jr
WR	81	Ryan Scherer	So
TE	82	Kevin Haplea	Fr
WR	83	Brett Brackett (C)	Sr
TE	87	Jonathan Stewart	Jr
TE	88	J.D. Mason	So
TE	89	Garry Gilliam	Fr

Defense

Pos.	#	Name	Class
S	1	Nick Sukay	Jr
CB	2	Chaz Powell	Jr
CB	5	Derrick Thomas	Fr
LB	6	Gerald Hodges	So
CB	8	D'Anton Lynn	Jr
LB	9	Michael Zordich	So
S	10	Malcolm Willis	Fr
LB	11	Khairi Fortt	Fr
CB	12	Stephon Morris	So
S	13	Andrew Dailey	Jr
CB	14	Mike Wallace	Fr
CB	14	Evan Lewis	So
LB	15	Bani Gbadyu	Sr
CB	16	Shelton McCullough	Sr
S	23	Stephen Obeng-Agyapong	Fr
S	24	Jonathan Duckett	Fr
S	27	Jacob Fagnano	So
S	28	Drew Astorina	Jr
S	30	Ryan Keiser	Fr
LB	31	Nick Delligatti	Fr
LB	32	Dakota Royer	Fr
LB	33	Michael Yancich	So
LB	34	Nathan Stupar	Jr
S	36	Kyle Johnson	Jr
S	38	Tyler Ahrenhold	Jr
CB	39	Jesse Della Valle	Fr
LB	40	Glenn Carson	Fr
DL	41	J.R. Refice	Fr
LB	42	Michael Mauti	So
LB	43	Mike Hull	Fr
DE	44	Kevion Latham	Jr
LB	46	Ken Pollock	So
DL	47	Jordan Hill	So
DE	48	Chris Colasanti	Sr
DE	52	Brian Irvin	So
LB	54	James Van Fleet	So
DE	56	Eric Latimore	Jr
DE	59	Pete Massaro	So
DT	71	Devon Still	Jr
DT	75	Evan Hailes	Fr
DE	81	Jack Crawford	Jr
LB	83	Brad Bars	Fr
DT	84	Kyle Baublitz	Fr
DT	85	Ollie Ogbu (C)	Sr
DE	86	C.J. Olaniyan	Fr
DE	90	Sean Stanley	So
DT	91	DaQuan Jones	Fr
DT	93	James Terry	So
DE	94	Shawn Oakman	Fr
DT	96	Cody Castor	So
DT	99	Brandon Ware	So

Special teams

Pos.	#	Name	Class
K	28	David Soldner	So
K	29	Russell Nye	So
K	30	Anthony Fera	Fr
K	36	Collin Wagner	Sr
LS	44	Michael Fuhrman	So
P	45	Alex Butterworth	Fr
P	49	A.J. Firestone	Fr
LS	53	Jon Rohrbaugh	Jr
LS	57	Emery Etter	Fr

Head coach

- Joe Paterno

Coordinators/assistant coaches

- Tom Bradley (Defensive Coordinator/Cornerbacks)
- Galen Hall (Offensive Coordinator/Running Backs)
- Ron Vanderlinden (Linebackers)
- Kermit Buggs (Safeties)
- Mike McQueary – (Wide Receivers/Recruiting Coordinator)
- Dick Anderson (Guards/Centers)
- Bill Kenney (Offensive Tackles/Tight Ends)
- Jay Paterno (Quarterbacks)
- Larry Johnson, Sr. (Defensive Line)
- John Thomas (Strength and Conditioning)

Legend

- (C) Team captain
- (S) Suspended
- (I) Ineligible
- Injured
- Redshirt

Roster
Last update: September 1, 2010

== Awards ==
On November 29, 2010, three Penn State players were selected to the 2010 All-Big Ten Team in voting by the conference coaches and media. Guard Stefen Wisniewski was again selected to the first team (by coaches) after his 2009 All-Big Ten first team selection. Ollie Ogbu and Evan Royster were second team selections by coaches.

=== Watchlists ===
- Jack Crawford
  Bednarik Award watchlist
- Evan Royster
  Walter Camp Football Foundation Player of the Year watchlist
  Maxwell Award nominee
- Collin Wagner
  Lou Groza Award finalist
- Stefen Wisniewski
  Campbell Trophy finalist
  Lowe's Senior CLASS Award finalist
  Wuerffel Trophy finalist

=== Players ===
- Rob Bolden
  Big Ten Freshman of the Week (Sept. 4)
- Brett Brackett
  Academic All-Big Ten
  Big Ten Sportsmanship Award
- Chris Colasanti
  ESPN Academic All-American
  Academic All-Big Ten
- Andrew Dailey
  Academic All-Big Ten
- Emery Etter
  Academic All-Big Ten
- Garry Gilliam
  Academic All-Big Ten
- Tyler Howle
  Academic All-Big Ten
- Kyle Johnson
  Academic All-Big Ten
- Kevion Latham
  Academic All-Big Ten
- Pete Massaro
  ESPN Academic All-American
  Academic All-Big Ten
- Michael Mauti
  Big Ten Defensive Player of the Week (Nov. 6)
- Leonard McCullough
  Academic All-Big Ten
- Stephen Obeng-Agyapong
  Academic All-Big Ten
- Silas Redd
  ESPN Big Ten All-Freshman team
- Jonathan Rohrbaugh
  Academic All-Big Ten
- David Soldner
  Academic All-Big Ten
- Matthew Stankiewitch
  Academic All-Big Ten
- Stephen Stupar
  Academic All-Big Ten
- Joseph Suhey
  Academic All-Big Ten
- James Van Fleet
  Academic All-Big Ten
- Collin Wagner
  Big Ten Special Teams Player of the Week (Sept. 25)
  Big Ten Special Teams Player of the Week (Oct 30)
- Michael Wallace
  Academic All-Big Ten
- Malcolm Willis
  ESPN Big Ten All-Freshman team
- Stefen Wisniewski
  Allstate AFCA Good Works Team
  National Football Foundation & College Hall of Fame Scholar-Athlete
  ESPN Academic All-American
  AFCA All-American
  All-Big Ten (Coaches)
  ESPN All-Big Ten
  Academic All-Big Ten

== After the season ==
=== All-star games ===
Game	Date	Site	Players
86th East–West Shrine Game	January 22, 2011	Florida Citrus Bowl Stadium, Orlando, Florida	Evan Royster; Ollie Ogbu
1st Eastham Energy All-Star Game	January 23, 2011	Sun Devil Stadium, Tempe, Arizona	Brett Brackett
