= 2011 Outback Bowl =

- 25th Outback Bowl
- Anniversary logo
| Florida Gators | Penn State Nittany Lions |
| (7–5) | (7–5) |
| SEC | Big Ten |
| 37 | 24 |
| Head coach: Urban Meyer | Head coach: Joe Paterno |
| | 1 | 2 | 3 | 4 | Total |
|---|---|---|---|---|---|
| Florida | 0 | 14 | 6 | 17 | 37 |
| Penn State | 7 | 10 | 7 | 0 | 24 |
- Date: January 1, 2011
- Season: 2010
- Stadium: Raymond James Stadium
- Location: Tampa, Florida
- MVP: S Ahmad Black, Florida
- Favorite: Florida by 7
- National anthem: Janet Dacal
- Referee: Jack Childress (ACC)
- Attendance: 60,574
- Payout: US$3.4 million

United States TV coverage
- Network: ABC
- Announcers: Mike Tirico, Jon Gruden and Suzy Kolber
- Nielsen ratings: 7.1 (12.4 million)

The 2011 Outback Bowl, a college football bowl game, matched the Florida Gators of the Southeastern Conference (SEC) against the Penn State Nittany Lions of the Big Ten. The 25th edition of the Outback Bowl, it was played at Raymond James Stadium in Tampa, Florida. The game kicked off at 1 p.m. EST on January 1, 2011, and was telecast on ABC. The Florida Gators won with a final score of 37–24.

== Teams ==
=== Florida ===
The Gators also entered the bowl with an identical 7–5 record to their opponents. This was set to be head coach Urban Meyer's final game at Florida as he retired for health reasons. The offense especially sputtered toward season's end, turning the ball over six times and averaging 251.0 yards in Florida's last two games against FBS opponents, losses to South Carolina and Florida State by a combined 67–21. Florida was without starters cornerback Janoris Jenkins (right shoulder), right tackle Maurice Hurt (right knee), defensive tackles Lawrence Marsh (right hip) and Terron Sanders (right shoulder) who had surgeries.

=== Penn State ===
The Nittany Lions entered the contest with a 7–5 record in coach Joe Paterno's 45th year at the helm. Paterno looked to add to his record 24 postseason victories. Penn State, finished ninth in the Big Ten in points per game (24.6). Freshman Rob Bolden threw five touchdowns in seven games before being replaced by sophomore Matt McGloin, who tossed 13 TDs the rest of the way. The Nittany Lions had played in three previous Outback Bowls having won all of them. They attempted to be the first team in bowl history with 4 Outback Bowl victories.

== Game Notes ==
This was the third time that the two squads have met in school history. Florida currently leads the matchup 3–0. Both prior meetings were also in bowl games, the 1962 Gator Bowl and the 1998 Citrus Bowl. The game drew a national television rating of 7.1, the fourth highest among all 2010/2011 Bowl Games.

== Game summary ==
=== Scoring summary ===
First Quarter

- 9:08 PSU TD Matt McGloin passed to Derek Moye to the left for 5-yard gain (Collin Wagner made PAT) 7–0 PSU

Second Quarter

- 13:00 FLA TD Omarius Hines rushed to the left for 16-yard gain (Chas Henry made PAT) 7–7 tied
- 6:58 FLA TD Florida blocked punt attempt by Anthony Fera. Lerentee McCray returned for 27 yards (Chas Henry made PAT) 14–7 FLA
- 4:15 PSU TD Michael Zordich rushed up the middle for 1-yard gain (Collin Wagner made PAT) 14–14 tied
- 0:49 PSU FG Collin Wagner kicked a 20-yard field goal 17–14 PSU

Third Quarter

- 9:13 FLA FG Chas Henry kicked a 30-yard field goal 17–17 tied
- 4:50 PSU TD Matthew McGloin rushed to the right for 2-yard gain (Collin Wagner made PAT) 24–17 PSU
- 2:50 FLA FG Chas Henry kicked a 47-yard field goal 24–20 PSU

Fourth Quarter

- 13:10 FLA TD Mike Gillislee rushed to the left for 1-yard gain (Chas Henry made PAT) 27–24 FLA
- 7:36 FLA FG Chas Henry kicked a 20-yard field goal 30–24 FLA
- 1:11 FLA TD Ahmad Black intercepted Matthew McGloin for 80 yards (Chas Henry made PAT) 37–24 FLA

== Statistics ==
=== Florida ===
- QB Jordan Reed, 8/13, 60 yds, 24 rush, 68 yds
- QB John Brantley, 6/13, 41 yds, 1 Int
- RB Mike Gillislee, 4 rush, 10 yds, 1 TD
- WR Chris Rainey, 6 rush, 66 yds, 3 rec, 18 yds
- WR Omarius Hines, 2 rush, 31 yds, 1 TD, 2 rec, 27 yds
- S Ahmad Black, 2 Int, 129 yds, 1 TD

=== Penn State ===
- QB Matthew McGloin, 17/41, 211 yds, 2 TD (1 passing, 1 rushing), 5 Int
- RB Evan Royster, 20 rush, 98 yds, 4 rec, 51 yds
- FB Michael Zordich, 3 rush, 5 yds, 1 TD
- WR Derek Moye, 5 rec, 79 yds, 1 TD
