= 2010 Illinois Fighting Illini football team =

American college football season

2010 Illinois Fighting Illini football

Texas Bowl champion

Texas Bowl, W 38–14 vs. Baylor
- Conference: Big Ten Conference
- Record: 7–6 (4–4 Big Ten)
- Head coach: Ron Zook (6th season)
- Offensive coordinator: Paul Petrino (1st season)
- Offensive scheme: Multiple
- Defensive coordinator: Vic Koenning (1st season)
- Base defense: 4–3
- MVP: Mikel Leshoure
- Captains: Jeff Allen; Corey Liuget; Eddie McGee; Martez Wilson
- Home stadium: Memorial Stadium

2010 Big Ten Conference football standings
	Conf.			Overall
Team	W		L	W		L
No. 14 Michigan State +	7	–	1	11	–	2
No. 7 Wisconsin $+	7	–	1	11	–	2
Iowa	4	–	4	8	–	5
Illinois	4	–	4	7	–	6
Penn State	4	–	4	7	–	6
Michigan	3	–	5	7	–	6
Northwestern	3	–	5	7	–	6
Purdue	2	–	6	4	–	8
Minnesota	2	–	6	3	–	9
Indiana	1	–	7	5	–	7
No. 5 Ohio State† %	0	–	1	0	–	1
$ – BCS representative as conference champion; % – BCS at-large representative; + – Conference co-champions; † – Ohio State (12–1, 7–1) self-vacated all of their wins; Rankings from AP Poll

The 2010 Illinois Fighting Illini football team was an American football team that represented the University of Illinois Urbana-Champaign as a member of the Big Ten Conference during the 2010 NCAA Division I FBS football season. In their sixth season under head coach Ron Zook, the Fighting Illini compiled a 7–6 record (4–4 in conference games), finished in three-way tie for third place in the Big Ten, and outscored opponents by a total of 423 to 305. They concluded the season in the Texas Bowl where they defeated Baylor, 38–14.

The team's statistical leaders included quarterback Nathan Scheelhaase (1,825 passing yards), running back Mikel Leshoure (1,697 rushing yards, 20 touchdowns, 122 points scored), and wide receiver A. J. Jenkins (56 receptions for 746 yards).

The team played its home games at Memorial Stadium in Champaign, Illinois.

== Schedule ==
Date	Time	Opponent	Site	TV	Result	Attendance	Source
September 4	11:30 am	vs. Missouri*	Edward Jones Dome; St. Louis, MO (Arch Rivalry)	FSN	L 13–23	58,060	
September 11	6:30 pm	No. 5 (FCS) Southern Illinois*	Memorial Stadium; Champaign, IL	BTN	W 35–3	52,217	
September 18	11:00 am	Northern Illinois*	Memorial Stadium; Champaign, IL	BTN	W 28–22	50,569	
October 2	11:00 am	No. 2 Ohio State	Memorial Stadium; Champaign, IL (Illibuck)	BTN	L 13–24	62,870	
October 9	11:00 am	at Penn State	Beaver Stadium; University Park, PA	ESPN2	W 33–13	107,638	
October 16	11:00 am	at No. 13 Michigan State	Spartan Stadium; East Lansing, MI	BTN	L 6–26	74,441	
October 23	11:00 am	Indiana^{†}	Memorial Stadium; Champaign, IL (rivalry)	BTN	W 43–13	53,550	
October 30	11:00 am	Purdue	Memorial Stadium; Champaign, IL (rivalry)	ESPN2	W 44–10	50,371	
November 6	11:00 am	at Michigan	Michigan Stadium; Ann Arbor, MI (rivalry)	ESPN	L 65–67 ^{3OT}	111,441	
November 13	11:00 am	Minnesota	Memorial Stadium; Champaign, IL	BTN	L 34–38	55,549	
November 20	2:30 pm	vs. No. 25 Northwestern	Wrigley Field; Chicago, IL (rivalry, College GameDay)	ESPNU	W 48–27	41,058	
December 3	9:15 pm	at Fresno State*	Bulldog Stadium; Fresno, CA	ESPN2	L 23–25	30,625	
December 29	5:00 pm	vs. Baylor*	Reliant Stadium; Houston, TX (Texas Bowl)	ESPN	W 38–14	68,211	
*Non-conference game; ^{†}Homecoming; Rankings from AP Poll released prior to the game; All times are in Central time
