= 2010 Minnesota Golden Gophers football team =

American college football season

2010 Minnesota Golden Gophers football
- Conference: Big Ten Conference
- Record: 3–9 (2–6 Big Ten)
- Head coach: Tim Brewster (4th season; first 7 games); Jeff Horton (interim; remainder of season)
- Offensive coordinator: Jeff Horton (1st season)
- Co-offensive coordinator: Thomas Hammock (1st season)
- Offensive scheme: Pro-style
- Co-defensive coordinators: Kevin Cosgrove (2nd season); Ronnie Lee (2nd season)
- Base defense: 3–4
- Captains: Adam Weber; Jon Hoese; Kim Royston; Brandon Kirksey
- Home stadium: TCF Bank Stadium

2010 Big Ten Conference football standings
	Conf.			Overall
Team	W		L	W		L
No. 14 Michigan State +	7	–	1	11	–	2
No. 7 Wisconsin $+	7	–	1	11	–	2
Iowa	4	–	4	8	–	5
Illinois	4	–	4	7	–	6
Penn State	4	–	4	7	–	6
Michigan	3	–	5	7	–	6
Northwestern	3	–	5	7	–	6
Purdue	2	–	6	4	–	8
Minnesota	2	–	6	3	–	9
Indiana	1	–	7	5	–	7
No. 5 Ohio State† %	0	–	1	0	–	1
$ – BCS representative as conference champion; % – BCS at-large representative; + – Conference co-champions; † – Ohio State (12–1, 7–1) self-vacated all of their wins; Rankings from AP Poll

The 2010 Minnesota Golden Gophers football team represented the University of Minnesota in the 2010 college football season. The Golden Gophers are members of the Big Ten Conference and played their home games at TCF Bank Stadium. The Golden Gophers finished the season 3–9, 2–6 in Big Ten play.

They were led by fourth-year head coach Tim Brewster until his firing on October 17 following a 1–6 start. Offensive coordinator Jeff Horton was tapped as interim head coach for the remainder of the season.

== Schedule ==
Date	Time	Opponent	Site	TV	Result	Attendance	Source
September 2	6:30 pm	at Middle Tennessee*	Johnny "Red" Floyd Stadium; Murfreesboro, TN	ESPNU	W 24–17	25,908	
September 11	11:00 am	South Dakota*	TCF Bank Stadium; Minneapolis, MN	BTN	L 38–41	49,554	
September 18	2:30 pm	USC*	TCF Bank Stadium; Minneapolis, MN	ESPN	L 21–32	50,442	
September 25	7:30 pm	Northern Illinois*	TCF Bank Stadium; Minneapolis, MN	BTN	L 23–34	49,368	
October 2	11:00 am	Northwestern^{†}	TCF Bank Stadium; Minneapolis, MN	ESPN	L 28–29	49,228	
October 9	11:00 am	at No. 19 Wisconsin	Camp Randall Stadium; Madison, WI (rivalry)	BTN	L 23–41	80,328	
October 16	11:00 am	at Purdue	Ross–Ade Stadium; West Lafayette, IN	ESPN2	L 17–28	47,319	
October 23	11:00 am	Penn State	TCF Bank Stadium; Minneapolis, MN (Governor's Victory Bell)	ESPNU	L 21–33	48,479	
October 30	7:00 pm	No. 10 Ohio State	TCF Bank Stadium; Minneapolis, MN	ABC	L 10–52	48,717	
November 6	11:00 am	at No. 15 Michigan State	Spartan Stadium; East Lansing, MI	BTN	L 8–31	71,128	
November 13	11:00 am	at Illinois	Memorial Stadium; Champaign, IL	BTN	W 38–34	55,549	
November 27	2:30 pm	No. 24 Iowa	TCF Bank Stadium; Minneapolis, MN (rivalry)	BTN	W 27–24	50,805	
*Non-conference game; ^{†}Homecoming; Rankings from Coaches' Poll released prior to the game; All times are in Central time
