= Ollie Ogbu =

American gridiron football player and coach (born 1987)

No. 99
- Position: Defensive tackle

Personal information
- Born: May 18, 1987 (age 39); Staten Island, New York, U.S.
- Listed height: 6 ft 2 in (1.88 m)
- Listed weight: 298 lb (135 kg)

Career information
- College: Penn State
- NFL draft: 2011: undrafted

Career history
- Indianapolis Colts (2011–2012)*; Philadelphia Eagles (2012)*; Montreal Alouettes (2012); San Jose SaberCats (2013); Los Angeles Kiss (2014); Hudson Valley Fort (2015– 2016)
- * Offseason or practice squad member only

Awards and highlights
- Second-team All-Big Ten (2010); Freshman All-Big Ten (2007); East West Shrine Game (2010)
- Stats at Pro Football Reference

Olong O. "Ollie" Ogbu (born May 18, 1987) is a defensive line coach for Lake Erie College in Painesville, Ohio. Prior to this year he coached Defensive Line at Wagner College, where he coached 3× All-American 6th round pick DE Titus Leo. Other coaching stints include The University of New Haven, Blinn College & Montana State University- Northern. Previously an American football defensive end for the Spring League and Hudson Valley Fort of the Fall Experimental Football League (FXFL). Before signing with the Indianapolis Colts as an undrafted free agent in 2011, he was a team captain and four-year starter at Penn State.

== Early life ==
At St. Joseph by the Sea High School, Ogbu’s speed and strength on the football field caught the attention of then Penn State assistant coach Brian Norwood, who recruited him to come to Penn State. He spent one year at Milford Academy, where he was named a PrepStar Magazine All-American.

== College career ==
Nicknamed "The Staten Island Ferry" by Penn State Head Coach Joe Paterno when he arrived on campus in 2006, Ogbu redshirted his freshman year. He played in every game of the 2007 season, and was the starter for all but a couple. He finished the season with 18 tackles, 10 tackles-for-loss, one sack, and one forced fumble. He was named to the Sporting News Freshman All-Big Ten team. In 2010 was named All-Big Ten as a Senior for the Nittany Lions.

Ogbu was selected to play in the 86th East-West Shrine Game played on January 22, 2011, at the Citrus Bowl Stadium in Orlando, Florida.

Ogbu earned dual Bachelor of Arts degrees in Crime, Law & Justice, and Sociology from Penn State in 2010. He is a charter member of the Eta Alpha chapter of Iota Phi Theta fraternity.

== Professional career ==
Ogbu was signed as an undrafted free agent by the Indianapolis Colts on July 29, 2011 following the 2011 NFL lockout.

On July 22, 2012, the Colts traded him to the Philadelphia Eagles for cornerback D. J. Johnson.

On October 3, 2012, the CFL's Montreal Alouettes announced his addition to their practice roster, although later in the season, he was added to the active roster and started in three games. He had 7 tackles and a fumble recovery in the three games.

On March 10, 2014, the SaberCats traded him to the Los Angeles Kiss for Marc Schiechl. He was placed on reassignment on May 2, 2014.
