= 2009 Iowa Hawkeyes football team =

American college football season

2009 Iowa Hawkeyes football

Orange Bowl champion

Orange Bowl, W 24–14 vs. Georgia Tech
- Conference: Big Ten Conference

Ranking
- Coaches: No. 7
- AP: No. 7
- Record: 11–2 (6–2 Big Ten)
- Head coach: Kirk Ferentz (11th season)
- Offensive coordinator: Ken O'Keefe (11th season)
- Offensive scheme: Pro-style
- Defensive coordinator: Norm Parker (11th season)
- Base defense: 4–3
- Home stadium: Kinnick Stadium

2009 Big Ten Conference football standings
	Conf.			Overall
Team	W		L	W		L
No. 5 Ohio State $	7	–	1	11	–	2
No. 7 Iowa %	6	–	2	11	–	2
No. 9 Penn State	6	–	2	11	–	2
Northwestern	5	–	3	8	–	5
No. 16 Wisconsin	5	–	3	10	–	3
Michigan State	4	–	4	6	–	7
Purdue	4	–	4	5	–	7
Minnesota	3	–	5	6	–	7
Illinois	2	–	6	3	–	9
Michigan	1	–	7	5	–	7
Indiana	1	–	7	4	–	8
$ – BCS representative as conference champion; % – BCS at-large representative; Rankings from AP Poll

The 2009 Iowa Hawkeyes football team represented the University of Iowa and the Iowa Hawkeyes athletic program during the 2009 NCAA Division I FBS football season. The team played its home games at Kinnick Stadium in Iowa City, Iowa. 2009 marked Kirk Ferentz's 11th year as head coach of Iowa. The Hawkeyes finished the season as the 2010 Orange Bowl Champions.

The Hawkeyes came off a 9–4 season in 2008, including a win over South Carolina in the Outback Bowl and a 24–23 upset of Big Ten champion of Penn State.

== Schedule ==
Date	Time	Opponent	Rank	Site	TV	Result	Attendance
September 5	11:00 am	Northern Iowa*	No. 22	Kinnick Stadium; Iowa City, Iowa	BTN	W 17–16	70,585
September 12	11:00 am	at Iowa State*		Jack Trice Stadium; Ames, Iowa (Cy-Hawk Trophy)	FSN	W 35–3	52,089
September 19	2:30 pm	Arizona*		Kinnick Stadium; Iowa City, Iowa	ABC/ESPN2	W 27–17	70,585
September 26	7:00 pm	at No. 5 Penn State		Beaver Stadium; State College, Pennsylvania (College GameDay)	ABC	W 21–10	109,316
October 3	11:00 am	Arkansas State*	No. 13	Kinnick Stadium; Iowa City, Iowa	ESPN2	W 24–21	67,989
October 10	7:00 pm	Michigan^{†}	No. 12	Kinnick Stadium; Iowa City, Iowa	ABC	W 30–28	70,585
October 17	11:00 am	at Wisconsin	No. 11	Camp Randall Stadium; Madison, Wisconsin (Heartland Trophy)	ESPN	W 20–10	81,043
October 24	6:00 pm	at Michigan State	No. 6	Spartan Stadium; East Lansing, Michigan	BTN	W 15–13	74,411
October 31	11:00 am	Indiana	No. 4	Kinnick Stadium; Iowa City, Iowa	ESPN	W 42–24	70,585
November 7	11:00 am	Northwestern	No. 4	Kinnick Stadium; Iowa City, Iowa	ESPN	L 10–17	70,585
November 14	2:30 pm	at No. 11 Ohio State	No. 10	Ohio Stadium; Columbus, Ohio	ABC/ESPN	L 24–27 ^{OT}	105,455
November 21	11:00 am	Minnesota	No. 13	Kinnick Stadium; Iowa City, Iowa (Floyd of Rosedale)	ESPN	W 12–0	70,585
January 5	7:00 pm	vs. No. 9 Georgia Tech*	No. 10	Land Shark Stadium; Miami Gardens, Florida (Orange Bowl)	FOX	W 24–14	66,131
*Non-conference game; ^{†}Homecoming; Rankings from AP Poll (Preseason-Oct. 11), Bowl Championship Series (after Oct. 18); All times are in Central time

== Rankings ==
Ranking movements Legend: ██ Increase in ranking ██ Decrease in ranking — = Not ranked
	Week															
Poll	Pre	1	2	3	4	5	6	7	8	9	10	11	12	13	14	Final
AP	22	—	—	—	13	12	11	7	7	8	15	15	13	9	10	7
Coaches	21	—	—	—	17	14	12	8	8	6	13	15	13	10	11	7
Harris	Not released				14	11	11	7	8	7	12	14	13	10	11	Not released
BCS	Not released							6	4	4	10	13	11	9	10	Not released

== Roster ==
2009 Iowa Hawkeyes football team roster
Players
Coaches
Offense

Pos.	#	Name	Class
QB	12	Ricky Stanzi	Jr
QB	16	James Vandenberg	Fr
QB	14	John Wienke	Fr
RB	37	Shane Dibona	Fr
RB	27	Jewel Hampton (injured)	So
RB	47	Wade Leppert	So
RB	36	Brett Morse	Jr
RB	25	Paki O'Meara	Jr
RB	32	Adam Robinson	Fr
RB	38	Brad Rogers	Fr
RB	3	Brandon Wegher	Fr
WR	26	Paul Chaney Jr.	Jr
WR	23	Jordan Cotton	Fr
WR	6	Keenan Davis	Fr
WR	15	Derrell Johnson-Koulianos	Jr
WR	7	Marvin McNutt	So
WR	22	Colin Sandeman	Jr
WR	86	Trey Stross	Sr
TE	31	Zach Derby	Fr
TE	88	J. D. Griggs	Fr
TE	39	Brad Herman	So
TE	81	Tony Moeaki	Sr
TE	82	Allen Reisner	Jr
OL	79	Bryan Bulaga	Jr
OL	60	Kyle Calloway	Sr
OL	74	Dan Doering	Sr
OL	52	Rafael Eubanks	Sr
OL	53	James Ferentz	Fr
OL	73	Adam Gettis	So
OL	77	Riley Reiff	Fr
OL	78	Dace Richardson	Sr
OL	63	Julian Vandervelde	Jr
OL	56	Markus Zusevics	So

Defense

Pos.	#	Name	Class
DL	79	Dominic Alvis	Fr
DL	46	Christian Ballard	Jr
DL	91	Broderick Binns	So
DL	94	Adrian Clayborn	Jr
DL	93	Mike Daniels	So
DL	95	Karl Klug	Jr
LB	43	Pat Angerer	Sr
LB	44	Jeff Brinson	Fr
LB	49	A. J. Edds	Sr
LB	42	Jeremiha Hunter	Jr
LB	48	Troy Johnson	Jr
LB	45	Tyler Nielsen	So
LB	33	Jeff Tarpinian	Jr
DB	4	Jordan Bernstine	Jr
DB	2	Greg Castillo	Fr
DB	13	Tom Donatell	So
DB	30	Brett Greenwood	Sr
DB	18	Micah Hyde	Fr
DB	10	William Lowe	So
DB	28	Shaun Prater	So
DB	9	Tyler Sash	So
DB	19	Amari Spievey	Jr

Special teams

Pos.	#	Name	Class
K	8	Trent Mossbrucker	So
K	1	Daniel Murray	Jr
P	5	Ryan Donahue	Jr
LS	69	Charlie Knipper	Fr
LS	65	Andrew Schulze	Jr

Head coach

- Kirk Ferentz

Coordinators/assistant coaches

- Ken O'Keefe – Offensive Coordinator and Quarterbacks
- Norm Parker – Defensive Coordinator
- Phil Parker – Defensive Backs
- LeVar Woods – Assistant
- Chris Doyle – Strength and Conditioning

Legend

- (C) Team captain
- (S) Suspended
- (I) Ineligible
- Injured
- Redshirt

Roster

== Game summaries ==
=== Northern Iowa ===
Northern Iowa at #22 Iowa

Team	1	2	3	4	Total
Panthers	3	7	3	3	16
• #22/21 Hawkeyes	3	0	7	7	17

- Date: September 5
- Location: Kinnick Stadium, Iowa City, Iowa
- Game start: 11:01 a.m. CDT CDT
- Game attendance: 70,585
- Game weather: 70 °F (21 °C) (Sunny)
- Referee: Dennis Lipski
- TV announcers (Big Ten Network): Tom Werme, Anthony Herron, and Elizabeth Moreau
- Source: Box Score Archived 2016-11-28 at the Wayback Machine

Scoring summary
1	9:17	Iowa	Daniel Murray 39-yard field goal	Iowa 3-0
1	4:22	UNI	Billy Hallgren 39-yard field goal	Tied 3-3
2	5:40	UNI	Ryan Mahaffey 14-yard pass from Pat Grace (Billy Hallgren kick)	UNI 10-3
3	12:27	UNI	Billy Hallgren 34-yard field goal	UNI 13-3
3	9:41	Iowa	Adam Robinson 11-yard run (Daniel Murray kick)	UNI 13-10
4	13:18	Iowa	Tony Moeaki 6-yard pass from Ricky Stanzi (Daniel Murray kick)	Iowa 17-13
4	4:26	UNI	Billy Hallgren 39-yard field goal	Iowa 17-16

The Hawkeyes struggled early, gaining just 104 yards of total offense in the first half. After trading field goals, UNI took a 10–3 lead after quarterback Pat Grace threw a 14-yard touchdown pass to Ryan Mahaffey. The Hawkeyes woke up in the second half, going 70 yards in six plays and getting an 11-yard touchdown run from Adam Robinson with under 10 minutes remaining in the third quarter. Iowa would regain the lead early in the fourth quarter when Tony Moeaki caught a touchdown pass from Ricky Stanzi.

After a Billy Hallgren field goal, the Panthers threatened late in the game, with Grace leading them down the field in the final minutes to set up a potential game-winning kick and an upset. Hallgren's first attempt was blocked, but the officials ruled the ball went behind the line of scrimmage and UNI recovered with one second left. Jeremiha Hunter blocked the second kick, sealing the victory for the Hawkeyes. This was the first time in FBS history that a team had blocked two field goals on consecutive plays.

Despite the win, Iowa's struggle against a Football Championship Subdivision opponent knocked them out of both the Associated Press and USA Today Top 25 polls until their upset of #5 Penn State at the end of the month.

=== at Iowa State ===
Iowa at Iowa State

Team	1	2	3	4	Total
• Hawkeyes	7	7	14	7	35
Cyclones	3	0	0	0	3

- Date: September 12
- Location: Jack Trice Stadium, Ames, Iowa
- Game start: 11:05 a.m.
- Game attendance: 52,089
- Game weather: 72 °F (22 °C) (Mostly Hazy)
- Referee: Dave Witvoet
- TV announcers (FSN): Joel Meyers, Dave Lapham, and Jim Knox
- Source: Box Score Archived 2016-11-28 at the Wayback Machine

Scoring summary
1	2:33	Iowa St	Grant Mahoney 46-yard field goal	Iowa St 3-0
1	1:43	Iowa	Grant Morse 1-yard pass from Ricky Stanzi (Daniel Murray kick)	Iowa 7-3
2	2:56	Iowa	Derrell Johnson-Koulianos 18-yard pass from Ricky Stanzi (Daniel Murray kick)	Iowa 14-3
3	9:25	Iowa	Allen Reisner 7-yard pass from Ricky Stanzi (Daniel Murray kick)	Iowa 21-3
3	4:27	Iowa	Brandon Wegher 1-yard run (Daniel Murray kick)	Iowa 28-3
4	5:49	Iowa	Keenan Davis 10-yard pass from Ricky Stanzi (Daniel Murray kick)	Iowa 35-3

The Cyclones scored first with a 46-yard field goal from Grant Mahoney in the first quarter. But Iowa was able to capitalize on good field position resulting from an onside kick attempt by Iowa State and took the lead for good on a one-yard pass from Ricky Stanzi to Brett Morse. The Hawkeyes benefitted from six turnovers, scoring four more touchdowns off Cyclone mistakes. Tyler Sash had three of Iowa's five interceptions, tying a school record.

=== Arizona ===
Arizona at Iowa

Team	1	2	3	4	Total
Wildcats	7	3	0	7	17
• Hawkeyes	7	7	3	10	27

- Date: September 19
- Location: Kinnick Stadium, Iowa City, Iowa
- Game start: 2:36 p.m.
- Game attendance: 70,585
- Game weather: 76 °F (24 °C) (Partly Cloudy)
- Referee: Dan Capron
- TV announcers (ABC/ESPN2): Mike Patrick, Craig James, and Heather Cox
- Source: Box Score Archived 2016-11-28 at the Wayback Machine

Scoring summary
1	10:49	Iowa	Adam Robinson 2-yard run (Daniel Murray kick)	Iowa 7-0
1	6:57	Ariz	Trevin Wade 38-yard interception return (Alex Zendejas kick)	Tied 7-7
2	9:55	Ariz	Alex Zendejas 20-yard field goal	Arizona 10-7
2	6:28	Iowa	Adam Robinson 1-yard run (Daniel Murray kick)	Iowa 14-10
3	1:47	Iowa	Daniel Murray 20-yard field goal	Iowa 17-10
4	14:52	Iowa	Daniel Murray 40-yard field goal	Iowa 20-10
4	4:40	Iowa	Brandon Wegher 2-yard run (Daniel Murray kick)	Iowa 27-10
4	1:53	Ariz	Juron Criner 10-yard pass from Nick Foles (Alex Zendejas kick)	Iowa 27-17

The Hawkeyes scored on the opening drive, with a 2-yard touchdown run by Adam Robinson. But Arizona tied the score at 7 after Trevin Wade returned a Ricky Stanzi interception 38 yards into the end zone. Iowa's defense would again prove to be the difference-maker in this game, not allowing a touchdown until 1:53 was remaining in the game, with the Hawkeyes well ahead. Tyler Sash also netted his seventh interception in five games (dating back to last year).

=== at No. 5 Penn State ===
Iowa at #5 Penn State

Team	1	2	3	4	Total
• Hawkeyes	0	5	0	16	21
#5/4 Nittany Lions	10	0	0	0	10

- Date: September 12
- Location: Beaver Stadium, State College, Pennsylvania
- Game start: 7:12 p.m. CDT
- Elapsed time: 3:08
- Game attendance: 109,316
- Game weather: 52–56 °F (11–13 °C), Rainy and cool, Wind SSE 5–10 mph (8.0–16.1 km/h)
- Referee: J. O'Neil
- TV announcers (ABC): Brent Musburger, Kirk Herbstreit, and Lisa Salters
- Source: Box Score Archived 2016-11-28 at the Wayback Machine

Scoring summary
1	13:15	Penn St	Powell 79-yard pass from Clark (Wagner kick)	Penn St 7-0
1	0:52	Penn St	Wagner 27-yard field goal	Penn St 10-0
2	11:47	IOWA	Team Safety	Penn St 10-2
2	4:41	IOWA	Murray 41-yard field goal	Penn St 10-5
4	12:21	IOWA	A. Clayborn 53-yard blocked punt return (Stanzi pass failed)	Iowa 11-10
4	8:32	IOWA	A. Robinson 13-yard run (Murray kick)	Iowa 18-10
4	0:08	IOWA	Murray 31-yard field goal	Iowa 21-10

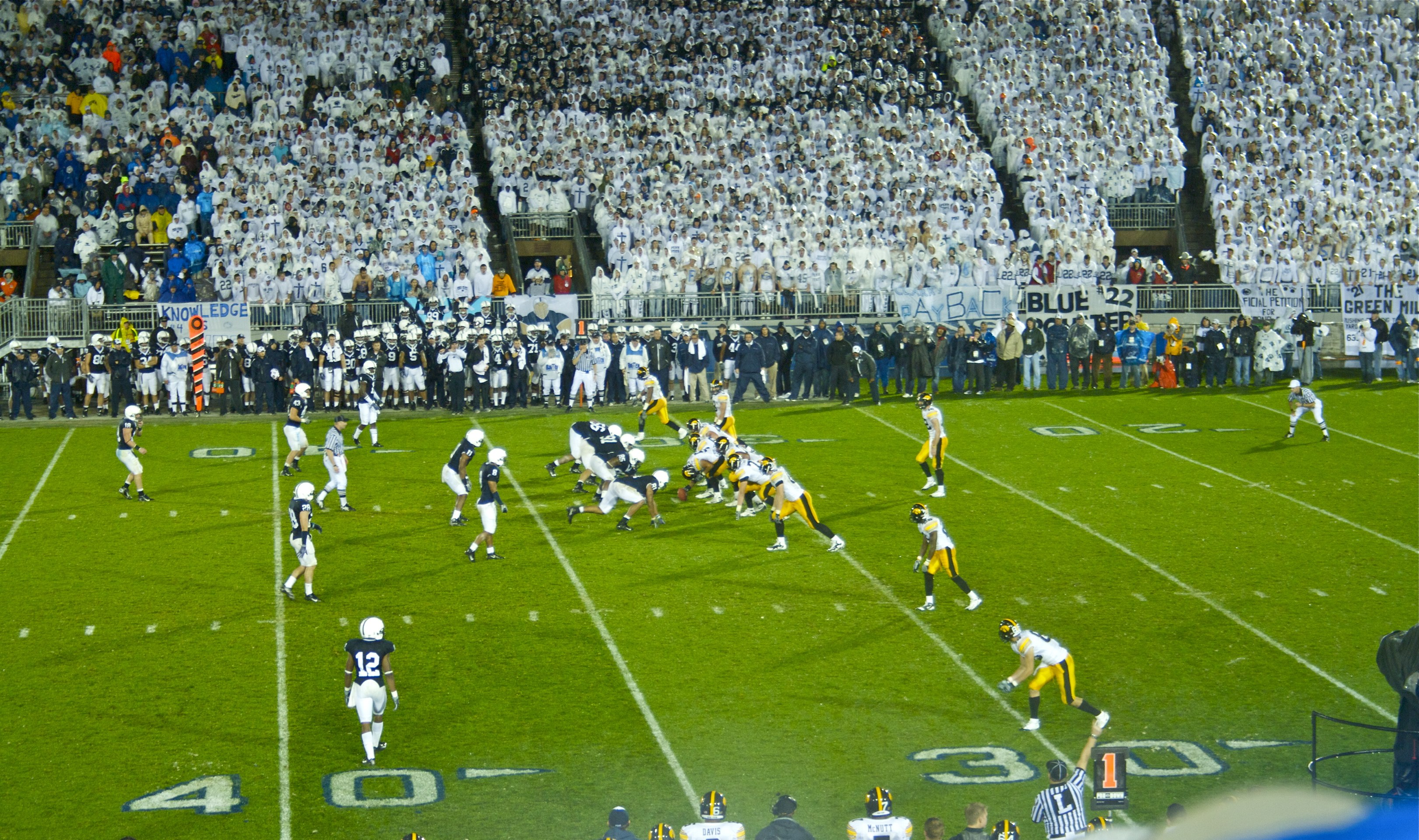
Iowa's offense lines up against the Penn State defense

ESPN's College GameDay was in State College for the Saturday night Big Ten opener. The Hawkeyes fell behind early, 10–0, after a 79-yard pass from Daryll Clark to Chaz Powell on Penn State's first play from scrimmage and then a 20-play drive by the Nittany Lions that led to a Collin Wagner field goal. But Iowa would score 21 unanswered points after that to stun Penn State for the second consecutive year. The defense shut down the Nittany Lions in the final three quarters, forcing four turnovers, and the turning point in the game came when Penn State punted, clinging to a 10–5 lead in the fourth quarter, Adrian Clayborn blocked a punt and ran it back 53 yards for a touchdown to give the Hawkeyes the lead. With the momentum changed, they were more easily able to move the ball on their final two drives. For many Penn State fans, the way the game played out reminded them of the games from their dismal 3–9 (1–7) season with many close losses in 2003, but for many Iowa fans, the way the game played out also brought back memories of 2003, reminding them of their 2003 season where they finished #8 in the nation and beat Penn State 26–14 at home, during a span of three years (2002, 2003, 2004) where they were #8 for three consecutive years and won a share of the conference championship in two of those years (2002 and 2004).

The win at Penn State on prime-time network television catapulted Iowa to a number 13 ranking in the AP Poll and a number 17 ranking in the Coaches' Poll. At year's end, it would also prove to be a selling point for choosing the Hawkeyes over the Nittany Lions for an at-large bid in the Bowl Championship Series.

=== Arkansas State ===
Arkansas State at #13 Iowa

Team	1	2	3	4	Total
Red Wolves	0	7	0	14	21
• #13/17 Hawkeyes	14	0	7	3	24

- Date: October 3
- Location: Kinnick Stadium, Iowa City, Iowa
- Game start: 11:02 a.m. CDT
- Elapsed time: 3:11
- Game attendance: 67,989
- Game weather: 50 °F (10 °C), Cloudy, Wind WNW 11 mph (18 km/h)
- Referee: Dennis Lipski
- TV announcers (ESPN2): Pam Ward and Ray Bentley
- Source: Box Score Archived 2016-11-28 at the Wayback Machine

Scoring summary
1	12:16	Iowa	Trey Stross 33-yard pass from Ricky Stanzi (Daniel Murray kick)	Iowa 7-0
1	6:55	Iowa	Marvin McNutt 41-yard pass from Ricky Stanzi (Daniel Murray kick)	Iowa 14-0
2	0:44	Ark St	B. Thompkins 12-yard pass from Corey Leonard (Josh Arauco kick)	Iowa 14-7
3	13:16	Iowa	Marvin McNutt 43-yard pass from Ricky Stanzi (Daniel Murray kick)	Iowa 21-7
4	14:41	Ark St	Demario Davis 75-yard interception return (Josh Arauco kick)	Iowa 21-14
4	10:00	Iowa	Daniel Murray 20-yard field goal	Iowa 24-14
4	2:01	Ark St	Trevor Gillott 4-yard pass from Corey Leonard (Josh Arauco kick)	Iowa 24-21

Iowa jumped out to a 14–0 lead behind two touchdown passes by Ricky Stanzi. Unlike Stanzi, the offense would stall, however, which allowed the Red Wolves back into the game before the first half ended, with quarterback Corey Leonard connecting with Brandon Thompkins for a score. The Hawks would answer back in the second half, as Tyler Sash's fifth interception on the year set up a 43-yard TD pass from Stanzi to Marvin McNutt.

Stanzi was then picked off twice, the second interception going 75 yards for a touchdown (Stanzi's 2nd pick-six this year). Daniel Murray extended the lead to 10 with a 20-yard field goal, but Arkansas State wouldn't go away. They took the ball 68 yards in a 17 plays and nearly 8 minutes to close the gap within 3. The Hawkeyes would hold on though to improve their record to 5–0, with Michigan coming to town in a prime-time national telecast next.

=== Michigan ===
Michigan at #12 Iowa

Team	1	2	3	4	Total
Wolverines	14	0	7	7	28
• #12/14 Hawkeyes	10	10	3	7	30

- Date: October 10
- Location: Kinnick Stadium, Iowa City, Iowa
- Game start: 7:12 p.m. CDT
- Elapsed time: 3:17
- Game attendance: 70,585
- Game weather: 33 °F (1 °C) (Partly Cloudy)
- Referee: Todd Geerlings
- TV announcers (ABC): Brent Musburger, Kirk Herbstreit, and Lisa Salters
- Source: Box Score Archived 2017-09-04 at the Wayback Machine

Scoring summary
1	14:14	Mich	D. Warren 40-yard interception return (Olesnavage kick)	Mich 7-0
1	9:20	Iowa	Tony Moeaki 34-yard pass from Ricky Stanzi (Daniel Murray kick)	Tied 7-7
1	5:55	Iowa	D. Murray 28-yard field goal	Iowa 10-7
1	1:12	Mich	B. Minor 3-yard run (Olesnavage kick)	Mich 14-10
2	12:50	Iowa	D. Murray 41-yard field goal	Mich 14-13
2	5:49	Iowa	B. Wegher 1-yard run (Murray kick)	Iowa 20-14
3	10:45	Iowa	D. Murray 40-yard field goal	Iowa 23-14
3	4:23	Mich	B. Minor 1-yard run (Olesnavage kick)	Iowa 23-21
4	12:56	Iowa	Tony Moeaki 34-yard pass from Ricky Stanzi (Daniel Murray kick)	Iowa 30-21
4	3:16	Mich	D. Robinson 3-yard run (Olesnavage kick)	Iowa 30-28

The scoring began with Stanzi's third pick-six of the year, with cornerback Donovan Warren taking the intercepted pass 40 yards to give Michigan an early 7–0 lead. Iowa would respond, however, with Stanzi finding tight end Tony Moeaki for a touchdown to cap a nine-play, 57-yard drive. The Wolverines committed five turnovers to the Hawkeyes' one, the most crucial being an interception by Brett Greenwood with 46 seconds remaining in the game to seal Iowa's 10th consecutive victory, the second-longest winning streak in the nation behind Florida.

=== at Wisconsin ===
#11 Iowa at Wisconsin

Team	1	2	3	4	Total
• #11 Hawkeyes	0	3	7	10	20
Badgers	0	10	0	0	10

- Date: October 17
- Location: Camp Randall Stadium, Madison, Wisconsin
- Game start: 11:02 a.m. CDT
- Elapsed time: 2:46
- Game attendance: 81,043
- Game weather: 40 °F (4 °C) (Partly Cloudy)
- Referee: John O'Neill
- TV announcers (ESPN): Dave Pasch, Bob Griese, and Chris Spielman
- Source: Box Score Archived 2017-09-04 at the Wayback Machine

Scoring summary
2	14:53	Wisc	Welch 34-yard field goal	Wisc 3-0
2	8:09	Wisc	Montee Ball 10-yard run (Welch kick)	Wisc 10-0
2	5:25	Iowa	D. Murray 33-yard field goal	Wisc 10-3
3	7:58	Iowa	Tony Moeaki 24-yard pass from Ricky Stanzi (Daniel Murray kick)	Tied 10-10
4	13:15	Iowa	Adam Robinson 10-yard run (Daniel Murray kick)	Iowa 17-10
4	5:17	Iowa	Daniel Murray 48-yard field goal	Iowa 20-10

After a scoreless first quarter, the Badgers jumped to a 10–0 lead after freshman running back Montee Ball scored from 10 yards out. Then, in a scene reminiscent of Iowa's effort at Penn State three weeks earlier, the Hawks rattled off 20 unanswered points, while the defense intercepted Wisconsin QB Scott Tolzien three times. Also similar to the win over Penn State, Tolzien was picked off two times on Wisconsin's final drives that threatened to put Wisconsin in the game again. Unlike that night, Iowa was not trailing in the 4th quarter, they took a 17–10 lead early in the 4th and nearly scored once more up 20–10 in the red zone, but couldn't convert a 4th down. Despite this, the 10-point lead was more than enough for the Hawkeyes to win.

The win, paired with Ohio State's loss at Purdue, gave Iowa sole possession of first place in the Big Ten.

=== at Michigan State ===
#6 Iowa at Michigan State

Team	1	2	3	4	Total
• #6 Hawkeyes	0	3	0	12	15
Spartans	3	0	3	7	13

- Date: October 24
- Location: Spartan Stadium, East Lansing, Michigan
- Game start: 7:02 p.m. EDT
- Game attendance: 74,411
- Game weather: 43 °F (6 °C) (Overcast)
- Referee: Bill LeMonnier
- TV announcers (BTN): Wayne Larrivee, Chris Martin, and Lisa Byington
- Source: Box Score Archived 2017-09-04 at the Wayback Machine

Scoring summary
1	3:39	MSU	Brett Swenson 34-yard field goal	MSU 3-0
2	12:44	Iowa	Daniel Murray 37-yard field goal	Tied 3-3
3	5:21	MSU	Brett Swenson 20-yard field goal	MSU 6-3
4	11:43	Iowa	Daniel Murray 20-yard field goal	Tied 6-6
4	2:56	Iowa	Daniel Murray 20-yard field goal	Iowa 9-6
4	1:37	MSU	Blair White 30-yard pass from Kirk Cousins (Swenson kick)	MSU 13-9
4	0:00	Iowa	Marvin McNutt 7-yard pass from Ricky Stanzi	Iowa 15-13

It was a defensive battle for 58 minutes, with both teams getting very close to the goal line, only to come away with field goals. Down 9–6 in the fourth quarter, the Spartans scored on a 30-yard touchdown pass from Kirk Cousins to Blair White with 1:37 left in the game. But the Hawkeyes would respond by taking the ball down the field. Finally, on 4th and goal at the 7-yard line with 2 seconds remaining, Ricky Stanzi connected with Marvin McNutt for the game-winning touchdown.

The win gave the Hawkeyes its best start in school history at 8–0.

=== Indiana ===
Indiana at #4 Iowa

Team	1	2	3	4	Total
Indiana	7	14	3	0	24
• #4 Iowa	0	7	7	28	42

- Date: October 31
- Location: Kinnick Stadium, Iowa City, Iowa
- Game start: 11:02 a.m. CDT
- Elapsed time: 3:23
- Game attendance: 70,585
- Game weather: 41 °F (5 °C), Partly Sunny, Wind WNW 17 mph (27 km/h)
- Referee: Ron Torbert
- TV announcers (ESPN): Mark Jones and Bob Davie
- Source: Box Score Archived 2016-11-27 at the Wayback Machine

Scoring summary
1	9:59	Ind	Willis 4-yard run (Freeland kick)	Indiana 7–0
2	5:00	Ind	Evans 16-yard pass from Chappell (Freeland kick)	Indiana 14-0
2	2:39	IOWA	B. Wegher 4-yard run (Murray kick)	Indiana 14-7
2	0:09	Ind	Belcher 9-yard pass from Chappell (Freeland kick)	Indiana 21-7
3	7:45	IOWA	T. Sash 86-yard interception return (Murray kick)	Indiana 21-14
3	2:05	Ind	Freeland 37-yard field goal	Indiana 24-14
4	13:03	IOWA	M. McNutt 92-yard pass from R. Stanzi (Murray kick)	Indiana 24-21
4	11:38	IOWA	D. Johnson-Koulianos 66-yard pass from R. Stanzi (Murray kick)	IOWA 28-24
4	7:34	IOWA	B. Wegher 6-yard run (Murray kick)	IOWA 35-24
4	1:12	IOWA	B. Wegher 27-yard run (Murray kick)	IOWA 42-24

The Hawkeyes' perfect season and hopes at a national championship were in serious jeopardy for three quarters, as Indiana went into the locker room ahead 21–7 at the half thanks to an opening-drive score and special teams miscues by the Hawkeyes (a 9-yard punt and a fumble on a punt return deep in Iowa territory). The Hoosiers looked to extend the lead to three scores when Tyler Sash somehow managed to intercept a Ben Chappell pass and take it 86 yards the other way for a touchdown.

Ricky Stanzi had perhaps his worst game as Iowa's quarterback, throwing five interceptions, four in the third quarter as the Hawkeye offense played into a strong wind from the north. He and his team were able to recover in the fourth quarter, however, as Stanzi found Marvin McNutt for a 92-yard touchdown pass then on the next offensive play, connected with Derrell Johnson-Koulianos for a score from 66 yards out that would put Iowa up for good.

In all, the Hawkeyes scored 28 unanswered points in the final 15 minutes after trailing 24–14 to improve their record to 9–0.

=== Northwestern ===
Northwestern at #4 Iowa

Team	1	2	3	4	Total
• Wildcats	0	14	0	3	17
#4 Hawkeyes	10	0	0	0	10

- Date: November 7
- Location: Kinnick Stadium, Iowa City, Iowa
- Game start: 11:02 a.m. CST
- Elapsed time: 3:00
- Game attendance: 70,585
- Game weather: 63 °F (17 °C) (Sunny)
- Referee: Dennis Lipski
- TV announcers (ESPN): Dave Pasch, Bob Griese, and Chris Spielman
- Source: Box Score Archived 2017-09-04 at the Wayback Machine

Scoring summary
1	14:00	Iowa	Marvin McNutt 74-yard pass from Ricky Stanzi (Daniel Murray kick)	Iowa 7-0
1	9:50	Iowa	Daniel Murray 39-yard field goal	Iowa 10-0
2	11:46	NW	M. Thomas fumble recovery in end zone (Stefan Demos kick)	Iowa 10-7
2	5:20	NW	D. Dunsmore 4-yard pass from Dan Persa (Stefan Demos kick)	NW 14-10
4	13:29	NW	Stefan Demos 47-yard field goal	NW 17-10

In the first quarter, Ricky Stanzi quickly rattled off 10 points for the Iowa offense, putting them in the lead early. However, those would be the only points the Hawkeyes would score all day, and, as the second quarter drew to a close, the Hawkeyes would find themselves without their starting quarterback, as Stanzi went down with a high ankle sprain, effectively ending his season, and forcing untested backup, freshman James Vandenberg into the spotlight.

The spotlight would prove to be too much for Vandenberg, as he could never mount an effective enough drive to overcome the suddenly mounting score. Iowa would eventually lose the game and their number 4 ranking in the BCS poll.

=== at No. 11 Ohio State ===
#10 Iowa at #11 Ohio State

Team	1	2	3	4	OT	Total
#10 Hawkeyes	3	0	7	14	0	24
• #11 Buckeyes	0	10	0	14	3	27

- Date: November 14
- Location: Ohio Stadium, Columbus, Ohio
- Game start: 3:37 p.m. EST
- Elapsed time: 3:06
- Game attendance: 105,455
- Game weather: 65 °F (18 °C) (Clear Skies)
- Referee: Todd Geerlings
- TV announcers (ABC/ESPN): Sean McDonough, Matt Millen, and Holly Rowe
- Source: Box Score Archived 2017-09-04 at the Wayback Machine

Scoring summary
1	0:53	Iowa	Daniel Murray 32-yard field goal	Iowa 3-0
2	7:01	Ohio St	Devin Barclay 30-yard field goal	Tied 3-3
2	2:04	Ohio St	Brandon Saine 22-yard run (Barclay kick)	Ohio St 10-3
3	3:31	Iowa	Marvin McNutt 9-yard pass from James Vandenberg (Murray kick)	Tied 10-10
4	13:03	Ohio St	Dan Herron 11-yard run (Barclay kick)	Ohio St 17-10
4	11:11	Ohio St	Brandon Saine 49-yard run (Barclay kick)	Ohio St 24-10
4	10:56	Iowa	D. Johnson-Koulianos 99-yard kick return (Murray kick)	Ohio St 24-17
4	2:42	Iowa	Marvin McNutt 10-yard pass from James Vandenberg (Murray kick)	Tied 24-24
OT	-:--	Ohio St	Devin Barclay 39-yard field goal	Ohio St 27-24

Devin Barclay kicked a 39-yard field goal in overtime to defeat the injured but spirited Iowa Hawkeyes 27-24. James Vandenberg would make his first start in place of injured Ricky Stanzi in this battle for the Big Ten championship and the conference's automatic bid, which would put the winner in the Rose Bowl. Vandenberg showed remarkable poise playing such a big game in a tough environment in Columbus, completing 20 of his 33 passes for two touchdowns, including the game-tying score to Marvin McNutt with 2:42 left in regulation. Derrell Johnson-Koulianos also helped in the Hawks' comeback with a 99-yard kickoff return for a touchdown after Ohio State extended its lead to 24–10 on a 49-yard Brandon Saine run following a Vandenberg interception. Iowa would not score in its overtime possession however.

=== Minnesota ===
Minnesota at #13 Iowa
Floyd of Rosedale

Team	1	2	3	4	Total
Golden Gophers	0	0	0	0	0
• #13 Hawkeyes	3	6	3	0	12

- Date: November 21
- Location: Kinnick Stadium
  Iowa City, IA
- Game start: 11:02 a.m. CST
- Elapsed time: 3:08
- Game attendance: 70,585
- Game weather: 45 °F (7 °C), Partly Cloudy, Wind SSE 5 mph (8.0 km/h)
- Referee: John O'Neill
- TV announcers (ESPN): Dave Pasch and Bob Griese
- Sources: Box score Archived 2016-11-27 at the Wayback Machine

Scoring summary
1	9:56	Iowa	Daniel Murray 30-yard field goal	Iowa 3–0
2	0:52	Iowa	Brandon Wegher 1-yard run (Murray kick blocked)	Iowa 9-0
3	7:10	Iowa	Daniel Murray 45-yard field goal	Iowa 12-0

It was a battle of defenses on Senior Day in Iowa City, as both the Hawkeyes and Gophers combined for 372 total yards and 17 punts, more than the total number of points. The game's lone touchdown came on a 1-yard run by Brandon Wegher with 52 seconds left in the first half. The Hawkeye defense also turned the Gophers away after having four chances to make it a game with the ball on Iowa's 2-yard line.

With the win, Iowa finished the regular season at 10–2 and a final BCS ranking of number 10. On December 6, 2009, they were selected to play the Atlantic Coast Conference champion Georgia Tech Yellow Jackets at the 2010 Orange Bowl in Miami Gardens, Florida on January 5, marking the Hawkeyes' second postseason visit to South Florida in seven years.

=== vs. No. 9 Georgia Tech (Orange Bowl) ===
#10 Iowa vs. #9 Georgia Tech

Team	1	2	3	4	Total
• #10 Hawkeyes	14	0	3	7	24
#9 Yellow Jackets	7	0	0	7	14

- Date: January 5, 2010
- Location: Land Shark Stadium, Miami Gardens, Florida
- Game start: 8:22 p.m. EST
- Elapsed time: 3:14
- Game attendance: 66,131
- Game weather: 49 °F (9 °C) (Clear)
- Referee: Steve Shaw
- TV announcers (FOX/ESPN Radio): Dick Stockton, Charles Davis, Chris Myers, and Laura Okmin/Sean McDonough, Matt Millen, & Holly Rowe
- Source: Box Score Archived 2017-09-04 at the Wayback Machine

Scoring summary
1	8:10	Iowa	Marvin McNutt 4-yard pass from Ricky Stanzi (Murray kick)	Iowa 7-0
1	4:04	Iowa	Colin Sandeman 21-yard pass from Ricky Stanzi (Murray kick)	Iowa 14-0
1	0:24	GT	J. Tarrant 40-yard interception return (Blair kick)	Iowa 14-7
3	2:17	Iowa	Daniel Murray 33-yard field goal	Iowa 17-7
4	12:30	GT	A. Allen 1-yard run (Blair kick)	Iowa 17-14
4	1:56	Iowa	B. Wegher 32-yard run (Murray kick)	Iowa 24-14

The Hawkeyes came into the 76th Orange Bowl as underdogs to Georgia Tech, but were able to set the tempo at the very beginning. The Hawkeyes brought a piece of Iowa with them to South Florida, the temperature was 49 °F (9 °C) at kickoff, making it the coldest Orange Bowl on record. After a Marvin McNutt fumble on the game's opening drive led to good field position for the Yellow Jackets' dangerous triple-option attack, the Iowa defense was able to force a 3-and-out.

On the next two offensive drives, quarterback Ricky Stanzi, who had surgery to repair a ligament tear that was a result of his injury against Northwestern, led the Hawkeyes into the end zone, throwing a 3-yard touchdown pass to Marvin McNutt and a 21-yard pass to Colin Sandeman to give Iowa the early 14–0 advantage. But as he had done three times already in 2009, Stanzi also threw an interception that resulted in six points for the other team, with Jerrard Tarrant scoring from 40 yards on the return.

After getting manhandled in the first half, Georgia Tech's offense would wake up, getting into scoring position on their first drive but unable to put points on the board, then getting a one-yard score from Anthony Allen to cap an 11-play, 71-yard drive and bring the Jackets to within a field goal.

Norm Parker's defense, however, was once again able to stop Tech after that, and a 32-yard touchdown by Brandon Wegher with 1:56 remaining would seal Iowa's first major bowl victory since the 1959 Rose Bowl.

Defensive end Adrian Clayborn, who announced he would return to the Hawkeyes next season, was named the Orange Bowl's Most Valuable Player. He had 9 tackles and 2 sacks. The Iowa defense limited Georgia Tech to 143 yards rushing, less than half of their average for the season.

== Players in the 2010 NFL draft ==
Player	Position	Round	Pick	NFL club	Ref
Bryan Bulaga	Tackle	1	23	Green Bay Packers	
Pat Angerer	Linebacker	2	63	Indianapolis Colts	
Amari Spievey	Cornerback	3	66	Detroit Lions	
Tony Moeaki	Tight End	3	93	Kansas City Chiefs	
A. J. Edds	Linebacker	4	119	Miami Dolphins	
Kyle Calloway	Tackle	7	216	Buffalo Bills	
