= 2010 Iowa Hawkeyes football team =

American college football season

2010 Iowa Hawkeyes football

Insight Bowl champion

Insight Bowl, W 27–24 vs. Missouri
- Conference: Big Ten Conference
- Record: 8–5 (4–4 Big Ten)
- Head coach: Kirk Ferentz (12th season)
- Offensive coordinator: Ken O'Keefe (12th season)
- Offensive scheme: Pro-style
- Defensive coordinator: Norm Parker (12th season)
- Base defense: 4–3
- Home stadium: Kinnick Stadium

2010 Big Ten Conference football standings
	Conf.			Overall
Team	W		L	W		L
No. 14 Michigan State +	7	–	1	11	–	2
No. 7 Wisconsin $+	7	–	1	11	–	2
Iowa	4	–	4	8	–	5
Illinois	4	–	4	7	–	6
Penn State	4	–	4	7	–	6
Michigan	3	–	5	7	–	6
Northwestern	3	–	5	7	–	6
Purdue	2	–	6	4	–	8
Minnesota	2	–	6	3	–	9
Indiana	1	–	7	5	–	7
No. 5 Ohio State† %	0	–	1	0	–	1
$ – BCS representative as conference champion; % – BCS at-large representative; + – Conference co-champions; † – Ohio State (12–1, 7–1) self-vacated all of their wins; Rankings from AP Poll

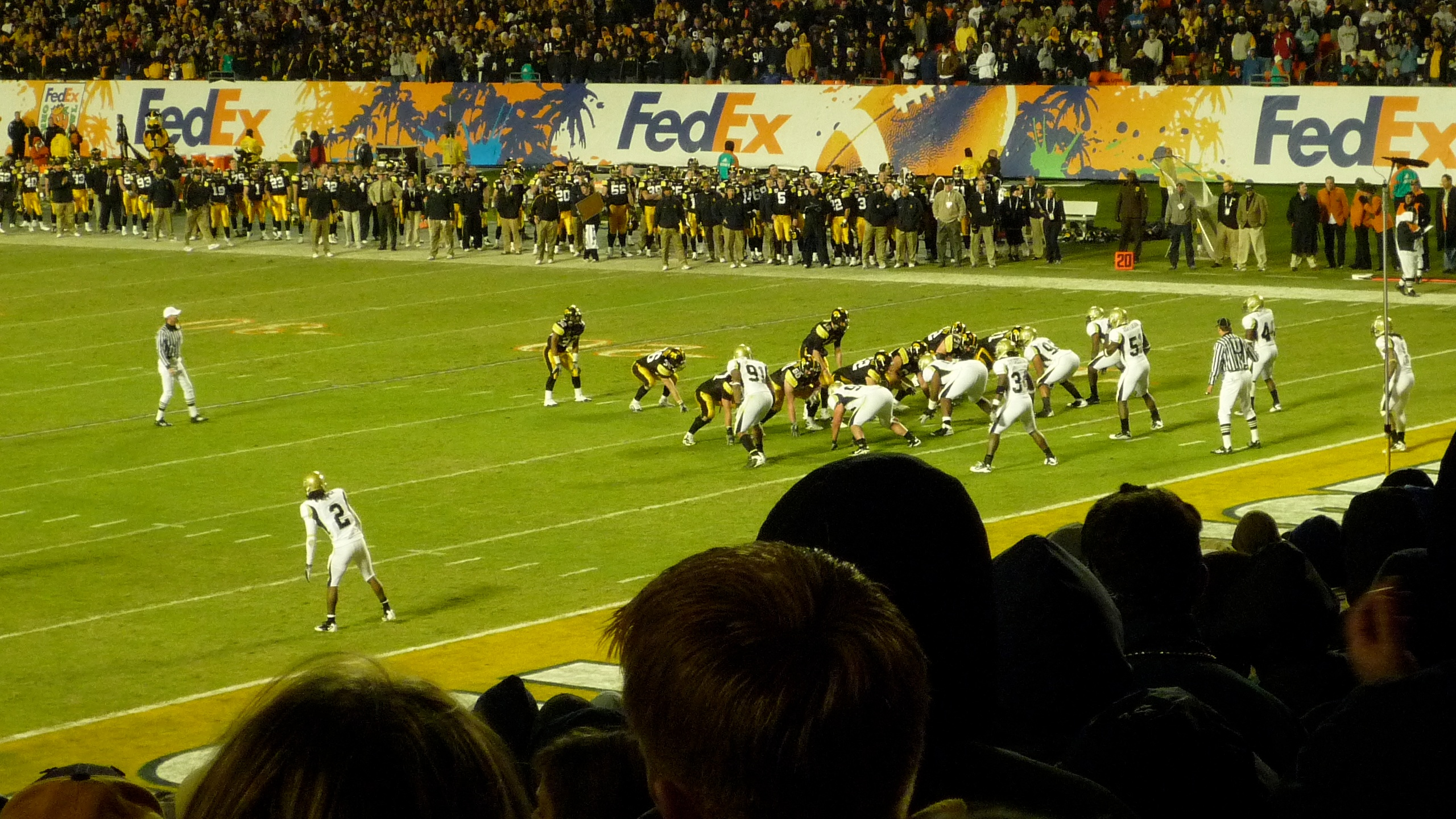
Iowa offense vs. the Georgia Tech defense, 2010 Orange Bowl

The 2010 Iowa Hawkeyes football team represented the University of Iowa in the 2010 NCAA Division I FBS football season. The Hawkeyes, led by 12th year head coach Kirk Ferentz, were members of the Big Ten Conference and played their home games at Kinnick Stadium in Iowa City, Iowa.

The Hawkeyes finished the regular season 7–5 (4–4 Big Ten) and earned a trip to the Insight Bowl, where they faced the Missouri Tigers. The Hawkeyes won the game 27–24 and finished the season 8–5.

== Preseason ==
Iowa came off of an 11–2 season in 2009, in which they finished with a victory over Georgia Tech in the 2010 Orange Bowl and a final ranking of No. 7 in both major polls. Many players from the previous season returned, including Ricky Stanzi, Derrell Johnson-Koulianos, Marvin McNutt, Adrian Clayborn and Tyler Sash, which led to high expectations among Hawkeye fans. Iowa entered the season ranked 9th in the AP Poll and 10th in the Coaches' Poll.

== Schedule ==
Date	Time	Opponent	Rank	Site	TV	Result	Attendance
September 4	11:05 am	Eastern Illinois*	No. 9	Kinnick Stadium; Iowa City, IA	BTN	W 37–7	70,585
September 11	2:30 pm	Iowa State*	No. 9	Kinnick Stadium; Iowa City, IA (Cy-Hawk Trophy)	ABC/ESPN2	W 35–7	70,585
September 18	9:30 pm	at No. 24 Arizona*	No. 9	Arizona Stadium; Tucson, AZ	ESPN	L 27–34	57,864
September 25	11:00 am	Ball State*	No. 18	Kinnick Stadium; Iowa City, IA	BTN	W 45–0	70,585
October 2	7:00 pm	No. 22 Penn State^{†}	No. 17	Kinnick Stadium; Iowa City, IA	ESPN	W 24–3	70,585
October 16	2:30 pm	at Michigan	No. 15	Michigan Stadium; Ann Arbor, MI	ABC/ESPN	W 38–28	112,784
October 23	2:30 pm	No. 10 Wisconsin	No. 13	Kinnick Stadium; Iowa City, IA (Heartland Trophy)	ABC/ESPN	L 30–31	70,585
October 30	2:30 pm	No. 5 Michigan State	No. 18	Kinnick Stadium; Iowa City, IA	ABC/ESPN	W 37–6	70,585
November 6	11:00 am	at Indiana	No. 15	Memorial Stadium; Bloomington, IN	BTN	W 18–13	42,991
November 13	11:00 am	at Northwestern	No. 13	Ryan Field; Evanston, IL	ESPN	L 17–21	47,130
November 20	2:30 pm	No. 8 Ohio State	No. 21	Kinnick Stadium; Iowa City, IA	ABC	L 17–20	70,585
November 27	2:30 pm	at Minnesota	No. 24	TCF Bank Stadium; Minneapolis, MN (Floyd of Rosedale)	BTN	L 24–27	50,805
December 28	10:00 pm	vs. No. 14 Missouri*		Sun Devil Stadium; Tempe, AZ (Insight Bowl)	ESPN	W 27–24	53,453
*Non-conference game; ^{†}Homecoming; Rankings from AP Poll released prior to the game; All times are in Central time

== Rankings ==
Ranking movements Legend: ██ Increase in ranking ██ Decrease in ranking — = Not ranked RV = Received votes
	Week															
Poll	Pre	1	2	3	4	5	6	7	8	9	10	11	12	13	14	Final
AP	9	9	9	18	17	15	15	15	13	18	15	21	24	—	RV	RV
Coaches	10	9	10	18	18	15	14	12	12	19	16	21	24	RV	RV	RV
Harris	Not released						15	12	17	14	12	19	24	RV	RV	Not released
BCS	Not released							15	18	16	13	20	24	—	—	Not released

== Roster ==
2010 Iowa Hawkeyes football team roster
Players
Coaches
Offense

Pos.	#	Name	Class
QB	12	Ricky Stanzi	Sr
QB	16	James Vandenberg	So
QB	17	A. J. Derby	Fr
RB	27	Jewel Hampton (injured)	Jr
RB	36	Brett Morse	Sr
RB	25	Paki O'Meara	Sr
RB	32	Adam Robinson	So
RB	34	Marcus Coker	Fr
RB	38	Brad Rogers	Fr
RB	3	Brandon Wegher	So
WR	26	Paul Chaney Jr.	Sr
WR	23	Jordan Cotton	Fr
WR	6	Keenan Davis	So
WR	15	Derrell Johnson-Koulianos	Sr
WR	7	Marvin McNutt	Jr
WR	22	Colin Sandeman	Sr
TE	85	Zach Derby	So
TE	86	C.J. Fiedorowicz	Fr
TE	39	Brad Herman	Jr
TE	82	Allen Reisner	Sr
OL	78	Andrew Donnal	Fr
OL	53	James Ferentz	So
OL	73	Adam Gettis	Jr
OL	77	Riley Reiff	So
OL	68	Brandon Scherff	Fr
OL	63	Julian Vandervelde	Sr
OL	56	Markus Zusevics	Jr

Defense

Pos.	#	Name	Class
DL	79	Dominic Alvis	So
DL	46	Christian Ballard	Sr
DL	91	Broderick Binns	Jr
DL	94	Adrian Clayborn	Sr
DL	93	Mike Daniels	Jr
DL	71	Carl Davis	Fr
DL	95	Karl Klug	Sr
DL	90	Louis Trinca-Pasat	Fr
LB	31	Anthony Hitchens	Fr
LB	42	Jeremiha Hunter	Sr
LB	20	Christian Kirksey	Fr
LB	48	Troy Johnson	Sr
LB	44	James Morris	Fr
LB	45	Tyler Nielsen	Jr
LB	33	Jeff Tarpinian	Sr
DB	4	Jordan Bernstine	Jr
DB	2	Greg Castillo	So
DB	13	Tom Donatell	So
DB	30	Brett Greenwood	Sr
DB	18	Micah Hyde	So
DB	10	William Lowe	Jr
DB	28	Shaun Prater	Jr
DB	9	Tyler Sash	Jr

Special teams

Pos.	#	Name	Class
K	96	Mike Meyer	Fr
K	8	Trent Mossbrucker	Jr
K	1	Daniel Murray	Sr
P	5	Ryan Donahue	Sr
LS	69	Charlie Knipper	So
LS	61	Casey Kreiter	Fr
LS	65	Andrew Schulze	Sr

Head coach

- Kirk Ferentz

Coordinators/assistant coaches

- Ken O'Keefe – Offensive Coordinator and Quarterbacks
- Norm Parker – Defensive Coordinator
- Phil Parker – Defensive Backs
- LeVar Woods – Assistant
- Chris Doyle – Strength and Conditioning

Legend

- (C) Team captain
- (S) Suspended
- (I) Ineligible
- Injured
- Redshirt

Roster

== Game summaries ==
=== Eastern Illinois ===
Team	1	2	3	4	Total
Eastern Illinois	0	7	0	0	7
• #9/10 Iowa	21	7	2	7	37

- Date: September 4
- Location: Kinnick Stadium, Iowa City, Iowa
- Game start: 11:01 a.m. CDT
- Game attendance: 70,585
- Game weather: 61 °F (16 °C) (Sunny)
- Referee: Todd Ransom
- TV announcers (BTN): Tom Hart (Play-by-play), Anthony Herron (Color) & Lisa Byington (Sideline)
- Source: Box score

Scoring summary
1	12:20	Iowa	Adam Robinson 2-yard run (Trent Mossbrucker kick)	Iowa 7–0
1	4:56	Iowa	Adam Robinson 4-yard run (Trent Mossbrucker kick)	Iowa 14–0
1	0:53	Iowa	Paki O'Meara 42-yard blocked punt return (Trent Mossbrucker kick)	Iowa 21–0
2	2:52	EIU	Von Wise 11-yard pass from Brandon Large (Kevin Cook kick)	Iowa 21–7
2	8:39	Iowa	Adam Robinson 6-yard run (Trent Mossbrucker kick)	Iowa 28–7
3	8:44	Iowa	Ball through end zone, Safety	Iowa 30–7
4	8:27	Iowa	Brett Morse 1-yard pass from Ricky Stanzi (Trent Mossbrucker kick)	Iowa 37–7

Running back Adam Robinson carried the ball 24 times for 109 yards and 3 touchdowns, while Stanzi, the quarterback, threw for 229 yards and one touchdown as the Hawkeyes won with relative ease. Also scoring for Iowa was Paki O'Meara, who blocked an Eastern Illinois punt and returned it 42 yards. Trailing 21–0, Eastern Illinois' only points came on a second-quarter drive that included a fake punt and an 11-yard touchdown pass from Brandon Large to Von Wise. On the next possession, Stanzi took a tumble onto the turf and limped off to the sidelines, creating concern among the sellout crowd, but Robinson and backup James Vandenberg would lead them down the field for another score. Stanzi would later return.

=== Iowa State ===
Team	1	2	3	4	Total
Iowa State	0	0	0	7	7
• #9/9 Iowa	7	21	7	0	35

- Date: September 11
- Location: Kinnick Stadium, Iowa City, IA
- Game start: 2:36 p.m. CDT
- Game attendance: 70,585
- Game weather: 74 °F (23 °C) (Partly Cloudy)
- Referee: Greg Burks
- TV announcers (ABC/ESPN2): Ron Franklin (Play-by-play) & Ed Cunningham (Color)
- Source: Box score

Scoring summary
1	8:06	Iowa	Marvin McNutt 9-yard pass from Ricky Stanzi (Trent Mossbrucker kick)	Iowa 7–0
2	13:31	Iowa	Jewel Hampton 2-yard run (Trent Mossbrucker kick)	Iowa 14–0
2	10:02	Iowa	Allen Reisner 2-yard pass from Ricky Stanzi (Trent Mossbrucker kick)	Iowa 21–0
2	2:52	Iowa	Ricky Stanzi 1-yard run (Trent Mossbrucker kick)	Iowa 28–0
3	6:45	Iowa	Adam Robinson 39-yard run (Trent Mossbrucker kick)	Iowa 35–0
4	1:51	ISU	Darius Darks 8-yard pass from Austen Arnaud (Grant Mahoney kick)	Iowa 35–7

From the get-go, the Hawkeyes were in control of the game, receiving the opening kickoff and scoring seven minutes later on a 9-yard Marvin McNutt pass from Ricky Stanzi. Iowa State would see the ball for just 1:26 in the first quarter, going three and out on their only drive, giving it back to Iowa, who would increase its lead to 14–0 on the next possession, which lasted into the early second quarter. In all, Iowa possessed the ball for over 35 minutes, passing for 275 yards and rushing for another 204 along the way.

The Cyclones, meanwhile, endured a replica of the poor performance they put forward against Iowa in 2009, being limited to 179 yards in three quarters. Quarterback Austen Arnaud, who threw for four interceptions in that game, was picked off three more times this year. However, after going 17 quarters without scoring an offensive touchdown against Iowa, ISU finally found the end zone with 1:46 remaining in the game, on an 8-yard touchdown pass from Arnaud to Darius Darks.

=== At No. 24 Arizona ===
Team	1	2	3	4	Total
#9/9 Iowa	0	7	7	13	27
• #24/18 Arizona	14	13	0	7	34

- Date: September 18
- Location: Arizona Stadium
  Tucson, AZ
- Game start: 9:41 p.m. CDT
- Elapsed time: 3:34
- Game attendance: 57,864
- Game weather: 97 °F (36 °C), Clear, Wind NW 8 mph (13 km/h)
- Referee: Larry Farina
- TV announcers (ESPN): Mark Jones (Play-by-play) & Bob Davie (Color)
- Source: Box Score

Scoring summary
1	12:45	Ariz	David Douglas 5-Yd Pass From Nick Foles (Alex Zendejas Kick)	Ariz 7–0
1	10:10	Ariz	Trevin Wade 85-Yd Interception Return (Alex Zendejas Kick)	Ariz 14–0
2	14:50	Iowa	Jewel Hampton 4-Yd Pass From Ricky Stanzi (Trent Mossbrucker Kick)	Ariz 14–7
2	14:36	Ariz	Travis Cobb 100-Yd Kickoff Return (Alex Zendejas Kick)	Ariz 21–7
2	5:42	Ariz	Alex Zendejas 22-Yd FG	Ariz 24–7
2	0:16	Ariz	Alex Zendejas 47-Yd FG	Ariz 27–7
3	7:15	Iowa	Derrell Johnson-Koulianos 37-Yd Pass From Ricky Stanzi (Trent Mossbrucker Kick)	Ariz 27–14
4	8:59	Iowa	Marvin McNutt 18-Yd Pass From Ricky Stanzi (Trent Mossbrucker Kick)	Ariz 27–21
4	8:12	Iowa	Broderick Binns 20-Yd Interception Return (Pat Blocked)	Tied 27–27
4	3:57	Ariz	William Wright 4 Yd Pass From Nick Foles (Alex Zendejas Kick)	Ariz 34–27

After allowing long interception and kickoff returns for touchdowns, the #9 Hawkeyes found themselves down by 20 at halftime. Despite the sizable deficit on the road, Iowa mounted a comeback with a strong second half. Ricky Stanzi tossed a third quarter touchdown to Derrell Johnson-Koulianos, and another in the fourth to Marvin McNutt to bring the Hawkeyes to within six at 27–21. Moments later, defensive end Broderick Binns snatched a Nick Foles pass out of the air and returned it 20 yards for the tying touchdown. The extra point was blocked, denying the Hawkeyes their first lead of the game. On the ensuing possession, Foles led the Wildcats on a 9-play, 72-yard drive capped with a 4-yard touchdown pass on third and goal. Stanzi was sacked three times on Iowa's next possession, effectively ending the game. Arizona would go on to start 7–1 before dropping their final five games of the season to finish 7–6.

=== Ball State ===
Team	1	2	3	4	Total
Ball State	0	0	0	0	0
• #18/18 Iowa	7	14	14	10	45

- Date: September 25
- Location: Kinnick Stadium, Iowa City, IA
- Game start: 11:00 a.m. CDT
- Game attendance: 70,585
- Game weather: <!-−74 °F (−59 °C) (Partly Cloudy)-->
- Source: Box score

Scoring summary
1	6:34	Iowa	Adam Robinson 1-yard run (Michael Meyer kick)	Iowa 7–0
2	5:40	Iowa	Keenan Davis 8-yard pass from Ricky Stanzi (Michael Meyer kick)	Iowa 14–0
2	1:54	Iowa	Derrell Johnson-Koulianos 22-yard pass from Ricky Stanzi (Michael Meyer kick)	Iowa 21–0
3	10:25	Iowa	Adam Robinson 1-yard run (Michael Meyer kick)	Iowa 28–0
3	3:26	Iowa	Derrell Johnson-Koulianos 45-yard pass from Ricky Stanzi (Michael Meyer kick)	Iowa 35–0
4	10:28	Iowa	Colin Sandeman 6-yard pass from James Vandenberg (Michael Meyer kick)	Iowa 42–0
4	5:09	Iowa	Michael Meyer 25-yard field goal	Iowa 45–0

The Hawkeyes came off the tough loss at Arizona by dominating Ball State, outgaining the Cardinals 562–112 in total yards. Ricky Stanzi threw for 288 yards and 3 touchdowns, with two of those scores being hauled in by Derrell Johnson-Koulianos (4 total receptions for 87 yards). Adam Robinson had 115 yards rushing and 2 touchdowns.

=== No. 22 Penn State ===
Team	1	2	3	4	Total
#22/20 Penn State	0	3	0	0	3
• #17/18 Iowa	10	7	0	7	24

- Date: October 2
- Location: Kinnick Stadium, Iowa City, IA
- Game start: 7:05 p.m. CDT
- Game attendance: 70,585
- Television network: ESPN
- Source: ESPN

Scoring summary
1	9:21	Iowa	Michael Meyer 21-yard FG	Iowa 3–0
1	1:00	Iowa	Derrell Johnson-Koulianos 9-yard pass from Ricky Stanzi (Michael Meyer kick)	Iowa 10–0
2	1:41	Iowa	Ricky Stanzi 1-yard run (Michael Meyer kick)	Iowa 17–0
2	0:00	PSU	Collin Wagner 25-yard FG	Iowa 17–3
4	1:27	Iowa	Shaun Prater 33-yard interception return (Michael Meyer kick)	Iowa 24–3

Iowa opened up Big Ten play in dominating fashion, holding a ranked Penn State team to 54 yards rushing en route to its largest margin of victory over the Nittany Lions, 24–3. It was the Hawkeyes' eighth win in nine games against Penn State.

=== At Michigan ===
Team	1	2	3	4	Total
• #15/14 Iowa	7	14	7	10	38
NR/#24 Michigan	7	0	0	21	28

- Date: October 16
- Location: Michigan Stadium, Ann Arbor, MI
- Game start: 2:30 p.m. CDT
- Game attendance: 112,784
- Game weather: <!-−62 °F (−52 °C), Partly Cloudy, Wind WNW 10 mph-->
- Television network: ABC
- Source: Box score

Scoring summary
1	8:18	Mich	Vincent Smith 8-yard pass from Denard Robinson (Seth Broekhuizen kick)	Mich 7–0
1	1:29	Iowa	Derrell Johnson-Koulianos 14-yard pass from Ricky Stanzi (Michael Meyer kick)	Tied 7–7
2	13:22	Iowa	Derrell Johnson-Koulianos 31-yard pass from Ricky Stanzi (Michael Meyer kick)	Iowa 14–7
2	4:31	Iowa	Adam Robinson 4-yard run (Michael Meyer Kick)	Iowa 21–7
3	1:50	Iowa	Adam Robinson 11-yard run (Michael Meyer Kick)	Iowa 28–7
4	13:10	Mich	Stephen Hopkins 2-yard run (Seth Broekhuizen kick)	Iowa 28–14
4	11:37	Iowa	Derrell Johnson-Koulianos 19-yard pass from Ricky Stanzi (Michael Meyer kick)	Iowa 35–14
4	10:28	Mich	Junior Hemingway 45-yard pass from Tate Forcier (Seth Broekhuizen kick)	Iowa 35–21
4	6:55	Mich	Tate Forcier 3-yard run (Seth Broekhuizen kick)	Iowa 35–28
4	2:53	Iowa	Michael Meyer 30-yard field goal	Iowa 38–28

After twice holding a 21-point lead in Ann Arbor (28–7 end of 3rd quarter, 35–14 early in the 4th quarter), Iowa held on to win its Big Ten road opener, 38–28. Adam Robinson rushed for 143 yards and 2 touchdowns, and Derrell Johnson-Koulianos hauled in 3 touchdown receptions. After this win, the Hawkeyes had won 20 of 23 games dating back to the 2008 season.

=== No. 10 Wisconsin ===
Team	1	2	3	4	Total
• #10/11 Wisconsin	3	7	14	7	31
#13/12 Iowa	6	7	7	10	30

- Date: October 23
- Location: Kinnick Stadium, Iowa City, IA
- Game start: 2:30 p.m. CDT
- Elapsed time: 3:23
- Game attendance: 70,585
- Game weather: Partly Cloudy, 67°, Wind S 14 mph (23 km/h)
- Referee: Bill LeMonnier
- TV announcers (ABC/ESPN): Sean McDonough (Play-by-play), Matt Millen (Color) & Heather Cox (Sideline)
- Source: Box score

Scoring summary
1	6:51	WIS	Philip Welch 33-Yd FG	WIS 3–0
1	2:31	Iowa	Adam Robinson 1-Yd run (PAT blocked)	Iowa 6–3
2	12:11	WIS	Bradie Ewing 7-Yd Pass From Scott Tolzien (Philip Welch Kick)	WIS 10–6
2	0:16	Iowa	Allen Reisner 3 Yd Pass From Ricky Stanzi (Michael Meyer Kick)	Iowa 13–10
3	6:30	WIS	John Clay 2-Yd Run (Philip Welch Kick)	WIS 17–13
3	3:08	Iowa	Derrell Johnson-Koulianos 45-Yd Pass From Ricky Stanzi (Michael Meyer Kick)	Iowa 20–17
3	1:01	WIS	John Clay 2-Yd Run (Philip Welch Kick)	WIS 24–20
4	10:16	Iowa	Marvin McNutt 6-Yd Pass from Ricky Stanzi (Michael Meyer Kick)	Iowa 27–24
4	8:35	Iowa	Michael Meyer 40-Yd FG	Iowa 30–24
4	1:06	WIS	Montee Ball 8-Yd Run (Philip Welch Kick)	WIS 31–30

The two teams traded scores until the Hawkeyes kicked a field goal with 8:35 remaining to go up 30–24. Iowa forced the Badgers into a punting situation on their next possession, but were not prepared for a fake on 4th down and 4 from Wisconsin's own 26. Badger punter Brad Nortman ran for 17 yards on the play, and Wisconsin methodically marched down the field for the go-ahead score. The Hawkeyes also had an extra point blocked after their first touchdown, and the two special teams miscues proved costly. The victory catapulted Wisconsin toward a share of the Big Ten title and the Rose Bowl, as they won their final four regular season games by an average of 37.8 points.

=== No. 5 Michigan State ===
Team	1	2	3	4	Total
#5 Michigan State	0	0	0	6	6
• #18/19 Iowa	17	13	7	0	37

- Date: October 30
- Location: Kinnick Stadium, Iowa City, IA
- Game start: 2:30 p.m. CDT
- Elapsed time: 3:11
- Game attendance: 70,585
- Game weather: 62 °F (17 °C), Partly Cloudy, Wind WNW 10 mph (16 km/h)
- Referee: Dennis Lipski
- TV announcers (ABC/ESPN): Sean McDonough (Play-by-play), Matt Millen (Color) & Heather Cox (Sideline)
- Source: Box score

Scoring summary
1	8:48	Iowa	Colin Sandeman 3-Yd Pass From Ricky Stanzi (Michael Meyer Kick)	Iowa 7–0
1	2:44	Iowa	Michael Meyer 37-Yd FG	Iowa 10–0
1	0:10	Iowa	Micah Hyde 66 Yd Interception Return (Michael Meyer Kick)	Iowa 17–0
2	7:05	Iowa	Adam Robinson 32-Yd Pass From Ricky Stanzi (Pat Failed)	Iowa 23–0
2	1:01	Iowa	Adam Robinson 2-Yd Run (Michael Meyer Kick)	Iowa 30–0
3	7:35	Iowa	Marvin McNutt 22-Yd Pass From Ricky Stanzi (Michael Meyer Kick)	Iowa 37–0
4	14:56	MSU	B.J. Cunningham 6-Yd Pass From Kirk Cousins (Two-Point Pass Conversion Failed)	Iowa 37–6

The Hawkeyes dismantled previously unbeaten, fifth-ranked Michigan State. After leading 30–0 at halftime, Iowa opened up a 37–0 advantage before the Spartans scored their only points of the game in the fourth quarter. This effort was a showcase of what could have been in 2010 for Iowa.

=== At Indiana ===
Team	1	2	3	4	Total
• #15/16 Iowa	3	3	3	9	18
Indiana	3	3	7	0	13

- Date: November 6
- Location: Memorial Stadium
  Bloomington, IN
- Game start: 11:02 a.m. CST
- Elapsed time: 3:05
- Game attendance: 42,991
- Game weather: 39 °F (4 °C), Sunny, Wind N 4 mph (6.4 km/h)
- Referee: John O'Neill
- Source: Box Score

Scoring summary
1	10:21	Iowa	Michael Meyer 23-yard field goal	Iowa 3–0
1	7:00	Ind	Mitch Ewald 37-yard field goal	Tied 3–3
2	12:45	Iowa	Michael Meyer 27-yard field goal	Iowa 6–3
2	8:20	Ind	Mitch Ewald 28-yard field goal	Tied 6–6
3	5:33	Iowa	Michael Meyer 27-yard field goal	Iowa 9–6
3	0:42	Ind	Ben Chappell 1-yard run (Mitch Ewald kick)	Ind 13–9
4	8:33	Iowa	Michael Meyer 42-yard field goal	Ind 13–12
4	2:50	Iowa	Marvin McNutt 52-yard pass from Ricky Stanzi (pass failed)	Iowa 18–13

=== At Northwestern ===
Team	1	2	3	4	Total
#13/13 Iowa	0	3	14	0	17
• Northwestern	7	0	0	14	21

- Date: November 13
- Location: Ryan Field
  Evanston, IL
- Game start: 11:00 a.m. CST
- Elapsed time: 3:09
- Game attendance: 47,130
- Game weather: 56 °F (13 °C), Cloudy, light precipitation, Wind WSW 10 mph (16 km/h)
- Referee: Dan Capron
- TV announcers (ESPN): Dave Pasch (Play-by-play), Bob Griese & Chris Spielman (Color)
- Source: Box Score

Scoring summary
1	7:37	NW	Dan Persa 2-yd run (Stefan Demos Kick)	NW 7–0
2	0:24	Iowa	Mike Meyer 32-yard field goal	NW 7–3
3	9:59	Iowa	Marvin McNutt 5-Yd Pass From Ricky Stanzi (Mike Meyer Kick)	Iowa 10–7
3	6:01	Iowa	Derrell Johnson-Koulianos 70-Yd Pass From Ricky Stanzi (Mike Meyer Kick)	Iowa 17–7
4	6:21	NW	Jeremy Ebert 6-Yd Pass from Dan Persa (Stefan Demos Kick)	Iowa 17–14
4	1:22	NW	D. Fields 20-Yd Pass from Dan Persa (Stefan Demos Kick)	NW 21–17

After the Wildcats scored a touchdown midway through the first quarter, Iowa rattled off the next 17 points and led by 10 entering the 4th quarter. The Hawkeyes were threatening again when Stanzi was picked off near the end zone. That play changed momentum and Northwestern scored touchdowns after 85- and 91-yard drives. Wildcat quarterback Dan Persa ruptured his Achilles' tendon after throwing the winning touchdown. This marked the fifth win over Iowa in six tries for Northwestern, building off their stunning victory over the 9–0 #4-ranked Hawkeyes in Kinnick Stadium the prior year.

=== No. 8 Ohio State ===
Team	1	2	3	4	Total
• #9/7 Ohio State	0	3	7	10	20
#21/20 Iowa	7	0	3	7	17

- Date: November 20
- Location: Kinnick Stadium, Iowa City, IA
- Game start: 2:30 p.m. CST
- Game attendance: 70,585
- Game weather: <!-−62 °F (−52 °C), Partly Cloudy, Wind WNW 10 mph-->
- TV announcers (ABC): Sean McDonough (Play-by-play), Matt Millen (Color) & Quint Kessenich (Sideline)
- Source: Box score

Scoring summary
1	1:05	Iowa	Marvin McNutt 19-Yd Pass From Ricky Stanzi (Michael Meyer Kick)	Iowa 7–0
2	11:34	OSU	Devin Barclay 18-Yd FG	Iowa 7–3
3	8:36	OSU	Reid Fragel 5-Yd Pass From Terrelle Pryor (Devin Barclay Kick)	OSU 10–7
3	3:26	Iowa	Michael Meyer 31-Yd FG	Tied 10–10
4	11:53	Iowa	Marcus Coker 1 Yd Run (Michael Meyer Kick)	Iowa 17–10
4	7:38	OSU	Devin Barclay 48-Yd FG	Iowa 17–13
4	1:47	OSU	Dan Herron 1-Yd Run (Devin Barclay Kick)	OSU 20–17

With Iowa leading 17–13 late in the fourth quarter, Buckeye quarterback Terrelle Pryor scrambled for 14 yards on 4th and 10. Four plays later, Dan Herron scored from a yard out giving Ohio State the lead for good. The loss was the Hawkeyes' third in five weeks where Iowa gave up the game-winning score inside the final two minutes of the game.

In July 2011 Ohio State vacated all of their 2010 victories in response to the NCAA infractions committed by five players, which Coach Jim Tressel had covered up at the time. This included their victory against the Hawkeyes.

=== At Minnesota ===
Team	1	2	3	4	Total
#24/24 Iowa	0	17	0	7	24
• Minnesota	10	10	0	7	27

- Date: November 27
- Location: TCF Bank Stadium
  Minneapolis, MN
- Game start: 2:37 p.m. CDT
- Elapsed time: 3:00
- Game attendance: 50,805
- Game weather: 23 °F (−5 °C), Sunny, Wind WSW 8 mph (13 km/h)
- Referee: Todd Geerlings
- Source: Box Score

Scoring summary
1	10:15	Minn	Eric Ellestad 26-yard field goal	Minn 3–0
1	5:44	Minn	MarQueis Gray 14-yard run (Eric Ellestad kick)	Minn 10–0
2	14:53	Iowa	Derrell Johnson-Koulianos 7-yard pass From Ricky Stanzi (Michael Meyer kick)	Minn 10–7
2	12:16	Minn	DeLeon Eskridge 11-yard run (Eric Ellestad kick)	Minn 17–7
2	12:04	Iowa	Derrell Johnson-Koulianos 88-yard kickoff return	Minn 17–14
2	5:35	Minn	Eric Ellestad 35-yard field goal	Minn 20–14
2	0:50	Iowa	Michael Meyer 35-yard field goal	Minn 20–17
4	11:35	Iowa	Marvin McNutt 18-yard pass from Ricky Stanzi (Michael Meyer kick)	Iowa 24–20
4	4:31	Minn	Duane Bennett 6-yard run (Eric Ellestad kick)	Minn 27–24

In Iowa's first trip to TCF Bank Stadium, Minnesota – 2–9 entering the game – handed the Hawkeyes their third straight loss to end the regular season. The loss also dropped Iowa out of the Top 25 rankings for the first time since Week 3 of the 2009 season.

=== Vs. No. 14 Missouri (Insight Bowl) ===
Team	1	2	3	4	Total
#12 Missouri	3	7	14	0	24
• Iowa	7	10	3	7	27

- Date: December 28
- Location: Sun Devil Stadium, Tempe, AZ
- Game start: 8:01 p.m. CST
- Elapsed time: 3:09
- Game attendance: 53,453
- Game weather: 57 °F (14 °C)
- Referee: Tom McCabe
- TV announcers (ESPN): Sean McDonough (Play-by-play), Matt Millen (Color) & Heather Cox (Sideline)
- Source: Box Score

Scoring summary
1	10:32	Iowa	Marcus Coker 1-yard run (Michael Meyer kick)	Iowa 7–0
1	3:53	Miz	Grant Ressel 23-yard FG	Iowa 7–3
2	13:26	Iowa	Marcus Coker 62-yard run (Michael Meyer kick)	Iowa 14–3
2	7:28	Iowa	Michael Meyer 34-yard FG	Iowa 17–3
2	4:51	Miz	Henry Josey 10-yard run (Grant Ressel kick)	Iowa 17–10
3	7:03	Iowa	Michael Meyer 21-yard FG	Iowa 20–10
3	4:34	Miz	Blaine Gabbert 7-yard run (Grant Ressel kick)	Iowa 20–17
3	0:54	Miz	Michael Egnew 3-yard pass from Blaine Gabbert (Grant Ressel kick)	Miz 24–20
4	5:32	Iowa	Micah Hyde 72-yard interception return (Michael Meyer kick)	Iowa 27–24

Despite the disappointing season, Iowa mopped up Missouri, the third place Big 12 Conference team, 27–24 to end the season on a high note. Freshman Marcus Coker ran for an Iowa bowl game record 219 yards and scored two touchdowns. Micah Hyde’s 72-yard interception return in the fourth quarter was the go-ahead score.

It was the first meeting between the schools in 100 years.

== All-Conference honors ==
Coaches
Position	Player
First Team Offense
WR	Derrell Johnson-Koulianos
First Team Defense
DL	Adrian Clayborn
DB	Shaun Prater
DB	Tyler Sash
Second Team Offense
WR	Marvin McNutt
OL	Julian Vandervelde
OL	Riley Reiff
TE	Allen Reisner
Second Team Defense
DL	Karl Klug
LB	Jeremiha Hunter
DB	Brett Greenwood
Honorable Mention
RB	Adam Robinson
DL	Christian Ballard
DL	Mike Daniels
P	Ryan Donahue

Media
Position	Player
First Team Defense
DL	Adrian Clayborn
DB	Shaun Prater
DB	Tyler Sash
Second Team Offense
OL	Julian Vandervelde
OL	Riley Reiff
Second Team Defense
DL	Karl Klug
Honorable Mention
RB	Adam Robinson
WR	Derrell Johnson-Koulianos
WR	Marvin McNutt
TE	Allen Reisner
DL	Christian Ballard
DL	Mike Daniels
LB	Jeremiha Hunter
DB	Brett Greenwood
DB	Micah Hyde
P	Ryan Donahue

== All-America honors ==
- Adrian Clayborn: Consensus First-Team All-American

== Players in the 2011 NFL draft ==
Player	Position	Round	Pick	NFL club	Ref
Adrian Clayborn	Defensive End	1	20	Tampa Bay Buccaneers	
Christian Ballard	Defensive Tackle	4	106	Minnesota Vikings	
Ricky Stanzi	Quarterback	5	135	Kansas City Chiefs	
Karl Klug	Defensive Tackle	5	142	Tennessee Titans	
Julian Vandervelde	Offensive Guard	5	161	Philadelphia Eagles	
Tyler Sash	Safety	6	198	New York Giants	
