= Derrell Johnson-Koulianos =

American gridiron football player (born 1987)

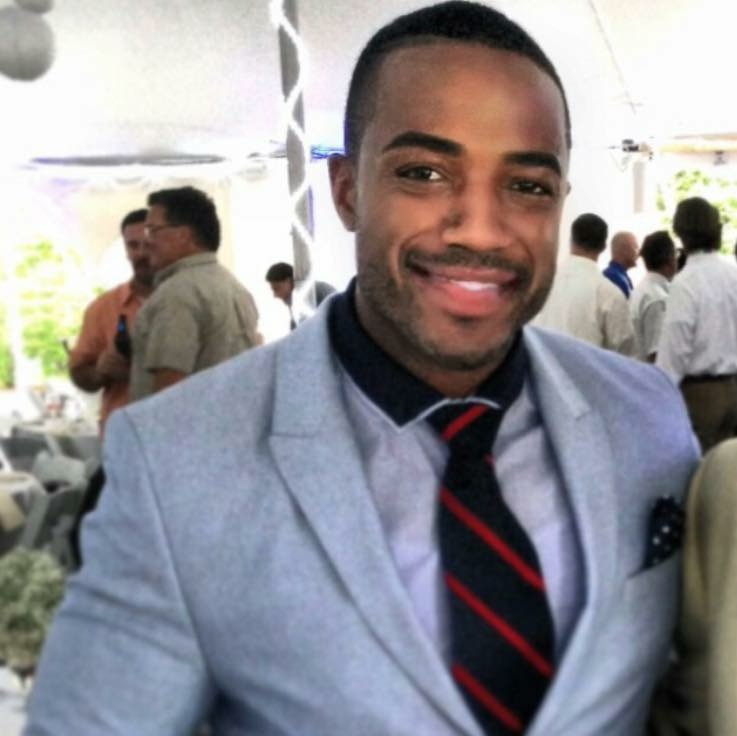

Personal information
- Born: February 24, 1987 (age 39)
- Listed height: 6 ft 1 in (1.85 m)
- Listed weight: 210 lb (95 kg)

Career information
- High school: Cardinal Mooney (Youngstown, Ohio)

Career history

Playing
- Montreal Alouettes (2011–2012)*; Iowa Barnstormers (2012)*
- * Offseason or practice squad member only

Coaching
- Valley Forge Military Academy and College (2014) Offensive coordinator & quarterbacks coach; King's (2015) Running backs coach; Imhotep Institute Charter High School (2016–2017) Tight ends coach; La Salle College High School (2018–2019) Wide receivers coach; Bloomsburg (2020–2021) Quarterback & wide receivers coach; Thiel (2022–2023) Offensive coordinator & quarterbacks coach

Awards and highlights
- First-team All-Big Ten (2010); Second-team All-Big Ten (2009)
- Stats at ArenaFan.com

Derrell Johnson-Koulianos (born February 24, 1987), sometimes nicknamed DJK, is an American football player and was a wide receiver for the Iowa Hawkeyes during the 2007-2010 seasons. During the 2007 season, Johnson-Koulianos caught 38 passes for 482 yards and two touchdowns. In 2008, he caught 44 passes for 639 yards and 3 touchdowns. In 2009, his productivity once again increased as he caught 45 passes for 750 yards and 2 touchdowns.

== Early life ==
While at Cardinal Mooney High School, Johnson-Koulianos received Ohio first-team all-state honors as a junior and a senior. On June 17, 2006, he was named Most Valuable Player for the Ohio team at the Big 33 Football Classic. Running for 138 yards and throwing for 118, Johnson-Koulianos had a part in three Ohio touchdowns.

== College career ==
Before the season began, Johnson-Koulianos appeared on a few college football award watch lists. He was one of the nation's 48 top collegiate players named to the inaugural Paul Hornung Award, awarded to college football's most versatile athlete, as well as selected for the Biletnikoff Award watch list, awarded to college football's top receiver.

In the season opener against Eastern Illinois, Johnson-Koulianos caught just 1 pass for 4 yards. The next week, against Iowa State, he grabbed 5 receptions for 65 yards. In the Hawkeyes' 3rd game of the year, a 34-27 loss to Arizona, Johnson-Koulianos hauled in 7 receptions for 114 yards and a touchdown, which sparked an Iowa run of 20 unanswered points. Johnson-Koulianos followed his efforts against the Wildcats by hauling in 4 catches for 87 yards and 2 touchdowns in a 45-0 rout of Ball State. The next week against Penn State, he made 4 catches for 64 yards and the only receiving touchdown of the game for the Hawkeyes. In his next game (against the Michigan Wolverines in Ann Arbor), Johnson-Koulianos would not disappoint, grabbing 4 receptions for 70 yards; three of them were touchdowns. In a 31-30 loss to the 2010 Wisconsin Badgers, Johnson-Koulianos caught 5 passes for 93 yards and a TD. He was suspended by the University of Iowa after being arrested for drug related issues. He did not appear in the bowl game due to his suspension.

=== Collegiate statistics ===
Season	Team	GP	Receiving			
Season	Team	GP	Rec	Yds	Avg	TD
2007	Iowa	12	38	482	11.9	2
2008	Iowa	13	44	639	14.5	3
2009	Iowa	12	45	750	16.7	2
2010	Iowa	12	46	745	16.2	10
Total		49	173	2,616	15.1	17

== Professional career ==
Derrell Johnson-Koulianos went undrafted in the NFL, but was signed by the Montreal Alouettes of the Canadian Football League on October 19, 2011.

In January 2012, Johnson-Koulianos signed with the Iowa Barnstormers of the Arena Football League. He was released in late February, 2012.

Johnson-Koulianos re-signed with the Montreal Alouettes on June 5 and was released on June 18.
