= 2010 All-Big Ten Conference football team =

American college football all-star team

The 2010 All-Big Ten Conference football team consists of American football players chosen as All-Big Ten Conference players for the 2010 Big Ten Conference football season. The conference recognizes two official All-Big Ten selectors: (1) the Big Ten conference coaches selected separate offensive and defensive units and named first- and second-team players (the "Coaches" team); and (2) a panel of sports writers and broadcasters covering the Big Ten also selected offensive and defensive units and named first- and second-team players (the "Media" team).

== Offensive selections ==
=== Quarterbacks ===
- Dan Persa, Northwestern (Coaches-1; Media-2)
- Denard Robinson, Michigan (Media-1)
- Scott Tolzien, Wisconsin (Coaches-2)

=== Running backs ===
- Mikel Leshoure, Illinois (Coaches-1; Media-1)
- Dan Herron, Ohio State (Coaches-1)
- Edwin Baker, Michigan State (Media-1)
- Evan Royster, Penn State (Coaches-2)
- John Clay, Wisconsin (Coaches-2; Media-2)
- James White, Wisconsin (Media-2)

=== Receivers ===
- Dane Sanzenbacher, Ohio State (Coaches-1; Media-1)
- Tandon Doss, Indiana (Coaches-1; Media-2)
- Derrell Johnson-Koulianos, Iowa (Coaches-1)
- Jeremy Ebert, Northwestern (Media-1)
- Marvin McNutt, Iowa (Coaches-2)
- Roy Roundtree, Michigan (Media-2)

=== Centers ===
- David Molk, Michigan (Coaches-1; Media-2)
- Mike Brewster, Ohio State (Coaches-2; Media-1)

=== Guards ===
- John Moffitt, Wisconsin (Coaches-1; Media-1)
- Stefen Wisniewski, Penn State (Coaches-1; Media-2)
- Justin Boren, Michigan (Coaches-2; Media-1)
- Julian Vandervelde, Iowa (Coaches-2; Media-2)

=== Tackles ===
- Mike Adams, Ohio State (Coaches-1; Media-1)
- Gabe Carimi, Wisconsin (Coaches-1; Media-1)
- Riley Reiff, Iowa (Coaches-2; Media-2)
- D. J. Young, Michigan State (Coaches-2)
- Jeff Allen, Illinois (Media-2)

=== Tight ends ===
- Lance Kendricks, Wisconsin (Coaches-1; Media-1)
- Allen Reisner, Iowa (Coaches-2)
- Charlie Gantt, Michigan State (Media-2)

== Defensive selections ==
=== Defensive linemen ===
- Adrian Clayborn, Iowa (Coaches-1; Media-1)
- Cameron Heyward, Ohio State (Coaches-1; Media-1)
- Ryan Kerrigan, Purdue (Coaches-1; Media-1)
- J. J. Watt, Wisconsin (Coaches-1; Media-1)
- Corey Liuget, Illinois (Coaches-2; Media-2)
- Karl Klug, Iowa (Coaches-2; Media-2)
- Mike Martin, Michigan (Coaches-2)
- Ollie Ogbu, Penn State (Coaches-2)
- Vince Browne, Northwestern (Media-2)
- Kawann Short, Purdue (Media-2)

=== Linebackers ===
- Greg Jones, Michigan State (Coaches-1; Media-1)
- Brian Rolle, Ohio State (Coaches-1; Media-1)
- Ross Homan, Ohio State (Coaches-1; Media-2)
- Martez Wilson, Illinois (Coaches-2; Media-1)
- Eric Gordon, Michigan State (Coaches-2; Media-2)
- Jeremiha Hunter, Iowa (Coaches-2)
- Jonas Mouton, Michigan (Media-2)

=== Defensive backs ===
- Chimdi Chekwa, Ohio State (Coaches-1; Media-1)
- Shaun Prater, Iowa (Coaches-1; Media-1)
- Tyler Sash, Iowa (Coaches-1; Media-1)
- Jermale Hines, Ohio State (Coaches-1; Media-2)
- Antonio Fenelus, Wisconsin (Media-1)
- Brett Greenwood, Iowa (Coaches-2)
- Johnny Adams, Michigan State (Coaches-2)
- Trenton Robinson, Michigan State (Coaches-2)
- Chris L. Rucker, Michigan State (Coaches-2)
- Aaron Henry, Wisconsin (Coaches-2)
- Marcus Hyde, Michigan State (Media-2)
- Brian Peters, Northwestern (Media-2)
- Ricardo Allen, Purdue (Media-2)

== Special teams ==
=== Kickers ===
- Dan Conroy, Michigan State (Coaches-1; Media-1)
- Derek Dimke, Illinois (Coaches-2)
- Devin Barclay, Ohio State (Media-2)

=== Punter ===
- Anthony Santella, Illinois (Coaches-1; Media-2)
- Aaron Bates, Michigan State (Coaches-2; Media-1)

== Key ==
Bold = Consensus first-team selection by both the coaches and media

Coaches = Selected by the Big Ten Conference coaches

Media = Selected by the conference media

== See also ==
- 2010 College Football All-America Team
