= Riley Reiff =

American football player (born 1988)

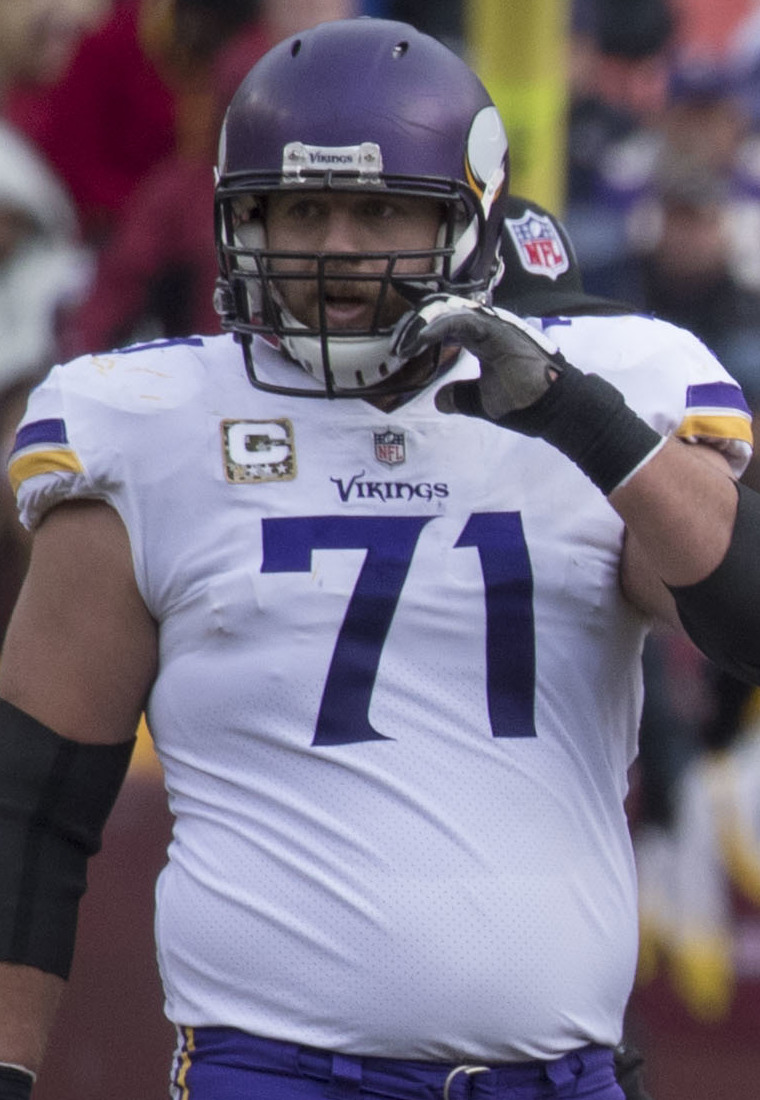
- Reiff with the Minnesota Vikings in 2017

No. 71, 78, 74
- Position: Offensive tackle

Personal information
- Born: December 1, 1988 (age 37); Parkston, South Dakota, U.S.
- Listed height: 6 ft 6 in (1.98 m)
- Listed weight: 310 lb (141 kg)

Career information
- High school: Parkston
- College: Iowa (2008–2011)
- NFL draft: 2012: 1st round, 23rd overall pick

Career history
- Detroit Lions (2012–2016); Minnesota Vikings (2017–2020); Cincinnati Bengals (2021); Chicago Bears (2022); New England Patriots (2023)

Awards and highlights
- All-American (2011); First-team All-Big Ten (2011); Second-team All-Big Ten (2010)

Career NFL statistics
- Games played: 164
- Games started: 149
- Stats at Pro Football Reference

Riley Reiff (born December 1, 1988) is an American former professional football player who was an offensive tackle in the National Football League (NFL). He played college football for the Iowa Hawkeyes and was selected by the Detroit Lions 23rd overall in the first round of the 2012 NFL draft. He previously played for the Lions from 2012 to 2016 and the Minnesota Vikings from 2017 to 2020.

== Early life ==
Born in Parkston, South Dakota to Jo and Tom Reiff, Riley attended Parkston High School, where he was a two-time South Dakota Elite 45 team selection under head coach Jon Mitchell. Reiff was a two-way player for the Trojans, receiving first-team All-State honors at defensive end as a sophomore and junior, as well as first-team All-State honors at tight end as a senior. As a senior in 2007–08, Reiff was named South Dakota Gatorade Player of the Year. During his high school career, Reiff recorded 261 total tackles, 23 sacks and eight interceptions on defense, and also caught 27 passes for 321 yards and nine touchdowns on offense.

In addition to football, Reiff also lettered in golf, track and was a three-time wrestling champion with a career record of 121–1, claiming three state titles. Reiff also excelled in the throwing events for the Parkston track and field team, owning personal-bests throws of 54 ft 5 in (16.59 m) in the shot put and 147 ft 8 in (45.01 m) in the discus throw.

Reiff was listed as a three-star defensive end prospect by Rivals.com and was ranked 28th nationally among senior strongside defensive ends. When it came to recruiting, one of Reiff's most persistent suitors was Iowa assistant coach Reese Morgan, who also lured former Vikings linebacker Chad Greenway to Iowa City back in 2001. Reiff initially committed to the Hawkeyes in April 2007 while still a junior at Parkston. He later had second thoughts and switched his verbal commitment to Nebraska, indicating that he "pulled the trigger a little too early" with Iowa, but when the Cornhuskers started sinking under the direction of Bill Callahan, Reiff found his way back to the Hawkeyes.

== College career ==
After redshirting his initial year at Iowa, Reiff started 11 of 13 games on the Hawkeyes' offensive line—three at left tackle, seven at left guard and final game at right tackle. He was named third team Freshman All-America by College Football News. In his sophomore year, Reiff replaced Bryan Bulaga at left tackle, starting all 13 games of the season. He was named second team All-Big Ten by league coaches and media.

A preseason All-American, Reiff started all 13 games at left tackle in his junior season as well. He was named All-Big Ten by coaches and media, as well as All-American by Pro Football Weekly, which evaluates players on NFL prospects and draft value rather just college production. On January 4, 2012, only a few days after Iowa's loss in the 2011 Insight Bowl, Reiff announced his decision to forgo his final year of eligibility at Iowa, entering the 2012 NFL draft.

== Professional career ==
=== Pre-draft ===
Already prior to his junior season, Reiff has been projected as a potential first round NFL Draft. In October 2011, Sports Illustrated's Tony Pauline ranked him as the No. 14 prospect on his midseason draft board. Prior to the NFL Combine in February 2012, Reiff was still perceived as a top-15 pick. At the combine, Reiff displayed decent athleticism but disappointed with his measureables; his 33 1/4 in (84.5 cm) arms were deemed short for an NFL left tackle. Reiff dropped out of the first round in some post-combine mock drafts. However, Mike Mayock still ranked him the No. 2 offensive tackle, behind Matt Kalil, after the combine, just as he did prior to the combine.

External videos
- Reiff's NFL Combine workout
- Reiff gets drafted by Detroit

Pre-draft measurables
Height	Weight	Arm length	Hand span	Wingspan	40-yard dash	10-yard split	20-yard split	20-yard shuttle	Three-cone drill	Vertical jump	Broad jump	Bench press
6 ft 5 3/4 in (1.97 m)	313 lb (142 kg)	33 1/4 in (0.84 m)	10 1/8 in (0.26 m)	6 ft 8 in (2.03 m)	5.23 s	1.82 s	3.02 s	4.75 s	7.87 s	29.5 in (0.75 m)	8 ft 2 in (2.49 m)	26 reps
All values from NFL Combine, except vertical leap and bench press from Pro Day

=== Detroit Lions ===
==== 2012 season ====
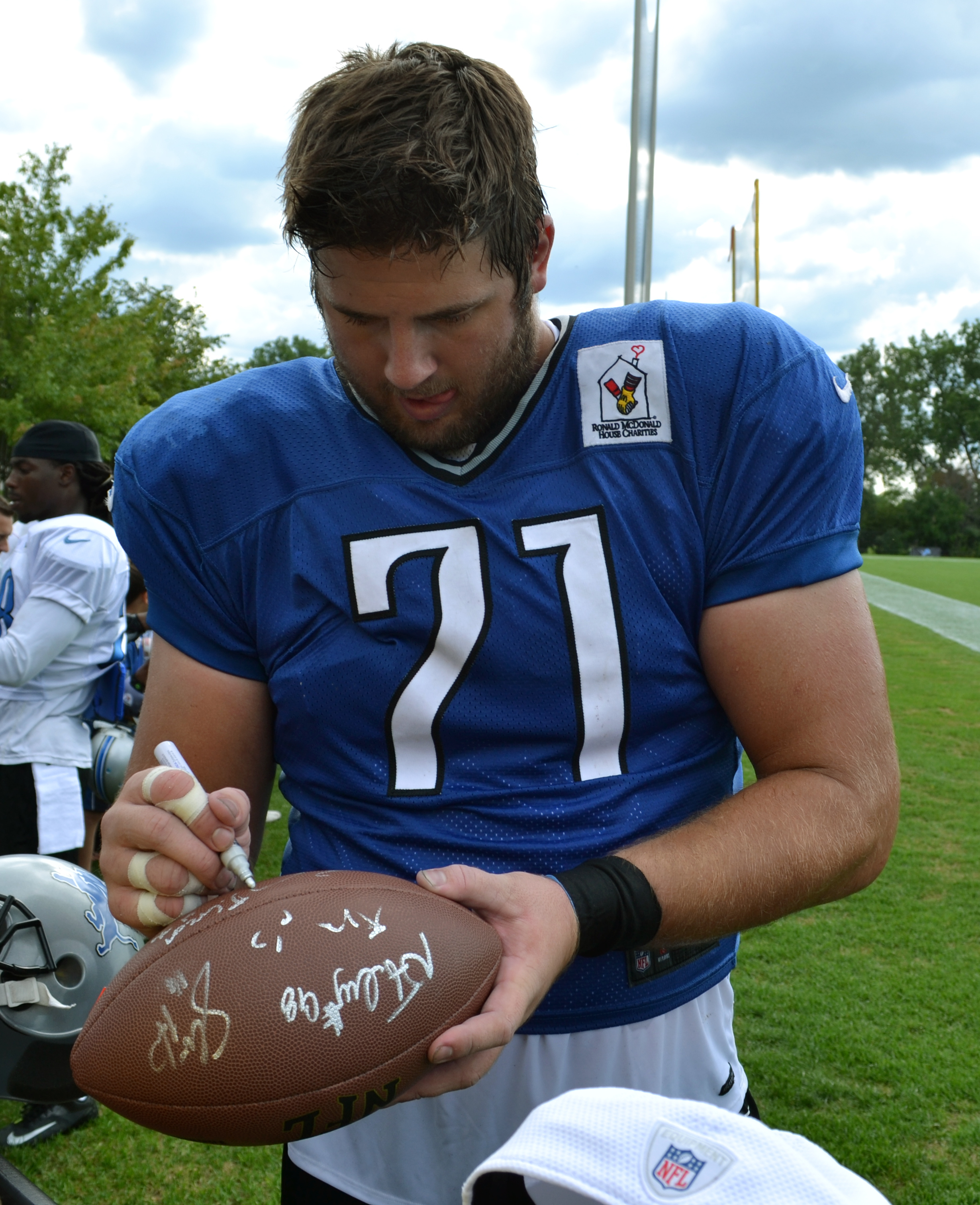
Reiff with the Lions in 2012

Reiff was selected by the Detroit Lions at 23rd overall in the 2012 NFL draft. He was the second of only two offensive tackles selected in the first round of the 2012 NFL Draft (behind Matt Kalil, who was selected 4th overall by the Vikings). Reiff's duties in his rookie campaign were limited to that of a blocking tight end/H-back. He earned his first career start in Week 4 against the Minnesota Vikings on September 30. Reiff had one start at the left tackle position coming in the teams Thanksgiving Day matchup against the Houston Texans. In Week 14, he rotated in the offensive line as usual and also returned a short kickoff for 10 yards. Despite his limited role in the 2012 season, Reiff was rated as the Lions top run blocker by Pro Football Focus (PFF). He was voted by his teammates for the Mel Farr Rookie of the Year Award.

==== 2013 season ====
After veteran Lions tackle Jeff Backus retired before the start of the 2013 season, Reiff took over his position at left tackle. He prepared for his expanded duties by adding over 12 pounds of muscle. He started at left tackle in the season opener game against Minnesota on September 8 and helped the Lions gain 481 yards of total offense. Reiff ended up starting all 16 games at left tackle and helped pave the way for 15 rushing touchdowns and an average of 392.1 net yards per game, the sixth-best mark in the league. Regarding to pass blocking, the Lions ranked second in the NFL in sacks allowed with 23.

==== 2014 season ====
In 2014, Reiff started his mainstay at left tackle in Week 1 against the New York Giants on September 8 and provided protection that led to 20 first downs for the Lions offense. He missed the first game of his NFL career due to injury on Thanksgiving Day, but rebounded to start all 15 games he played in.

==== 2015 season ====
On April 24, 2015, the Lions announced that they would pick up the fifth-year option of Reiff's contract.

=== Minnesota Vikings ===
On March 9, 2017, Reiff signed a five-year, $58.75 million contract with the Vikings. Per a source, Reiff received an $11 million signing bonus, a fully guaranteed base salary of $6.2 million in 2017, and a fully guaranteed base salary of $9.1 million in 2018 with a full guarantee at signing of $26.3 million. After 2018, the deal becomes a year-to-year proposition, with compensation of $9.5 million, $11 million, and $11.75 million in 2019, 2020, and 2021. Reiff entered his first season as a Vikings as their starting left tackle, where he started 15 games.

Reiff entered 2018 as the Vikings starting left tackle and a team captain, starting 13 games and missing three with a foot injury.

Reiff was placed on the reserve/COVID-19 list by the team on December 30, 2020. He was released after the season on March 10, 2021.

=== Cincinnati Bengals ===
On March 19, 2021, Reiff signed with the Cincinnati Bengals and was named their starting right tackle for the 2021 season, starting 12 games before being placed on injured reserve on December 16, 2021.

=== Chicago Bears ===
On July 26, 2022, Reiff signed with the Chicago Bears.

=== New England Patriots ===
On March 20, 2023, Reiff signed with the New England Patriots. He was placed on injured reserve on September 4. Reiff was activated on October 7. He was placed back on injured reserve on October 21, with a knee injury.

== Personal life ==
Before his time in the NFL, Reiff was a fan of the Oakland Raiders.

Reiff has a younger brother, Brady Reiff, who was a three-star recruit coming out of high school and played defensive end at Iowa from 2015 to 2019.
