= Brandon Wegher =

American football player (born 1990)

No. 32, 48
- Position: Running back

Personal information
- Born: December 9, 1990 (age 35); Dakota Dunes, South Dakota, U.S.
- Listed height: 5 ft 10 in (1.78 m)
- Listed weight: 215 lb (98 kg)

Career information
- High school: Bishop Heelan Catholic (Sioux City, Iowa)
- College: Iowa (2009–2010); Morningside (2013–2014)
- NFL draft: 2015: undrafted

Career history
- Carolina Panthers (2015); Los Angeles Rams (2016–2017)*
- * Offseason or practice squad member only
- Stats at Pro Football Reference

Brandon Wegher (/ˈweɪɡər/ WAY-ger) (born December 9, 1990) is an American former professional football player who was a running back for the Carolina Panthers and Los Angeles Rams of the National Football League.

== College career ==
He played college football for two seasons with the Iowa Hawkeyes. In 2009, he rushed for 641 yards and a Iowa freshman record eight touchdowns. He also played two seasons for Morningside University in 2013 and 2014, where he was an NAIA All-American. In 2014, he set a new NAIA rushing record with 2,610 yards. His younger brother, Jack Wegher, played running back in three games during the 2016–2017 season at Purdue University. (Note: "Jack Wegher Game by Game Stats and Performance". ESPN.) His father, Rick, played college football at South Dakota State University (Note: GoJacksVideoVault (2018-06-04). Rick Wegher Runs Thru Augie. YouTube.) and later professionally in Canada.

== Professional career ==
=== Carolina Panthers ===
After going unselected in the 2015 NFL draft, Wegher signed with the Carolina Panthers. He was inactive for all but one game in 2015.

On February 7, 2016, Wegher's Panthers played in Super Bowl 50. He was inactive for the game. In the game, the Panthers fell to the Denver Broncos by a score of 24–10.

On September 3, 2016, Wegher was waived by the Panthers as part of final roster cuts.

=== Los Angeles Rams ===
On December 20, 2016, Wegher was signed to the Los Angeles Rams' practice squad. He signed a reserve/future contract with the Rams on January 3, 2017. On May 3, 2017, he was waived by the Rams.
