= Allen Reisner =

American football player (born 1988)

No. 83, 87, 89
- Position: Tight end

Personal information
- Born: September 29, 1988 (age 38); Marion, Iowa, U.S.
- Listed height: 6 ft 3 in (1.91 m)
- Listed weight: 255 lb (116 kg)

Career information
- High school: Marion
- College: Iowa
- NFL draft: 2011: undrafted

Career history
- Minnesota Vikings (2011–2012); Jacksonville Jaguars (2012–2013); Minnesota Vikings (2014)*; New England Patriots (2014); Baltimore Ravens (2014–2015)
- * Offseason or practice squad member only

Awards and highlights
- Second-team All-Big Ten (2010)

Career NFL statistics
- Receptions: 7
- Receiving yards: 58
- Stats at Pro Football Reference

Allen Reisner (born September 29, 1988) is an American former professional football player who was a tight end in the National Football League (NFL). He played college football for the Iowa Hawkeyes.

== Professional career ==
=== Minnesota Vikings ===
Reisner was signed by the Minnesota Vikings as an undrafted free agent following the end of the NFL lockout on July 26, 2011. Reisner was released from the Vikings on October 4, 2011. Reisner was signed back to the Vikings October 5, 2011 and placed on practice squad. He was signed to the Minnesota Vikings on November 26, 2011.

=== Jacksonville Jaguars ===
Reisner was claimed off waivers by the Jacksonville Jaguars on December 24, 2012.

On October 8, 2013, Reisner was placed on the injured reserve-designated for return list. He returned to the active roster on December 14.

=== Second stint with Minnesota ===
Reisner re-signed with the Minnesota Vikings on April 15, 2014. However, despite finishing with the most touchdowns and most receptions for the Vikings in the 2014 preseason, he was cut by the team on August 30, 2014, as the roster was reduced to 53 for the season ahead.

=== Baltimore Ravens ===
Reisner was signed by the Baltimore Ravens on November 17, 2014. He was later waived on December 3, 2014, but re-signed on December 9, 2014.

== Personal life ==
On July 6, 2013, Reisner married longtime girlfriend and high school sweetheart, Lauren Perry, daughter of Syncbak founder Jack Perry.
