= Brett Greenwood =

American football player (born 1987)

No. 30 – Iowa Hawkeyes
- Position: Safety

Personal information
- Born: September 14, 1987

Career information
- College: Iowa (2010)

Awards and highlights
- 2× Second-team All-Big Ten (2009, 2010)
- Stats at Pro Football Reference

Brett Greenwood (born September 14, 1987) is a former defensive back for the Iowa Hawkeyes college football team.

Greenwood was a walk-on freshman for the team, starting for the Hawkeyes for three seasons. He was a member of the NFL's Pittsburgh Steelers pre-season squad in 2011 and was cut prior to the season's start.

== Injury ==
On the afternoon of September 9, 2011, Greenwood was working out on the football field of his former high school (Pleasant Valley High School in Bettendorf, Iowa), when he collapsed from a heart arrhythmia. When attempts to resuscitate him failed, he was rushed to Trinity Medical Center in Bettendorf, before being airlifted to University of Iowa Hospitals and Clinics. Although he survived the episode, it caused serious neurological injuries. As of July 2012, he is still recovering from his injuries, receiving physical therapy five days per week.

For the Iowa Hawkeye football game on September 24, 2011, against Louisiana-Monroe, attending fans were encouraged to wear green for a "green-out", in honor of the former standout.

The Brett Greenwood Foundation has been established to provide a donation fund that will be used to support the University of Iowa Hospitals and Clinics, as well as Iowa's athletics department in the form of an endowed scholarship in Brett's name.

The Iowa Hawkeyes named Brett Greenwood the honorary captain during the September 19th, 2015 football game against the Pittsburgh Panthers, as he continues to recover from this traumatic injury. He led the Hawkeye football team out of the stadium tunnel, defying the odds that he would ever walk or talk again.
