= Shaun Prater =

American football player (born 1989)

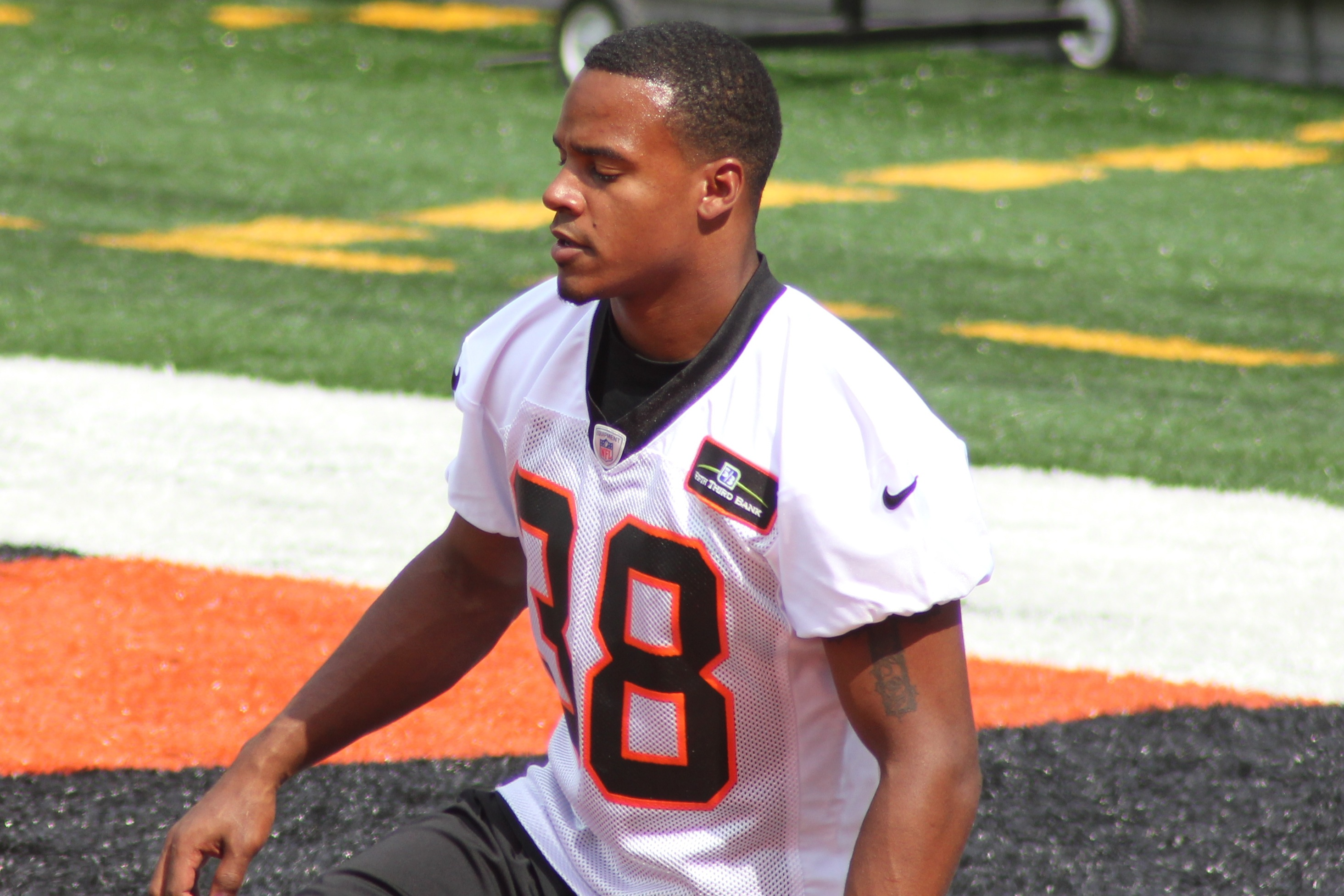
- Prater with the Cincinnati Bengals

No. 31, 27, 26
- Position: Cornerback

Personal information
- Born: October 27, 1989 (age 37); Omaha, Nebraska, U.S.
- Listed height: 5 ft 10 in (1.78 m)
- Listed weight: 190 lb (86 kg)

Career information
- High school: Omaha Central
- College: Iowa
- NFL draft: 2012: 5th round, 156th overall pick

Career history
- Cincinnati Bengals (2012); Philadelphia Eagles (2013); Minnesota Vikings (2013–2014); Indianapolis Colts (2015); Minnesota Vikings (2015); Denver Broncos (2015); Arizona Cardinals (2016)*
- * Offseason or practice squad member only

Awards and highlights
- 2× First-team All-Big Ten (2010, 2011)

Career NFL statistics
- Total tackles: 10
- Pass deflections: 1
- Interceptions: 1
- Stats at Pro Football Reference

Shaun Prater (born October 27, 1989) is an American former professional football player who was a cornerback in the National Football League (NFL). After playing college football for the Iowa Hawkeyes, he was selected by the Cincinnati Bengals in the fifth round of the 2012 NFL draft.

He was also a member of the Philadelphia Eagles, Minnesota Vikings, Indianapolis Colts, Denver Broncos, and Arizona Cardinals.

== Early life ==
Prater attended Omaha Central High School in Omaha, Nebraska. He played mainly safety, but also saw time at wide receiver as a senior. He had 177 tackles, five interceptions, 20 passes defended, five sacks, six forced fumbles and two fumble recoveries. He also had 10 carries for 185 yards along with 12 receptions for 290 yards and four touchdowns.

In addition to football, he also ran track and field. He won the 400-meter dash at the 2007 Omaha South Invite with a time of 49.6 seconds. At the 2007 Nebraska State High School Championships, he finished second in the 400 meters, with a career-best time of 48.52 seconds, and third in the 200 meters, with another career-best time of 21.58 seconds.

== College career ==
Prater accepted a scholarship offer from Kirk Ferentz and attended the University of Iowa, where he played cornerback for the Hawkeyes. Prater was selected First-team All-Big Ten in 2010 and 2011.

== Professional career ==
Pre-draft measurables
Height	Weight	Arm length	Hand span	40-yard dash	10-yard split	20-yard split	20-yard shuttle	Bench press
5 ft 10 1/8 in (1.78 m)	190 lb (86 kg)	30 3/4 in (0.78 m)	8 1/2 in (0.22 m)	4.50 s	1.55 s	2.53 s	4.25 s	14 reps
All values from NFL Combine/Pro Day

=== Cincinnati Bengals ===
Prater was selected by the Cincinnati Bengals in the fifth round (156th overall) of the 2012 NFL draft. He was placed on injured reserve on August 24, 2012.

=== Philadelphia Eagles ===
On September 1, 2013, the Philadelphia Eagles claimed Prater off waivers. On October 21, the Philadelphia Eagles released Prater to make room for the signing of Emmanuel Acho.

=== Minnesota Vikings (first stint) ===
On October 22, 2013, the Minnesota Vikings claimed Prater off waivers. The team released him on September 4, 2015. Then signed again with the Vikings on December 8, 2015.

=== Indianapolis Colts ===
The Indianapolis Colts signed Prater on September 29, 2015. He was released on October 2, 2015, but re-signed on October 4. Prater was waived on October 20.

=== Minnesota Vikings (second stint) ===
On December 8, 2015, Prater re-signed with the Vikings. He was waived by the Vikings on December 14.

=== Denver Broncos ===
The Denver Broncos signed Prater on December 22, 2015. A week later he was waived by the team without playing a single game for them.

=== Arizona Cardinals ===
On February 1, 2016, Prater signed a futures contract with the Arizona Cardinals. On August 29, 2016, Prater was waived by the Cardinals.
