= Karl Klug =

American football player and coach (born 1988)

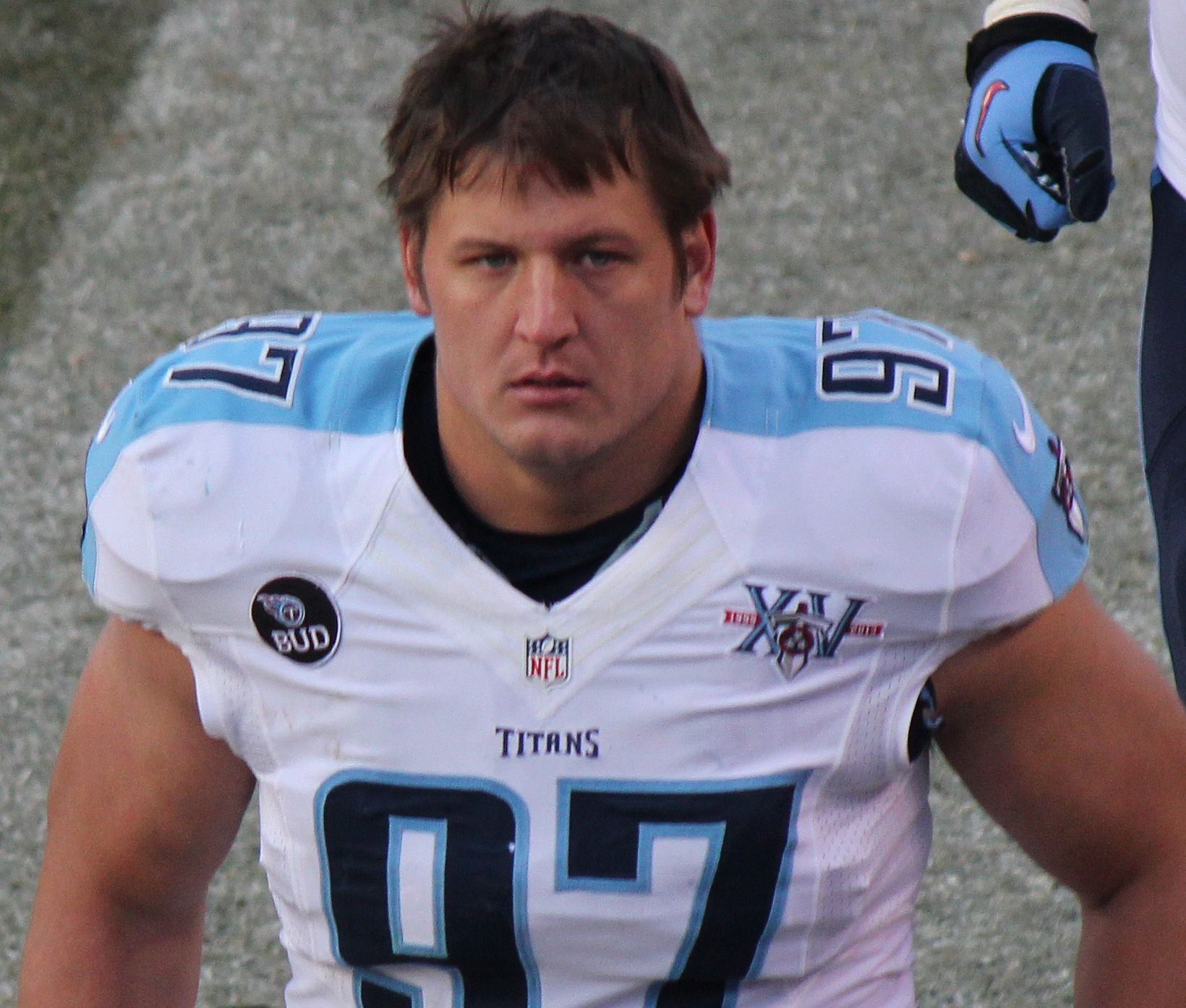
- Klug with the Tennessee Titans in 2013

No. 97
- Position: Defensive end

Personal information
- Born: March 31, 1988 (age 38); La Crosse, Wisconsin, U.S.
- Listed height: 6 ft 3 in (1.91 m)
- Listed weight: 278 lb (126 kg)

Career information
- High school: Caledonia (Caledonia, Minnesota)
- College: Iowa (2006–2010)
- NFL draft: 2011: 5th round, 142nd overall pick

Career history

Playing
- Tennessee Titans (2011–2017)

Coaching
- Fred J. Page High School Defensive line coach (2018–present)

Awards and highlights
- Second-team All-Big Ten (2010)

Career NFL statistics
- Total tackles: 128
- Sacks: 21.5
- Forced fumbles: 5
- Fumble recoveries: 1
- Stats at Pro Football Reference

Karl Klug (born March 31, 1988) is an American former professional football player who was a defensive end for his entire seven-year career with the Tennessee Titans of the National Football League (NFL). He played college football for the Iowa Hawkeyes.

== College career ==
During his four-year career at Iowa, Klug appeared in 40 games with 26 consecutive starts to end his career. He tallied 140 tackles, including 31 for loss, 9.5 sacks, eight quarterback pressures, eight passes defensed, four forced fumbles and a fumble recovery.

== Professional career ==
Pre-draft measurables
| Height | Weight | Arm length | Hand span | Wingspan | 40-yard dash | 10-yard split | 20-yard split | 20-yard shuttle | Three-cone drill | Vertical jump | Broad jump | Bench press |
|---|---|---|---|---|---|---|---|---|---|---|---|---|
| 6 ft 3 in (1.91 m) | 275 lb (125 kg) | 32 1/4 in (0.82 m) | 9 1/2 in (0.24 m) | 6 ft 6 in (1.98 m) | 4.85 s | 1.66 s | 2.83 s | 4.53 s | 7.03 s | 29.5 in (0.75 m) | 9 ft 5 in (2.87 m) | 22 reps |
All values from NFL Combine/Pro Day

Klug was selected by the Tennessee Titans in the fifth round of the 2011 NFL draft, 142nd overall. In the 2011 NFL season, Klug led all rookie defensive tackles with 7 sacks, which exceeded initial expectations.

On March 13, 2015, Klug and the Titans agreed to a two-year contract extension.

In 2016, Klug appeared in 14 games with three starts recording 26 tackles, 1.5 sacks, and one pass defensed before suffering a torn Achilles in Week 15 and was placed on injured reserve.

On March 9, 2017, Klug re-signed with the Titans.

On March 17, 2018, Klug was released by the Titans.

== NFL career statistics ==
Legend
| | Led the league |
| **Bold** | Career high |

=== Regular season ===
| Year | Team | Games | | Tackles | | | | | Interceptions | | | | | Fumbles | | | |
| Year | Team | GP | GS | Cmb | Solo | Ast | Sck | TFL | Int | Yds | TD | Lng | PD | FF | FR | Yds | TD |
|---|---|---|---|---|---|---|---|---|---|---|---|---|---|---|---|---|---|
| 2011 | TEN | **16** | 1 | 20 | **18** | 2 | **7.0** | 7 | 0 | 0 | 0 | 0 | **4** | **2** | 0 | 0 | 0 |
| 2012 | TEN | **16** | 1 | 7 | 4 | 3 | 3.5 | 3 | 0 | 0 | 0 | 0 | 1 | 0 | 0 | 0 | 0 |
| 2013 | TEN | **16** | **3** | 14 | 8 | 6 | 2.0 | 3 | 0 | 0 | 0 | 0 | 2 | **2** | **1** | 0 | **1** |
| 2014 | TEN | **16** | 0 | 23 | **18** | 5 | 2.0 | **9** | 0 | 0 | 0 | 0 | 0 | 0 | 0 | 0 | 0 |
| 2015 | TEN | **16** | 0 | 20 | 13 | 7 | 4.0 | 3 | 0 | 0 | 0 | 0 | 0 | 1 | 0 | 0 | 0 |
| 2016 | TEN | 14 | **3** | **26** | 13 | **13** | 1.5 | 2 | 0 | 0 | 0 | 0 | 1 | 0 | 0 | 0 | 0 |
| 2017 | TEN | 15 | 0 | 18 | 13 | 5 | 1.5 | 3 | 0 | 0 | 0 | 0 | 0 | 0 | 0 | 0 | 0 |
| | | 109 | 8 | 128 | 87 | 41 | 21.5 | 30 | 0 | 0 | 0 | 0 | 8 | 5 | 1 | 0 | 1 |

=== Playoffs ===
| Year | Team | Games | | Tackles | | | | | Interceptions | | | | | Fumbles | | | |
| Year | Team | GP | GS | Cmb | Solo | Ast | Sck | TFL | Int | Yds | TD | Lng | PD | FF | FR | Yds | TD |
|---|---|---|---|---|---|---|---|---|---|---|---|---|---|---|---|---|---|
| 2017 | TEN | **2** | 0 | 0 | 0 | 0 | 0.0 | 0 | 0 | 0 | 0 | 0 | 0 | 0 | 0 | 0 | 0 |
| | | 2 | 0 | 0 | 0 | 0 | 0.0 | 0 | 0 | 0 | 0 | 0 | 0 | 0 | 0 | 0 | 0 |

== Coaching career ==
In 2018, Klug was hired as a defensive line coach at Page High School in Franklin, Tennessee, having previously volunteered with the school during his playing career.
