= Julian Vandervelde =

American football player (born 1987)

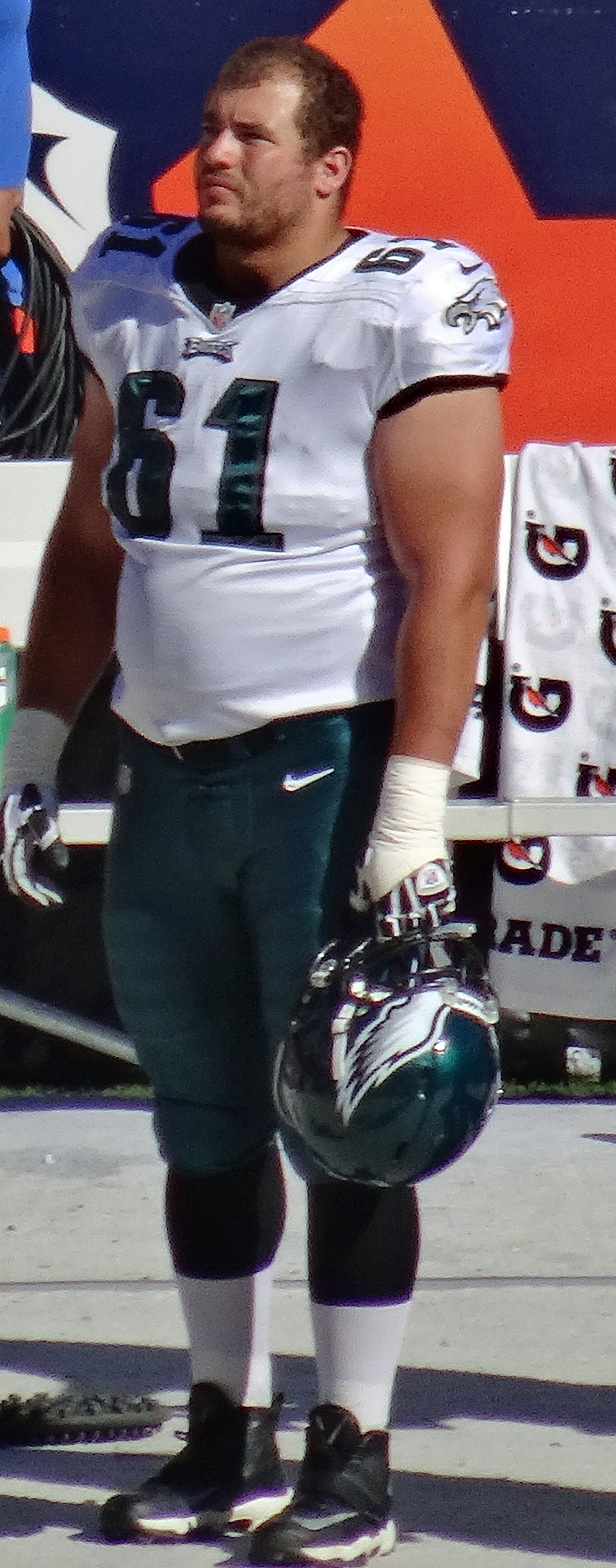
- Vandervelde with the Philadelphia Eagles in 2013

No. 73, 61
- Position: Center

Personal information
- Born: October 7, 1987 (age 39); Davenport, Iowa, U.S.
- Listed height: 6 ft 2 in (1.88 m)
- Listed weight: 300 lb (136 kg)

Career information
- High school: Davenport Central
- College: Iowa
- NFL draft: 2011: 5th round, 161st overall pick

Career history
- Philadelphia Eagles (2011); Tampa Bay Buccaneers (2011–2012)*; Philadelphia Eagles (2012–2015); Quad City Steamwheelers (2018)
- * Offseason or practice squad member only

Awards and highlights
- Second-team All-Big Ten (2010)

Career NFL statistics
- Games played: 18
- Stats at Pro Football Reference

Julian Vandervelde (born October 7, 1987) is an American former professional football player who was a center in the National Football League (NFL). He was selected by the Philadelphia Eagles in the fifth round of the 2011 NFL draft with the 161st overall pick. He played college football for the Iowa Hawkeyes and was a prep at Davenport Central High School in Davenport, Iowa. He began his NFL career playing guard, but was reassigned as a center at the beginning of the 2013 season. Vandervelde holds the record for most NFL contracts signed with 21.

Pre-draft measurables
Height	Weight	Arm length	Hand span	Wingspan	40-yard dash	10-yard split	20-yard split	20-yard shuttle	Three-cone drill	Vertical jump	Broad jump	Bench press
6 ft 1 7/8 in (1.88 m)	301 lb (137 kg)	32 3/4 in (0.83 m)	9 5/8 in (0.24 m)	6 ft 4 7/8 in (1.95 m)	5.13 s	1.69 s	2.95 s	4.44 s	7.27 s	31.0 in (0.79 m)	9 ft 0 in (2.74 m)	25 reps
All values from NFL Combine/Pro Day
