= Jewel Hampton =

American gridiron football player (born 1989)

No. 29, 33
- Position: Running back

Personal information
- Born: December 23, 1989 (age 36); Indianapolis, Indiana, U.S.
- Listed height: 5 ft 9 in (1.75 m)
- Listed weight: 210 lb (95 kg)

Career information
- High school: Warren Central (Indianapolis, Indiana)
- College: Southern Illinois
- NFL draft: 2012: undrafted

Career history
- San Francisco 49ers (2012–2013); Montreal Alouettes (2015)*
- * Offseason or practice squad member only
- Stats at Pro Football Reference

Jewel Hampton (born December 23, 1989) is an American former football running back. He played college football at Southern Illinois and signed with the San Francisco 49ers as an undrafted free agent in 2012.

== Early life ==
He attended Warren Central High School in Indianapolis. He was named to the First-team All-State in his senior season after he rushed for 2,095 rushing yards and 27 rushing touchdowns.

== College career ==
=== University of Iowa ===
He played three seasons at Iowa and finished with a total of 577 rushing yards, 8 rushing touchdowns, 3 receptions and 6 receiving yards and one receiving touchdown.

=== Southern Illinois ===
In his Junior season at Southern Illinois, he was selected as MVFC Newcomer of the Year following the conclusion of the season. He was selected to the Second-team All-Conference team in his senior season. He was named to the MVFC All-Newcomer team. He was a two-time MVFC Newcomer of the Week during his junior season.

== Professional career ==
=== San Francisco 49ers ===
On May 1, 2012, Hampton signed with the San Francisco 49ers as an undrafted free agent. On July 23, 2012, he was placed on the Non-Football Injury list for undisclosed injury. On November 27, 2012, he was activated from the Non-Football Injury list. The 49ers waived Hampton on August 25, 2014.

=== Montreal Alouettes ===
On June 4, 2015, Hampton signed with the Montreal Alouettes of the Canadian Football League. On June 15, 2016, Hampton was released.
