= Keenan Davis =

American football player (born 1991)

No. 6
- Position: Wide receiver

Personal information
- Born: January 30, 1991 (age 35); Cedar Rapids, Iowa, U.S.
- Listed height: 6 ft 2 in (1.88 m)
- Listed weight: 218 lb (99 kg)

Career information
- High school: Cedar Rapids (IA) Washington
- College: Iowa
- NFL draft: 2013: undrafted

Career history
- Cleveland Browns (2013); Miami Dolphins (2013); Spokane Shock (2015)*
- * Offseason or practice squad member only

Keenan Davis (born January 30, 1991) is an American former football wide receiver. He was signed by the Miami Dolphins and the Cleveland Browns as an undrafted free agent in 2013. He played college football at Iowa.

== Professional career ==
Davis was signed as an undrafted free agent by the Cleveland Browns on April 27, 2013. He was released by the Cleveland Browns on July 24, 2013. Davis was signed by the Miami Dolphins on July 31, 2013. He was released on August 31, 2013.

On November 17, 2014, Davis was assigned to the Spokane Shock of the Arena Football League. He was placed on recallable reassignment on March 14, 2015.
