= Adrian Clayborn =

American football player (born 1988)

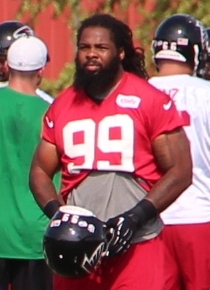
- Clayborn with the Atlanta Falcons in 2015

No. 94, 99
- Position: Defensive end

Personal information
- Born: July 6, 1988 (age 38); St. Louis, Missouri, U.S.
- Listed height: 6 ft 3 in (1.91 m)
- Listed weight: 280 lb (127 kg)

Career information
- High school: Webster Groves (Webster Groves, Missouri)
- College: Iowa (2006–2010)
- NFL draft: 2011: 1st round, 20th overall pick

Career history
- Tampa Bay Buccaneers (2011–2014); Atlanta Falcons (2015–2017); New England Patriots (2018); Atlanta Falcons (2019); Cleveland Browns (2020)

Awards and highlights
- Super Bowl champion (LIII); Consensus All-American (2010); 2× First-team All-Big Ten (2009, 2010)

Career NFL statistics
- Total tackles: 208
- Sacks: 40.0
- Forced fumbles: 11
- Fumble recoveries: 4
- Pass deflections: 2
- Defensive touchdowns: 2
- Stats at Pro Football Reference

Adrian Jarrell Clayborn (born July 6, 1988) is an American former professional football player who was a defensive end in the National Football League (NFL). He played college football for the University of Iowa, and earned consensus All-American honors. He was selected by the Tampa Bay Buccaneers in the first round of the 2011 NFL draft. Clayborn also played for the Atlanta Falcons, Cleveland Browns and New England Patriots. With the Patriots, he won Super Bowl LIII over the Los Angeles Rams. Clayborn is one of 6 NFL players to record 6 sacks in a game, doing so as a member of the Falcons in 2017.

== Early life ==
Clayborn was born in St. Louis, Missouri. At birth, he suffered from a condition known as Erb's Palsy, something that is caused during birth by an injury to the nerves surrounding a child's shoulder. Because his head and neck were pulled to the side as his shoulders passed through the birth canal, he suffered nerve damage resulting in the loss of some movement and weakness in his right arm. Clayborn underwent physical therapy throughout his young life and eventually overcame the limitations caused by the disability.

When Adrian was 10, his older brother Anthony was shot and killed in northern St. Louis. He was survived by his seven children.

Clayborn attended high school at Webster Groves High School, where he was a four-year letterman in football and basketball.

=== Awards and honors ===
- 2005 Missouri Player of the Year
- 2005 Missouri All-State
- 2004 Missouri All-State

== College career ==
Clayborn attended the University of Iowa, and played for the Iowa Hawkeyes football team from 2006 to 2010. He took a redshirt year in 2006, his first season at Iowa. In 2007, Clayborn became a second-string defensive lineman and saw action in several games on special teams. In 2008, Clayborn saw substantial playing time, recording eight tackles for loss and 50 total tackles. In 2009, Clayborn had a breakout year with 20 tackles for loss. In a dominant effort against Georgia Tech, Clayborn was named Orange Bowl MVP.

Heading into the 2010 season, Clayborn was listed on the preseason watch list for several awards. ESPN, Playboy Magazine, Sporting News, College Football Insiders, Lindy's, and Phil Steele all selected Clayborn for their pre-season first-team All-American lists.

On October 2, 2010, Clayborn had his first break-out game of 2010. He had three tackles for loss against Penn State despite being triple-teamed for parts of the game. His play earned him Big Ten Defensive Player of the Week. On November 10, 2010, Clayborn was named one of four finalists for the Lombardi Award.

While preparing for the 2010 Insight Bowl, Iowa head coach Kirk Ferentz announced that Clayborn was one of three Hawkeyes invited to attend the Senior Bowl, college football's pre-draft event featuring seniors with NFL prospects.

=== Awards and honors ===
==== 2010 ====
- Consensus First-team All-American by NCAA, AFCA and Walter Camp.
- First-team All-Big Ten (Coaches, Media)
- American Football Coaches Association First-team All-American
- Ted Hendricks Award Finalist
- Rotary Lombardi Award Finalist
- Rotary Lombardi Award Pre-season Watch List
- Bednarik Award Semi-finalist
- Bednarik Award Pre-season Watch List
- Walter Camp Player of the Year Watch List
- Bronko Nagurski Trophy Watch List
- Playboy Magazine Pre-season All-America Team selection
- College Football Performance Award Honorable Mention
- Big Ten Defensive Player of the Week – October 4, 2010

==== 2009 ====
- Big Ten Player of the Week – October 25, 2009
- Big Ten Defensive Player of The Week
- 2010 Orange Bowl MVP

== Professional career ==
Pre-draft measurables
Height	Weight	Arm length	Hand span	Wingspan	40-yard dash	10-yard split	20-yard split	20-yard shuttle	Three-cone drill	Vertical jump	Broad jump	Bench press
6 ft 2 5/8 in (1.90 m)	281 lb (127 kg)	32 1/2 in (0.83 m)	9 3/4 in (0.25 m)	6 ft 2 1/4 in (1.89 m)	4.78 s	1.61 s	2.69 s	4.13 s	7.08 s	35.5 in (0.90 m)	9 ft 6 in (2.90 m)	17 reps
All values from NFL Combine and Iowa Pro Day

=== Tampa Bay Buccaneers ===
Clayborn was selected in the first round (20th overall) of the 2011 NFL draft by the Tampa Bay Buccaneers. Clayborn recorded his first sack in week 3 of the 2011 season against the Atlanta Falcons. His sack on Matt Ryan also caused a fumble recovered by teammate Michael Bennett. He finished the 2011 season with 7.5 sacks, 42 total tackles, and three forced fumbles.

In 2012, Clayborn was placed on injured reserve after injuring his knee. He played in three games on the year.

In the 2013 season, Clayborn had 5.5 sacks, 64 total tackles, one pass defended, and two forced fumbles.

Before the 2014 season, it was announced by new general manager Jason Licht that the Buccaneers would not be picking up the fifth year option on his rookie contract. He was also moved to the left side since the team signed Michael Johnson for the right side. He suffered yet another season-ending injury after playing in one game. He was placed him on IR and his future in Tampa in doubt since he would be an unrestricted free agent in 2015.

=== Atlanta Falcons (first stint) ===
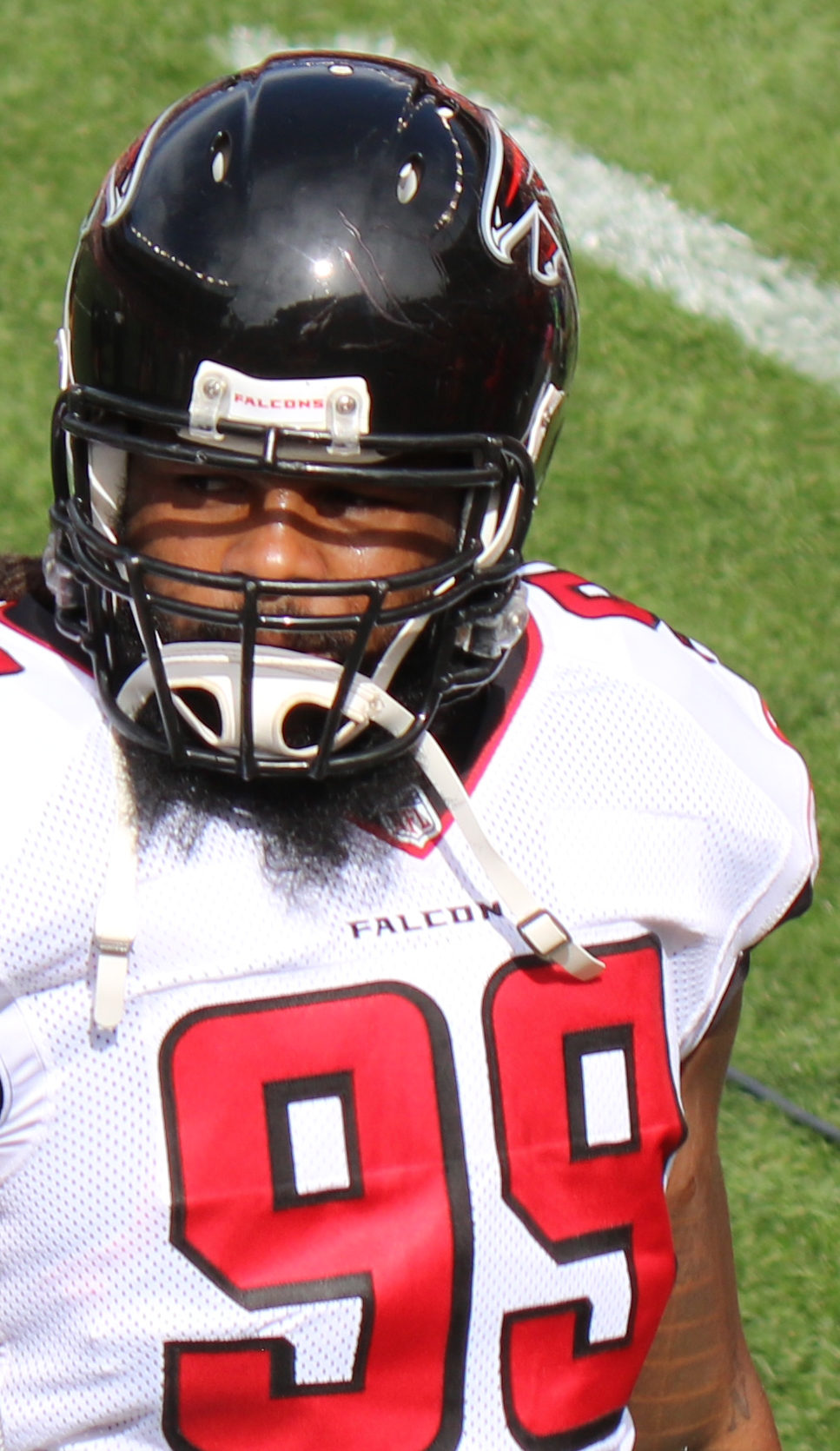
Clayborn with the Falcons in 2016

On March 12, 2015, Clayborn signed with the Atlanta Falcons. In the 2015 season, Clayborn had three sacks, 15 total tackles, and one fumble recovery in 16 games and four starts.

On March 9, 2016, he re-signed with the Falcons on a two-year deal worth $9 million. He played in 13 games with seven starts recording 22 tackles and 4.5 sacks. In the Divisional Round of the playoffs against the Seattle Seahawks, Clayborn suffered a torn bicep and was placed on injured reserve on January 17, 2017, causing him to miss the rest of the playoffs. Without Clayborn, the Falcons reached Super Bowl LI where they lost 34–28 in overtime to the New England Patriots.

On November 12, 2017, in Week 10 against the Dallas Cowboys, Clayborn recorded a franchise-record six sacks, one away from tying Derrick Thomas' record of seven, as the Falcons won the game 27–7. He was named the NFC Defensive Player of the Week days later.

=== New England Patriots ===
On March 17, 2018, Clayborn signed a two-year $10 million contract with the New England Patriots. In Clayborn's first season in New England, Clayborn recorded 11 tackles and 2.5 sacks in 14 games and one start. With Clayborn, the Patriots went on to win Super Bowl LIII 13–3 against the Los Angeles Rams to give Clayborn his first championship.

On March 15, 2019, Clayborn was released by the Patriots.

=== Atlanta Falcons (second stint) ===
On April 9, 2019, Clayborn signed a one-year $4 million contract with the Falcons. In Week 2 against the Philadelphia Eagles, Clayborn recorded his first sack of the season in the 24–20 win. In Week 10 against the New Orleans Saints, Clayborn had one sack in the 26–9 win. In Week 11 against the Carolina Panthers, Clayborn had two sacks in the 29–3 win. Clayborn played in 15 games with one start, recording 18 tackles, four sacks and two forced fumbles.

=== Cleveland Browns ===
On April 9, 2020, Clayborn signed a two-year, $6 million contract with the Cleveland Browns. He finished the season with 3.5 sacks and a forced fumble in 15 games and two starts.

Clayborn was released by the Browns on March 9, 2021.

== NFL career statistics ==
Year	Team	Games		Tackles				Fumbles				Interceptions			
Year	Team	GP	GS	Comb	Solo	Ast	Sack	FF	FR	Yds	TD	PD	Int	Yds	TD
2011	TB	16	16	42	29	13	7.5	3	0	0	0	0	0	0	0
2012	TB	3	3	2	1	1	0.0	0	0	0	0	0	0	0	0
2013	TB	16	16	64	43	21	5.5	2	0	0	0	1	0	0	0
2014	TB	1	1	1	1	0	0.0	0	0	0	0	0	0	0	0
2015	ATL	16	4	15	14	1	3.0	0	1	0	0	0	0	0	0
2016	ATL	13	7	22	19	3	4.5	0	1	5	1	0	0	0	0
2017	ATL	16	2	21	17	4	9.5	2	2	10	1	0	0	0	0
2018	NE	14	1	11	9	2	2.5	1	0	0	0	0	0	0	0
2019	ATL	15	1	18	12	6	4.0	2	0	0	0	0	0	0	0
2020	CLE	15	2	12	6	6	3.5	1	0	0	0	1	0	0	0
Career		125	53	208	151	57	40.0	11	4	15	2	2	0	0	0
