= 2009 Big Ten Conference football season =

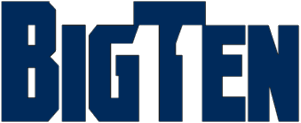
- League: NCAA Division I FBS (Football Bowl Subdivision)
- Sport: football
- Duration: September 3, 2009 through January 7, 2010
- Teams: 11
- TV partner(s): ABC, ESPN, ESPN2, Big Ten Network

2010 NFL Draft
- Top draft pick: Brandon Graham (Michigan)
- Picked by: Philadelphia Eagles, 1st round (13th overall)

Regular Season
- Champion: Ohio State
- Runners-up: Iowa / Penn State
- Season MVP: Brandon Graham / Daryll Clark

Football seasons
- 2008 2010

2009 Big Ten Conference football standings
	Conf.			Overall
Team	W		L	W		L
No. 5 Ohio State $	7	–	1	11	–	2
No. 7 Iowa %	6	–	2	11	–	2
No. 9 Penn State	6	–	2	11	–	2
Northwestern	5	–	3	8	–	5
No. 16 Wisconsin	5	–	3	10	–	3
Michigan State	4	–	4	6	–	7
Purdue	4	–	4	5	–	7
Minnesota	3	–	5	6	–	7
Illinois	2	–	6	3	–	9
Michigan	1	–	7	5	–	7
Indiana	1	–	7	4	–	8
$ – BCS representative as conference champion; % – BCS at-large representative; Rankings from AP Poll

The 2009 Big Ten Conference football season was the 114th for the conference and saw Ohio State conclude the regular season as Big Ten Conference champion for the 5th consecutive time, their 34th Big Ten title. This earned them the conference's automatic selection to a Bowl Championship Series game in which it emerged victorious in the January 1, 2010 Rose Bowl against Oregon Ducks. Co-runner-up, Iowa, earned the conference's at-large BCS invitation to the January 5, 2010 Orange Bowl. The season started on Thursday, September 3, as conference member Indiana hosted Eastern Kentucky. The conference's other 10 teams began their respective 2009 season of NCAA Division I FBS (Football Bowl Subdivision) competition two days later. All teams started their season at home except Illinois who started their season on neutral turf for the third consecutive season against Missouri and Minnesota who traveled to Syracuse.

Although several players had post season All-star games remaining, the season concluded for Big Ten teams with the 2010 Orange Bowl in which Iowa defeated Georgia Tech. This was the seventh bowl game for the conference which compiled a 4–3 record. Over the course of 77 home games, the conference set a new attendance record. During the season, Minnesota opened a new athletic stadium, TCF Bank Stadium, and Purdue welcomed a new head coach, Danny Hope.

The season saw John Clay selected as offensive player of the year by both the coaches and the media. Jared Odrick and Greg Jones won defensive player of the year awards from the coaches and media, respectively. Chicago Tribune Silver Football recipients as the Big Ten co-MVPs were Daryll Clark and Brandon Graham. Jones was the conferences only consensus 2009 College Football All-America Team representative. The Big Ten Conference enjoyed two national statistical championships. Graham led the nation in tackles for a loss (TFL). Ray Fisher earned the national statistical championship in kickoff return average and established a new Big Ten single-season record with his performance. The Big Ten led the nation with six first team Academic All-Americans. After the season, 34 athletes were selected in the 2010 NFL draft including three in the first round and six each by Iowa and Penn State.

== Previous season ==
During the 2008 NCAA Division I FBS football season, Ohio State won its fourth consecutive Big Ten championship while co-champion Penn State won its second in four years. Although the two teams tied with 7–1 conference records, Penn State earned the conference's automatic Bowl Championship Series selection due to a head-to-head victory. The two teams have been the only teams from the conference to win a Big Ten championship in the past four seasons.

During the season, every home game was televised nationally and 98 percent of the Big Ten's games were nationally aired far exceeding all other conferences, none of whom had even 75 percent of their games televised.

== Preseason ==
In a given year, each Big Ten team will play eight of the other Big Ten teams. Thus for any given team in a given year, there are two others which will not be competed against. Below is the breakdown of each team and its two "no-plays" for 2009:

- Illinois: Iowa, Wisconsin
- Indiana: Michigan State, Minnesota
- Iowa: Illinois, Purdue
- Michigan: Minnesota, Northwestern
- Michigan State: Indiana, Ohio State
- Minnesota: Indiana, Michigan
- Northwestern: Michigan, Ohio State
- Ohio State: Michigan State, Northwestern
- Penn State: Purdue, Wisconsin
- Purdue: Iowa, Penn State
- Wisconsin: Illinois, Penn State

The Big Ten Conference announced on July 27 that the big ten media had elected Ohio State as the preseason favorite for the 2009 football season. It had ranked Penn State second and Michigan State third. It chose Ohio State quarterback Terrelle Pryor the Preseason Offensive Player of the Year and Michigan State linebacker Greg Jones the Preseason Defensive Player of the Year.

In the Preseason Coaches' Poll released on August 7, the Big Ten was one of only three conferences with multiple teams ranked in the top ten.

The College Football Hall of Fame has selected Iowa's Larry Station (1982–85), Ohio State's Chris Spielman (1984–87) and Penn State's Curt Warner (1979–82) for December induction. 28 Big Ten athletes were selected in the 2009 National Football League Draft in late April, including four first-round picks. Two additional players were selected in the 2009 Major League Baseball draft.

== Watchlists ==
According to the Big Ten Conference at the beginning of the season: "The Big Ten now features 51 student-athletes on preseason watch lists for 19 different national awards. Among the honored conference players, 27 appear on more than one list and five Big Ten standouts lead the way by appearing on five different lists. Every Big Ten team has at least one player appearing on a watch list. Iowa, Ohio State and Penn State top all Big Ten schools with seven different players appearing on watch lists, followed by six nominees from Illinois and Michigan and five selections for Michigan State and Wisconsin.

On the offensive side of the ball, returning first-team All-Big Ten quarterback Daryll Clark of Penn State appears on the watch lists for the Walter Camp Player of the Year, Manning, Maxwell, Davey O'Brien and Johnny Unitas Golden Arm Awards. Illinois signal caller Juice Williams, a second-team All-Big Ten choice last year, appears on four different lists for the Manning, Maxwell, Davey O'Brien and Johnny Unitas Golden Arm Awards. Illini wideout Arrelious Benn (Biletnikoff, Walter Camp Player of the Year, Maxwell) and Ohio State quarterback Terrelle Pryor (Manning, Maxwell, Davey O'Brien) appear on three different watch lists. Players appearing on two lists include Iowa offensive tackle Bryan Bulaga, Michigan running back Brandon Minor and offensive lineman David Molk, Michigan State center Joel Nitchman, Minnesota wideout Eric Decker and quarterback Adam Weber, Northwestern center Ben Burkett, Ohio State center Mike Brewster, Penn State running back Evan Royster and offensive lineman Stefan Wisniewski and the Wisconsin trio of running back John Clay, tight end Garrett Graham and center John Moffitt.

On the defensive side of the ball, four standouts appear on five different watch lists. Big Ten Preseason Defensive Player of the Year and returning first-team All-Big Ten linebacker Greg Jones of Michigan State has been named to the watch lists for the Bednarik, Butkus and Rotary Lombardi Awards and the Lott and Nagurski Trophies. Fellow linebacker Sean Lee of Penn State, who missed last season due to injury after earning second-team All-Big Ten accolades in 2007, appears on the same five watch lists as Jones. Defensive ends Brandon Graham of Michigan and Corey Wootton of Northwestern were both tabbed for the Bednarik, Ted Hendricks, Rotary Lombardi, Lott and Nagurski watch lists. Wootton was a first-team All-Big Ten choice last year while Graham was named to the second team. Two more Nittany Lion standouts were named to four watch lists in linebacker NaVorro Bowman (Bednarik, Butkus, Lombardi, Nagurski) and defensive tackle Jared Odrick (Bednarik, Lombardi, Nagurski, Outland). Other defensive standouts to appear on multiple lists include Illinois linebacker Martez Wilson, Indiana defensive end Jammie Kirlew, Iowa linebacker Pat Angerer and Ohio State safety Kurt Coleman."

=== Award watch lists ===
Award	School	Player
Chuck Bednarik Award (Top Defensive Player)	IND	Jammie Kirlew
Chuck Bednarik Award (Top Defensive Player)	IOWA	Pat Angerer
Chuck Bednarik Award (Top Defensive Player)	MICH	Brandon Graham
Chuck Bednarik Award (Top Defensive Player)	MSU	Greg Jones
Chuck Bednarik Award (Top Defensive Player)	NU	Corey Wootton
Chuck Bednarik Award (Top Defensive Player)	PSU	Sean Lee
Chuck Bednarik Award (Top Defensive Player)	PSU	Jared Odrick
Chuck Bednarik Award (Top Defensive Player)	PSU	NaVorro Bowman
Fred Biletnikoff Award (Best Wide Receiver)	ILL	Arrelious Benn
Fred Biletnikoff Award (Best Wide Receiver)	MINN	Eric Decker
Butkus Award (Best Linebacker)	ILL	Martez Wilson
Butkus Award (Best Linebacker)	MICH	Obi Ezeh
Butkus Award (Best Linebacker)	MSU	Greg Jones
Butkus Award (Best Linebacker)	PSU	Sean Lee
Butkus Award (Best Linebacker)	PSU	NaVorro Bowman
Butkus Award (Best Linebacker)	IOWA	Pat Angerer
Butkus Award (Best Linebacker)	IOWA	A.J. Edds
Walter Camp Award (Top College Player)	ILL	Arrelious Benn
Walter Camp Award (Top College Player)	PSU	Daryll Clark
Walter Camp Award (Top College Player)	PSU	Evan Royster
Lou Groza Award (Outstanding Place Kicker)	MSU	Brett Swenson
Lou Groza Award (Outstanding Place Kicker)	OSU	Aaron Pettrey
Lou Groza Award (Outstanding Place Kicker)	PUR	Carson Wiggs
Lou Groza Award (Outstanding Place Kicker)	WIS	Philip Welch
Ray Guy Award (Outstanding Punter)	IOWA	Ryan Donahue
Ray Guy Award (Outstanding Punter)	MICH	Zoltan Mesko
Ted Hendricks Award (Outstanding Defensive End)	ILL	Doug Pilcher
Ted Hendricks Award (Outstanding Defensive End)	IND	Jammie Kirlew
Ted Hendricks Award (Outstanding Defensive End)	IND	Greg Middleton
Ted Hendricks Award (Outstanding Defensive End)	MICH	Brandon Graham
Ted Hendricks Award (Outstanding Defensive End)	MSU	Trevor Anderson
Ted Hendricks Award (Outstanding Defensive End)	NU	Corey Wootton
Ted Hendricks Award (Outstanding Defensive End)	OSU	Lawrence Wilson
Lombardi Award (Outstanding Lineman)	ILL	Martez Wilson
Lombardi Award (Outstanding Lineman)	IND	Jammie Kirlew
Lombardi Award (Outstanding Lineman)	IOWA	Bryan Bulaga
Lombardi Award (Outstanding Lineman)	MICH	Brandon Graham
Lombardi Award (Outstanding Lineman)	MICH	David Molk
Lombardi Award (Outstanding Lineman)	MICH	Stephen Schilling
Lombardi Award (Outstanding Lineman)	MSU	Greg Jones
Lombardi Award (Outstanding Lineman)	MSU	Joel Nitchman
Lombardi Award (Outstanding Lineman)	NU	Ben Burkett
Lombardi Award (Outstanding Lineman)	NU	Corey Wootton
Lombardi Award (Outstanding Lineman)	OSU	Mike Brewster
Lombardi Award (Outstanding Lineman)	PSU	NaVorro Bowman
Lombardi Award (Outstanding Lineman)	PSU	Sean Lee
Lombardi Award (Outstanding Lineman)	PSU	Jared Odrick
Lombardi Award (Outstanding Lineman)	PSU	Stefen Wisniewski
Lombardi Award (Outstanding Lineman)	WIS	Gabe Carimi
Lombardi Award (Outstanding Lineman)	WIS	Garrett Graham
Lombardi Award (Outstanding Lineman)	WIS	John Moffitt
Lott Trophy (Defensive IMPACT Player of the Year)	IOWA	Pat Angerer
Lott Trophy (Defensive IMPACT Player of the Year)	MICH	Brandon Graham
Lott Trophy (Defensive IMPACT Player of the Year)	MSU	Greg Jones
Lott Trophy (Defensive IMPACT Player of the Year)	NU	Corey Wootton
Lott Trophy (Defensive IMPACT Player of the Year)	OSU	Kurt Coleman
Lott Trophy (Defensive IMPACT Player of the Year)	PSU	Sean Lee
John Mackey Award (Outstanding Tight End)	OSU	Jake Ballard
John Mackey Award (Outstanding Tight End)	MSU	Charlie Gantt
John Mackey Award (Outstanding Tight End)	WIS	Garrett Graham
John Mackey Award (Outstanding Tight End)	ILL	Michael Hoomanawanui
John Mackey Award (Outstanding Tight End)	IOWA	Tony Moeaki
John Mackey Award (Outstanding Tight End)	PSU	Andrew Quarless
Manning Award (Outstanding Quarterback)	ILL	Juice Williams
Manning Award (Outstanding Quarterback)	IOWA	Ricky Stanzi
Manning Award (Outstanding Quarterback)	MINN	Adam Weber
Manning Award (Outstanding Quarterback)	OSU	Terrelle Pryor
Manning Award (Outstanding Quarterback)	PSU	Daryll Clark
Maxwell Award (Top College Player)	ILL	Arrelious Benn
Maxwell Award (Top College Player)	ILL	Juice Williams
Maxwell Award (Top College Player)	MICH	Brandon Minor
Maxwell Award (Top College Player)	MINN	Eric Decker
Maxwell Award (Top College Player)	OSU	Terrelle Pryor
Maxwell Award (Top College Player)	PSU	Daryll Clark
Maxwell Award (Top College Player)	PSU	Evan Royster
Maxwell Award (Top College Player)	WIS	John Clay
Bronko Nagurski Trophy (Top Defensive Player)	OSU	Kurt Coleman
Bronko Nagurski Trophy (Top Defensive Player)	MICH	Brandon Graham
Bronko Nagurski Trophy (Top Defensive Player)	MSU	Greg Jones
Bronko Nagurski Trophy (Top Defensive Player)	NU	Corey Wootton
Bronko Nagurski Trophy (Top Defensive Player)	PSU	Sean Lee
Bronko Nagurski Trophy (Top Defensive Player)	PSU	Jared Odrick
Bronko Nagurski Trophy (Top Defensive Player)	PSU	NaVorro Bowman
Davey O'Brien Award (Outstanding Quarterback)	PSU	Daryll Clark
Davey O'Brien Award (Outstanding Quarterback)	OSU	Terrelle Pryor
Davey O'Brien Award (Outstanding Quarterback)	MINN	Adam Weber
Davey O'Brien Award (Outstanding Quarterback)	ILL	Juice Williams
Outland Trophy (Outstanding Interior Lineman)	ILL	Jon Asamoah
Outland Trophy (Outstanding Interior Lineman)	IOWA	Bryan Bulaga
Outland Trophy (Outstanding Interior Lineman)	PSU	Jared Odrick
Outland Trophy (Outstanding Interior Lineman)	PSU	Stefen Wisniewski
Dave Rimington Trophy (Outstanding Center)	MICH	David Molk
Dave Rimington Trophy (Outstanding Center)	MSU	Joel Nitchman
Dave Rimington Trophy (Outstanding Center)	OSU	Mike Brewster
Dave Rimington Trophy (Outstanding Center)	NU	Ben Burkett
Dave Rimington Trophy (Outstanding Center)	WIS	John Moffitt
Jim Thorpe Award (Outstanding Defensive Back)	OSU	Kurt Coleman
Jim Thorpe Award (Outstanding Defensive Back)	IOWA	Amari Spievey
Doak Walker Award (Outstanding Running Back)	OSU	Dan Herron
Doak Walker Award (Outstanding Running Back)	MICH	Brandon Minor
Doak Walker Award (Outstanding Running Back)	WIS	John Clay
Johnny Unitas Golden Arm Award (Top Senior Quarterback)	ILL	Juice Williams
Johnny Unitas Golden Arm Award (Top Senior Quarterback)	NU	Mike Kafka
Johnny Unitas Golden Arm Award (Top Senior Quarterback)	PSU	Daryll Clark

Lott Trophy, Bronko Nagurski Trophy, and Jim Thorpe Award watchlist candidate Kurt Coleman of Ohio State, was suspended by the Big Ten Conference for one game. The suspension was for a violation of the new 2009 NCAA football playing rule that required mandatory conference video review of an act where a player initiates helmet-to-helmet contact and targets a defenseless opponent. The incident occurred during the September 26 game against Illinois.

=== Midseason ===
Obi Ezeh, Jones and Lee were among the sixteen selected to the midseason Butkus watchlist and Clark was named as one of ten finalists for the Unitas award. Eight Big Ten athletes were named as semifinalists for the Campbell Trophy: Illinois' Jon Asamoah, Indiana's Jammie Kirlew, Michigan's Zoltan Mesko, Minnesota's Eric Decker, Northwestern's Andrew Brewer, Ohio State's Jim Cordle, Penn State's Josh Hull and Wisconsin's Mickey Turner on October 1. Four Big Ten Players midseason watch list for the John Mackey Award: Moeaki, Gantt, Quarless and Graham. Three were quarterfinalists for the Lott Award: Angerer, Jones and Coleman. The Big Ten had two O'Brien Award semifinalists: Stanzi and Clark. Eric Decker was named one of 10 semifinalists for the Biletnikoff Award. Jones has been selected as a semifinalists for the Bednarik Award along with Angerer, Bowman and Wisconsin defensive end O'Brien Schofield. Hawkeyes' Tyler Sash was chosen as a semifinalist for the Jim Thorpe Award. Swenson and Northwestern's Stefan Demos were named semifinalists for the Groza Award. Mesko, Blair White, and Andrew Brewer were among the 12 finalists for the Wuerffel Trophy. Mesko, and Donahue were among 10 semifinalists for the Guy Award. Mesko was named one of three finalists for the Ray Guy Award. Michigan's Graham was a finalist for the Henricks Award.

== Rankings ==
Unlike most sports, college football's governing body, the NCAA, does not bestow a National Championship title. That title is bestowed by one or more of four different polling agencies. There are two main weekly polls that begin in the preseason: the AP Poll and the Coaches Poll. Two additional polls are released midway through the season; the Harris Interactive Poll is released after the fourth week of the season and the Bowl Championship Series (BCS) Standings is released after the seventh week. The Harris Poll and Coaches Poll are factors in the BCS Standings.

Legend
	Improvement in ranking
	Drop in ranking
	Not ranked previous week
RV	Received votes but were not ranked in Top 25 of poll

		Pre	Wk 1	Wk 2	Wk 3	Wk 4	Wk 5	Wk 6	Wk 7	Wk 8	Wk 9	Wk 10	Wk 11	Wk 12	Wk 13	Wk 14	Final
Illinois	AP	RV															
Illinois	C	RV															
Illinois	BCS	Not released															
Indiana	AP																
Indiana	C																
Indiana	BCS	Not released															
Iowa	AP	22	RV	RV	RV	13	12	11	7	7	8	15	15	13	9	10	7
Iowa	C	21	RV	RV	RV	17	14	12	8	8	6	13	15	13	10	11	7
Iowa	BCS	Not released							6	4	4	10	13	11	9	10	
Michigan	AP		RV	25	23	22	RV	RV	RV								
Michigan	C	RV	RV	RV	22	20	RV	RV	RV								
Michigan	BCS	Not released															
Michigan State	AP	RV	RV														
Michigan State	C	RV	RV						RV								
Michigan State	BCS	Not released															
Minnesota	AP			RV													
Minnesota	C	RV	RV	RV	RV	RV											
Minnesota	BCS	Not released															
Northwestern	AP	RV												RV	RV	RV	
Northwestern	C	RV	RV	RV									RV	RV	RV	RV	RV
Northwestern	BCS	Not released															
Ohio State	AP	6	8	11	13	9	9	7	18	17	15	10	9	9	8	8	5
Ohio State	C	6	7	11	11	9	8	7	17	15	12	8	8	8	7	8	5
Ohio State	BCS	Not released							19	17	16	11	10	10	8	8	
Penn State	AP	8	7	5	5	15	14	14	13	12	11	19	13	12	10	11	9
Penn State	C	9	5	5	4	13	12	13	11	10	10	17	12	11	9	13	8
Penn State	BCS	Not released							13	12	11	18	14	13	11	13	
Purdue	AP																
Purdue	C																
Purdue	BCS	Not released															
Wisconsin	AP					RV	RV	RV	RV	RV	24	21	17	RV	RV	24	16
Wisconsin	C	RV			RV	RV	25	RV	RV	RV	22	20	14	RV	RV	22	16
Wisconsin	BCS	Not released							21		21	20	16			25	

== Spring games ==
April 11

- Michigan

April 18

- Indiana
- Purdue
- Wisconsin

April 25

- Illinois
- Michigan State
- Minnesota
- Northwestern
- Ohio State
- Penn State

Did not have spring game this year

- Iowa

== Season ==
Purdue head coach Danny Hope began his first season in West Lafayette. On September 12, Minnesota opened the 2009 season its new 50,720-seat home field, TCF Bank Stadium when the team hosted the Air Force Falcons. For the third straight year, each Big Ten home game during the first three weeks of the season was broadcast nationally on ABC, ESPN, ESPN2 or the Big Ten Network, which televised more than 20 contests altogether in the opening weeks, including all nine home games in Week 1. Every ABC afternoon telecast was broadcast nationally, either on ABC or simultaneously on ESPN or ESPN2. Note that although the Big Ten is a regional conference the Big Ten Network, which was available in 19 of the 20 largest U.S. media markets, was available to approximately 73 million homes in the U.S. and Canada through agreements with more than 250 cable television or satellite television affiliates.

The season began amidst allegations that Michigan was working its players beyond the extent permissible by the NCAA. Nonetheless, the conference had its fifth ten-win week during the opening weekend. During week 3, the Ohio State-USC game became the most-viewed college football game in ESPN history. After three weeks, the Big Ten Conference was the only Football Bowl Subdivision conference with five 3–0 teams.

=== Homecoming games ===
September 26

- Michigan 36, Indiana 33 (Michigan's record in homecoming games is 83–26)†

October 3

- Northwestern 27, Purdue 21 (Purdue's record in homecoming games is 48–35–4)†

October 10

- Michigan State 24, Illinois 14 (Illinois's record in homecoming games is 42–55–2)†
- Iowa 30, Michigan 28 (Iowa's record in homecoming games is 52–41–5)†
- Minnesota 35, Purdue 20 (Minnesota's record in homecoming games is 54–33–3)†

October 17

- Indiana 27, Illinois 14 (Indiana's record in homecoming games is 43–48–6)†
- Michigan State 24, Northwestern 14 (Michigan State's record in homecoming games is 61–30–3)†
- Penn State 20, Minnesota 0 (Penn State's record in homecoming games is 65–20–5)†
- Iowa 20, Wisconsin 10 (Wisconsin's record in homecoming games is 52–45–5)†

October 24

- Northwestern 29, Indiana 28 11:00 a.m. CT
- Ohio State 38, Minnesota 7 (Ohio State's record in homecoming games is 64–19–5)†

† denotes record after the game

== Schedule ==
Index to colors and formatting
Big 10 member won
Big 10 member lost
Big 10 teams in **bold**

=== Week one ===
Date	Time	Visiting team	Home team	Site	TV	Result	Attendance	Ref.
September 3	8:00 p.m.	Eastern Kentucky	**Indiana**	Memorial Stadium • Bloomington, IN	Big Ten Network	**W** 19–13	36,759	
September 5	12:00 p.m.	Towson	**Northwestern**	Ryan Field • Evanston, IL	Big Ten Network	**W** 47–14	17,587	
September 5	12:00 p.m.	Montana State	**Michigan State**	Spartan Stadium • Lansing, MI	Big Ten Network	**W** 44–3	74,518	
September 5	12:00 p.m.	**Minnesota**	Syracuse	Carrier Dome • Syracuse, NY	ESPN2	**W** 23–20	74,518	
September 5	12:00 p.m.	Navy	**Ohio State**	Ohio Stadium • Columbus, OH	ESPN	**W** 31–27	105,092	
September 5	12:00 p.m.	Akron	**Penn State**	Beaver Stadium • University Park, PA	Big Ten Network	**W** 31–7	104,968	
September 5	12:00 p.m.	Toledo	**Purdue**	Ross–Ade Stadium • West Lafayette, IN	Big Ten Network	**W** 52–31	47,551	
September 5	12:05 p.m.	Northern Iowa	**Iowa**	Kinnick Stadium • Iowa City, IA	Big Ten Network	**W** 17–16	70,585	
September 5	3:30 p.m.	Western Michigan	**Michigan**	Michigan Stadium • Ann Arbor, MI	ABC	**W** 31–7	109,019	
September 5	3:40 p.m.	**Missouri**	Illinois	Edward Jones Dome • St. Louis, MO	ESPN	**L** 37–9	64,215	
September 5	7:00 p.m.	Northern Illinois	**Wisconsin**	Camp Randall Stadium • Madison, WI	Big Ten Network	**W** 28–20	80,532	
^{#}Rankings from AP Poll released prior to game. All times are in Eastern Time.

=== Week two ===
Date	Time	Visiting team	Home team	Site	TV	Result	Attendance	Ref.
September 12	12:00 p.m.	Eastern Michigan	**Northwestern**	Ryan Field • Evanston, IL	Big Ten Network	**W** 27–24	19,239	
September 12	12:00 p.m.	Western Michigan	**Indiana**	Memorial Stadium • Bloomington, IN	Big Ten Network	**W** 23–19	35,162	
September 12	12:00 p.m.	Central Michigan	**Michigan State**	Spartan Stadium • East Lansing, MI	ESPN2	**L** 29–27	76,221	
September 12	12:00 p.m.	Syracuse	**Penn State**	Beaver Stadium • University Park, PA	Big Ten Network	**W** 28–7	106,387	
September 12	12:00 p.m.	Fresno State	**Wisconsin**	Camp Randall Stadium • Madison, WI	ESPN	**W** 34–31	80,353	
September 12	12:05 p.m.	**Iowa**	Iowa State	Jack Trice Stadium • Ames, IA	Fox Sports Net	**W** 35–3	52,089	
September 12	3:30 p.m.	Notre Dame	**Michigan**	Michigan Stadium • Ann Arbor, MI	ABC	**W** 38–34	110,278	
September 12	7:00 p.m.	Air Force	**Minnesota**	TCF Bank Stadium • Minneapolis, MN	Big Ten Network	**W** 20–13	50,805	
September 12	7:00 p.m.	Illinois State	**Illinois**	Memorial Stadium • Champaign, IL	Big Ten Network	**W** 45–17	62,347	
September 12	8:00 p.m.	USC	**Ohio State**	Ohio Stadium • Columbus, OH	ESPN	**L** 18–15	106,033	
September 12	10:15 p.m.	**Purdue**	Oregon	Autzen Stadium • Eugene, OR	Fox Sports Net	**L** 38–36	57,772	
^{#}Rankings from AP Poll released prior to game. All times are in Eastern Time.

=== Week three ===
Date	Time	Visiting team	Home team	Site	TV	Result	Attendance	Ref.
September 19	12:00 p.m. ET	Eastern Michigan Eagles	**Michigan Wolverines**	Michigan Stadium • Ann Arbor, Michigan	Big Ten Network	**W** 45–17	107,903	
September 19	12:00 p.m. ET	California Golden Bears	**Minnesota Golden Gophers**	TCF Bank Stadium • Minneapolis, Minnesota	ESPN	**L** 35–21	50,805	
September 19	12:00 p.m. ET	Temple Owls	**Penn State Nittany Lions**	Beaver Stadium • University Park, Pennsylvania	Big Ten Network	**W** 31–6	105,514	
September 19	12:00 p.m. ET	Wofford Terriers	**Wisconsin Badgers**	Camp Randall Stadium • Madison, Wisconsin	Big Ten Network	**W** 44–14	78,253	
September 19	12:00 p.m. ET	Northern Illinois Huskies	**Purdue Boilermakers**	Ross–Ade Stadium • West Lafayette, Indiana	Big Ten Network	**L** 28–21	53,240	
September 19	12:00 p.m. ET	**Ohio State Buckeyes**	Toledo Rockets	Cleveland Browns Stadium • Cleveland, Ohio		**W** 38–0	71,727	
September 19	3:30 p.m. ET	**Michigan State Spartans**	Notre Dame Fighting Irish	Notre Dame Stadium • Notre Dame, Indiana	NBC	**L** 33–30	80,795	
September 19	3:30 p.m. ET	**Indiana Hoosiers**	Akron Zips	InfoCision Stadium • Akron, Ohio	ESPNU	**W** 38–21	18,340	
September 19	3:35 p.m. ET	Arizona Wildcats	**Iowa Hawkeyes**	Kinnick Stadium • Iowa City, Iowa	ABC	**W** 27–17	70,585	
September 19	7:00 p.m. ET	**Northwestern Wildcats**	Syracuse Orange	Carrier Dome • Syracuse, New York		**L** 37–34	40,251	

=== Week four ===
Date	Time	Visiting team	Home team	Site	TV	Result	Attendance	Ref.
September 26	12:00 p.m. ET	**Minnesota Golden Gophers**	Northwestern Wildcats	Ryan Field • Evanston, Illinois	Big Ten Network	**MINN** 35–24	22,091	
September 26	12:00 p.m. ET	**Indiana Hoosiers**	Michigan Wolverines	Michigan Stadium • Ann Arbor, Michigan	ESPN2	**MICH** 36–33	108,118	
September 26	12:00 p.m. ET	**Michigan State Spartans**	Wisconsin Badgers	Camp Randall Stadium • Madison, Wisconsin	ESPN	**WIS** 38–30	80,123	
September 26	3:30 p.m. ET	**Illinois Fighting Illini**	Ohio State Buckeyes	Ohio Stadium • Columbus, Ohio	ABC	**OSU** 30–0	105,219	
September 26	8:00 p.m. ET	**Iowa Hawkeyes**	Penn State Nittany Lions	Beaver Stadium • University Park, Pennsylvania	ABC	**IOWA** 21–10	109,316	
September 26	8:00 p.m. ET	Notre Dame Fighting Irish	Purdue Boilermakers	Ross–Ade Stadium • West Lafayette, Indiana	ESPN	**L** 24–21	56,452	

=== Week five ===
Date	Time	Visiting team	Home team	Site	TV	Result	Attendance	Ref.
October 3	12:00 p.m. ET	**Michigan Wolverines**	Michigan State Spartans	Spartan Stadium • East Lansing, Michigan	Big Ten Network	**MSU** 26–20	78,629	
October 3	12:00 p.m. ET	**Wisconsin Badgers**	Minnesota Golden Gophers	TCF Bank Stadium • Minneapolis, Minnesota	ESPN	**WIS** 31–28	50,805	
October 3	12:00 p.m. ET	**Northwestern Wildcats**	Purdue Boilermakers	Ross–Ade Stadium • West Lafayette, Indiana	Big Ten Network	**NU** 27–21	47,163	
October 3	12:05 p.m. ET	Arkansas State Red Wolves	Iowa Hawkeyes	Kinnick Stadium • Iowa City, Iowa	ESPN2	**W** 24–21	67,989	
October 3	3:30 p.m. ET	**Penn State Nittany Lions**	Illinois Fighting Illini	Memorial Stadium • Champaign, Illinois	ABC	**PSU** 35–17	62,870	
October 3	7:00 p.m. ET	**Ohio State Buckeyes**	Indiana Hoosiers	Memorial Stadium • Bloomington, Indiana	Big Ten Network	**OSU** 33–14	51,500	

=== Week six ===
Date	Time	Visiting team	Home team	Site	TV	Result	Attendance	Ref.
October 10	12:00 p.m. ET	Miami RedHawks	**Northwestern Wildcats**	Ryan Field • Evanston, Illinois	Big Ten Network	**W** 16–6	23,085	
October 10	12:00 p.m. ET	**Purdue Boilermakers**	**Minnesota Golden Gophers**	TCF Bank Stadium • Minneapolis, Minnesota	ESPN2	**MINN** 35–20	50,805	
October 10	12:00 p.m. ET	Eastern Illinois Panthers	**Penn State Nittany Lions**	Beaver Stadium • University Park, Pennsylvania	ESPN Classic	**PSU** 52–3	104,488	
October 10	12:00 p.m. ET	**Michigan State Spartans**	**Illinois Fighting Illini**	Memorial Stadium • Champaign, Illinois	Big Ten Network	**MSU** 24–14	62,870	
October 10	3:30 p.m. ET	**Wisconsin Badgers**	**Ohio State Buckeyes**	Ohio Stadium • Columbus, Ohio	ABC	**OSU** 31–13	105,301	
October 10	3:30 p.m. ET	**Indiana Hoosiers**	Virginia Cavaliers	Scott Stadium • Charlottesville, Virginia		**L** 47–7	45,371	
October 10	8:05 p.m. ET	**Michigan Wolverines**	**Iowa Hawkeyes**	Kinnick Stadium • Iowa City, Iowa	ABC	**IOWA** 30–28	70,585	

=== Week seven ===
Date	Time	Visiting team	Home team	Site	TV	Result	Attendance	Ref.
October 17	12:00 p.m. ET	**Northwestern Wildcats**	Michigan State Spartans	Spartan Stadium • East Lansing, Michigan	ESPN2	**MSU** 24–14	71,726	
October 17	12:00 p.m. ET	Delaware State Hornets	Michigan Wolverines	Michigan Stadium • Ann Arbor, Michigan	Big Ten Network	**W** 63–6	106,304	
October 17	12:00 p.m. ET	**Iowa Hawkeyes**	Wisconsin Badgers	Camp Randall Stadium • Madison, Wisconsin	ESPN	**IOWA** 20–10	81,043	
October 17	12:00 p.m. ET	**Ohio State Buckeyes**	Purdue Boilermakers	Ross–Ade Stadium • West Lafayette, Indiana	Big Ten Network	**PUR** 26–18	50,404	
October 17	3:30 p.m. ET	**Minnesota Golden Gophers**	Penn State Nittany Lions	Beaver Stadium • University Park, Pennsylvania	ABC	**PSU** 20–0	107,981	
October 17	7:00 p.m. ET	**Illinois Fighting Illini**	Indiana Hoosiers	Memorial Stadium • Bloomington, Indiana	Big Ten Network	**IND** 27–14	42,358	

=== Week eight ===
Date	Time	Visiting team	Home team	Site	TV	Result	Attendance	Ref.
October 24	12:00 p.m. ET	**Indiana Hoosiers**	**Northwestern Wildcats**	Ryan Field • Evanston, Illinois	Big Ten Network	**NU** 29–28	24,364	
October 24	12:00 p.m. ET	**Minnesota Golden Gophers**	**Ohio State Buckeyes**	Ohio Stadium • Columbus, Ohio	ESPN	**OSU** 38–7	105,011	
October 24	12:00 p.m. ET	**Illinois Fighting Illini**	**Purdue Boilermakers**	Ross–Ade Stadium • West Lafayette, Indiana	ESPN2	**PUR** 24–14	47,349	
October 24	3:30 p.m. ET	**Penn State Nittany Lions**	**Michigan Wolverines**	Michigan Stadium • Ann Arbor, Michigan	ABC	**PSU** 35–10	110,377	
October 24	7:00 p.m. ET	**Iowa Hawkeyes**	**Michigan State Spartans**	Spartan Stadium • East Lansing, Michigan	Big Ten Network	**IOWA** 15–13	74,411	

=== Week nine ===
Date	Time	Visiting team	Home team	Site	TV	Result	Attendance	Ref.
October 31	12:00 p.m. ET	New Mexico State Aggies	Ohio State Buckeyes	Ohio Stadium • Columbus, Ohio	Big Ten Network	**W** 45–0	104,719	
October 31	12:00 p.m. ET	**Indiana Hoosiers**	Iowa Hawkeyes	Kinnick Stadium • Iowa City, Iowa	ESPN	**IOWA** 42–24	70,585	
October 31	12:00 p.m. ET	**Purdue Boilermakers**	Wisconsin Badgers	Camp Randall Stadium • Madison, Wisconsin	ESPN2	**WIS** 37–0	79,920	
October 31	3:30 p.m. ET	**Michigan Wolverines**	Illinois Fighting Illini	Memorial Stadium • Champaign, Illinois	ABC	**ILL** 38–13	60,119	
October 31	4:30 p.m. ET	**Penn State Nittany Lions**	Northwestern Wildcats	Ryan Field • Evanston, Illinois	ESPN	**PSU** 34–13	30,546	
October 31	8:00 p.m. ET	**Michigan State Spartans**	Minnesota Golden Gophers	TCF Bank Stadium • Minneapolis, Minnesota	Big Ten Network	**MINN** 42–34	50,805	

=== Week ten ===
Date	Time	Visiting team	Home team	Site	TV	Result	Attendance	Ref.
November 7	12:00 p.m. ET	**Wisconsin Badgers**	Indiana Hoosiers	Memorial Stadium • Bloomington, Indiana	Big Ten Network	**WIS** 31–28	36,611	
November 7	12:00 p.m. ET	Western Michigan Broncos	Michigan State Spartans	Spartan Stadium • East Lansing, Michigan	Big Ten Network	**W** 49–14	73,910	
November 7	12:00 p.m. ET	**Purdue Boilermakers**	Michigan Wolverines	Michigan Stadium • Ann Arbor, Michigan	Big Ten Network	**PUR** 38–36	108,543	
November 7	12:00 p.m. ET	**Illinois Fighting Illini**	Minnesota Golden Gophers	TCF Bank Stadium • Minneapolis, Minnesota	Big Ten Network	**ILL** 35–32	50,805	
November 7	12:00 p.m. ET	**Northwestern Wildcats**	Iowa Hawkeyes	Kinnick Stadium • Iowa City, Iowa	ESPN	**NW** 17–10	70,585	
November 7	3:30 p.m. ET	**Ohio State Buckeyes**	Penn State Nittany Lions	Beaver Stadium • University Park, Pennsylvania	ABC	**OSU** 24–7	110,033	

=== Week eleven ===
Date	Time	Visiting team	Home team	Site	TV	Result	Attendance	Ref.
November 14	12:00 p.m. ET	South Dakota State Jackrabbits	Minnesota Golden Gophers	TCF Bank Stadium • Minneapolis, Minnesota	Big Ten Network	**W** 16–13	50,805	
November 14	12:00 p.m. ET	**Indiana Hoosiers**	Penn State Nittany Lions	Beaver Stadium • University Park, Pennsylvania	Big Ten Network	**PSU** 31–20	107,379	
November 14	12:00 p.m. ET	**Michigan Wolverines**	Wisconsin Badgers	Camp Randall Stadium • Madison, Wisconsin	Big Ten Network	**WIS** 45–24	80,540	
November 14	12:00 p.m. ET	**Northwestern Wildcats**	Illinois Fighting Illini	Memorial Stadium • Champaign, Illinois	ESPN Classic	**NU** 21–16	60,523	
November 14	12:00 p.m. ET	**Michigan State Spartans**	Purdue Boilermakers	Ross–Ade Stadium • West Lafayette, Indiana	ESPN	**MSU** 40–37	48,408	
November 14	3:30 p.m. ET	**Iowa Hawkeyes**	Ohio State Buckeyes	Ohio Stadium • Columbus, Ohio	ABC	**OSU** 27–24	105,455	

=== Week twelve ===
Date	Time	Visiting team	Home team	Site	TV	Result	Attendance	Ref.
November 21	3:30 p.m. ET	**Wisconsin Badgers**	**Northwestern Wildcats**	Ryan Field • Evanston, Illinois	Big Ten Network	**NU** 33–31	32,150	
November 21	3:30 p.m. ET	**Purdue Boilermakers**	**Indiana Hoosiers**	Memorial Stadium • Bloomington, Indiana	Big Ten Network	**PUR** 38–21	48,607	
November 21	3:30 p.m. ET	**Penn State Nittany Lions**	**Michigan State Spartans**	Spartan Stadium • East Lansing, Michigan	ABC	**PSU** 42–14	73,771	
November 21	12:00 p.m. ET	**Ohio State Buckeyes**	**Michigan Wolverines**	Michigan Stadium • Ann Arbor, Michigan	ABC	**OSU** 21–10	110,922	
November 21	12:00 p.m. ET	**Minnesota Golden Gophers**	**Iowa Hawkeyes**	Kinnick Stadium • Iowa City, Iowa	ESPN	**IOWA** 12–0	70,585	

=== Week thirteen ===
Date	Time	Visiting team	Home team	Site	TV	Result	Attendance	Ref.
November 27	12:00 p.m. ET	**Illinois Fighting Illini**	Cincinnati Bearcats	Nippert Stadium • Cincinnati, Ohio	ABC	**L** 49–36	35,106	

=== Week fourteen ===
Date	Time	Visiting team	Home team	Site	TV	Result	Attendance	Ref.
December 5	11:30 p.m. ET	**Wisconsin Badgers**	Hawaii Warriors	Aloha Stadium • Honolulu, Hawaii	ESPN2	**W** 55–10	40,069	
December 5	12:30 p.m. ET	Fresno State Bulldogs	**Illinois Fighting Illini**	Memorial Stadium • Champaign, Illinois	Big Ten Network	**L** 53–52	48,538	

== Records against other conferences ==
The following summarizes the Big Ten's record this season vs. other conferences.

Conference	Wins	Losses
ACC	2	1
Big 12	1	3
Big East	2	2
Big Sky	1	0
Colonial Athletic	1	0
MEAC	1	0
Independents	2	2
MAC	12	2
Missouri Valley	3	0
Mountain West	1	0
Ohio Valley	2	0
Pac-10	2	3
SEC	1	1
Southern	1	0
Sun Belt	1	0
WAC	3	1
**Overall**	36	15

=== Big Ten vs. BCS matchups ===
During the season, Big Ten teams played several games against BCS conference opponents. Some of these games are regularly contested rivalry games.

Date	Visitor	Home	Significance	Winning team
September 5	Missouri	Illinois	Arch Rivalry	Missouri
September 5	Minnesota	Syracuse		**Minnesota**
September 12	Iowa	Iowa State	Cy-Hawk Trophy	**Iowa**
September 12	Notre Dame	Michigan	Michigan – Notre Dame rivalry	**Michigan**
September 12	USC	Ohio State	Both ranked in the top 10	USC
September 12	Syracuse	Penn State		**Penn State**
September 12	Purdue	Oregon		Oregon
September 19	Arizona	Iowa		**Iowa**
September 19	Michigan State	Notre Dame	Megaphone Trophy	Notre Dame
September 19	Cal	Minnesota		Cal
September 19	Northwestern	Syracuse		Syracuse
September 26	Notre Dame	Purdue	Shillelagh Trophy	Notre Dame
October 10	Indiana	Virginia		Virginia
November 27	Illinois	Cincinnati		Cincinnati

=== Bowl games ===
On December 6, the Bowl matchups were announced. It marked the fifth consecutive season that at least seven Big Ten teams earned bowl game invitations and the ninth time in twelve-year history of the Bowl Championship Series that the conference was awarded two BCS invitations.

Bowl Game	Date	Stadium	City	Television	Matchups/Result	Payout (US$)
Champs Sports Bowl	December 29, 2009 8:00 p.m. ET	Citrus Bowl	Orlando, Florida	ESPN	**Wisconsin 20**, Miami 14	$2,130,000
Insight Bowl	December 31, 2009 6:00 p.m. ET	Sun Devil Stadium	Tempe, Arizona	NFL Network	Iowa State 14, **Minnesota 13**	$1,200,000
Outback Bowl	January 1, 2010 11:00 a.m. ET	Raymond James Stadium	Tampa, Florida	ESPN	Auburn 38, **Northwestern 35** (OT)	$3,100,000
Capital One	January 1, 2010 1:00 p.m. ET	Citrus Bowl	Orlando, Florida	ABC	**Penn State 19**, LSU 17	$4,250,000
Rose Bowl*	January 1, 2010 5:10 p.m. ET	Rose Bowl	Pasadena, California	ABC	**Ohio State 26**, Oregon 17	$17,000,000
Alamo Bowl	January 2, 2010 9:00 p.m. ET	Alamodome	San Antonio, Texas	ESPN	Texas Tech 41, **Michigan State 31**	$2,250,000
Orange Bowl*	January 5, 2010 8:00 p.m. ET	Land Shark Stadium	Miami Gardens, Florida	FOX	**Iowa 24** vs. Georgia Tech 14	$17,000,000

(*) denotes BCS game
Big Ten team and score in bold
Winning team and score listed first in italics

== Players of the week ==
Throughout the conference regular season, the Big Ten offices named offensive, defensive and special teams players of the week each Sunday.

Week	Offensive		Defensive		Special teams	
Week	Player	Team	Player	Team	Player	Team
9/6/09	Daryll Clark; Ralph Bolden	PSU; PUR	Lee Campbell	MINN	Jeremiha Hunter; Eric Ellestad	IOWA; MINN
9/13/09	Tate Forcier	MICH	Tyler Sash; Nate Triplett	IOWA; MINN	Darryl Stonum	MICH
9/20/09	Carlos Brown; Mike Kafka	MICH; NU	Sean Lee	PSU	Ryan Donahue; Chris Borland	IOWA; WIS
9/27/09	Scott Tolzien	WIS	Pat Angerer	IOWA	Adrian Clayborn	IOWA
10/4/09	John Clay	WIS	O'Brien Schofield	WIS	Stefan Demos; Jeremy Boone	NU; PSU
10/11/09	Tony Moeaki	IOWA	Ross Homan	OSU	Zoltan Mesko	MICH
10/18/09	Ben Chappell; Blair White	IND; MSU	Ryan Kerrigan	PUR	Carson Wiggs	PUR
10/25/09	Daryll Clark (2)	PSU	Adrian Clayborn	IOWA	Thaddeus Gibson; Stefan Demos (2)	OSU; NU
11/1/09	Adam Weber	MINN	Garrett Brown; Chris Borland	MINN; WIS	Keshawn Martin	MSU
11/8/09	Joey Elliott	PUR	Cameron Heyward	OSU	Ray Small	OSU
11/15/09	Scott Tolzien (2)	WIS	NaVorro Bowman	PSU	Brett Swenson	MSU
11/22/09	Mike Kafka (2); Daryll Clark (3)	NU; PSU	Troy Johnson; NaVorro Bowman (2)	IOWA; PSU	Stefan Demos (3)	NU
11/29/09	Juice Williams	ILL	--	--	Derek Dimke	ILL
12/06/09	Mikel Leshoure; John Clay (2)	ILL; WIS	J. J. Watt	WIS	David Gilreath	WIS

== Big Ten Conference football individual honors ==
2009 co-MVPs

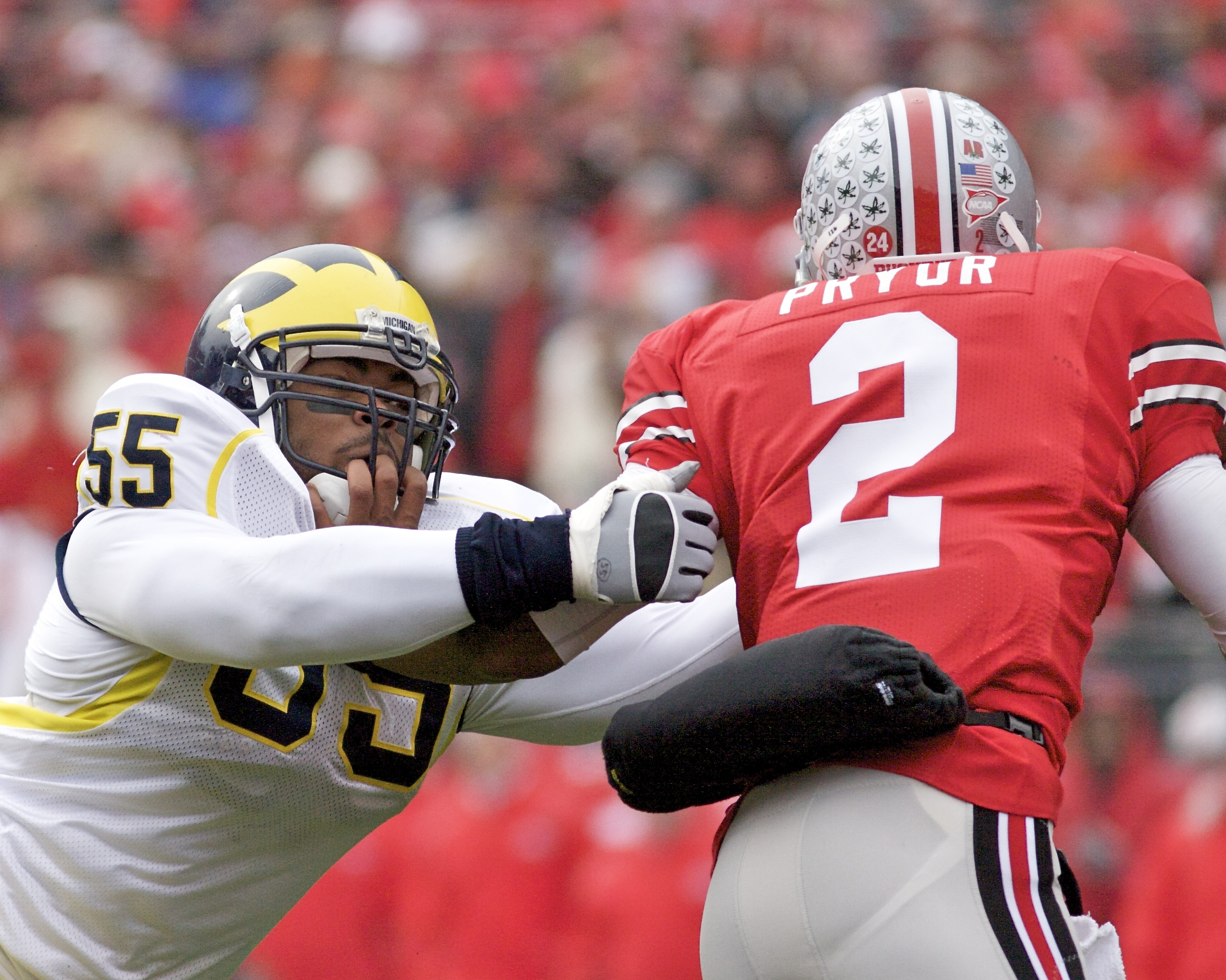
Brandon Graham attempting to sack Terrelle Pryor in 2008

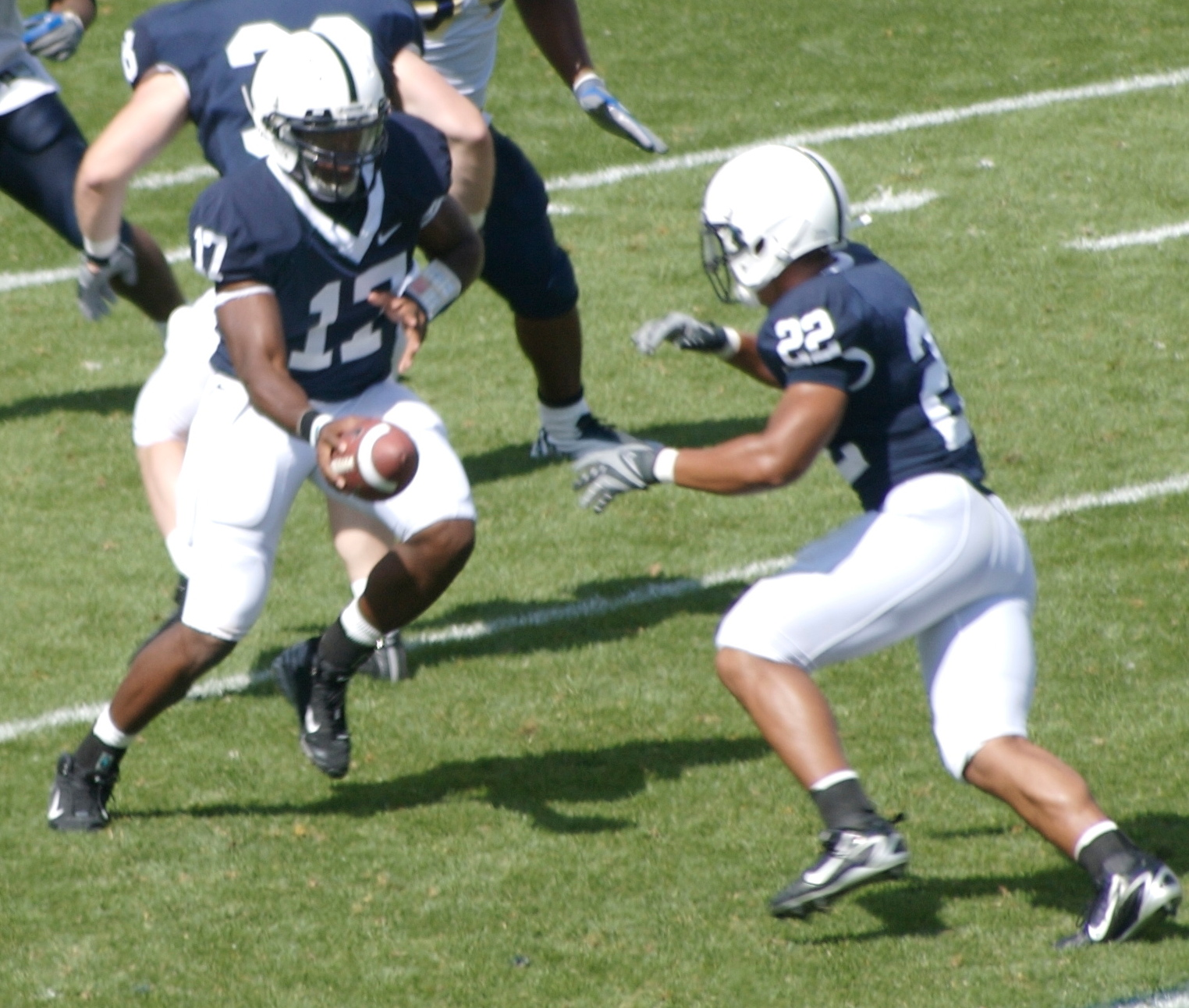
Daryll Clark handing off to Evan Royster in 2007

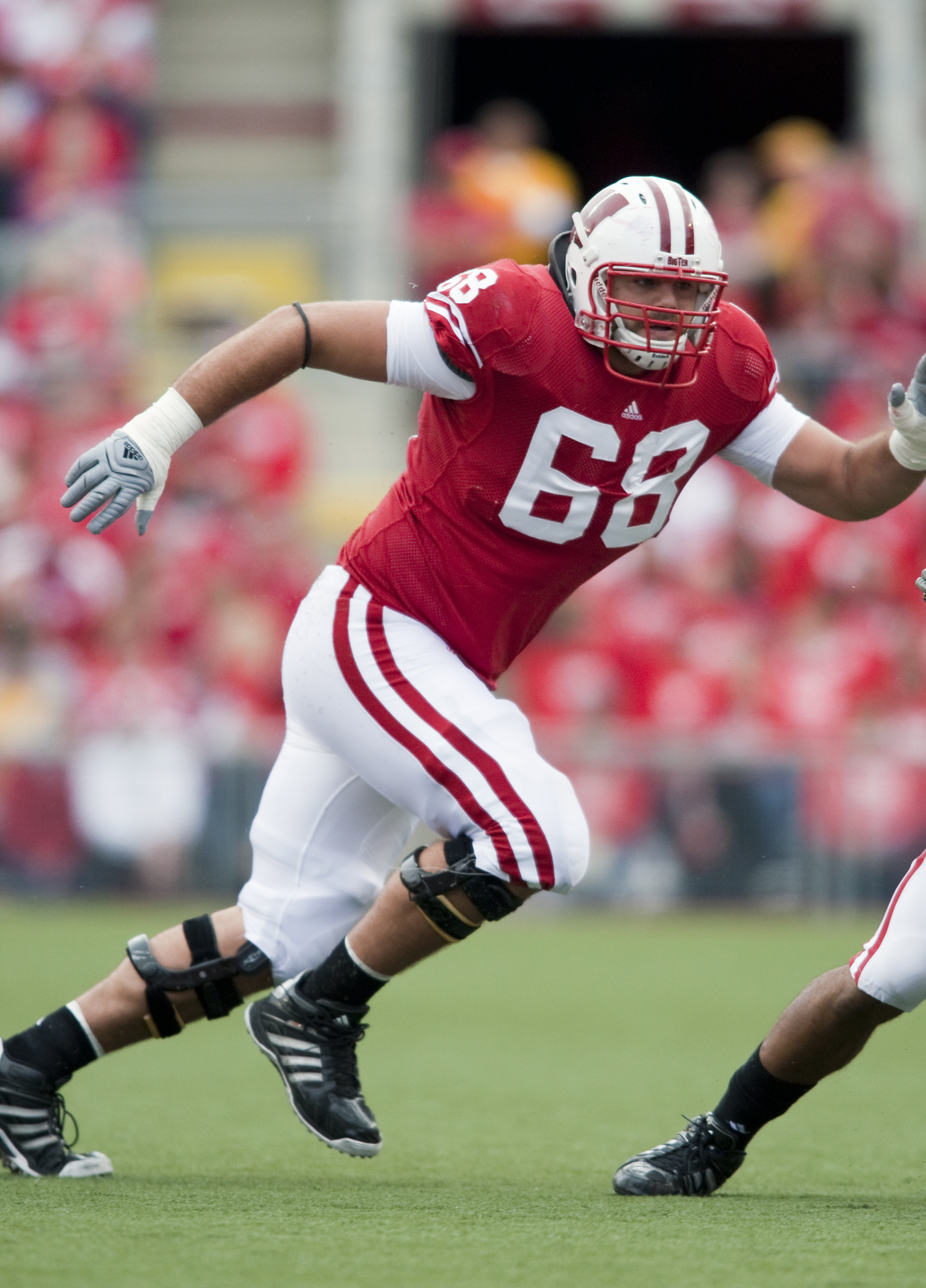
Tackle Gabe Carimi

At the conclusion of week 12, the coaches and media made Big Ten Conference football individual honors selections. John Clay was selected as offensive player of the year by both the coaches and the media. Jared Odrick and Greg Jones won defensive player of the year awards from the coaches and media, respectively. Bryan Bulaga and Odrick were selected as offensive and defensive linemen of the year. Chris Borland was freshman of the year and Kirk Ferentz was Coach of the Year. The Chicago Tribune Silver Football recipients as the Big Ten co-MVPs were Daryll Clark and Brandon Graham, marking the first time the award has been shared.

=== All-Conference ===
The following players were selected as All-Big Ten at the conclusion of the season.

	Coaches				Media
OFFENSE	FIRST TEAM		SECOND TEAM		FIRST TEAM		SECOND TEAM
Quarterback	Daryll Clark	PSU	Mike Kafka	NU	Daryll Clark	PSU	Mike Kafka	NU
Running Back	Evan Royster	PSU	Brandon Saine	OSU	Evan Royster	PSU	Brandon Saine	OSU
Running Back	John Clay	WIS	Ralph Bolden	PUR	John Clay	WIS	Ralph Bolden	PUR
Receiver	Eric Decker	MINN	Tandon Doss*	IND	Tandon Doss	IND	Blair White	MSU
Receiver	Blair White	MSU	Derrell Johnson-Koulianos*	IOWA	Keith Smith	PUR	Zeke Markshausen	NU
			Keith Smith*	PUR
Center	Stefen Wisniewski	PSU	Rafael Eubanks*	IOWA	Stefen Wisniewski	PSU	Rafael Eubanks	IOWA
			Joel Nitchman*	MSU
Guard	Dace Richardson	IOWA	Jon Asamoah	ILL	Justin Boren	OSU	Jon Asamoah	ILL
Guard	John Moffitt	WIS	Justin Boren	OSU	John Moffitt	WIS	Dace Richardson	IOWA
Tackle	Bryan Bulaga	IOWA	Rodger Saffold	IND	Bryan Bulaga	IOWA	Kyle Calloway	IOWA
Tackle	Dennis Landolt	PSU	Gabe Carimi	WIS	Gabe Carimi	WIS	Dennis Landolt	PSU
Tight End	Tony Moeaki	IOWA	Garrett Graham	WIS	Garrett Graham	WIS	Tony Moeaki	IOWA
Kicker	Brett Swenson	MSU	Stefan Demos	NU	Brett Swenson	MSU	Stefan Demos	NU
DEFENSE	FIRST TEAM		SECOND TEAM		FIRST TEAM		SECOND TEAM
Line	Adrian Clayborn	IOWA	Jammie Kirlew		Adrian Clayborn	IOWA	Jammie Kirlew	IND
Line	Brandon Graham	MICH	Thaddeus Gibson	OSU	Brandon Graham	MICH	Thaddeus Gibson	OSU
Line	Jared Odrick	PSU	Cameron Heyward	OSU	Ryan Kerrigan	PUR	Cameron Heyward	OSU
Line	O'Brien Schofield	WIS	Ryan Kerrigan	PUR	O'Brien Schofield	WIS	Jared Odrick	PSU
Linebacker	Pat Angerer	IOWA	A. J. Edds	IOWA	Pat Angerer	IOWA	Ross Homan	OSU
Linebacker	Greg Jones	MSU	Ross Homan	OSU	Greg Jones	MSU	Josh Hull	PSU
Linebacker	NaVorro Bowman	PSU	Sean Lee	PSU	NaVorro Bowman	PSU	Sean Lee	PSU
Defensive Back	Tyler Sash	IOWA	Donovan Warren*	MICH	Tyler Sash	IOWA	Brett Greenwood	IOWA
Defensive Back	Amari Spievey	IOWA	Sherrick McManis*	NU	Donovan Warren	MICH	Amari Spievey	IOWA
Defensive Back	Brad Phillips	NU	Brandon King*	PUR	Sherrick McManis	NU	Brad Phillips	NU
Defensive Back	Kurt Coleman	OSU	David Pender*	PUR	Kurt Coleman	OSU	David Pender	PUR
			Jay Valai*	WIS
Punter	Zoltan Mesko	MICH	Jeremy Boone	PSU	Zoltan Mesko	MICH	Jeremy Boone	PSU

- Additional honorees due to ties

=== Position key ===
Back	B	Center	C	Cornerback	CB	Defensive back	DB
Defensive end	DE	Defensive lineman	DL	Defensive tackle	DT	End	E
Fullback	FB	Guard	G	Halfback	HB	Kicker	K
Kickoff returner	KR	Offensive tackle	OT	Offensive lineman	OL	Linebacker	LB
Long snapper	LS	Punter	P	Punt returner	PR	Quarterback	QB
Running back	RB	Safety	S	Tight end	TE	Wide receiver	WR

=== All-Americans ===
The following players were chosen as All-Americans for the Associated Press, American Football Coaches Association, ESPN, Football Writers Association of America, CBS Sports, Sports Illustrated, Rivals.com, Scout.com, College Football News, Walter Camp Football Foundation or the Pro Football Weekly teams.

Name	School	Pos.	1st team	2nd team	other
Greg Jones	Michigan State	LB	Associated Press, AFCA-Coaches, ESPN, FWAA-Writers, CBS Sports, Sports Illustrated, Rivals.com, Scout.com, College Football News	WCFF	Pro Football Weekly
Pat Angerer	Iowa	LB	FWAA-Writers, Sports Illustrated, Rivals.com, College Football News	CBS Sports, WCFF, Scout.com, Associated Press	
Brandon Graham	Michigan	DE	ESPN, Rivals.com, Scout.com	WCFF, Sporting News, Associated Press, Sports Illustrated, College Football News	Pro Football Weekly
Jared Odrick	Penn State	DT	AFCA-coaches, CBS Sports	Rivals.com, Associated Press	Pro Football Weekly
Tyler Sash	Iowa	S	CBS Sports	Rivals.com, Sports Illustrated, College Football News	Associated Press
Bryan Bulaga	Iowa	OT	Sporting News	WCFF, Rivals.com, Scout.com, Associated Press	Sports Illustrated, College Football News, Pro Football Weekly
Kurt Coleman	Ohio State	S	Sporting News		Sports Illustrated
NaVorro Bowman	Penn State	LB		CBS Sports, Sporting News, Rivals.com, Sports Illustrated	Associated Press, College Football News, Pro Football Weekly
Zoltan Mesko	Michigan	P		WCFF, Rivals.com, Scout.com, Associated Press	Sports Illustrated, College Football News, Pro Football Weekly
Jon Asamoah	Illinois	OL		Sporting News	Pro Football Weekly
Ryan Kerrigan	Purdue	DE		Rivals.com	Sports Illustrated, College Football News
Amari Spievey	Iowa	CB		Rivals.com	Pro Football Weekly
O'Brien Schofield	Wisconsin	DL		Scout.com	Sports Illustrated, College Football News, Pro Football Weekly
Dace Richardson	Iowa	OL		CBS Sports	
Dennis Landolt	Penn State	OT			Associated Press
John Clay	Wisconsin	RB			Sports Illustrated, College Football News
Adrian Clayborn	Iowa	DL			Sports Illustrated
Ross Homan	Ohio State	LB			Sports Illustrated
Sherrick McManis	Michigan State	DL			Sports Illustrated
Brett Swenson	Michigan State	K			Sports Illustrated, College Football News
Ray Fisher	Indiana	KR			Sports Illustrated, College Football News
Stefen Wisniewski	Penn State	C			College Football News, Pro Football Weekly
Daryll Clark	Penn State	QB			College Football News, Pro Football Weekly
Keith Smith	Purdue	WR			College Football News
Garrett Graham	Wisconsin	TE			College Football News, Pro Football Weekly
Tony Moeaki	Iowa	TE			College Football News
Keshawn Martin	Michigan State	KR			College Football News
Ricky Stanzi	Iowa	QB			Pro Football Weekly
Marvin McNutt	Iowa	WR			Pro Football Weekly
Cameron Heyward	Ohio State	DE			Pro Football Weekly
Adrian Clayborn	Iowa	DE			Pro Football Weekly
Sean Lee	Penn State	LB			Pro Football Weekly

=== All-Star Games ===
The following players were selected to play in post season All-Star Games:

January 23, 2010 East-West Shrine Game

- Jim Cordle
- Doug Worthington
- Daryll Clark
- Jeremy Boone
- Andrew Quarless
- Mike Neal
- Kyle Calloway
- O'Brien Schofield
- Blair White
- Rodger Saffold

Kafka earned offensive MVP; Shofield was named defensive MVP, and White led all receivers with seven catches for 93 yards.

January 30 2010 Senior Bowl

- Kurt Coleman
- A. J. Edds
- Brandon Graham
- Garrett Graham
- Mike Hoomanawanui
- Zoltan Mesko
- Mike Neal
- Jared Odrick
- Brett Swenson

Brandon Graham earned MVP honors with five tackles, two sacks, one forced fumble.

February 6, 2010 Texas vs. The Nation Game

- Dennis Landolt
- A.J. Wallace
- Simoni Lawrence
- Nick Polk
- Josh Hull
- Nathan Triplett
- Aaron Pettrey

All Big Ten Players represented the nation.

== Statistics ==
The Big Ten had two national statistical leaders: Brandon Graham led the nation with 2.17 tackles for a loss per game ahead of national second-place finisher O'Brien Schofield and Ray Fisher led the nation in kickoff return average with 37.35. Greg Jones ranked third nationally in tackles per game at 11.85 followed closely by Pat Angerer who finished fourth. Ryan Kerrigan finished third in quarterback sacks per game with 1.08.

The Big Ten saw several career and single-season Big Ten records fall. Mike Kafka broke Drew Brees 1998 record for single-season offensive plays (642 vs. 638). Fisher's return average was a Big Ten single-season record, surpassing the 1965 record. Troy Stoudermire accumulated 43 kickoff returns, which tied Earl Douthitt's 1973 single-season total. David Gilreath's 108 career kickoff returns surpassed the 106 set by Brandon Williams (2002–05) and Derrick Mason (1993–96). Other near single-season records were Tyler Sash's 203 interception return yards, which fell short of the 207 set in 2003 by Alan Zemaitis and Ryan Kerrigan's 7 forced fumbles, which was short of the 8 set by Jonal Saint-Dic in 2007. Jim Tressel became the second head coach to secure five consecutive Big Ten championships.

== Attendance ==
In 2009, the Big Ten established a new overall conference attendance record with 5,526,237 fans attending 77 home games. This surpassed the previous record set in 2002 when a total of 5,499,439 was reached in 78 contests. Below is a table of home game attendances.

Team	Stadium	Capacity	Game 1	Game 2	Game 3	Game 4	Game 5	Game 6	Game 7	Game 8	Total	Average	% of Capacity
Illinois	Memorial Stadium	62,872	62,347	62,870	62,870	60,119	60,523	—	—	—	308,729	61,745	98.2
Indiana	Memorial Stadium	52,692	36,759	35,162	51,500	42,358	36,611	48,607	—	—	250,997	41,832	79.3
Iowa	Kinnick Stadium	70,585	70,585	70,585	67,989	70,585	70,585	70,585	70,585	—	491,490	70,212	99.4
Michigan	Michigan Stadium	106,201	109,019	110,278	107,903	108,118	106,304	110,377	108,543	110,922	871,464	108,933	102.5
Michigan State	Spartan Stadium	75,005	74,518	76,221	78,629	71,726	74,411	73,910	73,771	—	523,186	74,740	99.6
Minnesota	TCF Bank Stadium	50,805	50,805	50,805	50,805	50,805	50,805	50,805	50,805	—	346,635	50,805	100.0
Northwestern	Ryan Field	47,130	17,857	19,239	22,091	23,085	24,364	30,546	32,150	—	169,332	24,190	51.3
Ohio State	Ohio Stadium	102,329	105,092	106,033	105,219	105,301	105,011	104,719	105,455	—	736,830	105,261	102.8
Penn State	Beaver Stadium	107,282	104,968	106,387	105,514	109,316	104,488	107,981	110,033	107,379	856,369	107,046	99.7
Purdue	Ross–Ade Stadium	62,500	47,551	53,240	59,082	47,163	50,404	47,349	48,408	—	353,197	50,456	80.7
Wisconsin	Camp Randall Stadium	80,321	80,532	80,355	78,253	80,123	81,043	79,920	80,540	—	560,746	80,106	99.7

== Academic honors ==
26 Big Ten student-athletes were named to the Academic All-District teams presented by ESPN The Magazine, including 18 first-team selections: Illinois' Jon Asamoah, Indiana's Brandon Bugg, Trea Burgess and Ben Chappell, Michigan's Zoltan Mesko, Michigan State's Blair White, Minnesota's Eric Decker and Jeff Tow-Arnett, Northwestern's Doug Bartels, Stefan Demos and Zeke Markshausen, Penn State's Jeremy Boone, Josh Hull, Andrew Pitz and Stefen Wisniewski, Purdue's Joe Holland and Ryan Kerrigan and Wisconsin's Brad Nortman. The Nittany Lions were one of only six schools nationwide with four or more first-team selections. Second-team picks included the Hawkeyes' Julian Vandervelde, the Wolverines' Jon Conover, the Spartans' Adam Decker and Andrew Hawken and the Buckeyes' Bryant Browning, Todd Denlinger, Andrew Moses and Marcus Williams. To be eligible for the award, a player must be in at least his second year of athletic eligibility, be a first-team or key performer and carry a cumulative 3.30 grade point average. First-team selections will be added to the national ballot and are eligible for Academic All-America honors to be announced on November 24. Penn State's Hull and Pitz are looking to earn Academic All-America accolades for the second straight year.

For the fifth consecutive season the Big Ten had more (8) student-athletes named to the ESPN The Magazine Academic All-America first or second teams in football than any other conference whether they be a member of the Football Bowl Subdivision (FBS) or the Football Championship Subdivision (FCS). The Big Ten also had six of the fifteen first-team selections, which led the nation. FCS' Missouri Valley Conference was second with five first or second team selections and the FBS' Big 12 Conference had four honorees. Only the Big 12 and Southeastern Conference had two first team selections. The Academic All-America first-team honorees from the Big Ten include Zoltan Mesko, Blair White, Zeke Markshausen, Josh Hull, Andrew Pitz and Stefen Wisniewski. Second-team honors went to Northwestern's Stefan Demos and Purdue's Ryan Kerrigan. Hull and Pitz were repeat first-team selections. The Big Ten conference also recognized 193 football players as fall term 2009-10 Academic All-Conference honorees, including Purdue's Joe Holland who has maintained a 4.0 Grade Point Average. The student-athletes honorees were letterwinners in at least their second academic year at their institution and who carry a cumulative grade point average of 3.0 or higher.

== 2010 NFL draft ==
The 2010 saw 34 Big Ten athletes selected. This included at least one representative from each member school, making the Big Ten one of only two conferences to have each of its members represented among the draft selections. Iowa and Penn State each had six selections. The Big Ten had three first round selections: Big Ten Silver Football co-winner Brandon Graham was selected 13th overall by Philadelphia. Big Ten Offensive Lineman of the Year Bryan Bulaga 23rd by Green Bay, while Big Ten Defensive Player and Lineman of the Year Jared Odrick was chosen 28th overall by Miami.

Round #	Pick #	NFL team	Player	Position	College
1	13	Philadelphia Eagles ^{(from San Francisco via Denver)}	Brandon Graham	Defensive end	Michigan
1	23	Green Bay Packers	Bryan Bulaga	Offensive tackle	Iowa
1	28	Miami Dolphins ^{(from San Diego)}	Jared Odrick	Defensive tackle	Penn State
2	33	St. Louis Rams	Rodger Saffold	Offensive tackle	Indiana
2	39	Tampa Bay Buccaneers ^{(from Oakland)}	Arrelious Benn	Wide receiver	Illinois
2	55	Dallas Cowboys ^{(from Philadelphia)}	Sean Lee	Linebacker	Penn State
2	56	Green Bay Packers	Mike Neal	Defensive tackle	Purdue
2	63	Indianapolis Colts	Pat Angerer	Linebacker	Iowa
3	66	Detroit Lions	Amari Spievey	Cornerback	Iowa
3	68	Kansas City Chiefs	Jon Asamoah	Offensive guard	Illinois
3	87	Denver Broncos ^{(from Philadelphia)}	Eric Decker	Wide receiver	Minnesota
3	91	San Francisco 49ers ^{(from San Diego)}	NaVorro Bowman	Linebacker	Penn State
3	93	Kansas City Chiefs ^{(from Minnesota via Houston)}	Tony Moeaki	Tight end	Iowa
4	109	Chicago Bears	Corey Wootton	Defensive end	Northwestern
4	116	Pittsburgh Steelers	Thaddeus Gibson	Defensive end	Ohio State
4	118	Houston Texans	Garrett Graham	Tight end	Wisconsin
4	119	Miami Dolphins ^{(from New England via Oakland, New England, and Dallas)}	A. J. Edds	Linebacker	Iowa
4	122	Philadelphia Eagles ^{(from Green Bay)}	Mike Kafka	Quarterback	Northwestern
4	130	Arizona Cardinals ^{(from New Orleans)}	O'Brien Schofield	Defensive end	Wisconsin
5	132	St. Louis Rams	Michael Hoomanawanui	Tight end	Illinois
5	144	Houston Texans ^{(from Carolina via Kansas City)}	Sherrick McManis	Cornerback	Northwestern
5	150	New England Patriots ^{(from Houston)}	Zoltan Mesko	Punter	Michigan
5	154	Green Bay Packers	Andrew Quarless	Tight end	Penn State
5	167	Minnesota Vikings	Nathan Triplett	Linebacker	Minnesota
7	214	Minnesota Vikings ^{(from Cleveland via Detroit)}	Mickey Shuler, Jr.	Tight end	Penn State
7	215	Oakland Raiders	Jeremy Ware	Cornerback	Michigan State
7	216	Buffalo Bills	Kyle Calloway	Offensive tackle	Iowa
7	232	Denver Broncos ^{(from Baltimore via Tampa Bay)}	Jammie Kirlew	Defensive end	Indiana
7	242	Pittsburgh Steelers	Doug Worthington	Defensive end	Ohio State
7	244	Philadelphia Eagles	Kurt Coleman	Safety	Ohio State
7	246	Indianapolis Colts	Ray Fisher	Cornerback	Indiana
7	251	Oakland Raiders	Stevie Brown	Safety	Michigan
7	252	Miami Dolphins	Austin Spitler	Linebacker	Ohio State
7	254	St. Louis Rams	Josh Hull	Linebacker	Penn State

== See also ==
- 2009–10 Big Ten Conference men's basketball season
