= 2009 Indiana Hoosiers football team =

American college football season

2009 Indiana Hoosiers football
- Conference: Big Ten Conference
- Record: 4–8 (1–7 Big Ten)
- Head coach: Bill Lynch (3rd season)
- Offensive coordinator: Matt Canada (3rd season)
- Offensive scheme: Pistol
- Co-defensive coordinators: Brian George (5th season); Joe Palcic (5th season)
- Base defense: 4–3
- MVP: Jammie Kirlew
- Captains: Ben Chappell; Jammie Kirlew; Will Patterson; Rodger Saffold
- Home stadium: Memorial Stadium

2009 Big Ten Conference football standings
	Conf.			Overall
Team	W		L	W		L
No. 5 Ohio State $	7	–	1	11	–	2
No. 7 Iowa %	6	–	2	11	–	2
No. 9 Penn State	6	–	2	11	–	2
Northwestern	5	–	3	8	–	5
No. 16 Wisconsin	5	–	3	10	–	3
Michigan State	4	–	4	6	–	7
Purdue	4	–	4	5	–	7
Minnesota	3	–	5	6	–	7
Illinois	2	–	6	3	–	9
Michigan	1	–	7	5	–	7
Indiana	1	–	7	4	–	8
$ – BCS representative as conference champion; % – BCS at-large representative; Rankings from AP Poll

The 2009 Indiana Hoosiers football team represented Indiana University Bloomington during the 2009 NCAA Division I FBS football season. The Hoosiers were led by Bill Lynch, who was in his third season as head coach. The Hoosiers played their home games at Memorial Stadium in Bloomington, Indiana. The Hoosiers finished the season 4–8 (1–7 Big Ten).

== Schedule ==
Date	Time	Opponent	Site	TV	Result	Attendance	Source
September 3	8:00 pm	Eastern Kentucky*	Memorial Stadium; Bloomington, IN	BTN	W 19–13	36,759	
September 12	12:00 pm	Western Michigan*	Memorial Stadium; Bloomington, IN	BTN	W 23–19	35,162	
September 19	3:30 pm	at Akron*	InfoCision Stadium; Akron, OH	ESPNU	W 38–21	18,340	
September 26	12:00 pm	at No. 23 Michigan	Michigan Stadium; Ann Arbor, MI	ESPN2	L 33–36	108,118	
October 3	7:00 pm	No. 13 Ohio State	Memorial Stadium; Bloomington, IN	BTN	L 14–33	51,500	
October 10	3:30 pm	at Virginia*	Scott Stadium; Charlottesville, VA	ESPN360	L 7–47	45,371	
October 17	7:00 pm	Illinois^{†}	Memorial Stadium; Bloomington, IN (rivalry)	BTN	W 27–14	42,358	
October 24	12:00 pm	at Northwestern	Ryan Field; Evanston, IL	BTN	L 28–29	24,364	
October 31	12:00 pm	at No. 7 Iowa	Kinnick Stadium; Iowa City, IA	ESPN	L 24–42	70,585	
November 7	12:00 pm	No. 21 Wisconsin	Memorial Stadium; Bloomington, IN	BTN	L 28–31	36,611	
November 14	12:00 pm	at No. 17 Penn State	Beaver Stadium; University Park, PA	BTN	L 20–31	107,379	
November 21	3:30 pm	Purdue	Memorial Stadium; Bloomington, IN (Old Oaken Bucket)	BTN	L 21–38	48,607	
*Non-conference game; ^{†}Homecoming; Rankings from Coaches' Poll released prior to the game; All times are in Eastern time

== Roster ==
2009 Indiana Hoosiers football team roster
Players
Coaches
Offense

Pos.	#	Name	Class
OL	61	Chris Ahlfeld	Fr
WR	80	Chris Banks	Sr
RB	41	David Blackwell	Fr
TE	83	Ted Bolser	Fr
OT	73	James Brewer	Jr
OL	74	Charlie Chapman	Fr
QB	4	Ben Chappell	Jr
WR	84	Jamonne Chester	Fr
WR	2	Tandon Doss	So
OL	79	Cody Faulkner	Jr
OL	50	Steve Fiacable Jr.	Fr
OT	77	Josh Hager	So
QB	16	Dusty Kiel	Fr
WR	20	Michael Lanning	Fr
TE	85	Charles Love III	Fr
OL	62	Jordan Marquette	Jr
TE	86	Brad Martin	Jr
WR	23	Brett Martin	Fr
C	60	Will Matte	Fr
LB	43	Matt Mayberry	Sr
OT	76	Rodger Saffold	Sr
TE, LS	95	Jeff Sanders	Jr
OL	64	Pete Saxon	Sr
QB	17	Teddy Schell	So

Defense

Pos.	#	Name	Class
CB	23	Adrian Burks	Jr
DE	53	Kevin Bush	So
LB	45	Dimitrius Carr	Fr
LB	25	Justin Carrington	Sr
DT	78	Anthony Carter	So
DE	61	Michael Carter	Fr
DL	94	Javon Cornley	Fr
CB	6	Richard Council	Jr
S	24	Shane Covington	Fr
S	14	Jerimy Finch	Jr
CB	7	Ray Fisher	Sr
DE	44	Darius Johnson	So
CB	10	Donnell Jones	So
DE	93	Fred Jones	So
DE	57	Jammie Kirlew	Sr
S	40	Matt Kurz	Sr
CB	22	Andre LaGrone	So
LB	54	Jamie Lukaszewski	Jr
DL	55	Deonte Mack	Jr
S	8	Nick Polk	Sr
DL	98	Adam Replogle	Fr
LB	46	Tyler Replogle	Jr
LB	42	Chad Sherer	Fr
LB	33	Damon Sims	Fr
DT	75	Nicholas Sliger	Fr
DT	52	Jarrod Smith	Jr
CB	36	Peter St. Fort	Fr
LB	91	Greg Svarczkopf	Fr
S	37	Collin Taylor	Sr
S	20	Austin Thomas	Sr
DE	90	Eric Thomas	So
DE	51	Terrance Thomas	Jr

Special teams

Pos.	#	Name	Class
LS	53	Brandon Bugg	Sr
K	91	Nick Ford	Jr
K	99	Nick Freeland	Fr
P	10	Adam Pines	Fr

Head coach

- Bill Lynch

Coordinators/assistant coaches

Legend

- (C) Team captain
- (S) Suspended
- (I) Ineligible
- Injured
- Redshirt

Roster
Last update: 2009-12-10

== 2010 NFL draftees ==
Player	Round	Pick	Position	NFL club
Rodger Saffold	2	1	Offensive tackle	St. Louis Rams
Jammie Kirlew	7	25	Defensive end	Denver Broncos
Ray Fisher	7	39	Defensive back	Indianapolis Colts
