= 2009 All-Big Ten Conference football team =

American college football all-star team

The 2009 All-Big Ten Conference football team consists of American football players chosen as All-Big Ten Conference players for the 2009 Big Ten Conference football season. The conference recognizes two official All-Big Ten selectors: (1) the Big Ten conference coaches selected separate offensive and defensive units and named first- and second-team players (the "Coaches" team); and (2) a panel of sports writers and broadcasters covering the Big Ten also selected offensive and defensive units and named first- and second-team players (the "Media" team).

== Offensive selections ==
=== Quarterbacks ===
- Daryll Clark, Penn State (Coaches-1; Media-1)
- Mike Kafka, Northwestern (Coaches-2; Media-2)

=== Running backs ===
- Evan Royster, Penn State (Coaches-1; Media-1)
- John Clay, Wisconsin (Coaches-1; Media-1)
- Brandon Saine, Ohio State (Coaches-2; Media-2)
- Ralph Bolden, Purdue (Coaches-2; Media-2)

=== Receivers ===
- Blair White, Michigan State (Coaches-1; Media-2)
- Tandon Doss, Indiana (Coaches-2; Media-1)
- Keith Smith, Purdue (Coaches-2; Media-1)
- Eric Decker, Minnesota (Coaches-1)
- Derrell Johnson-Koulianos, Iowa (Coaches-2)
- Zeke Markshausen, Northwestern (Media-2)

=== Centers ===
- Stefen Wisniewski, Penn State (Coaches-1; Media-1)
- Rafael Eubanks, Iowa (Coaches-2 [tie]; Media-2)
- Joel Nitchman, Michigan State (Coaches-2 [tie])

=== Guards ===
- John Moffitt, Wisconsin (Coaches-1; Media-1)
- Dace Richardson, Iowa (Coaches-1; Media-2)
- Justin Boren, Ohio State (Coaches-2; Media-1)
- Jon Asamoah, Illinois (Coaches-2; Media-2)

=== Tackles ===
- Bryan Bulaga, Iowa (Coaches-1; Media-1)
- Dennis Landolt, Penn State (Coaches-1; Media-2)
- Gabe Carimi, Wisconsin (Coaches-2; Media-1)
- Rodger Saffold, Indiana (Coaches-2)
- Kyle Calloway, Iowa (Media-2)

=== Tight ends ===
- Tony Moeaki, Iowa (Coaches-1; Media-2)
- Garrett Graham, Wisconsin (Coaches-2; Media-1)

== Defensive selections ==
=== Defensive linemen ===
- Adrian Clayborn, Iowa (Coaches-1; Media-1)
- Brandon Graham, Michigan (Coaches-1; Media-1)
- O'Brien Schofield, Wisconsin (Coaches-1; Media-1)
- Jared Odrick, Penn State (Coaches-1; Media-2)
- Ryan Kerrigan, Purdue (Coaches-2; Media-1)
- Jammie Kirlew, Indiana (Coaches-2; Media-2)
- Thaddeus Gibson, Ohio State (Coaches-2; Media-2)
- Cameron Heyward, Ohio State (Coaches-2; Media-2)

=== Linebackers ===
- Pat Angerer, Iowa (Coaches-1; Media-1)
- Greg Jones, Michigan State (Coaches-1; Media-1)
- NaVorro Bowman, Penn State (Coaches-1; Media-1)
- Ross Homan, Ohio State (Coaches-2; Media-2)
- Sean Lee, Penn State (Coaches-2; Media-2)
- A.J. Edds, Iowa (Coaches-2)
- Josh Hull, Penn State (Media-2)

=== Defensive backs ===
- Tyler Sash, Iowa (Coaches-1; Media-1)
- Kurt Coleman, Ohio State (Coaches-1; Media-1)
- Amari Spievey, Iowa (Coaches-1; Media-2)
- Brad Phillips, Northwestern (Coaches-1; Media-2)
- Donovan Warren, Michigan (Coaches-2; Media-1)
- Sherrick McManis, Northwestern (Coaches-2; Media-1)
- David Pender, Purdue (Coaches-2; Media-2)
- Brandon King, Purdue (Coaches-2)
- Jay Valai, Wisconsin (Coaches-2)
- Brett Greenwood, Iowa (Media-2)

== Special teams ==
=== Kickers ===
- Brett Swenson, Michigan State (Coaches-1; Media-1)
- Stefan Demos, Northwestern (Coaches-2; Media-2)

=== Punter ===
- Zoltan Mesko, Michigan (Coaches-1; Media-1)
- Jeremy Boone, Penn State (Coaches-2; Media-2)

== Key ==
Bold = Consensus first-team selection by both the coaches and media

Coaches = Selected by the Big Ten Conference coaches

Media = Selected by the conference media

== See also ==
- 2009 College Football All-America Team
