= A. J. Edds =

American football player (born 1987)

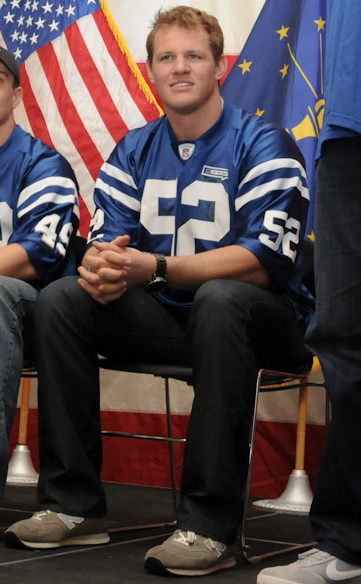
- Edds with the Indianapolis Colts in 2012

No. 90, 52, 55, 57
- Position: Linebacker

Personal information
- Born: September 18, 1987 (age 39); Marion, Indiana, U.S.
- Listed height: 6 ft 4 in (1.93 m)
- Listed weight: 246 lb (112 kg)

Career information
- High school: Greenwood Community (Greenwood, Indiana)
- College: Iowa
- NFL draft: 2010: 4th round, 119th overall pick

Career history
- Miami Dolphins (2010); New England Patriots (2011); Indianapolis Colts (2011−2012); New England Patriots (2013)*; New York Jets (2014); Jacksonville Jaguars (2014)
- * Offseason or practice squad member only

Awards and highlights
- Second-team All-Big Ten (2009)

Career NFL statistics
- Total tackles: 14
- Stats at Pro Football Reference

Andrew James Edds (born September 18, 1987) is an American former professional football player who was a linebacker in the National Football League (NFL). He was selected by the Miami Dolphins in the fourth round of the 2010 NFL draft. He played college football for the Iowa Hawkeyes.

He has been a member of the Indianapolis Colts, New England Patriots and New York Jets.

== Professional career ==
=== Miami Dolphins ===
He was expected to contribute immediately as a nickel linebacker due to his strong pass coverage skills at Iowa, but he tore his right anterior cruciate ligament (ACL) during the 2010 training camp and was lost for his rookie season. He was waived on September 5, 2011.

=== New England Patriots ===
Edds was claimed off waivers by the New England Patriots on September 6. He was waived on September 22, but re-signed to the Patriots practice squad on September 24.

=== Indianapolis Colts ===
On September 28, 2011, he was signed off the Patriots' practice squad by the Indianapolis Colts, reuniting him with friend and former teammate at Iowa Pat Angerer. On July 31, 2012, Edds tore his ACL. He was waived/injured, and was subsequently placed on injured reserve on August 2.

=== New England Patriots ===
On June 6, 2013, Edds was signed by the New England Patriots. On August 19, 2013, he was released by the Patriots.

=== New York Jets ===
Edds was signed by the Jets on May 19, 2014, after trying out for the team during rookie minicamp. He was released on August 30, 2014. He was re-signed by the team on September 1, 2014. Edds was released on October 28, 2014.

=== Jacksonville Jaguars ===
On December 3, 2014, Edds was signed by the Jacksonville Jaguars after they placed starting right tackle, Austin Pasztor, on injured reserve. Edds became a free agent after the 2014 season.
