= Thaddeus Gibson =

American football player (born 1987)

No. 59, 93
- Position: Defensive end

Personal information
- Born: October 21, 1987 (age 39); Euclid, Ohio, U.S.
- Listed height: 6 ft 2 in (1.88 m)
- Listed weight: 240 lb (109 kg)

Career information
- High school: Euclid
- College: Ohio State
- NFL draft: 2010: 4th round, 116th overall pick

Career history
- Pittsburgh Steelers (2010); San Francisco 49ers (2010); Washington Redskins (2011)*; Houston Texans (2011)*; Chicago Bears (2011); Tennessee Titans (2012−2013)*; Dallas Cowboys (2013)*; Toronto Argonauts (2014); Winnipeg Blue Bombers (2014–2015)
- * Offseason or practice squad member only

Awards and highlights
- Second-team All-Big Ten (2009)

Career NFL statistics
- Total tackles: 3
- Forced fumbles: 1
- Stats at Pro Football Reference

Thaddeus Gibson (born October 21, 1987) is an American former professional football player who was a defensive end in the National Football League (NFL). He played college football for the Ohio State Buckeyes and was selected by the Pittsburgh Steelers in the fourth round of the 2010 NFL draft.

He was also a member of the San Francisco 49ers, Houston Texans, Washington Redskins, Chicago Bears, Tennessee Titans, Dallas Cowboys, Toronto Argonauts and Winnipeg Blue Bombers.

== Early life ==
Gibson attended Euclid High School in Euclid, Ohio, where he had 50 tackles, 17 sacks, 22 QB hurries, and two interceptions as a junior. In his senior year, he collected 39 total tackles, 10 quarterback sacks and eight tackles behind the line of scrimmage.

Considered a four-star recruit by Rivals.com, Gibson was listed the No. 9 outside linebacker prospect in the nation. He chose Ohio State over Michigan and Tennessee.

== College career ==
After redshirting his initial year at Ohio State, Gibson was part of three special teams units in 2007. He recorded 11 tackles, including 3 for a loss of yardage, as well as a quarterback sack and a forced fumble over the course of the season.

In his sophomore season, Gibson earned a place in the starting lineup at defensive end. He compiled 26 tackles, 9 tackles for a loss, and 5 sacks for the year.

== Professional career ==
=== Pittsburgh Steelers ===
Gibson was selected with the fourth round pick of the Pittsburgh Steelers, 116th overall in the 2010 NFL Draft. Gibson appeared in two games before being waived on the Steelers' bye week.

=== San Francisco 49ers ===
On November 1, 2010, Gibson was claimed off waivers by the San Francisco 49ers. He played two games with the 49ers and recorded two tackles and one forced fumble on special teams. Gibson was released by the 49ers prior to the 2011 season, on August 15.

=== Washington Redskins ===
Gibson signed with the Washington Redskins on August 17, 2011, and was waived on September 3, 2011.

=== Houston Texans ===
Gibson was signed to the practice squad of the Houston Texans on October 12, 2011. He was released on November 23, 2011.

=== Chicago Bears ===
Gibson was signed to the practice squad of the Chicago Bears on November 30, 2011. He was promoted to the active roster on December 20, 2011 and appeared in two games. On August 26, 2012, the Bears released Gibson.

=== Tennessee Titans ===
On October 17, 2012, the Tennessee Titans signed Gibson to the practice squad. On December 31, 2012, the Titans signed Gibson to a reserve/future contract. On August 11, 2013, he was waived by the Titans.

=== Dallas Cowboys ===
On August 13, 2013, Gibson was claimed off waivers by the Dallas Cowboys. On August 31, 2013, he was released by the Cowboys.

=== Toronto Argonauts ===
On May 7, 2014, Gibson signed with the Toronto Argonauts of the Canadian Football League.

=== Winnipeg Blue Bombers ===
On September 2, 2014, Gibson was traded to the Winnipeg Blue Bombers in exchange for defensive back Alex Suber.
