= Andrew Brewer =

Canadian ice hockey coach

- Born: March 11, 1986 (age 40); Moncton, New Brunswick, Canada
- Occupation: General Manager
- Employer: Michigan Wolverines

Andrew Brewer (born March 11, 1986) is a Canadian ice hockey coach. He is currently an assistant coach with the Michigan Wolverines men's ice hockey of the NCAA .

On June 16, 2015, Brewer was named by the Toronto Maple Leafs as an assistant coach under Mike Babcock. His contract was not renewed on August 14, 2020

On July 1, 2025, Brewer was named assistant coach under the Anaheim Ducks, serving under Joel Quenneville.

On August 6, 2026, Brewer was named as the General Manager/Chief of Staff of the Michigan Wolverines men's ice hockey, working under Brandon Naurato.
