= Nate Triplett =

American football player (born 1987)

Nathan Triplett
No. 54
- Position: Linebacker

Personal information
- Born: March 15, 1987 (age 39); Maple Plain, Minnesota, U.S.
- Listed height: 6 ft 3 in (1.91 m)
- Listed weight: 240 lb (109 kg)

Career information
- High school: Delano
- College: Minnesota
- NFL draft: 2010: 5th round, 167th overall pick

Career history
- Minnesota Vikings (2010)*; San Diego Chargers (2010)*; Indianapolis Colts (2010–2011); San Diego Chargers (2011); Tampa Bay Buccaneers (2012)*
- * Offseason or practice squad member only

Career NFL statistics
- Total tackles: 4
- Stats at Pro Football Reference

Nathan Triplett (born March 15, 1987) is an American former professional football player who was a linebacker in the National Football League (NFL). After playing college football for the Minnesota Golden Gophers, he was selected by the Minnesota Vikings in the fifth round of the 2010 NFL draft. He was also a member of the San Diego Chargers, Indianapolis Colts, and Tampa Bay Buccaneers.

== Early life ==
Triplett played in the Wright County Conference, graduating from Delano High School, in Delano, Minnesota, in 2005.

== College career ==
Triplett attended the University of Minnesota, where he initially was a special teams force and eventually worked his way into a dominant linebacker. In his senior season, in the first game of the year, he had possibly a game-saving interception, when vs Syracuse University in overtime he intercepted a pass in the Gophers own end zone to end the possession and give the Gophers the ball. The Gophers kicked a field goal on their possession to win the game. The next week vs United States Air Force Academy, with about 12 minutes left in the game, he recovered a fumble and returned it 52 yards for a touchdown, to break the 10–10 tie. The game ended at 20–13, so his touchdown was the game winner.

== Professional career ==
=== Minnesota Vikings ===
Triplett was selected by the Minnesota Vikings in the fifth round (167th overall) of the 2010 NFL draft. He was signed to a contract on June 14, 2010. He was released on August 31, 2010, as a part of preseason cuts.

=== San Diego Chargers ===
On October 5, 2010, the San Diego Chargers signed Triplett to the practice squad.

=== Indianapolis Colts ===
On December 1, 2010, the Indianapolis Colts signed the free agent rookie to their active roster. He was waived on October 5, 2011.

=== Tampa Bay Buccaneers ===
On July 29, 2012, the Tampa Bay Buccaneers signed Triplett, after releasing Dezmon Briscoe two days earlier. He was placed on the exempt/left squad list after leaving the team on August 2.
