= David Pender =

American gridiron football player (born 1987)

No. 34, 37
- Position: Cornerback

Personal information
- Born: December 4, 1987 (age 38); Folkston, Georgia, U.S.
- Listed height: 6 ft 0 in (1.83 m)
- Listed weight: 174 lb (79 kg)

Career information
- High school: Charlton County (Folkston)
- College: Purdue
- NFL draft: 2010: undrafted

Career history
- Philadelphia Eagles (2010)*; Baltimore Ravens (2010)*; Indianapolis Colts (2010); Cincinnati Bengals (2010–2011); Winnipeg Blue Bombers (2012)*
- * Offseason or practice squad member only

Awards and highlights
- Second-team All-Big Ten (2009)

Career NFL statistics
- Total tackles: 2
- Stats at Pro Football Reference

David Pender (born December 4, 1987) is an American former professional football player who was a cornerback in the National Football League (NFL). He played college football for the Purdue Boilermakers and was signed by the Philadelphia Eagles as an undrafted free agent in 2010.

Pender was also a member of the Baltimore Ravens, Indianapolis Colts and Cincinnati Bengals.

== Professional career ==
=== Philadelphia Eagles ===
After going undrafted in the 2010 NFL draft, Pender signed with the Philadelphia Eagles as an undrafted free agent on April 26, 2010. He was cut on September 3, 2010.

=== Baltimore Ravens ===
He was signed to the Baltimore Ravens practice squad on September 8, 2010. He was later waived on September 21.

=== Indianapolis Colts ===
Pender was signed to the Indianapolis Colts practice squad on November 10, 2010. He was promoted to the active roster on December 8, 2010. He was waived on December 27 having only played in 2 games for the Colts.

=== Cincinnati Bengals ===
Pender was claimed off waivers by the Cincinnati Bengals on December 28, 2010. He was waived on September 3.
