= Zeke Markshausen =

American football player and coach (born 1987)

No. 5
- Position: Wide receiver

Personal information
- Born: January 26, 1987 (age 39); Capron, Illinois, U.S.
- Listed height: 5 ft 11 in (1.80 m)
- Listed weight: 185 lb (84 kg)

Career information
- College: Northwestern
- NFL draft: 2010: undrafted

Career history

Playing
- Chicago Bears (2010)*; Kansas City Chiefs (2011–2012)*
- * Offseason or practice squad member only

Coaching
- North Shore Country Day School (2013–2015) Wide receivers coach

Awards and highlights
- Second-team All-Big Ten (2009)
- Stats at Pro Football Reference

Zeke Robert Markshausen (born January 26, 1987) is an American former professional football player who was a wide receiver for the Kansas City Chiefs of the National Football League (NFL). He played college football for the Northwestern Wildcats and was signed by the Chicago Bears as an undrafted free agent in 2010.

== Professional career ==
Following a mini-camp tryout, Markshausen was signed by the Chicago Bears on August 8, 2010. He was waived on August 30.

Markshausen spent the entire 2010 season out of football and signed with the Kansas City Chiefs on July 30, 2011. He was waived during final roster cuts on September 3, but was signed to the team's practice squad on November 30. He was released from the practice squad on December 4. Following the 2011 season, Markshausen re-signed with the Chiefs on February 29, 2012. He was released by the Chiefs on August 26, 2012.

== Coaching history ==
In 2013, Markshausen accepted an offer to be the receivers coach at North Shore Country Day School in Winnetka, Illinois.
