= Kyle Calloway =

American football player (1987–2016)

No. 60
- Position: Offensive tackle

Personal information
- Born: June 21, 1987; Belleville, Illinois, U.S.
- Died: July 2, 2016 (aged 29); Vail, Arizona, U.S.
- Listed height: 6 ft 7 in (2.01 m)
- Listed weight: 323 lb (147 kg)

Career information
- High school: Belleville (IL) East
- College: Iowa
- NFL draft: 2010: 7th round, 216th overall pick

Career history
- Buffalo Bills (2010)*; Hartford Colonials (2011)*; Baltimore Ravens (2011)*
- * Offseason or practice squad member only

Awards and highlights
- 2× Second-team All-Big Ten (2008, 2009)
- Stats at Pro Football Reference

Kyle Calloway (June 21, 1987 – July 2, 2016) was an American football offensive tackle. He was selected by the Buffalo Bills in the seventh round of the 2010 NFL draft out of the University of Iowa. He was also a member of the Hartford Colonials and Baltimore Ravens. Calloway was killed when struck by a train while jogging in Vail, Arizona, on July 2, 2016.

== Early life ==
As a military dependant, Calloway attended three high schools in four years. He graduated from Belleville East High School in Belleville, Illinois, where he was an all-city and all-conference tackle as a senior, and also played tight end and primarily defensive tackle as a junior.

Considered a three-star recruit by Rivals.com, Calloway was ranked 55th among offensive tackle prospects in the nation. He chose Iowa over Missouri, Kansas, and Arizona.

== College career ==
After redshirting his initial year at Iowa, Calloway saw limited action as a back-up at left guard in 2006. In 2007, he became the starting left tackle, but was replaced with Bryan Bulaga and moved to right tackle in 2008. He received an All-Big Ten Honorable Mention as a junior.

In 2009, Calloway was listed at No. 13 on Rivals.com's preseason offensive tackle power ranking. In June of that year, he was arrested and "charged with operating a vehicle while intoxicated" while driving a moped.

== Professional career ==
=== Pre-draft ===
Calloway was considered to be a late-round draft prospect in the 2010 NFL draft, and drew comparisons to Marc Colombo. According to NFL.com's Gil Brandt, "Calloway should be a solid pro starter" at right tackle in the NFL.

Pre-draft measurables
| Height | Weight | Arm length | Hand span |
|---|---|---|---|
| 6 ft 6 in (1.98 m) | 323 lb (147 kg) | 33 1/4 in (0.84 m) | 10 1/8 in (0.26 m) |
All values from NFL Combine

=== Buffalo Bills ===
He was selected by the Buffalo Bills in the seventh round (216th overall). On June 8, 2010, Calloway signed a multi-year contract with the Bills. He was released on August 30, 2010.

=== Hartford Colonials ===
Calloway signed to play 2011 for the United Football League's Hartford Colonials.

=== Baltimore Ravens ===
On August 9, 2011, Calloway signed with the Baltimore Ravens, but was waived on August 21.

== Death ==
On July 2, 2016, Calloway was jogging alongside a set of railroad tracks and was hit from behind by a train, killing him.
