= Tyler Sash =

American football player (1988–2015)

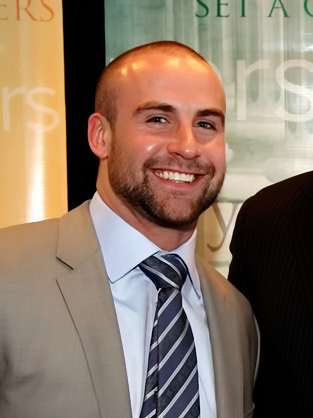
- Sash at Drake University in 2012

No. 39
- Position: Safety

Personal information
- Born: May 27, 1988; Oskaloosa, Iowa, U.S.
- Died: September 8, 2015 (aged 27); Oskaloosa, Iowa, U.S.
- Listed height: 6 ft 0 in (1.83 m)
- Listed weight: 215 lb (98 kg)

Career information
- High school: Oskaloosa (Iowa)
- College: Iowa
- NFL draft: 2011: 6th round, 198th overall pick

Career history
- New York Giants (2011–2012)

Awards and highlights
- Super Bowl champion (XLVI); Third-team All-American (2009); 2× First-team All-Big Ten (2009, 2010)

Career NFL statistics
- Total tackles: 26
- Forced fumbles: 1
- Stats at Pro Football Reference

Tyler Jordan Sash (May 27, 1988 – September 8, 2015) was an American professional football safety for the University of Iowa Hawkeyes and the New York Giants of the National Football League (NFL). He was selected by the Giants in the sixth round of the 2011 NFL draft.

== College career ==
Sash played safety while with the Iowa Hawkeyes. He had 13 career interceptions for the Hawkeyes, which was five shy of the school record for career interceptions, originally set by Nile Kinnick from 1937 to 1939. He holds the Iowa record for career interception return yards with 392, a mark which also ranks fifth in Big Ten history.

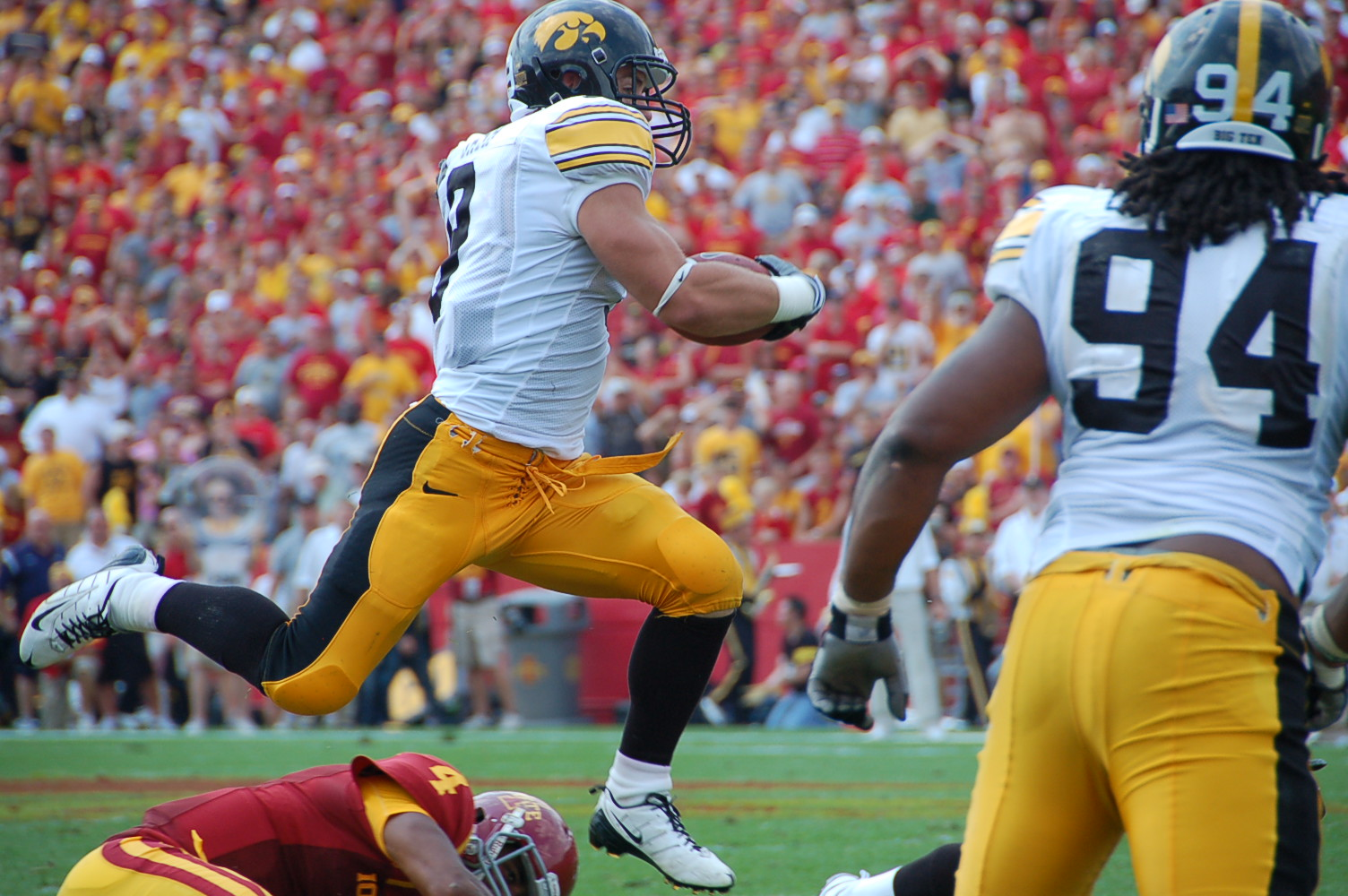
Sash with the Hawkeyes in 2009

Sash was named to the 2010 pre-season Lott Trophy watchlist, a trophy named in honor of former college and Pro Football Hall of Fame defensive back Ronnie Lott and presented annually to the college football defensive player of the year. He was also named to the 2010 pre-season Bronko Nagurski watch list, awarded annually by the Football Writers Association of America to the nation's best defensive player.

== Professional career ==
Pre-draft measurables
Height	Weight	Arm length	Hand span	Wingspan	40-yard dash	10-yard split	20-yard split	20-yard shuttle	Three-cone drill	Vertical jump	Broad jump	Bench press
6 ft 0 in (1.83 m)	211 lb (96 kg)	30 in (0.76 m)	9 3/8 in (0.24 m)	6 ft 0 5/8 in (1.84 m)	4.61 s	1.57 s	2.69 s	4.27 s	6.90 s	33.0 in (0.84 m)	9 ft 4 in (2.84 m)	14 reps
All values from NFL Combine/Pro Day

On January 13, 2011, Sash decided to forgo his senior season to make himself eligible for the 2011 NFL draft. He was selected in the sixth round by the New York Giants and was a member of the Super Bowl XLVI championship squad. In July 2012, he was suspended for four games by the NFL after testing positive for Adderall, which is on the league's list of banned substances. Sash said in a statement that he took the drug legally and "under a doctor's care for an anxiety condition" to help him with public speaking. Sash was cut from the Giants on August 31, 2013.

== Death ==
On September 8, 2015, Sash was found dead in his Oskaloosa, Iowa, home around 8 a.m. local time. He was 27. The autopsy report concluded that his death was caused by a mixture of methadone and hydrocodone, both legal narcotics used to relieve severe pain. On January 26, 2016, five months after his death, Sash's family released the results of testing performed on his brain, confirming that he was suffering from stage 2 chronic traumatic encephalopathy (CTE), a degenerative brain disease caused by head injuries, at the time of his death. He is one of at least 345 NFL players to be diagnosed after death with this disease, which is caused by repeated hits to the head.
