= Amari Spievey =

American football player (born 1988)

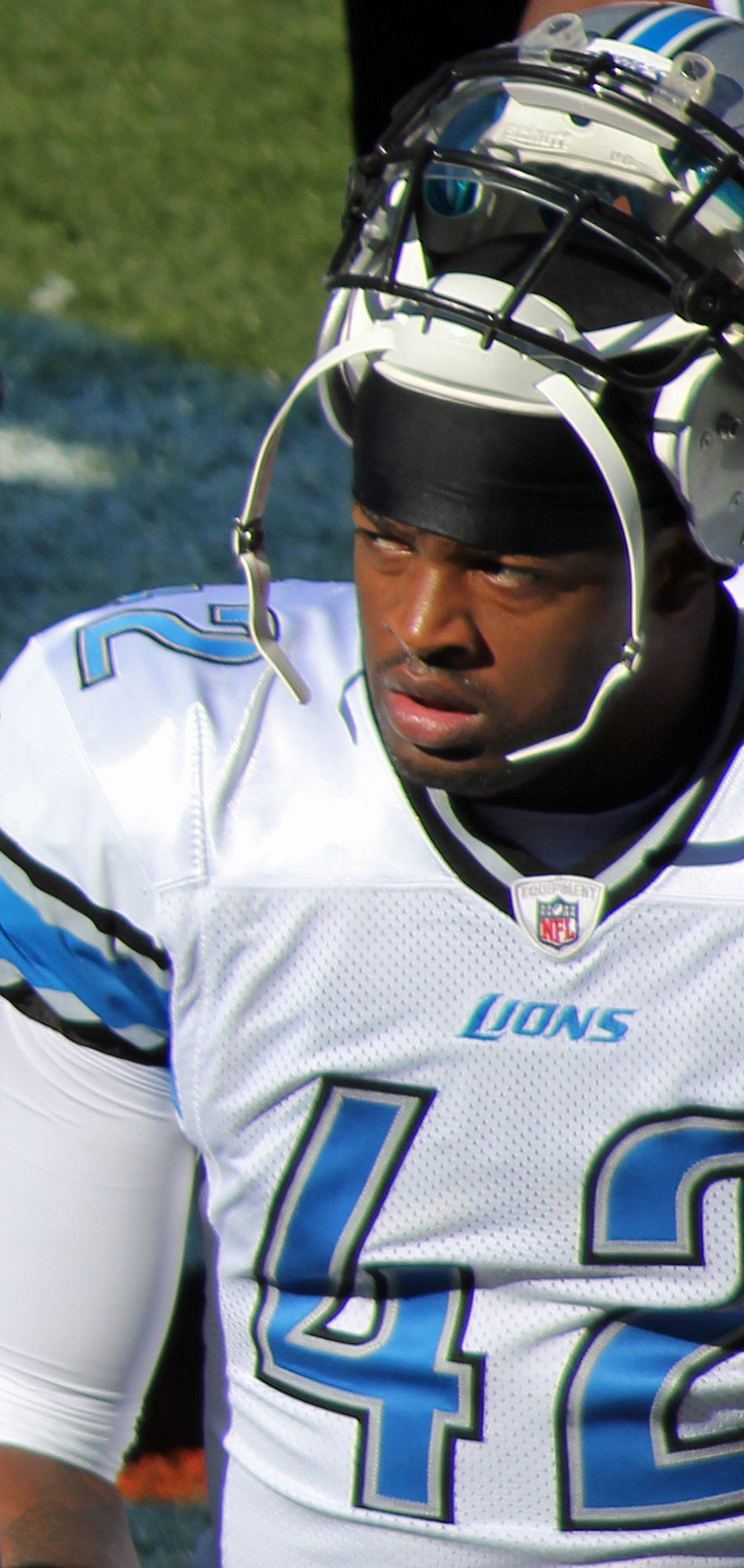
- Spievey with the Detroit Lions in 2011

No. 42
- Position: Safety

Personal information
- Born: April 15, 1988 (age 38); Middletown, Connecticut, U.S.
- Listed height: 5 ft 11 in (1.80 m)
- Listed weight: 195 lb (88 kg)

Career information
- High school: Xavier (Middletown)
- College: Iowa Central CC (2007) Iowa (2008–2009)
- NFL draft: 2010: 3rd round, 66th overall pick

Career history
- Detroit Lions (2010–2012)

Awards and highlights
- Junior College All-American (2007); First-team All-Big Ten (2009); Second-team All-Big Ten (2008)

Career NFL statistics
- Total tackles: 142
- Sacks: 1
- Fumble recoveries: 1
- Interceptions: 5
- Stats at Pro Football Reference

Amari Spievey (born April 15, 1988) is an American former professional football player who was a safety for the Detroit Lions of the National Football League (NFL). He played college football for the Iowa Hawkeyes. He was considered one of the top cornerback prospects for the 2010 NFL draft and was selected by the Lions in the third round.

== Early life ==
Spievey attended Xavier High School, where he played cornerback and running back, and finished his career as the all-time leading rusher in school history. He rushed for 3,606 yards and 50 touchdowns in his career, along with 53 receptions for 858 yards and eight touchdowns.

On defense, Spievey made 87 career tackles and 16 interceptions, including two returned for touchdowns. He was a two-time coaches all-state selection and was named the Connecticut Player of the Year as a senior in 2005, the year the team won the Class LL state championship.

Regarded as a two-star recruit by Rivals.com, Spievey was listed as the #15 prospect from New England.

== College career ==
=== Iowa Central Community College ===
Spievey redshirted his initial year at Iowa to preserve a year of eligibility. Spievey transferred to Iowa Central Community College after being academically ineligible for his sophomore season. There he recorded seven pass interceptions and 242 return yards. He returned two of those interceptions for touchdowns and also scored two touchdowns on kickoff returns and recorded four blocked punts. Iowa Central CC posted 9–2 overall record to earn a No. seven national ranking, and Spievey earned junior college All-American honors.

=== Iowa ===
In his redshirt sophomore season at Iowa, Spievey started all games at right cornerback and ranked third on the team with 68 tackles, including 43 solo tackles and 25 assists. He also had four pass interceptions and six pass break-ups. The Big Ten coaches named him Second-team All-Big Ten afterwards. The following year, he was named to the First-team.

== Professional career ==
Pre-draft measurables
Height	Weight	40-yard dash	Vertical jump	Broad jump
5 ft 11 in (1.80 m)	195 lb (88 kg)	4.52 s	35 in (0.89 m)	116 in (2.95 m)
All values from NFL Combine.

By mid-season of 2009, Sports Illustrated's Tony Pauline listed Spievey as one of the "risers" for the 2010 NFL draft. On January 11, 2010, Spievey announced that he would forgo his senior season and enter the NFL Draft. Spievey was selected by the Detroit Lions as the 2nd pick of the 3rd round (66th overall) of the 2010 NFL Draft.

Although he played cornerback in college, Spievey was moved to safety by the Lions to take advantage of his tackling ability and instincts.

Spievey opened the 2011 NFL season as a starter at safety for the Lions.

On August 31, 2013, he was released by the Lions.

=== NFL statistics ===
Year	Team	GP	COMB	TOTAL	AST	SACK	FF	FR	FR YDS	INT	IR YDS	AVG IR	LNG	TD	PD
2010	DET	15	51	37	14	0.0	0	0	0	2	35	18	26	0	3
2011	DET	15	70	62	8	1.0	0	1	0	3	47	16	30	0	4
2012	DET	5	21	18	3	0.0	0	0	0	0	0	0	0	0	0
Career		35	142	117	25	1.0	0	1	0	5	82	16	30	0	7
