= Garrett Graham =

American football player (born 1986)

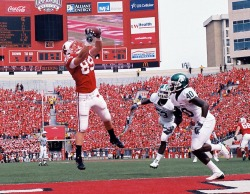
- Graham (89) while at Wisconsin

No. 80, 88
- Position: Tight end

Personal information
- Born: August 4, 1986 (age 40); Brick Township, New Jersey, U.S.
- Listed height: 6 ft 3 in (1.91 m)
- Listed weight: 243 lb (110 kg)

Career information
- High school: Memorial (Brick Township)
- College: Wisconsin (2005–2009)
- NFL draft: 2010: 4th round, 118th overall pick

Career history
- Houston Texans (2010–2015); Denver Broncos (2016)

Awards and highlights
- 2× First-team All-Big Ten (2008, 2009)

Career NFL statistics
- Receptions: 100
- Receiving yards: 1,059
- Receiving touchdowns: 10
- Stats at Pro Football Reference

Garrett Graham (born August 4, 1986) is an American former professional football player who was a tight end in the National Football League (NFL). He played college football for the Wisconsin Badgers and was selected by the Houston Texans in the fourth round of the 2010 NFL draft.

== Early life ==
Graham attended Brick Memorial High School in Brick Township, New Jersey. He was a tight end, defensive end, punter and kicker. He finished with 96 receptions for 2,031 yards and 21 touchdowns. He also was first-team all state 2 years in a row.

== College career ==
After being redshirted in 2005, Graham played in three games as a redshirt freshman in 2006 but did not have a reception. As a sophomore in 2007, Graham started 10 of 13 games recording 30 receptions for 328 yards and four touchdowns. As a junior in 2008, Graham started 10 of 11 games. He finished the season leading the team in receptions with 40, receiving yards with 540 and touchdowns with five.

Garrett finished his senior season with 51 receptions for 624 yards and seven touchdowns which led the team.

On November 23, 2009, Garrett Graham was selected 1st Team All-Big Ten tight end by the media and 2nd team by the coaches.

== Professional career ==
Pre-draft measurables
Height	Weight	Arm length	Hand span	40-yard dash	10-yard split	20-yard split	20-yard shuttle	Three-cone drill	Vertical jump	Broad jump	Bench press
6 ft 3 1/8 in (1.91 m)	243 lb (110 kg)	32 in (0.81 m)	9 1/2 in (0.24 m)	4.78 s	1.71 s	2.82 s	4.35 s	7.09 s	34.5 in (0.88 m)	9 ft 4 in (2.84 m)	20 reps
All values from NFL Combine

=== Houston Texans ===
Graham was selected in the fourth round with the 118th overall pick by the Houston Texans.

After seeing limited action in his first two seasons, Graham became the second-string tight end in the 2012 season. In week 11 against the Jacksonville Jaguars, Graham set career highs in receptions (8), yards (82), and touchdowns (2) in the 43–37 overtime win.

On March 13, 2014, Graham re-signed with the Texans on a three-year contract.

=== Denver Broncos ===
On April 25, 2016, Graham signed with the Denver Broncos.

On September 15, 2016, Graham was released by Denver due to a shoulder injury.

== Career statistics ==
=== NFL ===
Year	Team	Receptions	Yards	Average	TDs
2010	Houston Texans	0	0	0	0
2011	Houston Texans	1	24	24.0	0
2012	Houston Texans	28	263	9.4	3
2013	Houston Texans	49	545	11.1	5
2014	Houston Texans	18	197	10.9	1
2015	Houston Texans	4	30	7.5	1
Totals		100	1,059	10.6	10

=== College ===
Year	Team	Receptions	Yards	Average	TDs
2005	Wisconsin	Redshirt			
2006	Wisconsin	0	0	0.0	0
2007	Wisconsin	30	328	10.9	4
2008	Wisconsin	40	540	13.5	5
2009	Wisconsin	51	624	12.2	7
College totals		121	1,492	12.3	16
