= Sherrick McManis =

American football player (born 1987)

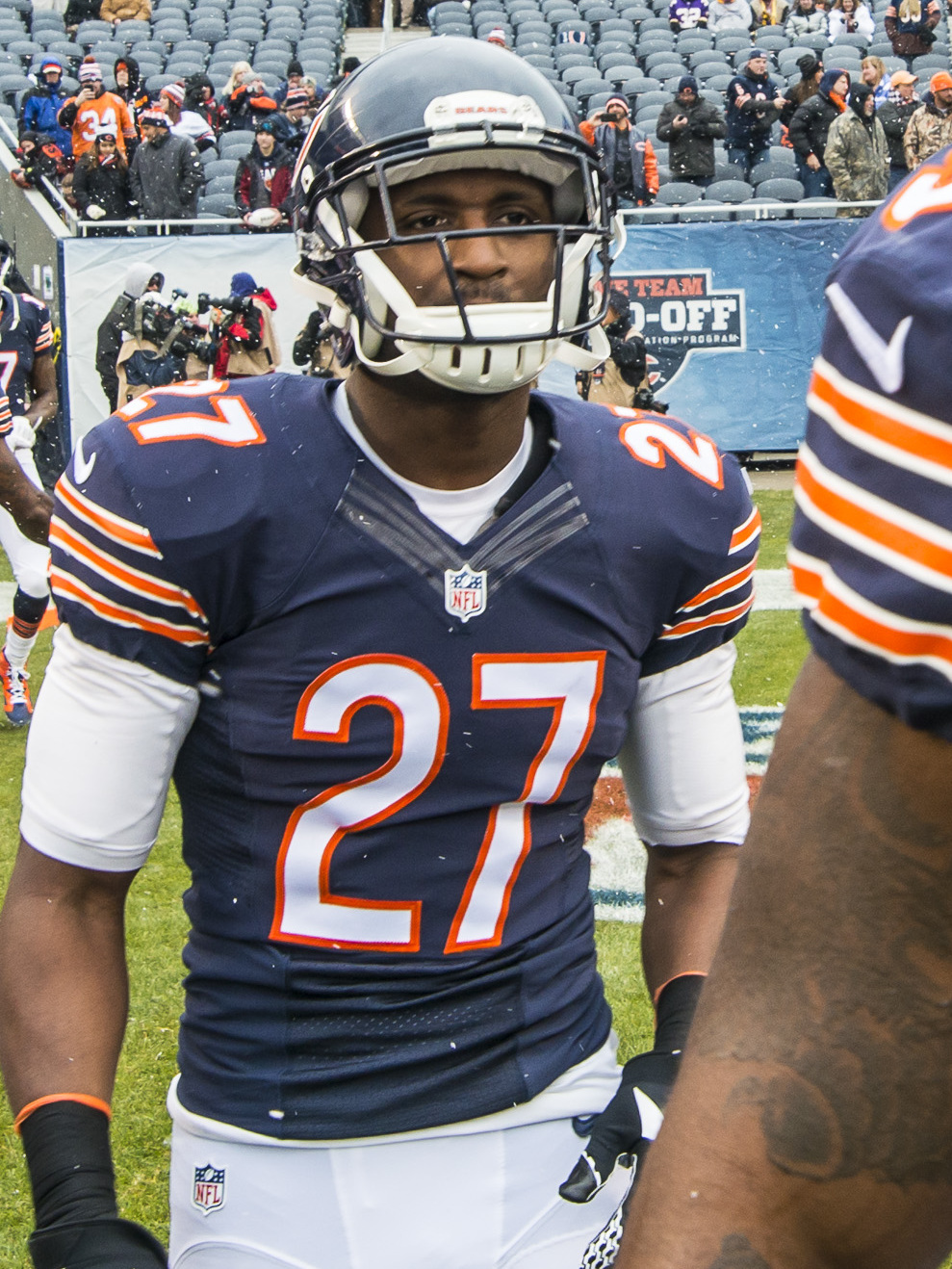
- McManis with the Chicago Bears in 2014

No. 22, 27
- Position: Cornerback

Personal information
- Born: December 19, 1987 (age 38); Peoria, Illinois, U.S.
- Listed height: 5 ft 11 in (1.80 m)
- Listed weight: 203 lb (92 kg)

Career information
- High school: Richwoods (Peoria)
- College: Northwestern
- NFL draft: 2010: 5th round, 144th overall pick

Career history
- Houston Texans (2010–2011); Chicago Bears (2012–2020)

Awards and highlights
- First-team All-Big Ten (2009); Sporting News freshman All-Big Ten (2006)

Career NFL statistics
- Total tackles: 154
- Sacks: 1.0
- Forced fumbles: 3
- Fumble recoveries: 4
- Pass deflections: 8
- Interceptions: 3
- Stats at Pro Football Reference

Sherrick Terravis McManis (born December 19, 1987) is an American former professional football player who was a cornerback and special teamer for 11 seasons in the National Football League (NFL). He played college football for the Northwestern Wildcats and was selected by the Houston Texans in the fifth round of the 2010 NFL draft. He spent most of his career with the Chicago Bears.

== Early life ==
McManis attended Richwoods High School in Peoria, Illinois, where he played football and was a state champion long-jumper. Considered only a two-star recruit by Rivals.com, McManis chose Northwestern over Eastern Illinois, Western Illinois, and Illinois State.

== College career ==
As a freshman, McManis was named to Sporting News' freshman All-Big Ten team after recording 21 tackles, breaking up six passes and making one interception. As a sophomore, he became a full-time starter on defense, and recorded 75 tackles, 6.5 tackles-for-loss, seven pass break-ups, and one interception. As a junior, he recorded 53 tackles, broke up 14 passes and had two interceptions. As a senior, he earned first-team All-Big Ten honors after he set career highs in interceptions with five, and recorded 37 tackles, 1.5 tackles-for-loss, and broke up 12 passes. He finished his collegiate career with 201 tackles, eight tackles-for-loss, 39 pass break-ups, and nine interceptions.

== Professional career ==
=== Houston Texans ===
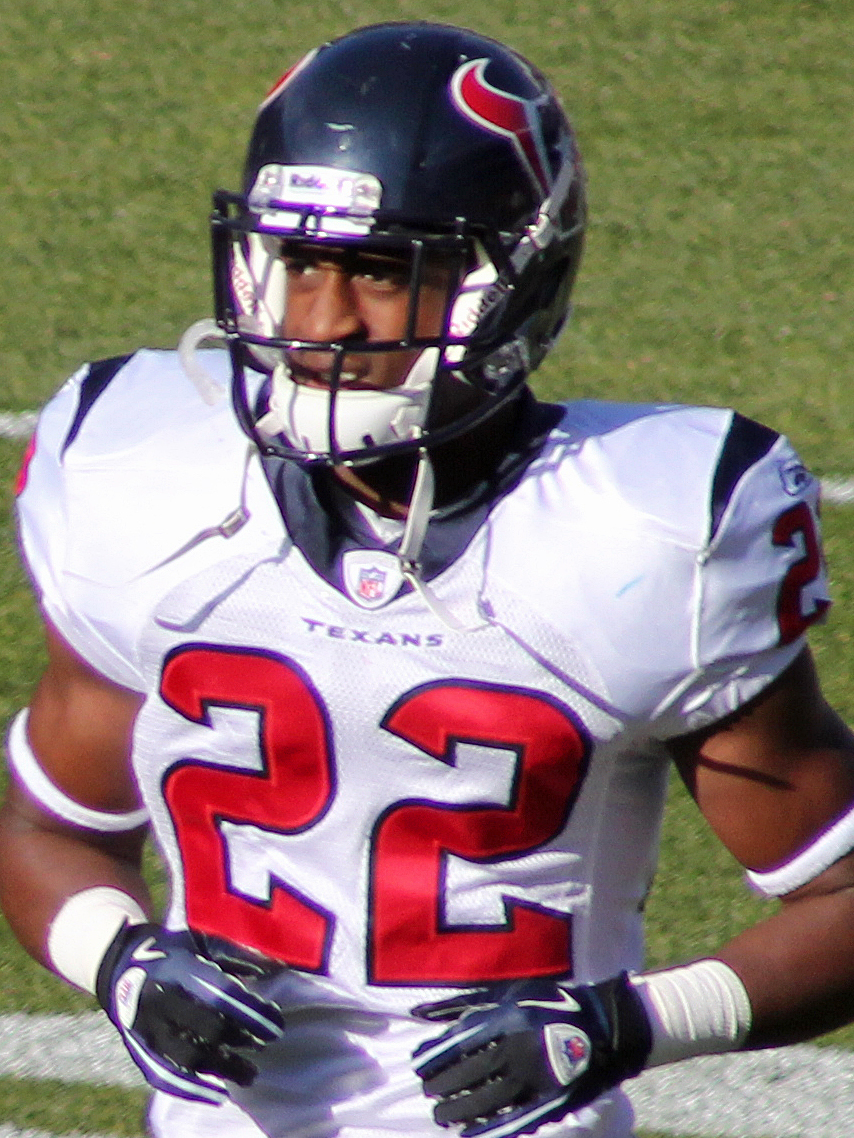
McManis with the Houston Texans in 2010

McManis was selected by the Houston Texans in the fifth round (144th overall) of the 2010 NFL draft. He signed a four-year, $1.982 million contract with the Texans on May 27.

=== Chicago Bears ===
On August 31, 2012, McManis was traded to the Chicago Bears for fullback Tyler Clutts. In Week 9 against the Tennessee Titans, McManis blocked Brett Kern's punt, which was recovered by former Northwestern teammate Corey Wootton, who returned the blocked punt for a touchdown. McManis was eventually named the NFC Special Teams Player of the Week. McManis was placed on injured reserve on December 11. In the 2015 season, McManis had 11 special-teams tackles, which led the team.

On March 10, 2016, McManis was re-signed by the Bears to a two-year contract.

On March 22, 2018, McManis signed a two-year contract to remain with the Bears. Since 2012, McManis has been Chicago's special teams ace, spending time as a captain while making 80 tackles in that time entering the 2018 season. In Week 3 against the Arizona Cardinals, McManis recorded his first interception since 2010 off Sam Bradford's pass to Chad Williams. Later in the season, he became the Bears' starting nickelback after Bryce Callahan suffered a season-ending foot injury. He ultimately started the Bears playoff game against the Eagles and gave up the game winning touchdown.

In week 5 of the 2019 season against the Oakland Raiders, McManis forced a fumble on Trevor Davis on the goal line in the 24–21 loss. He was placed on injured reserve on November 30, 2019.

McManis signed a one-year extension with the Bears on April 16, 2020. During the 2020 season, McManis became the longest tenured Bears player, having played under four different coaching regimes dating back to Lovie Smith in 2012. In Week 15 against the Minnesota Vikings, McManis intercepted a pass thrown by Kirk Cousins with no time left in the game to secure a 33–27 win for the Bears. Following the conclusion of the 2020 season, McManis was not re-signed by the Bears and entered free agency where he went unsigned.

== NFL career statistics ==
Legend
**Bold**	Career high

=== Regular season ===
Year	Team	Games		Tackles					Interceptions					Fumbles			
Year	Team	GP	GS	Cmb	Solo	Ast	Sck	TFL	Int	Yds	TD	Lng	PD	FF	FR	Yds	TD
2010	HOU	14	0	13	9	4	0.0	0	**1**	**1**	0	**1**	1	0	0	0	0
2011	HOU	9	0	5	4	1	0.0	0	0	0	0	0	0	**1**	0	0	0
2012	CHI	12	0	7	4	3	0.0	0	0	0	0	0	0	0	**1**	0	0
2013	CHI	15	1	10	8	2	0.0	0	0	0	0	0	1	0	0	0	0
2014	CHI	12	0	12	10	2	0.0	0	0	0	0	0	0	0	**1**	0	0
2015	CHI	**16**	**4**	**29**	23	**6**	0.0	0	0	0	0	0	0	0	0	0	0
2016	CHI	**16**	0	16	15	1	0.0	0	0	0	0	0	0	0	0	0	0
2017	CHI	13	0	13	8	5	0.0	0	0	0	0	0	0	0	**1**	0	0
2018	CHI	15	0	26	**24**	2	**1.0**	**2**	**1**	0	0	0	**4**	0	0	0	0
2019	CHI	9	0	11	9	2	0.0	0	0	0	0	0	1	**1**	0	0	0
2020	CHI	11	0	12	11	1	0.0	0	**1**	0	0	0	1	**1**	**1**	0	0
		142	5	154	125	29	1.0	2	3	1	0	1	8	3	4	0	0

=== Playoffs ===
Year	Team	Games		Tackles					Interceptions					Fumbles			
Year	Team	GP	GS	Cmb	Solo	Ast	Sck	TFL	Int	Yds	TD	Lng	PD	FF	FR	Yds	TD
2011	HOU	**2**	0	1	0	**1**	0.0	0	0	0	0	0	0	0	0	0	0
2018	CHI	1	**1**	**3**	**2**	**1**	0.0	**1**	0	0	0	0	**3**	0	0	0	0
2020	CHI	1	0	0	0	0	0.0	0	0	0	0	0	0	0	0	0	0
		4	1	4	2	2	0.0	1	0	0	0	0	3	0	0	0	0
