= Ray Fisher (cornerback) =

American gridiron football player (born 1987)

No. 7
- Position: Wide receiver

Personal information
- Born: September 12, 1987 (age 39); Cleveland, Ohio, U.S.
- Listed height: 5 ft 9 in (1.75 m)
- Listed weight: 185 lb (84 kg)

Career information
- High school: Glenville (Cleveland)
- College: Indiana
- NFL draft: 2010: 7th round, 246th overall pick

Career history
- Indianapolis Colts (2010)*; Edmonton Eskimos (2011); Cleveland Gladiators (2012)*
- * Offseason or practice squad member only

Awards and highlights
- FBS kickoff return average leader (2009)
- Stats at ArenaFan.com

Ray Fisher (born September 12, 1987) is an American former professional football wide receiver. He was selected by the Indianapolis Colts in the seventh round of the 2010 NFL draft but did not make the team after the 2010 preseason. He played college football for the Indiana Hoosiers and high school football at Glenville High School.

Fisher is the Big Ten Conference single-season record holder and the 2009 NCAA Division I FBS football season statistical champion for kickoff return average.

== Early life ==
Fisher graduated from Glenville High School in Cleveland, Ohio, in May 2005. While attending, he lettered in football, basketball and track. Fisher played wide receiver and defensive back for head coach Ted Ginn, Sr. Fisher missed all of his senior season due to injury, but recorded 1,120 all-purpose yards and 13 touchdowns as a junior and picked off four passes. He garnered Northeast Lakes All-District honors as a junior and earned a spot on the ESPN.com Class of 2006 Wide Receivers to Watch List. He was a 300 huddler with his fastest time of 37.2 and on the record breaking 4x200 relay team with a time of 125.4 Fisher with a lead off time of 20.6. Fisher was a part of four state championship winning teams. He was widely recruited while in high school. Due to a torn ACL he did not play his senior year of high school.

== College career ==
Fisher attended Indiana University Bloomington in Bloomington, Indiana, as a general studies major. He began his career at Indiana as a wide receiver, but was moved to cornerback his senior year. In his freshman year he played in eleven games, starting one. Fisher finished his freshman year with 24 receptions for 215 yards two touchdowns. Receiving freshman all-American. In his sophomore year he played in twelve games, finishing with 42 receptions for 482 yards and eight touchdowns. Fisher had his first 100-yard game with 106 yards against the University of Minnesota and a career-high 171 yards and three touchdowns against Ball State. In his junior year, Fisher led the team with 42 receptions for 749 yards and ten touchdowns. In his senior season, Fisher was moved to cornerback and saw more time at punt and kick returner. Fisher saw six starts and played in eight games before suffering a season-ending injury in a game against the University of Iowa. He received All-Big Ten honorable mention from the conference coaches and media. Fisher made 40 tackles, 38 solo, with one forced fumble, one fumble recovery returned for 26 yards as well as two pass breakups. As a returner, Fisher returned 17 kickoffs for 635 yards (37.7 average), with four touchdowns and six punts for 59 yards (9.8 average). He became the second kick returner in IU history to return two kicks for touchdowns, the first being former running back Marcus Thigpen. Fisher's kick return average led the nation during the 2009 football season, set a Big Ten Conference single-season average and broke Thigpen's previous school mark for season average of 30.1 set in 2006. He had a career best 35-yard punt return against Northwestern University and became the first IU player to return the opening kick-off for a touchdown in a game against the University of Akron. Fisher had a career-high eight tackles, seven solo, with one pass breakup in a win over Western Michigan University. He earned the Hoosier Big Play Maker Award on special teams and was a five-time IU special teams player of the week. Fisher also holds the record for the fastest 40 time ever with a time of 4.27 in the spring going into his senior year.

Fisher led the Football Bowl Subdivision in kickoff return average for the 2009 NCAA Division I FBS football season with a 37.35 average on 17 returns. The 37.35 average exceeded the previous Big Ten Conference single-season record of 34.3 that Thomas Barrington set for the Ohio State Buckeyes in 1965.

== Professional career ==
Fisher was selected 246th overall by the Colts in the seventh round of the 2010 NFL draft. He was waived September 4, 2010. Fisher later signed with the Edmonton Eskimos of the Canadian Football League and played for them during the 2011 season. Fisher started at wide receiver and shared time as a returner. He was released in the middle of the season due to a knee injury.
