= Rodger Saffold =

American football player (born 1988)

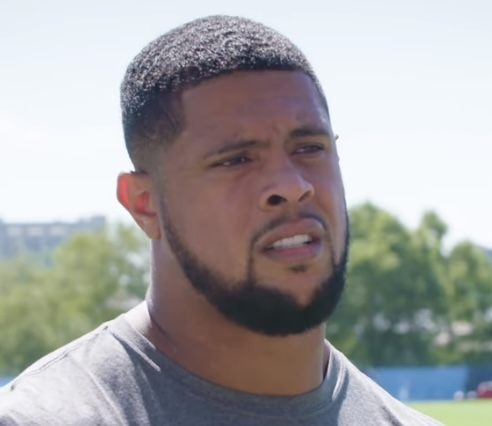
- Saffold in 2021

No. 76
- Position: Guard

Personal information
- Born: June 6, 1988 (age 38); Bedford, Ohio, U.S.
- Listed height: 6 ft 5 in (1.96 m)
- Listed weight: 325 lb (147 kg)

Career information
- High school: Bedford
- College: Indiana (2006–2009)
- NFL draft: 2010: 2nd round, 33rd overall pick

Career history
- St. Louis / Los Angeles Rams (2010–2018); Tennessee Titans (2019–2021); Buffalo Bills (2022); New York Jets (2023)*; Cleveland Browns (2023)*
- * Offseason or practice squad member only

Awards and highlights
- Second-team All-Pro (2017); 2× Pro Bowl (2021, 2022); PFWA All-Rookie Team (2010); Built Ford Tough Offensive Line of the Year (2018); Second-team All-Big Ten (2009)

Career NFL statistics
- Games played: 176
- Games started: 173
- Stats at Pro Football Reference

Rodger P. Saffold III (born June 6, 1988) is an American former professional football player who played as a guard in the National Football League (NFL). He was selected by the St. Louis Rams in the second round, 33rd overall in the 2010 NFL draft. He played college football for the Indiana Hoosiers.

== Early life ==
Saffold attended Bedford High School in Bedford, Ohio where he played offensive tackle and defensive end. He was a 2005 first team All-Lake Erie League, all-district and honorable mention all-state selection at the same high school that produced former Wisconsin and NFL wide receivers Chris Chambers and Lee Evans. He recorded 18 tackles as a senior.

Considered only a two-star recruit by Rivals.com, Saffold picked Indiana over Illinois, Kansas and Ohio.

== College career ==
He never left the starting lineup after sliding in at left tackle midway through his true freshman campaign at Indiana University. He started 41 games and appeared in 42 in his career. He was selected second team All-Big Ten by the conference coaches and named honorable mention by the league's media, and earned second team All-Big Ten recognition from Phil Steele's magazine.

== Professional career ==
Pre-draft measurables
Height	Weight	Arm length	Hand span	40-yard dash	10-yard split	20-yard split	20-yard shuttle	Three-cone drill	Vertical jump	Broad jump	Bench press	Wonderlic
6 ft 4 5/8 in (1.95 m)	316 lb (143 kg)	33 5/8 in (0.85 m)	9 3/8 in (0.24 m)	5.25 s	1.81 s	3.03 s	4.67 s	7.42 s	29 1/2 in (0.75 m)	9 ft 5 in (2.87 m)	27 reps	x
All values from NFL Combine

=== St. Louis / Los Angeles Rams ===
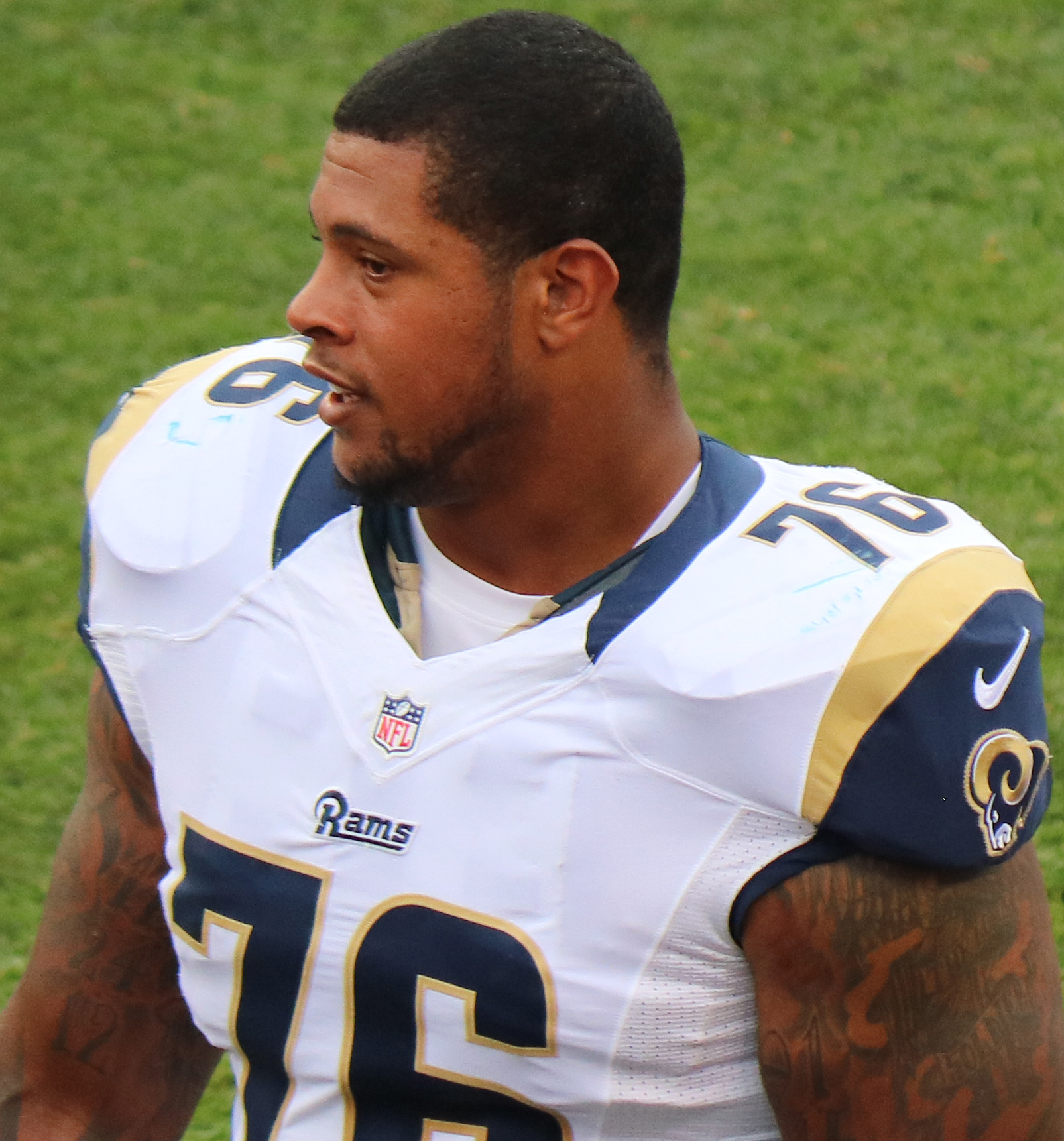
Saffold with the Los Angeles Rams in 2016

Saffold was selected by the St. Louis Rams in the second round, 33rd overall, in the 2010 NFL draft. On July 28, 2010, he signed a 4-year contract worth $6.3 million, that included $3.9 million guaranteed. Saffold earned the starting left tackle position for the Rams in his rookie season and started in every game that season for the Rams. Saffold garnered rave reviews for his play and was named to multiple All Rookie teams, including Pro Football Weekly and the Sporting News.

Saffold was the only rookie in 2010 to start all their team's games at left tackle and Saffold allowed only three sacks in 590 pass attempts according to Statspass.com as he helped Steven Jackson rush for over 1,000 yards. In 2011, he played in and started 9 games at left tackle before being put on IR on November 19, 2011. In 2012 Saffold returned and played in and started the last 10 games of the season at left tackle. In 2013 Saffold played in 12 games with 9 starts, and moved around the offensive line with 1 start at left tackle, 3 starts at right tackle, and 5 starts at right guard. In 2014, Saffold played in and started all 16 games mostly at left guard, but also started at right guard and saw some action at right tackle too. In 2015, Saffold played in and started 5 games at right guard. In 2016, Saffold has started in and played all 11 games at the guard position.

Saffold signed a five-year, $42.5 million contract with the Oakland Raiders on March 11, 2014. However, after a disagreement in Oakland on Saffold's physical condition, he returned to the Rams to sign a five-year, $31.7 million contract. The Raiders had concerns about Saffold's shoulder, which contrasted with the Rams who had "no concerns whatsoever". Saffold received an overall grade of 73.7 from Pro Football Focus, which ranked as the seventh best grade among all qualified offensive guards in 2018. In 2018, Saffold helped the Rams reach Super Bowl LIII where they lost to the New England Patriots 13–3.

=== Tennessee Titans ===
On March 14, 2019, Saffold signed with the Tennessee Titans on a four-year $44 million contract.

In 2019, Saffold started all 16 games with the Titans as they finished the season 9–7 and made the playoffs, blocking for Derrick Henry as he won the league rushing yards title. He then started all three of the Titans playoff games, blocking for Henry as he ran for nearly 200 yards in each of the first two games before losing to the eventual Super Bowl champions Kansas City Chiefs in the AFC Championship.

In 2020, Saffold remained the starting left guard, starting all 16 games and blocked for Henry who won his second rushing yards title and he was named Offensive Player of the Year by becoming the eighth player in NFL history to rush for 2000 yards in a season. The Titans won the division with an 11–5 record. Saffold started for the Titans in the wildcard round of the playoffs where they were defeated by the Baltimore Ravens.

On March 10, 2022, Saffold was released by the Titans.

=== Buffalo Bills ===
On March 14, 2022, Saffold signed a one-year contract with the Buffalo Bills. On January 30, 2023, Saffold was selected to his second Pro Bowl as an alternate.

=== New York Jets ===
On October 31, 2023, Saffold was signed to the New York Jets practice squad. He was released on January 2, 2024.

=== Cleveland Browns ===
On January 3, 2024, Saffold was signed to the Cleveland Browns practice squad. He was not signed to a reserve/future contract by the team after the season and thus became a free agent upon the expiration of his practice squad contract.

== Esports involvement ==
Saffold is currently the owner of competitive Call of Duty team Rise Nation. He bought the team in April 2014.
