= Jammie Kirlew =

American gridiron football player (born 1987)

No. 49, 59
- Position: Linebacker

Personal information
- Born: May 12, 1987 (age 39); Orlando, Florida, U.S.
- Listed height: 6 ft 3 in (1.91 m)
- Listed weight: 260 lb (118 kg)

Career information
- High school: Cypress Creek (Orlando)
- College: Indiana
- NFL draft: 2010: 7th round, 232nd overall pick

Career history
- Denver Broncos (2010)*; Buffalo Bills (2010–2011)*; Jacksonville Jaguars (2011); Saskatchewan Roughriders (2013)*; Berlin Rebels (2013); Tampa Bay Storm (2014)
- * Offseason or practice squad member only

Awards and highlights
- Second-team All-Big Ten (2009)

Career AFL statistics
- Total tackles: 23
- Sacks: 3.5
- Forced fumbles: 3
- Stats at ArenaFan.com
- Stats at Pro Football Reference

Jammie Kirlew (born May 12, 1987) is an American former professional football player who was a linebacker in the National Football League (NFL). He played college football for the Indiana Hoosiers. He was selected 232nd overall by the Denver Broncos in the seventh round of the 2010 NFL draft.

Kirlew graduated with degrees in SPEA management and public financial management in December 2009. The two-time All-Big Ten selection and two-time team MVP closed out his career tied for third on the Hoosiers' career sacks list with 23 and second on the career tackles for loss list with 52.5. Kirlew played in 48 career games with 41 starts. He collected 220 tackles, 152 solo, with nine forced fumbles and six fumble recoveries.

Kirlew was also a member of the Buffalo Bills, Jacksonville Jaguars, Saskatchewan Roughriders, Berlin Rebels and Tampa Bay Storm.

== Professional career ==
On December 9, 2011, Kirlew was signed to the practice squad of the Jaguars. On December 27, 2011, Kirlew was promoted to the active roster. He was cut by the Jaguars on April 27, 2012.

He was signed by the Saskatchewan Roughriders on February 6, 2013. He was subsequently released on April 19, 2013, without playing a single game with the Roughriders.

On April 22, Kirlew signed as a defensive lineman with the Berlin Rebels of the German Football League (GFL).

On February 6, 2014, Kirlew was assigned to the Tampa Bay Storm of the Arena Football League (AFL).
