= Iowa Hawkeyes football statistical leaders =

The Iowa Hawkeyes football statistical leaders are individual statistical leaders of the Iowa Hawkeyes football program in various categories, including passing, rushing, receiving, total offense, defensive stats, and kicking. Within those areas, the lists identify single-game, single-season, and career leaders. The Hawkeyes represent the University of Iowa.

Although Iowa began competing in intercollegiate football in 1889, the school's official record book considers the "modern era" to have begun in 1939. Records from before this year are often incomplete and inconsistent, and they are generally not included in these lists.

These lists are dominated by more recent players for several reasons:

- Since 1939, seasons have increased from 8 games to 12 games in length.
- The NCAA did not allow freshmen to play varsity football until 1972 (with the exception of the World War II years), allowing players to have four-year careers.
- Bowl games only began counting toward single-season and career statistics in 2002. The Hawkeyes have played in 16 bowl games since then, allowing recent players an extra game to accumulate statistics.
- The Big Ten has held a championship game since 2011. The Hawkeyes have played in this game three times (2015, 2021, and 2023), giving players in those seasons yet another game to amass statistics.
- Due to COVID-19 issues, the NCAA ruled that the 2020 season would not count against the athletic eligibility of any football player, giving everyone who played in that season the opportunity for five years of eligibility instead of the normal four.

Statistics are current through the game on November 7, 2026. Performances from the 2026 season are shown in bold.

== Passing ==
=== Passing yards ===
Career
Rank	Player	Yards	Years
1	Chuck Long	10,461	1981 1982 1983 1984 1985
2	Nate Stanley	8,302	2016 2017 2018 2019
3	Drew Tate	8,292	2003 2004 2005 2006
4	Ricky Stanzi	7,377	2007 2008 2009 2010
5	Chuck Hartlieb	6,934	1986 1987 1988
6	Matt Rodgers	6,725	1988 1989 1990 1991
7	Matt Sherman	6,399	1994 1995 1996 1997
8	James Vandenberg	5,786	2009 2010 2011 2012
9	C. J. Beathard	5,562	2013 2014 2015 2016
10	Spencer Petras	5,199	2019 2020 2021 2022

Single season
Rank	Player	Yards	Year
1	Chuck Hartlieb	3,738	1988
2	Chuck Long	3,297	1985
3	Chuck Hartlieb	3,092	1987
4	James Vandenberg	3,022	2011
5	Ricky Stanzi	3,004	2010
6	Nate Stanley	2,951	2019
7	Chuck Long	2,871	1984
8	Nate Stanley	2,852	2018
9	Drew Tate	2,828	2005
10	C. J. Beathard	2,809	2015

Single game
Rank	Player	Yards	Year	Opponent
1	Chuck Hartlieb	558	1988	Indiana
2	Chuck Hartlieb	471	1987	Northwestern
3	Chuck Long	461	1984	Texas
4	Chuck Hartlieb	428	1988	NC State
5	Scott Mullen	426	1999	Indiana
6	Chuck Long	420	1983	Northwestern
7	Chuck Long	399	1985	Northwestern
	James Vandenberg	399	2011	Pittsburgh
9	Chuck Long	380	1985	Michigan State
	Jon Beutjer	380	2000	Indiana

=== Passing touchdowns ===
Career
Rank	Player	TDs	Years
1	Chuck Long	74	1981 1982 1983 1984 1985
2	Nate Stanley	68	2016 2017 2018 2019
3	Drew Tate	61	2003 2004 2005 2006
4	Ricky Stanzi	56	2007 2008 2009 2010
5	Matt Sherman	43	1994 1995 1996 1997
6	Matt Rodgers	41	1988 1989 1990 1991
7	C. J. Beathard	40	2013 2014 2015 2016
8	Chuck Hartlieb	37	1986 1987 1988
9	James Vandenberg	35	2009 2010 2011 2012
10	Jake Rudock	34	2012 2013 2014

Single season
Rank	Player	TDs	Year
1	Chuck Long	27	1985
2	Brad Banks	26	2002
	Nate Stanley	26	2017
	Nate Stanley	26	2018
5	Ricky Stanzi	25	2010
	James Vandenberg	25	2011
7	Chuck Long	22	1984
	Drew Tate	22	2005
9	Drew Tate	20	2004
10	Chuck Hartlieb	19	1987

Single game
Rank	Player	TDs	Year	Opponent
1	Chuck Hartlieb	7	1987	Northwestern
2	Chuck Long	6	1984	Texas
	Chuck Long	6	1985	Northwestern
	Nate Stanley	6	2018	Indiana
5	Chuck Long	5	1985	Northern Illinois
	Nate Stanley	5	2017	Iowa State
	Nate Stanley	5	2017	Ohio State
8	Chuck Long	4	1983	Wisconsin
	Chuck Long	4	1984	Iowa State
	Chuck Long	4	1984	Purdue
	Chuck Long	4	1985	Michigan State
	Chuck Long	4	1985	Illinois
	Jon Beutjer	4	2000	Indiana
	Drew Tate	4	2005	Minnesota
	Ricky Stanzi	4	2009	Iowa State
	James Vandenberg	4	2011	Indiana
	Nate Stanley	4	2018	Minnesota

== Rushing ==
=== Rushing yards ===
Career
Rank	Player	Yards	Years
1	Sedrick Shaw	4,156	1993 1994 1995 1996
2	Ladell Betts	3,686	1998 1999 2000 2001
3	Albert Young	3,173	2004 2005 2006 2007
4	Tavian Banks	2,977	1994 1995 1996 1997
5	Akrum Wadley	2,872	2014 2015 2016 2017
6	Kaleb Johnson	2,779	2022 2023 2024
7	Fred Russell	2,760	2001 2002 2003
8	Mark Weisman	2,602	2012 2013 2014
9	Tony Stewart	2,562	1987 1988 1989 1990
10	Owen Gill	2,556	1981 1982 1983 1984

Single season
Rank	Player	Yards	Year
1	Shonn Greene	1,850	2008
2	Tavian Banks	1,691	1997
3	Kaleb Johnson	1,537	2024
4	Sedrick Shaw	1,477	1995
5	Marcus Coker	1,384	2011
6	Fred Russell	1,355	2003
7	Albert Young	1,334	2005
8	Dennis Mosley	1,267	1979
9	Fred Russell	1,264	2002
10	Ronnie Harmon	1,166	1985

Single game
Rank	Player	Yards	Year	Opponent
1	Tavian Banks	314	1997	Tulsa
2	Ed Podolak	286	1968	Northwestern
3	Jordan Canzeri	256	2015	Illinois
4	Marcus Coker	252	2011	Minnesota
5	Sedrick Shaw	250	1995	Michigan State
6	Phil Blatcher	247	1981	Michigan State
7	Dennis Mosley	229	1979	Iowa State
8	Marcus Coker	219	2010	Missouri
9	Nick Bell	217	1989	Wisconsin
	Shonn Greene	217	2008	Wisconsin
	Mark Weisman	217	2012	Central Michigan

=== Rushing touchdowns ===
Career
Rank	Player	TDs	Years
1	Sedrick Shaw	33	1993 1994 1995 1996
	Tavian Banks	33	1994 1995 1996 1997
3	Mark Weisman	32	2012 2013 2014
4	Kaleb Johnson	30	2022 2023 2024
5	Akrum Wadley	28	2014 2015 2016 2017
6	Ladell Betts	25	1998 1999 2000 2001
7	David Hudson	24	1985 1986 1987 1988
8	Albert Young	23	2004 2005 2006 2007
9	Owen Gill	22	1981 1982 1983 1984
	Ronnie Harmon	22	1982 1983 1984 1985
	Shonn Greene	22	2005 2006 2008

Single season
Rank	Player	TDs	Year
1	Kaleb Johnson	21	2024
2	Shonn Greene	20	2008
3	Tavian Banks	17	1997
4	Mark Weisman	16	2014
	Mark Gronowski	16	2025
6	Sedrick Shaw	15	1995
	Marcus Coker	15	2011
8	Dennis Mosley	12	1979
	Nick Bell	12	1990
	Jordan Canzeri	12	2015

Single game
Rank	Player	TDs	Year	Opponent
1	Larry Lawrence	4	1968	Minnesota
	Owen Gill	4	1983	Iowa State
	Tavian Banks	4	1997	Tulsa
	Tavian Banks	4	1997	Iowa State
	Shonn Greene	4	2008	Wisconsin
	Jordan Canzeri	4	2015	North Texas
	Akrum Wadley	4	2015	Northwestern

== Receiving ==
=== Receptions ===
Career
Rank	Player	Rec	Years
1	Kevonte Martin-Manley	174	2011 2012 2013 2014
2	Derrell Johnson-Koulianos	173	2007 2008 2009 2010
3	Marvin McNutt	170	2008 2009 2010 2011
4	Kevin Kasper	157	1997 1998 1999 2000
5	Nico Ragaini	156	2018 2019 2020 2021 2022 2023
6	Sam LaPorta	153	2019 2020 2021 2022
7	Kahlil Hill	152	1998 1999 2000 2001
8	Ronnie Harmon	146	1982 1983 1984 1985
	Danan Hughes	146	1989 1990 1991 1992
10	Tim Dwight	139	1994 1995 1996 1997

Single season
Rank	Player	Rec	Year
1	Kevin Kasper	82	2000
	Marvin McNutt	82	2011
3	Matt VandeBerg	65	2015
4	Keith Chappelle	64	1980
5	Quinn Early	63	1987
	Marv Cook	63	1988
	Ed Hinkel	63	2004
8	Ronnie Harmon	60	1985
	Kevin Kasper	60	1999
10	Karl Noonan	59	1964
	Kahlil Hill	59	2001

Single game
Rank	Player	Rec	Year	Opponent
1	Nick Bell	13	1990	Indiana
	Kevin Kasper	13	1999	Ohio State
3	Al Bream	12	1967	Illinois
	Keith Chappelle	12	1980	Illinois
5	Dave Moritz	11	1983	Indiana
	Deven Harberts	11	1988	Indiana
7	Karl Noonan	10	1964	Wisconsin
	Quinn Early	10	1987	Northwestern

=== Receiving yards ===
Career
Rank	Player	Yards	Years
1	Marvin McNutt	2,861	2008 2009 2010 2011
2	Derrell Johnson-Koulianos	2,616	2007 2008 2009 2010
3	Tim Dwight	2,271	1994 1995 1996 1997
4	Danan Hughes	2,216	1989 1990 1991 1992
5	Ronnie Harmon	2,045	1982 1983 1984 1985
6	Kevin Kasper	1,974	1997 1998 1999 2000
7	Dave Moritz	1,912	1980 1981 1982 1983
8	Kahlil Hill	1,892	1998 1999 2000 2001
9	Clinton Solomon	1,864	2002 2004 2005
10	Harold Jasper	1,863	1991 1992 1993 1994

Single season
Rank	Player	Yards	Year
1	Marvin McNutt	1,315	2011
2	Keith Chappelle	1,037	1980
3	Kevin Kasper	1,010	2000
4	Quinn Early	1,004	1987
5	Maurice Brown	966	2002
6	Karl Noonan	933	1964
7	Dave Moritz	912	1983
8	Clinton Solomon	905	2004
9	Bill Happel	901	1985
10	Deven Harberts	880	1988

Single game
Rank	Player	Yards	Year	Opponent
1	Quinn Early	256	1987	Northwestern
2	Deven Harberts	233	1988	Indiana
3	Bill Happel	207	1985	Northern Illinois
4	Dave Moritz	192	1983	Indiana
5	Keith Chappelle	191	1980	Illinois
6	Tim Dwight	188	1996	Northwestern
7	Tim Dwight	187	1997	Iowa State
8	Marvin McNutt	184	2011	Indiana
9	Derrell Johnson-Koulianos	181	2008	Minnesota
10	Dave Moritz	168	1982	Tennessee

=== Receiving touchdowns ===
Career
Rank	Player	TDs	Years
1	Marvin McNutt	28	2008 2009 2010 2011
2	Danan Hughes	21	1989 1990 1991 1992
	Tim Dwight	21	1994 1995 1996 1997
4	Noah Fant	19	2016 2017 2018
5	Derrell Johnson-Koulianos	17	2007 2008 2009 2010
6	Robert Smith	16	1983 1984 1985 1986
	Ed Hinkel	16	2002 2003 2004 2005
8	Kahlil Hill	15	1998 1999 2000 2001
	Maurice Brown	15	2000 2001 2002 2003
10	Clinton Solomon	14	2002 2004 2005
	Ihmir Smith-Marsette	14	2017 2018 2019 2020

Single season
Rank	Player	TDs	Year
1	Marvin McNutt	12	2011
2	Maurice Brown	11	2002
	Noah Fant	11	2017
4	Quinn Early	10	1987
	Derrell Johnson-Koulianos	10	2010
6	Tim Dwight	9	1995
	C. J. Jones	9	2002
8	Bill Happel	8	1985
	Danan Hughes	8	1991
	Kahlil Hill	8	2001
	Tim Dwight	8	1997
	Marvin McNutt	8	2009
	Marvin McNutt	8	2010

Single game
Rank	Player	TDs	Year	Opponent
1	Quinn Early	4	1987	Northwestern
	Ed Hinkel	4	2005	Minnesota
3	Emlen Tunnell	3	1947	Indiana
	Bill Happel	3	1985	Northern Illinois
	Jim Mauro	3	1986	Iowa State
	Tim Dwight	3	1997	Iowa State
	Derrell Johnson-Koulianos	3	2010	Michigan
	Marvin McNutt	3	2011	Indiana

== Total offense ==
Total offense is the sum of passing and rushing statistics. It does not include receiving or returns.

=== Total offense yards ===
Career
Rank	Player	Yards	Years
1	Chuck Long	10,254	1981 1982 1983 1984 1985
2	Drew Tate	8,427	2003 2004 2005 2006
3	Nate Stanley	8,198	2016 2017 2018 2019
4	Ricky Stanzi	7,373	2007 2008 2009 2010
5	Matt Rodgers	6,855	1988 1989 1990 1991
6	Chuck Hartlieb	6,570	1986 1987 1988
7	C. J. Beathard	5,991	2013 2014 2015 2016
8	Matt Sherman	5,948	1994 1995 1996 1997
9	James Vandenberg	5,853	2009 2010 2011 2012
10	Jake Rudock	5,213	2012 2013 2014

Single season
Rank	Player	Yards	Year
1	Chuck Hartlieb	3,530	1988
2	Chuck Long	3,172	1985
3	James Vandenberg	3,083	2011
4	C. J. Beathard	3,046	2015
5	Ricky Stanzi	2,998	2010
6	Brad Banks	2,996	2002
7	Nate Stanley	2,958	2019
8	Chuck Hartlieb	2,933	1987
9	Drew Tate	2,869	2005
10	Nate Stanley	2,856	2018

Single game
Rank	Player	Yards	Year	Opponent
1	Chuck Hartlieb	516	1988	Indiana
2	Chuck Long	481	1984	Texas
3	Scott Mullen	473	1999	Indiana
4	Chuck Hartlieb	472	1987	Northwestern
5	Chuck Hartlieb	410	1988	NC State
6	Chuck Long	405	1985	Northwestern
7	Chuck Long	398	1983	Northwestern
8	James Vandenberg	391	2011	Pittsburgh
9	Jon Beutjer	390	2000	Indiana
10	Chuck Long	385	1985	Michigan State

== All-Purpose yards ==
All-purpose yards is the sum of yardage gained from the line of scrimmage or after change of possession. It can include rushing, receiving, kick return and punt return yards. It does not include passing yardage.

Career
Rank	Player	Yards	Years
1	Sedrick Shaw	5,043	1993 1994 1995 1996
2	Ronnie Harmon	4,985	1982 1983 1984 1985
3	Tim Dwight	4,890	1994 1995 1996 1997
4	Ladell Betts	4,397	1998 1999 2000 2001
5	Derrell Johnson-Koulianos	4,256	2007 2008 2009 2010
6	Tavian Banks	4,155	1994 1995 1996 1997
7	Albert Young	4,121	2004 2005 2006 2007
8	Kahlil Hill	3,966	1998 1999 2000 2001
9	Akrum Wadley	3,904	2014 2015 2016 2017
10	Kaleb Johnson	3,421	2022 2023 2024

== Scoring ==
=== Total Points ===
Career
Rank	Player	Points	Years
1	Nate Kaeding	373	2000 2001 2002 2003
2	Drew Stevens	352	2022 2023 2024 2025
3	Mike Meyer	324	2010 2011 2012 2013
4	Rob Houghtlin	290	1985 1986 1987
5	Tom Nichol	277	1981 1982 1983 1984
6	Kyle Schlicher	260	2004 2005 2006
7	Keith Duncan	252	2016 2018 2019 2020
8	Tavian Banks	218	1994 1995 1996 1997
	Zach Bromert	218	1995 1996 1997 1998
10	Sedrick Shaw	214	1993 1994 1995 1996
	Jeff Skillett	214	1988 1989 1990 1991

Single season
Rank	Player	Points	Year
1	Kaleb Johnson	138	2024
2	Nate Kaeding	120	2002
	Shonn Greene	120	2008
4	Keith Duncan	119	2019
5	Tavian Banks	114	1997
6	Caleb Shudak	108	2021
7	Drew Stevens	107	2025
8	Nate Kaeding	106	2003
9	Rob Houghtlin	105	1985
10	Rob Houghtlin	104	1987

Single game
Rank	Player	Points	Year	Opponent
1	Larry Lawrence	24	1968	Minnesota
	Dennis Mosley	24	1979	Indiana
	Owen Gill	24	1983	Iowa State
	Quinn Early	24	1987	Northwestern
	Mike Saunders	24	1991	Indiana
	Tavian Banks	24	1997	Tulsa
	Tavian Banks	24	1997	Iowa State
	Ed Hinkel	24	2005	Minnesota
	Shonn Greene	24	2008	Wisconsin
	Jordan Canzeri	24	2015	North Texas
	Akrum Wadley	24	2015	Northwestern

=== Touchdowns ===
Career
Rank	Player	TDs	Years
1	Tavian Banks	36	1994 1995 1996 1997
2	Sedrick Shaw	35	1993 1994 1995 1996
	Akrum Wadley	35	2014 2015 2016 2017
4	Mark Weisman	33	2012 2013 2014
5	Ronnie Harmon	32	1982 1983 1984 1985
	Tim Dwight	32	1994 1995 1996 1997
	Kaleb Johnson	32	2022 2023 2024
8	Marvin McNutt	28	2008 2009 2010 2011
9	David Hudson	27	1985 1986 1987 1988
	Ladell Betts	27	1998 1999 2000 2001

Single season
Rank	Player	TDs	Year
1	Kaleb Johnson	23	2024
2	Shonn Greene	20	2008
3	Tavian Banks	19	1997
4	Mark Gronowski	17	2025
5	Dennis Mosley	16	1979
	Mark Weisman	16	2014
7	Sedrick Shaw	15	1995
	Marcus Coker	15	2011
9	Nick Bell	14	1990
10	Jordan Canzeri	13	2015
	Akrum Wadley	13	2017

Single game
Rank	Player	Points	Year	Opponent
1	Larry Lawrence	4	1968	Minnesota
	Dennis Mosley	4	1979	Indiana
	Owen Gill	4	1983	Iowa State
	Quinn Early	4	1987	Northwestern
	Mike Saunders	4	1991	Indiana
	Tavian Banks	4	1997	Tulsa
	Tavian Banks	4	1997	Iowa State
	Ed Hinkel	4	2005	Minnesota
	Shonn Greene	4	2008	Wisconsin
	Jordan Canzeri	4	2015	North Texas
	Akrum Wadley	4	2015	Northwestern

=== Touchdowns accounted for ===
Career
Rank	Player	TDs	Years
1	Chuck Long	88	1981 1982 1983 1984 1985
2	Nate Stanley	70	2016 2017 2018 2019
3	Drew Tate	64	2003 2004 2005 2006
4	Ricky Stanzi	58	2007 2008 2009 2010
5	Matt Rodgers	56	1988 1989 1990 1991
6	C. J. Beathard	50	2013 2014 2015 2016
7	Matt Sherman	44	1994 1995 1996 1997
8	James Vandenberg	42	2009 2010 2011 2012
	Jake Rudock	42	2012 2013 2014
10	Chuck Hartlieb	39	1986 1987 1988

Single season
Rank	Player	TDs	Year
1	Brad Banks	31	2002
2	Chuck Long	29	1985
3	James Vandenberg	28	2011
4	Ricky Stanzi	27	2010
	Nate Stanley	27	2018
	Mark Gronowski	27	2025
7	Chuck Long	26	1984
	Nate Stanley	26	2017
9	Matt Rodgers	24	1990
	Nathan Chandler	24	2003

Single game
Rank	Player	TDs	Year	Opponent
1	Chuck Hartlieb	7	1987	Northwestern
2	Chuck Long	6	1984	Texas
	Chuck Long	6	1985	Northwestern
	Nate Stanley	6	2018	Indiana
5	Chuck Long	5	1985	Michigan State
	Nate Stanley	5	2017	Iowa State
	Nate Stanley	5	2017	Ohio State
	Spencer Petras	5	2021	Maryland

== Defense ==
=== Interceptions ===
Career
Rank	Player	Ints	Years
1	Nile Kinnick	18	1937 1938 1939
	Devon Mitchell	18	1982 1983 1984 1985
3	Jovon Johnson	17	2002 2003 2004 2005
4	Damien Robinson	14	1993 1994 1995 1996
	Desmond King	14	2013 2014 2015 2016
6	Tyler Sash	13	2008 2009 2010
7	Steve Wilson	12	1966 1967 1968
	Brad Quast	12	1986 1987 1988 1989
	Plez Atkins	12	1994 1995 1996 1997
	Brett Greenwood	12	2007 2008 2009 2010

Single season
Rank	Player	Ints	Year
1	Nile Kinnick	8	1939
	Lou King	8	1981
	Desmond King	8	2015
	Josh Jackson	8	2017
5	Steve Wilson	7	1967
	Jay Norvell	7	1985
	Kerry Burt	7	1987
8	Rod Sears	6	1976
	Mike Stoops	6	1983
	Plez Atkins	6	1995
	Damien Robinson	6	1996
	Jovon Johnson	6	2003
	Tyler Sash	6	2009

Single game
Rank	Player	Ints	Year	Opponent
1	Grant Steen	3	2002	Indiana
	Tyler Sash	3	2009	Iowa State
	Josh Jackson	3	2017	Ohio State

=== Tackles ===
Career
Rank	Player	Tackles	Years
1	Larry Station	492	1982 1983 1984 1985
2	Andre Jackson	465	1972 1973 1974 1975
3	Abdul Hodge	453	2002 2003 2004 2005
4	Josey Jewell	437	2014 2015 2016 2017
5	Brad Quast	435	1986 1987 1988 1989
6	Chad Greenway	416	2002 2003 2004 2005
7	James Morris	400	2010 2011 2012 2013
8	Fred Barr	376	1999 2000 2001 2002
9	Tom Rusk	361	1975 1976 1977 1978
10	Matt Hughes	354	1995 1996 1997 1998

Single season
Rank	Player	Tackles	Year
1	Andre Jackson	171	1972
	Jay Higgins	171	2023
3	Abdul Hodge	158	2005
4	Chad Greenway	156	2005
5	Pat Angerer	145	2009
6	Abdul Hodge	141	2003
7	Dave Clement	140	1970
	Jack Campbell	140	2021
9	Dave Simms	139	1971
	Jim Reilly	139	1988

Single game
Rank	Player	Tackles	Year	Opponent
1	Dave Clement	29	1970	Oregon State
2	Dave Brooks	26	1970	Illinois
	Bobby Diaco	26	1995	Indiana
4	Bob Sanders	25	2001	Indiana
5	Dave Moreland	23	1966	Minnesota
6	Greg Allison	22	1968	Purdue
	Andre Jackson	22	1972	Michigan State
8	Mike Phillips	21	1968	Purdue
	Andre Jackson	21	1972	Ohio State
	Andre Jackson	21	1975	Purdue
	Larry Station	21	1984	Minnesota
	Jim Reilly	21	1988	Indiana

=== Sacks ===
Career
Rank	Player	Sacks	Years
1	Jared DeVries	43.0	1995 1996 1997 1998
2	Mike Wells	33.0	1990 1991 1992 1993
3	Matt Roth	30.0	2001 2002 2003 2004
4	Joe Evans	28.0	2019 2020 2021 2022 2023
5	Larry Blue	26.5	1989 1991 1992 1993
	A. J. Epenesa	26.5	2017 2018 2019
7	Bill Ennis-Inge	24.0	1993 1994 1995 1996
8	Colin Cole	23.0	1999 2000 2001 2002
	Anthony Nelson	23.0	2016 2017 2018
10	Leroy Smith	22.0	1988 1989 1990 1991

Single season
Rank	Player	Sacks	Year
1	Leroy Smith	18.0	1991
2	Jared DeVries	13.0	1996
3	Jim Johnson	12.0	1989
	Jared DeVries	12.0	1995
	Matt Roth	12.0	2003
6	Adrian Clayborn	11.5	2009
	A. J. Epenesa	11.5	2019
8	Mike Wells	11.0	1991
	Larry Blue	11.0	1993
	Jonathan Babineaux	11.0	2004

Single game
Rank	Player	Sacks	Year	Opponent
1	Leroy Smith	5.0	1991	Ohio State
2	Larry Station	4.0	1985	Drake
	Joe Evans	4.0	2023	Tennessee

== Special teams ==
=== Field goals made ===
Career
Rank	Player	FGs	Years
1	Drew Stevens	76	2022 2023 2024 2025
2	Nate Kaeding	67	2000 2001 2002 2003
3	Mike Meyer	61	2010 2011 2012 2013
4	Rob Houghtlin	52	1985 1986 1987
	Keith Duncan	52	2016 2018 2019 2020
6	Kyle Schlicher	51	2003 2004 2005 2006
7	Tom Nichol	43	1981 1982 1983 1984
8	Jeff Skillett	34	1988 1989 1990 1991
9	Daniel Murray	32	2007 2008 2009
10	Miguel Recinos	29	2015 2016 2017 2018

Single season
Rank	Player	FGs	Year
1	Keith Duncan	29	2019
2	Caleb Shudak	24	2021
3	Drew Stevens	22	2025
4	Rob Houghtlin	21	1987
	Nate Kaeding	21	2002
	Kyle Schlicher	21	2004
7	Nate Kaeding	20	2003
	Drew Stevens	20	2024
9	Rob Houghtlin	19	1985
	Daniel Murray	19	2009

Single game
Rank	Player	FGs	Year	Opponent
1	Kyle Schlicher	5	2004	Minnesota
	Drew Stevens	5	2024	Maryland
3	Rob Houghtlin	4	1985	Michigan
	Todd Romano	4	1993	Tulsa
	Nate Kaeding	4	2000	Penn State
	Nate Kaeding	4	2001	Texas Tech
	Nate Kaeding	4	2003	Iowa State
	Nate Kaeding	4	2003	Minnesota
	Mike Meyer	4	2012	Northern Illinois
	Mike Meyer	4	2012	Michigan State
	Keith Duncan	4	2019	Iowa State
	Keith Duncan	4	2019	Purdue
	Keith Duncan	4	2019	Illinois
	Keith Duncan	4	2020	Nebraska
	Caleb Shudak	4	2021	Illinois
	Caleb Shudak	4	2021	Nebraska
	Drew Stevens	4	2022	Northwestern
	Drew Stevens	4	2023	Michigan State
	Drew Stevens	4	2024	Washington

=== Longest Field Goal ===
Game
Rank	Player	Yards	Year	Opponent
1	Tim Douglas	58	1998	Illinois
	Drew Stevens	58	2025	Oregon
3	Marshall Koehn	57	2015	Pittsburgh
4	Tom Nichol	56	1983	Michigan
5	Rob Houghtlin	55	1987	Iowa State
	Nate Kaeding	55	2002	Penn State
	Nate Kaeding	55	2003	Minnesota
	Drew Stevens	55	2025	Albany
9	Brion Hurley	54	1996	Iowa State
	Drew Stevens	54	2022	Northwestern
	Drew Stevens	54	2024	Maryland
	Drew Stevens	54	2025	UMass
	Drew Stevens	54	2025	Indiana
	**Caden Buhr**	54	2026	Wisconsin

=== Punting ===
Career
Rank	Player	Avg	Years
1	Tory Taylor	46.3	2020 2021 2022 2023
2	Reggie Roby	45.6	1979 1980 1981 1982
3	Rhys Dakin	43.9	2024 2025
4	Nick Gallery	42.9	1993 1994 1995 1996
5	Ryan Donahue	41.9	2007 2008 2009 2010
6	Jason Baker	41.3	1997 1998 1999 2000

Single season
Rank	Player	Avg	Year
1	Reggie Roby	49.8	1981
2	Tory Taylor	48.2	2023
3	Reggie Roby	48.1	1982
4	Tory Taylor	46.1	2021
5	Nick Gallery	45.6	1995
6	Tory Taylor	45.4	2022
7	Ryan Donahue	44.6	2010
8	Nick Gallery	44.5	1996
9	Tory Taylor	44.1	2020
	Rhys Dakin	44.1	2024

Longest Punt
Rank	Player	Yards	Year	Opponent
1	Lonnie Rogers	83	1962	Oregon State
2	Ryan Donahue	82	2007	Michigan State
3	Joe Heppner	79	1973	Wisconsin
	Jason Baker	79	1998	Illinois
5	Jason Baker	76	1997	Arizona State
	Ryan Donahue	76	2007	Northwestern
7	Nick Gallery	75	1995	Indiana
	David Bradley	75	2003	Minnesota
9	Jason Baker	74	2000	Illinois
10	Nile Kinnick	73	1939	Indiana
	Nick Gallery	73	1996	Ohio State
	Ryan Donahue	73	2009	Northwestern
	Ryan Donahue	73	2010	Northwestern
