= 2011 Insight Bowl =

- 23rd Insight Bowl
| Iowa Hawkeyes | Oklahoma Sooners |
| (7–5) | (9–3) |
| Big Ten | Big 12 |
| 14 | 31 |
| Head coach: Kirk Ferentz | Head coach: Bob Stoops |
| | AP / Coaches / BCS; 19 / 19 / 14 |
| | 1 | 2 | 3 | 4 | Total |
|---|---|---|---|---|---|
| Iowa | 0 | 0 | 0 | 14 | 14 |
| Oklahoma | 7 | 7 | 7 | 10 | 31 |
- Date: December 30, 2011
- Season: 2011
- Stadium: Sun Devil Stadium
- Location: Tempe, Arizona
- MVP: Blake Bell (Oklahoma); Jamell Fleming (Oklahoma)
- Favorite: Oklahoma by 15
- Referee: Jack Wood (Pac-12)
- Attendance: 54,247
- Payout: US$3.3 million per team

United States TV coverage
- Network: ESPN
- Announcers: Sean McDonough (Play-by-Play); Matt Millen (Analyst); Heather Cox (Sidelines)
- Nielsen ratings: 3.0

The 2011 Insight Bowl, the 23rd edition of the Insight Bowl, was a post-season American college football bowl game, held on December 30, 2011 at Sun Devil Stadium in Tempe, Arizona as part of the 2011–12 NCAA Bowl season.

The game was telecast at 8:00 p.m. MT on ESPN. The Iowa Hawkeyes of the Big Ten Conference faced the Oklahoma Sooners of the Big 12 Conference. Oklahoma won by a score of 31–14.

The game was briefly suspended with 2:22 remaining in the fourth quarter when one of ESPN's skycams crashed onto the field, nearly hitting Iowa wide receiver Marvin McNutt, Jr. The incident has since gone viral on YouTube.

For the 2012 season, the bowl had a new sponsor and a new name as it became the Buffalo Wild Wings Bowl.

== Teams ==
After winning the 2010 Insight Bowl 27–24 over Missouri, the Iowa Hawkeyes are back to take on the Sooners of Oklahoma, which began the season as the top-ranked team in both the Associated Press and ESPN coaches’ polls. The two teams have met only once, in 1979 when Oklahoma defeated Iowa 21–6 in head coach Hayden Fry's second game. On that team were Bob Stoops, the current Oklahoma head coach, and Bruce Kittle, currently a Sooner assistant coach.

=== Iowa ===
The Hawkeyes opened the season unranked, and could not put together anything longer than a two-game winning streak during the 2011 season. The bright spot was a win over No. 13 Michigan at Kinnick Stadium. Iowa entered the Insight Bowl at 7–5 overall (4–4 B1G).

=== Oklahoma ===
After opening the season as the No. 1 ranked team in the preseason polls, the Sooners entered the Insight Bowl with a 9–3 record (6–3 Big 12). Coming off a 44–10 loss to No. 3 Oklahoma State, the Sooners were looking to build momentum for the 2012 season. Head coach Bob Stoops and assistant Bruce Kittle played at Iowa under Hayden Fry in the 1980s.

== Game summary ==
2011 Insight Bowl

| Quarter | 1 | 2 | 3 | 4 | Total |
|---|---|---|---|---|---|
| Iowa | 0 | 0 | 0 | 14 | 14 |
| Oklahoma | 7 | 7 | 7 | 10 | 31 |

at Sun Devil Stadium • Tempe, Arizona

- Date: Friday, December 30, 2011
- Game time: 10:00 p.m. EST (8:00 p.m. local MST)
- Game weather: • Temperature: 62 °F (17 °C) • Wind: calm
- Game attendance: 54,247
- Referee: Jack Wood (Pac-10)
- TV announcers (ESPN): Sean McDonough (play-by-play), Matt Millen (analyst), Heather Cox (sidelines)
- Box score

Game information

First quarter

- 10:19 OU – Blake Bell 4-yard run, Michael Hunnicutt kick good. Drive: 2 plays, 10 yards, 0:30. Oklahoma 7–0

Second quarter

- 6:56 OU – Blake Bell 4-yard run, Michael Hunnicutt kick good. Drive: 13 plays, 66 yards, 4:48. Oklahoma 14–0

Third quarter

- 7:42 OU – Trent Ratterree 3-yard pass from Landry Jones, Michael Hunnicutt kick good. Drive: 10 plays, 64 yards, 3:46. Oklahoma 21–0

Fourth quarter

- 14:46 IOWA – C. J. Fiedorowicz 5-yard pass from James Vandenberg, Mike Meyer kick good. Drive: 16 plays, 75 yards, 7:56. Oklahoma 21–7
- 6:56 IOWA – Jordan Canzeri 9-yard pass from James Vandenberg, Mike Meyer kick good. Drive: 12 plays, 78 yards, 3:28. Oklahoma 21–14
- 2:28 OU – Michael Hunnicutt 35-yard field goal. Drive: 9 plays, 44 yards, 4:28. Oklahoma 24–14
- 0:45 OU – Blake Bell 21-yard run, Michael Hunnicutt kick good. Drive: 4 plays, 30 yards, 1:03. Oklahoma 31–14

=== Statistics ===
| Statistics | Iowa | OU |
|---|---|---|
| First downs | 21 | 15 |
| Plays–yards | 82–292 | 62–275 |
| Rushes–yards | 37–76 | 37–114 |
| Passing yards | 238 | 179 |
| Passing: comp–att–int | 23–45–2 | 16–25–1 |
| Time of possession | 20:03 | 16:22 |

| Team | Category | Player | Statistics |
|---|---|---|---|
| Iowa | Passing | James Vandenberg | 23/44, 216 yards, 2 TD, INT |
| Iowa | Rushing | Jordan Canzeri | 22 rushes, 58 yards |
| Iowa | Receiving | Keenan Davis | 5 receptions, 76 yards |
| OU | Passing | Landry Jones | 16/25, 161 yards, TD, INT |
| OU | Rushing | Blake Bell | 10 rushes, 51 yards, 3 TD |
| OU | Receiving | Kameel Jackson | 3 receptions, 45 yards |
