= 1999 Iowa Hawkeyes football team =

American college football season

1999 Iowa Hawkeyes football
- Conference: Big Ten Conference
- Record: 1–10 (0–8 Big Ten)
- Head coach: Kirk Ferentz (1st season)
- Offensive coordinator: Ken O'Keefe (1st season)
- Offensive scheme: Pro-style
- Defensive coordinator: Norm Parker (1st season)
- Base defense: 4–3
- MVPs: Ladell Betts; Matt Bowen
- Captains: Matt Bowen; Scott Pospisil; Randy Reiners; Travis Senters; Rob Thein
- Home stadium: Kinnick Stadium

1999 Big Ten Conference football standings
	Conf.			Overall
Team	W		L	W		L
No. 4 Wisconsin $	7	–	1	10	–	2
No. 7 Michigan State	6	–	2	10	–	2
No. 5 Michigan %	6	–	2	10	–	2
No. 11 Penn State	5	–	3	10	–	3
No. 18 Minnesota	5	–	3	8	–	4
No. 24 Illinois	4	–	4	8	–	4
No. 25 Purdue	4	–	4	7	–	5
Ohio State	3	–	5	6	–	6
Indiana	3	–	5	4	–	7
Northwestern	1	–	7	3	–	8
Iowa	0	–	8	1	–	10
$ – BCS representative as conference champion; % – BCS at-large representative; Rankings from AP Poll

The 1999 Iowa Hawkeyes football team was an American football team that represented the University of Iowa as a member of the Big Ten Conference during the 1999 NCAA Division I-A football season. In their first year under head coach Kirk Ferentz, the Hawkeyes compiled a 1–10 record (0–8 in conference games), finished in last place in the Big Ten, and were outscored by a total of 347 to 162. Ferentz was hired in December 1998 to replace Hayden Fry, who retired after two decades as head coach.

The team's statistical leaders included Scott Mullen (1,415 passing yards), Ladell Betts (857 rushing yards), and Kevin Kasper (60 receptions for 664 yards). Betts was selected as the team's most valuable player.

The team played its home games at Kinnick Stadium in Iowa City, Iowa.

== Schedule ==
Date	Time	Opponent	Site	TV	Result	Attendance	Source
September 4	11:00 am	No. 5 Nebraska*	Kinnick Stadium; Iowa City, IA	ABC	L 7–42	70,397	
September 11	6:00 pm	at Iowa State*	Jack Trice Stadium; Ames, IA (rivalry)	FSN	L 10–17	50,402	
September 18	5:15 pm	Northern Illinois*	Kinnick Stadium; Iowa City, IA	ESPN Plus	W 24–0	63,478	
October 2	11:00 am	at No. 14 Michigan State	Spartan Stadium; East Lansing, MI	ESPN Plus	L 3–49	73,629	
October 9	11:00 am	No. 2 Penn State	Kinnick Stadium; Iowa City, IA	ESPN Plus	L 7–31	66,398	
October 16	11:00 am	at Northwestern	Ryan Field; Evanston, IL	ESPN Plus	L 21–23	33,962	
October 23	1:00 pm	Indiana^{†}	Kinnick Stadium; Iowa City, IA		L 31–38	63,777	
October 30	11:00 am	at No. 21 Ohio State	Ohio Stadium; Columbus, OH	ESPN Plus	L 11–41	93,561	
November 6	1:00 pm	Illinois	Kinnick Stadium; Iowa City, IA		L 24–40	61,350	
November 13	2:30 pm	at No. 9 Wisconsin	Camp Randall Stadium; Madison, WI (rivalry)	ABC	L 3–41	79,404	
November 20	11:00 am	No. 17 Minnesota	Kinnick Stadium; Iowa City, IA (rivalry)	ESPN Plus	L 21–25	55,386	
*Non-conference game; ^{†}Homecoming; Rankings from AP Poll released prior to the game; All times are in Central time

== Game summaries ==
=== Nebraska ===
Nebraska at Iowa

Team	1	2	3	4	Total
• No. 5 Cornhuskers	0	7	14	21	42
Hawkeyes	0	0	0	7	7

- Date: September 4
- Location: Kinnick Stadium, Iowa City, Iowa
- Game start: 11:00 AM CDT
- Game attendance: 70,397
- Game weather: 92 °F (33 °C), Sunny
- TV announcers (ABC): Roger Twibell, Bob Griese

Scoring summary
2	7:54	Neb	Eric Crouch 28-yard run (Josh Brown kick)	Neb 7–0
3	11:14	Neb	Applegate 47-yard pass from Bobby Newcombe (Brown kick)	Neb 14–0
3	8:46	Neb	Newcombe 1-yard run (Brown kick)	Neb 21–0
4	14:56	Neb	Newcombe 5-yard run (Brown kick)	Neb 28–0
4	9:43	Neb	Crouch 6-yard run (Brown kick)	Neb 35–0
4	5:14	Neb	Crouch 21-yard run (Brown kick)	Neb 42–0
4	2:30	Iowa	Tim Dodge 10-yard blocked punt return (Douglas kick)	Neb 42–7

=== At Iowa State ===
Iowa at Iowa State

Team	1	2	3	4	Total
Hawkeyes	0	0	7	3	10
• Cyclones	14	0	0	3	17

- Date: September 11
- Location: Jack Trice Stadium, Ames, Iowa
- Game start: 6:00 PM CDT
- Game attendance: 50,402
- Television network: FSN

Scoring summary
1	10:36	ISU	Darren Davis 11-yard run (McKnight kick)	ISU 7–0
1	3:33	ISU	Damien Groce 80-yard pass from Sage Rosenfels (McKnight kick)	ISU 14–0
3	9:07	Iowa	Robbie Crockett 1-yard run (Douglas kick)	ISU 14–7
4	12:32	ISU	Mike McKnight 39-yard field goal	ISU 17–7
4	6:36	Iowa	Tim Douglas 47-yard field goal	ISU 17–7

=== Northern Illinois ===
No. Illinois at Iowa

Team	1	2	3	4	Total
Huskies	0	0	0	0	0
• Hawkeyes	0	3	0	21	24

- Date: September 18
- Location: Kinnick Stadium, Iowa City, Iowa
- Game start: 5:15 PM CDT
- Game attendance: 63,478
- Television network: ESPN Plus

Scoring summary
2	2:30	Iowa	Tim Douglas 46-yard field goal	Iowa 3–0
4	13:10	Iowa	Randy Reiners 2-yard run (Douglas kick)	Iowa 10–0
4	9:59	Iowa	LeVar Woods 87-yard blocked field goal return (Douglas kick)	Iowa 17–0
4	7:03	Iowa	Ladell Betts 10-yard run (Douglas kick)	Iowa 24–0

The win over the Huskies marked Kirk Ferentz's first victory as head coach at Iowa.

=== At Michigan State ===
Iowa at Michigan State

Team	1	2	3	4	Total
Hawkeyes	0	0	3	0	3
• No. 14 Spartans	21	14	14	0	49

- Date: October 2
- Location: Spartan Stadium, East Lansing, Michigan
- Game start: 11:00 AM EDT
- Game attendance: 73,629
- Television network: ESPN Plus

Scoring summary
1	12:01	MSU	Plaxico Burress 32-yard pass from Burke (Edinger kick)	MSU 7–0
1	6:42	MSU	Burress 10-yard pass from Burke (Edinger kick)	MSU 14–0
1	3:31	MSU	Scott 20-yard pass from Burke (Edinger kick)	MSU 21–0
2	11:11	MSU	Baker 2-yard pass from Burke (Edinger kick)	MSU 28–0
2	6:17	MSU	Burress 10-yard pass from Van Dyke (Edinger kick)	MSU 35–0
3	13:10	Iowa	Tim Douglas 30-yard field goal	MSU 35–3
3	10:07	MSU	Haygood 35-yard pass from Van Dyke (Edinger kick)	MSU 42–3
3	8:15	MSU	Henry 70-yard punt return (Edinger kick)	MSU 49–3

=== Penn State ===
Penn State at Iowa

Team	1	2	3	4	Total
• No. 2 Nittany Lions	7	7	7	10	31
Hawkeyes	0	0	7	0	7

- Date: October 9
- Location: Kinnick Stadium, Iowa City, Iowa
- Game start: 11:00 AM CDT
- Game attendance: 66,398
- Television network: ESPN Plus

Scoring summary
1	7:19	PSU	Drummond 68-yard run (Forney kick)	PSU 7–0
2	0:09	PSU	Casey 6-yard run (Forney kick)	PSU 14–0
3	9:31	Iowa	Rob Thein 40-yard pass from Randy Reiners (Douglas kick)	PSU 14–7
3	4:36	PSU	McCoo 47-yard run (Forney kick)	PSU 21–7
4	10:05	PSU	Harris 10-yard run (Forney kick)	PSU 28–7
4	4:23	PSU	Forney 26-yard field goal	PSU 31–7

=== At Northwestern ===
Iowa at Northwestern

Team	1	2	3	4	Total
Hawkeyes	0	0	14	7	21
• Wildcats	3	13	0	7	23

- Date: October 16
- Location: Ryan Field, Evanston, Illinois
- Game start: 11:00 AM CDT
- Game attendance: 33,962
- Television network: ESPN Plus

Scoring summary
1	8:57	NW	Tim Long 25-yard field goal	NW 3–0
2	14:52	NW	Tim Long 25 yard-field goal	NW 6–0
2	9:14	NW	Tim Long 28 yard-field goal	NW 9–0
2	1:57	NW	Teddy Johnson 21-yard pass from Zak Kustok (Long kick)	NW 16–0
3	12:13	Iowa	Randy Reiners 3-yard run (Douglas kick)	NW 16–7
3	3:18	Iowa	Scott Mullen 2-yard run (Douglas kick)	NW 16–14
4	11:13	Iowa	Ladell Betts 74-yard run (Douglas kick)	Iowa 21–16
4	0:04	NW	Zak Kustok 2 yard run (Long kick)	NW 23–21

=== Indiana ===
Indiana at Iowa

Team	1	2	3	4	Total
• Hoosiers	7	17	14	0	38
Hawkeyes	0	14	7	10	31

- Date: October 23
- Location: Kinnick Stadium, Iowa City, Iowa
- Game start: 11:00 AM CDT
- Game attendance: 63,777

=== At Ohio State ===
Iowa at Ohio State

Team	1	2	3	4	Total
Hawkeyes	8	0	3	0	11
• No. 21 Buckeyes	7	14	14	6	41

- Date: October 30
- Location: Ryan Field, Evanston, Illinois
- Game start: 11:00 AM CDT
- Game attendance: 93,561
- Television network: ESPN Plus

=== Illinois ===
Illinois at Iowa

Team	1	2	3	4	Total
• Fighting Illini	6	10	10	14	40
Hawkeyes	3	7	7	7	24

- Date: November 6
- Location: Kinnick Stadium, Iowa City, Iowa
- Game start: 1:00 PM CDT
- Game attendance: 61,350

=== At Wisconsin ===
Iowa at Wisconsin

Team	1	2	3	4	Total
Hawkeyes	0	3	0	0	3
• No. 9 Badgers	13	14	7	7	41

- Date: November 13
- Location: Camp Randall Stadium, Madison, Wisconsin
- Game start: 2:30 PM CST
- Game attendance: 79,404
- Television network: ABC

=== Minnesota ===
Minnesota at Iowa

Team	1	2	3	4	Total
• No. 18 Golden Gophers	7	3	5	10	25
Hawkeyes	0	21	0	0	21

- Date: November 20
- Location: Kinnick Stadium, Iowa City, Iowa
- Game start: 11:00 AM CDT
- Game attendance: 55,386
- Television network: ESPN Plus

== Roster ==
1999 Iowa Hawkeyes football team roster
Players
Coaches
Offense

Pos.	#	Name	Class
QB	4	Kyle McCann	So
QB	18	Scott Mullen	Jr
QB	13	Randy Reiners	Sr
RB	46	Ladell Betts	So
RB	15	Robbie Crockett	So
RB	31	Rob Thein	Sr
WR	88	Ryan Barton	Jr
WR	3	Kahlil Hill	So
WR	87	Kevin Kasper	Jr
WR	6	Chris Oliver	So
WR	5	Bashir Yamini	Sr
TE	80	Zeron Flemister	Sr
TE	35	Erik Jensen	Fr
TE	83	Kyle Trippeer	Jr
TE	86	Austin Wheatley	Sr
OL	52	A.J. Blazek	Jr
OL		Jay Bickford	Sr
OL	74	Alonzo Cunningham	So
OL	67	Chad Deal	Sr
OL	78	Robert Gallery	Fr
OL	72	Bruce Nelson	Fr
OL	56	Eric Steinbach	Fr

Defense

Pos.	#	Name	Class
DL	91	Jerry Montgomery	So
LB	44	Dallas Clark	Fr
LB	54	Aaron Kampman	So
LB	56	Vernon Rollins	Sr
LB	97	LeVar Woods	Jr
DB	9	Matt Bowen	Sr
DB	8	Mikkel Brown
DB	2	Tarig Holman	Sr
DB	21	Matt Stockdale	So

Special teams

Pos.	#	Name	Class
K	17	Tim Douglas	Sr
P	7	Jason Baker	Jr

Head coach

- Kirk Ferentz

Coordinators/assistant coaches

- Ken O'Keefe – Offensive Coordinator
- Norm Parker – Defensive Coordinator
- Joe Philbin – Offensive line
- Chuck Long – Quarterbacks
- Carl Jackson – Running backs
- Pat Flaherty – Tight ends/Special teams
- Ron Aiken – Defensive line
- Bret Bielema – Linebackers
- Phil Parker – Defensive backs
- Bill Ennis-Inge – Graduate assistant/Recruiting coordinator

Legend

- (C) Team captain
- (S) Suspended
- (I) Ineligible
- Injured
- Redshirt

== Statistics ==
Team statistics. On offense, the Hawkeyes gained an average of 206.8 passing yards and 93.5 rushing yards per game. They ranked 10th of 11 teams in scoring offense with an average of 14.7 points per game. On defense, they gave up an average of 218.1 passing yards and 245.3 rushing yards per game. They ranked 10th out of 11 teams in scoring defense, giving up an average of 31.5 points per game.

Passing. Quarterback Scott Mullen completed 126 of 226 passes (55.8%) for 1,415 yards, five touchdowns, seven interceptions, and a 109.5 passer rating.

Rushing. Running back Ladell Betts led the team with 857 rushing yards on 189 yards.

Receiving. Wide receiver Kevin Kasper led the team with 60 receptions for 664 yards.

Scoring. Kicker Tim Douglas led the team in scoring with 37 points, converting 19 of 19 extra points and six of eleven field goals. Ladell Betts ranked second with 36 points on six touchdowns.

== Awards and honors ==
Sophomore running back Ladell Betts and senior safety Matt Bowen were selected as the team's most valuable players.

Betts received second-team honors from the coaches on the 1999 All-Big Ten Conference football team. Bowen received second-team All-Big Ten honors from the media.

== 2000 NFL draft ==
Player	Position	Round	Pick	NFL club	Ref
Austin Wheatley	Tight end	5	158	New Orleans Saints	
Matt Bowen	Defensive back	6	198	St. Louis Rams	
