= 1998 Iowa Hawkeyes football team =

American college football season

1998 Iowa Hawkeyes football
- Conference: Big Ten Conference
- Record: 3–8 (2–6 Big Ten)
- Head coach: Hayden Fry (20th season)
- Offensive coordinator: Don Patterson (7th season)
- Offensive scheme: Pro-style
- Defensive coordinator: Bob Elliott (3rd season)
- Base defense: 3–4
- MVPs: Jared DeVries; Derek Rose
- Captains: Michael Burger; Jared DeVries; Matt Hughes; Derek Rose
- Home stadium: Kinnick Stadium

1998 Big Ten Conference football standings
	Conf.			Overall
Team	W		L	W		L
No. 2 Ohio State %+	7	–	1	11	–	1
No. 6 Wisconsin $+	7	–	1	11	–	1
No. 12 Michigan +	7	–	1	10	–	3
No. 24 Purdue	6	–	2	9	–	4
No. 17 Penn State	5	–	3	9	–	3
Michigan State	4	–	4	6	–	6
Minnesota	2	–	6	5	–	6
Indiana	2	–	6	4	–	7
Illinois	2	–	6	3	–	8
Iowa	2	–	6	3	–	8
Northwestern	0	–	8	3	–	9
$ – BCS representative as conference champion; % – BCS at-large representative; + – Conference co-champions; Rankings from AP Poll

The 1998 Iowa Hawkeyes football team represented the University of Iowa as a member of the Big Ten Conference during the 1998 NCAA Division I-A football season. Led Hayden Fry in his 20th and final season as head coach, the Hawkeyes compiled an overall record of 3–8 with a mark of 2–6 in conference play, placing in a fourth-way tie for seventh in the Big Ten. The team played home games at Kinnick Stadium in Iowa City, Iowa.

== Schedule ==
Date	Time	Opponent	Site	TV	Result	Attendance	Source
September 5	11:30 am	Central Michigan*	Kinnick Stadium; Iowa City, IA	ESPN Plus	W 38–0	58,920	
September 12	11:00 am	Iowa State*	Kinnick Stadium; Iowa City, IA (rivalry)	ESPN2	L 9–27	70,397	
September 19	9:00 pm	at No. 16 Arizona*	Arizona Stadium; Tucson, AZ	FSN	L 11–35	52,634	
September 26	11:00 am	at Illinois	Memorial Stadium; Champaign, IL	ESPN	W 37–14	44,245	
October 3	2:30 pm	No. 25 Michigan	Kinnick Stadium; Iowa City, IA	ABC	L 9–12	70,397	
October 10	11:00 am	Northwestern^{†}	Kinnick Stadium; Iowa City, IA	ESPN	W 26–24	70,397	
October 17	11:00 am	at Indiana	Memorial Stadium; Bloomington, IN	ESPN+	L 7–14	36,598	
October 24	2:30 pm	No. 9 Wisconsin	Kinnick Stadium; Iowa City, IA (rivalry)	ABC	L 0–31	70,397	
October 31	1:00 pm	at Purdue	Ross–Ade Stadium; West Lafayette, IN		L 14–36	50,443	
November 14	2:30 pm	No. 7 Ohio State	Kinnick Stadium; Iowa City, IA	ABC	L 14–45	69,473	
November 21	1:30 pm	at Minnesota	Hubert H. Humphrey Metrodome; Minneapolis, MN (rivalry)		L 7–49	50,640	
*Non-conference game; ^{†}Homecoming; Rankings from AP Poll released prior to the game; All times are in Central time

== Game summaries ==
=== Central Michigan ===
Central Michigan at Iowa

Team	1	2	3	4	Total
Chippewas	0	0	0	0	0
• Hawkeyes	7	0	28	3	38

- Date: September 5
- Location: Kinnick Stadium, Iowa City, Iowa
- Game start: 11:35 a.m. CDT
- Game attendance: 58,920
- Referee: B. LeMonnier
- Television network: ESPN+

Scoring summary
1	13:27	Iowa	Kahlil Hill 62-yard punt return (Bromert kick)	Iowa 7-0
3	14:47	Iowa	Kahlil Hill 88-yard kickoff return (Bromert kick)	Iowa 14-0
3	8:36	Iowa	Ladell Betts 23-yard run (Bromert kick)	Iowa 21-0
3	1:29	Iowa	Ladell Betts 40-yard run (Bromert kick)	Iowa 28-0
3	0:00	Iowa	Chris Oliver 22-yard pass from Kyle McCann (Bromert kick)	Iowa 35-0
4	11:21	Iowa	Zach Bromert 33-yard field goal	Iowa 38-0

=== Iowa State ===
Iowa State at Iowa

Team	1	2	3	4	Total
• Cyclones	10	10	7	0	27
Hawkeyes	3	0	6	0	9

- Date: September 12
- Location: Kinnick Stadium, Iowa City, Iowa
- Game start: 11:10 a.m. CDT
- Game attendance: 70,397
- Game weather: 88 °F (31 °C), Clear and sunny, Wind SW 5 mph (8.0 km/h)
- Television network: ESPN2

Scoring summary
1	12:18	ISU	Darren Davis 12-yard run (Kohl kick)	ISU 7-0
1	5:00	ISU	Jamie Kohl 28-yard field goal	ISU 10-0
1	0:16	Iowa	Tim Douglas 48-yard field goal	ISU 10-3
2	10:21	ISU	Joe Parmentier 1-yard run (Kohl kick)	ISU 17-3
2	0:02	ISU	Jamie Kohl 24-yard field goal	ISU 20-3
3	12:57	ISU	Joe Parmentier 1-yard run (Kohl kick)	Iowa 27-3
3	6:03	Iowa	Ladell Betts 4-yard run (pass failed)	ISU 27-9

=== At Arizona ===
Iowa at Arizona

Team	1	2	3	4	Total
Hawkeyes	3	0	0	8	11
• No. 16 Wildcats	7	7	7	14	35

- Date: September 19
- Location: Arizona Stadium
  Tucson, AZ
- Game start: 7:22 pm
- Elapsed time: 3:26
- Game attendance: 52,634
- Game weather: 90 °F (32 °C), clear and dark, Wind W 9 mph (14 km/h)
- Referee: Jim Springer

Scoring summary
1	4:21	Ariz	Trung Candidate 1-yard run (McDonald kick)	Iowa 3-0
1	0:00	Iowa	Tim Douglas 40-yard field goal	Ariz 7-3
2	8:23	Ariz	Trung Candidate 38-yard run (McDonald kick)	Ariz 14-3
3	5:25	Ariz	Kelvin Eafon 2-yard run (McDonald kick)	Ariz 21-3
4	13:01	Ariz	Dennis Northcutt 44-yard pass from Keith Smith (McDonald kick)	Ariz 28-3
4	7:38	Ariz	Kelvin Eafon 2-yard run (McDonald kick)	Ariz 35-3
4	0:14	Iowa	Chris Oliver 24-yard pass from Scott Mullen (Mullen run)	Ariz 35-11

=== At Illinois ===
Iowa at Illinois

Team	1	2	3	4	Total
• Hawkeyes	0	27	10	0	37
Fighting Illini	0	0	0	14	14

- Date: September 26
- Location: Memorial Stadium
  Champaign, IL
- Game attendance: 44,245

Scoring summary
2	14:13	Iowa	Tim Douglas 51-yard field goal	Iowa 3-0
2	10:52	Iowa	Ladell Betts 4-yard run (Bromert kick)	Iowa 10-0
2	9:42	Iowa	Kahlil Hill 57-yard punt return (Bromert kick)	Iowa 17-0
2	2:43	Iowa	Slattery 47-yard interception return (Bromert kick)	Iowa 24-0
2	0:00	Iowa	Tim Douglas 58-yard field goal	Iowa 27-0
3	11:53	Iowa	Hill 51-yard pass from McCann (Bromert kick)	Iowa 34-0
3	4:52	Iowa	Tim Douglas 51-yard field goal	Iowa 37-0
4	7:35	Illinois	Harvey 25-yard run (Rackers kick)	Iowa 37-7
4	3:22	Illinois	Kittner 1-yard run (Rackers kick)	Iowa 37-14

Tim Douglas kicked three field goals from beyond 50 yards, including a school-record 58-yard field goal.

=== Michigan ===
Michigan at Iowa

Team	1	2	3	4	Total
• No. 25 Wolverines	7	0	0	5	12
Hawkeyes	0	9	0	0	9

- Date: October 3
- Location: Kinnick Stadium, Iowa City, Iowa
- Game start: 2:35 p.m. CDT
- Game attendance: 70,397
- Game weather: 52 °F (11 °C), Rain and drizzle, Wind E 5–10 mph (8.0–16.1 km/h)
- Referee: B. LeMonnier

Scoring summary
1	8:40	Mich	Tai Streets 14-yard pass from Tom Brady (Feely kick)	Mich 7-0
2	12:29	Iowa	Tim Douglas 49-yard field goal	Mich 7-3
2	6:47	Iowa	Zach Bromert 29-yard field goal	Mich 7-6
2	00:15	Iowa	Zach Bromert 28-yard field goal	Iowa 9-7
4	8:19	Mich	Jay Feely 22-yard field goal	Mich 10-9
4	0:39	Mich	Anthony Jordan safety	Mich 12-9

=== Northwestern ===
Northwestern at Iowa

Team	1	2	3	4	Total
Wildcats	0	10	7	7	24
• Hawkeyes	14	3	0	9	26

- Date: October 10
- Location: Kinnick Stadium, Iowa City, Iowa
- Game start: 11:10 AM CDT
- Elapsed time: 3:35
- Game attendance: 70,397
- Game weather: 62 °F (17 °C), Sunny, Wind S 10–12 mph (16–19 km/h)
- Referee: D. Witvoet
- Television network: ESPN2

Scoring summary
1	5:26	Iowa	Kahlil Hill 23-yard pass from Randy Reiners (Bromert kick)	Iowa 7-0
1	1:18	Iowa	Ladell Betts 2-yard run (Bromert kick)	Iowa 14-0
2	8:18	Iowa	Zach Bromert 27-yard field goal	Iowa 17-0
2	5:16	NW	Damien Anderson 1-yard run (Gowins kick)	Iowa 17-7
2	0:57	NW	Brian Gowins 30-yard field goal	Iowa 17-10
3	0:19	NW	D'Wayne Bates 66-yard pass from Gavin Hoffman (Gowins kick)	Tied 17-17
4	13:43	Iowa	Safety	Iowa 19-17
4	11:04	Iowa	Kevin Kasper 49-yard pass from Randy Reiners (Bromert kick)	Iowa 26-17
4	1:13	NW	John Burden 25-yard pass from Gavin Hoffman (Gowins kick)	Iowa 26-24

This would end up being Hayden Fry's last win at Iowa. He remained Iowa's all-time wins leader until surpassed by Kirk Ferentz almost 20 year's later.

=== At Indiana ===
Iowa at Indiana

Team	1	2	3	4	Total
Hawkeyes	0	0	7	0	7
• Hoosiers	0	0	0	14	14

- Date: October 17
- Location: Memorial Stadium
  Bloomington, IN
- Game start: 11:10 am
- Elapsed time: 3:05
- Game attendance: 36,598
- Game weather: 74 °F (23 °C), Sunny, mild, Wind SW 10–15 mph (16–24 km/h)
- Referee: J. Teitz

Scoring summary
3	10:31	Iowa	Zeron Flemister 11-yard pass from Randy Reiners (Bromert kick)	Iowa 7-0
4	8:40	Indiana	Chris Gall 1-yard run (Payne kick)	Tied 7-7
4	0:41	Indiana	Antwaan Randle El 8-yard run (Payne kick)	Indiana 14-7

=== Wisconsin ===
Wisconsin at Iowa

Team	1	2	3	4	Total
• No. 9 Badgers	7	3	12	9	31
Hawkeyes	0	0	0	0	0

- Date: October 24
- Location: Kinnick Stadium, Iowa City, Iowa
- Game start: 2:35 p.m. CDT
- Game attendance: 70,397
- Game weather: 63 °F (17 °C), Mostly sunny, Wind SE 5–10 mph (8.0–16.1 km/h)
- Referee: S. Newman

Scoring summary
1	3:29	Wis	Ron Dayne 2-yard run (Davenport kick)	Wisconsin 7-0
2	4:53	Wis	Matt Davenport 38-yard field goal	Wisconsin 10-0
3	6:51	Wis	Safety	Wisconsin 12-0
3	3:34	Wis	Matt Davenport 21-yard field goal	Wisconsin 15-0
3	0:08	Wis	Mike Samuel 14-yard run (Davenport kick)	Wisconsin 22-0
4	8:57	Wis	Matt Davenport 26-yard field goal	Wisconsin 25-0
4	0:26	Wis	Eddie Faulkner 1-yard run (kick failed)	Wisconsin 31-0

=== Purdue ===
Iowa at Purdue

Team	1	2	3	4	Total
Hawkeyes	0	0	0	14	14
• Boilermakers	7	12	10	7	36

- Date: October 31
- Location: Ross–Ade Stadium, West Lafayette, IN
- Game start: 1:00 pm
- Elapsed time: 2:54
- Game attendance: 50,443
- Game weather: 58 °F (14 °C), Cloudy/Halloweenish, Wind NE 5 mph (8.0 km/h)
- Referee: Dick Honig

Scoring summary
1	6:16	Pur	Tim Stratton 14-yard pass from Drew Brees (Dorsch kick)	Purdue 7-0
2	7:02	Pur	Randall Lane 33-yard pass from Drew Brees (kick failed)	Purdue 13-0
2	5:20	Pur	Isaac Jones 9-yard pass from Drew Brees (Brees rush failed)	Purdue 19-0
3	8:57	Pur	Travis Dorsch 30-yard field goal	Purdue 22-0
3	5:36	Pur	Tim Stratton 2-yard pass from Drew Brees (Dorsch kick)	Purdue 29-0
4	6:56	Iowa	Eric Thigpen 29-yard fumble return (Bromert kick)	Purdue 29-7
4	3:09	Pur	Robert Tolbert 40-yard pass from David Edgerton (Dorsch kick)	Purdue 36-7
4	1:28	Iowa	Robbie Crockett 30-yard run (Bromert kick)	Purdue 36-14

=== Ohio State ===
Ohio State at Iowa

Team	1	2	3	4	Total
• No. 7 Buckeyes	14	14	7	10	45
Hawkeyes	7	7	0	0	14

- Date: November 14
- Location: Kinnick Stadium, Iowa City, Iowa
- Game start: 2:35 p.m. CST
- Game attendance: 69,473
- Game weather: 61 °F (16 °C), Clear skies, Wind NW 17–20 mph (27–32 km/h)
- Referee: J. Teitz
- Television network: ABC

Scoring summary
1	8:32	Iowa	Scott Mullen 11-yard run (Bromert kick)	Iowa 7-0
1	8:16	OSU	Joe Montgomery 80-yard run (Stultz kick)	Tied 7-7
1	0:06	OSU	David Boston 54-yard pass from Joe Germaine (Stultz kick)	OSU 14-7
2	13:49	OSU	Mike Collins 22-yard interception return (Stultz kick)	OSU 21-7
2	2:24	Iowa	Kyle McCann 13-yard run (Bromert kick)	OSU 21-14
2	0:27	OSU	David Boston 17-yard pass from Joe Germaine (Stultz kick)	OSU 28-14
3	4:33	OSU	Matt Keller 16-yard pass from Joe Germaine (Stultz kick)	OSU 35-14
4	13:10	OSU	Dan Stultz 27-yard field goal	OSU 38-14
4	5:09	OSU	Jamar Martin 10-yard run (Stultz kick)	OSU 45-14

=== Minnesota ===
Iowa at Minnesota

Team	1	2	3	4	Total
Hawkeyes	0	0	0	7	7
• Golden Gophers	0	21	21	7	49

- Date: November 21
- Location: Metrodome, Minneapolis, MN
- Game start: 1:35 pm CST
- Elapsed time: 3:10
- Game attendance: 50,640
- Game weather: Indoors
- Referee: D. Lipski

Scoring summary
2	8:08	Minn	Billy Cockerham 6-yard run (Bailey kick)	Minnesota 7-0
2	3:09	Minn	Thomas Hamner 56-yard run (Bailey kick)	Minnesota 14-0
2	1:44	Minn	Luke Leverson 28-yard pass from Billy Cockerham (Bailey kick)	Minnesota 21-0
3	9:53	Minn	Luke Leverson 27-yard pass from Billy Cockerham (Bailey kick)	Minnesota 28-0
3	9:26	Minn	Billy Cockerham 5-yard run (Bailey kick)	Minnesota 35-0
3	7:35	Minn	Byron Evans 5-yard run (Bailey kick)	Minnesota 42-0
4	5:32	Minn	A. Henderson 34-yard run (Bailey kick)	Minnesota 49-0
4	0:45	Iowa	Robbie Crockett 1-yard run (Douglas kick)	Minnesota 49-7

== Roster ==
1998 Iowa Hawkeyes football team roster
Players
Coaches
Offense

Pos.	#	Name	Class
RB	46	Ladell Betts	Fr
FB	85	Michael Burger	Sr
OL	74	Alonzo Cunningham	Fr
OL	67	Chad Deal	Jr
TE	80	Zeron Flemister	Jr
WR	3	Kahlil Hill	Fr
WR	87	Kevin Kasper	So
QB	4	Kyle McCann	Fr
QB	18	Scott Mullen	So
OL	72	Bruce Nelson	Fr
WR	6	Chris Oliver	Fr
QB	13	Randy Reiners	Jr
RB	31	Rob Thein	Jr
TE	86	Austin Wheatley	Jr
WR	5	Bashir Yamini	Jr

Defense

Pos.	#	Name	Class
DB	9	Matt Bowen	Jr
DL	94	Jared DeVries	Sr
DE	54	Aaron Kampman	Fr
DL	91	Jerry Montgomery	Fr
LB	97	LeVar Woods	So

Special teams

Pos.	#	Name	Class
P	7	Jason Baker	So
K	38	Zach Bromert	Sr
K	17	Tim Douglas	Jr

Head coach

- Hayden Fry

Coordinators/assistant coaches

- Don Patterson – Offensive Coordinator
- Bob Elliott – Defensive Coordinator
- Chuck Long – Quarterbacks
- Bret Bielema – Linebackers
- Bill Ennis-Inge – Graduate assistant/Recruiting coordinator

Legend

- (C) Team captain
- (S) Suspended
- (I) Ineligible
- Injured
- Redshirt

== Postseason awards ==
- Jared DeVries: consensus first-team All-American (defensive tackle)

== Team players in the 1999 NFL draft ==
Player	Position	Round	Pick	NFL club
Jared DeVries	Defensive tackle	3	70	Detroit Lions
Eric Thigpen	Defensive back	6	200	Atlanta Falcons
