= 2010 Orange Bowl =

2010 FedEx Orange Bowl
- BCS Bowl Game; 76th Orange Bowl
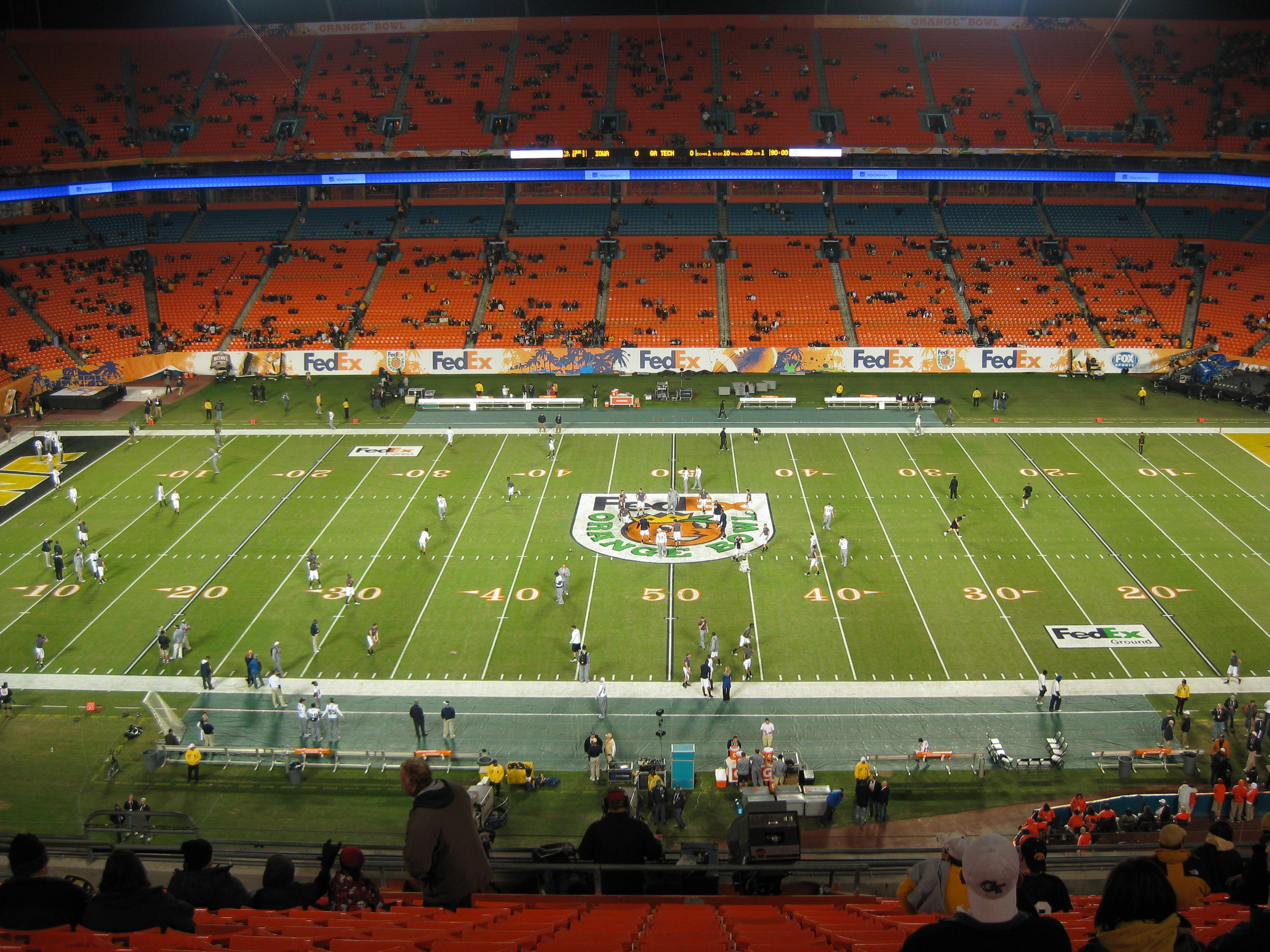
- Land Shark Stadium during the Orange Bowl.
Iowa Hawkeyes	Georgia Tech Yellow Jackets
(10–2)	(11–2)
Big Ten	ACC
24	14
Head coach: Kirk Ferentz	Head coach: Paul Johnson
AP / Coaches / BCS; 10 / 11 / 10	AP / Coaches / BCS; 9 / 10 / 9
	1	2	3	4	Total
Iowa	14	0	3	7	24
Georgia Tech	7	0	0	7	14
- Date: January 5, 2010
- Season: 2009
- Stadium: Land Shark Stadium
- Location: Miami Gardens, Florida
- MVP: Adrian Clayborn, DE, Iowa
- Favorite: Georgia Tech by 6 (51)
- National anthem: Nicole Henry
- Referee: Steve Shaw (SEC)
- Halftime show: Kool & the Gang ft. Carla O'Connor and Lanie Gerlach
- Attendance: 66,131
- Payout: US$18,000,000

United States TV coverage
- Network: Fox
- Announcers: Dick Stockton, Charles Davis, Chris Myers and Laura Okmin
- Nielsen ratings: 6.8

The 2010 FedEx Orange Bowl game featured the Georgia Tech Yellow Jackets and the Iowa Hawkeyes on Tuesday, January 5, 2010, at Land Shark Stadium in Miami Gardens, Florida. Iowa won the game 24–14, securing the Hawkeyes' first major bowl win since the 1959 Rose Bowl.

Georgia Tech was selected to participate in the Orange Bowl after an 11–2 season that culminated in a 39–34 victory in the 2009 ACC Championship Game. Iowa was selected as the other half of the matchup after a 10–2 season that ended with a 12–0 win against Minnesota. In the weeks between the teams' selection and the playing of the game, media attention focused on Georgia Tech's proficient offense and Iowa's highly rated defense.

The game was part of the 2009–10 Bowl Championship Series (BCS) of the 2009 NCAA Division I FBS football season and the last game of the season for both teams. It was the coldest Orange Bowl in Miami's history with a kick-off temperature of 49 degrees.

The game was televised in the United States on FOX, and marked the end of the broadcast agreement between the BCS and FOX, as ESPN took over all BCS broadcast rights in 2011. This was Iowa's second Orange Bowl appearance (first appearance in 2003 Orange Bowl), and Georgia Tech's sixth appearance, but first since 1967. It was the first time that the two teams had played against each other.

On July 14, 2011, the NCAA vacated Georgia Tech's appearance in the bowl game as a consequence for violations committed by the football program.

== Team selection ==
The Orange Bowl is one of five Bowl Championship Series (BCS) bowl games that have been played at the conclusion of every college football season since 2006. (Note: Between 1998 and 2006, there were four BCS games.) As defined by contract, the bowl matches the champion of the Atlantic Coast Conference (ACC) against an at-large pick chosen by a special committee. On December 5, 2009, the Georgia Tech Yellow Jackets defeated the Clemson Tigers in the 2009 ACC Championship Game, thus winning an automatic bid to the 2010 Orange Bowl Game.

The at-large spot in the Orange Bowl was filled via a round-robin selection procedure defined by the other Bowl Championship series games (the Sugar, Fiesta, and Rose bowls) and the automatic bids. The order of at-large selections rotates annually among the BCS bowls. In 2010, after the bowls who lost host teams to the 2010 BCS National Championship Game chose their replacements, the Orange Bowl picked first, followed by the Fiesta Bowl, then the Sugar Bowl. Having lost their SEC tie-in (Alabama Crimson Tide) to the national title game, the Sugar Bowl chose the Florida Gators as the replacement. Likewise, the Fiesta Bowl picked the Texas Christian Horned Frogs to replace the Big-12 champion 2010 Texas Longhorns. The Orange Bowl then selected the Iowa Hawkeyes, while the Fiesta Bowl picked the Boise State Broncos to set up a battle of the unbeatens. The Sugar Bowl was thus left to select Big East Conference champion Cincinnati Bearcats, fulfilling the BCS' contractual obligation to provide a game for the conference's champion.

=== Iowa ===
The Hawkeyes entered the 2009 season after a 9–4 overall 2008 record that included a 31–10 win in the 2009 Outback Bowl over South Carolina. Iowa's first game over Northern Iowa was a sign of things to come in the season. With 7 seconds left in the game, Northern Iowa attempted a 40-yard field goal that was blocked. Iowa avoided touching the ball thinking the ball had crossed the line of scrimmage, while in fact it had not. Northern Iowa's recovery allowed for another attempt with 1 second left. But once again, the attempt was blocked, giving Iowa a 17–16 victory.

Iowa won their next seven games, including a 21–10 win over top-five-ranked Penn State, a last-minute stop to beat Michigan, and a last-second touchdown to get a win over Michigan State.

On November 7, Iowa appeared to be headed for a 10–0 record when they took an early 10–0 lead against the Northwestern Wildcats. However, early in the second quarter, quarterback Ricky Stanzi was knocked out of the game with an ankle injury, in a play that resulted in the Wildcats' first touchdown. Iowa did not score again in the game, and lost, 17–10. The Hawkeyes' following game, vs. Ohio State, would determine which team would earn a berth to the Rose Bowl. Down 24–10 with 11:11 left, Iowa staged a comeback to force overtime. But redshirt freshman quarterback James Vandenberg, filling in for the injured Stanzi, threw an interception in the first overtime series. Ohio State took advantage and sealed a 27–24 victory with a 39-yard field goal. Iowa ended the season with a 12–0 shutout over the Minnesota Gophers. Iowa stayed at the Fountaine Bleu in Miami, before the Orange Bowl.

=== Georgia Tech ===
Georgia Tech ended the 2008 college football season with a 9–4 record under first-year head coach Paul Johnson, including a share of the ACC Coastal Crown, a win over Florida State, rival Georgia Bulldogs, and a 38–3 loss in the 2008 Chick-fil-A Bowl.

The Yellow Jackets opened the 2009 college football season with a 37–17 win over Jacksonville State. Georgia Tech's second game against the Clemson Tigers saw the Yellow Jackets build up a 24-0 lead, only to see Clemson crawl back to take a 27-24 lead in the fourth quarter. GT would survive, winning 30-27 on a last minute field goal. In Tech's first road game of the year, the Yellow Jackets left Land Shark Stadium with a 17–33 loss to the Miami Hurricanes.

Following the loss, Georgia Tech won eight straight games, including a win over number 4 Virginia Tech. The win was GT's first home win over a top-five team since 1962.

In Tech's final game of the regular season, the Clean, Old-Fashioned Hate rivalry game vs Georgia, GT would lose its second game of the season. Down 6 with less than two minutes remaining, the Yellow Jackets gave up their run offense and had four consecutive incomplete "Hail Mary" passes. On 4th and 10 at Georgia's 46-yard line, quarterback Josh Nesbitt's pass to a wide open Demaryius Thomas was dropped, sealing a 30-24 win for the Bulldogs.

In a week 2 rematch, GT faced Clemson in the 2009 ACC Championship Game. In an exciting, high scoring game that saw no punts, the Yellow Jackets barely eked out a 39-34 victory to earn their first BCS berth.

== Pregame buildup ==
=== Iowa offense ===
Iowa entered the Orange bowl ranked 83rd (of 120 Division I FBS teams) in total offense. The team was ranked 42nd in passing offense and 95th in rushing offense.

=== Georgia Tech offense ===
At the conclusion of the regular season before the Orange Bowl, Georgia Tech's offense was among the best in Division I, ranked 10th in total offense, 2nd in rushing offense, but only 116th in passing offense (out of 120 teams). The triple option was able to rack up an average of 306.23 rushing yards per game before the Orange Bowl.

=== Iowa defense ===
Iowa's defense was considered among the best in Division I, ranking 10th in total defense. The Hawkeyes ranked 34th in rushing defense and 4th in passing defense.

=== Georgia Tech defense ===
The Yellow Jackets were ranked 54th in total defense, 68th in rushing defense, and 45th in passing defense.

== Game summary ==
=== First Quarter ===
The first drive of the coldest Orange Bowl ever started with an Iowa fumble at its own 47-yard line. Despite having good starting field position, Georgia Tech was forced to punt. On Iowa's second drive of the game, quarterback Ricky Stanzi drove the Hawkeyes 80 yards, culminating in a 3-yard touchdown pass to Marvin McNutt. The Yellow Jackets' second drive ended in another punt. Iowa scored another touchdown on the following drive, with Stanzi hitting Colin Sandeman for 21 yards, giving the Hawkeyes a 14-0 lead. On the ensuing drive, GT punted for the third time in a row. On Iowa's next drive, Stanzi was intercepted by Jerrard Tarrant. Tarrant returned the interception for a touchdown, cutting Iowa's lead in half.

=== Second Quarter ===
The second quarter started with 6 straight punts. With less than one minute left in the half, Iowa faced a 4th and 5 on Georgia Tech's 43. But Stanzi's pass fell incomplete to Marvin McNutt. With only 12 seconds left, GT quarterback Josh Nesbitt was sacked, ending the quarter.

=== Third Quarter ===
Georgia Tech started the third quarter off with the ball. Their first drive ended in a 41-yard field goal attempt that was missed by kicker Scott Blair. On the next drive, Iowa's Daniel Murray connected on a 33-yard field goal to give Iowa a 17-7 lead.

=== Fourth Quarter ===
On the first drive of the fourth quarter, Georgia Tech's Anthony Allen rushed for a 1-yard touchdown to cut Iowa's lead to 17-14. Iowa was forced to punt on its following drive. On the first play of the next drive, Nesbitt was intercepted, giving Iowa great field position at Georgia Tech's 15. On a 4th and goal on the 3-yard line, Iowa attempted a fake field goal. Kicker Murray fumbled the ball on the attempt giving GT possession. On the first play of the next drive, while trying to evade defenders, Jonathan Dwyer ended up in his own endzone. He narrowly avoided a safety by dodging tacklers and reaching the 1-yard line. But the 11-yard loss hurt the Yellow Jackets and they were once again forced to punt. Iowa's next drive ended with a Brandon Wegher 32-yard touchdown rush, giving the Hawkeyes a 24-14 lead. Down 10, with less than 2 minutes left, Georgia Tech was forced to go for it on a 4th and 8 on their own 32. Nesbitt's pass to Demaryius Thomas fell incomplete, allowing Iowa to run out the clock. A final sack of Nesbitt by Iowa Defensive end Adrian Clayborn helped to seal the deal for the Hawkeyes, giving them their first major bowl victory in 51 years.

== Awards ==
Iowa's win gave them the 2010 Orange Bowl trophy, and Iowa defensive end Adrian Clayborn was named the MVP. Clayborn and Stanzi, during the press conference at the end of the game, both announced their intention to return to Iowa for their senior years.

== Scoring summary ==
Scoring Play	Score
1st Quarter
Iowa – Marvin McNutt 3-yard pass from Ricky Stanzi (Daniel Murray kick), 8:10	Iowa 7–0
Iowa – Colin Sandeman 21-yard pass from Ricky Stanzi (Daniel Murray kick), 4:04	Iowa 14–0
GT – Jerrard Tarrant 40-yard interception return (Scott Blair kick), 0:24	Iowa 14–7
2nd Quarter
No Scoring	Iowa 14–7
3rd Quarter
Iowa – Daniel Murray 33-yard field goal, 2:17	Iowa 17–7
4th Quarter
GT – Anthony Allen 1-yard run (Scott Blair kick), 12:30	Iowa 17–14
Iowa – Brandon Wegher 32-yard run (Daniel Murray kick), 2:58	Iowa 24–14

== Final statistics ==
Statistical comparison
	IOWA	GT
1st downs	21	9
Total yards	403	155
Passing yards	231	12
Rushing yards	172	143
Penalties	4–25	9–68
3rd down conversions	5–13	4–12
4th down conversions	0–2	0–1
Turnovers	2	1
Time of possession	32:23	27:37

=== Iowa statistical recap ===
Individual Leaders
Iowa Passing
	C/ATT	Yds	TD	INT
R. Stanzi	17/29	231	2	1
Iowa Rushing
	Car	Yds	TD	LG
B. Wegher	16	113	1	32
A. Robinson	14	59	0	15
R. Stanzi	6	10	0	9
B. Morse	1	3	0	3
Iowa Receiving
	Rec	Yds	TD	LG
T. Moeaki	4	85	0	54
D. Johnson-Koulianos	4	63	0	31
C. Sandeman	4	53	1	21
M. McNutt	4	21	1	8
T. Stross	1	9	0	0

=== Georgia Tech statistical recap ===
Individual Leaders
Georgia Tech Passing
	C/ATT	Yds	TD	INT
J. Nesbitt	2/9	12	0	1
Georgia Tech Rushing
	Car	Yds	TD	LG
J. Dwyer	14	49	0	15
J. Nesbitt	20	26	0	13
E. Peeples	3	27	0	14
A. Allen	3	21	1	16
M. Wright	1	0	0	0
Georgia Tech Receiving
	Rec	Yds	TD	LG
J. Dwyer	2	12	0	11
