= Abdul Hodge =

American football player and coach (born 1982)

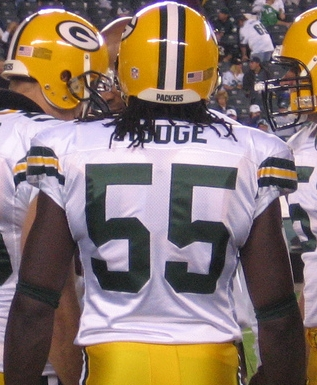
- Hodge with the Green Bay Packers in 2006

Current position
- Title: Tight ends coach
- Team: Iowa
- Conference: Big Ten

Biographical details
- Born: September 9, 1982 (age 44); Saint Thomas, U.S. Virgin Islands

Playing career
- 2001–2005: Iowa
- 2006–2007: Green Bay Packers
- 2008–2010: Cincinnati Bengals
- 2010: Carolina Panthers
- Position: Linebacker

Coaching career (HC unless noted)
- 2013–2014: Northeast High School (LB/STC)
- 2014–2015: Boyd Anderson HS (AHC, DC)
- 2018: Tennessee Titans (coaching intern)
- 2019–2021: South Dakota (LB, NFL Liaison)
- 2022–present: Iowa (TE)

Accomplishments and honors

Awards
- 2× First-team All-Big Ten (2003, 2004); Second-team All-Big Ten (2005)

Abdul Hodge (born September 9, 1982) is an American football coach and former player. He is currently the tight ends coach at Iowa, where he played as a 3-time all Big-Ten linebacker. He was drafted by the Green Bay Packers in the third round of the 2006 NFL draft.

== Early life ==
Hodge grew up in Fort Lauderdale, Florida and attended Boyd Anderson High School (the same school as college teammate offensive lineman David Walker) where he won four letters in football, two in track, and one in basketball. In football, he was a three-year starter, and three-time team captain.

Hodge played linebacker for a 9–3 team that reached the state semi-finals. he was selected as an All-American by SuperPrep, First-team All-State and All-Conference. He was also named Broward County MVP on defense.

In his high school career, Hodge recorded a total of 308 career tackles, 22 sacks and six interceptions. He also had eight fumble recoveries and fumbles turned for touchdowns. He had over 100 tackles in each of his final three prep seasons. Hodge's best time is 4.5 seconds in the 40-yard dash.

== College career ==
After being recruited by Iowa linebackers coach Bret Bielema, Hodge attended the University of Iowa, where he majored in communication studies and was a member of the National Honor Society. He was also one of five seniors selected to the 2005 Leadership Council and served as a captain that season. At Iowa, Hodge played under head coach Kirk Ferentz and defensive coordinator Norm Parker.

After redshirting in 2001, Hodge played in all 13 games of the Iowa's conference championship 2002 season, coming mostly on special teams and as a backup linebacker. In his first game as a Hawkeye, he recorded three solo tackles and three assists in the week one over Akron. He had six solo tackles and two assists in win over Purdue, and later had five solo tackles in win over Northwestern, including a quarterback sack and a quarterback pressure. Hodge recorded four solo tackles and two assists against USC in the Orange Bowl.

In 2003, Hodge started all 13 games of the season at middle linebacker, earning first-team all-Big Ten recognition and leading the conference in tackles as a sophomore. He finished the season with 141 tackles, 9 tackles for loss, 2 quarterback sacks, 2 forced fumbles, and 3 pass break-ups. At Ohio State, he recorded eight solo tackles and eight assists for career high 16 tackles. Hodge recorded five solo tackles in win over Penn State, and added a 47-yard fumble return and had one pass break-up. He recorded four solo tackles and four assists in Outback Bowl win over Florida.

In 2004, Hodge started all 12 games at linebacker, again earning first-team all-Big Ten honors with fellow Iowa linebacker Chad Greenway as the Hawkeyes were co-champions of the Big Ten. His season totals included a team-best 116 tackles, including 79 solo and 37 assists; Hodge also had 4.5 tackles for loss and three QB sacks, four pass break-ups, two fumble recoveries and one forced fumble. In the win over Wisconsin to clinch a share of the Big Ten title, Hodge led the team with 11 tackles, including seven solo. Hodge set a Capital One Bowl record in 2005 with 16 tackles against LSU.

In 2005, Hodge was named to several pre-season awards watchlists, including: the Bronko Nagurski Trophy watch list, the Lott Trophy watch list, the Dick Butkus Award watch list, and the Bednarik Award watch list. After the season, he earned all-Big Ten honors for the third time. He was named first-team defensive All-America by Phil Steele's College Football Preview, second-team All-America by Athlon Sports, second-team All-America by Rivals.com, third-team All-America by Nationalchamps.net, No. 4 inside linebacker by The Sporting News, and third-team All-America by collegesportsreport.com. In the win over Illinois he recorded a career-best 18 tackles, including 11 solo, to earn Big Ten Defensive Player of the week honors. Against Florida in the 2006 Outback Bowl, Hodge set an Iowa bowl record and Outback Bowl record with 19 tackles, including 14 solo, he also had one tackle for loss.

Hodge's 158 total tackles in 2005 ranked best for the team during the season, best in the Big Ten, second best all-time at Iowa for a single season, and third in the country.

While at Iowa, he led the Big Ten and ranked third in the nation in tackles per game, ranked third in the nation in solo tackles per game, tied for fifth in the Big Ten in forced fumbles, and tied for ninth in recovered fumbles. Hodge ranks third in career tackles with 453.

== Professional career ==
Pre-draft measurables
Height	Weight	Arm length	Hand span	40-yard dash	10-yard split	20-yard split	20-yard shuttle	Three-cone drill	Vertical jump	Broad jump	Bench press
6 ft 0 3/8 in (1.84 m)	236 lb (107 kg)	32 1/2 in (0.83 m)	8 7/8 in (0.23 m)	4.67 s	1.64 s	2.78 s	4.30 s	7.09 s	31.0 in (0.79 m)	9 ft 0 in (2.74 m)	25 reps
All values from NFL Combine/Pro Day

=== Green Bay Packers ===
Hodge was selected by the Green Bay Packers in the third round (67th overall) of the 2006 NFL draft. He scored his first NFL touchdown on a fumble recovery during his first career start against the Seattle Seahawks on November 27, 2006.

In 2007, Hodge was placed on injured reserve due to a knee injury. Hodge changed his number from 55 to his old college number of 52. He underwent surgery on both knees in an attempt to return to the club in 2008.

Hodge was cut by the Packers on August 30, 2008, during final cuts.

=== Cincinnati Bengals ===
Hodge was signed to the practice squad of the Cincinnati Bengals on September 16, 2008. On October 3, he was promoted to the active roster after the team waived cornerback Simeon Castille. Hodge appeared in six games for the Bengals, recording three tackles, before being placed on injured reserve with an arm injury on November 17. The Bengals cut Hodge on September 4, 2010.

=== Carolina Panthers ===
The Carolina Panthers signed Hodge on October 27, 2010. He appeared in five games for the Panthers.

=== Career statistics ===
Year	Team	Games	TKL	SCK	FF	FR	PD	INT	YDS	TD
2006	Green Bay Packers	8	10	0	0	1	2	0	0	1
2008	Cincinnati Bengals	6	3	0	0	0	0	0	0	0
2009	Cincinnati Bengals	16	16	0	1	0	0	0	0	0
2010	Carolina Panthers	5	5	0	0	0	0	0	0	0
Total	3	35	34	0.0	1	1	2	0	0	0

== Coaching career ==
Following his career in the NFL, Hodge founded Professional Interactive Solutions in his hometown of Fort Lauderdale, Florida. In addition to running the business, Hodge served as an assistant coach for several high schools in Sarasota, Florida, from 2013 to 2016, including Northeast High School and his alma mater Boyd Anderson High School. He served as head coach of GAIN sports in Sarasota from 2013 to 2016. In 2018, he served a coaching intern for the NFL's Tennessee Titans before joining the South Dakota staff in 2019 as linebackers coach and NFL liaison. In 2022, Hodge was hired by his collegiate alma mater Iowa as tight ends coach. Iowa still coached by Kirk Ferentz, who coached the team when Hodge played.

== See also ==
- List of NCAA major college football yearly tackles leaders
