= Danan Hughes =

American football player (born 1970)

No. 83
- Position: Wide receiver

Personal information
- Born: December 11, 1970 (age 55); Bayonne, New Jersey, U.S.
- Listed height: 6 ft 2 in (1.88 m)
- Listed weight: 205 lb (93 kg)

Career information
- High school: Bayonne
- College: Iowa
- NFL draft: 1993: 7th round, 186th overall pick

Career history
- Kansas City Chiefs (1993–1998); New Orleans Saints (1999)*
- * Offseason or practice squad member only

Career NFL statistics
- Receptions: 46
- Receiving yards: 425
- Receiving touchdowns: 4
- Stats at Pro Football Reference

Robert Danan Hughes (born December 11, 1970) is an American former professional football player who was a wide receiver for the Kansas City Chiefs of the National Football League (NFL). He played college football for the Iowa Hawkeyes. Hughes is a football analyst and commentates the weekly Missouri Valley Football Conference Game of the Week.

== Early life ==
Danan played as a wide receiver for Bayonne High School in New Jersey from 1984 to 1988.

== College career ==
Hughes spent his collegiate football career playing wide receiver for the University of Iowa from 1989 to 1992. After redshirting during the 1988 season, Hughes set a team record for freshman receiving yards with 471 yards on 28 receptions in 1989. That team record stood until the 2006 season when freshman Dominique Douglas passed Hughes to become Iowa’s all-time freshman receiving leader. Hughes ranks 3rd on Iowa’s all-time career receiving list, behind only Derrell Johnson-Koulianos with 168 receptions for 2,544 career yards and Tim Dwight, with 146 receptions for 2,216 career yards. His 21 career touchdown receptions are tied with Dwight for second most in team history behind Marvin McNutt.

Hughes, along with quarterback Matt Rodgers and the running tandem of Nick Bell and Tony Stewart, helped lead the Hawkeyes back to the 1991 Rose Bowl where Iowa lost to Washington 46–34. Iowa also was invited to the 1991 Holiday Bowl the next season in Danan’s junior year and played BYU to a 13–13 tie. On November 23, 1991, during the final game of the regular season, Hughes was on the receiving end of one of Matt Rodger’s 3 touchdown passes against Minnesota in the classic “Snow Game”. Danan celebrated by making a snow angel in the south end zone in Iowa's 23–8 victory which gave legendary coach Hayden Fry his 100th victory at Iowa. Hughes admitted in an interview on 1600 KGYM's "Balbinot and Brommelkamp" radio show in Cedar Rapids, Iowa, on September 27, 2011, the celebration was premeditated.

Danan Hughes also played outfield for the Hawkeye baseball team and was one of the best two-sport athletes in Iowa history. Hughes was selected in the 3rd round of the 1992 amateur baseball draft by the Milwaukee Brewers. Only two Hawkeye baseball players have been drafted higher since 1992.

== Professional career ==
Danan played minor league baseball for the 1992 and 1993 seasons in the Pioneer League for the Helena Brewers.

He decided to make football his full-time profession after college when the Kansas City Chiefs selected him in the seventh round of the 1993 NFL draft. Hughes played for the Chiefs from 1993 to 1998 as a wide receiver and special teams player.

== Broadcasting career ==
Since 2008, Hughes has also served as a college football and college baseball analyst for the Big Ten Network.

On July 17, 2020, it was announced that Danan would be joining the Kansas City Chiefs' radio broadcasting team as an analyst.
