= Ryan Donahue =

American football player (born 1988)

No. 6
- Position: Punter

Personal information
- Born: March 17, 1988 (age 38); Evergreen Park, Illinois, U.S.
- Listed height: 6 ft 2 in (1.88 m)
- Listed weight: 190 lb (86 kg)

Career information
- High school: Chicago (IL) St. Rita of Cascia
- College: Iowa
- NFL draft: 2011: undrafted

Career history
- Detroit Lions (2011–2012)

Awards and highlights
- Second-team All-Big Ten (2008)

Career NFL statistics
- Punts: 49
- Punting yards: 2,093
- Average: 42.7
- Stats at Pro Football Reference

Ryan Donahue (born March 17, 1988) is an American former professional football player who was a punter in the National Football League (NFL). He played college football for the Iowa Hawkeyes and was signed by the Lions as an undrafted free agent in 2011.

== Professional career ==
=== Detroit Lions ===
Donahue was placed on injured reserve on November 29, 2011 after suffering a quad injury. He was released by the Lions on August 31, 2012.
