= Marcus Coker =

American football player (born 1992)

No. 34
- Position: Running back

Personal information
- Born: May 11, 1992 (age 34); Beltsville, Maryland, U.S.
- Listed height: 6 ft 0 in (1.83 m)
- Listed weight: 230 lb (104 kg)

Career information
- College: Iowa (2010−2011); Stony Brook (2012−2013)

Awards and highlights
- Second Team All-Big Ten (2011)
- Stats at ESPN

Marcus Coker (born May 11, 1992) is an American former football running back for the Stony Brook Seawolves.

== Early life ==
Coker attended DeMatha Catholic High School in Hyattsville, Maryland. As a senior, he rushed 165 times for 1,698 yards with 23 touchdowns.

== College career ==
Coker attended the University of Iowa. As a true freshman in 2010 he rushed for 622 yards on 114 carries and had three touchdowns. He was the Offensive MVP of the 2010 Insight Bowl after rushing for 219 yards on 33 carries and two touchdowns.

During the 2011 regular season, Coker ranked second in the Big Ten Conference and 10th among all players in the NCAA Football Bowl Subdivision with 1,384 yards.

Coker was suspended from the 2011 Insight Bowl for unexplained “disciplinary reasons” according to a press release from the University of Iowa.

Coker transferred to Stony Brook University in spring 2012. The following season, he rushed 1,018 yards and scored nine touchdowns for the Seawolves. In 2013, he rushed for 193 yards and scored one touchdown before being sidelined by an abdominal injury. He was suspended for the first game of the 2014 season and then broke his leg in a motorcycle accident. His college career totals were 3,731 yards and 34 touchdowns.
