= Nick Gallery =

American football player (born 1975)

No. 3
- Position: Punter

Personal information
- Born: February 15, 1975 (age 51); Manchester, Iowa, U.S.
- Listed height: 6 ft 4 in (1.93 m)
- Listed weight: 245 lb (111 kg)

Career information
- High school: East Buchanan
- College: Iowa
- NFL draft: 1997: undrafted

Career history
- Kansas City Chiefs (1997)*; New York Jets (1997–1998); Philadelphia Eagles (1998)*; Miami Dolphins (1999)*; Frankfurt Galaxy (2000); Kansas City Chiefs (2000)*
- * Offseason or practice squad member only

Awards and highlights
- 2× First-team All-Big Ten (1995, 1996); Second-team All-Big Ten (1993)
- Stats at Pro Football Reference

Nick Patrick Gallery (born February 15, 1975) is an American former professional football player who was a punter for the New York Jets of the National Football League (NFL). He played college football for the Iowa Hawkeyes.

== Early life ==
Born in Manchester, Iowa, Gallery attended East Buchanan High School and joined the University of Iowa team in 1993. Gallery was the Hawkeyes' punter for all four years he was at the school, with 179 punts in 45 games and a 44.5 yards-per-punt average. He also caught a touchdown pass his sophomore year.

== Pro career ==
Gallery wasn't drafted and sat out the 1997 season. In 1998, however, he was signed by the New York Jets and beat out 37-year-old incumbent Brian Hansen during the preseason, thus becoming the Jets' punter for their opening game against the San Francisco 49ers. But things did not go smoothly for the rookie punter; his first kick went only 34 yards, and his second punt was shanked, landing out of bounds only 23 yards downfield. This earned what the New York Daily News termed "an evil stare" from coach Bill Parcells, and the strong field position led to a 49ers touchdown. Gallery punted four more times, and his best two were his last ones, in overtime: a 48-yarder to Niners return man R. W. McQuarters (who was tackled by Gallery himself) and a 49-yard punt that pinned San Francisco on their own four-yard-line. Unfortunately for New York, on the very next play Garrison Hearst ran 96 yards for a game-winning touchdown. Gallery finished with six punts for 39.7 average, well below his numbers at Iowa. It would be Gallery's only game in the NFL, as the Jets hurriedly re-signed Hansen and the rookie was released.

In 2000, Gallery was signed by the Frankfurt Galaxy of NFL Europe and became the Galaxy's regular punter, kicking 43 times for an unimpressive 39.4 average. He did not return to Frankfurt in 2001, but was selected by the Chicago Enforcers as a kicker (K) from Iowa with the 475th pick in the 2001 XFL inaugural draft. Gallery was the 475th—and last—player selected, making him the nascent league's own Mr. Irrelevant. He did not make the team, however, and his pro career came to an end.

Nick's younger brother Robert Gallery, after starring as a tackle in Iowa, was selected second overall in 2004 and played seven seasons for the Oakland Raiders, plus one for the Seattle Seahawks.

== Personal life ==
Nick lives in Mill Valley, CA with his wife, Taryn Goodman Gallery, and his daughter.
