= Ricky Stanzi =

American football player (born 1987)

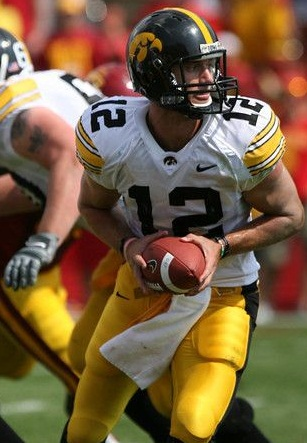
- Stanzi with the Iowa Hawkeyes in 2009

No. 2, 6, 12
- Position: Quarterback

Personal information
- Born: September 3, 1987 (age 39); Mentor, Ohio, U.S.
- Listed height: 6 ft 4 in (1.93 m)
- Listed weight: 228 lb (103 kg)

Career information
- High school: Lake Catholic (Mentor)
- College: Iowa (2006–2010)
- NFL draft: 2011: 5th round, 135th overall pick

Career history
- Kansas City Chiefs (2011–2012); Jacksonville Jaguars (2013); Houston Texans (2014)*; New York Giants (2015)*; Detroit Lions (2015)*; Calgary Stampeders (2017–2018)
- * Offseason or practice squad member only
- Stats at Pro Football Reference
- Stats at CFL.ca

Richard Joseph Stanzi (born September 3, 1987) is an American former football quarterback. He played college football for the Iowa Hawkeyes and was selected by the Kansas City Chiefs in the fifth round of the 2011 NFL draft. He was on the active rosters of both the Chiefs and Jacksonville Jaguars but did not appear in a game. Stanzi later played for the Calgary Stampeders of the Canadian Football League (CFL).

== Early life ==
Born and raised in Mentor, Ohio, Stanzi went to Lake Catholic High School in Mentor and was rated a 3 star recruit. He accepted a scholarship offer from the University of Iowa to play quarterback.

== College career ==
Stanzi posted 26–9 (.743) record as starting quarterback. Additionally, Stanzi also posted a 6–3 record against ranked opponents, including a 3–0 mark against top-5 opponents in his career. Notable wins include going 3–0 over Joe Paterno' Penn State teams and 3–0 over Kirk Cousins' Michigan State teams.

Stanzi took over as starter at Iowa as a sophomore beginning in the 2008 season. He completed 150 passes for 1,956 yards with 14 touchdowns.

On November 7, 2009, during his junior season, Stanzi was replaced by James Vandenberg after suffering a sprained right ankle. It was later confirmed that Stanzi had surgery on his ankle. Stanzi returned at the conclusion of the season to lead Iowa to an Orange Bowl victory over Georgia Tech. Stanzi ended up passing for 2,417 yards and 17 touchdowns in his junior season – completing 56.2 percent of his attempts.

Stanzi was 14–4 in his career as Iowa's starter going into his senior season, and in July 2010, Stanzi was named to the 2010 Davey O'Brien National Quarterback Award and Manning Award watch lists. He was also a finalist for The 2010 Premier Player of College Football Trophy which is awarded based on fan votes.

Stanzi returned to Iowa in 2010 with nine touchdowns and no interceptions through his first four games. He completed 19-of-25 passes with three passing touchdowns on September 24, 2010.

One of Stanzi's most memorable moments of the 2010 season occurred on November 6 in a game against Indiana, in which he connected with Marvin McNutt for a 52-yard touchdown which put Iowa up 18–13 with 2:56 remaining in the game. Stanzi put up big numbers in the 2010 season with a 167.2 quarterback rating along with 22 touchdowns. Stanzi ranked third in the nation in passing efficiency.

Stanzi graduated from Iowa in December 2010 with a B.A. in interdepartmental studies from the College of Liberal Arts and Sciences.

=== College statistics ===
Year	Team	Attempts	Completions	Completion %	Yards	TDs	INT
2006	Iowa	Redshirt					
2007	Iowa	4	0	0.0%	0	0	0
2008	Iowa	254	150	59.1%	1,956	14	9
2009	Iowa	304	171	56.3%	2,417	17	15
2010	Iowa	345	221	64.1%	3,004	25	6
Totals		907	542	59.8%	7,377	56	30

== Professional career ==
Pre-draft measurables
Height	Weight	Arm length	Hand span	Wingspan	40-yard dash	10-yard split	20-yard split	20-yard shuttle	Three-cone drill	Vertical jump	Broad jump	Wonderlic
6 ft 4 3/8 in (1.94 m)	223 lb (101 kg)	32 in (0.81 m)	10 in (0.25 m)	6 ft 4 3/8 in (1.94 m)	4.89 s	1.66 s	2.85 s	4.43 s	6.95 s	32.5 in (0.83 m)	9 ft 7 in (2.92 m)	30
All values from NFL Combine/Pro Day

=== Kansas City Chiefs ===
Stanzi was selected in the fifth round with the 135th pick in the 2011 NFL draft by the Kansas City Chiefs. Stanzi was activated for the first time in his NFL career for the Chiefs against the New England Patriots on November 21, 2011. At the end of the 2011 NFL season, Stanzi was second-string behind Kyle Orton.

Stanzi was expected to be the backup to Matt Cassel, and competed in the 2012 preseason with Brady Quinn, who was signed by the Chiefs on March 17, 2012. However, Quinn eventually won the number two spot.

Stanzi was released by the Chiefs on August 25, 2013.

=== Jacksonville Jaguars ===
The Jacksonville Jaguars claimed Stanzi off waivers on August 27, 2013. He was released on September 28 and re-signed on September 30. The Jaguars released Stanzi on August 29, 2014.

=== Houston Texans ===
The Houston Texans signed Stanzi to their practice squad on December 16, 2014.

=== New York Giants ===
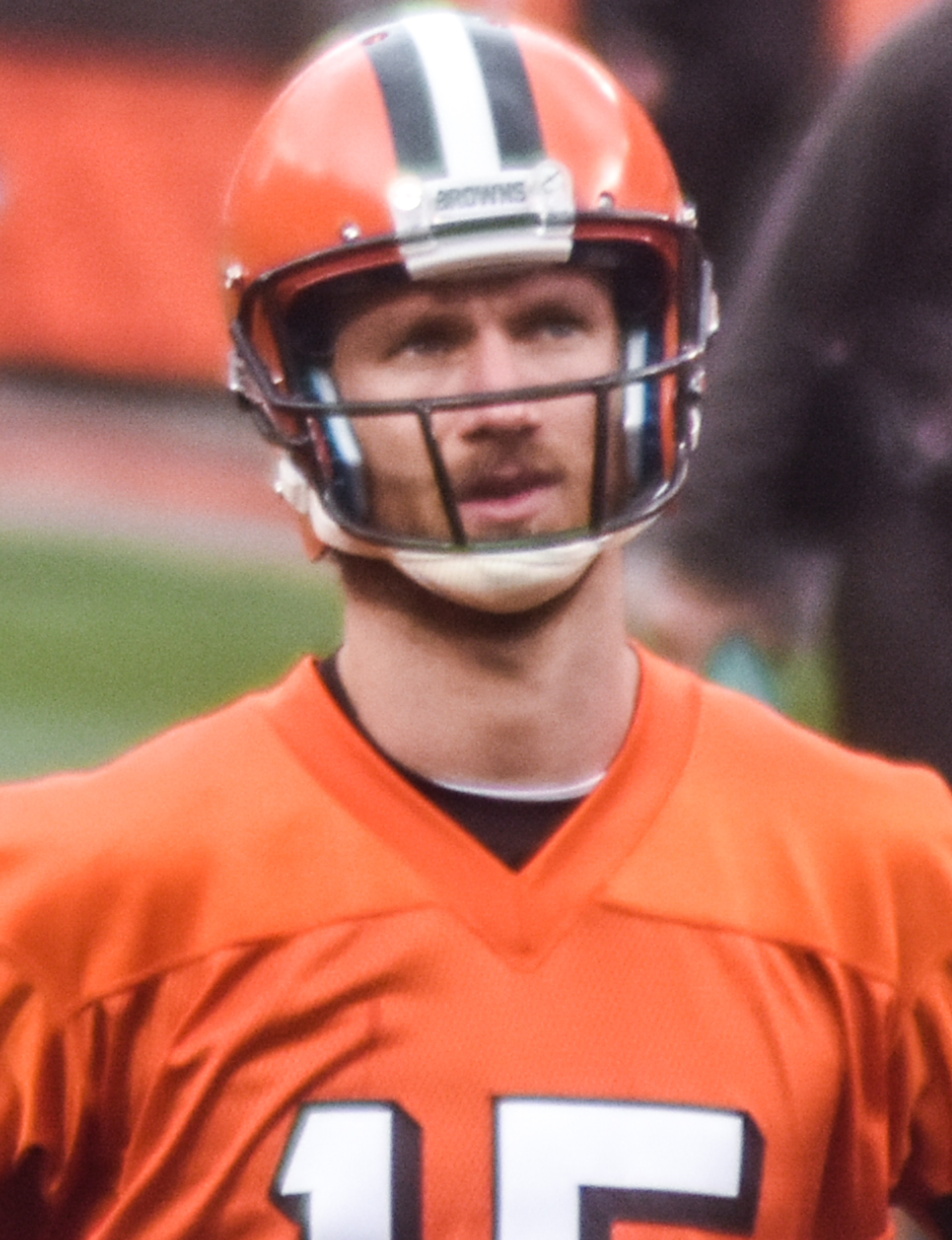
Stanzi trying out for the Cleveland Browns in 2016

The New York Giants signed Stanzi to a Reserve/Future contract on January 8, 2015. On September 5, 2015, he was waived by the Giants.

=== Detroit Lions ===
The Detroit Lions signed Stanzi to their practice squad on September 8, 2015.

=== Calgary Stampeders ===
Stanzi participated in rookie minicamp on a tryout basis with the Cleveland Browns in 2016. However, he went unsigned, and spent 2016 out of football. In April 2017, Stanzi participated in The Spring League, a developmental football league intended to provide a platform for free agents to be seen by scouts. Following the Spring League games, Stanzi signed with the Calgary Stampeders of the CFL on May 16, where he competed to be the backup quarterback to Bo Levi Mitchell, a role which was held by fellow Iowa alumnus Drew Tate the previous season. During the two-game CFL preseason, Stanzi completed 13 of 18 passes for 129 yards and a touchdown, and added one rush for 14 yards. Stanzi officially was named to the regular season active roster for the Stampeders on June 17. On July 29, 2017, against the Hamilton Tiger-Cats, Stanzi made his professional regular season debut when he entered during garbage time of Calgary's 60–1 victory. Stanzi's first CFL pass attempt was a completion to receiver Anthony Parker. Stanzi finished the game with one completion on two attempts, for five yards. Stanzi finished the year with 4 completions on 8 attempts for 53 yards, no touchdowns, and two interceptions, all of his playing time coming during garbage time. The Stampeders advanced to the 105th Grey Cup, but were defeated by the Toronto Argonauts. Stanzi's opposing quarterback during the Spring League, McLeod Bethel-Thompson, who likewise spent 2017 as a CFL backup, was a member of the victorious Argonauts roster.
