= Nick Bell (American football) =

American football player (born 1968)

No. 38
- Position: Running back

Personal information
- Born: August 19, 1968 (age 58); San Francisco, California, U.S.
- Listed height: 6 ft 4 in (1.93 m)
- Listed weight: 255 lb (116 kg)

Career information
- High school: Ed W. Clark (Las Vegas, Nevada)
- College: Iowa (1987–1990)
- NFL draft: 1991: 2nd round, 43rd overall pick

Career history
- Los Angeles Raiders (1991–1993)

Awards and highlights
- Big Ten Most Valuable Player (1990); Big Ten Co-Offensive Player of the Year (1990); First-team All-Big Ten (1990)

Career NFL statistics
- Rushing yards: 853
- Rushing average: 3.8
- Rushing touchdowns: 7
- Receptions: 21
- Receiving yards: 213
- Stats at Pro Football Reference

H. Nickolas Bell (born August 19, 1968) is an American former professional football player who was a running back for three seasons with the Los Angeles Raiders of the National Football League (NFL). He played college football for the Iowa Hawkeyes and was selected by the Raiders in the second round of the 1991 NFL draft with the 43rd overall pick.

== Coaching career ==
Bell moved to Cedar Rapids, Iowa and was an assistant coach for the Cedar Rapids Semi-Pro football team from 1998 to 1999.

== Personal life ==
Bell's nephew is Quinton Bell.
