= Mike Meyer (American football) =

American football player (born 1992)

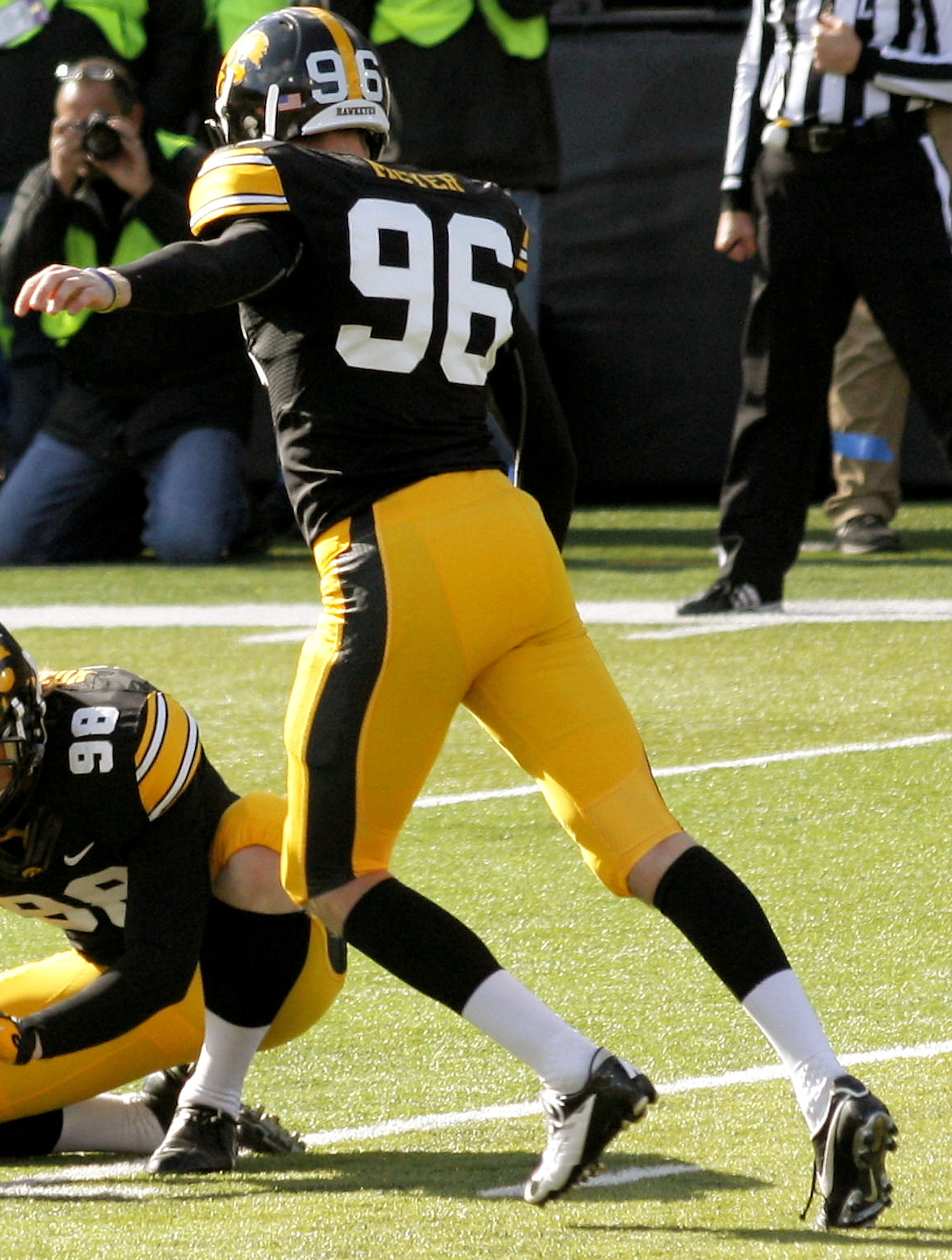
- Meyer in 2013

Profile
- Position: Kicker

Personal information
- Born: June 2, 1992 (age 34); Dubuque, Iowa
- Listed height: 6 ft 2 in (1.88 m)
- Listed weight: 190 lb (86 kg)

Career information
- High school: Dubuque (IA) Wahlert Catholic
- College: Iowa
- NFL draft: 2015: undrafted

Career history
- Tennessee Titans (2015)*; Atlanta Falcons (2017)*; Jacksonville Jaguars (2017)*
- * Offseason or practice squad member only

Awards and highlights
- Second-team All-Big Ten (2013)

Michael Lee Meyer (born June 2, 1992) is an American former football placekicker. He played college football at Iowa.

== College career ==
Meyer played for the Iowa Hawkeyes from 2010 to 2013.

== Professional career ==
=== Tennessee Titans ===
Meyer was signed by the Tennessee Titans as an undrafted free agent on May 11, 2015. He was waived by the team on August 30, 2015.

=== Atlanta Falcons ===
On January 10, 2017, Meyer signed a futures contract with the Atlanta Falcons. He was waived on September 1, 2017. He was re-signed to the practice squad on October 11, 2017. He was released on October 17, 2017. He was re-signed to the practice squad on November 8, 2017, but was released six days later.

=== Jacksonville Jaguars ===
On November 23, 2017, Meyer was signed to the Jacksonville Jaguars' practice squad, but was released four days later.
