= Jordan Canzeri =

American football player (born 1993)

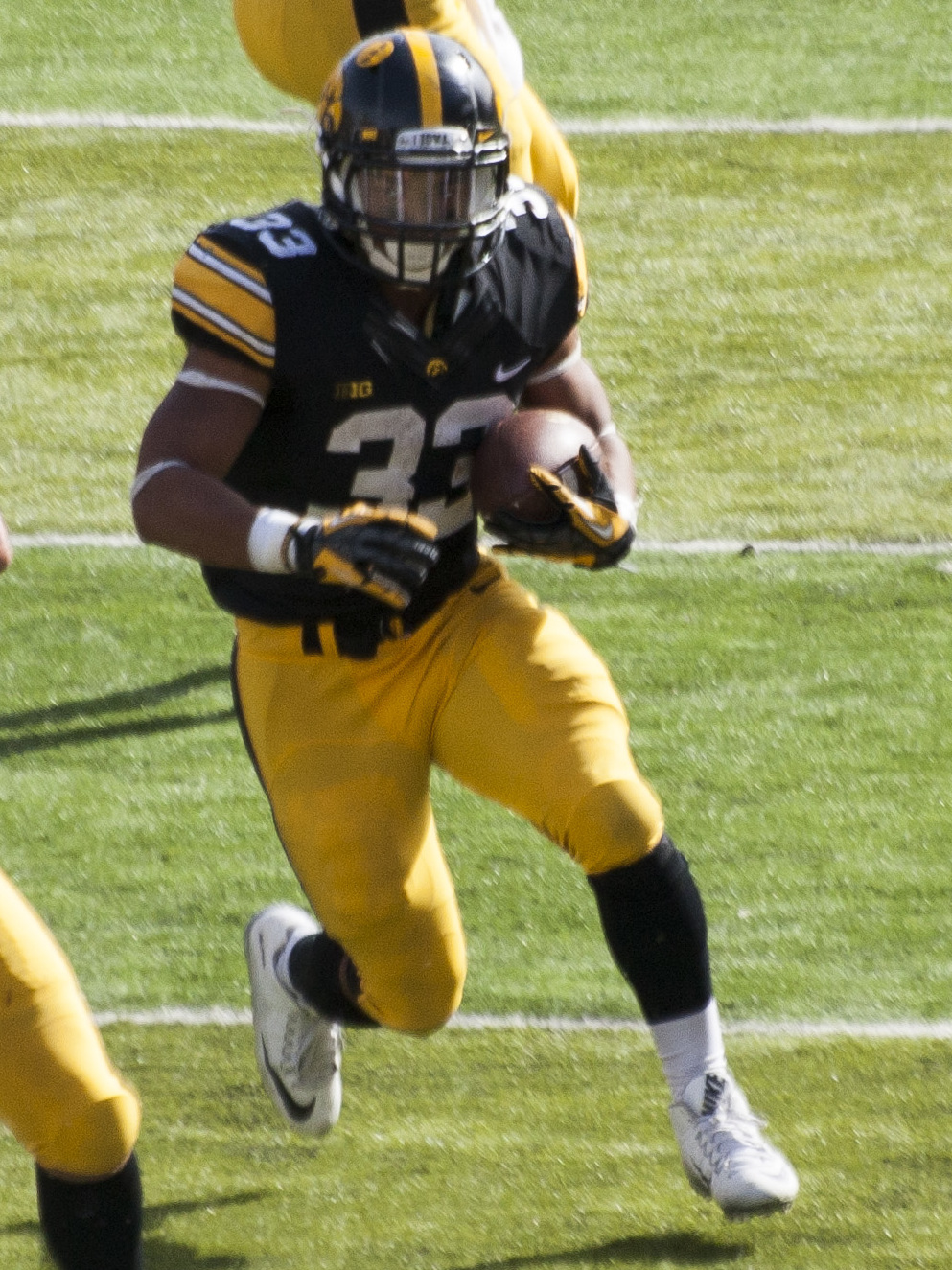

No. 33
- Position: Running back

Personal information
- Born: February 18, 1993 (age 33); Troy, New York, U.S.
- Listed height: 5 ft 8 in (1.73 m)
- Listed weight: 190 lb (86 kg)

Career information
- High school: Troy
- College: Iowa
- NFL draft: 2016: undrafted

Career history
- Elecom Kobe Finies (2016–2017); Albany Empire (2018)*
- * Offseason or practice squad member only
- Stats at Pro Football Reference

Jordan Canzeri (born February 18, 1993) is an American former football running back. He played college football for the Iowa Hawkeyes from 2011 to 2015. He rushed for a career-high 256 yards on a school-record 43 carries against Illinois on October 10, 2015. He helped lead the 2015 Hawkeyes team to an undefeated 12–0 record during the regular season, as he rushed for 976 yards during the season. He was selected by both the coaches and media as a third-team player on the 2015 All-Big Ten Conference football team. He played for the Elecom Kobe Finies of the X-League from 2016 to 2017. On March 19, 2018, Canzeri was assigned to the Albany Empire. On March 31, 2018, he was placed on recallable reassignment.

== College career ==
=== Statistics ===
Year	Team	Rushing				Receiving			
Year	Team	Att	Yards	Avg	TD	Rec	Yards	Avg	TD
2011	Iowa	31	114	3.7	0	6	28	4.7	1
2013	Iowa	74	481	6.5	2	4	61	15.3	0
2014	Iowa	102	494	4.8	0	9	123	13.7	1
2015	Iowa	183	984	5.4	12	20	208	10.4	1
Career		390	2,073	5.3	14	39	420	10.8	3

== Professional career ==
Pre-draft measurables
Height	Weight	Arm length	Hand span	40-yard dash	10-yard split	20-yard split	20-yard shuttle	Three-cone drill	Vertical jump	Broad jump	Bench press
5 ft 7 3/4 in (1.72 m)	190 lb (86 kg)	29 1/8 in (0.74 m)	8 1/2 in (0.22 m)	4.49 s	1.58 s	2.64 s	4.17 s	6.81 s	34.5 in (0.88 m)	9 ft 4 in (2.84 m)	20 reps
All values from Pro Day
