= 2010 Insight Bowl =

- 22nd Insight Bowl
Missouri Tigers	Iowa Hawkeyes
(10–2)	(7–5)
Big 12	Big Ten
24	27
Head coach: Gary Pinkel	Head coach: Kirk Ferentz
AP / Coaches / BCS; 14 / 14 / 12
	1	2	3	4	Total
Missouri	3	7	14	0	24
Iowa	7	10	3	7	27
- Date: December 28, 2010
- Season: 2010
- Stadium: Sun Devil Stadium
- Location: Tempe, Arizona
- MVP: Marcus Coker (Iowa); Micah Hyde (Iowa)
- Favorite: Missouri by 3
- Referee: Tom McCabe (MAC)
- Attendance: 53,453
- Payout: US$1,200,000 per team

United States TV coverage
- Network: ESPN
- Announcers: Sean McDonough (play-by-play); Matt Millen (analyst); Heather Cox (sideline reporter)
- Nielsen ratings: 2.24

The 2010 Insight Bowl was the 22nd edition of the Insight Bowl, a college football bowl game, played at Sun Devil Stadium in Tempe, Arizona on Tuesday, December 28, 2010. It featured the Missouri Tigers from the Big 12 Conference versus the Iowa Hawkeyes from the Big Ten Conference.

== Teams ==
This was the first meeting of the teams since 1910, when Missouri refused to take the field if Archie Alexander, the black starting tackle for Iowa travelled to Columbia. Prior to this game, Iowa and Missouri had previously met 12 times, all coming between 1892 and 1910, with Missouri holding a 7–5 lead in the series.

=== Missouri ===
The Tigers entered the bowl with a 10–2 record. Midway through the season, Missouri looked like it might be making a beeline for the BCS, sitting at 7–0 and favored in its final four games. The Tigers stumbled, following a loss to Nebraska with another at Texas Tech, but rebounded to win its final three games and finish at 10–2 for the program's third 10-win season in four years, bringing the program to its fourth such season ever. Much to the disappointment to many fans, Missouri would later make their second appearance in the Insight Bowl. They were a 34–31 winner over West Virginia in the 1998 game.

=== Iowa ===
Iowa looked to end its season on a high note in making its first appearance at the Insight Bowl. The Hawkeyes started off the season with a No. 9 ranking in the preseason AP poll. They had dominating wins over No. 22 Penn State and No. 5 Michigan State – the Spartans only loss in the regular season. But Iowa lost 4 of their last 6 regular season games by a total of 11 points, including a season-ending 27–24 loss at 2–9 Minnesota. The Hawkeyes won their previous two bowl games and were coming off with a 24–14 win in the Orange Bowl over Georgia Tech, giving the Hawkeyes their first BCS bowl win in school history.

== Weather ==
57 deg (F), wind: W at 3 mph, 47% humidity

== Game summary ==
=== Scoring ===
Scoring Play	Score
1st Quarter
IOWA – Marcus Coker 1-yard run (Michael Meyer kick), 10:32	IOWA 7–0
MIZZ – Grant Ressel 23-yard kick, 3:53	IOWA 7–3
2nd Quarter
IOWA – Marcus Coker 62-yard run (Michael Meyer kick), 13:26	IOWA 14–3
IOWA – Michael Meyer 34-yard kick, 7:28	IOWA 17–3
MIZZ – Henry Josey 10-yard run (Grant Ressel kick), 4:51	IOWA 17–10
3rd Quarter
IOWA – Michael Meyer 21 yard kick, 7:03	IOWA 20–10
MIZZ – Blaine Gabbert 7-yard run (Grant Ressel kick), 4:34	IOWA 20–17
MIZZ – Blaine Gabbert 3-yard pass to Michael Egnew (Grant Ressel kick), 0:54	MIZZ 24–20
4th Quarter
IOWA – Micah Hyde 72-yard interception return (Michael Meyer kick), 5:32	IOWA 27–24

=== Team statistics ===
Statistics

Statistic	Missouri	Iowa
First Downs	32	19
Rush	10	9
Pass	20	8
Penalty	2	2
Total Offense	512	425
Total Plays	86	58
Average Gain per Play	6.0	7.3
Net Yards Rushing	78	225
Rushing attempts	29	37
Average per Rush	2.7	6.1
Rushing Touchdowns	2	2
Yards Gained Rushing	118	230
Yards Lost Rushing	40	5
Net Yards Passing	434	200
Comp.-Attempts-INT	41–57–2	11–12–2
Average per Attempt	7.6	9.5
Average per Comp.	10.6	18.2
Passing Touchdowns	1	0
Kickoffs-Yards	5–340	6–400
Average Yards Per Kickoff	68.0	66.7
Net Yards per Kickoff	40.4	49.7
Touchbacks	1	1
Kick Returns-Yds-Average	5–82–16.4	4–118–29.5
Field Goals-Att-Long	1–1–23	2–2–34
Punts-Yds-Average-Long	4–168–42.0–55	3–134–44.7–47
3rd Down Conversions	8–15	6–11
4th Down Conversions	0–1	0–0
Sacks by: Number-Yds	0–0	2–16
Fumbles-Interceptions-Yds-TDs	0–2–25–0	0–2–72–1
Penalties-Yds	5–48	3–19
Time of Possession	29:49	29:23

== Notes ==
Iowa and Missouri had previously played each other 12 times with Missouri holding a 7–5 advantage. However, the most recent previous time that the schools had met was in 1910. The two squads had never faced each other in a bowl game.

The two teams played again in the 2024 TransPerfect Music City Bowl, a 27-24 Missouri win.
