= Norm Parker =

American football player and coach (1941–2014)

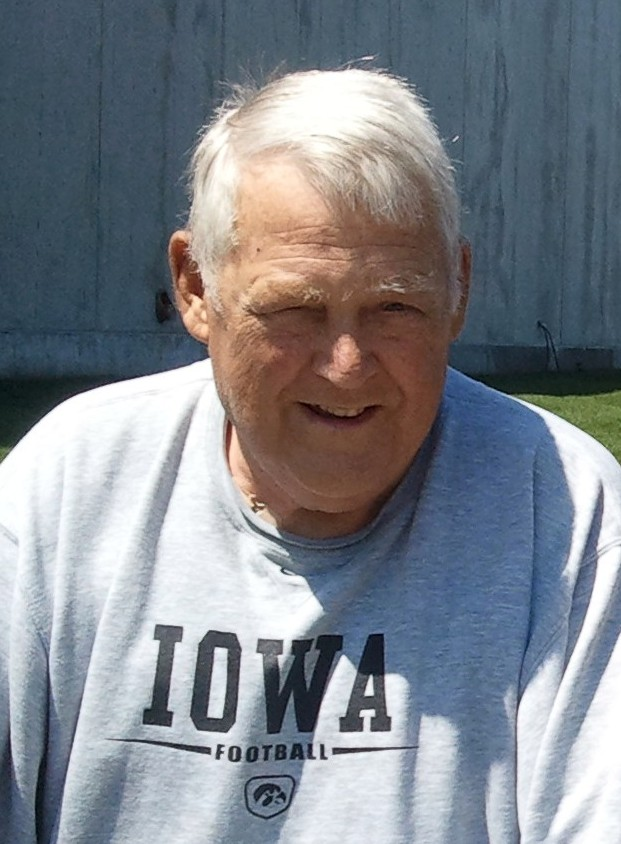
- Parker in 2012

Biographical details
- Born: October 9, 1941; Hazel Park, Michigan, U.S.
- Died: January 13, 2014 (aged 72); Iowa City, Iowa, U.S.

Playing career
- 1960-1963: Eastern Michigan

Coaching career (HC unless noted)
- 1968: Eastern Michigan (OL)
- 1969–1971: Wake Forest (WR/TE)
- 1972–1976: Minnesota (DL)
- 1977–1979: Illinois (OLB)
- 1980–1982: East Carolina (DC)
- 1983–1987: Michigan State (OLB)
- 1988–1994: Michigan State (OLB/DC)
- 1995–1996: Vanderbilt (LB)
- 1997–1998: Vanderbilt (DC/LB)
- 1999–2011: Iowa (DC/LB)

Accomplishments and honors

Awards
- AFCA Assistant Coach of the Year (2011)

Norm Parker (October 9, 1941 – January 13, 2014) was an American football coach. He was the defensive coordinator of the Iowa Hawkeyes from 1999 to 2011.

In 2005, Parker was a finalist for the Broyles Award, given annually to the nation's top college football assistant coach. He also was a coach at Eastern Michigan, Wake Forest, Minnesota, Illinois, East Carolina, Michigan State and Vanderbilt. In 2011, he was the AFCA Assistant Coach of the Year.

He died in 2014 at the University of Iowa Hospital, aged 72.
