= James Vandenberg =

American football player (born 1989)

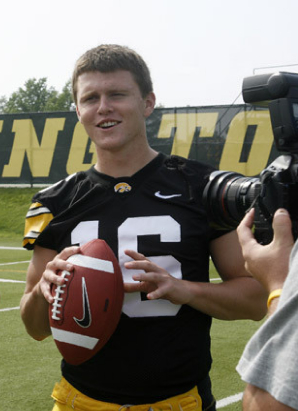
- Vandenberg with the Iowa Hawkeyes in 2009

No. 16
- Position: Quarterback

Personal information
- Born: November 24, 1989 (age 36)
- Listed height: 6 ft 3 in (1.91 m)
- Listed weight: 226 lb (103 kg)

Career information
- High school: Keokuk (IA)
- College: Iowa
- NFL draft: 2013: undrafted

Career history
- Minnesota Vikings (2013)*
- * Offseason or practice squad member only

Awards and highlights
- Third-team All-American; Iowa Class-3A Player of the Year

James Vandenberg (born November 24, 1989) is an American former football quarterback. He was signed as an undrafted free agent by the Minnesota Vikings in 2013. He played college football at Iowa.

== Early life ==
Vandenberg went to Keokuk High School in Keokuk, Iowa. While in high school, Vandenberg was the most prolific passer in Iowa high school history. He ranks sixth all-time nationally in single season completion percentage, and tenth nationally in career completion percentage. He holds 10 different Iowa high school passing records, including career touchdown passes and single season touchdown passes. In 2007, he led Keokuk to their first and only State Championship in football, winning the 3A title in a 42-7 blowout of Sioux City Heelan.

College recruiting
Name	Hometown	School	Height	Weight	40^{‡}	Commit date
James Vandenberg; QB	Keokuk, Iowa	Keokuk High School	6 ft 2 in (1.88 m)	176 lb (80 kg)	4.80	Dec 7, 2007
James Vandenberg; QB	Recruit ratings: Scout: Rivals:					
Overall recruit ranking: Scout: 50 (QB) Rivals: -- (QB), 5 (IA)
‡ Refers to 40-yard dash; Note: In many cases, Scout, Rivals, 247Sports, On3, and ESPN may conflict in their listings of height, weight and 40 time.; In these cases, the average was taken. ESPN grades are on a 100-point scale.; Sources: "2008 Team Ranking". Rivals.com.

Vandenberg committed to the University of Iowa on December 7, 2007. Vandenberg also had scholarship offers from the University of Nebraska–Lincoln, Northern Illinois University, and University of Northern Iowa.

== College career ==
After a year as a redshirt freshman, Vandenberg made his first career start for the Hawkeyes on November 14, 2009, against the Ohio State Buckeyes, stepping in for Ricky Stanzi who suffered a season-ending ankle injury the week before. In his first game as a starter, Vandenberg faced off against Terrelle Pryor of the Buckeyes in a game that determined the Big Ten Conference title. The Buckeyes won the game, 27–24, in overtime. Vandenberg led the Hawkeyes through the end of the regular season. The Hawkeyes finished with an 11–2 record and a spot in the Orange Bowl against the Georgia Tech Yellow Jackets.

=== Passing statistics ===
Year	Team	Attempts	Completions	Completion %	Yards	TDs	INT
2008	Iowa	Redshirt					
2009	Iowa	87	42	48.3%	470	2	5
2010	Iowa	8	5	62.5%	45	1	0
2011	Iowa	404	237	58.7%	3,022	25	7
2012	Iowa	389	223	57.3%	2,249	7	8
College totals		888	507	57.1%	5,786	35	20

== Professional career ==
Pre-draft measurables
Height	Weight	Arm length	Hand span	40-yard dash	10-yard split	20-yard split	20-yard shuttle	Three-cone drill	Vertical jump	Broad jump
6 ft 2 3/4 in (1.90 m)	226 lb (103 kg)	30 1/4 in (0.77 m)	9 3/4 in (0.25 m)	4.92 s	1.77 s	2.89 s	4.33 s	6.95 s	34.0 in (0.86 m)	9 ft 8 in (2.95 m)
All values from NFL Combine/Pro Day

Vandenberg signed as an undrafted free agent for the Minnesota Vikings on April 27, 2013. Vandenberg was released by the Vikings on August 26, 2013 (along with 12 others) to get to a 75-man roster.
