= Kahlil Hill =

American gridiron football player (born 1979)

Profile
- Position: Wide receiver

Personal information
- Born: March 18, 1979 (age 47); Iowa City, Iowa, U.S.

Career information
- College: University of Iowa
- NFL draft: 2002: 6th round, 184th overall pick

Career history
- 2002: Atlanta Falcons
- 2002: New Orleans Saints*
- 2002: Detroit Lions*
- 2003: Seattle Seahawks*
- 2003-2004: San Francisco 49ers*
- 2004-2005: Buffalo Bills*
- 2005: Jacksonville Jaguars*
- 2005: Hamilton Tiger-Cats
- 2006: Jacksonville Jaguars*
- 2006: Hamilton Tiger-Cats
- 2007: Saskatchewan Roughriders
- 2008: BC Lions
- * Offseason or practice squad member only

Awards and highlights
- Grey Cup champion (2007)
- Stats at Pro Football Reference
- Stats at CFL.ca

Kahlil Hill (born March 18, 1979) is an American former professional football wide receiver. He was drafted 184th overall in the sixth round of the 2002 NFL Draft. He has played for the Atlanta Falcons, New Orleans Saints, Detroit Lions, Buffalo Bills, and Jacksonville Jaguars of the National Football League (NFL) and the Saskatchewan Roughriders, Hamilton Tiger-Cats, and BC Lions of the Canadian Football League (CFL).
