= Kevin Kasper =

American football player (born 1977)

No. 82, 87, 11, 10, 83
- Position: Wide receiver

Personal information
- Born: December 23, 1977 (age 48); Hinsdale, Illinois, U.S.
- Listed height: 6 ft 1 in (1.85 m)
- Listed weight: 200 lb (91 kg)

Career information
- High school: Hinsdale South (Darien, Illinois)
- College: Iowa (1997–2000)
- NFL draft: 2001: 6th round, 190th overall pick

Career history
- Denver Broncos (2001–2002); Seattle Seahawks (2002); Arizona Cardinals (2002–2003); New England Patriots (2004); Houston Texans (2005)*; Chicago Rush (2005)*; Seattle Seahawks (2006)*; Minnesota Vikings (2006)*; Detroit Lions (2006); Detroit Lions (2007)*; Cleveland Browns (2008)
- * Offseason or practice squad member only

Awards and highlights
- Super Bowl champion (XXXIX); Second-team All-Big Ten (2000)

Career NFL statistics
- Receptions: 24
- Receiving yards: 287
- Receiving TDs: 3
- Stats at Pro Football Reference

Kevin Joseph Kasper (born December 23, 1977) is an American former professional football player who was a wide receiver in the National Football League (NFL). He was selected by the Denver Broncos in the sixth round of the 2001 NFL draft. He played college football for the Iowa Hawkeyes.

Kasper was also a member of the Seattle Seahawks, Arizona Cardinals, New England Patriots, Houston Texans, Minnesota Vikings, Detroit Lions, and Cleveland Browns.

== Early life ==
Kasper graduated from Hinsdale South High School in Darien, Illinois, and Burr Ridge Middle School in Burr Ridge, Illinois. He was a letterman in football, wrestling, and track. In football, as a senior, Kasper was named the Team MVP, won first-team All-Conference and first-team All-Area honors, and helped in leading his team to a 7 win-3 loss record.

== College career ==
Kasper originally walked on at the University of Iowa but left as the school's all-time receptions leader for a game, a season and a career. He graduated with a degree in marketing.

He finished his career with 157 catches for 1,974 yards and 11 touchdowns. As a senior, in 2000, he had 1,010 yards and 7 touchdowns receiving.

== Professional career ==
Pre-draft measurables
Height	Weight	Arm length	Hand span	40-yard dash	10-yard split	20-yard split	20-yard shuttle	Three-cone drill	Vertical jump	Broad jump
6 ft 0 in (1.83 m)	199 lb (90 kg)	30 1/2 in (0.77 m)	9 1/2 in (0.24 m)	4.42 s	1.54 s	2.57 s	3.73 s	6.56 s	43.5 in (1.10 m)	10 ft 6 in (3.20 m)
All values from NFL Combine

Kevin Kasper ran the 20-Yard Shuttle at an NFL Combine record 3.73 seconds, which led him to be selected by the Denver Broncos of the NFL in the sixth round (190th overall) in the 2001 NFL draft out of the University of Iowa. That combine record is still standing as of the 2026 NFL Combine. On October 29, 2002 the Broncos waived Kasper, who was then picked up off waivers by the Seattle Seahawks the next day. He would later go on to play for the Arizona Cardinals, Houston Texans, Detroit Lions, Minnesota Vikings, New England Patriots, and Cleveland Browns.

== Personal life ==
Kasper's son is a wide receiver at BYU.

== See also ==
- List of Arena Football League and National Football League players
