= Marvin McNutt =

American football player and coach (born 1989)

No. 83, 15
- Position: Wide receiver

Personal information
- Born: July 4, 1989 (age 37); St. Louis, Missouri, U.S.
- Listed height: 6 ft 4 in (1.93 m)
- Listed weight: 216 lb (98 kg)

Career information
- High school: Hazelwood Central (Florissant, Missouri)
- College: Iowa (2007–2011)
- NFL draft: 2012: 6th round, 194th overall pick

Career history

Playing
- Philadelphia Eagles (2012); Miami Dolphins (2013)*; Carolina Panthers (2013); Washington Redskins (2014)*
- * Offseason or practice squad member only

Coaching
- Cedar Rapids Titans (2017); Coe (2022–present)

Operations
- Cedar Rapids Titans (2018) General manager

Awards and highlights
- Big Ten Receiver of the Year (2011); First-team All-Big Ten (2011); Second-team All-Big Ten (2010)
- Stats at Pro Football Reference

Marvin McNutt, Jr. (born July 4, 1989) is an American former professional football wide receiver and current wide receivers coach at Coe College in Cedar Rapids, Iowa. He played college football for the Iowa Hawkeyes, where he became the all-time leader in receiving touchdowns and yardage (single season & career). He was selected by the Philadelphia Eagles in the sixth round of the 2012 NFL draft. McNutt was also the head coach of the Cedar Rapids Titans of the Indoor Football League (IFL) for the 2017 season, and the general manager in 2018.

== Early life ==
Marvin was born to Anita and Marvin McNutt on the Fourth of July in 1989. McNutt attended Hazelwood Central High School (located in Florissant, Missouri), where he reports having a GPA of 3.2 and an ACT composite score of 20. He was a star percussionist alongside Daniel Wittels in middle school.

In addition to football, McNutt also lettered in baseball and basketball. He was listed as a division one recruit in not just football, but also basketball. McNutt said he was offered scholarships from Southern Illinois University, Missouri State University and Indiana State University. Despite the offers, McNutt said, "My future is in football and if I go to a major college with a football scholarship, I won't be playing any basketball in college."

McNutt earned honorable mention all-conference laurels as a sophomore and as his high school career developed, he continued to stand out. McNutt was named a starter six games into the regular season of his junior year, with Hazlewood Central struggling. Coach John Pukala was upset with the team's (3–3) record and put the fate of the team on the shoulders of his backup. McNutt quickly established himself as a dominant player. His statistics did not at all support the fact that he only played seven games. With 79 pass completions in 157 attempts, he recorded 1,239 yards, 12 touchdowns and just four interceptions. He also rushed 14 times for 76 yards and two touchdowns, and caught two passes for 28 yards. McNutt's stellar work propelled the Hazelwood Central Hawks into the state championship where they were defeated 48–31 by De Smet Jesuit High School.

At the end of the season McNutt was listed second-team all-state. But, McNutt did not stop there as he continued to impress during his senior year. McNutt threw for 1,605 yards along with 15 touchdowns off of 90 completions in 162 pass attempts and only six interceptions. McNutt secured himself as a scrambler as he rushed for 337 yards and eight touchdowns. The powerhouse quarterback raised the eyebrows of several Division I colleges. He received scholarship offers from Iowa, Indiana, Kansas, Minnesota, Wisconsin, Nebraska and Missouri.

== College career ==
McNutt decided to accept the University of Iowa's scholarship offer as quarterback, and was redshirted. McNutt saw virtually no action as a redshirt freshman. McNutt's first college football appearance was during Iowa's 42–0 win over Florida International University in which he failed to accumulate any yards on one rushing attempt. He recorded 10 yards passing on one completion out of three attempts during the season. Of the two incomplete passes he threw, one was an interception. McNutt also ran one time for no yards. About halfway through his redshirt freshmen year he was switched to wide receiver. He ended up with only one catch for 11 yards. After the Spring practices leading up to the 2009 season, McNutt was listed as a first-team split end.

=== 2009 season ===
In his first college football start McNutt had five receptions, three of which were caught on the Iowa's first drive, for 48 yards. The first play from scrimmage resulted in a nine-yard pass completion from quarterback Ricky Stanzi. McNutt played in all thirteen games in 2009 and helped lead Iowa to an 11–2 record and an Orange Bowl win. Against Michigan State, with no time remaining, he caught Ricky Stanzi's 7-yard, game-winning touchdown pass. Mcnutt finished the season with 34 catches for 674 yards and a team leading 8 touchdown grabs.

=== 2010 season ===
McNutt led the Hawkeyes in both receptions (53) and yards (861), while hauling in 8 passes for touchdowns during the 2010–11 season. This marked the first year since 2006–07 in which Derrell Johnson-Koulianos did not lead the team in receiving yardage. McNutt finished the regular season by catching a touchdown in each of the final six games. With Johnson-Koulianos suspended for the Insight Bowl, McNutt caught two passes for 63 yards in the Hawkeyes' 27–24 victory over the Missouri Tigers.

=== 2011 season ===
McNutt caught six passes for 140 yards against Tennessee Tech, and caught eight passes for 112 yards against Pittsburgh. On October 22, 2011, against Indiana, McNutt scored a record breaking touchdown on an 80-yard play. He became Iowa's all-time leader in receiving touchdowns.

At the conclusion of the 2011 season, McNutt was named first-team All-Big Ten by both the coaches and media.

=== Statistics ===
| Year | Team | Games | | Receiving | | | | Rushing | | | |
| Year | Team | GP | GS | Rec | Yds | Avg | TD | Att | Yds | Avg | TD |
|---|---|---|---|---|---|---|---|---|---|---|---|
| 2007 | Iowa | 0 | 0 | (redshirt) Redshirted | | | | | | | |
| 2008 | Iowa | 3 | 0 | 1 | 11 | 11.0 | 0 | 1 | 0 | 0.0 | 0 |
| 2009 | Iowa | 13 | 5 | 34 | 674 | 19.8 | 8 | 0 | 0 | 0.0 | 0 |
| 2010 | Iowa | 13 | 13 | 53 | 861 | 16.2 | 8 | 1 | 5 | 5.0 | 0 |
| 2011 | Iowa | 13 | 13 | 82 | 1,315 | 16.0 | 12 | 6 | 58 | 9.7 | 0 |
| Career | | 42 | 31 | 170 | 2,861 | 17.0 | 28 | 8 | 63 | 7.9 | 0 |

== Professional career ==
=== Philadelphia Eagles ===
McNutt was selected by the Philadelphia Eagles in the sixth round (194th overall) of the 2012 NFL draft. He signed a four-year contract with the team on May 9, 2012. He was released during final cuts on August 31, 2012, and re-signed as a practice squad member days later. McNutt was released from the team on May 14, 2013.

=== Miami Dolphins ===
McNutt was claimed off waivers by the Miami Dolphins on May 15, 2013. He was released on August 31, 2013.

=== Carolina Panthers ===
McNutt signed with the Carolina Panthers on October 9, 2013. He was released on August 24, 2014.

=== Washington Redskins ===
McNutt was signed to the practice squad of the Washington Redskins on September 9, 2014. He was released on October 14, 2014.

== Coaching career ==
On October 11, 2016, McNutt was named the head coach of the Cedar Rapids Titans of the Indoor Football League (IFL). The next season he was promoted to general manager when the team hired 2016 IFL coach of the year Billy Back as the new head coach. He was not retained when the Titans were sold to a new ownership for the 2019 season.

He has since become the head coach of the Keokuk, Iowa High School football team

=== Head coaching record ===
| Team | Year | Regular season | | | | Postseason | | | |
| Team | Year | Won | Lost | Win % | Finish | Won | Lost | Win % | Result |
|---|---|---|---|---|---|---|---|---|---|
| CR | 2017 | 1 | 15 | .063 | 5th | 0 | 0 | – | |
