= 2011 Wisconsin Badgers football team =

American college football season

2011 Wisconsin Badgers football

Big Ten champion Big Ten Leaders Division co-champion

Big Ten Championship Game, W 42–39 vs. Michigan State

Rose Bowl, L 38–45 vs. Oregon
- Conference: Big Ten Conference
- Leaders Division

Ranking
- Coaches: No. 11
- AP: No. 10
- Record: 11–3 (6–2 Big Ten)
- Head coach: Bret Bielema (6th season)
- Offensive coordinator: Paul Chryst (7th season)
- Offensive scheme: Pro-style
- Defensive coordinator: Chris Ash (1st season)
- Co-defensive coordinator: Charlie Partridge (1st season)
- Base defense: 4–3
- MVPs: Montee Ball; Russell Wilson; Antonio Fenelus; Mike Taylor
- Captains: Patrick Butrym; Bradie Ewing; Aaron Henry; Russell Wilson
- Home stadium: Camp Randall Stadium

2011 Big Ten Conference football standings
	Conf.			Overall
Team	W		L	W		L
Legends Division
No. 11 Michigan State x	7	–	1	11	–	3
No. 12 Michigan %	6	–	2	11	–	2
No. 24 Nebraska	5	–	3	9	–	4
Iowa	4	–	4	7	–	6
Northwestern	3	–	5	6	–	7
Minnesota	2	–	6	3	–	9
Leaders Division
No. 10 Wisconsin xy$	6	–	2	11	–	3
Penn State x	6	–	2	9	–	4
Purdue	4	–	4	7	–	6
Ohio State	3	–	5	6	–	7
Illinois	2	–	6	7	–	6
Indiana	0	–	8	1	–	11
Championship: Wisconsin 42, Michigan State 39
$ – BCS representative as conference champion; % – BCS at-large representative; x – Division champion/co-champions; y – Championship game participant; Rankings from AP Poll

The 2011 Wisconsin Badgers football team was an American football team that represented the University of Wisconsin–Madison as a member of the Leaders Division of the Big Ten Conference during the 2011 NCAA Division I FBS football season. In their sixth season under head coach Bret Bielema, the Badgers compiled an 11–3 record (7–2 in conference games), won the Big Ten championship, and outscored opponents by a total of 618 to 266.

In games against ranked opponents, the Badgers defeated No. 8 Nebraska, lost to No. 15 Michigan State (regular season), and defeated No. 20 Penn State. They also lost to unranked Ohio State. They tied with Penn State for the Leaders Division championship and advanced to the inaugural Big Ten Championship Game having beaten Penn State during the regular season. In the Big Ten Championship Game, the Badgers defeated Legends Division champion Michigan State. They concluded the season in the Rose Bowl for the second consecutive year, losing to No. 6 Oregon,45–38. The Badgers were ranked No. 10 and No. 11, respectively in the final AP and Coaches polls.

The team's statistical leaders included quarterback Russell Wilson (3,175 passing yards, 33 touchdown passes, 191.78 passer rating), running back Montee Ball (1,923 rushing yards, 6.3 yards per carry, 236 points scored), and wide receivers Jared Abbrederis (55 receptions for 933 yards) and Nick Toon (64 receptions for 926 yards). Ball and guard Kevin Zeitler were consensus first-team picks on the 2011 All-America college football team, and center Peter Konz also received first-team All-America honors from multiple selectors.

The team played its home games at Camp Randall Stadium in Madison, Wisconsin.

== Schedule ==
Date	Time	Opponent	Rank	Site	TV	Result	Attendance	Source
September 1	7:00 p.m.	UNLV*	No. 11	Camp Randall Stadium; Madison, WI	ESPN	W 51–17	77,085	
September 10	11:00 a.m.	Oregon State*	No. 8	Camp Randall Stadium; Madison, WI	ESPN	W 35–0	80,337	
September 17	2:30 p.m.	vs. Northern Illinois*	No. 7	Soldier Field; Chicago, IL	ESPN3	W 49–7	41,068	
September 24	2:30 p.m.	No. 18 (FCS) South Dakota*	No. 6	Camp Randall Stadium; Madison, WI	BTN	W 59–10	78,880	
October 1	7:00 p.m.	No. 8 Nebraska	No. 7	Camp Randall Stadium; Madison, WI (rivalry, College GameDay)	ABC	W 48–17	81,384	
October 15	11:00 a.m.	Indiana^{†}	No. 4	Camp Randall Stadium; Madison, WI	ESPN2	W 59–7	80,732	
October 22	7:00 p.m.	at No. 15 Michigan State	No. 4	Spartan Stadium; East Lansing, MI (College GameDay)	ESPN	L 31–37	76,405	
October 29	7:00 p.m.	at Ohio State	No. 12	Ohio Stadium; Columbus, OH	ESPN	L 29–33	105,511	
November 5	2:30 p.m.	Purdue	No. 19	Camp Randall Stadium; Madison, WI	ABC/ESPN2	W 62–17	80,566	
November 12	2:30 p.m.	at Minnesota	No. 16	TCF Bank Stadium; Minneapolis, MN (rivalry)	BTN	W 42–13	49,158	
November 19	11:00 a.m.	at Illinois	No. 15	Memorial Stadium; Champaign, IL	ESPN2	W 28–17	45,519	
November 26	2:30 p.m.	No. 20 Penn State	No. 15	Camp Randall Stadium; Madison, WI	ESPN	W 45–7	79,708	
December 3	7:15 p.m.	vs. No. 11 Michigan State*	No. 15	Lucas Oil Stadium; Indianapolis, IN (Big Ten Championship Game)	FOX	W 42–39	64,152	
January 2, 2012	4:10 p.m.	vs. No. 5 Oregon*	No. 10	Rose Bowl; Pasadena, CA (Rose Bowl, College GameDay)	ESPN	L 38–45	91,245	
*Non-conference game; ^{†}Homecoming; Rankings from AP Poll released prior to the game; All times are in Central time

== Rankings ==
Ranking movements Legend: ██ Increase in ranking ██ Decrease in ranking
	Week															
Poll	Pre	1	2	3	4	5	6	7	8	9	10	11	12	13	14	Final
AP	11	8	7	6	7	4	4	4	12	19	16	15	15	15	9	10
Coaches	10	9	8	7	7	5	4	4	11	17	14	13	12	12	8	11
Harris	Not released						4	4	12	18	14	13	14	13	8	Not released
BCS	Not released							6	15	20	18	17	16	15	10	Not released

== Game summaries ==
=== UNLV ===
UNLV at Wisconsin

Team	1	2	3	4	Total
UNLV	0	3	7	7	17
• #10 Wisconsin	20	17	14	0	51

- Date: September 1
- Location: Camp Randall Stadium
  Madison, WI
- Game start: 7:00 p.m. CDT
- Elapsed time: 3:05
- Game attendance: 77,085
- Game weather: Clear, 90 °F (32 °C), Wind S 10 mph (16 km/h)
- Referee: Greg Burks
- TV announcers (ESPN): Rece Davis (Play-by-play), Jesse Palmer (Color) & Jenn Brown (Sideline)

Wisconsin kicked off the 2011 season with a bang, recording 499 yards of total offense en route to a 51–17 pounding of visiting UNLV. The Badgers, and in particular, QB Russell Wilson, received the opening kick and drove 65 yards in 3:11, taking a 7–0 lead on Wilson's first touchdown pass as a Wisconsin Badger to RB Montee Ball. The Badgers forced a three and out on UNLV's first possession, and WR Jared Abbrederis returned the UNLV punt 30 yards to put the Badgers in excellent field position. Wilson and the Badgers capitalized; as Montee Ball broke several tackles on a 20-yard touchdown run. With K Philip Welch sidelined to a leg injury, backup K Kyle French missed the PAT, leaving Wisconsin ahead only 13–0. But that wouldn't be all for Wisconsin in the first quarter: after UNLV missed a 34-yard field goal, Wisconsin drove 80 yards in 8 plays and extended their advantage to 20–0 on a 1-yard touchdown run by James White.

The Rebels were able to drive to Wisconsin's 35, but Nolan Kohorst missed his second field goal attempt of the game wide left from 52 yards. The Badgers wasted no time in capitalizing; Wilson dropped a short pass to Montee Ball, who proceeded to take it 63 yards to the UNLV three-yard line. Two plays later, Ball scored his third touchdown of the first half from a yard out, giving Wisconsin a 27–0 lead. But the pesky Rebels answered with a 13-play, 64-yard drive to the Wisconsin 20, scoring for the first time after Kohorst banked in a 37-yard attempt off the left upright.

Whatever hopes this may have raised on the UNLV sideline were quickly squashed as Wisconsin answered with a 3 play, 56-yard drive. Russell Wilson himself scored on a 46-yard touchdown run in which he accelerated past several defenders and scampered almost untouched into the endzone. UNLV managed to lose 8 yards and go three and out on their next drive, and after UNLV's punt gave Wisconsin excellent field position, the Badgers tacked on another field goal to take a 37–3 lead at the half.

The Badgers then scored on their first two possessions of the second half. An 8-yard pass to tight end Jacob Pedersen from Wilson and a 1-yard touchdown run by Ball (his 4th touchdown of the game). That would spell the end for the starting offense for the Badgers as they scored on all 8 possessions they had. UNLV would then score a touchdown with 2:53 left in the 3rd quarter and the scoring was closed out by UNLV with a touchdown pass with 11:41 remaining in the game.

Statistical leaders

- Rushing: Montee Ball – 10 Car, 63 Yds, 3 TDs
- Passing: Russell Wilson – 10/13, 255 Yds, 2 TDs
- Receiving: Montee Ball – 2 Rec, 67 Yds, 1 TD
- Defense: Louis Nzegwu – 4 Tkls, 2.0 TFL, 2 Sacks

=== Oregon State ===
Oregon State at Wisconsin

Team	1	2	3	4	Total
Oregon State	0	0	0	0	0
• #9 Wisconsin	7	14	7	7	35

- Date: September 10
- Location: Camp Randall Stadium
  Madison, WI
- Game start: 11:00 a.m. CDT
- Elapsed time: 3:06
- Game attendance: 80,337
- Game weather: Clear, 71 °F (22 °C), Wind N 3 mph (4.8 km/h)
- Referee: Jay Stricherz
- TV announcers (ESPN): Dave Pasch (Play-by-play), Chris Spielman (Color), Urban Meyer (Color) & Quint Kessenich (Sideline)

Scoring summary
1	8:35	WIS	Jacob Pedersen 17-yard pass from Russell Wilson (Kyle French kick)	WIS 7-0
2	7:42	WIS	Nick Toon 10-yard pass from Russell Wilson (Kyle French kick)	WIS 14-0
2	0:27	WIS	Jacob Pederson 6-yard pass from Russell Wilson (Kyle French kick)	WIS 21-0
3	12:09	WIS	Montee Ball 19-yard run (Kyle French kick)	WIS 28-0
4	14:55	WIS	Montee Ball 1-yard run (Kyle French kick)	WIS 35-0

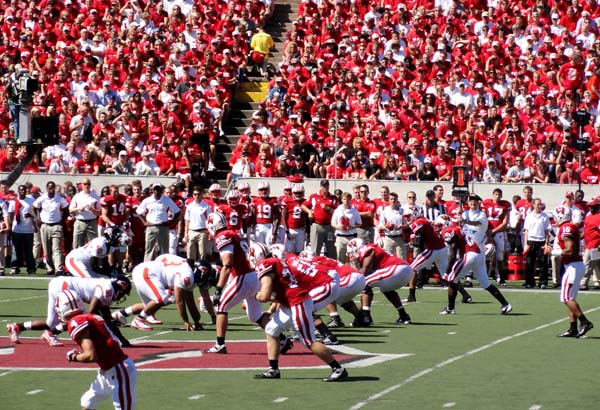
Wisconsin on offense in the first half.

The Badgers posted their first shutout since a 37–0 victory on October 31, 2009 against the Purdue Boilermakers. The Badgers out gained the Beavers 397 yards (208 rushing, 189 passing) to 284 yards (23 rushing, 261 passing). The scoring got started at the 8:35 mark in the first quarter with a 17-yard touchdown pass to tight end Jacob Pedersen from Wilson. The extra point was good by kicker Kyle French who is still filling in for the injured Philip Welch. With 7:42 in the 2nd quarter, Wilson connected with Nick Toon on a 10-yard TD pass. Then with 27 seconds left in the half, Wilson hit Pedersen again with a 6-yard TD pass. The Badgers led 21–0 at the half. Oregon State had done a nice job containing the Badgers powerful rushing attack but Wilson was able to pick apart the Beavers secondary. The Badgers got back on track with the running game in the second half and at the 12:09 mark in the 3rd quarter, Montee Ball scored on a 19-yard touchdown run. The scoring was closed out in the 4th quarter at 14:55 with a 1-yard TD run by Ball.

Statistical leaders

- Rushing: Montee Ball – 18 Car, 118 Yds, 2 TDs
- Passing: Russell Wilson – 17/21, 189 Yds, 3 TDs
- Receiving: Jacob Pedersen – 6 Rec, 80 Yds, 2 TDs
- Defense: Mike Taylor – 9 Tkls, 1.5 TFL, Sack, FF

=== Vs. Northern Illinois ===
Northern Illinois vs. Wisconsin

Team	1	2	3	4	Total
Northern Illinois	7	0	0	0	7
• #8 Wisconsin	14	14	14	7	49

- Date: September 17
- Location: Soldier Field
  Chicago, IL
- Game start: 2:30 p.m. CDT
- Elapsed time: 2:52
- Game attendance: 41,068
- Game weather: Mostly sunny, 65 °F (18 °C), Wind ESE 13 mph (21 km/h)
- Referee: Todd Geerlings
- TV announcers (ESPN3): Jim Barbar (Play-by-play) & Christian Fauria (Color)

It was an unwelcome "homecoming" for the Northern Illinois coach Dave Doeren, who spent the last five years in Madison as the Badgers' defensive coordinator. The Badgers rolled up 621 yards of offense (355 passing and 266 rushing) at Soldier Field. The scoring started early by the Badgers in the 1st quarter at the 12:55 mark with a 12-yard TD pass to Nick Toon from Russell Wilson. Northern Illinois did answer with a 3-yard TD run by Jasmin Hopkins with less than 2 minutes to go in the first quarter. Wisconsin did not waste anytime after the Huskies touchdown as they needed only 3 plays to go 49 yards and score on a 16-yard pass to Toon from Wilson. In the second quarter, Wisconsin scored twice. First was a Montee Ball 1-yard TD run and then a 20-yard TD run by James White. The Badgers lead the Huskies 28–7 at the half. The 3rd quarter was much of the same from the Badgers. Another 1-yard TD run by Ball and a 9-yard TD pass to Jacob Pedersen from Wilson. The only blemish for the Badgers was an interception by Russell Wilson in the 3rd quarter, the first turnover of the season for Wisconsin. The scoring was closed out in the 4th quarter with all the Badger backups in the game, backup quarterback Joe Brennan scored on a 6-yard TD run for his first touchdown of his young career. Russell Wilson passed for 347 yards which was the seventh best total in UW history. Wilson's 384 total yards in the game, was the fifth highest total offense in school annals. The defense was led by sophomore linebacker Chris Borland who totaled a game-high 11 tackles, including a pair of tackles-for-loss. Montee Ball has now scored in nine straight games, and has 22 touchdowns since last October 23.

Statistical leaders

- Rushing: Montee Ball – 20 Car, 91 Yds, 2 TDs
- Passing: Russell Wilson – 23/32, 347 Yds, 3 TDs
- Receiving: Nick Toon – 5 Rec, 75 Yds, 2 TDs
- Defense: Chris Borland – 11 Tkls, 2.0 TFL

=== South Dakota ===
South Dakota at Wisconsin

Team	1	2	3	4	Total
South Dakota	0	3	0	7	10
• #7 Wisconsin	10	21	14	14	59

- Date: September 24
- Location: Camp Randall Stadium
  Madison, WI
- Game start: 2:30 p.m. CDT
- Elapsed time: 3:04
- Game attendance: 78,880
- Game weather: Cloudy, 60 °F (16 °C), Wind NE 9 mph (14 km/h)
- Referee: Alex Kemp
- TV announcers (BTN): Tom Hart (Play-by-play), Derek Rackley (Color) & Jay Wilson (Sideline)

The Badgers dominated South Dakota from the FCS in their final "tune-up" game before the start of the Big Ten season. Wisconsin rolled up 612 yards on offense, 345 through the air and 267 on the ground, and only yielded 173 offensive yards to the Coyotes (124 rushing and 49 passing).

The Badgers started a bit slow on offense but got on the board first with a 5-yard touchdown run by Montee Ball. The Badgers got their first defensive turnover of the season with an interception by safety Shelton Johnson and then their second on the next Coyotes drive with another interception this time by linebacker Chris Borland. The Badgers managed only three points off the two turnovers, a 25-yard field goal by Kyle French. French also missed a 50-yard attempt. The Coyotes drove to a first and goal but were then forced to settle on a 24-yard field goal by Kevin Robb to cut the Wisconsin lead to 10–3 with 6:34 left in the second quarter. Then Wisconsin took over, scoring three touchdowns in the final six minutes of the half. First, it was James White on a 49-yard touchdown run. Then, Nick Toon caught a short pass from Russell Wilson and tip-toed down the sideline for a 59-yard touchdown. The Badgers got the ball back in the final two minutes of the half, and facing a third-and-goal on the 2, Wilson found Toon in the back of the end zone for a touchdown. Wisconsin went into the half leading 31–3.

The Badgers then scored twice in the third quarter to put the game out of reach for South Dakota. The first score of the third quarter was a 51-yard touchdown pass to Jared Abbrederis from Wilson. Then with 5:57 left in the third quarter, Montee Ball scored his second touchdown of the game on a 2-yard run. In the fourth quarter, most of the Badgers starters were done for the day. Wisconsin scored again at the beginning of the 4th quarter with a 4-yard touchdown run by a true freshman running back Melvin Gordon, his first career touchdown. After an interception was thrown by the Badgers backup QB Joe Brennen, South Dakota scored their first and only touchdown of the game, a 4-yard pass from the Coyotes backup QB. The scoring was closed out by Wisconsin on a 41-yard touchdown run by redshirt freshman running back Jeffrey Lewis, also his first career touchdown.

After the game, an unidentified Badgers player was involved in an incident at a local bar which he entered threatening to "whoop on everyone" for not giving him respect. He fled the bar after a physical altercation with a South Dakota fan.

Statistical leaders

- Rushing: Montee Ball – 15 Car, 88 Yds, 2 TDs
- Passing: Russell Wilson – 19/25, 345 Yds, 3 TDs
- Receiving: Nick Toon – 7 Rec, 155 Yds, 2 TDs
- Defense: Chris Borland – 8 Tkls, 2.0 TFL, INT

=== Nebraska ===
Nebraska at Wisconsin

Team	1	2	3	4	Total
#8 Nebraska	7	7	0	3	17
• #7 Wisconsin	7	20	14	7	48

- Date: October 1
- Location: Camp Randall Stadium
  Madison, WI
- Game start: 7:12 p.m. CDT
- Elapsed time: 3:22
- Game attendance: 81,384
- Game weather: Clear, 51 °F (11 °C), Wind N 5 mph (8.0 km/h)
- Referee: Bill LeMonnier
- TV announcers (ABC): Brent Musburger (Play-by-play), Kirk Herbstreit (Color) & Erin Andrews (Sideline)

Nebraska's Big Ten debut was very unwelcoming. #7 Wisconsin out gained #8 Nebraska, 486 yards (255 passing, 231 rushing) to 335 yards (176 passing, 159 rushing). The Badgers also held a commanding advantage in the time of possession battle, 35:15 to 24:45. Penalties and turnovers doomed Nebraska during this game. The Cornhuskers committed 9 penalties which cost them 80 yards. Taylor Martinez also threw 3 interceptions which the Badgers capitalized by scoring 21 points on all three of the turnovers. Between Russell Wilson's ability to pass and elude passing rushers, and Montee Ball running the ball, the Cornhuskers could not stop the potent Badgers attack. The Badgers also matched largest-ever margin of victory over a top-10 team (31 points).

Nebraska struck first on a 1-yard touchdown run by quarterback Taylor Martinez. The Badgers answered back with a 1-yard touchdown of their own by running back Montee Ball. In the second quarter, the Cornhuskers took the lead back with a 1-yard touchdown run by Rex Burkhead. Again, the Badgers drove right down on Nebraska's defense and scored on a Ball 3-yard touchdown run. Kicker Philip Welch playing is his first game of the season, had the extra point blocked by Jared Crick of Nebraska. The Huskers led 14–13 about halfway through the 2nd quarter. At that point the Badgers defense tightened up and forced two straight turnovers on back-to-back possessions. Taylor Martinez threw an INT to Badgers linebacker Mike Taylor. The Badgers took advantage and scored on a 36-yard touchdown pass from Wilson to Jared Abbrederis. On the very next drive for Nebraska, Martinez again threw and interception to The Badgers safety Aaron Henry. Again the Badgers turned the turnover into 7 points with a 46-yard touchdown pass to Nick Toon from Wilson. Nebraska's kicker Brett Maher then attempted a 50-yard field right before halftime but missed wide right. The Badgers led at the half 27–14.

Nebraska started with the ball to start the second half. The first offensive play of the half, Martinez again threw an interception to the Badgers cornerback Antonio Fenelus. Wisconsin cashed in again on the turnover with a 10-yard touchdown run by quarterback Russell Wilson. Any chance of a comeback for the Cornhuskers was all but gone. The Badgers scored again later in the 3rd quarter with a 4-yard touchdown by Ball. Nebraska would close out their scoring early in the 4th quarter on a 32-yard field goal by Brett Maher. The Badgers were not done as Montee Ball scored his 4th touchdown of the game on a 14-yard run. With 5 minutes left in the game, Nebraska tried to make the score a little more respectable as they drove all the way to the Badgers 1-yard line with the clock running out. With the game well out of reach, Nebraska coach Bo Pelini called a timeout with 12 seconds left to try to score. The Badgers defense stuffed quarterback Taylor Martinez keeping him out of the end zone and keeping the score a very dominating victory for the Badgers, 48–17. Following this victory the Badgers moved up to #4 on the AP Poll and #5 in the USA Today Coaches Poll, making them possible contenders for the BCS national championship game. The last time the Badgers were ranked this highly in the AP Poll was after their victories in the 1999 and 2000 Rose Bowls and have not been ranked higher since the season-ending #2 ranking in 1962 (the highest the Badgers have ever been ranked in the AP poll is #1 for just one week during the 1952 season).

Statistical leaders

- Rushing: Montee Ball – 30 Car, 151 Yds, 4 TDs
- Passing: Russell Wilson – 14/20, 255 Yds, 2 TDs
- Receiving: Jared Abbrederis – 5 Rec, 95 Yds, 1 TD
- Defense: Mike Taylor – 14 Tkls, TFL, INT

=== Indiana ===
Indiana at Wisconsin

Team	1	2	3	4	Total
Indiana	0	7	0	0	7
• #4 Wisconsin	14	24	14	7	59

- Date: October 15
- Location: Camp Randall Stadium
  Madison, WI
- Game start: 11:01 a.m. CDT
- Elapsed time: 3:09
- Game attendance: 80,732
- Game weather: Sunny/Windy, 52 °F (11 °C), Wind W 20 mph (32 km/h)
- Referee: Alex Kemp
- TV announcers (ESPN2): Beth Mowins (Play-by-play) & Mike Bellotti (Color)

Number four Wisconsin routs Indiana for the second straight season. Last year it was an 83–20 debacle and this year the Badgers roll 59–7. The Badgers outgained the Hoosiers 524 yards (332 rushing, 192 passing) to 287 (223 rushing, 64 passing). Indiana turned the ball over three times, two interceptions and a fumble, which hurt the Hoosiers chance of keeping the game close.

The game started with the Hoosiers forcing the Badgers to punt on their first series of the game. Indiana started strong on offense using a no-huddle and a full-house backfield look that kept the Badgers' defense off balance. The drive stalled near midfield for Indiana and the Badgers went to work. After a 46-yard catch-and-run by Montee Ball, Ball finished the drive with a 5-yard touchdown run, for a Wisconsin 7–0 lead. Things then got ugly for Indiana's special teams, as punter Adam Pines tried a rugby style punt and kicked the ball too low and right into the back of his own lineman. The ball bounced straight up in the air and was caught by Wisconsin's fullback Bradie Ewing. Indiana's punter was credited with a 1-yard put and the Badgers took over at Indiana's 26-yard line. Two plays later, running back James White faked out two Hoosiers defenders on his way to a 15-yard touchdown run and a 14–0 Wisconsin lead at the end of the first quarter. After a failed fourth-down conversion by the Hoosiers, the Badgers answered quickly. Running back Montee Ball took a pitch to the right and turned a threw a 25-yard touchdown pass to quarterback Russell Wilson (the first touchdown catch of his career) who was all alone on the leftside of the field. After an interception by cornerback Antonio Fenelus in the end zone, the Badgers drove down and scored on a 35-yard touchdown run by Ball. The Hoosiers finally got on the board, thanks to a 67-yard touchdown run by running back Stephen Houston. Wisconsin again had no problem marching down the field but stalled and was forced to kin a 38-yard field goal by Philip Welch. After an interception by safety Aaron Henry, the Badgers would score once more before halftime. After a 25-yard scramble by Wilson, Wilson then connected with tight end Jacob Pedersen on a 3-yard pass and the Badgers led 38–7 at the half.

The second half started with both teams defenses' forcing punts. Then with about 4:30 left in the third quarter, wide receiver Jared Abbrederis returned his first career punt 60 yards for a touchdown. After another Indiana punt, Montee ball went untouched on a 54-yard touchdown run. Wisconsin then pulled almost all of their starting offense and defensive players at the start of the fourth quarter. The scoring was closed out at the 9:17 mark of the 4th quarter when Indiana's quarterback, Edward Wright-Baker, fumbled in the end zone and was recovered for a touchdown by backup linebacker Derek Landish. This was Wisconsin's 13th-straight regular-season win.

Statistical leaders

- Rushing: Montee Ball – 14 Car, 142 Yds, 3 TDs
- Passing: Russell Wilson – 12/17, 166 Yds, 1 TD
- Receiving: Jared Abbrederis – 4 Rec, 63 Yds
- Defense: Chris Borland – 15 Tkls, 0.5 Sack

=== At Michigan State ===
Wisconsin at Michigan State

Team	1	2	3	4	Total
#4 Wisconsin	14	0	3	14	31
• #13 Michigan State	0	23	0	14	37

- Date: October 22
- Location: Spartan Stadium
  East Lansing, MI
- Game start: 7:06 p.m. CDT
- Elapsed time: 3:23
- Game attendance: 76,405
- Game weather: Partly cloudy, 50 °F (10 °C), Wind: calm
- Referee: Dennis Lipski
- TV announcers (ESPN): Brent Musburger (Play-by-play), Kirk Herbstreit (Color) & Erin Andrews (Sideline)

Michigan State handed Wisconsin their first loss of the season despite being out gained by the Badgers 443 (223 passing, 220 rushing) to 399 (290 passing, 109 rushing). The key stat for the game was Michigan State did not commit a penalty. The Spartans also controlled the time of possession which is the first time this season that the Badgers have not won the TOP battle.

The Badgers started off strong in the first quarter striking first on their opening drive of the game with a 9-yard touchdown pass to tight end Jacob Pedersen from Russell Wilson. After a Spartans fumble, the Badgers scored again on a 9-yard touchdown run by running back Montee Ball. The second quarter was all Michigan State. After a Spartans punt pinned the Badgers at their own 5-yard line, quarterback Russell Wilson was forced to throw the ball away in his own end zone. Wilson was called for intentional grounding and a safety that made the score 14–2. After the free kick, the Spartans scored on a 34-yard reverse to wide receiver Keshawn Martin. The Badgers responded with an impressive drive but stalled and ended up settling for a 30-yard field goal attempt. The Spartans blocked the kick and responded with an 80-yard drive capitalized with a 35-yard touchdown pass to wide receiver B.J. Cunningham from quarterback Kirk Cousins on fourth-and-2. That gave Michigan State a 16–14 lead with 1:20 left in the half. The Spartans weren't done. They used timeouts to stop the clock and force the Badgers to punt. The Spartans blocked the punt and recovered it in the end zone for a touchdown. Michigan State went into the half leading 23–14.

The only scoring in the third quarter was a 33-yard field goal Badgers kicker Philip Welch. Then in the fourth quarter, Michigan State pulled farther ahead with a 15-yard touchdown pass to Keshawn Martin from Cousins. The Spartans converted the 2-point conversion with a pass to Cunningham from Cousins. With the game almost out of reach, the Badgers came down and scored on a Russell Wilson 22-yard touchdown run. The Badgers got the ball back and scored on a 2-yard touchdown pass to Ball from Wilson that tied the game at 31–31 with 1:26 left. The Spartans got the ball back and on first down, Cousins was flushed from the pocket and lost a handle of the ball but it was recovered by the Spartans. Wisconsin called a timeout with 42 seconds left and second-and 20 from the Spartans own 24-yard line. After a 12-yard completion from Cousins to Cunningham, both coaches were waiting to see who or if anyone was going to call a time out. The Badgers coach Bret Bielema called a timeout again thinking they would get the ball back if they can stop the Spartans on third down. The Spartans picked up the first down on an 11-yard shovel pass for Martin. Michigan State's last drive appeared to stall at the Wisconsin 44, but the Spartans had time for one more play. Cousins was able to buy enough time for his receivers to get down field for a final Hail Mary pass. The ball bounced off Cunningham's helmet and into Keith Nichol's hands at the 1-yard line. Badgers linebacker Mike Taylor was fighting to keep Nichol from getting into the endzone but Nichol made one final lunge to try to get the ball across the goal line. The officials ruled that the ball was short and marked at the half-yard line. After review, it was determined that Nichol had crossed the goal line and it was a touchdown. This was the second year in a row that Michigan State handed Wisconsin their first loss of the season.

Statistical leaders

- Rushing: Montee Ball – 18 Car, 115 Yds, 1 TD
- Passing: Russell Wilson – 14/21, 223 Yds, 2 TDs, 2 INTs
- Receiving: Jared Abbrederis – 6 Rec, 91 Yds
- Defense: Chris Borland – 13 Tkls, Sack, 1.5 TFL

=== At Ohio State ===
Wisconsin at Ohio State

Team	1	2	3	4	Total
#11 Wisconsin	7	0	7	15	29
• Ohio State	0	3	14	16	33

- Date: October 29
- Location: Ohio Stadium
  Columbus, OH
- Game start: 7:07 p.m. CDT
- Elapsed time: 3:17
- Game attendance: 105,511
- Game weather: Clear, 43 °F (6 °C), Wind S 1 mph (1.6 km/h)
- Referee: Dave Witvoet
- TV announcers (ESPN): Brad Nessler (Play-by-play), Todd Blackledge (Color) & Holly Rowe (Sideline)

For the second week in a row, the Badgers lost on a long pass in the final 30 seconds of the game. For the first time this season, the Badgers were out gained. Wisconsin gained 342 total yards on offense (253 passing, 89 rushing) while Ohio State gained a total of 357 yards (89 passing, 268 rushing). For the second week in a row the Badgers lost the time of possession battle, 24:12 to 35:48.

The first half was all defense on both sides. The Badgers struck first in the first quarter with a 22-yard touchdown pass to running back Montee Ball from Russell Wilson. In the second quarter, Ohio State kicker Drew Basil, kicked a 39-yard field goal the hit off the right upright and went in. The Badgers led 7–3 at the half.

In the second half, both teams offense's turned it up. Ohio State started the second half with the ball and scored on a 1-yard touchdown run by quarterback Braxton Miller. The Buckeyes scored again on a 2-yard touchdown run by running back Jordan Hall. The Badgers answered with a 1-yard touchdown run by Montee Ball to make it a 17–14 Ohio State led at the end of the third quarter. The fourth quarter started with a 22-yard field goal by Ohio State's Drew Basil. Then with a 4:30 left in the game, Ohio State quarterback Braxton Miller scored on a 44-yard touchdown run which seemed to close the door on the Badgers. Wisconsin never let down as they scored two quick touchdowns. The first was a 17-yard touchdown pass from Russell Wilson to wide receiver Jared Abbrederis and then a 49-yard touchdown pass to Abbrederis from Wilson. The Badgers took a 29–26 lead with 1:18 to go in the game. The Buckeyes drove down to the Badgers 40-yard line and with about 30 seconds to go. It looked like they were trying to get into field goal range to try to tie the game. The next play Ohio State quarterback scrambled around and it looked like he was going to run but at the last second just before he crossed the line of scrimmage, Miller threw a 40-yard touchdown pass to wide receiver Devin Smith in the back of the end zone. The Badgers only had 20 seconds left as they got the Ohio State's 45-yard line and took three shots at the end zone but failed.

Statistical leaders

- Rushing: Montee Ball – 17 Car, 85 Yds, 1 TD
- Passing: Russell Wilson – 20/32, 253 Yds, 3 TDs
- Receiving: Jared Abbrederis – 6 Rec, 113 Yds, 2 TDs
- Defense: Mike Taylor – 22 Tkls, 2.5 TFL, PBU

=== Purdue ===
Purdue at Wisconsin

Team	1	2	3	4	Total
Purdue	10	7	0	0	17
• #17 Wisconsin	14	24	14	10	62

- Date: November 5
- Location: Camp Randall Stadium
  Madison, WI
- Game start: 2:36 p.m. CDT
- Elapsed time: 3:21
- Game attendance: 80,566
- Game weather: Partly cloudy, 55 °F (13 °C), Wind S 17 mph (27 km/h)
- Referee: Scott McElwee
- TV announcers (ABC/ESPN2): Mike Patrick (Play-by-play) & Craig James (Color)

Scoring summary
1	12:47	WIS	Jacob Pedersen 2-yard pass from Russell Wilson (Philip Welch kick)	WIS 7-0
1	12:24	PUR	Crosby Wright 30-yard pass from Caleb TerBush (Carson Wiggs kick)	Tied 7-7
1	3:24	WIS	Jared Abbrederis 5-yard pass from Russell Wilson (Philip Welch kick)	WIS 14-7
1	1:13	PUR	Carson Wiggs 25-yard field goal	WIS 14-10
2	12:14	WIS	Montee Ball 1-yard run (Philip Welch kick)	WIS 21-10
2	6:16	WIS	Russell Wilson 6-yard run (Philip Welch kick)	WIS 28-10
2	2:59	WIS	Montee Ball 2-yard run (Philip Welch kick)	WIS 35-10
2	0:24	PUR	Justin Siller 2-yard run (Carson Wiggs kick)	WIS 35-17
2	0:00	WIS	Philip Welch 52-yard field goal	WIS 38-17
3	12:01	WIS	Montee Ball 29-yard run (Philip Welch kick)	WIS 45-17
3	11:01	WIS	James White 5-yard run (Philip Welch kick)	WIS 52-17
4	12:59	WIS	James White 1-yard run (Philip Welch kick)	WIS 59-17
4	5:02	WIS	Kyle French 29-yard field goal	WIS 62-17

The Badgers got back on track at home after two heartbreaking losses on the road. Wisconsin dominated the line of scrimmage and the powerful Badger offensive line imposed their will on the Purdue defense. Wisconsin racked up 605 total yards on offense (364 rushing, 241 passing) compared to Purdue's 284 total offensive yards (120 rushing, 164 passing). The Badgers also got back to what they do best, which is controlling the time of possession battle. The Badgers controlled the clock for 36:43 compared to Boilermakers 23:17. Purdue also threw two interceptions which turned into 14 Badger points.

Wisconsin started the game with the ball and the first play from scrimmage, running back Montee Ball took the ball right up the middle for a 44-yard gain. A few plays later, quarterback Russell Wilson connected with tight end Jacob Pedersen on a 1-yard touchdown pass. The Boilermakers came right back after a 49-yard kickoff return. Purdue quarterback Caleb TerBush hit tight end Crosby Wright for a 30-yard touchdown pass, which tied the game at seven. Wisconsin took a 14–7 lead in the first quarter, as Wilson's 66-yard strike to wide-open receiver Jeff Duckworth which helped set up Wilson's 5-yard touchdown pass to wide receiver Jared Abbrederis. Special teams problems struck again, as Wisconsin allowed a 74-yard kickoff return. The Badgers held the Boilermakers to a 25-yard field goal by kicker Carson Wiggs, cutting Wisconsin's lead to 14–10 with 1:13 left in the first quarter. Montee Ball got on the scoreboard early in the second quarter with an easy 1-yard touchdown run. After an interception by Badger linebacker Mike Taylor, Russell Wilson scored on a 6-yard touchdown run. The Badgers got the ball back a few minutes later and Montee Ball found the end zone again on a 3-yard touchdown run. Purdue then put a long drive together before halftime and wide receiver Justin Siller scored on a 2-yard touchdown run. But Wisconsin had just enough time for a drive that set up a 52-yard field goal by kicker Philip Welch and took a 38–17 lead into the half.

The third quarter started with Purdue getting the ball and quickly punting it back to Wisconsin. Montee Ball the scored on a 29-yard touchdown run which was his 24th total touchdown of the season tying former Badger Brian Calhoun for most total touchdowns in a single season in Badgers history. After an interception by Badger linebacker Chris Borland deep in Purdue territory, running back James White scored on a 5-yard run right up the middle. Most of the Badgers starters were done for the day by the time the fourth quarter started. James White scored again for the Badgers on a 1-yard touchdown run, the Badgers 6th rushing touchdown of the game. The scoring was closed out at the 5:02 mark of the fourth quarter when Badger backup kicker, Kyle French, kicked a 29-yard field goal. Montee Ball, who leads the nation in total touchdowns with 24, had a career-high 223 rushing yards while only playing 2 and a half quarters.

Statistical leaders

- Rushing: Montee Ball – 20 Car, 223 Yds, 3 TDs
- Passing: Russell Wilson – 15/20, 205 Yds, 2 TDs
- Receiving: Jacob Pedersen – 2 Rec, 28 Yds, 1 TD
- Defense: Chris Borland – 11 Tkls, 3.5 TFL, 2 FF, INT

=== At Minnesota ===
Wisconsin at Minnesota

Team	1	2	3	4	Total
• #14 Wisconsin	14	14	7	7	42
Minnesota	0	6	7	0	13

- Date: November 12
- Location: TCF Bank Stadium
  Minneapolis, MN
- Game start: 2:42 p.m. CST
- Elapsed time: 2:46
- Game attendance: 49,158
- Game weather: Mostly cloudy, 61 °F (16 °C), Wind S 14 mph (23 km/h)
- Referee: Dan Capron
- TV announcers (BTN): Eric Collins (Play-by-play), Chris Martin (Color) & Dionne Miller (Sideline)

Scoring summary
1	6:52	WIS	Montee Ball 5-yard pass from Russell Wilson (Philip Welch kick)	WIS 7-0
1	4:27	WIS	Montee Ball 14-yard run (Philip Welch kick)	WIS 14-0
2	14:54	WIS	Nick Toon 9-yard pass from Russell Wilson (Philip Welch kick)	WIS 21-0
2	7:41	MINN	Jordan Wettstein 5-yard run (kick failed)	WIS 21-6
2	0:51	WIS	Nick Toon 17-yard pass from Russell Wilson (Philip Welch kick)	WIS 28-6
3	14:46	MINN	Duane Bennett 96-yard kickoff return (Jordan Wettstein kick)	WIS 28-13
3	8:58	WIS	Jacob Pedersen 3-yard pass from Russell Wilson (Philip Welch kick)	WIS 35-13
4	9:07	WIS	Montee Ball 3-yard run (Philip Welch kick)	WIS 42-13

Wisconsin retained Paul Bunyan's Axe for the eighth straight year with a dominating performance on the road against Minnesota. The Badgers, offensively outgained the Golden Gophers 461 yards (283 rushing, 178 passing) to 156 yards (105 rushing, 51 passing) for Minnesota. Again, Wisconsin controlled the time of possession battle by controlling the ball for almost ten minutes more than Minnesota. The Badgers also moved the chains 20 more times than the Golden Gophers.

The Badgers started the game with the ball and chewed up more than half of the first quarter on the opening drive of the game. The drive was capped off by a 5-yard touchdown pass to running back Montee Ball from quarterback Russell Wilson. After the Badger defense forced the Golden Gophers to punt on their opening drive, Montee Ball scored a few plays later on a 14-yard touchdown run. The yardage at the end of the first quarter was 189 for Wisconsin and minus-1 for Minnesota. The Badgers scored within the first minute of the second quarter on a 9-yard touchdown pass to wide receiver Nick Toon from Wilson. Then Golden Gophers put their best drive of the game together as they drove down inside the Badgers 10-yard line but stalled and were about to attempt a chip-shot field goal. Then, Minnesota's holder pitched the ball to their kicker, Jordan Wettstein who broke a tackle and scored a touchdown on a 5-yard run. Wettstein then missed the extra point to make the score 21–6. The Badgers scored with less than a minute before halftime on a 17-yard touchdown pass to Nick Toon from Russell Wilson putting the Badgers up 28–6 at the half.

The Golden Gophers opened the second half with a 96-yard kickoff return for a touchdown by Duane Bennett. The Badgers answered back with a long sustaining drive and scored on a 3-yard touchdown pass to tight end Jacob Pedersen from Russell Wilson, his fourth touchdown pass of the game. The scoring was capped off in the fourth quarter by a 1-yard touchdown run by Montee Ball. That touchdown by Montee Ball was his 27th for the season and broke the Big Ten record for most touchdowns in a single season breaking the mark previously held by Ohio State's Pete Johnson (1975), Indiana's Anthony Thompson (1988) and Penn State's Ki-Jana Carter (1994). Russell Wilson is now the Badgers single season record holder for most touchdown passes (25) passing John Stocco.

Statistical leaders

- Rushing: Montee Ball – 23 Car, 166 Yds, 2 TDs
- Passing: Russell Wilson – 16/17, 178 Yds, 4 TDs
- Receiving: Nick Toon – 8 Rec, 100 Yds, 2 TDs
- Defense: Mike Taylor – 13 Tkls

=== At Illinois ===
Wisconsin at Illinois

Team	1	2	3	4	Total
• #13 Wisconsin	0	7	14	7	28
Illinois	0	17	0	0	17

- Date: November 19
- Location: Memorial Stadium
  Champaign, IL
- Game start: 11:01 a.m. CST
- Elapsed time: 2:55
- Game attendance: 45,519
- Game weather: Cloudy and very windy, 51 °F (11 °C), Wind S 28 mph (45 km/h)
- Referee: Todd Gerrlings
- TV announcers (ESPN2): Beth Mowins (Play-by-play) & Mike Bellotti (Color)

The Badgers pulled out a hard fought victory against the Illini in Champaign. It was a tale of two halves as the Illini owned the first half and the Badgers took over in the second half. Illinois offensively outgained the Badgers 301 yards (149 rushing, 151 passing) for the Illini to 285 yard (195 rushing, 90 passing) for the Badgers. It was only the second time this season that the Badgers had been out gained (Ohio State). Four turnovers and special teams miscues cost Illinois in this game. The Illini rotated two quarterback throughout the game, Nathan Scheelhaase and freshman Reilly O'Toole. O'Toole threw two interceptions in the second half and Scheelhaase threw one late in the fourth quarter which just about sealed the win for the Badgers.

After both team went scoreless in the first quarter, with less than two minutes into the second quarter, the Illini struck first on a 12-yard touchdown run by running back Donovoon Young. About five minutes later, Illinois scored again on a 1-yard touchdown run by Young. The Illini led 14–0 about halfway through the second quarter. After a botched punt attempt where the Illini punter dropped the snap and was tackled at the 2-yard line, Wisconsin got on the board with a 1-yard touchdown run by running back Montee Ball. With less than three minutes until halftime, Illinois drove down and settled for a 41-yard field goal by kicker Derek Dimke. The unranked Illini who had lost four straight after winning their first six games of the season, led the Badgers 17–7 at the half.

The Illini got the ball to start the second half and had a chance to put the game almost out of reach but Badger linebacker Chris Borland hit Illini wide receiver Darius Millines forcing a fumble that was recovered by Badger linebacker Mike Taylor. The Badgers then put together a long drive converting on a couple of fourth downs. The drive was capped on a 5-yard touchdown pass to Ball from quarterback Russell Wilson. The Badgers next score came after another special teams mistake as Illini punt returner, Terry Hawthorne, let a put sail over his head and bounced about 30-yards and was downed at the 3-yard line for a 74-yard punt by Badgers punter Brad Nortman. His longest punt of the season. After an Illini three-and-out, the Badgers took over at Illinois 44-yard line. Two plays later, Wilson scored on 1-yard touchdown run on a naked bootleg which closed out the third quarter. The Badgers had their first led of the day, 21–17. The Illini opened the fourth quarter with O'Toole throwing an interception to the Badgers safety Aaron Henry. This then led to a brilliant 17-yard touchdown run by the Badgers Montee Ball, his third touchdown of the game. After the Illini drove to the Badgers 29-yard line, Illini quarterback Scheelhaase threw an interception to Badgers safety Shelton Johnson with 7:30 left in the game. The Badgers used Ball and a couple key completions by Wilson to run out the clock. The Badgers scored 21 unanswered points in the second half to pull away with the victory.

Montee Ball became only the fifth FBS player to score 30 touchdowns in a single season. Ball also rushed for a career-high 224 yards, one more yard than his previous high which he had two games earlier against Purdue.

Statistical leaders

- Rushing: Montee Ball – 38 Car, 244 Yds, 2 TDs
- Passing: Russell Wilson – 10/13, 90 Yds, 1 TD
- Receiving: Nick Toon – 6 Rec, 67 Yds
- Defense: Chris Borland – 16 Tkls, 1.5 TFL, 2 FF, PBU

=== Penn State ===
Penn State at Wisconsin

Team	1	2	3	4	Total
#19 Penn State	7	0	0	0	7
• #12 Wisconsin	7	21	14	3	45

- Date: November 26
- Location: Camp Randall Stadium
  Madison, WI
- Game start: 2:36 p.m. CST
- Elapsed time: 3:09
- Game attendance: 79,708
- Game weather: Light rain, 52 °F (11 °C), Wind SW 5 mph (8.0 km/h)
- Referee: John O'Neill
- TV announcers (ESPN): Sean McDonough (Play-by-play), Matt Millen (Color) & Tom Rinaldi (Sideline)

Scoring summary
1	8:44	PSU	Curtis Drake 44-yard pass from Matt McGloin (Anthony Fera kick)	PSU 7-0
1	3:32	WIS	Jared Abbrederis 21-yard pass from Russell Wilson (Philip Welch kick)	Tied 7-7
2	14:57	WIS	Montee Ball 1-yard run (Philip Welch kick)	WIS 14-7
2	2:09	WIS	Montee Ball 2-yard run (Philip Welch kick)	WIS 21-7
2	0:37	WIS	Nick Toon 4-yard pass from Russell Wilson (Philip Welch kick)	WIS 28-7
3	12:52	WIS	Montee Ball 9-yard run (Philip Welch kick)	WIS 35-7
3	4:09	WIS	Montee Ball 18-yard run (Philip Welch kick)	WIS 42-7
4	10:47	WIS	Philip Welch 44-yard field goal	WIS 45-7

This game determined who would represent the Leaders Division in the first ever Big Ten Championship Game. The Badgers dominated the Nittany Lions in all phases of the game. Wisconsin almost doubled the total offensive yards of Penn State. The Badgers totaled 450 yards on offense (264 rushing, 186 passing) to the Nittany Lions 233 yards (114 rushing, 119 passing). The Badgers also forced four turnovers and held a 38:17 to 21:43 in the time of possession battle.

Wisconsin started with the ball and moved into Penn State territory but stalled and was forced to punt. After the Badgers forced a punt on Penn State's first possession, the Badgers were flagged for running into the kicker which gave new life to the Nittany Lions' drive. Four plays later, Penn State quarterback Matt McGloin, connected on a 44-yard touchdown pass to a wide open receiver, Curtis Drake. Penn State struck first but Wisconsin answered back with a 10-play, 76-yard drive that was capped with a 21-yard touchdown pass from Russell Wilson to Jared Abbrederis. On the next Penn State drive, McGloin threw an interception to Wisconsin safety Shelton Johnson near midfield. The Badgers then scored a few plays later on a Montee Ball 1-yard touchdown run. The Wisconsin defense would continue to dominate and force Penn State to punt. The Badgers scored again on a Montee Ball 2-yard touchdown run. Penn State would fumble the kickoff and the Wisconsin capitalized on a 4-yard touchdown pass from Wilson to Nick Toon, who was wearing number 87 not his usual number 1 in tribute to his father Al Toon on senior day. The Badgers led 28–7 at halftime.

Penn State running back Silas Redd fumbled early in the third quarter and Wisconsin recovered again near midfield. The Badgers marched down on the Nittany Lions defense and Montee Ball scored again, this time on a 9-yard touchdown run. Later in the third quarter, Montee Ball tied his career high with his fourth touchdown of the game, on an 18-yard run. The scoring was closed out by the Badgers kicker Philip Welch, when he kicked a 44-yard field goal with 10:47 left in the game.

With the win, Wisconsin will face the Legends Division champion Michigan State in the Big Ten Championship Game. Montee Ball scored four touchdowns which moves him into second place on the all-time FBS single-season touchdown list with 34. He now only trails Oklahoma State's Barry Sanders record of 39 set in 1988.

Statistical leaders

- Rushing: Montee Ball – 25 Car, 156 Yds, 4 TDs
- Passing: Russell Wilson – 19/29, 186 Yds, 2 TDs
- Receiving: Jared Abbrederis – 7 Rec, 93 Yds, TD
- Defense: Conor O'Neill – 6 Tkls, FF, FR

=== Vs. Michigan State (Big Ten Championship) ===
Wisconsin vs. Michigan State

Team	1	2	3	4	Total
• #12 Wisconsin	21	0	7	14	42
#9 Michigan State	7	22	7	3	39

- Date: December 3
- Location: Lucas Oil Stadium
  Indianapolis, IN
- Game start: 7:19 p.m. CST
- Elapsed time: 3:33
- Game attendance: 64,152
- Game weather: Indoors
- Referee: Bill LeMonnier
- TV announcers (FOX): Gus Johnson (Play-by-play), Charles Davis (Color), Tim Brewster (Sideline) & Dhani Jones (Sideline)

Scoring summary
1	10:04	WIS	Jeff Duckworth 3-yard pass from Russell Wilson (Philip Welch kick)	WIS 7-0
1	6:44	MSU	Edwin Baker 8-yard run (Dan Conroy kick)	Tied 7-7
1	3:44	WIS	Montee Ball 6-yard run (Philip Welch kick)	WIS 14-7
1	3:12	WIS	Montee Ball 6-yard run (Philip Welch kick)	WIS 21-7
2	14:55	MSU	B.J. Cunningham 30-yard pass from Kirk Cousins (Dan Conroy kick)	WIS 21-14
2	10:21	MSU	B.J. Cunningham 7-yard pass from Kirk Cousins (Brad Sonntag run)	MSU 22-21
2	3:26	MSU	Le'Veon Bell 6-yard run (Dan Conroy kick)	MSU 29-21
3	9:13	WIS	Jared Abbrederis 42-yard pass from Russell Wilson (Philip Welch kick)	MSU 29-28
3	1:41	MSU	B.J. Cunningham 44-yard pass from Kirk Cousins (Dan Conroy kick)	MSU 36-28
4	13:25	WIS	Montee Ball 5-yard pass from Russell Wilson (pass failed)	MSU 36-34
4	8:28	MSU	Dan Conroy 25-yard field goal	MSU 39-34
4	3:45	WIS	Montee Ball 7-yard pass from Russell Wilson (Russell Wilson to Jacob Pedersen pass)	WIS 42-39

Wisconsin and Michigan State met in the inaugural Big Ten Championship game, with the winner getting an invitation to the Rose Bowl. A high scoring game that was back and forth for most of the game. The Spartans out gained the Badgers 471 yards (190 rushing, 281 passing) to 345 yards (126 rushing, 219 passing). Wisconsin only held a ten-second advantage in the time of possession battle but what hurt Michigan State was two turnovers to Wisconsin's zero and seven penalties that cost the Spartans 50 yards.

The game started off with both teams scoring on their opening drives. Wisconsin scored first on a 3-yard touchdown pass to wide receiver Jeff Duckworth from Russell Wilson. Michigan State answered right back on an 8-yard touchdown run by running back Edwin Baker. The Badgers then answered the Spartans scoring drive with a scoring drive of their own which was capped with a 6-yard touchdown run by Montee Ball. After Michigan State fumbled the kickoff, Wisconsin scored about 30 seconds later on another Montee Ball 6-yard touchdown run. Wisconsin led 21–7 at the end of the first quarter. The second quarter was dominated by Michigan State as they scored 22 unanswered points. Five seconds into the second quarter, the Spartans scored on a 30-yard touchdown pass to wide receiver B.J. Cunningham from Kirk Cousins. Less than five minutes later, Michigan State struck again. This time wide receiver Keith Nichol caught a short pass at the Wisconsin 4-yard line and as he was being tackled out of bounds, Nichol pitched the ball to fellow wide receiver Cunningham, who ran in for the final four yards and the score. Cunningham got the credit for a 7-yard touchdown catch from Cousins on that play. On the extra point, the Spartans ran a fake as the holder, Brad Sontag, scored and converted the two-point conversion giving the Spartans their first led of the game 22–21. Michigan State wasn't done at the scored again with under three and a half minutes left in the half, as running back Le'Veon Bell scored on a 6-yard touchdown run. At halftime, Michigan State led 29–21.

The second half scoring started with the Badgers scoring on a 42-yard touchdown pass to wide receiver Jared Abbrederis from Wilson. That cut the Spartan led to one but Michigan State would answer once again. It was Cunningham again scoring his third touchdown of the game on a 44-yard catch and run. The fourth quarter started and the Badger offense kept them in the game putting together a 7-play, 52-yard scoring drive that was capped with a 5-yard shovel pass to Ball from Wilson. The 2-point conversion pass attempt failed so the Badgers still trailed by two, 36–34. The Spartans next possession ate up almost five minutes on a 10-play drive but the Badger defense finally made a stand and forced a 25-yard field goal by Michigan State kicker Dan Conroy. With about 8:30 left in the game the Badgers trailed by five, 39–34. The Badgers offense never missed a beat as they put together their own clock eating drive. The Badgers had an 8-play, 64-yard scoring drive that took 4:38 off the clock. Maybe the biggest play of the game was on that drive the Badgers had a fourth-and-six at the Spartans 43-yard line. Wilson dropped back to pass and was almost sacked but he got away from the rush and threw the ball high up for grabs and Badger receiver Jeff Duckworth, came down with the ball for a 36-yard catch and a first-and-goal at the Spartans 7-yard line. The next play, Ball scored on a 7-yard touchdown run, his fourth touchdown of the game. Wisconsin converted the two-point attempt with a pass from Wilson to tight end Jacob Pedersen. The Badgers now led 42–39 with 3:45 left in the game. Michigan State got the ball but was forced to punt after a three-and-out. The Badgers took over at their own 19-yard line with 2:51 left in the game. After three Badger carries for 7-yards, the Spartans using their last two timeouts, Michigan State forced a Wisconsin punt on fourth-and-three. Wisconsin punted it away and Michigan State returner, Keshawn Martin returned the punt all the Badger 3-yard line. As the Spartans were celebrating, there was a flag during the punt. The penalty was for running into the kicker which gave the Badgers a first down and three kneel downs would end the game, Wisconsin 42 – Michigan State 39.

The win sent the Badgers to the Rose Bowl for the second year in a row. There they will face the Oregon Ducks. Montee Ball's four touchdowns in the game runs his season total to 38, one shy of tying the single season record of 39 held by Barry Sanders. Russell Wilson threw three touchdown passes in the game and broke the NCAA record by throwing a touchdown pass in his 37th consecutive game. Graham Harrell of Texas Tech held the previous mark (36). Wilson was given the Grange-Griffin MVP award for the game. The loss not only extended Michigan State's Rose Bowl drought, it hasn't gone since 1988, and ruined Mark Dantonio's pregame prediction. In an interview taped the Friday before the game, Dantonio told a local radio station that the Spartans would win the game and go to the Rose Bowl.

Statistical leaders

- Rushing: Montee Ball – 27 Car, 137 Yds, 3 TDs
- Passing: Russell Wilson – 17/24, 187 Yds, 3 TDs
- Receiving: Jared Abbrederis – 3 Rec, 65 Yds, TD
- Defense: Chris Borland – 7 Tkls, 1.5 TFL, PBU

=== Vs. Oregon (Rose Bowl) ===
Wisconsin vs. Oregon

Team	1	2	3	4	Total
#8 Wisconsin	14	14	10	0	38
• #5 Oregon	14	14	7	10	45

- Date: January 2
- Location: Rose Bowl Stadium
  Pasadena, CA
- Game start: 4:12 p.m. CST
- Elapsed time: 3:26
- Game attendance: 91,245
- Game weather: Sunny, 82 °F (28 °C), Wind SW 2 mph (3.2 km/h)
- Referee: Brad Allen
- TV announcers (ESPN): Brent Musburger (Play-by-play), Kirk Herbstreit (Color) & Erin Andrews (Sideline)

Statistical leaders

- Rushing: Montee Ball – 32 Car, 164 Yds, 1 TD
- Passing: Russell Wilson – 19/25, 296 Yds, 2 TDs, INT
- Receiving: Nick Toon – 9 Rec, 104 Yds, TD
- Defense: Mike Taylor – 13 Tkls, Sack, TFL, FF

== Personnel ==
=== Coaching staff ===
Name	Position
Bret Bielema	Head coach
Paul Chryst	Offensive coordinator, quarterbacks coach
Chris Ash	Defensive coordinator, defensive backs coach
Del Alexander	Wide receivers coach
Bob Bostad	Offensive line coach, run game coordinator
DeMontie Cross	Safeties, special teams coach
Thomas Hammock	Running backs coach
Dave Huxtable	Linebackers coach
Charlie Partridge	Associate head coach, co-defensive coordinator, defensive line coach
Joe Rudolph	Tight ends coach, recruiting coordinator
Terrance Jamison	Defensive quality control coach

=== Roster ===
(as of October 6, 2011)
Quarterbacks: 2 Joel Stave – Freshman; 5 Jon Budmayr – (redshirt) Sophomore; 10 Curt Phillips – (redshirt) Junior; 11 Joe Brennan – (redshirt) Freshman; 12 Nate Tice – (redshirt) Senior; 16 Russell Wilson – (redshirt) Senior; Wide receivers: 1 Nick Toon – (redshirt) Senior; 4 Jared Abbrederis – (redshirt) Sophomore; 6 Kenzel Doe – Freshman; 8 Isaiah Williams – (redshirt) Freshman; 13 Lance Baretz – Freshman; 14 Drew McAdams – (redshirt) Freshman; 15 Jeff Duckworth – (redshirt) Sophomore; 16 Chukwuma Offor – (redshirt) Senior; 17 Derek Hasanoglu – Freshman; 19 Manasseh Garner – Sophomore; 23 Jordan Fredrick – Freshman; 24 Fred Willis – Freshman; 31 Connor Cummins – (redshirt) Freshman; 32 Jake Stengel – Freshman; 81 A.J. Jordan – Freshman; 89 Chase Hammond – (redshirt) Freshman; Offensive line: 56 Riki Kodanko – (redshirt) Freshman; 58 Ricky Wagner – (redshirt) Junior; 60 Jake Current – Senior; 61 Tyler Marz – Freshman; 63 Casey Dehn – (redshirt) Sophomore; 64 Robert Burge – (redshirt) Junior; 65 Jonathan Coon – Freshman; 66 Peter Konz – (redshirt) Junior; 67 Josh Oglesby – (redshirt) Senior; 70 Kevin Zeitler – Senior; 71 Ray Ball – Freshman; 72 Travis Frederick – (redshirt) Sophomore; 73 Dallas Lewallen – (redshirt) Freshman; 75 Zac Matthias – (redshirt) Sophomore; 78 Rob Havenstein – (redshirt) Freshman; 79 Ryan Groy – (redshirt) Sophomore	Running backs: 3 Melvin Gordon – Freshman; 20 James White – Sophomore; 22 Jeffery Lewis – (redshirt) Freshman; 26 Derek Straus – Freshman; 28 Montee Ball – Junior; 29 Miles Groeschel – Freshman; 27 Kyle Zuleger – (redshirt) Sophomore; 34 Bradie Ewing – Senior; 42 Jason Hengel – (redshirt) Freshman; Tight ends: 46 Austin Traylor – Freshman; 48 Jacob Pedersen – (redshirt) Sophomore; 49 Sam Arneson – Freshman; 81 Brock DeCicco – (redshirt) Sophomore; 82 Jake Byrne – Senior; 87 Scot MacMillan – Freshman; 85 Brian Wozniak – (redshirt) Sophomore; 86 Sherard Cadogan – (redshirt) Freshman	Defensive line: 11 David Gilbert – Junior; 41 Jesse Hayes – Freshman; 45 Warren Herring – (redshirt) Freshman; 51 Tyler Dippel – (redshirt) Sophomore; 54 Kyle Costigan – (redshirt) Freshman; 55 Eriks Briedis – (redshirt) Junior; 58 Jacob Ninneman – (redshirt) Freshman; 74 Konrad Zagzebski – (redshirt) Freshman; 77 Bryce Gilbert – (redshirt) Freshman; 87 Ethan Hemer – (redshirt) Sophomore; 91 Jordan Kohout – (redshirt) Sophomore; 92 Pat Muldoon – (redshirt) Sophomore; 93 Louis Nzegwu – (redshirt) Senior; 94 Joseph McNamara – (redshirt) Freshman; 95 Patrick Butrym – (redshirt) Senior; 96 Beau Allen – Sophomore; 97 Brendan Kelly – (redshirt); 99 Junior Wherry -Junior; Linebackers: 9 Kevin Claxton – Senior; 13 Conor O'Neill – (redshirt) Sophomore; 17 A.J. Fenton – (redshirt) Sophomore; 28 Coddye Ring-Noonan – (redshirt) Junior; 30 Derek Landisch – Freshman; 34 Derek Watt – Freshman; 36 Ethan Armstrong – (redshirt) Sophomore; 38 Cameron Ontko – (redshirt) Freshman; 41 Greg Russo – Senior; 42 Cody Byers – (redshirt) Freshman; 44 Chris Borland – Sophomore; 46 Willie Resop – (redshirt) Freshman; 48 Jacob Keefer – Freshman; 50 Josh Harrison – (redshirt) Freshman; 52 Nick Hill – (redshirt) Sophomore; 53 Mike Taylor – (redshirt) Junior; 57 Ben Ruechel – (redshirt) Freshman; 59 Marcus Trotter – (redshirt) Freshman	Defensive backs: 3 Jameson Wright – (redshirt) Freshman; 5 Andrew Lukasko – (redshirt) Senior; 7 Aaron Henry – (redshirt) Senior; 8 Tyler Leonhard – Freshman; 10 Devin Smith – Senior; 12 Dezmen Southward – (redshirt) Sophomore; 14 Marcus Cromartie – (redshirt) Junior; 21 Peniel Jean – (redshirt) Freshman; 22 Darius Feaster – (redshirt) Sophomore; 23 Jerry Ponio – (redshirt) Sophomore; 24 Shelton Johnson – (redshirt) Junior; 25 Adam Hampton – (redshirt) Senior; 26 Antonio Fenelus – Senior; 29 Terrance Floyd – Freshman; 31 Josh Peprah – (redshirt) Sophomore; 32 Devin Gaulden – Freshman; 37 Michael Caputo – Freshman; 39 Darius Hillary – Freshman; 43 Michael Trotter – (redshirt) Freshman; 47 Frank Tamakloe – (redshirt) Freshman; Punters: 90 Drew Meyer – Freshman; 98 Brad Nortman – Senior; Place kickers: 18 Philip Welch – (redshirt) Senior; 94 Kyle French – (redshirt) Freshman; 96 Alec Lerner – (redshirt) Sophomore; Long snappers: 56 James McGuire – Sophomore; 62 Kyle Wojta – (redshirt) Senior

=== Regular starters ===
Position	Player
Quarterback	Russell Wilson
Running back	Montee Ball
Fullback	Bradie Ewing
Wide receiver	Nick Toon
Wide receiver	Jared Abbrederis
Tight end	Jacob Pedersen / Jake Byrne
Left tackle	Ricky Wagner
Left guard	Travis Frederick
Center	Peter Konz
Right guard	Kevin Zeitler
Right tackle	Josh Oglesby
Kicker	Philip Welch

Position	Player
Defensive end	Louis Nzegwu
Defensive tackle	Patrick Butrym
Defensive tackle	Ethan Hemer / Jordan Kohout
Defensive end	Brendan Kelly
Outside linebacker	Kevin Claxton
Middle linebacker	Chris Borland
Outside linebacker	Mike Taylor
Cornerback	Antonio Fenelus
Strong safety	Shelton Johnson
Free safety	Aaron Henry
Cornerback	Marcus Cromartie
Punter	Brad Nortman

=== Recruiting ===
College recruiting (2011)
Name	Hometown	School	Height	Weight	40^{‡}	Commit date
James Adeyanju; DE	Chicago, IL	Curie HS	6 ft 2 in (1.88 m)	250 lb (110 kg)	4.6	Oct 30, 2010
James Adeyanju; DE	Recruit ratings: Scout: Rivals: (77)					
Sam Arneson; TE	Merrill, WI	Merrill HS	6 ft 4 in (1.93 m)	233 lb (106 kg)	4.7	Apr 15, 2010
Sam Arneson; TE	Recruit ratings: Scout: Rivals: (78)					
Ray Ball; OL	Westerville, OH	Westerville South HS	6 ft 7 in (2.01 m)	320 lb (150 kg)	N/A	Oct 18, 2010
Ray Ball; OL	Recruit ratings: Scout: Rivals: (77)					
Mike Caputo; DB	Imperial, PA	West Allegheny HS	6 ft 1 in (1.85 m)	195 lb (88 kg)	4.5	Aug 10, 2010
Mike Caputo; DB	Recruit ratings: Scout: Rivals: (77)					
Kenzel Doe; WR	Oak Ridge, NC	Oak Ridge Military Academy	5 ft 8 in (1.73 m)	171 lb (78 kg)	4.4	Oct 6, 2010
Kenzel Doe; WR	Recruit ratings: Scout: Rivals: (75)					
Terrance Floyd; DB	Boynton Beach, FL	Santaluces HS	5 ft 10 in (1.78 m)	188 lb (85 kg)	N/A	Jul 30, 2010
Terrance Floyd; DB	Recruit ratings: Scout: Rivals: (77)					
Jordan Fredrick; DB	Madison, WI	Madison Memorial HS	6 ft 3 in (1.91 m)	210 lb (95 kg)	4.5	Jul 5, 2010
Jordan Fredrick; DB	Recruit ratings: Scout: Rivals: (75)					
Devin Gaulden; DB	Fort Lauderdale, FL	University School	5 ft 10 in (1.78 m)	175 lb (79 kg)	4.6	Dec 20, 2010
Devin Gaulden; DB	Recruit ratings: Scout: Rivals: (78)					
Melvin Gordon; RB	Kenosha, WI	Bradford HS	6 ft 0 in (1.83 m)	185 lb (84 kg)	4.5	Dec 5, 2010
Melvin Gordon; RB	Recruit ratings: Scout: Rivals: (79)					
Jesse Hayes; DE	Cincinnati, OH	Moeller HS	6 ft 4 in (1.93 m)	230 lb (100 kg)	N/A	Oct 31, 2010
Jesse Hayes; DE	Recruit ratings: Scout: Rivals: (78)					
Darius Hillary; DB	Cincinnati, OH	Sycamore HS	5 ft 10 in (1.78 m)	171 lb (78 kg)	4.8	Nov 16, 2010
Darius Hillary; DB	Recruit ratings: Scout: Rivals: (75)					
A.J. Jordan; WR	Trotwood, OH	Trotwood-Madison HS	6 ft 2 in (1.88 m)	165 lb (75 kg)	4.4	Oct 20, 2010
A.J. Jordan; WR	Recruit ratings: Scout: Rivals: (79)					
Jake Keefer; LB	Baldwin, WI	Baldwin-Woodville HS	6 ft 4 in (1.93 m)	215 lb (98 kg)	N/A	Mar 21, 2010
Jake Keefer; LB	Recruit ratings: Scout: Rivals: (78)					
Derek Landisch; LB	Nashotah, WI	Arrowhead HS	6 ft 0 in (1.83 m)	218 lb (99 kg)	4.6	Jun 29, 2010
Derek Landisch; LB	Recruit ratings: Scout: Rivals: (74)					
Austin Maly; TE	Waunakee, WI	Waunakee HS	6 ft 5 in (1.96 m)	220 lb (100 kg)	4.7	May 25, 2010
Austin Maly; TE	Recruit ratings: Scout: Rivals: (76)					
Tyler Marz; OL	Springfield, MN	Springfield HS	6 ft 8 in (2.03 m)	280 lb (130 kg)	5.3	Dec 9, 2010
Tyler Marz; OL	Recruit ratings: Scout: Rivals: (45)					
Austin Taylor; TE	Columbus, OH	Walnut Ridge HS	6 ft 4 in (1.93 m)	210 lb (95 kg)	4.7	Nov 19, 2010
Austin Taylor; TE	Recruit ratings: Scout: Rivals: (78)					
Derek Watt; LB	Pewaukee, WI	Pewaukee HS	6 ft 2 in (1.88 m)	215 lb (98 kg)	NA	Dec 22, 2010
Derek Watt; LB	Recruit ratings: Scout: Rivals: (77)					
Frederick Willis; WR	Brookfield, WI	Brookfield Academy	6 ft 1 in (1.85 m)	195 lb (88 kg)	NA	Aug 30, 2010
Frederick Willis; WR	Recruit ratings: Scout: Rivals: (45)					
Overall recruit ranking: Scout: 36
‡ Refers to 40-yard dash; Note: In many cases, Scout, Rivals, 247Sports, On3, and ESPN may conflict in their listings of height, weight and 40 time.; In these cases, the average was taken. ESPN grades are on a 100-point scale.; Sources: "Wisconsin Badgers Commits 2011". ESPN.; "2011 Team Ranking". Rivals.com.

== Awards ==
=== Watchlists and preseason awards ===
- Montee Ball

Doak Walker Award
Maxwell Award

Preseason second-team All-American by Consensus Draft Services
Preseason third-team All-American by Phil Steele
Preseason first-team All-Big Ten by Athlon, Blue Ribbon and Phil Steele

- Chris Borland

Butkus Award

Preseason first-team All-Big Ten by Phil Steele
Preseason second-team All-Big Ten by Athlon

- Antonio Fenelus

Jim Thorpe Award

Preseason second-team All-Big Ten by Athlon and Phil Steele

- Aaron Henry

Lott IMPACT Award

Preseason first-team All-Big Ten by Blue Ribbon and Phil Steele
Preseason second-team All-Big Ten by Athlon

- Jordan Kohout

Preseason honorable mention All-American by Consensus Draft Services

- Peter Konz

Lombardi Award
Rimington Trophy

Preseason second-team All-American by Consensus Draft Services
Preseason third-team All-Big Ten by Athlon
Preseason fourth-team All-Big Ten by Phil Steele

- Brad Nortman

Preseason first-team All-Big Ten by Athlon, Blue Ribbon and Phil Steele

- Louis Nzegwu

Preseason fourth-team All-Big Ten by Phil Steele

- Mike Taylor

Butkus Award

Preseason first-team All-Big Ten by Athlon and Blue Ribbon
Preseason second-team All-Big Ten by Phil Steele

- Nick Toon

Preseason fourth-team All-Big Ten by Phil Steele

- Philip Welch

Lou Groza Award

Preseason third-team All-Big Ten by Athlon and Phil Steele

- James White

Doak Walker Award
Maxwell Award
Walter Camp Award

Preseason second-team All-Big Ten by Phil Steele
Preseason third-team All-Big Ten by Athlon

- Russell Wilson

Davey O'Brien Award
Maxwell Award

- Kevin Zeitler

Lombardi Award
Outland Trophy

Preseason fourth-team All-American by Phil Steele
Preseason honorable mention All-American by Consensus Draft Services
Preseason first-team All-Big Ten by Phil Steele
Preseason second-team All-Big Ten by Athlon

=== Postseason awards ===
- Jared Abbrederis

Honorable mention All-Big Ten (Consensus)

- Montee Ball

Graham-George Offensive Player of the Year
Ameche-Dayne Running Back of the Year
First team All-Big Ten (Consensus)

- Chris Borland

First team All-Big Ten (Consensus)

- Patrick Butrym

Honorable mention All-Big Ten (Consensus)

- Antonio Fenelus

First team All-Big Ten (Media) / Honorable mention (Coaches)

- Travis Frederick

Second team All-Big Ten (Consensus)

- Aaron Henry

First team All-Big Ten (Coaches) / Honorable mention (Media)

- Peter Konz

First team All-Big Ten (Media) / Honorable mention (Coaches)

- Brad Nortman

Honorable mention All-Big Ten (Consensus)

- Josh Oglesby

First team All-Big Ten (Consensus)

- Jacob Pedersen

Second team All-Big Ten (Media)

- Mike Taylor

First team All-Big Ten (Media) / Second team (Coaches)

- Nick Toon

Second team All-Big Ten (Coaches) / Honorable mention (Media)

- Ricky Wagner

Honorable mention All-Big Ten (Consensus)

- Philip Welch

Honorable mention All-Big Ten (Media)

- Russell Wilson

Griese-Brees Quarterback of the Year
First team All-Big Ten (Consensus)
2011 Big Ten Championship Game Grange-Griffin MVP Award

- Kevin Zeitler

First team All-Big Ten (Consensus)

== Statistics ==
=== Passing ===
Note: G = Games played; COMP = Completions; ATT = Attempts; COMP % = Completion percentage; YDS = Passing yards; TD = Passing touchdowns; INT = Interceptions; EFF = Passing efficiency

Pos.	Player	G	COMP	ATT	COMP %	YDS	TD	INT	EFF
RB	Montee Ball	14	2	2	100.0	57	1	0	504.4
QB	Joe Brennan	6	6	15	40.0	48	0	1	53.5
QB	Russell Wilson	14	225	309	72.8	3,175	33	4	191.8

=== Rushing ===
Note: G = Games played; ATT = Attempts; YDS = Yards; AVG = Average yard per carry; LG = Longest run; TD = Rushing touchdowns

Pos.	Player	G	ATT	YDS	AVG	LG	TD
WR	Jared Abbrederis	14	11	62	5.6	21	0
RB	Montee Ball	14	307	1,923	6.3	54	33
QB	Joe Brennan	6	6	9	1.5	31	1
RB	Melvin Gordon	4	20	98	4.9	14	1
RB	Jeffrey Lewis	7	33	187	5.7	41	1
RB	James White	13	141	713	5.1	49	6
QB	Russell Wilson	14	79	338	4.3	46	5
RB	Kyle Zuleger	13	1	6	6.0	6	0

=== Receiving ===
Note: G = Games played; REC = Receptions; YDS = Yards; AVG = Average yard per catch; LG = Longest catch; TD = Receiving touchdowns

Pos.	Player	G	REC	YDS	AVG	LG	TD
WR	Jared Abbrederis	14	55	933	17.0	51	8
RB	Montee Ball	14	24	306	12.8	63	6
TE	Jake Byrne	14	1	14	14.0	14	0
WR	Kenzel Doe	9	2	4	2.0	3	0
WR	Jeff Duckworth	13	15	230	15.3	66	1
FB	Bradie Ewing	14	20	246	12.3	41	0
WR	Manassen Garner	10	2	45	22.5	27	0
RB	Jeffrey Lewis	7	2	14	7.0	8	0
TE	Jacob Pedersen	14	30	356	11.9	55	8
WR	Nick Toon	13	64	926	14.5	59	10
RB	James White	13	15	150	10.0	40	0
QB	Russell Wilson	14	3	56	18.7	32	1

=== Kick and punt returning ===
Note: G = Games played; PR = Punt returns; PYDS = Punt return yards; PLG = Punt return long; KR = Kick returns; KYDS = Kick return yards; KLG = Kick return long; TD = Total return touchdowns

Pos.	Player	G	PR	PYDS	PLG	KR	KYDS	KLG	Total Return TDs
WR	Jared Abbrederis	14	20	315	60	28	689	60	1
WR	Kenzel Doe	9	1	13	13	3	41	24	0
FB	Bradie Ewing	14	1	4	4	0	0	0	0
RB	Melvin Gordon	4	0	0	0	1	23	23	0
TE	Jacob Pedersen	14	0	0	0	1	0	0	0
RB	James White	13	0	0	0	15	315	40	0
TE	Brian Wozniak	13	0	0	0	1	4	4	0

=== Kicking ===
Note: G = Games played; FGM = Field goals made; FGA = Field goals attempted; LG = Field goal long; XPT = Extra points made; XPT ATT = XPT attempted; TP = Total points

Pos.	Player	G	FGM	FGA	LG	XPT	XPT ATT	TP
K	Kyle French	6	3	5	29	26	27	35
K	Philip Welch	10	5	6	52	54	55	69

=== Punting ===
Note: G = Games played; P = Punts; YDS = Yards; AVG = Average per punt; LG = Punt long; In20 = Punts inside the 20; TB = Touchbacks

Pos.	Player	G	P	YDS	AVG	LG	In20	TB
P	Brad Nortman	14	46	1,943	42.2	74	19	3

=== Defensive ===
Note: G = Games played; Solo = Solo tackles; Ast = Assisted tackles; Total = Total tackles; TFL-Yds = Tackles for loss-yards lost; Sack = Sacks; INT = Interceptions; PD = Passes defended; FF = Forced fumbles; FR = Forced recoveries

Pos.	Player	G	Solo	Ast	Total	TFL-Yds	Sack	INT	PD	FF	FR
LB	Mike Taylor	14	60	90	150	9.0–23	2.0	2	5	3	2
LB	Chris Borland	14	64	79	143	19.0–39	2.5	2	7	5	0
S	Aaron Henry	14	44	23	67	3.0–6	1.0	4	8	0	0
S	Shelton Johnson	13	23	31	54	6.0–10	0.0	4	8	1	0
CB	Antonio Fenelus	14	33	18	51	3.0–7	0.0	4	9	0	0
CB	Marcus Cromartie	14	26	21	47	0.5–2	0.0	0	3	0	1
LB	Kevin Claxton	13	18	29	47	6.5–13	1.0	0	0	0	0
DE	Louis Nzegwu	14	16	22	38	7.0–28	4.5	0	2	1	1
S	Dezmond Southward	14	16	19	35	0.0–0	0.0	0	2	2	0
DE	Brendan Kelly	14	14	21	35	5.0–27	3.0	0	1	2	0
DT	Ethan Hemer	14	12	22	34	1.0–9	1.0	0	1	0	0
LB	Ethan Armstrong	12	14	15	29	2.0–11	1.0	0	1	0	0
LB	Conor O'Neill	14	15	14	29	1.5–13	0.0	0	0	2	1
DE	Tyler Dippel	14	11	16	27	3.0–18	1.0	0	0	0	0
CB	Peniel Jean	14	17	7	24	1.0–1	0.0	0	2	0	0
DT	Patrick Butrym	14	5	18	23	3.5–16	1.0	0	2	1	0
DT	Beau Allen	14	11	11	22	5.5–23	4.0	0	1	0	0
LB	Derek Landisch	14	7	13	20	1.0–1	0.0	0	0	0	1
DT	Jordan Kohout	14	8	14	22	2.5–5	0.0	0	0	0	1
DL	Pat Muldoon	12	7	7	14	0.5–0	0.0	0	3	0	0
DE	David Gilbert	4	4	6	10	3.5–27	3.0	0	0	1	0
DE	Warren Herring	8	3	6	9	1.0–2	0.0	0	0	0	0
CB	Devin Smith	2	6	1	7	0.0–0	0.0	0	1	0	0
CB	Adam Hampton	12	4	2	6	0.0–0	0.0	0	0	0	0
LB	Marcus Trotter	5	2	2	4	0.0–0	0.0	0	0	0	0
LS	Kyle Wojta	13	3	0	3	0.0–0	0.0	0	0	0	0
DT	Kyle Costigan	3	0	3	3	0.0–0	0.0	0	0	0	0
CB	Devin Gaulden	6	3	0	3	0.0–0	0.0	0	0	0	0
DB	Andrew Lukasko	13	2	1	3	0.0–0	0.0	0	1	0	2
DT	Bryce Gilbert	4	1	2	3	0.0–0	0.0	0	0	0	0
DL	Konrad Zagzebski	5	1	1	2	0.0–0	0.0	0	0	0	0
DL	Eriks Briedis	1	0	1	1	0.0–0	0.0	0	0	0	0
LB	A.J. Fenton	12	0	1	1	0.0–0	0.0	0	0	0	0
DB	Michael Trotter	12	1	0	1	0.0–0	0.0	0	0	0	0
LB	Cameron Ontko	3	0	1	1	0.0–0	0.0	0	0	0	0

== 2012 NFL draft class ==
2012 NFL draft selections
Round	Pick #	Team	Player	Position
1	27	Cincinnati Bengals	Kevin Zeitler	Guard
2	55	Atlanta Falcons	Peter Konz	Center
3	75	Seattle Seahawks	Russell Wilson	Quarterback
4	122	New Orleans Saints	Nick Toon	Wide receiver
5	157	Atlanta Falcons	Bradie Ewing	Fullback
6	207	Carolina Panthers	Brad Nortman	Punter

=== Signed undrafted free agents ===
- DT Patrick Butrym, San Francisco 49ers
- TE Jake Byrne, New Orleans Saints
- CB Antonio Fenelus, Indianapolis Colts
- SS Aaron Henry, Oakland Raiders
- DE Louis Nzegwu, Atlanta Falcons
- OT Josh Oglesby, Washington Redskins
- LS Kyle Wojta, Chicago Bears
