= 2011 All-Big Ten Conference football team =

American college football all-star team

The 2011 All-Big Ten Conference football team consists of American football players chosen as All-Big Ten Conference players for the 2011 Big Ten Conference football season. The conference recognizes two official All-Big Ten selectors: (1) the Big Ten conference coaches selected separate offensive and defensive units and named first- and second-team players (the "Coaches" team); and (2) a panel of sports writers and broadcasters covering the Big Ten also selected offensive and defensive units and named first- and second-team players (the "Media" team).

== Offensive selections ==
=== Quarterbacks ===
- Russell Wilson, Wisconsin (Coaches-1; Media-1)
- Kirk Cousins, Michigan State (Coaches-2)
- Denard Robinson, Michigan (Media-2)

=== Running backs ===
- Montee Ball, Wisconsin (Coaches-1; Media-1)
- Rex Burkhead, Nebraska (Coaches-1; Media-1)
- Marcus Coker, Iowa (Coaches-2; Media-2)
- Silas Redd, Penn State (Coaches-2; Media-2)

=== Receivers ===
- A.J. Jenkins, Illinois (Coaches-1; Media-1)
- Marvin McNutt, Iowa (Coaches-1; Media-1)
- B. J. Cunningham, Michigan State (Coaches-2; Media-2)
- Nick Toon, Wisconsin (Coaches-2)
- Jeremy Ebert, Northwestern (Media-2)

=== Centers ===
- David Molk, Michigan (Coaches-1; Media-2)
- Peter Konz, Wisconsin (Media-1)
- Mike Caputo, Nebraska (Coaches-2 [tie])
- Mike Brewster, Ohio State (Coaches-2 [tie])

=== Guards ===
- Joel Foreman, Michigan State (Coaches-1; Media-1)
- Kevin Zeitler, Wisconsin (Coaches-1; Media-1)
- Travis Frederick, Wisconsin (Coaches-2; Media-2)
- Adam Gettis, Iowa (Coaches-2)
- Spencer Long, Nebraska (Media-2)

=== Tackles ===
- Riley Reiff, Iowa (Coaches-1; Media-1)
- Josh Oglesby, Wisconsin (Coaches-1; Media-1)
- Mike Adams, Ohio State (Coaches-2; Media-2)
- Taylor Lewan, Michigan (Coaches-2)
- Jeff Allen, Illinois (Media-2)

=== Tight ends ===
- Drake Dunsmore, Northwestern (Coaches-1; Media-1)
- Brian Linthicum, Michigan State (Coaches-2)
- Jacob Pedersen, Wisconsin (Media-2)

== Defensive selections ==
=== Defensive linemen ===
- Whitney Mercilus, Illinois (Coaches-1; Media-1)
- Jerel Worthy, Michigan State (Coaches-1; Media-1)
- Devon Still, Penn State (Coaches-1; Media-1)
- John Simon, Ohio State (Coaches-1; Media-2)
- Kawann Short, Purdue (Coaches-2; Media-1)
- Michael Buchanan, Illinois (Coaches-2; Media-2)
- Mike Martin, Michigan (Coaches-2; Media-2)
- William Gholston, Michigan State (Coaches-2; Media-2)
- Mike Daniels, Iowa (Coaches-2)
- Jack Crawford, Penn State (Coaches-2)
- Broderick Binns, Iowa (Media-2)

=== Linebackers ===
- Lavonte David, Nebraska (Coaches-1; Media-1)
- Chris Borland, Wisconsin (Coaches-1; Media-1)
- Gerald Hodges, Penn State (Coaches-1; Media-2)
- Mike Taylor, Wisconsin (Coaches-2; Media-2)
- Max Bullough, Michigan State (Coaches-2)
- Andrew Sweat, Ohio State (Coaches-2)
- Denicos Allen, Michigan State (Media-2)
- Jonathan Brown, Illinois (Media-2)

=== Defensive backs ===
- Alfonzo Dennard, Nebraska (Coaches-1; Media-1)
- Johnny Adams, Michigan State (Coaches-1; Media-2)
- Shaun Prater, Iowa (Coaches-1)
- Aaron Henry, Wisconsin (Coaches-1)
- Trenton Robinson, Michigan State (Media-1)
- Brian Peters, Northwestern (Media-1)
- Antonio Fenelus, Wisconsin (Media-1)
- Isaiah Lewis, Michigan State (Coaches-2; Media-2)
- Nick Sukay, Penn State (Coaches-2; Media-2)
- C. J. Barnett, Ohio State (Coaches-2)
- Ricardo Allen, Purdue (Coaches-2)
- Micah Hyde, Iowa (Media-2)

== Special teams ==
=== Kickers ===
- Brett Maher, Nebraska (Coaches-1; Media-1)
- Carson Wiggs, Purdue (Coaches-2)
- Anthony Fera, Penn State (Media-2)

=== Punter ===
- Brett Maher, Nebraska (Coaches-1; Media-1)
- Cody Webster, Purdue (Coaches-2; Media-2)

== Key ==
Bold = Consensus first-team selection by both the coaches and media

Coaches = Selected by the Big Ten Conference coaches

Media = Selected by the conference media

== See also ==
- 2011 College Football All-America Team
