= Nick Toon =

American football player (born 1988)

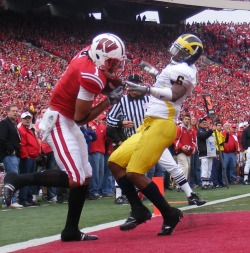
- Toon (#1) scoring a touchdown against Michigan

No. 88, 81
- Position: Wide receiver

Personal information
- Born: November 4, 1988 (age 38); Middleton, Wisconsin, U.S.
- Listed height: 6 ft 2 in (1.88 m)
- Listed weight: 215 lb (98 kg)

Career information
- High school: Middleton
- College: Wisconsin (2007–2011)
- NFL draft: 2012: 4th round, 122nd overall pick

Career history
- New Orleans Saints (2012–2014); St. Louis Rams (2015)

Awards and highlights
- Second-team All-Big Ten (2011)

Career NFL statistics
- Receptions: 21
- Receiving yards: 283
- Receiving touchdowns: 1
- Stats at Pro Football Reference

Nicholas Adam Toon (born November 4, 1988) is an American former professional football player who was a wide receiver in the National Football League (NFL). He played college football for the Wisconsin Badgers and was selected by the New Orleans Saints in the fourth round of the 2012 NFL draft. He is the son of former New York Jets wide receiver Al Toon.

== Early life ==
Toon attended Middleton High School in Middleton, Wisconsin. He played as a wide receiver for the Middleton Cardinals football team, and was named a first-team All-state selection in 2006 after earning second-team honors as a junior in 2005. He was a two-time, first-team All-area at kick returner. He was named to inaugural All-American Offense-Defense Bowl. He caught 26 passes for 425 yards and six scores as a junior. He served as the team captain in his senior year, leading his team with 51 receptions for 799 yards and 17 returns for 430 yards, totalling 13 touchdowns. Toon also lettered in track & field.

Toon was ranked among the top 30 players in Midwest and earned All-America honors from SuperPrep. He was rated among the top 25 wide receivers nationally and the No. 3 player overall in Wisconsin by Rivals.com.

== College career ==
=== College statistics ===
Year	Team	Receptions	Yards	Average	TDs
2007	Wisconsin	Redshirt			
2008	Wisconsin	17	257	15.1	1
2009	Wisconsin	54	805	14.9	4
2010	Wisconsin	35	459	13.1	3
2011	Wisconsin	64	926	14.5	10
College totals		170	2,447	14.4	18

== Professional career ==
Pre-draft measurables
Height	Weight	Arm length	Hand span	40-yard dash	10-yard split	20-yard split	Vertical jump	Broad jump	Bench press
6 ft 1 7/8 in (1.88 m)	215 lb (98 kg)	32 1/2 in (0.83 m)	9 in (0.23 m)	4.43 s	1.58 s	2.54 s	39 in (0.99 m)	10 ft 10 in (3.30 m)	18 reps
All values from NFL Combine and Pro Day

=== New Orleans Saints ===
Toon was selected by the New Orleans Saints in the fourth round (122nd pick overall) in the 2012 NFL draft. He was placed on injured reserve before the start of the 2012 season. He scored his first touchdown on November 30, 2014, on a pass from Drew Brees against the Pittsburgh Steelers.

On September 1, 2015, he was waived/injured by the Saints. After Toon cleared waivers, he was placed on the Saints' injured reserve list. He was waived off the team's injured reserve with an injury settlement on September 8.

During his two seasons with the Saints, he appeared in 16 games, made 21 catches for 283 yards and 1 touchdown.

=== St. Louis Rams ===
The St. Louis Rams signed Toon to their practice squad on September 30, 2015. On May 11, 2016, the Rams cut Toon.
