= 2012 Senior Bowl =

2012 Nike Senior Bowl
- 63rd Senior Bowl
North Team	South Team
23	13
Head coach: Leslie Frazier (Minnesota Vikings)	Head coach: Mike Shanahan (Washington Redskins)
	1	2	3	4	Total
North	3	10	7	3	23
South	3	3	0	7	13
- Date: January 28, 2012
- Season: 2011
- Stadium: Ladd–Peebles Stadium
- Location: Mobile, Alabama
- MVP: Bobby Wagner
- Referee: Reggie Smith
- Halftime show: Alabama State University "Mighty Marching Hornets" and The Philadelphia Eagles Cheerleaders
- Attendance: 40,646

United States TV coverage
- Network: NFL Network
- Announcers: Paul Burmeister (Play-by-Play); Mike Mayock (Analyst); Charles Davis (Analyst); Rebecca Haarlow (Sidelines); Heath Evans (Sidelines)

The 2012 Senior Bowl was an all-star college football exhibition game featuring players from the 2011 college football season, and prospects for the 2012 draft of the professional National Football League (NFL). The 63rd edition of the Senior Bowl was won by the North team, 23–13.

The game was played on January 28, 2012, at 3 pm CST (4 p.m. Eastern time) at Ladd–Peebles Stadium in Mobile, Alabama, between "North" and "South" teams. This year's Senior Bowl concluded the 2011-12 post-season as the NFLPA's Texas vs The Nation game, which would have been played the following week, was canceled. The coaching staff of the Minnesota Vikings, led by head coach Leslie Frazier, coached the North team. The coaching staff of the Washington Redskins, led by head coach Mike Shanahan, coached the South team.

Coverage of the event was provided in high-definition on the NFL Network. Clothing company Nike was the sponsor for the first year, and provided apparel for the game.

== Rosters ==
=== North Team ===
No.	Name	Position	Height/Weight	School
75	Mike Adams	OL	6-7/323	Ohio State
71	Tony Bergstrom	OL	6-5 1/2/315	Utah
50	Mike Brewster	OL	6-4 1/4/310	Ohio State
44	Audie Cole	LB	6-4 1/8/258	NC State
8	Kirk Cousins	QB	6-2 1/2/209	Michigan State
81	Jack Crawford	DL	6-4 7/8/268	Penn State
99	Vinny Curry	DL	6-3/265	Marshall
4	Lavonte David	LB	6-0 1/2/225	Nebraska
28	Demario Davis	LB	6-3/230	Arkansas State
82	Michael Egnew	TE	6-5 1/4/251	Missouri
34	Bradie Ewing	FB	5-11 5/8/241	Wisconsin
13	Jamell Fleming	DB	5-10 5/8/202	Oklahoma
24	Donnie Fletcher	DB	6-0 1/4/201	Boston College
83	T. J. Graham	WR	5-11 3/8/182	NC State
1	Dan Herron	RB	5-9 1/4/212	Ohio State
84	Emil Igwenagu	TE	6-1 1/8/245	Massachusetts
18	George Iloka	DB	6-3 5/8/222	Boise State
2	Asa Jackson	DB	5-9 7/8/193	Cal Poly
56	Cam Johnson	LB	6-3 3/4/267	Virginia
52	James-Michael Johnson	LB	6-1 1/8/249	Nevada
23	Leonard Johnson	DB	5-9 7/8/198	Iowa State
78	Rishaw Johnson	OL	6-3 3/4/310	California (PA)
89	Marvin Jones	WR	6-1 7/8/198	California
56	Senio Kelemete	OL	6-3 1/2/300	Washington
85	Brian Linthicum	TE	6-3 3/4/249	Michigan State
8	D'Anton Lynn	DB	5-11 5/8/205	Penn State
22	Doug Martin	RB	5-9/219	Boise State
68	Mike Martin	DL	6-1 1/4/307	Michigan
92	Shea McClellin	DL	6-3 1/4/248	Boise State
7	Marvin McNutt	WR	6-2 1/2/216	Iowa
11	Kellen Moore	QB	5-11 3/4/191	Boise State
21	Josh Norman	DB	6-0 1/4/200	Coastal Carolina
97	Brad Nortman	P	6-2 5/8/207	Wisconsin
73	Kelechi Osemele	OL	6-5 3/8/333	Iowa State
23	Isaiah Pead	RB	5-9 7/8/193	Cincinnati
20	Chris Polk	RB	5-10 1/2/224	Washington
3	DeVier Posey	WR	6-1 5/8/209	Ohio State
88	Brian Quick	WR	6-3 1/2/222	Appalachian State
98	Kendall Reyes	DL	6-3 7/8/300	Connecticut
81	Gerell Robinson	WR	6-3 1/8/223	Arizona State
19	Trenton Robinson	DB	5-9 1/2/193	Michigan State
72	Mitchell Schwartz	OL	6-5 1/8/317	California
22	Harrison Smith	DB	6-1 3/4/212	Notre Dame
74	Alameda Ta'amu	DL	6-2 1/2/341	Washington
74	Johnnie Troutman	OL	6-4 1/8/325	Penn State
45	Bobby Wagner	LB	6-0 1/4/241	Utah State
37	Carson Wiggs	K	6-0 1/2/222	Purdue
16	Russell Wilson	QB	5-10 5/8/203	Wisconsin
90	Billy Winn	DL	6-3 3/8/296	Boise State
62	Kyle Wojta	LS	6-1 1/2/239	Wisconsin
95	Derek Wolfe	DL	6-5/300	Cincinnati
70	Kevin Zeitler	OL	6-3 7/8/315	Wisconsin

=== South Team ===
No.	Name	Position	Height/Weight	School
55	Emmanuel Acho	LB	6-1/235	Texas
4	Joe Adams	WR	5-10 1/2/174	Arkansas
26	Antonio Allen	DB	6-1 1/4/202	South Carolina
72	Jeff Allen	OL	6-4/306	Illinois
28	Vick Ballard	RB	5-10 1/8/217	Mississippi State
5	Dwight Bentley	DB	5-9 7/8/176	Louisiana-Lafayette
91	Jake Bequette	LB	6-4 1/2/264	Arkansas
61	Will Blackwell	OL	6-3 1/2/314	LSU
74	Philip Blake	OL	6-2 3/8/312	Baylor
2	Brandon Boykin	DB	5-9 1/4/183	Georgia
13	Nigel Bradham	LB	6-1 5/8/237	Florida State
70	James Brown	OL	6-3 1/2/307	Troy
47	Zach Brown	LB	6-1 3/8/236	North Carolina
29	Randy Bullock	K	5-9 3/8/207	Texas A&M
13	Drew Butler	P	6-1 1/8/199	Georgia
90	Quinton Coples	DL	6-5 3/4/281	North Carolina
33	Lennon Creer	RB	6-1/215	Louisiana Tech
82	Juron Criner	WR	6-2 1/8/220	Arizona
8	Nick Foles	QB	6-5/244	Arizona
87	Jeff Fuller	WR	6-4 1/8/217	Texas A&M
24	Terrance Ganaway	RB	5-11 1/2/241	Baylor
71	Cordy Glenn	OL	6-5 1/2/346	Georgia
89	Ladarius Green	TE	6-5 3/4/237	Louisiana-Lafayette
62	Josh Harris	LS	6-1 1/8/250	Auburn
19	Casey Hayward	DB	5-11/188	Vanderbilt
96	Jaye Howard	DL	6-3/292	Florida
6	Melvin Ingram	DL	6-1 7/8/276	South Carolina
97	Malik Jackson	DL	6-5/270	Tennessee
88	A.J. Jenkins	WR	6-0 1/8/192	Illinois
1	Janoris Jenkins	DB	5-9 3/4/191	North Alabama
94	Tony Jerod-Eddie	DL	6-4/303	Texas A&M
60	Ben Jones	OL	6-2 5/8/304	Georgia
85	Dwight Jones	WR	6-3 1/8/226	North Carolina
17	Ryan Lindley	QB	6-3 3/4/229	San Diego State
10	Markelle Martin	DB	6-0 3/4/203	Oklahoma State
76	Matt McCants	OL	6-5 5/8/309	UAB
24	DeQuan Menzie	DB	5-10 1/2/195	Alabama
32	Alfred Morris	FB	5-10 1/4/222	Florida Atlantic
19	Deangelo Peterson	TE	6-2 7/8/230	LSU
92	Tydreke Powell	DL	6-2 3/8/297	North Carolina
2	Chris Rainey	RB	5-8 3/8/174	Florida
93	Kheeston Randall	DL	6-4 1/2/297	Texas
51	Keenan Robinson	LB	6-3 1/8/240	Texas
77	Zebrie Sanders	OL	6-5 1/2/308	Florida State
44	Brad Smelley	TE	6-1 7/8/233	Alabama
31	Sean Spence	LB	5-11 3/8/228	Miami (FL)
4	Ryan Steed	DB	5-10 3/8/190	Furman
18	Brandon Taylor	DB	5-11 1/8/202	LSU
98	Brandon Thompson	DL	6-2/311	Clemson
41	Courtney Upshaw	DL	6-1 1/2/273	Alabama
73	William Vlachos	OL	6-0 3/8/306	Alabama
3	Brandon Weeden	QB	6-3 1/2/219	Oklahoma State

== Game summary ==
=== Scoring summary ===
Scoring Play	Score
1st Quarter
NORTH - Carson Wiggs 27-yard field goal, 04:18	NORTH 3 - 0
SOUTH - Randy Bullock 39-yard field goal, 05:40	TIED 3 - 3
2nd Quarter
NORTH - Marvin Jones 18-yard pass from Russell Wilson (Carson Wiggs kick), 02:29	NORTH 10 - 3
SOUTH - Randy Bullock 24-yard field goal, 07:18	NORTH 10 - 6
NORTH - Carson Wiggs 32-yard field goal, 00:26	NORTH 13 - 6
3rd Quarter
NORTH - Gerell Robinson 40-yard pass from Kirk Cousins (Carson Wiggs kick), 03:16	NORTH 20 - 6
4th Quarter
SOUTH - Juron Criner 20-yard pass from Nick Foles (Randy Bullock kick), 04:35	NORTH 20 - 13
NORTH - Carson Wiggs 28-yard field goal, 08:44	NORTH 23 - 13

=== Statistics ===
Statistics	North	South
First downs	17	15
Total offense, plays - yards	63-279	65-331
Rushes-yards (net)	33-69	20-36
Passing yards (net)	210	295
Passes, Att-Comp-Int	15-30-2	26-45-3
Time of Possession	30:10	29:50
