= Mike Taylor (linebacker, born 1989) =

American football player (born 1989)

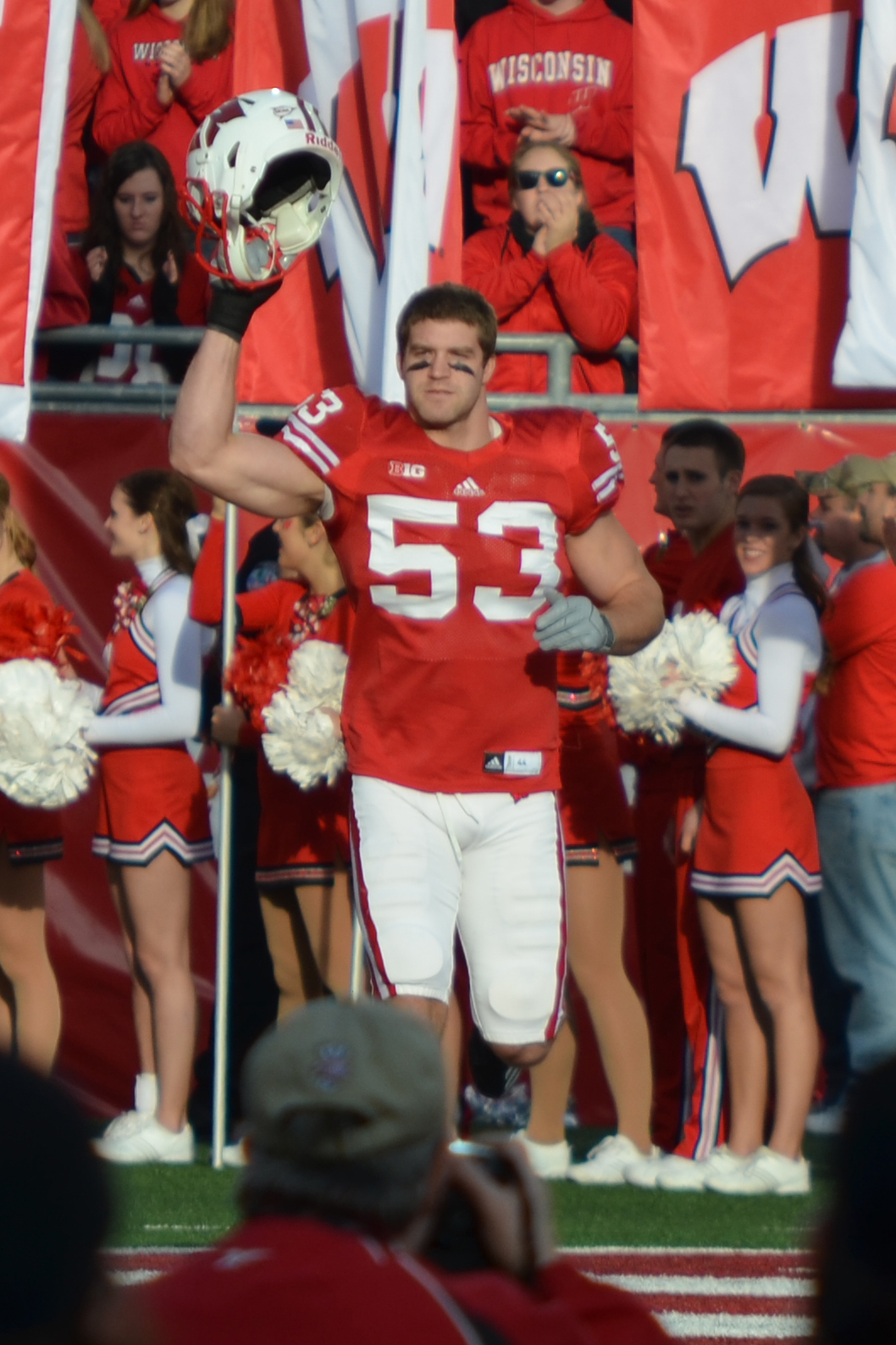
- Taylor with the Wisconsin Badgers

No. 53
- Position: Linebacker

Personal information
- Born: October 7, 1989 (age 37); Ashwaubenon, Wisconsin, U.S.
- Listed height: 6 ft 2 in (1.88 m)
- Listed weight: 222 lb (101 kg)

Career information
- High school: Ashwaubenon
- College: Wisconsin (2008–2012)
- NFL draft: 2013: undrafted

Career history
- Seattle Seahawks (2013)*; Seattle Seahawks (2014)
- * Offseason or practice squad member only

Awards and highlights
- First-team All-Big Ten (2012); Second-team All-Big Ten (2011); Big Ten All-Freshman Team by Sporting News (2009)

Mike Taylor (born October 7, 1989) is an American former football player who was a linebacker. He played college football for the Wisconsin Badgers.

== College career ==
=== 2008 ===
Taylor redshirted his first season. He was named Wisconsin's defensive scout player of the week at Indiana on November 8.

=== 2009 ===
Taylor was named on the Big Ten All-Freshman Team by Sporting News. Taylor played and started seven games as a freshman. Taylor suffered a season-ending knee injury against Iowa. He led the leam with 46 tackles at the time of his injury.

=== 2010 ===
Taylor was named consensus honorable mention All-Big Ten. Taylor played in and started 12 games. He was second on the team in tackles-for-loss, tied for second in interceptions and fourth in tackles.

=== 2011 ===
Taylor was named first-team All-Big Ten by the media and second-team by the coaches. He was also chosen as UW's co-Jimmy Demetral Team MVP. He was named Big Ten Defensive Player of the week two times in 2011. First was against Oregon State after recording nine tackles, forcing a fumble, recording 1.5 TFLs and adding a sack. Second was against Nebraska after recording 14 tackles with one tackle for loss and one interception. Taylor also recorded a career high 22 tackles against Ohio State, the most by a Badger since 1998. Before the season, Taylor was on the watchlist for the Butkus Award which is awarded to the nations best linebacker. Taylor was also listed on the preseason watchlists for All-Big Ten, first-team by Althon and Blue Ribbon and second-team by Phil Steele.

=== 2012 ===
Taylor was named first-team All-Big Ten by the media and honorable mention by the coaches. Recorded a season high 15 tackles twice against Utah State on September 15 and Nebraska on September 29. Before the season Taylor was on the watchlists for the Bronko Nagurski Trophy, Lombardi Award and the Lott IMPACT Award.

=== College statistics ===
| Year | Team | Solo | Ast | Total | TFL | Sack | INT |
|---|---|---|---|---|---|---|---|
| 2009 | Wisconsin | 21 | 25 | 46 | 6.5 | 1.0 | 1 |
| 2010 | Wisconsin | 27 | 31 | 58 | 8.0 | 1.0 | 2 |
| 2011 | Wisconsin | 60 | 90 | 150 | 9.0 | 2.0 | 2 |
| 2012 | Wisconsin | 69 | 54 | 123 | 15.0 | 3.0 | 0 |
| College totals | | 177 | 200 | 377 | 38.5 | 7.0 | 5 |

== Professional career ==
Taylor underwent surgery for a sports hernia in March 2013 and therefore missed the NFL Scouting Combine and the Wisconsin Pro Day. Taylor went undrafted during the 2013 NFL draft. Since October 7, 2013, Taylor has had tryouts with the Green Bay Packers, Kansas City Chiefs and Seattle Seahawks.

On December 11, 2013, Taylor signed with the Seattle Seahawks practice squad. He was released on December 19.

The Seahawks signed Taylor to a futures deal on February 10, 2014. On August 11, Taylor was placed on the injured-reserve/waived list.
