= Jared Abbrederis =

American football player (born 1990)

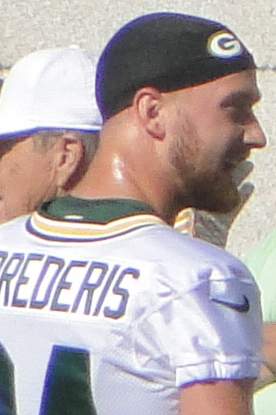
- Abbrederis with the Green Bay Packers in 2014

No. 84, 10
- Position: Wide receiver

Personal information
- Born: December 17, 1990 (age 35); West Allis, Wisconsin, U.S.
- Listed height: 6 ft 1 in (1.85 m)
- Listed weight: 195 lb (88 kg)

Career information
- High school: Wautoma (WI)
- College: Wisconsin (2009–2013)
- NFL draft: 2014: 5th round, 176th overall pick

Career history
- Green Bay Packers (2014–2016); Detroit Lions (2017)

Awards and highlights
- Burlsworth Trophy (2013); 2× First-team All-Big Ten (2012, 2013)

Career NFL statistics
- Receptions: 13
- Receiving yards: 163
- Stats at Pro Football Reference

Jared Ryan Abbrederis (born December 17, 1990) is an American former professional football player who was a wide receiver in the National Football League (NFL). He played college football for the Wisconsin Badgers and was selected by the Green Bay Packers in the fifth round of the 2014 NFL draft. He was also a member of the Detroit Lions.

== Early life ==
Abbrederis attended Wautoma High School in Wautoma, Wisconsin, and was a three-time letterwinner in football. He was a second-team all-conference quarterback as a sophomore. He was again named a second-team all-conference honors as a quarterback and first-team all-conference as a defensive back in his junior year. As a senior, he was a first-team all-conference quarterback and defensive back, conference offensive player of the year, and Wisconsin Football Coaches Association first-team all-state quarterback. He finished his career with 3,014 passing yards.

He also competed in track and wrestling. He was a two-time state champion and state record holder in the 110m hurdles (14.33s) and state champion as a senior in the 300m hurdles (37.91s). His track team won the state championship in 2009. He was named Gatorade track athlete of the year and BFS Male National Athlete of the Year as a senior. At the 2009 SCC Quadrangular, he won the 100 meters event, recording a career-best time of 10.84 seconds. He also ran the 400 meters in 49.64 seconds.

== College career ==
=== 2009 and 2010 seasons ===
At the University of Wisconsin–Madison, Abbrederis joined the Wisconsin Badgers football team as a walk-on spread quarterback on the scout team in 2009.

In 2010, Abbrederis earned his first letter while playing in all 13 games and starting two games. He finished the season tied for second on the team in touchdown receptions (3), fourth in receiving yards (289), and fifth in receptions (20). He had a personal best 79 receiving yards, including a career-long 74-yard touchdown catch, on two receptions and returned one kickoff for 52 yards against Indiana on November 13, 2010. After the season, Abbrederis was named to Rivals.com's Freshman All-Big Ten Team.

=== 2011 season ===
Abbrederis earned his second letter, starting all 14 games at wide receiver. He finished the season ranked third in the country with an average of 15.8 yards per punt return, second-best in a single season in Wisconsin history (minimum 15 returns). He led the team with 933 receiving yards, the fifth-most in school history and most by a sophomore. His eight receiving touchdowns were second on the team and tied for the fifth-most in one season at Wisconsin. His 55 receptions ranked second on the team and seventh-most in school history. He finished second in the Big Ten and 13th nationally with 1,999 all-purpose yards.

He recorded a 60-yard punt return touchdown against Indiana on October 15, 2011. On October 22, 2011, in a 37–31 loss to Michigan State, Abbrederis played as the third safety on the final play of the game to defend a Hail Mary pass by Michigan State's Kirk Cousins. However, with the game tied and no time left, Abbrederis mistimed his jump on the pass defense, and the ball deflected off another player before landing into the hands of Michigan State's Keith Nichol for a touchdown. The game officials initially ruled Nichol's catch short of the end zone but ruled Nichol's catch a touchdown after reviewing a replay. His 348 all-purpose yards in the Rose Bowl vs. Oregon was a Rose Bowl record until Stanford's Christian McCaffrey broke his record in the 2016 Rose Bowl.

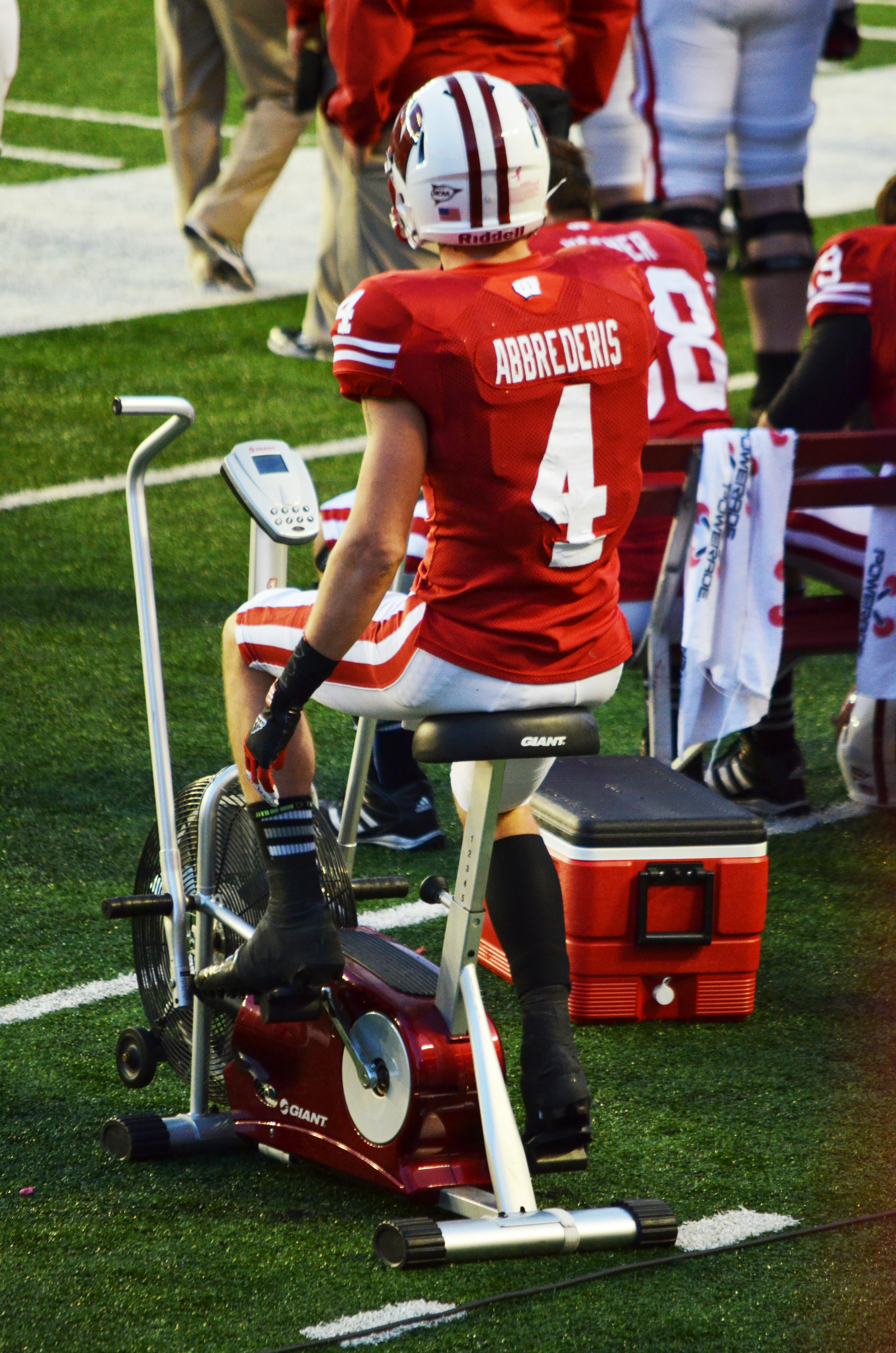
Abbrederis riding a stationary bike on the sideline during a game against Ohio State in 2012

Following the 2011 season, Abbrederis was named an honorable mention All-American punt returner by SI.com. In January 2012, Abbrederis earned an athletic scholarship from the university.

=== 2012 and 2013 seasons ===
Abbrederis scored two touchdowns on September 1, 2012, against Northern Iowa. He had a career-high 147 receiving yards on September 22, 2012, against UTEP. Following the season, Abbrederis was named consensus first-team All-Big Ten.

In 2013, Abbrederis was named to the preseason watch lists for the Fred Biletnikoff Award, Paul Hornung Award, and first-team All-Big Ten by Athlon Sports, Phil Steele and Sporting News. He recorded two catches for 122 yards and two touchdowns on August 31, 2013, against UMass. He caught eight passes for 62 yards and a touchdown against Tennessee Tech on September 7, 2013. During a Wisconsin vs. Ohio State game he caught 10 passes for 207 yards against future 2014 NFL 1st-round draft pick, cornerback Bradley Roby. On November 26, 2013, it was announced that Abbrederis was one of three finalists for the Burlsworth Trophy, which recognizes student-athletes who began their college football career as a walk-on. He was named the Burlsworth Trophy winner on December 9, 2013. He finished his collegiate career tied for the Badgers' all-time receptions record.

After the end of the 2013 season, Abbrederis was invited to and trained for the 2014 Senior Bowl. However, he injured his hamstring in practice and was pulled out of the game.

=== Records ===
Wisconsin Badgers records

- Most receptions, career: 202 (2009–13) (tied with Brandon Williams, (2002–05))
- Highest average per kickoff return, career (min 30 ret.): 25.8, (2010–13)
- Most receptions, season: 78, (2013)
- Most kickoff return yards, game: 201, (January 2, 2012 vs. Oregon)

== Professional career ==
External videos
- Abbrederis's NFL Combine workout

Pre-draft measurables
Height	Weight	Arm length	Hand span	40-yard dash	10-yard split	20-yard split	20-yard shuttle	Three-cone drill	Vertical jump	Broad jump	Bench press	Wonderlic
6 ft 1 in (1.85 m)	195 lb (88 kg)	31 3/8 in (0.80 m)	9 5/8 in (0.24 m)	4.50 s	1.62 s	2.65 s	4.08 s	6.80 s	30.5 in (0.77 m)	9 ft 9 in (2.97 m)	4 reps	32
All values are from NFL Combine

=== Green Bay Packers ===
Abbrederis was selected in the fifth round (176th overall) by the Green Bay Packers in the 2014 NFL draft. He became the first Badgers player drafted by the Packers since offensive lineman Bill Ferrario was selected in the fourth round in 2001. After being drafted by the Packers, Abbrederis stated, "Just being a walk-on at Wisconsin and then being able to have my dream to play in the NFL on the Packers, which is my team growing up. That's who I rooted for, so I'm excited." He was also the first Badgers player drafted by Packers general manager, Ted Thompson. Regarding the pick, Packers head coach Mike McCarthy said, "It's nice to come up here and say, 'about time we finally drafted one," and "There's been a number (of Badgers players) over the years we felt we were going to draft. It's great.".

Four days after being selected by the Packers in the draft, Abbrederis signed a four-year contract worth $2.364 million deal, including $144,560 signing bonus.

In August, Abbrederis tore the anterior cruciate ligament (ACL) in his right leg, requiring surgery; this injury sidelined him for the entire 2014 season.

During the Packers' first practice of 2015 training camp, Abbrederis suffered a concussion. He returned to practice before the last preseason game against the New Orleans Saints. Against the Saints, Abbrederis caught one pass for six yards on 62 offensive snaps. On September 5, 2015, he was released by the Packers during final team cuts. Abbrederis was signed to the Packers' practice squad two days later. On October 3, 2015, he was promoted from the practice squad to the active roster. He recorded his first NFL reception, a 15-yard catch on third-and-one against the Detroit Lions in Week 10. He finished the game with four receptions for 57 yards before suffering a rib injury on a 32-yard catch in the fourth quarter. Coach Mike McCarthy announced that Abbrederis would miss "several weeks" with the injury. He was out the next two weeks until making his return against the Lions in Week 13. He recorded one reception for 16 yards.

Abbrederis caught his first pass of the 2016 season in Week 1, an eight-yard reception against the Jacksonville Jaguars. On October 24, 2016, he was placed on injured reserve. Abbrederis was waived by the Packers after reaching an injury settlement on October 27, 2016.

=== Detroit Lions ===
On January 9, 2017, Abbrederis signed a reserve/future contract with the Detroit Lions. Abbrederis played in 7 games for the Lions in 2017, recording 3 receptions before being waived on November 14.

On January 5, 2018, Abbrederis announced his retirement from the NFL.

== Career statistics ==
=== NFL ===
==== Regular season ====
Year	Team	Games		Receiving					Fumbles	
Year	Team	GP	GS	Rec	Yds	Avg	Lng	TD	Fum	Lost
2015	GB	10	0	9	111	12.3	32	0	1	0
2016	GB	5	0	1	8	8.0	8	0	0	0
2017	DET	7	0	3	44	14.7	25	0	0	0
Career		22	0	13	163	12.5	32	0	1	0

==== Postseason ====
Year	Team	Games		Receiving					Fumbles	
Year	Team	GP	GS	Rec	Yds	Avg	Lng	TD	Fum	Lost
2015	GB	2	1	6	69	11.5	18	0	0	0
Total		2	1	6	69	11.5	18	0	0	0

=== College ===
Season	Team	Games		Receiving					Rushing					Kick return					Punt return				
Season	Team	GP	GS	Rec	Yds	Avg	Lng	TD	Att	Yds	Avg	Lng	TD	Ret	Yds	Avg	Lng	TD	Ret	Yds	Avg	Lng	TD
2010	Wisconsin	13	2	20	289	14.4	74	3	3	27	9.0	17	0	3	111	37.0	52	0	7	67	9.6	25	0
2011	Wisconsin	14	14	55	933	17.0	51	8	11	62	5.6	21	0	28	689	24.6	60	0	20	315	15.8	60	1
2012	Wisconsin	13	12	49	837	17.1	60	5	8	83	10.4	24	0	0	0	0.0	0	0	17	111	6.5	34	0
2013	Wisconsin	13	11	78	1,081	13.9	65	7	6	119	19.8	49	2	0	0	0.0	0	0	11	94	8.5	21	0
Career		53	39	202	3,140	15.5	74	23	28	291	10.4	49	2	31	800	25.8	60	0	55	587	10.7	60	1

== Personal life ==
Abbrederis met his future wife, Rachel Otto, at a Bible study class in September 2010. They were married on May 26, 2012. Together they have four children.

His hobbies include hunting, fishing, lifting weights and relaxing with friends.
