= Bradie Ewing =

American football player (born 1989)

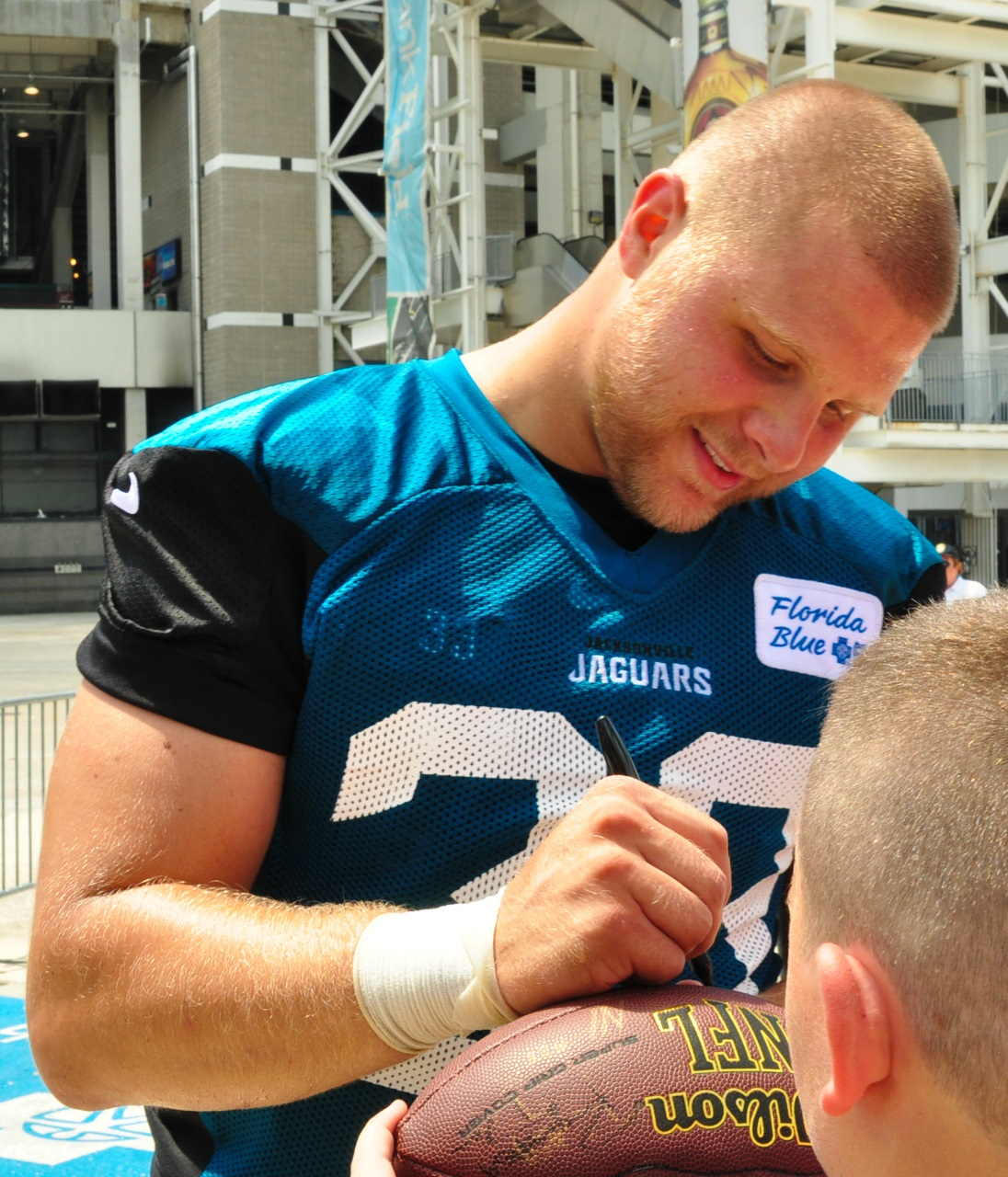
- Ewing at 2014 Jaguars training camp

No. 33,34
- Position: Fullback

Personal information
- Born: December 26, 1989 (age 36); Richland Center, Wisconsin, U.S.
- Listed height: 6 ft 0 in (1.83 m)
- Listed weight: 245 lb (111 kg)

Career information
- High school: Richland Center
- College: Wisconsin
- NFL draft: 2012: 5th round, 157th overall pick

Career history
- Atlanta Falcons (2012–2013); Jacksonville Jaguars (2014)

Career NFL statistics
- Receptions: 2
- Receiving yards: 29
- Stats at Pro Football Reference

Bradie Ewing (born December 26, 1989) is an American former professional football player who was a fullback in the National Football League (NFL). He played college football for the Wisconsin Badgers. He was selected by the Atlanta Falcons in the fifth round of the 2012 NFL draft.

== Early life ==
Ewing was born in Richland Center, Wisconsin. At Richland Center High School, he was a three-sport athlete playing football, basketball, and track and field. In football, Bradie was rated number 16 best player in the state of Wisconsin by Rivals.com and Wisconsin Preps, and was coached by Shaun Tjossem. Ewing's career numbers were 3,911 yards on 509 carries with 41 touchdowns. His senior year Ewing totaled 2,116 rushing yards on 258 carries with 24 touchdowns.

College recruiting
Name	Hometown	School	Height	Weight	40^{‡}	Commit date
Bradie Ewing; RB	Richland Center, Wisconsin	Richland Center HS	6 ft 1 in (1.85 m)	211 lb (96 kg)	4.5	Jul 7, 2008
Bradie Ewing; RB	Recruit ratings: Scout: Rivals:					
Overall recruit ranking: Scout: 26 (school recruiting) Rivals: 41 (school recruiting)
‡ Refers to 40-yard dash; Note: In many cases, Scout, Rivals, 247Sports, On3, and ESPN may conflict in their listings of height, weight and 40 time.; In these cases, the average was taken. ESPN grades are on a 100-point scale.; Sources: "2008 Wisconsin Football Commitment List". Rivals.; "2008 Wisconsin College Football Team Recruiting Prospects". Scout.; "Scout.com Team Recruiting Rankings". Scout.; "2008 Team Ranking". Rivals.com.

== College career ==
Ewing lettered all four years at the University of Wisconsin–Madison. He started out as mainly a special teams player his first two years and then became the starting fullback by his junior season while continuing to be very productive on special teams. His sophomore year, he was named Academic All-Big Ten. Junior year, he was named ESPN Academic All-District and Academic All-Big Ten. His senior year, Ewing was again named Academic All-Big Ten and was named the teams Special Teams Player of the Year. Ewing also played in the 2012 Senior Bowl.

== Professional career ==
=== Pre-draft ===
Ewing took part in the NFL Combine at Lucas Oil Stadium in Indianapolis.

Pre-draft measurables
Height	Weight	Arm length	Hand span	40-yard dash	10-yard split	20-yard split	20-yard shuttle	Three-cone drill	Vertical jump	Broad jump	Bench press
6 ft 0 in (1.83 m)	239 lb (108 kg)	31 3/8	10 3/8	4.76 s	1.61 s	2.70 s	4.16 s	7.14 s	36.5 in (0.93 m)	10 ft 0 in (3.05 m)	14 reps
All values are from the NFL Scouting Combine.

=== Atlanta Falcons ===
Ewing was selected by the Atlanta Falcons in the fifth round (157th pick overall) in the 2012 NFL draft. He was placed on injured reserve on August 11, 2012 after tearing his ACL. He played in his first NFL game on September 8, 2013, in a loss to the New Orleans Saints, where he recorded one catch for 15 yards. The following week vs. the St. Louis Rams, Ewing separated his shoulder in the first quarter of play. Before going down, he recorded one catch for 14 yards. He was again placed on injured reserve on September 16, 2013. Ewing was waived on March 21, 2014.

=== Jacksonville Jaguars ===
On March 25, 2014, Ewing was claimed off waivers by the Jacksonville Jaguars. He was placed on injured reserved on August 18, 2014. He announced his retirement from the league on April 4, 2015.
