= Peter Konz =

American football player (born 1989)

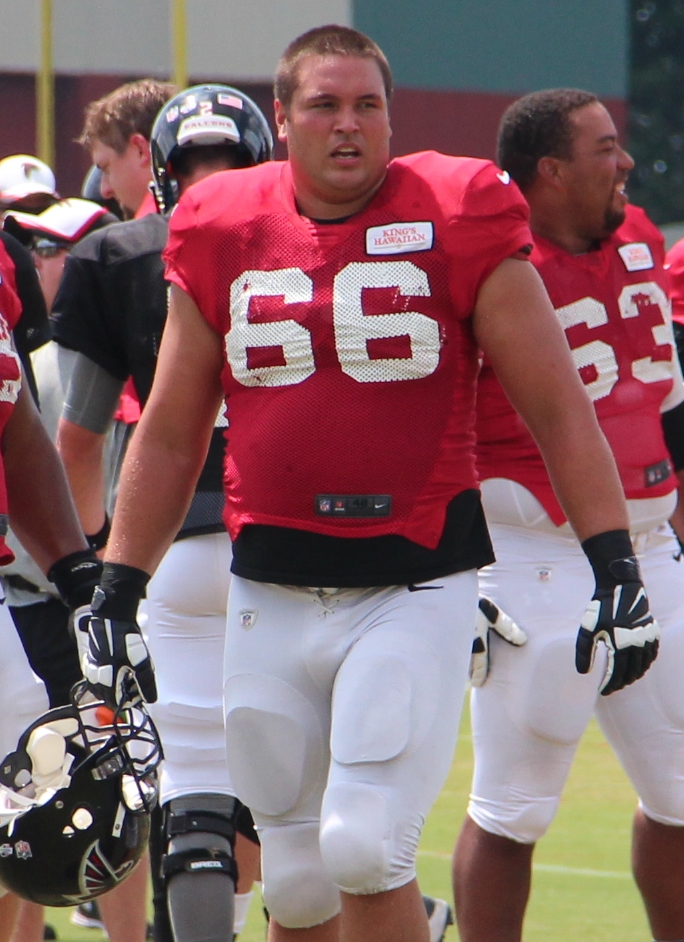
- Konz with the Atlanta Falcons in 2014

No. 66
- Position: Guard

Personal information
- Born: June 9, 1989 (age 37); Oshkosh, Wisconsin, U.S.
- Listed height: 6 ft 5 in (1.96 m)
- Listed weight: 317 lb (144 kg)

Career information
- High school: Neenah (Neenah, Wisconsin)
- College: Wisconsin (2008–2011)
- NFL draft: 2012: 2nd round, 55th overall pick

Career history
- Atlanta Falcons (2012–2014)

Awards and highlights
- First-team All-American (2011); First-team All-Big Ten (2011)

Career NFL statistics
- Games played: 39
- Games started: 28
- Stats at Pro Football Reference

Peter Konz (born June 9, 1989) is an American former professional football player who was a guard in the National Football League (NFL). He played college football for the Wisconsin Badgers and was selected by the Atlanta Falcons in the second round of the 2012 NFL draft.

== Early life ==
Konz attended Neenah High School in Neenah, Wisconsin. He played on both the offensive line and defensive line for the football team. Regarded as a four-star recruit by Rivals.com, Konz was ranked as the No. 30 offensive line prospect in the nation.

== College career ==
After being redshirted in 2008, Konz started nine of ten games in 2009. Sporting News named him a freshman All-American. As a sophomore in 2010, he started 11 of 13 games and was an honorable mention All-Big Ten.

On December 5, 2011, Konz was named All-American by AFCA. Konz is joined as an AFCA All-American by teammates Montee Ball and Kevin Zeitler. Konz was also named to the CBS All-American Team joined again by teammate Montee Ball.

On December 8, 2011, Konz was named Second Team All-American by Yahoo Sports. Konz's teammate Kevin Zeitler joined him on the Second Team while Montee Ball was named to the First Team and quarterback Russell Wilson and linebacker Chris Borland were named to the Third Team.

== Professional career ==
Konz took part in the NFL Combine at Lucas Oil Stadium in Indianapolis. He was regarded as the top center available in the 2012 NFL draft. Sports Illustrated described Konz as a "tough, nasty center with an all-around game," who "comes with a lot of upside."

Pre-draft measurables
| Height | Weight | Arm length | Hand span | Wingspan | Bench press |
|---|---|---|---|---|---|
| 6 ft 5 in (1.96 m) | 314 lb (142 kg) | 33 in (0.84 m) | 9 1/4 in (0.23 m) | 6 ft 7 1/4 in (2.01 m) | 18 reps |
All values from NFL Combine

Konz was selected by the Atlanta Falcons in the second round (55th pick overall) of the 2012 NFL Draft. In the first six games of the season, he served as backup to Garrett Reynolds, before replacing him by week 7. Then later at the start of 2013 season, he moved to center replacing Todd McClure after his retirement. On September 1, 2015, he was released by the Falcons.

== Post-football career ==
Konz initially attended Marquette University Law school. After one year at Marquette, Konz transferred to, and later graduated from, The University of Wisconsin Law School. He is now a lawyer.
