= Shelton Johnson (American football) =

American football player (born 1990)

No. 42
- Position: Safety

Personal information
- Born: July 16, 1990 (age 36); Carrollton, Texas, U.S.
- Listed height: 6 ft 0 in (1.83 m)
- Listed weight: 197 lb (89 kg)

Career information
- College: Wisconsin
- NFL draft: 2013: undrafted

Career history
- Oakland Raiders (2013); Tampa Bay Buccaneers (2014–2015)*
- * Offseason or practice squad member only

Career NFL statistics
- Total tackles: 4
- Fumble recoveries: 1
- Stats at Pro Football Reference

Shelton Johnson (born July 16, 1990) is an American former professional football player who was a safety in the National Football League (NFL). He was signed by the Oakland Raiders as an undrafted free agent in 2013. He played college football for the Wisconsin Badgers.

== At a glance ==
Appeared in four games in 2013, posting two tackles. Originally signed as an undrafted free agent and earned a spot on the team’s practice squad. Played four years at Wisconsin, and was a two-year starter at safety. 2013: Earned practice squad spot as an undrafted rookie...On the practice squad for 12 weeks prior to being promoted to the active roster on Dec. 7...Played in four games, recording three special teams tackles and recovering one fumble...(12/8) at NYJ: Made NFL debut, posting two special teams tackles...Combined on a stop with CB Taiwan Jones on kickoff coverage in the third quarter...Added another tackle on kickoff duty in the fourth quarter...(12/15) vs. KC: Saw first action on defense and played extensively on special teams...(12/22) at SD: Contributed on defense and special teams...Emerged from a pile with the ball following a muffed punt in the second quarter to set up a Raiders field goal...Added a special teams tackle, downing PR Keenan Allen on punt coverage...(12/29) vs. Den.: Played on defense and special teams...Recorded first career tackles on defense, posting two stops (one solo).

== College ==
A two-year starter at University of Wisconsin...Saw action in 46 career games with 23 starts...Three-time academic All- Big Ten…Started 10 games as a senior in 2012, recording 56 total tackles (30 solo) and four passes defensed…Earned Big-Ten Sportsmanship award in 2012…As a junior, totaled 54 tackles, six tackles for loss and four interceptions to go with eight passes defensed…As a sophomore, played in all 13 games, recording 15 tackles…As a freshman, played in nine games but recorded no defensive statistics, playing mostly on special teams.

== Personal ==
Attended Hebron High School in Carrollton, Texas…Garnered first-team all-district honors as a senior and second-team all-district honors as a junior…Helped team to Class 4A Division II state title as a sophomore...Also lettered in track and field.
