= Jake Byrne =

American football player (born 1990)

No. 89, 81
- Position: Tight end

Personal information
- Born: January 24, 1990 (age 36); Rogers, Arkansas, U.S.
- Listed height: 6 ft 4 in (1.93 m)
- Listed weight: 260 lb (118 kg)

Career information
- High school: Rogers (AR)
- College: Wisconsin
- NFL draft: 2012: undrafted

Career history
- New Orleans Saints (2012)*; Houston Texans (2012–2013)*; San Diego Chargers (2013)*; Houston Texans (2013); Kansas City Chiefs (2013)*; San Diego Chargers (2013)
- * Offseason or practice squad member only
- Stats at Pro Football Reference

Jake Byrne (born January 24, 1990) is an American former professional football tight end. He played college football at University of Wisconsin-Madison.

== NFL career ==
=== New Orleans Saints ===
After going undrafted during the 2012 NFL draft, Byrne was signed by the New Orleans Saints as an undrafted free agent on April 29, 2012. He was released on August 27, 2012 during final cuts.

=== Houston Texans ===
On January 8, 2013, Byrne was signed to the Houston Texans' practice squad. He was released by the Texans on September 1, 2013.

=== San Diego Chargers ===
On September 2, 2013, Byrne was signed to the San Diego Chargers' practice squad.

=== Second stint with the Texans ===
On October 9, 2013, Byrne was signed of the Chargers' practice squad by the Texans. Byrne appeared in 7 games, before being released on December 14, 2013.

=== Kansas City Chiefs ===
On December 18, 2013, Byrne was signed to the Kansas City Chiefs' practice squad.

=== Second stint with the Chargers ===
On December 23, 2013, Byrne was signed off the Chiefs' practice squad by the Chargers. The Chargers released Byrne on August 25, 2014.
