= Brad Nortman =

American football player (born 1989)

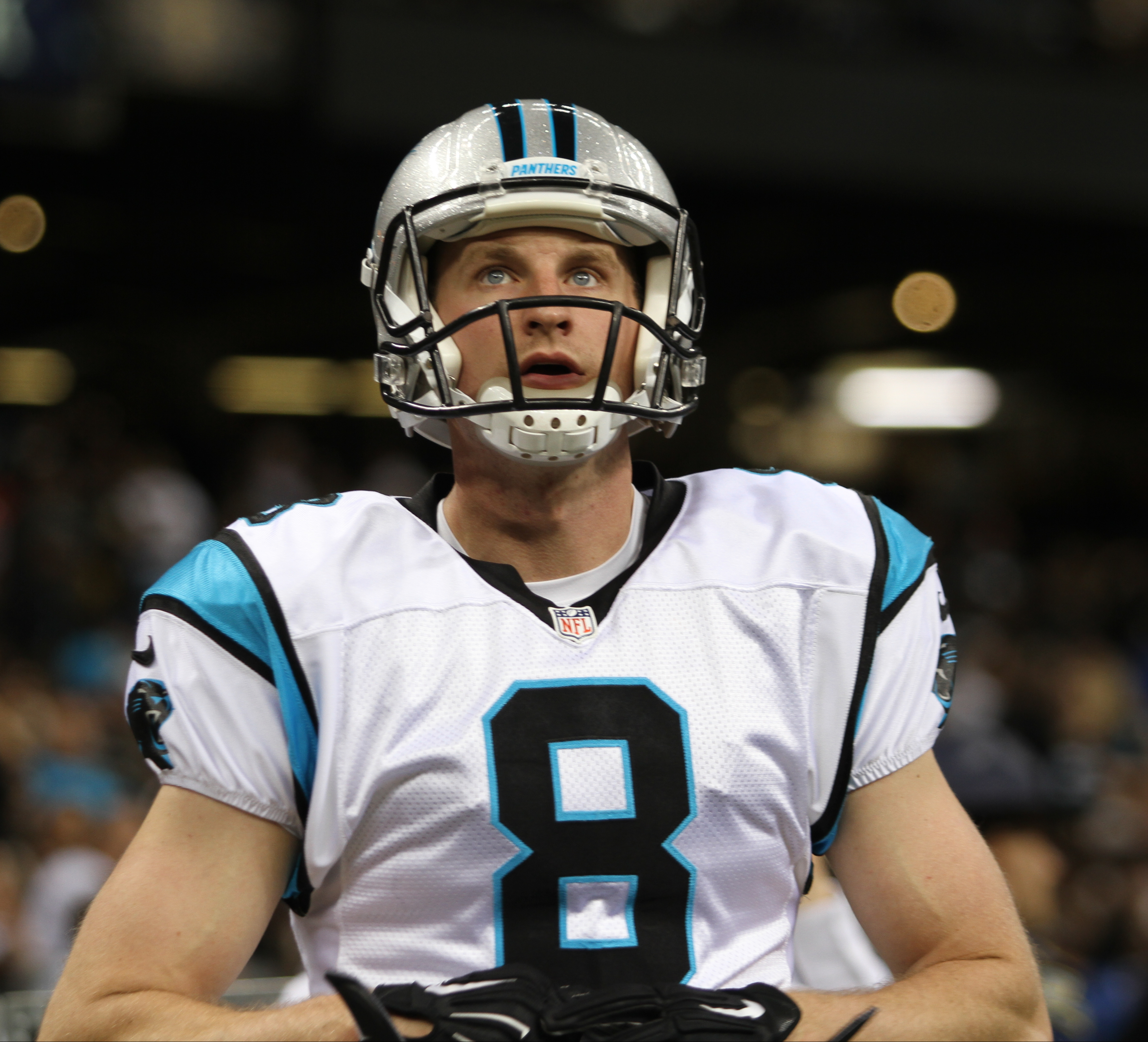
- Nortman with the Carolina Panthers in 2015

No. 8, 3
- Position: Punter

Personal information
- Born: September 12, 1989 (age 37); Brookfield, Wisconsin, U.S.
- Listed height: 6 ft 2 in (1.88 m)
- Listed weight: 212 lb (96 kg)

Career information
- High school: Brookfield Central
- College: Wisconsin (2008–2011)
- NFL draft: 2012: 6th round, 207th overall pick

Career history
- Carolina Panthers (2012–2015); Jacksonville Jaguars (2016–2017)

Career NFL statistics
- Punts: 452
- Punt yards: 20,446
- Punt average: 45.2
- Inside 20: 147
- Stats at Pro Football Reference

Brad Nortman (born September 12, 1989) is an American former professional football player who was a punter in the National Football League (NFL). He played college football for the Wisconsin Badgers. He was selected by the Carolina Panthers in the sixth round of the 2012 NFL draft, making him the first punter that the team had drafted in its history.

== Early life ==
Nortman was born and raised in Brookfield, Wisconsin. Nortman attended Brookfield Central High School in Brookfield, Wisconsin. Nortman was ranked as the No. 4 punter in the nation by Rivals.com and No. 8 by Scout.com. He was rated as the fourth-best player in the state of Wisconsin by Scout.com for the 2008 recruiting class. Following his senior season, Nortman was named first-team all-state as a punter, first-team all Greater Metro Conference as a linebacker as well as Greater Metro Conference co-defensive back of the year. He also played tight end garnering honorable mention Greater Metro Conference honors during his senior year. On February 13th, 2026, Nortman was announced as the first inductee into Brookfield Central's Athletic Hall of Fame for 2026.

== College career ==
Nortman attended the University of Wisconsin from 2008–2011. In the 2008 season, he finished with 66 punts for 2,781 net yards for a 41.8 average. In the 2009 season, he finished with 49 punts for 2,056 net yards for a 42.0 average. After his sophomore season in 2009, Nortman was named honorable mention All-Big Ten (coaches), ESPN the Magazine Academic All-District and Academic All-Big Ten. In the 2010 season, he finished with 38 punts for 1,623 net yards for a 42.7 average. Following his junior season in 2010, Nortman was named academic All-Big Ten. In the 2011 season, he finished with 46 punts for 1,943 net yards for a 42.2 average. Following the 2011 season, Nortman was named consensus honorable mention All-Big Ten, Academic All-Big Ten and participated in the 2012 Senior Bowl. Nortman ranks third in Wisconsin history with a career punting average of 42.1 yards per punt. He is fourth in school history with 8,383 career punting yards and fifth with 199 career punts.

== Professional career ==
=== Carolina Panthers ===
Nortman was selected by the Carolina Panthers in the sixth round, with the 207th overall pick, of the 2012 NFL draft. In his rookie season, he finished with 76 punts for 3,267 net yards for a 43.0 average. Nortman set Carolina franchise records for gross punting average and net yards during the 2013 season and was named NFC Special Teams Player of the Month for December 2013. In 2013, Nortman led the NFL in gross yards per punt and air yards per punt in open field punts, averaging 52.6 yards per punt and 51.9 yards per punt, respectively. He finished 3rd in the NFL with 4.6 seconds of hang time per punt. Nortman also set a new franchise record for average distance per punt in a season. In the 2013 season, he finished with 70 punts for 3,344 net yards. In the 2014 season, he finished with 72 punts for 3,236 net yards for a 44.9 average. In the 2015 season, he finished with 70 punts for 3,175 net yards for a 45.4 average. On February 7, 2016, Nortman was part of the Panthers team that played in Super Bowl 50. In the game, the Panthers fell to the Denver Broncos by a score of 24–10.

As of 2017's NFL off-season, Nortman held at least seven Panthers franchise records, including:

- Punts: playoffs (25), playoff game (7 on February 7, 2016, in Super Bowl 50 against the Denver Broncos)
- Punt Yards: game (451 on November 11, 2012, against the Denver Broncos), playoffs (1,012), playoff game (315 on February 7, 2016, in Super Bowl 50 against the Denver Broncos)
- Yards / Punt: season (47.77 in 2013), game (56.71 on November 24, 2013, against the Miami Dolphins)

=== Jacksonville Jaguars ===
Nortman signed a four-year, $8.8 million contract with the Jacksonville Jaguars on March 9, 2016.

In Week 4 of the 2016 season, against the Indianapolis Colts, he booted a career-high 78-yard punt. Nortman's 78-yarder tied Johnny Hekker for the longest punt of the 2016 season. Overall, in the 2016 season, Nortman finished with 77 punts for 3,589 net yards for a 46.6 average. In Week 13 of the 2017 season, he completed a 29-yard pass in the game against the Indianapolis Colts. Overall, in the 2017 season, he finished with 87 punts for 3,835 net yards for a 44.1 average.

On April 30, 2018, Nortman was released by the Jaguars after the team drafted punter Logan Cooke in the seventh round of the 2018 NFL draft.

== NFL career statistics ==
Legend
	Led the league
**Bold**	Career high

=== Regular season ===
Year	Team	Punting									
Year	Team	GP	Punts	Yds	Net Yds	Lng	Avg	Net Avg	Blk	Ins20	TB
2012	CAR	16	76	3,267	2,809	63	43.0	36.5	1	20	7
2013	CAR	16	70	3,344	2,909	72	**47.8**	**41.6**	0	25	5
2014	CAR	16	72	3,236	2,701	72	44.9	36.5	**2**	26	5
2015	CAR	16	70	3,175	2,787	65	45.4	39.8	0	20	5
2016	JAX	16	77	3,589	3,040	**78**	46.6	39.5	0	27	8
2017	JAX	16	**87**	**3,835**	**3,427**	65	44.1	38.9	1	**29**	**9**
Career		96	452	20,446	17,673	78	45.2	38.8	4	147	39

=== Playoffs ===
Year	Team	Punting									
Year	Team	GP	Punts	Yds	Net Yds	Lng	Avg	Net Avg	Blk	Ins20	TB
2013	CAR	1	2	84	84	51	**42.0**	**42.0**	0	1	0
2014	CAR	2	8	306	277	49	38.3	34.6	0	4	0
2015	CAR	**3**	15	622	531	61	41.5	35.4	0	3	0
2017	JAX	**3**	**19**	**785**	**739**	**62**	41.3	38.9	0	**10**	0
Career		9	44	1,797	1,631	62	40.8	37.1	0	18	0
