= Jacob Pedersen =

Norwegian runner

Ole Jacob Pedersen (April 22, 1889 – March 27, 1961) was a Norwegian track and field athlete who competed in the 1912 Summer Olympics. In 1912 he was eliminated in the semi-finals of the 400 metres competition. In the 800 metres event as well as in the 1500 metres competition he was eliminated in the first round.
