= Antonio Fenelus =

American football player and coach (born 1990)

Current position
- Title: Defensive backs coach
- Team: Florida Atlantic
- Conference: AAC

Biographical details
- Born: January 15, 1990 (age 36); Boca Raton, Florida, U.S.

Playing career
- 2008–2011: Wisconsin
- 2012: Indianapolis Colts*
- 2012: Omaha Nighthawks
- 2014: Saskatchewan Roughriders*
- 2014: Arizona Rattlers
- Position: Defensive back

Coaching career (HC unless noted)
- 2015–2017: Wisconsin (GA)
- 2018–2020: East Central University (DC/DB)
- 2021–2022: LSU (DA)
- 2023: Illinois (DB)
- 2024: Virginia (DA)
- 2025–present: Florida Atlantic (DB)

Accomplishments and honors

Championships
- ArenaBowl champion (2014)

Awards
- 2× First-team All-Big Ten (2010, 2011)

Antonio Fenelus (born January 15, 1990) is an American football coach and former defensive back who is currently a defensive backs coach at Florida Atlantic. He began his professional career with the Indianapolis Colts of the National Football League (NFL), and played his college football for the Wisconsin Badgers.

== Playing career ==
Fenelus played his college football at Wisconsin under Bret Bielema being awarded first team all Big Ten twice. In 2012 he was signed as an undrafted free agent with the Indianapolis Colts but he never made the final roster. After playing out 2012 with the Omaha Night Hawks, he then had a season in the Canadian Football League with the Saskatchewan Roughriders in 2013. In 2014 he played with the Arizona Rattlers of the Arena Football League where he won the Arena Bowl.

== Coaching career ==
=== Early coaching career ===
Fenelus began his coaching career in 2015 at his alma mater working as a graduate assistant. He stayed in that position until 2017. In 2018 he served as the defensive coordinator and defensive backs coach at East Central University in Division II. In 2021 and 2022 he worked as a defensive analyst in the SEC at LSU.

=== Illinois ===
On December 30, 2022 he joined his former coach Bret Bielema at Illinois as the team’s defensive backs coach.
