= Aaron Henry (American football) =

American football player and coach (born 1988)

Current position
- Title: Co-defensive coordinator & defensive backs coach
- Team: Notre Dame
- Conference: Independent

Biographical details
- Born: November 28, 1988 (age 37); Immokalee, Florida, U.S.

Playing career
- 2007–2011: Wisconsin
- 2012: Oakland Raiders*
- Position: Safety

Coaching career (HC unless noted)
- 2014–2015: Arkansas (GA)
- 2016: Rutgers (DB)
- 2017: NC State (S)
- 2018–2019: NC State (CB)
- 2020: Vanderbilt (CB)
- 2021–2022: Illinois (DB)
- 2023–2025: Illinois (DC)
- 2026–present: Notre Dame (Co-DC/DB)

Accomplishments and honors

Awards
- First-team All-Big Ten (2011); Second-team All-Big Ten (2010)

Aaron Henry (born November 28, 1988) is an American football coach and former safety who is the co-defensive coordinator and defensive backs coach of the Notre Dame Fighting Irish. He previously served as defensive coordinator of the Illinois Fighting Illini. He played college football for the Wisconsin Badgers and played in the National Football League (NFL) for the Oakland Raiders.

== Playing career ==
=== High School ===
Henry was a multi sport athlete at Immokalee High School in Immokalee, Florida. As a wide receiver and defensive back, he helped Immokalee to the 2004 Florida state title and go undefeated in the 2006 regular season. He was an all-state football player, all-county basketball player, and state qualifier in track.

=== College ===
He committed to play safety at Wisconsin under head coach Bret Bielema. There he was a three time Academic All-Big Ten recipient along with being awarded first and second team All-Big Ten.

=== NFL ===
In 2012 he was signed as an undrafted free agent by the Oakland Raiders, however he was cut before the regular season.

== Coaching career ==
=== Arkansas ===
In 2014 Henry began his career in coaching as a defensive graduate assistant at Arkansas under his former coach at Wisconsin Bret Bielema. He stayed there until the end of the 2015 season.

=== Rutgers ===
Henry spent the 2016 season as the defensive back's coach for Rutgers under Chris Ash.

=== NC State ===
In 2017 he went to NC State as the team's safeties coach. In 2018 and 2019 he coached the team's cornerbacks.

=== Vanderbilt ===
In 2020 he was the cornerback's coach for Vanderbilt.

=== Illinois ===
In 2021 he was reunited with Bielema serving as Illinois defensive backs coach. In 2023 he was promoted to the role of defensive coordinator.
