= 2010 Wisconsin Badgers football team =

American college football season

2010 Wisconsin Badgers football

Big Ten co-champion

Rose Bowl, L 19–21 vs. TCU
- Conference: Big Ten Conference

Ranking
- Coaches: No. 8
- AP: No. 7
- Record: 11–2 (7–1 Big Ten)
- Head coach: Bret Bielema (5th season)
- Offensive coordinator: Paul Chryst (6th season)
- Offensive scheme: Pro-style
- Defensive coordinator: Dave Doeren (3rd season)
- Base defense: 4–3
- MVPs: Scott Tolzien; J. J. Watt
- Captains: Gabe Carimi; Lance Kendricks; John Moffitt; Culver St. Jean; Scott Tolzien; Jay Valai
- Home stadium: Camp Randall Stadium

2010 Big Ten Conference football standings
	Conf.			Overall
Team	W		L	W		L
No. 14 Michigan State +	7	–	1	11	–	2
No. 7 Wisconsin $+	7	–	1	11	–	2
Iowa	4	–	4	8	–	5
Illinois	4	–	4	7	–	6
Penn State	4	–	4	7	–	6
Michigan	3	–	5	7	–	6
Northwestern	3	–	5	7	–	6
Purdue	2	–	6	4	–	8
Minnesota	2	–	6	3	–	9
Indiana	1	–	7	5	–	7
No. 5 Ohio State† %	0	–	1	0	–	1
$ – BCS representative as conference champion; % – BCS at-large representative; + – Conference co-champions; † – Ohio State (12–1, 7–1) self-vacated all of their wins; Rankings from AP Poll

The 2010 Wisconsin Badgers football team was an American football team that represented the University of Wisconsin–Madison as a member of the Big Ten Conference during the 2010 NCAA Division I FBS football season. In their fifth year under head coach Bret Bielema, the Badgers compiled an 11–2 record (7–1 in conference games), finished in a three-way tie with Michigan State and Ohio State for the Big Ten championship, and outscored opponents by a total of 539 to 267. Against ranked opponents, the Badgers lost to No. 23 Michigan State and defeated No. 1 Ohio State and No. 13 Iowa. Because Wisconsin had the highest Bowl Championship Series (BCS) ranking at the end of the regular season, the Badgers earned the conference's automatic bid to the Rose Bowl, losing, 21–19, to No. 3 TCU. They were ranked No. 7 and No. 8, respectively, in the final AP and Coaches polls.

The team was led by a trio of running backs: James White (1,052 rushing yards), John Clay (1,012 rushing yards), and Montee Ball (996 rushing yards). The team's other statistical leaders included quarterback Scott Tolzien (2,459 passing yards), tight end Lance Kendricks (43 receptions for 663 yards), kicker Philip Welch (118 points scored), linebacker Blake Sorensen (66 total tackles), defensive end Aaron Henry (47 solo tackles), and defensive end J. J. Watt (21 tackles for loss, 7 sacks). Offensive tackle Gabe Carimi won the Outland Trophy (best college football interior lineman) and the Jim Parker Trophy (top collegiate offensive lineman) and was named Big Ten Offensive Lineman of the Year. Carimi was a unanimous first-team All-American, and Kendricks was a consensus first-team pick. James White was selected as the Big Ten freshman of the year.

The team played home games at Camp Randall Stadium in Madison, Wisconsin.

== Schedule ==
Date	Time	Opponent	Rank	Site	TV	Result	Attendance	Source
September 4	10:00 p.m.	at UNLV*	No. 12	Sam Boyd Stadium; Whitney, NV	Versus	W 41–21	31,107	
September 11	11:00 a.m.	San Jose State*	No. 11	Camp Randall Stadium; Madison, WI	ESPN	W 27–14	78,469	
September 18	2:30 p.m.	Arizona State*	No. 11	Camp Randall Stadium; Madison, WI	ABC/ESPN2	W 20–19	81,332	
September 25	11:00 a.m.	Austin Peay*	No. 11	Camp Randall Stadium; Madison, WI	BTN	W 70–3	77,224	
October 2	2:30 p.m.	at No. 24 Michigan State	No. 11	Spartan Stadium; East Lansing, MI	ABC/ESPN	L 24–34	73,108	
October 9	11:00 a.m.	Minnesota^{†}	No. 20	Camp Randall Stadium; Madison, WI (rivalry)	BTN	W 41–23	80,328	
October 16	6:00 p.m.	No. 1 Ohio State	No. 18	Camp Randall Stadium; Madison, WI (College GameDay)	ESPN	W 31–18	81,194	
October 23	2:30 p.m.	at No. 13 Iowa	No. 10	Kinnick Stadium; Iowa City, IA (rivalry)	ABC/ESPN	W 31–30	70,585	
November 6	11:00 a.m.	at Purdue	No. 7	Ross–Ade Stadium; West Lafayette, IN	BTN	W 34–13	45,227	
November 13	11:00 a.m.	Indiana	No. 6	Camp Randall Stadium; Madison, WI	ESPN2	W 83–20	80,477	
November 20	11:00 a.m.	at Michigan	No. 6	Michigan Stadium; Ann Arbor, MI	ESPN	W 48–28	112,276	
November 27	2:30 p.m.	Northwestern	No. 5	Camp Randall Stadium; Madison, WI	ABC/ESPN	W 70–23	80,011	
January 1, 2011	4:10 p.m.	vs. No. 3 TCU*	No. 4	Rose Bowl; Pasadena, CA (Rose Bowl, College GameDay)	ESPN	L 19–21	94,118	
*Non-conference game; ^{†}Homecoming; Rankings from AP Poll released prior to the game; All times are in Central time

== Rankings ==
Ranking movements Legend: ██ Increase in ranking ██ Decrease in ranking
	Week															
Poll	Pre	1	2	3	4	5	6	7	8	9	10	11	12	13	14	Final
AP	12	11	11	11	11	20	18	10	9	7	6	6	5	4	4	7
Coaches	12	11	11	10	9	19	16	11	9	7	5	5	5	4	4	8
Harris	Not released						16	11	9	7	5	5	5	4	4	Not released
BCS	Not released							13	10	9	7	7	7	5	5	Not released

== Game summaries ==
=== UNLV ===
No. 12 Wisconsin at UNLV

Team	1	2	3	4	Total
• No. 12 Wisconsin	14	3	24	0	41
UNLV	7	7	0	7	21

- Date: September 4
- Location: Sam Boyd Stadium
  Whitney, Nevada
- Game start: 8:00 p.m. CST
- Elapsed time: 2:49
- Game attendance: 31,107
- Game weather: Clear, 97 °F (36 °C), Wind WSW 13 mph (21 km/h)
- TV announcers (Versus): Joe Beninati (play-by-play), Kelly Stouffer (color) & Lindsay Soto (sideline)

=== San Jose State ===
San Jose State at No. 11 Wisconsin

Team	1	2	3	4	Total
San Jose State	0	0	7	7	14
• No. 11 Wisconsin	7	10	3	7	27

- Date: September 11
- Location: Camp Randall Stadium
  Madison, Wisconsin
- Game start: 11:00 a.m. CST
- Elapsed time: 3:02
- Game attendance: 78,469
- Game weather: Cloudy, 59 °F (15 °C), Wind S 7 mph (11 km/h)
- TV announcers (ESPN): Dave Pasch (play-by-play), Brian Griese (color) & Chris Spielman (color)

=== Arizona State ===
Arizona State at No. 11 Wisconsin

Team	1	2	3	4	Total
Arizona State	7	3	3	6	19
• No. 11 Wisconsin	3	10	7	0	20

- Date: September 18
- Location: Camp Randall Stadium
  Madison, Wisconsin
- Game start: 2:30 p.m. CST
- Elapsed time: 3:10
- Game attendance: 81,332
- Game weather: Partly cloudy, 59 °F (15 °C), Wind N 10 mph (16 km/h)
- TV announcers (ABC/ESPN2): Mike Patrick (play-by-play) & Craig James (color)

A blocked PAT was the difference in a crazy game in Camp Randall Stadium. Both Arizona State and Wisconsin were undefeated heading into this game, Arizona State having beaten a pair of FCS teams and Wisconsin having beaten UNLV and San Jose State. The Badgers managed to overcome a sluggish start and fended off an upset bid by the Sun Devils.

Arizona State would be marred by mistakes, committing multiple penalties on offense and defense, and Wisconsin used Arizona State's gaffes to keep themselves in the game. The Sun Devils returned a kick for a touchdown, had a very long runback on a kick to end the half (the returner was tackled inside the one-yard line as time expired), and had a punt return for a touchdown called back due to a pair of illegal blocks. Wisconsin did not commit a single turnover, and that would ultimately help to decide this game.

Wisconsin improved to 3–0 on the season, and faces FCS opponent Austin Peay next week. Arizona State, however, falls to 2–1 and will need to win 5 Pac-10 games to become bowl-eligible.

=== Austin Peay ===
Austin Peay at No. 10 Wisconsin

Team	1	2	3	4	Total
Austin Peay	0	3	0	0	3
• No. 10 Wisconsin	14	35	14	7	70

- Date: September 25
- Location: Camp Randall Stadium
  Madison, Wisconsin
- Game start: 11:00 a.m. CST
- Elapsed time: 2:53
- Game attendance: 77,224
- Game weather: Partly cloudy, 52 °F (11 °C), Wind N 8 mph (13 km/h)
- TV announcers (BTN): Matt Devlin (play-by-play), Derek Rackley (color) & Jay Wilson (sideline)

Wisconsin broke the all-time record for most points scored with 70, breaking a record from the 1962 season (the Badgers defeated New Mexico State 69–13 that season).

=== Michigan State ===
No. 9 Wisconsin at No. 24 Michigan State

Team	1	2	3	4	Total
No. 9 Wisconsin	0	10	7	7	24
• #24 Michigan State	3	17	7	7	34

- Date: October 2
- Location: Spartan Stadium
  East Lansing, Michigan
- Game start: 2:30 p.m. CST
- Elapsed time: 3:09
- Game attendance: 73,108
- Game weather: Overcast, Light rain, 59 °F (15 °C), Wind N 15 mph (24 km/h) G21
- TV announcers (ABC/ESPN): Mike Patrick (play-by-play), Craig James (color) & Quint Kessenich (sideline)

In a matchup between undefeated teams in the Big Ten, Michigan State prevailed over the ninth-ranked Badgers. Despite 3 Spartan turnovers, the Badgers were unable to come away with a road win, dropping head coach Bret Bielema to 0–2 in Spartan Stadium and 2–2 against Michigan State overall. The Spartans face their rival, the Michigan Wolverines in a crucial road contest next week, while the Badgers face longtime rival Minnesota in the battle for Paul Bunyan's Axe.

=== Minnesota ===
Minnesota at No. 20 Wisconsin

Team	1	2	3	4	Total
Minnesota	0	9	0	14	23
• No. 20 Wisconsin	14	0	14	13	41

- Date: October 9
- Location: Camp Randall Stadium
  Madison, Wisconsin
- Game start: 11:00 a.m. CST
- Elapsed time: 3:09
- Game attendance: 80,328
- Game weather: Clear, 67 °F (19 °C), Wind S 3 mph (4.8 km/h)
- TV announcers (BTN): Eric Collins (play-by-play), Chris Martin (color) & Charissa Thompson (sideline)

Wisconsin won a school-record 7th straight game over the rival Golden Gophers, dropping Tim Brewster to 0–4 against Wisconsin and improving Bret Bielema to 5–0 against Minnesota. Wisconsin did not commit a turnover for the 4th game in a row, and had two running backs with over 100 yards rushing (James White and John Clay). Minnesota has now lost 5 straight games after winning their opener against Middle Tennessee State.

=== Ohio State ===
No. 1 Ohio State at No. 16 Wisconsin

Team	1	2	3	4	Total
No. 1 Ohio State	0	3	7	8	18
• No. 16 Wisconsin	14	7	0	10	31

- Date: October 16
- Location: Camp Randall Stadium
  Madison, Wisconsin
- Game start: 6:00 p.m. CST
- Elapsed time: 2:59
- Game attendance: 81,194
- Game weather: Clear, 70°F, Wind W 8 mph (13 km/h)
- TV announcers (ESPN): Brent Musburger (play-by-play), Kirk Herbstreit (color) & Erin Andrews (sideline)

Scoring summary
1	14:48	WIS	David Gilreath 97-yard kickoff return (Philip Welch kick)	WIS 7–0
1	10:00	WIS	John Clay 14-yard run (Philip Welch kick)	WIS 14–0
2	13:15	WIS	John Clay 1-yard run (Philip Welch kick)	WIS 21–0
2	6:48	OSU	Devin Barclay 21-yard field goal	WIS 21–3
3	10:08	OSU	Dan Herron 13-yard run (Devin Barclay kick)	WIS 21–10
4	11:38	OSU	Dan Herron 1-yard run (Terrelle Pryor to Reid Fragel pass)	WIS 21–18
4	6:57	WIS	James White 12-yard run (Philip Welch kick)	WIS 28–18
4	4:14	WIS	Philip Welch 41-yard field goal	WIS 31–18

Wisconsin stunned the top-ranked Buckeyes 31–18, their first upset of a top-ranked team since a 1981 defeat of No. 1 ranked Michigan. Wisconsin Senior WR David Gilreath returned the opening kick of the game for a touchdown, RB John Clay became the first running back to go over 100 yards rushing against the Buckeyes since Joe McKnight of USC in 2008, and Wisconsin's defense harried Ohio State QB Terrelle Pryor all game long. The Badgers ran up 21 unanswered points in the first half before Devin Barclay of Ohio State answered with a field goal. The Buckeyes managed to get 15 more points (via a pair of Daniel Herron touchdown runs) but the Badgers iced their incredible upset of the Buckeyes with a TD run by James White and a Philip Welch field goal. The win over Ohio State is Bret Bielema's first; he was 0–3 against the Buckeyes in the previous three meetings (2007, 2008, and 2009). The loss dropped Jim Tressel to 4–4 against Wisconsin and snapped a three-game Buckeye winning streak over the Badgers.

=== Iowa ===
No. 11 Wisconsin at No. 12 Iowa

Team	1	2	3	4	Total
• No. 11 Wisconsin	3	7	14	7	31
No. 12 Iowa	6	7	7	10	30

- Date: October 23
- Location: Kinnick Stadium
  Iowa City, Iowa
- Game start: 2:30 p.m. CST
- Elapsed time: 3:23
- Game attendance: 70,585
- Game weather: Partly Cloudy, 67°F, Wind S 14 mph (23 km/h)
- TV announcers (ABC/ESPN): Sean McDonough (play-by-play), Matt Millen (color) & Heather Cox (sideline)

11th ranked Wisconsin won a narrow 31–30 contest over the Iowa Hawkeyes. The Hawkeyes went into the half with a 13–10 lead, but the Badgers chipped away at it and took a 24–20 lead. The Hawkeyes managed a touchdown and field goal of their own to take a 30–24 lead in the 4th quarter. However, the Badgers scored the go-ahead touchdown on an 8-yard run by running back Montee Ball. With under a minute remaining, Iowa drove into Wisconsin territory on their final possession, but Iowa RB Adam Robinson was tackled before he could get out of bounds. Unable to stop the clock, Iowa ran out of time, giving Wisconsin head coach Bret Bielema his first-ever road win over a ranked opponent. It was also his 3rd win over Iowa and 2nd in Iowa City, breaking a two-game Hawkeye winning streak.

=== Purdue ===
No. 7 Wisconsin at Purdue

Team	1	2	3	4	Total
• No. 7 Wisconsin	0	6	14	14	34
Purdue	7	3	0	3	13

- Date: November 6
- Location: Ross–Ade Stadium
  West Lafayette, Indiana
- Game start: 11:00 a.m. CST
- Elapsed time: 3:04
- Game attendance: 45,227
- Game weather: Clear, 38°F, Wind WNW 6 mph (9.7 km/h)
- TV announcers (BTN): Eric Collins (play-by-play), Chris Martin (color) & Charissa Thompson (sideline)

Wisconsin traveled to West Lafayette to play the Purdue Boilermakers. Purdue entered the game on a two-game losing streak (losing 49–0 at Ohio State and 44–10 at Illinois), but managed to take a 10–3 lead on the Badgers before the end of the first half. An interception by Badger QB Scott Tolzien on Wisconsin's first possession of the game and a missed field goal by Wisconsin K Philip Welch helped the Boilermakers take a 10–6 lead at the half.

From there, Wisconsin took command of the game. Purdue Freshman QB Sean Robinson threw an interception on the first possession of the half that set the Badgers up with excellent field position. Badger QB Scott Tolzien capitalized on the turnover, finding freshman WR Jared Abbrederis on a 7-yard touchdown strike that gave the Badgers their first lead of the game at 13–10. After an exchange of punts, the Badgers again found the end zone on a 31-yard touchdown run by RB Montee Ball, extending their lead to 20–10. Purdue K Carson Wiggs tightened the game by kicking a field goal to cut the Badger lead 20–13. However, those would be the last points of the game for the Boilermakers. Wisconsin would get another touchdown run from Ball and an interception returned for a touchdown by CB Antonio Fenelus.

The Badgers won their fifth straight game over Purdue, and their 8th game of the season overall. They play Indiana in Camp Randall on November 13. After a 2–0 start to conference play, Purdue has lost their last three games. They play Michigan in West Lafayette, having won their last two games against the Wolverines.

=== Indiana ===
Indiana at No. 5 Wisconsin

Team	1	2	3	4	Total
Indiana	7	3	3	7	20
• No. 5 Wisconsin	10	28	21	24	83

- Date: November 13
- Location: Camp Randall Stadium
  Madison, Wisconsin
- Game start: 11:00 a.m. CST
- Elapsed time: 3:04
- Game attendance: 80,477
- Game weather: Light Rain, 48°F, Wind E 8 mph (13 km/h)
- TV announcers (ESPN2): Bob Wischusen (play-by-play), Brian Griese (color) & Quint Kessenich (sideline)

Wisconsin did not punt on any of their offensive possessions, tallied a pair of 100-yard running backs (James White and Montee Ball) and overpowered the Indiana Hoosiers. At one point, the score was 10–10, but Wisconsin would score 7 consecutive touchdowns to take a 59–10 lead before Indiana managed to kick a field goal. The Badgers put in their backup players in the 4th Quarter, but their two backup quarterbacks (Jon Budmayr and Nate Tice) managed to score a pair of touchdowns anyway.

Badger QB Scott Tolzien completed 15 passes on 18 attempts with a trio of touchdown strikes. Montee Ball's 167 rushing yards and 3 rushing touchdowns on 22 carries led Wisconsin's ground game, and his teammate James White (who had not played against Purdue with a head injury) ran for 144 yards on 19 carries with two touchdowns of his own. Wisconsin S Aaron Henry returned an interception for a touchdown late in the game to put Wisconsin up by a commanding margin and icing their win over the Hoosiers.

Wisconsin's 83 points against Indiana easily broke their previous record 70 points scored against Austin Peay, which was set earlier this season. They play Michigan in Ann Arbor next week.

=== Michigan ===
No. 5 Wisconsin at Michigan

Team	1	2	3	4	Total
• No. 5 Wisconsin	7	17	7	17	48
Michigan	0	0	21	7	28

- Date: November 20
- Location: Michigan Stadium
  Ann Arbor, Michigan
- Game start: 12:00 p.m. EST
- Elapsed time: 3:03
- Game attendance: 112,276
- Game weather: Partly Cloudy, Mid 40s, Wind W 5–10 mph (8.0–16.1 km/h)
- TV announcers (ESPN): Dave Pasch (play-by-play), Bob Griese (color), Chris Spielman (color) & Quint Kessenich (sideline)

Scoring summary
1	3:15	WIS	Montee Ball 1-yard run (Philip Welch kick)	WIS 7–0
2	8:07	WIS	Philip Welch 25-yard field goal	WIS 10–0
2	3:50	WIS	Montee Ball 27-yard run (Philip Welch kick)	WIS 17–0
2	1:51	WIS	James White 61-yard run (Philip Welch kick)	WIS 24–0
3	11:03	MICH	Darryl Stonum 24-yard pass from Denard Robinson (Brendan Gibbons kick)	WIS 24–7
3	9:23	MICH	Denard Robinson 4-yard run (Brendan Gibbons kick)	WIS 24–14
3	5:31	WIS	James White 3-yard run (Philip Welch kick)	WIS 31–14
3	3:12	MICH	Denard Robinson 11-yard run (Brendan Gibbons kick)	WIS 31–21
4	14:58	WIS	Montee Ball 3-yard run (Philip Welch kick)	WIS 38–21
4	9:04	WIS	Philip Welch 40-yard field goal	WIS 41–21
4	6:07	MICH	Roy Roundtree 28-yard pass from Denard Robinson (Brendan Gibbons kick)	WIS 41–28
4	2:41	WIS	Montee Ball 4-yard run (Philip Welch kick)	WIS 48–28

Wisconsin would lead from start to finish of this game, shutting out the powerful Michigan Wolverine offense in the first half. The Badgers incredibly gained 380 yards of total offense in the first half. Wisconsin would close out the Wolverines from there; Michigan managed to cut Wisconsin's lead to just 10 points with a pair of back to back touchdowns. However, Wisconsin answered with a touchdown of its own. Michigan would score another 3rd-quarter touchdown, but the 4th quarter was where the Badgers took this game, outscoring the Wolverines 17–7 in the final 15:00.

Wisconsin running back Montee Ball ran for 4 touchdowns on 30 carries; his 194 yards paced a powerful Badger rushing attack. Badger QB Scott Tolzien completed 14 passes on 15 attempts for 201 yards as the Badgers diced up Michigan's vulnerable secondary. Wisconsin RB James White would run for 161 yards of his own and a pair of touchdowns; he and Ball combined for 6 rushing touchdowns and well over 300 yards of total offense.

Denard Robinson became the first QB to run for over 1,500 yards in a season, but he was unable to spark the Wolverines to a possible upset of a top ten Wisconsin team.

With the 48–28 win, Wisconsin won in Michigan Stadium for the first time since the 1994 season (when they defeated Michigan 31–19). Wisconsin also scored more points in the game than they had ever scored in any single game against the Wolverines prior to this date. The 10–1 Badgers are now looking at a potential Rose Bowl berth and BCS game, but must play a still-dangerous Northwestern Wildcats team in Camp Randall next weekend.

=== Northwestern ===
Northwestern at No. 5 Wisconsin

Team	1	2	3	4	Total
Northwestern	3	14	6	0	23
• No. 5 Wisconsin	14	35	21	0	70

- Date: November 27
- Location: Camp Randall Stadium
  Madison, Wisconsin
- Game start: 2:30 CST
- Elapsed time: 3:09
- Game attendance: 80,011
- Game weather: Clear, Low 32°F, Wind W 3 mph (4.8 km/h)
- TV announcers (ABC/ESPN): Dave Pasch (play-by-play), Bob Griese (color), Chris Spielman & Jeannine Edwards (sideline)

Wisconsin led by double digits just minutes into the game and never let go, blowing out the Wildcats en route to their eleventh victory of the season. Aided by 7 Northwestern turnovers, the Badgers played some of their best football of the season on Senior Day.

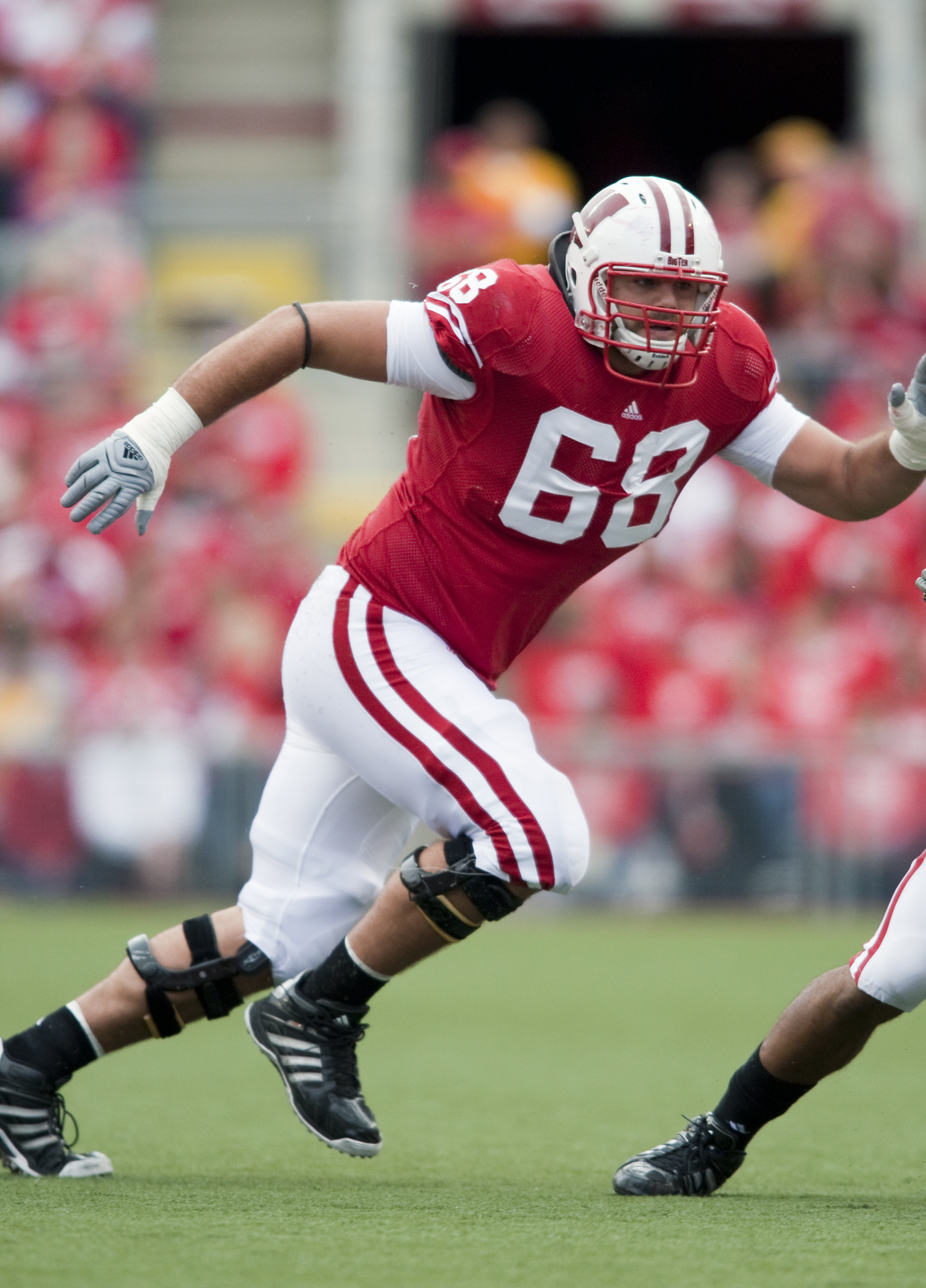
Gabe Carimi

Wisconsin QB Scott Tolzien, who led the nation in passing completion percentage (74.3%) in the regular season, had an excellent game in his final home start. He completed 15 passes on 19 attempts for 230 yards with 4 touchdown passes. Tolzien was not sacked once in the game, and left to a standing ovation.

Wisconsin's running back duo of Montee Ball and James White tore apart Northwestern's defense on the ground, with 300+ combined rushing yards. James White eclipsed the 1,000 yards rushing mark for the season. Montee Ball's 4 touchdown runs paced the Badger ground game and he ran 20 times for 178 yards on the day.

The Badger offensive line had one of its best games of the season, opening holes for the running game and protecting Scott Tolzien. Bill Nagy, John Moffitt, and Gabe Carimi put together fantastic games in their final home start. Badger TE Lance Kendricks caught 4 passes for 80 yards with an acrobatic touchdown catch, and WR David Gilreath scored his only receiving touchdown in the regular season on an 18-yard strike from Tolzien. Nick Toon caught a pair of touchdown passes as well.

Due to wins by Ohio State (over Michigan) and Michigan State (over Penn State), Wisconsin's win over Northwestern resulted in a tie between the teams with a 7–1 overall record. The Big Ten championship is thus split amongst the three teams, with the highest ranked team in the BCS going to the Rose Bowl.

=== TCU–Rose Bowl ===
Rose Bowl

Team	1	2	3	4	Total
No. 5 Wisconsin	10	3	0	6	19
• No. 3 TCU	14	0	7	0	21

- Date: January 1
- Location: Rose Bowl
  Pasadena, California
- Game start: 4:10 p.m. CST
- Elapsed time: 2:57
- Game attendance: 94,118
- Game weather: Sunny, 57°F, Wind: Calm
- TV announcers (ESPN): Brent Musburger (play-by-play), Kirk Herbstreit (color) & Erin Andrews (sideline)

Both teams scored double digit points in the first quarter, a Rose Bowl record. The game was close throughout, and was not decided until Wisconsin failed to convert a two-point conversion late in the fourth quarter to tie the game. It was the second time the game was decided by two points, joining the 1966 game (UCLA 14, Michigan State 12).

== Personnel ==
=== Coaching staff ===
Name	Position
Bret Bielema	Head coach
Paul Chryst	Offensive coordinator, quarterbacks coach
Dave Doeren	Defensive coordinator, inside linebackers coach
Del Alexander	Wide receivers coach
Chris Ash	Defensive backs coach
Bob Bostad	Offensive line coach, run game coordinator
Greg Jackson	Nickelbacks, assistant linebackers coach
Charlie Partridge	Defensive line, special teams coach
Joe Rudolph	Tight ends coach, recruiting coordinator
John Settle	Running backs coach

=== Roster ===
Quarterbacks: 10 Curt Phillips – (redshirt) Sophomore; 11 Joe Brennan – Freshman; 14 Drew McAdams – Freshman; 16 Scott Tolzien – (redshirt) Senior; Wide receivers: 1 Nick Toon – (redshirt) Junior; 3 Kyle Jefferson – Senior; 4 Jared Abbrederis – (redshirt) Freshman; 6 Isaac Anderson – (redshirt) Senior; 8 Isaiah Williams – Freshman; 15 Jeff Duckworth – (redshirt) Freshman; 17 Connor Moutvic – Freshman; 19 Manasseh Garner – Freshman; 31 Connor Cummins – Freshman; 85 David Gilreath – Senior; 87 Marquis Mason – Freshman; 89 Chase Hammond – Freshman; Offensive line: 58 Ricky Wagner – (redshirt) Sophomore; 60 Jake Current – Junior; 63 Casey Dehn – (redshirt) Freshman; 72 Travis Frederick – Sophomore; 74 John Moffitt – (redshirt) Senior; 75 Zac Matthias – (redshirt) Freshman; 76 Bill Nagy – (redshirt) Senior	Running backs: 20 James White – Freshman; 22 Jeffrey Lewis – Freshman; 28 Montee Ball – Sophomore; 30 Zach Brown – Senior; 32 John Clay – (redshirt) Junior; 34 Bradie Ewing (FB) – Junior; Tight ends: 46 Zach Davison – (redshirt) Sophomore; 49 Brian Wozniak – (redshirt) Freshman; 82 Jake Byrne – Junior; 84 Lance Kendricks – (redshirt) Senior; 86 Sherard Cadogan – Freshman	Defensive line: 11 David Gilbert – Sophomore; 45 Warren Herring – Freshman; 51 Tyler Dippel – (redshirt) Freshman; 54 Kyle Costigan – Freshman; 65 Jake Irwin – Freshman; 77 Bryce Gilbert – Freshman; 90 Anthony Mains – (redshirt) Sophomore; 92 Pat Muldoon – (redshirt) Freshman; 96 Beau Allen – Freshman; 97 Brendan Kelly – (redshirt) Sophomore; 99 J. J. Watt – (redshirt) Junior; Linebackers: 9 Blake Sorensen – Senior; 15 Culmer St. Jean – (redshirt) Senior; 17 A.J. Fenton – (redshirt) Freshman; 28 Coddye Ring-Noonan – (redshirt) Sophomore; 36 Ethan Armstrong – (redshirt) Freshman; 37 Kevin Claxton – Junior; 41 Kevin Rouse – (redshirt) Junior; 42 Cody Byers – Freshman; 44 Chris Borland – Sophomore; 50 Josh Harrison – Freshman; 52 Nick Hill – (redshirt) Freshman; 53 Mike Taylor – (redshirt) Sophomore; 59 Marcus Trotter – Freshman	Defensive backs: 2 Jay Valai – (redshirt) Senior; 3 Jameson Wright – Freshman; 7 Aaron Henry – (redshirt) Junior; 10 Devin Smith – Junior; 12 Dezmen Southward – (redshirt) Freshman; 13 Conor O'Neill – (redshirt) Freshman; 21 Peniel Jean – Freshman; 22 Darius Feaster – (redshirt) Freshman; 24 Shelton Johnson – (redshirt) Sophomore; 25 Adam Hampton – (redshirt) Junior; 26 Antonio Fenelus – Junior; 29 Niles Brinkley – (redshirt) Senior; 43 Michael Trotter – Freshman; Punters: 98 Brad Nortman – Junior; Place kickers: 18 Philip Welch – (redshirt) Junior; 94 Kyle French – Freshman; 96 Alec Lerner – (redshirt) Freshman; Long snappers: 56 James McGuire – Freshman; 57 Marcus Krien – Freshman

=== Regular starters ===
Position	Player
Quarterback	Scott Tolzien
Running back	John Clay
Wide receiver	Nick Toon
Wide receiver	David Gilreath
Tight end	Lance Kendricks
Tight end	Jake Byrne
Left Tackle	Gabe Carimi
Left Guard	John Moffitt
Center	Peter Konz
Right Guard	Kevin Zeitler
Right Tackle	Ricky Wagner
Kicker	Philip Welch

Position	Player
Defensive end	Louis Nzegwu
Defensive tackle	Patrick Butrym
Defensive tackle	Ethan Hemer/Jordan Kohout
Defensive end	J. J. Watt
Outside Linebacker	Blake Sorensen
Middle Linebacker	Culver St. Jean
Outside Linebacker	Mike Taylor
Cornerback	Niles Brinkley
Strong Safety	Jay Valai
Free Safety	Aaron Henry
Cornerback	Antonio Fenelus
Punter	Brad Nortman

== Statistics ==
The Badgers outscored opponents by a total of 539 (41.46 points per game) to 267 (20.54 points per game). They gained an average of 445.2 yards per game, consisting of 245.7 rushing yards and 199.46 passing yards. On defense, they gave up an average of 321.8 yards per game, consisting of 127.8 rushing yards and 193.92 passing yards.

Three Wisconsin players rushed for over 950 yards:

- James White tallied 1,052 yards and scored 14 touchdowns on 156 attempts for an average of 6.7 yards per carry.
- John Clay tallied 1,012 yards and 14 touchdowns on 187 carries for an average of 5.4 yards per carry.
- Montee Ball tallied 996 yards and 18 touchdowns on 163 attempts for an average of 6.1 yards per carry.

Quarterback Scott Tolzien completed 194 of 266 passes (72.9%) for 2,459 yards, 16 touchdowns, six interceptions and a 165.9 passer rating.

Five players gained over 200 receiving yards:

- Tight end Lance Kendricks caught 43 passes for 663 yards, an average of 15.4 yards per reception.
- Wide receiver Nick Toon caught 36 passes for 459 yards, an average of 12.75 yards per reception.
- Wide receiver David Gilreath caught 23 passes for 370 yards, an average of 16.1 yards per reception.
- Wide receiver Jared Abbrederis caught 20 passes for 289 yards, an average of 14.45 yards per reception.
- Isaac Anderson caught 24 passes for 233 yards, an average of 9.7 yard per reception.

Kicker Philp Welch was the team's leading scorer with 118 points on 17 field goals and 67 extra points. Montee Ball ranked second with 108 points on 18 touchdowns.

The team's defensive leaders included defensive ends J. J. Watt (21 tackles for loss, seven sacks, 10 quarterback hurries) and Aaron Henry (47 solo tackles), linebacker Blake Sorensen (66 total tackles), and defensive backs Antonio Fenelus (four interceptions) and Niles Brinkley (nine pass breakups).

== Awards and honors ==
Left tackle Gabe Carimi won the Outland Trophy (best college football interior lineman) and the Jim Parker Trophy (top collegiate offensive lineman) and was named Big Ten Offensive Lineman of the Year. He was also a unanimous first team pick on the 2010 All-America college football team.

In addition to Carimi, three other Wisconsin players received first-team All-America honors:

- Tight end Lance Kendricks was a consensus first-team pick on the All-America team, receiving first-team honors from the American Football Coaches Association, The Sporting News, Pro Football Weekly (PFW), and Sports Illustrated.
- Offensive guard John Moffitt received first-team All-America honors from the Associated Press, CBS, ESPN, and Rivals.com.
- Defensive end J. J. Watt received first-team All-America honors from PFW.

Five Wisconsin players received recognition on the 2010 All-Big Ten Conference football team: Moffitt (Coaches-1, Media-1); Carini (Coaches-1, Media-1); Kendricks (Coaches-1, Media-1); Watt (Coaches-1, Media-1); and defensive back Antonio Fenelus (Media-1).

Tailback James White was selected by both the coaches and media as the Big Ten freshman of the year.

== 2011 NFL draft ==
=== 2011 NFL draft class ===
2011 NFL draft selections
Round	Pick #	Team	Player	Position
1	11	Houston Texans	J. J. Watt	Defensive end
1	29	Chicago Bears	Gabe Carimi	Offensive tackle
2	47	St. Louis Rams	Lance Kendricks	Tight end
3	75	Seattle Seahawks	John Moffitt	Offensive guard
7	252	Dallas Cowboys	Bill Nagy	Center

=== Signed undrafted free agents ===
- DB Niles Brinkley, Pittsburgh Steelers
- RB John Clay, Pittsburgh Steelers
- WR David Gilreath, Indianapolis Colts
- LB Blake Sorensen, Seattle Seahawks
- QB Scott Tolzien, San Diego Chargers
