= James White (running back) =

American football player (born 1992)

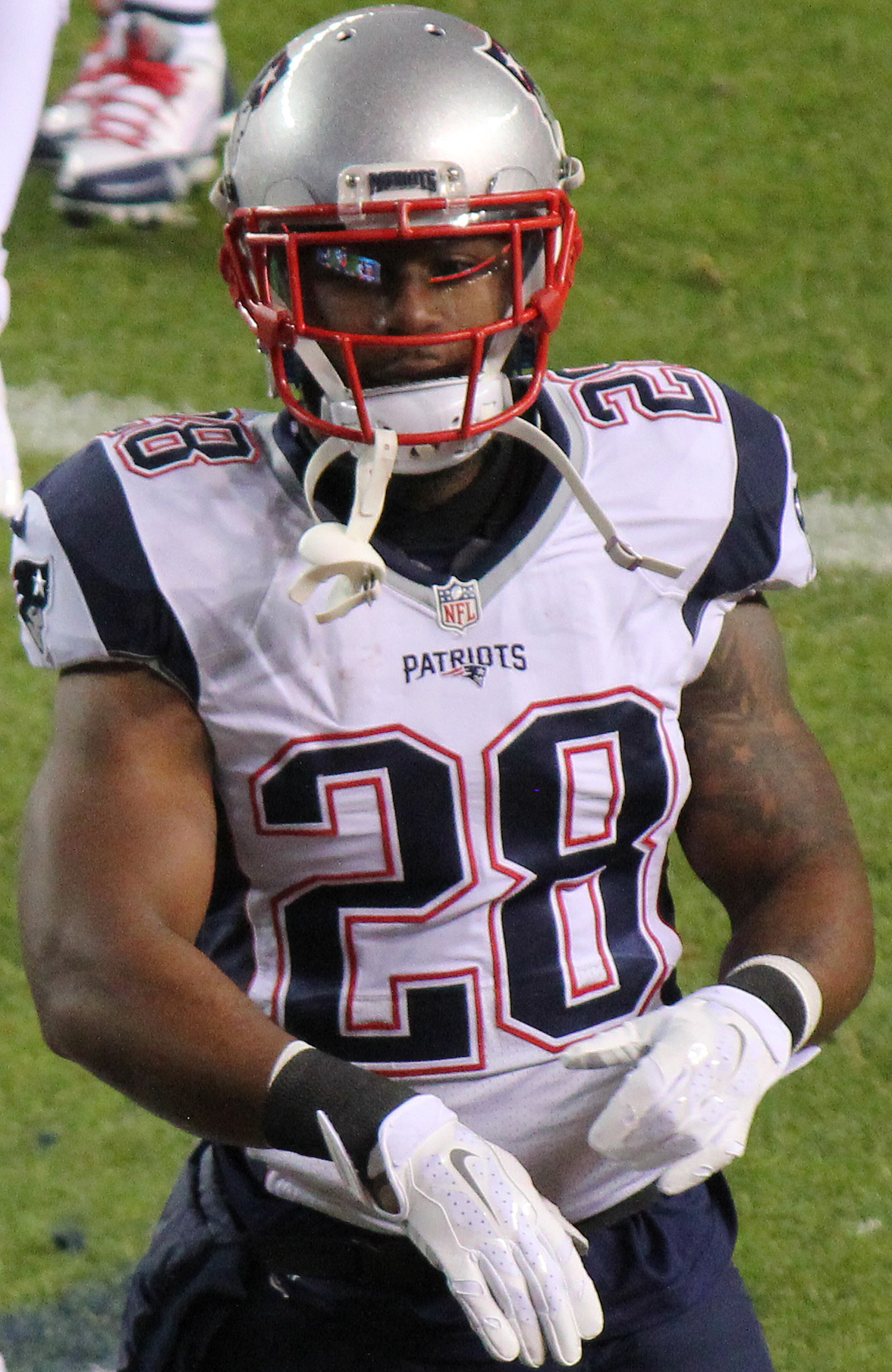
- White with the New England Patriots in 2015

Benet Academy Redwings
- Title: Head coach

Personal information
- Born: February 3, 1992 (age 34); Fort Lauderdale, Florida, U.S.
- Listed height: 5 ft 10 in (1.78 m)
- Listed weight: 205 lb (93 kg)

Career information
- Position: Running back (No. 28)
- High school: St. Thomas Aquinas (Fort Lauderdale)
- College: Wisconsin (2010–2013)
- NFL draft: 2014: 4th round, 130th overall pick

Career history

Playing
- New England Patriots (2014–2021)

Coaching
- Illinois Fighting Illini football (2025) Assistant running backs coach

Awards and highlights
- 3× Super Bowl champion (XLIX, LI, LIII); New England Patriots All-2010s Team; New England Patriots All-Dynasty Team; 2× Second-team All-Big Ten (2010, 2013); Big Ten Freshman of the Year (2010); NFL records: Most points scored in a Super Bowl by a single player: 20 (tied with Jalen Hurts)

Career NFL statistics
- Rushing yards: 1,278
- Rushing average: 4.0
- Rushing touchdowns: 11
- Receptions: 381
- Receiving yards: 3,278
- Receiving touchdowns: 25
- Stats at Pro Football Reference

James Calvin White (born February 3, 1992) is an American football coach and former running back who played in the National Football League (NFL) for eight seasons with the New England Patriots. He played college football for the Wisconsin Badgers and was selected by the Patriots in the fourth round of the 2014 NFL draft. A three-time Super Bowl champion, White set the Super Bowl records for receptions and points scored in Super Bowl LI and is also tied with Darren Sproles for the record for the most receptions (15) in a playoff game. Since retiring as a player, White has served as the head football coach at Benet Academy and the assistant running backs coach for the Illinois Fighting Illini.

== Early life ==
White attended the St. Thomas Aquinas High School in Fort Lauderdale, Florida. While there, he played high school football for the Raiders. White was a part of the 2008 St. Thomas Aquinas National Championship team. At Aquinas, he primarily split time with Giovani Bernard, who later became a running back for the Cincinnati Bengals and Tampa Bay Buccaneers. As a senior, White rushed for over 1,000 yards and over 20 touchdowns and was chosen to the (Broward) All-County team. He also played and lettered in baseball.

White came out of St. Thomas Aquinas as the 70th-ranked running back in his class, and as a three-star recruit by Scout.com. White chose Wisconsin over Clemson, Michigan State, and South Florida, among others. He was given the nickname "Sweet Feet".

== College career ==
White attended the University of Wisconsin–Madison from 2010 to 2013.

White was named the 2010 Big Ten Conference Freshman of the Year. He finished the season with 156 carries for 1,052 yards and 14 touchdowns to go along with 11 receptions for 88 yards, leading the Badgers to the 2011 Rose Bowl in Pasadena, California.

As a sophomore in 2011, White had 141 carries for 713 yards and six touchdowns to go along with 15 receptions for 150 yards.

As a junior in 2012, White finished with 125 carries for 806 yards and 12 touchdowns to go along with eight receptions for 132 yards and a touchdown.

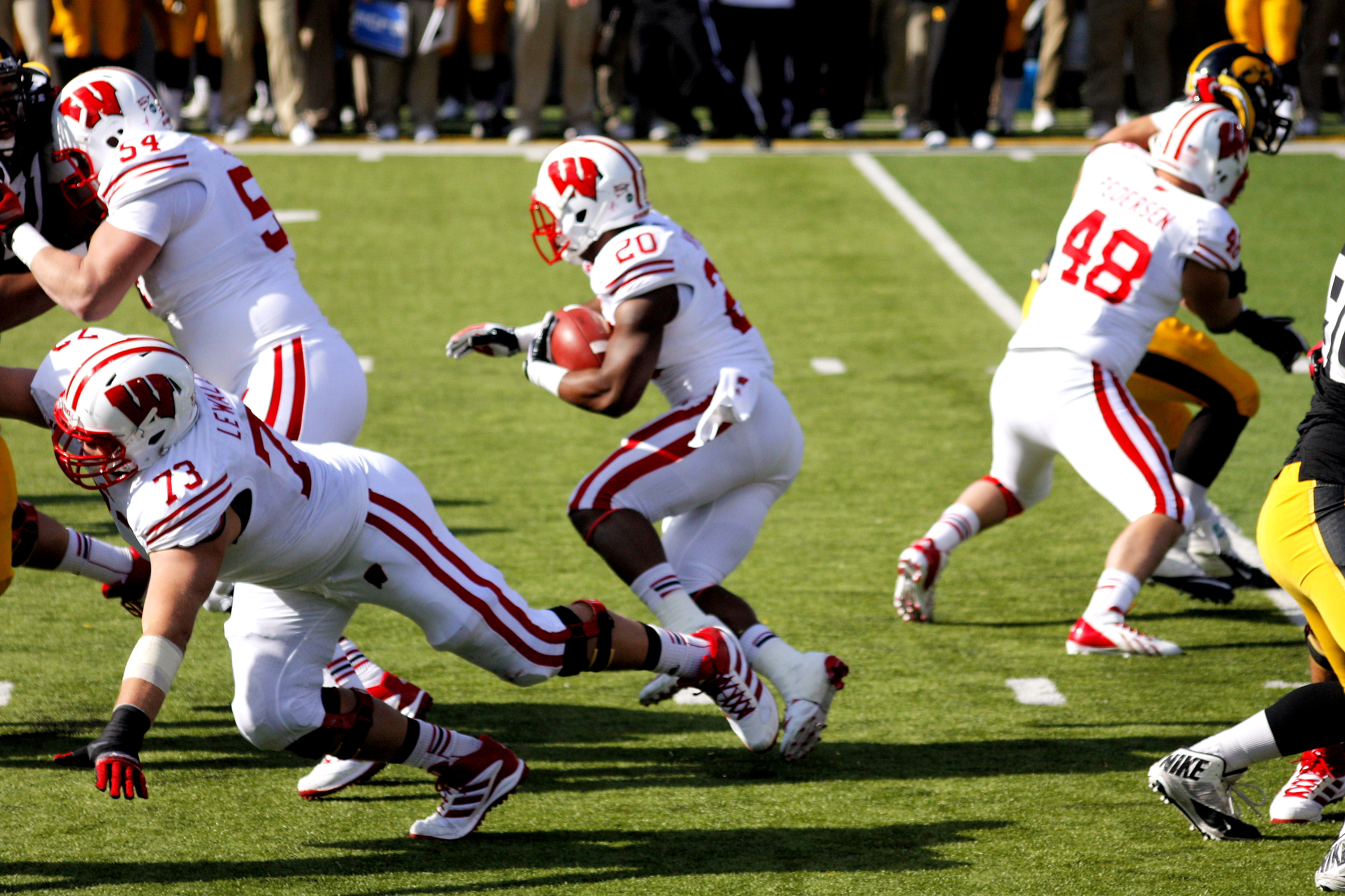
White running the ball against the rival Iowa Hawkeyes in November 2013.

On November 16, 2013, White ran for a career-high 205 yards against Indiana and set a Wisconsin record for longest run from scrimmage (93 yards). He finished his senior season with 221 carries for 1,444 yards and 13 touchdowns to go along with 39 receptions for 300 yards and two touchdowns.

White rushed for over 100 yards a game on 17 different occasions during his college career despite splitting carries with John Clay, Montee Ball, and Melvin Gordon for most of his career.

== Professional career ==
Pre-draft measurables
Height	Weight	Arm length	Hand span	Wingspan	40-yard dash	10-yard split	20-yard split	20-yard shuttle	Three-cone drill	Vertical jump	Broad jump	Bench press
5 ft 9 1/8 in (1.76 m)	204 lb (93 kg)	29 1/4 in (0.74 m)	8 1/4 in (0.21 m)	5 ft 9 5/8 in (1.77 m)	4.57 s	1.60 s	2.66 s	4.20 s	7.05 s	32.0 in (0.81 m)	9 ft 6 in (2.90 m)	23 reps
All values from NFL Combine

=== 2014 season ===
White was selected by the New England Patriots in the fourth round (130th overall) of the 2014 NFL draft. He was active for only three games for the Patriots.

During Week 4 against the Kansas City Chiefs, White made his NFL debut and finished the 41–14 loss with three carries for 21 yards and three receptions for 15 yards. White was inactive for the team's 28–24 victory over the Seattle Seahawks in Super Bowl XLIX.

=== 2015 season ===
White emerged onto the national scene during Week 11 with a two-touchdown performance (one rushing, one receiving) against the Buffalo Bills on Monday Night Football after starting running back Dion Lewis was out for the season with a torn ACL. White finished the 20–13 victory with 14 rushing yards and 32 receiving yards. The win pushed the Patriots' record to 10–0 for the season. Two weeks later against the Philadelphia Eagles, White caught a career-high 10 passes for 115 yards and a touchdown in the 35–28 loss.

White finished his second professional season with 40 receptions for 410 yards and four touchdowns to go along with 22 carries for 56 yards and two touchdowns in 14 games and one start.

=== 2016 season ===
White had a breakout season as the Patriots primary passing back with Lewis starting the season on the physically unable to perform list.

During Week 5, which was Tom Brady's return from suspension from Deflategate, White had four receptions for 63 yards in a 33–13 road victory over the Cleveland Browns. In the next game against the Cincinnati Bengals, he caught two touchdowns, a 15-yarder and a six-yarder, while recording a team-high eight receptions for 47 yards and rushing seven times for 19 yards during the 35–17 victory. The following week against the Pittsburgh Steelers, White caught his third touchdown of the season.

During a Week 11 30–17 victory over the San Francisco 49ers, White caught six passes for 63 yards and recorded his fourth touchdown of the season. Three weeks later against the Baltimore Ravens on Monday Night Football, White caught three passes for 81 yards, including a 61-yard catch and run in the 30–23 victory. During a Week 16 41–3 victory over the New York Jets, White caught three passes for 32 yards and a touchdown, making it his fifth receiving touchdown of the season. With his Week 16 performance, White became one of four running backs to have 500 or more receiving yards in the 2016 season.

White finished the 2016 season with 60 receptions for 551 yards and five touchdowns to go along with 39 carries for 166 yards in 16 games and four starts.

==== Super Bowl LI ====
During Super Bowl LI against the Atlanta Falcons, White had 139 yards from scrimmage (29 rushing, 110 receiving). He joined Roger Craig as the only running back with more than 100 receiving yards in a Super Bowl and broke Denver Broncos wide receiver Demaryius Thomas's previous record for most receptions in a Super Bowl, which came in a 43–8 loss to the Seahawks in Super Bowl XLVIII, with 14. He scored three touchdowns and a two-point conversion, setting a record for points in a Super Bowl, with 20; that record was tied for the first time in Super Bowl LVII by Jalen Hurts.

All of White's 20 points in Super Bowl LI came after the Patriots trailed 28–3 midway through the third quarter. Danny Amendola's two-point conversion following White's second touchdown tied the game at 28, sending the Super Bowl to overtime for the first time ever. In overtime, White delivered the game-winning play by rushing two yards into the end zone for a touchdown as the Patriots won 34–28, becoming the first team in 134 tries to win when trailing by more than 17 points after three quarters in a postseason game (the Patriots trailed by 19). He was the first player in Super Bowl history to have a touchdown and a two-point conversion in one game.

Brady, who won the Super Bowl MVP award, said that he believed White should have won the award instead. To show his thanks, Brady gave White his MVP prize, a pick-up truck, which White accepted. Several commentators, as well as Pittsburgh Steelers running back Le'Veon Bell, also believed that White should have won the award.

White was the first player to score in overtime in a Super Bowl and the second player to score the winning touchdown in overtime in an NFL championship game after Alan Ameche, a fellow Wisconsin Badger, who did so for the Baltimore Colts in 1958.

=== 2017 season ===
On April 18, 2017, White, who was entering the final year of his rookie contract, signed a three-year, $12 million extension through the 2020 season. The contract included $4.69 million in guarantees and an additional $3 million in incentives.

White finished the 2017 season with 43 carries for 171 yards to go along with 56 receptions for 429 yards and three touchdowns in 14 games and four starts. The Patriots finished the season with a 13–3 record and qualified for the playoffs as the #1-seed. In the Divisional Round against the Tennessee Titans, White recorded a rushing touchdown and receiving touchdown. He finished the 35–14 victory with 11 rushing yards and 29 receiving yards. During the AFC Championship Game against the Jacksonville Jaguars, White recorded the Patriots' first touchdown of the game on a one-yard rush, and the team would go on to win 24–20 and advance to Super Bowl LII. He finished the game with four rushing yards and 22 receiving yards. In the Super Bowl, White had seven carries for 45 yards and scored the Patriots' first touchdown of the game on a 26-yard rush while also catching two passes for 21 yards, but the Patriots lost 41–33 to the Eagles.

=== 2018 season ===
In 2018, White was named a team captain for the first time in his career. During the season opener against the Houston Texans, White rushed five times for 18 yards and caught four passes for 38 yards and a touchdown in the 27–20 victory. Three weeks later against the Miami Dolphins, he rushed for 44 yards and a touchdown while also catching eight receptions for 68 yards and a touchdown in the 38–7 victory. In the next game against the Indianapolis Colts, White tied his career-high with 10 receptions for 77 yards and a touchdown during the 38–24 victory.

During a Week 7 38–31 road victory over the Chicago Bears, White rushed for 40 yards and caught eight passes for 57 yards and two touchdowns. Two weeks later against the Green Bay Packers on Sunday Night Football, he had 12 carries for 31 yards and six receptions for 72 yards in the 31–17 victory. Following a Week 11 bye, White rushed for a career-high 73 yards during a 27–13 road victory over the Jets.

White finished the regular season setting career-highs in rushing yards with 425, rushing touchdowns with five, receptions with 87, receiving yards with 751, and receiving touchdowns with seven in 16 games and three starts.

In the Divisional Round against the Los Angeles Chargers, White tied the all-time single-game playoff receptions record with 15 and finished the 41–28 victory with 97 receiving yards. During the AFC Championship Game, the Patriots went on the road to face the Chiefs. White had six carries for 23 yards and four receptions for 49 yards, including a 30-yard reception, his team's longest of the game, as the Patriots defeated the Chiefs 37–31 on the road in overtime to reach Super Bowl LIII. In the Super Bowl, which was played on White's 27th birthday, rookie Sony Michel took over most of the rushing duties, leaving White in a limited role as the Patriots defeated the Los Angeles Rams by a score of 13–3. He finished the Super Bowl with four rushing yards and five receiving yards.

=== 2019 season ===
During a Week 2 43–0 shutout road victory over the Dolphins, White scored his first touchdown of the season on a 10-yard pass. During Week 9 against the Ravens on Sunday Night Football, White earned his first start of the season and rushed for 38 yards and his first rushing touchdown of the year along with catching two passes for 46 yards in the 37–20 road loss. During Week 13 against the Texans on Sunday Night Football, White rushed 14 times for 79 yards including a career-long 32-yard rush and caught eight passes for 98 yards and two touchdowns in the 28–22 road loss.

White finished the 2019 season with 67 carries for 263 yards and a touchdown to go along with 72 receptions for 645 yards and five touchdowns in 15 games and one start.

=== 2020 season ===
A few hours prior to the Week 2 matchup against the Seahawks on Sunday Night Football, White's father died in a car crash and his mother was left in critical condition. White was listed as an inactive player for the game. During the 35–30 road loss, teammate Devin McCourty ran up to the camera and yelled "28, we love you bro!" after recording a pick six. During Week 12, White scored two rushing touchdowns in the 20–17 victory over the Arizona Cardinals.

White finished the 2020 season with 35 carries for 121 yards and two touchdowns to go along with 49 receptions for 375 yards and a touchdown in 14 games and no starts.

=== 2021 season ===
On March 25, 2021, White re-signed with the Patriots on a one-year, $2.5 million contract.

During a Week 3 28–13 loss to the New Orleans Saints, White rushed for six yards before suffering a hip injury in the second quarter. He was placed on injured reserve on October 1, 2021.

=== 2022 season and retirement ===
On March 15, 2022, White signed a two-year, $5 million contract extension with the Patriots. Despite this, he announced his retirement via Twitter on August 11.

== Career statistics ==
=== NFL ===
Legend
	Won the Super Bowl
**Bold**	Career high

==== Regular season ====
Year	Team	Games		Rushing					Receiving					Fumbles	
Year	Team	GP	GS	Att	Yds	Avg	Lng	TD	Rec	Yds	Avg	Lng	TD	Fum	Lost
2014	NE	3	0	9	38	4.2	11	0	5	23	4.6	11	0	0	0
2015	NE	14	1	22	56	2.5	8	2	40	410	**10.3**	**68**	4	0	0
2016	NE	16	4	39	166	4.3	16	0	60	551	9.2	61	5	0	0
2017	NE	14	4	43	171	4.0	10	0	56	429	7.7	27	3	0	0
2018	NE	16	3	**94**	**425**	**4.5**	27T	**5**	**87**	**751**	8.6	42	**7**	0	0
2019	NE	15	1	67	263	3.9	**32**	1	72	645	9.0	59	5	**1**	**1**
2020	NE	14	0	35	121	3.5	10	2	49	375	7.7	34	1	**1**	0
2021	NE	3	0	10	38	3.8	10	1	12	94	7.8	28	0	0	0
Career		95	13	319	1,278	4.0	32	11	381	3,278	8.1	68	25	2	1

==== Postseason ====
Year	Team	Games		Rushing					Receiving					Fumbles	
Year	Team	GP	GS	Att	Yds	Avg	Lng	TD	Rec	Yds	Avg	Lng	TD	Fum	Lost
2014	NE	0	0	DNP											
2015	NE	2	1	6	16	2.7	8	0	7	84	12.0	29	0	**1**	0
2016	NE	3	0	7	29	4.1	10	2	18	137	9.2	28	**2**	0	0
2017	NE	3	0	**14**	**60**	4.3	**26T**	**3**	9	72	7.7	15	1	0	0
2018	NE	3	1	8	27	3.8	9	0	**20**	**151**	7.6	**30**	0	0	0
2019	NE	1	1	1	14	**14.0**	14	0	5	62	**12.4**	29	0	**1**	**1**
2021	NE	0	0	Did not play due to injury											
Career		12	3	36	146	4.1	26T	5	59	506	8.6	30	3	2	1

=== College ===
Season	Team	Rushing					Receiving				
Season	Team	Att	Yds	Avg	Lng	TD	Rec	Yds	Avg	Lng	TD
2010	Wisconsin	156	1,052	6.7	66	14	11	88	8.0	26	0
2011	Wisconsin	141	713	5.1	49	6	15	150	10.0	40	0
2012	Wisconsin	125	806	6.4	69	12	8	132	16.5	62	1
2013	Wisconsin	221	1,444	6.5	93	13	39	300	7.7	35	2
Career		643	4,015	6.2	93	45	73	670	9.2	62	3

== Career highlights ==
=== Awards and honors ===
NFL

- 3× Super Bowl champion (XLIX, LI, LIII)
- New England Patriots All-2010s Team
- New England Patriots All-Dynasty Team

College

- 2× Second-team All-Big Ten (2010, 2013)
- Big Ten Freshman of the Year (2010)

=== Records ===
==== NFL records ====
- Most receptions in a playoff game: 15 (tied with Darren Sproles)

==== Super Bowl records ====
- Most receptions: 14
- Most receiving yards by a running back: 110
- Most points scored: 20 (tied with Jalen Hurts)
- Most points scored in overtime: 6 (tied with Mecole Hardman)

== Broadcasting career ==
Following his retirement, White was hired by Sports USA Radio Network as an NFL analyst beginning in the 2022 season. He has also appeared on the ESPN program Get Up and on SiriusXM NFL Radio's The Opening Drive. In 2023, White joined Big Ten Network as a football analyst.

White co-hosts The Money Down Podcast with his former Wisconsin Badger colleagues Sojourn Shelton and Warren Herring.
