= David Gilreath =

American football player (born 1988)

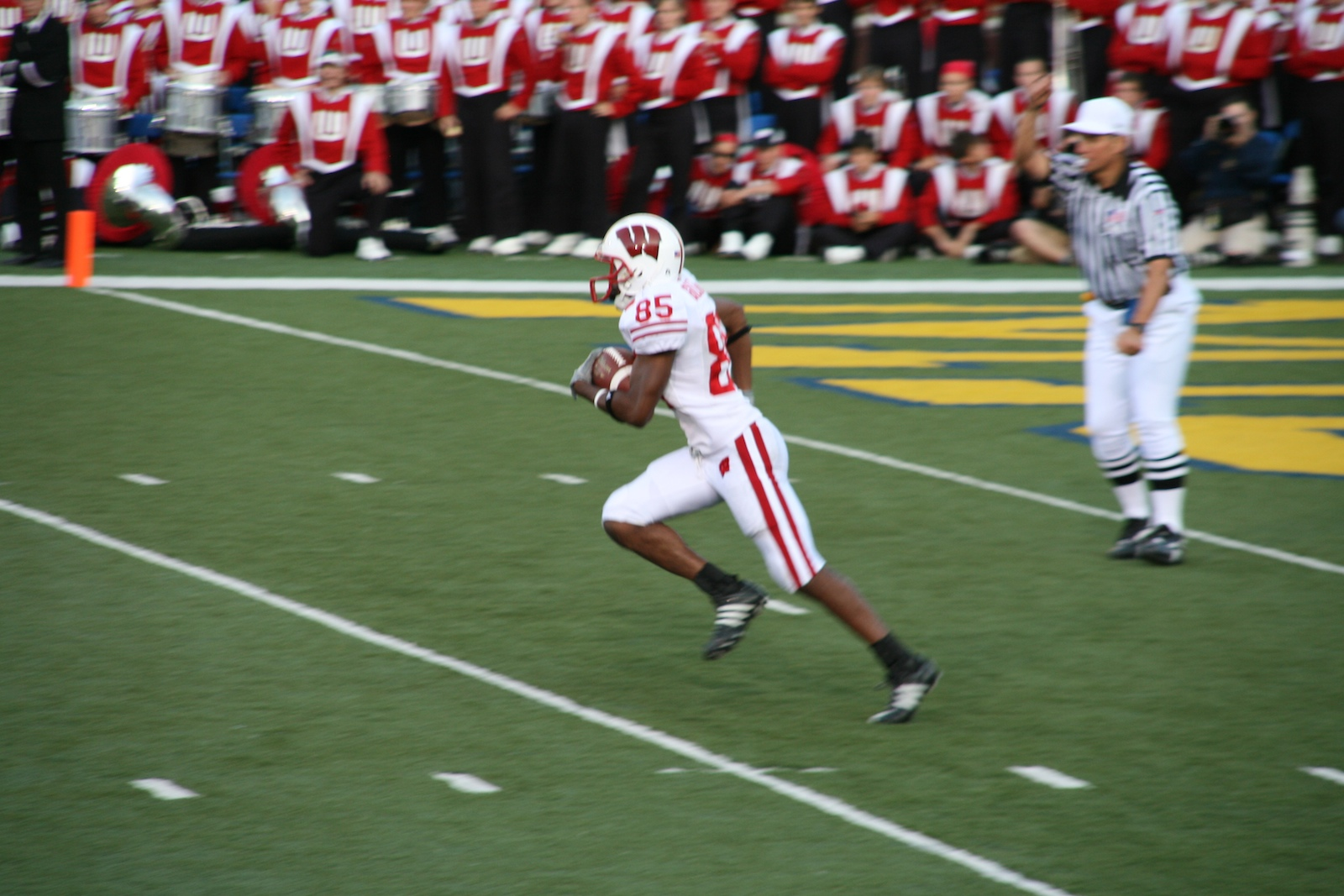
- Gilreath with Wisconsin In 2008

No. 18
- Position: Wide receiver

Personal information
- Born: December 11, 1988 (age 37); St. Paul, Minnesota, U.S.
- Listed height: 5 ft 9 in (1.75 m)
- Listed weight: 170 lb (77 kg)

Career information
- High school: Plymouth (MN) Armstrong
- College: Wisconsin
- NFL draft: 2011: undrafted

Career history
- Indianapolis Colts (2011)*; St. Louis Rams (2011)*; Buffalo Bills (2011)*; Pittsburgh Steelers (2012); Tampa Bay Buccaneers (2012); Pittsburgh Steelers (2012); Oakland Raiders (2014)*; Seattle Seahawks (2014)
- * Offseason or practice squad member only

Awards and highlights
- Second-team All-Big Ten (2008)

Career NFL statistics
- Rushing yards: 7
- Return yards: 8
- Stats at Pro Football Reference

David Gilreath (born December 11, 1988) is an American former professional football player who was a wide receiver in the National Football League (NFL). He played college football for the Wisconsin Badgers.

== Early life ==
Gilreath attended high school at Robbinsdale Armstrong in Plymouth, Minnesota, after transferring from Minneapolis Washburn in Minneapolis, where he played for three years. He lettered in football four times, baseball twice and track once.

As a senior, Gilreath caught 26 passes for 424 yards and four touchdowns, while rushing 28 times for 504 yards and two touchdowns, also returned 13 punts for 185 yards and 16 kickoffs for 358 yards and a touchdown. During his football career, Gilreath totaled 153 receptions for 2,496 yards and 45 touchdowns, along with 1,022 rushing yards. He was rated among the nation's top 75 wide receivers and the number six player in Minnesota by Rivals.com.

== College career ==
=== 2007 ===
Played in 13 games at wide receiver and in the return game. Set Wisconsin records for kickoff return yards in a season (967) and in a game (189). Led the Big Ten and ranked 14th nationally with 14.0-yard punt return average (fourth-best season average in UW history). Set UW bowl game records with his season-best 60-yard kickoff return against 16th-ranked Tennessee in the 2008 Outback Bowl. Named Big Ten Special Teams Player of the Week after accumulating 148 yards on punt (73) and kickoff (75) returns in a win over The Citadel on September 15 (first Badger true freshman to earn conference player of the week honors since Ron Dayne in 1996). Named First-team Freshman All-American by Rivals.com and Scout.com. Second-team Freshman All-American and first-team Freshman All-Big Ten by The Sporting News.

=== 2008 ===
Played in all 13 games and started nine. Finished the season with 1,747 all-purpose yards which ranked eighth-best all-time at Wisconsin. Finished second on the team with 31 catches for 520 yards and three receiving touchdowns. Ranked sixth in the Big Ten with 134.4 all-purpose yards per game. Named Big Ten Co-Offensive Player of the Week after rushing for a career-high 168 yards and two scores on eight carries, including a 90-yard touchdown (second longest run in UW history) at Indiana on November 8. Named second-team All-Big Ten (coaches) and honorable mention Sophomore All-American by Collegefootballnews.com.

=== 2009 ===
Played in 13 games and started one. Finished second on the team with 984 all-purpose yards. Named Big Ten Special Teams Player of the Week after returning two kickoffs for 94 yards against Hawaii on December 5.

=== 2010 ===
Played in 11 games and started seven. Led the team in punt return yards, kickoff returns and kickoff return yards, second in all-purpose yards, third in receiving yards and fourth in receptions and rushing yards. Named Big Ten Special Teams Player of the Week after returning opening kickoff 97 yards (tied for fourth-longest in school history) for a touchdown in win over No. 1 ranked Ohio State on October 16; returned four kicks for 163 yards (third-highest single game total in UW history and second-highest average with 40.8 yards per return) and added one punt return for 13 yards and one reception for 18 yards. Was named team's special team MVP. Left school The Big Ten all-time leader in kick off return yards (3,025). Only player in Wisconsin history to score a receiving, rushing, punt return, and a kick return touchdown

=== College statistics ===
Year	Team	Rec	Rec Yds	Rec Avg	Rec TDs	Rush	Rush Yds	Rush TDs	Kick Ret	Kick Ret Yds	Kick Ret Avg	Kick Ret TDs	Punt Ret	Punt Ret Yds	Punt Ret Avg	Punt Ret TDs
2007	Wisconsin	1	10	10.0	0	7	15	0	42	967	23.0	0	26	364	14.0	0
2008	Wisconsin	31	520	16.8	3	25	285	2	40	784	19.6	0	18	158	8.8	0
2009	Wisconsin	12	177	14.8	0	19	75	2	26	615	23.7	0	21	117	5.6	1
2010	Wisconsin	23	370	16.1	1	7	67	0	27	659	24.4	1	8	82	10.2	0
College totals		67	1,077	16.1	4	58	442	4	135	3,025	22.4	1	73	721	9.9	1

== Professional career ==
Pre-draft measurables
Height	Weight	40-yard dash	10-yard split	20-yard split	20-yard shuttle	Three-cone drill	Vertical jump	Broad jump	Bench press	Wonderlic
5 ft 9.4 in (1.76 m)	170 lb (77 kg)	4.42 s	1.47 s	2.53 s	4.21 s	6.58 s	33.5 in (0.85 m)	9 ft 8 in (2.95 m)	6 reps	15
All values from Pro Day

=== Indianapolis Colts ===
On July 29, 2011, Gilreath was signed as an undrafted free agent by the Indianapolis Colts. On September 3, 2011, Gilreath was cut by the Colts but was re-signed to the practice squad two days later. On October 25, 2011, Gilreath was cut by the Colts.

=== Pittsburgh Steelers ===
On January 20, 2012, Gilreath was signed by the Pittsburgh Steelers. In a preseason game against the Indianapolis Colts on August 19, 2012, Gilreath caught 4 passes for 78 yards and was named Steelers Digest Player of the Week. On September 1, 2012, Gilreath was signed to the Pittsburgh Steelers Practice Squad. He was promoted to the active roster on November 12, 2012. On November 26, Gilreath was waived. Signed back to Steelers Practice Squad November 27. He was promoted to the active roster on December 31, 2012.
