= Gabe Carimi =

American football player (born 1988)

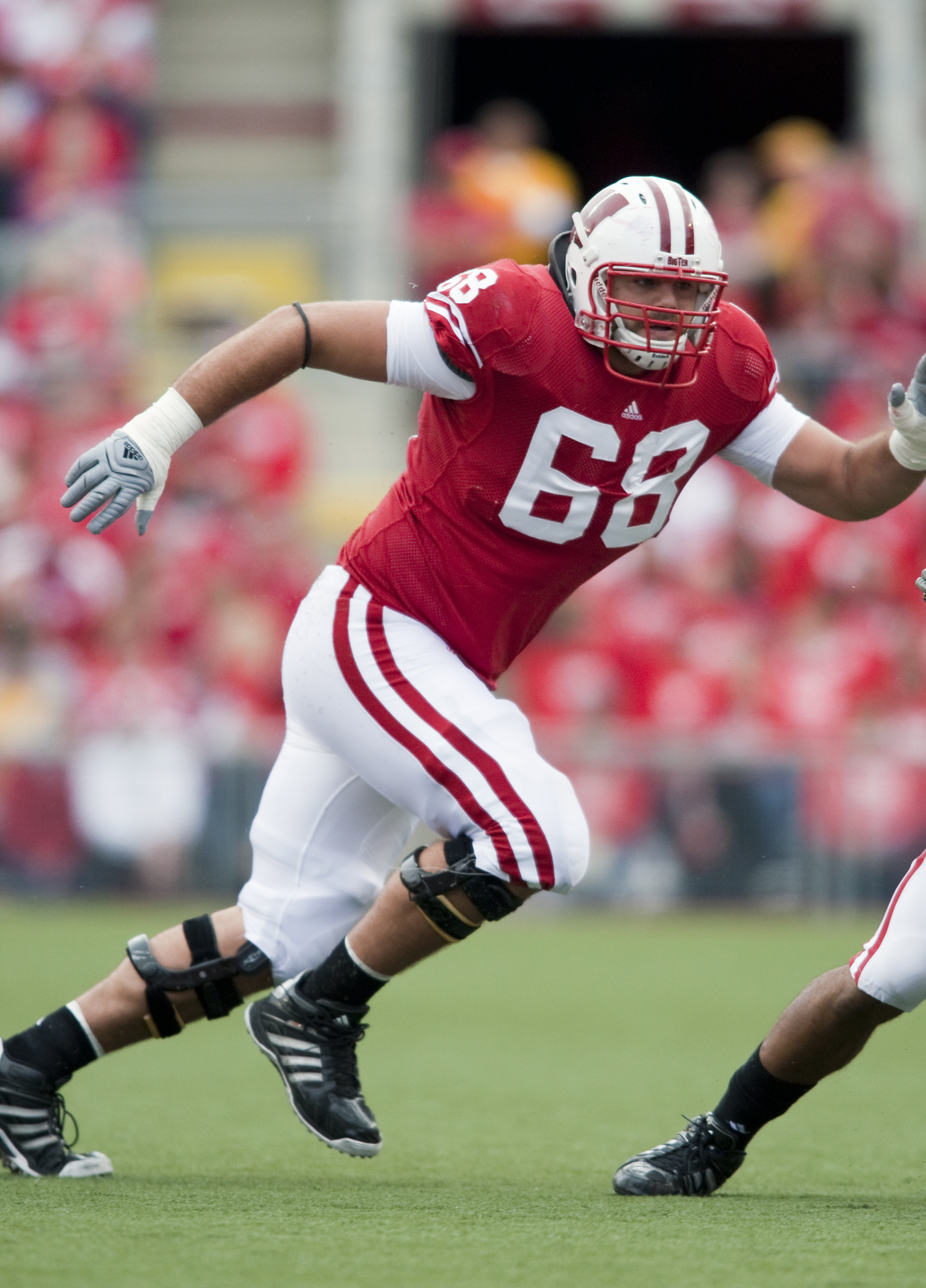
- Carimi with the Wisconsin Badgers in 2010

No. 72, 68
- Position: Guard

Personal information
- Born: June 13, 1988 (age 38); Lake Forest, Illinois, U.S.
- Listed height: 6 ft 7 in (2.01 m)
- Listed weight: 316 lb (143 kg)

Career information
- High school: Monona Grove (Monona, Wisconsin)
- College: Wisconsin (2006–2010)
- NFL draft: 2011: 1st round, 29th overall pick

Career history
- Chicago Bears (2011–2012); Tampa Bay Buccaneers (2013); Atlanta Falcons (2014)

Awards and highlights
- Outland Trophy (2010); Jim Parker Trophy (2010); Unanimous All-American (2010); Big Ten Offensive Lineman of the Year (2010); 2× First-team All-Big Ten (2009, 2010)

Career NFL statistics
- Games played: 48
- Games started: 26
- Stats at Pro Football Reference

Gabriel Andrew Carimi (/kəˈriːmi/ kə-REE-mee; born June 13, 1988) is an American former professional football player who was a guard in the National Football League (NFL). Carimi had 49 starts at left tackle in his four-year Wisconsin Badgers college career, which culminated at the 2011 Rose Bowl. He was awarded the 2010 Outland Trophy, as the nation's top collegiate interior lineman. He was also a unanimous All-American, and the Big Ten Offensive Lineman of the Year.

Carimi was selected by the Chicago Bears in the first round, 29th overall pick, of the 2011 NFL draft. He began the 2011 season as the Bears' starting right tackle. Carimi was traded to the Tampa Bay Buccaneers on June 9, 2013, for the Buccaneers' 2014 6th round pick. He signed with the Atlanta Falcons in 2014, and played in all 16 games for them that season, making 7 starts.

== Early life ==
Carimi was born in Lake Forest, Illinois. He attended Monona Grove High School in Monona, Wisconsin. He started there as a 6 ft 5 in (1.96 m), 220-pound (100 kg) freshman. He grew into his body, worked on his flexibility, and developed his athleticism by becoming a karate black belt. He credits his karate training with laying a foundation for his later discipline, improving his flexibility, and helping him develop the hand coordination and hand placement he uses as a football player.

He was on the high school's track team. Seeded 15th in the state in discus as a senior, he placed 5th in the 2006 Wisconsin Interscholastic Athletic Association track and field Division 1 discus championships, at 157 ft 8 in (48.1 m). He earned four letters in track, and was team captain in his senior year.

Carimi also played football for the high school's Silver Eagles. Playing both offensive and defensive tackle, he lettered for four years. In 2005, the Silver Eagles ran behind him 70% of the time when he was at offensive tackle, while as a defensive end he had five quarterback sacks.

He was voted a football Parade All-American and PrepStar All-American as a senior, while he captained the team. He was also the Capital Times and Wisconsin State Journal Player of the Year, first-team all-state in 2005, a first-team selection by the Associated Press and the Wisconsin Football Coaches Association (as a two-way player), and was twice first-team all-conference. Regarded as a three-star recruit by Rivals.com, Carimi was rated the No. 3 football player in Wisconsin and the No. 30 offensive tackle prospect in the class of 2006. His coach Mike Stassi predicted: "He's going to be the new wave of offensive linemen, that can run and move. And this guy's got it all."

== College career ==
Carimi elected to attend his hometown University of Wisconsin-Madison. He chose it because of its academic and football reputations, a scholarship that he was offered, and its proximity to his home. He majored in civil engineering, and played football for the Wisconsin Badgers football team.

He had played right tackle and defensive end in high school. But in his first year in 2006, during which time he was redshirted, he began practicing at left tackle, because it was the next open spot. He was described that season as running very well, and having tenacity, athletic ability, and impressive lateral movement while pass-blocking.

Carimi started all 13 games as a freshman at left tackle for the Badgers in 2007, replacing All-American Joe Thomas, who was drafted by the Cleveland Browns at No. 3 in the first round of the 2007 NFL draft. He was a second-team Freshman All-American selection by Rivals.com and The Sporting News, and a first-team Freshman All-Big-Ten selection by The Sporting News, as well as an Academic All-Big-Ten.

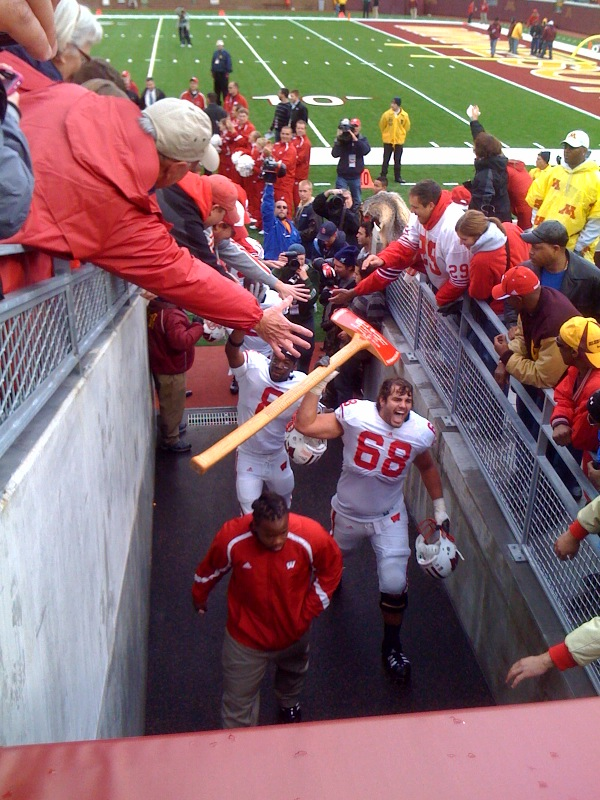
Carimi in 2009

As a sophomore in 2008, he started all 10 games he played in. That year, he was second-team Pre-season All-Big Ten by Lindy's and Athlon Sports, honorable mention Sophomore All-American by College Football News, and Academic All-Big Ten.

As a junior in 2009, he started all 13 games. He was a first-team Mid-season All-Big Ten selection by Phil Steele, a first-team All-Big Ten selection by media, a fourth-team All-American by Phil Steele, and Academic All-Big Ten. Commenting in Sports Illustrated in October 2009, Tony Pauline wrote: "Carimi is the next great offensive lineman to come from the Badger program. He's a terrific pass-protecting left tackle, with the size necessary to grow into a dominant run blocker."

During his senior year in 2010, when he was co-Captain of the Big Ten champion Badgers, Phil Steele made him a mid-season first-team All-American selection. He contributed to an offense that was ranked 5th in the nation in scoring (at 41.5 ppg), and 12th in rushing (at 245.7 yards per game).

As a senior, Carimi won the 2010 Outland Trophy, awarded to the nation's top collegiate interior lineman. He was the second Outland Trophy winner in school history, joining Joe Thomas, and the 14th Big Ten awardee. Seven of the prior ten Outland Trophy winners were top-10 NFL draft picks.

He also was named the Big Ten Offensive Lineman of the Year, and was recognized as a unanimous first-team All-American, having received first-team honors from the Associated Press, American Football Coaches Association, Football Writers Association of America, Sporting News, and Walter Camp Football Foundation. In addition, he was a consensus first-team All-Big Ten selection, and Academic All-Big Ten, and won the Wayne Souza Coaches Appreciation Award (Offense). He helped Wisconsin to an 11–2 record for the season, and a Rose Bowl appearance. At the start of his senior year he had been named a pre-season first-team All-American by Lindy's and Consensus Draft Services, a first-team All-American and All-Big Ten by Athlon Sports, second-team All-American and first-team All-Big Ten by Phil Steele, second-team All-American by The Kickoff, first-team All-Big Ten by Blue Ribbon, and named to the Lombardi Award Watch List. He was named a mid-season first-team All-American and first-team mid-season All-Big Ten by Phil Steele, and second-team All-American by Sports Illustrated. In March 2011, the National Jewish Sports Hall of Fame awarded him the Marty Glickman Award, as the male Jewish Athlete of the Year.

In college, he started 49 of a possible 52 games, all at left tackle. In an April 2011 interview, he indicated that he had still never been to a professional football game in his life.

== Professional career ==
=== 2011 NFL draft ===
Pre-draft measurables
Height	Weight	Arm length	Hand span	Wingspan	40-yard dash	10-yard split	20-yard split	Vertical jump	Broad jump	Bench press
6 ft 7 in (2.01 m)	314 lb (142 kg)	35 in (0.89 m)	10 3/8 in (0.26 m)	6 ft 11 in (2.11 m)	5.27 s	1.80 s	3.02 s	31.5 in (0.80 m)	9 ft 1 in (2.77 m)	29 reps
All values from NFL Combine

Carimi was selected in the first round of the 2011 NFL draft by the Chicago Bears, with the 29th pick on April 28, 2011. The Bears had actually sought to trade up and pick Carimi even earlier in the draft. They tried to make a trade with the Baltimore Ravens, to use Baltimore's earlier slot to select Carimi at No. 26, but the trade fell through at the last moment due to a miscommunication. In the year prior to drafting Carimi, the Bears had allowed a league-high 56 sacks, and ranked 22nd in running the ball.

Bears Head Coach Lovie Smith said Carimi would come in as a left tackle. General manager Jerry Angelo said he is versatile enough to play both left and right tackle, while Smith said the Bears would keep all options open, including potentially that of guard. He was nicknamed "The Bear Jew" after the Bears drafted him, a reference to a character in the movie Inglourious Basterds, by Chicago radio personality Dan Bernstein, of 670 "The Score." Carimi tweeted that he was considering adopting the nickname.

At the January 2011 Senior Bowl weigh-in, Carimi was the second-tallest player at 6 feet 7 1/8 inches (2,010 mm), had the second-longest arms (35 1/4 inches or 900 millimetres), and had the second-longest wingspan (83 1/4 in or 2,110 mm; second to Mississippi State's Derek Sherrod). His hand size was 10 3/8 inches (260 mm), and he weighed in at 315 pounds, 10 pounds lighter than his playing weight in college. ESPN analysts rated him the third-best player at the Senior Bowl.

"On the field it is a grimy sport, and you have to be tough and physical."

— Gabe Carimi

NFL Network analyst Mike Mayock compared Carimi to Jon Runyan. Mayock also described him as "a thug, which I mean in a positive sense", and commented on his ability as a run blocker. He added: "I think he's the kind of guy ... you try ... at left tackle, and if he can't handle the speed out there, you've got an All-Pro right tackle."

Matt Bowen of the National Football Post said that Carimi was his favorite prospect in the draft, and was one of the five players who most impressed him at Senior Bowl activities. Bowen thought his pass protection was at NFL standards, noting that he had "good enough feet to get back and attack speed off of the edge because of his reach. There is no doubt Carimi can win up front in the run game," while adding that he "is the type of player you want in the locker room". Wes Bunting of the National Football Post said, "he understands angles, and he's a real velcro player. I mean, once he gets those big paws on you and he has these long arms, it's really tough to disengage from... No one gets after the run game as well as Carimi." Neil Hayes of the Chicago Sun-Times wrote: "Many consider Carimi to be the best offensive-tackle prospect in the class ... Carimi played well against top competition and his feet are quick enough to play left tackle." CBS Sports lauded his size and athleticism. With regard to his run blocking, it said he is "known as an athletic pass protector, but is a strong blocker". While he exclusively played left tackle in college, he was projected by some as a left tackle and by others as a right tackle.

At the February 2011 NFL Combine pre-draft workouts, he completed 29 repetitions on the 225-pound bench press, a "solid number", according to Sports Illustrated's Tony Pauline. He also ran the 40-yard dash in under 5.2, which was faster than expected and considered very good. Pauline reported that "his footwork was smooth in pass protection, and he looked strong in run blocking drills". At the March Wisconsin Pro Day workout, Bucky Brooks of NFL.com reported that Carimi "showed good footwork and lateral quickness in drills, and his body control is surprising given his frame".

=== Chicago Bears ===
On July 29, 2011, the Bears signed Carimi to a $7.056 million four-year contract. He began his rookie 2011 season as the Bears' starting right tackle. In Week 2 against the New Orleans Saints, Carimi suffered a season-ending injury to his right knee, that included the dislocation of his kneecap and which required multiple surgeries, including one in December to repair connective tissue around his patella and medial collateral ligament. He played two games for the season, starting both of them at right tackle. In 2012, controversy ensued when the Saints were found working with a bounty program, which led to questions over whether Carimi was among the players targeted.

In 2012–13, Carimi played in 16 games, starting 14 of them (11 at right tackle, and 3 at right guard). After 11 starts at right tackle Carimi was moved from right tackle, where he was replaced by Jonathan Scott, to guard, though he came back to start the last game of the season at right tackle. Due to injuries to Lance Louis and Chris Spencer in Week 12 against the Minnesota Vikings, Carimi played at guard for the first time in his career.

=== Tampa Bay Buccaneers ===
On June 9, 2013, Carimi was traded to the Tampa Bay Buccaneers for a 2014 sixth-round selection. The Bucs offensive line coach Bob Bostad coached Carimi at Wisconsin.

Carimi was expected to compete with Demar Dotson for the starting right tackle position on Tampa Bay. He started the first two games of the season at left guard.

Carimi had two years left on his contract, and was scheduled to earn a guaranteed base salary of $1,016,000 in 2013. On February 10, 2014, the Buccaneers cut Carimi. His release came after a few weeks of his former Bears head coach, Lovie Smith, being hired as the Buccaneer's new head coach.

=== Atlanta Falcons ===
On February 17, 2014, Carimi signed with the Atlanta Falcons for one year. Their offensive line coach was Mike Tice, with whom Carimi had worked when he played for the Bears.

During the season, Carimi played in all 16 games, making 7 starts. He played left and right tackle, right guard, and tight end, playing 597 snaps (215 as a run-blocker; 382 as a pass-blocker).

== Personal life ==
Carimi, born in Lake Forest, Illinois, is the son of Sanford Carimi, a physician in the Janesville, Wisconsin area, and Alayne Gardner-Carimi, a businesswoman. He weighed 24 pounds by the time he was four months old. He grew up on the Northeast Side of Madison, and then in the nearby town of Cottage Grove when he was a freshman in high school. His sister Hannah, who is two years older than he is, was a kick fighter when she was younger and later rowed for the University of Wisconsin, on its women's openweight crew team. The two of them lived together in college, along with one of his football team teammates.

Carimi's Italian surname comes from his paternal step-grandfather. His parents are Jewish. His mother, originally Catholic, converted to Judaism, and has had an active role in the religious education of her children. Carimi is a practicing Jew and very committed to his religion, and found time as a youth to both go to his football practices and to attend Madison's Temple Beth-El, a Reform synagogue. By the time of his Bar Mitzvah, he was already so tall that while blessing him, and even with Carimi bending down, the synagogue's education director had to put his hands on Carimi's shoulders rather than atop his head. For his Bar Mitzvah project, he helped build a house for Habitat for Humanity while he was in seventh grade. Carimi continued his Jewish studies after his Bar Mitzvah.

In his first year of college in 2007, when Yom Kippur (the holiest day of the year in Judaism; a fast day that is the "Day of Atonement") fell on a Saturday, he fasted until an hour before the Big Ten Conference opener against Iowa started that night. Carimi said, "Religion is a part of me, and I don't want to just say I'm Jewish. I actually do make sacrifices that I know are hard choices." At the 2011 NFL combine, when asked whether he would play on Yom Kippur in the NFL, he responded: "I already looked out over the next 15 years, and Yom Kippur doesn't fall on a Sunday."

As a college player he took the nickname "The Jewish Hammer" or "The Hammer". He explains that as The Hebrew Hammer was taken "they had to come up with something else", and that the "hammer" aspect refers to his penchant for throwing opposing players down on the field. A more recent nickname, following his being picked by the Chicago Bears, is "The Bear Jew", a reference to a character in the 2009 film Inglourious Basterds. One of his favorite Jewish football players was a former Badger, Matt Bernstein, and he looks to 49ers former offensive linesman Harris Barton as a role model.

His uncle suffered from leukemia as a child and underwent chemotherapy while he was in second grade, losing his hair in the process and ultimately passing away at the age of nine. He was mentioned often in family discussions. Carimi thought he would do something "that wouldn't take a lot of my time but would help other people." He grew his hair out for 20 months, until it was long enough in 2010 to donate to Locks of Love—a charity that makes wigs out of donated hair to help poor children suffering from illnesses that cause long-term hair loss. Carimi is married to former UW-Milwaukee basketball player/model Danielle Jorgenson. The couple have two children: a son and a daughter.

== See also ==
- List of select Jewish football players
