= 2010 All-America college football team =

Official list of the best college football players of 2010

The All-America college football team is an honor given annually to the best players of American college football at their respective positions. The original All-America team was the 1889 All-America college football team selected by Caspar Whitney. In 1950, the National Collegiate Athletic Bureau, which is the National Collegiate Athletic Association's (NCAA) service bureau, compiled the first list of All-Americans including first-team selections on teams created for a national audience that received national circulation with the intent of recognizing selections made from viewpoints that were nationwide. Since 1952, College Sports Information Directors of America (CoSIDA) has bestowed Academic All-American recognition on male and female athletes in Divisions I, II, and III of the NCAA as well as National Association of Intercollegiate Athletics athletes, covering all NCAA championship sports.

The 2010 All-America college football team is composed of the following first teams: Associated Press (AP), Football Writers Association of America (FWAA), American Football Coaches Association (AFCA), Walter Camp Foundation (WCFF), The Sporting News (TSN), Sports Illustrated (SI), Pro Football Weekly (PFW), ESPN, CBS Sports (CBS), College Football News (CFN), Rivals.com, and Scout.com.

Currently, NCAA compiles consensus all-America teams in the sports of Division I-FBS football and Division I men’s basketball using a point system computed from All-America teams named by coaches associations or media sources. The system consists of three points for first team, two points for second team and one point for third team. Honorable mention and fourth team or lower recognitions are not accorded any points. Football consensus teams are compiled by position and the player accumulating the most points at each position is named first team consensus all-American. Currently, the NCAA recognizes All-Americans selected by the AP, AFCA, FWAA, TSN, and the WCFF to determine Consensus All-Americans.

In 2010, there were 10 unanimous All-Americans.

Name	Position	Year	University
Prince Amukamara	Defensive back	Senior	Nebraska
Justin Blackmon	Wide receiver	Sophomore	Oklahoma St.
Da'Quan Bowers	Defensive line	Junior	Clemson
Gabe Carimi	Offensive line	Senior	Wisconsin
Rodney Hudson	Offensive line	Senior	Florida St.
LaMichael James	Running back	Sophomore	Oregon
Greg Jones	Linebacker	Senior	Michigan St.
Ryan Kerrigan	Defensive line	Senior	Purdue
Luke Kuechly	Linebacker	Sophomore	Boston College
Patrick Peterson	Defensive back	Junior	LSU

== Offense ==
=== Quarterback ===
- Cam Newton, Auburn -- CONSENSUS -- (AFCA, AP-1, TSN, WCFF, CBS, CFN, ESPN, Rivals.com, Scout.com, SI)
- Kellen Moore, Boise State (FWAA, AP-3)
- Andrew Luck, Stanford (PFW, AP-2, WCFF-2, Scout.com-2)

=== Running back ===
- Kendall Hunter, Oklahoma State -- CONSENSUS -- (AFCA, AP-1, WCFF, PFW, Scout.com)
- LaMichael James, Oregon -- UNANIMOUS -- (AFCA, AP-1, FWAA, TSN, WCFF, CBS, CFN, ESPN, Rivals.com, Scout.com, SI)
- Denard Robinson, Michigan (FWAA)
- Jordan Todman, Connecticut (TSN, CBS, ESPN, Rivals.com, SI, AP-2, WCFF-2, Scout.com-2)
- Marcus Lattimore, South Carolina (CFN, WCFF-2, Scout.com-2)
- Mikel Leshoure, Illinois (AP-2)
- John Clay, Wisconsin (AP-3)
- Vai Taua, Nevada (AP-3)

=== Wide receiver ===
- Justin Blackmon, Oklahoma State -- UNANIMOUS -- (AFCA, AP-1, FWAA, TSN, WCFF, CBS, CFN, ESPN, PFW, Rivals.com, Scout.com, SI)
- Ryan Broyles, Oklahoma -- CONSENSUS -- (AP-1, FWAA, TSN, WCFF, CBS, CFN, Rivals.com, SI, Scout.com-2)
- Alshon Jeffery, South Carolina (AFCA, FWAA, ESPN, Rivals.com, Scout.com, AP-2, WCFF-2)
- A. J. Green, Georgia (PFW, WCFF-2)
- Julio Jones, Alabama (AP-2, Scout.com-2)
- Greg Salas, Hawaii (AP-3)
- Titus Young, Boise State (AP-3)

=== Tight end ===
- Michael Egnew, Missouri -- CONSENSUS -- (AP-1, WCFF, CBS, CFN, Scout.com)
- Lance Kendricks, Wisconsin -- CONSENSUS -- (AFCA, TSN, PFW, SI, AP-2, WCFF-2)
- D. J. Williams, Arkansas (Scout.com-2, AP-3)

=== Tackle ===
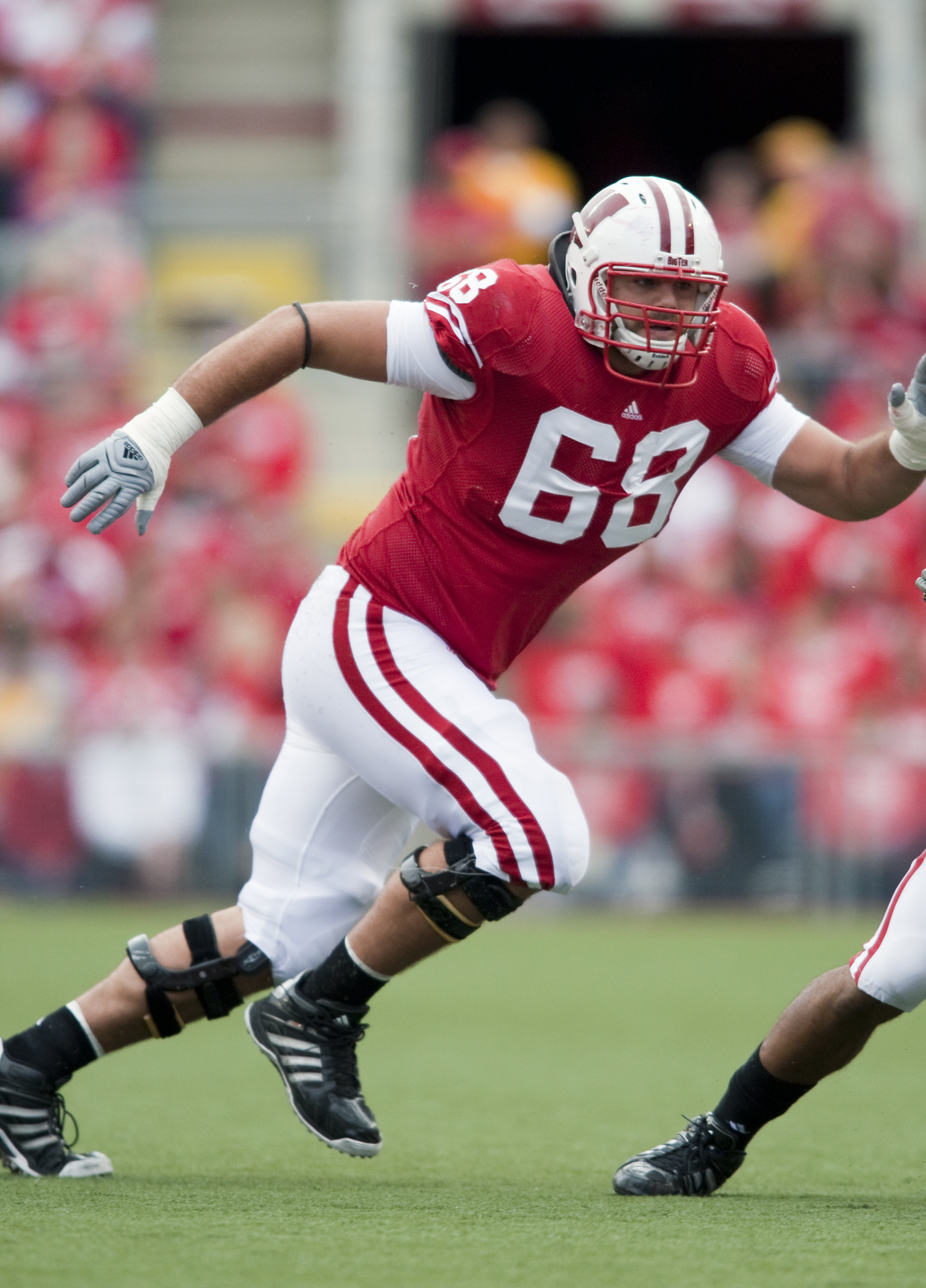
Gabe Carimi

- Gabe Carimi, Wisconsin -- UNANIMOUS -- (AFCA, AP-1, FWAA, TSN, WCFF, CBS, CFN, ESPN, Rivals.com, Scout.com, SI)
- Nate Solder, Colorado -- CONSENSUS -- (AP-1, FWAA, TSN, WCFF, ESPN, PFW, SI)
- Lee Ziemba, Auburn -- CONSENSUS -- (AFCA, FWAA, WCFF, SI, AP-2, Scout.com-2)
- Anthony Castonzo, Boston College (CFN, PFW, Scout.com, WCFF-2, AP-3)
- Jonathan Martin, Stanford (Scout.com)
- Derek Sherrod, Mississippi State (CBS, CFN, Rivals.com, AP-2, WCFF-2, Scout.com-2)
- Nate Potter, Boise State (AP-3)

=== Guard ===
- Rodney Hudson, Florida State -- UNANIMOUS -- (AFCA, AP-1, FWAA, TSN, WCFF, CBS, CFN, ESPN, Rivals.com, Scout.com, SI)
- John Moffitt, Wisconsin (AP-1, CBS, ESPN, Rivals.com)
- Stefen Wisniewski, Penn State (AFCA, Scout.com, AP-2, WCFF-2)
- Clint Boling, Georgia (PFW)
- Cordy Glenn, Georgia (PFW)
- Justin Boren, Ohio State (AP-2, Scout.com-2)
- Caleb Schlauderaff, Utah (WCFF-2, AP-3)
- Barrett Jones, Alabama (AP-3)

=== Center ===
- Chase Beeler, Stanford -- CONSENSUS -- (AFCA, AP-1, TSN, CBS, CFN, ESPN, Rivals.com, WCFF-2)
- Mike Brewster, Ohio State (FWAA, Scout.com-2)
- Jake Kirkpatrick, TCU (TSN, WCFF, AP-2)
- Mike Pouncey, Florida (PFW)
- Jordan Holmes, Oregon (Scout.com-2)
- Ryan Pugh, Auburn (AP-3)

== Defense ==
=== End ===
- Da'Quan Bowers, Clemson -- UNANIMOUS -- (AFCA, AP-1, FWAA, TSN, WCFF, CBS, CFN, ESPN, PFW, Rivals.com, Scout.com, SI)
- Ryan Kerrigan, Purdue -- UNANIMOUS -- (AFCA, AP-1, FWAA, TSN, WCFF, CBS, CFN, ESPN, Rivals.com, Scout.com, SI)
- Wayne Daniels, TCU (FWAA)
- Jabaal Sheard, Pittsburgh (AFCA)
- J. J. Watt, Wisconsin (PFW, AP-2, WCFF-2, Scout.com-2)
- Sam Acho, Texas (WCFF-2, AP-3)
- Jeremy Beal, Oklahoma (AP-2, WCFF-2)
- Quinton Coples, North Carolina (Scout.com-2)
- Brandon Jenkins, Florida State (Scout.com-2)

=== Tackle ===
- Adrian Clayborn, Iowa -- CONSENSUS -- (AFCA, WCFF, AP-3)
- Nick Fairley, Auburn -- CONSENSUS -- (AP-1, FWAA, TSN, WCFF, CBS, CFN, ESPN, PFW, Rivals.com, Scout.com, SI)
- Stephen Paea, Oregon State -- CONSENSUS -- (AP-1, TSN, CFN, ESPN, SI)
- Jared Crick, Nebraska (Rivals.com, AP-2, Scout.com-2)
- Marcell Dareus, Alabama (PFW, AP-3)
- Drake Nevis, LSU (CBS, AP-2, WCFF-2)
- Billy Winn, Boise State (AP-3)

=== Linebacker ===
- Greg Jones, Michigan State -- UNANIMOUS -- (AFCA, AP-1, FWAA, TSN, WCFF, CBS, Scout.com, SI)
- Luke Kuechly, Boston College -- UNANIMOUS -- (AFCA, AP-1, FWAA, TSN, WCFF, CBS, CFN, ESPN, PFW, Rivals.com, Scout.com, SI)
- Von Miller, Texas A&M -- CONSENSUS -- (AP-1, WCFF, ESPN, PFW, Scout.com)
- Vontaze Burfict, Arizona State (TSN)
- Tank Carder, TCU (AFCA, ESPN, AP-2)
- Lavonte David, Nebraska (CBS, Rivals.com, AP-2)
- Mason Foster, Washington (CFN, Rivals.com, Scout.com, AP-3)
- Justin Houston, Georgia (FWAA, PFW, AP-2, WCFF-2, Scout.com-2)
- Nate Irving, North Carolina State (Scout.com, SI, WCFF-2, AP-3)
- Danny Trevathan, Kentucky (CFN)
- Akeem Ayers, UCLA (WCFF-2, AP-3)
- Archie Donald, Toledo (Scout.com-2)
- Casey Matthews, Oregon (Scout.com-2)
- Shayne Skov, Stanford (Scout.com-2)

=== Cornerback ===
- Prince Amukamara, Nebraska -- UNANIMOUS -- (AFCA, AP-1, FWAA, TSN, WCFF, CBS, ESPN, PFW, Rivals.com Scout.com, SI)
- Patrick Peterson, LSU -- UNANIMOUS -- (AFCA, AP-1, FWAA, TSN, WCFF, CBS, CFN, ESPN, PFW, Rivals.com, Scout.com, SI)
- Chimdi Chekwa, Ohio State (FWAA, CFN, WCFF-2)
- Jayron Hosley, Virginia Tech (WCFF, Scout.com, AP-2)
- Reggie Rembert, Air Force (AFCA, AP-3)
- Cliff Harris, Oregon (Scout.com, AP-2, WCFF-2)
- Stephon Gilmore, South Carolina (AP-3)
- Prentiss Waggner, Tennessee (Scout.com-2)

=== Safety ===
- Quinton Carter, Oklahoma -- CONSENSUS -- (AFCA, AP-1, ESPN, SI, WCFF-2, Scout.com-2)
- Tejay Johnson, TCU -- CONSENSUS -- (AP-1, WCFF, CBS, ESPN, Rivals.com, SI)
- Mark Barron, Alabama (FWAA, AP-2, Scout.com-2)
- Rahim Moore, UCLA (TSN, AP-3)
- Robert Sands, West Virginia (TSN)
- Ahmad Black, Florida (CBS, CFN, Rivals.com, AP-2)
- Eric Hagg, Nebraska (PFW, AP-3)
- Jaiquawn Jarrett, Temple (PFW)
- Robert Lester, Alabama (WCFF-2, Scout.com-2)

== Special teams ==
=== Kicker ===
- Josh Jasper, LSU -- CONSENSUS -- (FWAA, TSN)
- Danny Hrapmann, Southern Mississippi (WCFF, AP-3, Scout.com-2)
- Alex Henery, Nebraska (AP-1, CBS, CFN, ESPN, PFW, Rivals.com, SI)
- Will Snyderwine, Duke (AFCA, WCFF-2)
- Dan Bailey, Oklahoma State (Scout.com, AP-2)

=== Punter ===
- Chas Henry, Florida -- CONSENSUS -- (AP-1, TSN, WCFF, CBS, CFN, ESPN, Rivals.com, Scout.com, SI)
- Kyle Martens, Rice (AFCA, WCFF-2, AP-3)
- Quinn Sharp, Oklahoma State (FWAA)
- Drew Butler, Georgia (PFW, AP-2)
- Trevor Hankins, Arizona State (Scout.com-2)

=== All-purpose / return specialist ===
- Cliff Harris, Oregon -- CONSENSUS -- (FWAA, TSN, CBS, ESPN, PFW, Rivals.com, SI, WCFF-2)
- Eric Page, Toledo -- CONSENSUS -- (TSN, WCFF)
- Randall Cobb, Kentucky (AP-1, ESPN, SI)
- Owen Marecic, Stanford (AFCA)
- Shaky Smithson, Utah (WCFF, CFN, Scout.com)
- Patrick Peterson, LSU (CBS, PFW)
- Jeremy Kerley, TCU (Rivals.com)
- William Powell, Kansas State (CFN)
- Damaris Johnson, Tulsa (AP-2)
- Denard Robinson, Michigan (AP-3)
- D. J. Beshears, Kansas (Scout.com-2)

== See also ==
- 2010 All-Big 12 Conference football team
- 2010 All-Big Ten Conference football team
- 2010 All-Pacific-10 Conference football team
- 2010 All-SEC football team
