= Lance Kendricks =

American football player (born 1988)

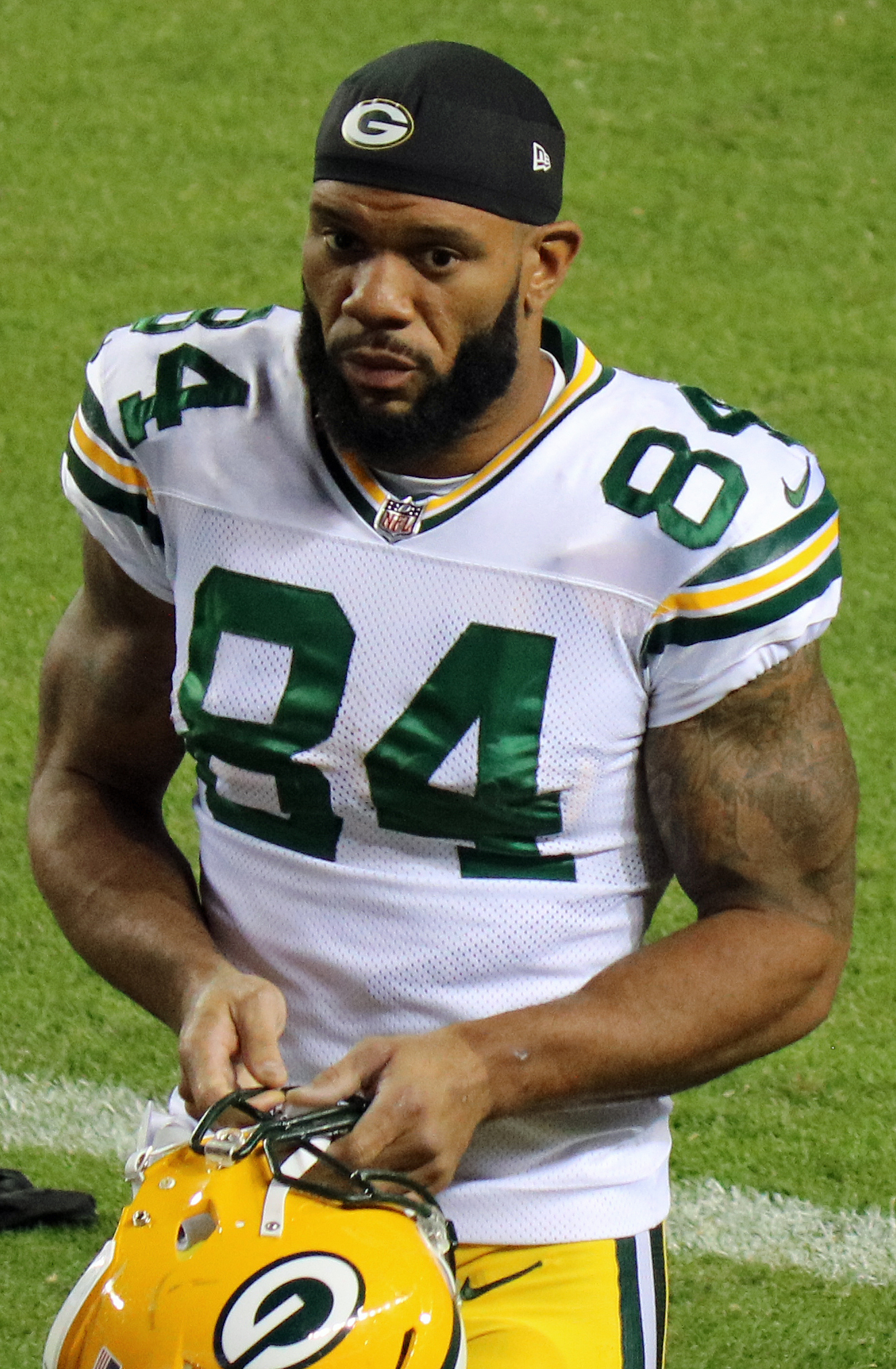
- Kendricks with the Green Bay Packers in 2017

No. 88, 84, 87
- Position: Tight end

Personal information
- Born: January 30, 1988 (age 38); Milwaukee, Wisconsin, U.S.
- Listed height: 6 ft 3 in (1.91 m)
- Listed weight: 250 lb (113 kg)

Career information
- High school: Rufus King (Milwaukee)
- College: Wisconsin (2006–2010)
- NFL draft: 2011: 2nd round, 47th overall pick

Career history
- St. Louis / Los Angeles Rams (2011–2016); Green Bay Packers (2017–2018); New England Patriots (2019); Los Angeles Chargers (2019)

Awards and highlights
- Consensus All-American (2010); First-team All-Big Ten (2010)

Career NFL statistics
- Receptions: 244
- Receiving yards: 2,555
- Receiving touchdowns: 19
- Stats at Pro Football Reference

Lance Ronnie Kendricks (born January 30, 1988) is an American former professional football player who was a tight end in the National Football League (NFL). He played college football for the Wisconsin Badgers, earning consensus All-American honors in 2010. He was selected by the St. Louis Rams in the second round of the 2011 NFL draft.

== Early life ==
Kendricks was born in Milwaukee, Wisconsin. He attended Rufus King International Baccalaureate High School in Milwaukee, where he played for the Rufus King Generals football and basketball teams. In football, he was a two-time all-city selection, the Generals' most valuable player (MVP) as a junior and senior, and the team captain as a senior. He caught 42 passes for 640 yards as a senior and totaled 102 receptions for 1,905 yards during his high school career. He was also a member of the Generals track and field team, where he was one of the state's top performers in the jumping events. He was a four-time AAU triple jump champion. At the WIAA Division 1 State Championship, he finished third in the triple jump as a sophomore and second as a junior.

== College career ==
Kendricks attended the University of Wisconsin–Madison, where he played on the Wisconsin Badgers football team from 2007 to 2010. As a senior in 2010, he was a finalist for the John Mackey Award, received first-team All-Big Ten honors, and was recognized as a consensus first-team All-American.

Kendricks also competed for the Badgers track team in 2007. At the Big Ten Indoor Championships, he placed 12th in the triple jump. He also participated in the long jump event at the Big Ten Conference, where he took 21st.

== Professional career ==
External videos
- Kendricks' NFL Combine workout

Pre-draft measurables
Height	Weight	Arm length	Hand span	Wingspan	40-yard dash	10-yard split	20-yard split	20-yard shuttle	Three-cone drill	Vertical jump	Broad jump	Bench press	Wonderlic
6 ft 2 7/8 in (1.90 m)	243 lb (110 kg)	32 in (0.81 m)	9 5/8 in (0.24 m)	6 ft 5 1/8 in (1.96 m)	4.57 s	1.56 s	2.64 s	4.15 s	6.94 s	38.5 in (0.98 m)	10 ft 2 in (3.10 m)	25 reps	21
All values are from NFL Combine/Pro Day

=== St. Louis / Los Angeles Rams ===
The St. Louis Rams selected Kendricks in the second round (47th overall) of the 2011 NFL draft.

External videos
- Kendricks gets drafted by St. Louis
- Lance Kendricks's NFL Draft Vignette

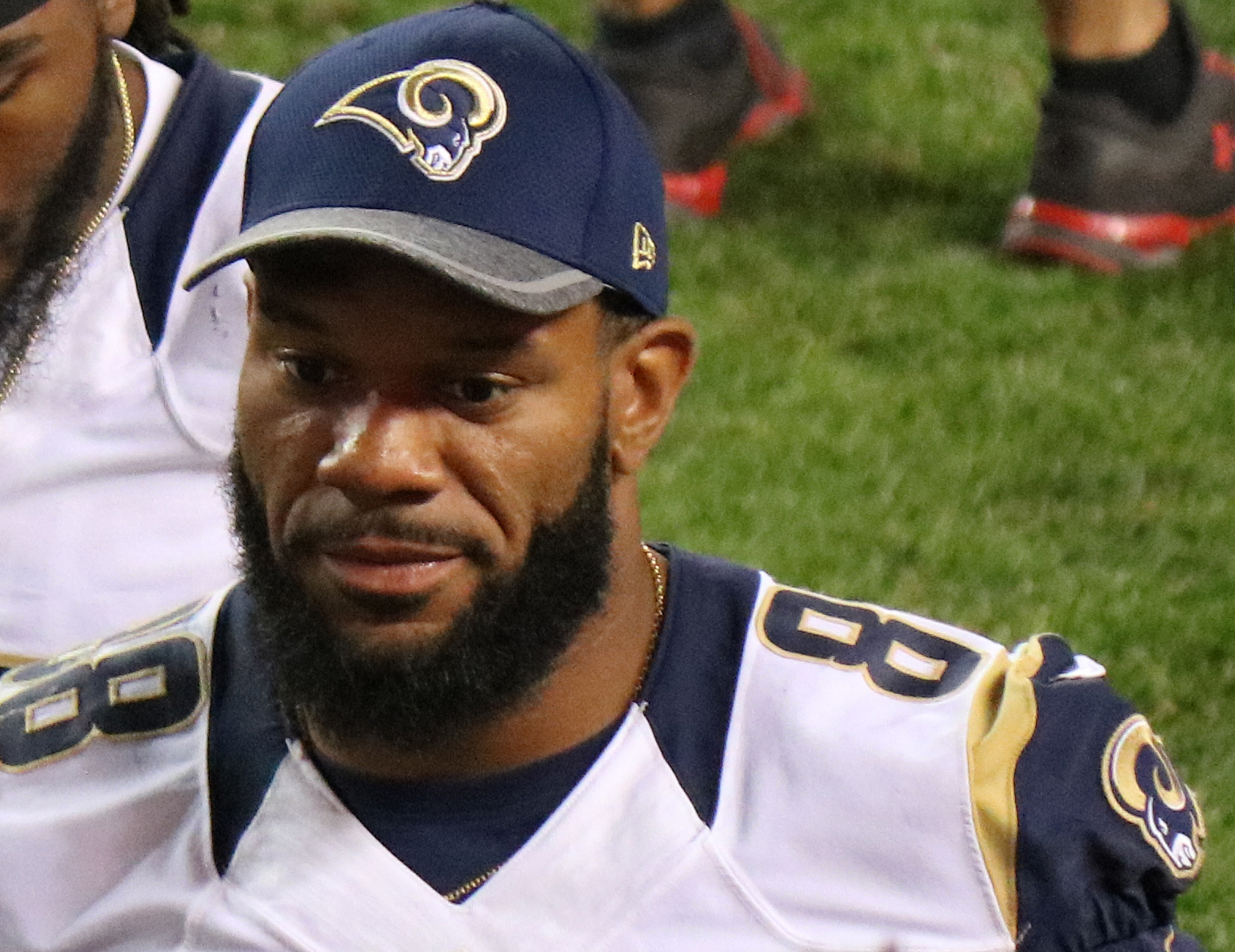
Kendricks with the Rams in 2016

On June 29, 2011, he signed a contract with the Rams. He made his NFL debut on September 11, 2011, catching one pass for 18 yards against the Philadelphia Eagles. On October 4, 2012, he recorded his first career touchdown on a 7-yard pass from Sam Bradford against the Arizona Cardinals. On March 11, 2015, the Rams signed Kendricks to a four-year, $18.5 million contract extension that included $10 million guaranteed. However, he was released by the Rams on March 10, 2017.

=== Green Bay Packers ===
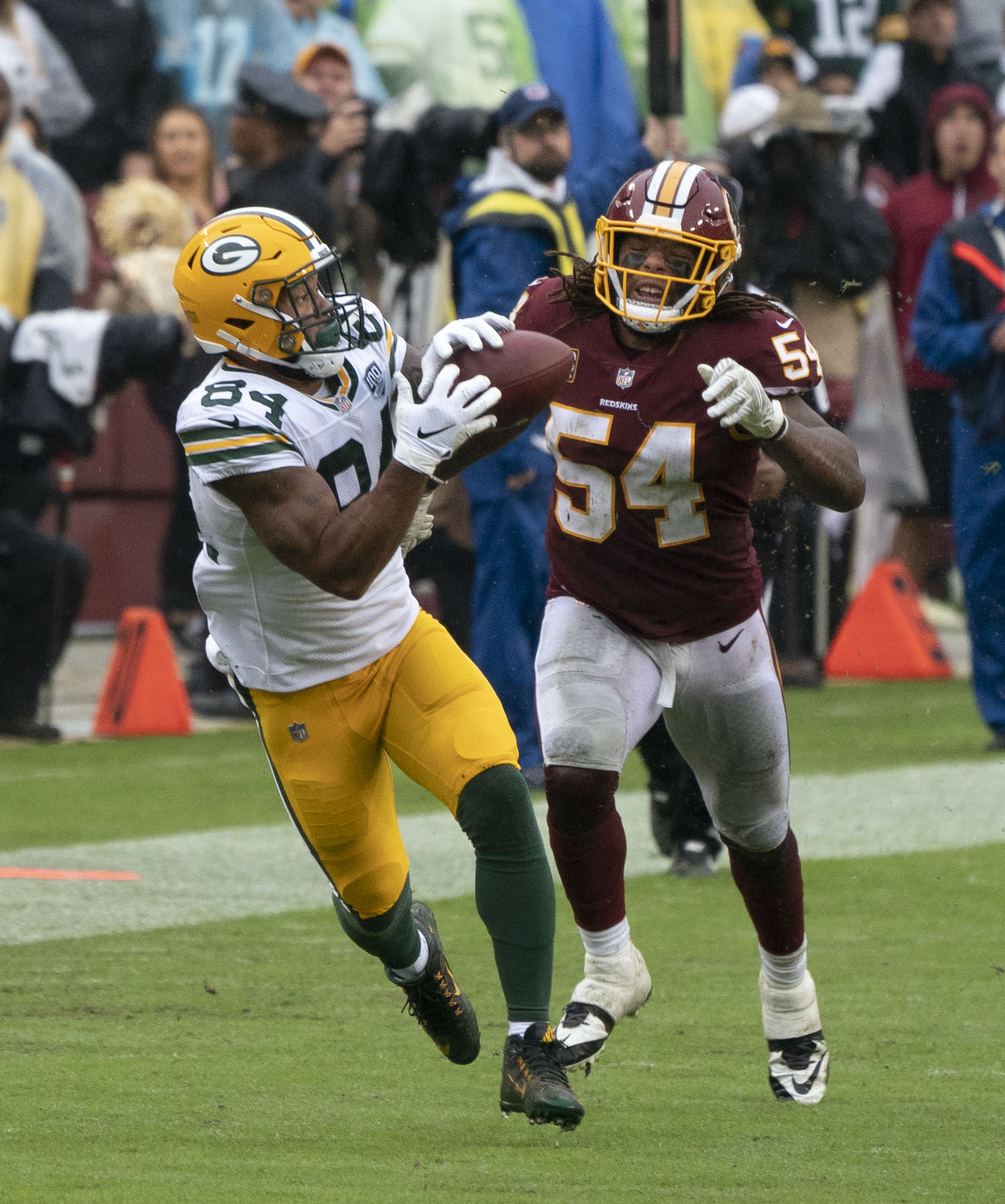
Kendricks in a game against Mason Foster and the Washington Redskins

On March 11, 2017, the Green Bay Packers signed Kendricks to a two-year, $4 million contract that included a $1.2 million signing bonus. On September 10, 2017, in his Packers debut, he had 2 receptions for 18 yards against the Seattle Seahawks. On September 24, 2017, Kendricks caught his first touchdown with the Packers on a 1 yard pass from quarterback Aaron Rodgers in a 27–24 win over the Cincinnati Bengals. On October 7, 2018, he caught his first touchdown of the 2018 season from Rodgers in a 31–23 loss to the Detroit Lions.

=== New England Patriots ===
On July 24, 2019, Kendricks was signed by the New England Patriots. He was suspended the first game of the season for violating the league's policy on substances of abuse following a marijuana possession citation. He was released from the Patriots on September 9, 2019.

=== Los Angeles Chargers ===
On September 17, 2019, Kendricks was signed by the Los Angeles Chargers.

== Career statistics ==
=== NFL ===
Year	Team	Games		Receiving					Fumbles	
Year	Team	G	GS	Rec	Yds	Avg	Lng	TD	FUM	Lost
2011	STL	15	10	28	352	12.6	45	0	1	1
2012	STL	16	14	42	519	12.4	80	4	1	0
2013	STL	15	13	32	258	8.1	21	4	0	0
2014	STL	16	14	27	259	9.6	23	5	0	0
2015	STL	15	12	25	245	9.8	37	2	0	0
2016	LA	16	16	50	499	10.0	44	2	1	1
2017	GB	16	9	18	203	11.3	51	1	0	0
2018	GB	16	3	19	170	10.6	22	1	0	0
Total		125	91	241	2,505	10.4	80	19	3	2
Source: NFL.com

=== College ===
Year	Team	Games		Receiving					Rushing				
Year	Team	G	GS	Rec	Yds	Avg	Lng	TD	Att	Yds	Avg	Lng	TD
2007	Wisconsin	1	0	0	0	0.0	0	0	0	0	0.0	0	0
2008	Wisconsin	8	0	6	141	23.5	36	0	0	0	0.0	0	0
2009	Wisconsin	13	9	29	356	12.3	37	3	7	102	14.6	54	0
2010	Wisconsin	13	11	43	663	15.4	34	5	2	−10	−5.0	0	0
Total		35	20	78	1,160	14.9	37	8	9	92	10.2	54	0
Source: UWBadgers.com

== Personal life ==
Kendricks was stopped for a speeding violation in the early morning hours of September 2, 2017, while heading back to Green Bay from a Wisconsin Badgers football game. He was let go with a warning, but a citation for marijuana possession was issued in December 2017 as a result of a search during the traffic stop. The citation was dismissed in October 2018 but later that month, Kendricks was charged with misdemeanor marijuana possession. In January 2019, an attorney for Kendricks entered a not guilty plea on his behalf. Kendricks later pled no contest and was sentenced to six months probation, with the charge to be dropped if eight hours of community service was completed.
