= John Moffitt (American football) =

American football player (born 1986)

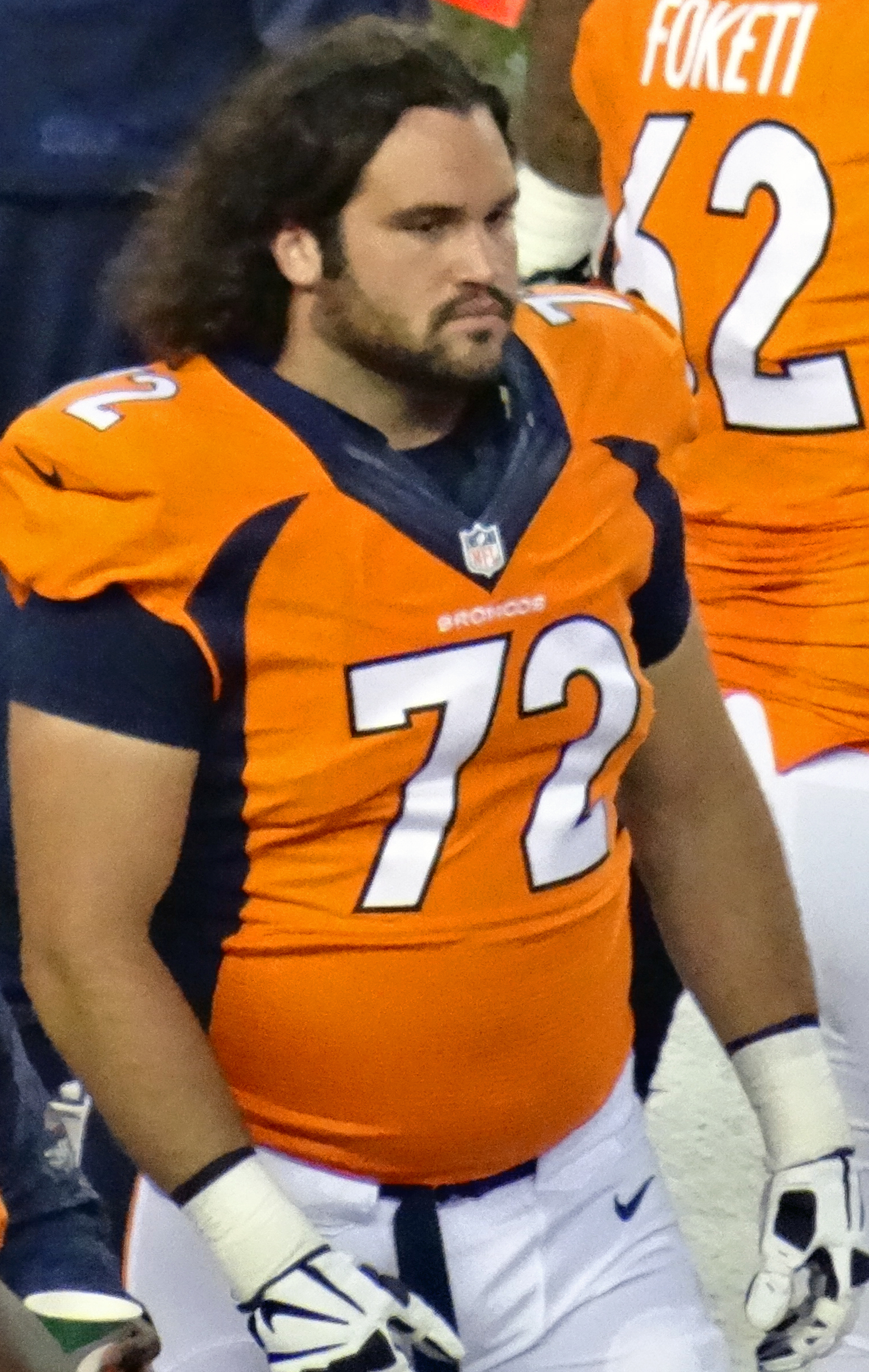
- Moffitt with the Denver Broncos in 2013

No. 74, 72
- Position: Offensive guard

Personal information
- Born: October 28, 1986 (age 40); Guilford, Connecticut, U.S.
- Listed height: 6 ft 4 in (1.93 m)
- Listed weight: 319 lb (145 kg)

Career information
- High school: West Haven (CT) Notre Dame
- College: Wisconsin
- NFL draft: 2011: 3rd round, 75th overall pick

Career history
- Seattle Seahawks (2011−2012); Denver Broncos (2013); Philadelphia Eagles (2015)*
- * Offseason or practice squad member only

Awards and highlights
- First-team All-American (2010); 2× First-team All-Big Ten (2009, 2010)

Career NFL statistics
- Games played: 19
- Games started: 15
- Stats at Pro Football Reference

John James Moffitt (born October 28, 1986) is an American former professional football player who was an offensive guard in the National Football League (NFL). He was selected by the Seattle Seahawks in the third round of the 2011 NFL draft. He played college football at the University of Wisconsin. Moffitt was also a member of the Denver Broncos and Philadelphia Eagles.

== Early life ==
Moffitt was born in Guilford, Connecticut. He attended Notre Dame High School in West Haven after transferring from Guilford High School. As a senior, he was named to the Register All-State football team, recording 65 tackles and seven sacks.Kahn, Mike (April 29, 2011). "Guilford's John Moffitt selected by Seahawks in 3rd round". New Haven Register.

In 2005, as a junior, Moffitt won the Connecticut State Weightlifting Championship, reportedly bench-pressing over 350 pounds and squatting 525 pounds."Center of Aggression: Moffitt's been dropping the hammer since high school". New Haven Register. January 1, 2011.

== College career ==
Moffitt was a 2010 All-American selection by Associated Press, CBSSports.com, and Rivals.com at the University of Wisconsin.

While some have heralded John's ability to run block, many red flags have been raised about his pass blocking skills. According to sidelinescouting.com, Moffitt is "not very fast" and "lacks real quickness", raising questions about his longevity as an American football guard or center.

== Professional career ==
Pre-draft measurables
Height	Weight	Arm length	Hand span	Wingspan	40-yard dash	10-yard split	20-yard split	20-yard shuttle	Three-cone drill	Vertical jump	Broad jump	Bench press
6 ft 4 1/4 in (1.94 m)	319 lb (145 kg)	33 in (0.84 m)	9 1/2 in (0.24 m)	6 ft 4 3/4 in (1.95 m)	5.55 s	1.96 s	3.22 s	4.53 s	7.79 s	30.5 in (0.77 m)	8 ft 6 in (2.59 m)	23 reps
All values from NFL Combine

=== Seattle Seahawks ===
Moffitt was selected number 75 overall by the Seattle Seahawks in the 2011 NFL draft. Moffitt started nine games in the 2011 season before being injured in the week-13 game against the Baltimore Ravens. His career took a further downside when hit with a four-game suspension for using performance-enhancing drugs

Moffitt was traded to the Cleveland Browns on August 19, 2013. On August 20, 2013, the trade was rescinded, reportedly due to Moffitt failing his physical. In an interview with 710 ESPN Seattle, Moffitt claimed that Cleveland wanted him to take less money to play there and when he said he wouldn't do that they told him that they were going to fail his physical.

=== Denver Broncos ===
On August 20, 2013, Moffitt was traded to the Denver Broncos in exchange for defensive tackle Sealver Siliga. Moffitt retired from the NFL on November 5, 2013. He stated that he was unhappy, and did not want to risk his health for money. He was not on the roster when the Broncos made the Super Bowl, the game in which they lost to his former team, the Seahawks. Moffitt said during his retirement that he didn't care about the upcoming Super Bowl anyway.

=== Philadelphia Eagles ===
Moffitt signed a one-year deal with the Eagles on June 29, 2015. He was cut by the Eagles on September 4, 2015.

== Personal life ==
Moffitt, known for his personality and comedic approach to life outside the game hosted radio throughout his collegiate and professional career, appearing on numerous broadcasts as a guest and host including ESPN, KJR (Seattle) and others. Moffitt currently owns a chain of health food cafes in Connecticut.
