= 2011 Rose Bowl =

American college football game

2011 Rose Bowl presented by Vizio
- 97th Rose Bowl Game
Wisconsin Badgers	TCU Horned Frogs
(11–1)	(12–0)
Big Ten	MW
19	21
Head coach: Bret Bielema	Head coach: Gary Patterson
AP / Coaches / BCS; 4 / 4 / 5	AP / Coaches / BCS; 3 / 3 / 3
	1	2	3	4	Total
Wisconsin	10	3	0	6	19
TCU	14	0	7	0	21
- Date: January 1, 2011
- Season: 2010
- Stadium: Rose Bowl
- Location: Pasadena, California
- MVP: Offensive: Andy Dalton (QB, TCU); Defensive: Tank Carder (LB, TCU)
- Favorite: Wisconsin by 3
- National anthem: TCU Horned Frog Marching Band
- Referee: Steve Shaw (SEC)
- Halftime show: TCU Horned Frog Marching Band; University of Wisconsin Marching Band
- Attendance: 94,118
- Payout: US$21.2 million per team

United States TV coverage
- Network: ESPN and ESPN Radio
- Announcers: Brent Musburger (play-by-play); Kirk Herbstreit (analyst); Erin Andrews (sideline)
- Nielsen ratings: 11.7 (20.6 million viewers)

The 2011 Rose Bowl was the 97th edition of the annual bowl game played on January 1, 2011, as part of the 2010 NCAA Division I FBS football season. Played in Pasadena, California, the TCU Horned Frogs of the Mountain West Conference defeated the Wisconsin Badgers of the Big Ten Conference by a score of 21–19. The Pasadena Tournament of Roses Association was the organizer of the game. Vizio Inc. was the corporate sponsor and the game was officially named the Rose Bowl Game presented by Vizio. This game marked the first time a team from a non-Automatic Qualifying Conference won the Rose Bowl since the 1934 game when Columbia beat Stanford 7–0.

The offensive MVP named was TCU senior QB Andy Dalton. The defensive MVP named was TCU junior LB Tank Carder.

The contest was broadcast on cable television station ESPN with a radio broadcast on ESPN Radio and XM Satellite Radio and ESPN3 streaming video over the internet. Coverage began at 1:30 p.m. (PST) with kickoff at 2:10 p.m. (PST). This marked the first time that the game was not broadcast nationally "over-the-air" (terrestrial television) since the games prior to the 1952 Rose Bowl, which was the first nationally televised college football game.

The Rose Bowl Game, themed Building Dreams, Friendships, & Memories, was a contractual sell-out, with 64,500 tickets allocated to the participating teams and conferences. Ticket prices for all seats in the Rose Bowl are listed at $145. The remaining tickets went to the Tournament of Roses members, sponsors, City of Pasadena residents, and the general public. The Rose Bowl stadium capacity is listed at approximately 91,000.

== Pre-game activities ==
The game was presided over by the 2011 Rose Queen and the Royal Court and the grand marshal. Evanne Friedmann of La Cañada High School, located in La Cañada Flintridge, California, was named the 2011 Rose Queen on October 19, 2010. On October 26, 2010, Food Network star Paula Deen was picked as the grand marshal of the Tournament of Roses Parade and Rose Bowl Game, and performed the official coin toss.

After the teams' arrivals in Southern California, the teams participated in the traditional Lawry's Beef Bowl in Beverly Hills and the Disney Media Day (December 26) at Disneyland in nearby Anaheim.

The bands and cheerleaders from both schools participated in the early morning Rose Parade on Colorado Boulevard in Pasadena, California along with the floats representing the two conferences.

On December 30, 2010, Brad Budde (USC), Hayden Fry (Iowa), and Leroy Keyes (Purdue) were inducted into the Rose Bowl Hall of Fame in a ceremony at the Pasadena Convention Center.

The Argonauts of Strike Fighter Squadron VFA-147, based in Lemoore, California, saluted American service men and women by flying over the stadium. They operated the F/A-18 Super Hornet, Navy's premier Strike Fighter.

The Navy Leap Frog Parachute Demonstration Team delivered the game ball and flip coin to Rose Bowl Game President Jeff Throop and special guest Marcus Luttrell, a recipient of a Purple Heart and the Navy Cross for combat heroism and the author of a number-one New York Times bestseller Lone Survivor: The Eyewitness Account of Operation Redwing and the Lost Heroes of SEAL Team 10 (2007) — the story of his heroic service to the U.S. as a U.S. Navy SEAL and his experience in hostile enemy territory. He is the founder of the Lone Survivor Foundation providing support for returning military members and their families.

In support of Luttrell's heroism, the Tournament of Roses recognized The Boot Campaign, an organization that works directly with Luttrell and his foundation to raise awareness for our military by its sale of combat boots purchased and worn by supporters with proceeds benefiting military charities.

== Teams ==
The teams that traditionally play in the Rose Bowl game (since 1947) are the champions of the Pacific Coast Conference, and subsequently Pacific-10, representing the "West" (which was renamed the Pac-12 in 2011 with the addition of the University of Colorado and the University of Utah) and Big Ten conferences, unless one team (or both teams) play in the BCS National Championship Game. Then, according to the BCS rules, the first year the Rose Bowl loses a team to the National Championship Game and a team from the non-automatic qualifying group is an automatic qualifier, that team will play in the Rose Bowl. Should the non-AQ qualify for the BCS Championship, and face either the Big Ten or Pac-10 Champion, the Rose Bowl may replace the Big Ten/Pac-10 Champion with a team from same conference, so long as it is in the Top 14 of the final BCS Standings. The teams, which were based on the final BCS Standings released on December 5, 2010, were selected by the football committee of the Pasadena Tournament of Roses Association.

Since the Pac-10 Champions, the BCS #2 Oregon Ducks, would play in the 2011 BCS National Championship Game, the Rose Bowl was forced to select the non-AQ team, BCS #3 TCU Horned Frogs, to face off against the Big Ten Champion, the BCS #5 Wisconsin Badgers. Consequently, the Pac-10 runner-up, BCS #4 Stanford, went to the Orange Bowl. The two teams' only previous meeting was in the 1970 season opener, when TCU and Wisconsin tied 14–14 in Madison. Both teams practiced at The Home Depot Center (now known as Dignity Health Sports Park) in nearby Carson, California.

=== Wisconsin Badgers ===
Wisconsin started their season by sweeping their nonconference slate, with wins over UNLV in Las Vegas, San Jose State, Arizona State, and Austin Peay at home. However, a loss in their conference opener against Michigan State put a dampener on their season. The Badgers would recover and win seven consecutive games, including a win over then-No. 1 Ohio State and a win in Iowa City over a ranked Iowa squad. Bret Bielema's squad brought in a solid defense that had allowed just 7 rushing touchdowns this season. On the other side of the ball, Wisconsin had 3 running backs with at least 13 touchdowns (John Clay, Montee Ball, and James White) and had the top rushing attack in the Big Ten. Wisconsin QB Scott Tolzien, who led the nation in completion percentage (by completing 74.3% of his passes), played his final game as a Badger.

This was the seventh Rose Bowl appearance for Wisconsin and their first since the 2000 Rose Bowl. It was the ninth consecutive bowl game appearance for Wisconsin. Head coach Bret Bielema also played on the 1990 Iowa Hawkeyes football team that went to the 1991 Rose Bowl.

=== TCU Horned Frogs ===
The Horned Frogs finished the regular season with a perfect 12–0 record, winning eight conference games and the Mountain West Conference title. The game not only marked their first trip to Pasadena but the first by a team from the conference to play in a New Year's Day bowl game. The Frogs had completed their second consecutive perfect regular season, and were making their sixth consecutive bowl appearance. The Rose Bowl was their second consecutive BCS bowl game and the fourth appearance by a Mountain West conference member (the Frogs lost the 2010 Fiesta Bowl to Boise State and Utah played in the 2009 Sugar Bowl and the 2005 Fiesta Bowl, winning both). The team was situated on the West sideline.

TCU finished the regular season as the conference leader in scoring offense (520 points, 43.3 average) and scoring defense (137 points, 11.4 average). TCU came into the game with the nation's #1 ranked defense. The Frogs were led by senior quarterback Andy Dalton, who completed 194 of 293 passes for 2,638 yards for 26 touchdowns, and tailback Ed Wesley, who carried 162 times for 1,065 yards and scored 11 touchdowns. Dalton, playing in his final game as a Horned Frog, led the nation in career wins for an active quarterback at 41. TCU became the fifth team outside of the conference partnership to play in the Rose Bowl game since the formation of the BCS.

== Game summary ==
=== Scoring summary ===
Scoring play	Score
1st quarter
WIS – Philip Welch 30-yard field goal, 10:43	WIS 3–0
TCU – Bart Johnson 23-yard pass from Andy Dalton (Ross Evans kick), 6:55	TCU 7–3
WIS – John Clay 1-yard run (Philip Welch kick), 3:46	WIS 10–7
TCU – Andy Dalton 4-yard run (Ross Evans kick), 0:36	TCU 14–10
2nd quarter
WIS – Philip Welch 37-yard field goal, 0:00	TCU 14–13
3rd quarter
TCU – Luke Shivers 1-yard run (Ross Evans kick), 11:56	TCU 21–13
4th quarter
WIS – Montee Ball 4-yard run (failed 2-point conversion), 2:00	TCU 21–19

=== Statistics ===
Statistics	Wisconsin	TCU
First downs	20	18
Total offense, plays - yards	67–385	49–301
Rushes-yards (net)	46–226	26–82
Passing yards (net)	159	219
Passes, Comp-Att-Int	12–21–0	15–23–0
Time of Possession	36:35	23:25

== Notes ==
- Second game decided by two points, joining the 1966 game (UCLA 14, Michigan State 12).
- Wisconsin head coach Bret Bielema became the eighth person to both play and coach in a Rose Bowl Game.
- The 24 points scored in the first quarter by the two teams were the most in Rose Bowl history and the first time both teams scored in double digits.
- TCU has since moved up to BCS AQ status as a member of the Big 12 Conference. By accepting the Big 12's invitation, they changed their minds about joining the Big East Conference.
