= Lavonte David =

American football player (born 1990)

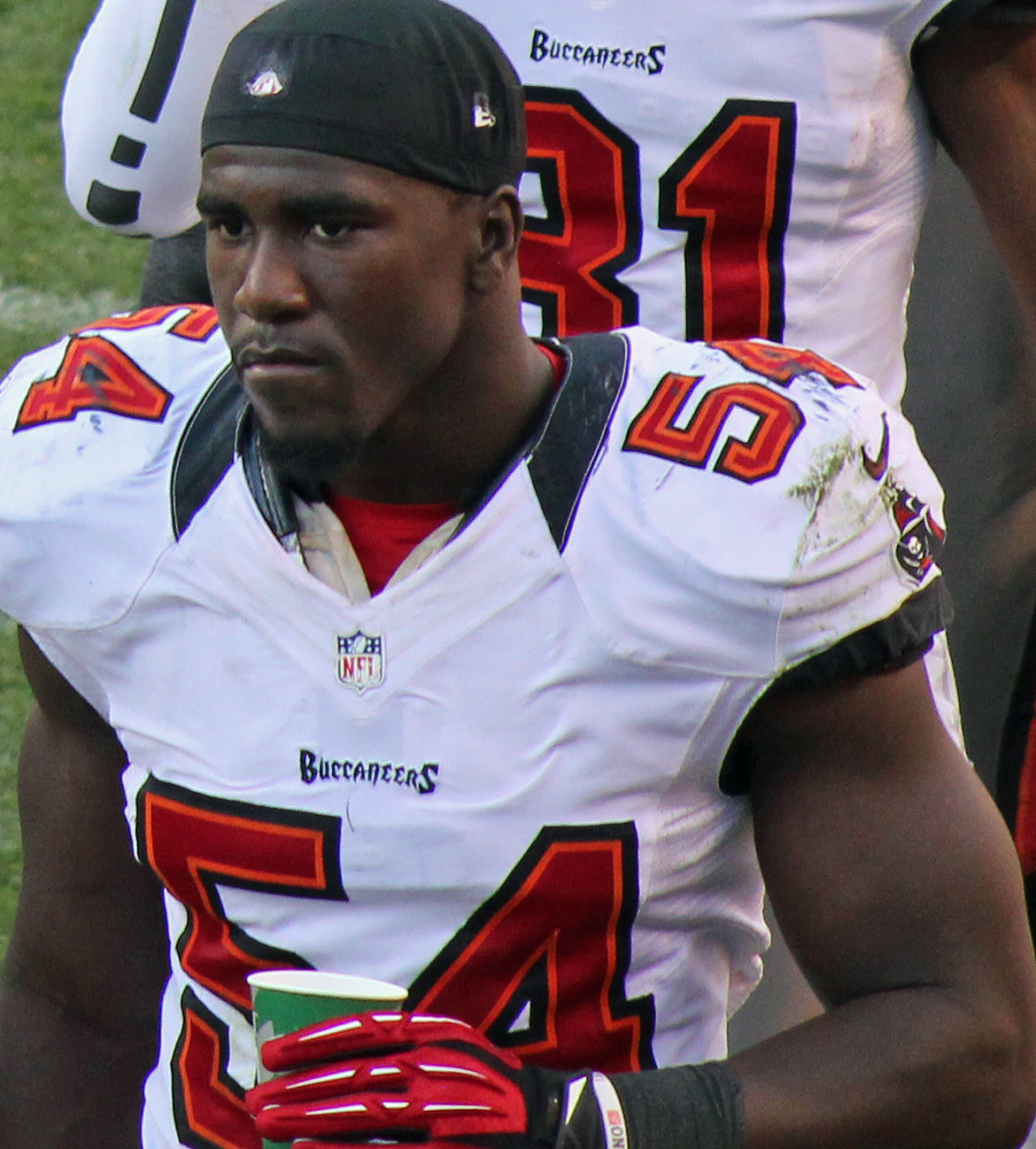
- David with the Tampa Bay Buccaneers in 2012

No. 54
- Position: Linebacker

Personal information
- Born: January 23, 1990 (age 36); Miami, Florida, U.S.
- Listed height: 6 ft 1 in (1.85 m)
- Listed weight: 233 lb (106 kg)

Career information
- High school: Miami Northwestern
- College: Fort Scott CC (2008–2009); Nebraska (2010–2011)
- NFL draft: 2012: 2nd round, 58th overall pick

Career history
- Tampa Bay Buccaneers (2012–2025)

Awards and highlights
- Super Bowl champion (LV); First-team All-Pro (2013); 2× Second-team All-Pro (2016, 2020); Pro Bowl (2015); PFWA All-Rookie Team (2012); NJCAA National Football Championship (2008); 2× First-team All-American (2010, 2011); Big Ten Linebacker of the Year (2011); Big 12 Defensive Newcomer of the Year (2010); First-team All-Big Ten (2011); First-team All-Big 12 (2010)

Career NFL statistics
- Total tackles: 1,716
- Sacks: 42.5
- Forced fumbles: 32
- Fumble recoveries: 21
- Pass deflections: 72
- Interceptions: 14
- Defensive touchdowns: 3
- Stats at Pro Football Reference

Lavonte Lamar David (born January 23, 1990) is an American former professional football player who spent his entire 14-season career as a linebacker with the Tampa Bay Buccaneers of the National Football League (NFL). He played college football for the Nebraska Cornhuskers, twice earning All-American honors, and was selected by the Buccaneers in the second round of the 2012 NFL draft. David was named to three All-Pro teams, one Pro Bowl and won Super Bowl LV during the 2020 season, in a 31–9 victory over the Kansas City Chiefs.

== Early life ==
A native of Miami, Florida, David attended Northwestern High School, where he was a teammate of Marcus Forston, Anthony Gaitor, Jacory Harris, Sean Spence, Tommy Streeter, and Brandon Washington. Northwestern won back-to-back state titles in 2006 and 2007, and was listed as mythical national champions by USA Today in 2007. Regarded as only a two-star prospect by Rivals.com, David was not highly recruited.

== College career ==
David originally signed with Middle Tennessee State University, but then decided to attend Fort Scott Community College in Fort Scott, Kansas. David led Fort Scott to the NJCAA National Football Championship, while ranking among the conference's leaders in tackles and tackles for loss. He was also a two-time first-team All-Jayhawk Conference selection and a Region VI All-American in 2009. David was the defensive most valuable player of the 2009 national championship game against Cam Newton-led Blinn. David racked up 12 tackles, including sacking Newton on the game's final defensive play, before Fort Scott lost on a punt return for a touchdown. During his first season at Fort Scott, David led the Jayhawk Conference with 93 tackles.

In 2010, he transferred to the University of Nebraska–Lincoln, where he set the school's single-season record for tackles with 152, in his first year with the team. In a game against South Dakota State, David recorded a career-high 19 tackles, the seventh- most in school history. After the season, David was named first-team All-American by Rivals.com and CBS, unanimous first-team Big 12 and Big 12 Newcomer of the Year, as selected by the coaches.

As a senior, David led the Cornhuskers with 133 tackles and ranked third in the Big Ten in tackles per game. He also led Nebraska in tackles for loss (13.0), sacks (5.5), interceptions (2), forced fumbles (2) and fumble recoveries (2) in 2011. At the conclusion of the season, he was named First-team All-Big Ten by both the coaches and media. He was also the winner of the inaugural Butkus-Fitzgerald Linebacker of the Year, awarded to the best linebacker in the Big Ten.

David started all 27 games he played in at Nebraska (2010–11), recording 285 tackles, 28 tackles for loss, 11.5 sacks, two interceptions, 12 passes defended, three forced fumbles and two fumbles recovered. His 285 career tackles rank fourth in school history, and most by a two-year player.

In May 2021, in fulfillment of a promise to his late mother, David graduated from the University of Nebraska, receiving his B.S. in Criminology and Criminal Justice.

== Professional career ==
=== Pre-draft ===
David entered the 2012 NFL draft and attended the NFL Scouting Combine in Indianapolis, Indiana. He completed all of the combine and positional drills. Teams spoke about possibly moving him to safety as they thought he was undersized to play linebacker in the NFL. David was projected to be a second or third round pick by Sports Illustrated and NFL draft experts. At the conclusion of the pre-draft process, David was ranked as the third best outside linebacker in the draft by DraftScout.com, was ranked the fourth best outside linebacker prospect by NFL analyst Mike Mayock, and was ranked the tenth best outside linebacker in the draft by Sports Illustrated.

External videos
- Lavonte David's NFL Combine Workout

Pre-draft measurables
Height	Weight	Arm length	Hand span	Wingspan	40-yard dash	10-yard split	20-yard split	20-yard shuttle	Three-cone drill	Vertical jump	Broad jump	Bench press
6 ft 0 5/8 in (1.84 m)	233 lb (106 kg)	31 3/4 in (0.81 m)	8 3/4 in (0.22 m)	6 ft 4 5/8 in (1.95 m)	4.65 s	1.60 s	2.68 s	4.22 s	7.28 s	36.5 in (0.93 m)	9 ft 11 in (3.02 m)	19 reps
All values from NFL Combine

=== 2012 ===
The Tampa Bay Buccaneers selected David in the second round with the 58th overall pick in the 2012 NFL Draft. The Buccaneers traded their third (68th overall) and fourth round (126th overall) pick to the Houston Texans in order to move up to the second round and draft David. In exchange, the Buccaneers received the Texans' second and seventh round (233rd overall) picks in 2012. He was the ninth linebacker drafted in 2012 and also became the highest drafted linebacker from Nebraska since Barrett Ruud in 2005, who was also drafted by the Buccaneers.

External videos
- Buccaneers draft Lavonte David 58th overall
- 2012 NFL Draft Profile: Lavonte David

On May 19, 2012, the Buccaneers signed him to a four-year, $3.47 million contract that included $1.36 million guaranteed and a $964,896 signing bonus.

Throughout training camp, David competed to be the starting weakside linebacker against veteran Adam Hayward. He made his NFL debut in the Buccaneers' pre-season opener against at the Miami Dolphins and made two solo tackles, a pass deflection, and his first career interception in their 20–7 victory. He intercepted a pass by Dolphins' quarterback Matt Moore in the second quarter. Head coach Greg Schiano named David the starting weakside linebacker to begin the regular season, alongside Quincy Black and starting middle linebacker Mason Foster.

David made his professional regular season debut and first career start in the season-opener against the Carolina Panthers and made six combined tackles in their 16–10 victory. He immediately performed well and displayed great play recognition and instincts. Defensive coordinator Bill Sheridan chose to give David the responsibility of wearing the green-dot helmet transmitter, in order to communicate with staff and making defensive calls. On November 4, 2012, he collected a season-high 16 combined tackles (14 solo) in the Buccaneers' 42–32 win at the Oakland Raiders in Week 9. He earned Defensive Rookie of the Month in November and became the first member of the Buccaneers to win the award after amassing a league-leading 47 combined tackles in four games. On December 2, 2012, David made ten combined tackles (seven solo), a season-high two pass deflections, and made his first career regular season interception during a 31–23 loss at the Denver Broncos in Week 13. He intercepted a pass by Broncos' quarterback Peyton Manning, that was originally intended for tight end Jacob Tamme, and returned it for a 27-yard gain in the third quarter. In Week 14, he recorded nine combined tackles and made his first career sack on quarterback Nick Foles during the third quarter of a 23–21 loss to the Philadelphia Eagles. David started all 16 games at weakside linebacker in 2012 and led the Buccaneers with 139 combined tackles (112 solo), while also making five pass deflections, two sacks, and an interception. His 139 tackles tied for eighth in the league along with linebackers London Fletcher and Paul Posluszny. David also finished with 20 tackles-for-loss, which was the most by a rookie since Kendrell Bell in 2001. He was named to the PFWA All-Rookie Team.

=== 2013 ===
David remained the starting weakside linebacker in 2013, alongside middle linebacker Mason Foster and Dekoda Watson. He started in the Buccaneers' season-opener at the New York Jets and made nine combined tackles, two sacks, and an interception during their 18–17 loss. During the fourth quarter, David delivered a late hit on quarterback Geno Smith as Smith ran out of bounds after a ten-yard gain to stop the clock with 15 seconds left as the Jets were losing 17–15. David received a 15-yard penalty for unnecessary roughness, giving the New York Jets the necessary distance for Nick Folk to make a 48-yard game-winning field goal. David later explained after the game that he thought Smith was going to stay in bounds before he delivered the blow. On September 12, 2013, David was fined $7,875 for his late hit on Smith. On November 11, 2013, David recorded seven combined tackles and earned the first safety of his career in a 22–19 win against the Dolphins in Week 10. He earned the safety after he tackled running back Daniel Thomas in the endzone for a one-yard loss in the second quarter. In Week 12, he collected a season-high 12 combined tackles (nine solo), a pass deflection, and an interception in the Buccaneers' 23–21 victory at the Detroit Lions. He received National Football Conference (NFC) Defensive Player of the Week for his Week 12 performance against the Lions. On December 8, 2013, David made nine combined tackles, two pass deflections, two interceptions, and a sack during a 27–6 win against the Buffalo Bills in Week 14. He had his first multi-interception game of his career after intercepting two passes by E. J. Manuel. He started all 16 games in 2013 and recorded 145 combined tackles (107 solo), ten pass deflections, a career-high seven sacks, five interceptions, two forced fumbles, and a safety.

On December 30, 2013, the Buccaneers fired head coach Greg Schiano and general manager Mark Dominik after the Buccaneers did not qualify for the playoffs and finished with a 4–12 record. January 3, 2014, Lavonte David was named 2013 First-team All-Pro. Pro Football Focus gave David an overall grade of 93.5 in 2013. He was ranked 36th by his fellow players on the NFL Top 100 Players of 2014.

=== 2014 ===
Head coach Lovie Smith named David and Jonathan Casillas the starting outside linebackers to begin the regular season, along with middle linebacker Mason Foster. Defensive coordinator Leslie Frazier retained the base 4-3 defense and ran Lovie Smith's Tampa 2 scheme.

"There's not a lot of players like Derrick Brooks, it's not even fair to compare some guys in that way. But, Lavonte David, he has a chance. He's that younger version coming up. I hear he's a great guy".

— Lovie Smith

On October 2, 2014, David collected a season-high 14 combined tackles (ten solo) and a pass deflection during a 37–31 loss at the New Orleans Saints. The following week, he tied his season-high of 14 combined tackles (ten solo) in the Buccaneers' 48–17 loss to the Baltimore Ravens in Week 6. In Week 8, David collected 14 combined tackles (nine solo), for his third consecutive game, during a 19–13 loss to the Minnesota Vikings. On November 16, 2014, David made 13 combined tackles (eight solo) before exiting in the fourth quarter of a 27–7 victory at the Redskins due to an injury. He was listed as inactive for the next two games (Week 12–13) due to his hamstring injury, which also ended his 42-game streak of consecutive starts. On December 23, 2014, it was announced that David was selected as an alternate to the 2015 Pro Bowl. Unfortunately, David would not play after all of the primary selections participated. He finished the 2014 season with 146 combined tackles (101 solo), a four pass deflections, four forced fumbles, and a sack in 14 games and 14 starts. He was ranked 56th by his fellow players on the NFL Top 100 Players of 2015.

=== 2015 ===
On August 9, 2015, the Buccaneers signed David to a five-year, $50.25 million contract extension with $25.55 million guaranteed.

Head coach Lovie Smith named David and Danny Lansanah the starting outside linebackers to begin the 2015 season, along with rookie middle linebacker Kwon Alexander. On September 27, 2015, David collected a season-high 15 combined tackles (three solo) during a 19–9 loss at the Texans. In Week 11, he made six solo tackles, two pass deflections, two interceptions, and scored his first career touchdown during the Buccaneers' 45–17 victory at the Eagles. David intercepted a screen pass by quarterback Mark Sanchez, that was originally intended for running back Darren Sproles, and returned it for a 20-yard touchdown in the fourth quarter. On December 23, 2015, it was announced that David was selected as an alternate for the 2016 Pro Bowl. He finished the season with a career-high 147 combined tackles (85 solo), 13 pass deflections, three interceptions, three sacks, two forced fumbles, and a touchdown in 16 games and 16 starts. David had the third most tackles among all players in 2015, behind only NaVorro Bowman (154) and D'Qwell Jackson (150). On January 25, 2016, it was announced that David would play in the Pro Bowl and replace DeMarcus Ware, who was unable to attend due to his participation in Super Bowl 50 as part of the Broncos. He was ranked 53rd on the NFL Top 100 Players of 2016.

=== 2016 ===
On January 6, 2016, the Buccaneers fired head coach Lovie Smith after they finished the previous season with a 6–10 record. Ten days later, offensive coordinator Dirk Koetter was promoted to head coach. Koetter chose to replace defensive coordinator Leslie Frazier with former Atlanta Falcons head coach Mike Smith. Koetter named David and Daryl Smith the starting outside linebackers in 2016, along with middle linebacker Kwon Alexander.

On December 4, 2016, David recorded three combined tackles, a season-high two pass deflections, and returned an interception for a touchdown as the Buccaneers defeated the Chargers 28–21. David intercepted a pass by Chargers' quarterback Philip Rivers, that was initially intended for wide receiver Tyrell Williams, and returned it for a 15-yard touchdown in the third quarter. In Week 15, he collected a season-high nine combined tackles during a 26–20 loss at the Dallas Cowboys. David started all 16 games in 2016 and recorded a career-low 87 combined tackles (67 solo), five sacks, four passes defensed, four forced fumbles, one interception, and a touchdown. David struggled in his first year under defensive coordinator Mike Smith's new scheme and received an overall grade of 77.6 from Pro Football Focus in 2016.

=== 2017 ===
Head coach Dirk Koetter officially named David and Kendell Beckwith the starting outside linebackers, along with middle linebacker Kwon Alexander. In Week 2, David made nine combined tackles and recovered a fumble by quarterback Mike Glennon, which set up the Buccaneers on an eventual touchdown scoring drive in their 29–7 victory against the Chicago Bears. On September 24, 2017, David made seven combined tackles before he was carted off the field in the third quarter of the Buccaneers' 34–17 win at the Vikings in Week 3. In Week 7, he collected a season-high 14 combined tackles (12 solo) in a 30–27 loss at the Bills. David was inactive for the Buccaneers' Week 15 loss to the Atlanta Falcons due to a hamstring injury. He finished the 2017 season with 101 combined tackles (76 solo), five forced fumbles, and a pass deflection in 13 games and 13 starts. Pro Football Focus gave David an overall grade of 94.2, which ranked second among all qualified linebackers in 2017.

=== 2018 ===
In Week 7 against the Cleveland Browns, David recorded a team-high eight tackles and forced a fumble on rookie quarterback Baker Mayfield during the 26–23 overtime win. In Week 13 against the Panthers, David recorded a season-high 12 tackles and his first full sack of the season on Cam Newton during the 24–17 win. In Week 15 against the Ravens, David matched his season-high 12 tackles, sacked rookie quarterback Lamar Jackson twice, and recovered a fumble lost by Jackson during the 20–12 loss. David finished the season with 120 combined tackles (94 solo), 3.5 sacks, one forced fumble, two fumble recoveries, and two pass deflections in 14 games started.

=== 2019 ===
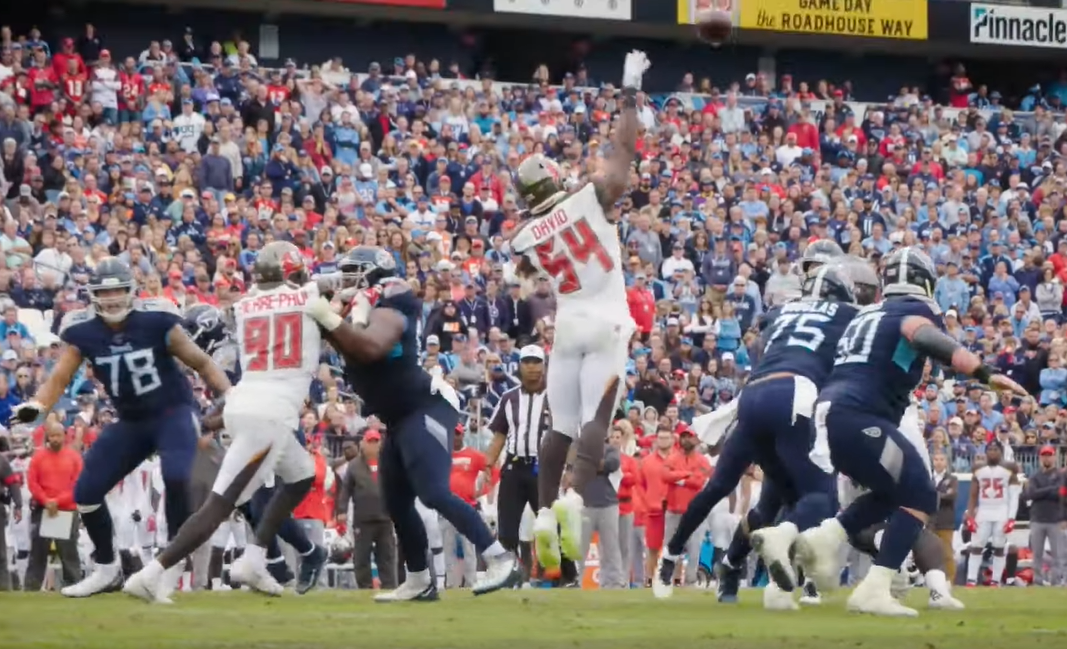
David (#54) in a game against the Tennessee Titans

In Week 4 against the Los Angeles Rams, David recorded an interception off Jared Goff in the 55–40 win. This was David's first interception since the 2016 season. In Week 8 against the Tennessee Titans, David recorded a season high 12 tackles during the 27–23 loss. In the following week's game against the Seattle Seahawks, David recorded eight tackles and his first and only sack of the season on Russell Wilson during the 40–34 overtime loss. In Week 10 against the Arizona Cardinals, David recorded a team-high eight tackles and forced a fumble on running back David Johnson which he recovered in the 30–27 win. David finished the season with 122 combined tackles (81 solo), one sack, three forced fumbles, one fumble recovery, seven pass deflections, and an interception in 16 games started. He was ranked 100th by his fellow players on the NFL Top 100 Players of 2020.

=== 2020 ===
In Week 3, during a 28–10 win against the Broncos, David recorded four total tackles and his first interception of the season. He was named the NFC Defensive Player of the Month for his performance in September (24 total tackles, two pass deflections, a forced fumble, a fumble recovery, and one interception from Weeks 1–3). Overall, in the 2020 season, David recorded 117 total tackles, 1.5 sacks, 12 tackles for loss, three forced fumbles, one interception, and six defended passes.

In the Wild Card Round of the playoffs against the Washington Football Team, David led the team with nine tackles and sacked Taylor Heinicke once during the 31–23 road victory. In Super Bowl LV, David recorded six tackles and helped the Buccaneers defeat the Kansas City Chiefs 31–9 to give David his first Super Bowl ring.

=== 2021 ===
On March 12, 2021, David signed a two-year, $25 million contract extension with the Buccaneers with $20 million guaranteed. On September 18, David was fined $12,875 for spiking his helmet during the season opener against the Cowboys. He suffered a foot injury in Week 15 and was placed on injured reserve on December 23, 2021. He was activated on January 15, 2022, in time for the Wild Card Round against the Eagles.

=== 2022 ===
David finished the 2022 season with three sacks, 124 total tackles, five passes defended, and one forced fumble.

=== 2023 ===
On March 23, 2023, David re-signed with the Buccaneers on a one-year, $7 million contract. David was ranked 99th by his fellow players on the NFL Top 100 Players of 2024.

=== 2024 ===
On March 12, 2024, David re-signed with the Buccaneers on a one-year contract worth up to $10 million. He started all 17 games, recording a team-leading 122 tackles, 5.5 sacks, six passes defensed, and three forced fumbles. He was ranked 96th by his fellow players on the NFL Top 100 Players of 2025.

=== 2025 ===
On March 7, 2025, David re-signed with the Buccaneers on a one-year deal. In Week 5, he had an interception off of Sam Darnold late in a game against the Seattle Seahawks. This proved to be a game changer, as the Buccaneers won the game 38–35 thanks to a 39-yard field goal from Chase McLaughlin. He finished the 2025 season with 3.5 sacks, 114 tackles (61 solo), one interception, three passes defended, two forced fumbles, and two fumble recoveries.

On March 24, 2026, David announced his retirement from professional football.

== NFL career statistics ==
Legend
	Won the Super Bowl
	Led the league
**Bold**	Career high

=== Regular season ===
Year	Team	Games		Tackles					Interceptions						Fumbles			
Year	Team	GP	GS	Cmb	Solo	Ast	Sck	TFL	PD	Int	Yds	Avg	Lng	TD	FF	FR	Yds	TD
2012	TB	16	16	139	**112**	27	2.0	20	4	1	27	**27.0**	27	0	0	0	0	0
2013	TB	16	16	145	107	38	**7.0**	**21**	10	**5**	**87**	17.4	**32**	0	2	1	0	0
2014	TB	14	14	146	101	45	1.0	17	4	0	0	0.0	0	0	4	1	0	0
2015	TB	16	16	**147**	85	**62**	3.0	10	**13**	3	19	6.3	20T	**1**	2	2	0	0
2016	TB	16	16	87	67	20	5.0	17	4	1	15	15.0	15	**1**	4	2	**53**	0
2017	TB	13	13	101	76	25	0.0	8	1	0	0	0.0	0	0	**5**	**5**	21	**1**
2018	TB	14	14	120	94	26	3.5	13	2	0	0	0.0	0	0	1	2	0	0
2019	TB	16	16	123	82	41	1.0	10	7	1	26	26.0	26	0	3	1	0	0
2020	TB	16	16	117	82	35	1.5	12	6	1	−5	−5.0	−5	0	3	2	0	0
2021	TB	12	12	97	63	34	2.0	5	3	0	0	0.0	0	0	2	1	12	0
2022	TB	17	17	124	80	44	3.0	10	5	0	0	0.0	0	0	1	1	0	0
2023	TB	15	15	134	86	48	4.5	17	5	0	0	0.0	0	0	1	0	0	0
2024	TB	17	17	122	76	46	5.5	9	6	1	7	7.0	7	0	3	1	0	0
2025	TB	17	17	114	61	53	3.5	8	3	1	3	3.0	3	0	2	2	0	0
Career		215	215	1,716	1,172	544	42.5	176	73	14	179	12.7	32	2	33	21	86	1

=== Postseason ===
Year	Team	Games		Tackles					Interceptions						Fumbles			
Year	Team	GP	GS	Cmb	Solo	Ast	Sck	TFL	PD	Int	Yds	Avg	Lng	TD	FF	FR	Yds	TD
2020	TB	4	4	**26**	**22**	4	**1.0**	1	**4**	0	0	0.0	0	0	0	0	0	0
2021	TB	2	2	13	9	4	0.0	1	0	0	0	0.0	0	0	0	**1**	0	0
2022	TB	1	1	14	9	**5**	0.0	0	0	0	0	0.0	0	0	0	0	0	0
2023	TB	2	2	18	14	4	**1.0**	**4**	0	0	0	0.0	0	0	**1**	0	0	0
2024	TB	1	1	8	3	**5**	**1.0**	0	0	0	0	0.0	0	0	0	0	0	0
Career		10	10	79	57	22	3.0	6	4	0	0	0.0	0	0	1	1	0	0

== Career highlights ==
=== Awards and honors ===
NFL

- Super Bowl champion (LV)
- First-team All-Pro (2013)
- 2× Second-team All-Pro (2016, 2020)
- Pro Bowl (2015)
- PFWA All-Rookie Team (2012)
- 7× NFL Top 100 — 35th (2014), 56th (2015), 53rd (2016), 100th (2020), 43rd (2021), 99th (2024), 96th (2025)

College

- 2× First-team All-American (2010, 2011)
- Big Ten Linebacker of the Year (2011)
- Big 12 Defensive Newcomer of the Year (2010)
- First-team All-Big Ten (2011)
- First-team All-Big 12 (2010)

=== Buccaneers franchise records ===
- Most combined tackles in a career – 1,716
- Most assisted tackles in a career – 544
- Most tackles for loss in a career – 176
- Most forced fumbles in a career – 33
- Most fumble recoveries in a career – 21
- Most assisted tackles in a season – 62 (2015)
- Most tackles for loss in a season – 21 (2013)
- Most fumble recoveries in a season – 5 (2017)

== Personal life ==
While at Nebraska, David volunteered his time with the team to hospital visits and the Husker Heroes program. In December 2012, David led students through football drills and promoted the importance of health and fitness for the opening of BUCS CARE School Fitness Zones at two local Elementary schools. In the same month, the linebacker also visited youth at All Children's Hospital in St. Petersburg and sang holiday carols to residents at Westminster Palms retirement home in December 2012. In June 2012, David visited MacDill Air Force Base in Downtown Tampa to tour a hurricane aircraft, witness a military dog training session, and thank civilian workers and active duty military for their service. In 2020, David was chosen as the Buccaneers' nominee for the 2020 Art Rooney Sportsmanship Award.
