= Anthony Gaitor =

American football player (born 1988)

No. 24, 26
- Position: Cornerback

Personal information
- Born: October 9, 1988 (age 38); Miami, Florida, U.S.
- Listed height: 5 ft 10 in (1.78 m)
- Listed weight: 185 lb (84 kg)

Career information
- High school: Miami Northwestern
- College: FIU
- NFL draft: 2011: 7th round, 222nd overall pick

Career history
- Tampa Bay Buccaneers (2011–2013); Miami Dolphins (2014)*; Tampa Bay Buccaneers (2014)*; Arizona Cardinals (2014)*; BC Lions (2016); New Orleans Saints (2017)*; BC Lions (2017); Winnipeg Blue Bombers (2018–2019); As a coach: FIU (2022–present)
- * Offseason or practice squad member only

Awards and highlights
- Grey Cup champion (2019); First-team All-Sun Belt (2010)

Career NFL statistics
- Total tackles: 12
- Pass deflections: 4
- Stats at Pro Football Reference
- Stats at CFL.ca

Anthony Gaitor (born October 9, 1988) is an American former professional football player who was a cornerback in the National Football League (NFL) and Canadian Football League (CFL). He was selected by the Tampa Bay Buccaneers in the seventh round of the 2011 NFL draft. He played college football for the FIU Panthers.

== Early life ==
A native of Miami, Gaitor attended Miami Northwestern High School, where he played on a squad that included other future NFL players: Lavonte David, Marcus Forston, Jacory Harris, Tommy Streeter, Sean Spence, and Brandon Washington. Regarded as only a two-star recruit by Rivals.com, Gaitor was not listed among the top cornerbacks of his class.

== College career ==
Gaitor attended Florida International University from 2007 to 2010. In his career, he accumulated 197 total tackles, including 19 for loss, four sacks, 11 interceptions (three which he returned for touchdowns), and 35 passes defended.

== Professional career ==
Pre-draft measurables
Height	Weight	40-yard dash	10-yard split	20-yard split	20-yard shuttle	Three-cone drill	Vertical jump	Broad jump	Bench press
5 ft 9 7/8 in (1.77 m)	177 lb (80 kg)	4.48 s	1.56 s	2.55 s	4.12 s	6.85 s	36.0 in (0.91 m)	10 ft 6 in (3.20 m)	12 reps
All values from Pro Day

=== Tampa Bay Buccaneers (first stint) ===
Gaitor was selected by the Tampa Bay Buccaneers in the seventh round, 222nd overall, of the 2011 NFL draft. On August 26, 2013, he was placed on injured-reserve, thus ending his 2013 season.

=== Miami Dolphins ===
Gaitor signed with the Miami Dolphins on May 28, 2014.

=== Tampa Bay Buccaneers (second stint) ===
On July 28, 2014, the Buccaneers re-signed Gaitor. The Buccaneers released Gaitor on August 29, 2014.

=== Arizona Cardinals ===
Gaitor signed with the Arizona Cardinals practice squad on August 31, 2014. On October 28, 2014, he was released from Arizona's practice squad.

=== BC Lions (first stint) ===
Gaitor signed with the BC Lions of the Canadian Football League (CFL) on February 25, 2016, and was released by the team on June 3, 2016. He was recalled July 24, 2016. Gaiter played in 11 games for the Lions in 2016, contributing 35 tackles, 2 interceptions, 1 forced fumble, and 1 defensive touchdown. He was released by the Lions on January 9, 2017, allowing him to pursue an NFL contract.

=== New Orleans Saints ===
Later that same day (January 9, 2017) Gaitor signed a reserve/future contract with the New Orleans Saints. He was waived by the Saints on May 15, 2017.

=== BC Lions (second stint) ===
Gaitor signed with the Lions on May 29, 2017.

=== Winnipeg Blue Bombers ===
Gaitor was signed by the Winnipeg Blue Bombers on February 1, 2018. He left the team in November 2019 after refusing a role change.

== Coaching career ==
Gaitor currently is a defensive quality control assistant for Florida International football. As of late March 2023, Gaitor was promoted to outside linebackers coach for Florida International. He currently serves as the cornerbacks coach at FIU.
