= Kenbrell Thompkins =

American football player (born 1988)

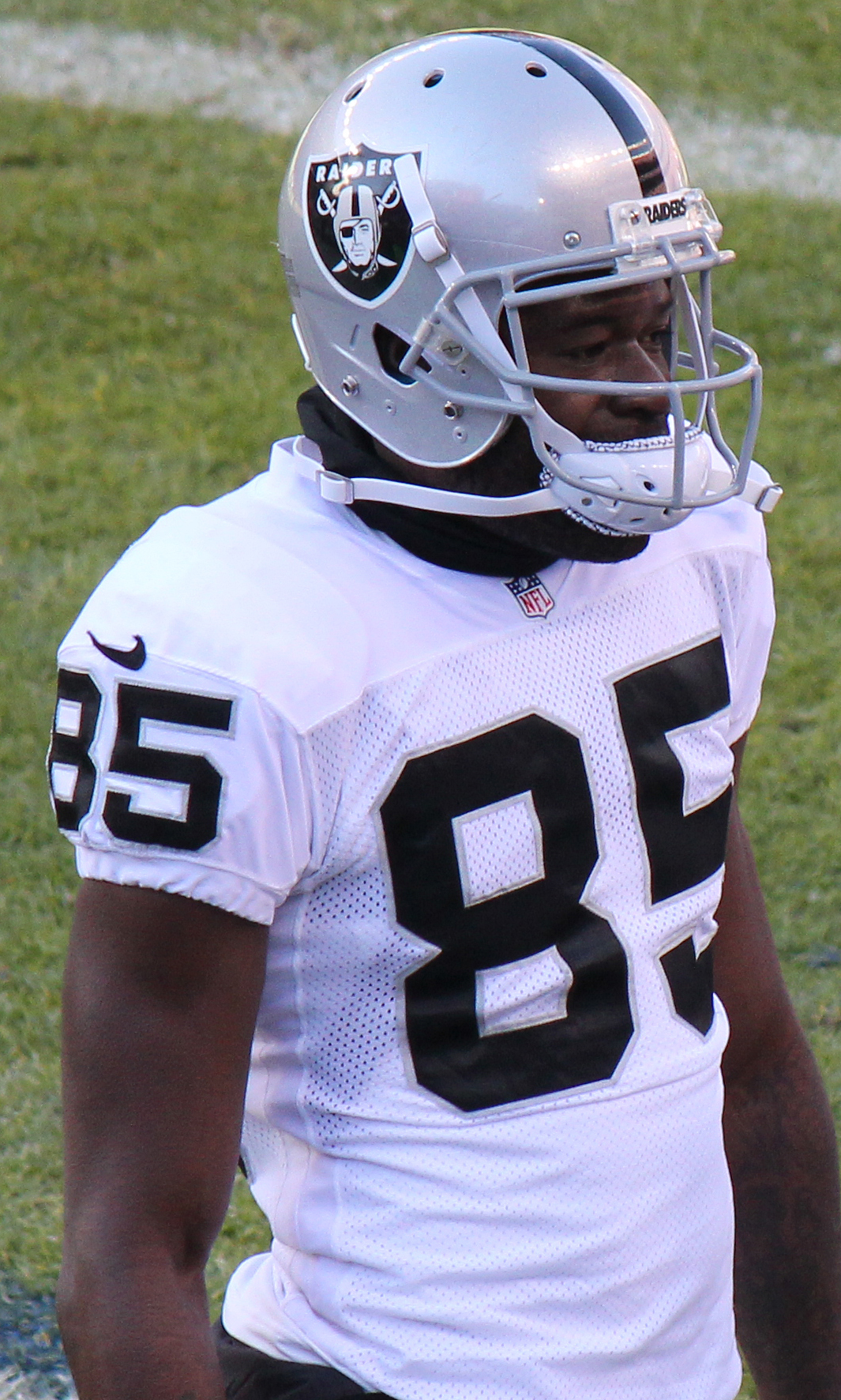
- Thompkins with the Oakland Raiders in 2014

No. 10, 85
- Position: Wide receiver

Personal information
- Born: July 29, 1988 (age 38); Miami, Florida, U.S.
- Listed height: 6 ft 0 in (1.83 m)
- Listed weight: 196 lb (89 kg)

Career information
- High school: Northwestern (Miami)
- College: El Camino (2008–2009); Cincinnati (2010–2012)
- NFL draft: 2013: undrafted

Career history
- New England Patriots (2013–2014); Oakland Raiders (2014); New England Patriots (2015)*; New York Jets (2015); Winnipeg Blue Bombers (2018)
- * Offseason or practice squad member only

Career NFL statistics
- Receptions: 70
- Receiving yards: 893
- Receiving touchdowns: 4
- Stats at Pro Football Reference

Career CFL statistics
- Receptions: 29
- Receiving yards: 421
- Receiving touchdowns: 1
- Stats at CFL.ca

Kenbrell Armod Thompkins (born July 29, 1988) is an American former professional football player who was a wide receiver in the National Football League (NFL). He played college football at El Camino College from 2008 to 2009 and for the Cincinnati Bearcats from 2011 to 2012. He was signed as an undrafted free agent by the New England Patriots in 2013 and was also a member of the Oakland Raiders, New York Jets and Winnipeg Blue Bombers.

== Early life ==
A native of the Liberty City neighborhood of Miami, Thompkins attended Miami Northwestern High School. A classmate of NFL cornerback Anthony Gaitor and Brady Tiggleman, Thompkins started for Northwestern, but was academically ineligible to play as a sophomore and was later expelled for violating school policy. He was allowed to re-enroll prior to his junior football season, only to be expelled again later in the year. After spending his junior year at an alternative school, he re-enrolled at Northwestern for the third time prior to his senior year and finished his high school football career. Not long after the season concluded, Thompkins was expelled for the third time, after being arrested on armed robbery charges.

== College career ==
=== El Camino College ===
Thompkins briefly attended Palomar College in San Marcos, California in 2008 before transferring to El Camino College in Torrance, California to play football. At El Camino College, Thompkins recorded two 1,000-yard seasons in a row, being named a team captain as a sophomore.

Following his sophomore campaign, Thompkins signed with the University of Tennessee in order to play under then-coach Lane Kiffin; following Kiffin's departure to become head coach of the USC Trojans football team, Thompkins transferred to the University of Oklahoma Sooners, but did not play at either university, as Oklahoma has a strict policy against admitting students with a history of legal troubles, following the tumultuous reign of Barry Switzer in the 1980s.

=== Cincinnati ===
Instead, Thompkins transferred to the University of Cincinnati, where he played for two seasons from 2011 to 2012.

As a junior in 2011, Thompkins caught 44 passes for 536 yards (12.2 yards per reception) and two touchdowns. As a senior in 2012, he recorded 34 receptions for 541 yards (15.9) and two touchdowns.

== Professional career ==
Pre-draft measurables
Height	Weight	Arm length	Hand span	40-yard dash	10-yard split	20-yard split	20-yard shuttle	Three-cone drill	Vertical jump	Broad jump	Bench press
6 ft 0 5/8 in (1.84 m)	193 lb (88 kg)	32 1/4 in (0.82 m)	8 3/4 in (0.22 m)	4.54 s	1.59 s	2.65 s	4.21 s	6.88 s	33.5 in (0.85 m)	10 ft 1 in (3.07 m)	8 reps
All values from 2013 NFL Combine

=== New England Patriots (first stint) ===
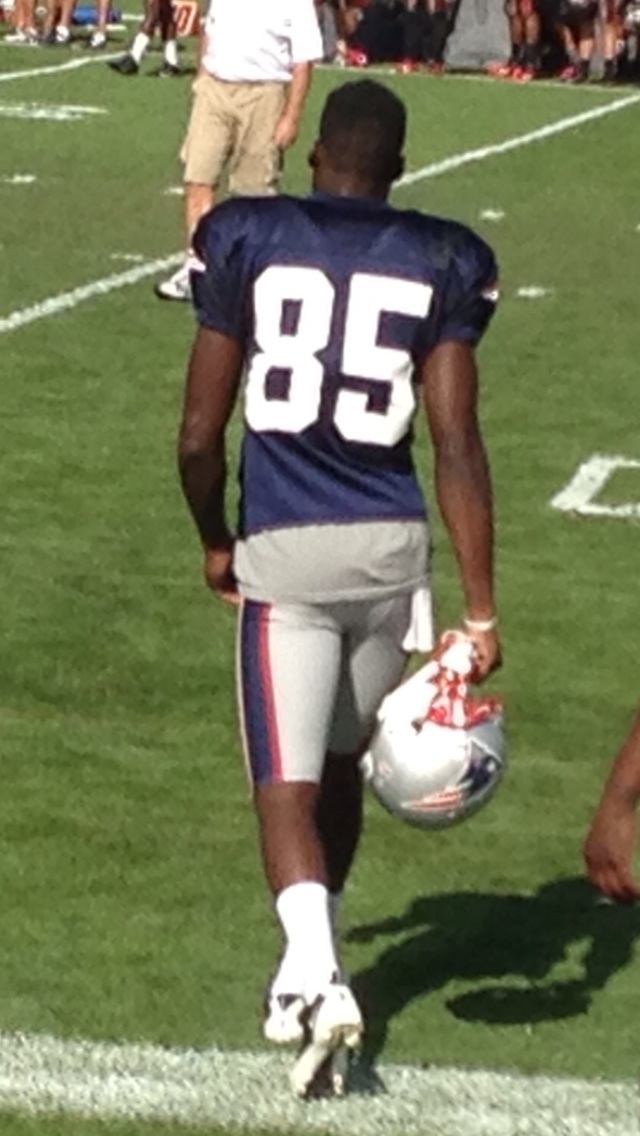
Thompkins with the Patriots in 2013

Thompkins signed with the New England Patriots as an undrafted free agent on May 3, 2013. In his preseason debut, Thompkins registered 4 receptions for 23 yards with the first-team offense against the Philadelphia Eagles. In the third game of the season, Thompkins caught the first two touchdown passes of his career to help the Patriots win the game 23–3 against the Tampa Bay Buccaneers. In Week 6's matchup against the undefeated New Orleans Saints, Thompkins caught the game-winning touchdown on a 2nd down play with 5 seconds remaining in the game. Thompkins was released by the Patriots on October 4, 2014.

=== Oakland Raiders ===
Thompkins was claimed off waivers by the Oakland Raiders two days after his release from the Patriots, on October 6, 2014. He caught 15 passes in 12 games for 209 yards with Oakland and was cut by Oakland on September 1, 2015.

=== New England Patriots (second stint) ===
The Patriots re-signed Thompkins to their practice squad on September 6, 2015. He was released from the practice squad on September 30, 2015.

=== New York Jets ===
On October 2, 2015, the New York Jets signed Thompkins to their practice squad. He was promoted to the active roster on October 20, 2015, after Quincy Enunwa was suspended. On September 3, 2016, Thompkins was released by the Jets as part of their final roster cuts.

On August 16, 2017, Thompkins re-signed with the Jets. On September 2, 2017, Thompkins was released by the Jets.

=== Winnipeg Blue Bombers ===
On May 22, 2018, the Winnipeg Blue Bombers of the Canadian Football League (CFL) announced they had signed Thompkins to a contract. He was shifted to the team's practice roster on June 28, then promoted back to the active roster on July 26. He was placed on the suspended list on May 19, 2019, then released on July 11.

== NFL career statistics ==
Year	Team	GP	Receiving				
Year	Team	GP	Rec	Yds	Avg	Lng	TD
2013	NE	12	32	466	14.6	49	4
2014	NE	2	6	53	8.8	16	0
2014	OAK	12	15	209	13.9	50	0
2015	NYJ	7	17	165	9.7	43	0
Total		33	70	893	12.8	50	4

== Personal life ==
Thompkins is the cousin of wide receiver Antonio Brown and also has a younger brother Kendal Thompkins who played in the Arena Football League.

Thompkins was charged by the U.S. federal government with access device fraud and aggravated identity theft on March 26, 2021, after prosecutors alleged that he stole $300,000 in unemployment benefits from the state of California. He pled guilty to these charges in October 2021. In January 2022, he was sentenced to 25 months in prison and was required to return $132,980.
