= Calvin Russell =

Calvin Russell is the name of:

- Calvin Russell (American football) (born 1983), American football player
- Calvin Russell (musician) (1948–2011), American singer-songwriter and guitarist
- Calvin Russell III (born 2007), American football player
