= Bulls football =

Bulls football may refer to:

- Buffalo Bulls football, the intercollegiate American football team for the University at Buffalo, New York
- Miami Northwestern Bulls, the football team of Miami Northwestern Senior High School, Florida
- South Florida Bulls football, which represents the University of South Florida

== See also ==
- Buffalo Bills, an NFL football team
- Johnson C. Smith Golden Bulls and Lady Golden Bulls, North Carolina
