= Calvin Russell III =

American football and basketball player (born 2007)

No. 6 – Syracuse Orange
- Position: Wide receiver
- Class: Freshman

Personal information
- Born: May 1, 2007 (age 19)
- Listed height: 6 ft 5 in (1.96 m)
- Listed weight: 195 lb (88 kg)

Career information
- High school: Miami Northwestern (Miami, Florida)
- College: Syracuse (2026–present)

Calvin Russell III (born July 5, 2007) is an American college football wide receiver for the Syracuse Orange. He is also a member of the Syracuse basketball team.

== Early life ==
Russell is from Opa Locka, Florida. His mother, Chanivia Broussard, played college basketball for the Miami Hurricanes and is an inductee to the school's sports hall of fame. He attended Miami Northwestern Senior High School where he competed in football, basketball, and track and field. As a sophomore, he won second-team all-county honors in football as a wide receiver and also was named first-team all-county in basketball. He caught 39 passes for 704 yards and 13 touchdowns as a junior in 2024, playing under head coach Teddy Bridgewater, and won the state championship. Russell then posted 47 catches for 742 yards and eight touchdowns as a senior while appearing in the state championship again, being named a finalist for the Nat Moore Trophy, given to the top senior football player in South Florida, and being selected the Dade 3A-1A Offensive Player of the Year.

Russell was ranked a five-star recruit and a top-five wide receiver nationally in the class of 2026. He had over 50 scholarship offers to play college football and over a dozen to play basketball. He committed to play both sports in college with the Syracuse Orange, becoming their highest-ranked football recruit in 20 years.

== College career ==
Russell joined Syracuse's basketball team in January 2026.
