= Teddy Bridgewater =

American football player (born 1992)

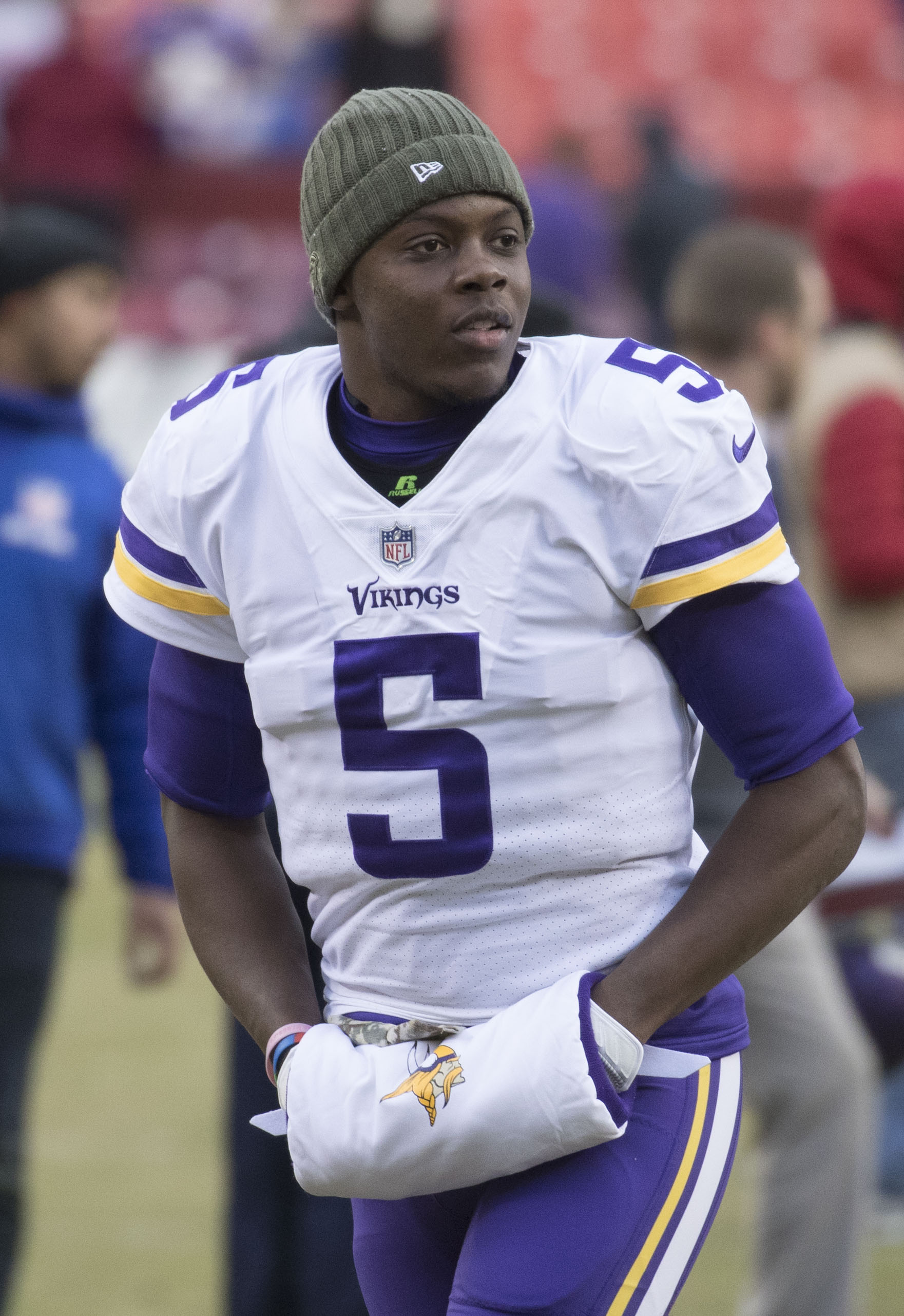
- Bridgewater with the Minnesota Vikings in 2017

No. 5, 10, 12
- Position: Quarterback

Personal information
- Born: November 10, 1992 (age 34); Miami, Florida, U.S.
- Listed height: 6 ft 2 in (1.88 m)
- Listed weight: 212 lb (96 kg)

Career information
- High school: Miami Northwestern
- College: Louisville (2011–2013)
- NFL draft: 2014: 1st round, 32nd overall pick

Career history

Playing
- Minnesota Vikings (2014–2017); New York Jets (2018)*; New Orleans Saints (2018–2019); Carolina Panthers (2020); Denver Broncos (2021); Miami Dolphins (2022); Detroit Lions (2023–2024); Tampa Bay Buccaneers (2025); Detroit Lions (2026)*
- * Offseason or practice squad member only

Coaching
- Miami Northwestern (FL) (2024) Head coach

Awards and highlights
- Pepsi NFL Rookie of the Year (2014); Pro Bowl (2015); PFWA All-Rookie Team (2014); NCAA completion percentage leader (2013); First-team All-Big East (2012); Second-team All-AAC (2013); Big East Offensive Player of The Year (2012); Big East Rookie of the Year (2011)

Career NFL statistics
- Passing attempts: 2,082
- Passing completions: 1,380
- Completion percentage: 66.3%
- TD–INT: 75–47
- Passing yards: 15,182
- Passer rating: 90.3
- Stats at Pro Football Reference

Theodore Edmond Bridgewater Jr. (born November 10, 1992) is an American former professional football player who was a quarterback in the National Football League (NFL) for 12 seasons. He played college football for the Louisville Cardinals, winning Big East Offensive Player of The Year in 2012 and leading the NCAA in completion percentage the following season. Bridgewater was selected as the final first-round pick of the 2014 NFL draft by the Minnesota Vikings. During his second season, Bridgewater led the Vikings to a division title and earned Pro Bowl honors.

Upon suffering a severe leg injury during the 2016 offseason, Bridgewater appeared in only one game over the next two years. He joined the New Orleans Saints in 2018 as a backup, becoming the starter in relief of Drew Brees for five games the following year and helping contribute to them winning their division. Bridgewater later held starting roles with the Carolina Panthers and Denver Broncos for one season each before serving as a backup for the Lions, Miami Dolphins, and Tampa Bay Buccaneers. After retiring from the NFL in 2023, Bridgewater became the head football coach at Miami Northwestern, his former high school, and led them to a state championship. Bridgewater returned to the NFL a year later, rejoining the Lions and Buccaneers as a backup before retiring for a second time in 2026.

== Early life ==
The son of Teddy Bridgewater Sr. and Rose Murphy, Bridgewater was born in Miami, Florida, on November 10, 1992. He attended Miami Northwestern Senior High School. The school's football field was later renamed in Bridgewater's honor. As a sophomore, he replaced Jacory Harris as starting quarterback and took over a team that had been named the 2007 national champions by USA Today the previous year. Bridgewater completed 97 of 160 attempts (60.6 percent) for 1,560 yards over the season, throwing 16 touchdowns with three interceptions. He also rushed 45 times for 211 yards (4.7 average) and two more scores. Northwestern finished the season 13–3, falling short to Seminole High School of Sanford 28–21 in the 6A state title game.

As a junior, Bridgewater passed for 2,546 yards and 32 touchdowns and rushed for 379 yards and five more scores. In a late-September game against Hialeah-Miami Lakes High School, he completed 19 of 24 passes for 327 yards and a Dade County record seven touchdowns. Bridgewater was named second-team All-State for 6A classification and first-team All-County by the Miami Herald. Northwestern finished the season 10–2, after a 29–16 loss to rival Miami Central High School.

As a senior, Bridgewater had 2,606 passing yards and 22 touchdowns despite missing parts of the season with a medial collateral ligament injury. He also rushed for 223 yards and eight more scores. Northwestern had a 9–3 record for the season, losing 42–27 to Miami Central in the 6-A semifinals, in which he threw for 436 yards and scored four touchdowns.

Regarded as a four-star recruit, Bridgewater was considered the sixth best dual-threat quarterback prospect in the nation by Rivals.com. He played in the 2011 U.S. Army All-American Bowl.

Bridgewater originally committed to the University of Miami in June 2010. However, after the firing of Miami head coach Randy Shannon in November 2010, Bridgewater switched his commitment to the University of Louisville.

College recruiting
Name	Hometown	School	Height	Weight	40^{‡}	Commit date
Teddy Bridgewater; QB	Miami, Florida	Miami Northwestern High School	6 ft 2 in (1.88 m)	180 lb (82 kg)	4.19	Dec 10, 2010
Teddy Bridgewater; QB	Recruit ratings: Scout: Rivals: (80)					
Overall recruit ranking: Scout: 6 (QB) Rivals: 6 (QB), 23 (FL), 113 (National) ESPN: 9 (QB), 73 (Southeast)
Note: In many cases, Scout, Rivals, 247Sports, On3, and ESPN may conflict in their listings of height and weight.; In these cases, the average was taken. ESPN grades are on a 100-point scale.; Sources: "Louisville Football Commitment List". Rivals.; "Louisville College Football Recruiting Commits". Scout.; "ESPN". ESPN.; "Scout.com Team Recruiting Rankings". Scout.; "2011 Team Ranking". Rivals.com.

== College career ==
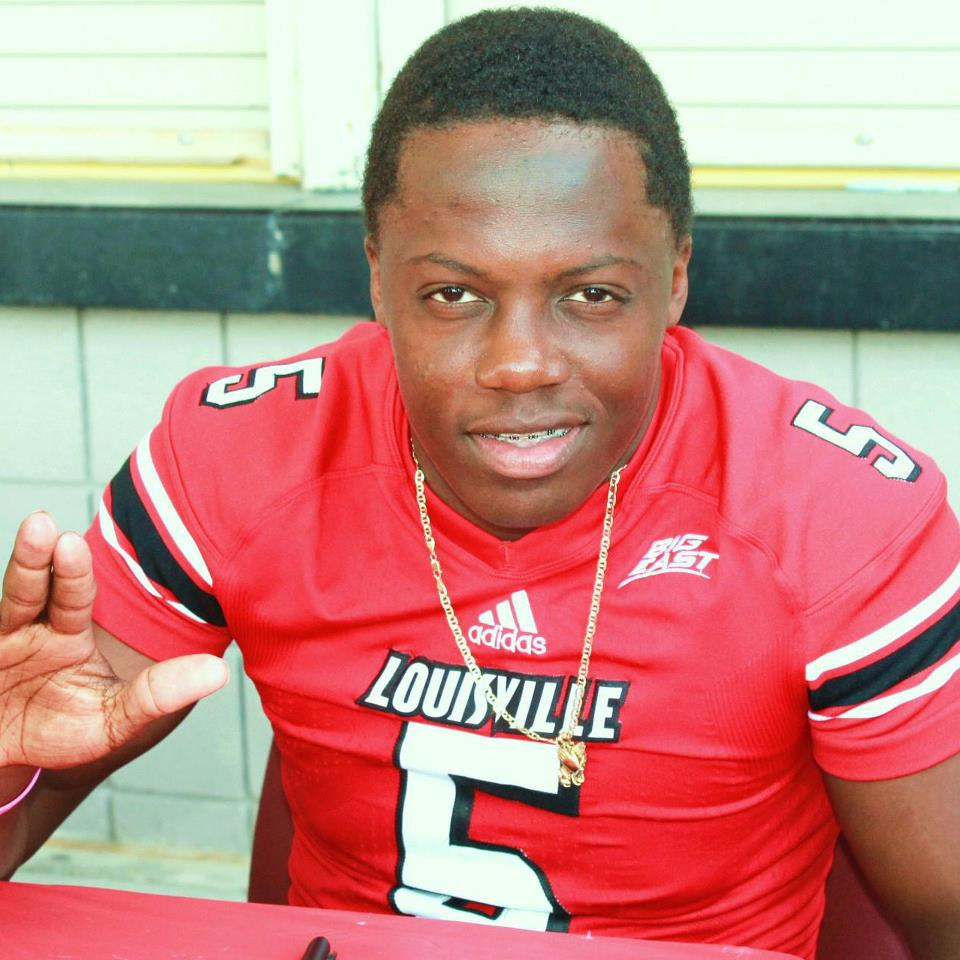
Bridgewater at Louisville in 2011.

As a freshman at Louisville in 2011, Bridgewater entered the season as a backup to Will Stein. However, by the Cardinals' fourth game of the season against Marshall, Bridgewater was starting and remained the starter the rest of the year. He finished the season completing 191 of 296 passes for 2,129 yards, 14 touchdowns, and 12 interceptions. For his play, Bridgewater was named the Big East Rookie of the Year and was named a freshman All-American by Rivals.com, Scout.com, CBS Sports, and Sporting News.

As a sophomore in 2012, Bridgewater started 11 of 12 regular season games. In his only non-starting action, coming off the bench while injured against Rutgers, Bridgewater led his team to a win, a Big East title, and a berth to the BCS. He finished the regular season completing 267-of-387 passes for 3,452 yards, 25 touchdowns, and seven interceptions. Bridgewater finished sixth in the nation in completion percentage, eighth in yards per attempt, and seventh in passing efficiency. For his play, Bridgewater was named the Big East Offensive Player of the Year.

The Cardinals entered the 2013 Sugar Bowl against the Florida Gators as decided underdogs. Although Florida boasted the nation's #1 pass efficiency defense, Bridgewater passed for 266 yards and two touchdowns to become the game's MVP during a 33–23 victory.

As a junior in 2013, Bridgewater completed 303-of-427 passes for 3,970 yards, 31 touchdowns, and four interceptions, leading the NCAA with a 71% completion percentage. In his final college game against the Miami Hurricanes in the 2013 Russell Athletic Bowl, Bridgewater completed 35-of-42 passes for 447 yards three touchdowns and was named the game's MVP.

== Professional career ==
=== Pre-draft ===
As early as April 2013, Bridgewater was seen as one of the top prospects for the 2014 NFL draft, alongside Jadeveon Clowney and Johnny Manziel. Reports said that, had Bridgewater been eligible for the 2013 draft, he most likely would have been the first quarterback taken. At one point, Bridgewater was projected by many to be the first overall pick in the draft. On January 1, 2014, he announced that he would forgo his final year of eligibility at Louisville.

External videos
- Bridgewater's NFL Combine workout
- Bridgewater gets drafted by Minnesota

Pre-draft measurables
Height	Weight	Arm length	Hand span	Wingspan	40-yard dash	10-yard split	20-yard split	20-yard shuttle	Three-cone drill	Vertical jump	Broad jump	Wonderlic
6 ft 2 1/8 in (1.88 m)	214 lb (97 kg)	33 in (0.84 m)	9 1/4 in (0.23 m)	6 ft 6 5/8 in (2.00 m)	4.79 s	1.63 s	2.76 s	4.20 s	7.17 s	30 in (0.76 m)	9 ft 5 in (2.87 m)	20
40 yard dash times from Louisville Pro Day, all others from NFL Combine

=== Minnesota Vikings ===
==== 2014 season ====
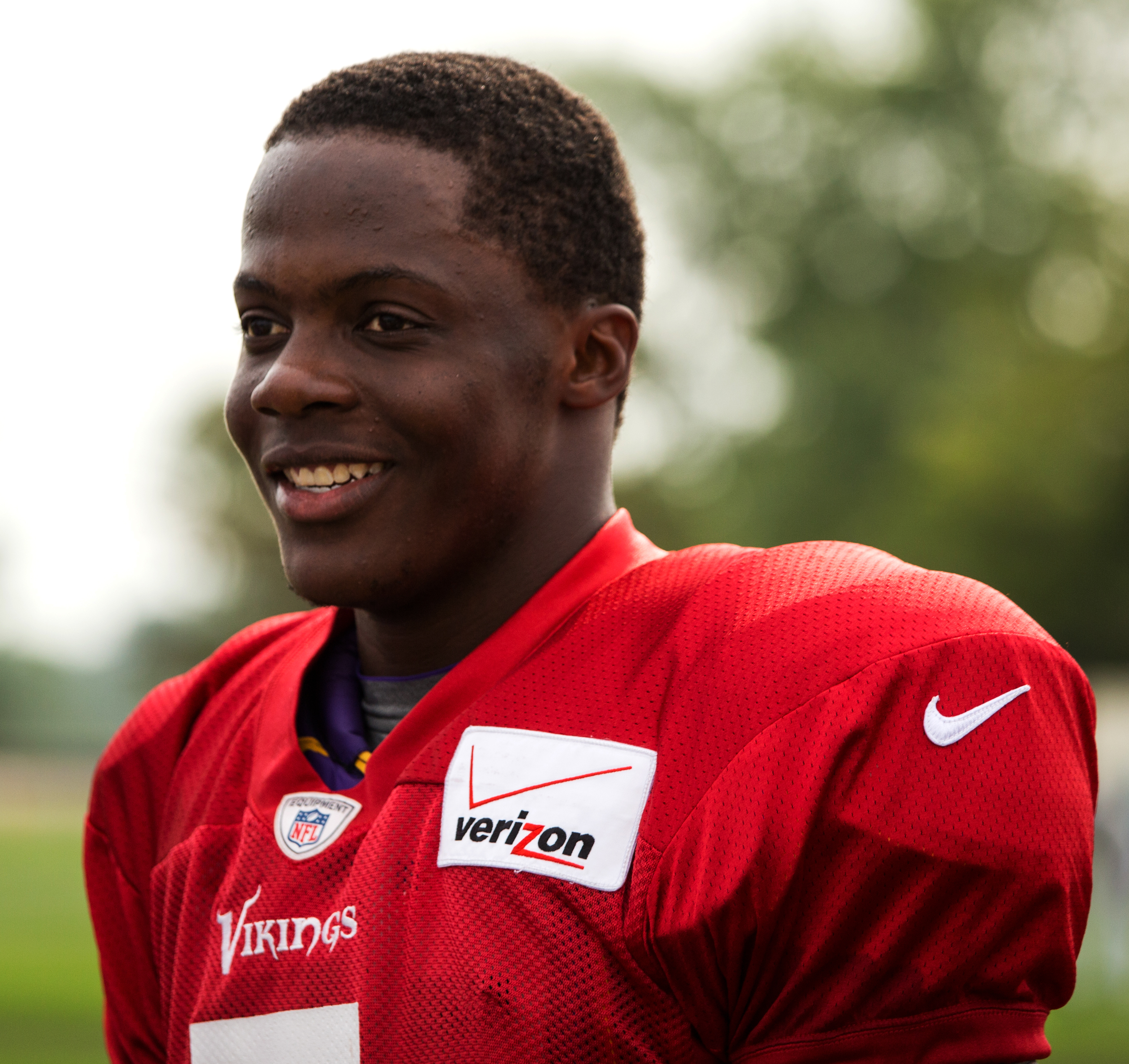
Bridgewater in 2014

Bridgewater was selected by the Minnesota Vikings as the 32nd and final pick of the first round of the draft. Minnesota had traded their second-round and fourth-round picks to the Seattle Seahawks to move up and select Bridgewater. He signed a four-year contract worth $6.85 million with a $3.3 million signing bonus with the Vikings.

Bridgewater entered the season as the second-string quarterback, behind veteran Matt Cassel, but ahead of Christian Ponder. During a Week 3 20–9 road loss to the New Orleans Saints, Bridgewater made his NFL debut, entering in relief of the injured Cassel and finished with 150 passing yards and 27 rushing yards. Bridgewater was named the starting quarterback for the remainder of the season after Cassel was placed on injured reserve with a broken foot.

During Week 4, Bridgewater made his first NFL start against the Atlanta Falcons. He finished the 41–28 victory with 317 passing yards to go along with 27 rushing yards and a touchdown. After spraining his ankle during the Falcons matchup, Bridgewater was inactive for the next game against the Green Bay Packers. However, he was able to recover in time for the Week 6 game against the Detroit Lions. Despite his return, a weak offensive line against a strong Lions' defense led to a 17–3 rout. Bridgewater was intercepted thrice, twice from tipped passes, and was sacked eight times.

During Week 7 against the Buffalo Bills, Bridgewater threw his first NFL touchdown pass to Cordarrelle Patterson. Although he was sacked five times and threw two interceptions, Bridgewater helped the Vikings get a 16–10 lead, but the effort was negated by the Bills' comeback which put them up 17–16 with no time left to retaliate. In the next game against the Tampa Bay Buccaneers, Bridgewater threw for 241 yards and a touchdown and was sacked once. He led a game-tying drive to force overtime, where fellow first-round pick Anthony Barr made a fumble recovery on the Bucs' first overtime play, giving the Vikings a 19–13 overtime road victory.

His third win as a starter, a 29–26 comeback victory over the Washington Redskins, broke a franchise record shared by Fran Tarkenton and Ponder for wins among starting rookie quarterbacks. In the following weeks, Bridgewater added to this record with wins over the Carolina Panthers, New York Jets, and Chicago Bears (Weeks 13, 14, and 17 respectively). In the win against the Jets, wide receiver Jarius Wright turned a screen pass from Bridgewater into an 87-yard touchdown, giving the Vikings another overtime victory.

Bridgewater finished his rookie year with 2,919 passing yards, 14 touchdowns, 12 interceptions, and an 85.2 passer rating, to go along with 209 rushing yards and a touchdown in 13 games with 12 starts. On January 13, 2015, Bridgewater was selected as the quarterback of the 2014 NFL All-Rookie team by the Pro Football Writers of America, joining Tommy Kramer as the only Vikings' quarterbacks to claim this award. Bridgewater also won the 2014 Pepsi Rookie of the Year award, as voted by fans.

==== 2015 season ====
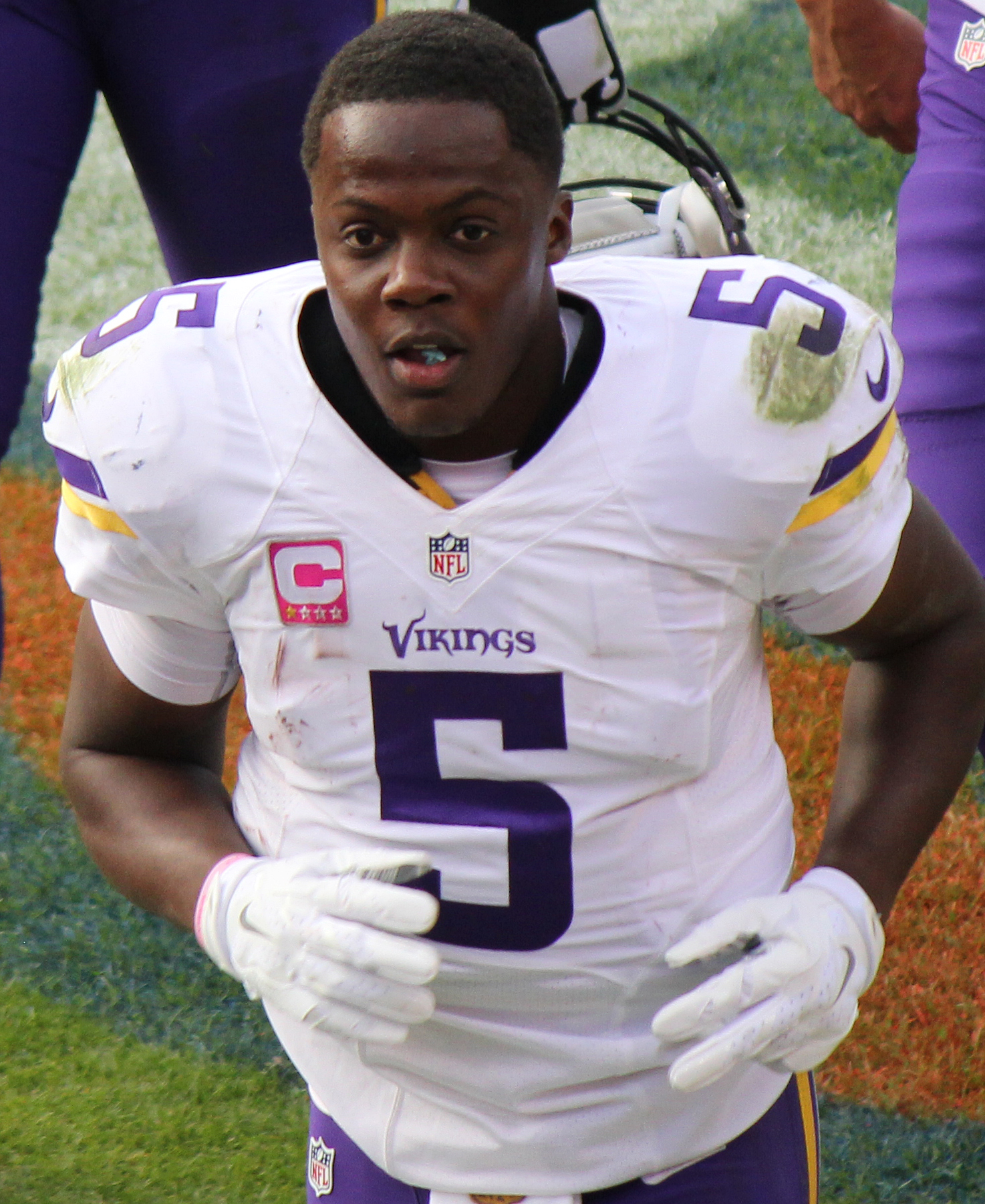
Bridgewater in 2015

Bridgewater threw for 231 yards and an interception behind a struggling offensive line that allowed five sacks in the season-opening 20–3 road loss to the San Francisco 49ers. He threw only 18 times the next game, but completed 14 of those passes for 153 yards and threw his first touchdown pass of the year to tight end Kyle Rudolph in a 26–16 victory over the Lions in Minnesota's home opener. Bridgewater had some struggles the following week against the San Diego Chargers, going 13 of 24 for 121 yards and one interception but won the game 31–14 with a strong performance by the defense and running back Adrian Peterson. Bridgewater rebounded in Week 4, going 27-of-41 for 269 yards and a touchdown to Mike Wallace against the Denver Broncos who had the number one ranked defense coming into the game. Minnesota still lost on the road 23–20 as Bridgewater was sacked seven times.

Coming off of a bye week, Bridgewater threw for 249 yards and another touchdown pass to Rudolph, but threw two interceptions in a 16–10 victory over the Kansas City Chiefs. Bridgewater then had arguably the best game of his career the following week against the Lions going 25-of-35 for 316 yards, two touchdowns, and no interceptions, including his first touchdown pass to rookie Stefon Diggs. The 28–19 road victory was Bridgewater's fourth career 300+ yard passing game, and the second 300+ passing game of his career against the Lions. The following week against the Bears, Bridgewater led his fourth career fourth-quarter comeback despite having a below-average day going 17-of-30 for 187 yards, a touchdown, and an interception in the 23–20 road victory.

Bridgewater went 13 of 21 for 144 yards and an interception while also rushing for a touchdown and two-point conversion against the St. Louis Rams before sustaining a blow to the head by the Rams' safety Lamarcus Joyner that caused Bridgewater to leave the game in the fourth quarter. Minnesota still managed to pull off a 21–18 overtime victory. At home against the Bears in Week 15, Bridgewater completed 17 of 20 pass attempts for 231 yards, four touchdowns, and a rushing touchdown during a 38–17 victory, giving him a career-high passer rating (154.4). Two weeks later in a fight for the NFC North Division Title against the Packers, Bridgewater connected only 52.6% of his passes for 99 yards and an interception. Despite his career-lowest passer rating (45.7), the Vikings pulled off a 20–13 victory and won their first division title since 2009.

Bridgewater finished his second professional season with 3,231 passing yards, 14 touchdowns, and nine interceptions to go along with 192 rushing yards and three touchdowns in 16 games and starts. During the Wild Card Round against the Seahawks in one of the coldest games ever played, Bridgewater was 17-of-24 for 146 yards as the Vikings fell 10–9 after Blair Walsh missed a 27-yard field goal. On January 25, 2016, Bridgewater was named to his first Pro Bowl.

==== 2016 season ====
During a team practice on August 30, 2016, Bridgewater suffered a non-contact injury to his left leg. An ambulance took Bridgewater off the field and the rest of practice was canceled. A subsequent MRI confirmed that he tore his ACL and suffered other structural damage, including a dislocation of the knee joint. The injury was so severe that Bridgewater was at risk of losing his leg, with the surgeon describing it as a "horribly grotesque injury... It's almost like a war wound. Everything is blown." As a result, Bridgewater missed the entire 2016 season.

After the loss of Bridgewater for at least the 2016 season, the Vikings traded a first-round pick in the 2017 NFL draft and a conditional fourth-round pick in the 2018 NFL draft to the Philadelphia Eagles for quarterback Sam Bradford. In 2016, the Vikings went 8–8, finishing third in the NFC North and missing the playoffs, despite starting the season with a 5–0 record.

==== 2017 season ====
The media initially reported that Bridgewater's injury would keep him out for 17–19 months, meaning that he would miss the entire 2017 season. In January 2017, doctors confirmed that the healing would indeed take 19 months.

On May 1, 2017, the Vikings declined the fifth-year option on Bridgewater's contract, making him a free agent after the 2017 season.

Bridgewater began throwing and doing individual work in May at Vikings mini camps. On June 6, head coach Mike Zimmer said that Bridgewater "has a long way to go" until being fully healed, but was impressed by his rehabilitation progress to that point. However, on September 2, the Vikings announced that Bridgewater would begin the season on the PUP list, meaning that he would miss the first six games of the season.

On October 16, Bridgewater was cleared to practice, but could not return to action for three more weeks. He was activated off PUP to the active roster on November 8 to be Case Keenum's backup. Bridgewater entered the Week 15 game against the Cincinnati Bengals in relief of Keenum in the fourth quarter. The crowd gave Bridgewater a standing ovation as he walked onto the field. Bridgewater finished with an interception out of two pass attempts as the Vikings won 34–7.

=== New York Jets ===
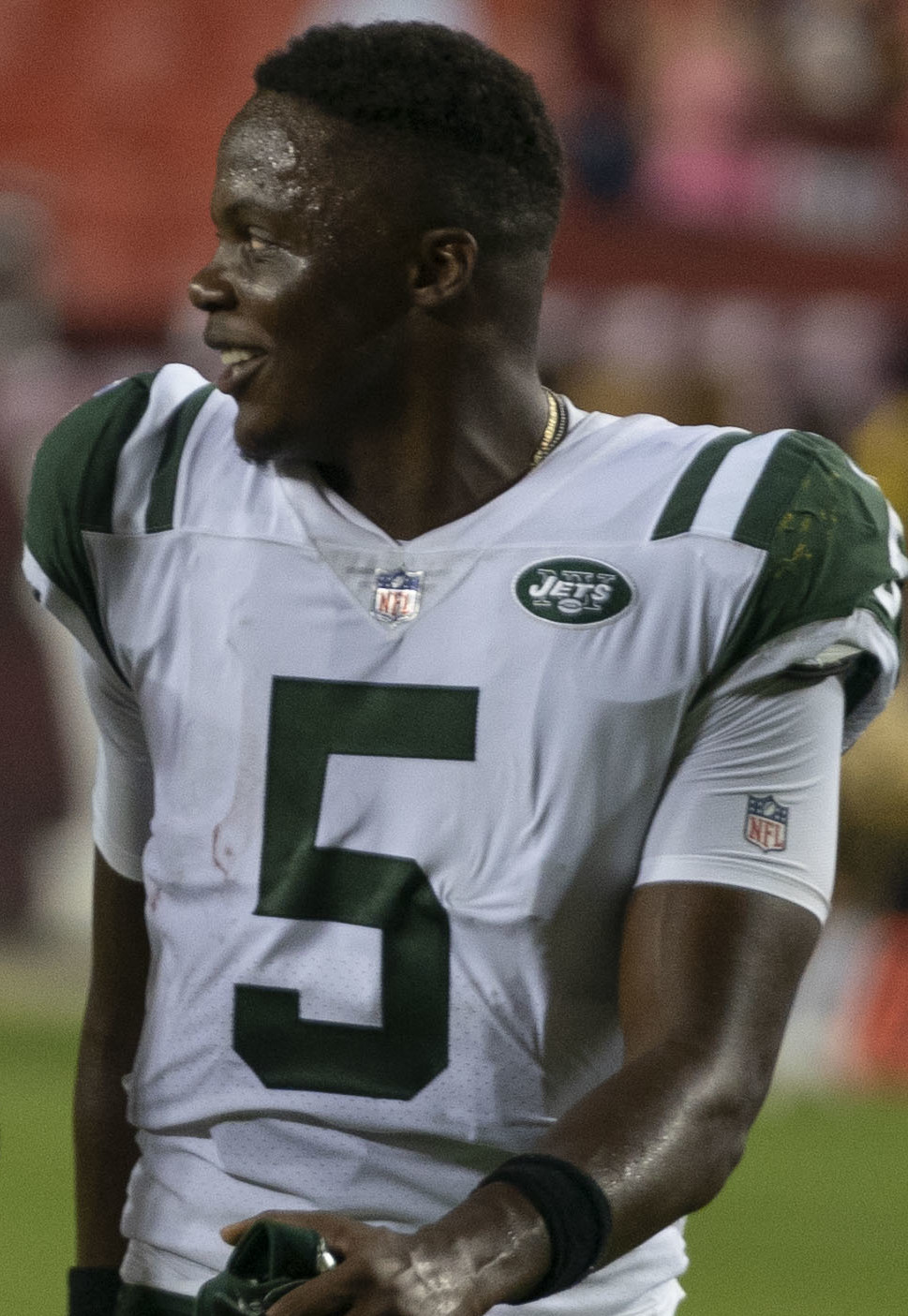
Bridgewater in 2018

On March 18, 2018, Bridgewater signed a one-year contract with the Jets. The contract only guaranteed a $500,000 signing bonus, though he could make up to a maximum of $15 million from a non-guaranteed salary and incentives.

=== New Orleans Saints ===
==== 2018 season ====
On August 29, 2018, the Jets traded Bridgewater and a 2019 sixth-round draft pick to the New Orleans Saints for a 2019 third-round draft pick.

Bridgewater made his Saints debut in Week 5 against the Redskins, taking a knee twice to close out the 43–19 victory. He did this in two more games later in the season.

On December 28, with the Saints already having locked up the #1-seed, the team announced that Bridgewater would start in the season finale against the Panthers. Making his first start since 2015, Bridgewater finished the 33–14 loss completing 14-of-22 passes for 118 yards, a touchdown, and an interception while also rushing for 12 yards.

==== 2019 season ====
On March 15, 2019, Bridgewater signed a one-year, $7.25 million fully guaranteed contract with the Saints.

During Week 2 against the Los Angeles Rams, Bridgewater replaced Drew Brees, who left with a right thumb injury, completing 17 of 30 passes for 165 yards in the 27–9 road loss. Due to Brees' injury, Bridgewater was named the starting quarterback for Week 3 matchup against the Seahawks. He finished the 33–27 road victory completing 19-of-27 passes for 177 yards and two touchdowns, marking the first game where Bridgewater threw for more than one touchdown in a game since Week 15 of the 2015 season. Two weeks later against the Buccaneers, Bridgewater threw for 314 yards, four touchdowns, and an interception in the 31–24 victory. In the next game against the Jacksonville Jaguars, he had 240 passing yards and a touchdown during the 13–6 road victory.

During a Week 7 36–25 road victory over the Bears, Bridgewater threw for 281 yards and two touchdowns. Brees returned from his injury in Week 8 against the Arizona Cardinals.

Bridgewater finished the 2019 season with 1,384 passing yards, nine touchdowns, and two interceptions in nine games and five starts.

=== Carolina Panthers ===
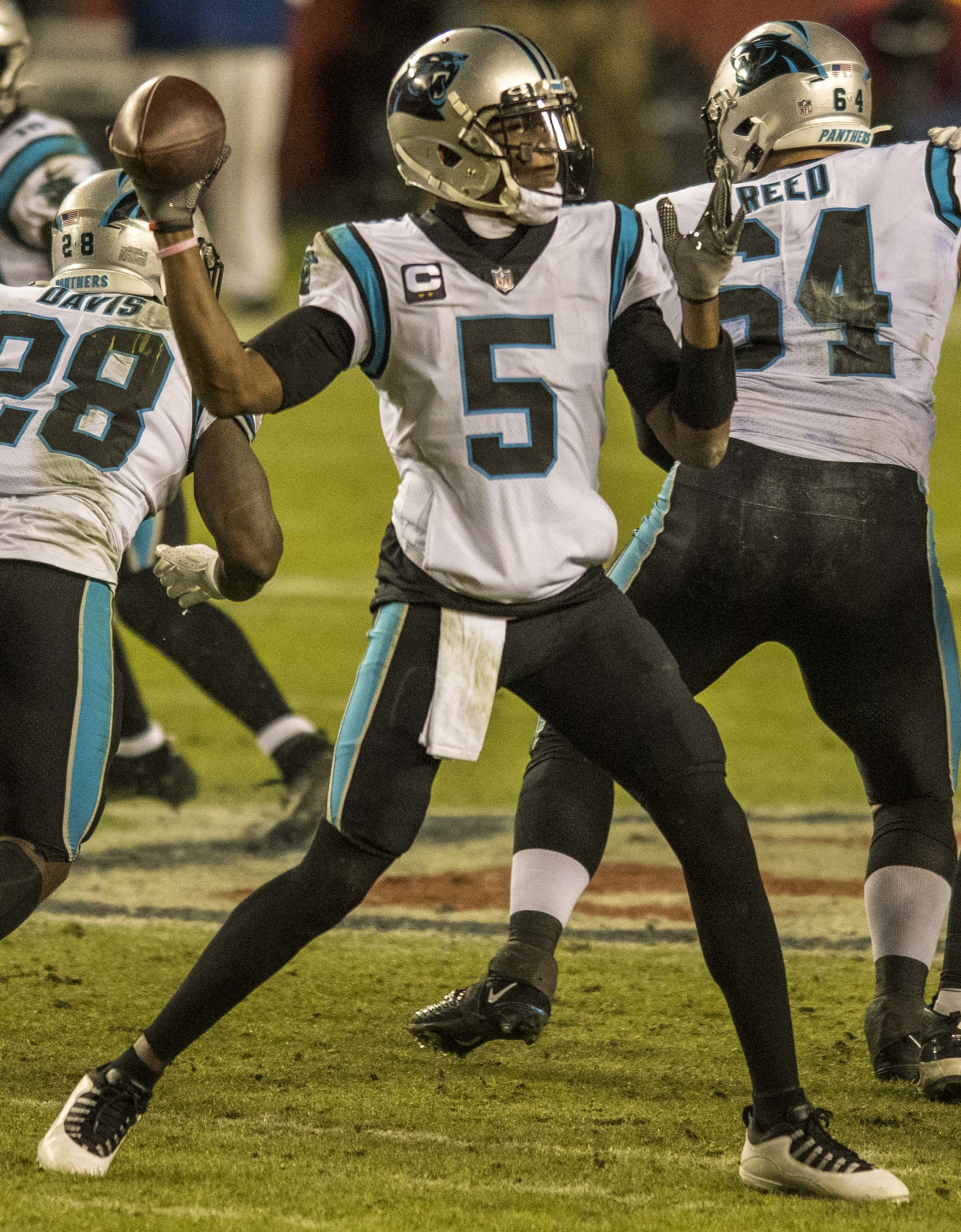
Bridgewater in 2020

On March 26, 2020, Bridgewater signed a three-year, $63 million contract with the Panthers.

Bridgewater made his Panthers debut in the season-opening 34–30 loss to the Las Vegas Raiders and finished with 269 passing yards, including a 75-yard touchdown to former Jets teammate Robby Anderson. In the next game against the Buccaneers, Bridgewater threw for 367 yards and two interceptions during the 31–17 road loss. The following week against the Los Angeles Chargers, Bridgewater had 235 passing yards and a touchdown during the 21–16 road victory. This was Bridgewater's first win as a Panther.

During Week 5 against the Falcons, Bridgewater threw for 313 yards and two touchdowns in the 23–16 victory. In Week 9 against the Chiefs, he threw for 310 yards and two touchdowns and rushed for 19 yards and another touchdown during the narrow 33–31 loss.

Bridgewater finished the 2020 season with career-high totals in several statistics, including completions (340), passing yards (3,733), passing touchdowns (15), rushing touchdowns (5), and rushing yards (279). He was the 2020 recipient of the Art Rooney Award.

=== Denver Broncos ===
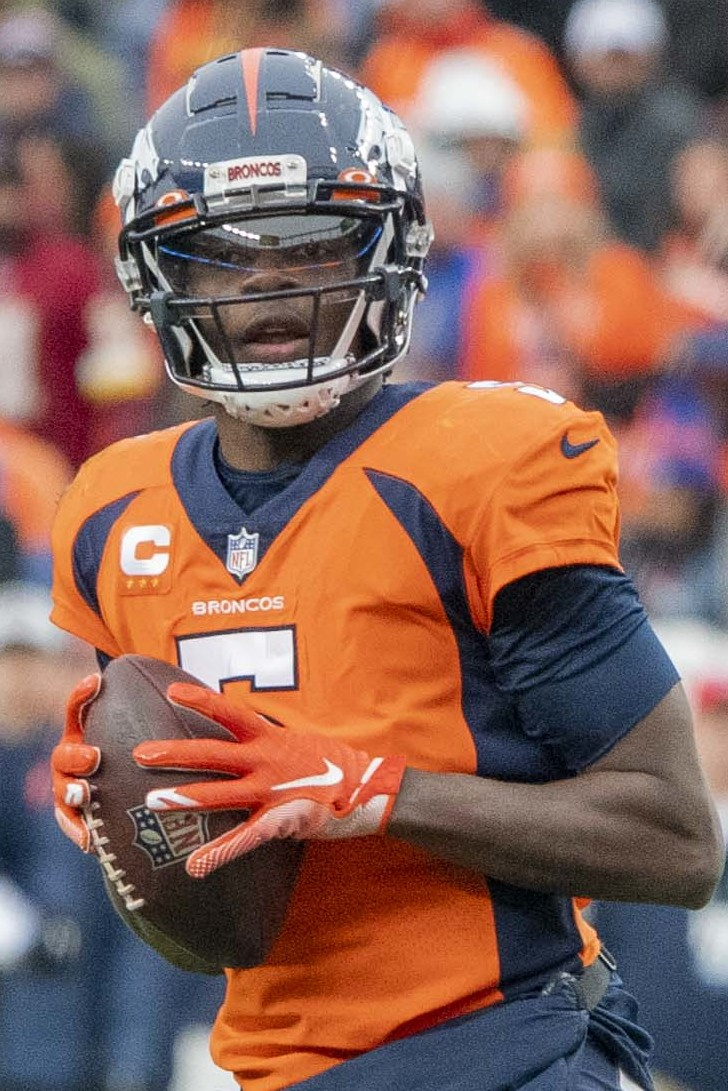
Bridgewater in 2021

On April 28, 2021, weeks after the Panthers acquired Sam Darnold in a trade with the Jets, Bridgewater was traded to the Broncos in exchange for a 2021 sixth-round pick. The team brought in Bridgewater to compete with incumbent quarterback Drew Lock, and the players split starts throughout the 2021 preseason. On August 25, the Broncos announced that Bridgewater had won the starting job.

During the season-opener against the New York Giants, Bridgewater made his Broncos debut, completing 28-of-36 passes for 264 yards and two touchdowns in the 27–13 road victory. He then led the team to 2–0 with a victory over the Jaguars in Week 2 with a 328-yard, two-touchdown day. The Broncos started 3–0 before losing five of their next seven games. Bridgewater suffered a concussion in the Week 15 loss to the Bengals (which made them 7–7) that would rule him out for the rest of the season. Bridgewater was placed on injured reserve on January 5, 2022.

Bridgewater finished the 2021 season with 3,052 passing yards, 18 touchdowns, and seven interceptions to go along with 30 carries for 106 yards and two touchdowns in 14 games and starts.

=== Miami Dolphins ===
On March 17, 2022, Bridgewater signed a one-year, $6.5 million contract with the Miami Dolphins worth up to $10 million.

Bridgewater made his Dolphins debut in Week 3 against the Bills after starter Tua Tagovailoa briefly left the game in the second quarter. He attempted two passes and was sacked once before Tagovailoa returned in the second half. In the next game against the Bengals, Bridgewater came in the second quarter after Tagovailoa left the game with a head and neck injury. Bridgewater threw for 193 yards, a touchdown, and an interception during the 27–15 loss. The following week against his former team, the Jets, Bridgewater committed an intentional grounding penalty that occurred in the endzone for a safety. During the play, he was hit by Sauce Gardner and left the game due to a concussion.

During Week 6 against his former team, the Vikings, Bridgewater came into the game in relief of Skylar Thompson and threw for 329 yards, two touchdowns, and two interceptions in the 24–16 loss. Following Tua Tagovailoa entering concussion protocols after their Week 16 loss against the Packers, head coach Mike McDaniel announced that Bridgewater would start against the New England Patriots in Week 17. Bridgewater completed 12-of-19 passes for 161 yards, a touchdown, and an interception that was returned for a touchdown before exiting the eventual narrow 23–21 loss during the third quarter after suffering a broken finger in his throwing hand. Due to Bridgewater's injury, third-string rookie quarterback Skylar Thompson made his second start of the season in Week 18 against the Jets.

=== Detroit Lions (first stint) ===
On August 10, 2023, Bridgewater signed a one-year, $3 million deal with the Lions, a move which reunited him with Dan Campbell, the assistant head coach during his time with the Saints.

On December 16, 2023, Bridgewater announced his plans to retire from the NFL following the conclusion of the season, and become a high school football coach. Bridgewater was named head football coach at Miami Northwestern on February 2, 2024.

A year after retirement, Bridgewater announced on NFL Network that he intended to continue his playing career in the NFL, and he was re-signed by the Lions on December 26, 2024, to a one-year $1.21 million contract joining Hendon Hooker in backing up starting quarterback Jared Goff for the remainder of the season. Bridgewater briefly appeared in the Divisional Round game against the Washington Commanders, relieving Jared Goff who underwent concussion evaluation for three plays during the second quarter. He completed his only pass for three yards, and handed off the ball in a trick play that led to a 61-yard rushing touchdown from Jameson Williams. Goff returned after the next possession, although the Lions were ultimately upset 45–31 and knocked out of the playoffs.

=== Tampa Bay Buccaneers ===
On August 5, 2025, Bridgewater signed a one-year, $1.255 million contract with the Tampa Bay Buccaneers after resigning as head coach for Miami Northwestern Senior High School. He appeared in relief of Baker Mayfield in Week 12 against the Los Angeles Rams.

=== Detroit Lions (second stint) ===
On March 24, 2026, Bridgewater signed a one-year, $1.8 million contract with the Lions. On August 9, Lions head coach Dan Campbell announced that Bridgewater would be stepping away from the team. The Lions placed Bridgewater on the reserved-retired list, indicating that he likely planned to retire. The next day, Bridgewater announced he had officially retired.

== Career statistics ==
Legend
**Bold**	Career high

=== NFL ===
==== Regular season ====
Year	Team	Games			Passing									Rushing					Sacks		Fumbles	
Year	Team	GP	GS	Record	Cmp	Att	Pct	Yds	Y/A	Lng	TD	Int	Rtg	Att	Yds	Avg	Lng	TD	Sck	SckY	Fum	Lost
2014	MIN	13	12	6−6	259	402	64.4	2,919	7.3	**87**	14	**12**	85.2	47	209	4.4	16	1	39	249	3	0
2015	MIN	16	16	11−5	292	447	65.3	3,231	7.2	52	14	9	88.7	44	192	4.4	**19**	3	**44**	**307**	**8**	**3**
2016	MIN	0	0	—	Did not play due to injury																	
2017	MIN	1	0	—	0	2	0.0	0	0.0	0	0	1	0.0	3	−3	−1.0	−1	0	0	0	0	0
2018	NO	5	1	0−1	14	23	60.9	118	5.1	18	1	1	70.6	11	5	0.5	9	0	2	8	0	0
2019	NO	9	5	**5−0**	133	196	67.9	1,384	7.1	45	9	2	**99.1**	28	31	1.1	11	0	12	89	1	0
2020	CAR	15	15	4−11	**340**	**492**	**69.1**	**3,733**	7.6	75	15	11	92.1	**53**	**279**	5.3	18	**5**	31	205	6	**3**
2021	DEN	14	14	7−7	285	426	66.9	3,052	7.2	64	**18**	7	94.9	30	106	3.5	13	2	31	211	1	1
2022	MIA	5	2	0−2	49	79	62.0	683	**8.6**	64	4	4	85.6	3	27	**9.0**	11	0	7	45	0	0
2023	DET	1	0	—	0	0	0.0	0	0.0	0	0	0	0.0	2	−2	−1.0	−1	0	0	0	0	0
2024	DET	0	0	—	DNP																	
2025	TB	4	0	—	8	15	53.3	62	4.1	32	0	0	63.7	3	4	1.3	6	0	2	21	0	0
Career		83	65	33−32	1,380	2,082	66.3	15,182	7.3	87	75	47	90.3	224	848	3.8	19	11	168	1,135	19	7

==== Postseason ====
Year	Team	Games			Passing									Rushing					Sacks		Fumbles	
Year	Team	GP	GS	Record	Cmp	Att	Pct	Yds	Y/A	Lng	TD	Int	Rtg	Att	Yds	Avg	Lng	TD	Sck	SckY	Fum	Lost
2015	MIN	1	1	0−1	**17**	**24**	70.8	**146**	**6.1**	**24**	0	0	**86.5**	**3**	0	0.0	**2**	0	**3**	**21**	0	0
2017	MIN	0	0	—	DNP																	
2018	NO	0	0	—	DNP																	
2019	NO	0	0	—	DNP																	
2022	MIA	0	0	—	DNP																	
2023	DET	0	0	—	DNP																	
2024	DET	1	0	—	1	1	**100.0**	3	3.0	3	0	0	79.2	0	0	0.0	0	0	0	0	0	0
Career		2	1	0−1	18	25	72.0	149	6.0	24	0	0	86.9	3	0	0.0	2	0	3	21	0	0

=== College ===
Legend
Led the NCAA

Season	Team	Passing								Rushing					Total yds
Season	Team	Cmp	Att	Yds	Pct	TD	Int	Sck	Rtg	Att	Yds	Avg	Lng	TD	Total yds
2011	Louisville	191	296	2,129	64.5	14	**12**	**33**	132.4	**89**	66	0.7	**26**	**4**	2,195
2012	Louisville	287	419	3,718	68.5	27	8	28	160.5	74	26	0.4	17	1	3,744
2013	Louisville	**303**	**427**	**3,970**	**71.0**	**31**	4	28	**169.7**	63	**78**	**1.2**	20	1	**4,048**
Career		781	1,142	9,817	68.4	72	24	83	157.2	226	170	0.8	26	6	9,987

== Awards and honors ==
NFL

- Pepsi NFL Rookie of the Year (2014)
- Pro Bowl (2015)
- PFWA All-Rookie Team (2014)

College

- NCAA completion percentage leader (2013)
- First-team All-Big East (2012)
- Second-team All-AAC (2013)
- Big East Offensive Player of The Year (2012)
- Big East Rookie of the Year (2011)

== Coaching career ==
After the Lions' 2023 season ended with a loss to the San Francisco 49ers in the NFC Championship Game, Bridgewater formally confirmed his retirement from playing. He shortly thereafter was named the head coach for Miami Northwestern High School, his alma mater. In his first season, Bridgewater and Miami Northwestern won the Class 3A Florida High School Athletic Association state title.

In July 2025, Bridgewater was suspended from his position as head coach at Miami Northwestern for providing impermissible benefits to his players. These benefits included Uber rides, meals, and recovery services for the team, all being funded by Bridgewater himself. In May 2026, the "Teddy Bridgewater Act" became law in Florida, which allows high school head coaches to spend up to $15,000 of their own money, per year, on their teams.

=== Head coaching record ===
Year	Team	Overall	Conference	Standing	Bowl/playoffs
Miami Northwestern Bulls (Greater Miami Athletic Conference) (2024)
2024	Miami Northwestern	12–2	3–0	1st	W FHSAA Class 3A Championship
Miami Northwestern:		12–2	3–0		
Total:		12–2			

== Personal life ==
Bridgewater grew up in Miami as the youngest of four children to a single mother. He is a Christian. Bridgewater graduated from the University of Louisville with a degree in Sports Administration after the 2013 college football season. His mother, Rose, is a breast cancer survivor. In 2014, soon after Bridgewater was drafted by the Vikings, Cadillac presented a pink Escalade to Rose when they learned that he had wanted to get her one ever since he was in the third grade.
