= Torrian Wilson =

American football player (born 1991)

Profile
- Position: Guard

Personal information
- Born: November 28, 1991 (age 34); Miami, Florida, U.S.
- Listed height: 6 ft 2 in (1.88 m)
- Listed weight: 310 lb (141 kg)

Career information
- High school: Miami (FL) Northwestern
- College: UCF (2010-2014)
- NFL draft: 2015: undrafted

Career history
- Detroit Lions (2015)*; New England Patriots (2015)*; Orlando Predators (2016)*
- * Offseason or practice squad member only

Awards and highlights
- Second-team All-AAC (2014); Second-team All-C-USA (2012); C-USA All-Freshman Team (2011)

Torrian Wilson (born November 28, 1991) is an American former football guard. He played college football at UCF. After not being selected in the 2015 NFL draft, he was signed by the Detroit Lions as an undrafted free agent. Wilson is also a lineman trainer and is actively working with NFL, high school, and college recruits.

== Early life ==
Torrian Wilson was born in Miami, Florida, to Earnest and Vernell Wilson. He attended Miami Northwestern Senior High School, where he played both offense and defense for head football coach Billy Rolle. He was a first-team all-state pick and an All-Dade County selection. At the end of his senior season he was selected to play in the 2010 Under Armour All-America Game. Considered a four-star recruit by Rivals.com, Wilson was the eighth ranked offensive guard in the nation. He was recruited by Alabama, UCF, Louisiana State, Louisville, Michigan and Stanford.

== College career ==
Wilson attended the University of Central Florida, where he redshirted his freshman year. In 2011, as a redshirt freshman, he appeared in 11 contests, started four games at left tackle and was selected to the C-USA All-Freshman Team. In his sophomore season he started all 14 games at left tackle and was selected to the All-C-USA Second-team. In 2013, he started 11 games at LT. As a senior, he started all 13 games at left tackle and was named to the All-AAC Second-team.

== Professional career ==
=== Detroit Lions ===
After not being selected in the 2015 NFL draft, Wilson was signed by the Detroit Lions as an undrafted free agent on May 7, 2015. He received a $11,000 signing bonus by the Lions. He was released by the team on September 5, 2015.

=== New England Patriots ===
On November 10, 2015, the New England Patriots signed Torrian Wilson to their practice squad. Wilson was released by the Patriots on January 13, 2016.

=== Orlando Predators ===
On March 9, 2016, Wilson was activated by the Orlando Predators.
