= Kendal Thompkins =

American football player (born 1989)

No. 6, 15, 13, 2, 16
- Position: Wide receiver

Personal information
- Born: September 16, 1989 (age 37); Miami, Florida, U.S.
- Listed height: 5 ft 10 in (1.78 m)
- Listed weight: 180 lb (82 kg)

Career information
- High school: Miami (FL) Northwestern Senior
- College: Miami (FL)
- NFL draft: 2013: undrafted

Career history
- Orlando Predators (2014–2016); Baltimore Brigade (2017); Tampa Bay Storm (2017); Jacksonville Sharks (2018); Washington Valor (2019)

Career AFL statistics
- Receptions: 161
- Receiving yards: 2,082
- Receiving TDs: 33
- Stats at ArenaFan.com

Kendal Thompkins (born September 16, 1989) is an American former football wide receiver. Thompkins was signed as an undrafted free agent by the Orlando Predators in 2014. Thompkins played college football at Miami.

== Early life ==
In 2007, Thompkins recorded 46 receptions, 839 receiving yards and team-best 14 receiving touchdowns in his Senior season and also playing for 2007 consensus national championship Miami Northwestern Senior High School football team. He was selected to inaugural Under Armour All-Star game He was ranked as the 76th best wide receiver and 83rd best overall player in state of Florida by Rivals.com. He was ranked as the 89th best wide receiver by ESPN and he was rated 209th overall player in nation by Scout.com. He was selected to PrepStar All-Southeast Region team.

College recruiting
Name	Hometown	School	Height	Weight	40^{‡}	Commit date
Kendal Thompkins; Wide Receiver	Miami, Florida	Miami Northwestern Senior High School	5 ft 10 in (1.78 m)	165 lb (75 kg)	4.5	Nov 8, 2007
Kendal Thompkins; Wide Receiver	Recruit ratings: Scout: Rivals:					
Overall recruit ranking: Scout: 209 (Wide Receiver) Rivals: -- National, 76 (Wide Receiver), 83 (FL)
‡ Refers to 40-yard dash; Note: In many cases, Scout, Rivals, 247Sports, On3, and ESPN may conflict in their listings of height, weight and 40 time.; In these cases, the average was taken. ESPN grades are on a 100-point scale.; Sources: "2008 Miami Football Recruiting Commits". Scout.; "Scout.com Team Recruiting Rankings". Scout.; "2008 Team Ranking". Rivals.com.

== College career ==
He played college football at the University of Miami. He finished college 14 receptions, 152 receiving yards and 3 receiving touchdowns.

== Professional career ==
=== Orlando Predators ===
In 2014, Thompkins signed with the Orlando Predators of the Arena Football League. Thompkins had 33 receiving touchdowns as of the 2015 Arena Football season. On July 5, 2016, Thompkins was placed on recallable reassignment.

=== Baltimore Brigade ===
On May 11, 2017, Thompkins was assigned to the Baltimore Brigade. On June 1, 2017, Thompkins was placed on recallable reassignment.

=== Tampa Bay Storm ===
On June 26, 2017, Thompkins was assigned to the Tampa Bay Storm. He was placed on reassignment on July 20, 2017.

=== Jacksonville Sharks ===
On April 30, 2018, Thompkins was activated by the Jacksonville Sharks of the National Arena League.

=== Washington Valor ===
On May 7, 2019, Thompkins was assigned to the Washington Valor.

== Personal life ==
His brother is New York Jets wide receiver Kenbrell Thompkins and his cousin is NFL receiver Antonio Brown.
