= Miami Northwestern Senior High School =

Coordinates: 25.8375968°N 80.2161594°W

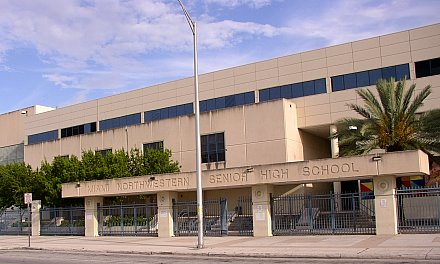
- Miami, Florida; United States

Information
- Type: Public, secondary
- Established: 1955
- School district: Miami-Dade County Public Schools
- Teaching staff: 70.00 (FTE)
- Grades: 9–12
- Enrollment: 1,429 (2023–2024)
- Student to teacher ratio: 20.41
- Colors: Blue, gold and white
- Nickname: Bulls
- Website: northwesternbulls.org

Miami Northwestern Senior High School is a public, four-year high school located in the Liberty City neighborhood of Miami, Florida in the United States. Affectionately known as "Da West," the school is one of only two of Miami's historically-Black high schools that remains open. In addition to being known for its storied football and track programs, Northwestern is home to several successful magnet programs that offer students training to prepare them for careers in the medical field and performing and visual arts. It boasts a large and loyal alumni base consisting of elected officials, educators, professional athletes, musicians, doctors, attorneys, pilots, filmmakers, etc. The student body is predominantly Black. The school's mascot is "Leroy the Bull" and its colors are royal blue and old gold. Some of its notable alumni include Congresswoman Frederica Wilson, history-making pilot Barrington Irving, Oscar-winning filmmaker Barry Jenkins, NFL quarterback Teddy Bridgewater and many more. Throughout his professional career, Bridgewater remained heavily involved with the school’s athletic programs - including serving as its head football coach, and leading the school to its ninth state championship in the 2024 season.

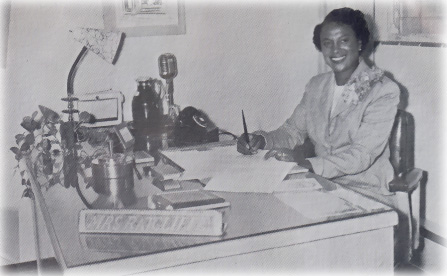
Ida Ratcliffe was appointed the first principal in August 1955.

== Academics ==
Northwestern has long been known for its academic challenges; however, the school has shown an unprecedented turn-around over the last several years. Since the implementation of the Florida School Accountability Report, Northwestern had received a "D" or "F" for the 12 consecutive years between 1998 and 2010, with four "F" grades in the 2001–02, 2002–03, 2006–07, and 2008–09 school years. During that time, Miami Northwestern was labeled one of the 163 "dropout factories" in the state of Florida by a Johns Hopkins University study of retention rates of students from their freshman to senior years. Using data from the 2004, 2005, and 2006 school years, the study found that 59% of entering freshman had dropped out or transferred before their senior year. Only 41% of the entering class had progressed to earn diplomas. As of the 2010–11 school year, the graduation rate had doubled to 81%.

In 2010–11, Miami Northwestern received a "B" on the School Accountability Report, the highest grade ever received by an inner-city school in Miami-Dade County. This improvement has been attributed in part to a major overhaul in school staff, and to an increased focus on college readiness and college-level courses. To further these efforts, Florida International University has partnered with Northwestern to help foster a successful community school. The initiative, funded by $1 million from JPMorgan Chase, will focus on increased dual-enrollment offerings, financial literacy, service learning, and the construction of an aquaponics laboratory at the school.

In 2015 Miami Northwestern finally received an "A" rating from the state of Florida.

== Demographics ==
In 2022, Miami Northwestern had a demographic breakdown of 90% Black, 9% Hispanic, and 1% White.

== Performing and Visual Arts Center magnet program ==
Marcy Sarmiento started the Performing and Visual Arts (PAVAC) magnet program at Miami Northwestern in 1975. The program was the starting point for PAVAC, the influential dual-enrollment joint program with Miami-Dade Community College in 1982, and became the New World School of the Arts. The Visual and Performing Arts magnets within the Miami-Dade county school system are competitive entry programs requiring a portfolio or audition, and are open to all students across the school system.

In January 2007, twenty students from Miami Northwestern High School's Performing and Visual Arts Center drama class were awarded "Best Florida Film" at the 2006 Ft. Lauderdale International Film Festival: High School Film Competition for their short film, directed by Jabari Payne, A New Love. Marcus Isaac, the film's producer and editor, was awarded the 2006 Miami Dade Mayor's Office of Film & Entertainment: Student Filmmaker Award. The students, members of the in-school CINEMA program of the Florida Film Institute, a non-profit organization mentoring more than 4,200 aspiring young filmmakers throughout Miami-Dade and Broward counties, screened their film at the Romance in a Can Film Festival in February 2007 at the Byron Carlyle Theatre on Miami Beach.

== Athletics ==
=== Controversy ===
On December 7, 2006, senior star running back of the football team Antwain Easterling was arrested and charged with lewd and lascivious battery on a minor for having sex with a fourteen-year-old girl in a bathroom at Miami Northwestern High School three months earlier. The girl's mother had reported the incident to three faculty members at the school in October 2006, and one of them reportedly informed the principal, Dwight Bernard. The proper authorities were not notified, and it did not come to the attention of Miami-Dade school police until the mother of the fourteen year-old asked an unknowing member of the police staff how the investigation was proceeding. Also arrested in the incident and charged with the same offense were Dante Maurice Jefferson and Vincent Shannon Jefferson.

After it was revealed that several members of the school's administration, faculty, and the football teams coaching staff knew about the incident and failed to report it, Miami-Dade Schools Superintendent Rudy Crew fired a total of twenty-one people including Miami Northwestern Principal Dwight Bernard, Head Football Coach Roland Smith and his entire staff, and many other school employees. In addition, athletics director Gregory Killings resigned. The football team was also placed on probation for one-year instead of having the entire 2007 season canceled. Bernard was indicted by a grand jury in March 2007 with official misconduct for covering up the incident. The grand jury report said school officials "allowed for the glory of football to trump the needs and safety" of the victim and that "priorities were chosen and the little girl lost." It was later reported that the mother of the young girl made contact with members of the school administration over 30 times but the incident was never reported to Miami-Dade police as required by state and federal law.

Easterling was allowed to enroll in a pretrial diversionary program which included 26 weeks of counseling sessions that would allow him to avoid prosecution and have the charges against him dismissed upon the completion of the program. Though he had been heavily recruited by schools like the University of Miami, the University of Florida, and Notre Dame these schools lost interest and walked away. He was finally recruited by The University of Southern Mississippi.

On April 20, 2010, a Miami-Dade jury found former Miami Northwestern Principal Dwight Bernard not guilty after the trial on the sex scandal coverup. During the trial, Bernard took the stand in his own defense and told the jury that he was ordered by school board members not to suspend Easterling. After his acquittal, Bernard sued the Miami Dade school board for $329,000.

=== Football ===
Prior to the 2007 season, the Miami Northwestern Bulls had won three class 6A state championships. In its third game of the 2007 football season, the Bulls, ranked No. 1 by USA Today, traveled to Dallas, Texas to take on the #2 nationally ranked Southlake Dragons. A crowd of 31,896 at Gerald J. Ford Stadium watched as Miami Northwestern won the contest 29-21, thereby ending Southlake's 49-game winning streak (tied Abilene for the longest in Texas high school football history). The Bulls then completed an undefeated season capping it off with a 41-0 win in the Florida 6A state championship game and being declared the mythical national champions by ESPN and USA Today.

In 2024, Miami Northwestern alumnus and NFL player Teddy Bridgewater led the Bulls to a Class 3A Florida High School Athletic Association state title.

=== Track and field ===
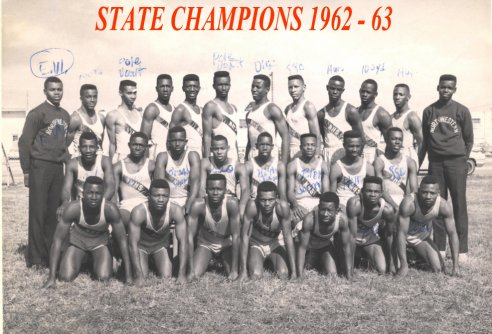
Miami Northwestern High School State Champions, 1962–63

The Bulls have also excelled in track and field, with the boys finishing in the top of the Florida state 4A track and field championships for 10 years in a row. In 2001, 2005, 2006, and 2007, the girls won the Florida High School Athletic Association's 4A track and field championship. In 2007–2008, in the 400 meter event, the girls swept 1st, 2nd, and 3rd with two freshman sprinters.

== Notable alumni ==
- Chatarius "Tutu" Atwell (2018) - wide receiver for the Los Angeles Rams
- Deandre Baker (2015) - NFL cornerback
- Teddy Bridgewater (2011) - Tampa Bay Buccaneers quarterback, former Miami Northwestern football head coach
- Artie Burns (2013) - cornerback for the Miami Dolphins
- Aaliyah Butler (2022) - track and field athlete
- Amari Cooper (2012) - wide receiver for the Buffalo Bills
- Torrie Cox (1999) - former NFL cornerback
- Lavonte David (2007) - linebacker for the Tampa Bay Buccaneers
- Marcus Forston (2008) - former NFL defensive tackle
- Anthony Gaitor (2007) - former NFL cornerback
- Jacory Harris (2008) - former quarterback in the CFL
- Barry Jenkins - Academy Award-winning filmmaker
- Calijah Kancey (2019) - professional football player for the Tampa Bay Buccaneers
- Kamren Kinchens (2021) - safety for the Los Angeles Rams
- Chamon Metayer (2021) – college football tight end for the Arizona State Sun Devils
- Snoop Minnis - former NFL wide receiver
- Nate Noel (2020) - NFL running back
- Patrick Payton (2021) - defensive end for the LSU Tigers
- Mickey Rivers - former baseball player for the California Angels, New York Yankees and Texas Rangers
- Dominique Rhymes (2011) - professional football player in the CFL
- George "Buster" Rhymes - former wide receiver for the Minnesota Vikings; name was inspiration for rapper Busta Rhymes
- Eli Rogers (2011) - former wide receiver for the Pittsburgh Steelers
- Brianna Rollins-McNeal - Olympic gold medalist hurdler
- Calvin Russell III (2026) – college football and college basketball player for the Syracuse Orange
- Jamari Sharpe (2022) – college football defensive back for the Indiana Hoosiers
- Sean Spence (2008) - former NFL linebacker
- Tommy Streeter (2008) - former NFL wide receiver
- Demetrius Taylor (2017) - professional football player for the Detroit Lions
- Twanisha Terry - Olympic gold medalist sprinter
- Kendal Thompkins (2008) - former professional arena football player
- Trick Daddy - rapper
- Trina (1992) - rapper
- Tray Walker (2011) - former cornerback for the Baltimore Ravens
- Brandon Washington - former NFL offensive tackle
- Rachad Wildgoose (2018) - cornerback for the Washington Commanders
- Divaad Wilson (2018) - cornerback for the New York Giants
- Torrian Wilson (2010) - former professional football player

== See also ==
- Miami-Dade County Public Schools
