= Brandon Washington =

American gridiron football player and coach (born 1988)

UCF Knights
- Title: Graduate assistant
- CFL status: International

Personal information
- Born: August 13, 1988 (age 38); Miami, Florida, U.S.
- Listed height: 6 ft 4 in (1.93 m)
- Listed weight: 325 lb (147 kg)

Career information
- Position: Offensive lineman (No. 70)
- High school: Miami (FL) Northwestern
- College: Miami (FL)
- NFL draft: 2012: 6th round, 200th overall pick

Career history

Playing
- Philadelphia Eagles (2012); St. Louis Rams (2012–2014); Hamilton Tiger-Cats (2016)*; Toronto Argonauts (2016–2018); Massachusetts Pirates (2019)
- * Offseason or practice squad member only

Coaching
- Florida Memorial (2020–2021) Offensive line coach; UCF (2022) Graduate assistant; Bethune Cookman (2023-Present) Offensive line coach

Awards and highlights
- First-team All-ACC (2010)

Career NFL statistics
- Games played: 1
- Stats at Pro Football Reference
- Stats at CFL.ca

Brandon Washington (born August 13, 1988) is an American former professional football offensive tackle and current coach. He was a member of the St. Louis Rams and Philadelphia Eagles of the National Football League (NFL), and the Toronto Argonauts and Hamilton Tiger-Cats of the Canadian Football League (CFL). He was selected in the sixth round of the 2012 NFL draft. He played college football at the University of Miami.

== College career ==
At the University of Miami, Washington was an All-ACC selection as a sophomore in 2010.

On December 16, 2011, Washington announced that he would forgo his senior season and enter the 2012 NFL draft.

== Professional career ==
=== Philadlephia Eagles ===
Washington was selected by the Philadelphia Eagles in the sixth round (200th overall) of the 2012 NFL draft. He signed a four-year contract with the team on May 11, 2012.

On August 31, 2012, the team released Washington as part of its final cuts.

=== Los Angeles Rams ===
After clearing waivers with the Eagles, Washington was signed to the Rams practice squad.

On December 31, 2012, Washington signed a two-year, $1,060,059 contract with the St. Louis Rams. He was waived on August 30, 2014.

=== Hamilton Tiger-Cats ===
On April 26, 2016, Washington signed as a free agent with the Hamilton Tiger-Cats of the Canadian Football League. He was released by the Tiger-Cats on June 14.

=== Toronto Argonauts ===
On September 19, 2016, Washington signed a practice roster agreement with the Toronto Argonauts of the Canadian Football League. On December 7, 2016, Washington re-signed with the Argonauts as a free agent. He played in 11 games with the team in 2017 and won a Grey Cup championship following the team's 105th Grey Cup victory. He played in seven games in 2018 before being released.

=== Massachusetts Pirates ===
On October 21, 2018, Washington signed with the Massachusetts Pirates of the National Arena League.

== Coaching career ==
In January 2020, Washington retired from playing, and joined the coaching staff at Florida Memorial as the offensive line coach.

In March 2022, Washington was announced as a graduate assistant for the UCF Knights football program, working with the offensive line alongside offensive line coach Herb Hand.

Following his time at UCF, Washington was announced as the offensive line coach at Bethune Cookman University, joining the inaugural staff of coach Raymond Woodie Jr.
