= Marcus Forston =

American football player (born 1989)

Profile
- Position: Defensive tackle

Personal information
- Born: September 28, 1989 (age 37); Miami, Florida, U.S.
- Listed height: 6 ft 3 in (1.91 m)
- Listed weight: 305 lb (138 kg)

Career information
- High school: Miami Northwestern
- College: Miami (FL)
- NFL draft: 2012: undrafted

Career history
- New England Patriots (2012–2013); St. Louis Rams (2015)*
- * Offseason or practice squad member only

Awards and highlights
- Freshman All-American (2008)

Career NFL statistics
- Total tackles: 3
- Stats at Pro Football Reference

Marcus Forston (born September 28, 1989) is an American former professional football player who was a defensive tackle in the National Football League (NFL). He played college football for the Miami Hurricanes. He was signed by the NFL's New England Patriots as an undrafted free agent in 2012.

== Early life ==
Forston was born in Miami and was a three-year starter at Miami Northwestern High School, where he helped lead Miami Northwestern towards back-to-back Florida 6A state championships.

Forston had a strong junior year in 2006 earning 92 tackles and 20 sacks. He played an instrumental part in Miami Northwestern's Florida 6A State championship. Forston was included to the Miami Herald's All-Dade 6A-4A Football team. Forston's older brother, Dustin, played college football at Ole Miss and FAU.

Forston entered into his senior year as a heavily sought-after recruit. Forston accounted for 72 tackles, earned 20 sacks, and forced 7 fumbles during his senior season at Miami Northwestern (2007), which often came while he was double or triple-teamed. Moreover, Forston sometimes lined up at tight end on goal-line situations (he caught one touchdown pass). Forston earned county and state honors for his play and was named to the Miami Herald's All Dade First-team and the State of Florida's All-State first-team. Forston also earned national recognition being named to several All-American teams, including USA Today, Parade, and EA Sports. Forston was chosen to represent East Team in the U.S. Army All-American game as a starter and was considered one of the best defensive tackles coming out of high school in 2008, earning comparisons to Warren Sapp. In 2010, Rivals.com called Forston—in retrospect—“maybe the best nose tackle prospect in the past five years.”

Forston was considered a five-star recruit by Rivals.com and was ranked the No. 1 defensive tackle in the nation. He chose Miami over Notre Dame, USC, Tennessee, and Alabama, calling Miami the "dream college right around the corner from my house."

== College career ==
Forston played as a true freshman in 2008 and was instrumental to the University of Miami's defensive rotation. During his freshman season, Forston recorded 17 tackles with 4.5 tackles for loss, and three quarterback sacks. Forston was given the nickname “Big Boom” by his teammates.

Forston subsequently earned multiple All-Freshman honors and was named to FWAA′s Freshman All-America team, College Football News′ All-Freshman first-team, and Rivals.com′s 2008 Freshman All-America team.

His sophomore season in 2009 was derailed by an ankle injury that kept Forston out for the season. Forston was thereby granted a medical redshirt for the 2009 season.

Forston came back strongly during the 2010 season registering 37 total tackles (16 solo and 21 assisted), 12 tackles for loss, three quarterback sacks, one interception and two passes defended. Forston's final season was cut short because of a season-ending knee injury against Bethune-Cookman. Forston subsequently decided to forgo his final season of eligibility and entered the NFL draft.

== Professional career ==
=== 2012 NFL draft ===
Forston entered the NFL Combine graded as the No. 15 prospect among defensive tackles. His workout performance was rather unimpressive compared to other defensive line prospects. Projected as a seventh-round selection by Sports Illustrated, Forston was ranked as the No. 24 defensive tackle available in the 2012 NFL draft. Forston was not selected in the 2012 NFL draft.

=== New England Patriots ===
Forston was signed as an undrafted free agent after the draft by the New England Patriots. Forston initially made the team, but was waived on September 26. He was then re-signed to the team's practice squad and was later activated by the New England Patriots. Forston played in one game during the season; a 31–30 week 3 loss to the Baltimore Ravens.

Forston was waived by the New England Patriots entering the 2013 season, but was later signed to their practice squad. Forston was re-signed by the New England Patriots after Vince Wilfork's season-ending injury. Forston registered one tackle for loss in 'New England's Week 6 30–27 win against the New Orleans Saints. Forston earned his first NFL start in New England's Week 7 30–27 loss to the New York Jets, registering two tackles, with one tackle for loss.

On August 21, 2014, Forston was released by the Patriots.

=== St. Louis Rams ===
After not being offered by any NFL team in 2014, Forston interrupted his football career and worked in security. A criminology major in college, he had offers to join the Miami Gardens Police Department and the Atlanta Police Department.

In early August 2015, the St. Louis Rams signed Forston for their off-season roster. On September 5, 2015, he was waived by the Rams.
