= Jacory Harris =

American football player (born 1990)

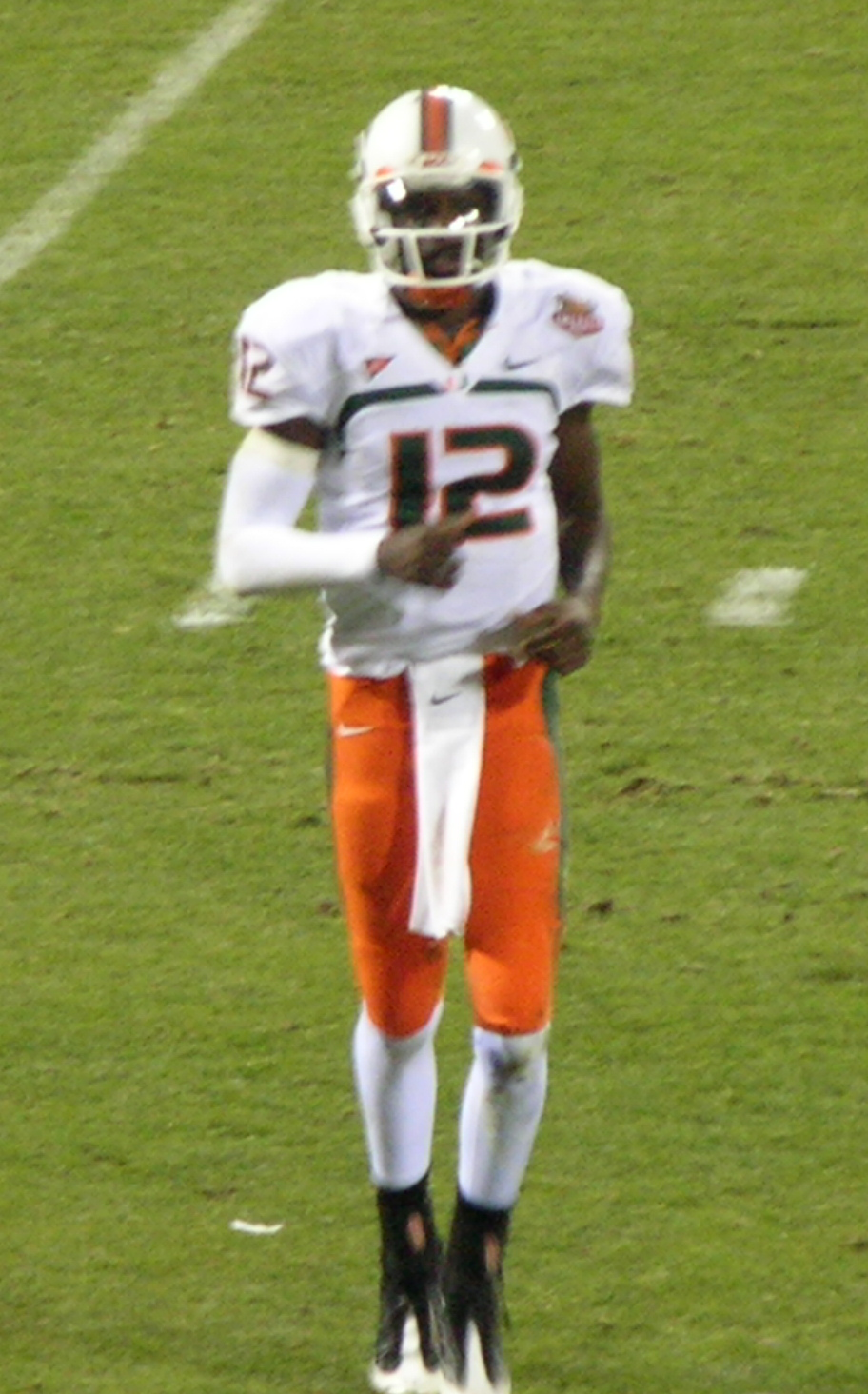
- Harris with the Miami Hurricanes at the 2008 Emerald Bowl

No. 12
- Position: Quarterback

Personal information
- Born: May 12, 1990 (age 36); Miami, Florida, U.S.
- Listed height: 6 ft 3 in (1.91 m)
- Listed weight: 203 lb (92 kg)

Career information
- High school: Miami Northwestern
- College: Miami (FL) (2008–2011)
- NFL draft: 2012: undrafted

Career history
- 2012: Philadelphia Eagles*
- 2013–2014: Edmonton Eskimos*
- 2014–2016: Hamilton Tiger-Cats
- 2017: Montreal Alouettes
- * Offseason or practice squad member only
- Stats at CFL.ca

Jacory Sherrod Harris (born May 12, 1990) is an American former professional football player who was a quarterback in the Canadian Football League (CFL). He played college football for the Miami Hurricanes.

Harris started for Miami Northwestern Senior High School during his last two years; he was unbeaten (30–0) and led the team to two state championships. In his senior year, Harris broke the state record for passing touchdowns and won the 2007 High School Football National Championship. He was named Florida's Mr. Football. During his freshman year of college with Miami in 2008, he split time with Robert Marve in a two-quarterback system. After the Emerald Bowl in late December, Marve transferred to Purdue, effectively making Harris the undisputed starter for the rest of his career as a Hurricane. He signed with the Philadelphia Eagles as an undrafted free agent in May 2012.

== Early life ==
Harris attended Miami Northwestern High School, located in Liberty City, Miami, Florida. He became the starting quarterback for the Northwestern Bulls football team as a junior in 2006. That year, he would lead Northwestern to an undefeated season and its third state championship while completing 275-of-425 passes for 3,542 yards, 35 touchdowns, and six interceptions. As a senior in 2007, under his leadership, the team went on to another undefeated season and state title, as well as the high school football national championship.

During his senior year, he completed 222-of-333 attempts (67% completion rate) for 3,445 yards, with 49 touchdowns and only six interceptions. In total, Harris finished with a 30–0 record as a starting quarterback in high school. Harris was awarded a Class 6A first-team all-state selection, the Mr. Football Award (Florida), and Class 6A Player of the Year. Harris attended the 2007 Elite 11 football camp and was ranked as the seventh best pocket-passer quarterback in the nation.

== College career ==
=== 2008 season ===
Harris chose to attend the University of Miami, where he competed for the starting quarterback position with former Mr. Florida award winner Robert Marve for the Miami Hurricanes. Harris and Marve split time as starters, with Marve starting 11 of 13 games. Marve subsequently transferred out of Miami, leaving Harris the full-time starter heading into the 2009 season. During the 2008 season, Harris led Miami on two comeback drives against Duke and Virginia. Harris finished the season with 1,195 yards, 12 touchdowns, and seven interceptions as the Hurricanes wound up 7–6.

In a July 31, 2009, interview with Dan Le Batard, Harris told the world that he will pick up his Heisman Trophy wearing a pink suit and with a "pimp cup" in hand. He also earned himself a new nickname in this interview: Afro Butterfly.

=== 2009 season ===
During the first game of his sophomore season against #18 Florida State, Harris went 21-of-34 for 386 passing yards (a career-high and 10th highest in school history) with two touchdowns and also ran for a score in Miami's 38–34 upset road victory. Harris managed just 122 of his 386 passing yards after a tough hit from FSU's blitzing cornerback Greg Reid with 11:45 left to play, which left his right arm numb until the next drive.

In the second game of the 2009 season versus the Yellow Jackets at home, Harris completed 20-of-25 passes for 270 yards and three touchdowns—and the 20th-ranked Hurricanes snapped a four-game losing streak against #14 Georgia Tech with a 33–17 victory on September 17, 2009.

In the third game of the season against conference rival Virginia Tech, Harris struggled, throwing for nine completions out of 25 passing attempts, 150 yards, and no touchdowns in a 31–7 loss. The Hurricanes were #9 headed into the game, but dropped to #17 in the polls.

In the fourth game versus the highly favored Oklahoma Sooners, Harris started the game off throwing two interceptions, then finished 19-for-28 with 202 yards passing and three touchdowns. The 21–20 win brought Miami back up to #11 in the polls.

In the fifth game versus Florida A&M on October 10, Harris went 16-for-24 passing for 217 yards and two touchdowns in a 48–16 win. The Hurricanes moved back up to #9 in the AP Poll.

In the sixth game of the season, Harris threw for 293 yards and a touchdown. The Miami Hurricanes went on to beat the UCF Knights, 27–7. Miami moved up one spot in the AP Poll.

In a losing effort in overtime versus the Clemson Tigers, Harris put up 256 passing yards, two touchdowns, and three interceptions. In overtime, after a 20-yard Graig Cooper run, Harris and the Hurricane offense failed to push in the possible game-winning touchdown. The Hurricanes lost 40–37. The loss also put Miami down to #19 in the AP Poll and out of the BCS Standings.

In an ACC matchup against the Wake Forest Demon Deacons, Harris went 22-for-44, 330 yards passing, three touchdowns, and one pick. On a key 4th-and-16 on the Hurricanes final game-winning drive, Harris found Aldarius Johnson on a finger-tip catch which kept the drive alive. Harris sealed the 28–27 victory for "The U" off a 13-yard touchdown pass to Travis Benjamin. The Hurricanes moved up to #16 in the polls.

The ninth game brought a change for the BCS 17th-ranked Hurricanes, as a 24–17 halftime lead against the Virginia Cavaliers broke into a dominant second half. Miami outscored Virginia 28–0 to defeat the Cavaliers 52–17. Harris went 18-of-31 with 232 yards, two touchdown passes, and one interception. The previously struggling Miami defense was not to blame for the allowed points, however, as two special teams miscues leading to two blocked punts brought 14 points to Virginia. The tide-turning play: a 66-yard punt-return by sophomore WR Thearon Collier that brought seven points for the Hurricanes.

Harris and the rest of the Miami Hurricanes went up to Chapel Hill to take on the North Carolina Tar Heels. Harris went 28-for-50, 319 yards, one touchdown and four interceptions. The Hurricanes lost 33–24 and went from #14 to #21 and were out of contention for the ACC Championship and a BCS bowl game bid.

In the final game at home for the Hurricanes against the Duke Blue Devils on November 21, Harris went 25-for-43, 348 yards passing, two touchdowns, and one interception. The Hurricanes scored three unanswered touchdowns in the second half. Linebacker Darryl Sharpton sealed the win with a 73-yard interception return. Miami won the game by a score of 34–16.

As a sophomore, Harris led Miami to a 9–4 record and a #19 ranking from the AP poll while throwing for 3,352 yards, 24 touchdowns, and a pass efficiency rating of 140.09.

=== 2010 season ===
The #13 Hurricanes had to face a schedule that included difficult games in September such as their September 11 matchup with preseason nationally ranked No. 2 Ohio State.

As a junior, Harris started the first eight games of the year before a concussion sidelined him for three games, forcing true freshman Stephen Morris to pick up the slack. The Miami Hurricanes finished with a record of 7–6 as their head coach, Randy Shannon, was fired near the season's end on November 27, 2010.

Harris opened the season going 12-of-15 passing for 210 yards and three touchdowns as the Hurricanes defeated Florida A&M, 45–0, on September 2. He completed 21-of-32 passes for 248 yards and two touchdowns in Miami's 31–3 win over Pittsburgh on September 23.

Harris was 17-of-34 passing for 224 yards with a touchdown pass and another score off a 13-yard run in Miami's 28–13 road win on October 16 over Duke. A week later Miami fell behind 10–7 in the 2nd quarter at home against the North Carolina Tarheels. Harris directed the 'Canes to 23 unanswered points as he completed 21-of-32 passes for 217 yards and three touchdowns in the contest, winning 30–10.

=== 2011 season ===
On August 25, 2011, Harris was ruled ineligible to play the first game of the 2011 season for his involvement with the Nevin Shapiro scandal. Quarterback Stephen Morris started, losing to Maryland on September 5, 2011. Harris then returned after the suspension and threw two touchdown passes along with two interceptions in a 24–6 win against Ohio State.

Harris threw for 271 yards on September 24, 2011, against the nationally ranked No. 15 Kansas St. Wildcats in a losing effort, 28–24, as he completed 21-of-31 passes for two touchdowns. Harris was stopped short of the goal line on a quarterback sneak as the game clock expired.

On October 8, the Hurricanes came up short against 17th-ranked Virginia Tech, 38–35. Harris was 13-for-21 passing the ball for 267 yards with three touchdowns, including a 77-yard touchdown pass to wide receiver Travis Benjamin against the Hokies.

On October 15 as the Hurricanes jumped out to a 27–10 halftime lead and claimed a 30–24 victory in Chapel Hill, N.C against a 5–1 North Carolina Tarheel team. The senior quarterback completed 20-of-30 passes for 267 yards with three touchdowns. Harris completed 14-of-20 passes for 202 yards and three touchdowns against the Duke Blue Devils. He also had 22 yards on four rushes as Miami won 49–14.

In a 28–21 loss to Virginia (the Cavaliers finished 8–5 in 2011), Harris went 21-of-30 for a season best 311 passing yards and three touchdowns, including one of those going for 51 yards to wide receiver Tommy Streeter in the third quarter. He also rushed six times for 22 yards in this October 27 matchup with the Cavaliers. Miami came up short in a November 12 loss to ACC rival Florida St., 23–19. Harris went 20-for-31 passing the ball for 225 yards with one touchdown. Harris also rushed six times for 31 yards against the 23rd-ranked Seminoles.

In Harris's final collegiate game, he threw four interceptions in a 24–17 loss to Boston College.

Despite Miami being eligible for a bowl game with a 6–6 record, the university forfeited their bowl bid after having to deal with the fallout of the Nevin Shapiro scandal.

Harris ended his senior season completing 195-of-300 passes (65.0 percent) for 2,486 yards, 20 touchdowns, and nine interceptions. For his career at Miami, he had 8,826 passing yards, 70 touchdowns, and a pass efficiency rating of 135.0.

== Professional career ==
=== NFL ===
Pre-draft measurables
Height	Weight	Arm length	Hand span	40-yard dash	10-yard split	20-yard split	20-yard shuttle	Three-cone drill	Vertical jump	Broad jump
6 ft 3 in (1.91 m)	203 lb (92 kg)	32 1/8 in (0.82 m)	9 3/4 in (0.25 m)	4.72 s	1.63 s	2.72 s	4.40 s	7.10 s	37.0 in (0.94 m)	9 ft 5 in (2.87 m)
All values from NFL Combine

Harris was not drafted in the 2012 NFL draft. After the draft, he received an invitation to the Miami Dolphins' training camp. He signed with the Philadelphia Eagles on May 11, 2012, but was waived on May 21.

=== Edmonton Eskimos ===
Following his time in the United States, Harris came north to Canada and joined the Edmonton Eskimos of the Canadian Football League (CFL) on February 6, 2013. After spending the 2013 season on the practice roster Harris was released by the club on June 15, 2014.

=== Hamilton Tiger-Cats ===
On July 13, 2014, Harris signed with the Hamilton Tiger-Cats. In the 2015 season he appeared in three games for the Ti-Cats completing 13 of 23 pass attempts for 160 yards. Following the season he was not re-signed by the Tiger-Cats and became a free-agent.

=== Montreal Alouettes ===
Harris signed with the Montreal Alouettes (CFL) on February 14, 2017. During the 2017 preseason Harris completed 15 of 23 pass attempts for 163 yards.

== Career statistics ==
=== CFL ===
		Passing									Rushing
Year	Team	Games	Started	Comp	Att	Pct	Yards	TD	Int	Rating	Att	Yards	Avg	Long	TD
2015	HAM	3	1	13	23	56.5	160	0	0	78.2	1	7	7.0	7	0
CFL totals		1	0	13	23	56.5	160	0	0	78.2	1	7	7.0	7	0

=== College ===
Year	Team	Passing							Rushing			
Year	Team	GP	CMP	ATT	CMP%	YDS	TD	INT	ATT	YDS	AVG	TD
2008	Miami	13	118	194	60.8	1,195	12	7	45	101	2.2	2
2009	Miami	13	242	406	59.6	3,352	24	17	48	−219	−4.6	1
2010	Miami	10	148	270	54.8	1,793	14	15	29	27	0.9	2
2011	Miami	11	195	300	65.0	2,486	20	9	53	88	1.7	0
Totals		47	703	1,170	60.1	8,826	70	48	175	-3	0.0	5

== Personal life ==
Harris is currently a firefighter for the Miami-Dade Fire Rescue Department, a job he began in July 2020 after graduating from the Miami-Dade Fire Academy.
