= Tommy Streeter =

American football player (born 1989)

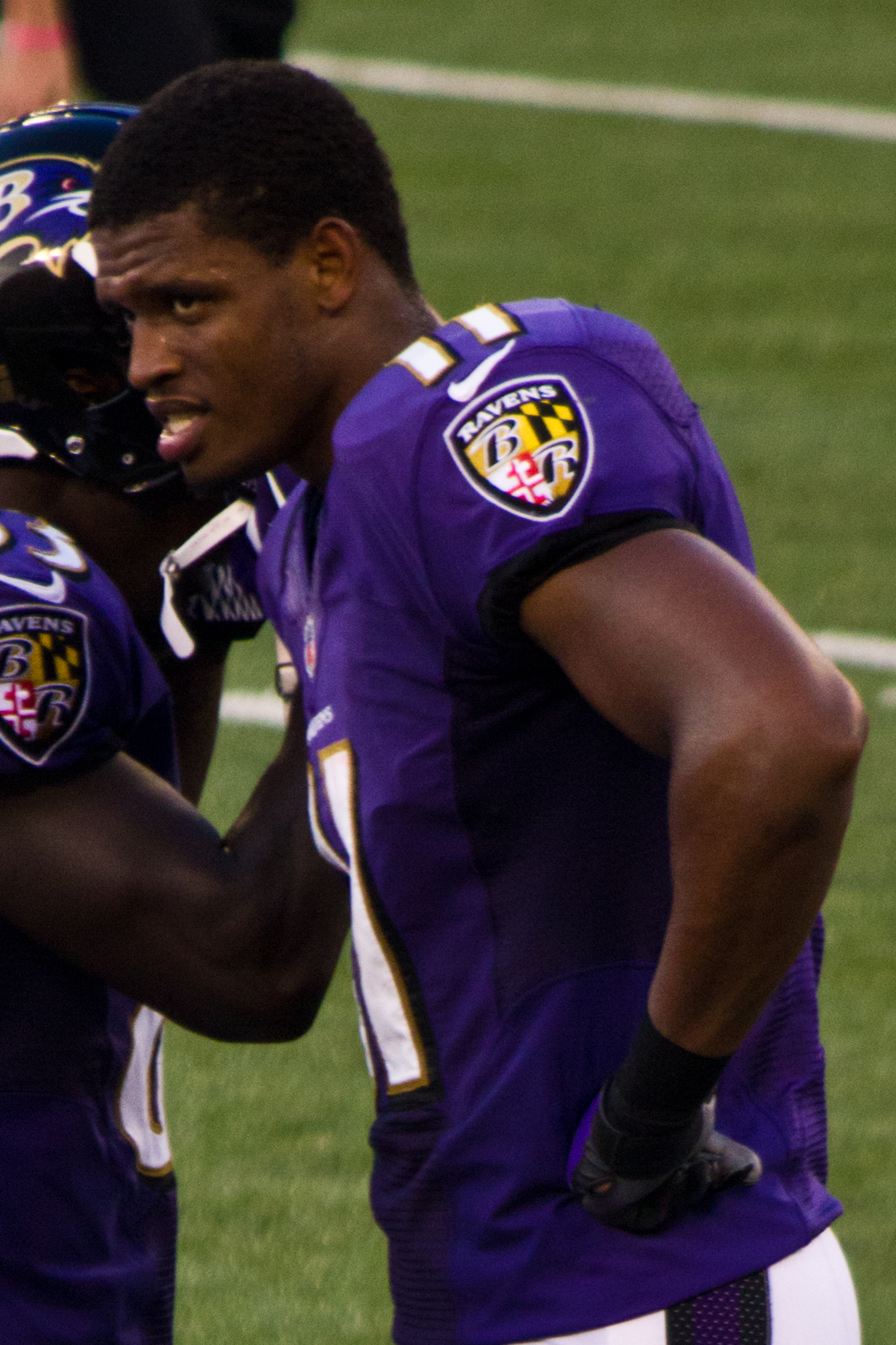
- Streeter with the Baltimore Ravens in 2012

No. 11, 13
- Position: Wide receiver

Personal information
- Born: October 7, 1989 (age 37); Miami, Florida, U.S.
- Listed height: 6 ft 5 in (1.96 m)
- Listed weight: 219 lb (99 kg)

Career information
- High school: Miami Northwestern Senior
- College: Miami (FL)
- NFL draft: 2012: 6th round, 198th overall pick

Career history
- Baltimore Ravens (2012); Buffalo Bills (2013)*; Tampa Bay Buccaneers (2013–2014)*; Miami Dolphins (2014)*; Jacksonville Jaguars (2014); Miami Dolphins (2015)*; Hamilton Tiger-Cats (2016)*; Saskatchewan Roughriders (2016)*
- * Offseason or practice squad member only

Awards and highlights
- Super Bowl champion (XLVII)
- Stats at Pro Football Reference

Tommy Streeter, Jr. (born October 7, 1989) is an American former professional football wide receiver. He played college football at the University of Miami and was selected by the Baltimore Ravens in the sixth round of the 2012 NFL draft, with whom he won Super Bowl XLVII.

== College career ==
As a junior, Streeter led the Miami Hurricanes in receptions with 46, 811 receiving yards, and eight touchdowns. On December 5, 2011, he announced that he would forgo his senior season and enter the 2012 NFL draft.

== Professional career ==
Pre-draft measurables
Height	Weight	Arm length	Hand span	40-yard dash	10-yard split	20-yard split	20-yard shuttle	Three-cone drill	Vertical jump	Broad jump	Bench press
6 ft 4 7/8 in (1.95 m)	219 lb (99 kg)	34 3/4 in (0.88 m)	9 1/2 in (0.24 m)	4.40 s	1.55 s	2.62 s	4.36 s	7.08 s	33.0 in (0.84 m)	10 ft 5 in (3.18 m)	17 reps
All values from NFL Combine/Pro Day

=== Baltimore Ravens ===
Streeter was selected to the Baltimore Ravens in the sixth round, 198th overall, of the 2012 NFL draft. On August 31, 2012, he was placed on Injured Reserve because of a foot injury.

On August 25, 2013, he was waived by the Ravens.

=== Tampa Bay Buccaneers ===
On September 1, 2013, he signed with the Tampa Bay Buccaneers as a member of their practice squad. The Buccaneers released Streeter on August 24, 2014.

=== Miami Dolphins (first stint) ===
On August 31, 2014, he signed with the Miami Dolphins as a member of their practice squad. He was released on September 23, 2014, to make room for Marcus Thigpen.

=== Jacksonville Jaguars ===
On September 29, 2014, he signed to the Jacksonville Jaguars practice squad. On November 29, 2014, he was promoted to their active roster after waiving wide receiver Mike Brown.

=== Miami Dolphins (second stint) ===
On June 8, 2015, he signed with the Dolphins. However, after being put on injured reserve, he was waived on August 15, 2015.

=== Hamilton Tiger-Cats ===
On August 25, 2016, Streeter signed with the Hamilton Tiger-Cats of the Canadian Football League (CFL).

=== Saskatchewan Roughriders ===
Streeter was part of a four-player trade in October 2016 which saw him traded to the Saskatchewan Roughriders.
