= 2009 Miami Hurricanes football team =

American college football season

2009 Miami Hurricanes football

Champs Sports Bowl, L 14–20 vs. Wisconsin
- Conference: Atlantic Coast Conference
- (Coastal)

Ranking
- Coaches: No. 19
- AP: No. 19
- Record: 9–4 (5–3 ACC)
- Head coach: Randy Shannon (3rd season)
- Offensive coordinator: Mark Whipple (1st season)
- Offensive scheme: Pro-style
- Defensive coordinator: John Lovett (1st season)
- Base defense: 4–3, Cover 2
- Home stadium: Land Shark Stadium (Capacity: 74,916)

2009 Atlantic Coast Conference football standings
	Conf.			Overall
Team	W		L	W		L
Atlantic Division
No. 24 Clemson x	6	–	2	9	–	5
Boston College	5	–	3	8	–	5
Florida State	4	–	4	7	–	6
Wake Forest	3	–	5	5	–	7
NC State	2	–	6	5	–	7
Maryland	1	–	7	2	–	10
Coastal Division
No. 13 Georgia Tech * x$	7	–	1	11	–	3
No. 10 Virginia Tech	6	–	2	10	–	3
No. 19 Miami (FL)	5	–	3	9	–	4
North Carolina *	0	–	4	0	–	5
Duke	3	–	5	5	–	7
Virginia	2	–	6	3	–	9
Championship: Georgia Tech 39, Clemson 34
$ – BCS representative as conference champion; North Carolina vacated 8 wins, including 4 ACC wins.; Rankings from AP Poll

The 2009 Miami Hurricanes football team represented the University of Miami during the 2009 NCAA Division I FBS football season. It was the Hurricanes' 84th season of football and 6th as a member of the Atlantic Coast Conference. The Hurricanes were led by third-year head coach Randy Shannon and played their home games at Land Shark Stadium. They finished the season 9–4 overall and 5–3 in the ACC to finish in third place in the Coastal Division. They were invited to the Champs Sports Bowl where they lost to Wisconsin, 20–14.

== Pre-season ==
In the offseason three quarterbacks transferred, including last season's starter Robert Marve. The moves left sophomore Jacory Harris as the starter and true freshman A.J. Highsmith as the backup. The Hurricanes' staff also saw turnover, with a new offensive coordinator Mark Whipple, known for his pro-style offense and a new defensive coordinator, John Lovett.

On December 29, 2008, Miami fired offensive coordinator and quarterbacks coach Patrick Nix, two days after the Emerald Bowl. The following day, redshirt freshman quarterback Robert Marve, who had been suspended from the Emerald Bowl due to academic reasons, was granted conditional release from his scholarship and announced he would be transferring. Marve had started 11 of 13 games for Miami in 2008, and his transfer would result in true freshman Jacory Harris officially becoming the team's starting quarterback for 2009. Harris had played in all 13 games in 2008, starting in two of them.

On January 20, 2009, defensive coordinator Bill Young announced his leaving Miami to become the defensive coordinator of his alma mater, Oklahoma State University. This left Shannon with the task of having to replace two coordinators in the same off-season.

Shannon made the first hire on January 27, when Mark Whipple was hired to be the team's new offensive coordinator and quarterbacks coach, as well as being named assistant head coach. On February 12, John Lovett was hired as the team's new defensive coordinator.

Miami began spring practice on February 24, and held their spring game on March 28.

Practice for the fall began on August 8. Several injuries occurred during practices; defensive end Adewale Ojomo suffered a broken jaw during a locker room incident that could have kept him out of the whole season. Defensive end Eric Moncur visited a specialist in Philadelphia on August 19 to have a groin injury examined and was held out of some practices, while defensive end Gavin Hardin was held out of camp with an unknown injury.

On August 25, backup quarterbacks Taylor Cook and Cannon Smith both announced that they had requested and obtained a release for transfer to other schools. This left true freshman A.J. Highsmith as the second team backup to Jacory Harris.

=== Roster changes ===
Starting tight end Dedrick Epps suffered a torn ACL in practices leading up to the Emerald Bowl in December 2008, keeping him out of spring practice. Jimmy Graham, a former forward on the Miami basketball team, announced in April that he would be joining the football team for the 2009 season as a tight end. Graham had not played football since high school.

Due to lack of depth at the cornerback position, receiver Sam Shields and safety Ryan Hill were moved to cornerback before the start of spring, where they would remain for 2009. Defensive end Allen Bailey was moved permanently to defensive tackle, and safety CJ Holton was moved from safety to linebacker. Several players from 2008 either transferred or left the team, including quarterback Robert Marve, receiver Jermaine McKenzie, running back Shawnbrey McNeal, and offensive lineman Christopher Barney.

On February 6, Miami announced its 2009 recruiting class, of which there were 19 members, and six of whom were early enrollees who participated in spring practice. Two signees failed to qualify: offensive tackle Malcolm Bunche and defensive back Prince Kent.

=== Recruiting class of 2009 ===
Name	Pos	Ht	Wt	Hometown	High school/prep school/junior college
Ray Ray Armstrong	S	6-4	218	Sanford, Florida	Sanford Seminole HS
Malcolm Bunche	OT	6-6	315	Newark, Delaware	Newark HS
Dyron Dye	DE	6-4	215	Sanford, Florida	Sanford Seminole HS
Shayon Green	LB	6-2	225	Tifton, Georgia	Tifton County HS
A.J. Highsmith	QB	6-0	186	Ft. Bend, Texas	Hightower HS
Mike James	RB	5-11	211	Davenport, Florida	Davenport Ridge HS
Jermaine Johnson	OT	6-6	309	Ft. Lauderdale, Florida	St. Thomas Aquinas HS/Hargrave Military Academy
Prince Kent	S	6-3	195	Norcross, Georgia	Norcross HS
Brandon McGee	CB	5-11	186	Lauderhill, Florida	Plantation HS
Lamar Miller	RB	5-11	205	Miami, Florida	Killian HS
Stephen Plein	TE	6-6	240	Ft. Myers, Florida	Ft. Myers HS
Curtis Porter	DT	6-2	334	Charlotte, North Carolina	Victory Christian HS
Jamal Reid	CB	6-1	175	Mayo, Florida	Lafayette HS
Luther Robinson	DT	6-3	280	Ft. Pierce, Florida	Westwood HS
Billy Sanders	TE	6-4	235	Coeur d'Alene, Idaho	Lake City HS
Olivier Vernon	DE	6-3	239	Miami, Florida	American HS
Brandon Washington	OG	6-5	330	Miami, Florida	Northwestern HS/Milford Prep
Jared Wheeler	OG	6-5	310	Plantation, Florida	American Heritage HS
Cory White	OT	6-4	225	Jacksonville, Florida	Fleming Island HS

== Schedule ==
Date	Time	Opponent	Rank	Site	TV	Result	Attendance
September 7	8:00 pm	at No. 18 Florida State		Doak Campbell Stadium; Tallahassee, FL (rivalry)	ESPN	W 38–34	81,077
September 17	7:30 pm	No. 14 Georgia Tech	No. 20	Land Shark Stadium; Miami Gardens, FL	ESPN	W 33–17	45,329
September 26	3:30 pm	at No. 11 Virginia Tech	No. 9	Lane Stadium; Blacksburg, VA (rivalry)	ABC/ESPN	L 7–31	66,233
October 3	8:00 pm	No. 8 Oklahoma*	No. 17	Land Shark Stadium; Miami Gardens, FL	ABC/ESPN	W 21–20	61,790
October 10	7:00 pm	Florida A&M*	No. 11	Land Shark Stadium; Miami Gardens, FL	ESPN360	W 48–16	47,859
October 17	7:30 pm	at UCF*	No. 9	Bright House Networks Stadium; Orlando, FL	CBSSN	W 27–7	48,453
October 24	3:30 pm	Clemson	No. 8	Land Shark Stadium; Miami Gardens, FL	ABC/ESPN	L 37–40 ^{OT}	43,778
October 31	3:30 pm	at Wake Forest	No. 18	BB&T Field; Winston-Salem, NC	ABC/ESPN2	W 28–27	30,011
November 7	12:00 pm	Virginia^{†}	No. 16	Land Shark Stadium; Miami Gardens, FL	Raycom	W 52–17	48,350
November 14	3:30 pm	at North Carolina	No. 12	Kenan Memorial Stadium; Chapel Hill, NC	ABC/ESPN	L 24–33	57,500
November 21	12:00 pm	Duke	No. 21	Land Shark Stadium; Miami Gardens, FL	ESPNU	W 34–16	38,200
November 28	3:30 pm	at South Florida*	No. 19	Raymond James Stadium; Tampa, FL	ABC/ESPN	W 31–10	66,469
December 29	8:00 pm	vs. No. 24 Wisconsin*	No. 14	Florida Citrus Bowl; Orlando, FL (Champs Sports Bowl)	ESPN	L 14–20	56,747
*Non-conference game; ^{†}Homecoming; Rankings from AP Poll released prior to the game; All times are in Eastern time

== Regular season ==
=== #19 Florida State ===
	1	2	3	4	Total
Miami	7	7	3	21	38
#19 Florida State	7	3	13	11	34

The Hurricanes' first game was against Florida State. The lead changed seven times during the game, and Miami won 38–34. The outcome was in doubt until the final play of the game when a pass from Florida State quarterback Christian Ponder bounced incomplete in the Hurricanes' end zone. Miami quarterback Jacory Harris, in only his third career start, completed 21 of 34 passes for 386 yards and 2 touchdowns against 2 interceptions. In the process, Harris set the record for most passing yards by a Miami quarterback against Florida State. Harris also rushed for a touchdown.

A seesaw first half saw the Hurricanes take a 14–10 lead to the locker room on the strength of a 39-yard touchdown pass from Harris to Travis Benjamin and a 6-yard touchdown run by Javarris James. In the third quarter, Florida State outscored Miami 13–3 to take a 23–17 lead heading into a back-and-forth fourth quarter.

Harris put the Hurricanes back in front early in the fourth with a 1-yard touchdown off a quarterback sneak, but the lead was short-lived. On the Hurricanes' next possession, Harris was hit as he released the ball and was intercepted by defensive end Markus White, who returned the interception 31 yards for a Florida State touchdown. Florida State then successfully converted a two-point attempt, making up for an earlier missed extra point, and took a 31–24 lead. Harris responded by orchestrating a 10-play, 73-yard drive that culminated with a 24-yard game-tying touchdown pass to Graig Cooper. Florida State then came back ahead with a 44-yard field goal. Losing by 3, Miami took possession with 4 minutes 11 seconds remaining and after a series of short gains, crossed into Florida State territory. On second-and-five from the Florida State 43-yard line, Harris threw a 40-yard pass to Benjamin, who was able to get behind double coverage, catch the ball in stride near the left sideline, and get one foot down before his momentum took him out of bounds at the 3. Cooper rushed 3 yards for a touchdown on the next play, putting the Hurricanes back in front, 38–34, with less than 2 minutes to play.

A 15-yard penalty for excessive celebration and a short kickoff allowed Florida State to start its final drive at the Miami 49-yard line. A 30-yard rush by Ponder on third-and-three gave Florida State a first down from the Miami 12-yard line, and an 8-yard pass brought Florida State down to the Miami 4-yard line. After Ponder was stopped in the backfield for a 1-yard loss on second down and Miami was called for pass interference on third down, Florida State was set up with first-and-goal at the Miami 2-yard line with 14 seconds remaining. The Miami defense, however, made a goal line stand and forced two successive incompletions, both intended for Jarmon Fortson. With 5 seconds remaining, Florida State had time for one play. Ponder took the snap from the shotgun formation, rolled right, and, under pressure, fired a low pass to Fortson, who was unable to corral the ball before it short-hopped off the end zone turf as time expired.

In recognition of their performances, Harris was named ACC Offensive Back of the Week and Brandon Harris was selected as ACC Defensive Back of the Week.

=== #13 Georgia Tech ===
	1	2	3	4	Total
#13 Georgia Tech	3	0	7	7	17
#20 Miami	7	10	16	0	33

Ten days after their win over Florida State, Miami faced off against Georgia Tech, who had won four consecutive games against the Hurricanes. the previous season, the Hurricanes gave up 472 yards on the ground (most given up by the school since 1944) in a loss 41–23, removing them from ACC Championship contention. Georgia Tech won the coin toss and settled for a 32-yard field goal. Miami then proceeded to score on their first three possessions (Harris threw a 40-yard throw to WR LaRon Byrd, 18-yard throw to TE Dedrick Epps and Matt Bosher converted a FG). The Hurricanes led 17–3 at the end of the half.

Javarris James controlled the opening Hurricane drive of the half, first catching a ball for three yards, running for 14, 6 and then 3 to score. The Yellow Jackets' Anthony Allen also had a 3-yard after Georgia Tech QB Josh Nesbitt threw a 39-yard pass to WR Demaryius Thomas. Harris threw his third TD of the night, this time to TE Jimmy Graham for a 31–13 score and the resulting kickoff by Alex Uribe resulted in good field position for the Hurricanes' defense. Restricted by their own 23, Georgia Tech lost 23 yards, which resulted in a safety. The fourth quarter featured the Hurricanes running the ball and Bosher missed FGs for 26 and 31. Newsbitt threw his only TD pass of the night to Thomas for 56 yards. With the 33–17 win, for the first time since 1988, Miami opened their season with back-to-back wins against ranked opponents.

The school improved to 14–2 overall and 10–0 at home on Thursday nights. After the large amount of rushing yardage given up in last year's contest, Miami managed to give up 95, 228 total against the Yellow Jackets' triple option. The Hurricanes' defense also contained the ailing preseason All-American and reigning ACC Player of the Year running back Jonathan Dwyer (who had a shoulder injury). Dwyer finished with 7 yards on five carries. With 270 yards and 3 touchdowns, Harris was named ACC Offensive Back of the Week for the second time of the season.

=== #12 Virginia Tech ===
	1	2	3	4	Total
#9 Miami	0	0	7	0	7
#12 Virginia Tech	14	7	3	7	31

At Lane Stadium, the Hurricanes were unable to get on track against the Virginia Tech defense, losing their first game of the year, 31–7. Jacory Harris struggled with both the wet conditions and the Hokie pass rush, going 9 for 25 for 150 yards with 1 interception and 1 fumble, while the Miami defense was unable to stop the Virginia Tech rushing attack, which achieved 272 yards on 55 attempts. A strip-sack of Harris on Miami's first possession of the game set-up Virginia Tech's first touchdown, and a 48-yard touchdown pass from Tyrod Taylor on the Hokies' next series put the Hurricanes at 14–0 at the end of the first quarter. On The Hurricanes' team Matt Bosher's punt was blocked and returned 1-yard for a Virginia Tech touchdown. The Hurricanes scored a quick touchdown on its opening drive and forcing a three-and-out on Virginia Tech's next possession. Down 21–7, Harris then drove the Hurricanes into Virginia Tech territory, but several critical drops by tight end Jimmy Graham defeated the drive and the Hurricanes would not threaten again for the rest of the game.

=== #8 Oklahoma ===
#8 Oklahoma at #17 Miami (FL)

Team	1	2	3	4	Total
Oklahoma	7	3	7	3	20
• Miami (FL)	0	7	14	0	21

- Date: October 3
- Location: Land Shark Stadium, Miami Gardens, Florida
- Game start: 8:00 p.m. EST
- Game attendance: 61,790
- TV announcers (ABC): Brent Musburger & Kirk Herbstreit

Scoring summary
1	10:34	OU	Cameron Kenney 16-yard pass from Landry Jones (Jimmy Stevens kick)	OU 7-0
2	11:39	OU	Jimmy Stevens 21-yard field goal	OU 10-0
2	8:20	MIA	Jimmy Graham 18-yard pass from Jacory Harris (Matt Bosher kick)	OU 10-7
3	14:21	MIA	Dedrick Epps 11-yard pass from Jacory Harris (Matt Bosher kick)	MIA 14-10
3	6:54	MIA	Travis Benjamin 38-yard pass from Jacory Harris (Matt Bosher kick)	MIA 21-10
3	3:43	OU	DeMarco Murray 2-yard run (Jimmy Stevens kick)	MIA 21-17
4	4:18	OU	Jimmy Stevens 39-yard field goal	MIA 21-20

Behind three touchdown passes from Jacory Harris, the Hurricanes overcame a sluggish start and were able to score against Oklahoma (without Sam Bradford) 21–20, knocking Oklahoma out of national championship contention, with the Hurricanes having previously been beaten at Oklahoma 51–13 in 2007. Playing without defending Heisman Trophy winner Bradford, who missed the game with a sprained shoulder, Oklahoma controlled the early part of the game, intercepting Harris on the Hurricanes' first two possessions and taking a 10–0 lead early in the second quarter. On the Hurricanes' next series, Harris shook threw an 18-yard touchdown pass to tight end Jimmy Graham to bring the Hurricanes within 3.

The game seemed to turn on the opening kickoff of the second half when a tackle by special teamer Corey Nelms backed up Oklahoma on its own 15-yard line. Two plays later, cornerback Brandon Harris sacked Oklahoma quarterback Landry Jones, causing him to fumble. The ball was recovered at the 11-yard line by Miami's Joe Joseph, and on the next play, Jacory Harris gave the Hurricanes their first lead of the night with an 11-yard touchdown pass to Dedrick Epps. After another Oklahoma punt, Harris put the Hurricanes up 21–10 with a 38-yard touchdown pass to a wide open Travis Benjamin.

Oklahoma responded with a 9-play, 81-yard touchdown drive on its next possession (kept alive by a dubious roughing the kicker penalty on a punt) and added a field goal with 4 minutes 18 seconds left in the fourth quarter to cut the score to 21–20. Oklahoma coach Bob Stoops then elected to kick deep rather than attempt an onside kick, and the Hurricanes, behind effective running by Javarris James (15 rushes, 150 yards) and a critical third-down conversion pass from Harris, was able to drive deep into Oklahoma territory and run out the clock for its first win over a top 10 opponent in five tries dating back to 2005.

Offensive tackle Jason Fox graded out at 99 percent, achieved 3 pancake blocks, and did not allow a sack in a performance for which he was given ACC Offensive Lineman of the Week honors.

=== Florida A&M ===
	1	2	3	4	Total
FAMU	3	0	10	3	16
#11 Miami	17	14	10	7	48

- 1st Quarter
  - Trevor Scott 32-yard Field Goal. (3-0 FAMU)
  - Leonard Hankerson 5-yard touchdown pass from Jacory Harris. Bosher PAT Good. (7-3 MIA)
  - Matt Bosher 20-yard Field Goal. (10-3 MIA)
  - Jimmy Graham 7-yard touchdown pass from Jacory Harris. Bosher PAT Good. (17-3 MIA)
- 2nd Quarter
  - Mike James 5-yard touchdown run. Bosher PAT Good. (24-3 MIA)
  - Lee Chambers 2-yard touchdown run. Bosher PAT Good. (31-3 MIA)
- 3rd Quarter
  - Trevor Scott 36-yard Field Goal. (31-6 MIA)
  - Thearon Collier 61-yard punt return. Bosher PAT Good. (38-6 MIA)
  - Curtis Pulley 26-yard touchdown run. Scott PAT Good. (38-13 MIA)
  - Matt Bosher 33-yard Field Goal. (41-13 MIA)
- 4th Quarter
  - Trevor Scott 21-yard Field Goal. (41-16 MIA)
  - Damien Barry 35-yard touchdown run. Bosher PAT Good. (48-16 MIA)

=== UCF ===
	1	2	3	4	Total
#11 Miami	7	3	10	7	27
Central Florida	0	0	7	0	7

- 1st Quarter
  - Leonard Hankerson 22-yard touchdown pass from Jacory Harris. Bosher PAT Good. (7-0 MIA)
- 2nd Quarter
  - Matt Bosher 31-yard Field Goal. (10-0 MIA)
- 3rd Quarter
  - Javarris James 5-yard touchdown run. Bosher PAT Good. (17-0 MIA)
  - Rocky Ross 8-yard touchdown pass from Brett Hodges. Cattoi PAT Good. (17-7 MIA)
  - Matt Bosher 46-yard Field Goal. (20-7 MIA)
- 4th Quarter
  - Damien Berry 3-yard touchdown run. Bosher PAT Good. (27-7 MIA)

=== Clemson ===
	1	2	3	4	OT	Total
Clemson	0	14	10	10	6	40
#8 Miami	0	10	14	10	3	37

- 1st Quarter
  - No Scoring
- 2nd Quarter
  - Matt Bosher 49-yard Field Goal. (3-0 MIA)
  - Michael Palmer 15-yard touchdown pass from Kyle Parker. Jackson PAT Good. (7-3 CLEM)
  - Damien Barry 23-yard touchdown run. Bosher PAT Good. (10-7 MIA)
  - C.J. Spiller 90-yard kickoff return. Jackson PAT Good. (14-10 CLEM)
- 3rd Quarter
  - Leonard Hankerson 5-yard touchdown pass from Jacory Harris. Bosher PAT Good. (17-14 MIA)
  - C.J. Spiller 56-yard touchdown pass from Kyle Parker. Jackson PAT Good. (21-17 CLEM)
  - Marcus Robinson 53-yard fumble return. Bosher PAT Good. (24-21 MIA)
  - Richard Jackson 43-yard Field Goal. (24-24 TIE)
- 4th Quarter
  - Matt Bosher 51-yard Field Goal. (27-24 MIA)
  - DeAndre McDaniel 23-yard interception return. Jackson PAT Good. (31-27 CLEM)
  - Travis Benjamin 69-yard touchdown pass from Jacory Harris. Bosher PAT Good. (34-31 MIA)
  - Richard Jackson 30-yard Field Goal. (34-34 TIE)
- Overtime
  - Matt Bosher 22-yard Field Goal. (37-34 MIA)
  - Jacoby Ford 26-yard touchdown pass from Kyle Parker. (No Extra Point). (40-37 CLEM)

=== Wake Forest ===
	1	2	3	4	Total
#18 Miami	0	14	0	14	28
Wake Forest	10	10	7	0	27

Dropped in the rankings by nine spots, Miami headed to Winston-Salem, North Carolina without two starters: LB Sean Spence (who had a knee injury and was replaced by sophomore Ramon Buchanan) and RB Javarris James who had been injured in the lower extremities. Bosher continued his kickoff duties due to Uribe's struggle the previous week. Despite being outgained 555 to 356 (the most the school had trailed by in nine years) and playing behind most of the game, the Hurricanes managed to win 28–27 in BB&T Field after a 13-yard Jacory Harris rainbow pass to Travis Benjamin gave them the lead with 1 minute 8 seconds remaining. It was their sixth straight win against the Demon Deacons and put them 7–3 overall.

Host Wake Forest having lost two straight to Clemson and Navy and scoring a touchdown only once in the last nine quarters. However, they scored the first 17 points, led by QB Riley Skinner who threw 18-for-22 and accounted for two touchdowns. Harris connected with Aldarius Johnson for a 35-yard touchdown. True freshman kicker Jimmy Newman achieved three for Wake Forest with 42 seconds remaining, but a 39-second Hurricane drive culminated in a touchdown after a three-yard run by RB Damien Berry, cutting the once 17-point margin to 6. However Skinner tossed a 44-yard touchdown to Chris Givens in the third quarter, raising it to 13 and Harris was intercepted on the subsequent drive. Early in the fourth, Deacons redshirt sophomore Devon Brown fumbled a punt after attempting to field it over his shoulder. The Hurricanes recovered at the two and scored on a catch by TE Tervaris Johnson with 11:47 left, cutting the lead to 27–21.

Midway through the quarter Riley Skinner left the game after suffering a "slight concession" after rushing on a quarterback keeper. Replaced by fifth-year senior Ryan McManus, Wake Forest failed to take enough time and punted with 2 minutes 40 seconds left to play. Starting on his own 18, Harris threw a 29-yard pass to Thearon Collier before being sacked for a loss of six. Facing 4th-and-16 the Hurricanes failed on their first two passes (a drop and an incompletion). Facing 4th and 16, Aldarius Johnson achieved a 29-yard pass. After throwing to Travis Benjamin for a 19-yard gain, Harris found him again for 13 yards and the lead with 1 minute 8 seconds remaining, achieving an 82-yard drive in 1 minute and 32 seconds. Downed at their own 21, Wake Forest moved the ball 62 yards to settle for a 60-yard field goal attempt, which went wide right.

After the game, the ACC named Jacory Harris, who was 22–43 with 330 yards, three touchdowns, and an interception, co-Offensive Back of the Week award, shared with Duke QB Thaddeus Lewis.

=== Virginia ===
	1	2	3	4	Total
Virginia	10	7	0	0	17
#17 Miami	17	7	14	14	52

The Hurricanes hosted the Cavaliers for the first time since the Cavaliers won 48–0 at the Orange Bowl in 2007. This time the Hurricanes won 52–17 at LandShark Stadium. RB Graig Cooper 152 outgained the Cavaliers (who totaled 149 yards after sitting out starting QB Jameel Sewell) himself with a career-best 152 yards on 18 careers and a touchdown. The Hurricanes defense pressured the Cavaliers into 75 yards passing and 74 rushing.

The Hurricanes were losing early 10–3 after Jacory Harris was intercepted early by Ras-I Dowling and Cavaliers RB Rashawn Jackson ran 34 yards for a score with 2:54 left in the first quarter. 25 seconds later, the Hurricanes tied the game with a 35-yard catch by Leonard Hankerson and went ahead just over a minute later after Thearon Collier returned a punt return for sixty yards. Both teams exchanged touchdowns in the second but running back Damien Berry achieved two short touchdowns after halftime. In the fourth quarter, Cooper achieved his only touchdown of the day in the fourth and true freshman quarterback A.J. Highsmith provided the final margin by throwing his first career touchdown pass; a 15-yarder to redshirt freshman Kendal Thompkins (his first touchdown reception of his career). Coming into the game, the Cavalier defense was ranked fourth in the country in passing touchdowns allowed with 4 after Air Force, Penn State and Nebraska.

=== North Carolina ===
#14 Miami at North Carolina

Team	1	2	3	4	Total
#14 Miami	0	7	10	7	24
• North Carolina	0	20	3	10	33

- Date: November 14
- Location: Kenan Memorial Stadium
  (Chapel Hill, North Carolina)
- Game start: 3:30 p.m.
- Elapsed time: 3:04
- Game attendance: 57,500

The Hurricanes traveled to Chapel Hill, North Carolina to face the North Carolina Tar Heels, who were 2–0 against the Hurricanes. They last competed at Miami on September 27, 2008, in a game won by North Carolina 28–24. The Hurricanes were 5–7 all time versus North Carolina.

Scoring summary

- 2nd quarter
  - UNC 14:12 – Greg Little 29-yard pass from T. J. Yates (7–0 UNC)
  - UM 11:44 – Damien Berry 1-yard run (7–7 tie)
  - UNC 8:21 – Casey Barth 22-yard field goal (10–7 UNC)
  - UNC 4:05 – Casey Barth 42-yard field goal (13–7 UNC)
  - UNC 0:56 – Kendric Burney 77-yard interception return (20–7 UNC)
- 3rd quarter
  - UNC 8:47 – Casey Barth 32-yard field goal (23–7 UNC)
  - UM 5:19 – Matt Bosher 39-yard field goal (23–10 UNC)
  - UM 1:18 – Greg Cooper 3-yard run (23–17 UNC)
- 4th quarter
  - UNC 9:28 – Melvin Williams 44-yard interception return (30–17 UNC)
  - UM 7:21 – Jimmy Graham 14-yard pass from Jacory Harris (30–24 UNC)
  - UNC 1:57 – Casey Barth 33-yard field goal (33–24 UNC)

=== Duke ===
	1	2	3	4	Total
Duke	3	10	3	0	16
#20 Miami	3	7	3	21	34

- 1st Quarter
  - Will Synderwine 30-yard Field Goal. (3-0 DUKE)
  - Matt Bosher 33-yard Field Goal. (3-3 Tie)
- 2nd Quarter
  - Will Synderwine 49-yard Field Goal. (6-3 DUKE)
  - Tervaris Johnson 20-yard touchdown pass from Jacory Harris. Bosher PAT Good. (10-6 MIA)
  - Donovan Varner 24-yard touchdown pass from Thaddeus Lewis. Synderwine PAT Good. (13-10 DUKE)
- 3rd Quarter
  - Will Synderwine 26-yard Field Goal. (16-10 DUKE)
  - Matt Bosher 20-yard Field Goal. (16-13 DUKE)
- 4th Quarter
  - Damien Barry 2-yard touchdown run. Bosher PAT Good. (20-16 MIA)
  - Leonard Hankerson 44-yard touchdown pass from Jacory Harris. (27-16 MIA)
  - Darryl Sharpton 73 interception return. Bosher PAT Good. (34-16 MIA)

=== South Florida ===
	1	2	3	4	Total
#17 Miami	14	7	7	3	31
South Florida	0	3	7	0	10

- 1st Quarter
  - Leonard Hankerson 11-yard touchdown pass from Jacory Harris. Bosher PAT Good. (7-0 MIA)
  - Javarris James 5-yard touchdown run. Bosher PAT Good. (14-0 MIA)
- 2nd Quarter
  - Eric Schwartz 36-yard Field Goal. (14-3 MIA)
  - Javarris James 2-yard touchdown run. Bosher PAT Good. (21-3 MIA)
- 3rd Quarter
  - A.J. Love 12-yard touchdown pass from B.J. Daniels. Schwartz PAT Good. (21-10 MIA)
  - Dedrick Epps 33-yard pass from Jacory Harris. Bosher PAT Good. (28-10 MIA)
- 4th Quarter
  - Matt Bosher 32-yard Field Goal. (31-10 MIA)

== Champs Sports Bowl ==
=== #25 Wisconsin ===
	1	2	3	4	Total
#15 Miami	7	0	0	7	14
#25 Wisconsin	7	10	0	3	20

The Champs Sports Bowl took place on December 29, 2009, at 8:00 p.m. in the Florida Citrus Bowl Stadium in Orlando, Florida against the Big Ten Conference representative Wisconsin Badgers. Senior corner back for the Hurricanes Sam Shields returned the opening kick off for a touchdown off a reverse from Graig Cooper. A block in the back penalty against the Canes negated the touchdown, however Cooper scored on the next play on a 15-yard run that gave Miami an early 7–0 lead. Led by the Big Ten Player of the Year halfback John Clay, Wisconsin handled the Hurricanes up front on both ends of the ball. After the first touchdown by Clay halfway through the first quarter, the two teams swapped field position up until Clay scored his second touchdown of the night giving Wisconsin a 14–7 advantage. After holding the Hurricanes on their next two possessions, Wisconsin scored a late field goal to bring the lead to 17–7 just before the half was out. Following the field goal, Miami's Graig Cooper sustained a major knee injury on the kickoff return that ruled him out of the game for the Hurricanes. Though there was no scoring for Wisconsin in the second half, they outmuscled the Hurricanes up front and controlled the ball for the majority of the second half. The Hurricanes had a slight chance of victory after Jacory Harris found Thearon Collier with a touchdown pass with just over one minute in the game. After recovering the onside kick, Miami could not move the ball and the game ended with a Wisconsin victory, 20–14. Player of the Game honors went to John Clay, who had 120 yards rushing and two scores.

== Rankings ==
Ranking movements Legend: ██ Increase in ranking ██ Decrease in ranking RV = Received votes
	Week															
Poll	Pre	1	2	3	4	5	6	7	8	9	10	11	12	13	14	Final
AP	RV	20	20	9	17	11	9	8	18	16	12	21	19	17	14	19
Coaches	RV	22	22	13	21	11	11	9	18	17	15	24	21	17	15	19
Harris	Not released				22	12	12	10	18	17	15	24	21	17	15	Not released
BCS	Not released							10	19	17	14	20	17	17	15	Not released

== Coaching staff ==
Position	Name	Yrs. in current pos.
Head coach	Randy Shannon	3rd
Offensive coordinator/assistant head coach	Mark Whipple	1st
Defensive coordinator/linebackers coach	John Lovett	1st
Special Teams / TEs	Joe Pannunzio	4th
Quarterbacks	Mark Whipple	1st
Running backs	Tommie Robinson	3rd
Wide Receivers	Aubrey Hill	2nd
Offensive Line	Jeff Stoutland	3rd
Defensive Line	Clint Hurtt	4th
Linebackers/defensive assistant	Micheal Barrow	3rd
Defensive Backs	Wesley McGriff	3rd
Strength and conditioning	Andreu Swasey	8th
