= 2009 Wisconsin Badgers football team =

American college football season

2009 Wisconsin Badgers football

Champs Sports Bowl champion

Champs Sports Bowl, W 20–14 vs Miami (FL)
- Conference: Big Ten Conference

Ranking
- Coaches: No. 16
- AP: No. 16
- Record: 10–3 (5–3 Big Ten)
- Head coach: Bret Bielema (4th season)
- Offensive coordinator: Paul Chryst (5th season)
- Offensive scheme: Pro-style
- Defensive coordinator: Dave Doeren (2nd season)
- Base defense: 4–3
- MVPs: Garrett Graham; O'Brien Schofield
- Captains: Garrett Graham; Chris Maragos; O'Brien Schofield; Mickey Turner
- Home stadium: Camp Randall Stadium

2009 Big Ten Conference football standings
	Conf.			Overall
Team	W		L	W		L
No. 5 Ohio State $	7	–	1	11	–	2
No. 7 Iowa %	6	–	2	11	–	2
No. 9 Penn State	6	–	2	11	–	2
Northwestern	5	–	3	8	–	5
No. 16 Wisconsin	5	–	3	10	–	3
Michigan State	4	–	4	6	–	7
Purdue	4	–	4	5	–	7
Minnesota	3	–	5	6	–	7
Illinois	2	–	6	3	–	9
Michigan	1	–	7	5	–	7
Indiana	1	–	7	4	–	8
$ – BCS representative as conference champion; % – BCS at-large representative; Rankings from AP Poll

The 2009 Wisconsin Badgers football team was an American football team that represented the University of Wisconsin–Madison as a member of the Big Ten Conference during the 2009 NCAA Division I FBS football season. In their fourth year under head coach Bret Bielema, the Badgers compiled a 10–3 record (5–3 in conference games), tied for fourth place in the Big Ten, and outscored opponents by a total of 413 to 283. Against ranked opponents, the Badgers lost to No. 9 Ohio State and No. 11 Iowa. They concluded the season with a 20–14 victory over No. 14 Miami (FL) in the Champs Sports Bowl. They were ranked No. 16 in the final AP and Coaches polls.

The team's statistical leaders included John Clay (1,517 rushing yards, 108 points scored), quarterback Scott Tolzien (2,705 passing yards, 142.99 passer rating), wide receiver Nick Toon (54 receptions for 805 yards), and Jaeve McFadden (43 solo tackles, 74 total tackles).

The team played its home games at Camp Randall Stadium in Madison, Wisconsin.

== Schedule ==
Date	Time	Opponent	Rank	Site	TV	Result	Attendance	Source
September 5	6:00 p.m.	Northern Illinois*		Camp Randall Stadium; Madison, WI	BTN	W 28–20	80,532	
September 12	11:00 a.m.	Fresno State*		Camp Randall Stadium; Madison, WI	ESPN	W 34–31 ^{2OT}	80,353	
September 19	11:00 a.m.	Wofford*		Camp Randall Stadium; Madison, WI	BTN	W 44–14	78,253	
September 26	11:00 a.m.	Michigan State		Camp Randall Stadium; Madison, WI	ESPN	W 38–30	80,123	
October 3	11:00 a.m.	at Minnesota		TCF Bank Stadium; Minneapolis, MN (rivalry)	ESPN	W 31–28	50,805	
October 10	2:30 p.m.	at No. 9 Ohio State		Ohio Stadium; Columbus, OH	ABC/ESPN	L 13–31	105,301	
October 17	11:00 a.m.	No. 11 Iowa^{†}		Camp Randall Stadium; Madison, WI (rivalry)	ESPN	L 10–20	81,043	
October 31	11:00 a.m.	Purdue		Camp Randall Stadium; Madison, WI	ESPN2	W 37–0	79,920	
November 7	11:00 a.m.	at Indiana	No. 24	Memorial Stadium; Bloomington, IN	BTN	W 31–28	36,611	
November 14	11:00 a.m.	Michigan	No. 21	Camp Randall Stadium; Madison, WI	BTN	W 45–24	80,540	
November 21	2:30 p.m.	at Northwestern	No. 17	Ryan Field; Evanston, IL	BTN	L 31–33	32,150	
December 5	10:30 p.m.	at Hawaii*		Aloha Stadium; Halawa, HI	ESPN2	W 51–10	40,069	
December 29	7:00 p.m.	vs. No. 14 Miami (FL)*	No. 24	Florida Citrus Bowl; Orlando, FL (Champs Sports Bowl)	ESPN	W 20–14	56,747	
*Non-conference game; ^{†}Homecoming; Rankings from AP Poll released prior to the game; All times are in Central time

== Rankings ==
Ranking movements Legend: ██ Increase in ranking ██ Decrease in ranking — = Not ranked RV = Received votes
	Week															
Poll	Pre	1	2	3	4	5	6	7	8	9	10	11	12	13	14	Final
AP	—	—	—	—	RV	RV	RV	RV	RV	24	21	17	RV	RV	24	16
Coaches	RV	—	—	RV	RV	25	RV	RV	RV	22	20	14	RV	RV	22	16
Harris	Not released						RV	25	RV	24	20	15	RV	RV	23	Not released
BCS	Not released							21	—	21	20	16	—	—	25	Not released

== Game summaries ==
=== Northern Illinois ===
Northern Illinois at Wisconsin

Team	1	2	3	4	Total
Northern Illinois	3	3	0	14	20
• Wisconsin	7	7	14	0	28

- Date: September 5
- Location: Camp Randall Stadium
  Madison, WI
- Game start: 6:00 p.m. CDT
- Elapsed time: 3:00
- Game attendance: 80,532
- Game weather: Partly Cloudy, 77 °F (25 °C), Wind S 7 mph (11 km/h)
- TV announcers (BTN): Wayne Larrivee (play-by-play), Chris Martin (color), & Charissa Thompson (sideline)

Wisconsin opened the 2009 season at home against Northern Illinois. Both teams had gone through disappointing seasons the year before, Wisconsin finishing 7–6 overall and 3–5 in the Big Ten with a blowout loss in the 2008 Champs Sports Bowl, and Northern Illinois finishing 6–7 overall with a loss in the 2008 Independence Bowl.

On Wisconsin's first play from scrimmage, QB Scott Tolzien, a surprise winner of the quarterback competition in spring practice, threw an 80-yard touchdown strike to WR Isaac Anderson. 11 seconds into the game, the Badgers led 7–0. Northern Illinois responded with a 40-yard field goal by Mike Salerno late in the 1st quarter. In the 2nd quarter, after the Wisconsin offense brought the Badgers within striking range, Isaac Anderson ran 23 yards for a touchdown to extend Wisconsin's lead to 14–3. NIU kept themselves in the game with another Salerno field goal, and the Badgers led 14–6 at the end of the first half.

In the 3rd quarter, Wisconsin running back John Clay scored a pair of 1-yard touchdowns to give the Badgers a commanding 28–6 lead going into the 4th quarter. However, Northern Illinois would not go away, as RB Chad Spann tacked on a 1-yard touchdown to cut Wisconsin's lead to 28–12. However, the ensuing 2-point conversion failed and the Huskies trailed 28–12. Spann would add a 2-yard touchdown run to cut NIU's deficit to 28–18, and QB Chandler Harnish converted the 2 point try to make the score 28–20. Northern Illinois recovered the onside kick, but their final drive stalled on the Wisconsin 36 and the Huskies turned the ball over on downs, allowing Wisconsin to come up with the victory.

=== Fresno State ===
Fresno State at Wisconsin

Team	1	2	3	4	OT	Total
Fresno State	7	14	0	3	7	31
• Wisconsin	0	17	0	7	10	34

- Date: September 12
- Location: Camp Randall Stadium
  Madison, WI
- Game start: 11:00 a.m. CDT
- Elapsed time: 3:30
- Game attendance: 80,353
- Game weather: Clear, 70 °F (21 °C), Wind N 0 mph (0 km/h)
- TV announcers (ESPN): Dave Pasch (play-by-play), Bob Griese (color), & Chris Spielman (sideline)

Fresno State entered the game having won their last trip to Madison, back in the 2001 season. They appeared to be well on their way to another win after Fresno QB Ryan Colburn connected with Chestin West for a 13-yard touchdown pass to give Fresno a 7–0 lead over Wisconsin in the 1st quarter. On Fresno's next drive, Colburn found WR Devon Wylie on a 70-yard touchdown strike to put the Bulldogs up 14–0 in the 2nd quarter. However, Wisconsin fought back; running back Zach Brown ran 11 yards for a touchdown to cap off a long Wisconsin drive, cutting Wisconsin's deficit to 14–7. Fresno attempted to pull away again; Colburn found WR Seyi Ajirotutu on a 14-yard TD strike to extend Fresno State's lead to 21–7. Wisconsin responded swiftly, with an 8-yard touchdown run off an end-around by WR David Gilreath to bring the game within a single score at 21–14. Wisconsin K Philip Welch connected on the longest field goal in school history, a 57-yard try that cut Fresno State's lead to 21–17 at the end of the half.

A scoreless 3rd quarter saw the Badgers needing a big play in the 4th quarter. Wisconsin defensive backs intercepted Colburn twice in the 3rd, but the Badgers didn't get any points off those turnovers. After a Fresno State punt, Wisconsin got the big play they needed; RB John Clay broke several tackles and ran 72 yards for a touchdown to give Wisconsin a 24–21 lead. Fresno, stunned but not yet beaten, rallied and drove late in the 4th quarter for the tying field goal by Kevin Goessling. Wisconsin ran out the remaining clock and the game went to overtime.

Fresno State elected to play defense first in overtime, but Wisconsin scored on their first possession, as QB Scott Tolzien connected with WR Nick Toon for a 6-yard touchdown pass to give Wisconsin a 30–24 lead. Philip Welch converted the PAT to give Wisconsin a 31–24 lead. Fresno State too scored a touchdown on their first overtime possession, Colburn finding Ajirotutu for a 7-yard touchdown strike and his fourth touchdown pass of the game. Goessling made the PAT, and the game headed into a second overtime. Colburn would not be so fortunate though, as he was intercepted in the end zone by S Chris Maragos. Philip Welch kicked a 22-yard field goal to win the game for the Badgers.

With the win, Wisconsin improved to 2–0 on the season.

=== Wofford ===
Wofford at Wisconsin

Team	1	2	3	4	Total
Wofford	0	0	7	7	14
• Wisconsin	3	28	6	7	44

- Date: September 19
- Location: Camp Randall Stadium
  Madison, WI
- Game start: 11:00 a.m. CDT
- Elapsed time: 2:49
- Game attendance: 78,253
- Game weather: Partly Cloudy, 64 °F (18 °C), Wind E 7 mph (11 km/h)
- TV announcers (BTN): Matt Devlin (play-by-play), Glen Mason (color), & Jay Wilson (sideline)

Wisconsin played extremely well in all phases of the game, as they defeated FCS foe Wofford 44–14. The Badgers improved to 3–0 on the season.

=== Michigan State ===
Michigan State at Wisconsin

Team	1	2	3	4	Total
Michigan State	0	7	10	13	30
• Wisconsin	7	14	3	14	38

- Date: September 26
- Location: Camp Randall Stadium
  Madison, WI
- Game start: 11:00 a.m. CDT
- Elapsed time: 3:28
- Game attendance: 78,253
- Game weather: Haze, 63 °F (17 °C), Wind NNE 7 mph (11 km/h)
- TV announcers (ESPN): Dave Pasch (play-by-play), Bob Griese (color), & Chris Spielman (color)

Both Wisconsin and MSU looked to win their first Big Ten Conference game of the year. Michigan State entered the game on a 2-game losing streak, having lost to Notre Dame and Central Michigan in consecutive weeks. Wisconsin entered the game at 3–0.

After Wisconsin LB Mike Taylor intercepted Michigan State QB Kirk Cousins in the 1st quarter, Wisconsin QB Scott Tolzien connected with TE Garrett Graham for a 15-yard touchdown pass to give Wisconsin a 7–0 lead. In the 2nd quarter, Michigan State responded, as Cousins found WR Mark Dell on a 14-yard touchdown pass to tie the game 7-7. Wisconsin struck back with a long touchdown drive of their own, Tolzien finding Graham on a 6-yard touchdown pass to take the lead back, 14–7. After another Michigan State interception, Tolzien drove the Badgers down the field, and RB John Clay ran for a 1-yard touchdown to give Wisconsin a 21–7 lead. Both teams traded punts, and the score remained 21–7 at the end of the first half.

In the 3rd quarter, Wisconsin RB Zach Brown lost a fumble and Michigan State recovered. MSU drove deep into Wisconsin territory, but the Badger defense stopped MSU in the red zone and the Spartans were forced to try a field goal. MSU K Brett Swenson converted the 28 yard attempt, and cut Wisconsin's lead to 21–10. Wisconsin drove the field on the next drive, but MSU's defense held the Badgers out of the redzone and forced a field goal. Philip Welch converted to give the Badgers a 24–10 lead. Michigan State would not go away so easily, and drove the field for a touchdown, this time from Cousins to B.J. Cunningham. Swenson converted the PAT and Wisconsin led 24–17 at the end of the 3rd quarter. In the 4th quarter, Tolzien found Nick Toon for a 19-yard touchdown pass to extend Wisconsin's lead to 31–17. After a penalty backed the Spartans up, MSU RB Glenn Winston fumbled the ball and Wisconsin DE J. J. Watt recovered, setting up the Badgers with excellent field position. On 3rd and 1 from the Michigan State 23, Tolzien found Garrett Graham on a 23-yard touchdown pass, his 4th touchdown pass of the game to give Wisconsin a 38–17 lead with 12:14 remaining in the 4th Quarter.

Michigan State, now desperate, drove into Wisconsin territory again, but Kirk Cousins was sacked on a 4th and 10 from the Wisconsin 32 by LB Chris Borland and the Spartans turned the ball over on downs. Wisconsin drove right back into Michigan State territory, but John Clay was stopped short of the first down on a 4th and inches from the MSU 20 by LB Greg Jones. Michigan State again drove into Wisconsin territory, but Keith Nichol threw an ill-advised pass into coverage and was intercepted by Wisconsin S Chris Maragos. Wisconsin was forced to punt, however, and Michigan State made the most of it, as Nichol found WR Keshawn Martin for a 15-yard touchdown. MSU head coach Mark Dantonio elected to try for two, but Nichol's pass fell incomplete. Wisconsin punted on their next drive, and Dantonio earned the ire of the Camp Randall crowd after Nichol threw a 91-yard touchdown pass to Martin with the game hopelessly out of reach.

Despite the garbage-time score from Michigan State, Wisconsin rather handily won this game and improved to 4–0 on the season. Michigan State's 3rd straight defeat dropped them to 1–3, matching their regular season loss total from the previous season.

=== Minnesota ===
Wisconsin at Minnesota

Team	1	2	3	4	Total
• Wisconsin	7	3	7	14	31
Minnesota	10	3	0	15	28

- Date: October 3
- Location: TCF Bank Stadium
  Minneapolis, MN
- Game start: 11:00 a.m. CDT
- Elapsed time: 3:14
- Game attendance: 50,805
- Game weather: Drizzle, 45 °F (7 °C), Wind NNW 11 mph (18 km/h)
- TV announcers (ESPN): Dave Pasch (play-by-play), Bob Griese (color), & Chris Spielman (color)

Wisconsin looked to improve to 5–0 on the season, and win a 6th consecutive game over the rival Golden Gophers. Minnesota entered the game at 3–1, having defeated Northwestern the week before but having been blown out in a home loss to California the week before.

In the first quarter, Wisconsin led 7–0 after a 2-yard touchdown run by John Clay. Minnesota fired back with a pair of 1st quarter scoring drives; a 28-yard FG by kicker Eric Ellestad and an 11-yard touchdown pass from QB Adam Weber to WR Eric Decker. Minnesota led 10–7 at the end of the first quarter. Wisconsin answered with a 39-yard FG by Philip Welch to tie the game at 10-10, but Minnesota would lead the game at the end of the first half 13–10 after another FG by Ellestad.

In the 3rd quarter, John Clay found the end zone from a yard out to give Wisconsin a 17–13 lead, and the only score of the touchdown by either team. In the 4th quarter, Scott Tolzien found TE Lance Kendricks for a 5-yard touchdown pass to give Wisconsin a 24–13 lead. Wisconsin looked to ice the game on their next offensive possession, but RB Zach Brown fumbled the ball and Minnesota S Marcus Sherels returned the fumble 88 yards for a touchdown to keep Minnesota in the game at 24–19. Minnesota tried for 2 and succeeded as Weber found WR Dajon McKnight in the endzone, cutting Wisconsin's lead to 24–21.

Wisconsin refused to let the Gophers back into the game, and after a long drive, John Clay ran into the end zone for his 3rd touchdown of the day and Wisconsin led 31–21. Minnesota responded swiftly, coming within 3 points of Wisconsin after RB Duane Bennett scored on a 1-yard touchdown carry to make the score 31–28. The onside kick attempt failed, however, and Minnesota had to use its remaining timeouts to stall Wisconsin on the Minnesota 39. Brad Nortman's punt was partially blocked and downed at the Minnesota 5-yard line, giving the Gophers one final chance at snapping Wisconsin's win streak.

After a short drive by the Gophers, Weber was sacked on 1st and 10 from the Minnesota 34 by O'Brien Schofield. Weber fumbled the ball as he was sacked, and Wisconsin LB Chris Borland recovered. Wisconsin ran out the remaining 30 seconds and secured Paul Bunyan's Axe for the 6th year in a row, and their first win (in their first appearance) at TCF Bank Stadium. Wisconsin head coach Bret Bielema is now 4–0 against the rival Gophers. The Badgers travel to Ohio State to take on the Buckeyes in Ohio Stadium next week.

=== Ohio State ===
Wisconsin at #9 Ohio State

Team	1	2	3	4	Total
Wisconsin	0	10	3	0	13
• #9 Ohio State	7	7	14	3	31

- Date: October 10
- Location: Ohio Stadium
  Columbus, OH
- Game start: 2:30 p.m. CDT
- Elapsed time: 3:10
- Game attendance: 105,301
- Game weather: Cloudy, 57 °F (14 °C), Wind W 5 mph (8.0 km/h)
- TV announcers (ABC/ESPN): Sean McDonough (play-by-play), Matt Millen (color), & Holly Rowe (sideline)

Wisconsin entered the game with a 5–0 record. Ohio State entered 4–1 with a 2–0 record in Big Ten play; their only loss a heartrending defeat at the hands of USC. Wisconsin's defense completely shut down Ohio State QB Terrelle Pryor, holding him to a dismal 5 of 13 passing for 89 yards with a touchdown and an interception. Pryor was harried all game long and sacked repeatedly by the surprisingly effective Wisconsin defense. However, Wisconsin's offense was unable to capitalize on several trips into Ohio State territory, some of which got Wisconsin into the Ohio State red zone. Badger QB Scott Tolzien threw an interception to Kurt Coleman that Coleman would return for a touchdown, and on a later series, a tipped pass was intercepted by Ohio State's Jermale Hines and returned for another touchdown. Ohio State's final boost came from special teams, as KR Ray Small had a 96-yard kick return for a touchdown after a Wisconsin FG by Philip Welch.

Wisconsin dominated Ohio State offensively (with over 368 yards of total offense) and defensively (holding Ohio State to 184 yards of total offense), but failed repeatedly to capitalize on the opportunities Ohio State offered; as Philip Welch missed a pair of field goals and Scott Tolzien failed to complete a pair of passes on 4th and long situations in the 4th quarter of the game. Wisconsin's missed opportunities, combined with the opportunistic Buckeye defense, saw the Badgers drop their first game of the year, 31–13. The loss dropped Bret Bielema to 0–3 against Ohio State.

=== Iowa ===
#11 Iowa at Wisconsin

Team	1	2	3	4	Total
• #11 Iowa	0	3	7	10	20
Wisconsin	7	3	0	0	10

- Date: October 17
- Location: Camp Randall Stadium
  Madison, WI
- Game start: 11:00 a.m. CDT
- Elapsed time: 3:28
- Game attendance: 81,043
- Game weather: Partly Cloudy, 40 °F (4 °C), Wind NW 6 mph (9.7 km/h)
- TV announcers (ESPN): Dave Pasch (play-by-play), Bob Griese (color), & Chris Spielman (color)

Iowa turned a 10–0 Wisconsin lead into a 20–10 Hawkeye advantage in the 4th quarter. While Wisconsin RB Montee Ball recorded his first career rushing touchdown at Wisconsin in the first quarter, Wisconsin wouldn't score another touchdown for the entirety of the game. RB John Clay was held in check by the Iowa defense, which stymied Wisconsin from the 1st quarter on. Iowa intercepted Wisconsin QB Scott Tolzien 3 times in the game to help turn their deficit into an eventual lead and win in Camp Randall.

The loss extended Iowa's winning streak over Wisconsin to two games (from the 2008 contest) and kept Iowa undefeated at 7–0. Wisconsin fell to 5–2 overall and 2–2 in the Big Ten, having lost both games to ranked conference opponents.

=== Purdue ===
Purdue at Wisconsin

Team	1	2	3	4	Total
Purdue	0	0	0	0	0
• Wisconsin	7	17	10	3	37

- Date: October 31
- Location: Camp Randall Stadium
  Madison, WI
- Game start: 11:00 a.m. CDT
- Elapsed time: 3:00
- Game attendance: 79,920
- Game weather: Partly Cloudy, 39 °F (4 °C), Wind W 9 mph (14 km/h)
- TV announcers (ESPN2): Pam Ward (play-by-play) & Ray Bentley (color)

Purdue entered the game at 3–5 overall, with a 2–2 record in Big Ten play. Having upset Ohio State and defeated Illinois in back to back weeks, Purdue looked for their first win over Wisconsin since the 2003 season. Wisconsin entered after a bye week, having lost two games in a row.

However, Wisconsin had perhaps its finest game of the season as the Badgers used a pair of touchdown runs by John Clay, a FG by Philip Welch, and a blocked punt returned for a touchdown by Aaron Henry to race off to a 24–0 lead at the half. Purdue QB Joey Elliott, who had played extremely well against Ohio State, was shaky in the pocket and completed just 5 of his 23 pass attempts to Purdue receivers; he also threw an interception and was sacked twice. In the 2nd half, the Badgers protected their big lead with a pair of Philip Welch field goals and another touchdown run by John Clay.

With the 37–0 win, Wisconsin moved above .500 in Big Ten conference play at 3–2. The Badgers's 6th win of the year clinched a bowl bid for the 9th consecutive season.

=== Indiana ===
#22 Wisconsin at Indiana

Team	1	2	3	4	Total
• #22 Wisconsin	7	17	0	7	31
Indiana	7	7	0	14	28

- Date: November 7
- Location: Memorial Stadium
  Bloomington, IN
- Game start: 11:00 a.m. CDT
- Elapsed time: 2:57
- Game attendance: 36,611
- Game weather: Sunny, 64 °F (18 °C), Wind SW 17 mph (27 km/h)
- TV announcers (BTN): Craig Coshun (play-by-play), Glen Mason (color), & Mike Hall (sideline)

After a 37–0 defeat of the Purdue Boilermakers, Wisconsin was ranked for the first time since their loss to Ohio State.

Poor secondary play by Wisconsin kept the Hoosiers in the game, missed opportunities for the Badgers once again hurt their offensive production, as the Badgers recorded just a touchdown off of two interceptions thrown by Indiana QB Ben Chappell. Indiana scored the first points of the game on a touchdown pass by Chappell to WR Tandon Doss. The Badgers answered with a touchdown drive of their own, as QB Scott Tolzien found receiver Isaac Anderson for an 18-yard touchdown pass. The next scoring drive of the game came in the 2nd quarter on a 26-yard FG by Philip Welch. A 1-yard TD run by RB Montee Ball gave the Badgers a run of 17 unanswered points, which Indiana snapped with a 46-yard touchdown pass from Chappell to Doss. Wisconsin countered with a 14-yard touchdown run by John Clay, and the Badgers led 24–14 at the end of the 1st half.

A scoreless 3rd quarter followed, but in the 4th quarter, Indiana brought the game within 3 points on a 6-yard pass from Ben Chappell to WR Terrance Turner, making the score 24–21 in favor of Wisconsin. The Badgers once again answered with a touchdown drive, and Montee Ball found the endzone from 3 yards out to give Wisconsin a 31–21 lead. Not quite finished, Indiana scored another touchdown with just about 4 minutes remaining in the game. After a touchback on the ensuing kickoff, Wisconsin ran out the remaining 4:01 despite Indiana using all 3 of their timeouts. With the 31–28 win, Wisconsin moved to 7–2 on the year.

=== Michigan ===
Michigan at #20 Wisconsin

Team	1	2	3	4	Total
Michigan	7	10	7	0	24
• #20 Wisconsin	7	14	14	10	45

- Date: November 14
- Location: Camp Randall Stadium
  Madison, WI
- Game start: 11:00 a.m. CST
- Elapsed time: 3:03
- Game attendance: 80,450
- Game weather: Partly Cloudy, 51 °F (11 °C), Wind S 8 mph (13 km/h)
- TV announcers (BTN): Wayne Larrivee (play-by-play), Chris Martin (color), & Charissa Thompson (sideline)

Michigan entered the game having lost 5 consecutive Big Ten games after a narrow 38–31 win over Indiana in their conference opener. The Wolverines thus needed a win over Wisconsin or Ohio State to make the required 6 wins for postseason play. Wisconsin, at 7–2, was hardly going to let Michigan walk into the postseason, especially in light of the previous year's disastrous second half collapse in Ann Arbor and looked to continue Michigan's struggles against Big Ten opposition.

In the first quarter, Scott Tolzien found TE Garrett Graham for a 22-yard touchdown pass to give Wisconsin a 7–0 lead. Michigan countered with a 21-yard touchdown pass from QB Tate Forcier to RB Vincent Smith. After a field goal attempt by Jason Olesnavage was blocked by J. J. Watt, the score was tied 7–7 at the end of the first quarter. Michigan intercepted Tolzien on the next series, however, and converted on their next FG attempt, making the score 10–7 in Michigan's favor in the 2nd quarter. Wisconsin drove down the field on the next drive and scored on a touchdown pass from Tolzien to WR Nick Toon, and Wisconsin took the lead 14–10. On Wisconsin's next offensive series, however, Tolzien was sacked by DE Brandon Graham, and fumbled. Michigan DE Ryan Van Bergen returned the fumble 14 yards for a touchdown to give Michigan a 17–14 lead. But the Badgers refused to go away, using a 9-play, 75-yard drive capped off by a 1-yard touchdown run by John Clay to take the lead right back to Wisconsin, 21–17. Wisconsin stopped Michigan QB Denard Robinson on a 4th and 6 from the Michigan 46 with 1 second remaining and led 21–17 at the end of the 1st half.

In the 2nd half, Wisconsin marched down the field and scored on their first possession. Scott Tolzien completed a touchdown pass to Nick Toon, who made a highlight reel catch in the endzone despite defensive pass interference. Philip Welch converted the PAT and Wisconsin led 28–17. Forcier led the Wolverines right back down the field and completed a 10-yard touchdown pass to WR Roy Roundtree, making the score 28–24. However, that would be the last points Michigan would score in the game. Wisconsin answered Michigan's long drive with one of their own, and Tolzien capped off the drive by finding TE Lance Kendricks on a 7-yard touchdown pass to give Wisconsin a 35–24 lead.

In the 4th quarter, Forcier was intercepted by Wisconsin CB Niles Brinkley and Wisconsin capitalized on a 10-play, 60-yard drive topped off by a 1-yard touchdown run by Scott Tolzien, making the score 42–24. Wisconsin forced a Zoltan Mesko punt on the next series, and used a 15-play, 60-yard drive that lasted 8:08. Philip Welch converted a 28-yard attempt, and Wisconsin led 45–24. On Michigan's final drive of the game, Denard Robinson drove the Wolverines into Wisconsin territory, but again failed to convert a 4th down and the Wolverines turned the ball over with 1 second remaining in the game. Wisconsin ran it out, and won their 8th game of the year.

Wisconsin's 21-point win over Michigan was the biggest in series history by the Badgers, who have won 3 consecutive home games against the Wolverines for the first time in school history.

=== Northwestern ===
Wisconsin at Northwestern

Team	1	2	3	4	Total
#14 Wisconsin	0	14	10	7	31
• Northwestern	10	17	3	3	33

- Date: November 21
- Location: Ryan Field
  Evanston, IL
- Game start: 2:30 p.m. CST
- Elapsed time: 3:10
- Game attendance: 32,805
- Game weather: Sunny, 52 °F (11 °C), Wind ESE 6 mph (9.7 km/h)
- TV announcers (BTN): Wayne Larrivee (play-by-play), Chris Martin (color), & Charissa Thompson (sideline)

=== Hawaii ===
Wisconsin at Hawaii

Team	1	2	3	4	Total
• Wisconsin	14	13	7	17	51
Hawaii	0	3	0	7	10

- Date: December 5
- Location: Aloha Stadium
  Honolulu, HI
- Game start: 10:30 p.m. CST
- Elapsed time: 3:14
- Game attendance: 95,854,456
- Game weather: Clear, 77 °F (25 °C), Wind SW 6 mph (9.7 km/h)
- TV announcers (ESPN2): Terry Gannon (play-by-play) & David Norrie (color)

=== 2009 Champs Sports Bowl vs. Miami (FL) ===
#22 Wisconsin vs. #15 Miami (FL)

Team	1	2	3	4	Total
• #22 Wisconsin	7	10	0	3	20
#15 Miami (FL)	7	0	0	7	14

- Date: December 29
- Location: Florida Citrus Bowl
  Orlando, FL
- Game start: 7:00 p.m. CST
- Elapsed time: 3:12
- Game attendance: 56,747
- Game weather: Clear, 50 °F (10 °C), Wind NNE 8 mph (13 km/h)
- TV announcers (ESPN/Westwood One): Brad Nessler (play-by-play), Todd Blackledge (color), & Holly Rowe (sideline) / Chuck Cooperstein (play-by-play) & Eddie George (color)

== Personnel ==
=== Roster ===
2009 Wisconsin Badgers football team roster
Players
Coaches
Offense

Pos.	#	Name	Class
RB	28	Montee Ball	Fr
OT	68	Gabe Carimi	Jr
RB	32	John Clay	So
WR	85	David Gilreath	Jr
TE	88	Garrett Graham (C)	So
TE	84	Lance Kendricks	Jr
G	74	John Moffitt	Jr
QB	16	Scott Tolzien	Jr
TE	36	Mickey Turner (C)	Sr
OT	70	Kevin Zeitler	So

Defense

Pos.	#	Name	Class
S	21	Chris Maragos (C)	Sr
DE	50	O'Brien Schofield (C)	Sr
CB	7	Aaron Henry	So
CB	26	Antonio Fenelus	So
S	12	Jay Valai	Jr
DE	99	J. J. Watt	So

Special teams

Pos.	#	Name	Class
K	18	Philip Welch	So
P	98	Brad Nortman	So

Head coach

- Bret Bielema

Coordinators/assistant coaches

- Paul Chryst – Offensive coordinator/quarterbacks
- Dave Doeren – Defensive coordinator/inside linebackers
- Del Alexander – Wide receivers
- Bob Bostad – Offensive line/run game coordinator
- Kerry Cooks – Defensive backs
- Randall McCray – Safeties
- Charlie Partridge – Defensive line/special teams
- Joe Rudolph – Tight ends/recruiting coordinator
- John Settle – Running backs
- Terrance Jamison – Student assistant

Legend

- (C) Team captain
- (S) Suspended
- (I) Ineligible
- Injured
- Redshirt

=== Regular starters ===
Position	Player
Quarterback	Scott Tolzien
Running back	John Clay
Wide receiver	Nick Toon
Wide receiver	Isaac Anderson
Tight end	Garrett Graham
Tight end	Lance Kendricks
Left tackle	Gabe Carimi
Left guard	John Moffitt
Center	Peter Konz
Right guard	Kevin Zeitler
Right tackle	Josh Oglesby
Kicker	Philip Welch

Position	Player
Defensive end	O'Brien Schofield
Defensive tackle	Dan Moore
Defensive tackle	Jeff Stehle
Defensive end	J. J. Watt
Outside linebacker	Jaevery McFadden
Middle linebacker	Culmer St. Jean
Outside linebacker	Mike Taylor
Cornerback	Devin Smith
Strong safety	Jay Valai
Free safety	Chris Maragos
Cornerback	Niles Brinkley
Punter	Brad Nortman

== Team players selected in the 2010 NFL draft ==
Player	Position	Round	Overall selection	NFL team
Garrett Graham	Tight end	4	118	Houston Texans
O'Brien Schofield	Defensive end	4	130	Arizona Cardinals
