= John Lovett (American football coach) =

American football player and coach (born 1950)

Personal information
- Born: December 1, 1950 (age 75); Nyack, New York, U.S.

Career information
- College: C.W. Post College

Career history

Coaching
- St. Joseph HS (NJ) (1976–1977) Assistant coach; Union (NY) (1978–1982) Assistant coach; Brown (1983) Assistant coach; New York Jets (1984) Assistant coach; Maine (1985–1988) Defensive coordinator & defensive backs coach; Cincinnati (1989–1992) Defensive coordinator; UNLV (1993) Defensive backs coach; Maine (1994) Defensive coordinator; Ole Miss (1995–1998) Defensive backs coach; Auburn (1999–2001) Defensive coordinator; Clemson (2002–2004) Defensive coordinator; Bowling Green (2005–2006) Defensive coordinator, linebackers coach, & defensive backs coach; North Carolina (2007–2008) Special teams coordinator; Miami (FL) (2009–2010) Defensive coordinator; Hartford Colonials (2011) Special teams coordinator; Texas Tech (2012) Defensive backs coach; Philadelphia Eagles (2013–2014) Defensive backs coach; California (2015–2016) Cornerbacks coach; Sam Houston State (2018) Special teams coordinator & linebackers coach

Operations
- Philadelphia Eagles (2015) Pro scout

John Lovett (born December 1, 1950) is an American football coach. He was the defensive backs coach for the Philadelphia Eagles of the National Football League (NFL) from 2013–2014. He was the defensive coordinator for Maine in 1994, Auburn from 1999–2001, Clemson from 2002–2004, Bowling Green from 2005–2006, and Miami from 2009–2010.

Lovett has coached in nine bowl games: the 1997 Motor City Bowl, 1998 Independence Bowl, 2000 Citrus Bowl, 2001 Peach Bowl, 2002 Tangerine Bowl, 2004 Peach Bowl, 2008 Meineke Car Care Bowl, 2009 Champs Sports Bowl, the 2010 Sun Bowl, and the 2012 Meineke Car Care Bowl of Texas.

== Playing career ==
Lovett graduated from C.W. Post College in December 1973 and was inducted into the school's Hall of Fame in fall 2008. Joining the team as a walk-on linebacker, Lovett quickly earned a scholarship and served as the team's co-captain his senior season. He played for Dom Anile, who is now a Consultant to Player Personnel for the Indianapolis Colts. At the completion of his career, Lovett enrolled in graduate school at the University of Denver, earning his Master's Degree in 1975.

== Coaching career ==
=== Early career ===
Upon graduation, Lovett began his career in coaching at Saint Joseph Regional High School in 1976. After two seasons as a prep school coach, he took his first collegiate coaching position as an assistant at Union College in 1978, where he was paid only $500 per year. In 1983, Lovett spent a season in the Ivy League at Brown University before moving back to New York to work under Joe Walton as the defensive quality control coach for the New York Jets of the National Football League in 1984.

=== Maine and Cincinnati (Tim Murphy) ===
The following season, Lovett was hired by Buddy Teevens as the defensive coordinator and defensive backs coach for the University of Maine Black Bears. In 1987, Tim Murphy took over as head coach and the team went on to win the conference championship and qualified for the Division I-AA playoffs.

When Murphy was hired as the new head coach of Cincinnati in 1989, Lovett joined him as the defensive coordinator for the Cincinnati Bearcats. He stayed at the school until 1993, when he was hired as the secondary coach for the UNLV Rebels.

In 1994, head coach Jack Cosgrove brought Lovett back to Maine to again serve as the school's defensive coordinator. Cosgrove had work alongside Lovett when he was offensive coordinator of the Black Bears before being named the head coach.

=== Ole Miss and Auburn (Tuberville) ===
In 1995, he joined new head coach Tommy Tuberville's staff at Ole Miss to coach the secondary. Four seasons later when Tuberville took the head coaching position at Auburn, Lovett followed him to the school, where he was named the defensive coordinator. Tuberville fired Lovett following the 2001 season.

=== Clemson ===
Lovett was hired by Tommy Bowden to serve as the defensive coordinator at Clemson from 2002–04, where he helped develop one of the ACC's top defenses. In 2004, Clemson was 11th in the nation in pass defense efficiency (103.4) and 26th in total defense (327.3 yds/g). In 2003, his defense allowed just 19.2 points per game as Clemson finished the year with nine wins and a top 25 national ranking.

=== Bowling Green ===
Lovett served as the defensive coordinator at Bowling Green from 2005–06. In addition to coordinating the defense at Bowling Green, Lovett coached linebackers in 2005 and defensive backs in 2006. In his first year with the Falcons, Lovett's defense ranked 20th in the country in turnover margin.

=== North Carolina ===
Lovett spent the 2007 and 2008 seasons as the special teams coordinator and a defensive assistant at North Carolina, where the kickoff coverage unit ranked among the nation's top 15 and the Tar Heels blocked six kicks in 2008. He coached the NCAA all-time leader in combined kick return yards in Brandon Tate, who also established the ACC career mark for kickoff return yards.

=== Miami ===
On February 12, 2009, Lovett was hired by coach Randy Shannon as the new defensive coordinator for the Miami Hurricanes. He served at the position for two seasons until being let go with the rest of the coaching staff following the firing of Randy Shannon at the end of the 2010 season.

=== Texas Tech ===
Lovett was hired by his former employer at Auburn, Tommy Tuberville, to serve as the Defensive backs coach for the Texas Tech Red Raiders.

=== Cincinnati ===
Following head coach Tommy Tuberville's departure to Cincinnati, Lovett remained a member of the Texas Tech staff through the 2012 Meineke Car Care Bowl of Texas. Following the game, it was announced on January 4, 2013 that Lovett would be following Tuberville to Cincinnati to accept the defensive backs coach position.

=== Philadelphia Eagles ===
On February 8, 2013, Lovett was named the defensive backs coach for the Philadelphia Eagles. On January 19, 2015, it was announced that Lovett would move to a job in the Eagles pro personnel department.

=== California ===
Lovett was named the cornerbacks coach for the California Golden Bears football team on July 27, 2015. He was released in January 2017 following Sonny Dykes' dismissal as head coach.
