= Scott Tolzien =

American football player (born 1987)

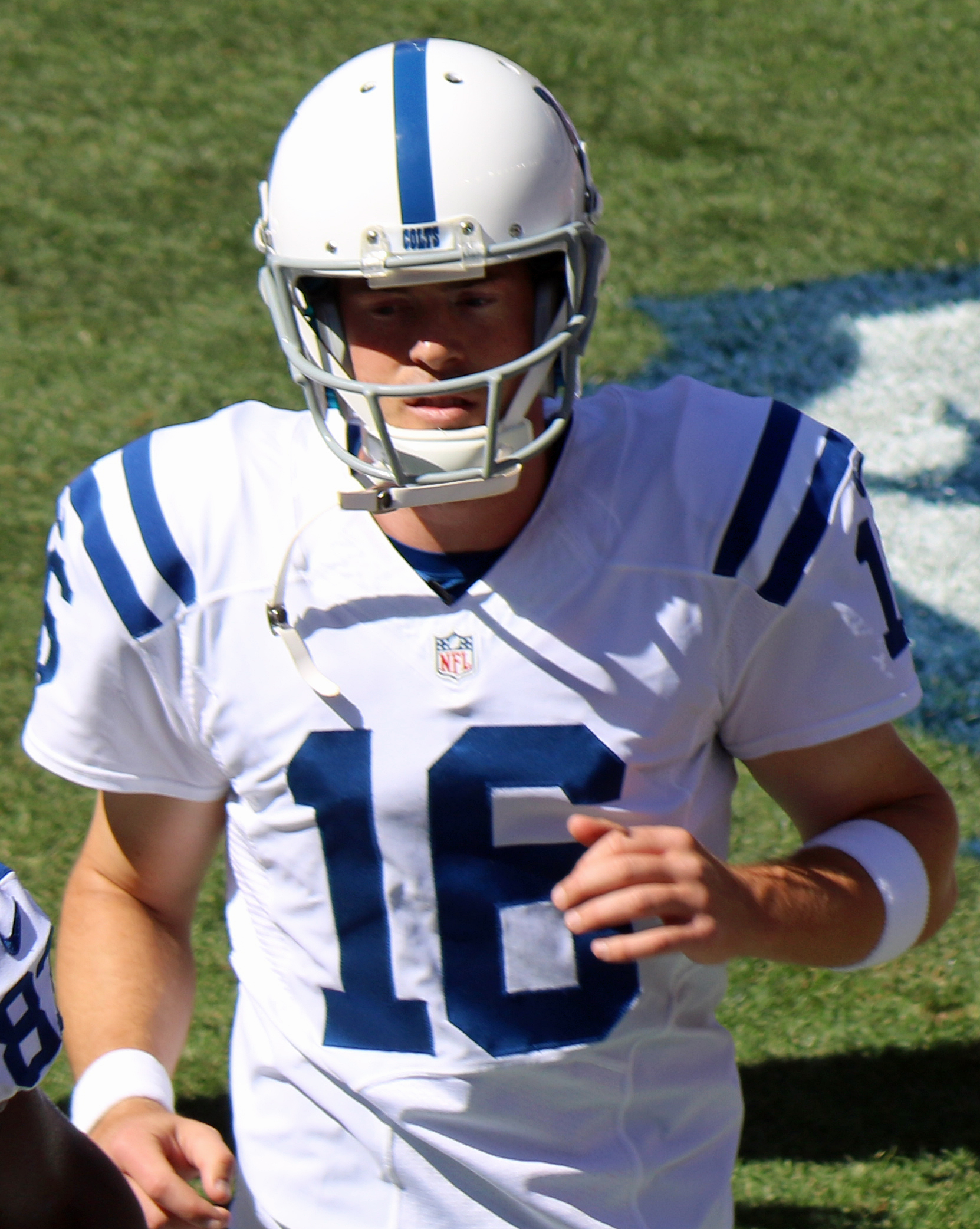
- Tolzien with the Indianapolis Colts in 2016

New Orleans Saints
- Title: Quarterbacks coach

Personal information
- Born: September 4, 1987 (age 39); Rolling Meadows, Illinois, U.S.
- Listed height: 6 ft 2 in (1.88 m)
- Listed weight: 215 lb (98 kg)

Career information
- Position: Quarterback (No. 16)
- High school: William Fremd (Palatine, Illinois)
- College: Wisconsin (2006–2010)
- NFL draft: 2011: undrafted

Career history

Playing
- San Diego Chargers (2011)*; San Francisco 49ers (2011–2012); Green Bay Packers (2013–2015); Indianapolis Colts (2016–2017); Birmingham Iron (2019)*
- * Offseason or practice squad member only

Coaching
- Wisconsin (2019) Analyst; Dallas Cowboys (2020–2022) Coaching assistant; Dallas Cowboys (2023–2024) Quarterbacks coach; New Orleans Saints (2025–present) Quarterbacks coach

Awards and highlights
- Johnny Unitas Golden Arm Award (2010); Second-team All-Big Ten (2010)

Career NFL statistics
- Passing attempts: 146
- Passing completions: 88
- Completion percentage: 60.3%
- TD–INT: 2–9
- Passing yards: 1,065
- Passer rating: 61.6
- Stats at Pro Football Reference

Scott Jeffery Tolzien (born September 4, 1987) is an American former professional football quarterback and coach who currently serves the quarterbacks coach for the New Orleans Saints of the National Football League (NFL). He played college football for the Wisconsin Badgers. He was signed by the San Diego Chargers as an undrafted free agent in 2011. He was also a member of the San Francisco 49ers, Green Bay Packers, and Indianapolis Colts.

== Early life ==
Tolzien was a two-star recruit out of William Fremd High School, located in Palatine, Illinois, a suburb northwest of Chicago. He made official visits to the University of Kentucky and the University of Toledo, but he did not attract many offers from major universities. He chose to attend the University of Wisconsin–Madison.

== College career ==
Tolzien attended and played college football for the University of Wisconsin from 2006–2010.

=== 2006 season ===
As a true freshman at Wisconsin in 2006, Tolzien was redshirted and did not play.

=== 2007 season ===
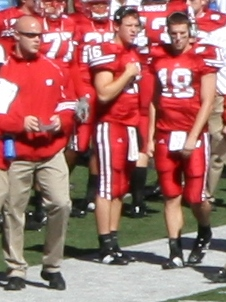
Tolzien (center) listens to the offensive coordinator with fellow Wisconsin quarterback Dustin Sherer (#18) in 2007

Tolzien did not play in any games for Wisconsin in 2007, as Wisconsin had Tyler Donovan, Allan Evridge, and Dustin Sherer at quarterback.

=== 2008 season ===
After Allan Evridge was benched following his performances against Michigan, Ohio State, and Penn State, Tolzien saw his first major action for Wisconsin against Iowa in Kinnick Stadium. He completed 5 passes on 8 attempts, but threw an interception in the red zone. Dustin Sherer eventually took charge of the Badgers, who finished the season 7–6.

=== 2009 season ===
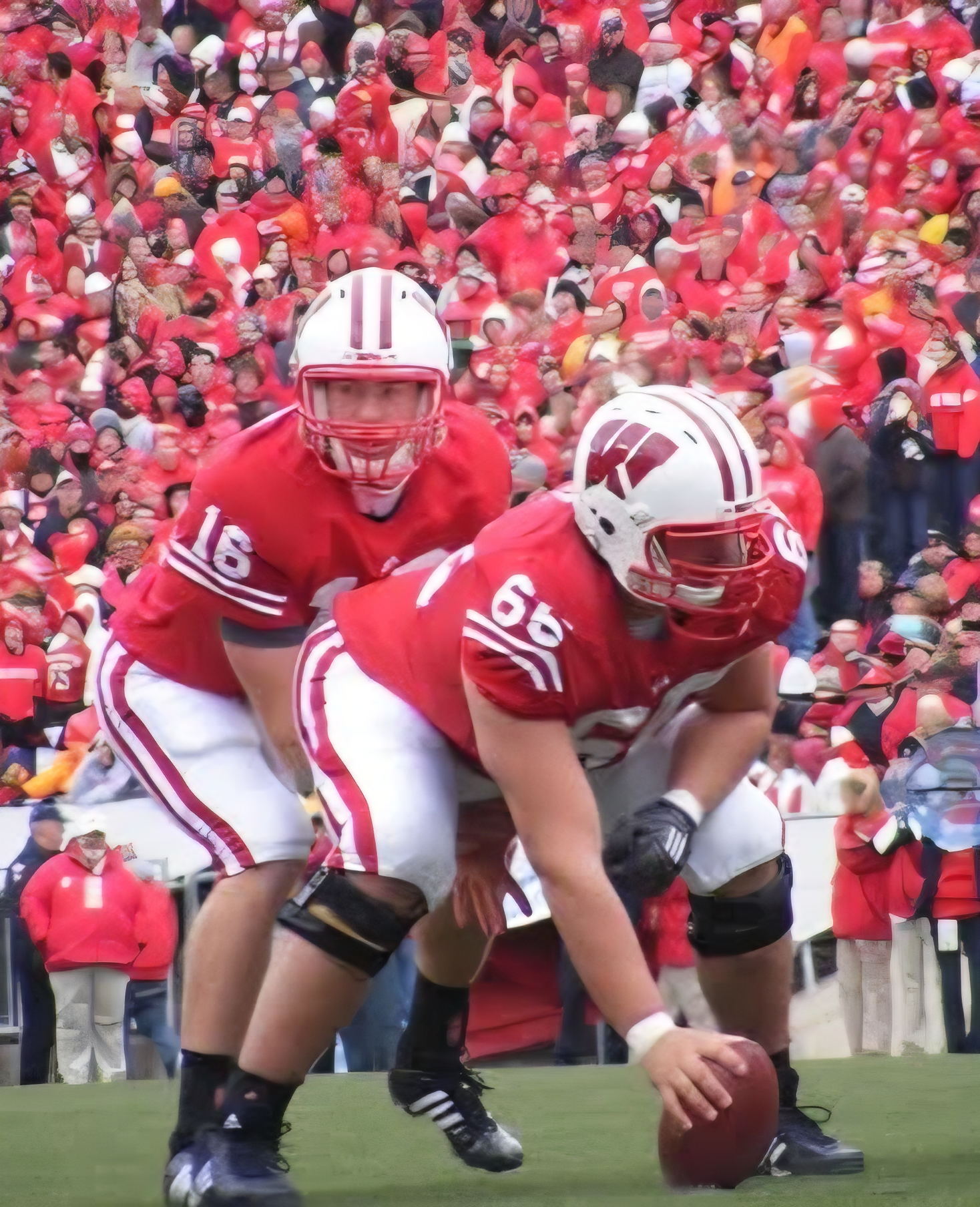
Tolzien during a game against Purdue on October 31, 2009

The winner of a spring quarterback competition, Tolzien beat out starter Sherer in 2009. He set the Wisconsin record for completions in a single season, with 211, and passed for 2,705 yards. Under Tolzien's leadership, Wisconsin finished the season at 9–3. He threw a pair of interceptions that were returned for touchdowns in a loss at Ohio State and threw three interceptions against Iowa the following week. Despite this, Tolzien played well in games against Michigan, Minnesota, and Michigan State, and was named Big Ten Offensive Player of the Week for his efforts against Michigan State.

Tolzien finished the 2009 season in a 20–14 win over Miami in the Champs Sports Bowl, completing 19 passes on 26 attempts as the Badgers knocked off the higher-ranked Hurricanes.

=== 2010 season ===
After a disappointing effort against Michigan State, Tolzien improved week after week as the Badgers won their next 7 games, to finish the year 11–1. Against a top 5 Ohio State defense, Tolzien completed 13 of 16 passes. His efforts led the Badgers to an eventual upset of then top-ranked Ohio State. The next week against Iowa, Tolzien again had a solid game, completing 20 passes on 26 attempts for 205 yards and a touchdown. Most impressively, Tolzien led the Badgers down the field for the game-winning touchdown with Wisconsin's running game stifled by Iowa's defense. In his final home start, against the Northwestern Wildcats, Tolzien completed 15 passes on 19 attempts for 230 yards with four touchdown passes.

Tolzien made his final collegiate start at Wisconsin in the Rose Bowl against one of the top defenses in the nation, TCU. He finished the game with 12 completions out of 21 attempts for 159 yards, no touchdowns and no interceptions and a rating of 120.7 for the game, and the Horned Frogs won, 21–19. Tolzein completed his college career at the East-West Shrine Game on January 22, 2011.

Tolzien won the Johnny Unitas Golden Arm Award in 2010, edging out finalists Andy Dalton of TCU, Colin Kaepernick of Nevada, Christian Ponder of Florida State, and Ricky Stanzi of Iowa, In 2010, he set a new Wisconsin record for completion percentage in a single season, completing 74.3% of his passes in 12 regular season games. Tolzien ranked 4th nationally in passer rating, and led the nation in completion percentage.

== Professional career ==
Pre-draft measurables
Height	Weight	Arm length	Hand span	Wingspan	40-yard dash	10-yard split	20-yard split	20-yard shuttle	Three-cone drill	Vertical jump	Broad jump	Wonderlic
6 ft 2 in (1.88 m)	212 lb (96 kg)	30 1/2 in (0.77 m)	10 in (0.25 m)	6 ft 0 1/2 in (1.84 m)	5.06 s	1.79 s	2.96 s	4.12 s	6.84 s	29.5 in (0.75 m)	9 ft 8 in (2.95 m)	38
All values are from NFL Combine

=== San Diego Chargers ===
After going undrafted in the 2011 NFL draft, Tolzien signed with the San Diego Chargers on July 26, 2011. He threw for 302 yards, one touchdown, and one interception in the preseason. On September 3, 2011, Tolzien was released by the Chargers during final team cuts.

=== San Francisco 49ers ===
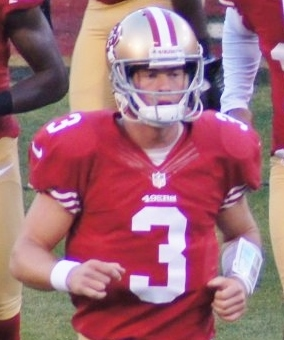
Tolzien with the San Francisco 49ers in 2012

On September 4, 2011, Tolzien was claimed off waivers by the San Francisco 49ers. He became the 49ers third-string quarterback behind starter Alex Smith and backup Colin Kaepernick. He remained with San Francisco after the conclusion of the 2012 preseason, still slotted as the team's third-string quarterback. He was on the roster for the 49ers appearance in Super Bowl XLVII. On August 26, 2013, Tolzien was waived by the 49ers.

=== Green Bay Packers ===
Tolzien was signed to the Green Bay Packers practice squad on September 1, 2013. After Aaron Rodgers suffered a clavicle injury, the Packers brought him up from the practice squad to the active roster. On November 10, 2013, Tolzien entered a game after an early injury to Rodgers's backup Seneca Wallace.

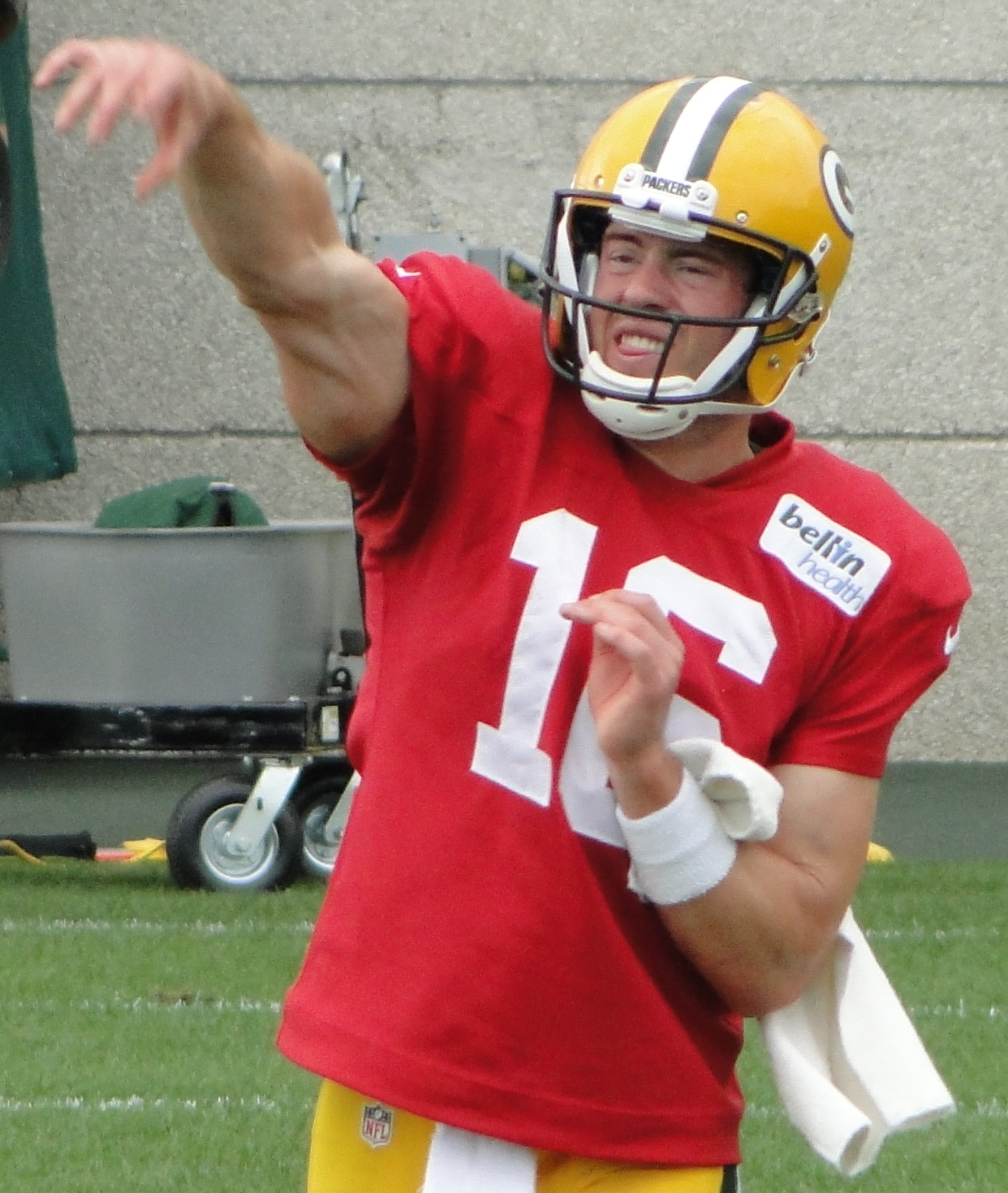
Tolzien with the Green Bay Packers in 2014

In his regular season debut, Tolzien completed 24-of-39 attempts for 280 yards, one touchdown and two interceptions in a 27–13 loss to the Philadelphia Eagles, earning him the start in the Packers' next game against the New York Giants. Against the Giants, Tolzien was 24 of 34 and threw for 339 yards, but also threw 3 interceptions in a 27–13 loss. The next week against the Vikings, Tolzien performed a spin move during a touchdown run before being relieved by quarterback Matt Flynn who led the Packers to a 26–26 tie against their divisional rival.

In the 2015 season, he appeared in three games for the Packers and had very limited roles.

=== Indianapolis Colts ===
On March 11, 2016, Tolzien signed a two-year contract with the Indianapolis Colts worth $3.50 million with $500,000 guaranteed. Due to a concussion to Andrew Luck, Tolzien made his first start for the Colts on Thanksgiving on November 24, 2016, throwing for 205 yards, one touchdown, and two interceptions in a 28–7 loss to the Pittsburgh Steelers.

With Luck being inactive due to a shoulder injury, Tolzien was named the starting quarterback to begin the 2017 season. On September 10, 2017, he started the season opener against the Los Angeles Rams. Tolzien had 128 passing yards with two interceptions returned for touchdowns, until being benched in favor for Jacoby Brissett. The Colts lost by a score of 46–9. Brissett started the next game against the Arizona Cardinals with Tolzien as the backup. After being benched, Tolzien had no more action in 2017. At the end of the year the Colts elected not to renew his contract, and he became a free agent.

=== Birmingham Iron ===
On November 27, 2018, Tolzien was selected by the Birmingham Iron of the Alliance of American Football in the third round of the 2019 AAF QB Draft.

Tolzien never played a down for the Iron as he retired before training camp began; the league would shut down abruptly eight weeks into its season.

== Career statistics ==
=== NFL ===
Year	Team	Games		Passing								Rushing				Fumbles	
Year	Team	GP	GS	Cmp	Att	Pct	Yds	Avg	TD	Int	Rtg	Att	Yds	Avg	TD	Fum	Lost
2011	SF	0	0	DNP													
2012	SF	0	0	DNP													
2013	GB	3	2	55	90	61.1	717	8.0	1	5	66.8	5	55	11.0	1	0	0
2014	GB	0	0	DNP													
2015	GB	3	0	1	1	100.0	4	4.0	0	0	83.3	3	−3	−1.0	0	1	0
2016	IND	3	1	23	37	62.2	216	5.8	1	2	64.7	6	3	0.5	0	1	0
2017	IND	1	1	9	18	50	128	7.1	0	2	33.8	2	2	1.0	0	1	0
Total		10	4	88	146	60.3	1,065	7.3	2	9	61.6	16	57	3.6	1	3	0

=== College ===
Year	Team	Games			Passing							Rushing			
Year	Team	GP	GS	Record	Cmp	Att	Yds	Pct	TD	Int	Rtg	Att	Yds	Avg	TD
2006	Wisconsin	0	0	—	Redshirted										
2007	Wisconsin	0	0	—	DNP										
2008	Wisconsin	3	0	—	5	8	107	62.5	0	1	149.9	4	13	3.3	1
2009	Wisconsin	13	13	10–3	211	328	2,705	64.3	16	11	143.0	54	8	0.1	2
2010	Wisconsin	13	13	11–2	194	266	2,459	72.9	16	6	165.9	30	−30	−1.0	0
Total		29	26	21–5	410	602	5,271	68.1	32	18	153.2	88	-9	-0.1	3

== Coaching career ==
=== Wisconsin ===
The Wisconsin Badgers hired Tolzien as an analyst to work on scouting opponents in 2019.

=== Dallas Cowboys ===
After the hiring of new Dallas Cowboys head coach Mike McCarthy, Tolzien joined the team's coaching staff under his former head coach as a coaching assistant. On February 24, 2023, Tolzien was promoted to quarterbacks coach. On January 26, 2025, Tolzien and the Cowboys parted ways following the expiration of his contract.

=== New Orleans Saints ===
On February 18, 2025, the New Orleans Saints hired Tolzien to serve as the team's quarterbacks coach.
