= 2009 Champs Sports Bowl =

American college football game

Miami Hurricanes	Wisconsin Badgers
(9–3)	(9–3)
ACC	Big Ten
14	20
Head coach: Randy Shannon	Head coach: Bret Bielema
AP / Coaches / BCS; 14 / 15 / 15	AP / Coaches / BCS; 24 / 22 / 25
	1	2	3	4	Total
Miami	7	0	0	7	14
Wisconsin	7	10	0	3	20
- Date: December 29, 2009
- Season: 2009
- Stadium: Florida Citrus Bowl
- Location: Orlando, Florida
- MVP: RB John Clay (Wisconsin)
- Referee: Hubert Owens (SEC)
- Attendance: 56,747
- Payout: US$2,225,000 per team

United States TV coverage
- Network: ESPN
- Announcers: Brad Nessler (Play by Play); Todd Blackledge (Analyst); Holly Rowe (Sideline)
- Nielsen ratings: 3.9

The 2009 Champs Sports Bowl was a college football bowl game between the Miami Hurricanes of the Atlantic Coast Conference and the Wisconsin Badgers of the Big Ten Conference. Played at the Citrus Bowl in Orlando, Florida, the game started at 8:00 p.m. US EST on Tuesday, December 29, 2009, and was televised by ESPN. Wisconsin won the game 20-14.

The 2009 game marked the last time in the foreseeable future that the Big 10 was represented in the bowl game. A four-year contract was signed so that starting in 2010 the Big East will send a team to the bowl instead.

Miami made its third appearance in the bowl, they last played in the game in 1998 where they easily defeated North Carolina State 46–23. The Canes won their two previous appearances. Meanwhile, Wisconsin made its second appearance in as many years. They were defeated in the 2008 game by Florida State 42–13.

The bowl game marked the fourth time that the two schools have faced each other and the first time in the post-season. Miami previously held a 2–1 series advantage (now 2-2) with the last meeting being a 51–3 thrashing by the Hurricanes in opening game of the 1989 season. Miami would go on to win their third national championship that year.

== Game summary ==
Miami wore their away white jerseys, and Wisconsin wore their home red jerseys.

Wisconsin sophomore tailback, John Clay rushed for 121 yards and two touchdowns on his way to being named the bowl MVP. Quarterback Scott Tolzien threw for 260 yards, and Montee Ball added 61 yards rushing for the Badgers, who defeated their first ranked opponent of the season and also reached the 10 win plateau for the first time since 2006. Miami quarterback Jacory Harris struggled for much of the game being sacked 5 times and knocked down on several other plays. Harris did finally find the endzone with 1:22 left in the game and finished with 188 yards passing.

The game displayed a sharp contrast in the locations of the two schools. Although played in the typical warm weather city of Orlando, the game time temperature was only about 40 degrees. Most Miami players wore long sleeves and would stand by heaters on the sidelines, however almost all Wisconsin players wore short sleeves and stated prior to the game that it felt like spring. The 56,747 fans in attendance was the highest total to ever watch a Champs Sports Bowl game since the game moved to Orlando in 2001. The attendance number also ranks second overall in bowl history as the only other game with more fans present was the 1990 Blockbuster Bowl played between Florida State and Penn State in Miami.

=== Scoring summary ===
Scoring Play	Score
1st Quarter
MIA — Graig Cooper 16-yard run (Matt Bosher kick), 14:37	MIA 7–0
WIS — John Clay 3-yard run (Philip Welch kick), 7:12	TIE 7–7
2nd Quarter
WIS — John Clay 3-yard run (Philip Welch kick), 8:07	WIS 14–7
WIS — Philip Welch 37-yard field goal, 0:12	WIS 17–7
3rd Quarter
None	
4th Quarter
WIS — Philip Welch 28-yard field goal, 4:01	WIS 20-7
MIA — Thearon Collier 14-yard pass from Jacory Harris (Matt Bosher kick), 1:22	WIS 20-14
