= Randy Shannon =

American football player and coach (born 1966)

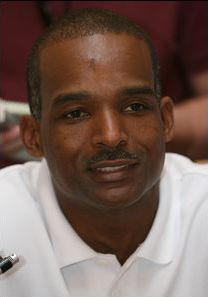
- Shannon in 2007

Personal information
- Born: February 24, 1966 (age 60); Miami, Florida, U.S.
- Listed height: 6 ft 0 in (1.83 m)
- Listed weight: 221 lb (100 kg)

Career information
- High school: Miami Norland (Miami Gardens, Florida)
- College: Miami (FL) (1984–1988)
- NFL draft: 1989: 11th round, 280th overall pick

Career history

Playing
- Dallas Cowboys (1989–1990)

Coaching
- Miami (FL) (1991) Graduate assistant; Miami (FL) (1992) Defensive line coach; Miami (FL) (1993–1997) Linebackers coach; Miami Dolphins (1998–1999) Defensive assistant; Miami Dolphins (2000) Linebackers coach; Miami (FL) (2001–2005) Defensive coordinator; Miami (FL) (2006) Defensive coordinator & linebackers coach; Miami (FL) (2007–2010) Head coach; TCU (2012) Linebackers coach; Arkansas (2013–2014) Linebackers coach; Florida (2015–2016) Associate head coach, co-defensive coordinator & linebackers coach; Florida (2017) Defensive coordinator; Florida (2017) Interim head coach; UCF (2018–2020) Defensive coordinator & linebackers coach; Florida State (2021) Senior defensive analyst; Florida State (2022–2024) Co-defensive coordinator & linebackers coach; Florida State (2024) interim defensive coordinator & linebackers coach

Awards and highlights
- As player: National champion (1987); As coach: 2× National champion (1991, 2001); Broyles Award (2001)

Career NFL statistics
- Games played: 17
- Stats at Pro Football Reference

Head coaching record
- Career: NCAA: 29–25 (.537)

Randy Leonard Shannon (born February 24, 1966) is an American football coach and former player. He is the co-defensive coordinator and linebackers coach for Florida State University, positions he has held since 2022. Shannon was the head coach at the University of Miami from 2007 to 2010 and has served as an assistant coach for the National Football League (NFL)'s Miami Dolphins and several college teams, including stints as the defensive coordinator for the Miami Hurricanes, the Florida Gators, and the UCF Knights. He won the Frank Broyles Award as the nation's top collegiate assistant coach while at Miami in 2001.

Shannon was born and raised in the Liberty City neighborhood of Miami, Florida. As a football player, he played linebacker for the Miami Hurricanes from 1985 to 1988 followed by two seasons in the NFL with the Dallas Cowboys, all under head coach Jimmy Johnson.

== Early life ==
Shannon was born in Miami, Florida, and grew up in the Liberty City neighborhood. When he was 3 years old, his father was murdered. His older twin brothers, who became addicted to crack cocaine when Shannon was 10, both died of AIDS, as did his older sister.

Shannon attended Miami Norland High School, where he earned All-state honors playing football as a defensive back in his senior year. He also played basketball, averaging 19 points a game, and was a member of the track team.

== College career ==
Shannon received a football scholarship to attend the University of Miami in Coral Gables, Florida, where he played for head coach Jimmy Johnson's Miami Hurricanes football team from 1985 to 1988.

He was converted into an outside linebacker as a redshirt freshman. The next year as a backup, he tallied 82 tackles (fifth on the team), including 13 against the University of Pittsburgh that was led by running back Craig Heyward.

As a junior, he was named the starter at strongside linebacker and was considered a coach on the field. In the first game, he returned an interception 41 yards for a touchdown against the University of Florida. He had 13 tackles against the University of Notre Dame and East Carolina University. He compiled 87 tackles (4 for loss), while helping the team win the 1987 national championship team.

As a senior, he was a part of a squad that ranked second in the nation in total defense. He had a career-high 14 tackles against the University of Michigan. He registered 83 tackles (fourth on the team), 8 tackles for loss (fourth on the team), 5 sacks (fourth on the team), 8 passes defensed (first on the team) and 3 forced fumbles (first on the team) and was included on several All-American lists as an honorable mention.

He graduated from the University of Miami with a bachelor's degree in 1988; he was the first member of his family to earn a college degree. Of the 25 games he started in his career, the Hurricanes won 24.

== Professional career ==
Shannon did not have the prototypical size of an NFL linebacker and wasn't picked in the 1989 NFL draft until the eleventh round (280th overall pick) by the Dallas Cowboys. The Cowboys were led by his former Hurricanes coach, Jimmy Johnson, who had accepted the NFL job after Shannon's senior season and had been charged with rebuilding a depleted Cowboys roster.

Shannon surprised some observers by making the team despite being a low round pick. He was named a starter in the third game of the season against the Washington Redskins, becoming the first Cowboys rookie to start at outside linebacker since Dave Edwards did it in 1963. In his 4 starts he made 38 tackles (including 11 both against the Redskins and the Green Bay Packers). He also was second on the team with 14 special teams tackles and played in all three linebacker spots, including middle linebacker on passing downs. He finished the season with 50 tackles, 3 quarterback pressures, one pass defensed and one forced fumble.

The Cowboys continued to develop their roster in the offseason and Shannon was cut at the end of the preseason in 1990. He returned to the Cowboys and appeared in a few games in September but was released on October 1, concluding his professional playing career. During his time in the league, Jimmy Johnson credited Shannon with teaching his "bigger, faster linebackers how to play the position." During his NFL career, Shannon played in 17 regular season games during the 1989 and 1990 seasons, starting four of them.

== Coaching career ==
=== Assistant coach ===
Miami Hurricanes head coach Dennis Erickson hired Shannon in 1991 to be a graduate assistant at his alma mater. He was promoted to defensive line coach the following year and spent the next several seasons coaching defensive line and linebackers at the school. In 1998, Shannon was hired as a defensive assistant by the NFL's Miami Dolphins, and he was promoted to be the Dolphin's linebackers coach in 2000.

In 2001, Miami Hurricanes head coach Larry Coker hired Shannon to be the Canes' defensive coordinator. That year Miami won the BCS National Championship, and Shannon received the Broyles Award recognizing him as the best assistant coach in college football. The Hurricanes' 2001 national championship team is widely considered to be one of the greatest college football teams of all time.

Shannon remained the Hurricanes defensive coordinator for six seasons, and his defenses consistently finished among the best in the nation:

- 2001 – 6th
- 2002 – 7th
- 2003 – 2nd
- 2004 – 28th
- 2005 – 4th
- 2006 – 7th

=== Miami Hurricanes head coach ===
Shannon was introduced as the head coach of Miami on December 8, 2006, replacing Larry Coker. Shannon reportedly agreed to a four-year deal worth over $4 million. He was the sixth African-American head coach at the time in Division I-A NCAA football. Coker stayed on to coach the team to a 21–20 MPC Computers Bowl victory over the University of Nevada; Shannon assumed all other functions, including recruiting, immediately upon his hiring.

==== 2007 season ====
Shannon's first decision as head coach was to remove the players' surnames from their jerseys, in order to emphasize the team over individual members. Some fans complained the decision made the game more difficult to follow. He also instituted a strict code of conduct for the program, a response to the frequent on-field and off-field misconduct that characterized Coker's latter tenure. Among other things, anyone caught with a gun would not only be kicked off the team, but also be thrown out of school as well.

The season opened with a victory over Marshall in his first game as head coach. The second game was a 51–13 loss to No. 6 University of Oklahoma. Miami rebounded by defeating Florida International, Duke, and then-16th ranked Texas A&M, but then lost close games to unranked North Carolina, Georgia Tech and North Carolina State. One highlight was Miami's fourth quarter comeback against rival Florida State. However, this was offset by a 48–0 loss against No. 21 University of Virginia in the team's final appearance ever at the Orange Bowl, the worst loss for the program in the history of its play at the Orange Bowl and the worst overall loss since 1998. Miami finished the season losing to No. 16 Boston College 28–14. Under Shannon, the team lost six out of their last seven games, finishing with a 5–6 record and failing to qualify for a bowl game for the first time in over a decade. It was also the first time in 25 years that the Hurricanes had missed a bowl game while having a full complement of scholarships.

Two days after the season ended, one of Miami's former players, Sean Taylor, was shot in his home in Miami. Shannon expressed frustration over the media's handling of such incidents, stating that the coverage made Miami look like a haven for crime.

==== 2008 season ====
Shannon's squad finished the 2008 season with a 7–6 record (4-4 ACC) and a loss to Cal in the Emerald Bowl. The regular season was highlighted by losses to eventual National Champion Florida and rival Florida State, and a surprising victory over eventual ACC Champion Virginia Tech. The 'Canes briefly returned to the Top 25 rankings for the first time since early in the 2006 season before surrendering 472 rushing yards to Georgia Tech in a 41–23 late-November loss that eliminated Miami from ACC Championship contention. Tech's 472 yards on the ground were the second most ever allowed by Miami. Miami then received an invitation to the Emerald Bowl in San Francisco, where the Hurricanes fell 24–17 to Cal.

In the immediate aftermath of the bowl game, Shannon fired his offensive coordinator, Patrick Nix, over philosophical differences. Nix wanted to employ more of a spread attack, whereas Shannon remained committed to Miami's traditional pro style offense. Shannon eventually hired former Pittsburgh Steelers and Philadelphia Eagles assistant coach Mark Whipple for the position.

Nix's departure was followed by news that Robert Marve, a redshirt-freshman quarterback who had been suspended from the bowl game for repeatedly missing class, asked for a release to transfer to another school. Marve cited a strained relationship with Shannon, who had previously suspended him after his arrest for criminal mischief, as his reason for leaving. Marve was the only Hurricanes player to be arrested during Shannon's tenure as head coach.

Shannon's staff suffered more upheaval when defensive coordinator Bill Young left to assume the same position at Oklahoma State, his alma mater, in late January. Young's departure made him the third coordinator to leave the program during Shannon's two seasons as head coach, joining Nix and former defensive coordinator Tim Walton, both of whom were fired. North Carolina assistant John Lovett was hired to replace Young in February.

==== 2009 season ====
Shannon's Hurricanes showed improvement in the 2009 season, in which the Canes finished with a record of 9–4. The Canes were the first college football team in nine years to face four consecutive ranked teams to start the season. They surpassed expectations by going 3–1 in those games, including wins over No. 19 Florida State, No. 13 Georgia Tech, and No. 8 Oklahoma. The Hurricanes went 6–2 over the remainder of the regular season, then lost 20–14 against No. 22 Wisconsin in the Citrus Bowl. Miami finished the season ranked No. 19 in the country. It marked the second consecutive year that Shannon's team had shown a two-win improvement.

==== 2010 season ====
The Hurricanes started the year with high expectations, ranked 13th in the Associated Press and Coaches Poll. However, after winning three of their first four games, they were beaten at home by No. 24 Florida State, 45–17. They went 4–3 over the rest of the regular season, with losses to Virginia, No. 15 Virginia Tech and South Florida. Though they were ranked in the top-25 until the final two games of the season, the season-ending loss to South Florida left them unranked heading into the Sun Bowl.

==== Off-the-field record ====
Although he left Miami with an unremarkable win–loss record by the program's previous standards, Shannon still left a significant legacy at the program. He guided the school to the third-best Academic Progress Rate in NCAA Division I FBS. In his four-year tenure at Miami, only a single player was arrested. Perhaps most significantly, he was apparently untainted by the scandal that engulfed the program in the 2011 season, as he avoided contact with Nevin Shapiro, the rogue booster who admitted to providing massive amounts of improper benefits to Miami players from 2002 to 2010. Sports Illustrated writer Alexander Wolff, in an August 2011 open letter to university president Donna Shalala, noted that Shannon "seems to have been the only person in Coral Gables who wanted nothing to do with Shapiro, reportedly warning his players to avoid him and threatening to fire assistants caught dealing with him."

Though Shannon's teams went through some struggles on the field, he consistently brought in recruiting classes ranked in the top 25. Three members of his second recruiting class—Marcus Forston, Sean Spence and Marcus Robinson—were recognized by College Football News as freshman All-Americans.

After the South Florida loss, the university announced its decision to terminate Shannon immediately. Offensive line coach Jeff Stoutland served as interim head coach for the Sun Bowl, a 33–17 loss to Notre Dame.

=== TCU Horned Frogs linebackers coach ===
In July 2012, Shannon became the linebackers coach at TCU. Shannon participated in his first game as a member of the TCU coaching staff on September 8, 2012, a 56–0 victory over Grambling. As of October 2, TCU was undefeated and ranked 2nd in the nation in scoring defense, allowing only 7.3 points per game. They ranked 2nd in passing efficiency defense, 2nd in interceptions, 9th in rushing defense, and 7th in total yards allowed per game.

=== Arkansas Razorbacks linebackers coach ===
In December 2012, Shannon was hired by the new incoming Arkansas Razorbacks coach Bret Bielema to be a part of his staff as a linebackers coach and be a major part of their recruiting efforts in south Florida. Shannon was promoted to associate head coach before the 2014 season.

=== Florida Gators associate head coach / defensive coordinator ===
Shannon returned to his home state in January 2015 when he became the Florida Gators' associate head coach, co-defensive coordinator and linebackers coach under new head coach Jim McElwain. McElwain stated that Shannon was at the top of his list for potential assistants, and media sports commentators opined that Shannon would be a significant recruiting asset for McElwain and the Gators, especially in south Florida. With Shannon serving as the co-coordinator with Geoff Collins, the Florida defense was ranked in the top 20 in the nation in 2015 and fifth nationally in 2016.

Collins accepted the head coaching position at Temple in December 2016, and Shannon was promoted to be Florida's full-time defensive coordinator for the 2017 season. On October 29, 2017, he became Florida's interim head coach when Jim McElwain was fired eight games into the season. Shannon coached the Gators to a 1–3 record to finish the year, after which Florida hired Dan Mullen to be the Gators' new head coach. Mullen brought in an entirely new coaching staff, and Shannon was not retained.

=== UCF Knights defensive coordinator ===
On December 5, 2017, Shannon was hired as the defensive coordinator for the University of Central Florida (UCF). On January 27, 2021, after head coach Josh Heupel left for the Tennessee Volunteers, Shannon became the interim head coach for the Knights until the hiring of Gus Malzahn, at which point Malzahn dismissed the previous staff to bring in coaches of his choice.

=== FSU Co-defensive coordinator & linebackers coach ===
In April 2021, Shannon was hired to be the senior defensive analyst for the Florida State Seminoles football team quickly helping as an assistant linebackers coach as well. On December 11, 2021, Shannon was named Co-Defensive Coordinator and Linebackers coach.

== Head coaching record ==
Year	Team	Overall	Conference	Standing	Bowl/playoffs	Coaches^{#}	AP^{°}
Miami Hurricanes (Atlantic Coast Conference) (2007–2010)
2007	Miami	5–7	2–6	5th (Coastal)			
2008	Miami	7–6	4–4	T–3rd (Coastal)	L Emerald		
2009	Miami	9–4	5–3	3rd (Coastal)	L Champs Sports	19	19
2010	Miami	7–5	5–3	2nd (Coastal)	Sun*		
Miami:		28–22	16–16	*Shannon was fired from Miami before bowl game.			
Florida Gators (Southeastern Conference) (2017)
2017	Florida	1–3*	0–2	5th (Eastern)			
Florida:		1–3	0–2	*Shannon was named Florida's interim head coach on Oct 29			
Total:		29–25					
^{#}Rankings from final Coaches Poll.; ^{°}Rankings from final AP Poll.
