= Chris Maragos =

American football player (born 1987)

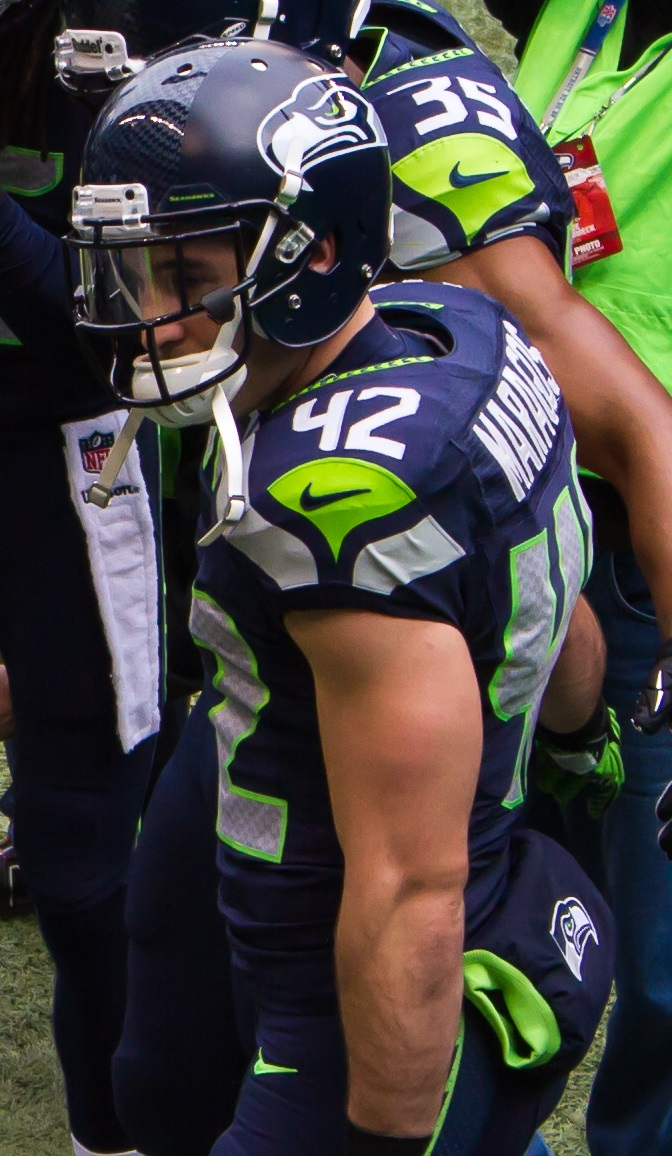
- Maragos with the Seahawks in 2013

No. 40, 42
- Position: Safety

Personal information
- Born: January 6, 1987 (age 39); Racine, Wisconsin, U.S.
- Listed height: 5 ft 10 in (1.78 m)
- Listed weight: 200 lb (91 kg)

Career information
- High school: Horlick (Racine)
- College: Western Michigan; Wisconsin
- NFL draft: 2010: undrafted

Career history
- San Francisco 49ers (2010); Seattle Seahawks (2011–2013); Philadelphia Eagles (2014–2018)

Awards and highlights
- 2× Super Bowl champion (XLVIII, LII)

Career NFL statistics
- Total tackles: 93
- Forced fumbles: 1
- Fumble recoveries: 2
- Defensive touchdowns: 1
- Stats at Pro Football Reference

Chris Maragos (born January 6, 1987) is an American former professional football player who was a safety and special teamer in the National Football League (NFL). He played college football for the Western Michigan Broncos before transferring to the Wisconsin Badgers. Maragos was signed by the San Francisco 49ers as an undrafted free agent in 2010. He also played for the Seattle Seahawks and Philadelphia Eagles.

== Early life ==
Maragos was a football and track star for three years at Park High School in Racine, Wisconsin. During his junior year in 2003, he started at wide receiver for Park's varsity team. After securing a playoff berth, Park was eliminated in the first round of the playoffs by eventual state championship runner-up Arrowhead. During the off-season, Park's longtime head coach retired, leading to a changing of the guard in the football program.

Citing philosophical differences with the new regime, Maragos transferred to Racine's Horlick High School, which featured a pass-happy spread offense and emerging quarterback talent Justin Kammler. Maragos's first game as a Horlick Rebel was a road contest against his former school in August 2004. The rivalry game quickly became a lopsided affair, as Maragos dominated his former team with nine catches, 115 yards receiving, and a touchdown en route to a 29–6 victory. According to Rebels coach George Machado, Maragos was heaped with verbal abuse during the game but "he maintained himself with class." Maragos continued his torrid stretch in the first four games of his senior season, recording 27 catches for 359 yards and two touchdowns.

During this time, Machado called Maragos "one of the best [football players] to play here" and "a gentleman, [and] a good student, [who] comes from a strong family. He is a very strong positive influence on this football team." His statistics and the Rebels' offensive production dipped when Kammler was sidelined with an injury. Maragos made a statement with his talent, being named Horlick Player of the Year and first-team All-Racine County, All-Southeast Conference, and All-Region.

As he weighed his collegiate options, Maragos eventually chose to attend Western Michigan, a school already home to future NFL Pro Bowl receiver Greg Jennings.

== College career ==
Maragos redshirted at Western Michigan in 2005, where he played as a wide receiver. Upon arrival at the school, the first player to introduce himself to Maragos was senior wide receiver Greg Jennings. He became somewhat of a mentor to Maragos, teaching him the intricacies of excelling as a collegiate wide receiver and giving him rides to church on Sundays. Maragos was inspired by the star player's dedication to his craft, saying, "he would always be first in the meetings, front row, pen out, ready to learn, ready to do things."

After starting eight games at wide receiver for Western Michigan during the 2006 season, Maragos transferred to Wisconsin and sat out a year (due to NCAA transfer rules) before resuming play in 2008. During this time, he was converted to defense, where he became a standout free safety. In two years with the Badgers he recorded five interceptions and 94 tackles. Maragos had six passes defensed in his 2009 senior season, including one that helped end a comeback attempt by Northern Illinois and secure a 28-20 Badger victory. He was also Wisconsin's placekicking holder for extra points and field goals. During a 2009 road game against Ohio State, he scored a touchdown at that position on a fake field goal attempt.

== Professional career ==
Pre-draft measurables
Height	Weight	40-yard dash	10-yard split	20-yard split	20-yard shuttle	Three-cone drill	Vertical jump	Broad jump	Bench press
5 ft 10 5/8 in (1.79 m)	200 lb (91 kg)	4.49 s	1.53 s	2.55 s	3.98 s	6.52 s	36.0 in (0.91 m)	10 ft 1 in (3.07 m)	15 reps
All values from Pro Day

=== San Francisco 49ers ===
Maragos was undrafted in the 2010 NFL draft. He signed with the San Francisco 49ers on April 26, 2010.

Maragos entered 2010 training camp for a 49ers club trying to build on a promising 2009 campaign. On August 22, he appeared in a nationally televised game against the Minnesota Vikings on NBC's Sunday Night Football. The program achieved the highest ratings for a Week Two preseason game in seven years, as it featured the heavily publicized return of Brett Favre for a 20th and final NFL season.

Despite a training camp performance that garnered favorable reviews from local beat reporters, Maragos was released by the 49ers on September 3. On September 5, Maragos was added to the 49ers' practice squad, where he spent the first part of the 2010 season. On October 18, Maragos was added to the 49ers' active roster for a game in Charlotte against the Carolina Panthers, though he did not play in the contest. The following week, on October 28, Maragos and the team flew across the world to London for a game against the Denver Broncos. Upon arrival, Maragos was informed that he had been released from the 49ers. The rare timing of the release gained widespread attention when ESPN reporter Adam Schefter tweeted about the oddity. Maragos was signed to the practice squad and able to remain with the team in London, instead of being forced to fly back home immediately.

He again joined the San Francisco active roster on November 30, and made his NFL playing debut at Lambeau Field on December 5, facing the team from his home state, the Green Bay Packers. During that game he recorded his first NFL career tackle against the eventual Super Bowl XLV champions.

After the 2010 season, the 49ers fired head coach Mike Singletary and replaced him with Stanford head coach Jim Harbaugh. The coaching shakeup led to an influx of new safeties, which resulted in greater competition for a roster spot. Consequently, Maragos saw his tenure with the 49ers come to end as he was released on September 3, 2011.

=== Seattle Seahawks ===
Maragos was signed to the Seattle Seahawks' practice squad on September 22, 2011. Seattle was rebuilding its roster, and head coach Pete Carroll and general manager John Schneider were impressed with Maragos's apparent work ethic and character. The Seahawks promoted him to the active roster on October 22. After a rough start to the 2011 season, Seattle finished the year with a 7–9 record. In 2012, the Seahawks became a legitimate Super Bowl contender, going 11-5 and winning a road playoff game against the Washington Redskins. During his stint with the Seahawks, Maragos was routinely awarded the team honor for "Special Teams Player of the Week."

On April 11, 2013, Maragos signed a one-year contract with the Seahawks for $1.32 million. After reaching the agreement, Maragos expressed gratitude to the franchise. "It's phenomenal. Just to be in a position like this is humbling and I'm truly fortunate to be a part of such a great organization. To continue my career as a Seahawk, I couldn't be any happier." On September 6, 2013, Maragos accepted a pay cut to $855,000 to remain a Seahawk.

In 2013, the Seahawks secured the top playoff seed in the NFC with a conference-best 13–3 record. After a bye week, Seattle defeated the New Orleans Saints in the playoffs. The Seahawks then beat the San Francisco 49ers in the NFC Championship Game to advance to Super Bowl XLVIII. On February 2, 2014, Maragos and the Seahawks defeated the Denver Broncos 43–8 in the third-most lopsided Super Bowl in history. It was the most-watched program in the history of American television.

=== Philadelphia Eagles ===
On March 12, 2014, Maragos signed a three-year, $4 million contract with the Philadelphia Eagles. On December 6, 2015, his blocked punt was returned for a touchdown in Philadelphia's 35–28 upset win over the New England Patriots.

On November 17, 2016, Maragos signed a three-year, $6 million contract extension with $2.45 million guaranteed through the 2019 season.

On October 19, 2017, Maragos was placed on injured reserve after suffering a knee injury in Week 6 against the Carolina Panthers. It would be the final game of his career. Without Maragos, the Eagles went on to win Super Bowl LII against the New England Patriots 41–33, earning Maragos his second Super Bowl ring. Maragos was placed on the physically unable to perform list to start the 2018 season while recovering from the knee injury. On February 22, 2019, Maragos was released by the Eagles. On July 16, 2019, Maragos announced his retirement from the NFL. In February 2023, Maragos was awarded $43.5 million in damages after he filed a negligence suit against doctors responsible for treating his 2017 injury.

== Personal life ==
Maragos is an American of Greek and Italian descent.

Maragos' brother Troy is the Senior Pastor at Racine Bible Church in Racine, Wisconsin.

Maragos married Serah (née West) on April 9, 2010. They are parents to three children.
