= Graig Cooper =

American football player (born 1987)

No. 24, 43
- Position: Running back

Personal information
- Born: July 12, 1987 (age 39); Memphis, Tennessee, U.S.
- Listed height: 5 ft 10 in (1.78 m)
- Listed weight: 202 lb (92 kg)

Career information
- College: Miami
- NFL draft: 2011: undrafted

Career history
- Philadelphia Eagles (2011–2012)*
- * Offseason or practice squad member only
- Stats at Pro Football Reference

Graig Cooper (born July 12, 1987) is an American former professional football running back. After playing college football for Miami, he was signed by the Philadelphia Eagles as an undrafted free agent in 2011. He spent the 2011 and 2012 offseasons with the Eagles.

== Early life ==
Cooper played for Melrose High School he was also Named Mr. Football in Tennessee in 2005, Cooper was selected to first-team All-State in 2005, when he led his team to the state championship and rushed for 2,123 yards and 30 touchdowns, also gaining 291 yards on receptions, with two touchdowns. At Milford Prep, Cooper led the team in rushing with 1,327 yards and 15 touchdowns in eight games, averaging 12.5 yards per carry (missed two games with neck and hamstring injuries). In 2006, he was ranked the No. 4 overall player in the state of Tennessee by Rivals.com, rated the No. 10 running back by Scout.com, and ranked the No. 28 running back by ESPN. In 2007, he was ranked as the No. 6 running back by Scout.com. This PrepStar All-American chose Miami over Oklahoma State, Tennessee, and Mississippi.

== College career ==
Cooper began his college career at the University of Miami in 2007. In his first game as a Miami Hurricane, Cooper rushed for 116 yards on 12 carries against Marshall University. Graig Cooper finished his Freshman season with 125 carries for 682 yards and 4 touchdowns, and he caught 13 passes for 129 yards and 1 touchdown.

		Rushing						Receiving					Passing					Punt returns					Kick returns				
Season	Team	GP	Att	Yds	Avg	Long	TD	Rec	Yds	Avg	Long	TD	Cmp	Att	Yds	TD	Long	PR	Yds	Avg	TD	Long	KR	Yds	Avg	TD	Long
2007	Miami	11	125	682	5.5	56	4	13	129	9.9	25	1	--	--	--	--	--	16	76	4.8	--	16	--	--	--	--	--
2008	Miami	12	159	841	4.9	51	4	29	113	3.9	11	1	1	1	51	1	51	3	90	30.0	1	66	4	89	22.2	0	26
2009	Miami	12	134	695	5.2	70	4	18	132	7.3	25	1	0	1	0	0	0	4	8	2.0	0	9	26	582	22.4	0	26
Career	Total	35	418	2218	5.2	70	12	60	374	7.0	25	3	1	2	51	1	51	23	184	12.3	1	66	30	671	22.3	0	26

== Professional career ==
=== Philadelphia Eagles ===
Cooper was signed by the Philadelphia Eagles as an undrafted free agent following the 2011 NFL draft on July 25, 2011. He was waived during final cuts on September 2. He was re-signed following the 2011 season on January 4, 2012. Cooper was waived by the Eagles once again on May 30, 2012.
