= John Clay (running back) =

American football player (born 1988)

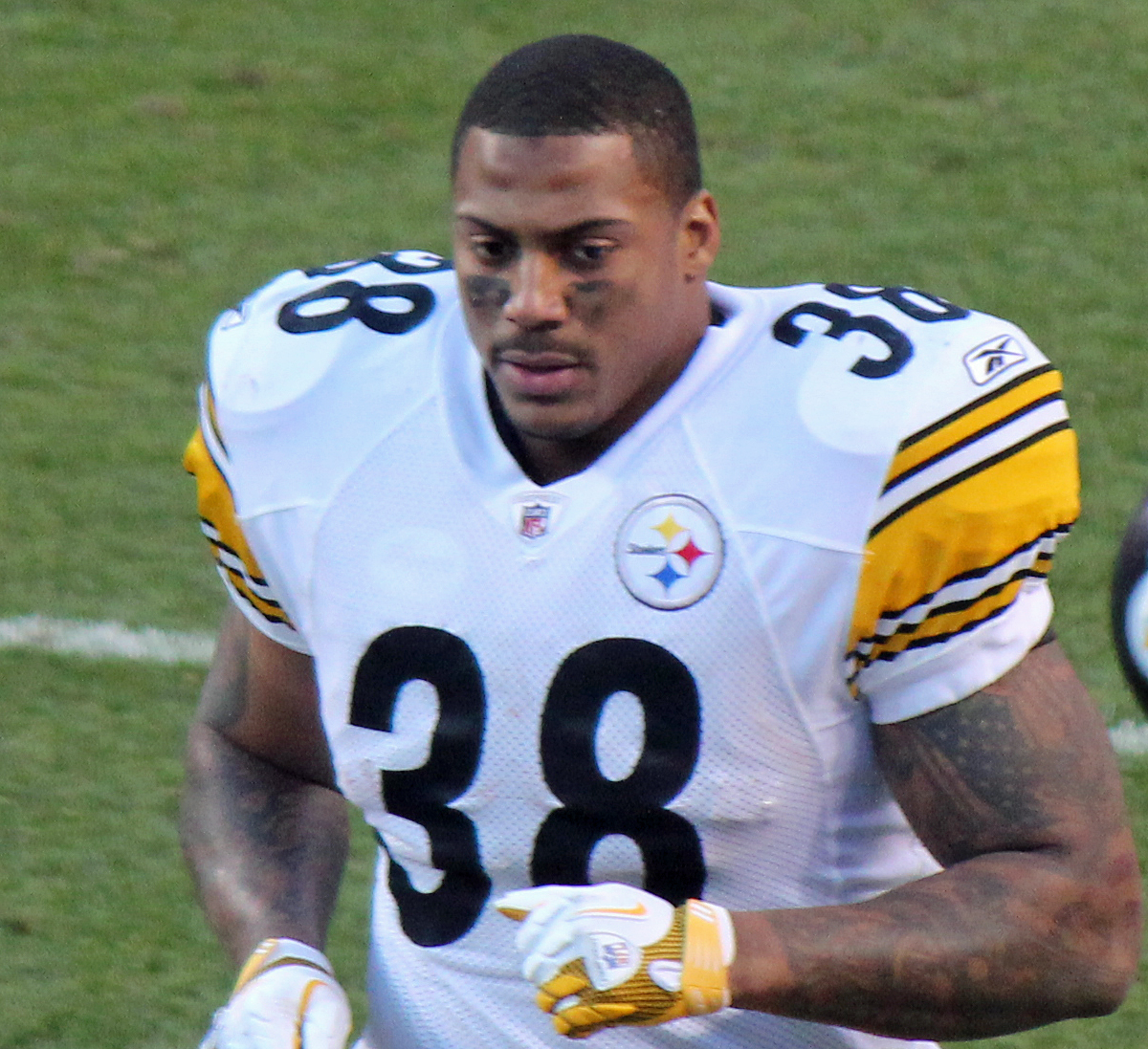
- Clay with the Pittsburgh Steelers in 2011

No. 38
- Position: Running back

Personal information
- Born: January 4, 1988 (age 38); Racine, Wisconsin, U.S.
- Listed height: 6 ft 1 in (1.85 m)
- Listed weight: 248 lb (112 kg)

Career information
- High school: Washington Park (Racine)
- College: Wisconsin (2007–2010)
- NFL draft: 2011: undrafted

Career history
- Pittsburgh Steelers (2011)

Awards and highlights
- Third-team All-American (2010); Big Ten Offensive Player of the Year (2009); First-team All-Big Ten (2009); Second-team All-Big Ten (2010)

Career NFL statistics
- Rushing attempts: 10
- Rushing yards: 41
- Rushing touchdowns: 1
- Stats at Pro Football Reference

John Clay (born January 4, 1988) is an American former professional football player who was a running back in the National Football League (NFL). He played college football for the Wisconsin Badgers and was signed by the Pittsburgh Steelers as an undrafted free agent after the 2011 NFL draft.

In high school, he received numerous awards for his accomplishments on the field at Washington Park High School, being named to the Racine County Sports Hall of Fame in 2018, and was one of the most heavily recruited players in the country. Clay was ruled ineligible to play by the NCAA after not meeting Wisconsin admission requirements before being ruled eligible for the 2008 season.

== High school ==
Clay attended Washington Park High School in Racine, Wisconsin. He was named a high school All-American in 2006 and played in the U.S. Army All-American Bowl game. A 4-star recruit, he committed to Wisconsin on national signing day after declining offers from Tennessee, Ohio State, Nebraska, and Iowa.

After graduating from high school and before the start of summer football camp, Clay was notified by the NCAA that his grades had not met the requirements to play collegiate football. He had recorded a 2.7 core GPA and received a 7 on his ACT. Clay attended summer school to complete the required course work, then rejoined his teammates and began practicing with the Badgers. His late start forced him to redshirt in 2007.

=== Honors ===
- 2006 WIAA Division 1 State Champion
- U.S. Army All-American Bowl
- Tom Lemming's Top 10 of 2007
- All-State
- All-Area
- Rival's 100
- 2009 Big Ten offensive player of the year
- 2009 All-Big Ten 1st team
- 2009 Champs Sports Bowl MVP

== College career ==
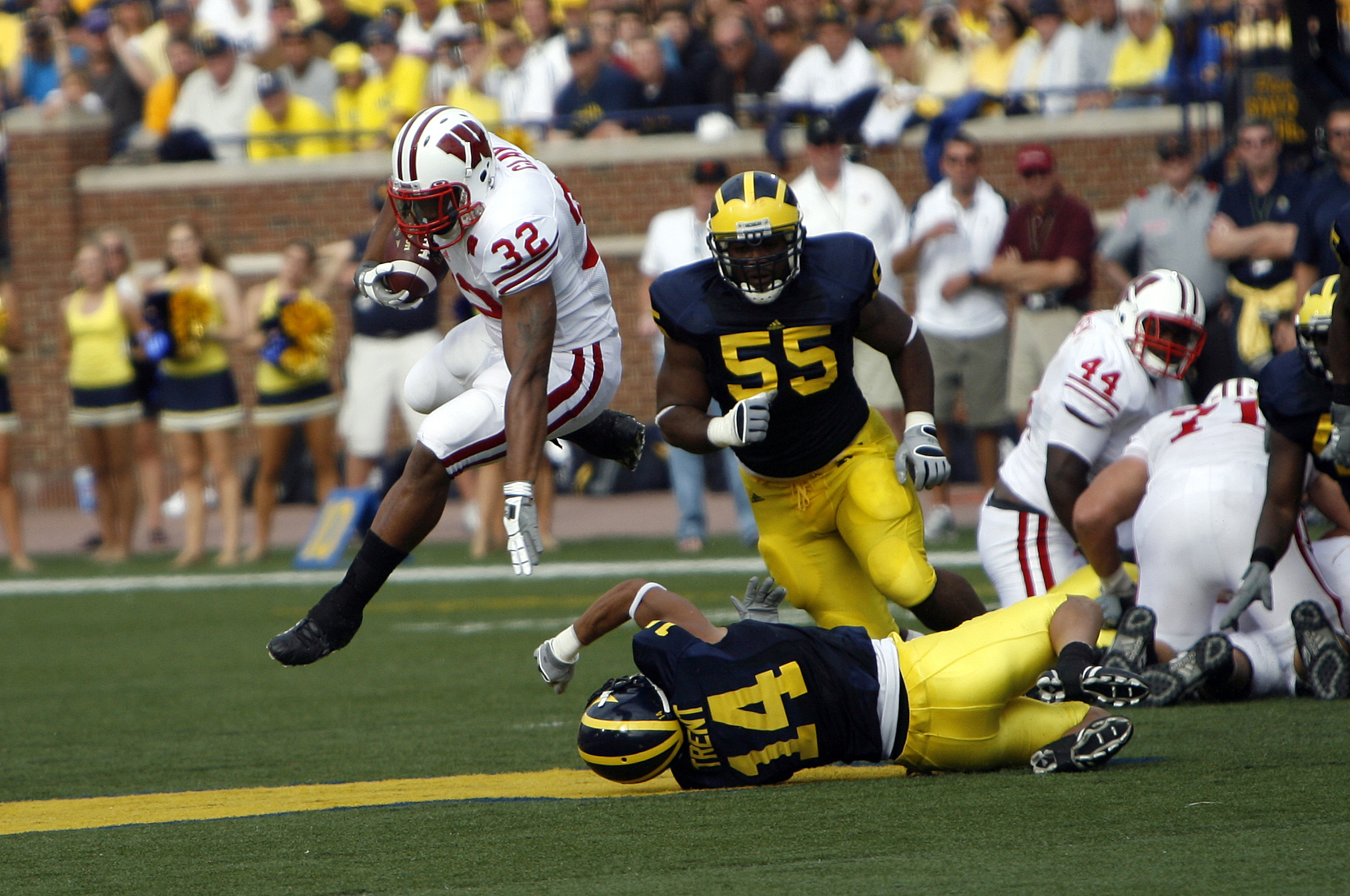
Clay carries the ball against Michigan in 2008

As a redshirt freshman in 2008, Clay saw his first action on the field against the University of Akron, where he posted 71 yards and his first collegiate touchdown on just 12 carries. He finished the season second on the team and seventh in the Big Ten Conference in rushing with 884 yards on 155 carries and nine touchdowns.

In 2009, Clay led the Big Ten and ranked eighth in the country with 1,517 rushing yards. His 18 rushing touchdowns also led the Big Ten and tied for seventh in the nation. On November 23, 2009, Clay was named Big Ten Offensive Player of the Year, the third Badgers' player to be so named Big Ten, joining fellow running backs Ron Dayne (1999) and Brent Moss (1993).

Clay was on the cover of the December 11, 2009 edition of Sports Illustrated, an issue that featured the best sports photos of 2009. The picture was taken during the Michigan game at Camp Randall Stadium.

Clay entered the 2010 football season on the preseason watch lists for the Doak Walker Award, the Walter Camp Award, and the Maxwell Award. He was selected as a Playboy All-American. An MCL injury sidelined Clay for the last three 2010 regular season games, damaging his chances at the Heisman. Clay was named one of three finalists for the 2010 Doak Walker Award, which is given annually to the nation's top running back. The other two finalists were Kendall Hunter of Oklahoma State and the winner of the award, LaMichael James of Oregon.

For the 2010 season, Clay finished with 1,012 rushing yards and 14 rushing touchdowns.

=== Statistics ===
Year	Team	Attempts	Yards	Average	Long	TDs
2008	Wisconsin	155	884	5.7	46	9
2009	Wisconsin	277	1,517	5.5	72	18
2010	Wisconsin	187	1,012	5.4	40	14
College totals		619	3,413	5.5	72	41

== Professional career ==
On January 7, 2011, Clay announced he would forgo his senior season to enter the 2011 NFL draft.

Pre-draft measurables
Height	Weight	Arm length	Hand span	Wingspan	40-yard dash	10-yard split	20-yard split	20-yard shuttle	Three-cone drill	Vertical jump	Broad jump	Bench press	Wonderlic
6 ft 0 1/2 in (1.84 m)	230 lb (104 kg)	31 in (0.79 m)	8 3/4 in (0.22 m)	6 ft 5 1/4 in (1.96 m)	4.74 s	1.63 s	2.73 s	4.30 s	7.10 s	33.0 in (0.84 m)	9 ft 3 in (2.82 m)	19 reps	6
All values from NFL Combine/Pro Day

Clay went undrafted in the 2011 NFL draft.

Clay was signed by the Pittsburgh Steelers as an undrafted free agent on July 26, 2011. He waived for final cuts on September 2, 2011 but was re-signed two days later to the practice squad. On December 23, 2011, he was added to the team's active roster. He scored his first touchdown on his first carry in the NFL on December 24, 2011, a 10-yard score.

Clay was waived/injured on August 14, 2012, but subsequently reverted to injured reserve on August 16. He was given an injury settlement and released from injured reserve on August 20.
