= 2018 Iowa Hawkeyes football team =

American college football season

2018 Iowa Hawkeyes football

Outback Bowl champion

Outback Bowl, W 27–22 vs. Mississippi State
- Conference: Big Ten Conference
- West Division

Ranking
- AP: No. 25
- Record: 9–4 (5–4 Big Ten)
- Head coach: Kirk Ferentz (20th season)
- Offensive coordinator: Brian Ferentz (2nd season)
- Offensive scheme: Multiple
- Defensive coordinator: Phil Parker (7th season)
- Base defense: 4–3
- Captains: Jake Gervase; Parker Hesse; Keegan Render; Nate Stanley
- Home stadium: Kinnick Stadium

2018 Big Ten Conference football standings
	Conf.			Overall
Team	W		L	W		L
East Division
No. 3 Ohio State xy$	8	–	1	13	–	1
No. 14 Michigan x	8	–	1	10	–	3
No. 17 Penn State	6	–	3	9	–	4
Michigan State	5	–	4	7	–	6
Maryland	3	–	6	5	–	7
Indiana	2	–	7	5	–	7
Rutgers	0	–	9	1	–	11
West Division
No. 21 Northwestern xy	8	–	1	9	–	5
Wisconsin	5	–	4	8	–	5
No. 25 Iowa	5	–	4	9	–	4
Purdue	5	–	4	6	–	7
Minnesota	3	–	6	7	–	6
Nebraska	3	–	6	4	–	8
Illinois	2	–	7	4	–	8
Championship: Ohio State 45, Northwestern 24
$ – Conference champion; x – Division champion/co-champions; y – Championship game participant; Rankings from AP Poll

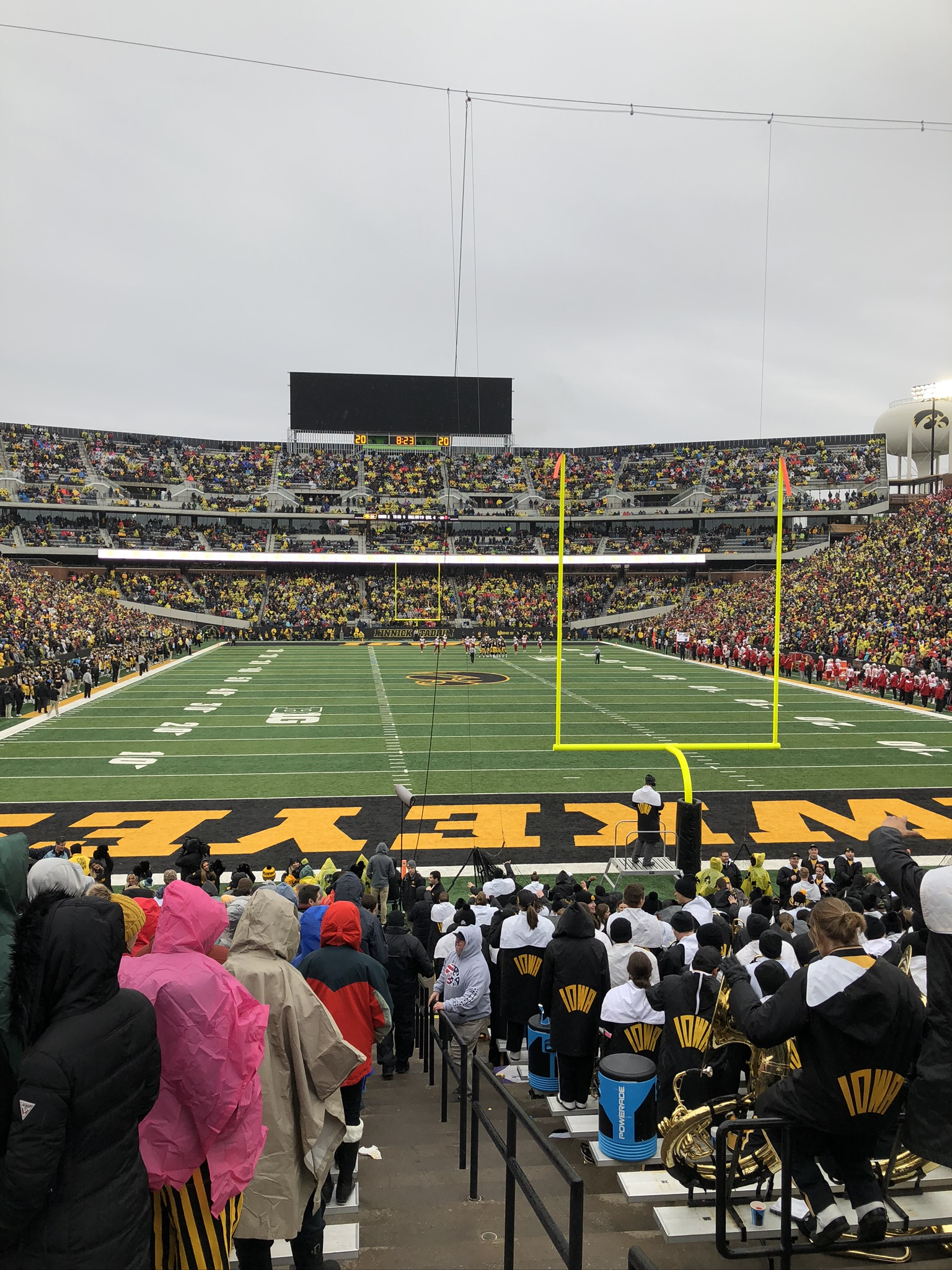
The Iowa Hawkeyes playing the Nebraska Cornhuskers in Kinnick Stadium in Iowa City, on November 23, 2018.

The 2018 Iowa Hawkeyes football team represented the University of Iowa during the 2018 NCAA Division I FBS football season. The Hawkeyes played their home games at Kinnick Stadium in Iowa City, Iowa and competed in the West Division of the Big Ten Conference. They were led by Kirk Ferentz in his 20th season as head coach.

Iowa began the year with six wins in their first seven games, with their sole loss during that span coming in their conference opener against Wisconsin. The Hawkeyes rose to 18th in the AP Poll, but lost three consecutive games to knock them from the polls. They ended the regular season with two more wins to finish tied for second in the West Division with a conference record of 5–4. They were invited to the 2019 Outback Bowl, where they defeated Mississippi State. Iowa finished with a record of 9–4 and were ranked 25th in the final AP Poll, their first ranked finish and highest win total since 2015.

Quarterback Nate Stanley led the team in passing with 2,852 yards and 26 touchdowns, good for second in the Big Ten Conference in the latter category. The Hawkeyes featured two standout tight ends, with Noah Fant and T. J. Hockenson both earning first-team all-conference honors. Hockenson was awarded the John Mackey Award as the nation's top tight end. Iowa became the first school to have two tight ends chosen in the first round of an NFL Draft when Hockenson and Fant were both selected in the first 20 picks of the 2019 NFL draft. Defensive end A. J. Epenesa led the Big Ten in both sacks and forced fumbles. He was joined on the all-conference first-team by safety Amani Hooker, who was named the Big Ten's Defensive Back of the Year.

== Offseason ==
=== Recruiting ===
==== Position key ====
Back	B	Center	C	Cornerback	CB	Defensive back	DB
Defensive end	DE	Defensive lineman	DL	Defensive tackle	DT	End	E
Fullback	FB	Guard	G	Halfback	HB	Kicker	K
Kickoff returner	KR	Offensive tackle	OT	Offensive lineman	OL	Linebacker	LB
Long snapper	LS	Punter	P	Punt returner	PR	Quarterback	QB
Running back	RB	Safety	S	Tight end	TE	Wide receiver	WR

==== 2018 commitments ====
The Hawkeyes signed a total of 23 recruits.

College recruiting (2018)
Name	Hometown	School	Height	Weight	Commit date
Seth Benson; LB	Sioux Falls, SD	Washington High School	6 ft 1 in (1.85 m)	210 lb (95 kg)	Dec 21, 2017
Seth Benson; LB	Recruit ratings: Scout: Rivals: 247Sports: ESPN:				
JuJu Brents; S	Indianapolis, IN	Warren Central High School	6 ft 2 in (1.88 m)	179 lb (81 kg)	Sep 1, 2017
JuJu Brents; S	Recruit ratings: Scout: Rivals: 247Sports: ESPN:				
Dallas Creddieth; S	Florissant, MO	Hazelwood Central High School	6 ft 1 in (1.85 m)	189 lb (86 kg)	Dec 20, 2017
Dallas Creddieth; S	Recruit ratings: Scout: Rivals: 247Sports: ESPN:				
Dillon Doyle; LB	Iowa City, IA	Iowa City West High School	6 ft 3 in (1.91 m)	215 lb (98 kg)	Mar 20, 2017
Dillon Doyle; LB	Recruit ratings: Scout: Rivals: 247Sports: ESPN:				
Samson Evans; B	Crystal Lake, IL	Prairie Ridge High School	6 ft 0 in (1.83 m)	200 lb (91 kg)	May 21, 2017
Samson Evans; B	Recruit ratings: Scout: Rivals: 247Sports: ESPN:				
Henry Geil; RB	Green Bay, WI	Preble High School	6 ft 1 in (1.85 m)	203 lb (92 kg)	Apr 23, 2017
Henry Geil; RB	Recruit ratings: Scout: Rivals: 247Sports: ESPN:				
Cody Ince; OT	Balsam Lake, WI	Unity High School	6 ft 5 in (1.96 m)	260 lb (120 kg)	Jun 19, 2017
Cody Ince; OT	Recruit ratings: Scout: Rivals: 247Sports: ESPN:				
Jeff Jenkins; OG	Crystal Lake, IL	Prairie Ridge High School	6 ft 4 in (1.93 m)	269 lb (122 kg)	Jan 22, 2017
Jeff Jenkins; OG	Recruit ratings: Scout: Rivals: 247Sports: ESPN:				
D.J. Johnson; CB	Indianapolis, IN	North Central High School	6 ft 0 in (1.83 m)	170 lb (77 kg)	Aug 22, 2017
D.J. Johnson; CB	Recruit ratings: Scout: Rivals: 247Sports: ESPN:				
Logan Klemp; B	Jewell, IA	South Hamilton High School	6 ft 3 in (1.91 m)	210 lb (95 kg)	Feb 2, 2018
Logan Klemp; B	Recruit ratings: Scout: Rivals: 247Sports: ESPN:				
Tyler Linderbaum; DT	Solon, IA	Solon High School	6 ft 2 in (1.88 m)	262 lb (119 kg)	May 1, 2017
Tyler Linderbaum; DT	Recruit ratings: Scout: Rivals: 247Sports: ESPN:				
Calvin Lockett; WR	Largo, FL	Largo High School	6 ft 2 in (1.88 m)	160 lb (73 kg)	Dec 13, 2017
Calvin Lockett; WR	Recruit ratings: Scout: Rivals: 247Sports: ESPN:				
Jayden McDonald; LB	Suwanee, GA	North Gwinnett High School	6 ft 1 in (1.85 m)	217 lb (98 kg)	Feb 5, 2018
Jayden McDonald; LB	Recruit ratings: Scout: Rivals: 247Sports: ESPN:				
Kaevon Merriweather; S	Belleville, MI	Belleville High School	6 ft 2 in (1.88 m)	195 lb (88 kg)	Feb 2, 2018
Kaevon Merriweather; S	Recruit ratings: Scout: Rivals: 247Sports: ESPN:				
Riley Moss; S	Ankeny, IA	Ankeny Centennial High School	6 ft 1 in (1.85 m)	179 lb (81 kg)	Dec 20, 2017
Riley Moss; S	Recruit ratings: Scout: Rivals: 247Sports: ESPN:				
Daviyon Nixon; DT	Kenosha, WI	Iowa Western Community College	6 ft 3 in (1.91 m)	289 lb (131 kg)	Feb 2, 2017
Daviyon Nixon; DT	Recruit ratings: Scout: Rivals: 247Sports: ESPN:				
Spencer Petras; QB	Kentfield, CA	Marin Catholic High School	6 ft 5 in (1.96 m)	207 lb (94 kg)	Dec 15, 2017
Spencer Petras; QB	Recruit ratings: Scout: Rivals: 247Sports: ESPN:				
Jack Plumb; OT	Green Bay, WI	Bay Port High School	6 ft 8 in (2.03 m)	240 lb (110 kg)	Jul 26, 2017
Jack Plumb; OT	Recruit ratings: Scout: Rivals: 247Sports: ESPN:				
Nico Ragaini; B	Avon, CT	Avon High School	6 ft 0 in (1.83 m)	190 lb (86 kg)	Jan 8, 2018
Nico Ragaini; B	Recruit ratings: Scout: Rivals: 247Sports: ESPN:				
Terry Roberts; CB	Erie, PA	Cathedral Prep High School	5 ft 10 in (1.78 m)	169 lb (77 kg)	Jun 6, 2017
Terry Roberts; CB	Recruit ratings: Scout: Rivals: 247Sports: ESPN:				
Noah Shannon; DT	Oswego, IL	Oswego High School	6 ft 1 in (1.85 m)	305 lb (138 kg)	Jul 4, 2017
Noah Shannon; DT	Recruit ratings: Scout: Rivals: 247Sports: ESPN:				
Tyrone Tracy Jr. RB	Indianapolis, IN	Decatur Central High School	6 ft 0 in (1.83 m)	185 lb (84 kg)	Apr 29, 2017
Tyrone Tracy Jr. RB	Recruit ratings: Scout: Rivals: 247Sports: ESPN:				
John Waggoner; DE	West Des Moines	Dowling Catholic High School	6 ft 5 in (1.96 m)	240 lb (110 kg)	Dec 5, 2017
John Waggoner; DE	Recruit ratings: Scout: Rivals: 247Sports: ESPN:				
Overall recruit ranking:
Note: In many cases, Scout, Rivals, 247Sports, On3, and ESPN may conflict in their listings of height and weight.; In these cases, the average was taken. ESPN grades are on a 100-point scale.; Sources: "Iowa Football Commitments". Rivals.; "2018 Iowa Football Commits". Scout.; "ESPN". ESPN.; "Scout.com Team Recruiting Rankings". Scout.; "2018 Team Ranking". Rivals.com.

== Preseason ==
=== Award watch lists ===
Award	Player	Position	Year
Lott Trophy	Anthony Nelson	DE	JR
Chuck Bednarik Award	Anthony Nelson	DE	JR
Rimington Trophy	Keegan Render	C	SR
Maxwell Award	Nate Stanley	QB	JR
John Mackey Award	Noah Fant	TE	JR
John Mackey Award	T. J. Hockenson	TE	SO
Bronko Nagurski Trophy	Anthony Nelson	DE	JR
Walter Camp Award	Noah Fant	TE	JR
Ted Hendricks Award	Anthony Nelson	DE	JR
Manning Award	Nate Stanley	QB	JR

== Schedule ==
Date	Time	Opponent	Rank	Site	TV	Result	Attendance
September 1	2:30 p.m.	Northern Illinois*		Kinnick Stadium; Iowa City, IA	BTN	W 33–7	67,510
September 8	4:00 p.m.	Iowa State*		Kinnick Stadium; Iowa City, IA (Cy-Hawk Trophy)	FOX	W 13–3	69,250
September 15	6:30 p.m.	No. 21 (FCS) Northern Iowa*		Kinnick Stadium; Iowa City, IA	BTN	W 38–14	69,250
September 22	7:30 p.m.	No. 18 Wisconsin		Kinnick Stadium; Iowa City, IA (Heartland Trophy)	FOX	L 17–28	69,250
October 6	2:30 p.m.	at Minnesota		TCF Bank Stadium; Minneapolis, MN (Floyd of Rosedale)	BTN	W 48–31	48,199
October 13	11:00 a.m.	at Indiana		Memorial Stadium; Bloomington, IN	ESPN2	W 42–16	40,512
October 20	11:00 a.m.	Maryland^{†}	No. 19	Kinnick Stadium; Iowa City, IA	ESPN2	W 23–0	69,250
October 27	2:30 p.m.	at No. 17 Penn State	No. 18	Beaver Stadium; University Park, PA	ESPN	L 24–30	105,244
November 3	2:30 p.m.	at Purdue	No. 16	Ross–Ade Stadium; West Lafayette, IN	ESPN2	L 36–38	60,716
November 10	2:30 p.m.	Northwestern	No. 21	Kinnick Stadium; Iowa City, IA	FOX	L 10–14	66,493
November 17	2:30 p.m.	at Illinois		Memorial Stadium; Champaign, IL	BTN	W 63–0	33,313
November 23	11:00 a.m.	Nebraska		Kinnick Stadium; Iowa City, IA (Heroes Trophy)	FOX	W 31–28	65,299
January 1	11:00 a.m.	vs. No. 18 Mississippi State*		Raymond James Stadium; Tampa, FL (Outback Bowl)	ESPN2	W 27–22	40,518
*Non-conference game; ^{†}Homecoming; Rankings from AP Poll and CFP Rankings after October 30 released prior to game; All times are in Central time

== Roster ==
2018 Iowa Hawkeyes football team roster
Players
Coaches
Offense

Pos.	#	Name	Class
QB	2	Peyton Mansell	Fr
QB	7	Spencer Petras	Fr
QB	11	Connor Kapisak	Fr
QB	17	Ryan Schmidt	Jr
QB	4	Nate Stanley	Jr
RB	16	Kyshaun Bryan	Fr
RB	30	Henry Geil	Fr
RB	21	Ivory Kelly-Martin	So
RB	10	Mekhi Sargent	So
RB	8	Kordell Stillmunkes	Fr
RB	28	Toren Young	So
FB	46	Austin Kelly	Sr
FB	45	Joe Ludwig	Fr
FB	40	Turner Pallissard	Fr
FB	36	Brady Ross	Jr
WR	83	Blair Brooks	Fr
WR	19	Max Cooper	So
WR	23	Dominique Dafney	Jr
WR	84	Nick Easley	Sr
WR	22	Samson Evans	Fr
WR	14	Kyle Groeneweg	Sr
WR	82	Calvin Lockett	Fr
WR	13	Henry Marchese	Fr
WR	89	Nico Ragaini	Fr
WR	12	Brandon Smith	So
WR	6	Ihmir Smith-Marsette	So
WR	41	Drew Thomas	Fr
WR	3	Tyrone Tracy	Fr
TE	42	Shaun Beyer	So
TE	18	Drew Cook	Jr
TE	87	Noah Fant	Jr
TE	86	Noah Feldman	Fr
TE	38	T. J. Hockenson	So
TE	46	Tommy Kujawa	Fr
TE	48	Bryce Schulte	Fr
TE	81	Ben Subbert	Fr
TE	85	Nate Vejvoda	Jr
TE	39	Nate Wieting	Jr
OL	61	Cole Banwart	So
OL	67	Levi Duwa	Fr
OL	55	Luke Empen	Fr
OL	54	Matt Fagan	Fr
OL	76	Dalton Ferguson	Sr
OL	73	Cody Ince	Fr
OL	77	Alaric Jackson	So
OL	75	Jeff Jenkins	Fr
OL	71	Mark Kallenberger	Fr
OL	72	Coy Kirkpatrick	Fr
OL	58	Jake Newborg	Jr
OL	68	Landan Paulsen	Jr
OL	66	Levi Paulsen	Jr
OL	79	Jack Plumb	Fr
OL	69	Keegan Render	Sr
OL	59	Ross Reynolds	Sr
OL	56	Brian Sadler	Fr
OL	64	Kyler Schott	Fr
OL	70	Kyle Sorensen	Fr
OL	78	Trey Winters	Fr
OL	74	Tristan Wirfs	So

Defense

Pos.	#	Name	Class
DL	90	Sam Brincks	Sr
DL	94	A. J. Epenesa	So
DL	77	Daniel Gaffney	Sr
DL	57	Chauncey Golston	So
DL	40	Parker Hesse	Sr
DL	66	Dalles Jacobus	So
DL	53	Garret Jansen	Jr
DL	97	Jack Kallenberger	Jr
DL	95	Cedrick Lattimore	Jr
DL	65	Tyler Linderbaum	Fr
DL	60	Jake Morrison	Fr
DL	98	Anthony Nelson	Jr
DL	96	Matt Nelson	Sr
DL	59	Nathan Nelson	Fr
DL	54	Daviyon Nixon	So
DL	91	Brady Reiff	Jr
DL	74	Austin Schulte	So
DL	99	Noah Shannon	Fr
DL	93	Brandon Simon	So
DL	92	John Waggoner	Fr
LB	47	Nick Anderson	Jr
LB	44	Seth Benson	Fr
LB	45	Ben Campos	Fr
LB	39	John Carlson	Fr
LB	32	Djimon Colbert	Fr
LB	43	Dillon Doyle	Fr
LB	13	Joe Evans	Fr
LB	48	Jack Hockaday	Sr
LB	52	Amani Jones	Jr
LB	46	Logan Klemp	Fr
LB	25	Jayden McDonald	Fr
LB	31	Aaron Mends	Sr
LB	49	Nick Niemann	So
LB	38	Monte Pottebaum	Fr
LB	36	Mitch Riggs	Fr
LB	19	Mike Timm	Fr
LB	35	Barrington Wade	So
LB	34	Kristian Welch	Jr
DB	20	JuJu Brents	Fr
DB	33	Riley Moss	Fr
DB	1	Wes Dvorak	Jr
DB	30	Jake Gervase	Sr
DB	8	Matt Hankins	So
DB	15	Dallas Craddieth	Fr
DB	3	Trey Creamer	Fr
DB	41	Colton Dinsdale	Jr
DB	27	Amani Hooker	Jr
DB	28	Jack Koerner	Fr
DB	16	Terry Roberts	Fr
DB	26	Kaevon Merriweather	Fr
DB	18	John Milani	Jr
DB	11	Michael Ojemudia	Jr
DB	12	D. J. Johnson	Fr
DB	9	Geno Stone	So
DB	4	Josh Turner	Fr
DB	17	Devonte Young	Jr

Special teams

Pos.	#	Name	Class
K	1	Keith Duncan	So
K	91	Miguel Recinos	Sr
K	94	Caleb Shudak	So
P	2	Ryan Gersonde	So
P	7	Colten Rastetter	Jr
LS	84	Austin Spiewak	So
LS	50	Jackson Subbert	Jr

Head coach

- Kirk Ferentz

Coordinators/assistant coaches

- Brian Ferentz – Offensive Coordinator/Tight Ends
- Phil Parker – Defensive Coordinator/Secondary
- LeVar Woods – Special Teams Coordinator
- Ken O'Keefe – Quarterbacks
- Derrick Foster – Running Backs
- Kelton Copeland – Wide Receivers
- Tim Polasek– Offensive Line
- Reese Morgan – Defensive Line
- Seth Wallace – Linebackers
- Chris Doyle – Strength and Conditioning
- Raimond Braithwaite – Assistant, Strength and Conditioning
- Cody Myers – Assistant, Strength and Conditioning
- Peter Remmes – Assistant, Strength and Conditioning
- Mark Weisman – Assistant, Strength and Conditioning
- Kelvin Bell – Recruiting Coordinator/Assistant Defensive Line
- Paul Federici – Director of Football Operations
- Ben Hansen – Assistant Director of Football Operations
- Broderick Binns – Director, Player Development
- Scott Southmayd – Director, Player Personnel
- Max Allen – Director, Football New Media
- Tyler Barnes – Director, Recruiting
- Martin Hopkins – Graduate Assistant
- Joe Pawlak – Graduate Assistant
- Josh Sinagoga – Graduate Assistant
- Shane Viilo – Graduate Assistant
- Tyler Parker – Football Analyst
- Austin Showalter – Football Analyst/Administrative Assistant
- Kevin Spencer – Football Analyst
- Bob Rahfeldt – Video Coordinator

Legend

- (C) Team captain
- (S) Suspended
- (I) Ineligible
- Injured
- Redshirt

Roster
Last update: 8/25/18

== Rankings ==
Ranking movements Legend: ██ Increase in ranking ██ Decrease in ranking — = Not ranked RV = Received votes
	Week															
Poll	Pre	1	2	3	4	5	6	7	8	9	10	11	12	13	14	Final
AP	RV	RV	RV	RV	RV	RV	RV	19	18	19	RV	RV	RV	RV	RV	25
Coaches	RV	RV	RV	RV	RV	RV	RV	22	18	18	RV	—	RV	RV	RV	RV
CFP	Not released									16	21	—	—	—	—	Not released

== Game summaries ==
=== Northern Illinois ===
Northern Illinois at Iowa

Team	1	2	3	4	Total
Huskies	0	0	0	7	7
• Hawkeyes	0	3	14	16	33

- Date: September 1
- Location:
  Kinnick Stadium
  Iowa City, IA
- Game start: 2:40 p.m. CDT
- Elapsed time: 3:11
- Game attendance: 67,510
- Game weather: 80 °F (27 °C), Overcast, Wind SSW 5–10 mph (8.0–16.1 km/h)
- Referee: Jeff Servinski
- TV announcers (BTN): Joe Beninati, Chuck Long, and Ally Sturm
- Source: Box Score

Scoring summary
2	12:20	Iowa	Miguel Recinos 33-yard field goal	Iowa 3–0
3	7:20	Iowa	Noah Fant 1-yard pass from Nate Stanley (Miguel Recinos kick)	Iowa 10–0
3	2:41	Iowa	Ivory Kelly-Martin 2-yard run (Miguel Recinos kick)	Iowa 17–0
4	13:02	Iowa	Toren Young 6-yard run (Miguel Recinos kick)	Iowa 24–0
4	7:59	Iowa	Safety	Iowa 26–0
4	6:52	Iowa	Peyton Mansell 1-yard run (Miguel Recinos kick)	Iowa 33–0
4	2:12	NIU	Jauan Wesley 10-yard pass from Marcus Childers (Andrew Gantz kick)	Iowa 33–7

After a slow start, the Hawkeyes scored touchdowns on three straight possessions en route to a 30-point second half. The win was the 144th for head coach Kirk Ferentz, making him the all-time winningest coach in Iowa football history. After an opening drive 3 and out for the Hawkeyes, NIU blocked the punt and had the ball at the Iowa 20. However, a missed field goal swung momentum back to the home team. The only first half points came on a 33-yard field goal from Hawkeye kicker Miguel Recinos. After a slow 3rd quarter, Heisman hopeful Nate Stanley threw his first touchdown of the year, a 1-yard pitch-and-catch to tight end Noah Fant. On the ensuing drive, running back Ivory Kelly-Martin barreled in on a 3rd and goal play to make it 17–0 going into the 4th quarter. After another short field, Toren Young found pay dirt on a 6-yard effort, and it was 24–0 Iowa. After a great punt by Colton Rastetter, NIU got the ball inside their own 1 yard line. on 2nd down, the Hawkeyes forced a safety, and after getting the ball back off the safety punt, backup quarterback Peyton Mansell got his first career touchdown on a quarterback sneak. After Iowa put their 2nd team defense in, the Huskies marched down the field in an impressive 11 play, 75 yard drive to put some late points on the scoreboard. Iowa shook off the slow 1st half and routed NIU 33–7 inside of Kinnick Stadium during the annual Gold Game.

Statistics	NIU	IOWA
First downs	15	18
Total yards	211	352
Rushing yards	101	209
Passing yards	110	143
Turnovers	2	1
Time of possession	25:15	34:45

Team	Category	Player	Statistics
Northern Illinois	Passing	Marcus Childers	14/25, 105 yards, TD, INT
Northern Illinois	Rushing	Jordan Nettles	13 carries, 74 yards
Northern Illinois	Receiving	D. J. Brown	5 receptions, 38 yards
Iowa	Passing	Nate Stanley	11/23, 108 yards, TD, INT
Iowa	Rushing	Toren Young	8 carries, 84 yards, TD
Iowa	Receiving	T. J. Hockenson	4 receptions, 64 yards

=== Iowa State ===
Iowa State at Iowa
Cy-Hawk Trophy

Team	1	2	3	4	Total
Cyclones	3	0	0	0	3
• Hawkeyes	0	3	3	7	13

- Date: September 8
- Location:
  Kinnick Stadium
  Iowa City, IA
- Game start: 4:00 p.m. CDT
- Elapsed time: 3:12
- Game attendance: 69,250
- Game weather: 69 °F (21 °C), Partly Sunny, Wind 5–10 mph (8.0–16.1 km/h)
- Referee: Cooper Castleberry
- TV announcers (FOX): Tim Brando, Spencer Tillman, and Holly Sonders
- Source: Box Score

Scoring summary
1	6:42	ISU	C. Assalley 23-yard field goal	ISU 3–0
2	5:18	Iowa	Miguel Recinos 31-yard field goal	Tied 3–3
3	6:34	Iowa	Miguel Recinos 48-yard field goal	Iowa 6–3
4	4:47	Iowa	Mekhi Sargent 2-yard run (Miguel Recinos kick)	Iowa 13–3

Neither offense could get going in this in-state rivalry contest. Iowa was the only team to find the endzone and with only a few minutes left in the fourth quarter. An A. J. Epenesa strip-sack sealed this low-scoring affair to keep the Cy-Hawk trophy in Iowa City for a fourth straight year.

Statistics	ISU	IOWA
First downs	11	14
Total yards	188	271
Rushing yards	19	105
Passing yards	169	166
Turnovers	1	0
Time of possession	28:25	31:35

Team	Category	Player	Statistics
Iowa State	Passing	Kyle Kempt	15/21, 126 yards
Iowa State	Rushing	David Montgomery	17 carries, 44 yards
Iowa State	Receiving	Hakeem Butler	3 receptions, 35 yards
Iowa	Passing	Nate Stanley	16/28, 166 yards
Iowa	Rushing	Toren Young	21 carries, 68 yards
Iowa	Receiving	T. J. Hockenson	6 receptions, 33 yards

=== Northern Iowa ===
Northern Iowa at Iowa

Team	1	2	3	4	Total
No. 21 (FCS) Panthers	0	0	0	14	14
• Hawkeyes	7	14	17	0	38

- Date: September 15
- Location:
  Kinnick Stadium
  Iowa City, IA
- Game start: 6:30 p.m. CDT
- Elapsed time: 3:06
- Game attendance: 69,250
- Game weather: 84 °F (29 °C), Partly cloudy, Wind E 2 mph (3.2 km/h)
- Referee: Mark Kluczynski
- TV announcers (BTN): Chris Vosters, Chuck Long
- Source: Box Score

Scoring summary
1	6:07	Iowa	Noah Fant 5-yard pass from Nate Stanley (Miguel Recinos kick)	Iowa 7–0
2	14:09	Iowa	Mekhi Sargent 2-yard run (Miguel Recinos kick)	Iowa 14–0
2	2:09	Iowa	Mekhi Sargent 10-yard run (Miguel Recinos kick)	Iowa 21–0
3	9:50	Iowa	Miguel Recinos 42-yard field goal	Iowa 24–0
3	7:03	Iowa	Nick Easley 14-yard pass from Nate Stanley (Miguel Recinos kick)	Iowa 31–0
3	1:59	Iowa	Toren Young 15-yard run (Miguel Recinos kick)	Iowa 38–0
4	11:12	UNI	B. Moore 4-yard pass from E. Dunne (A. Errthum kick)	Iowa 38–7
4	5:25	UNI	E. Nissen 5-yard pass from E. Dunne (A. Errthum kick)	Iowa 38–14

The Panthers were able to play with the Hawkeyes for a while but Iowa's depth proved to be ultimately overwhelming for FCS opponent Northern Iowa. Iowa ended the game with nearly 550 yards of total offense and the final score wasn't indicative of how one-sided this match-up was as the Hawkeyes played their second string for most of the fourth quarter. Iowa's defense had a relentless effort holding Northern Iowa to minus-2 rushing yards in the first half.

Statistics	UNI	IOWA
First downs	14	27
Total yards	228	545
Rushing yards	6	207
Passing yards	222	338
Turnovers	2	2
Time of possession	23:26	36:34

Team	Category	Player	Statistics
Northern Iowa	Passing	Eli Dunne	18/28, 200 yards, 2 TD
Northern Iowa	Rushing	Trevor Allen	13 carries, 27 yards
Northern Iowa	Receiving	Briley Moore	5 receptions, 32 yards, TD
Iowa	Passing	Nate Stanley	23/28, 309 yards, 2 TD, INT
Iowa	Rushing	Toren Young	14 carries, 82 yards, TD
Iowa	Receiving	Nick Easley	10 receptions, 103 yards, TD

=== No. 18 Wisconsin ===
No. 18 Wisconsin at Iowa
Heartland Trophy

Team	1	2	3	4	Total
• No. 18 Badgers	0	7	7	14	28
Hawkeyes	0	7	10	0	17

- Date: September 22
- Location:
  Kinnick Stadium
  Iowa City, IA
- Game start: 7:35 p.m. CDT
- Elapsed time: 3:15
- Game attendance: 69,250
- Game weather: 65 °F (18 °C), Clear, Wind ESE 6 mph (9.7 km/h)
- Referee: Mike Cannon
- TV announcers (FOX): Gus Johnson, Joel Klatt, Jenny Taft
- Source: Box Score

Scoring summary
2	14:31	Wis	Jake Ferguson 6-yard pass from Alex Hornibrook (Rafael Gaglianone kick)	Wis 7–0
2	5:15	Iowa	Noah Fant 20-yard pass from Nate Stanley (Miguel Recinos kick)	Tied 7–7
3	10:12	Iowa	Miguel Recinos 24-yard field goal	Iowa 10–7
3	5:12	Wis	Danny Davis 12-yard pass from Alex Hornibrook (Rafael Gaglianone kick)	Wis 14–10
3	1:37	Iowa	Noah Fant 1-yard pass from Nate Stanley (Miguel Recinos kick)	Iowa 17–14
4	0:57	Wis	A. J. Taylor 17-yard pass from Alex Hornibrook (Rafael Gaglianone kick)	Wis 21–17
4	0:22	Wis	Alec Ingold 33-yard run (Rafael Gaglianone kick)	Wis 28–17

Statistics	WIS	IOWA
First downs	19	19
Total yards	415	404
Rushing yards	210	148
Passing yards	205	256
Turnovers	0	3
Time of possession	35:13	24:47

Team	Category	Player	Statistics
Wisconsin	Passing	Alex Hornibrook	17/22, 205 yards, 3 TD
Wisconsin	Rushing	Jonathan Taylor	25 carries, 113 yards
Wisconsin	Receiving	Jake Ferguson	4 receptions, 58 yards, TD
Iowa	Passing	Nate Stanley	14/23, 256 yards, 2 TD, INT
Iowa	Rushing	Ivory Kelly-Martin	14 carries, 72 yards
Iowa	Receiving	T. J. Hockenson	3 receptions, 125 yards

=== At Minnesota ===
Iowa at Minnesota
Floyd of Rosedale

Team	1	2	3	4	Total
• Hawkeyes	14	14	10	10	48
Golden Gophers	7	10	7	7	31

- Date: October 6
- Location:
  TCF Bank Stadium
  Minneapolis, MN
- Game start: 2:40 p.m. CDT
- Elapsed time: 3:30
- Game attendance: 48,199
- Game weather: 45 °F (7 °C), Cloudy, Wind NNW 9 mph (14 km/h)
- Referee: John O'Neill
- TV announcers (BTN): Brandon Gaudin, Glen Mason, Elise Menaker
- Source: Box Score

Scoring summary
1	8:49	Iowa	T. J. Hockenson 3-yard pass from Nate Stanley (Miguel Recinos kick)	Iowa 7–0
1	5:48	Iowa	Ihmir Smith-Marsette 60-yard pass from Nate Stanley (Miguel Recinos kick)	Iowa 14–0
1	0:58	Minn	Rashod Bateman 3-yard pass from Zack Annexstad (Carpenter kick)	Iowa 14–7
2	5:57	Iowa	T. J. Hockenson 4-yard run (Miguel Recinos kick)	Iowa 21–7
2	4:00	Minn	Emmitt Carpenter 49-yard field goal	Iowa 21–10
2	1:35	Iowa	Nick Easley 21-yard pass from Nate Stanley (Miguel Recinos kick)	Iowa 28–10
2	0:53	Minn	Tyler Johnson 6-yard pass from Zack Annexstad (Emmitt Carpenter kick)	Iowa 28–17
3	11:41	Iowa	Miguel Recinos 40-yard field goal	Iowa 31–17
3	7:36	Minn	Seth Green 1-yard run (Carpenter kick)	Iowa 31–24
3	4:03	Iowa	Noah Fant 5-yard pass from Nate Stanley (Miguel Recinos kick)	Iowa 38–24
4	9:20	Iowa	Miguel Recinos 20-yard field goal	Iowa 41–24
4	5:35	Minn	Rashod Bateman 7-yard pass from Zack Annexstad (Emmitt Carpenter kick)	Iowa 41–31
4	1:27	Iowa	Mekhi Sargent 2-yard run (Miguel Recinos kick)	Iowa 48–31

The Hawkeyes spoiled the Gophers' homecoming in this high-scoring rivalry game. A signature play of the game came on a fake field goal trick play in which T. J. Hockenson took a lateral pass in for a touchdown which helped Iowa secure a lead going into halftime. The play is called "Herky" and was a New Kirk era technique that had yet to be implemented. The Hawks prevailed to keep Floyd of Rosedale in Iowa City for a fourth year in a row.

Statistics	IOWA	MINN
First downs	18	20
Total yards	420	320
Rushing yards	106	86
Passing yards	314	234
Turnovers	2	4
Time of possession	33:17	26:43

Team	Category	Player	Statistics
Iowa	Passing	Nate Stanley	23/39, 314 yards, 4 TD, INT
Iowa	Rushing	Ivory Kelly-Martin	20 carries, 47 yards
Iowa	Receiving	Nick Easley	6 receptions, 52 yards, TD
Minnesota	Passing	Zack Annexstad	17/33, 218 yards, 3 TD, 3 INT
Minnesota	Rushing	Mohamed Ibrahim	13 carries, 62 yards
Minnesota	Receiving	Rashod Bateman	7 receptions, 65 yards, 2 TD

=== At Indiana ===
Iowa at Indiana

Team	1	2	3	4	Total
• Hawkeyes	14	7	14	7	42
Hoosiers	3	7	6	0	16

- Date: October 13
- Location:
  Memorial Stadium
  Bloomington, IN
- Game start: 12:00 p.m. EDT
- Elapsed time: 3:16
- Game attendance: 40,512
- Game weather: 43 °F (6 °C), Partly cloudy, Wind SE 3 mph (4.8 km/h)
- Referee: Jeff Servinski
- TV announcers (ESPN2): Beth Mowins, Anthony Becht, Rocky Boiman
- Source: Box Score

Scoring summary
1	10:32	Indiana	Logan Justus 29-yard field goal	Indiana 3–0
1	7:15	Iowa	T. J. Hockenson 9-yard pass from Nate Stanley (Miguel Recinos kick)	Iowa 7–3
1	1:21	Iowa	Noah Fant 28-yard pass from Nate Stanley (Miguel Recinos kick)	Iowa 14–3
2	12:17	Indiana	Ty Fryfogle 33-yard pass from Peyton Ramsey (Logan Justus kick)	Iowa 14–10
2	10:03	Iowa	Nick Easley 12-yard pass from Nate Stanley (Miguel Recinos kick)	Iowa 21–10
3	12:03	Iowa	Toren Young 11-yard pass from Nate Stanley (Miguel Recinos kick)	Iowa 28–10
3	9:19	Iowa	T. J. Hockenson 54-yard pass from Nate Stanley (Miguel Recinos kick)	Iowa 35–10
3	5:55	Indiana	Peyton Ramsey 12-yard run (Pass failed)	Iowa 35–16
4	9:23	Iowa	Austin Kelly 4-yard pass from Nate Stanley (Miguel Recinos kick)	Iowa 42–16

Nate Stanley became the third Iowa quarterback to throw six touchdown passes in a single game. Tight ends T. J. Hockenson and Noah Fant each had over 100 yards receiving, totaling eight receptions for 208 yards and three TD.

Statistics	IOWA	IU
First downs	26	22
Total yards	479	330
Rushing yards	159	67
Passing yards	320	263
Turnovers	1	2
Time of possession	33:10	26:50

Team	Category	Player	Statistics
Iowa	Passing	Nate Stanley	21/32, 320 yards, 6 TD, INT
Iowa	Rushing	Toren Young	19 carries, 96 yards
Iowa	Receiving	T. J. Hockenson	4 receptions, 107 yards, 2 TD
Indiana	Passing	Peyton Ramsey	31/42, 263 yards, TD, 2 INT
Indiana	Rushing	Stevie Scott	8 carries, 29 yards
Indiana	Receiving	Reese Taylor	6 receptions, 28 yards

=== Maryland ===
Maryland at No. 19 Iowa
Homecoming

Team	1	2	3	4	Total
Terrapins	0	0	0	0	0
• No. 19 Hawkeyes	3	10	10	0	23

- Date: October 20
- Location:
  Kinnick Stadium
  Iowa City, IA
- Game start: 11:01 a.m. CDT
- Elapsed time: 2:49
- Game attendance: 69,250
- Game weather: 48 °F (9 °C), Clear, Wind 22 mph (35 km/h)
- Referee: Dan Capron
- TV announcers (ESPN2): Mark Jones, Dusty Dvoracek, Molly McGrath
- Source: Box Score

Scoring summary
1	0:03	Iowa	Miguel Recinos 23-yard field goal	Iowa 3–0
2	9:03	Iowa	Miguel Recinos 25-yard field goal	Iowa 6–0
2	0:08	Iowa	Brandon Smith 10-yard pass from Nate Stanley (Miguel Recinos kick)	Iowa 13–0
3	7:37	Iowa	Miguel Recinos 36-yard field goal	Iowa 16–0
3	3:31	Iowa	Anthony Nelson fumble recovery in end zone (Miguel Recinos kick)	Iowa 23–0

Iowa held visitor Maryland to just 115 yards of total offense in this shutout homecoming victory. Iowa did struggle to find the end zone but three Miguel Recinos field goals kept Iowa in the driver's seat for most of the way.

Statistics	UMD	IOWA
First downs	7	22
Total yards	115	310
Rushing yards	68	224
Passing yards	47	86
Turnovers	2	1
Time of possession	19:05	40:55

Team	Category	Player	Statistics
Maryland	Passing	Kasim Hill	6/15, 47 yards, INT
Maryland	Rushing	Javon Leake	1 carry, 16 yards
Maryland	Receiving	Ty Johnson	2 receptions, 2 yards
Iowa	Passing	Nate Stanley	11/22, 86 yards, TD, INT
Iowa	Rushing	Ivory Kelly-Martin	24 carries, 98 yards
Iowa	Receiving	T. J. Hockenson	3 receptions, 30 yards

=== At No. 17 Penn State ===
No. 18 Iowa at No. 17 Penn State

Team	1	2	3	4	Total
No. 18 Hawkeyes	12	5	0	7	24
• No. 17 Nittany Lions	7	10	10	3	30

- Date: October 27
- Location:
  Beaver Stadium
  University Park, PA
- Game start: 3:30 p.m. EDT
- Elapsed time: 3:42
- Game attendance: 105,244
- Game weather: 41 °F (5 °C), Cloudy and rain, Wind N 10 mph (16 km/h)
- Referee: Larry Smith
- TV announcers (ESPN): Steve Levy, Brian Griese, Todd McShay
- Source: Box Score

Scoring summary
1	14:08	Iowa	Blake Gillikin punt blocked by Dominique Dafney for a SAFETY	Iowa 2–0
1	10:09	Iowa	Miguel Recinos 27-yard field goal	Iowa 5–0
1	5:22	Iowa	Sam Brincks 10-yard pass from Colten Rastetter (Miguel Recinos kick)	Iowa 12–0
1	0:27	PSU	Pat Freiermuth 18-yard pass from Trace McSorley (J. Pinegar kick)	Iowa 12–7
2	13:39	Iowa	Snap out of the end zone for a SAFETY	Iowa 14–7
2	6:45	PSU	Tommy Stevens 3-yard run (Jake Pinegar kick)	Tied 14–14
2	4:32	Iowa	Miguel Recinos 49-yard field goal	Iowa 17–14
2	0:03	PSU	Jake Pinegar 45-yard field goal	Tied 17–17
3	12:10	PSU	Trace McSorley 51-yard run (Jake Pinegar kick)	PSU 24–17
3	4:10	PSU	Jake Pinegar 49-yard field goal	PSU 27–17
4	10:00	Iowa	Geno Stone 24-yard interception return (Miguel Recinos kick)	PSU 27–24
4	8:24	PSU	Jake Pinegar 44-yard field goal	PSU 30–24

Iowa went up 12–0 early and scored their first 14 points of the game on special teams plays (two safeties, a TD pass on a fake field goal and point after, and a Miguel Recinos field goal). After trailing 14–7, Penn State scored 20 of the next 23 points to lead 27–17. A pick six from Pennsylvania native Geno Stone brought the Hawks to within 27–24 with 10 minutes remaining, but a bad interception on a first and goal from the 3-yard line with just over 3 minutes remaining doomed Iowa's hopes of a road victory.

Statistics	IOWA	PSU
First downs	23	16
Total yards	350	312
Rushing yards	135	118
Passing yards	215	194
Turnovers	2	1
Time of possession	35:18	24:42

Team	Category	Player	Statistics
Iowa	Passing	Nate Stanley	18/49, 205 yards, 2 INT
Iowa	Rushing	Mekhi Sargent	16 carries, 91 yards
Iowa	Receiving	Noah Fant	5 receptions, 56 yards
Penn State	Passing	Trace McSorley	11/25, 167 yards, TD, INT
Penn State	Rushing	Trace McSorley	12 carries, 63 yards, TD
Penn State	Receiving	K. J. Hamler	5 receptions, 96 yards

=== At Purdue ===
No. 19 Iowa at Purdue

Team	1	2	3	4	Total
No. 19 Hawkeyes	7	10	6	13	36
• Boilermakers	14	7	14	3	38

- Date: November 3
- Location:
  Ross–Ade Stadium
  West Lafayette, IN
- Game start: 3:35 p.m. EDT
- Elapsed time: 3:20
- Game attendance: 60,716
- Game weather: 53 °F (12 °C), Mostly sunny, Wind E 8 mph (13 km/h)
- Referee: Mike Cannon
- TV announcers (ESPN2): Jason Benetti, Kelly Stouffer, Olivia Dekker
- Source: Box Score

Scoring summary
1	11:56	Purdue	Isaac Zico 36-yard pass from David Blough (Spencer Evans kick)	Purdue 7–0
1	6:15	Iowa	Ivory Kelly-Martin 2-yard run (Miguel Recinos kick)	Tied 7–7
1	3:40	Purdue	Markell Jones 1-yard run (Spencer Evans kick)	Purdue 14–7
2	10:47	Iowa	Miguel Recinos 34-yard field goal	Purdue 14–10
2	6:27	Purdue	Terry Wright 41-yard pass from David Blough (Spencer Evans kick)	Purdue 21–10
2	0:17	Iowa	Nate Stanley 1-yard run (Miguel Recinos kick)	Purdue 21–17
3	12:11	Purdue	Terry Wright 82-yard pass from David Blough (Spencer Evans kick)	Purdue 28–17
3	9:33	Iowa	T. J. Hockenson 4-yard pass from Nate Stanley (pass failed)	Purdue 28–23
3	2:26	Purdue	Terry Wright 3-yard pass from David Blough (Spencer Evans kick)	Purdue 35–23
4	12:29	Iowa	Mekhi Sargent 1-yard run (Miguel Recinos kick)	Purdue 35–30
4	10:19	Iowa	Mekhi Sargent 1-yard run (pass failed)	Iowa 36–35
4	0:08	Purdue	Spencer Evans 25-yard field goal	Purdue 38–36

Statistics	IOWA	PUR
First downs	22	21
Total yards	393	434
Rushing yards	118	101
Passing yards	275	333
Turnovers	1	2
Time of possession	33:57	26:03

Team	Category	Player	Statistics
Iowa	Passing	Nate Stanley	21/32, 275 yards, TD
Iowa	Rushing	Toren Young	9 carries, 45 yards
Iowa	Receiving	T. J. Hockenson	4 receptions, 39 yards, TD
Purdue	Passing	David Blough	23/32, 333 yards, 4 TD, 2 INT
Purdue	Rushing	Markell Jones	14 carries, 40 yards, TD
Purdue	Receiving	Terry Wright	6 receptions, 146 yards, 3 TD

=== Northwestern ===
Northwestern at Iowa

Team	1	2	3	4	Total
• Wildcats	0	0	7	7	14
Hawkeyes	0	3	7	0	10

- Date: November 10
- Location:
  Kinnick Stadium
  Iowa City, IA
- Game start: 2:35 p.m. CST
- Elapsed time: 3:16
- Game attendance: 66,493
- Game weather: 27 °F (−3 °C), Overcast, Wind SSW 8 mph (13 km/h)
- Referee: Ron Snodgrass
- TV announcers (FOX): Joe Davis, Brady Quinn, Bruce Feldman
- Source: Box Score

Scoring summary
2	0:56	Iowa	Miguel Recinos 46-yard field goal	Iowa 3–0
3	9:19	NW	Isaiah Bowser 34-yard run (Collins kick)	NW 7–3
3	4:27	Iowa	Imir Smith-Marsette 28-yard pass from Nate Stanley (Miguel Recinos kick)	Iowa 10–7
4	9:27	NW	Ben Skowronek 32-yard pass from Clayton Thorson (Collins kick)	NW 14–10

Statistics	NW	IOWA
First downs	19	16
Total yards	306	333
Rushing yards	184	64
Passing yards	122	269
Turnovers	2	2
Time of possession	31:06	28:54

Team	Category	Player	Statistics
Northwestern	Passing	Clayton Thorson	15/30, 122 yards, TD, 2 INT
Northwestern	Rushing	Isaiah Bowser	31 carries, 165 yards, TD
Northwestern	Receiving	Cameron Green	5 receptions, 30 yards
Iowa	Passing	Nate Stanley	27/41, 269 yards, TD
Iowa	Rushing	Mekhi Sargent	10 carries, 27 yards
Iowa	Receiving	Nick Easley	8 receptions, 53 yards

=== At Illinois ===
Iowa at Illinois

Team	1	2	3	4	Total
• Hawkeyes	7	28	14	14	63
Fighting Illini	0	0	0	0	0

- Date: November 17
- Location:
  Memorial Stadium
  Champaign, IL
- Game start: 2:35 p.m. CDT
- Elapsed time: 3:25
- Game attendance: 33,313
- Game weather: 38 °F (3 °C), Overcast, Wind NE 10 mph (16 km/h)
- Referee: Larry Smith
- TV announcers (BTN): Lisa Byington, J Leman
- Source: Box Score

Scoring summary
1	6:20	Iowa	Noah Fant 9-yard pass from Nate Stanley (Miguel Recinos kick)	Iowa 7–0
2	13:50	Iowa	Mekhi Sargent 3-yard run (Miguel Recinos kick)	Iowa 14–0
2	13:42	Iowa	A. J. Epenesa 19-yard fumble return (Miguel Recinos kick)	Iowa 21–0
2	11:43	Iowa	T. J. Hockenson 11-yard pass from Nate Stanley (Miguel Recinos kick)	Iowa 28–0
2	5:10	Iowa	T. J. Hockenson 37-yard pass from Nate Stanley (Miguel Recinos kick)	Iowa 35–0
3	13:26	Iowa	Kyle Groeneweg 61-yard punt return (Miguel Recinos kick)	Iowa 42–0
3	8:11	Iowa	Toren Young 5-yard run (Miguel Recinos kick)	Iowa 49–0
4	11:10	Iowa	Mekhi Sargent 29-yard run (Miguel Recinos kick)	Iowa 56–0
4	5:47	Iowa	Toren Young 14-yard run (Caleb Shudak kick)	Iowa 63–0

Kirk Ferentz recorded his 150th win at Iowa, the 5th head coach in Big Ten history to reach the mark, in this blowout victory over Illinois. After a sluggish start in the first quarter, Iowa dominated in every phase of the game the rest of the way. Not only scoring on offense but on defense and special teams as well.

Statistics	IOWA	ILL
First downs	20	11
Total yards	400	216
Rushing yards	203	134
Passing yards	197	82
Turnovers	1	4
Time of possession	28:43	31:17

Team	Category	Player	Statistics
Iowa	Passing	Nate Stanley	13/21, 178 yards, 3 TD, INT
Iowa	Rushing	Mekhi Sargent	17 carries, 121 yards, 2 TD
Iowa	Receiving	Noah Fant	3 receptions, 54 yards, TD
Illinois	Passing	AJ Bush	12/28, 82 yards, 2 INT
Illinois	Rushing	RaVon Bonner	21 carries, 96 yards
Illinois	Receiving	Ricky Smalling	3 receptions, 27 yards

=== Nebraska ===
Nebraska at Iowa
Heroes Trophy

Team	1	2	3	4	Total
Cornhuskers	7	6	0	15	28
• Hawkeyes	7	14	7	3	31

- Date: November 23
- Location:
  Kinnick Stadium
  Iowa City, IA
- Game start: 11:05 a.m. CST
- Elapsed time: 3:13
- Game attendance: 65,299
- Game weather: 44 °F (7 °C), Overcast, Wind SSE 7–15 mph (11–24 km/h)
- Referee: John O'Neill
- TV announcers (FOX): Brian Custer, Ben Leber, Jen Hale
- Source: Box Score

Scoring summary
1	9:37	Iowa	Brandon Smith 15-yard pass from Nate Stanley (Miguel Recinos kick)	Iowa 7–0
1	5:55	Neb	Jack Stoll 4-yard pass from Adrian Martinez (Barrett Pickering kick)	Tied 7–7
2	14:21	Iowa	Toren Young 4-yard run (Miguel Recinos kick)	Iowa 14–7
2	11:30	Neb	Barrett Pickering 27-yard field goal	Iowa 14–10
2	0:45	Iowa	Mekhi Sargent 15-yard run (Miguel Recinos kick)	Iowa 21–10
2	0:00	Iowa	Barrett Pickering 46-yard field goal	Iowa 21–13
3	9:13	Iowa	Mekhi Sargent 5-yard pass from Nate Stanley (Miguel Recinos kick)	Iowa 28–13
4	13:57	Neb	Maurice Washington 28-yard pass from Adrian Martinez (Barrett Pickering kick)	Iowa 28–20
4	3:22	Neb	Adrian Martinez 3-yard run (Martinez pass to Kade Warner)	Tied 28–28
4	0:00	Iowa	Miguel Recinos 41-yard field goal	Iowa 31–28

Iowa led the whole way until the final minutes of this nail-biting victory. Nebraska never backed down and tied the game up with 3:22 to play. Miguel Recinos kicked a game-winning field goal as time expired to keep the Heroes Trophy in Iowa City for the fourth year in a row.

Statistics	NEB	IOWA
First downs	24	25
Total yards	400	419
Rushing yards	140	266
Passing yards	260	153
Turnovers	1	0
Time of possession	25:19	34:41

Team	Category	Player	Statistics
Nebraska	Passing	Adrian Martinez	26/38, 260 yards, 2 TD, INT
Nebraska	Rushing	Adrian Martinez	17 carries, 76 yards, TD
Nebraska	Receiving	M. Washington	7 receptions, 102 yards, TD
Iowa	Passing	Nate Stanley	16/27, 152 yards, 2 TD
Iowa	Rushing	Mekhi Sargent	26 carries, 173 yards, TD
Iowa	Receiving	T. J. Hockenson	5 receptions, 54 yards

=== Vs. No. 18 Mississippi State (Outback Bowl) ===
No. 18 Mississippi State vs. Iowa
Outback Bowl

Team	1	2	3	4	Total
No. 18 Bulldogs	6	0	13	3	22
• Hawkeyes	0	17	7	3	27

- Date: January 1
- Location:
  Raymond James Stadium
  Tampa, FL
- Game start: 12:00 p.m. EST
- Elapsed time: 3:25
- Game attendance: 40,518
- Referee: Chris Coyte
- TV announcers (ESPN2): Mark Jones, Dusty Dvoracek, and Molly McGrath
- Source: Box Score

Scoring summary
1	6:37	MSU	Jace Christmann 44-yard field goal	MSU 3–0
1	0:45	MSU	Jace Christmann 42-yard field goal	MSU 6–0
2	10:02	Iowa	Miguel Recinos 44-yard field goal	MSU 6–3
2	7:55	Iowa	Nick Easley 75-yard pass from Nate Stanley (Miguel Recinos kick)	Iowa 10–6
2	6:18	Iowa	Ihmir Smith-Marsette 15-yard pass from Nate Stanley (Miguel Recinos kick)	Iowa 17–6
3	11:26	MSU	Kylin Hill 1-yard pass from Nick Fitzgerald (conversion failed)	Iowa 17–12
3	11:08	MSU	Nick Fitzgerald 33-yard run (Jace Christmann kick)	MSU 19–17
3	1:55	Iowa	Nick Easley 8-yard pass from Nate Stanley (Miguel Recinos kick)	Iowa 24–19
4	12:04	MSU	Jace Christmann 20-yard field goal	Iowa 24–22
4	5:51	Iowa	Miguel Recinos 40-yard field goal	Iowa 27–22

In a back-and-forth game, Iowa held on to defeat SEC opponent Mississippi State. Senior Jake Gervase made a critical interception in the end zone, and batted down a fourth down pass to end the Bulldogs' hopes. The victory was Ferentz's fifth January bowl win and eighth overall bowl victory.

Statistics	MS	IOWA
First downs	15	11
Total yards	342	199
Rushing yards	190	–15
Passing yards	152	214
Turnovers	3	2
Time of possession	33:34	26:26

Team	Category	Player	Statistics
Mississippi State	Passing	Nick Fitzgerald	14/32, 152 yards, TD, 2 INT
Mississippi State	Rushing	Nick Fitzgerald	20 carries, 103 yards, TD
Mississippi State	Receiving	Aeris Williams	3 receptions, 19 yards
Iowa	Passing	Nate Stanley	21/31, 214 yards, 3 TD, INT
Iowa	Rushing	Toren Young	3 carries, 7 yards
Iowa	Receiving	Nick Easley	8 receptions, 104 yards, 2 TD

== Awards and honors ==
Individual Awards
Player	Award	Ref.
T. J. Hockenson	John Mackey Award; Kwalick–Clark Tight End of the Year	
Amani Hooker	Tatum–Woodson Defensive Back of the Year	
Ihmir Smith-Marsette	Rodgers–Dwight Return Specialist of the Year	

All-Big Ten
Player	Position	Coaches	Media
Amani Hooker	DB	1	1
Noah Fant	TE	1	2
T. J. Hockenson	TE	2	1
A. J. Epenesa	DL	2	1
Ihmir Smith-Marsette	KR	2	1
Alaric Jackson	OT	2	2
Ross Reynolds	OG	2	3
Anthony Nelson	DL	3	2
Keegan Render	C	HM	3
Tristan Wirfs	OT	HM	HM
Jake Gervase	DB	HM	HM
Matt Nelson	DL	HM	HM
Miguel Recinos	K	HM	HM
Ihmir Smith-Marsette	WR	–	HM
Parker Hesse	DL	–	HM
Geno Stone	DB	–	HM
HM = Honorable mention. Reference:

== Players in the 2019 NFL draft ==
Player	Position	Round	Pick	NFL club	Ref
T. J. Hockenson	TE	1	8	Detroit Lions	
Noah Fant	TE	1	20	Denver Broncos	
Anthony Nelson	DE	4	107	Tampa Bay Buccaneers	
Amani Hooker	S	4	116	Tennessee Titans	
