= 2019 Iowa Hawkeyes football team =

American college football season

2019 Iowa Hawkeyes football

Holiday Bowl champion

Holiday Bowl, W 49–24 vs. USC
- Conference: Big Ten Conference
- West Division

Ranking
- Coaches: No. 15
- AP: No. 15
- Record: 10–3 (6–3 Big Ten)
- Head coach: Kirk Ferentz (21st season)
- Offensive coordinator: Brian Ferentz (3rd season)
- Offensive scheme: Multiple
- Defensive coordinator: Phil Parker (8th season)
- Base defense: 4–2–5
- Home stadium: Kinnick Stadium

Uniform
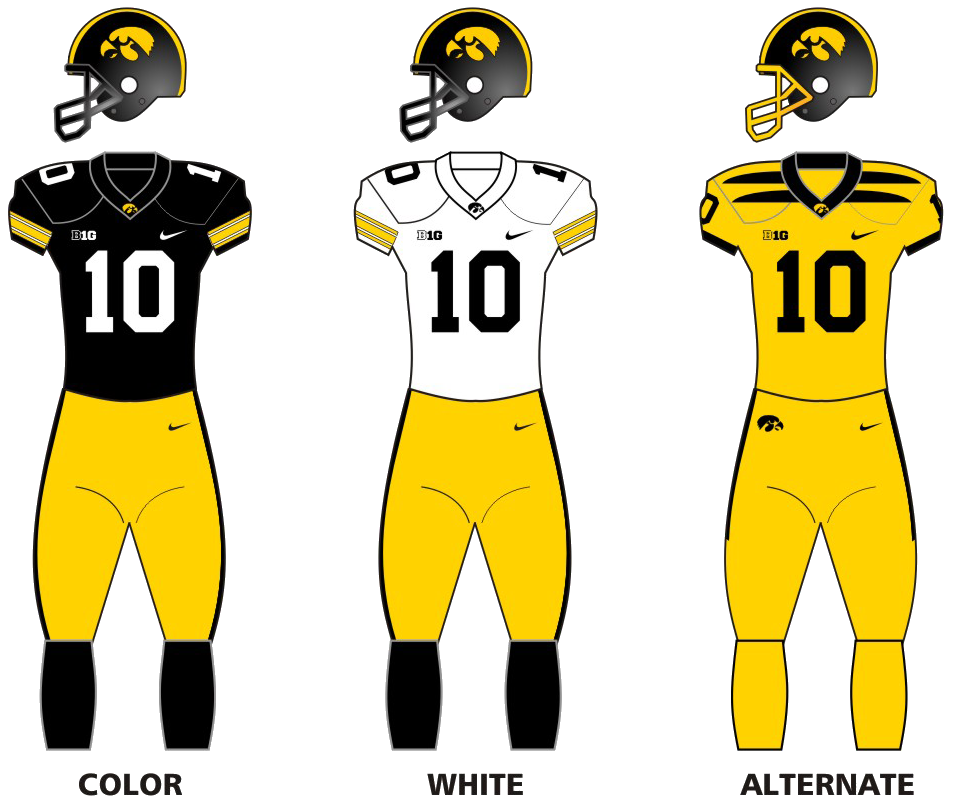

2019 Big Ten Conference football standings
	Conf.			Overall
Team	W		L	W		L
East Division
No. 3 Ohio State xy$^	9	–	0	13	–	1
No. 9 Penn State	7	–	2	11	–	2
No. 18 Michigan	6	–	3	9	–	4
Indiana	5	–	4	8	–	5
Michigan State	4	–	5	7	–	6
Maryland	1	–	8	3	–	9
Rutgers	0	–	9	2	–	10
West Division
No. 11 Wisconsin xy	7	–	2	10	–	4
No. 10 Minnesota x	7	–	2	11	–	2
No. 15 Iowa	6	–	3	10	–	3
Illinois	4	–	5	6	–	7
Purdue	3	–	6	4	–	8
Nebraska	3	–	6	5	–	7
Northwestern	1	–	8	3	–	9
Championship: Ohio State 34, Wisconsin 21
^ – College Football Playoff participant; $ – Conference champion; x – Division champion/co-champions; y – Championship game participant; Rankings from AP Poll

The 2019 Iowa Hawkeyes football team represented the University of Iowa during the 2019 NCAA Division I FBS football season. The Hawkeyes played their home games at Kinnick Stadium in Iowa City, Iowa, and competed in the West Division of the Big Ten Conference. They were led by Kirk Ferentz in his 21st season as head coach.

Iowa began the year with four straight wins, including an 18–17 road victory over rival Iowa State with College GameDay present. After losing games to three ranked opponents – at No. 19 Michigan (3–10), No. 10 Penn State (12–17), and at No. 13 Wisconsin (22–24) – by a total of 14 points, the Hawkeyes knocked off another rival, unbeaten No. 8 Minnesota, 23–19, to start a four-game win streak to close the season. After long-time athletic director Bump Elliott and head coach Hayden Fry died in December, Iowa capped the 2019 season with a resounding 49–24 win over No. 22 USC in the Holiday Bowl. The Hawkeyes finished with a record of 10–3 (6–3 B1G), the sixth season with 10+ wins in the Ferentz era.

Junior kicker Keith Duncan was named Big Ten Kicker of the Year and was selected as a consensus First-team All-American. Junior offensive tackle Tristan Wirfs was named Big Ten Offensive Lineman of the Year, and later became the 10th Iowa player of the Ferentz era taken in the first round of the NFL Draft. After leading the Big Ten in sacks his sophomore season, junior defensive end A. J. Epenesa had a career-high 11.5 sacks in 2019, and was selected in the second round of the 2020 NFL draft. Michael Ojemudia and Geno Stone became the fourth and fifth Iowa defensive backs drafted between 2017 and 2020. Nate Stanley, a three-year starter at quarterback, was also selected.

== Preseason ==
=== Award watch lists ===
Award	Player	Position	Year
Lott Trophy	A. J. Epenesa	DE	JR
Maxwell Award	Nate Stanley	QB	SR
Chuck Bednarik Award	A. J. Epenesa	DE	JR
Davey O'Brien Award	Nate Stanley	QB	SR
Doak Walker Award	Mekhi Sargent	RB	JR
John Mackey Award	Nate Wieting	TE	SR
Bronko Nagurski Trophy	A. J. Epenesa	DE	JR
Outland Trophy	Alaric Jackson	OT	JR
Outland Trophy	Tristan Wirfs	OT	JR
Paul Hornung Award	Ihmir Smith-Marsette	WR & RS	JR
Walter Camp Award	Nate Stanley	QB	SR

=== Preseason Big Ten poll ===
Although the Big Ten Conference has not held an official preseason poll since 2010, Cleveland.com has polled sports journalists representing all member schools as a de facto preseason media poll since 2011. For the 2019 poll, Iowa was projected to finish in second in the West Division behind Nebraska.

== Schedule ==
Iowa's 2019 schedule began with a non-conference home game against the Miami RedHawks of the Mid-American Conference. Iowa's Big Ten Conference opener was the second week against Rutgers. They finished off their non-conference slate with a road game against in-state rival Iowa State, a member of the Big 12 Conference, and then a home game against Middle Tennessee of Conference USA.

In Big Ten Conference play, Iowa played all members of the West Division and Rutgers, Michigan, and Penn State from the East Division.

Date	Time	Opponent	Rank	Site	TV	Result	Attendance
August 31	6:30 p.m.	Miami (OH)*	No. 20	Kinnick Stadium; Iowa City, IA	FS1	W 38–14	69,250
September 7	11:00 a.m.	Rutgers	No. 20	Kinnick Stadium; Iowa City, IA	FS1	W 30–0	61,808
September 14	3:00 p.m.	at Iowa State*	No. 19	Jack Trice Stadium; Ames, IA (Cy-Hawk Trophy / College GameDay)	FS1	W 18–17	61,500
September 28	11:00 a.m.	Middle Tennessee*	No. 14	Kinnick Stadium; Iowa City, IA	ESPN2	W 48–3	63,706
October 5	11:00 a.m.	at No. 19 Michigan	No. 14	Michigan Stadium; Ann Arbor, MI	FOX	L 3–10	111,519
October 12	6:30 p.m.	No. 10 Penn State	No. 17	Kinnick Stadium; Iowa City, IA	ABC	L 12–17	69,034
October 19	11:00 a.m.	Purdue^{†}	No. 23	Kinnick Stadium; Iowa City, IA	ESPN2	W 26–20	69,250
October 26	11:00 a.m.	at Northwestern	No. 20	Ryan Field; Evanston, IL	ESPN2	W 20–0	42,104
November 9	3:00 p.m.	at No. 13 Wisconsin	No. 18	Camp Randall Stadium; Madison, WI (Heartland Trophy)	FOX	L 22–24	78,018
November 16	3:00 p.m.	No. 8 Minnesota	No. 20	Kinnick Stadium; Iowa City, IA (Floyd of Rosedale)	FOX	W 23–19	67,518
November 23	11:00 a.m.	Illinois	No. 17	Kinnick Stadium; Iowa City, IA	BTN	W 19–10	58,331
November 29	1:30 p.m.	at Nebraska	No. 17	Memorial Stadium; Lincoln, NE (Heroes Trophy)	BTN	W 27–24	89,039
December 27	7:00 p.m.	vs. No. 22 USC*	No. 16	SDCCU Stadium; San Diego, CA (Holiday Bowl)	FS1	W 49–24	50,123
*Non-conference game; ^{†}Homecoming; Rankings from AP Poll and CFP Rankings (after November 5) released prior to game; All times are in Central time

== Roster ==
2019 Iowa Hawkeyes football team roster
Players
Coaches
Offense

Pos.	#	Name	Class
QB	11	Connor Kapisak	Fr
QB	2	Peyton Mansell	So
QB	8	Alex Padilla	Fr
QB	7	Spencer Petras	Fr
QB	17	Ryan Schmidt	Sr
QB	4	Nate Stanley	Sr
RB	23	Shadrick Byrd	Fr
RB	1	Nolan Donald	Fr
RB	22	Samson Evans	Fr
RB	15	Tyler Goodson	Fr
RB	21	Ivory Kelly-Martin	Jr
RB	20	Keontae Luckett	Fr
RB	10	Mekhi Sargent	Jr
RB	28	Toren Young	Jr
FB	45	Joe Ludwig	So
FB	40	Turner Pallissard	Fr
FB	41	Johnny Plewa	Fr
FB	36	Brady Ross	Sr
WR	9	Jack Combs	So
WR	19	Max Cooper	Jr
WR	87	Javon Foy	Fr
WR	81	Desmond Hutson	Fr
WR	16	Charlie Jones	So
WR	83	Alec Kritta	Fr
WR	82	Calvin Lockett	Fr
WR	13	Henry Marchese	So
WR	5	Oliver Martin	So
WR	89	Nico Ragaini	Fr
WR	29	Jackson Ritter	Fr
WR	12	Brandon Smith	Jr
WR	6	Ihmir Smith-Marsette	Jr
WR	3	Tyrone Tracy	Fr
TE	42	Shaun Beyer	Jr
TE	18	Drew Cook	Sr
TE	86	Noah Feldman	So
TE	88	Jackson Frericks	Fr
TE	46	Tommy Kujawa	So
TE	84	Sam LaPorta	Fr
TE	48	Bryce Schulte	So
TE	39	Nate Wieting	Sr
OL	61	Cole Banwart	Jr
OL	63	Justin Britt	Fr
OL	56	Nick DeJong	Fr
OL	55	Luke Empen	Fr
OL	69	Tyler Endres	Fr
OL	54	Matt Fagan	Fr
OL	60	Noah Fenske	Fr
OL	58	Taylor Fox	Fr
OL	73	Cody Ince	Fr
OL	77	Alaric Jackson	Jr
OL	75	Jeff Jenkins	Fr
OL	71	Mark Kallenberger	So
OL	72	Coy Kirkpatrick	So
OL	65	Tyler Linderbaum	Fr
OL	76	Ezra Miller	Fr
OL	68	Landan Paulsen	Sr
OL	66	Levi Paulsen	Sr
OL	79	Jack Plumb	Fr
OL	64	Kyler Schott	So
OL	70	Kyle Sorensen	Fr
OL	57	Clayton Thurm	Fr
OL	74	Tristan Wirfs	Jr

Defense

Pos.	#	Name	Class
DE	94	A. J. Epenesa	Jr
DE	57	Chauncey Golston	Jr
DE	59	Nathan Nelson	Fr
DE	85	Logan Lee	Fr
DL	53	Spencer Daufeldt	Fr
DL	66	Dalles Jacobus	Jr
DL	93	Jake Karchinski	Fr
DL	95	Cedrick Lattimore	Sr
DL	90	Taajhir McCall	Fr
DL	98	Chris Reames	Fr
DL	91	Brady Reiff	Sr
DL	74	Austin Schulte	Jr
DL	99	Noah Shannon	Fr
DL	81	Ben Subbert	Fr
DL	92	John Waggoner	Fr
DL	97	Zach VanValkenburg	Jr
DT	54	Daviyon Nixon	So
DT	50	Louie Stec	Fr
LB	47	Nick Anderson	Sr
LB	44	Seth Benson	Fr
LB	31	Jack Campbell	Fr
LB	32	Djimon Colbert	So
LB	43	Dillon Doyle	Fr
LB	13	Joe Evans	Fr
LB	5	Jestin Jacobs	Fr
LB	55	Yahweh Jeudy	Fr
LB	52	Amani Jones	Sr
LB	46	Logan Klemp	Fr
LB	25	Jayden McDonald	Fr
LB	49	Nick Niemann	Jr
LB	38	Monte Pottebaum	Fr
LB	36	Mitch Riggs	Fr
LB	19	Mike Timm	Fr
LB	35	Barrington Wade	Jr
LB	34	Kristian Welch	Sr
DB	4	Dane Belton	Fr
DB	20	JuJu Brents	So
DB	29	Sebastian Castro	Fr
DB	15	Dallas Craddieth	Fr
DB	41	Colton Dinsdale	Sr
DB	1	Wes Dvorak	Sr
DB	37	Kyler Fisher	Fr
DB	8	Matt Hankins	Jr
DB	27	Jermari Harris	Fr
DB	21	Thomas Hartlieb	Fr
DB	12	D. J. Johnson	Fr
DB	28	Jack Koerner	So
DB	14	Daraun McKinney	Fr
DB	26	Kaevon Merriweather	So
DB	18	John Milani	Sr
DB	33	Riley Moss	So
DB	11	Michael Ojemudia	Sr
DB	16	Terry Roberts	Fr
DB	30	Quinn Schulte	Fr
DB	9	Geno Stone	Jr
DB	17	Devonte Young	Sr

Special teams

Pos.	#	Name	Class
K	96	Lucas Amaya	Fr
K	3	Keith Duncan	Jr
K	94	Caleb Shudak	Jr
P	2	Ryan Gersonde	So
P	7	Colten Rastetter	Sr
P	22	Michael Sleep-Dalton	Sr
LS	84	Austin Spiewak	Jr
LS	50	Jackson Subbert	Sr
LS	85	Nate Vejvoda	Sr

Head coach

- Kirk Ferentz

Coordinators/assistant coaches

- Brian Ferentz – Offensive Coordinator/Tight Ends
- Phil Parker – Defensive Coordinator/Secondary
- LeVar Woods – Special Teams Coordinator
- Kelvin Bell – Defensive Line
- Kelton Copeland – Wide Receivers
- Derrick Foster – Running Backs/Offensive Recruiting Coordinator
- Jay Niemann – Assistant Defensive Line/Defensive Recruiting Coordinator
- Ken O'Keefe – Quarterbacks
- Tim Polasek– Offensive Line
- Seth Wallace – Linebackers
- Chris Doyle – Strength and Conditioning
- Raimond Braithwaite – Assistant, Strength and Conditioning
- Cody Myers – Assistant, Strength and Conditioning
- Peter Remmes – Assistant, Strength and Conditioning
- Mark Weisman – Assistant, Strength and Conditioning
- Kohle Helle – Nutrition & Performance Analytics
- Paul Federici – Director, Football Operations
- Ben Hansen – Assistant Director, Football Operations
- Broderick Binns – Director, Player Development
- Scott Southmayd – Director, Player Personnel
- Max Allen – Director, Football New Media
- Tyler Barnes – Director, Recruiting
- Dylan Chmura – Graduate Assistant
- Miles Taylor – Graduate Assistant
- Keeston Terry – Graduate Assistant
- Shane Viilo – Graduate Assistant
- Martin Hopkins – Football Analyst
- Tyler Parker – Football Analyst
- Austin Showalter – Director of Football Analytics
- Bob Rahfeldt – Video Coordinator

Legend

- (C) Team captain
- (S) Suspended
- (I) Ineligible
- Injured
- Redshirt

Roster
Last update: 8/11/19

== Rankings ==
Ranking movements Legend: ██ Increase in ranking ██ Decrease in ranking
	Week																
Poll	Pre	1	2	3	4	5	6	7	8	9	10	11	12	13	14	15	Final
AP	20	20	19	18	14	14	17	23	20	19	18	23	19	19	18	19	15
Coaches	19	19	18	18	14	14	18	22	19	19	18	22	20	20	19	19	15
CFP	Not released										18	20	17	17	16	16	Not released

== Game summaries ==
=== Miami (OH) ===
Miami (OH) at No. 20 Iowa

Team	1	2	3	4	Total
RedHawks	0	7	0	7	14
• No. 20 Hawkeyes	3	7	14	14	38

- Date: August 31
- Location:
  Kinnick Stadium
  Iowa City, IA
- Game start: 6:45 p.m. CDT
- Elapsed time: 3:05
- Game attendance: 69,250
- Game weather: 66 °F (19 °C), mostly cloudy, Wind ENE 7 mph (11 km/h)
- Referee: Mark Kluczynski
- TV announcers (FS1): Brian Custer (play-by-play), Robert Smith (analyst)
- Source: Box Score

Scoring summary
1	1:17	Iowa	Keith Duncan 21-yard field goal	Iowa 3–0
2	11:54	M-OH	Jack Sorenson 11-yard pass from Brett Gabbert (Sam Sloman Kick)	M-OH 7–3
2	8:20	Iowa	Brandon Smith 9-yard pass from Nate Stanley (Keith Duncan kick)	Iowa 10–7
3	10:06	Iowa	Oliver Martin 9-yard pass from Nate Stanley (Keith Duncan kick)	Iowa 17–7
3	6:25	Iowa	Mekhi Sargent 2-yard run (Miguel Recinos kick)	Iowa 24–7
4	12:53	M-OH	Andrew Homer 20-yard pass from Brett Gabbert (Sam Sloman Kick)	Iowa 24–14
4	5:56	Iowa	Toren Young 2-yard run (Keith Duncan kick)	Iowa 31–14
4	3:03	Iowa	Ihmir Smith-Marsette 6-yard pass from Nate Stanley (Keith Duncan kick)	Iowa 38–14

Iowa played its first ever season-opening night game. Typical of first games under Ferentz, Iowa started out slow. The offense wasn't clicking for a great deal of the first half, but found a rhythm in the second as Iowa put up four touchdowns. The Hawkeyes had a balanced attack with 252 yards passing and 213 rushing with several running backs.

Statistics	M-OH	IOWA
First downs	11	26
Total yards	245	465
Rushing yards	59	213
Passing yards	186	252
Turnovers	1	1
Time of possession	24:03	35:57

Team	Category	Player	Statistics
Miami (OH)	Passing	Brett Gabbert	17/27, 186 yards, 2 TD, INT
Miami (OH)	Rushing	Davion Johnson	6 carries, 22 yards
Miami (OH)	Receiving	Jack Sorenson	5 receptions, 44 yards, TD
Iowa	Passing	Nate Stanley	21/30, 252 yards, 3 TD
Iowa	Rushing	Mekhi Sargent	14 carries, 91 yards, TD
Iowa	Receiving	Mekhi Sargent	4 receptions, 65 yards

=== Rutgers ===
Rutgers at No. 20 Iowa

Team	1	2	3	4	Total
Scarlet Knights	0	0	0	0	0
• No. 20 Hawkeyes	7	13	7	3	30

- Date: September 7
- Location:
  Kinnick Stadium
  Iowa City, IA
- Game start: 11:05 a.m. CDT
- Elapsed time: 3:06
- Game attendance: 61,808
- Game weather: 72 °F (22 °C), Mostly sunny, Wind WSW 4 mph (6.4 km/h)mph
- Referee: Jeff Servinski
- TV announcers (FS1): Justin Kutcher (play-by-play), Petros Papadakis (analyst), Shane Vereen (analyst)
- Source: Box Score

Scoring summary
1	12:18	Iowa	Ihmir Smith-Marsette 58-yard pass from Nate Stanley (Keith Duncan kick)	Iowa 7–0
2	8:13	Iowa	Tyrone Tracy 7-yard pass from Nate Stanley (Keith Duncan kick)	Iowa 14–0
2	3:50	Iowa	Keith Duncan 46-yard field goal	Iowa 17–0
2	0:00	Iowa	Keith Duncan 19-yard field goal	Iowa 20–0
3	2:50	Iowa	Ihmir Smith-Marsette 27-yard pass from Nate Stanley (Keith Duncan kick)	Iowa 27–0
4	11:05	Iowa	Keith Duncan 43-yard field goal	Iowa 30–0

Iowa went to the air early and often in their Big Ten opener. On his second touchdown pass, Nate Stanley passed Ricky Stanzi for third all-time on Iowa's career passing touchdown list. Ihmir Smith-Marsette had a career-high 113 yards receiving and two touchdowns. The Hawkeyes defense was smothering, shutting out the Scarlet Knights and forced three turnovers.

Statistics	RUT	IOWA
First downs	5	23
Total yards	125	438
Rushing yards	78	194
Passing yards	47	244
Turnovers	3	0
Time of possession	22:22	37:38

Team	Category	Player	Statistics
Rutgers	Passing	McLane Carter	6/16, 28 yards, INT
Rutgers	Rushing	Isiah Pacheco	9 carries, 36 yards
Rutgers	Receiving	Isiah Pacheco	4 receptions, 31 yards
Iowa	Passing	Nate Stanley	16/28, 236 yards, 3 TD
Iowa	Rushing	Mekhi Sargent; Toren Young	13 carries, 59 yards 9 carries, 59 yards
Iowa	Receiving	Ihmir Smith-Marsette	4 receptions, 113 yards, 2 TD

=== At Iowa State ===
No. 19 Iowa at Iowa State
Cy-Hawk Trophy

Team	1	2	3	4	Total
• No. 19 Hawkeyes	3	3	3	9	18
Cyclones	7	0	7	3	17

- Date: September 14
- Location:
  Jack Trice Stadium
  Ames, IA
- Game start: 3:11 p.m. CDT
- Elapsed time: 5:53
- Game attendance: 61,500
- Game weather: 67 °F (19 °C), overcast, Wind S 0–5 mph (0.0–8.0 km/h)
- Referee: Dan Capron
- TV announcers (FS1): Brian Custer (play-by-play), Robert Smith (analyst), Sarah Kustok (sideline)
- Source: Box Score

Scoring summary
1	7:37	Iowa	Keith Duncan 25-yard field goal	Iowa 3–0
1	5:44	ISU	L. Pettway 51-yard pass from D. Jones (C. Assalley)	ISU 7–3
2	0:00	Iowa	Keith Duncan 40-yard field goal	ISU 7–6
3	14:03	ISU	Tarique Milton 73-yard pass from Brock Purdy (C. Assalley kick)	ISU 14–6
3	2:15	Iowa	Keith Duncan 42-yard field goal	ISU 14–9
4	12:10	Iowa	Nate Stanley 1-yard run (Stanley pass failed)	Iowa 15–14
4	7:46	ISU	C. Assalley 26-yard field goal	ISU 17–15
4	4:51	Iowa	Keith Duncan 39-yard field goal	Iowa 18–17

ESPN's College GameDay was in Ames for the rivalry game with Lee Corso picking Iowa State to win the match-up. There were two weather delays in the first half which effectively made it a night game. It ended up being a back-and-forth contest with Iowa kicker Keith Duncan hitting four crucial field goals to keep the Hawkeyes in the game. Iowa held the Cyclones on a critical fourth down, however Iowa State still had a chance with over a minute in regulation. An Iowa State player ran into his teammate attempting to field the punt and it resulted in a muffed ball that Iowa pounced on. With the Cyclones having spent all their timeouts already, the Hawkeyes were simply able to run out the clock and the Cy-Hawk trophy remained in Iowa City for a fifth year in a row.

Statistics	IOWA	IOWA ST
First downs	18	20
Total yards	313	418
Rushing yards	112	91
Passing yards	201	327
Turnovers	0	2
Time of possession	34:58	25:02

Team	Category	Player	Statistics
Iowa	Passing	Nate Stanley	22/35, 201 yards
Iowa	Rushing	Mekhi Sargent	13 carries, 58 yards
Iowa	Receiving	Nico Ragaini	5 receptions, 43 yards
Iowa State	Passing	Brock Purdy	24/34, 276 yards, TD
Iowa State	Rushing	Kene Nwangwu	6 carries, 54 yards
Iowa State	Receiving	Tarique Milton	8 receptions, 144 yards, TD

=== Middle Tennessee ===
Middle Tennessee at No. 14 Iowa

Team	1	2	3	4	Total
Blue Raiders	0	0	3	0	3
• No. 14 Hawkeyes	17	7	10	14	48

- Date: September 28
- Location:
  Kinnick Stadium
  Iowa City, IA
- Game start: 11:01 CDT
- Elapsed time: 3:06
- Game attendance: 63,706
- Game weather: 61 °F (16 °C), Overcast, Wind NE 12 mph (19 km/h)
- Referee: Ron Snodgrass
- TV announcers (ESPN2): Kevin Brown (play-by-play), Andre Ware (analyst)
- Source: Box Score Archived 2019-10-03 at the Wayback Machine

Scoring summary
1	11:01	Iowa	Mekhi Sargent 4-yard run (Keith Duncan kick)	Iowa 7–0
1	4:54	Iowa	Keith Duncan 49-yard field goal	Iowa 10–0
1	0:15	Iowa	Brandon Smith 18-yard pass from Nate Stanley (Keith Duncan kick)	Iowa 17–0
2	8:33	Iowa	Brady Ross 1-yard run (Keith Duncan kick)	Iowa 24–0
3	10:52	Iowa	Keith Duncan 42-yard field goal	Iowa 27–0
3	5:24	MTSU	Crews Holt 43-yard field goal	Iowa 27–3
3	2:19	Iowa	Ihmir Smith-Marsette 14-yard run (Keith Duncan kick)	Iowa 34–3
4	10:01	Iowa	Brandon Smith 10-yard pass from Nate Stanley (Keith Duncan kick)	Iowa 41–3
4	0:47	Iowa	Spencer Petras 1-yard run (Keith Duncan kick)	Iowa 48–3

The Hawkeyes put up 644 yards of total offense (tops in the Ferentz era) as the Blue Raiders were unable to stop them. Toren Young was the most outstanding of the several Iowa backs that were able to play with 131 yards rushing on the day, and Nate Stanley had 276 yards passing and two touchdown passes to Brandon Smith. Iowa dominated ball possession, with almost 12 more minutes and forced the Blue Raiders into several three-and-outs.

Statistics	MTSU	IOWA
First downs	12	30
Total yards	216	644
Rushing yards	80	351
Passing yards	136	293
Turnovers	0	0
Time of possession	24:03	35:57

Team	Category	Player	Statistics
Middle Tennessee	Passing	Asher O'Hara	15/22, 110 yards
Middle Tennessee	Rushing	Asher O'Hara	10 carries, 43 yards
Middle Tennessee	Receiving	Jarrin Pierce	6 receptions, 31 yards
Iowa	Passing	Nate Stanley	17/25, 276 yards, 2 TD
Iowa	Rushing	Toren Young	11 carries, 131 yards
Iowa	Receiving	Brandon Smith	6 receptions, 71 yards, 2 TD

=== At No. 19 Michigan ===
No. 14 Iowa at No. 19 Michigan

Team	1	2	3	4	Total
No. 14 Hawkeyes	0	3	0	0	3
• No. 19 Wolverines	10	0	0	0	10

- Date: October 5
- Location:
  Michigan Stadium
  Ann Arbor, MI
- Game start: 12:05 p.m. EDT
- Elapsed time: 3:26
- Game attendance: 111,519
- Game weather: High 50s, Mostly cloudy, Wind SE 10–15 mph (16–24 km/h)
- Referee: Mike Cannon
- TV announcers (FOX): Gus Johnson (play-by-play), Joel Klatt (analyst), Jenny Taft (sideline)
- Source: Box Score

Scoring summary
1	12:19	Mich	Jake Moody 28-yard field goal	Michigan 3–0
1	8:33	Mich	Zach Charbonnet 2-yard run (Quinn Nordin kick)	Michigan 10–0
2	12:18	Iowa	Keith Duncan 22-yard field goal	Michigan 10–3

Statistics	IOWA	MICH
First downs	18	13
Total yards	261	267
Rushing yards	1	120
Passing yards	260	147
Turnovers	4	1
Time of possession	33:57	26:03

Team	Category	Player	Statistics
Iowa	Passing	Nate Stanley	23/42, 260 yards, 3 INT
Iowa	Rushing	Toren Young	8 carries, 40 yards
Iowa	Receiving	Nico Ragaini	6 receptions, 46 yards
Michigan	Passing	Shea Patterson	14/26, 147 yards, INT
Michigan	Rushing	Zach Charbonnet	13 carries, 42 yards, TD
Michigan	Receiving	Donovan Peoples-Jones	4 receptions, 26 yards

=== No. 10 Penn State ===
No. 10 Penn State at No. 17 Iowa

Team	1	2	3	4	Total
• No. 10 Nittany Lions	0	7	3	7	17
No. 17 Hawkeyes	3	3	0	6	12

- Date: October 12
- Location:
  Kinnick Stadium
  Iowa City, IA
- Game start: 6:44 p.m. CDT
- Elapsed time: 3:26
- Game attendance: 69,034
- Game weather: 52 °F (11 °C), mostly cloudy, Wind WSW 20 mph (32 km/h)
- Referee: John O'Neill
- TV announcers (ABC): Sean McDonough (play-by-play), Todd Blackledge (analyst), Holly Rowe (sideline)
- Source: Box Score

Scoring summary
1	2:12	Iowa	Keith Duncan 47-yard field goal	Iowa 3–0
2	8:36	Penn State	K. J. Hamler 22-yard pass from Sean Clifford (Jake Pinegar kick)	Penn State 7–3
2	0:20	Iowa	Keith Duncan 24-yard field goal	Penn State 7–6
3	2:08	Penn State	Jake Pinegar 33-yard field goal	Penn State 10–6
4	5:17	Penn State	Noah Cain 5-yard run (Jake Pinegar kick)	Penn State 17–6
4	2:31	Iowa	Brandon Smith 33-yard pass from Nate Stanley (Stanley pass intercepted)	Penn State 17–12

The Hawkeyes wore alternate gold jerseys. Iowa entered the game not having defeated Penn State since 2010.

Statistics	PSU	IOWA
First downs	20	21
Total yards	294	356
Rushing yards	177	70
Passing yards	117	286
Turnovers	0	2
Time of possession	32:52	27:08

Team	Category	Player	Statistics
Penn State	Passing	Sean Clifford	12/24, 117 yards, TD
Penn State	Rushing	Noah Cain	22 carries, 102 yards, TD
Penn State	Receiving	K. J. Hamler	7 receptions, 61 yards, TD
Iowa	Passing	Nate Stanley	25/43, 286 yards, TD, INT
Iowa	Rushing	Tyler Goodson	8 carries, 35 yards
Iowa	Receiving	Brandon Smith	7 receptions, 86 yards, TD

=== Purdue ===
Purdue at No. 23 Iowa

Team	1	2	3	4	Total
Boilermakers	0	7	0	13	20
• No. 23 Hawkeyes	6	3	7	10	26

- Date: October 19
- Location:
  Kinnick Stadium
  Iowa City, IA
- Game start: 11:01 am CDT
- Elapsed time: 3:13
- Game attendance: 69,250
- Game weather: 59 °F (15 °C), Mostly Cloudy, Wind SW 5–8 mph (8.0–12.9 km/h)
- Referee: Jerry McGinn
- TV announcers (ESPN2): Beth Mowins (play-by-play), Anthony Becht (analyst), Rocky Boiman (sideline)
- Source: Box Score

Scoring summary
1	7:45	Iowa	Keith Duncan 30-yard field goal	Iowa 3–0
1	2:08	Iowa	Keith Duncan 44-yard field goal	Iowa 6–0
2	2:14	Iowa	Keith Duncan 42-yard field goal	Iowa 9–0
2	0:38	Purdue	David Bell 7-yard pass from Jack Plummer (J.D. Dellinger kick)	Iowa 9–7
3	7:26	Iowa	Tyler Goodson 1-yard run (Keith Duncan kick)	Iowa 16–7
4	14:54	Iowa	Keith Duncan 38-yard field goal	Iowa 19–7
4	11:36	Purdue	J.D. Dellinger 27-yard field goal	Iowa 19–10
4	2:59	Purdue	J.D. Dellinger 36-yard field goal	Iowa 19–13
4	2:16	Iowa	Mekhi Sargent 14-yard run (Keith Duncan kick)	Iowa 26–13
4	0:24	Purdue	Payne Durham 1-yard pass from Jack Plummer (J.D. Dellinger kick)	Iowa 26–20

Purdue refused to go away in a wild second half. Iowa had to recover two onside kick attempts in order to seal this homecoming victory. The Hawkeyes made the Boilermakers one-dimensional as almost all of their offense came through the air. This marked the 300th combined win of the Fry-Ferentz era.

Statistics	PUR	IOWA
First downs	17	19
Total yards	360	362
Rushing yards	33	102
Passing yards	327	260
Turnovers	2	1
Time of possession	24:22	35:38

Team	Category	Player	Statistics
Purdue	Passing	Jack Plummer	30/40, 327 yards, 2 TD, INT
Purdue	Rushing	King Doerue	10 carries, 26 yards
Purdue	Receiving	David Bell	13 receptions, 197 yards, TD
Iowa	Passing	Nate Stanley	23/33, 260 yards, INT
Iowa	Rushing	Mekhi Sargent	13 carries, 68 yards, TD
Iowa	Receiving	Brandon Smith	9 receptions, 106 yards

=== At Northwestern ===
No. 20 Iowa at Northwestern

Team	1	2	3	4	Total
• No. 20 Hawkeyes	7	3	7	3	20
Wildcats	0	0	0	0	0

- Date: October 26
- Location:
  Ryan Field
  Evanston, IL
- Game start: 11:01 am CDT
- Elapsed time: 2:52
- Game attendance: 42,104
- Game weather: 48 °F (9 °C), Mostly cloudy, Wind E 12 mph (19 km/h)
- Referee: Larry Smith
- TV announcers (ESPN2): Roy Philpott, Kelly Stouffer, Lauren Sisler
- Source: Box Score

Scoring summary
1	8:38	Iowa	Tyrone Tracy 50-yard pass from Nate Stanley (Keith Duncan kick)	Iowa 7–0
2	12:25	Iowa	Keith Duncan 40-yard field goal	Iowa 10–0
3	5:23	Iowa	Mekhi Sargent 1-yard run (Keith Duncan kick)	Iowa 17–0
4	9:58	Iowa	Keith Duncan 28-yard field goal	Iowa 20–0

Iowa entered the game having lost three of the last four games at Ryan Field. The Hawkeyes were able to shut out the Wildcats for the first time since 1981 and spoil their homecoming. Iowa stopped Northwestern on several fourth down attempts to keep them off the board and did not turn the ball over. Nate Stanley also passed Drew Tate to move up to second on Iowa's career passing touchdown list with his 62nd touchdown.

Statistics	IOWA	NW
First downs	12	13
Total yards	302	202
Rushing yards	123	64
Passing yards	179	138
Turnovers	0	1
Time of possession	33:31	26:29

Team	Category	Player	Statistics
Iowa	Passing	Nate Stanley	12/26, 179 yards, TD
Iowa	Rushing	Tyler Goodson	11 carries, 58 yards
Iowa	Receiving	Tyrone Tracy Jr.	2 receptions, 88 yards, TD
Northwestern	Passing	Aidan Smith	18/32, 138 yards, INT
Northwestern	Rushing	Isaiah Bowser	14 carries, 36 yards
Northwestern	Receiving	Ramaud Chiaokhiao-Bowman	4 receptions, 41 yards

=== At No. 13 Wisconsin ===
No. 18 Iowa at No. 13 Wisconsin
Heartland Trophy

Team	1	2	3	4	Total
No. 18 Hawkeyes	3	3	0	16	22
• No. 13 Badgers	0	14	7	3	24

- Date: November 9
- Location:
  Camp Randall Stadium
  Madison, WI
- Game start: 3:00 pm CST
- Elapsed time: 3:15
- Game attendance: 78,018
- Game weather: 42 °F (6 °C), Mostly sunny, Wind SW 8 mph (13 km/h)
- Referee: Ron Snodgrass
- TV announcers (FOX): Tim Brando (play-by-play), Spencer Tillman (analyst), Coley Harvey (sideline)
- Source: Box Score

Scoring summary
1	7:38	Iowa	Keith Duncan 24-yard field goal	Iowa 3–0
2	9:44	Wis	Danny Davis III 17-yard run (Collin Larsh kick)	Wisconsin 7–3
2	6:31	Iowa	Keith Duncan 40-yard field goal	Wisconsin 7–6
2	0:14	Wis	Danny Davis III 4-yard pass from Jack Coan (Collin Larsh kick)	Wisconsin 14–6
3	2:16	Wis	Quintez Cephus 27-yard pass from Jack Coan (Collin Larsh kick)	Wisconsin 21–6
4	14:06	Iowa	Nico Ragaini 3-yard pass from Nate Stanley (Keith Duncan kick)	Wisconsin 21–13
4	9:27	Iowa	Keith Duncan 39-yard field goal	Wisconsin 21–16
4	3:29	Wis	Collin Larsh 29-yard field goal	Wisconsin 24–16
4	3:12	Iowa	Tyrone Tracy 75-yard pass from Nate Stanley (Stanley run failed)	Wisconsin 24–22

Once down 21–6, Iowa battled back and, after a 75-yard pass from Nate Stanley to Tyrone Tracy, had a chance to tie the game on a two-point conversation with 3:12 remaining. It was not to be and Wisconsin won their seventh of eight in this series. This was the first top 20 match-up between the universities since 2010.

Statistics	IOWA	WIS
First downs	15	24
Total yards	295	473
Rushing yards	87	300
Passing yards	208	173
Turnovers	1	2
Time of possession	22:36	37:24

Team	Category	Player	Statistics
Iowa	Passing	Nate Stanley	17/28, 208 yards, 2 TD
Iowa	Rushing	Toren Young	9 carries, 44 yards
Iowa	Receiving	Tyrone Tracy	5 receptions, 130 yards, TD
Wisconsin	Passing	Jack Coan	16/25, 173 yards, 2 TD, INT
Wisconsin	Rushing	Jonathan Tayler	31 carries, 250 yards
Wisconsin	Receiving	Quintez Cephus	5 receptions, 94 yards, TD

=== No. 8 Minnesota ===
No. 8 Minnesota at Iowa
Floyd of Rosedale

Team	1	2	3	4	Total
No. 8 Golden Gophers	0	6	7	6	19
• No. 23 Hawkeyes	13	7	0	3	23

- Date: November 16
- Location:
  Kinnick Stadium
  Iowa City, IA
- Game start: 3:05 pm CST
- Elapsed time: 3:16
- Game attendance: 67,518
- Game weather: 38 °F (3 °C), Mostly sunny, Wind SE 10 mph (16 km/h)
- Referee: Jerry McGinn
- TV announcers (FOX): Joe Davis, Brock Huard, Bruce Feldman
- Source: Box Score

Scoring summary
1	11:26	Iowa	Nico Ragaini 21-yard pass from Nate Stanley (Rastetter pass failed)	Iowa 6–0
1	0:18	Iowa	Tyler Goodson 10-yard run (Keith Duncan kick)	Iowa 13–0
2	9:47	Minn	Brock Walker 24-yard field goal	Iowa 13–3
2	6:20	Iowa	Ihmir Smith-Marsette 5-yard pass from Nate Stanley (Keith Duncan kick)	Iowa 20–3
2	0:00	Minn	Brock Walker 20-yard field goal	Iowa 20–6
3	11:35	Minn	Tyler Johnson 28-yard pass from Tanner Morgan (Brock Walker kick)	Iowa 20–13
4	7:13	Iowa	Keith Duncan 27-yard field goal	Iowa 23–13
4	3:27	Minn	Rodney Smith 1-yard run (kick failed)	Iowa 23–19

The unbeaten Golden Gophers entered the game ranked No. 8 and with CFP aspirations. Iowa was aggressive in the first half and put up three touchdowns. Minnesota was able to drive the ball but failed to score enough and left Iowa City having not defeated the Hawkeyes at Kinnick Stadium since Kirk Ferentz's first year in 1999. The Hawkeye fans stormed the field, fairly reminiscent of a game three years prior when Iowa knocked off a 9–0 Michigan squad that was ranked No. 2.

Statistics	MINN	IOWA
First downs	23	17
Total yards	431	290
Rushing yards	63	117
Passing yards	368	173
Turnovers	1	0
Time of possession	32:20	27:40

Team	Category	Player	Statistics
Minnesota	Passing	Tanner Morgan	25/36, 368 yards, TD
Minnesota	Rushing	Rodney Smith	14 carries, 46 yards, TD
Minnesota	Receiving	Tyler Johnson	9 receptions, 170 yards, TD
Iowa	Passing	Nate Stanley	14/23, 173 yards, 2 TD
Iowa	Rushing	Tyler Goodson	13 carries, 94 yards, TD
Iowa	Receiving	Tyrone Tracy Jr.	6 receptions, 77 yards

=== Illinois ===
Illinois at No. 17 Iowa

Team	1	2	3	4	Total
Fighting Illini	7	0	0	3	10
• No. 17 Hawkeyes	7	6	0	6	19

- Date: November 23
- Location:
  Kinnick Stadium
  Iowa City, IA
- Game start: 11:01 am CST
- Elapsed time: 3:09
- Game attendance: 58,331
- Game weather: 35 °F (2 °C), Partly cloudy, Wind SW 6 mph (9.7 km/h)
- Referee: Larry Smith
- TV announcers (BTN): Kevin Kugler, Matt Millen, Rick Pizzo
- Source: Box Score

Scoring summary
1	10:16	Iowa	Tyler Goodson 10-yard run (Keith Duncan kick)	Iowa 7–0
1	6:26	Illinois	Donny Navarro 31-yard pass from Brandon Peters (James McCourt kick)	Tied 7–7
2	9:34	Iowa	Keith Duncan 23-yard field goal	Iowa 10–7
2	0:00	Iowa	Keith Duncan 45-yard field goal	Iowa 13–7
4	14:08	Iowa	Keith Duncan 24-yard field goal	Iowa 16–7
4	10:52	Illinois	James McCourt 28-yard field goal	Iowa 16–10
4	2:44	Iowa	Keith Duncan 29-yard field goal	Iowa 19–10

Iowa won its sixth straight in this series, and Illinois hasn't won at Kinnick Stadium since 1999. After a Tyler Goodson touchdown run capped the opening drive, junior kicker Keith Duncan contributed four field goals in a game for the third time this season. On his fourth made kick, Duncan established a new single-season Big Ten record with 27 made field goals. The win over the Illini marked the 96th Big Ten Conference win for head coach Kirk Ferentz, tying him with Hayden Fry.

Statistics	ILL	IOWA
First downs	20	16
Total yards	336	387
Rushing yards	192	79
Passing yards	144	308
Turnovers	3	1
Time of possession	28:11	31:49

Team	Category	Player	Statistics
Illinois	Passing	Brandon Peters	16/31, 125 yards, TD, 2 INT
Illinois	Rushing	Brandon Peters	10 carries, 76 yards
Illinois	Receiving	Josh Imatorbhebhe	4 receptions, 36 yards
Iowa	Passing	Nate Stanley	18/35, 308 yards, INT
Iowa	Rushing	Tyler Goodson	21 carries, 38 yards, TD
Iowa	Receiving	Ihmir Smith-Marsette	4 receptions, 121 yards

=== At Nebraska ===
No. 17 Iowa at Nebraska
Heroes Trophy

Team	1	2	3	4	Total
• No. 17 Hawkeyes	14	10	0	3	27
Cornhuskers	3	7	14	0	24

- Date: November 29
- Location:
  Memorial Stadium
  Lincoln, NE
- Game start: 1:31 pm CST
- Elapsed time: 3:21
- Game attendance: 89,039
- Game weather: 35 °F (2 °C), Overcast/Light rain, Wind SE 8 mph (13 km/h)
- Referee: Mike Cannon
- TV announcers (BTN): Kevin Kugler (play-by-play), Matt Millen (analyst), Lisa Byington (sideline)
- Source: Box Score

Scoring summary
1	11:04	Iowa	Ihmir Smith-Marsette 45-yard run (Keith Duncan kick)	Iowa 7–0
1	4:03	Neb	Matt Waldoch 41-yard field goal	Iowa 7–3
1	3:08	Iowa	Tyler Goodson 55-yard run (Keith Duncan kick)	Iowa 14–3
2	11:37	Iowa	Keith Duncan 49-yard field goal	Iowa 17–3
2	8:54	Neb	Cam Taylor-Britt 38-yard interception return (Matt Waldoch kick)	Iowa 17–10
2	8:41	Iowa	Ihmir Smith-Marsette 95-yard kick return (Keith Duncan kick)	Iowa 24–10
3	8:24	Neb	JD Spielman 39-yard pass from Luke McCaffrey (Matt Waldoch kick)	Iowa 24–17
3	0:32	Neb	Wyatt Mazour 9-yard run (Matt Waldoch kick)	Tied 24–24
4	0:01	Iowa	Keith Duncan 48-yard field goal	Iowa 27–24

After being named a Groza finalist earlier in the week, junior kicker Keith Duncan nailed a 48-yard field goal with one second remaining to clinch the victory (and proceeded to blow kisses towards the Nebraska bench). Junior defensive end A. J. Epenesa anchored the defense with 14 tackles, 4.5 TFL, and 2 sacks. Junior Ihmir Smith-Marsette scored two long touchdowns, and freshman Tyler Goodson ran for 116 yards and a touchdown before leaving with an injury. Epenesa earned Big Ten Defensive Player of the Week for the second time in three weeks, and Duncan was named Big Ten Special Teams Player of the Week for the second straight week and third time this season. The Hawkeyes extended their winning streak in the series to five games overall, and it was Iowa's fourth consecutive road victory against the Cornhuskers.

Statistics	IOWA	NEB
First downs	13	18
Total yards	324	284
Rushing yards	225	184
Passing yards	99	100
Turnovers	2	2
Time of possession	26:09	33:51

Team	Category	Player	Statistics
Iowa	Passing	Nate Stanley	11/24, 99 yards, INT
Iowa	Rushing	Tyler Goodson	13 carries, 116 yards, TD
Iowa	Receiving	Sam LaPorta	3 receptions, 37 yards
Nebraska	Passing	Adrian Martinez	10/18, 50 yards, INT
Nebraska	Rushing	Dedrick Mills	24 carries, 94 yards
Nebraska	Receiving	Dedrick Mills; JD Spielman	4 receptions, 34 yards 3 receptions, 34 yards, TD

=== Vs. No. 22 USC (Holiday Bowl) ===
No. 22 USC vs. No. 16 Iowa
Holiday Bowl

Team	1	2	3	4	Total
No. 22 Trojans	7	10	7	0	24
• No. 16 Hawkeyes	7	21	7	14	49

- Date: December 27
- Location:
  SDCCU Stadium
  San Diego, CA
- Game start: 7:07 p.m. CST
- Elapsed time: 3:38
- Game attendance: 50,123
- Game weather: 58 °F (14 °C), Fair, Wind SW 4 mph (6.4 km/h)
- Referee: Jerry Magallane
- TV announcers (FS1): Gus Johnson (play-by-play), Joel Klatt (analyst) Jenny Taft (sideline)
- Source: Box Score

Scoring summary
1	8:25	Iowa	Tyrone Tracy 23-yard run (Keith Duncan kick)	Iowa 7–0
1	4:37	USC	Drake London 4-yard pass from Kedon Slovis (Chase McGrath kick)	Tied 7–7
2	11:22	Iowa	Ihmir Smith-Marsette 6-yard run (Keith Duncan kick)	Iowa 14–7
2	6:03	USC	Vavae Malepeai 16-yard pass from Kedon Slovis (Chase McGrath kick)	Tied 14–14
2	5:48	Iowa	Ihmir Smith-Marsette 98-yard kick return (Keith Duncan kick)	Iowa 21–14
2	1:18	Iowa	Ihmir Smith-Marsette 12-yard pass from Nate Stanley (Keith Duncan kick)	Iowa 28–14
2	0:00	USC	Chase McGrath 32-yard field goal	Iowa 28–17
3	13:29	USC	Stephen Carr 2-yard run (Chase McGrath kick)	Iowa 28–24
3	3:54	Iowa	Tyler Goodson 1-yard run (Keith Duncan kick)	Iowa 35–24
4	12:52	Iowa	Brandon Smith 6-yard pass from Nate Stanley (Keith Duncan kick)	Iowa 42–24
4	1:43	Iowa	Nick Niemann 25-yard interception return (Keith Duncan kick)	Iowa 49–24

Former head coach Hayden Fry died just ten days prior to the game and the Iowa helmets were without Tigerhawk decals to honor his legacy and impact on the program. Iowa's 49 points is the most in a bowl game under Ferentz, and the Hawkeyes handed USC its worst bowl loss since the 1948 Rose Bowl. Nate Stanley joined Ricky Stanzi as the second quarterback in Iowa history to win three bowl games, and also passed Drew Tate in career passing yards. Ihmir Smith-Marsette scored three touchdowns in the second quarter – a 6-yard run, 98-yard kickoff return, and 12-yard reception – to earn the game's offensive MVP. The Hawkeyes held USC to just seven points in the second half, led by the game's defensive MVP, A. J. Epenesa.

Statistics	USC	IOWA
First downs	20	20
Total yards	356	328
Rushing yards	22	115
Passing yards	334	213
Turnovers	3	0
Time of possession	26:36	33:24

Team	Category	Player	Statistics
USC	Passing	Kedon Slovis	22/30, 260 yards, 2 TD
USC	Rushing	Vavae Malepeai	8 carries, 37 yards
USC	Receiving	Amon-Ra St. Brown	9 receptions, 163 yards
Iowa	Passing	Nate Stanley	18/27, 213 yards, 2 TD
Iowa	Rushing	Tyler Goodson	18 carries, 48 yards, TD
Iowa	Receiving	Sam LaPorta	6 receptions, 44 yards

== Awards and honors ==
Individual Awards
Player	Award	Ref.
Keith Duncan	Bakken–Andersen Kicker of the Year	
Tristan Wirfs	Rimington–Pace Offensive Lineman of the Year	

== Players drafted into the NFL ==
Round	Pick	Player	Position	NFL Club
1	13	Tristan Wirfs	OT	Tampa Bay Buccaneers
2	54	A. J. Epenesa	DE	Buffalo Bills
3	77	Michael Ojemudia	CB	Denver Broncos
7	219	Geno Stone	S	Baltimore Ravens
7	244	Nate Stanley	QB	Minnesota Vikings
