= 2019 Holiday Bowl =

Postseason college football bowl game

2019 San Diego County Credit Union Holiday Bowl
- 42nd Holiday Bowl
USC Trojans	Iowa Hawkeyes
(8–4)	(9–3)
Pac-12	Big Ten
24	49
Head coach: Clay Helton	Head coach: Kirk Ferentz
AP / Coaches / CFP; 22 / 23 / 22	AP / Coaches / CFP; 19 / 19 / 16
	1	2	3	4	Total
USC	7	10	7	0	24
Iowa	7	21	7	14	49
- Date: December 27, 2019
- Season: 2019
- Stadium: SDCCU Stadium
- Location: San Diego, California
- MVP: Ihmir Smith-Marsette (WR, Iowa) & A. J. Epenesa (DE, Iowa)
- Favorite: USC by 1
- Referee: Jerry Magallanes (ACC)
- Attendance: 50,123
- Payout: US$6,532,700

United States TV coverage
- Network: FS1
- Announcers: Gus Johnson (play-by-play), Joel Klatt (analyst) and Jenny Taft (sideline)

The 2019 Holiday Bowl was a college football bowl game played on December 27, 2019. Kickoff was at 8:07 p.m. EST (5:07 p.m. local PST). The game was aired on FS1. It was the 42nd edition of the Holiday Bowl, and was one of the 2019–20 bowl games concluding the 2019 FBS football season. This was the third season in which the Holiday Bowl was held at SDCCU Stadium. The game was sponsored by San Diego County Credit Union and officially known as the San Diego County Credit Union Holiday Bowl.

This game marked the last Holiday Bowl with a tie-in with the Big Ten Conference, as the bowl replaced its Big Ten tie-in with an Atlantic Coast Conference (ACC) tie-in. This was also the last Holiday Bowl played at SDCCU Stadium, as the 2020 edition was cancelled due to the COVID-19 pandemic, and the venue was subsequently demolished to make way for a new stadium.

== Teams ==
The game featured the USC Trojans of the Pac-12 Conference and Iowa Hawkeyes of the Big Ten Conference. This was the 10th meeting between the two programs, with USC holding a 7–2 edge in previous meetings. This was Iowa's fourth Holiday Bowl, going 2–0–1 in previous appearances in 1986 (won against SDSU Aztecs 39–38), 1987 (won against Wyoming Cowboys 20–19) and 1991 (tied against BYU Cougars 13–13 – this was the last time a postseason game was tied in the NCAA). This was USC's third Holiday Bowl, going 1–1 in previous appearances in 2014 (won against Nebraska Cornhuskers 45–42) and 2015 (lost against Wisconsin Badgers 21–23). The teams had previously met in the 2003 Orange Bowl, where USC won by a score of 38–17.

=== USC Trojans ===
The Trojans entered the game with an 8–4 record (7–2 in conference) and ranked 22nd in the AP Poll. The Trojans finished in second place in the Pac-12's South Division. USC was 2–3 against ranked teams.

=== Iowa Hawkeyes ===
The Hawkeyes entered the game ranked 19th in the AP Poll (16th in the CFP poll), with a 9–3 record (6–3 in conference). The Hawkeyes finished in third place in the Big Ten's West Division. Iowa was 1–3 against ranked teams.

== Game summary ==
2019 San Diego County Credit Union Holiday Bowl

Quarter	1	2	3	4	Total
No. 22 USC	7	10	7	0	24
No. 16 Iowa	7	21	7	14	49

at SDCCU Stadium • San Diego, California

- Date: Friday, December 27, 2019
- Game time: 8:00 p.m. EST (5:00 p.m. PST)
- Game attendance: 50,123
- Referee: Jerry Magallanes
- TV announcers (FS1): Gus Johnson (play-by-play), Joel Klatt (analyst) and Jenny Taft (sideline)
- ESPN game summary

Game information

First Quarter

- (8:25) IOWA – Tyrone Tracy 23 yard rush, Keith Duncan kick (Drive: 10 plays, 75 yards, 6:35; Iowa 7–0)
- (4:37) USC – Kedon Slovis 5 yard pass to Drake London, Chase McGrath kick (Drive: 9 plays, 75 yards, 3:48; Tied 7–7)

Second Quarter

- (11:22) IOWA – Ihmir Smith-Marsette 6 yard rush, Keith Duncan kick (Drive: 15 plays, 72 yards, 8:09; Iowa 14–7)
- (6:03) USC – Kedon Slovis 16 yard pass to Vavae Malepeai, Chase McGrath kick (Drive: 11 plays, 77 yards, 5:19; Tied 14–14)
- (5:48) IOWA – Ihmir Smith-Marsette 98 yard kickoff return, Keith Duncan kick (Iowa 21–14)
- (1:18) IOWA – Nate Stanley 12 yard pass to Ihmir Smith-Marsette, Keith Duncan kick (Drive: 6 plays, 52 yards, 3:07; Iowa 28–14)
- (0:00) USC – Chase McGrath 32 yard field goal (Drive: 11 plays, 61 yards, 1:18; Iowa 28–17)

Third Quarter

- (13:29) USC – Stephen Carr 3 yard rush, Chase McGrath kick (Drive: 4 plays, 75 yards, 1:31; Iowa 28–24)
- (3:54) IOWA – Tyler Goodson 1 yard rush, Keith Duncan kick (Drive: 14 plays, 90 yards, 7:19; Iowa 35–24)

Fourth Quarter

- (12:52) IOWA – Nate Stanley 6 yard pass to Brandon Smith, Keith Duncan kick (Drive: 3 plays, 6 yards, 0:54; Iowa 42–24)
- (1:43) IOWA – Nick Niemann 25 yard interception return, Keith Duncan kick (Iowa 49–24)

=== Statistics ===
Statistics	USC	IOWA
First downs	20	20
Plays–yards	66–356	63–328
Rushes–yards	18–22	35–115
Passing yards	334	213
Passing: comp–att–int	34–48–1	18–28–0
Time of possession	26:36	33:24

Team	Category	Player	Statistics
USC	Passing	Kedon Slovis	22/30, 260 yards, 2 TD
USC	Rushing	Vavae Malepeai	8 carries, 37 yards
USC	Receiving	Amon-Ra St. Brown	9 receptions, 163 yards
Iowa	Passing	Nate Stanley	18/27, 213 yards, 2 TD
Iowa	Rushing	Tyler Goodson	18 carries, 48 yards, 1 TD
Iowa	Receiving	Nico Ragaini	2 receptions, 54 yards
