= LeVar Woods =

American football player and coach (born 1978)

Current position
- Title: Special teams coordinator & assistant head coach
- Team: Michigan State
- Conference: Big Ten

Biographical details
- Born: March 15, 1978 (age 48); Cleveland, Ohio, U.S.

Playing career
- 1998–2000: Iowa
- 2001–2004: Arizona Cardinals
- 2005: Chicago Bears*
- 2005–2006: Detroit Lions
- 2006–2007: Tennessee Titans
- Position: Linebacker

Coaching career (HC unless noted)
- 2008–2011: Iowa (Admin. Ass.)
- 2012–2014: Iowa (LB/STA)
- 2015–2017: Iowa (TE/STA)
- 2018–2025: Iowa (STC)
- 2026–present: Michigan State (STC/AHC)

LeVar Woods (born March 15, 1978) is the special teams coordinator and assistant head coach for the Michigan State Spartans football team. Woods played linebacker for the Hawkeyes, under both Hayden Fry and Kirk Ferentz. He played professionally with the Arizona Cardinals, Detroit Lions, and Tennessee Titans in the NFL.

Woods has held a variety of administrative and on-field coaching positions since the end of his playing career, all with Iowa up until 2026, when he took on the special teams coordinator position at Michigan State.

== Early life ==
Woods attended West Lyon High School in Larchwood, Iowa and was a letterman in football, basketball, and track. He graduated from West Lyon High School in 1996. Woods was the Iowa 2A player of the year as a senior.

== College career ==
Woods attended the University of Iowa, and was a letterman in football. Playing for both Hayden Fry and Kirk Ferentz, he was a two-year starter as an outside linebacker. In 1999, he returned a blocked field goal for a touchdown against Northern Illinois to help clinch Ferentz's first Iowa victory. He finished his college career with four sacks and 165 tackles. As a senior, he was an All-Big Ten Conference honorable mention selection, and was given the Hayden Fry Extra Heartbeat Award.

== Professional career ==
Woods played in the NFL from 2001 to 2007. After going undrafted in the 2001 NFL draft, he signed for the Arizona Cardinals, where he played four seasons. He later played for the Detroit Lions and Tennessee Titans. Mostly a reserve linebacker in the NFL, Woods excelled on special teams. In 88 career games, Woods totaled 168 tackles, 2.5 quarterback sacks, four fumble recoveries and one forced fumble.

During his NFL career, Woods was named a finalist for both the Byron “Whizzer” White and Walter Payton Man of the Year awards, recognizing his contributions to charity.

== Coaching career ==
=== Early Iowa coaching career (2008–2017) ===
Following his retirement from the sport, Woods and his family relocated to Iowa City, though Woods wasn't sure if coaching was in his future. He joined the Iowa football staff as a low-paid administrative assistant in 2008, a role he held for four seasons. As an administrative assistant, Woods compiled statistics, helped with recruiting, social media, and the Iowa football website. At the end of the 2010 season, Iowa defensive coordinator Norm Parker had a foot amputated due to diabetes complications, and Woods became an interim assistant coach in Parker's absence. After the 2011 regular season, Iowa defensive line coach Rick Kaczenski left to join the Nebraska program, and Woods filled in as the defensive line coach for the 2011 Insight Bowl against Oklahoma.

In 2012, Woods was promoted to a full-time on-field assistant coach, coaching outside linebackers and assisting with special teams. Woods and middle linebackers coach Jim Reid developed an excellent linebacking trio in Christian Kirksey, Anthony Hitchens, and James Morris, each earning All-Big Ten recognition. Reid and Woods were named national Linebacker Coaches of the Year by FootballScoop following the 2013 season.

In 2015, Woods switched to tight ends coach, continuing to assist with special teams. Coaching tight ends until 2017, Woods developed two and three-star prospects into starting tight ends. These players included Henry Krieger-Coble, Jake Duzey, and future All-Pro George Kittle. Woods also coached the early careers of Noah Fant and T.J. Hockensen, both future first-round picks. In 2017, Woods landed one of Iowa's highest-ranked recruits ever in defensive end A.J. Epenesa.

=== Iowa special teams coordinator (2018–2025) ===
In 2017, Woods was named special teams coordinator after several seasons of assisting with special teams operations. In 2018, Woods became Iowa's full-time special teams coordinator without coaching another position.

Under Woods' guidance, Hawkeye special teams were consistently ranked among national leaders in punt and kick return and return defense. Woods developed several All-Big Ten and All-American specialists and returners.

In 2019, placekicker Keith Duncan earned consensus first-team All-America honors, was named the Bakken-Andersen Kicker of the Year in the Big Ten and was one of three finalists for the Lou Groza Award. Duncan was replaced after graduation by Caleb Shudak, who was first-team All-Big Ten in 2021. In 2020, freshman punter Tory Taylor was named the Eddleman–Fields Punter of the Year in the Big Ten and finished as a semifinalist for the Ray Guy Award. Taylor would repeat his all-conference award in 2023, in addition to winning the Ray Guy award, given to the nation's top punter. Taylor is the only player to win the top Big Ten punter award multiple times.

As a return specialist in 2016, Desmond King ranked second in the Big Ten in kickoff returns and third in punt returns. As a team, Iowa led the conference and ranked seventh nationally in kickoff returns, while ranking second in the Big Ten and 11th nationally in punt returns. Return man and wide receiver Ihmir Smith-Marsette won the 2018 Rodgers-Dwight Big Ten Return Specialist of the Year, after finishing second nationally in average return yards. In 2021, former walk-on transfer Charlie Jones won the Rodgers-Dwight Big Ten Return Specialist of the Year for his kick and punt return efforts. In 2023, defensive back Cooper DeJean won the Rodgers-Dwight award, as did wide receiver Kaden Wetjen in 2024. Wetjen also won the 2024 Jet Award, awarded nationally to the top return specialist in college football.

Woods was named FootballScoop's Special Teams Coordinator of the Year in 2023.

The Hawkeye special teams scored on several trick plays designed by Woods, including a "swinging gate" direct snap from long snapper Jackson Subbert to tight end T.J. Hockenson against Minnesota, and an over-the-shoulder catch by defensive lineman Sam Brincks from a pass by punter Colten Rastetter against Penn State. In Iowa's 2017 55–24 upset win over #3 Ohio State, an elaborate "polecat" fake field goal ended with Rastetter completing a pass to long snapper Tyler Kluver, who stumbled at the goal line but set up a Hawkeye touchdown.
