= Jake Gervase =

American football player (born 1995)

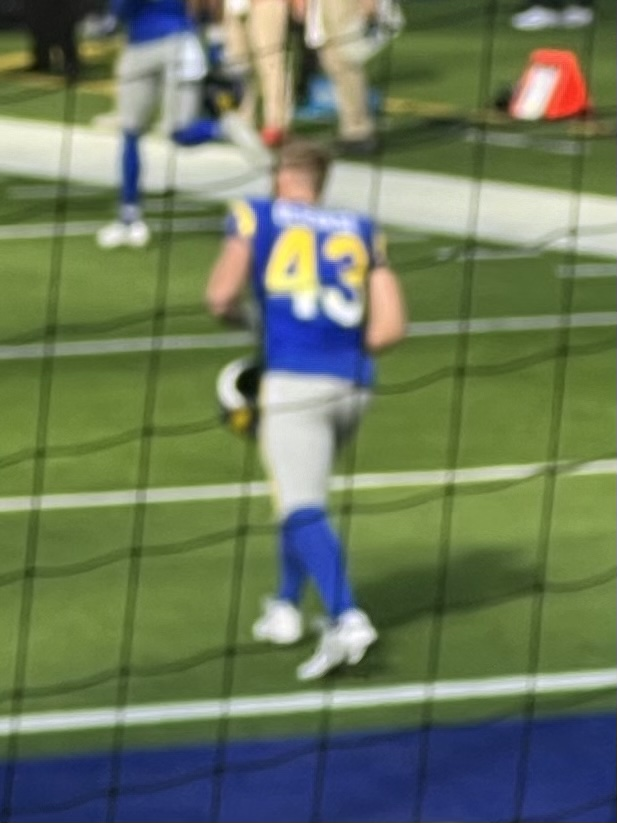
- Gervase with the Los Angeles Rams in 2022

No. 39, 43
- Position: Safety

Personal information
- Born: September 18, 1995 (age 31); Davenport, Iowa, U.S.
- Listed height: 6 ft 1 in (1.85 m)
- Listed weight: 212 lb (96 kg)

Career information
- High school: Assumption (Davenport)
- College: Iowa (2014–2018)
- NFL draft: 2019: undrafted

Career history
- Los Angeles Rams (2019–2022); Minnesota Vikings (2023)*
- * Offseason or practice squad member only

Awards and highlights
- Super Bowl champion (LVI)

Career NFL statistics as of 2023
- Total tackles: 8
- Stats at Pro Football Reference

Jake Gervase (born September 18, 1995) is an American former professional football player who was a safety in the National Football League (NFL). He played in the NFL from 2019 to 2022 for the Los Angeles Rams, with whom he won Super Bowl LVI. He played college football for the Iowa Hawkeyes.

== College career ==
Gervase was a member of the Iowa Hawkeyes for five seasons, joining the team as a walk-on and redshirting his true freshman season. As a redshirt senior, he led the Hawkeyes with 89 tackles, seven passes broken up, and four interceptions and was named honorable mention All-Big Ten Conference. Gervase finished his collegiate career with 153 total tackles and seven interceptions in 44 games played.

== Professional career ==
Pre-draft measurables
Height	Weight	Arm length	Hand span	40-yard dash	10-yard split	20-yard split	20-yard shuttle	Three-cone drill	Vertical jump	Broad jump	Bench press
6 ft 0 5/8 in (1.84 m)	210 lb (95 kg)	30 in (0.76 m)	9 1/8 in (0.23 m)	4.56 s	1.53 s	2.61 s	4.17 s	6.84 s	37.5 in (0.95 m)	9 ft 9 in (2.97 m)	20 reps
All values from Pro Day

=== Los Angeles Rams ===
Gervase signed with the Los Angeles Rams as an undrafted free agent on May 14, 2019. Gervase was waived on August 31, as part of final roster cuts, but was re-signed to the Rams' practice squad the following day. Gervase was promoted to the Rams' active roster on October 19. He made his NFL debut the following day in a 37–10 against the Atlanta Falcons, playing one snap on defense and 13 on special teams.

On July 25, 2020, Gervase was waived by the Rams. He re-signed with the Rams on August 14. Gervase was waived on September 4. He was re-signed to their practice squad on November 3. He was placed on the practice squad/COVID-19 list by the team on November 18, and restored to the practice squad on November 28. Gervase was elevated to the active roster on December 19 for the team's week 15 game against the New York Jets, and reverted to the practice squad after the game. On January 25, 2021, Gervase signed a reserve/futures contract with the Rams. Gervase made a transition to inside linebacker for the 2021 season.

On August 31, 2021, Gervase was waived by the Rams. He was re-signed to their practice squad on September 24. Gervase was signed to the active roster on January 12, 2022. Gervase played in two games on special teams and recorded two tackles during the regular season and also played in all four of the Rams' postseason games, including the team's 23–20 win over the Cincinnati Bengals in Super Bowl LVI.

On May 23, 2022, Gervase re-signed with the Rams. Gervase was waived during final roster cuts on August 30. He was placed on injured reserve on December 24.

=== Minnesota Vikings ===
On August 24, 2023, Gervase signed with the Minnesota Vikings. He was released by the Vikings on August 28.
