= Cedrick Lattimore =

American football player (born 1998)

Profile
- Position: Defensive tackle

Personal information
- Born: February 6, 1998 (age 28); Redford, Michigan, U.S.
- Listed height: 6 ft 3 in (1.91 m)
- Listed weight: 295 lb (134 kg)

Career information
- High school: East English Village Preparatory Academy
- College: Iowa
- NFL draft: 2020: undrafted

Career history
- Seattle Seahawks (2020); Philadelphia Stars (2022–2023); Calgary Stampeders (2025)*
- * Offseason or practice squad member only
- Stats at Pro Football Reference
- Stats at CFL.ca

Cedrick Lattimore (born February 6, 1998) is an American professional football defensive tackle. He played college football for the Iowa Hawkeyes, and signed with the Seattle Seahawks as an undrafted free agent in 2020.

== Professional career ==
=== Seattle Seahawks ===
Lattimore signed with the Seattle Seahawks as an undrafted free agent following the 2020 NFL draft on May 4, 2020. He was waived during final roster cuts on September 5, 2020, and signed to the team's practice squad the next day. He was elevated to the active roster on January 9, 2021, for the team's wild card playoff game against the Los Angeles Rams, and reverted to the practice squad after the game. He signed a reserve/futures contract with the Seahawks on January 11, 2021. Lattimore was waived on August 23, 2021.

=== Philadelphia Stars ===
Lattimore signed with the Philadelphia Stars of the United States Football League on April 22, 2022, and he was transferred to the team's inactive roster. He was moved to the active roster on May 5.

Lattimore was placed on the injured reserve list by the team on May 3, 2023. He re-signed with the Stars on September 30, 2023. The Stars folded when the XFL and USFL merged to create the United Football League (UFL).

=== Calgary Stampeders ===
On February 3, 2025, Lattimore signed with the Calgary Stampeders of the Canadian Football League (CFL). He was released on May 11, 2025.
