= Mekhi Sargent =

American football player (born 1997)

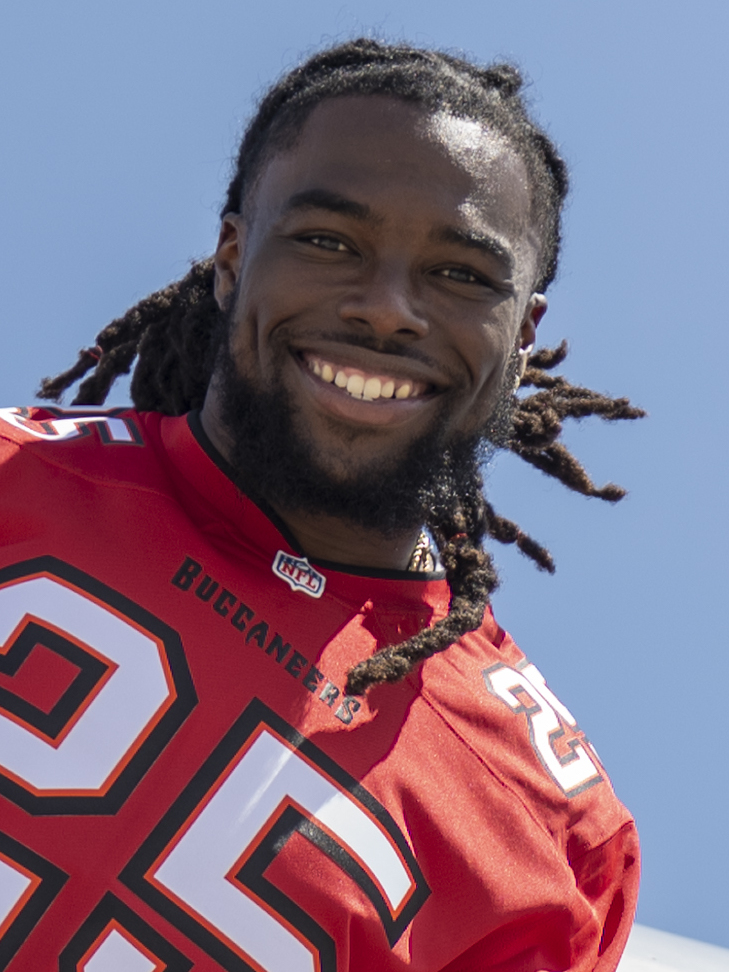
- Sargent in 2023

Profile
- Position: Running back

Personal information
- Born: October 8, 1997 (age 29); Key West, Florida, U.S.
- Listed height: 5 ft 8 in (1.73 m)
- Listed weight: 208 lb (94 kg)

Career information
- High school: Key West
- College: Iowa Western (2017); Iowa (2018–2020)
- NFL draft: 2021: undrafted

Career history
- Tennessee Titans (2021); Los Angeles Rams (2021); Jacksonville Jaguars (2021)

Career NFL statistics
- Rushing yards: 9
- Rushing touchdowns: 0
- Stats at Pro Football Reference

Mekhi Sargent (born October 8, 1997) is an American professional football running back. He played college football for the Iowa Western Reivers and Iowa Hawkeyes He signed with the Tennessee Titans after going undrafted in the 2021 NFL draft. He also played for the Los Angeles Rams and Jacksonville Jaguars.

== Professional career ==
Pre-draft measurables
Height	Weight	Arm length	Hand span	40-yard dash	10-yard split	20-yard split	20-yard shuttle	Three-cone drill	Vertical jump	Broad jump	Bench press
5 ft 8 3/8 in (1.74 m)	208 lb (94 kg)	30 3/8 in (0.77 m)	9 3/8 in (0.24 m)	4.69 s	1.50 s	2.68 s	4.30 s	7.08 s	33.5 in (0.85 m)	9 ft 5 in (2.87 m)	18 reps
All values from Pro Day

=== Tennessee Titans ===
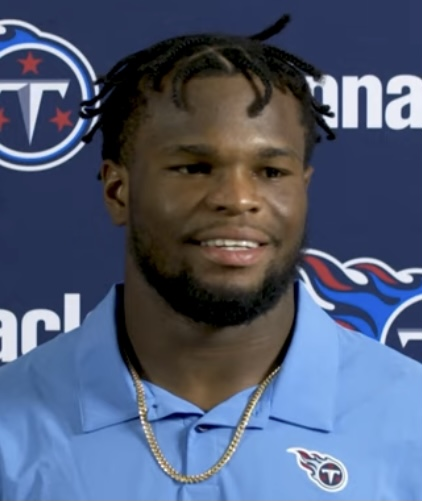
Sargent in 2021

Sargent signed with the Tennessee Titans as an undrafted free agent on May 14, 2021. He made the 53-man roster on August 31 as the Titans' No. 3 running back on the depth chart to start the season. He played in three games before being waived on October 23, 2021, but was re-signed to the practice squad. On November 1, 2021, Sargent was released from the practice squad.

=== Los Angeles Rams ===
Sargent was signed to the Los Angeles Rams practice squad on November 4, 2021. He was promoted to the active roster on December 8. He was waived on December 25.

=== Jacksonville Jaguars ===
Sargent was claimed off waivers by the Jacksonville Jaguars on December 27, 2021. He was waived on August 30, 2022. He signed a reserve/future contract on January 23, 2023. He was waived on April 3.

Sargent was invited to the Tampa Bay Buccaneers' rookie minicamp on a tryout basis in May 2023.
