= Joe Evans (American football) =

American football player (born 1999)

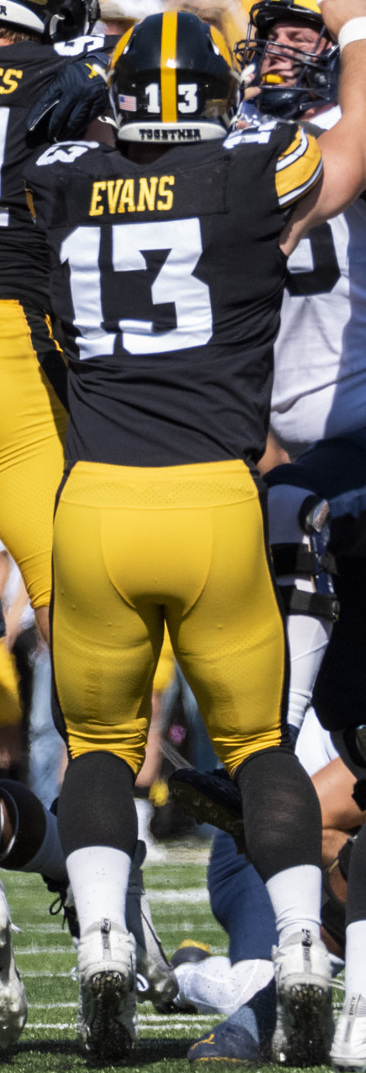

Profile
- Position: Linebacker

Personal information
- Born: June 29, 1999 (age 27); Ames, Iowa, U.S.
- Listed height: 6 ft 1 in (1.85 m)
- Listed weight: 252 lb (114 kg)

Career information
- High school: Ames (Ames, Iowa)
- College: Iowa (2018–2023)
- NFL draft: 2024: undrafted

Career history
- Baltimore Ravens (2024)*
- * Offseason or practice squad member only

Awards and highlights
- Second-team All-Big Ten (2022); Third team All-Big Ten (2023)
- Stats at Pro Football Reference

Joe Evans (born June 29, 1999) is an American professional football linebacker. He played college football for the Iowa Hawkeyes.

== Early life ==
Evans attended high school at Ames. In Evans junior season after being forced to play quarterback after injuries to the starter, he completed 106 of his 178 passes for 1,276 yards and 17 touchdowns, while also adding 439 yards and five touchdowns on the ground. Coming out of high school, Evans decided to walk-on to play college football for the Iowa Hawkeyes.

== College career ==
In Evans true freshman season in 2018, he did not appear in any games and would redshirt. In the 2019 season, Evans posted seven tackles with four being for a loss, and four sacks. During the 2020 season, Evans was put on scholarship by the Hawkeyes. In the COVID-shortened 2020 season, Evans tallied seven tackles with two going for a loss, a sack, and a pass deflection. In 2021, Evans would breakout notching 33 tackles with seven being for a loss, seven sacks, a pass deflection, and a forced fumble. In week one of the 2022 season, Evans tallied two sacks, and a safety as he helped Iowa to a 7–3 win over South Dakota State. In week eight, Evans sacked quarterback C. J. Stroud, while also forcing a fumble which he returned 12 yards for his first career touchdown against #2 Ohio State. In the 2022 season, Evans totaled 41 tackles with 8 1/2 going for a loss, 6 1/2 sacks, and two forced fumbles. For his performance in the 2022 season, Evans was named second team all Big-10. In week 12 of the 2023 season, Evans notched four tackles with 1 1/2 going for a loss, a sack, a safety, and three pass deflections, as he helped the Hawkeyes beat Illinois, 15–13. In the Citrus Bowl, Evans notched a career-high four sacks in a loss to Tennessee. For the 2023 season, Evans made 46 tackles with 13 1/2 going for a loss, 9 1/2 sacks, four pass deflections, and a forced fumble.

== Professional career ==
Pre-draft measurables
Height	Weight	Arm length	Hand span	40-yard dash	10-yard split	20-yard split	20-yard shuttle	Three-cone drill	Vertical jump	Broad jump	Bench press
6 ft 1 3/8 in (1.86 m)	246 lb (112 kg)	30 1/2 in (0.77 m)	9 1/4 in (0.23 m)	4.67 s	1.61 s	2.72 s	4.40 s	7.10 s	41.5 in (1.05 m)	9 ft 9 in (2.97 m)	24 reps
All values from Pro Day

Evans signed with the Baltimore Ravens as an undrafted free agent on May 3, 2024. He was waived on August 27, and re-signed to the practice squad. He was released on September 24.
