= Noah Shannon =

American football player (born 2000)

Profile
- Position: Defensive tackle

Personal information
- Born: March 16, 2000 (age 26); Montgomery, Illinois, U.S.
- Listed height: 6 ft 0 in (1.83 m)
- Listed weight: 285 lb (129 kg)

Career information
- High school: Oswego (Oswego, Illinois)
- College: Iowa (2018–2023)
- NFL draft: 2024: undrafted

Career history
- Las Vegas Raiders (2024)*
- * Offseason or practice squad member only

Noah Shannon (born March 16, 2000) is an American professional football defensive tackle. He previously played college football for the Iowa Hawkeyes.

== Early life ==
Shannon grew up in Montgomery, Illinois and attended Oswego High School in Oswego, Illinois, where he lettered in football and baseball. Coming out of high school, Shannon was rated as a three star recruit, where he decided to commit to play college football for the Iowa Hawkeyes.

== College career ==
In Shannon's first collegiate season with the Hawkeyes in 2018, Shannon did not play and use the season to redshirt. Over the next three seasons n 2019, 2020, and 2021, Shannon played in 24 games, totaling 63 tackles with two and a half being for a loss, two and a half sacks, a pass deflection, a fumble recovery, and a forced fumble. During the 2022 season, Shannon tallied 44 tackles with eight and a half being for a loss, and two sacks. On August 23, 2023, Shannon was suspended for the entirety of the 2023 season due to gambling on the Hawkeyes women's basketball team. Shannon attempted to appeal his suspension to the NCAA but was denied, resulting in him not appearing in a game for the Hawkeyes in 2023.

== Professional career ==
Pre-draft measurables
Height	Weight	Arm length	Hand span	40-yard dash	10-yard split	20-yard split	20-yard shuttle	Three-cone drill	Vertical jump	Broad jump	Bench press
6 ft 0 3/8 in (1.84 m)	285 lb (129 kg)	31 1/2 in (0.80 m)	8 3/4 in (0.22 m)	5.39 s	1.77 s	3.03 s	4.45 s	7.19 s	27 in (0.69 m)	8 ft 6 in (2.59 m)	21 reps
All values from Pro Day

After not being selected in the 2024 NFL draft, Shannon signed with the Las Vegas Raiders as an undrafted free agent on April 27, 2024. He was waived on August 27.
