= Keith Duncan =

American football player (born 1998)

No. 3
- Position: Placekicker

Personal information
- Born: February 19, 1998 (age 28); Arlington, Texas, U.S.
- Listed height: 5 ft 10 in (1.78 m)
- Listed weight: 180 lb (82 kg)

Career information
- High school: Weddington (Matthews, North Carolina)
- College: Iowa (2016–2021)

Awards and highlights
- Consensus All-American (2019); Big Ten Kicker of the Year (2019); First-team All-Big Ten (2019); Third-team All-Big Ten (2020)
- Stats at ESPN

Keith Duncan (born February 19, 1998) is an American former college football placekicker. He played for the Iowa Hawkeyes, where he was a consensus All-American.

== Early life ==
Duncan grew up in Weddington, North Carolina and attended Weddington High School. He set state records for field goals in a season (22) and total field goals (51) and consecutive extra points made (104).

== College career ==
Duncan was named Iowa's kicker going into his freshman year, making nine field goals on 11 attempts and converting 38 of 39 extra point attempts. Duncan lost the starting kicker job going into the next season to Miguel Recinos and redshirted his sophomore season and also did not see any action the following year. He was named the Hawkeyes starting kicker again going into his redshirt junior year. Duncan was named first team All-Big Ten Conference and the Conference Kicker of the Year after making a Big Ten record 29 of 34 field goal attempts. Duncan was also named a consensus first team All-American and was a finalist for the Lou Groza Award. Duncan was named to the Big Ten Network's All-Decade team for the 2010s.
