= Ihmir Smith-Marsette =

American football player (born 1999)

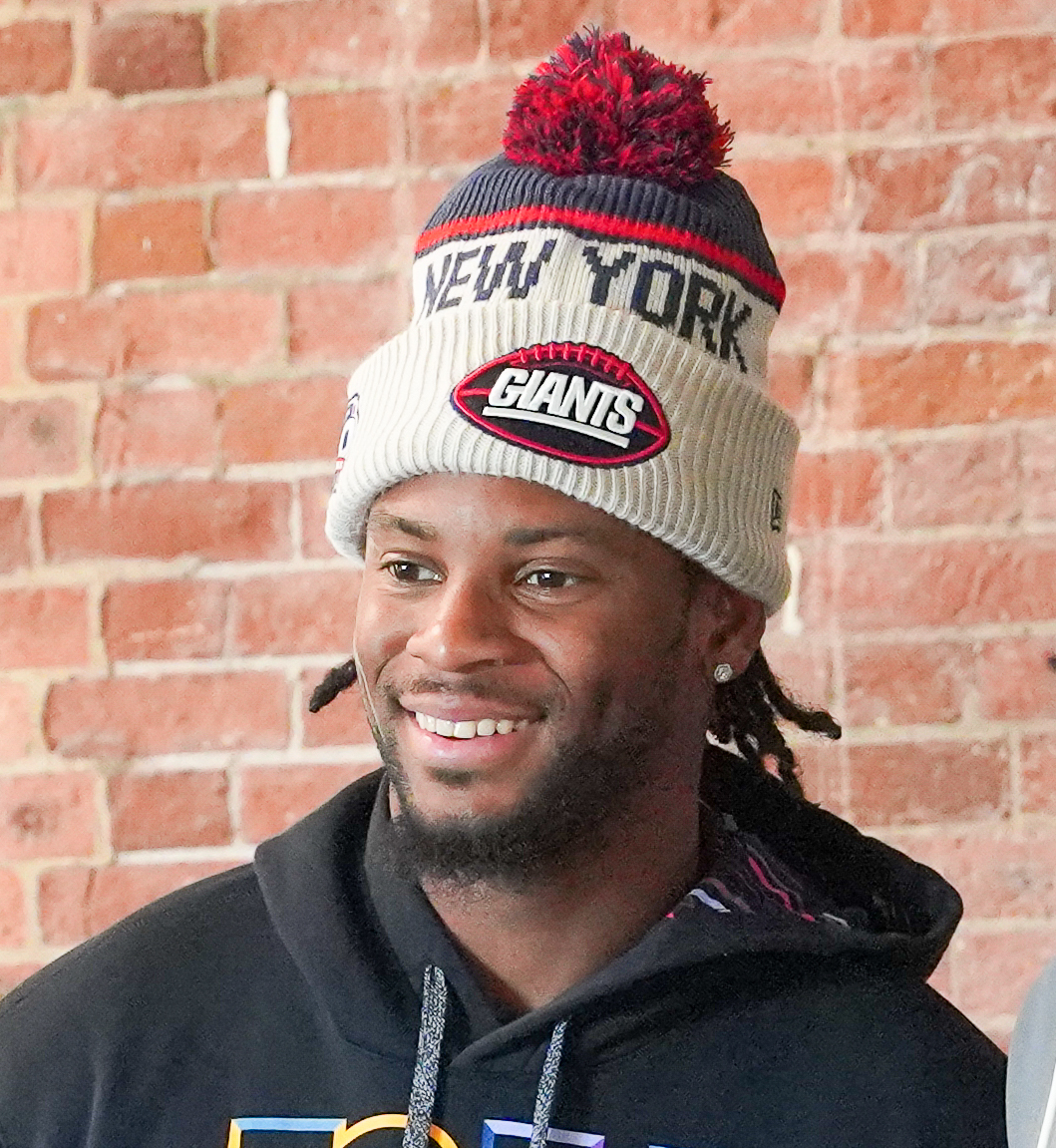
- Smith-Marsette in 2024

Profile
- Positions: Wide receiver, punt returner

Personal information
- Born: August 29, 1999 (age 27); Newark, New Jersey, U.S.
- Listed height: 6 ft 1 in (1.85 m)
- Listed weight: 185 lb (84 kg)

Career information
- High school: Weequahic (Newark)
- College: Iowa (2017–2020)
- NFL draft: 2021: 5th round, 157th overall pick

Career history
- Minnesota Vikings (2021); Chicago Bears (2022); Kansas City Chiefs (2022); Carolina Panthers (2023); New York Giants (2024–2025); Arizona Cardinals (2026)*; Carolina Panthers (2026)*
- * Offseason or practice squad member only

Awards and highlights
- Super Bowl champion (LVII); Big Ten Return Specialist of the Year (2018); First-team All-Big Ten (2018)

Career NFL statistics as of 2025
- Receptions: 14
- Receiving yards: 182
- Receiving touchdowns: 2
- Rushing yards: 73
- Rushing touchdowns: 1
- Return yards: 1,031
- Return touchdowns: 2
- Stats at Pro Football Reference

Ihmir Smith-Marsette (born August 29, 1999) is an American professional football wide receiver and punt returner. He played college football for the Iowa Hawkeyes, and was selected by the Minnesota Vikings in the fifth round of the 2021 NFL draft. He has also played for the Chicago Bears and Kansas City Chiefs.

== Early life ==
Smith-Marsette grew up in Newark, New Jersey. He initially attended St. Benedict's Preparatory School, where he played water polo, before transferring to Weequahic High School after his freshman year. As a senior, Smith-Marsette had 38 receptions for 773 yards and 13 touchdowns on offense and 43 tackles, three interceptions, and two fumble recoveries on defense and also scored three touchdowns as a return specialist. A 3-star recruit, he committed to play college football at Iowa over offers from Boston College, Minnesota, and Rutgers.

== College career ==
Smith-Marsette caught 18 passes for 187 yards and two touchdowns in his freshman season. As a sophomore he had 28 receptions for 361 yards and two touchdowns. As a junior, Smith-Marsette caught 44 passes for 722 yards and five touchdowns while also rushing for 108 yards and three touchdowns and returned 17 kickoffs for 503 yards and two touchdowns. In a shortened schedule during his senior season, Smith-Marsette recorded 25 receptions for 345 yards and 3 touchdowns – with two of those coming in his final college game.

== Professional career ==
Pre-draft measurables
Height	Weight	Arm length	Hand span	Wingspan	40-yard dash	10-yard split	20-yard split	20-yard shuttle	Three-cone drill	Vertical jump	Broad jump	Bench press
6 ft 0 3/4 in (1.85 m)	181 lb (82 kg)	30 3/4 in (0.78 m)	9 3/4 in (0.25 m)	6 ft 2 1/8 in (1.88 m)	4.42 s	1.55 s	2.61 s	4.23 s	7.06 s	37.0 in (0.94 m)	10 ft 4 in (3.15 m)	10 reps
All values from Pro Day

=== Minnesota Vikings ===
Smith-Marsette was drafted by the Minnesota Vikings in the fifth round, 157th overall, of the 2021 NFL draft. He signed his four-year rookie contract on May 13, 2021.

In Week 15 against the Chicago Bears, Smith-Marsette recorded his first career receiving touchdown.

On August 31, 2022, Smith-Marsette was waived by the Vikings after the acquisition of Jalen Reagor.

=== Chicago Bears ===
The Chicago Bears claimed Smith-Marsette off waivers on September 1, 2022. Smith-Marsette was waived on October 18.

=== Kansas City Chiefs ===
On October 21, 2022, Smith-Marsette was signed to the practice squad of the Kansas City Chiefs. He was elevated to the active roster prior to the season finale against the Las Vegas Raiders on January 6, 2023. Smith-Marsette became a Super Bowl champion when the Chiefs won Super Bowl LVII 38–35 against the Philadelphia Eagles. He signed a reserve/future contract on February 15, 2023.

=== Carolina Panthers (first stint) ===
On August 29, 2023, Smith-Marsette was traded to the Carolina Panthers in exchange for a swap of conditional 2025 seventh-rounders. On November 9, 2023, he returned a punt 79 yards for a touchdown, the Panthers' first punt return for a score since 2017.

On March 12, 2024, Smith-Marsette re-signed with the Carolina Panthers under a one-year contract. He was released on August 28.

=== New York Giants ===
On September 9, 2024, Smith-Marsette signed with the New York Giants. In the team's Week 17 win over the Indianapolis Colts, he returned a kick-off 100 yards for a touchdown, earning NFC Special Teams Player of the Week.

On August 26, 2025, Smith-Marsette was released by the Giants as part of final roster cuts and re-signed to the practice squad the next day.

=== Arizona Cardinals ===
On January 14, 2026, Smith-Marsette signed a reserve/futures contract with the Arizona Cardinals. Smith-Marsette was released by the Cardinals as a part of final roster cuts on August 30; he was re-signed to the team's practice squad the following day. He was released by Arizona on September 15.

=== Carolina Panthers (second stint) ===
On September 22, 2026, Smith-Marsette signed with the Carolina Panthers' practice squad. On November 20, he was released with an injury settlement.

== NFL career statistics ==
Legend
	Won the Super Bowl
**Bold**	Career high

=== Regular season ===
Year	Team	Games		Receiving						Rushing					Punt returns					Kickoff returns					Fumbles	
Year	Team	GP	GS	Tgts	Rec	Yds	Avg	Lng	TD	Att	Yds	Avg	Lng	TD	Ret	Yds	Avg	Lng	TD	Ret	Yds	Avg	Lng	TD	Fum	Lost
2021	MIN	8	**1**	6	5	**116**	**23.2**	**44**	**2**	—	—	—	—	—	—	—	—	—	—	4	83	20.8	24	0	0	0
2022	CHI	6	0	4	1	15	15.0	15	0	1	-1	-1.0	-1	0	—	—	—	—	—	1	17	17.0	17	0	1	**1**
2022	KC	2	0	—	—	—	—	—	—	—	—	—	—	—	—	—	—	—	—	—	—	—	—	—	0	0
2023	CAR	**17**	0	**10**	**8**	51	6.4	18	0	**8**	**74**	**9.3**	**20**	**1**	**37**	**322**	**8.7**	**79**	**1**	—	—	—	—	—	**2**	0
2024	NYG	9	0	—	—	—	—	—	—	—	—	—	—	—	29	228	7.9	25	0	**11**	**381**	**34.6**	**100**	1	1	0
Career		42	1	20	14	182	13.0	44	2	9	73	9.1	20	1	56	444	7.9	79	1	11	278	25.3	47	0	4	1

== Legal issues ==
Smith-Marsette was arrested on November 1, 2020, for operating a vehicle while intoxicated. He was suspended from the team for the following game against Michigan State.
