= 2018 Mississippi State Bulldogs football team =

American college football season

2018 Mississippi State Bulldogs football

Outback Bowl, L 22–27 vs. Iowa
- Conference: Southeastern Conference
- Western Division

Ranking
- Coaches: No. 25
- Record: 0–5, 8 wins vacated (0–4 SEC, 4 wins vacated)
- Head coach: Joe Moorhead (1st season)
- Offensive coordinator: Luke Getsy (1st season)
- Offensive scheme: Spread
- Defensive coordinator: Bob Shoop (1st season)
- Base defense: 4–3
- Home stadium: Davis Wade Stadium

2018 Southeastern Conference football standings
	Conf.			Overall
Team	W		L	W		L
Eastern Division
No. T–7 Georgia x	7	–	1	11	–	3
No. 12 Kentucky	5	–	3	10	–	3
No. T–7 Florida	5	–	3	10	–	3
South Carolina	4	–	4	7	–	6
Missouri	4	–	4	8	–	5
Vanderbilt	3	–	5	6	–	7
Tennessee	2	–	6	5	–	7
Western Division
No. 2 Alabama x$^	8	–	0	14	–	1
No. 16 Texas A&M	5	–	3	9	–	4
No. 6 LSU	5	–	3	10	–	3
Mississippi State*	4	–	4	8	–	5
Auburn	3	–	5	8	–	5
Ole Miss	1	–	7	5	–	7
Arkansas	0	–	8	2	–	10
Championship: Alabama 35, Georgia 28
^ – College Football Playoff participant; $ – Conference champion; x – Division champion/co-champions; * Mississippi State vacated four conference and eight total wins due to NCAA violations.; Rankings from AP Poll

The 2018 Mississippi State Bulldogs football team represented Mississippi State University in the 2018 NCAA Division I FBS football season. The Bulldogs played their home games at Davis Wade Stadium in Starkville, Mississippi and competed in the Western Division of the Southeastern Conference (SEC). They were led by first-year head coach Joe Moorhead. Mississippi State subsequently vacated all eight victories due to NCAA sanctions due to academic misconduct involving 10 players and a tutor in online coursework.

== Preseason ==
=== Award watch lists ===
Listed in the order that they were released

Award	Player	Position	Year
Lott Trophy	Jeffery Simmons	DT	JR
Rimington Trophy	Elgton Jenkins	C	SR
Chuck Bednarik Award	Montez Sweat	DE	SR
Chuck Bednarik Award	Jeffery Simmons	DT	JR
Maxwell Award	Nick Fitzgerald	QB	SR
Davey O'Brien Award	Nick Fitzgerald	QB	SR
Doak Walker Award	Aeris Williams	RB	SR
Bronko Nagurski Trophy	Jeffery Simmons	DT	JR
Bronko Nagurski Trophy	Montez Sweat	DE	SR
Outland Trophy	Jeffery Simmons	DT	JR
Lou Groza Award	Jace Christmann	K	SO
Paul Hornung Award	Deddrick Thomas	WR/KR	JR
Wuerffel Trophy	Gerri Green	LB	SR
Ted Hendricks Award	Montez Sweat	DE	SR
Johnny Unitas Golden Arm Award	Nick Fitzgerald	QB	SR
Manning Award	Nick Fitzgerald	QB	SR

=== SEC media poll ===
The SEC media poll was released on July 20, 2018 with the Bulldogs predicted to finish in third place in the West Division.

=== Preseason All-SEC teams ===
The Bulldogs had five players selected to the preseason all-SEC teams.

Offense

3rd team

Nick Fitzgerald – QB

Aeris Williams – RB

Defense

1st team

Montez Sweat – DL

Jeffery Simmons – DL

3rd team

Mark McLaurin – DB

== Schedule ==
All eight victories were subsequently vacated as part of NCAA sanctions due to academic misconduct involving a tutor and online coursework.

Date	Time	Opponent	Rank	Site	TV	Result	Attendance
September 1	6:30 p.m.	Stephen F. Austin*	No. 18	Davis Wade Stadium; Starkville, MS	ESPNU	W 63–6 (vacated)	54,289
September 8	11:00 a.m.	at Kansas State*	No. 18	Bill Snyder Family Stadium; Manhattan, KS	ESPN	W 31–10 (vacated)	49,784
September 15	6:30 p.m.	Louisiana*	No. 16	Davis Wade Stadium; Starkville, MS	ESPN2	W 56–10 (vacated)	56,505
September 22	6:00 p.m.	at Kentucky	No. 14	Kroger Field; Lexington, KY	ESPN2	L 7–28	60,037
September 29	5:00 p.m.	Florida	No. 23	Davis Wade Stadium; Starkville, MS (SEC Nation)	ESPN	L 6–13	61,406
October 6	6:30 p.m.	No. 8 Auburn		Davis Wade Stadium; Starkville, MS	ESPN2	W 23–9 (vacated)	60,635
October 20	6:00 p.m.	at No. 5 LSU	No. 22	Tiger Stadium; Baton Rouge, LA (rivalry)	ESPN	L 3–19	101,340
October 27	6:00 p.m.	No. 16 Texas A&M		Davis Wade Stadium; Starkville, MS	ESPN	W 28–13 (vacated)	57,085
November 3	6:30 p.m.	Louisiana Tech*^{†}	No. 18	Davis Wade Stadium; Starkville, MS	SECN	W 45–3 (vacated)	58,709
November 10	2:30 p.m.	at No. 1 Alabama	No. 16	Bryant–Denny Stadium; Tuscaloosa, AL (rivalry)	CBS	L 0–24	101,821
November 17	11:00 a.m.	Arkansas	No. 21	Davis Wade Stadium; Starkville, MS	ESPN	W 52–6 (vacated)	57,772
November 22	6:30 p.m.	at Ole Miss	No. 18	Vaught–Hemingway Stadium; Oxford, MS (Egg Bowl)	ESPN	W 35–3 (vacated)	56,561
January 1	11:00 a.m.	vs. Iowa*	No. 18	Raymond James Stadium; Tampa, FL (Outback Bowl)	ESPN2	L 22–27	40,518
*Non-conference game; ^{†}Homecoming; Rankings from AP Poll and CFP Rankings after October 30 released prior to game; All times are in Central time

Schedule source:

== Rankings ==
Ranking movements Legend: ██ Increase in ranking ██ Decrease in ranking RV = Received votes
	Week															
Poll	Pre	1	2	3	4	5	6	7	8	9	10	11	12	13	14	Final
AP	18	18	16	14	23	RV	24	22	RV	21	18	25	22	20	18	RV
Coaches	18	18	16	14	19	RV	RV	RV	RV	21	15	23	20	19	18	25
CFP	Not released									18	16	21	18	18	18	Not released

== Game summaries ==
=== Stephen F. Austin ===
	1	2	3	4	Total
Lumberjacks	0	3	3	0	6
No. 18 Bulldogs	21	14	14	14	63

=== At Kansas State ===
	1	2	3	4	Total
No. 18 Bulldogs	3	14	7	7	31
Wildcats	3	0	7	0	10

Mississippi State quarterback Nick Fitzgerald made his first appearance on the football fields since November 2017, when a foot injury sidelined him for the season and a 1-game suspension kept him out of the season opener. Fitzgerald threw for 154 yards with two touchdowns and ran for another 159 yards. Mississippi State compiled a total of 538 yards of total offense where Kansas State only managed 213.

Kansas State continued with its two-quarterback system, switching snaps between Skylar Thompson and Alex Delton. Kansas State running back Alex Barnes managed 75 yards rushing, but the Wildcats fell short to lose the game 31-10.

=== Louisiana ===
Louisiana at Mississippi State

Team	1	2	3	4	Total
Ragin' Cajuns	3	0	0	7	10
• No. 16 Bulldogs	14	21	14	7	56

- Date: September 15, 2018
- Location: Davis Wade Stadium
  Starkville, MS
- Game start: 6:40 p.m. CDT
- Elapsed time: 2 hours and 57 minutes
- Game attendance: 56,505
- Game weather: 86 °F (30 °C) • Weather: Clear Skies • Wind: 6 N MPH
- Referee: Ken Williamson
- Television network: ESPN2

Scoring summary
1	11:48	LA	Kyle Pfau 38-yard field goal (9 plays, 54 yards, 3:12)	LA 3–0
1	05:06	MSST	Nick Fitzgerald 1-yard rush (Jace Christmann kick) (13 plays, 74 yards, 6:36)	MSST 7–3
1	00:10	MSST	Nick Fitzgerald 10-yard rush (Jace Christmann kick) (6 plays, 62 yards, 2:14)	MSST 14–3
2	09:35	MSST	Aeris Williams 3-yard rush (Jace Christmann kick) (7 plays, 67 yards, 4:00)	MSST 21–3
2	04:54	MSST	Nick Fitzgerald 2-yard rush (Jace Christmann kick) (5 plays, 48 yards, 2:16)	MSST 28–3
2	00:18	MSST	Stephen Guidry 39-yard pass from Nick Fitzgerald (Jace Christmann kick) (5 plays, 64 yards, 1:11)	MSST 35–3
3	13:16	MSST	Nick Fitzgerald 26-yard rush (Jace Christmann kick) (4 plays, 65 yards, 1:39)	MSST 42–3
3	06:01	MSST	Keith Mixon 25-yard pass from Nick Fitzgerald (Jace Christmann kick) (9 plays, 85 yards, 3:52)	MSST 49–3
4	07:31	LA	Ja'Marcus Bradley 4-yard pass from Andre Nunez (Kyle Pfau kick) (10 plays, 47 yards, 5:11)	MSST 49–10
4	04:22	MSST	Keytaon Thompson 16-yard rush (Jace Christmann kick) (7 plays, 75 yards, 3:09)	MSST 56–10

Statistics	Louisiana	Mississippi State
First downs	13	29
Total yards	310	607
Rushing yards	65	331
Passing yards	245	276
Turnovers	1	1
Time of possession	27:01	32:59

Team	Category	Player	Statistics
Louisiana	Passing	Andre Nunez	21–29, 224 yards
Louisiana	Rushing	Trey Ragas	7 carries, 49 yards
Louisiana	Receiving	Keenan Barnes	4 receptions, 76 yards
Mississippi State	Passing	Nick Fitzgerald	14–21, 243 yards, 2 TDs
Mississippi State	Rushing	Nick Fitzgerald	15 carries, 107 yards, 4 TDs
Mississippi State	Receiving	Keith Mixon	4 receptions, 80 yards, 1 TD

=== At Kentucky ===
No. 14 Mississippi State at Kentucky

Quarter	1	2	3	4	Total
No. 14 Bulldogs	0	7	0	0	7
Wildcats	0	7	7	14	28

at Kroger Field, Lexington, Kentucky

- Date: September 22, 2018
- Game time: 7:00 p.m. EST
- Game attendance: 60,037
- TV announcers (ESPN2): Beth Mowins (play-by-play), Anthony Becht (analyst), Rocky Boiman (sideline reporter)

=== Florida ===
Florida Gators at Mississippi State Bulldogs – Game summary

Quarter	1	2	3	4	Total
Florida	0	3	7	3	13
No. 23 Mississippi State	3	3	0	0	6

at Davis Wade Stadium • Starkville, Mississippi

- Date: September 29, 2018
- Game time: 6:00 p.m.
- Game weather: Temperature: 79 °F (26 °C) • Wind: N at 1 mile per hour (1.6 km/h) • Weather: Partly cloudy
- Game attendance: 61,406
- Referee: Matt Austin
- TV announcers (ESPN): Dave Pasch, Greg McElroy, Tom Luginbill
- Boxscore

Game information

First Quarter

- Mississippi State – Jace Christmann 34-yard field goal, 3:28

Second Quarter

- Florida – Evan McPherson 39-yard field goal, 10:24
- Mississippi State – Jace Christmann 39-yard field goal, 3:30

Third Quarter

- Florida – Moral Stephens 20-yard pass from Kadarius Toney (Evan McPherson kick), 8:26

Fourth Quarter

- Florida – Evan McPherson 21-yard field goal 5:22

Passing leaders

- FLA – Feleipe Franks – 22/31, 219 yards, 1 interception
- MSU – Nick Fitzgerald – 11/26, 98 yards

Rushing leaders

- FLA – La'Mical Perine – 10 carries, 55 yards
- MSU – Kylin Hill – 9 carries, 41 yards

Receiving leaders

- FLA – Josh Hammond – 3 receptions, 47 yards
- MSU – Osirus Mitchell – 3 receptions, 35 yards

Tackling leaders

- FLA – C. J. Gardner-Johnson and Vosean Joseph – 7 tackles
- MSU – Erroll Thompson – 14 tackles

=== Auburn ===
No. 8 Auburn Tigers at Mississippi State Bulldogs – Game summary

Quarter	1	2	3	4	Total
No. 8 Auburn	3	0	3	3	9
Mississippi State	3	10	3	7	23

at Davis Wade Stadium • Starkville, Mississippi

- Date: October 6, 2018
- Game time: 6:35 p.m.
- Game weather: Temperature: 81° • Wind: SE 3 mph • Weather: Clear skies
- Game attendance: 60,635
- Referee: James Carter
- TV announcers (ESPN2): Mark Jones (play-by-play), Dusty Dvoracek (analyst), Molly McGrath (sideline reporter)

Game information

First Quarter

- AUB – Anders Carlson 47 yd field goal, 7:30 (AUB 3–0)
- MSU – Jace Christmann 25 yd field goal, 2:37 (TIE 3–3)

Second Quarter

- MSU – Jace Christmann 47 yd field goal, 10:13 (MSU 6–3)
- MSU – Nick Fitzgerald 1 yd run (Jace Christmann kick), 0:00 (MSU 13–3)

Third Quarter

- MSU – Jace Christmann 32 yd field goal, 6:55 (MSU 16–3)
- AUB – Anders Carlson 38 yd field goal, 5:45 (MSU 16–6)

Fourth Quarter

- AUB – Anders Carlson 24 yd field goal, 11:24 (MSU 16–9)
- MSU – Nick Fitzgerald 21 yd run (Jace Christmann kick), 2:02 (MSU 23–9)

Top Passers

- AUB – Jarrett Stidham 19–38, 214 yds
- MSU – Nick Fitzgerald 9–17, 69 yds, 1 INT

Top Rushers

- AUB – JaTarvious Whitlow 8 rushes, 88 yds
- MSU – Nick Fitzgerald 28 rushes, 195 yds

Top Receivers

- AUB – Ryan Davis 8 receptions, 91 yds
- MSU – Farrod Green 2 receptions, 23 yds

=== At LSU ===
Mississippi State at LSU – Game summary

Quarter	1	2	3	4	Total
No. 22 Bulldogs	3	0	0	0	3
No. 5 Tigers	7	3	6	3	19

at Tiger Stadium, Baton Rouge, LA

- Date: October 20
- Game time: 6:00 p.m. CST
- Game weather: 77 °F (25 °C); cloudy w/ light rain
- Game attendance: 101,340
- Referee: John McDaid
- TV: ESPN

Game information

First quarter

- LSU – Nick Brossette 1-yard TD run, Cole Tracy kick good, 12:37 (LSU 7–0)
- MSST – Jace Christmann 19-yard field goal, 8:43 (LSU 7–3)

Second quarter

- LSU – Tracy 25-yard field goal, 0:00 (LSU 10–3)

Third quarter

- LSU – Tracy 38-yard field goal, 10:44 (LSU 13–3)
- LSU – Tracy 29-yard field goal, 2:54 (LSU 16–3)

Fourth quarter

- LSU – Tracy 40-yard field goal, 10:42 (LSU 19–3)

Top passers

- LSU – Joe Burrow – 16/28, 129 yards, INT
- MSST – Nick Fitzgerald – 8/24, 59 yards, 4 INT

Top rushers

- LSU – Nick Brossette – 17 carries, 57 yards, TD
- MSST – Nick Fitzgerald – 23 carries, 131 yards

Top receivers

- LSU – Dee Anderson – 3 receptions, 29 yards
- MSST – Deddrick Thomas – reception, 15 yards

=== Texas A&M ===
Week Nine: Texas A&M Aggies at Mississippi State – Game summary

Quarter	1	2	3	4	Total
No. 16 Aggies	0	10	3	0	13
Bulldogs	7	0	7	14	28

at Davis Wade Stadium, Starkville, MS

- Date: October 27
- Game time: 6:00 p.m. CDT
- Game attendance: 57,085
- TV: ESPN

Game information

First quarter
Second quarter
Third quarter
Fourth quarter

Leading Passers

- TAMU – Kellen Mond – 23/46, 232, TD, INT
- MSU – Nick Fitzgerald – 14/22, 241 yards, 2 TD

Leading Rushers

- TAMU – Jashaun Corbin – 3 carries, 33 yards
- MSU – Nick Fitzgerald – 16 carries, 88 yards, 2 TD

Leading Receivers

- TAMU – Quartney Davis – 6 receptions, 59 yards, TD
- MSU – Stephen Guidry – 3 receptions, 130 yards, TD

=== Louisiana Tech ===
Louisiana Tech at Mississippi State – Game summary

Quarter	1	2	3	4	Total
LT Bulldogs	3	0	0	0	3
No. 21 MSU Bulldogs	21	10	7	7	45

at Davis Wade Stadium, Starkville, MS

- Date: November 3
- Game time: 6:30 p.m. CST
- Game weather: 61 °F (16 °C); clear
- Game attendance: 58,709
- TV: SEC Network

Game information

First quarter

- MSST - Stephen Guidry 11-yard TD pass from Nick Fitzgerald, Jace Christmann kick good, 12:38 (MSST 7-0)
- MSST - Deddrick Thomas 36-yard TD pass from Fitzgerald, Christmann kick good, 7:02 (MSST 14-0)
- LT - Bailey Hale 46-yard field goal, 3:15 (MSST 14-3)
- MSST - Kylin Hill 23-yard TD pass from Fitzgerald, Christmann kick good, 0:07 (MSST 21-3)

Second quarter

- MSST - Christmann 47-yard field goal, 5:23 (MSST 24-3)
- MSST - Jesse Jackson 10-yard TD pass from Fitzgerald, Christmann kick good, 0:30 (MSST 31-3)

Third quarter

- MSST - Aeris Williams 29-yard TD run, Christmann kick good, 4:12 (MSST 38-3)

Fourth quarter

- MSST - Keytaon Thompson 19-yard TD run, Christmann kick good, 13:20 (MSST 45-3)

Top passers

- MSST - Nick Fitzgerald - 17/28, 243 yards, 4 TD
- LT - J'Mar Smith - 14/30, 98 yards

Top rushers

- MSST - Nick Fitzgerald - 18 carries, 107 yards
- LT - Kam McKnight - 13 carries, 59 yards

Top receivers

- MSST - Deddrick Thomas - 3 receptions, 70 yards, TD
- LT - Kam McKnight - 2 receptions, 32 yards

=== At Alabama ===
Team	1	2	3	4	Total
No. 18 Mississippi State	0	0	0	0	0
• No. 1 Alabama	14	7	0	3	24

- Date: November 10
- Location: Tuscaloosa, AL
- Game start: 2:50 p.m.
- Game attendance: 101,821
- Game weather: 50, Clear, Sunny, Wind N @ 9 mph
- Referee: Ken Williamson
- TV announcers (CBS): Brad Nessler (play-by-play), Gary Danielson (color), Jamie Erdahl (sideline)

Scoring summary
Q1
Q2
Q3
Q4

Statistics

Statistics	Mississippi State	Alabama
First downs	6	23
Total yards	169	305
Rushes–yards	30–44	45–142
Passing yards	125	163
Passing: Comp–Att–Int	11–20–0	17–27–1
Time of possession	26:05	33:55

Team	Category	Player	Statistics
Mississippi State	Passing	Nick Fitzgerald	11–20, 125 yards
Mississippi State	Rushing	Kylin Hill	7 carries, 47 yards
Mississippi State	Receiving	Deddrick Thomas	2 receptions, 25 yards
Alabama	Passing	Tua Tagovailoa	14–21, 164 yards, 1 TD, 1 INT
Alabama	Rushing	Josh Jacobs	20 carries, 97 yards, 1 TD
Alabama	Receiving	Jerry Jeudy	6 receptions, 45 yards

=== Arkansas ===
Game Eleven – Arkansas Razorbacks (2–8) at Mississippi State Bulldogs (6–4)

Quarter	1	2	3	4	Total
Razorbacks	0	3	3	0	6
No. 25 Bulldogs	3	14	21	14	52

at Davis Wade Stadium • Starkville, Mississippi

- Date: Saturday, November 17, 2018
- Game time: 11:00 a.m. CST
- Game weather: Clear • Temperature: 59 °F (15 °C) • Wind: SSE 2 mph
- Game attendance: 57,772
- Referee: Matt Loeffler (SEC)
- TV announcers (ESPN): Adam Amin (play-by-play), Rod Gilmore (color), Quint Kessenich (sideline)

Game information

First Quarter

- (8:27) MSST – Jace Christmann 19 yard FG
  Mississippi State 3–0; 14 plays, 81 yards, 6:33

Second Quarter

- (10:28) MSST – Nick Fitzgerald 2 yard rush, Jace Christmann kick
  Mississippi State 10–0; 11 plays, 53 yards, 4:53
- (5:20) MSST – Nick Gibson 8 yard rush, Jace Christmann kick
  Mississippi State 17–0; 8 plays, 72 yards, 4:11
- (0:32) ARK – Connor Limpert 36 yard FG
  Mississippi State 17–3; 13 plays, 52 yards, 2:48

Third Quarter

- (11:19) ARK – Connor Limpert 32 yard FG
  Mississippi State 17–6; 7 plays, 60 yards, 3:35
- (8:42) MSST – Justin Johnson 34 yard pass from Nick Fitzgerald, Jace Christmann kick
  Mississippi State 24–6; 6 plays, 75 yards, 2:37
- (7:41) MSST – Keith Mixon 4 yard pass from Nick Fitzgerald, Jace Christmann kick
  Mississippi State 31–6; 1 play, 4 yards, 0:04
- (3:02) MSST – Osirus Mitchell 15 yard pass from Nick Fitzgerald, Jordan Lawless kick
  Mississippi State 38–6; 3 plays, 58 yards, 1:17

Fourth Quarter

- (13:04) MSST – Austin Williams 19 yard pass from Nick Fitzgerald, Jordan Lawless kick
  Mississippi State 45–6; 6 plays, 50 yards, 3:02
- (5:20) MSST – Austin Williams 33 yard pass from Keytaon Thompson, Jordan Lawless kick
  Mississippi State 52–6; 8 plays, 72 yards, 4:01

Top Passers

- ARK – Ty Storey: 16/27, 137 yards, 1 INT
- MSST – Nick Fitzgerald: 9/14, 127 yards, 4 TD

Top Rushers

- ARK – Rakeem Boyd: 14 carries, 84 yards
- MSST – Aeris Williams: 15 carries, 104 yards

Top Receivers

- ARK – La'Michael Pettway: 4 receptions, 85 yards
- MSST – Justin Johnson: 3 receptions, 59 yards, 1 TD

=== At Ole Miss ===
No. 22 Mississippi State Bulldogs (7–4) at Ole Miss Rebels (5–6)

Quarter	1	2	3	4	Total
No. 22 Bulldogs	7	14	7	7	35
Rebels	0	3	0	0	3

at Vaught-Hemingway Stadium • Oxford, Mississippi

- Date: Thursday, November 22, 2018
- Game time: 6:30 p.m. CDT
- Game weather: Clear • 46 °F (8 °C) • Wind —
- Game attendance: 56,561
- Referee: James Carter
- TV announcers (ESPN): Dave Flemming and Greg McElroy

Game information

First Quarter

- (5:02) MSST - Kylin Hill 6 yard rush, Jace Christmann kick
  Mississippi State 7-0; 7 plays, 30 yards, 3:02

Second Quarter

- (14:04) MSST - Nick Fitzgerald 8 yard rush, Jace Christmann kick
  Mississippi State 14-0; 8 plays, 86 yards, 3:30
- (6:46) MISS - Luke Logan 32 yard FG
  Mississippi State 14-3; 10 plays, 51 yards, 3:54
- (0:25) MSST - Deddrick Thomas 9 yard pass from Nick Fitzgerald, Jace Christmann kick
  Mississippi State 21-3; 8 plays, 92 yards, 3:03

Third Quarter

- (10:42) MSST - Nick Fitzgerald 9 yard rush, Jace Christmann kick
  Mississippi State 28-3; 3 plays, 19 yards, 1:40

Fourth Quarter

- (7:21) MSST - Aeris Williams 1 yard rush, Jace Christmann kick
  Mississippi State 35-3; 11 plays, 89 yards, 5:46

Top Passers

- MSST – Nick Fitzgerald: 11/18, 111 yards, 1 TD
- MISS – Jordan Ta'amu: 8/17, 87 yards, 1 INT

Top Rushers

- MSST – Nick Fitzgerald: 18 carries, 117 yards, 2 TD
- MISS – Isaiah Woullard: 11 carries, 63 yards

Top Receivers

- MSST – Jesse Jackson: 2 receptions, 31 yards
- MISS – A. J. Brown: 4 receptions, 61 yards

=== Vs. Iowa (Outback Bowl) ===
No. 18 Mississippi State vs. Iowa
Outback Bowl

Team	1	2	3	4	Total
No. 18 Bulldogs	6	0	13	3	22
• Hawkeyes	0	17	7	3	27

- Date: January 1
- Location:
  Raymond James Stadium
  Tampa, FL
- Game start: 12:00 p.m. EST
- Elapsed time: 3:25
- Game attendance: 40,518
- Referee: Chris Coyte
- TV announcers (ESPN2): Mark Jones, Dusty Dvoracek, and Molly McGrath
- Source: Box Score

Scoring summary
1	6:37	MSU	Jace Christmann 44-yard field goal	MSU 3–0
1	0:45	MSU	Jace Christmann 42-yard field goal	MSU 6–0
2	10:02	Iowa	Miguel Recinos 44-yard field goal	MSU 6–3
2	7:55	Iowa	Nick Easley 75-yard pass from Nate Stanley (Miguel Recinos kick)	Iowa 10–6
2	6:18	Iowa	Ihmir Smith-Marsette 15-yard pass from Nate Stanley (Miguel Recinos kick)	Iowa 17–6
3	11:26	MSU	Kylin Hill 1-yard pass from Nick Fitzgerald (conversion failed)	Iowa 17–12
3	11:08	MSU	Nick Fitzgerald 33-yard run (Jace Christmann kick)	MSU 19–17
3	1:55	Iowa	Nick Easley 8-yard pass from Nate Stanley (Miguel Recinos kick)	Iowa 24–19
4	12:04	MSU	Jace Christmann 20-yard field goal	Iowa 24–22
4	5:51	Iowa	Miguel Recinos 40-yard field goal	Iowa 27–22

In a back-and-forth game, Iowa held on to defeat SEC opponent Mississippi State. Senior Jake Gervase made a critical interception in the end zone, and batted down a fourth down pass to end the Bulldogs' hopes. The victory was Ferentz's fifth January bowl win and eighth overall bowl victory.

Statistics	MS	IOWA
First downs	15	11
Total yards	342	199
Rushing yards	190	–15
Passing yards	152	214
Turnovers	3	2
Time of possession	33:34	26:26

Team	Category	Player	Statistics
Mississippi State	Passing	Nick Fitzgerald	14/32, 152 yards, TD, 2 INT
Mississippi State	Rushing	Nick Fitzgerald	20 carries, 103 yards, TD
Mississippi State	Receiving	Aeris Williams	3 receptions, 19 yards
Iowa	Passing	Nate Stanley	21/31, 214 yards, 3 TD, INT
Iowa	Rushing	Toren Young	3 carries, 7 yards
Iowa	Receiving	Nick Easley	8 receptions, 104 yards, 2 TD

== Players drafted into the NFL ==
Round	Pick	Player	Position	NFL Club
1	19	Jeffery Simmons	DT	Tennessee Titans
1	26	Montez Sweat	DE	Washington Redskins
1	27	Johnathan Abram	S	Oakland Raiders
2	44	Elgton Jenkins	C	Green Bay Packers
6	199	Gerri Green	LB	Indianapolis Colts
