= Easley =

Easley may refer to:

== Places in the United States ==
- Easley, Alabama, in Blount County
- Easley, Iowa
- Easley, Missouri
- Easley, South Carolina

== Other uses ==
- Easley (name)
- Easley McCain Recording
- Justice Easley (disambiguation)

== See also ==
- Easly, West Virginia, U.S.
- Easily (disambiguation)
