= 2019 Outback Bowl =

College football bowl game

- 33rd Outback Bowl
Mississippi State Bulldogs	Iowa Hawkeyes
(8–4)	(8–4)
SEC	Big Ten
22	27
Head coach: Joe Moorhead	Head coach: Kirk Ferentz
AP / Coaches / CFP; 18 / 18 / 18
	1	2	3	4	Total
Mississippi State	6	0	13	3	22
Iowa	0	17	7	3	27
- Date: January 1, 2019
- Season: 2018
- Stadium: Raymond James Stadium
- Location: Tampa, Florida
- MVP: Nick Easley (WR, Iowa)
- Favorite: Mississippi State by 6.5
- Referee: Chris Coyte (Pac-12)
- Attendance: 40,518
- Payout: US$6,350,000

United States TV coverage
- Network: ESPN2
- Announcers: Mark Jones, Dusty Dvoracek and Molly McGrath

The 2019 Outback Bowl was a college football bowl game played on January 1, 2019. It was the 33rd edition of the Outback Bowl, and one of the 2018–19 bowl games concluding the 2018 FBS football season. The game was sponsored by Outback Steakhouse and played at Raymond James Stadium in Tampa, Florida.

== Teams ==
The game featured the Iowa Hawkeyes of the Big Ten Conference and the Mississippi State Bulldogs of the Southeastern Conference. It was the first meeting between the two teams. It was Iowa's sixth time playing in the Outback Bowl, and Mississippi State's first.

=== Iowa Hawkeyes ===
Iowa received and accepted a bid to the Outback Bowl on December 2. The Hawkeyes entered the bowl with an 8–4 record (5–4 in conference).

It marked the sixth time in Kirk Ferentz's tenure as the Hawkeyes' head coach the team played in the Outback Bowl.

=== Mississippi State Bulldogs ===
Mississippi State received and accepted a bid to the Outback Bowl on December 2. The Bulldogs entered the bowl with an 8–4 record (4–4 in conference).

== Game summary ==
=== Scoring summary ===
Scoring summary

Quarter	Time	Drive			Team	Scoring information	Score	
Quarter	Time	Plays	Yards	TOP	Team	Scoring information	MSST	IOWA
1	6:37	10	39	4:50	MSST	44-yard field goal by Jace Christmann	3	0
1	0:45	9	23	3:54	MSST	42-yard field goal by Jace Christmann	6	0
2	10:02	10	49	5:43	IOWA	44-yard field goal by Miguel Recinos	6	3
2	7:55	1	75	0:11	IOWA	Nick Easley 75-yard touchdown reception from Nate Stanley, Miguel Recinos kick good	6	10
2	6:18	2	13	0:42	IOWA	Ihmir Smith-Marsette 15-yard touchdown reception from Nate Stanley, Miguel Recinos kick good	6	17
3	11:26	3	6	1:12	MSST	Kylin Hill 1-yard touchdown reception from Nick Fitzgerald, 2-point pass failed	12	17
3	11:08	1	33	0:12	MSST	Nick Fitzgerald 33-yard touchdown run, Jace Christmann kick good	19	17
3	1:55	6	32	2:44	IOWA	Nick Easley 8-yard touchdown reception from Nate Stanley, Miguel Recinos kick good	19	24
4	12:04	5	49	2:40	MSST	20-yard field goal by Jace Christmann	22	24
4	5:51	6	50	2:51	IOWA	40-yard field goal by Miguel Recinos	22	27
"TOP" = time of possession. For other American football terms, see Glossary of American football.							22	27

=== Statistics ===
	1	2	3	4	Total
No. 18 Bulldogs	6	0	13	3	22
Hawkeyes	0	17	7	3	27

Statistics	MSST	IOWA
First downs	15	11
Plays–yards	74–342	51–199
Rushes–yards	42–190	20–(–15)
Passing yards	152	214
Passing: comp–att–int	14–32–2	21–31–1
Time of possession	33:34	26:26

Team	Category	Player	Statistics
Mississippi State	Passing	Nick Fitzgerald	14/32, 152 yds, 1 TD, 2 INT
Mississippi State	Rushing	Nick Fitzgerald	20 car, 103 yds, 1 TD
Mississippi State	Receiving	Stephen Guidry	1 rec, 51 yds
Iowa	Passing	Nate Stanley	21/31, 214 yds, 3 TD, 1 INT
Iowa	Rushing	Toren Young	3 car, 7 yds
Iowa	Receiving	Nick Easley	8 rec, 104 yds, 2 TD
