= 2017 Pinstripe Bowl =

2017 New Era Pinstripe Bowl
- 8th Pinstripe Bowl
Iowa Hawkeyes	Boston College Eagles
(7–5)	(7–5)
Big Ten	ACC
27	20
Head coach: Kirk Ferentz	Head coach: Steve Addazio
	1	2	3	4	Total
Iowa	3	7	7	10	27
Boston College	7	10	0	3	20
- Date: December 27, 2017
- Season: 2017
- Stadium: Yankee Stadium
- Location: Bronx, New York, United States
- MVP: Akrum Wadley (RB, Iowa)
- Referee: Terry Leyden (Pac-12)
- Attendance: 37,667
- Payout: US$4,100,000

United States TV coverage
- Network: ESPN
- Announcers: TV: Kevin Negandhi, Mack Brown, Booger McFarland, Jen Lada; Radio: Kevin Winter, Jack Ford, Paul Carcaterra

The 2017 Pinstripe Bowl was a bowl game, a post-season American college football event that was played on December 27, 2017, at Yankee Stadium in the New York City borough of the Bronx. The eighth edition of the Pinstripe Bowl featured the Iowa Hawkeyes of the Big Ten Conference against the Boston College Eagles of the Atlantic Coast Conference. It was one of the 2017–18 bowl games concluding the 2017 FBS football season. Sponsored by the New Era Cap Company, the game was officially known as the New Era Pinstripe Bowl.

The contest was televised on ESPN, with kickoff at 5:15 p.m. (EST)

== Team selection ==
The game featured the Iowa Hawkeyes against the Boston College Eagles, the first meeting between the two. It was Boston College's second appearance in this bowl in four years and the first Pinstripe Bowl for Iowa. .

== Game summary ==
=== Scoring summary ===
Scoring summary

Quarter	Time	Drive			Team	Scoring information	Score	
Quarter	Time	Plays	Yards	TOP	Team	Scoring information	Iowa	BC
1	12:59	4	0	0:55	Iowa	24-yard field goal by Miguel Recinos	3	0
1	0:05	14	62	5:57	BC	A. J. Dillon 4-yard touchdown run, Colton Lichtenburg kick good	3	7
2	13:18	4	16	1:47	Iowa	Noah Fant 8-yard touchdown reception from Nate Stanley, Miguel Recinos kick good	10	7
2	9:35	7	69	3:43	BC	Tommy Sweeney 39-yard touchdown reception from Darius Wade, Colton Lichtenburg kick good	10	14
2	1:29	7	84	3:30	BC	30-yard field goal by Colton Lichtenburg	10	17
3	7:11	7	58	3:31	Iowa	Akrum Wadley 5-yard touchdown run, Miguel Recinos kick good	17	17
4	11:32	10	55	4:38	Iowa	38-yard field goal by Miguel Recinos	20	17
4	8:09	7	55	3:23	BC	24-yard field goal by Colton Lichtenburg	20	20
4	3:09	3	45	1:13	Iowa	Drake Kulick 1-yard touchdown run, Miguel Recinos kick good	27	20
"TOP" = time of possession. For other American football terms, see Glossary of American football.							27	20

=== Statistics ===
	1	2	3	4	Total
Hawkeyes	3	7	7	10	27
Eagles	7	10	0	3	20

Statistics	Iowa	BC
First downs	13	16
Plays–yards	54–200	70–383
Rushes–yards	39–101	43–175
Passing yards	99	208
Passing: Comp–Att–Int	8–15–0	16–27–2
Time of possession	27:25	32:35

Team	Category	Player	Statistics
Iowa	Passing	Nate Stanley	8/15, 99 yds, 1 TD
Iowa	Rushing	Akrum Wadley	22 car, 88 yds, 1 TD
Iowa	Receiving	Nick Easley	1 rec, 32 yds
BC	Passing	Darius Wade	16/27, 208 yds, 1 TD, 2 INT
BC	Rushing	A. J. Dillon	32 car, 157 yds, 1 TD
BC	Receiving	Tommy Sweeney	7 rec, 137 yds, 1 TD
