= Easley (name) =

Easley is both an English surname and a masculine given name. Notable people with the name include:

Surname:

- Adelaide Easley (1902–1974), American physicist with General Electric
- Annie Easley (1933–2011), American computer scientist, mathematician and rocket scientist
- Charles Easley, Justice, Mississippi Supreme Court
- Damion Easley (born 1969), baseball player
- David Easley, Chair of the Economics department at Cornell University
- Ed Easley (born 1985), American baseball player
- Jeff Easley (born 1954), graphic artist, works in Dungeons and Dragons books
- Kenny Easley (1959–2025), American football player
- Michael Easley (disambiguation), multiple people
- Mike Easley (born 1950), politician
- Nick Easley (born 1997), American football player
- Stephen Easley (1952–2013), American businessman and politician
- Walt Easley (1957–2013), American football player

Given name:

- Easley Blackwood Sr. (1903–1992), American contract bridge player, administrator and author
- Easley Blackwood Jr. (1933–2023), American musician
