= 2017 Iowa Hawkeyes football team =

American college football season

2017 Iowa Hawkeyes football

Pinstripe Bowl champion

Pinstripe Bowl, W 27–20 vs. Boston College
- Conference: Big Ten Conference
- West Division
- Record: 8–5 (4–5 Big Ten)
- Head coach: Kirk Ferentz (19th season)
- Offensive coordinator: Brian Ferentz (1st season)
- Offensive scheme: Multiple
- Defensive coordinator: Phil Parker (6th season)
- Base defense: 4–3
- Home stadium: Kinnick Stadium

2017 Big Ten Conference football standings
	Conf.			Overall
Team	W		L	W		L
East Division
No. 5 Ohio State xy$	8	–	1	12	–	2
No. 15 Michigan State	7	–	2	10	–	3
No. 8 Penn State	7	–	2	11	–	2
Michigan	5	–	4	8	–	5
Rutgers	3	–	6	4	–	8
Indiana	2	–	7	5	–	7
Maryland	2	–	7	4	–	8
West Division
No. 7 Wisconsin xy	9	–	0	13	–	1
No. 17 Northwestern	7	–	2	10	–	3
Iowa	4	–	5	8	–	5
Purdue	4	–	5	7	–	6
Nebraska	3	–	6	4	–	8
Minnesota	2	–	7	5	–	7
Illinois	0	–	9	2	–	10
Championship: Ohio State 27, Wisconsin 21
$ – Conference champion; x – Division champion/co-champions; y – Championship game participant; Rankings from AP Poll

The 2017 Iowa Hawkeyes football team represented the University of Iowa in the 2017 NCAA Division I FBS football season. The Hawkeyes, led by 19th-year head coach Kirk Ferentz, were members of the West Division of the Big Ten Conference and played their home games at Kinnick Stadium in Iowa City, Iowa. They finished the season 8–5, 4–5 in Big Ten play to finish in a tie for third place in the West Division. They received an invite to the Pinstripe Bowl where they defeated Boston College.

The Iowa football program was awarded Disney's Wide World of Sports Spirit Award for the Kinnick Wave, a new tradition that began during the season, where, at the end of the first quarter of every home game everyone in the stadium turned and waved to the young patients watching from the Stead Family Children's Hospital, which overlooks Kinnick Stadium. This season marked the first time since 1980 that the Tigerhawk logo was displayed at midfield in Kinnick Stadium.

== Offseason ==
=== Recruiting ===
==== Position key ====
Back	B	Center	C	Cornerback	CB	Defensive back	DB
Defensive end	DE	Defensive lineman	DL	Defensive tackle	DT	End	E
Fullback	FB	Guard	G	Halfback	HB	Kicker	K
Kickoff returner	KR	Offensive tackle	OT	Offensive lineman	OL	Linebacker	LB
Long snapper	LS	Punter	P	Punt returner	PR	Quarterback	QB
Running back	RB	Safety	S	Tight end	TE	Wide receiver	WR

==== 2017 commitments ====
The Hawkeyes signed a total of 22 recruits.

College recruiting (2017)
Name	Hometown	School	Height	Weight	Commit date
Coy Kirkpatrick; DE	Madrid, Iowa	Madrid HS	6 ft 4 in (1.93 m)	240 lb (110 kg)	Jun 8, 2015
Coy Kirkpatrick; DE	Recruit ratings: Scout: Rivals: 247Sports: ESPN:				
Tristan Wirfs; OT	Mount Vernon, Iowa	Mount Vernon HS	6 ft 5 in (1.96 m)	290 lb (130 kg)	Dec 7, 2015
Tristan Wirfs; OT	Recruit ratings: Scout: Rivals: 247Sports: ESPN:				
Jacob Coons; TE	Solon, Iowa	Solon HS	6 ft 3 in (1.91 m)	215 lb (98 kg)	Dec 12, 2015
Jacob Coons; TE	Recruit ratings: Scout: Rivals: 247Sports: ESPN:				
A. J. Epenesa; DE	Edwardsville, Illinois	Edwardsville HS	6 ft 5 in (1.96 m)	260 lb (120 kg)	Jan 17, 2016
A. J. Epenesa; DE	Recruit ratings: Scout: Rivals: 247Sports: ESPN:				
Djimon Colbert; CB	Mission, Kansas	Bishop Miege HS	6 ft 0 in (1.83 m)	210 lb (95 kg)	Mar 6, 2016
Djimon Colbert; CB	Recruit ratings: Scout: Rivals: 247Sports: ESPN:				
Mark Kallenberger; OT	Bettendorf, Iowa	Bettendrof HS	6 ft 6 in (1.98 m)	250 lb (110 kg)	Mar 31, 2016
Mark Kallenberger; OT	Recruit ratings: Scout: Rivals: 247Sports: ESPN:				
Ivory Kelly-Martin; RB	Oswego, Illinois	Oswego East HS	5 ft 11 in (1.80 m)	195 lb (88 kg)	Apr 4, 2016
Ivory Kelly-Martin; RB	Recruit ratings: Scout: Rivals: 247Sports: ESPN:				
Levi Duwa; DE	Wellman, Iowa	Mid-Prairie Community HS	6 ft 3 in (1.91 m)	230 lb (100 kg)	Apr 24, 2016
Levi Duwa; DE	Recruit ratings: Scout: Rivals: 247Sports: ESPN:				
Peyton Mansell; QB	Belton, Texas	Belton HS	6 ft 2 in (1.88 m)	189 lb (86 kg)	Jun 20, 2016
Peyton Mansell; QB	Recruit ratings: Scout: Rivals: 247Sports: ESPN:				
Brandon Smith; WR	Lake Cormorant, Mississippi	Lake Cormorant HS	6 ft 3 in (1.91 m)	205 lb (93 kg)	Jun 26, 2016
Brandon Smith; WR	Recruit ratings: Scout: Rivals: 247Sports: ESPN:				
Camron Harrell; S	Bradley, Illinois	Brady-Bourbonnais HS	5 ft 11 in (1.80 m)	180 lb (82 kg)	Jun 26, 2016
Camron Harrell; S	Recruit ratings: Scout: Rivals: 247Sports: ESPN:				
Matt Hankins; CB	Flower Mound, Texas	Marcus HS	6 ft 0 in (1.83 m)	158 lb (72 kg)	Jun 27, 2016
Matt Hankins; CB	Recruit ratings: Scout: Rivals: 247Sports: ESPN:				
Joshua Turner; CB	Delray Beach, Florida	American Heritage HS	6 ft 0 in (1.83 m)	175 lb (79 kg)	Aug 11, 2016
Joshua Turner; CB	Recruit ratings: Scout: Rivals: 247Sports: ESPN:				
Max Cooper; WR	Waukesha, Wisconsin	Catholic Memorial HS	6 ft 0 in (1.83 m)	174 lb (79 kg)	Dec 14, 2016
Max Cooper; WR	Recruit ratings: Scout: Rivals: 247Sports: ESPN:				
Henry Marchese; WR	Lincolnshire, Illinois	Stevenson HS	6 ft 3 in (1.91 m)	185 lb (84 kg)	Jan 24, 2017
Henry Marchese; WR	Recruit ratings: Scout: Rivals: 247Sports: ESPN:				
Nate Wieland; LB	Iowa City, Iowa	Iowa City HS	6 ft 3 in (1.91 m)	195 lb (88 kg)	Jan 30, 2017
Nate Wieland; LB	Recruit ratings: Scout: Rivals: 247Sports: ESPN:				
Trey Creamer; CB	Cartersville, Georgia	Cartersville HS	6 ft 0 in (1.83 m)	170 lb (77 kg)	Jan 30, 2017
Trey Creamer; CB	Recruit ratings: Scout: Rivals: 247Sports: ESPN:				
Kyshaun Bryan; RB	Fort Lauderdale, Florida	St. Thomas Aquinas HS	5 ft 10 in (1.78 m)	190 lb (86 kg)	Jan 30, 2017
Kyshaun Bryan; RB	Recruit ratings: Scout: Rivals: 247Sports: ESPN:				
Geno Stone; S	New Castle, Pennsylvania	New Castle HS	5 ft 11 in (1.80 m)	190 lb (86 kg)	Jan 31, 2017
Geno Stone; S	Recruit ratings: Scout: Rivals: 247Sports: ESPN:				
Ryan Gersonde; P	Milwaukee, Wisconsin	Marquette University HS	6 ft 4 in (1.93 m)	180 lb (82 kg)	Jan 31, 2017
Ryan Gersonde; P	Recruit ratings: Scout: Rivals: 247Sports: ESPN:				
Ihmir Smith-Marsette; CB	Newark, New Jersey	Weequahic HS	6 ft 1 in (1.85 m)	155 lb (70 kg)	Feb 1, 2017
Ihmir Smith-Marsette; CB	Recruit ratings: Scout: Rivals: 247Sports: ESPN:				
Daviyon Nixon; DE	Kenosha, Wisconsin	Indian Trail Academy	6 ft 4 in (1.93 m)	285 lb (129 kg)	Feb 1, 2017
Daviyon Nixon; DE	Recruit ratings: Scout: Rivals: 247Sports: ESPN:				
Overall recruit ranking:
Note: In many cases, Scout, Rivals, 247Sports, On3, and ESPN may conflict in their listings of height and weight.; In these cases, the average was taken. ESPN grades are on a 100-point scale.; Sources: "Iowa Football Commitments". Rivals.; "2017 Iowa Football Commits". Scout.; "ESPN". ESPN.; "Scout.com Team Recruiting Rankings". Scout.; "2017 Team Ranking". Rivals.com.

== Schedule ==
Iowa announced its 2017 football schedule on July 11, 2013. The 2017 schedule consisted of seven home and five away games in the regular season. The Hawkeyes hosted Big Ten foes Illinois, Minnesota, Ohio State, Penn State, and Purdue, and traveled to Michigan State, Nebraska, Northwestern, and Wisconsin.

The team hosted two non–conference games against the Wyoming Cowboys from the Mountain West Conference and the North Texas Mean Green from Conference USA. Sandwiched between those matchups was a trip to Ames for the annual Cy-Hawk rivalry game against the Iowa State Cyclones from the Big 12 Conference.

Date	Time	Opponent	Rank	Site	TV	Result	Attendance
September 2	11:00 a.m.	Wyoming*		Kinnick Stadium; Iowa City, IA	BTN	W 24–3	68,075
September 9	11:00 a.m.	at Iowa State*		Jack Trice Stadium; Ames, IA (Cy-Hawk Trophy)	ESPN2	W 44–41 ^{OT}	61,500
September 16	2:30 p.m.	North Texas*		Kinnick Stadium; Iowa City, IA	ESPN2	W 31–14	65,668
September 23	6:30 p.m.	No. 4 Penn State		Kinnick Stadium; Iowa City, IA	ABC	L 19–21	66,205
September 30	3:00 p.m.	at Michigan State		Spartan Stadium; East Lansing, MI	FOX	L 10–17	73,331
October 7	11:00 a.m.	Illinois^{†}		Kinnick Stadium; Iowa City, IA	BTN	W 45–16	69,894
October 21	11:00 a.m.	at Northwestern		Ryan Field; Evanston, IL	ESPN2	L 10–17 ^{OT}	40,036
October 28	5:30 p.m.	Minnesota		Kinnick Stadium; Iowa City, IA (Floyd of Rosedale)	FS1	W 17–10	66,292
November 4	2:30 p.m.	No. 6 Ohio State		Kinnick Stadium; Iowa City, IA	ESPN	W 55–24	67,669
November 11	2:30 p.m.	at No. 8 Wisconsin	No. 20	Camp Randall Stadium; Madison, WI (Heartland Trophy)	ABC	L 14–38	80,462
November 18	2:30 p.m.	Purdue		Kinnick Stadium; Iowa City, IA	BTN	L 15–24	60,554
November 24	3:00 p.m.	at Nebraska		Memorial Stadium; Lincoln, NE (Heroes Trophy)	FS1	W 56–14	90,046
December 27	4:15 p.m.	vs. Boston College*		Yankee Stadium; New York, NY (Pinstripe Bowl)	ESPN	W 27–20	37,667
*Non-conference game; ^{†}Homecoming; Rankings from AP Poll and CFP Rankings after October 31 released prior to game; All times are in Central time

== Roster ==
2017 Iowa Hawkeyes football team roster
Players
Coaches
Offense

Pos.	#	Name	Class
QB	11	Ryan Boyle	So
QB	2	Peyton Mansell	Fr
QB	15	Ryan Schmidt	So
QB	4	Nate Stanley	So
QB	8	Tyler Wiegers	Jr
RB	22	Toks Akinribade	So
RB	47	Lane Akre	So
RB	16	Kyshaun Bryan	Fr
RB	20	James Butler	Sr
RB	21	Sam Cook	Fr
RB	26	Marcel Joly	Jr
RB	33	Austin Kelly	Jr
RB	21	Ivory Kelly-Martin	Fr
RB	45	Drake Kulick	Sr
RB	36	Brady Ross	So
RB	25	Akrum Wadley	Sr
RB	28	Toren Young	Fr
WR	2	Brandon Bishop	Jr
WR	19	Max Cooper	Fr
WR	23	Dominique Dafney	So
WR	84	Nick Easley	Jr
WR	82	Adrian Falconer	Jr
WR	13	Henry Marchese	Fr
WR	12	Brandon Smith	Fr
WR	6	Ihmir Smith-Marsette	Fr
WR	89	Matt VandeBerg	Sr
WR	80	Devonte Young	So
TE	42	Shaun Beyer	Fr
TE	18	Drew Cook	So
TE	88	Jacob Coons	Fr
TE	87	Noah Fant	So
TE	38	T. J. Hockenson	Fr
TE	86	Peter Pekar	Sr
TE	85	Nate Vejvoda	So
TE	39	Nate Wieting	So
TE	81	Jon Wisnieski	Sr
OL	61	Cole Banwart	Fr
OL	75	Ike Boettger (injured)	Sr
OL	78	James Daniels	Jr
OL	76	Dalton Ferguson	Jr
OL	77	Alaric Jackson	Fr
OL	71	Mark Kallenberger	Fr
OL	72	Coy Kirkpatrick	Fr
OL	70	Lucas LeGrand	Jr
OL	52	Boone Myers (injured)	Sr
OL	68	Landan Paulsen	So
OL	66	Levi Paulsen	So
OL	56	Burke Prins	Fr
OL	69	Keegan Render	Jr
OL	59	Ross Reynolds	Jr
OL	79	Sean Welsh	Sr
OL	63	Spencer Williams	Fr
OL	74	Tristan Wirfs	Fr

Defense

Pos.	#	Name	Class
DL	99	Nathan Bazata	Sr
DL	90	Sam Brincks	Jr
DL	67	Levi Duwa	Fr
DL	94	A. J. Epenesa	Fr
DL	77	Daniel Gaffney	Sr
DL	60	Jacob Giese	So
DL	57	Chauncey Golston	Fr
DL	40	Parker Hesse	Jr
DL	88	Jake Hulett	Sr
DL	66	Dallas Jacobus	Fr
DL	53	Garret Jansen	So
DL	82	Jack Kallenberger	Jr
DL	95	Cedrick Lattimore	So
DL	97	Romeo McKnight	Fr
DL	98	Anthony Nelson	So
DL	96	Matt Nelson	Jr
DL	58	Jake Newborg	Jr
DL	91	Brady Reiff	So
DL	74	Austin Schulte	Fr
DL	93	Brandon Simon	Fr
LB	41	Bo Bower	Sr
LB	48	Jack Hockaday	Jr
LB	43	Josey Jewell	Sr
LB	52	Amani Jones	So
LB	31	Aaron Mends	Jr
LB	44	Ben Niemann	Sr
LB	49	Nick Niemann	Fr
LB	50	Jacob Sobotka	Jr
LB	55	Kyle Taylor	Fr
LB	35	Barrington Wade	Fr
LB	26	Kevin Ward	Sr
LB	34	Kristian Welch	So
LB	29	Nate Wieland	Fr
DB	20	Cedric Boswell	Fr
DB	33	Noah Clayberg	Fr
DB	32	Djimon Colbert	Fr
DB	3	Trey Creamer	Fr
DB	1	Wes Dvorak	So
DB	30	Jake Gervase	Jr
DB	8	Matt Hankins	Fr
DB	10	Camron Harrell	Fr
DB	27	Amani Hooker	So
DB	15	Joshua Jackson	Jr
DB	18	John Milani	So
DB	11	Michael Ojemudia	So
DB	5	Manny Rugamba	So
DB	37	Brandon Snyder (injured)	Jr
DB	9	Geno Stone	Fr
DB	19	Miles Taylor	Sr
DB	4	Josh Turner	Fr

Special teams

Pos.	#	Name	Class
K	3	Keith Duncan	So
K	6	Josh Proehl	Fr
K	91	Miguel Recinos	Jr
K	94	Caleb Shudak	Fr
K	95	Lena Osman	Jr
P	90	Ryan Gersonde	Fr
P	7	Colten Rastetter	So
LS	97	Tyler Kluver	Sr
LS	84	Austin Spiewak	Fr
LS	50	Jackson Subbert	So

Head coach

- Kirk Ferentz

Coordinators/assistant coaches

- Brian Ferentz – Offensive coordinator/running backs
- Phil Parker – Defensive coordinator/secondary
- LeVar Woods – Special teams coordinator/tight ends
- Chris Doyle – Strength and conditioning
- Kelvin Bell – Recruiting coordinator/Assistant Defensive Line
- Ken O'Keefe – Quarterbacks
- Kelton Copeland – Wide receivers
- Tim Polasek – Offensive line
- Reese Morgan – Defensive line
- Seth Wallace – Linebackers coach
- Raimond Braithwaite – Assistant, strength and conditioning
- Nick DiMarco – Assistant, strength and conditioning
- Justin Lima – Assistant, strength and conditioning
- Cody Meyers – Assistant, strength and conditioning
- Paul Federici – Director of football operations
- Ben Hansen – Assistant director of football operations
- Broderick Binns – Director, player development
- Scott Southmayd – Director, player personnel
- Max Allen – Director, football new media
- Tyler Barnes – Director, recruiting
- Tyler Anderson – Graduate assistant
- Martin Hopkins – Graduate assistant
- Joe Pawlak – Graduate assistant
- Don Shumpert – Graduate assistant
- Austin Showalter – Football analyst/administrative assistant
- Bob Rahfeldt – Video Coordinator
- Chris Ruth – Assistant video coordinator

Legend

- (C) Team captain
- (S) Suspended
- (I) Ineligible
- Injured
- Redshirt

Roster
Last update: 8/3/17

== Rankings ==
Ranking movements Legend: ██ Increase in ranking ██ Decrease in ranking — = Not ranked RV = Received votes
	Week															
Poll	Pre	1	2	3	4	5	6	7	8	9	10	11	12	13	14	Final
AP	—	RV	RV	RV	RV	—	—	RV	—	—	25	RV	—	—	—	RV
Coaches	RV	RV	RV	RV	RV	—	RV	—	—	RV	RV	RV	—	—	—	RV
CFP	Not released									—	20	—	—	—	—	Not released

== Game summaries ==
=== Wyoming ===
Wyoming at Iowa

Team	1	2	3	4	Total
Cowboys	0	3	0	0	3
• Hawkeyes	0	14	7	3	24

- Date: September 2
- Location:
  Kinnick Stadium
  Iowa City, IA
- Game start: 11:01 a.m. CDT
- Elapsed time: 2:57
- Game attendance: 68,075
- Game weather: 64 °F (18 °C), Overcast, Wind SSW 5-10
- Referee: Mark Kluczynski (MAC)
- TV announcers (BTN): Kevin Kugler, Matt Millen, Lisa Byington
- Source: Box Score

Scoring summary
2	11:21	Wyoming	Cooper Rothe 49-yard field goal	Wyoming 3–0
2	5:07	Iowa	Noah Fant 2-yard pass from Nate Stanley (Miguel Recinos kick)	Iowa 7–3
2	0:22	Iowa	Noah Fant 27-yard pass from Nate Stanley (Miguel Recinos kick)	Iowa 14–3
3	5:34	Iowa	Nick Easley 45-yard pass from Nate Stanley (Miguel Recinos kick)	Iowa 21–3
4	7:52	Iowa	Miguel Recinos 44-yard field goal	Iowa 24–3

Iowa opened up the 2017 football season against the Wyoming Cowboys and highly rated Wyoming quarterback Josh Allen. The Hawkeyes got off to a slow start, but after Wyoming punter Tim Zaleski missed the ball on the attempted punt, the Hawkeyes took a 14–3 lead at the half. Iowa built on the momentum with a 45-yard pass from first-year starter Nate Stanley to wide receiver Nick Easley. Iowa wins the season opener 24–3. Iowa's defense impressed many, holding Josh Allen to only 174 yards and 17 incompletions, and a quarterback rating of 24.9. Iowa defense also picked off Allen twice.

This game marked the debut of the "Kinnick Wave", a new Iowa football tradition in which fans turn toward the children's hospital that overlooks the playing field at the end of the first quarter and wave to patients and their families watching the game from the hospital.

Statistics	WYO	IOWA
First downs	15	16
Total yards	233	263
Rushing yards	59	138
Passing yards	174	125
Turnovers	2	4
Time of possession	31:06	28:54

Team	Category	Player	Statistics
Wyoming	Passing	Josh Allen	23/40, 174 yards, 2 INT
Wyoming	Rushing	Milo Hall	9 carries, 30 yards
Wyoming	Receiving	Austin Conway	7 receptions, 47 yards
Iowa	Passing	Nate Stanley	8/15, 125 yards, 3 TD, INT
Iowa	Rushing	Akrum Wadley	24 carries, 116 yards
Iowa	Receiving	Nick Easley	4 receptions, 77 yards, TD

=== At Iowa State ===
Iowa at Iowa State
Cy-Hawk Trophy

Team	1	2	3	4	OT	Total
• Hawkeyes	7	7	7	17	6	44
Cyclones	7	3	14	14	3	41

- Date: September 9
- Location: Jack Trice Stadium
  Ames, IA
- Game start: 11:01 a.m. CDT
- Elapsed time: 3:53
- Game attendance: 61,500
- Game weather: 65 °F (18 °C) Mostly Clear, Wind SE 5–10 mph (8.0–16.1 km/h)
- Referee: Ron Snodgrass (B1G)
- TV announcers (ESPN2): Jason Benetti, Kelly Stouffer, Julie Stewart-Binks
- Source: Box Score Archived September 10, 2017, at the Wayback Machine

Scoring summary
1	9:03	ISU	Allen Lazard 5-yard pass from Jacob Park (Garrett Owens kick)	Iowa St 7–0
1	4:23	Iowa	Nick Easley 10-yard pass from Nate Stanley (Miguel Recinos kick)	Tied 7–7
2	11:05	ISU	Garrett Owens 24-yard field goal	Iowa St 10–7
2	0:52	Iowa	Matt VandeBerg 17-yard pass from Nate Stanley (Miguel Recinos kick)	Iowa 14–10
3	7:21	Iowa	Akrum Wadley 1-yard run (Miguel Recinos kick)	Iowa 21–10
3	4:37	ISU	Allen Lazard 3-yard pass from Jacob Park (Garrett Owens kick)	Iowa 21–17
3	0:52	ISU	Hakeem Butler 30-yard pass from Jacob Park (Garrett Owens kick)	Iowa St 24–21
4	11:46	ISU	David Montgomery 7-yard run (Garrett Owens kick)	Iowa St 31–21
4	6:25	Iowa	Ihmir Smith-Marsette 15-yard pass from Nate Stanley (Miguel Recinos kick)	Iowa St 31–28
4	5:16	Iowa	Miguel Recinos 23-yard field goal	Tied 31–31
4	4:36	ISU	Hakeem Butler 74-yard pass from Jacob Park (Garrett Owens kick)	Iowa St 38–31
4	1:09	Iowa	Akrum Wadley 46-yard pass from Nate Stanley (Miguel Recinos kick)	Tied 38–38
OT	0:00	ISU	Garrett Owens 30-yard field goal	Iowa St 41–38
OT	0:00	Iowa	Ihmir Smith-Marsette 5-yard pass from Nate Stanley	Iowa 44–41

Iowa's first rivalry game of the year was the Cy-Hawk series against Big 12 foe Iowa State – fresh off a 42–3 beatdown in Iowa City the past year. ISU's 2nd year coach Matt Campbell referred to Iowa as the "team out east" in pregame preparations. This game had a relatively slow beginning and Iowa appeared to be in control well into the third quarter. However, Iowa State's offense exploded and put up 28 points in the second half. The game ultimately went to OT and the "team out east" prevailed with a Nate Stanley touchdown pass.

Statistics	IOWA	IOWA ST
First downs	29	22
Total yards	497	467
Rushing yards	164	120
Passing yards	333	347
Turnovers	0	1
Time of possession	37:07	22:53

Team	Category	Player	Statistics
Iowa	Passing	Nate Stanley	27/41, 333 yards, 5 TD
Iowa	Rushing	Akrum Wadley	28 carries, 118 yards, TD
Iowa	Receiving	Nick Easley	7 receptions, 48 yards, TD
Iowa State	Passing	Jacob Park	25/46, 347 yards, 4 TD, INT
Iowa State	Rushing	David Montgomery	20 carries, 112 yards, TD
Iowa State	Receiving	Allen Lazard	6 receptions, 23 yards, 2 TD

=== North Texas ===
North Texas at Iowa

Team	1	2	3	4	Total
Mean Green	7	7	0	0	14
• Hawkeyes	7	3	7	14	31

- Date: September 16
- Location:
  Kinnick Stadium
  Iowa City, IA
- Game start: 2:35 p.m. CDT
- Elapsed time: 3:26
- Game attendance: 65,668
- Game weather: 88 °F (31 °C), Partly Cloudy, Wind S 10 mph (16 km/h)
- Referee: Jeff Servinski
- TV announcers (ESPN2): Anish Shroff, Ahmad Brooks, Roddy Jones
- Source: Box Score

Scoring summary
1	5:34	UNT	Jeffery Wilson 41-yard run (Trevor Moore kick)	UNT 7–0
1	0:52	Iowa	T. J. Hockenson 8-yard pass from Nate Stanley (Miguel Recinos kick)	Tied 7–7
2	5:23	Iowa	Miguel Recinos 42-yard field goal	Iowa 10–7
2	0:11	UNT	Jalen Guyton 13-yard pass from Quinn Shanbour (Trevor Moore kick)	UNT 14–10
3	4:24	Iowa	Noah Fant 23-yard pass from Nate Stanley (Miguel Recinos kick)	Iowa 17–14
4	8:16	Iowa	Ivory Kelly-Martin 2-yard run (Miguel Recinos kick)	Iowa 24–14
4	1:47	Iowa	Ivory Kelly-Martin 6-yard run (Miguel Recinos kick)	Iowa 31–14

After an emotional win from a week prior, Iowa got off to a sluggish start though ultimately pulled away to start out 3–0.

Statistics	UNT	IOWA
First downs	17	28
Total yards	305	435
Rushing yards	112	238
Passing yards	193	197
Turnovers	1	1
Time of possession	19:15	40:45

Team	Category	Player	Statistics
North Texas	Passing	Mason Fine	16/26, 167 yards, INT
North Texas	Rushing	Jeff Wilson	12 carries, 95 yards, TD
North Texas	Receiving	Turner Smiley	4 receptions, 74 yards
Iowa	Passing	Nate Stanley	16/27, 197 yards, 2 TD
Iowa	Rushing	Toren Young	19 carries, 78 yards
Iowa	Receiving	Nick Easley	5 receptions, 37 yards

=== No. 4 Penn State ===
No. 4 Penn State at Iowa

Team	1	2	3	4	Total
• No. 4 Nittany Lions	3	2	10	6	21
Hawkeyes	0	7	0	12	19

- Date: September 23
- Location: Kinnick Stadium
  Iowa, IA
- Game start: 6:42 p.m. CDT
- Elapsed time: 3:31
- Game attendance: 66,205
- Game weather: 91°, Clear, Wind SSE 5-10
- Referee: John O'Neill
- TV announcers (ABC): Chris Fowler, Kirk Herbstreit, Maria Taylor
- Source: Box Score

Scoring summary
1	1:01	Penn St	Tyler Davis 19-yard field goal	Penn St 3–0
2	7:40	Penn St	Shareef Miller Safety	Penn St 5–0
2	0:37	Iowa	Nick Easley 21-yard pass from Nate Stanley (Miguel Recinos kick)	Iowa 7–5
3	10:42	Penn St	Tyler Davis 21-yard field goal	Penn St 8–7
3	5:16	Penn St	Saquon Barkley 8-yard run (Tyler Davis kick)	Penn St 15–7
4	10:02	Iowa	Akrum Wadley 70-yard pass from Nate Stanley (pass failed)	Penn St 15–13
4	1:42	Iowa	Akrum Wadley 35-yard run (pass failed)	Iowa 19–15
4	0:00	Penn St	Juwan Johnson 7-yard pass from Trace McSorley (run failed)	Penn St 21–19

Statistics	PSU	IOWA
First downs	29	11
Total yards	579	273
Rushing yards	295	82
Passing yards	284	191
Turnovers	2	1
Time of possession	39:39	20:21

Team	Category	Player	Statistics
Penn State	Passing	Trace McSorley	31/44, 284 yards, TD, INT
Penn State	Rushing	Saquon Barkley	28 carries, 211 yards, TD
Penn State	Receiving	Saquon Barkley	12 receptions, 94 yards
Iowa	Passing	Nate Stanley	13/22, 191 yards, 2 TD
Iowa	Rushing	Akrum Wadley	19 carries, 80 yards, TD
Iowa	Receiving	Akrum Wadley	4 receptions, 75 yards, TD

=== At Michigan State ===
Iowa at Michigan State

Team	1	2	3	4	Total
Hawkeyes	0	7	0	3	10
• Spartans	14	3	0	0	17

- Date: September 30
- Location: Spartan Stadium
  East Lansing, MI
- Game start: 4:17 p.m. EDT
- Elapsed time: 3:16
- Game attendance: 73,331
- Game weather: 64°, Sunny, Partly Cloudy, Wind NNE 3
- Referee: Mike Cannon
- TV announcers (FOX): Aaron Goldsmith, Brady Quinn, Bruce Feldman
- Source: Box Score

Scoring summary
1	11:50	Mich St	Felton Davis 22-yard pass from Brian Lewerke (Matt Coghlin kick)	Mich St 7–0
1	2:11	Mich St	Felton Davis 22-yard pass from Brian Lewerke (Matt Coghlin kick)	Mich St 14–0
2	12:15	Iowa	Akrum Wadley 9-yard run (Miguel Recinos kick)	Mich St 14–7
2	0:43	Mich St	Matt Coghlin 38-yard field goal	Mich St 17–7
4	9:08	Iowa	Miguel Recinos 43-yard field goal	Mich St 17–10

Statistics	IOWA	MSU
First downs	11	19
Total yards	231	300
Rushing yards	19	88
Passing yards	212	212
Turnovers	2	0
Time of possession	26:26	33:34

Team	Category	Player	Statistics
Iowa	Passing	Nate Stanley	16/31, 197 yards
Iowa	Rushing	Akrum Wadley	17 carries, 30 yards, TD
Iowa	Receiving	T. J. Hockenson	3 receptions, 46 yards
Michigan State	Passing	Brian Lewerke	18/28, 212 yards, 2 TD
Michigan State	Rushing	Brian Lewerke	12 carries, 42 yards
Michigan State	Receiving	Felton Davis III	9 receptions, 114 yards, 2 TD

=== Illinois ===
Illinois at Iowa
Homecoming

Team	1	2	3	4	Total
Fighting Illini	3	10	3	0	16
• Hawkeyes	7	10	7	21	45

- Date: October 7
- Location: Kinnick Stadium
  Iowa City, IA
- Game start: 11:00 a.m. CDT
- Elapsed time: 3:24
- Game attendance: 69,894
- Game weather: 68 °F (20 °C), Overcast, Wind S 5–10 mph (8.0–16.1 km/h)
- Referee: Dan Capron
- TV announcers (BTN): Brandon Gaudin, Glen Mason, Elise Menaker
- Source: Box Score

Scoring summary
1	9:32	Illinois	Chase McLaughlin 29-yard field goal	Illinois 3–0
1	4:16	Iowa	Nick Easley 5-yard pass from Nate Stanley (Miguel Recinos kick)	Iowa 7–3
2	9:06	Iowa	Miguel Recinos 37-yard field goal	Iowa 10–3
2	6:40	Illinois	Ra'Von Bonner 2-yard run (Chase McLaughlin kick)	Tied 10–10
2	2:49	Illinois	Chase McLaughlin 24-yard field goal	Illinois 13–10
2	0:08	Iowa	Akrum Wadley 2-yard pass from Nate Stanley (Miguel Recinos kick)	Iowa 17–13
3	6:40	Iowa	Brandon Snyder 89-yard interception return (Miguel Recinos kick)	Iowa 24–13
3	2:43	Illinois	Chase McLaughlin 40-yard field goal	Iowa 24–16
4	14:22	Iowa	Matt VandeBerg 39-yard pass from Nate Stanley (Miguel Recinos kick)	Iowa 31–16
4	8:49	Iowa	Akrum Wadley 18-yard run (Miguel Recinos kick)	Iowa 38–16
4	3:36	Iowa	Ivory Kelly-Martin 3-yard pass from Tyler Wiegers (Miguel Recinos kick)	Iowa 45–16

Illinois played with Iowa well into the third quarter. The Hawkeyes appeared lethargic but a Brandon Snyder interception sparked an Iowa rally and they dominated the rest of the way.

Statistics	ILL	IOWA
First downs	20	20
Total yards	446	441
Rushing yards	200	191
Passing yards	246	250
Turnovers	4	2
Time of possession	31:40	28:20

Team	Category	Player	Statistics
Illinois	Passing	Jeff George Jr.	22–45, 246 yards, 3 INT
Illinois	Rushing	Mike Epstein	7 carries, 83 yards
Illinois	Receiving	Carmoni Green	4 receptions, 28 yards
Iowa	Passing	Nate Stanley	17–32, 247 yards, 3 TD, INT
Iowa	Rushing	Akrum Wadley	23 carries, 115 yards, TD
Iowa	Receiving	Nick Easley	7 receptions, 59 yards, TD

=== At Northwestern ===
Iowa at Northwestern

Team	1	2	3	4	OT	Total
Hawkeyes	0	7	0	3	0	10
• Wildcats	0	0	7	3	7	17

- Date: October 21
- Location: Ryan Field
  Evanston, IL
- Game start: 11:00 a.m. CDT
- Elapsed time: 3:10
- Game attendance: 40,036
- Game weather: 66 °F (19 °C), Mostly Cloudy, Wind S 12 mph (19 km/h)
- Referee: Don Willard
- TV announcers (ESPN2): Jason Benetti, Kelly Stouffer, Kris Budden
- Source: Box Score

Scoring summary
2	0:40	Iowa	Noah Fant 7-yard pass from Nate Stanley (Miguel Recinos kick)	Iowa 7–0
3	7:19	NW	Larkin 6-yard run (Kuhbander kick)	Tied 7–7
4	8:07	NW	Kuhbander 30-yard field goal	NW 10–7
4	1:30	Iowa	Miguel Recinos 48-yard field goal	Tied 10–10
OT		NW	Thorson 1-yard run (Kuhbander kick)	NW 17–10

Statistics	IOWA	NW
First downs	14	21
Total yards	312	339
Rushing yards	89	147
Passing yards	223	192
Turnovers	1	0
Time of possession	30:44	29:16

Team	Category	Player	Statistics
Iowa	Passing	Nate Stanley	19/33, 223 yards, TD, INT
Iowa	Rushing	Akrum Wadley	26 carries, 90 yards
Iowa	Receiving	Matt VandeBerg	3 receptions, 90 yards
Northwestern	Passing	Clayton Thorson	21/36, 192 yards
Northwestern	Rushing	Justin Jackson	25 carries, 93 yards
Northwestern	Receiving	Macan Wilson	5 receptions, 47 yards

=== Minnesota ===
Minnesota at Iowa
Floyd of Rosedale

Team	1	2	3	4	Total
Golden Gophers	0	0	0	10	10
• Hawkeyes	7	0	7	3	17

- Date: October 28
- Location: Kinnick Stadium
  Iowa City, IA
- Game start: 5:40 p.m. CDT
- Elapsed time: 3:20
- Game attendance: 66,292
- Game weather: 38 °F (3 °C), Overcast, Wind NW 5–10 mph (8.0–16.1 km/h)
- Referee: Mike Cannon
- TV announcers (FS1): Joe Davis, Brady Quinn, Bruce Feldman
- Source: Box Score

Scoring summary
1	12:37	Iowa	Akrum Wadley 12-yard run (Miguel Recinos kick)	Iowa 7–0
3	11:00	Iowa	Noah Fant 45-yard pass from Nate Stanley (Miguel Recinos kick)	Iowa 14–0
4	8:07	Minn	McCrary 1-yard run (Carpenter kick)	Iowa 14–7
4	5:34	Iowa	Miguel Recinos 32-yard field goal	Iowa 17–7
4	4:28	Minn	Carpenter 33-yard field goal	Iowa 17–10

Iowa won their third in a row in this rivalry contest.

Statistics	MINN	IOWA
First downs	15	15
Total yards	281	315
Rushing yards	142	125
Passing yards	139	190
Turnovers	1	2
Time of possession	31:13	28:47

Team	Category	Player	Statistics
Minnesota	Passing	Demry Croft	9–29, 139 yards, INT
Minnesota	Rushing	Rodney Smith	15 carries, 82 yards
Minnesota	Receiving	Tyler Johnson	4 receptions, 92 yards
Iowa	Passing	Nate Stanley	15–27, 190 yards, TD, INT
Iowa	Rushing	Akrum Wadley	16 carries, 70 yards, TD
Iowa	Receiving	Noah Fant	3 receptions, 67 yards, TD

=== No. 6 Ohio State ===
No. 6 Ohio State at Iowa

Team	1	2	3	4	Total
No. 6 Buckeyes	10	7	0	7	24
• Hawkeyes	10	21	7	17	55

- Date: November 4
- Location: Kinnick Stadium
  Iowa City, IA
- Game start: 2:30 p.m. CDT
- Elapsed time: 3:33
- Game attendance: 67,669
- Game weather: 47 °F (8 °C), Overcast, Wind 2–4 mph (3.2–6.4 km/h)
- Referee: Ron Snodgrass
- TV announcers (ESPN): Steve Levy, Brian Griese, Todd McShay
- Source: Box Score

Scoring summary
1	14:52	Iowa	Amani Hooker 30-yard interception return (Miguel Recinos kick)	Iowa 7–0
1	12:42	Ohio St	Terry McLaurin 29-yard pass from J. T. Barrett (Sean Nuernberger kick)	Tied 7–7
1	9:19	Iowa	Miguel Recinos 30-yard field goal	Iowa 10–7
1	4:32	Ohio St	Sean Nuernberger 27-yard field goal	Tied 10–10
2	13:41	Iowa	T. J. Hockenson 10-yard pass from Nate Stanley (Miguel Recinos kick)	Iowa 17–10
2	10:22	Ohio St	Johnnie Dixon 44-yard pass from J.T. Barrett (Sean Nuernberger kick)	Tied 17–17
2	3:06	Iowa	Noah Fant 25-yard pass from Nate Stanley (Miguel Recinos kick)	Iowa 24–17
2	0:30	Iowa	Noah Fant 3-yard pass from Nate Stanley (Miguel Recinos kick)	Iowa 31–17
3	2:30	Iowa	T. J. Hockenson 2-yard pass from Nate Stanley (Miguel Recinos kick)	Iowa 38–17
4	14:56	Iowa	Drake Kulick 2-yard pass from Nate Stanley (Miguel Recinos kick)	Iowa 45–17
4	13:16	Iowa	Miguel Recinos 30-yard field goal	Iowa 48–17
4	4:37	Ohio St	Johnnie Dixon 22-yard pass from J.T. Barrett (Sean Nuernberger kick)	Iowa 48–24
4	1:43	Iowa	Toren Young 6-yard run (Miguel Recinos kick)	Iowa 55–24

Iowa was able to defeat Ohio State for the first time since 2004 in this blowout victory. The Buckeyes played with the Hawkeyes for most of the first half but from there the game belonged to Iowa. It was one of the most impressive wins of the Ferentz era and Nate Stanley's most distinguished to that point as well. Tight ends Noah Fant and T. J. Hockenson combined for 9 receptions, 125 yards, and 4 touchdowns. Defensive back and future NFL player Josh Jackson also had an outstanding game, tying an Iowa school record with three interceptions.

Statistics	OSU	IOWA
First downs	20	24
Total yards	371	487
Rushing yards	163	243
Passing yards	208	244
Turnovers	4	0
Time of possession	25:09	34:51

Team	Category	Player	Statistics
Ohio State	Passing	J. T. Barrett	18/34, 208 yards, 3 TD, 4 INT
Ohio State	Rushing	J. T. Barrett	14 carries, 63 yards
Ohio State	Receiving	J. K. Dobbins	5 receptions, 25 yards
Iowa	Passing	Nate Stanley	20/31, 226 yards, 5 TD
Iowa	Rushing	Akrum Wadley	20 carries, 118 yards
Iowa	Receiving	T. J. Hockenson	5 receptions, 71 yards, 2 TD

=== At No. 8 Wisconsin ===
No. 20 Iowa at No. 8 Wisconsin
Heartland Trophy

Team	1	2	3	4	Total
No. 20 Hawkeyes	7	0	7	0	14
• No. 8 Badgers	3	14	7	14	38

- Date: November 11
- Location: Camp Randall Stadium
  Madison, WI
- Game start: 2:36 p.m. CST
- Elapsed time: 3:14
- Game attendance: 80,462
- Game weather: 30 °F (−1 °C), Cloudy, Wind S 9 mph (14 km/h)
- Referee: J. O'Neill
- TV announcers (ABC): Joe Tessitore, Todd Blackledge, Holly Rowe
- Source: Box Score

Scoring summary
1	13:30	Iowa	Josh Jackson 43-yard interception return (Miguel Recinos kick)	Iowa 7–0
1	5:43	Wisconsin	R. Gaglianone 23-yard field goal	Iowa 7–3
2	8:55	Wisconsin	Kendric Pryor 25-yard run (Gaglianone kick)	Wisconsin 10–7
2	1:19	Wisconsin	Kendric Pryor 12-yard pass from A. Hornibrook (Gaglianone kick)	Wisconsin 17–7
3	11:18	Iowa	Josh Jackson 52-yard interception return (Miguel Recinos kick)	Wisconsin 17–14
3	6:10	Wisconsin	Leon Jacobs 21-yard fumble return (Gaglianone kick)	Wisconsin 24–14
4	11:05	Wisconsin	Bradrick Shaw 8-yard run (Gaglianone kick)	Wisconsin 31–14
4	7:02	Wisconsin	A.J. Taylor 5-yard pass from A. Hornibrook (Gaglianone kick)	Wisconsin 38–14

One week after the unexpected domination of Ohio State, the Hawkeye offense struggled terribly in Madison with 66 yards of total offense coming on 50 plays. Josh Jackson continued his torrid run with two interceptions – both returned for touchdowns.

Statistics	IOWA	WIS
First downs	5	18
Total yards	66	382
Rushing yards	25	247
Passing yards	41	135
Turnovers	3	4
Time of possession	21:33	38:27

Team	Category	Player	Statistics
Iowa	Passing	Nate Stanley	8/24, 41 yards, INT
Iowa	Rushing	James Butler	8 carries, 30 yards
Iowa	Receiving	Nick Easley	2 receptions, 19 yards
Wisconsin	Passing	Alex Hornibrook	11/18, 135 yards, 2 TD, 3 INT
Wisconsin	Rushing	Jonathan Taylor	29 carries, 157 yards
Wisconsin	Receiving	Danny Davis	4 receptions, 74 yards

=== Purdue ===
Purdue at Iowa

Team	1	2	3	4	Total
• Boilermakers	7	0	14	3	24
Hawkeyes	0	9	0	6	15

- Date: November 18
- Location: Kinnick Stadium
  Iowa City, IA
- Game start: 2:40 p.m. CST
- Elapsed time: 3:03
- Game attendance: 60,554
- Game weather: 42 °F (6 °C), Partly Sunny, Wind NW 20 mph (32 km/h)
- Referee: Jeff Servinski
- TV announcers (BTN): Kevin Kugler, Matt Millen, Lisa Byington
- Source: Box Score

Scoring summary
1	14:52	Purdue	D.J. Knox 5-yard pass from Elijah Sindelar (J.D. Dellinger kick)	Purdue 7–0
2	10:44	Iowa	Nathan Bazata 3-yard sack for a safety	Purdue 7–2
2	6:07	Iowa	Akrum Wadley 2-yard run (Miguel Recinos kick)	Iowa 9–7
3	14:03	Purdue	Anthony Mahoungou 42-yard pass from Elijah Sindelar (J.D. Dellinger kick)	Purdue 14–9
3	11:59	Purdue	Anthony Mahoungou 16-yard pass from Elijah Sindelar (J.D. Dellinger kick)	Purdue 21–9
4	3:55	Purdue	J.D. Dellinger 27-yard field goal	Purdue 24–9
4	1:04	Iowa	Noah Fant 8-yard pass from Nate Stanley (Two-point conversion failed)	Purdue 24–15

The Boilermakers spoiled Senior Day in Iowa City by employing an effective tactic from the Jeff Brohm-era against Iowa – find a mismatch in the passing game and continue to exploit it. Purdue's Anthony Mahoungou had 7 receptions for 135 yards and 2 TD.

Statistics	PUR	IOWA
First downs	20	17
Total yards	294	258
Rushing yards	65	82
Passing yards	229	176
Turnovers	0	2
Time of possession	26:17	33:43

Team	Category	Player	Statistics
Purdue	Passing	Elijah Sindelar	22/37, 229 yards, 3 TD
Purdue	Rushing	Markell Jones	14 carries, 74 yards
Purdue	Receiving	Anthony Mahoungou	7 receptions, 135 yards, 2 TD
Iowa	Passing	Nate Stanley	16/33, 176 yards, TD, INT
Iowa	Rushing	Akrum Wadley	22 carries, 78 yards, TD
Iowa	Receiving	Nick Easley	5 receptions, 60 yards

=== At Nebraska ===
Iowa at Nebraska
Heroes Trophy

Team	1	2	3	4	Total
• Hawkeyes	7	7	28	14	56
Cornhuskers	7	7	0	0	14

- Date: November 24
- Location: Memorial Stadium
  Lincoln, NE
- Game start: 3:06 p.m. CST
- Elapsed time: 3:05
- Game attendance: 90,046
- Game weather: 69 °F (21 °C), Sunny, Wind NNW 16 mph (26 km/h)
- Referee: Dan Capron
- TV announcers (FS1): Mark Followill, Danny Kanell
- Source: Box Score

Scoring summary
1	9:34	Neb	Stanley Morgan Jr. 14-yard pass from Tanner Lee (Drew Brown kick)	Neb 7–0
1	2:16	Iowa	Akrum Wadley 20-yard run (Miguel Recinos kick)	Tied 7–7
2	6:18	Neb	Stanley Morgan Jr. 28-yard pass from Tanner Lee (Drew Brown kick)	Neb 14–7
2	0:25	Iowa	Noah Fant 4-yard pass from Nate Stanley (Miguel Recinos kick)	Tied 14–14
3	12:24	Iowa	Akrum Wadley 1-yard run (Miguel Recinos kick)	Iowa 21–14
3	9:53	Iowa	James Butler 12-yard run (Miguel Recinos kick)	Iowa 28–14
3	8:32	Iowa	Akrum Wadley 29-yard run (Miguel Recinos kick)	Iowa 35–14
3	1:20	Iowa	Noah Fant 68-yard pass from Nate Stanley (Miguel Recinos kick)	Iowa 42–14
4	9:24	Iowa	Toren Young 3-yard run (Miguel Recinos kick)	Iowa 49–14
4	6:34	Iowa	Ivory Kelly-Martin 5-yard run (Miguel Recinos kick)	Iowa 56–14

Nebraska got out to a fast start and was up 14–7 in the second quarter with Iowa struggling to move the ball. The script completely flipped from that point though as the Hawkeyes scored 49 unanswered points and shut out the Cornhuskers in the second half.

Statistics	IOWA	NEB
First downs	23	12
Total yards	505	267
Rushing yards	313	67
Passing yards	192	200
Turnovers	0	3
Time of possession	33:09	26:51

Team	Category	Player	Statistics
Iowa	Passing	Nate Stanley	13/20, 192 yards, 2 TD
Iowa	Rushing	Akrum Wadley	19 carries, 159 yards, 3 TD
Iowa	Receiving	Noah Fant	3 receptions, 116 yards, 2 TD
Nebraska	Passing	Tanner Lee	22/41, 205 yards, 2 TD, 3 INT
Nebraska	Rushing	Mikale Wilbon	7 carries, 39 yards
Nebraska	Receiving	Stanley Morgan Jr.	7 receptions, 74 yards, 2 TD

=== vs. Boston College (Pinstripe Bowl) ===
Iowa vs. Boston College
Pinstripe Bowl

Team	1	2	3	4	Total
• Hawkeyes	3	7	7	10	27
Eagles	7	10	0	3	20

- Date: December 27
- Location: Yankee Stadium
  New York, NY
- Game start: 5:20 p.m. EST
- Elapsed time: 3:09
- Game attendance: 37,667
- Game weather: 23 °F (−5 °C), Clear and cold, Wind NW 12 mph (19 km/h) (WC 13)
- Referee: Terry Leyden
- TV announcers (ESPN): Kevin Negandhi, Mack Brown, Booger McFarland, Jen Lada
- Source: Box Score

Scoring summary
1	12:59	Iowa	Miguel Recinos 24-yard field goal	Iowa 3–0
1	0:05	BC	A. J. Dillon 4-yard run (C. Lichtenberg kick)	BC 7–3
2	13:18	Iowa	Noah Fant 8-yard pass from Nate Stanley (Miguel Recinos kick)	Iowa 10–7
2	9:35	BC	Tommy Sweeney 39-yard pass from Darius Wade (C. Lichtenberg kick)	BC 14–10
2	1:29	BC	Colton Lichtenberg 30-yard field goal	BC 17–10
3	7:11	Iowa	Akrum Wadley 5-yard run (Miguel Recinos kick)	Tied 17–17
4	11:32	Iowa	Miguel Recinos 38-yard field goal	Iowa 20–17
4	8:09	BC	Colton Lichtenberg 24-yard field goal	Tied 20–20
4	3:09	Iowa	Drake Kulick 1-yard run (Miguel Recinos kick)	Iowa 27–20

Iowa was able to end their bowl drought in this contest with Boston College. The Hawkeyes had trouble containing the Eagles' offense but with second half adjustments held them to just a field goal which came with only a few minutes left in the fourth quarter. The victory was bowl win number seven for Kirk Ferentz and tied legendary coach Hayden Fry in career wins with 143.

Statistics	IOWA	BC
First downs	13	16
Total yards	200	383
Rushing yards	101	175
Passing yards	99	208
Turnovers	0	3
Time of possession	27:25	32:35

Team	Category	Player	Statistics
Iowa	Passing	Nate Stanley	8/15, 99 yards, TD
Iowa	Rushing	Akrum Wadley	22 carries, 88 yards, TD
Iowa	Receiving	Akrum Wadley	2 receptions, 24 yards
Boston College	Passing	Darius Wade	16/27, 208 yards, TD, 2 INT
Boston College	Rushing	A. J. Dillon	32 carries, 157 yards, TD
Boston College	Receiving	Tommy Sweeney	7 receptions, 137 yards, TD

== Awards and honors ==
Weekly Awards
Player	Award	Date Awarded	Ref.
Josey Jewell	Big Ten Defensive Player of the Week	September 4, 2017	
Nate Stanley	Big Ten Co-offensive Player of the Week	September 11, 2017	
Josey Jewell	Big Ten Co-defensive Player of the Week	September 25, 2017	
Josh Jackson	Big Ten Co-defensive Player of the Week	November 6, 2017	
Josh Jackson	Big Ten Co-defensive Player of the Week	November 13, 2017	
Akrum Wadley	Big Ten Co-offensive Player of the Week	November 27, 2017	

=== Postseason Awards ===
- Josey Jewell – Big Ten Defensive Player of the Year, Big Ten Linebacker of the Year, Jack Lambert Award, Unanimous First-team All-American
- Josh Jackson – Big Ten Defensive Back of the Year, Jack Tatum Award, Unanimous First-team All-American

== Players in the 2018 NFL draft ==
Player	Position	Round	Pick	NFL club	Ref
James Daniels	C	2	39	Chicago Bears	
Josh Jackson	CB	2	45	Green Bay Packers	
Josey Jewell	LB	4	106	Denver Broncos	
