= Easily =

Easily may refer to:

- Easily Ltd, a domain name and web hosting company
- "Easily", a song by the Red Hot Chili Peppers from Californication
- "Easily", a song by Grimes from Art Angels

== People with the surname ==
- Ade Easily, former bassist of Tokyo Dragons

== See also ==
- Easley (disambiguation)
- Easy (disambiguation)
