= Akrum Wadley =

American football player (born 1995)

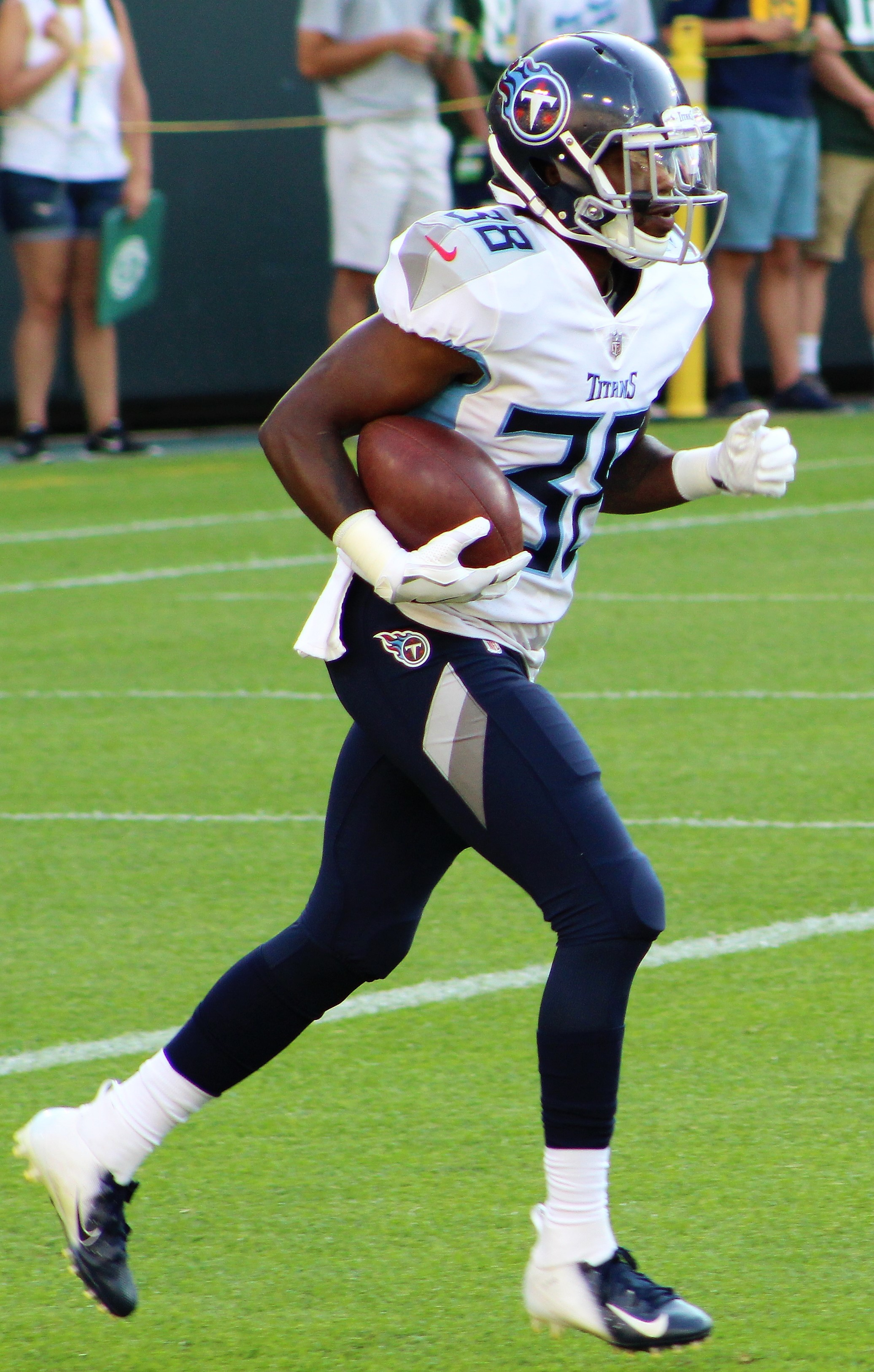
- Wadley with the Tennessee Titans in 2018

No. 38, 27
- Position: Running back

Personal information
- Born: March 13, 1995 (age 31); Newark, New Jersey, U.S.
- Listed height: 5 ft 10 in (1.78 m)
- Listed weight: 194 lb (88 kg)

Career information
- High school: Weequahic (Newark)
- College: Iowa
- NFL draft: 2018: undrafted

Career history
- Tennessee Titans (2018)*; Atlanta Legends (2019); Houston Roughnecks (2020)*
- * Offseason or practice squad member only

Awards and highlights
- Third-team All-Big Ten (2017)
- Stats at Pro Football Reference

Akrum Wadley (born March 13, 1995) is an American former football running back. He played college football for the Iowa Hawkeyes and was signed by the Tennessee Titans of the National Football League (NFL) as an undrafted free agent in 2018.

== Early life ==
Akrum was born on March 13, 1995, in Newark, New Jersey, to Sheronda Phelps and John Wadley. Akrum is one of five sons. Wadley attended Weequahic High School in Newark, New Jersey. He committed to the University of Iowa to play college football.

== College career ==
Wadley played at Iowa from 2014 to 2017. In his final collegiate game, he was named the MVP of the 2017 Pinstripe Bowl after rushing for 88 yards with a touchdown. During his career, he rushed for 2,872 yards over 536 carries with 28 touchdowns. While at Iowa, Wadley was a communications major

=== Statistics ===
Year	Team	G	Rushing					Receiving				
Year	Team	G	Att	Yards	Avg	Long	TD	Rec	Yards	Avg	Long	TD
2014	Iowa	5	33	186	5.6	26	1	1	−1	−1.0	−1.0	0
2015	Iowa	8	83	496	6.0	65	7	6	94	15.7	31	1
2016	Iowa	13	168	1,081	6.4	75	10	36	315	8.8	30	3
2017	Iowa	13	252	1,109	4.4	35	10	28	353	12.6	70	3
Totals		39	536	2,872	5.4	75	28	71	761	10.7	70	7

== Professional career ==
Pre-draft measurables
Height	Weight	Arm length	Hand span	Wingspan	40-yard dash	10-yard split	20-yard split	20-yard shuttle	Vertical jump	Bench press
5 ft 9 7/8 in (1.77 m)	194 lb (88 kg)	29 1/2 in (0.75 m)	8 1/4 in (0.21 m)	5 ft 11 5/8 in (1.82 m)	4.54 s	1.56 s	2.64 s	4.39 s	33.5 in (0.85 m)	12 reps
All values from NFL Combine/Pro Day

=== Tennessee Titans ===
Wadley signed with the Tennessee Titans as an undrafted free agent on May 11, 2018. He was waived by the Titans as a part of final roster cuts on September 1.

=== Atlanta Legends ===
In 2019, Wadley signed with the Atlanta Legends of the Alliance of American Football. He was placed on injured reserve on March 6, 2019. The league ceased operations in April 2019.

=== Houston Roughnecks ===
In October 2019, Wadley was picked by the Houston Roughnecks during the 2020 XFL draft. He was waived by the Roughnecks on January 5, 2020.

== Personal life ==
In a report published on June 29, 2020, Wadley made allegations against Iowa head coach Kirk Ferentz, offensive coordinator Brian Ferentz, and former strength and conditioning coach Chris Doyle. The allegations included mistreatment and racial disparities. A lawsuit ensued, where Wadley was a plaintiff. The suit ultimately settled out of court in 2023.
