= A. J. Dillon =

American football player (born 1998)

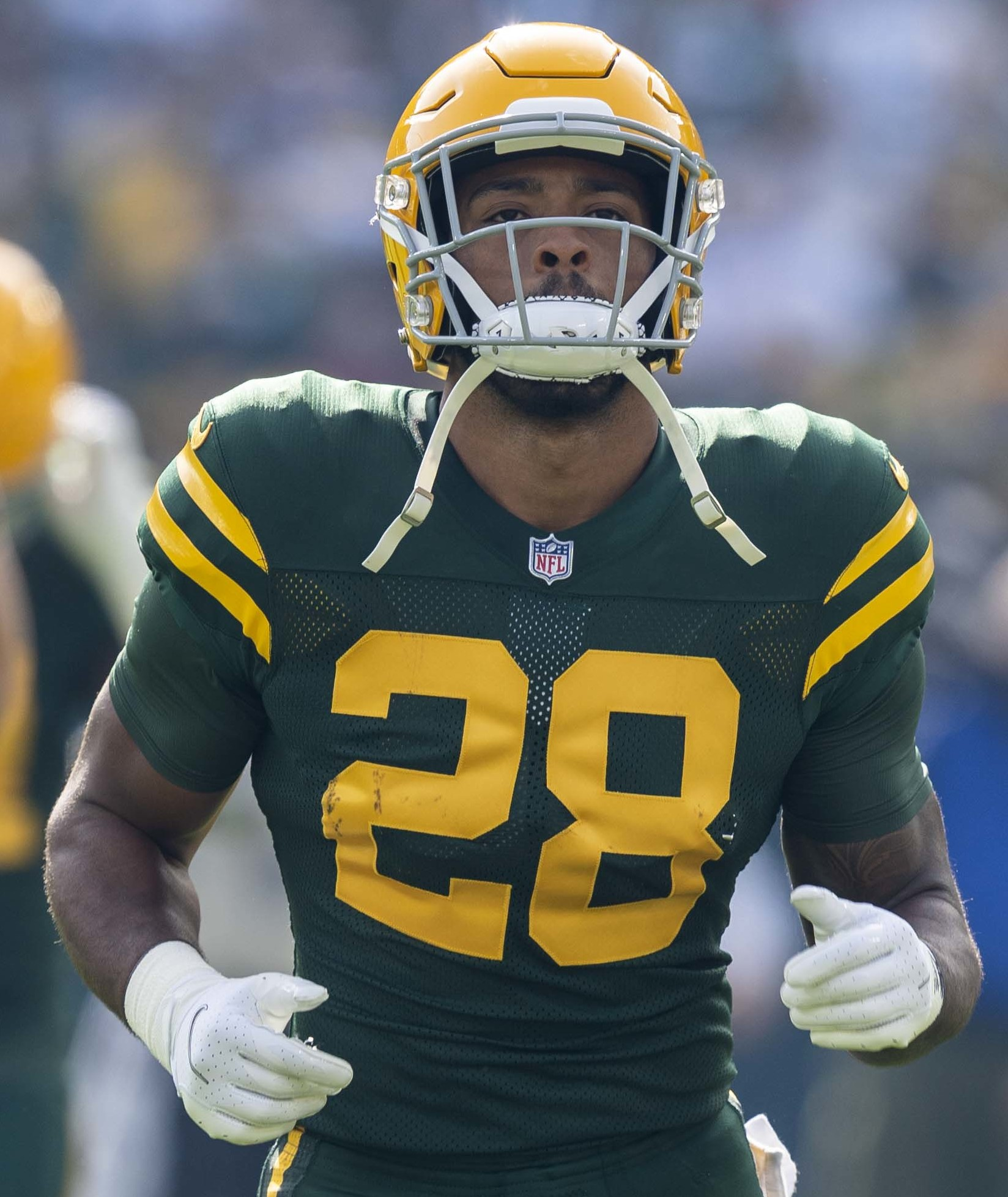
- Dillon with the Green Bay Packers in 2021

No. 28 – Carolina Panthers
- Position: Running back
- Roster status: Active

Personal information
- Born: May 2, 1998 (age 28); Baltimore, Maryland, U.S.
- Listed height: 6 ft 0 in (1.83 m)
- Listed weight: 248 lb (112 kg)

Career information
- High school: Lawrence Academy (Groton, Massachusetts), New London High School (New London, Connecticut)
- College: Boston College (2017–2019)
- NFL draft: 2020: 2nd round, 62nd overall pick

Career history
- Green Bay Packers (2020–2024); Philadelphia Eagles (2025); Carolina Panthers (2026–present)

Awards and highlights
- ACC Rookie of the Year (2017); ACC Offensive Rookie of the Year (2017); Third-team All-American (2019); 3× First-team All-ACC (2017, 2018, 2019)

Career NFL statistics as of Week 4, 2026
- Rushing yards: 2,531
- Rushing average: 4
- Rushing touchdowns: 16
- Receptions: 91
- Receiving yards: 787
- Receiving touchdowns: 2
- Stats at Pro Football Reference

Algiers Jameal William Dillon Jr. (born May 2, 1998), nicknamed "Quadzilla", is an American professional football running back for the Carolina Panthers of the National Football League (NFL). He played college football for the Boston College Eagles, with whom he became the school's all-time rushing yards leader with 4,382 yards.

== Early life ==
Dillon grew up in Connecticut. While on the high school football team at New London High School as a freshman, Dillon played sparingly. At that point, he was recruited to Lawrence Academy in Groton, Massachusetts, a private boarding school. Dillon played four years at Lawrence and was clearly the focus of the team's offense by his second year when he rushed for 1321 yards and 21 touchdowns while also starting at linebacker. As a junior, he rushed for 1,887 yards and 26 touchdowns. As a senior, he played in only four games due to a broken leg but still rushed for 635 yards with 12 touchdowns. He ran a 4.56 40-yard dash and was named MVP of Nike's Opening. Dillon originally committed to the University of Michigan to play college football but eventually flipped his commitment and signed with Boston College.

== College career ==
=== 2017 season ===
In his collegiate debut, Dillon rushed five times for 20 yards against Northern Illinois. In the Eagles' fourth game, Dillon had his first collegiate touchdown against Clemson on the road. In the following game, against Central Michigan, he had 25 carries for 120 rushing yards and one touchdown. On October 14, in a road victory over Louisville, he had a breakout game with 29 carries for 272 rushing yards and four rushing touchdowns. On October 27, in a win over Florida State, he had 33 carries for 149 yards and a touchdown. In the following game, against North Carolina State, he had 36 carries for 196 yards and one touchdown. One week later, he had 24 carries for 200 yards and two touchdowns against Connecticut. In the following game, in a road victory over Syracuse, he had 23 carries for 193 yards and three touchdowns. In the Pinstripe Bowl against Iowa, he had 32 carries for 157 yards and a touchdown in the 27–20 loss. As a freshman at Boston College in 2017, Dillon played in all 13 games and rushed for a freshman school record 1,589 yards on 300 carries with 14 touchdowns. He was named the Atlantic Coast Conference (ACC) Rookie of the Year.

=== 2018 season ===
In the Eagles' second game, against Holy Cross, Dillon had 149 yards and three touchdowns on only six carries. In the following game, he had 33 carries for 185 yards and one touchdown in a road victory over Wake Forest. Against Temple on September 29, he had 28 carries for 161 yards and two touchdowns but suffered an ankle injury. Nearly a month later, he returned and had 32 carries for 149 yards and a touchdown against Miami. On November 17, on the road against Florida State, he had 37 carries for 116 yards and two touchdowns. Despite being somewhat limited due to the ankle injury he suffered against Temple, Dillon still recorded 1,149 total yards and 11 touchdowns, making him the first player in Boston College history to post back-to-back 1,000-yard seasons. The Eagles officially did not make the postseason, as the First Responder Bowl against Boise State was declared a no-contest after lightning early in the game.

=== 2019 season ===
On September 7, against Richmond in the Eagles' second game, Dillon had two rushing touchdowns and a receiving touchdown in the victory. He had 27 carries for 151 yards and a touchdown in the next game against Kansas. In the next game, a road victory over Rutgers, he had 32 carries for 150 rushing yards and two rushing touchdowns. One week later, he had 23 carries for 159 rushing yards against Wake Forest. One week later, against Louisville, he had 22 carries for 118 yards and a 36-yard reception in the road loss. Two weeks later, against North Carolina State, he had 34 carries for 223 yards and three touchdowns. In a game against Clemson on October 26, Dillon scored his 34th touchdown at Boston College with a 9-yard rush in the second quarter that tied him with Keith Barnette for Eagles' career rushing touchdowns record. In the third quarter, Dillon rushed for another 9 yards for 3,739 career rushing yards that tied him with Andre Williams' record set in 2013. On November 2, in a road game against Syracuse, he had 35 carries for 242 yards and three touchdowns. One week later, he had 40 carries for 165 yards against Florida State. On November 30, in a road victory over Pitt, he had 32 carries for 178 yards and a touchdown. His 1,685 rushing yards led the ACC.

On December 10, 2019, Dillon gave up his senior year eligibility at Boston College and declared for the 2020 NFL draft. Dillon holds the program's all-time rushing record with 4,382 yards in three seasons and is 220 yards short of the Atlantic Coast Conference career rushing record. His 38 career rushing touchdowns, 40 total touchdowns and 4,618 all-purpose yards are also program records.

== Professional career ==
Pre-draft measurables
Height	Weight	Arm length	Hand span	Wingspan	40-yard dash	10-yard split	20-yard split	Three-cone drill	Vertical jump	Broad jump	Bench press
6 ft 0 3/8 in (1.84 m)	247 lb (112 kg)	31 5/8 in (0.80 m)	9 5/8 in (0.24 m)	6 ft 5 5/8 in (1.97 m)	4.53 s	1.53 s	2.69 s	7.19 s	41.0 in (1.04 m)	10 ft 11 in (3.33 m)	23 reps
All values from NFL Combine

=== Green Bay Packers ===
==== 2020 ====
Dillon was selected by the Green Bay Packers with the 62nd pick in the second round of the 2020 NFL draft. He signed his four-year rookie contract on July 1, 2020, worth $5.3 million, with a signing bonus of $1.4 million.

Head coach Matt LaFleur named Dillon the third running back on the Packers' depth chart to begin the season, behind veterans Aaron Jones and Jamaal Williams. He saw his first NFL action on September 13, 2020, during a Week 1 victory over the Minnesota Vikings, logging two carries for 14 yards in his NFL debut. Over the next six games, Dillon had a limited role with a few carries per game. The Packers placed Dillon on the reserve/COVID-19 list on November 2, 2020, where he missed five games. He was activated from the list on December 10, 2020, ahead of the Packers' Week 14 game versus the Lions, but Dillon did not record any stats in that game.

On December 27, 2020, Dillon scored his first two NFL touchdowns during a Week 16 game against the Tennessee Titans on Sunday Night Football, totaling 124 rushing yards on 21 carries during the 40–14 win. During the Packers' Divisional Round game against the Los Angeles Rams, Dillon rushed six times for 27 yards as Green Bay won 32–18, and had a fumble recovered by quarterback Aaron Rodgers. The following week against the Tampa Bay Buccaneers, Dillon rushed three times for 17 yards, and added one catch for 13 yards, as the Packers lost 31–26 in the NFC Championship.

In total, Dillon had 46 carries for 242 yards (an average of 5.3 yards per carry) and 2 touchdowns during his rookie season.

==== 2021 ====
After teammate Jamaal Williams left in free agency, Dillon was named the second-string running back to begin the season. Dillon had a slow start to the season, averaging just five carries a game through the first three weeks of the season. He saw his first significant action in a Week 4 victory over the Pittsburgh Steelers, tallying 15 carries for 81 yards, and catching one pass for 16 yards, as the Packers won 27–17. The following week versus the Cincinnati Bengals, Dillon saw 30 rushing yards on eight carries, and added four catches for 49 yards and a touchdown. The Packers won 25–22 in overtime.

Dillon tied a career-high 21 carries for 66 yards and two rushing touchdowns in a Week 10 victory over the Seattle Seahawks. In that same game, teammate Aaron Jones went down with an MCL injury. Dillon started the Packers' Week 11 game against the Vikings, notching 11 carries for 53 yards, and adding 6 catches for 44 yards, as the Packers lost 34–31. Dillon carried the ball 20 times for 69 yards against the Rams the following week, and caught 5 passes for 21 yards, as the Packers won 36–28. He recorded a 2-touchdown performance for the third time in his career in a 37–10 Week 16 victory over the Vikings, carrying the ball 14 times for 63 yards and adding two catches for 20 yards.

In the 2021 season, Dillon had 187 carries for 803 rushing yards and five rushing touchdowns to go along with 34 receptions for 313 receiving yards and two receiving touchdowns in 17 games and two starts.

In the Packers' Divisional Round loss to the San Francisco 49ers, Dillon had a rushing touchdown.

==== 2022 ====
In the 2022 season, Dillon appeared in all 17 games and started three. He finished with 186 carries for 770 rushing yards and seven rushing touchdowns to go along with 28 receptions for 206 receiving yards.

==== 2023 ====
Dillon played in 15 games with six starts in 2023, recording 613 rushing yards and two touchdowns, along with 22 catches for 223 yards.

==== 2024 ====
Dillon re-signed with the Packers on March 15, 2024 on a one-year qualifying offer, worth up to $2.575 million, but valued at just $1.125 million against the salary cap. On August 27, he was placed on injured reserve with a neck injury, officially ending his 2024 season.

=== Philadelphia Eagles ===
On March 13, 2025, Dillon signed a one-year contract with the Philadelphia Eagles. He appeared in seven games in the 2025 season.

=== Carolina Panthers ===
On March 18, 2026, Dillon signed a one-year contract with the Carolina Panthers.

== Career statistics ==
=== NFL ===
==== Regular season ====
Year	Team	Games		Rushing					Receiving					Fumbles	
Year	Team	GP	GS	Att	Yds	Avg	Lng	TD	Rec	Yds	Avg	Lng	TD	Fum	Lost
2020	GB	11	0	46	242	5.3	30	2	2	21	10.5	16	0	0	0
2021	GB	17	2	187	803	4.3	36	5	34	313	9.2	50	2	2	1
2022	GB	17	3	186	770	4.1	27	7	28	206	7.4	17	0	1	0
2023	GB	15	6	178	613	3.4	40	2	22	223	10.1	35	0	0	0
2024	GB	0	0	Did not play due to injury											
2025	PHI	7	0	12	60	5	11	0	3	21	7	11	0	1	1
2026	CAR	4	0	17	43	2.5	11	2	3	1.5	5	0	0	0	
Total		71	11	626	2,531	4.0	40	16	91	787	8.6	50	2	4	2
Source: pro-football-reference.com

==== Postseason ====
Year	Team	Games		Rushing					Receiving					Fumbles	
Year	Team	GP	GS	Att	Yds	Avg	Lng	TD	Rec	Yds	Avg	Lng	TD	Fum	Lost
2020	GB	2	0	9	44	4.9	9	0	1	13	13.0	13	0	1	0
2021	GB	1	0	7	25	3.6	6	1	0	0	0.0	0	0	0	0
2024	GB	0	0	Did not play due to injury											
2025	PHI	0	0	DNP											
Total		3	0	16	69	4.3	9	1	1	13	13.0	13	0	1	0
Source: pro-football-reference.com

=== College ===
Season	Team	Conf	G	Rushing				Receiving			
Season	Team	Conf	G	Att	Yds	Avg	TD	Rec	Yds	Avg	TD
2017	Boston College	ACC	13	300	1,589	5.3	14	0	0	0.0	0
2018	Boston College	ACC	10	227	1,108	4.9	10	8	41	5.1	1
2019	Boston College	ACC	12	318	1,685	5.3	14	13	195	15.0	1
Career			35	845	4,382	5.2	38	21	236	11.2	2
Source: sports-reference.com

== Personal life ==
Dillon is African-American and Jewish. His grandfather, Thom Gatewood, was an All-American college football player at the University of Notre Dame and the captain of the 1972 team as well as a member of the College Football Hall of Fame.

Dillon has co-hosted the "Toonen to Dillon" podcast with Will Toonen from December 2021 to April 2022. He married Toonen's sister Gabrielle on June 25, 2022.

Dillon is an avid promoter of Door County, Wisconsin, having first visited there after he started playing in Green Bay. In November 2021 he was given the key to Door County by Destination Door County, being the only person to receive the honor. Dillon married his wife, Gabrielle, on June 25, 2022, in Door County. On May 2, 2023, his wife gave birth to their first child, who shares the same birthday as Dillon.

== See also ==
- List of select Jewish American Football players
