= Josey Jewell =

American football player (born 1994)

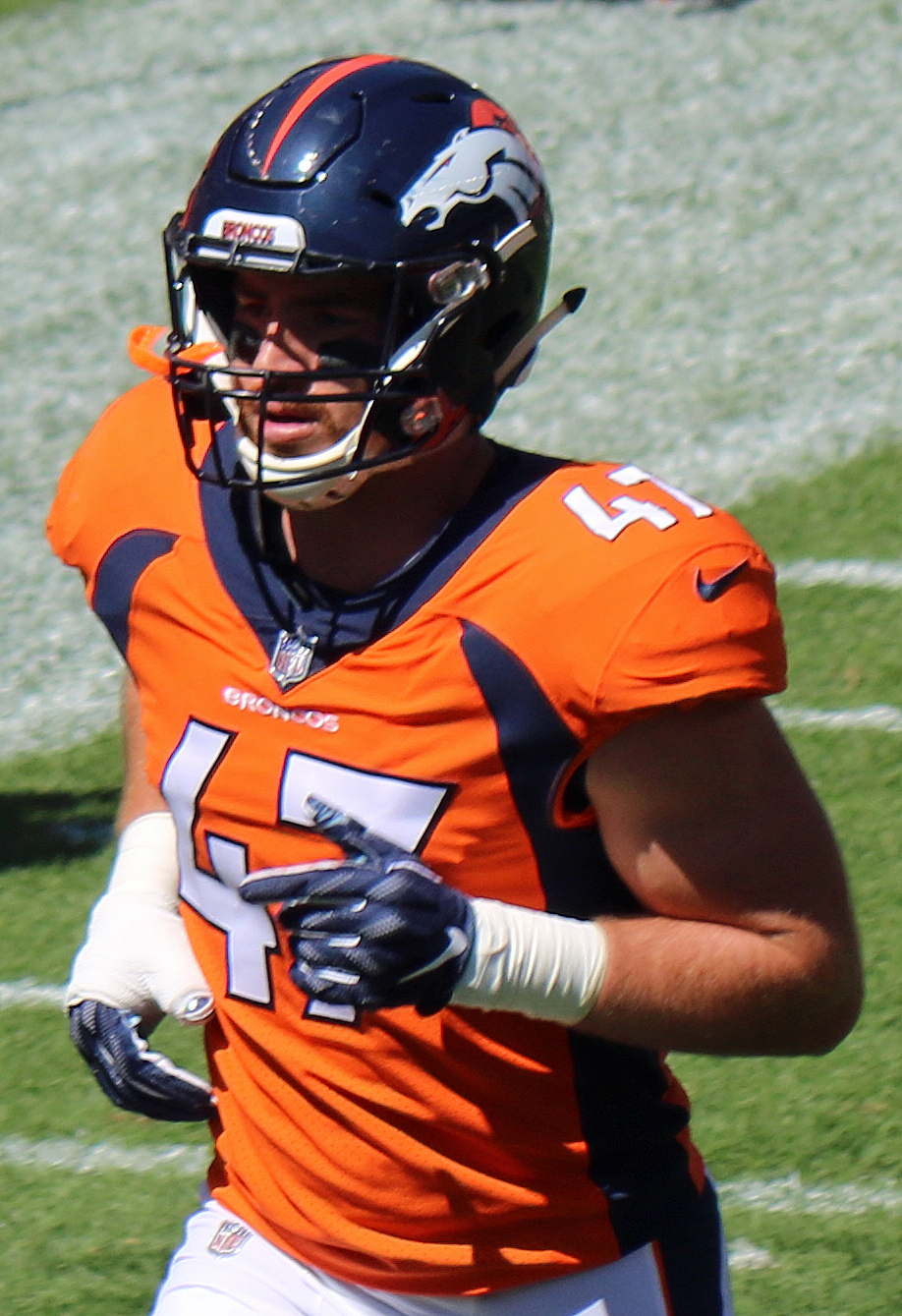
- Jewell with the Denver Broncos in 2018

Profile
- Position: Linebacker

Personal information
- Born: December 25, 1994 (age 31); Decorah, Iowa, U.S.
- Listed height: 6 ft 1 in (1.85 m)
- Listed weight: 236 lb (107 kg)

Career information
- High school: Decorah
- College: Iowa (2013–2017)
- NFL draft: 2018: 4th round, 106th overall pick

Career history
- Denver Broncos (2018–2023); Carolina Panthers (2024)

Awards and highlights
- Lott Trophy (2017); Jack Lambert Trophy (2017); Unanimous All-American (2017); Big Ten Defensive Player of the Year (2017); Big Ten Linebacker of the Year (2017); First-team All-Big Ten (2017); 2× Second-team All-Big Ten (2015, 2016)

Career NFL statistics as of 2024
- Total tackles: 550
- Sacks: 12.5
- Forced fumbles: 5
- Fumble recoveries: 9
- Interceptions: 3
- Pass deflections: 22
- Stats at Pro Football Reference

Josey Jewell (born December 25, 1994) is an American professional football linebacker. He played college football for the Iowa Hawkeyes, where he was a unanimous All-American and a three-time All-Big Ten selection. He was selected by the Denver Broncos in the 2018 NFL draft. He has also played for the Carolina Panthers.

== Early life ==
Jewell attended Decorah High School in Decorah, Iowa, where he played high school football as a linebacker and running back. Jewell helped his team appear in back-to-back 3A State Title Games, defeating Sioux City Bishop Heelan by a score of 49–21 in the 2012 game. His senior year, he finished the season with 1314 rushing yards, 21 rushing touchdowns, and 81 total tackles. Josey Jewell was rated as a two-star prospect by 247Sports with a composite score of .7783. He committed to the University of Iowa to play college football.

== College career ==
After redshirting his first year at Iowa in 2013, Jewell played in 11 games and made four starts in 2014. He finished the season with 51 tackles and one sack. As a sophomore in 2015, he started all 14 games and led the team with 126 tackles, three sacks, and four interceptions. As a junior in 2016, Jewell started all 13 games and again led the team with 124 tackles with 1.5 sacks. He was second-team All-Big Ten for the second straight season, and a finalist for the Butkus Award. As a senior in 2017, Jewell was named a unanimous All-American. He also won the Jack Lambert Award, was a finalist for the Bronko Nagurski Trophy, and was named the Big Ten Defensive Player of the Year after leading the Big Ten with 125 tackles.

=== Statistics ===
Year	GP	Tackles	For Loss	Sacks	Int	Yards	TD	Passes Def	FR	FF
2014	11	51	1	1	0	0	0	0	0	0
2015	14	126	7.5	3	4	63	1	6	1	1
2016	13	124	6	1.5	0	0	0	9	0	1
2017	12	136	13.5	4.5	2	37	0	11	1	1
Totals	50	437	28	10	6	100	1	26	2	3

== Professional career ==
Pre-draft measurables
Height	Weight	Arm length	Hand span	40-yard dash	10-yard split	20-yard split	20-yard shuttle	Three-cone drill	Vertical jump	Broad jump	Bench press
6 ft 1 in (1.85 m)	234 lb (106 kg)	32 in (0.81 m)	10 in (0.25 m)	4.79 s	1.75 s	2.76 s	4.27 s	6.80 s	35.0 in (0.89 m)	9 ft 9 in (2.97 m)	22 reps
All values from NFL Combine/Pro Day

=== Denver Broncos ===
The Denver Broncos selected Jewell in the fourth round (106th overall) of the 2018 NFL draft. Jewell was the 14th linebacker drafted in 2018.

On May 10, 2018, the Denver Broncos signed Jewell to a four-year, $3.17 million contract that includes a signing bonus of $713,982.

He entered training camp and competed for a role as a backup inside linebacker against Zaire Anderson, Joseph Jones, Jerrol Garcia-Williams, and Keishawn Bierria.

In his second career NFL regular season game versus the Oakland Raiders, Jewell recorded two combined tackles.

In Week 4 of the 2020 season against the New York Jets on Thursday Night Football, Jewell recorded a team high ten tackles and sacked Sam Darnold twice during the 37–28 win.

On September 21, 2021, Jewell was placed on injured reserve with a pectoral injury.

On March 15, 2022, Jewell signed a two-year contract extension with the Broncos.

On December 11, 2022, Jewell recorded two interceptions and nine tackles in a 34–28 loss to the Kansas City Chiefs.

=== Carolina Panthers ===
On March 13, 2024, Jewell signed a three-year, $22.75 million contract with the Carolina Panthers. On July 22, 2025, Jewell was released by the Panthers due to health concerns surrounding lingering concussion symptoms.

== NFL career statistics ==
Legend
**Bold**	Career high

=== Regular season ===
Year	Team	Games		Tackles				Fumbles				Interceptions					
Year	Team	GP	GS	Cmb	Solo	Ast	Sck	FF	FR	Yds	TD	Int	Yds	Avg	Lng	TD	PD
2018	DEN	16	9	58	38	20	0.0	0	0	0	0	0	0	0.0	0	0	3
2019	DEN	15	3	38	21	17	1.5	0	2	0	0	0	0	0.0	0	0	0
2020	DEN	16	16	113	67	46	2.0	0	0	0	0	0	0	0.0	0	0	4
2021	DEN	2	2	8	7	2	0.0	1	0	0	0	0	0	0.0	0	0	1
2022	DEN	13	13	**128**	**70**	**58**	2.5	**2**	2	5	0	**2**	**21**	**10.5**	**21**	0	4
2023	DEN	16	15	108	60	48	3.0	**2**	**3**	**10**	0	0	0	0.0	0	0	3
2024	CAR	12	12	97	51	46	**3.5**	0	2	0	0	1	0	0.0	0	0	**7**
Career		90	70	550	314	236	12.5	5	9	15	0	3	21	7	21	0	22
