= Easily Ltd =

- Type: Subsidiary
- Industry: Internet
- Founded: 1999
- Headquarters: UK
- Area served: Global
- Parent: NetNames Group
- Website: https://easily.uk/

Easily Ltd was once one of the UK’s largest domain name and webhosting companies.

== History ==
Easily Ltd was founded in September 1999 as Easywebnames by Steve Procter In 2004, Easily Ltd was acquired by London-listed Group NBT plc, Europe’s leading specialist domain name management company and one of the UK’s largest providers of website hosting services. In March 2003, Easily Ltd partnered with VeriSign to introduce Shared Hosting Security Services (SHSS). In 2006, Group NBT partnered with CM4all to add CM4all WebsiteCreator Business Edition to Easily Ltd’s services to help SME customers create websites.

== See also ==
- List of domain registrars
- Ivan Pope
- Nominet
