= Tommy Sweeney =

American football player (born 1995)

Profile
- Position: Tight end

Personal information
- Born: July 1, 1995 (age 31); Ramsey, New Jersey, U.S.
- Listed height: 6 ft 5 in (1.96 m)
- Listed weight: 255 lb (116 kg)

Career information
- High school: Don Bosco Prep (Ramsey, New Jersey)
- College: Boston College (2014–2018)
- NFL draft: 2019: 7th round, 228th overall pick

Career history
- Buffalo Bills (2019–2022); New York Giants (2023); Chicago Bears (2024)*
- * Offseason or practice squad member only

Awards and highlights
- First-team All-ACC (2018)

Career NFL statistics
- Receptions: 18
- Receiving yards: 165
- Receiving touchdowns: 1
- Stats at Pro Football Reference

Thomas R. Sweeney (born July 1, 1995) is an American professional football tight end. He played college football for the Boston College Eagles. He was drafted by the Buffalo Bills in the seventh round of the 2019 NFL draft.

== Early life ==
Sweeney grew up in Ramsey, New Jersey and attended Don Bosco Preparatory High School. He caught 27 passes for 539 yards and five touchdowns in his senior season.

== College career ==
Sweeney played five seasons for the Boston College Eagles, redshirting his freshman season. As a redshirt junior, he led the team with 36 receptions, 512 receiving yards, and four touchdown receptions and was named third-team All-Atlantic Coast Conference (ACC). He capped off the season with seven catches for 137 yards and a touchdown against Iowa in the 2017 Pinstripe Bowl. In his final season with the Eagles, Sweeney had 32 catches for 348 yards and three touchdowns and was named first-team All-ACC. Sweeney finished his collegiate career with 99 receptions for 1,281 yards and 10 touchdowns in 38 career games.

== Professional career ==
Pre-draft measurables
Height	Weight	Arm length	Hand span	40-yard dash	10-yard split	20-yard split	20-yard shuttle	Three-cone drill	Vertical jump	Broad jump	Bench press
6 ft 4 1/2 in (1.94 m)	251 lb (114 kg)	32 3/4 in (0.83 m)	9 3/4 in (0.25 m)	4.83 s	1.59 s	2.82 s	4.31 s	7.17 s	32.0 in (0.81 m)	9 ft 7 in (2.92 m)	17 reps
All values from NFL Combine/Pro Day

=== Buffalo Bills ===
Sweeney was drafted by the Buffalo Bills in the seventh round (228th overall) of the 2019 NFL draft. He signed a rookie contract with the team on May 9, 2019.

Sweeney made his NFL debut in the on September 8, 2019, in the Bills season opener, catching two passes for 35 yards in a 17–16 win over the New York Jets. Sweeney caught eight passes for 114 yards in six games played as a rookie.

Sweeney was placed on the active/physically unable to perform list (PUP) by the Bills due to a foot injury on July 28, 2020. He was placed on the reserve/PUP list to start the season on September 5, 2020. He was moved to the reserve/COVID-19 list by the team on October 24, 2020, and was activated back to the PUP list on November 11. However, he developed myocarditis as a result of the virus and was ruled out for the rest of the season. He was placed back on the reserve/COVID-19 list on November 23, 2020. In April 2021, Bills general manager Brandon Beane announced that Sweeney should be ready for the 2021 season. Sweeney returned to the field in June 2021, when it was revelated that at one point in time, it was unknown if he'd be able to play again.

On October 18, 2021, Sweeney caught his first career touchdown in a loss to the Tennessee Titans.

=== New York Giants ===
On March 23, 2023, Sweeney signed with the New York Giants. On August 23, Sweeney collapsed on the practice field as the result of a 'medical event.' He was placed on reserve/non-football injury list six days later, and did not play for the Giants in 2023. Sweeney was released by New York on November 28.

=== Chicago Bears ===
On May 13, 2024, Sweeney signed with the Chicago Bears. He was released on August 24, and re-signed to the practice squad on October 9.

== NFL career statistics ==
Legend
**Bold**	Career high

=== Regular season ===
Year	Team	Games		Receiving					Fumbles	
Year	Team	GP	GS	Rec	Yds	Y/R	Lng	TD	Fum	Lost
2019	BUF	6	1	8	**114**	**14.3**	**29**	0	0	0
2020	BUF	Did not play due to injury								
2021	BUF	**13**	**3**	**9**	44	4.9	13	**1**	**1**	0
2022	BUF	5	0	1	7	7.0	7	0	0	0
Career		24	4	18	165	9.2	29	1	1	0

=== Postseason ===
Year	Team	Games		Receiving					Fumbles	
Year	Team	GP	GS	Rec	Yds	Y/R	Lng	TD	Fum	Lost
2019	BUF	Did not play								
2020	BUF	Did not play due to injury								
2021	BUF	Did not play								
2022	BUF	Did not play								
Career		—	—	—	—	—	—	—	—	—
