= Justice Easley =

Justice Easley may refer to:

- Charles Easley (born 1949), associate justice of the Mississippi Supreme Court
- Mack Easley (1916–2006), associate justice of the New Mexico Supreme Court
