= Aeris Williams =

American football player (born 1995)

No. 26
- Position: Running back

Personal information
- Born: August 9, 1995 (age 31); Racine, Wisconsin, U.S.
- Listed height: 6 ft 1 in (1.85 m)
- Listed weight: 215 lb (98 kg)

Career information
- High school: West Point (West Point, Mississippi)
- College: Mississippi State (2015–2018)
- Stats at ESPN

Aeris Williams (born August 9, 1995) is an American former football running back for Mississippi State.

== Early life ==
Williams was a 4-star recruit out of West Point High School after being named the Mississippi Association of Coaches 5A Offensive Player of the Year and WCBI-TV Offensive Player of the Year following a 1,697 rushing yards, 21 touchdown campaign his senior year. He was named to the Alabama-Mississippi All-Star Classic and was a 2014 U.S. Army All-American Bowl nominee.

== College career ==
During his junior season, Williams was the Bulldogs' first running back 1,000-yard rusher since 2014, when he put up 1,107 on 236 attempts. He finished his MSU career with 2,557 yards and a 5.1 yards/carry average.

STATS	ATT	YDS	AVG	TD	LNG	REC	YDS	AVG	TD	LNG	FUM	LST
2018	85	524	6.2	3	29	9	100	11.1	1	27	0	0
2017	236	1,107	4.7	6	59	16	142	8.9	0	28	0	0
2016	137	720	5.3	4	36	7	45	6.4	0	24	0	0
2015	40	206	5.2	3	33	6	18	3	0	9	0	0
TOTAL	498	2,557	5.1	16	157	38	305	29.4	1	88	0	0

Williams was invited to and participated in the 2019 College Gridiron Showcase college football all-star event.
