= Michael Easley =

Michael Easley may refer to:

- Michael J. Easley (born 1957), president of Moody Bible Institute 2005–2008
- Michael F. Easley Jr., American lawyer
- Mike Easley (born 1950), governor of North Carolina 2001–2009
