= Kylin Hill =

American football player (born 1998)

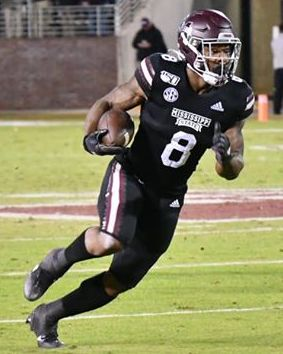
- Hill with the Mississippi State Bulldogs in 2019

Profile
- Position: Running back

Personal information
- Born: August 18, 1998 (age 28); Columbus, Mississippi, U.S.
- Listed height: 5 ft 10 in (1.78 m)
- Listed weight: 214 lb (97 kg)

Career information
- High school: Columbus
- College: Mississippi State (2017–2020)
- NFL draft: 2021: 7th round, 256th overall pick

Career history
- Green Bay Packers (2021–2022); Orlando Guardians (2024)*; Ottawa Redblacks (2024)*; Calgary Stampeders (2024); Houston Gamblers (2026)*
- * Offseason or practice squad member only

Awards and highlights
- Conerly Trophy (2019); Second-team All-SEC (2019)

Career NFL statistics
- Rushing yards: 31
- Rushing average: 2.8
- Receptions: 1
- Receiving yards: 5
- Return yards: 199
- Stats at Pro Football Reference

Kylin Jatavian Hill (born August 18, 1998) is an American professional football running back. He played college football at Mississippi State, and was selected by the Green Bay Packers of the National Football League (NFL) in the seventh round of the 2021 NFL draft.

== Early life ==
Hill attended Columbus High School in Columbus, Mississippi. He was The Commercial Dispatch Offensive Player of the Year both his junior and senior years. He committed to Mississippi State University to play college football.

== College career ==
Hill played in all 13 games as a true freshman at Mississippi State in 2017. He rushed for 393 yards on 78 carries with two touchdowns. As a sophomore in 2018 he became the starter. He started all 11 games he played in, missing two due to injury, and rushed for 734 yards on 117 carries with four touchdowns. Hill returned as the starter in 2019. He starred for the Bulldogs in 2019, earning second-team all-conference honors with 1,350 yards rushing and 10 scores on 242 carries (5.6 per) in 13 starts (also 18 receptions for 180 yards and one touchdown). With that impressive performance Hill won the 2019 Conerly Trophy, awarded to the top player in the state of Mississippi. In 2020 Hill opted out from NCAA football after three starts (15 carries, 58 yards, 3.9 yards per carry; 23 receptions, 237 yards, 10.3 average, one touchdown).

== Professional career ==
Pre-draft measurables
Height	Weight	Arm length	Hand span	40-yard dash	10-yard split	20-yard split	20-yard shuttle	Three-cone drill	Vertical jump	Broad jump	Bench press
5 ft 10 1/2 in (1.79 m)	214 lb (97 kg)	30 1/2 in (0.77 m)	9 3/4 in (0.25 m)	4.57 s	1.60 s	2.65 s	4.35 s	7.20 s	36.0 in (0.91 m)	10 ft 2 in (3.10 m)	22 reps
All values from Pro Day

=== Green Bay Packers ===
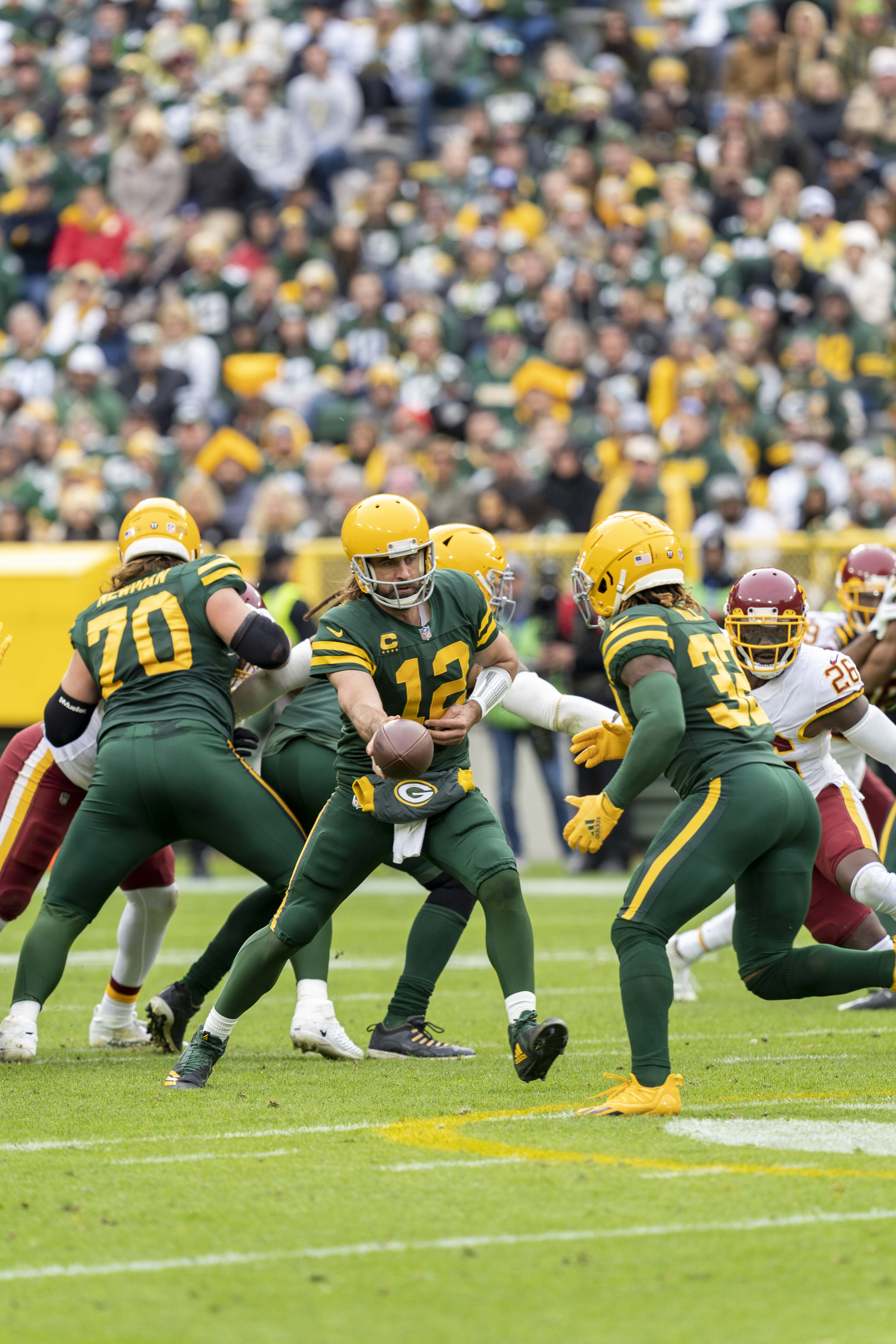
Hill receiving a handoff from Aaron Rodgers in 2021

On May 1, 2021, Hill was selected in the seventh round of the 2021 NFL draft by the Green Bay Packers as the 256th pick. On May 13, Packers signed Hill to his four-year rookie contract, worth $3.55 million. He saw his first NFL action on September 12, against the New Orleans Saints, logging five carries for 14 yards during the 38–3 loss. On October 28, Hill suffered a season-ending injury to his right knee during the Packers' Week 8 game against the Arizona Cardinals. He was placed on injured reserve on November 1.

On August 23, 2022, Hill was placed on the reserve/physically unable to perform (PUP) list to start the season. On November 2, Hill was activated from the PUP list and waived on November 15.

=== Orlando Guardians ===
On November 2, 2023, Hill signed with the Orlando Guardians of the XFL. The Guardians folded when the XFL and United States Football League merged to create the United Football League (UFL).

=== Ottawa Redblacks ===
On February 25, 2024, Hill signed with the Ottawa Redblacks of the Canadian Football League (CFL). On June 1, he was moved to the practice roster prior to the start of the regular season. Hill was released by Ottawa on July 2.

=== Calgary Stampeders ===
On July 31, 2024, Hill was signed by the Calgary Stampeders of the CFL. He played in four games where he had 102 rushing yards, 127 receiving yards, and one touchdown. Hill was released in the following offseason on March 19, 2025.

=== Houston Roughnecks ===
On September 4, 2025, Hill signed with the Houston Roughnecks of the UFL.

== NFL career statistics ==
=== Regular season ===
Year	Team	Games		Rushing					Receiving					Fumbles	
Year	Team	GP	GS	Att	Yds	Avg	Lng	TD	Rec	Yds	Avg	Lng	TD	Fum	Lost
2021	GB	8	0	10	24	2.4	8	0	1	5	5.0	5	0	0	0
2022	GB	2	0	1	7	7.0	7	0	0	0	0.0	0	0	0	0
Total		10	0	11	31	2.8	8	0	1	5	5.0	5	0	0	0
Source: pro-football-reference.com

== Personal life ==
While a player at Mississippi State in 2020, Hill responded to Mississippi governor Tate Reeves's opposition to replacing the state flag by posting on Twitter, "Either change the flag or I won’t be representing this State anymore 100% & I meant that .. I’m tired." His public stance was cited as pivotal in the Mississippi state legislature's decision the following week to adopt a new flag that did not incorporate the Confederate battle flag.
