= Nick Easley =

American football player (born 1997)

No. 86
- Position: Wide receiver

Personal information
- Born: January 14, 1997 (age 29); Newton, Iowa, U.S.
- Listed height: 6 ft 0 in (1.83 m)
- Listed weight: 205 lb (93 kg)

Career information
- High school: Newton
- College: Iowa Western CC; Iowa
- NFL draft: 2019: undrafted

Career history
- Buffalo Bills (2019–2020)*
- * Offseason or practice squad member only
- Stats at Pro Football Reference

Nick Easley (born January 14, 1997) is an American former football wide receiver. He played college football at Iowa and was signed by the Buffalo Bills as an undrafted free agent in 2019.

== Early life ==
Easley attended Newton Senior High School in Newton, Iowa, where he played wide receiver, kicker and punter for the football team. In his junior season in 2013, Easley was an all-district selection. His senior year, Easley was a captain and earned second-team all-state honors as a wide receiver and was a third-team selection as a kicker, in addition to being first-team all-district for the second year in a row. Easley holds a slew of football records at the high school, including most career receiving yards, as well as the most touchdowns in a game, season, and career. He also played varsity basketball for three years.

Easley was underrecruited, and only received an offer to play at one college, Missouri Western, which wanted him to walk-on as a kicker. Easley decided to attend Iowa Western Community College in Council Bluffs.

== College career ==
=== Iowa Western Community College ===
Easley was a first-team all-conference receiver as a freshman and sophomore, leading the team to a bowl game in consecutive seasons. In 2016, he had a standout sophomore season, earning NJCAA All-America honors by tallying 954 receiving yards, the second-most in school history for a single season.

Easley received scholarship offers from three FCS schools, Robert Morris, Southern Illinois, and Western Illinois, but accepted an offer to walk-on at Iowa.

=== Iowa ===
In 25 games over two seasons at the University of Iowa, Easley caught 103 passes for 1,024 yards and nine touchdowns. During his senior season in 2018, Easley was eighth in receptions in the Big Ten with 52. Easley was named MVP of the 2019 Outback Bowl after catching eight passes for 104 yards and two touchdowns.

Easley majored in secondary education.

=== College statistics ===
| Year | Team | GP | Receiving | | |
| Year | Team | GP | Rec | Yards | TDs |
|---|---|---|---|---|---|
| 2017 | Iowa | 13 | 51 | 530 | 4 |
| 2018 | Iowa | 12 | 52 | 494 | 5 |
| Totals | | 25 | 103 | 1,024 | 9 |

== Professional career ==
Pre-draft measurables
| Height | Weight | Arm length | Hand span | 40-yard dash | 10-yard split | 20-yard split | 20-yard shuttle | Three-cone drill | Vertical jump | Broad jump | Bench press |
|---|---|---|---|---|---|---|---|---|---|---|---|
| 5 ft 11 1/4 in (1.81 m) | 203 lb (92 kg) | 30 7/8 in (0.78 m) | 9 in (0.23 m) | 4.64 s | 1.57 s | 2.65 s | 4.08 s | 6.80 s | 36.0 in (0.91 m) | 10 ft 0 in (3.05 m) | 8 reps |
All values from 2019 Iowa Pro Day

=== Buffalo Bills ===
On April 27, following the conclusion of the 2019 NFL draft, Easley signed with the Buffalo Bills as an undrafted free agent. On August 31, Easley was released as part of the team's final roster cuts. On October 1, 2019, Easley was signed to the Buffalo Bills practice squad. On January 6, 2020, Easley was signed to a reserve/future contract.

On August 16, 2020, Easley was waived by the Bills.
