= Nate Stanley =

American football player (born 1997)

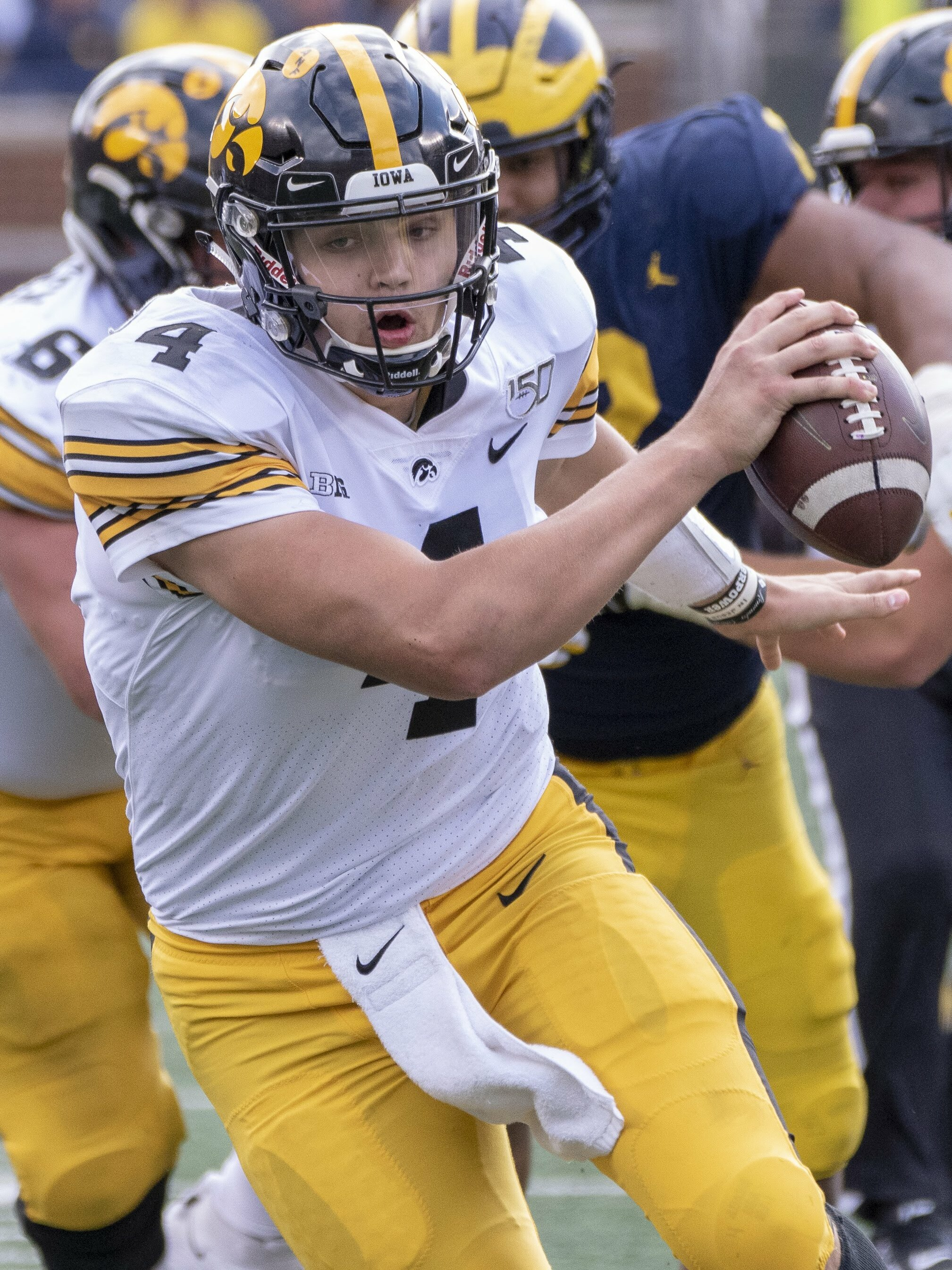
- Stanley with the Iowa Hawkeyes in 2019

No. 7, 14
- Position: Quarterback

Personal information
- Born: August 26, 1997 (age 29); Menomonie, Wisconsin, U.S.
- Listed height: 6 ft 4 in (1.93 m)
- Listed weight: 235 lb (107 kg)

Career information
- High school: Menomonie
- College: Iowa (2016–2019)
- NFL draft: 2020: 7th round, 244th overall pick

Career history
- Minnesota Vikings (2020–2021)
- Stats at Pro Football Reference

Nathan Stanley (born August 26, 1997) is an American former football quarterback. He played college football for the Iowa Hawkeyes and was selected by the Minnesota Vikings in the seventh round of the 2020 NFL draft, with whom he spent two seasons.

== Early life ==
Stanley attended Menomonie High School in Menomonie, Wisconsin. During his career, he had 3,674 yards and 36 touchdowns. He committed to the University of Iowa to play college football. Stanley also played baseball and basketball in high school. He set Menomonie High School’s basketball record for most varsity points. He still holds the record to this day.

== College career ==
Stanley spent his freshman season at Iowa as a backup to C. J. Beathard. He appeared in five games, completing five of nine passes for 62 yards. With Beathard graduating, Stanley was named Iowa's starting quarterback in 2017. In his first career start, he passed for 125 yards and three touchdowns. Stanley started 39 consecutive games compiling a 27–12 record, including a 3–0 record in bowl games. He finished his career second all-time in passing yards and touchdowns in Iowa football history.

=== Statistics ===
Year	Team	Games			Passing							Rushing			
Year	Team	GP	GS	Record	Cmp	Att	Yds	Pct	TD	Int	Rtg	Att	Yds	Avg	TD
2016	Iowa	5	0	—	5	9	62	55.6	0	0	113.4	0	0	0.0	0
2017	Iowa	13	13	8–5	196	351	2,437	55.8	26	6	135.2	49	−115	−2.3	0
2018	Iowa	13	13	9–4	235	396	2,852	59.3	26	10	136.5	36	4	0.1	1
2019	Iowa	13	13	10–3	237	399	2,951	59.4	16	7	131.2	76	7	0.1	1
Career		44	39	27–12	673	1,155	8,302	58.3	68	23	134.1	161	-104	-0.6	2

== Professional career ==
Pre-draft measurables
Height	Weight	Arm length	Hand span	Wingspan	40-yard dash	10-yard split	20-yard split	20-yard shuttle	Three-cone drill	Vertical jump	Broad jump	Wonderlic
6 ft 3 3/4 in (1.92 m)	235 lb (107 kg)	32 5/8 in (0.83 m)	10 in (0.25 m)	6 ft 6 1/4 in (1.99 m)	4.81 s	1.65 s	2.79 s	4.48 s	7.26 s	28.5 in (0.72 m)	9 ft 0 in (2.74 m)	40
All values from NFL Combine

Stanley was selected by the Minnesota Vikings in the seventh round with the 244th overall pick of the 2020 NFL draft. He was waived by the Vikings during final roster cuts on September 5, 2020, and was signed to the practice squad the next day. He signed a reserve/future contract with the Vikings on January 4, 2021.

On August 31, 2021, Stanley was waived/injured by the Vikings and placed on injured reserve with an undisclosed injury. On July 19, 2022, Stanley was cut by the Vikings.

On April 29, 2023, Stanley confirmed that he was retired from football and would focus on teaching the sport rather than playing.

== Personal life ==
Stanley is a Christian. He also enjoys hunting, fishing, and woodworking.
