= Iowa Hawkeyes football =

University of Iowa football team

Iowa Hawkeyes
2026 Iowa Hawkeyes football team
- First season: 1889; 137 years ago
- Athletic director: Beth Goetz
- General manager: Tyler Barnes
- Head coach: Kirk Ferentz; 28th season, 218–130 (.626)
- Location: Iowa City, Iowa
- Stadium: Kinnick Stadium (capacity: 69,250)
- Field: Duke Slater Field
- NCAA division: Division I FBS
- Conference: Big Ten
- Colors: Black and gold
- All-time record: 718–587–39 (.549)
- Bowl record: 19–18–1 (.513)

National championships
- Claimed: 1921, 1922, 1956, 1958, 1960

Conference championships
- WIUFA: 1896 Big Ten: 1900, 1907, 1921, 1922, 1956, 1958, 1960, 1981, 1985, 1990, 2002, 2004 MVC: 1907

Division championships
- Big Ten West: 2015, 2021, 2023
- Heisman winners: Nile Kinnick – 1939
- Consensus All-Americans: 37
- Rivalries: Iowa State (rivalry); Nebraska (rivalry); Minnesota (rivalry); Wisconsin (rivalry); Illinois (rivalry)

Uniforms
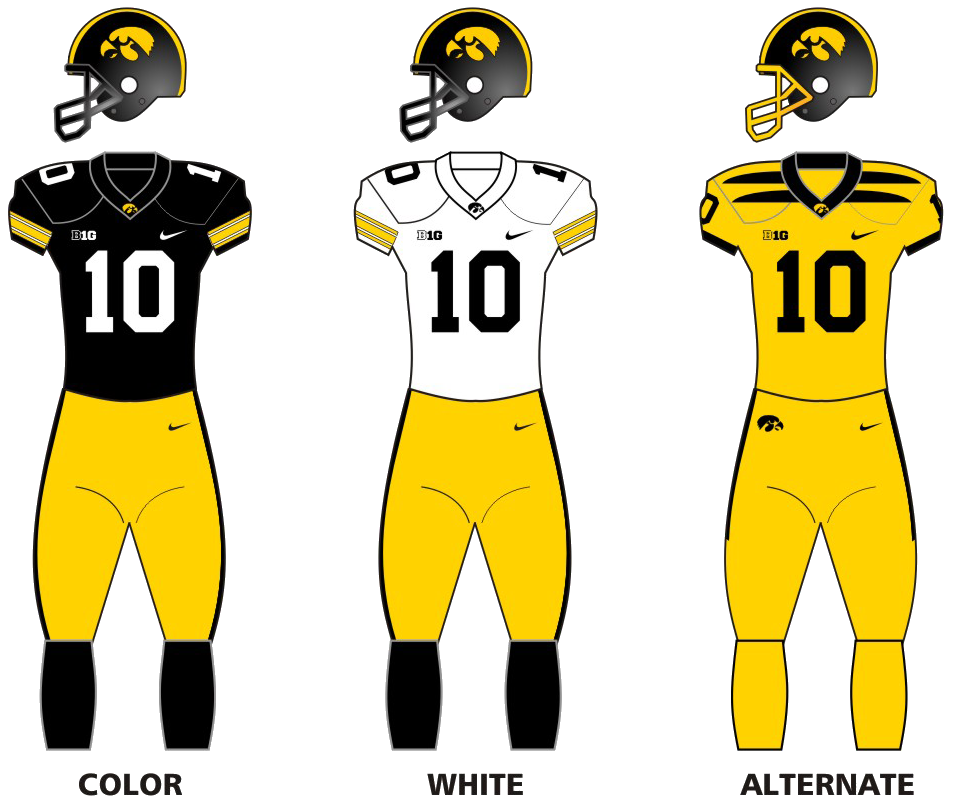
- Fight song: Iowa Fight Song
- Mascot: Herky the Hawk
- Marching band: Hawkeye Marching Band
- Outfitter: Nike
- Website: hawkeyesports.com

The Iowa Hawkeyes football program represents the University of Iowa in college football. The Hawkeyes compete in the Big Ten Conference. Iowa joined the Conference (then known as the Western Conference or Big Nine) in 1899 and played their first Conference football season in 1900. They are a Division I Football Bowl Subdivision (FBS) member of the National Collegiate Athletic Association (NCAA). The Hawkeyes play their home games in Iowa City, Iowa, at Kinnick Stadium, with a capacity of 69,250. The Hawkeyes are coached by Kirk Ferentz, who is in his 28th season as the head coach and is the longest current tenured head coach in NCAA Division I FBS. The Hawkeyes have won 13 conference championships (including 11 in the Big Ten). Iowa has been ranked #1 in the AP and Coaches Poll 15 times.

== History of the team ==
=== Early history ===
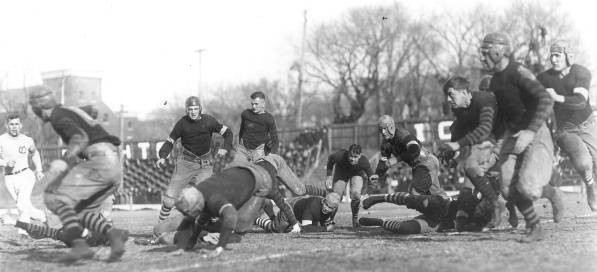
Iowa plays Nebraska on November 25, 1916.

Football was first played as a club sport at Iowa in 1872, with intramural games against other colleges played as early as 1882, but it was not until 1889 that the University of Iowa first officially recognized a varsity football team. Beginning in 1892, Iowa played for six seasons as a member of the Western Interstate University Football Association against three other Midwestern flagship state universities. In 1899, again playing as an independent, Iowa completed its first undefeated football season, which led to an invitation to join the Western Conference, now known as the Big Ten Conference. In 1900, the Hawkeyes finished another undefeated season and won a share of the Western Conference title in their first year of conference play. In 1907, Iowa helped form the new Missouri Valley Intercollegiate Athletic Association with the other three university members of the former WIUFA and participated in football in the new league, while retaining its existing membership in the Western Conference. Iowa tied for the league championship in the first season of competition, but would leave the conference soon thereafter to return to sole competition in the Western Conference.

=== Howard Jones era and 1920s ===
Iowa claimed consecutive Big Ten titles in 1921 and 1922, and were recognized as national champions in those years. The Hawkeyes won 20 straight games in the early 1920s under the guidance of Hall of Fame coach Howard Jones. But Jones soon left Iowa and established a powerhouse at Southern California, and the Hawkeyes were abysmal for most of the 1930s.

=== 1929 Big Ten suspension ===
Iowa was expelled from the Big Ten on May 25, 1929. The reasons were officially unstated and university president Walter Jessup professed not to know why the faculty committee voted to expel the university. Suspicions of player compensation and Iowa's inaction to address alleged ethics violations appear to have been the main cause. Following the 1929 season, the Big Ten faculty committee unanimously voted to reinstate Iowa to the conference on February 1, 1930. On December 11, 1929, Iowa had disqualified 27 players, presumably due to compensation issues, and was advised not to seek reinstatement of any of those players.

=== Eddie Anderson era (1939–1942, 1946–1949) ===
Little was expected of Iowa's 1939 team based upon its overall record in the decade, but led by their new coach Eddie Anderson the team exceeded expectations and had a glorious run. Nicknamed the "Ironmen" because a small number of players shouldered the brunt of the time played, the 1939 Hawkeyes scored several upset victories and vaulted into the national rankings. Though Iowa fell a game short of winning the Big Ten title, team MVP Nile Kinnick won almost every major national award, including the 1939 Heisman Trophy.

=== Forest Evashevski era (1952–1960) ===
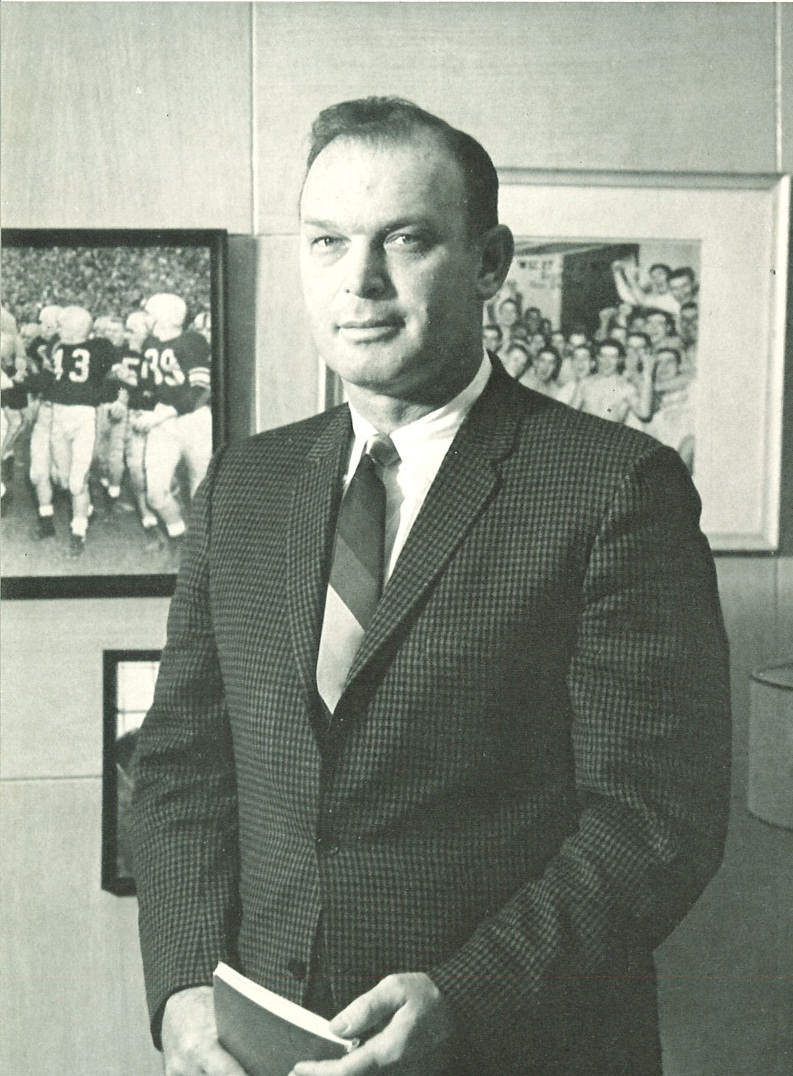
Coach Forest Evashevski

Forest Evashevski was hired as Iowa's head coach in 1952. He lured Calvin Jones to Iowa, where Jones became the first Hawkeye – and the first African-American – to win the Outland Trophy in 1955. From 1956 to 1960, Evashevski led Iowa to four finishes in the top five of the national rankings, three Big Ten Conference titles, two Rose Bowl victories (in 1957 and 1959), and the 1958 FWAA national championship. After the 1960 season, Evashevski left coaching to become Iowa's athletic director.

==== The Forgotten Season ====
In 1960 the Hawkeyes held on to the No. 1 ranking for much of the season. The Hawkeyes defeated No. 8 Ohio State, No. 15 Michigan State, and No. 10 Purdue. Iowa lost to rival No. 3 Minnesota. The game was the only loss of the year for the 1960 Hawkeyes and they shared the Big Ten title with Minnesota. However, at that time, the Big Ten did not allow their teams to go to any bowl except for the Rose Bowl. As such, Minnesota was picked over Iowa to go to Pasadena and Iowa was left out, despite a No. 2 ranking in the Coaches' Poll and a No. 3 ranking in the AP. Minnesota went on to win the National Championship, as the final AP poll was conducted before their Rose Bowl loss to Washington. This season is known as the "Forgotten Season", for despite ending the season with a No. 2/3 ranking and a share of the Big Ten title, the Hawks were left out of January play.

=== 1960s and 70s ===
Evashevski's departure from the sidelines began a two-decade downturn in Iowa's fortunes. Jerry Burns coached from 1961 though 1965. He had a 16–27–2 record. His first team finished 5–4, which would be Iowa's last winning record for 20 years. Ray Nagel followed from 1966 to 1970 with a 16–32–2 record. A 3-3-2 record in 1963 and consecutive 5–5 records in 1968 and 1969 would be the Hawks' only non-losing records from 1962 to 1980. Frank Lauterbur followed, coaching from 1971 to 1973 with a 4–28–1 record, with a 0–11 record in 1973. Bob Commings coached the Hawkeyes from 1974 to 1978. His record was 18 wins and 37 losses.

=== Hayden Fry era (1979–1998) ===
Hall of Fame coach Hayden Fry was hired after the 1978 season to reverse Iowa's fortunes. Considering the awful state of the program upon his arrival, Fry didn't take long to return the Hawkeyes to respectability. In his third year, Fry led the Hawkeyes to their first winning season in 21 years, a share of the Big Ten title, and a berth in the Rose Bowl–only the third bowl appearance in school history. He had vowed to resign if he didn't get the Hawkeyes to a bowl within four years.

Fry would go on to lead the Hawkeyes to three Big Ten titles (one outright, two shared) and 14 bowl games (including two more Rose Bowls in 1986 and 1991). His best team was the 1985 unit, which won a then school-record 10 games and garnered Iowa's first outright Big Ten title in 27 years. That team spent most of October ranked No. 1 in both major polls, the highest they had been ranked that far into the season in two decades. Among the legacies that Fry left behind is the now iconic Tiger Hawk logo and a widely reviled pink visitors' locker room (better to "calm" the opponents). Fry retired in 1998, turning the program over to his former assistant Kirk Ferentz.

=== Kirk Ferentz era (1999–present) ===
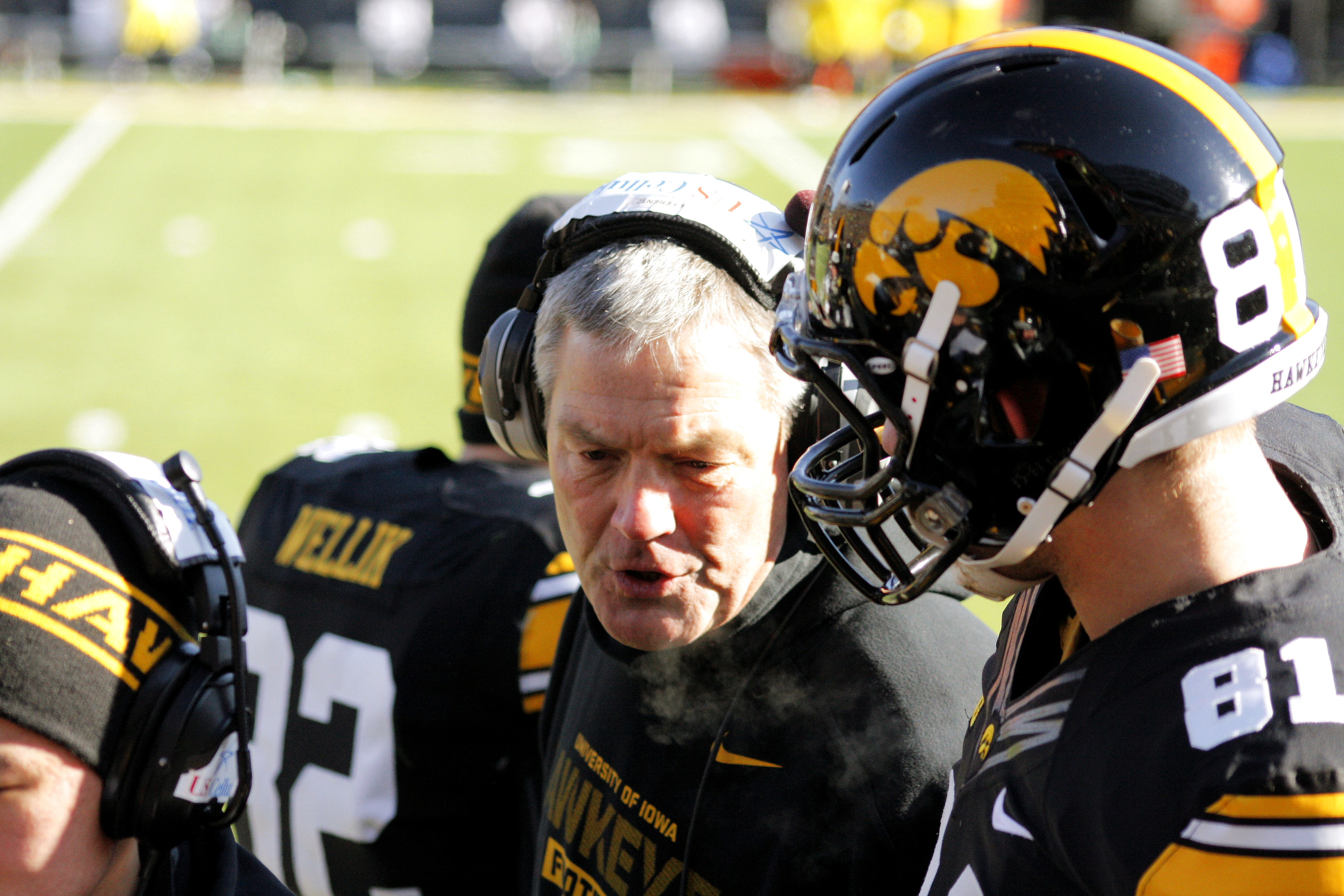
Coach Kirk Ferentz talking to players during a 2013 game

Ferentz led Iowa to three consecutive top-10 finishes from 2002 to 2004 and two Big Ten titles. The Hawkeyes have been invited to 21 bowl games in the past 23 seasons, and in 35 bowl games over the last 42 seasons. Kirk Ferentz has been the head coach since Hayden Fry's retirement after the 1998 season, and has led the team to a number of Bowl appearances, including two Orange Bowls (2003, 2010) and the 2016 Rose Bowl. Iowa has cracked the Top 25 at the end of the season twelve times during the Kirk Ferentz era – No. 8 in 2002, 2003, and 2004, No. 20 in 2008, No. 7 in 2009, No. 9 in 2015, No. 25 in 2018, No. 15 in 2019, No.16 in 2020, No. 23 in 2021. No. 24 in 2023 and No. 17 in 2025. Under Ferentz, Iowa won the Big Ten West division three times (2015, 2021 & 2023).

== Conference affiliations ==
- Independent (1889–1891)
- Western Interstate University Football Association (1892–1897)
- Independent (1898–1899)
- Big Ten Conference (1900–present)
  - Western Conference (1900–1952)
  - Big Ten Conference (1953–present)
- Missouri Valley Intercollegiate Athletic Association (1907–1910, concurrent with Western Conference membership)

== Championships ==
=== National championships ===
Iowa has been selected national champion five times by NCAA-designated major selectors, in 1921, 1922, 1956, 1958, and 1960. Iowa claims national championships for all five seasons.

Iowa finished the 1958 regular season with a 7–1–1 record and a No. 2 ranking in the major wire-service polls—the AP Poll and the Coaches' Poll—and won the 1959 Rose Bowl convincingly over No. 16 and 7–3 California, 38–12, setting or tying six Rose Bowl records. The AP and Coaches' Polls had named 10–0 Louisiana State as national champions as well as 37 other selectors The Football Writers Association of America (FWAA) awarded the Grantland Rice Trophy and their national championship to Iowa after the bowl games were played.

Season	Coach	Selectors	Record	Final AP	Final Coaches
1921	Howard Jones	Billingsley, Parke Davis	7–0	–	–
1922	Howard Jones	Billingsley	7–0	–	–
1956	Forest Evashevski	Football Research	9–1	No. 3	No. 3
1958	Forest Evashevski	Football Writers	8–1–1	No. 2	No. 2
1960	Forest Evashevski	Berryman, Boand, Litkenhous, Sagarin, Sagarin (ELO-Chess)	8–1	No. 3	No. 2

=== Conference championships ===
Iowa has won 13 conference championships in school history, eight shared and five outright, winning 11 with the Big Ten and 2 in other conferences.

Season	Coach	Conference	Conference Record	Overall Record
1896	Alfred E. Bull	Western Interstate University Football Association	3–0–1	7–1–1
1900†	Alden Knipe	Big Ten Conference	2–0–1	7–0–1
1907†	Mark Catlin Sr.	Big Eight Conference/Missouri Valley Conference‡	1–0	3–2
1921	Howard Jones	Big Ten Conference	5–0	7–0
1922†	Howard Jones	Big Ten Conference	5–0	7–0
1956	Forest Evashevski	Big Ten Conference	5–1	9–1
1958	Forest Evashevski	Big Ten Conference	5–1	8–1–1
1960†	Forest Evashevski	Big Ten Conference	5–1	8–1
1981†	Hayden Fry	Big Ten Conference	6–2	8–4
1985	Hayden Fry	Big Ten Conference	7–1	10–2
1990†	Hayden Fry	Big Ten Conference	6–2	8–4
2002†	Kirk Ferentz	Big Ten Conference	8–0	11–2
2004†	Kirk Ferentz	Big Ten Conference	7–1	10–2

† Co-champions

‡ Iowa was a member of the Missouri Valley Intercollegiate Athletic Association from 1907 to 1911 in addition to their membership in the Big Ten. In 1928, the MVIAA split in two: the Big Six (which officially retained the MVIAA name; would become the Big Eight in later years) and the Missouri Valley Conference (which retained the MVIAA administrative team). Since both leagues claim the same history from 1907 until the 1928 split, conference champions during that time are listed as conference champions of the respective leagues.

=== Division championships ===
Iowa has three Big Ten division championships.

Season	Division	Opponent	CG Result
2015	Big Ten – West	Michigan State	L 13–16
2021	Big Ten – West	Michigan	L 3–42
2023	Big Ten – West	Michigan	L 0–26

== Bowl games ==
Iowa has appeared in 38 bowl games, including 36 bowl games since 1981. In bowl games, Iowa has a 19–18–1 record. The team also accepted a bid to the 2020 Music City Bowl, which was subsequently canceled due to an outbreak of COVID-19 on the opposing team.

Season	Coach	Bowl	Opponent	Result
1956	Forest Evashevski	Rose Bowl	Oregon State	W 35–19
1958	Forest Evashevski	Rose Bowl	California	W 38–12
1981	Hayden Fry	Rose Bowl	Washington	L 0–28
1982	Hayden Fry	Peach Bowl	Tennessee	W 28–22
1983	Hayden Fry	Gator Bowl	Florida	L 6–14
1984	Hayden Fry	Freedom Bowl	Texas	W 55–17
1985	Hayden Fry	Rose Bowl	UCLA	L 28–45
1986	Hayden Fry	Holiday Bowl	San Diego State	W 39–38
1987	Hayden Fry	Holiday Bowl	Wyoming	W 20–19
1988	Hayden Fry	Peach Bowl	North Carolina State	L 23–28
1990	Hayden Fry	Rose Bowl	Washington	L 34–46
1991	Hayden Fry	Holiday Bowl	BYU	T 13–13
1993	Hayden Fry	Alamo Bowl	California	L 3–37
1995	Hayden Fry	Sun Bowl	Washington	W 38–18
1996	Hayden Fry	Alamo Bowl	Texas Tech	W 27–0
1997	Hayden Fry	Sun Bowl	Arizona State	L 7–17
2001	Kirk Ferentz	Alamo Bowl	Texas Tech	W 19–16
2002	Kirk Ferentz	Orange Bowl	USC	L 17–38
2003	Kirk Ferentz	Outback Bowl	Florida	W 37–17
2004	Kirk Ferentz	Capital One Bowl	LSU	W 30–25
2005	Kirk Ferentz	Outback Bowl	Florida	L 24–31
2006	Kirk Ferentz	Alamo Bowl	Texas	L 24–26
2008	Kirk Ferentz	Outback Bowl	South Carolina	W 31–10
2009	Kirk Ferentz	Orange Bowl	Georgia Tech	W 24–14
2010	Kirk Ferentz	Insight Bowl	Missouri	W 27–24
2011	Kirk Ferentz	Insight Bowl	Oklahoma	L 14–31
2013	Kirk Ferentz	Outback Bowl	LSU	L 14–21
2014	Kirk Ferentz	TaxSlayer Bowl	Tennessee	L 28–45
2015	Kirk Ferentz	Rose Bowl	Stanford	L 16–45
2016	Kirk Ferentz	Outback Bowl	Florida	L 3–30
2017	Kirk Ferentz	Pinstripe Bowl	Boston College	W 27–20
2018	Kirk Ferentz	Outback Bowl	Mississippi State	W 27–22
2019	Kirk Ferentz	Holiday Bowl	USC	W 49–24
2020	Kirk Ferentz	Music City Bowl	Missouri	No Contest
2021	Kirk Ferentz	Citrus Bowl	Kentucky	L 17–20
2022	Kirk Ferentz	Music City Bowl	Kentucky	W 21–0
2023	Kirk Ferentz	Citrus Bowl	Tennessee	L 0–35
2024	Kirk Ferentz	Music City Bowl	Missouri	L 24–27
2025	Kirk Ferentz	ReliaQuest	Vanderbilt	W 34–27

== Head coaches ==
Coach	Season	Games	Wins	Losses	Ties	Pct.
NO COACH (1889-1891)
Edward A. Dalton (1892)	1	6	3	2	1	.583
Ben "Sport" Donnelly (1893)	1	7	3	4	0	.429
Roger Sherman (1894)	1	9	4	4	1	.500
NO COACH (1895)
Alfred E. Bull (1896)	1	9	7	1	1	.833
Otto Wagonhurst (1897)	1	8	4	4	0	.500
Alden Knipe (1898–1902)	5	44	29	11	4	.705
John Chalmers (1903–1905)	3	32	24	8	0	.750
Mark Catlin (1906–1908)	3	17	7	10	0	.412
John Griffith (1909)	1	7	2	4	1	.357
Jesse Hawley (1910–1915)	6	42	24	18	0	.571
Howard Jones (1916–1923)	8	60	42	17	1	.708
Burt Ingwersen (1924–1931)	8	64	33	27	4	.547
Oscar "Ossie" Solem (1932–1936)	5	40	15	21	4	.425
Irl Tubbs (1937–1938)	2	16	2	13	1	.156
Eddie Anderson ^ (1939–1942, 1946-1949)	8	70	35	33	2	.514
Edward "Slip" Madigan (1943–1944)	2	16	2	13	1	.156
Clem Crowe (1945)	1	9	2	7	0	.222
Leonard Raffensperger (1950–1951)	2	18	5	10	3	.361
Forest Evashevski (1952–1960)	9	83	52	27	4	.651
Jerry Burns (1961–1965)	5	45	16	27	2	.378
Ray Nagel (1966–1970)	5	49	16	32	1	.337
Frank Lauterbur (1971–1973)	3	33	4	28	1	.136
Bob Commings (1974–1978)	5	55	18	37	0	.327
Hayden Fry (1979–1998)	20	238	143	89	6	.613
Kirk Ferentz (1999–present)	27	341	213	128	0	.625

^ Eddie Anderson did not coach during the 1943–1945 seasons to serve in World War II.

–Iowa did not hire their first head coach until 1892, even though their football program began in 1889. They have had 25 total head coaches in their program's history.

== Rivalries ==
=== Illinois ===
The series dates back to the first meeting in 1899 and has been played 80 times, tied at 39–39–2, through the 2026 season. When the Big Ten split into non-geographical "Leaders" and "Legends" divisions in 2011, The Illini and Hawkeyes were placed in opposite divisions and weren't designated as protected annual cross-divisional so the series became intermittent again. However, in 2014, the conference scrapped that divisional format in favor of a more geographically friendly "East" and West" divisional arrangement. In so doing, the Big Ten placed both Illinois and Iowa in the West division which revived the annual rivalry once again.

Perhaps the 1952 game is the most notable matchup in the history of the football rivalry. Illinois won 33–13, but the game is more known for egregious Hawkeye penalties, angry Iowa fans throwing apples at Illini football players and a punch thrown between players on both teams that lead to the Big Ten suspending the series indefinitely. The conference would not lift the indefinite suspension until 1967, the longest break in the history of the football rivalry.

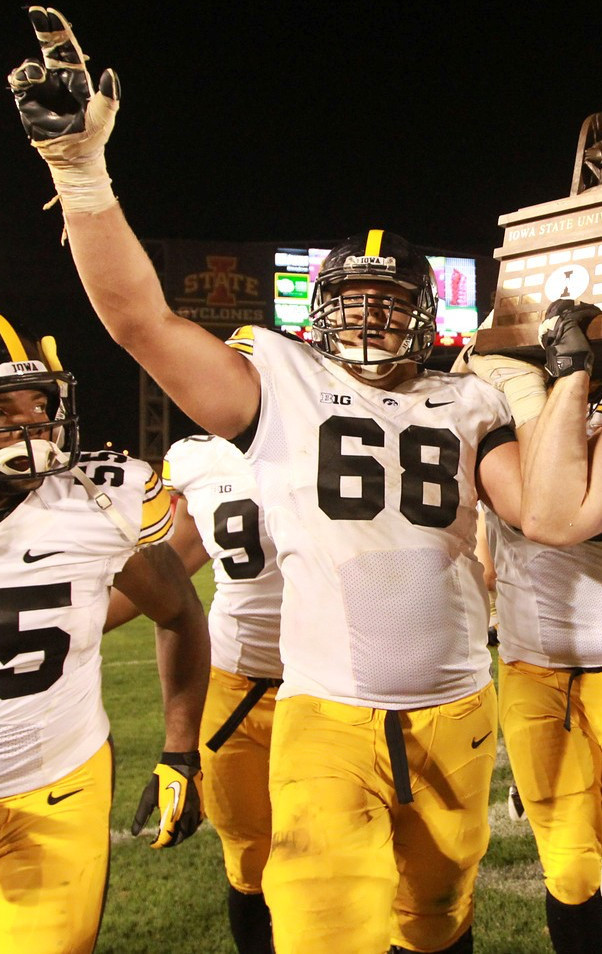
Brandon Scherff carries off the Cy-Hawk trophy after a victory in Ames against Iowa State.

=== Iowa State ===
Iowa vs Iowa State football, 2011

Iowa plays Iowa State annually for the Cy-Hawk Trophy, which began in 1977. The teams' first meeting was in 1894. The teams quit meeting after the 1934 season until they renewed their rivalry in 1977. It was in 1977 that the tradition of the Cy-Hawk Trophy began, when the Des Moines Athletic Club donated a trophy dedicated to the rivalry. It was quickly dubbed the "Cy-Hawk Trophy". Iowa leads the trophy series 32–17, and the overall series 48–25 through the 2026 season. The game is currently held in early September near Patriot Day.

=== Minnesota ===
Iowa plays Minnesota annually for the Floyd of Rosedale, which is Iowa's oldest trophy game that began in 1935. The teams' first meeting was in 1891. Floyd of Rosedale was created in 1935 after Minnesota Governor Floyd Olson bet a prize pig that the Gophers would win the game, a goal which the Gophers would accomplish that year. After the death of the pig, its image was cast in bronze, and the Floyd of Rosedale trophy was created. Iowa leads the trophy series 46–44–2 while Minnesota leads the overall series 64–54–2 through the 2026 season.

=== Nebraska ===
Iowa plays Nebraska annually for the Heroes Trophy, which began when Nebraska joined the Big Ten Conference in 2011. Since the inauguration of the series as a conference game, the game has been played on the Friday following Thanksgiving. Iowa leads the trophy series 11–4, while Nebraska leads the overall series 30–23–3 through the 2025 season.

=== Wisconsin ===
Iowa at Wisconsin in 2015

Iowa has played Wisconsin for the Heartland Trophy since 2004. The teams' first meeting was in 1894. Iowa leads the trophy series 11–10 and the overall series is tied through 100 games at 49–49–2 through the 2026 season.

== Logos and uniforms ==
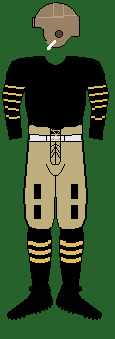
1910s football uniform

Iowa's home jersey is black with white numerals, with gold and white stripes on the sleeves. The away jersey is white with black numerals, and gold stripes on the sleeves. Players' names are located above the numerals on the back of the jersey. Gold pants with a black stripe are worn with both the home and away jersey. Iowa's helmets are black with a black facemask. They also have a gold stripe and the gold Iowa Hawkeye logo included on both sides of the helmet.

In 1979, Hayden Fry helped to create the Tiger Hawk, the logo seen on Iowa's football helmets. Since both teams shared the colors of black and yellow gold, Fry sought and gained permission from the Pittsburgh Steelers, the dominant National Football League (NFL) team of the 1970s, to overhaul Iowa's uniforms in the Steelers' image. Fry's idea was that if the team were going to act like winners, they first needed to dress like winners. Fry had originally asked Steelers defensive tackle "Mean" Joe Greene for a replica helmet and home jersey; Greene was able to send Fry to one of the team owners, and three days later, the owners sent Fry reproduction copies of the home and away uniform of Steelers quarterback Terry Bradshaw, making Iowa one of only a few schools to use the uniform scheme of an NFL team; others include the Blue Devils of Duke University whose football uniforms resemble those of the Indianapolis Colts. Although the uniforms appear substantially the same, there are subtle differences, mainly in the font of the numerals, the scheme of the white away jerseys, and the width of the pants and jersey stripes.

The Hawkeyes have removed the Tiger Hawk helmet logo and the single yellow gold stripe from their game helmets on five occasions as a symbolic gesture of mourning. The first instance was on November 2, 1991, in recognition of the six victims of a fatal campus shooting. The second occasion was for a December 29, 1996, appearance in the Alamo Bowl. It served to commemorate the family of linebacker Mark Mitchell, who were involved in a fatal vehicle accident while en route to the game. The accident resulted in the death of Mitchell's mother and severe injuries to his father and two brothers. Third came on Veterans' Day 2011 when they used a red, white, and blue Tiger Hawk on one side and left the other side blank in honor of our fallen heroes against Michigan. Fourth was September 12, 2015, when they honored Tyler Sash, former Iowa Safety and NFL Veteran, who had died on September 8, 2015. To honor Sash, one Tiger Hawk was replaced with a large, gold "#9" a tribute to the jersey number Sash wore while he played at Iowa. The Tiger Hawk was removed for a fifth time during the 2019 Holiday Bowl in San Diego, California to honor the passing of former Iowa Hawkeye football coach, Hayden Fry. The Hawkeyes have won all five memorial games.

The Iowa Athletic Director has okayed only seven stickers on the helmets from 1985 to the present. The first was in 1985, when a gold disk appeared, with the black letters "ANF", which stands for America Needs Farmers. This sticker had remained in place until 1992 when the NCAA required teams to remove 'excessive' decals. However, it was brought back by head coach Kirk Ferentz in 2009 and has remained in place since. The second was a small black sticker on the back of the helmet, with white letters that spelled out "EVY", the nickname of legendary Iowa head coach, and athletic director, Forest Evashevski, to commemorate his death in 2009. The third was in memory of Iowa high school football coaching legend Ed Thomas, who was killed in his team's weight room by a former player. A small gold sticker with the black letters "FFF" placed near the crown of the helmet represents "Faith, Family, Football," a motto Coach Thomas preached to his players to represent what his players' priorities should be not only through the season, but throughout life. The fourth was a small green sticker, with the number 30 on it to honor former Hawkeye Safety Brett Greenwood, who had recently fallen into a coma while working out at his old high school. Fifth was a small black sticker with a gold "TS", worn on the back of the helmet to commemorate the death of former Hawkeye safety Tyler Sash. Another decal was commissioned to honor former Polk County deputy sheriff Ron Stewart died on October 9, 2016, at the age of 76. Stewart volunteered his time providing security for the Iowa Football team at home and road games from 1982 to 2014. For the remainder of the season, the Hawkeyes wore a decal on the back of their helmets bearing his initials "RS" within a sheriff's badge in his memory. Most recently, a special helmet decal was worn to honor former Iowa Hawkeye football player Damon Bullock, who died at the age of 25 in March 2019. For the 2019 season opener, the Hawkeyes wore a gold circle with black lettering detailing "DB5" on the back of their helmets, a nod to Bullock's playing number from 2011 to 2014, in addition to a gold graduation cap, honoring the team's recent graduates.

== Kinnick Stadium ==
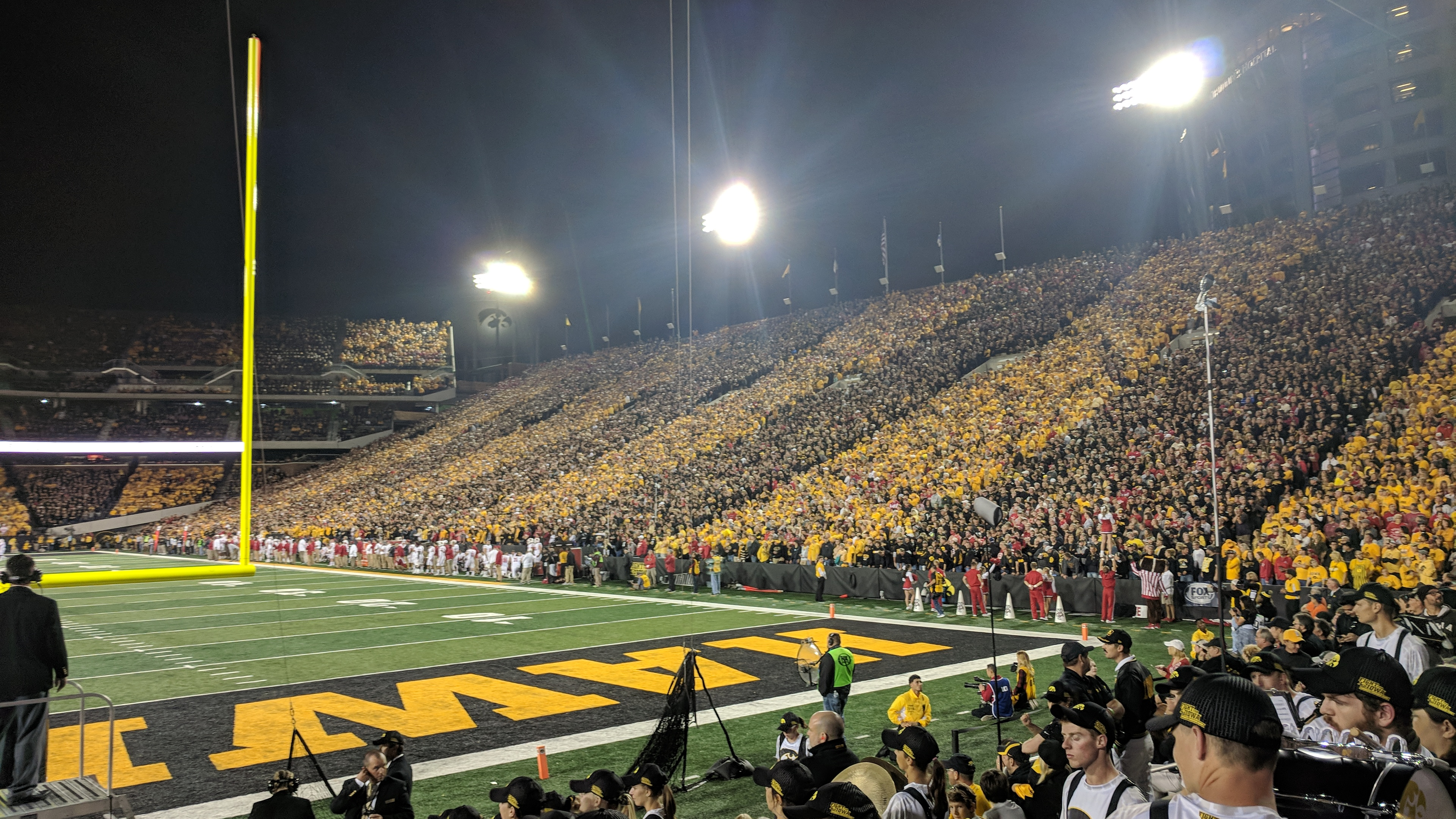
Kinnick Stadium

Nile Kinnick Stadium, formerly known as Iowa Stadium, is the home stadium of the University of Iowa Hawkeyes in Iowa City, Iowa. It opened as Iowa Stadium in 1929; prior to that time, Iowa played its home games at Iowa Field. Iowa Stadium was renamed Nile Kinnick Stadium in 1972 in honor of Nile Kinnick, the 1939 Heisman Trophy winner and the only Heisman winner in university history, who died in service during World War II. It holds 69,250 people, making it the 25th largest college football stadium in America and the 82nd largest sports stadium in the world.

== Notable games ==
=== 1953: No. 20 Iowa vs No. 1 Notre Dame ===
On Nov. 21, 1953, an undefeated No. 1 ranked Notre Dame team was set to face the Hawkeyes in South Bend. In the first quarter, Iowa defensive back Dusty Rice intercepted the Irish, which allowed the Hawkeyes to drive the ball 72 yards for an Iowa touchdown and a 7–0 lead. With only 2 seconds left in the first half, Irish tackle Frank Varrichione fell down with an injury which stopped the clock (Notre Dame had no time outs left). Varrichione went in that same play and the Irish scored on a touchdown pass to Dan Shannon, to tie the game 7–7 at the half. With the score still deadlocked late into the fourth quarter, Iowa intercepted a pass on their own 48-yard line. The Hawkeyes then scored on a touchdown pass to end Frank Gilliam to give the Hawkeyes a 14–7 lead with 2:06 left in the game, with Notre Dame having no time outs remaining. With only 6 seconds left and the clock ticking away Frank Varrichione came down with another injury which stopped the clock (again he went back in that very same play). Notre Dame then scored a touchdown to tie the game up and stay unbeaten. After the game, sportswriters such as Grantland Rice and others were infuriated calling it unfair, and the Irish earned the label: "The Fainting Irish of Notre Dame". Iowa head coach Forest Evashevski said after the game: "When the One Great Scorer comes to write against our name, He won't write whether we won or lost, but how come we got gypped at Notre Dame". The Hawkeyes, who were ranked No. 20 before the game, jumped teams with better records to gain the No. 9 ranking. Varrichione has since admitted that the injuries were fake, in Steve Delsohn's book, Talking Irish: The Oral History Of Notre Dame Football. In addition, Notre Dame Heisman winner Johnny Lattner praised his team's tactics calling it "Pretty smart thinking, wasn't it?". Because of this game, the NCAA changed the rules making players sit out at least one down before returning to the game.

=== 1956: No. 6 Ohio State at No. 7 Iowa ===
On November 17, Iowa (ranked No. 7 in the AP Poll) defeated Ohio State (ranked No. 6), 6–0, before a crowd of 57,732 at Iowa Stadium. Ohio State went into the game with the second best rushing attack in the country but were held to 147 rushing yards, their lowest rushing yardage total in two years. The result broke Ohio State's winning streak of 17 games against conference opponents and clinched for Iowa the conference championship and a berth in the Rose Bowl. After time expired, Iowa fans hauled down the goal posts and paraded through Iowa City.

=== 1957 Rose Bowl: No. 3 Iowa vs. No. 10 Oregon State ===
Aided by three rushing touchdowns, the Big Ten Champion Iowa Hawkeyes got off to a 21–6 start at the half. After the half, Iowa scored two more touchdowns and beat Oregon State 35–19. With the victory, Iowa won their first Rose Bowl Game in program history. Quarterback Ken Ploen was the game's MVP ending the game with one rushing touchdown and one passing touchdown.

=== 1959 Rose Bowl: No. 2 Iowa vs. No. 16 California ===
This game was lopsided and by the end of the third quarter, with a 22–6 advantage over the California Golden Bears, Iowa could smell victory (eventually winning by a final margin of 38–12). With their win in the Rose Bowl in 1959, the No. 2 Iowa Hawkeyes (8–1–1) won the Grantland Rice Trophy (in recognition of the national champion) as awarded by the Football Writers Association of America (FWAA) following the bowl games.

No. 1 Louisiana State (11–0) was crowned national champions in both major polls, AP and Coaches', before the bowl games were played. The LSU Tigers went on to claim a shutout victory in the Sugar Bowl over No. 12 Clemson.

=== 1981: No. 7 Nebraska at Iowa ===
Official recap—There weren't many among the 60,160 who jammed Iowa's Kinnick Stadium who thought they were watching a matchup of the eventual Midwest entries in the Rose and Orange Bowls. There probably weren't a whole lot more who thought Iowa would avenge a 57–0 slaughter the Hawkeyes had suffered in Lincoln the year before. However, Iowa took advantage of excellent field position to jump to a 10–0 first-half lead, then held on to win a 10–7 stunner over the seventh-ranked Huskers.

The Hawkeye defense held the Huskers to their lowest total offense output of the season—234 yards—and stopped the Nebraska offense three straight times in Iowa territory after Roger Craig's one-yard TD had pulled the Huskers within 10–7 early in the final period. NU was stymied in the fourth quarter by a missed 30-yard field goal, a fumble, and Lou King's diving interception, which secured Iowa's victory with 39 seconds remaining.

In the first half, the Hawkeyes capitalized on a short punt and an interception to set up a two-yard TD run by Eddie Phillips and a 35-yard field goal by Lon Olejniczak. Meanwhile, the Huskers were held scoreless through three quarters for the first time since 1973 and didn't get out of their own territory until late in the second period, partly because of Iowa punter Reggie Roby's 50-plus yard average. NU quarterbacks Mark Maurer and Nate Mason completed only 8-of-18 passes for 81 yards and rushed 12 times for minus-2 yards.

Iowa used its upset win as a launching pad to defeat such teams as UCLA, Michigan and Purdue and post its first winning season since 1961.

"At this minute, this is the greatest victory of my life," Iowa coach Hayden Fry said. "I'm getting to be an old man and I don't want to hurt any of my other teams that pulled off some upsets. But while I've been at Iowa, this is far and away the greatest victory.

"If you stay with this game long enough, the worm is bound to turn. Don't think we didn't earn this one, either. We did it fair and square, plus we showed a lot of character."

=== 1985: No. 2 Michigan at No. 1 Iowa ===
The Hawkeyes trailed 10–9 late in the fourth quarter, in what may be considered the greatest game played at Kinnick Stadium. Iowa got the ball, with 5:27 left, on their own 22-yard line. Led by their All-American Quarterback, Chuck Long, Iowa drove the ball to the Michigan 12-yard line. As the clock expired, kicker Rob Houghtlin sent one through the uprights, to give Iowa the win. The Hawkeyes would go on to accept an invitation to the 1986 Rose Bowl.

=== 2005 Capital One Bowl: No. 11 Iowa vs. No. 12 LSU ("The Catch") ===
The game has gone down in Hawkeye history known simply as "The Catch". Iowa was set to play the defending National Champion LSU Tigers. Despite leading the entire game, Iowa found itself down 24–25 and got the ball with only 46 seconds left on the clock. With only a few seconds left in the game, Iowa found itself on their own 44-yard line facing a 2nd and 6. Iowa Quarterback Drew Tate threw the ball 56 yards to Warren Holloway for an Iowa touchdown that gave the Hawkeyes a 30–25 victory over Nick Saban's defending champion Tigers. The touchdown was Holloway's first and only career touchdown.

=== 2008: No. 3 Penn State at Iowa ===
The undefeated Penn State Nittany Lions came into the game ranked No. 3 in the country with hopes of a BCS national championship. The Hawkeyes, on the other hand, were 5–4 and coming off a tough loss at Illinois. The Hawkeyes jumped out to an early lead following a Penn State sack-fumble on 3rd down during its first drive, but the Nittany Lions would come back to take a 13–7 lead into halftime. With less than four minutes left in the game, and trailing 23–21, Iowa strong safety Tyler Sash intercepted Penn State quarterback Daryll Clark's pass inside Iowa territory. The Hawkeyes drove to within field goal range where kicker Daniel Murray made a 31-yard field goal with :01 left to play. Iowa would go on to win 24–23 and hand Penn State its only regular season loss of the year. The Hawkeyes would go on to beat South Carolina in the Outback Bowl. The win would be the first in a 13-game winning streak for Iowa stretching into the 2009 season.

=== 2010 Orange Bowl: No. 9 Georgia Tech vs. No. 10 Iowa ===
The game pitted the ACC Champion Georgia Tech Yellow Jackets against No. 10 Iowa. On Iowa's second drive of the game, quarterback Ricky Stanzi drove the Hawkeyes 80 yards, culminating in a 3-yard touchdown pass to Marvin McNutt, putting Iowa on top 7–0. Iowa scored another touchdown on their next drive, following a Georgia Tech punt, with Stanzi hitting Colin Sandeman for 21 yards, extending the Hawkeyes lead to 14–0. On the ensuing drive, GT punted for the third time in a row. On Iowa's next drive, Stanzi was intercepted by Jerrard Tarrant who returned the pick for a touchdown, cutting Iowa's lead to 14–7. Georgia Tech received the ball at the start of the second half. Iowa took over on downs after Georgia Tech missed a 41-yard field goal. On Iowa's next drive, they extended their lead by three thanks to a 33-yard field goal from kicker Daniel Murray. At the start of the 4th Quarter, Iowa had a 17–7 lead. This lead was cut when Georgia Tech drove down the field for its first and only offensive touchdown of the game. The touchdown cut Iowa's lead to 17–14. However, Iowa running back Brandon Wegher sealed the win for the Hawkeyes with his 32-yard rushing touchdown late in the 4th Quarter. Iowa beat Georgia Tech by a final score of 24–14.

The win marked the first BCS Bowl win for the Iowa program (Iowa had won two Rose Bowls prior to the formation of the BCS). The win also marked Iowa's first Orange Bowl victory. Iowa is one of only five Big Ten teams to compete in and win an Orange Bowl.

=== 2016: No. 2 Michigan at Iowa ===
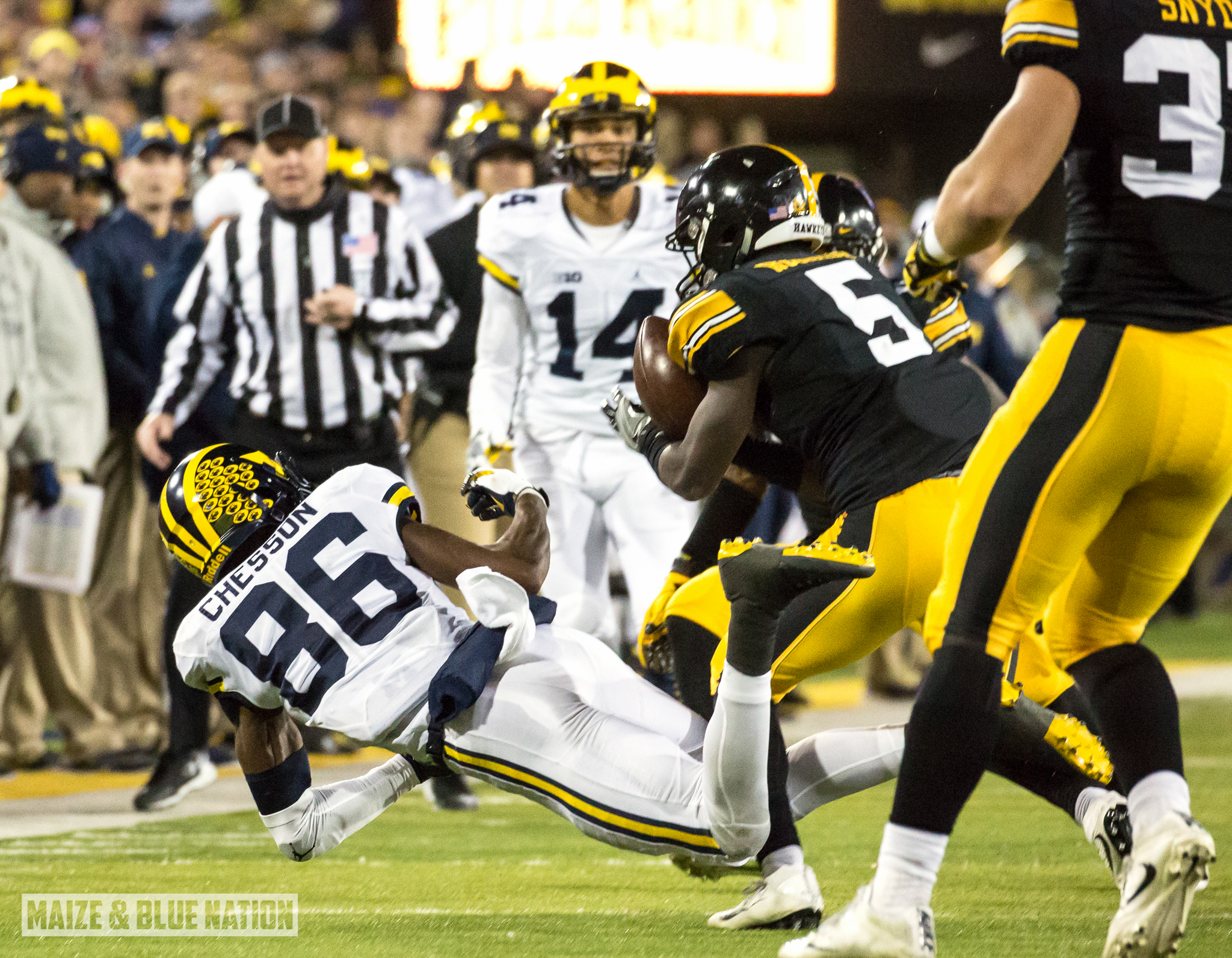
Manny Rugamba intercepts a Michigan pass at Kinnick Stadium in 2016.

Iowa entered this matchup against the 9–0 Wolverines with a 5–4 record, a letdown given the high expectations entering the season. Michigan arrived in Iowa City with the No. 1 scoring defense and the No. 3 scoring offense in the country. A week after being humbled 41–14 at Penn State, in the midst of a three-game home losing streak, and after trailing 10–0 in the second quarter of this game, the Hawkeyes put forth a gritty, spirited effort. Freshman Keith Duncan drilled a 33-yard field goal as time expired to deliver Iowa a much needed win. Akrum Wadley was the offensive standout for the Hawkeyes with 115 yards rushing, and another 52 yards receiving that included a touchdown late in the first half. The Hawkeye defense did their part as well, allowing only 201 total yards and scoring a safety in the 14–13 win.

With Clemson and Washington both losing, this marked only the second time No. 2, No. 3, and No. 4 fell during the same day in the regular season. The other time was October 19, 1985, and one of the games that day was No. 1 Iowa's 12–10 win over No. 2 Michigan.

=== 2017: No. 3 Ohio State at Iowa ===
Iowa entered this matchup against the 7–1 Buckeyes with a 5–3 record. At kickoff, the Buckeyes were ranked No. 6 in the nation and although the game was being played at Iowa's Kinnick Stadium, Ohio State was a 21-point favorite to win. Early on, it was an even contest as the teams traded scores on their way to a 17–17 midway through the second quarter. However, in the last 3 minutes of the first half, Iowa TE Noah Fant was on the receiving end of two Nate Stanley TD passes, sending Iowa into the locker room with a 31–17 lead. The second half belonged to the Hawkeyes as they sliced through the Ohio State defense on TD drives of 78, 60 and 47 yards on their way to a resounding 55–24 win. Notable performances from the game were five TD passes by Iowa QB Nathan Stanley, Iowa CB Joshua Jackson's 3 interceptions, Iowa RB Akrum Wadley rushing for 118 yards on 20 carries (5.9) and Ohio State QB J. T. Barrett throwing four INT's along with three TD's. On the day Iowa racked up a total of 487 yards against an Ohio State defense that came into the game only allowing 302 yards per contest. Many pundits remarked after the season that the lop-sided loss to Iowa was the reason that Ohio State was excluded from the College Football Playoff, even though the Buckeyes had won the Big Ten championship.

=== 2019: No. 8 Minnesota at No. 20 Iowa ===
The Hawkeyes entered this game following a close road loss (24–22) at Wisconsin. Minnesota, on the other hand, was coming in with an undefeated 9–0 record and just off a home win against then-undefeated Penn State.

However, the Gophers' undefeated season would end during this match, as they fell 23–19 to the Hawkeyes, despite a late comeback rally. Iowa kept the Gophers outside the end zone for two quarters, forcing two Gopher field goals. At the end of the half, the Hawkeyes were up 20–6. The Gophers would respond mightily in the second half, both on offense and defense, outscoring their opponent 13–3 with two touchdowns, one in the third and one in the fourth quarter. They forced a turnover late in the fourth quarter with a chance to win the game, but back to back sacks on first and second down sidelined quarterback Tanner Morgan with an injury, and Cole Kramer had to step in on a 3rd down and 21. His hail mary attempt was ultimately intercepted by Riley Moss, clinching the Hawkeyes' upset.

Minnesota would clinch the Big Ten West and play Ohio State in the Big Ten Championship if they won this match, even if they were to later fall to Wisconsin in the season finale, since the Badgers had two conference losses. However, this loss opened the door for Wisconsin to regain a shot at winning the West, which they were able to pull off by upsetting the Gophers on the road.

This was also the first of four straight wins for Iowa to end the season. Many pundits called them the "strongest 3-loss team in the country" prior to the game, as they lost in three road games by a total of 14 points to conference powers Michigan, Penn State and Wisconsin. Since 2008, Iowa is 5–1 against AP-top 10 teams at home, their lone loss coming in 2017 to Penn State on a touchdown pass as the clock expired.

=== 2021: No. 3 Iowa vs No. 4 Penn State ===
Extending from the previous season, Penn State was on a 10-game winning streak and Iowa was on a 12-game winning streak. Both teams were ranked in the Top 5 and Fox's Big Noon Kickoff came to Iowa City for the game.

Penn State jumped out to an early 17–3 lead before Iowa closed the gap to 7 by the end of the half. With PSU's starting QB, Sean Clifford, knocked out of the game, Penn State would still extend the lead to 20–10 in the 3rd Quarter. The loss of Clifford led to Penn State's offense stagnating under backup Ta'Quan Roberson for the rest of the game, as they would not score again. Iowa would again close the gap to 7 points with a field goal to close out scoring in the 3rd Quarter. Iowa scored another field goal and a touchdown in the 4th Quarter which was enough to give Iowa the 23–20 win. Controversially, Hawkeye fans stormed the field despite being the home favorite. By winning the game, Iowa extended its season record to 6–0 and obtained its third win over a ranked team in the early season. As a result of Alabama's loss to Texas A&M, Iowa would go on to be ranked #2 in the AP and Coaches Poll the following week. Because of the nature of Iowa's win against Clifford-less Penn State in the 2nd half, many college football fans opined that Iowa was overrated at #2 in the country.

== Traditions ==
=== Songs ===
Iowa's official fight song is the "Iowa Fight Song" which is sung by the marching band and the fans. Iowa's school song is "On Iowa". Iowa also plays a third fight song, entitled "Roll Along Iowa". After victories the band plays the Im Himmel gibt's kein Bier Polka, which translates to "In Heaven There is No Beer". Before the game (since 2005) the team has exited the tunnel together to "Back in Black" by AC/DC before joining hands and running onto the field in unison to "Enter Sandman" by Metallica. This became known as "The Swarm."

=== Mascot ===
Iowa's mascot is Herky the Hawk, a black and gold caricature of a hawk. Herky was created as a cartoon in 1948, and first appeared at a sporting event in 1959. Herky was actually named after the Greek god Hercules. The term "Hawkeye" originally appeared in the 19th century historical novel The Last of the Mohicans by James Fenimore Cooper; it was later used in its plural form to describe the people of the state of Iowa. The University of Iowa adopted this as the nickname for its athletic teams.

=== Hawkeye Marching Band ===
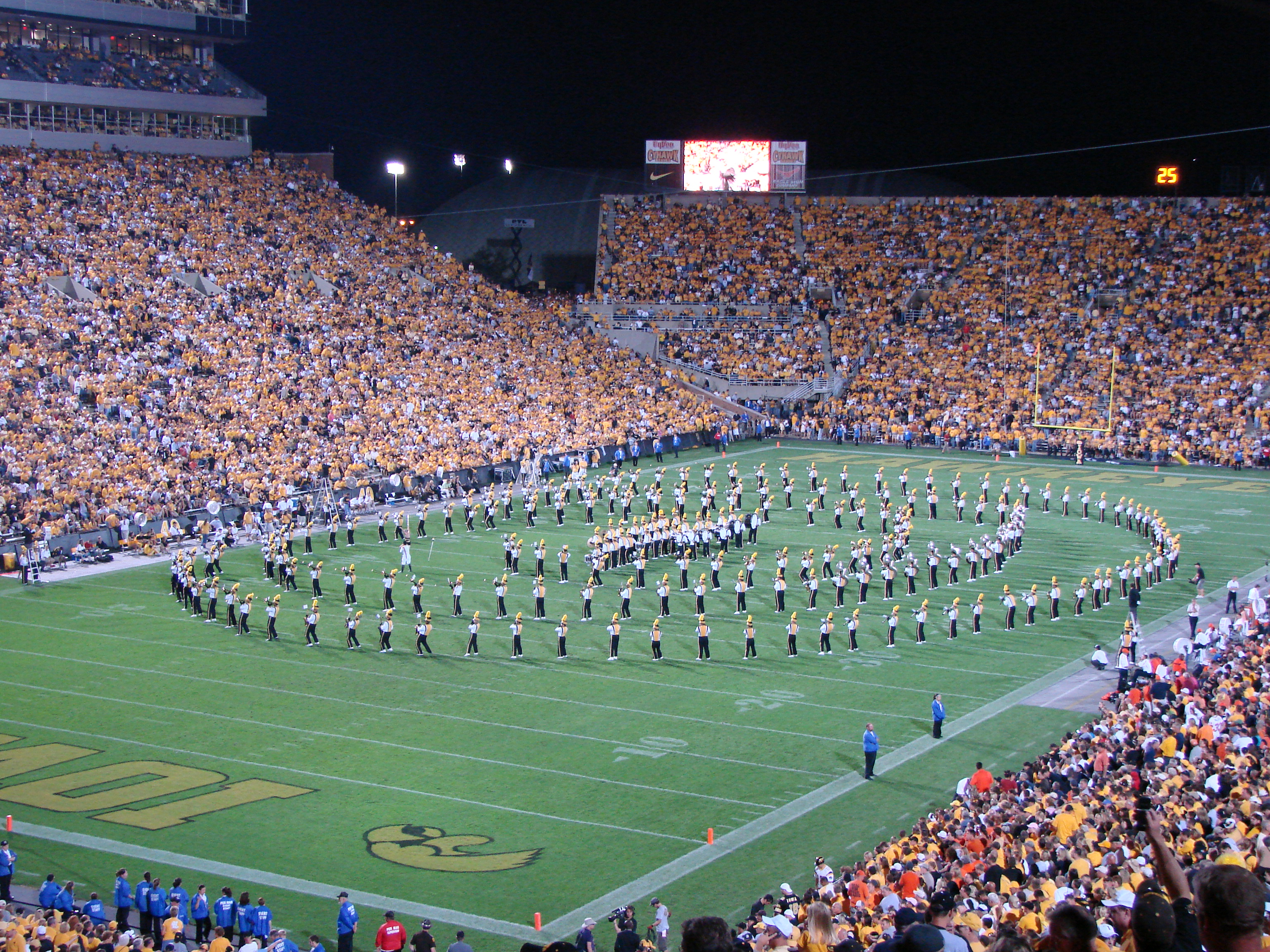
Hawkeye Marching Band

Founded in 1881, the Hawkeye Marching Band now performs at all Iowa Hawkeye home football games. The band also travels with the team to usually one away game per year and any post-season bowl games.

=== Kinnick Wave ===
In 2017, Hawkeyes fans created what ESPN called "college football's coolest new tradition". In February of that year, the university's children's hospital, which has long had a close relationship with the Iowa football program, opened a new 12-story building across the street from Kinnick Stadium, with the top few floors featuring an unobstructed view of the playing field. The top floor of the hospital features the Press Box Café, a lounge area with floor-to-ceiling windows facing the field that is reserved for patients and their families on Hawkeyes game days, with big-screen TVs available when Iowa plays on the road. Following a suggestion posted to a Hawkeyes fan page on Facebook, by Iowan Krista Young, fans now face the hospital and wave to the children and their families at the end of the first quarter of every home game. For home night games, the first of which was against Penn State on September 23, 2017, "The Wave" features fans waving with their cell phone flashlights turned on. Two weeks after the Penn State game, with the Hawkeyes at home against Illinois, the Hawkeye Marching Band joined in this new tradition, forming a hand moving side-to-side and "waving" at the children during its halftime show. The Wave was even seen in the offseason—on February 15, 2018, inspired by a suggestion from nurses at the children's hospital, the stadium's maintenance crew created a pattern of a waving hand in snow that was covering the playing field. At least one patient was reported to have seen the crew creating the design, and upon completion, the crew went into the Press Box Café to see their final product.

The tradition has even spread beyond the Iowa fan base. With Iowa playing at Michigan State on September 30, ESPN's College GameDay aired a six-minute feature on The Wave, followed by the feature's reporter, Tom Rinaldi, leading the crowd at the Virginia Tech campus in a wave of their own. A few hours later at the end of the first quarter of the Iowa–Michigan State game, Spartans fans joined in The Wave with visiting Iowa fans.

Disney Sports announced it would present the Iowa football program with its Disney's Wide World of Sports Spirit Award, which annually goes to college football's most inspirational figure on November 20, 2017. The award was presented to the University of Iowa for The Wave on ESPN on December 7, 2017.

== Honors and awards ==
=== Final Rankings ===
Since the 2025 season, Iowa has been ranked in the final Associated Press poll 28 times and the Coaches 27 times. The Hawkeyes have finished the season ranked in the Top 10 in the Associated Press poll 13 times. The 1940s and 1970s are the only decades that the Iowa Hawkeyes have not had a team finish in the Associated Press poll Top 10 since the poll's inception in 1936.

Year	AP Ranking	Coaches Poll Ranking	Record
1939	No. 9	NR	6–1-1
1953	No. 9	No. 10	5–3–1
1955	NR	No. 19	3–5–1
1956	No. 3	No. 3	9–1–0
1957	No. 6	No. 5	7–1–1
1958	No. 2	No. 2	8–1–1
1960	No. 3	No. 2	8–1–0
1981	No. 18	No. 15	8–4–0
1983	No. 14	No. 14	9–3–0
1984	No. 16	No. 15	8–4–1
1985	No. 10	No. 9	10–2–0
1986	No. 16	No. 15	9–3–0
1987	No. 16	No. 16	10-3-0
1990	No. 18	No. 16	8–4–0
1991	No. 10	No. 10	10–1–1
1995	No. 25	No. 22	8–4–0
1996	No. 18	No. 18	9–3
2002	No. 8	No. 8	11–2
2003	No. 8	No. 8	10–3
2004	No. 8	No. 8	10–2
2008	No. 20	No. 20	9–4
2009	No. 7	No. 7	11–2
2015	No. 9	No. 10	12–2
2018	No. 25	NR	9–4
2019	No. 15	No. 15	10–3
2020	No. 16	No. 15	6–2
2021	No. 23	No. 23	10–4
2023	No. 24	No. 22	10–4
2025	No. 17	No. 17	9–4

The Hawkeyes have also finished ranked in the final College Football Playoff Rankings (CFP) six times since its inception in 2014.

Year	CFP Ranking	Record
2015	No. 5	12–2
2019	No. 16	10–3
2020	No. 15	6–2
2021	No. 15	10–4
2023	No. 17	10–4
2025	No. 23	9–4

=== First team All-Americans ===
An Iowa player has been selected as a Consensus All-Americans 37 times, with 35 players having been honored as such (two players Cal Jones and Larry Station received the honor twice). A total of 17 Hawkeyes have been named as unanimous All-American.

Consensus All-Americans

Name	Position	Year.
Lester Belding	End	1919
Aubrey Devine	QB	1921
Gordon Locke	FB	1922
Nile Kinnick	HB	1939
Cal Jones	G	1954, 1955
Alex Karras	DT	1957
Randy Duncan	QB	1958
Reggie Roby	P	1981
Andre Tippett	LB	1981
Larry Station	LB	1984, 1985
Chuck Long	QB	1985
Marv Cook	TE	1988
Leroy Smith	DE	1991
Tim Dwight	KR	1997
Jared DeVries	DE	1998
Dallas Clark	TE	2002
Eric Steinbach	G	2002
Robert Gallery	T	2003
Nate Kaeding	PK	2003
Shonn Greene	HB	2008
Adrian Clayborn	DE	2010
Brandon Scherff	T	2014
Desmond King	DB	2015
Josey Jewell	LB	2017
Josh Jackson	DB	2017
Keith Duncan	PK	2019
Daviyon Nixon	DT	2020
Tyler Linderbaum	C	2021
Jack Campbell	LB	2022
Cooper DeJean	DB	2023
Tory Taylor	P	2023
Jay Higgins	LB	2024
Kaleb Johnson	HB	2024
Logan Jones	C	2025
Kaden Wetjen	KR	2025

Unanimous All-Americans

Name	Position	Year
Randy Duncan	QB	1958
Chuck Long	QB	1985
Larry Station	LB	1985
Dallas Clark	TE	2002
Robert Gallery	T	2003
Shonn Greene	HB	2008
Brandon Scherff	T	2014
Desmond King	DB	2015
Josey Jewell	LB	2017
Josh Jackson	DB	2017
Daviyon Nixon	DT	2020
Tyler Linderbaum	C	2021
Jack Campbell	LB	2022
Cooper DeJean	DB	2023
Tory Taylor	P	2023
Jay Higgins	LB	2024
Logan Jones	C	2025

=== Kinnick Stadium Wall of Honor ===
In 2013, Iowa introduced the Kinnick Stadium Wall of Honor. Players inducted into the Kinnick Wall of Honor have their name and number placed on the Kinnick Stadium Press Box.

Wall of Honor Members
Name	Position	Number
Duke Slater	T	15
Aubrey Devine	QB	1
Gordon Locke	FB	1
Nile Kinnick	HB	24
Cal Jones	G	62
Alex Karras	DT	77
Randy Duncan	QB	25
Chuck Long	QB	16
Larry Station	LB	36
Andre Tippett	LB	99
Robert Gallery	G	78

=== Individual award winners ===
National College Football Awards Association

The Hawkeyes have won 18 NCFAA individual player awards. Iowa also won the 2017 Disney's Wide World of Sports Spirit Award, Iowa Head Coach Kirk Ferentz won the Eddie Robinson Coach of the Year Award in 2015 and Iowa Defensive Coordinator Phil Parker won the Broyles Award in 2023 bringing Iowa's total NCFAA awards to 21.

•Heisman Trophy

Nile Kinnick – 1939

•Maxwell Award

Nile Kinnick – 1939
Chuck Long – 1985

•Davey O'Brien Award

Chuck Long – 1985
Brad Banks – 2002

•Ray Guy Award

Tory Taylor – 2023

•John Mackey Award

Dallas Clark – 2002
T. J. Hockenson – 2018

•Lou Groza Award

Nate Kaeding – 2002

•Butkus Award

Jack Campbell – 2022

•Doak Walker Award

Shonn Greene – 2008

•Jim Thorpe Award

Desmond King – 2015

•Outland Trophy

Cal Jones – 1955
Alex Karras – 1957
Robert Gallery – 2003
Brandon Scherff – 2014

•Dave Rimington Trophy

Tyler Linderbaum – 2021
Logan Jones – 2025

Other Awards

•AP Athlete of the Year

Nile Kinnick – 1939

•AP Player of the Year

Brad Banks – 2002

•UPI Lineman of the Year

Alex Karras – 1957

•Ozzie Newsome Award

T. J. Hockenson – 2018

•Jack Tatum Trophy

Desmond King – 2015
Josh Jackson – 2017

•William V. Campbell Trophy

Jack Campbell – 2022

•Jack Lambert Trophy

Josey Jewell – 2017

•Lott IMPACT Trophy

Josey Jewell – 2017

•Jim Brown Award

Shonn Greene – 2008

•Jet Award

Kaden Wetjen – 2024
Kaden Wetjen – 2025

=== Coaching award winners ===
•AFCA Coach of the Year

Eddie Anderson – 1939

•AFCA Assistant Coach of the Year

Ron Aiken – 2002

•AFCA Assistant Coach of the Year

Norm Parker – 2011

•AFCA Assistant Coach of the Year

Phil Parker – 2023

•Broyles Award

Phil Parker – 2023

•AP Coach of the Year Award

Kirk Ferentz – 2002

•Walter Camp Coach of the Year Award

Kirk Ferentz – 2002

•Bobby Dodd Coach of the Year Award

Kirk Ferentz – 2015

•Eddie Robinson Coach of the Year Award

Kirk Ferentz – 2015

•Woody Hayes Trophy

Kirk Ferentz – 2015

•Sporting News College Football Coach of the Year

Hayden Fry – 1981

•Amos Alonzo Stagg Award

Hayden Fry – 2005

•The National Football Foundation Gridiron Club Legends Award

Hayden Fry – 2018

=== Team awards ===
•Joe Moore Award

Iowa – 2016
Iowa – 2025

•Disney's Wide World of Sports Spirit Award

Iowa – 2017

•Laureus World Sports Award for Best Sporting Moment

Iowa – 2018

== Retired numbers ==
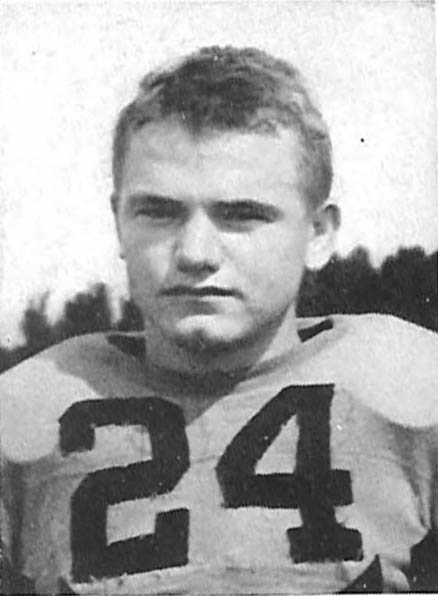
HB Nile Kinnick, 1939 Heisman Trophy winner and one of the two numbers retired by Iowa

Iowa Hawkeyes retired numbers
No.	Player	Pos.	Tenure	Ref.
24	Nile Kinnick	HB	1936–1939	
62	Cal Jones	G	1952–1955	

Two numbers have been retired by the Hawkeye football program, Nile Kinnick's No. 24 and Cal Jones' No. 62. Both Kinnick and Jones were consensus first team All-Americans, and both men died in separate plane crashes before their 25th birthday.

Kinnick won the University of Iowa's only Heisman Trophy in 1939 and is the man for whom Kinnick Stadium is named.

Jones was the first African-American to win the Outland Trophy and is one of only two Hawkeyes to be named Consensus All-American two times. Jones also finished 10th in the Heisman Trophy voting, an impressive finish for a lineman.

== Hall of Fame ==
=== Pro Football Hall of Fame ===
Five Hawkeyes have been inducted into the Pro Football Hall of Fame.

Player	Position	Inducted	Teams	Ref.
Emlen Tunnell	DB	1967	New York Giants, Green Bay Packers	
Paul Krause	S	1998	Minnesota Vikings, Washington Redskins	
Andre Tippett	LB	2008	New England Patriots	
Alex Karras	DT	2020	Detroit Lions	
Duke Slater	T	2020	Milwaukee Badgers, Rock Island Independents, Chicago Cardinals	

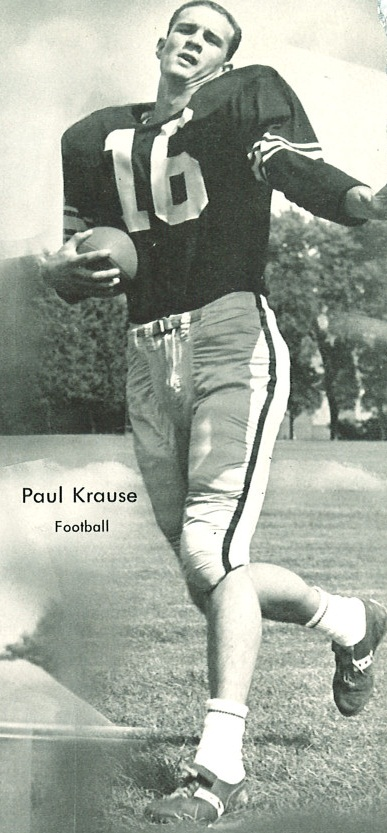
Paul Krause, Hall of Fame safety

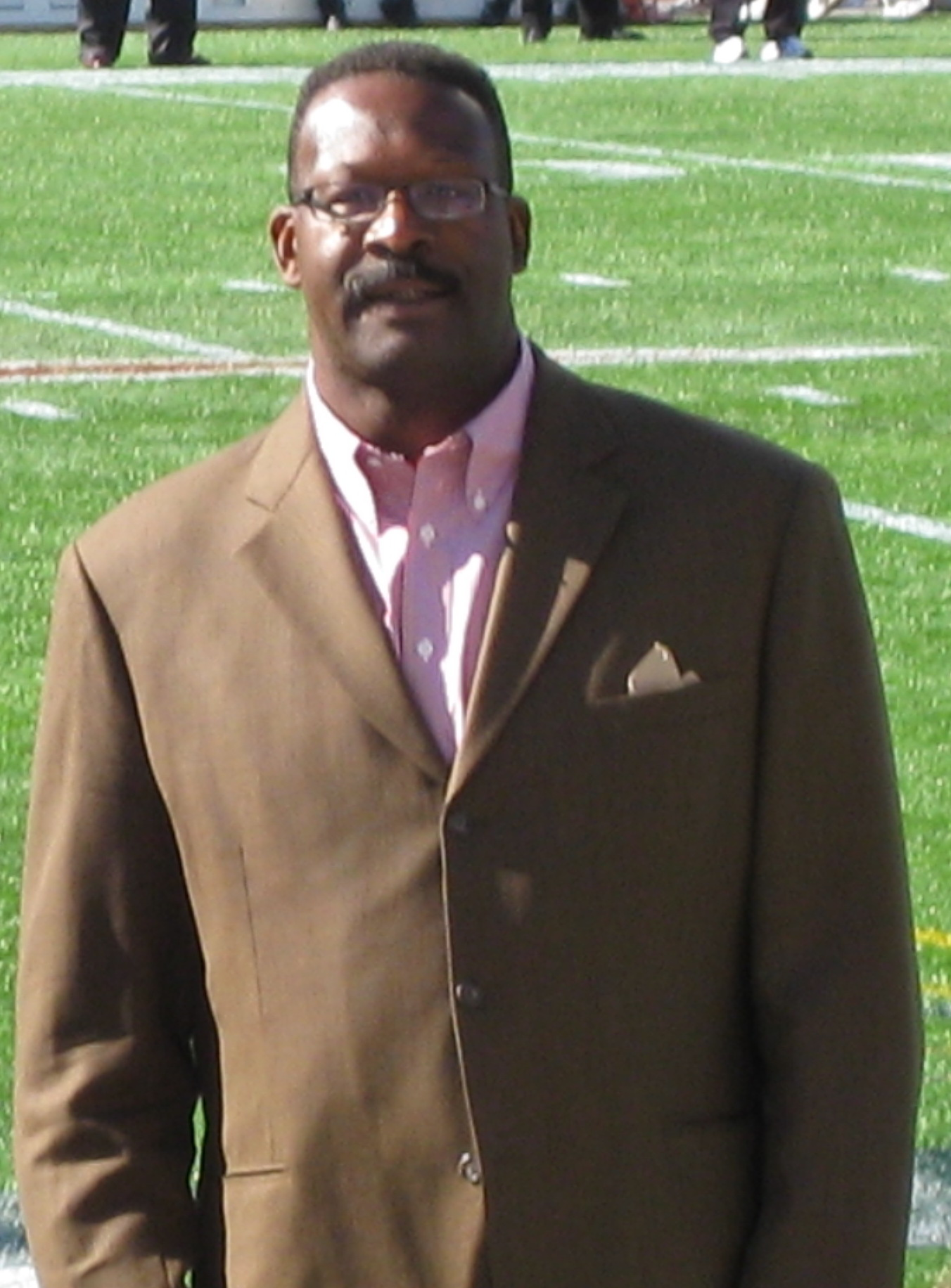
Andre Tippett, Hall of Fame linebacker

=== College Football Hall of Fame ===
Iowa has 16 inductees in the College Football Hall of Fame.

Name	Position	Tenure	Inducted	Ref.
Howard Jones	Coach	1916–1923	1951	
Duke Slater	T	1918–1921	1951	
Nile Kinnick	QB	1936–1939	1951	
Gordon Locke	FB	1920–1922	1960	
Eddie Anderson	Coach	1939–1949	1971	
Aubrey Devine	QB	1919–1921	1973	
Slip Madigan	Coach	1943–1944	1974	
Cal Jones	G	1952–1955	1980	
Alex Karras	DT	1954–1957	1981	
Randy Duncan	QB	1956–1958	1997	
Chuck Long	QB	1981–1985	1999	
Forest Evashevski	Coach	1952–1960	2000	
Hayden Fry	Coach	1979–1998	2003	
Larry Station	LB	1982–1985	2009	
Andre Tippett	DE	1979–1982	2021	
Robert Gallery	G	1999–2003	2023	

=== Rose Bowl Hall of Fame ===
The Rose Bowl has inducted four Iowa coaches and players into the Rose Bowl Game Hall of Fame.

Name	Position	Tenure	Inducted	Ref.
Bump Elliott	Assistant coach Athletic director	1952–1956; 1970–1991	1989	
Bob Jeter	HB	1956–1959	1994	
Ken Ploen	QB	1953–1956	1997	
Hayden Fry	Head coach	1979–1998	2010	

== Iowa and the NFL ==
=== First round NFL draft picks ===
Iowa has had at least one player drafted in every NFL draft since 1978. Through the 2020 NFL draft, Iowa has had 294 draft picks. 254 in the NFL, 21 in the AFL, and 7 in the AAFC (the AFC and AAFC both merged with the NFL). and 83 players have gone in the first three rounds of the NFL draft. Iowa has had 26 first-round NFL draft selections:

Season	Player	Team	Selection
1936	Dick Crayne	Brooklyn Dodgers	4th
1958	Alex Karras	Detroit Lions	10th
1959	Randy Duncan	Green Bay Packers	1st
1966	John Niland	Dallas Cowboys	5th
1973	Craig Clemons	Chicago Bears	12th
1976	Rod Walters	Kansas City Chiefs	14th
1982	Ron Hallstrom	Green Bay Packers	22nd
1984	John Alt	Kansas City Chiefs	21st
1986	Chuck Long	Detroit Lions	12th
1986	Ronnie Harmon	Buffalo Bills	16th
1986	Mike Haight	New York Jets	22nd
1997	Tom Knight	Arizona Cardinals	9th
1997	Ross Verba	Green Bay Packers	30th
2003	Dallas Clark	Indianapolis Colts	24th
2004	Robert Gallery	Oakland Raiders	2nd
2006	Chad Greenway	Minnesota Vikings	17th
2010	Bryan Bulaga	Green Bay Packers	23rd
2011	Adrian Clayborn	Tampa Bay Buccaneers	20th
2012	Riley Reiff	Detroit Lions	23rd
2015	Brandon Scherff	Washington Redskins	5th
2019	T. J. Hockenson	Detroit Lions	8th
2019	Noah Fant	Denver Broncos	20th
2020	Tristan Wirfs	Tampa Bay Buccaneers	13th
2022	Tyler Linderbaum	Baltimore Ravens	25th
2023	Lukas Van Ness	Green Bay Packers	13th
2023	Jack Campbell	Detroit Lions	18th

== Future non-conference opponents ==
Announced schedules as of September 17, 2026

Iowa was originally scheduled to play Florida Atlantic in 2025, but has instead moved the game to 2030.

2027	2028	2029	2030	2031
Aug 28 North Dakota	Sep 2 UT Martin	Sep 1 Northern Iowa	Aug 31 Florida Atlantic	Sep 6 at Iowa State
Sep 4 Ball State	Sep 9 Iowa State	Sep 8 at Iowa State	Sep 7 Iowa State	TBD
Sep 11 at Iowa State	Sep 16 Western Michigan	Sep 15 Northern Illinois	TBD	TBD
