= Hawkeye Marching Band =

Marching band at the University of Iowa

- School: University of Iowa
- Location: Iowa City, Iowa
- Conference: Big Ten
- Founded: 1881
- Director: Eric W. Bush
- Members: 300
- Fight song: "On Iowa", "Iowa Fight Song", and "Roll Along Iowa""

Uniform
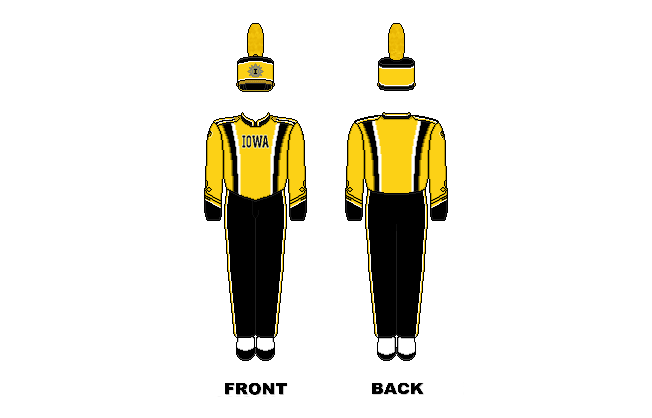
- Website: Hawkeye Marching Band

The Hawkeye Marching Band (or HMB) is the marching band for the University of Iowa. The band performs at all home Hawkeye football games at Kinnick Stadium in addition to other events. It is the largest and most visible musical ensemble at the university. The band was founded in 1881 as a military band, giving membership to both music students and members of the military. In 1990, the band was awarded the Louis Sudler Intercollegiate Marching Band Trophy, generally considered to be the most prestigious honor a collegiate marching band can receive.

== History ==
The Hawkeye Marching Band was founded in 1881 in order to provide music for the State University of Iowa Battalion. During this time, members of the band would undergo the same training as their military counterparts. However, over the years, the military and band would gradually grow into separate entities. Because of this growing rift between the two organizations, the marching band became more of a form of entertainment than a military group by the year 1929, the same year that Kinnick Stadium was completed. The band became a part of the Fine Arts department in 1936.

Around this time, when the distinction between the military and the marching band grew larger, the band began to perform for more public events, rather than the military gatherings of the past. The Iowa marching band, like other Big Ten bands, began to make appearances at concerts, university ceremonies, and football games. During the mid-twentieth century, the band adopted a very militaristic style of marching. Marchers were expected to march with crack precision and the band's director during that time, Frederick C. Ebbs, eliminated any flags or twirlers that the band had used up to that point.

In 1973, Morgan Jones became director of the Hawkeye Marching Band and once again changed the style and look of the band. Jones added a line of flag color guard and six other twirlers to accompany the featured twirler. Jones also changed the style of music played. The band began to perform different styles of music, easygoing slow music and loud fast-paced music, as well as displaying both abstract formations and recognizable patterns on the field. The Hawkeye Marching Band was widely regarded as one of the few bands that effectively executed all of these things. After the 1990 season, the band was awarded the prestigious John Philip Sousa Foundation Sudler Trophy. The 1990 season and the Sudler Trophy would mark the end of the Morgan Jones era for the HMB. Jones' 18-year period as director was one of the most successful in the history of the Hawkeye Marching Band.

The band went through three different directors during the next few years and included a brief return by Morgan Jones during the mid-1990s. In the summer of 1998, the band found its next permanent director in Leroy Kevin Kastens, former director of the Marching Mizzou from the University of Missouri, as well as the Marching Hundred, from Indiana University. Kastens' tenure at Iowa lasted 20 years, as he retired in the spring of 2018.

After a national search, Dr. Eric W. Bush was chosen as the next associate director of Bands and the Director of the Hawkeye Marching Band. Bush previously served as assistant director of Bands and assistant director of the Blue Band at Pennsylvania State University. Before that, he served as a graduate teaching assistant while earning the D.M.A. in band conducting degree from the University of Iowa.

== Marching style ==
The HMB employs two styles of marching: a traditional high chair step marching style, always used during pregame performances, parades, while exiting the field after halftime performances, and the lengthy drum cadence called "The Series"; and a modern glide step, utilized during halftime performances.

Like other Big Ten bands, the HMB uses a unique style when marching in high step. Based in the chair step style, the foot is pointed, and the upper leg is lifted parallel to the ground, forming a 120-degree angle with the lower leg. In addition, band members must simultaneously sway their shoulders and instrument from side to side at 45 degree angles while marching, an act referred to as the "Swagger".

During the band's halftime performances, a more contemporary low-step style (glide step) is used, where the toe is pointed upwards and the heel is rolled along the ground. There are several reasons for the use of low-step instead of high-step, primarily that the "Swagger" used in the HMB's high step significantly increases the risk of collision between members, which necessitates highly choreographed drills in the flavor of traditional military-style marching. Additionally, the use of the glide step allows the band to create more elaborate formations on the field, and enables the brass sections to direct their sound towards one sideline, improving sound quality. The band will occasionally use both high step and glide step during halftime performances, although this is rare.

== Uniform ==
The HMB's current uniform, revised for the 2015 season, consists of a primarily gold coat with black and white accents and the word IOWA embroidered in black on the center of the chest; black and gold shako with gold plume; black overalls with a single gold stripe along the outside seam; black gloves; white spats; and black marching shoes. On the center of the shako is a gold starburst badge with a black letter I in the middle.

The drum major's uniform is identical in pattern to the standard uniform, but with a primarily black or white color palette, and more elaborate hat called a busbee. The color used for each game is at the discretion of the drum major and band director, although in general, the white uniform is used for home games, and the black uniform is used for away games.

Band members are permitted to wear small temporary tattoos or eye black on their faces, provided it is not excessive. Male members are permitted a beard so long as it is well-kept; otherwise, they must be clean-shaven.

== Personnel ==
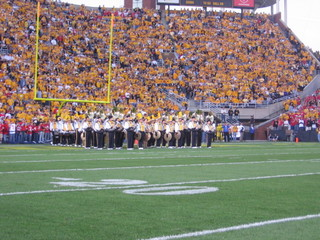
The drumline and sousaphone sections prepare for the pregame show.

=== Instrumentation ===
There are ten sections in the Hawkeye Marching Band: piccolos, clarinets, alto saxophones, tenor saxophones, trumpets, mellophones, trombones, baritone horns, sousaphones, and a drumline consisting of snare drums, tenor drums, bass drums, and cymbals.

Instrumental sections are led by a section leader, who is charged with teaching the required musical selections for a particular show; and "undergrad staff" members, who are in charge of teaching marching fundamentals to the section during the band's training week.

The HMB uses a squad system when writing drills for both pregame and halftime. Squads are composed of four members of a particular section and are designated an alphabetical symbol in marching drills. Sometimes, squads can be composed of members of different sections. For example, one particular squad may be made up of two members of the trumpet section and two members of the trombone section.

Occasionally, members of a section are placed on "reserve" for a certain week. This is because the number of spots in a particular drill may not have enough spots for every member of a section. HMB members who are placed on reserve fill vacant spots during rehearsals and may be called upon to fill spots during performances if the designated member is not able to attend. Members placed on reserve may also be called upon to aid the graduate staff members with equipment or other items during performances.

=== Drum Major ===
The drum major position is the highest rank that an undergraduate student can attain in the Hawkeye Marching Band. The drum major performs routines during both pregame and halftime shows and incorporates a mace during these routines. Students achieving the rank of drum major are also required to instruct the band during much of the training period at the beginning of a marching season. The current drum major is Christian Frankl. Christian was preceded by Amanda Thomas, the second female drum major of the Hawkeye Marching Band. Former drum major Analisa Iole became the first female drum major of the modern era in 2017. A former Hawkeye drum major and University of Iowa alumnus, David Woodley, was director of the Marching Hundred of Indiana University from 1993 to 2019.

=== Golden Girl ===
Like many other collegiate marching bands, a featured baton twirler is used. In the HMB, this twirler is known as the "Golden Girl". The University of Iowa Golden Girl is one of only two full-tuition scholarships available to the feature twirlers in the nation. Like the drum major, the Golden Girl performs choreographed routines during both pregame and halftime. Many of these routines are choreographed for both the drum major and Golden Girl performing with each other. The current Golden Girl is Ella McDaniel. Ella is also the current "Miss Majorette of America", a tile given to the winner of the prestigious "Miss Majorette of America" baton twirling pageant.

Former Golden Girls Linda Simon, Jayna Sanchez and Diana Reed represented Iowa, and Laurie Broderick represented Indiana, in the Miss America pageant; Jane Stemmerman represented Iowa in Distinguished Young Women. All utilized their baton skills in the talent competition. Former Golden Girl Nikki Meredith (now Crawford) was World Champion twirler in 1984 and won the 2011 Ms Fitness USA. Ella McDaniel's predecessor Kylene Spanbauer was recently named Miss Wisconsin 2022.

=== Section leaders and undergraduate staff (SLUGS) ===
Section leaders are undergraduate members of the HMB are responsible for the musical performance of their respective sections. Section leaders conduct musical warm-ups at all rehearsals, before performances, and instruct their sections on new musical selections.

Undergraduate staff members instruct HMB members in their section, both first-year and veteran members, on marching fundamentals and techniques. Both section leaders and undergraduate staffers may be called upon to serve as squad leaders after the conclusion of camp.

== Performances ==
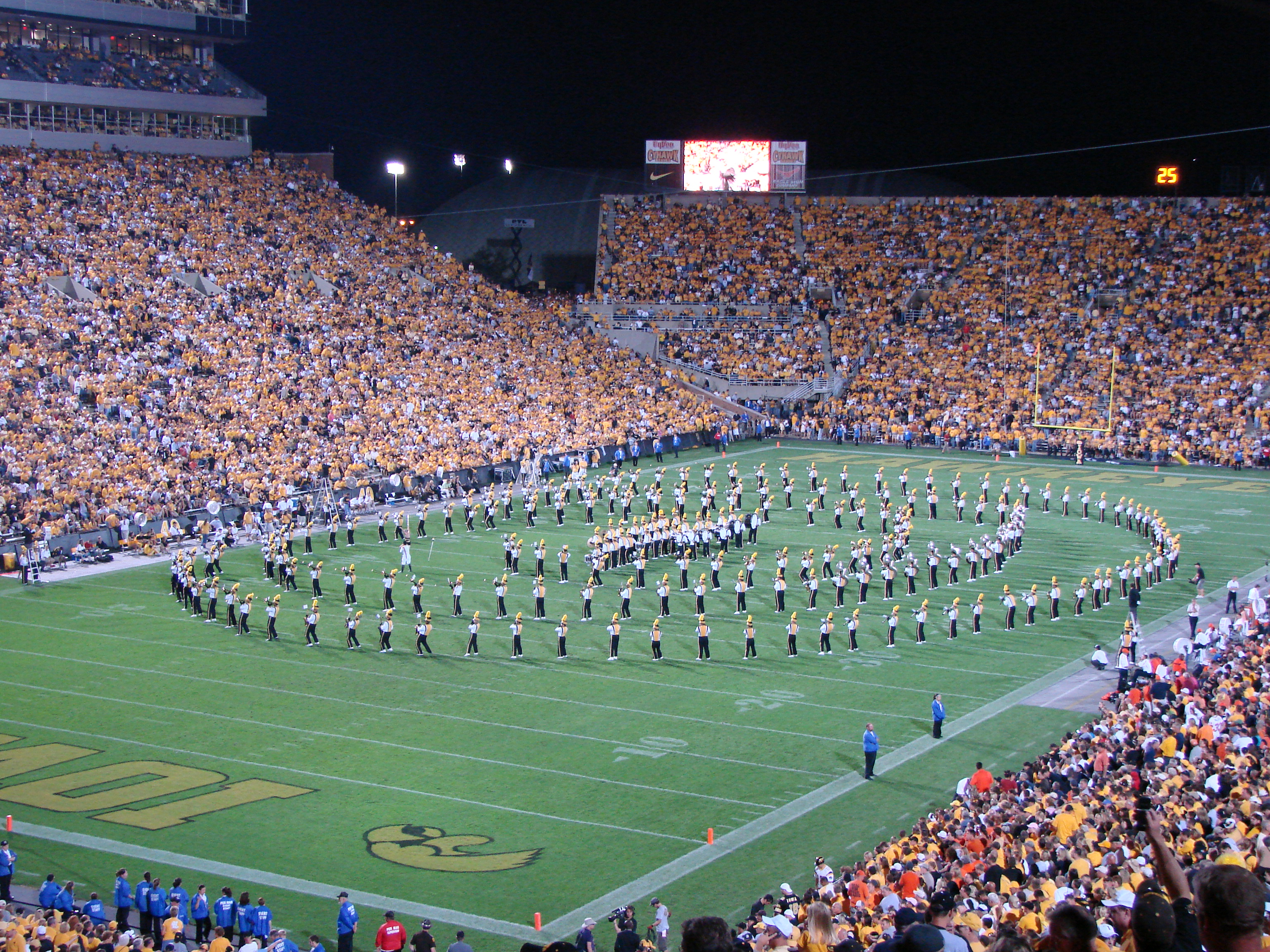
The HMB performs at halftime.

The Hawkeye Marching Band performs at all home football games at Kinnick Stadium. The band will also travel with the football team to at least one away game per year, and the post-season bowl game, if being played. The band traveled to Ames, Iowa every other year when the Hawkeyes played the Iowa State Cyclones in the annual battle for the Cy-Hawk Trophy, but have not traveled since the 2019 game where band members were assaulted while exiting the stadium.

At the end of each marching season, the band holds an indoor concert at the Xtream Arena in Coralville, Iowa called the "Band Extravaganza". From 2008 to 2019, this concert was held in Carver-Hawkeye Arena. Prior to 2008, it was held in Hancher Auditorium, but was moved due to damage caused by the Iowa Flood of 2008. During this concert, the HMB performs the traditional school songs, On Iowa, The Iowa Fight Song, and "Roll Along Iowa"; and different halftime selections from throughout the year, accompanied by other university musical groups, the cheer squad, and drill team.

Every three years, the band travels to Cedar Rapids, Iowa for the Cedar Rapids Metro Marching Band Classic, where seven Cedar Rapids area high school marching bands, along with the HMB, hold an exhibition of their halftime shows. The Hawkeye Marching Band rotates every third year with the Iowa State University Cyclone Football 'Varsity' Marching Band and the University of Northern Iowa Panther Marching Band.

== Directors ==
Following are those who have held the position of the director of the Hawkeye Marching Band:

- 1906-1909 - Henry G. Cox
- 1909-1911 - Howard J. Barnum
- 1911-1936 - O.E. Van Doren
- 1937-1953 - Charles B. Righter
- 1954-1966 - Frederick C. Ebbs
- 1967 - Frank Piersol^{note}
- 1968-1972 - Tom Davis
- 1973-1990 - Morgan Jones
- 1991-1992 - David Woodley
- 1993-1995 - Dave Henning
- 1996-1997 - Morgan Jones
- 1998–2017 - Kevin Kastens
- 2018–present - Eric W. Bush

== Traditions ==
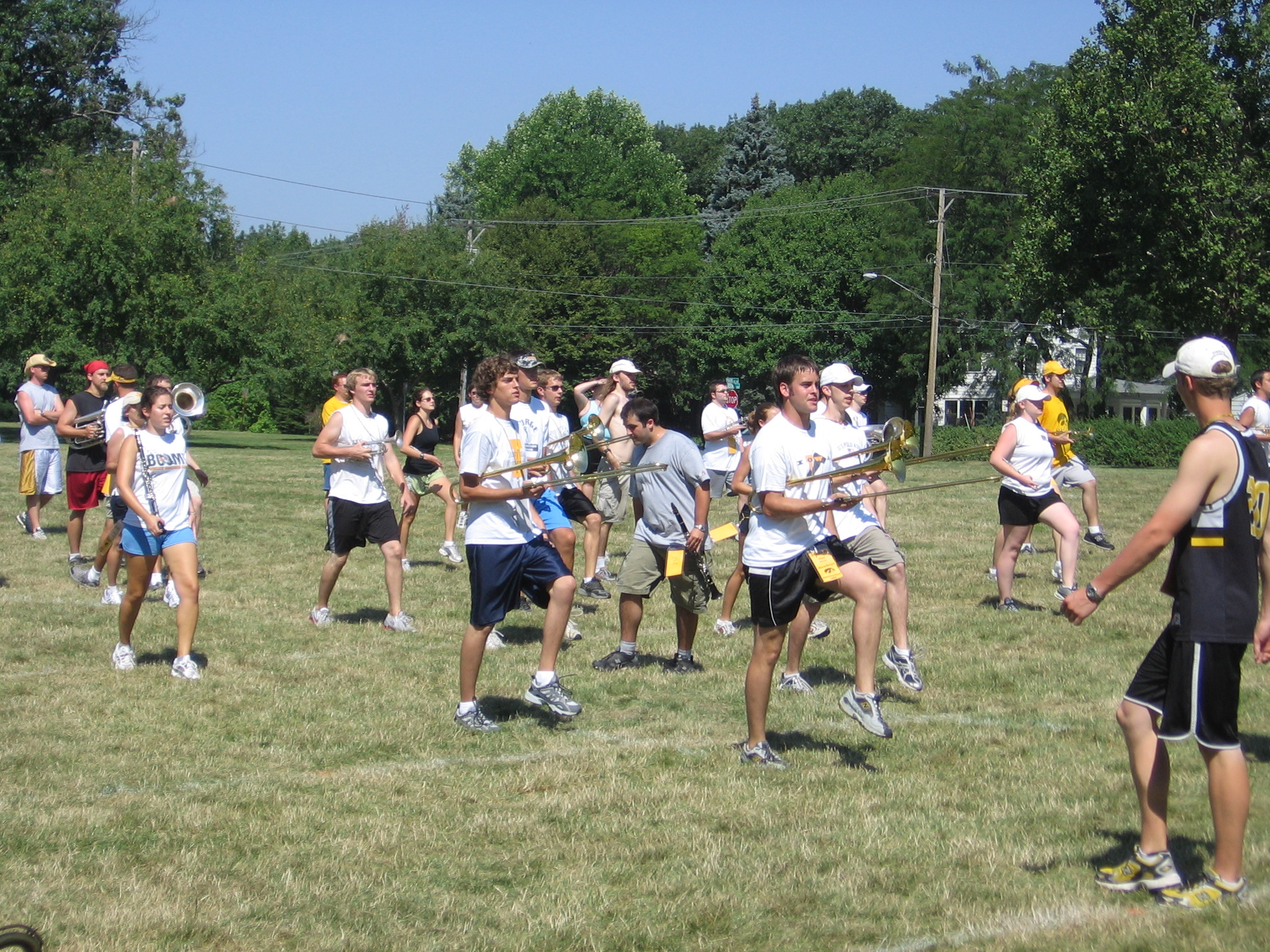
Members participate in the annual Drill Down during camp.

- Hawkeye Victory Polka - The HMB plays their rendition of the song "In Heaven There Is No Beer" after every Hawkeye victory. The band alternates between the verses instrumentally and vocally, along with Hawkeye fans. The song was originally played many times during a game when it was first introduced in the 1960s. However, controversy arose concerning the song's lyrics. Critics of the song claimed that the tune promoted the abuse of alcohol and that it was an inappropriate song for the band to play. In 2001, the University of Iowa President completely banned the song from being played, either instrumentally or vocally. However, overwhelming support for the song prompted the President to bring the song back to Hawkeye athletic events. The song is performed only after Hawkeye victories and on special occasions. The song was learned by ear for a number of years due to a lack of music and other unknown reasons, however starting in 2014, original sheet music was found after the 2008 flood which required the movement of all of the music in the University of Iowa's music library. Since then the band has used sheet music with the lyrics to the song printed along the bottom.
- Hey Jude - Arranged by former HMB director Tom Davis, this popular Beatles classic was first played during a halftime show in 1969. The band then began to play the song during the break between the 3rd and 4th quarters. The band has played "Hey Jude" in this way ever since. The song is conducted by the band manager; starting it off with a loud "THREE! FOUR!", as the band performs its signature rendition. The song is played during the band's Rec Building Concert, post-game performances and other special events.
- "Vocal Alma Mater" - Unlike some other schools in the Big Ten, the Iowa Alma Mater is not played on instruments at football games, due to the length of the song and the complexity of the lyrics and melodies. For this reason, the Alma Mater has been an 'unofficial trademark' of sorts for the HMB. They perform two versions of the Alma Mater, an instrumental ballad and a vocal version. The instrumental version is rarely played due to the popularity of the 4-part harmony vocal version. The band sings the vocal Alma Mater every week in the "tunnel" underneath Kinnick Stadium just before marching pre-game on the field. It is traditional that band members remove their marching shakos and/or hats, link arms and sway while performing the music. The band also sings the Alma Mater after the game is over and most fans have already cleared the stadium.
- The Boom - "The Boom" has become a trademark of the Hawkeye Marching Band. Occurring immediately prior to the band's pregame routine at games, the band's longtime announcer, Lou Crist, speaks through the stadium sound system "It's time to get ready for the boom!" Immediately as the word "boom' is said, the drum line's players all play a single count, creating a loud boom that echoes inside the stadium. The Boom signals the beginning of the pregame routine.
- Rec Building Concert - Before every home football game, the HMB performs a brief concert inside the UI Recreation Building along with the Iowa Dance Team, cheerleaders, and the school mascot Herky. The band stands in concentric arcs and plays the common pregame fight songs as well as that week's halftime music. "The Series", the band's marching cadence, is also performed. During the football season of 2016, due to unexpected complications with the project, construction on the Rec Building was unable to be completed before the start of football season. The construction was not completed until after the football season and after having tried to find a different location the band was no longer able to perform the Rec show for that season. This construction was to fix different problems with the Rec Building an install a new indoor raised track for the Track and Field Team. Due to the unstable nature of this raised track, the band is no longer able to perform "the Series" in the Rec Building Show. The band performs their pregame concert on the raised track inside the Rec Building as of 2017 football season.
- Bones and Tones - The Rec Building Concert's opening act. Members of the baritone and trombone sections combine to entertain the concert crowd with different musical selections every game. The music for these performances is typically arranged for multi-part bones and tones by the members themselves. The small ensemble features particular cheers and tunes unique to the two low brass sections.
- Trumpet's Pre-game Rec Building Music - Similar to Bones and Tones, the Trumpets will traditionally play a warm-up before the start of every rec building show. In recent years, the section has been adding more arrangements to their concert such as "All I Want for Christmas is You" by Mariah Carey that is played at the last home game of the year and other popular tunes such as the Fairly Odd Parents theme and songs from Aladdin. This traditionally goes 15 minutes before the start of the rec building show.
- Saxamatone Kickball - During camp, the baritone and saxophone (both alto and tenor) sections combine to play a game of kickball on the marching band's practice field. No other sections may participate in the competition, but the drum major, Golden Girl, and the band's Teaching Assistants, may participate as either players or as officials. In 2017, the saxophones came back in the bottom of the 10th from a 4-point deficit in a stunning overtime victory to clinch the saxamatone title, 13–12. For the 2018 match-up, not enough baritones showed up on time for the game. This led to two alto saxophone undergraduate staff members to be selected as captains and they chose their teams from the pool of all saxophones and all the present baritones. The very high scoring game was ended with the team selected by undergraduate staff member Tyler McKenzie winning over the section leader Nick deBlois' team 17–13. This is the first time the saxophones both won and lost.
- Annual Trombone-Trumpet Football Game - The Trumpets and Trombones play each other in a full-contact football game either during the bye week or first away game Iowa plays in which the band is not attending. The game is played for the coveted trophy "Lefty." The trophy consists of a left athletic running shoe and a trumpet and trombone mouthpiece affixed on a wooden plank that is spray painted gold. Men and women of both sections are encouraged to participate as well as spectate the event. The rest of the band is also encouraged to spectate but barred from participating since the game is exclusively played by Trumpets and Trombones. Following the windiest game ever, the Trombones notched their first win of the series in 2018. The following year the Trombones won 18–6, thanks to their unstoppable offense and a grimy defense. The Trumpets lead the series 4–2.
- "Sousie Bowl" - During the week of the Iowa/Iowa State rivalry game the sousaphone sections from both the Hawkeye Marching Band and the Iowa State University Marching Band come together for a game of full-contact football. This annual event alternates sites depending on which university is hosting the rivalry game that Saturday.
- The Salt Block - The Salt Block was just that - a block of salt commonly used in cattle feeding - carried along on band trips and events by the Sousaphone section. The block was featured at nearly every Sousie skit at the yearly Band Extravaganza. The tradition was that the Salt Block would be held for one year, then passed to another member of the Sousaphone section for safekeeping.
- Drill Down - Towards the end of camp, all members of the band participate in a competition known as the Drill Down. The band begins in a large block formation and the drum major calls out various commands. If a band member makes any sort of mistake during this competition, he/she is eliminated from the competition. It is common for the drum major to intentionally confuse band members in order to gauge their concentration and skill. The eliminations continue until only one member is left and crowned the winner. This practice was discontinued during the tenure of Professor Kastens.
- From Dixie with Love - During Morgan Jones' tenure as director the band would typically close out the annual Band Extravaganza with Dr. Jones' arrangement of "From Dixie with Love", a slow ballad utilizing the melody of the tune Dixie that crescendos into an uptempo song, still with "Dixie" as the melody. This was often referenced as a farewell to the graduating seniors during the concert. The tradition was discontinued following Jone's second stint as director.
