= Iowa–Iowa State football rivalry =

American college football rivalry

- Iowa Hawkeyes Iowa State Cyclones
- First meeting: October 1, 1894; Iowa State, 16–8
- Latest meeting: September 12, 2026; Iowa, 16–13
- Next meeting: September 11, 2027 at Ames
- Trophy: Cy–Hawk Trophy

Statistics
- Total meetings: 73
- All-time series: Iowa leads: 47–25 (.653)
- Trophy series: Iowa leads, 31–17–0 (.646)
- Largest victory: Iowa: 57–3 (1985); Iowa State: 31–0 (1978)
- Longest win streak: Iowa: 15 (1983–1997)
- Current win streak: Iowa: 1 (2026–present)

Locations of Iowa State and Iowa

The Iowa–Iowa State football rivalry is an American college football rivalry game between the Iowa State Cyclones and Iowa Hawkeyes. The Cy–Hawk Trophy is awarded to the winner of the game.

Conceived and created as a traveling trophy by the Greater Des Moines Athletic Club in 1976, the trophy was first presented to the winner by Iowa Governor Robert D. Ray in 1977. That game was the first meeting between the two since 1934. In the entire history of the rivalry, the game has never been contested anywhere beside Iowa City or Ames and alternates between the two respective campuses. Games in odd-numbered years are played in Ames at Iowa State University, and even-numbered years in Iowa City at the University of Iowa.

== Trophy design ==
The trophy design used through the 2010 season featured a football, a running back in the classic stiff-arm pose, and the likenesses of Iowa State's Cy the Cardinal and Iowa's Herky the Hawk. The trophy was replaced after the 2010 game, making it the only rivalry trophy with a sponsor attached to it. Since then the Cy–Hawk Trophy makes an annual tour with WHO sportscaster Keith Murphy the week before the game. It remains the recognizable symbol of the contest and, according to Murphy, "people love it."

A new trophy, donated by the Iowa Corn Growers Association, was introduced to the public during the Iowa State Fair on August 19, 2011. A sculpture atop the new trophy depicted a farm family with small children huddled about a bushel basket of corn. Dean Taylor, president of the Association, called it "a work of art that represents Iowans and their hard work." But within hours of its presentation, the new trophy was widely ridiculed in newspaper columns and internet postings. Governor Terry Branstad criticized it, as did retired Iowa head coach Hayden Fry, who said, "The farmer, family and corn is all wonderful, but I don't really get the relationship to a football game."

On August 23, the association's CEO, Craig Floss, announced that the new Cy–Hawk Trophy would be changed as a result of the bad public reaction. Selection of the new trophy would involve public input, and a temporary trophy was used for 2011. With fan input, the newly redesigned trophy was unveiled at the end of the 2012 game won by Iowa State; it featured mascots of the two universities, a raised football, and corn in the background.

== Game results ==
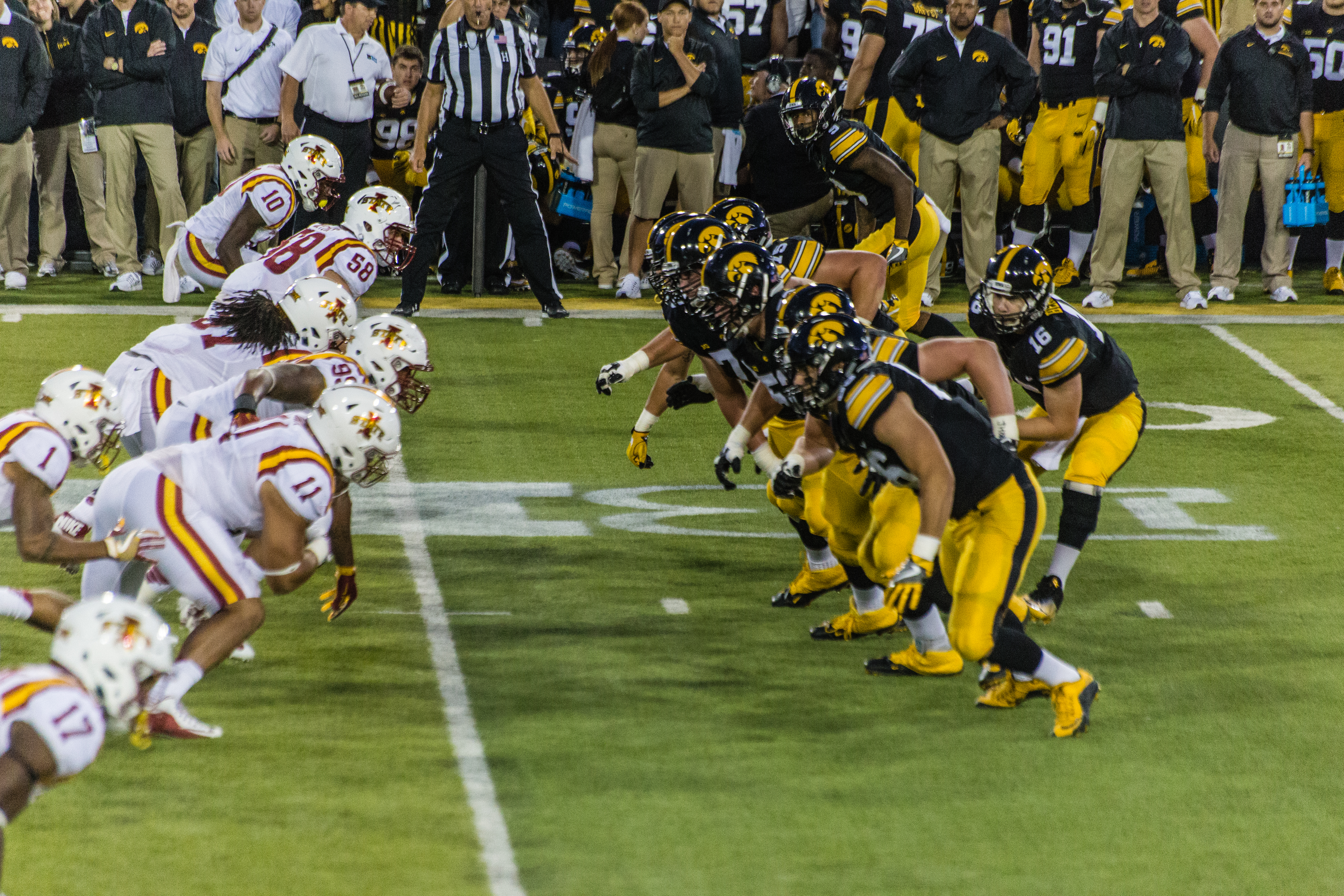
Iowa and Iowa State facing off in 2016 at Kinnick Stadium.

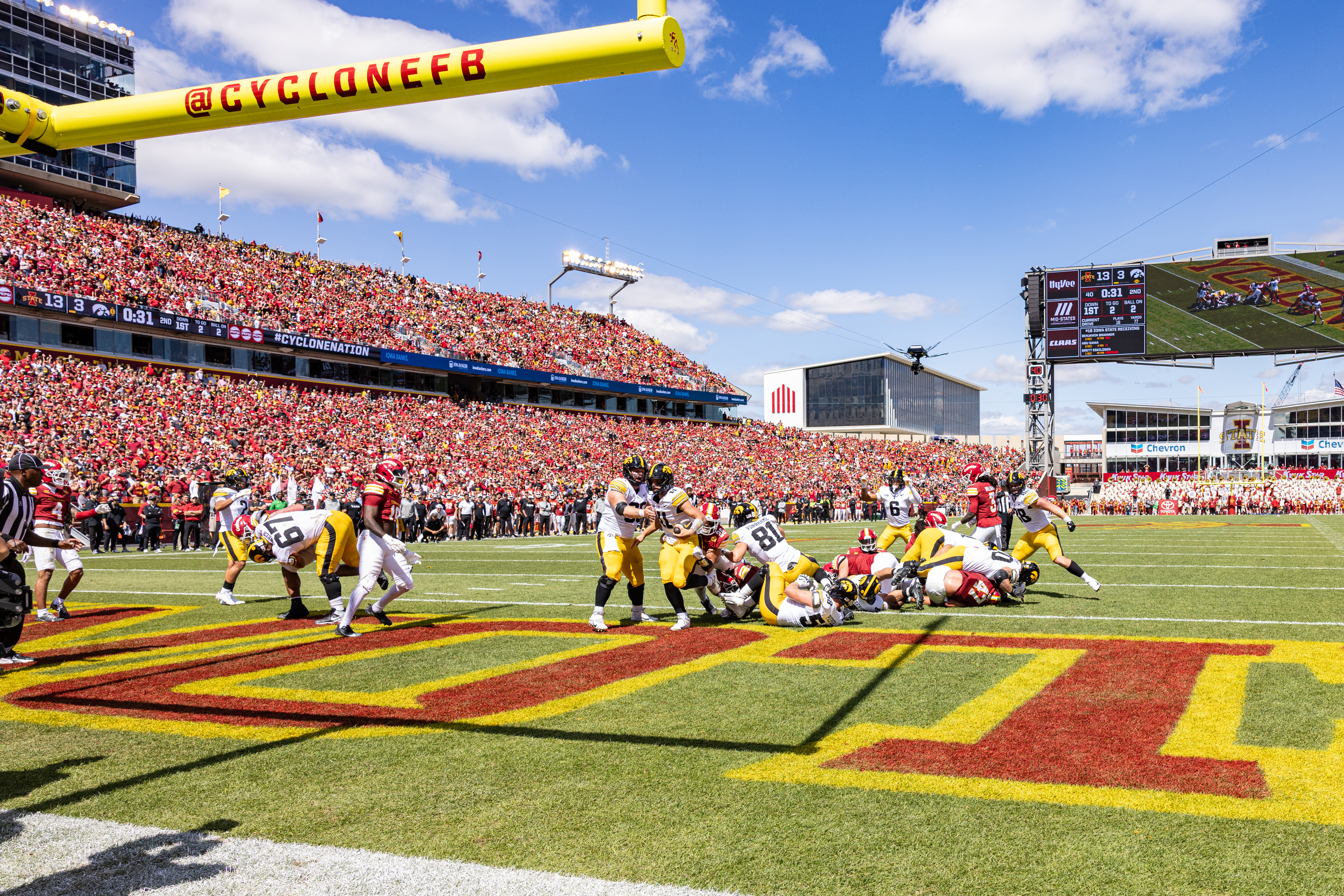
A touchdown is scored during the 2025 game at Jack Trice Stadium

The two schools played each other 24 times between 1894 and 1934, before the Cy–Hawk Trophy was established in 1977. The series halted after 1934 after Iowa head coach (and athletic director) Ossie Solem would not return calls to reschedule the rivalry; after more than four decades, the series was restarted in 1977. Of the 72 games in the series through 2025, 42 were played in Iowa City and 30 in Ames.

Games in the series are often decided by less than seven points, regardless of the pregame ranking of the teams. The game was canceled in 2020 due to the COVID-19 pandemic, marking the first time since 1976 that the rivalry was not played.

The 2019 game featured an appearance by ESPN College GameDay, the first time Iowa State had hosted the program. GameDay returned for the 2021 edition, which was the first time the rivalry feature both teams ranked in the AP Top 10. The 2025 game played in Ames was highlighted by a visit from FOX with their Big Noon Kickoff.

Home field advantage has not been a major factor in the series as of recently. Since 2010, the home team has only won four times, and until Iowa State's 2025 victory, the home team had not won since 2018.

Iowa victories	Iowa State victories	Tie games

No.	Date	Location	Winner	Score
1	October 1, 1894	Iowa City	Iowa State	16–8
2	October 28, 1895	Iowa City	Iowa State	24–0
3	November 5, 1897	Iowa City	Iowa State	12–0
4	October 28, 1899	Iowa City	Iowa	5–0
5	October 18, 1901	Iowa City	Iowa	6–0
6	November 1, 1902	Iowa City	Iowa	16–12
7	October 29, 1904	Iowa City	Iowa	10–6
8	November 24, 1905	Ames	Iowa	8–0
9	November 24, 1906	Iowa City	Iowa State	2–0
10	November 23, 1907	Ames	Iowa State	20–14
11	November 13, 1909	Iowa City	Iowa	13–0
12	November 5, 1910	Ames	Iowa	2–0
13	November 18, 1911	Iowa City	Iowa State	9–0
14	November 16, 1912	Ames	Iowa	20–7
15	November 15, 1913	Iowa City	Iowa	45–7
16	November 14, 1914	Ames	Iowa	26–6
17	November 13, 1915	Iowa City	Iowa State	16–0
18	November 18, 1916	Ames	Iowa	19–16
19	November 24, 1917	Iowa City	Iowa	6–3
20	November 16, 1918	Iowa City	Iowa	21–0
21	November 22, 1919	Iowa City	Iowa	10–0
22	November 20, 1920	Ames	Iowa	14–10
23	November 4, 1933	Iowa City	Iowa	27–7
24	October 20, 1934	Ames	Iowa State	31–6
25	September 17, 1977	Iowa City	Iowa	12–10
26	September 23, 1978	Iowa City	#20 Iowa State	31–0
27	September 29, 1979	Iowa City	Iowa	30–14
28	September 27, 1980	Iowa City	Iowa State	10–7
29	September 19, 1981	Ames	Iowa State	23–12
30	September 18, 1982	Iowa City	Iowa State	19–7
31	September 10, 1983	Ames	#10 Iowa	51–10
32	September 8, 1984	Iowa City	#10 Iowa	59–21
33	September 28, 1985	Ames	#3 Iowa	57–3
34	September 13, 1986	Iowa City	Iowa	43–7
35	September 19, 1987	Ames	Iowa	48–9
36	September 24, 1988	Iowa City	Iowa	10–3
37	September 23, 1989	Ames	Iowa	31–21
38	September 22, 1990	Iowa City	Iowa	45–35

No.	Date	Location	Winner	Score
39	September 14, 1991	Ames	#14 Iowa	29–10
40	September 12, 1992	Iowa City	Iowa	21–7
41	September 11, 1993	Ames	Iowa	31–28
42	September 10, 1994	Iowa City	Iowa	37–9
43	September 16, 1995	Ames	Iowa	27–10
44	September 14, 1996	Iowa City	#21 Iowa	38–13
45	September 20, 1997	Ames	#13 Iowa	63–20
46	September 12, 1998	Iowa City	Iowa State	27–9
47	September 11, 1999	Ames	Iowa State	17–10
48	September 16, 2000	Iowa City	Iowa State	24–14
49	November 24, 2001	Ames	Iowa State	17–14
50	September 14, 2002	Iowa City	Iowa State	36–31
51	September 13, 2003	Ames	#23 Iowa	40–21
52	September 11, 2004	Iowa City	#16 Iowa	17–10
53	September 10, 2005	Ames	Iowa State	23–3
54	September 16, 2006	Iowa City	#16 Iowa	27–17
55	September 15, 2007	Ames	Iowa State	15–13
56	September 13, 2008	Iowa City	Iowa	17–5
57	September 12, 2009	Ames	Iowa	35–3
58	September 11, 2010	Iowa City	#9 Iowa	35–7
59	September 10, 2011	Ames	Iowa State	44–41^{3OT}
60	September 8, 2012	Iowa City	Iowa State	9–6
61	September 14, 2013	Ames	Iowa	27–21
62	September 13, 2014	Iowa City	Iowa State	20–17
63	September 12, 2015	Ames	Iowa	31–17
64	September 10, 2016	Iowa City	#16 Iowa	42–3
65	September 9, 2017	Ames	Iowa	44–41^{OT}
66	September 8, 2018	Iowa City	Iowa	13–3
67	September 14, 2019	Ames	#19 Iowa	18–17
68	September 11, 2021	Ames	#10 Iowa	27–17
69	September 10, 2022	Iowa City	Iowa State	10–7
70	September 9, 2023	Ames	Iowa†	20–13
71	September 7, 2024	Iowa City	Iowa State	20–19
72	September 6, 2025	Ames	#16 Iowa State	16–13
73	September 12, 2026	Iowa City	#21 Iowa	16–13
Series: Iowa leads 48–25
† Iowa vacated its 2023 victory due to the use of an ineligible player.

== See also ==
- List of NCAA college football rivalry games
- Iowa–Iowa State rivalry in other sports
