= On Iowa =

University of Iowa fight song

Song
- Written: 1919
- Published: 1919
- Genre: Fight song
- Songwriter: W.R. Law

"On Iowa" is one of three fight songs currently used by the University of Iowa Hawkeye Marching Band along with the Iowa Fight Song and Roll Along Iowa. The lyrics were written W.R. Law in 1919.

== Music links ==
- MP3 and lyrics
- Full lyrics

== Lyrics ==
On Iowa, proudly at the fore
On, Iowa, on for evermore
Ev'ry loyal son will give a rousing toast to you,
Ev'ry loyal daughter loves you true,
On, Iowa, with your wealth untold,
A heritage to us you did unfold,
Love of family, love of friend,
Love of country too, makes us proud for what you stand,
Our dear Old Gold.

Who, wha, wah; Who, wah, wah.

IOWA! IOWA!

Who, wha, wah; Who, wah, wah.

I-O-W-A!

Chorus:
FIGHT, IOWA, never, never yield,
FIGHT, IOWA, fight right down the field.
Get in the game and watch the ball,
Be a fighting man,
Hit 'er hard, give Iowa all you can.
FIGHT, IOWA, you'll be sure to hold,
We're with you with the pep and love of old.
FIGHT for family, FIGHT for friend:
FIGHT for country too,
But fight hard today and win for dear OLD GOLD.

== See also ==
- Hawkeye Marching Band
