= Iowa Fight Song =

University of Iowa fight song

The "Iowa Fight Song" is one of three fight songs currently used by the University of Iowa Hawkeye Marching Band along with "On Iowa" and "Roll Along Iowa". The music and lyrics were written by Iowa native Meredith Willson, also author of The Music Man, in 1950. The song is mostly a contrafact to his hit, "It's Beginning to Look a Lot Like Christmas," much in the same way that "76 Trombones" and "Goodnight, My Someone" from The Music Man are based on the same harmonic structure.

The song was used in a 2007 commercial for the Iowa Lottery, where a Hawkeye fan sings different words to it for an instant ticket game. Meredith Willson's widow, Rosemary, protested the song's use in a lottery commercial, while university faculty members urged the athletic department to distance itself from the state lottery, fearing it would promote gambling. The advertisement was pulled soon after.

Lyrics

The word is “Fight! Fight! Fight! for IOWA,”

Let every loyal Iowan sing;

The word is “Fight! Fight! Fight! for IOWA,”

Until the walls and rafters ring (Go Hawks!)

Come on and cheer, cheer, cheer for IOWA,

Come on and cheer until you hear the final gun.

The word is “Fight! Fight! Fight! for IOWA,”

Until the game is won.

== See also ==
- Hawkeye Marching Band
