= Roll Along Iowa =

"Roll Along Iowa" is one of three fight songs currently used by the University of Iowa Hawkeye Marching Band along with On Iowa and the Iowa Fight Song. The lyrics were written by John Woodman in 1954.

Lyrics

Roll along, Iowa, Roll down the field, On to victory! Roll along, Iowa, Don’t ever yield, Always a winner be! Get that ball, Give your all, For dear Old Gold, Raise her banner high! With firm endeavor, Roll on forever, U of I.*

- Until 1964 (officially, Oct. 22, 1964), the name of the university in the lyrics was "S. U. I." referring to the State University of Iowa. Thereafter, the university's name was changed to the University of Iowa, and more commonly known as "U. of I.," resulting in a slight change to the lyrics.
