= Herky the Hawk =

Mascot of the University of Iowa

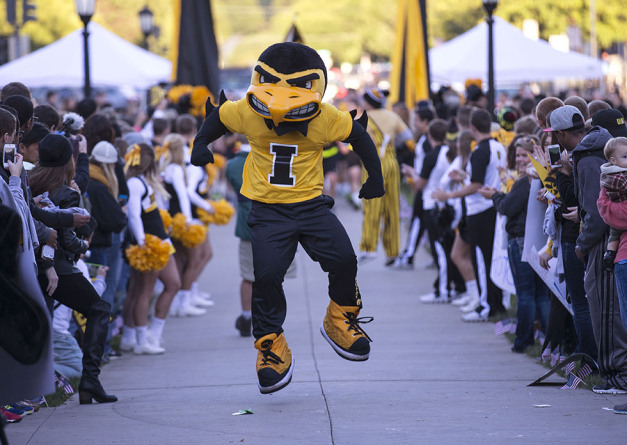
- Herky the Hawk performing at the Beat State Pep Rally in 2014.
- University: University of Iowa
- Conference: Big Ten
- Description: Anthropomorphic hawk
- First seen: 1948

Herky the Hawk is the athletics mascot of the University of Iowa Hawkeyes. Herky was drawn as a cartoon in 1948, and was first portrayed at a football game in 1959. Periodically, Herky's wardrobe and overall design have been updated. Herky can be seen at University of Iowa events.

== History ==
=== Hawkeyes ===
The state of Iowa acquired the nickname chiefly through the efforts of newspaper editor James G. Edwards of Fort Madison and Judge David Rorer of Burlington. The city of Burlington had been established in 1833 after the Black Hawk War of 1832. Edwards proposed the nickname "Hawk-eyes" in 1838 to "...rescue from oblivion a memento, at least of the name of the old chief" Black Hawk. In 1843 Edwards moved his newspaper, the Fort Madison Patriot, to Burlington and renamed it the Burlington Hawkeye in tribute to his friend Black Hawk (who was not a chief).

The name "Hawkeye" was already in the public conscience through James Fenimore Cooper's bestselling The Last of the Mohicans of the 1820s and 1830s where Hawkeye was the Indian name of the series' protagonist, Natty Bumppo. It is thought by some that this popularity helped Rorer and Edwards' campaign to make Hawkeyes a nickname for Iowans. The university borrowed its athletic nickname from the state of Iowa, also known as the Hawkeye State.

=== Before Herky ===
The University of Iowa Football team’s first mascot was a live black bear cub named Burch. Burch was the team’s mascot from 1908-1910. The bear was acquired by Iowa football coach Mark Catlin in 1908 and brought to Iowa City via express. Burch lived at Iowa Field in a cage and went with the team to away games.

=== Birth of Herky ===
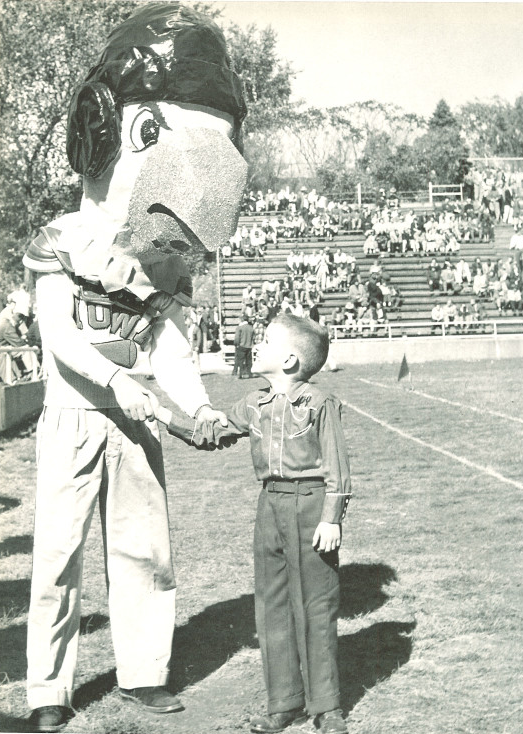
Herky the Hawk, c. 1955

In 1948, journalism instructor Richard Spencer III, drew a caricature of a hawk for the university's athletic department, who was looking for a symbol to represent the athletic teams. The university liked the drawing and adapted it, but left the naming of the bird to the fans through a statewide contest. John Franklin, a Belle Plaine, Iowa alumnus, suggested Hercules the Hawk and the name was later shortened to Herky.

=== Herky takes the field ===
Herky first appeared as a costumed mascot during a football game in 1959. Herky's appearances at games included pranks on other mascots and hazardous stunts, which led to university officials to decide to put an end to the costumed version of Herky. However, Larry Herb, a transfer student, had a desire to portray Herky, and convinced administrators to give him a chance. It was Herb's enthusiasm that also led to a fiberglass headpiece being manufactured and other changes being made to the costume. When Herb, a member of Delta Tau Delta, left the university, he handed the duties of being Herky off to one of his fraternity brothers. This led to a longstanding tradition of only Delts being inside Herky's costume. However, in 1998 the Delts lost their charter, and since that time the university has held open tryouts for prospective Herkys. It was at these tryouts where Angie Anderson and Carrie MacDonald were the first female students chosen to be the mascot in 1999.

== Herky today ==
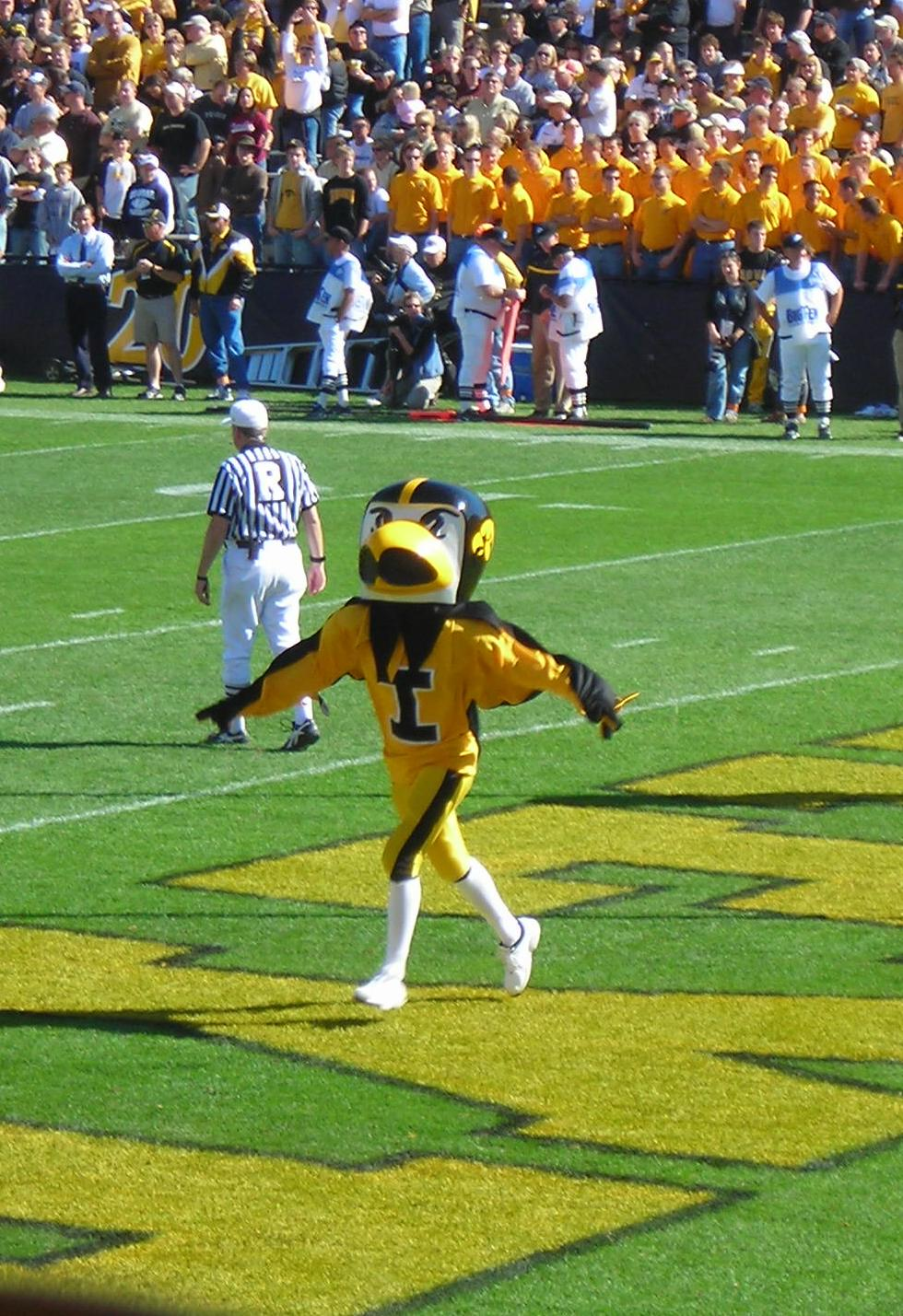
Herky in Kinnick Stadium (prior to 2014).

The current Herky mascot has a fuzzy face and eyebrows and has been used since 2014. Prior to 2014, the mascot helmet was made from fiberglass.

The most common depiction of Herky today is a result of the athletic department's decision in the early 1980s to use Herky as a marketing tool. A universal version of Herky that could be used for all sports was needed. Native Iowa City artist Charles Reed based his drawing of Herky on two sources: former Hawkeye wrestler Barry Davis and cartoon character Mighty Mouse.

On November 22, 1997, during a below freezing Iowa 31-0 football victory over Minnesota at Kinnick Stadium, a Golden Gopher drummer had a cup of water thrown on his face by Herky after the drummer used his drumstick to tap Herky on his shoulder pad. As Herky skipped away he was tackled from behind by the drummer. Rather than take a hand offered to help the mascot to his feet, Herky broke the drummer's glasses with a punch to the face. The result of Herky's assault on the drummer was the breaking of the historic 40-year-old cheer-bird's head. Members of the Minnesota band took small trophy pieces of the broken helmet back to Minnesota. The helmet was re-made of Kevlar for the 1998 season.

Herky is also involved in occasional gimmicks, such as the Alumni Herky with a white beard who appears alongside the normal Herky at the annual homecoming game, and in 2010, a special Captain America-themed Herky was introduced during Iowa's football game with Michigan State.

In 2004, as part of the 75th anniversary of Kinnick Stadium, the University of Iowa athletic department and Iowa City/Coralville Convention & Visitors Bureau partnered with the cities of Iowa City, Coralville and University Heights to organize "Herky on Parade". 90 different statues of Herky, each decorated with a different theme, were placed on campus and in the surrounding communities.

Herky has become a regular representative of Iowa athletics in national mascot competitions. Herky began participating in the Universal Cheerleading Association's mascot competition in 2004. In 2006 Herky made his first appearance in the national finals in Orlando, FL and placed 8th out of 10. Herky qualified for the finals a second time in 2008.
