= Iowa Hawkeyes =

University of Iowa athletic teams

- University: University of Iowa
- Nickname: Hawkeyes
- NCAA: Division I (FBS)
- Conference: Big Ten
- Athletic director: Beth Goetz
- Location: Iowa City, Iowa
- Varsity teams: 20 (7 men's, 13 women's)
- Football stadium: Kinnick Stadium
- Arena: Carver-Hawkeye Arena
- Baseball stadium: Duane Banks Field
- Wrestling arena: Carver Hawkeye Arena
- Other venues: Beckwith Boathouse; Francis X. Cretzmeyer Track; Iowa Field House; Xtream Arena powered by Mediacom
- Colors: Black and gold
- Mascot: Herky the Hawk
- Fight song: "Iowa Fight Song" "On Iowa!" "Roll Along Iowa" "Iowa Victory Polka"
- Website: hawkeyesports.com

Big Ten logo in Iowa's colors

The Iowa Hawkeyes are the athletic teams that represent the University of Iowa, located in Iowa City, Iowa, United States. The Hawkeyes have varsity teams in 20 sports, 7 for men and 13 for women; The teams participate in Division I of the National Collegiate Athletic Association (NCAA) and are members of the Big Ten Conference (since 1899). Currently, the school's athletic director is Beth Goetz.

Historically, Iowa has been very successful in men's wrestling, with 37 team Big Ten championships and 24 team national championships. The Hawkeyes have also won national championships in five other sports: men's gymnastics, football, field hockey, rifle and women's track and field. In basketball, Iowa has reached the NCAA Final Four on six occasions. The men's team has done this three times, most recently in 1980, and the women's team has also done it three times, in 1993, 2023 and 2024. The baseball team has reached the Men's College World Series once, in 1972. Iowa's softball team has played in the Women's College World Series on four occasions, most recently in 2001.

Football home games are played at Kinnick Stadium, while basketball, gymnastics, and wrestling events are held at Carver–Hawkeye Arena. The school's baseball team plays at Duane Banks Field and the softball team plays at Bob Pearl Softball Field. Women's volleyball plays at Xtream Arena in the nearby city of Coralville.

== Sports sponsored ==
Men's sports	Women's sports
Baseball	Basketball
Basketball	Cross country
Cross country	Field hockey
Football	Golf
Golf	Gymnastics
Track and field^{†}	Rowing
Wrestling	Soccer
	Softball
	Swimming & diving
	Tennis
	Track and field^{†}
	Volleyball
	Wrestling
† – Track and field includes both indoor and outdoor.

The University of Iowa currently fields 22 varsity teams, competing in the Big Ten Conference. Three men's teams – gymnastics, swimming and diving, and tennis – were eliminated after the 2020–21 academic year to help address a projected $60–75 million deficit related to the COVID-19 pandemic.

=== Men's sports ===
==== Baseball ====
Iowa began playing baseball in 1890, when the Hawkeyes went a combined 2–1 (two wins and one loss) against two teams, Cornell and Vinton. To date, Iowa has won eight Big Ten titles, and in 1972 Iowa earned its way to the CWS at Rosenblatt Stadium in Omaha with a 13–3 Big Ten record, which is still the best Big Ten winning percentage in Iowa baseball history. That record included another school record that still stands, an 11-game Big Ten winning streak. It was Iowa's first outright Big Ten baseball title since 1939, and the last one since, although the Hawkeyes did earn ties for the conference championship in 1974 and 1990.

But that 1972 Iowa team fought its way to Omaha the hard way, losing its first game in the regional tournament, then winning doubleheaders on consecutive days on the campus of Bowling Green University in Ohio. Lose one of those four games, and Iowa goes home. In 1972, only conference champions competed for the eight World Series berths.

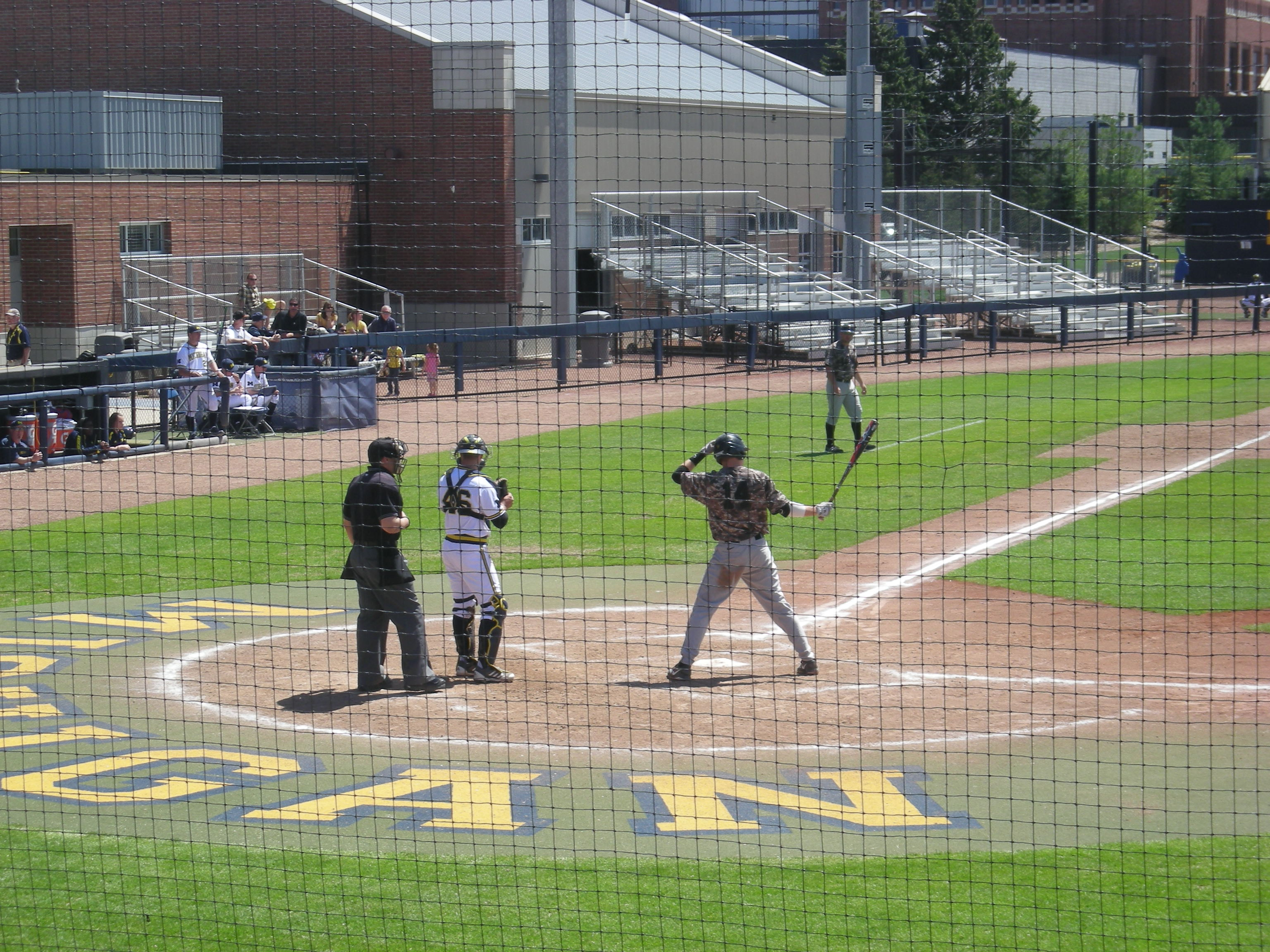
Iowa vs Michigan game in 2013

The Hawkeyes opened the 1972 CWS against #1-ranked Arizona State, who entered the game with an incredible record of 60 wins and only 4 losses. But Iowa, a huge underdog, outhit the Sun Devils 8–3 only to lose, 2–1. Iowa had the tying run thrown out at the plate in the 9th inning, and left another runner at third as the final out was made. Iowa had also threatened in the 7th with a lead-off double, but could not score. The Hawkeyes then played in the losers' bracket the next day against Temple. But after taking a 6–2 lead into the sixth inning, the Hawkeyes ended up being knocked out of the Series with a 12–8 loss. Arizona State lost the championship game that year to Southern Cal, while Temple finished 3rd. The Hawkeyes finished ranked No. 9 in the nation, still the highest national ranking in the history of Iowa Hawkeye baseball. Future Major Leaguer Jim Sundberg, catcher from Galesburg, Ill., was one of the team leaders. The Hawkeyes featured several Iowans in the starting lineup, including Tom Hurn (1B – Cedar Rapids), Mike Kielkopf (2B-Ottumwa), Brad Trickey (3B-Cedar Rapids), along with the top two starting pitchers, Mark Tschopp (Cedar Rapids) and Bill Heckroth (Dysart).

Iowa plays its home games at Duane Banks Field, whose namesake is the winningest baseball coach in school history. Rick Heller replaced Jack Dahm as the Hawkeyes' head baseball coach in 2013. In his first season in Iowa City, Heller helped guide the Hawkeyes to a 9–1 start—the program's best start since 1940—a Big Ten tournament berth and conference tournament win. Iowa finished the year with a 30–23 record for just the third 30-win season since 1993. The 30 victories are the most by a first-year coach in Iowa history.

==== Basketball ====
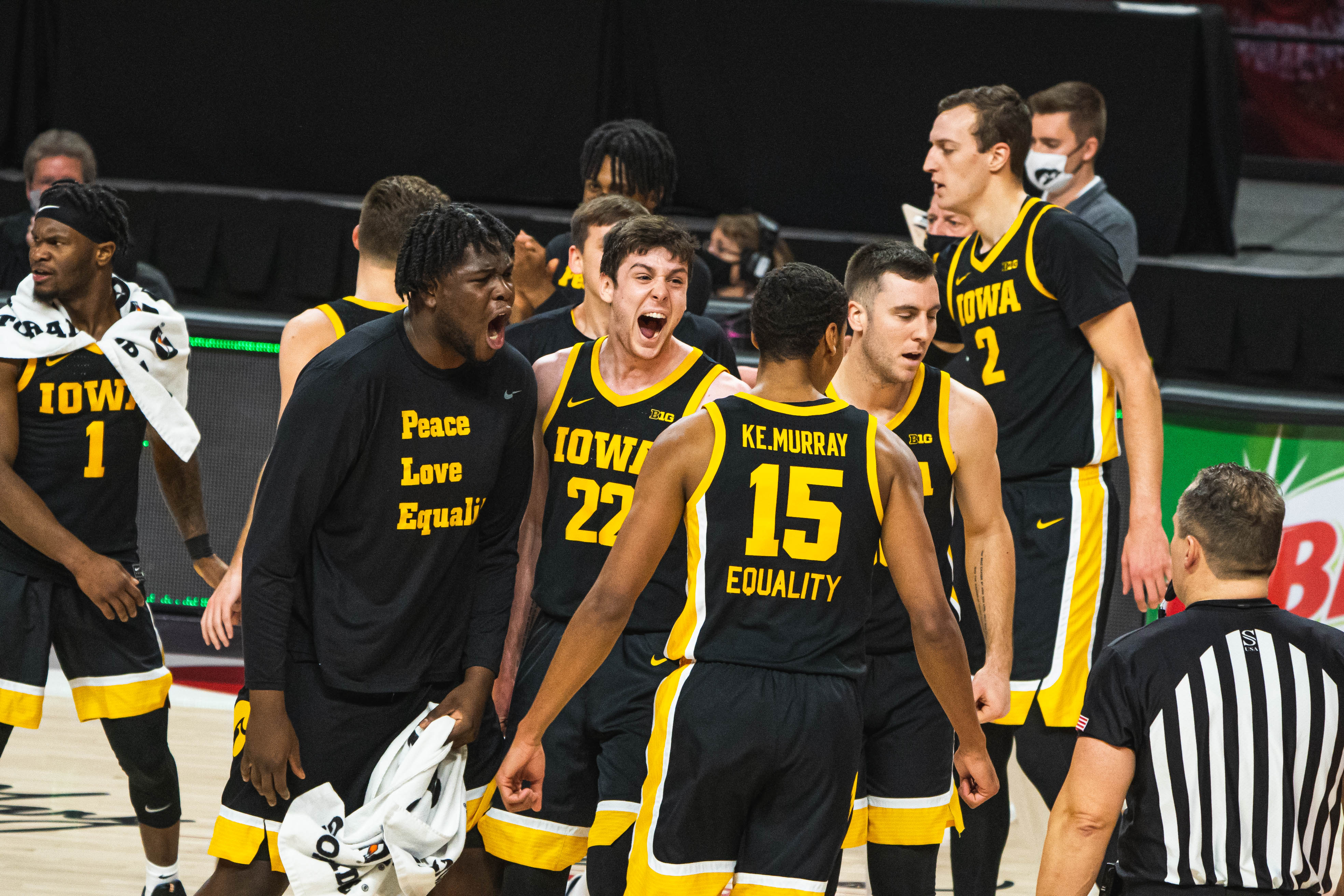
The Hawkeyes celebrate a win in 2021

Men's basketball as a varsity sport at the University of Iowa began in 1902, but it was on January 18, 1896, that Iowa played the University of Chicago in the first five-on-five college basketball game. The Maroons won that game, 15–12. Six years later, men's basketball became a sanctioned varsity sport under head coach Ed Rule. Rule coached the Hawkeyes in four non-consecutive seasons until 1908, compiling a 37–15 record.

Iowa began competing in Big Ten games in 1909, and since then the Hawkeyes have won eight regular season Big Ten championships, the last in 1979. Iowa's first Big Ten title came in 1923, under coach Sam Barry. Barry also led the Hawkeyes to their second conference championship in 1926. Following Rollie Williams' 13 seasons, which lasted until 1942, Pops Harrison became coach. Harrison coached at Iowa until 1951, leading the Hawkeyes to their first unshared Big Ten championship in 1945.

Perhaps the most-successful time period in Iowa basketball came under head coach Bucky O'Connor, who coached at Iowa until his death in 1958. Under O'Connor, the Hawkeyes played in two Final Four events, while winning two unshared Big Ten championships. Iowa played in the national championship game against San Francisco in 1956, but lost by 12 after taking an early double-digit lead. The Hawkeyes played in a third Final Four in 1980, and have also won the Big Ten tournament thrice since its 1998 inception, in 2001, 2006, and 2022. Iowa's current coach is Ben McCollum, who coached at Drake University before coming to Iowa in 2025. The Hawkeyes have played their home games in Carver–Hawkeye Arena since 1983; the arena can currently hold up to 15,500 people.

==== Cross country ====
The Hawkeyes' men's cross country team won team Big Ten titles in 1961 and 1966 and have also had nine individual Big Ten champions, most recently with Larry Wieczorek in 1967. Wieczorek's time in the 8,000 meter race still stands as the sixth-quickest time in school history. To date, Deacon Jones is Iowa's lone national champion, having won the award in 1957. Both Jones and Wieczorek were all-Americans for the Hawkeyes, along with Kevin Herd, Stetson Steele, and Ted Wheeler.

==== Football ====
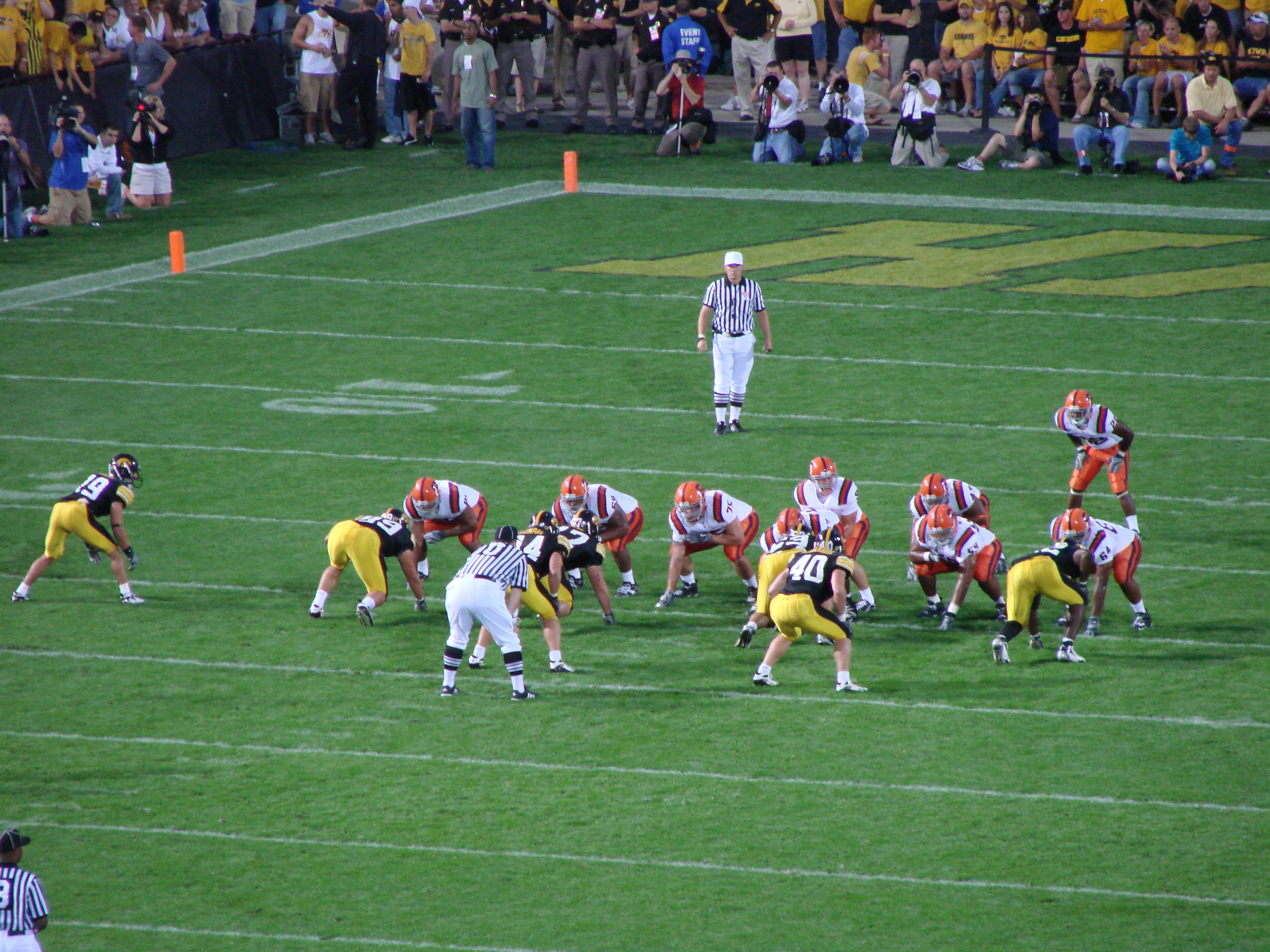
Iowa's defense lines up against Syracuse on September 8, 2007

Football at the University of Iowa dates back as far as November 27, 1872, when the Iowa Academics played a game against the University of Iowa College of Law. However, football was not officially recognized as a varsity sport until November 16, 1889, when the Hawkeyes played against and lost to Grinnell. The next year, Iowa got its first win against Iowa Wesleyan, and since then, the Hawkeyes have won 11 Big Ten championships and have played in 30 post-season bowl games. The Hawkeyes are 18–16–1 in such games, having most recently won against Kentucky in the 2022 Music City Bowl. Iowa won the 2010 Orange Bowl vs Georgia Tech Yellow Jackets 24–14. The Orange Bowl is a BCS bowl game. Iowa's first bowl game was the 1957 Rose Bowl, which ended in a 35–19 win over Oregon State. The Hawkeyes' lone claim to a national championship came after winning the Rose Bowl following the 1958 season, when they were awarded the Grantland Rice trophy by the Football Writers Association of America.

The Hawkeyes' current head coach is Kirk Ferentz. In nineteen seasons under Ferentz, the Hawkeyes have won a BCS bowl, two Big Ten titles and have played in fifteen bowl games. Ferentz is the all time Iowa football wins leader with 151 after surpassing his predecessor, Hayden Fry, during the 2018 football season. Fry, who coached the Hawkeyes for 20 seasons, had 143 wins, three Big Ten titles, and 14 bowl trips in his tenure at Iowa. Fry also led the Hawkeyes to eight-straight bowl games from 1981 to 1988, the longest such streak in program history. Fry was inducted into the College Football Hall of Fame in 2003. In 2015, the Hawks made it to the Rose Bowl and lost to Stanford.

Since 1929, the Hawkeyes have played their home games in Kinnick Stadium. Renamed in 1972 in honor of Iowa's lone Heisman Trophy winner, Nile Kinnick, the stadium can currently hold up to 70,585 fans. Kinnick won the Heisman Award following the conclusion of the 1939 season, but died on June 2, 1943, in the Gulf of Paria during a World War II training flight. His face can still be seen today, on the coins that officials toss at the beginning of all Big Ten games.

==== Golf ====
Since Iowa began competing in men's golf, the Hawkeyes have won the Big Ten team title once, in 1992. Brad Klapprott won an individual Big Ten championship that year, becoming only the second Iowa men's golfer to do so. He was preceded only by John Jacobs, who achieved the individual conference championship in 1946. Sean McCarty also added to the 1992 team's accolades in winning the Big Ten Freshman of the Year award. In 1995, McCarty became Iowa's first and only men's golf all-American.

==== Gymnastics ====
Iowa's men's gymnastics team is credited with winning the first NCAA national championship in school history in 1969. This, in turn, allowed the University of Iowa to become the last of all the Big Ten schools to have won a national championship in an NCAA-sponsored sport. The Hawkeyes have also won seven Big Ten team titles, the last coming in 1998. On the individual level, 12 Hawkeyes have won national championships. Michael Reavis is Iowa's most-recent national champion, having won on vault in 2005.

==== Swimming and diving ====
Men's swimming became a sanctioned varsity sport at the University of Iowa in 1917, with David Armbruster as the team's coach. Coaching from 1917 to 1958, Armbruster led the Hawkeyes to one Big Ten championship, in 1936. He was followed by Robert Allen, who coached the Hawkeyes until 1975. Under Allen, Iowa's best finish in the Big Ten was fifth, on two occasions. Glenn Patton was next in the line of coaches, and during his tenure, the Hawkeyes won two Big Ten championships and finished as high as eighth on the national level. Currently, Marc Long is Iowa's men's and women's swimming coach.

On 19 occasions has a men's swimmer at Iowa won an individual national championship. Ray Walters was the Hawkeyes' first national champion, having won the 50 meter freestyle in 1936. Nine of Iowa's national championships in men's swimming, however, are credited to Artur Wojdat, who competed at the collegiate level from 1989 to 1992. Wojdat was an 18-time all-American, a 10-time Big Ten champion, and a four-time national champion in the 500 yard freestyle event. Wojdat also won the bronze medal in the 400 meter freestyle at the 1988 Summer Olympics in Seoul, South Korea. Receiving NCAA Swimmer of the Year in 2010 & 2011 while on the University of Florida swim team, Olympian Conor Dwyer swam with the Hawkeyes swim team on scholarship for his first two collegiate seasons: the Hawkeyes were the only university to offer Dwyer a scholarship after high school.

==== Tennis ====
Men's tennis became a varsity sport at Iowa in 1939, and from that time to the present, the Hawkeyes have won the Big Ten championship once, in 1958. That year, the Hawkeyes recorded a 10–1 team record and finished third at the national level. In 1998, Tyler Cleveland won the Big Ten Freshman of the Year Award. He later won the Big Ten Player of the Year Award twice, in 2000 and 2001. Cleveland and as of 2013 14 other men's tennis players had been named to an all-Big Ten team. The team is currently coached by Ross Wilson.

Kareem Al Allaf holds the all-time wins record for singles and doubles combined in college tennis at the University of Iowa, with 164 combined wins for the Hawkeyes, for whom he played from 2016 to 2021. Allaf earned three All-Big Ten honors.

==== Track ====
In indoor track, the Hawkeyes have won three team Big Ten titles, the last coming in 1963. On the individual level, Iowa has had 64 Big Ten championships. Nine-time Big Ten champion Bashir Yamini won three of his Big Ten titles in indoor competitions. Named the 1996 Big Ten Indoor Freshman of the Year, Yamini won the indoor long jump every year from 1997 through 1999. 10 Iowa relays have also been named Big Ten champions, most-recently in 1989.

In outdoor track competition, Iowa has won team Big Ten titles in 1963, 1967, 2011, 2019, and 2021. Their 2011 championship ended a 44-year drought. Iowa jumped Minnesota on the last day of the tournament by placing ahead of the Golden Gophers in the 4x400 – the last event of the tournament. Since 1902, the Hawkeyes have had 92 separate individual Big Ten championships. Yamini currently shares the Big Ten Outdoor Championships long jump record with Ohio State's Jesse Owens. Former Iowa football player Tim Dwight also competed in track. Dwight won the 100 meter Big Ten championship in 1999 with a time of 10.51 seconds.

The men's and women's track teams have collectively produced 17 different Olympians including 6 medalists.

==== Wrestling ====
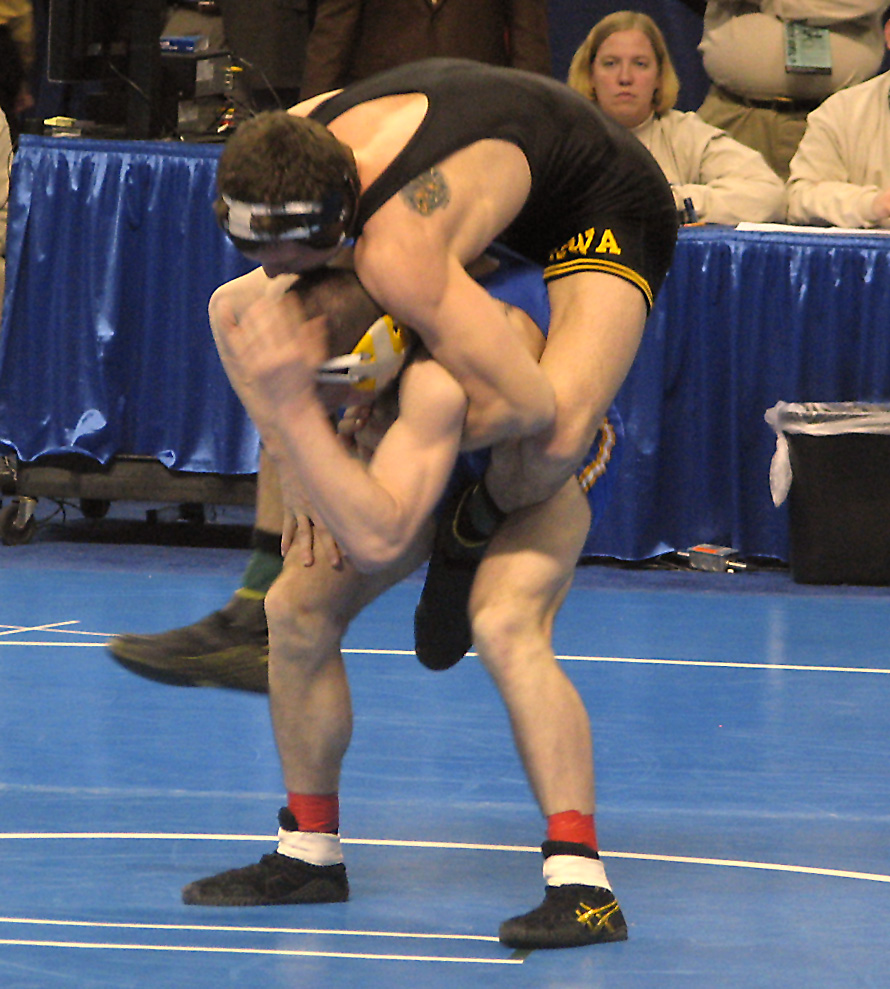
Mark Perry wrestles Michael Patrovich of Hofstra on March 16, 2007, in Auburn Hills, Michigan.

Wrestling at the University of Iowa began with the 1910–1911 season. Under coach E. G. Schroeder, the Hawkeyes wrestled and lost to one opponent that season: Nebraska. The next year, Iowa got its first dual win, over Iowa State. Soon later, in 1914, Oscar Hobbet became the Hawkeyes' first individual Big Ten champion. Iowa's first all-American and national champion came in the 1927–1928 season, with Leslie Beers achieving these honors. Beers wrestled at the 158-pound weight class.

Iowa's first Big Ten championship came in 1958, a year in which the Hawkeyes also had 10 dual wins for the first time. However, Iowa would not win another Big Ten title until 1974, under head coach Gary Kurdelmeier. Kurdelmeier led the Hawkeyes to their first national championship in 1975 and their second in 1976. Iowa lost only one dual match in those two seasons.

Following the 1976 national championship, Dan Gable took over as coach. The Hawkeyes finished third on the national level in Gable's first year, but with another national championship in 1978, Iowa began a streak that, at that time, was only matched by Yale's golf team and Southern California's track team. From 1978 through 1986, Iowa won nine consecutive national championships, a record which equals what Yale's golf team did from 1905 to 1913 and what Southern California's track team did from 1935 through 1943. In his career at Iowa, which lasted until 1997, Gable led the Hawkeyes to 15 national titles and 21 consecutive Big Ten championships. Gable's 355 dual wins at Iowa make him the university's all-time winningest wrestling coach.

Gable was replaced as coach by Jim Zalesky. Under Zalesky, the Hawkeyes won three straight national titles from 1998 to 2000 and placed ten individual national champions. However, Zalesky was fired following the 2005–2006 season, as the Hawkeyes began to fade on the national level. He was replaced by Tom Brands, who in 2008 led Iowa to its first team national title since 2000. Brent Metcalf and Mark Perry won individual national championships in 2008, with Perry becoming Iowa's 17th four-time all-American. Brands' Hawkeyes also won team NCAA championships in 2009, 2010 and 2021.

=== Women's sports ===
==== Basketball ====
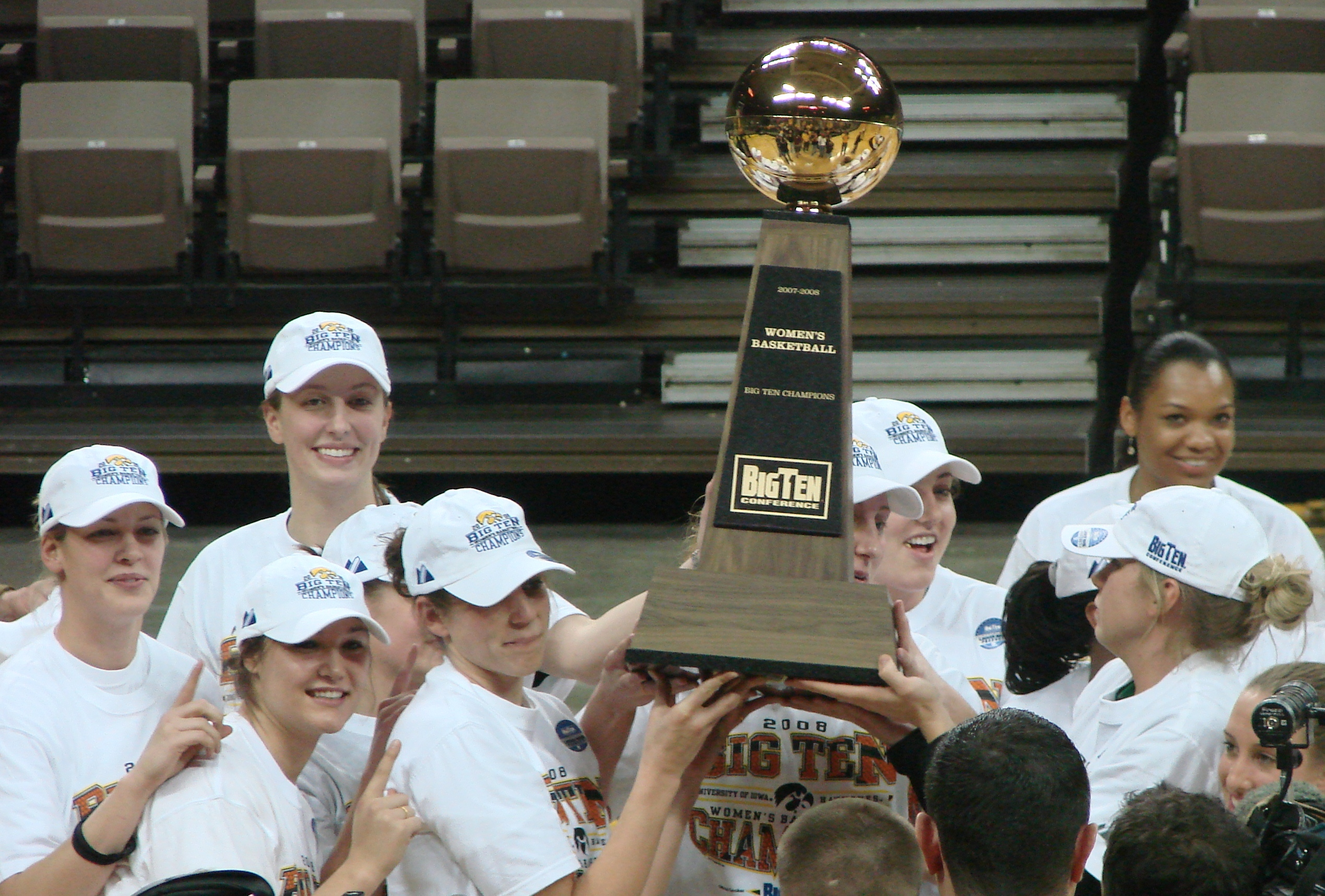
Members of Iowa's women's basketball team celebrate their 2008 regular season Big Ten championship on March 2, 2008.

Women's basketball at the University of Iowa began in 1974, under head coach Lark Birdsong. The Hawkeyes finished 5–16 that season, getting their first win over Big Ten rival, Minnesota. Birdsong would continue to coach Iowa until the 1978–1979 season, the first winning season in Iowa women's basketball history. Judy McMullen replaced Birdsong, and after coaching at Iowa for four seasons, McMullen was replaced by C. Vivian Stringer in 1983. Prior to her tenure at Iowa, Stringer coached at Cheyney University, and took the school to new heights when she led the Wolves to the national championship game in 1982.

Beginning with the 1983–1984 season, Stringer coached at Iowa for 12 seasons. In that time, the Hawkeyes won six Big Ten championships, played in nine NCAA tournaments, and reached the Final Four in 1993. Unprecedented attention was shown to the Hawkeyes under Stringer, as evidenced by the record-setting 22,157 fans that watched Iowa play Ohio State on February 3, 1985, in Carver–Hawkeye Arena. Stringer, however, left Iowa to coach at Rutgers in 1995, following the death of her husband Bill.

Angie Lee replaced Stringer, and led the Hawkeyes to a Big Ten championship in her first season. Under Lee, Iowa won another Big Ten title in 1998, but success began to wane soon thereafter. Lee's successor as head coach was Lisa Bluder, The Hawkeyes have won two regular season Big Ten championship and four Big Ten tournament championships, recently winning both titles in 2022 and the tournament championship in 2023 with a team led by superstar guard Caitlin Clark. In 2023, the team advanced to the Final Four in Dallas, TX as a #2 seed after defeating Southeastern Louisiana (#15), Georgia (#10), Colorado (#6), and Louisville (#5). Bluder retired after the 2023–24 season and was replaced by assistant Jan Jensen.

==== Rowing ====
Women's rowing became a varsity sport at the University of Iowa in 1994 at which time Mandi Kowal was hired as head coach. In 1997 and 1998 the Hawkeyes' varsity 4 (V4+) was invited to the NCAA Championships; 1997 marked the first NCAA rowing championships. The Hawkeyes made their first full-team appearance at the NCAA Championships in 2001. Following the introduction of the House v. NCAA settlement in 2025, the University of Iowa women's rowing programme, along with other Division I programmes subject to the settlement, is limited to a roster of 68 athletes.

In Fall 2009 a new boathouse was completed for the University of Iowa rowing programme. Prior to that time the rowing Hawkeyes had no permanent home, but instead their boats were housed in an excess area of the Iowa Advanced Technology Laboratories. The new P. Sue Beckwith, M.D. Boathouse is named after the benefactor, a former University of Iowa basketball letter-winner, who gave the seed money that made the boathouse possible. The boathouse is 20,000 square feet (1,900 m^{2}) and designed to withstand flooding. The building has workout facilities, team locker rooms, boat bays, indoor rowing tanks, and meeting spaces. On October 21, 2021, former Iowa Athletic Director Gary Barta named Jeff Garbutt as the fourth head coach in the history of the Iowa rowing program. Garbutt previously served as an assistant coach for the Hawkeyes from 2013 to 2020 and was the head coach of both the men's and women's rowing teams at La Salle University during the 2020–21 season. During his tenure as an assistant at Iowa, Garbutt helped guide the team, under head coach Andrew Carter, to three consecutive NCAA Championship appearances from 2017 to 2019. In 2018, the program reached its highest-ever national ranking, placing No. 7 in the Collegiate Rowing Coaches Association Poll. In May 2026 coach Jeff Garbutt's contract was extended through 2029.

The Hawkeyes competed internationally in 2024 at the Henley Royal Regatta in England. Iowa entered crews in the Princess Grace Challenge Cup for women's quadruple sculls and the Island Challenge Cup for women's eights. The eight lost to Edinburgh University B by 1 1/4 lengths. The quad lost to a composite crew from Twickenham Rowing Club and Trentham Boat Club by 4 1/4 lengths.

2024 also saw Hawkeye alumna Eve Stewart win a bronze medal representing Great Britain in the women's eight at the summer Olympics in Paris. This made her the first Iowa rower to compete at and win a medal at the Olympics.

==== Softball ====
The Hawkeye softball team has appeared in four Women's College World Series, in 1995, 1996, 1997, and 2001. The current head softball coach of the Hawkeyes is Renee Luers-Gillispie.

==== Swimming and diving ====
Nancilea Underwood (now Foster) was a diver on the United States Olympic Team in 2008 after completing her career diving for the University of Iowa. She was a 4-time US National Champion in individual and synchronized springboard events. She placed 8th on the 3 meter springboard at the 2008 Olympic Games in Beijing.

==== Wrestling ====
On September 23, 2021, Iowa announced that it would add women's wrestling for the 2023–24 school year. At the time, the NCAA did not hold a championship in that sport, but recognized it as part of the NCAA Emerging Sports for Women program. Iowa became the first power conference school to sponsor varsity women's wrestling. Women's wrestling graduated from the Emerging Sports program to official championship status effective in 2025–26. Iowa remains the only power conference school to sponsor women's wrestling, and is one of only seven Division I members with a varsity program.

==== Soccer ====
The program made its first NCAA Tournament appearance in 2013 and has since qualified in 2019, 2020, 2023, and 2024. Under head coach Dave DiIanni, Iowa won Big Ten Tournament titles in 2020 and 2023 and reached the Sweet Sixteen for the first time in 2024.

==== Field hockey ====
The program was founded in 1977 by Christine H.B. Grant, who established the team, served as Iowa's first women's athletics director (1973–2000), and was a national advocate for Title IX—testifying in court, serving as a federal consultant, and shaping gender equity policy. The team captured the NCAA Championship in 1986, the first Midwestern program to do so, and has made numerous Final Four appearances. Their home field was renamed Dr. Christine H.B. Grant Field in her honor in 1991 and rededicated after renovations in 2006. The Hawkeyes have won 16 conference titles (13 regular‑season, 6 tournament) and made numerous NCAA Tournament and Final Four appearances. Coached by Lisa Cellucci since 2014, Iowa has earned Big Ten Coach of the Year honors three years in a row (2019–21) and reached the NCAA semifinals in 2020.

==== Spirit Squad ====
The University of Iowa Spirit Squad consists of the Dance Team, Cheer Team, and the university mascot, Herky. The group includes over 50 members who perform at Iowa athletic events and participate in community outreach. The Iowa Dance Team also competes nationally at the Universal Dance Association (UDA) College Nationals. The team's highest placement at the competition is third place, achieved in both 2017 and 2020. As of 2024, the program has recorded 11 consecutive years of Top 10 finishes at UDA Nationals. In 2022, Nathan Polancyak became the first male member of the University of Iowa Dance Team.

== Notable non-varsity sports ==
=== Ultimate ===
The Iowa Hawkeye Ultimate Club (IHUC) competes in the West Plains conference of the North Central Region. In 2010, the team tied for 9th at college nationals, while taking 3rd place in 2011.

The Iowa Women's Ultimate team, Saucy Nancy, has also been very successful in years past. In 2011 the team tied for 5th at the College Championship in Boulder, Colorado. In 2012, they accomplished the same feat, tying for 5th again in Boulder, Colorado. Then in 2013, Saucy made it back into the College Championship in Madison, Wisconsin, and this time tied for 3rd.

=== Rugby ===
The University of Iowa Rugby Football Club plays college rugby in the Heart of America conference of D1AA Rugby. Iowa rugby has had some success in the past 20 years, finishing second at the 2014 Big Ten 7s tournament, and the 2015 Big Ten West 7s tournament. After coming close to achieving a Top 25 ranking in 2011, Iowa would be ranked as high as 17th in the nation after their final match of their 2014 season, and being ranked 20th in the final Canterbury D1A Poll of the 2014–15 season. Iowa would go on to make the USA Rugby 7s National Championships in back-to-back years, 2015 and 2016, moving on as runners-up in their group in 2015 before falling in the elimination round. In the 2023–24 season, the Hawkeyes fell to the Kansas Jayhawks in the post season, but won over Kansas State in their final playoff match. Most recently, Iowa took first in the Hawkeye Classic rugby Sevens tournament, with a notable victory over long-time rival and historically accomplished Iowa State team. Iowa plays its matches at the University of Iowa Rugby Fields on Hawkeye Park Road. Iowa is led by Head Coach Tyler Dailey.

== Pageantry ==
The University of Iowa borrowed its nickname from the state of Iowa years ago. The term "Hawkeye" originally appeared in the novel, The Last of the Mohicans, written by James Fenimore Cooper. In the book, the protagonist Natty Bumppo is given the word "Hawkeye" as a nickname from the Delaware Indians. Twelve years following the publishing of the book, the nickname was also given to people in the territory of Iowa (the state is now known as the Hawkeye State). Two men, Judge David Rorer and James G. Edwards, sought out to popularize the nickname, and were rewarded when territorial officials gave their approval.

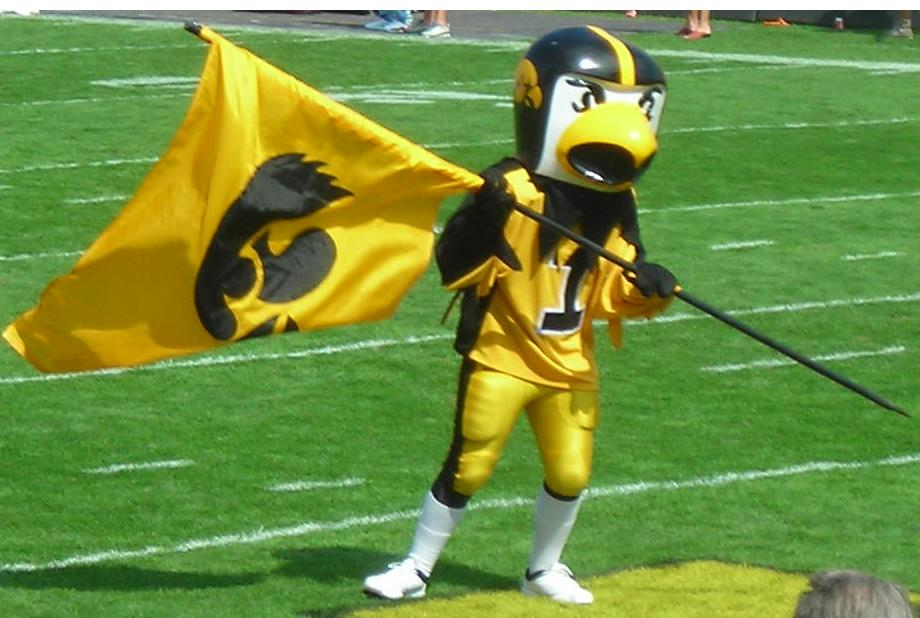
School mascot Herky the Hawk waves a flag at an Iowa football game on September 16, 2006.

The nickname gained a palpable symbol in 1948 when a cartoon character was created. Later named Herky, it was created by Richard Spencer III. The mascot was instantly popular among fans and gained its name through a statewide contest. A man named John Franklin suggested the Herky name. Since the mid-1950s, Herky has been a fixture at Iowa football games and has played a prominent role in all Iowa athletic events.

Iowa's primary school colors are black and old gold. The school's fight songs are "On Iowa!," the "Iowa Fight Song," and "Roll Along Iowa." A fourth song, the "Hawkeye Victory Polka," commonly referred to as "The Beer Song" or "In Heaven There Is No Beer," is played specifically following Iowa football and basketball victories. The school's alma mater is "Alma Mater, Iowa."

== Athletic directors ==
Iowa has had 12 athletic directors in its history. They are:

- Nelson Kellogg, 1910–1917
- Howard Jones, 1917–1924
- Paul Belting, 1924–1929
- Edward Lauer, 1929–1934
- Ossie Solem, 1934–1937
- E. G. Schroeder, 1937–1947
- Paul Brechler, 1947–1960
- Forest Evashevski, 1960–1970
- Bump Elliott, 1970–1990
- Christine Grant, 1973–2000 as women's athletic director
- Bob Bowlsby, 1990–2006
- Gary Barta, 2006–2023
- Beth Goetz, 2023-

== Championships ==
=== NCAA team championships ===
Iowa has won 26 NCAA team national championships.

- Men's (25)
  - Gymnastics (1): 1969
  - Wrestling (24): 1975, 1976, 1978, 1979, 1980, 1981, 1982, 1983, 1984, 1985, 1986, 1991, 1992, 1993, 1995, 1996, 1997, 1998, 1999, 2000, 2008, 2009, 2010, 2021
- Women's (1)
  - Field Hockey (1): 1986
- See also:
  - List of NCAA schools with the most NCAA Division I championships
  - Big Ten Conference NCAA national team championships

=== Other national team championships ===
Below are 13 national team titles that were not bestowed by the NCAA:

- Men's
  - Football (5 claimed): 1921, 1922, 1956, 1958, 1960
  - Rifle (5): 1911, 1918, 1929, 1940, 1946
- Women's
  - Track & Field (1): 1924
  - Wrestling (2): 2024, 2025

=== Big Ten Conference championships ===
The University of Iowa has 129 Big Ten Conference Championships

- Men
  - Basketball (11): 1923, 1926, 1945, 1955, 1956, 1968, 1970, 1979, 2001, 2006, 2022
  - Baseball (9): 1927, 1938, 1939, 1942, 1949, 1972, 1974, 1990, 2017
  - Cross country (2): 1961, 1966
  - Football (11): 1900, 1921, 1922, 1956, 1958, 1960, 1981, 1985, 1990, 2002, 2004
  - Golf (1): 1992
  - Gymnastics (8): 1937, 1967, 1968, 1972, 1974, 1986, 1998, 2019
  - Indoor track & field (5): 1926, 1929, 1963, 2021, 2022
  - Outdoor track & field (5): 1963, 1967, 2011, 2019, 2021
  - Swimming (3): 1936, 1981, 1982
  - Tennis (1): 1958
  - Wrestling (37): 1915, 1916, 1958, 1962, 1974, 1975, 1976, 1977, 1978, 1979, 1980, 1981, 1982, 1983, 1984, 1985, 1986, 1987, 1988, 1989, 1990, 1991, 1992, 1993, 1994, 1995, 1996, 1997, 1998, 2000, 2004, 2008, 2009, 2010, 2015, 2020, 2021
- Women
  - Basketball (15): 1987, 1988, 1989, 1990, 1992, 1993, 1996, 1997, 1998, 2001, 2008, 2019, 2022, 2023, 2024
  - Cross country (1): 1982
  - Field hockey (13): 1981, 1982, 1983, 1985, 1986, 1987, 1992, 1995, 1996, 1999, 2004, 2019, 2021
  - Golf (1): 1991
  - Softball (3): 1997, 2000, 2003
  - Soccer (2): 2021, 2023
  - Gymnastics (1): 2021
- See also:
  - List of Big Ten Conference national championships
  - List of NCAA schools with the most Division I national championships
