= Addario Lung Cancer Medical Institute =

US nonprofit organization

The Addario Lung Cancer Medical Institute (ALCMI) is a 501(c)(3) nonprofit organization dedicated to forwarding lung cancer research that can lead to new therapeutics, diagnostics, and a better understanding of lung cancer risk factors in families and in younger people, and resistance mechanisms. The institute is made up of an international consortium of 25 of the world's premier oncology research institutions, ALCMI partners with the top minds from the most medical facilities, providing financial support and access to a team of experts and staff to assist in launching and managing investigator-initiated clinical trials.

The organization was founded in 2008 by lung cancer survivor Bonnie J. Addario, founder of the Bonnie J. Addario Lung Cancer Foundation, which later merged with Lung Cancer Alliance to form GO2 for Lung Cancer, and her husband Tony Addario.

== Consortium partners ==
The ALCMI Consortium is a dedicated, international network of lung cancer clinical research physicians from the world's most recognized and prestigious oncology medical institutions. ALCMI partners include:

- Alvin J. Siteman Cancer Center
- Baptist Memorial Hospital-Memphis
- Boca Raton Regional Hospital
- City of Hope National Medical Center
- Dana–Farber Cancer Institute
- Dignity Health
- El Camino Health
- Harvard Medical School
- Institut Gustave Roussy
- Massachusetts General Hospital
- Montefiore Einstein Medical Center
- New York University Grossman School of Medicine
- Northside Hospital System
- Ohio State University
- Orange Coast Memorial Medical Center
- Palo Alto Medical Foundation
- Rush University Medical Center
- University of California, Davis
- University of California, San Diego
- University of California, San Francisco
- University of Manchester
- University of Turin
- University of Southern California
- Vanderbilt University Medical Center
- Washington University in St. Louis

== Publications ==
- "Germline EGFR Mutations and Familial Lung Cancer," published in the Journal of Clinical Oncology.
- "The Genomics of Young Lung Cancer: Comprehensive Tissue Genomic Analysis in Patients Under 40 With Lung Cancer," published in JTO Clinical and Research Reports.
- "SPACEWALK: A Remote Participation Study of ALK Resistance Leveraging Plasma Cell-Free DNA Genotyping," published in JTO Clinical and Research Reports.
