= Jill Costello =

American athlete and lung cancer awareness activist

- Nineteen-year-old Costello at a Cal Bears Football Game
- Born: Jillian Helene Weinkauf Costello; December 1, 1987; San Francisco, California, U.S.
- Died: June 24, 2010 (aged 22); San Francisco, California
- Occupations: Coxswain, activist
- Years active: 2002–2010
- Parent(s): Jim and Mary Costello

Jillian Helene Weinkauf Costello (December 1, 1987 – June 24, 2010), better known simply as Jill Costello, was an American athlete and activist for lung cancer awareness and research. She is best known for leading the California Golden Bears crew as varsity coxswain while fighting against stage IV lung cancer. Costello was an otherwise healthy, 21-year-old non-smoker, when she was diagnosed with cancer. In 2011 she was inducted into both the NCAA Hall of Fame and the UC Berkeley Golden Bears Hall of Fame.

== Personal life ==
Jill Costello was born in San Francisco, California to mother Mary Costello and father Jim Costello. She has two older brothers, Jimmy and Kevin. She attended high school at St. Ignatius College Preparatory and is an alumna of the University of California, Berkeley. She performed as a dancer with the San Francisco Ballet by the age of 9. During her year-long battle with cancer, Costello completed her degree in political economy of industrial societies with a 4.0 GPA, was the Cal Greek System's Panhellenic Vice President, was an active member of Kappa Kappa Gamma, raised hundreds of thousands of dollars for lung cancer research, and was an active member of Cal Bears women's varsity crew.

== Athletic career ==
At 5'4" and 110 pounds Costello started her athletic career as a coxswain with the St. Ignatius Crew. She continued her career with UC Berkeley's women's crew, where she was ultimately named Pacific-10 Conference (Pac-10) Athlete of the Year. Costello coxed the varsity 8+ to a fourth-place finish at the NCAA Championships in 2010 and a second-place finish overall. She also coxed the varsity 8+ for her first time during the 2010 season and she led the Bears to a victory over Stanford to clinch the Pac-10 Championships for Cal. That season she was second-team Pac-10 all-academic. In her junior year in 2009 she coxed Cal's first-place varsity 4+ at the Pac-10 Championships, which also took fourth at the NCAA Championships. As a sophomore in 2008, Costello coxed the varsity 4+ that placed fourth at the NCAA Championships and second at the Pac-10 Championships. She also earned Pac-10 All-Academic team honorable mention that year. In 2007, her freshman year she coxed the novice 8+ at the Pac-10 Championships.

== Diagnosis and fight against cancer ==
On June 6, 2009, Costello was diagnosed with Stage IV small cell lung cancer that had already spread to both lungs, her liver, breasts, ovaries, and bones. However widespread the cancer, she was physically fit, a nonsmoking, college athlete, and had only gone to the trainers office with slight pains in her abdomen days after coxing her boat to a second-place finish at NCAA. The gravely serious diagnosis she received from her initial stomach pain was shocking, and Costello's story spread quickly through her CaringBridge website. Altogether, Costello underwent 21 rounds of chemotherapy and 14 radiation treatments. Soon after her diagnosis, she was interviewed on National Public Radio and spoke against the negative stigma surrounding lung cancer as a "smoker's disease".

Costello spearheaded the first Jog for Jill on February 7, 2010, on the UC Berkeley Campus. The race drew over 1,000 participants and raised over $45,000 for lung cancer research. This was the largest fundraiser ever for lung cancer at the time.

In April 2010, Costello held "I like my hair, but I LOVE my lungs" parties and encouraged friends from around the country to cut off their ponytails and donate them to the Pantene Beautiful Lengths cause. Later that month, she made a pilgrimage to Lourdes, France in search of a miracle. She then spoke at Genentech, a cancer research company, about finding a cure for cancer that would save lives. She also participated in and was the cornerstone of the "Just like Jill" campaign. The cancer research campaign's main message is "Anyone Can Get Lung Cancer".

On June 20, 2010, four days before her death, Costello sent out a mass message on Facebook and her CaringBridge page from her hospital bed, inviting everyone she could to participate in the upcoming San Francisco BJALCF Walk in September in her honor. Her message was later used by the foundation to spread the word about the jog via YouTube and was the start of the entire Jog for Jill and Jill's Legacy movements.

== Activism ==
=== Jog for Jill ===
After Costello's death, BJALCF held their annual lung cancer walk/run in her honor. Jog for Jill SF was held on September 12, 2010, drew over 5,000 participants, and raised over $350,000. It broke the record previously set by February 2010's jog, and is currently the largest event held in support of lung cancer research. In Berkeley on February 6, 2011, the second annual Jog for Jill was again held on UC Berkeley campus and raised $98,000 for lung cancer research.

Jill's Legacy has taken charge of Jog for Jill, and is hosting the jogs on many more college campuses and cities every year. There has been a Jog for Jill at the University of Tulsa (September 18, 2011), Cornell University (September 25, 2011), University of Washington (October 2011), and UC Davis campuses. San Francisco, San Diego, Boston, and Orange County have also held the event.

=== Jill's Legacy ===
The Bonnie J. Addario a Breath Away from the Cure Foundation (BJALCF), a worldwide leader in efforts to eliminate lung cancer, announced on March 7, 2011, that it had launched a new advisory board made up of 21 young professionals who had each been personally affected by lung cancer. The board was named "Jill's Legacy" in memoriam of Costello. The group's mission is "to be the driving force in significantly increasing the stagnant 15.5% survival rate of the world’s number one cancer killer—Lung Cancer." The organization was nominated for a "Classy Award" in 2010.

Jill's Legacy's motto is "BEAT Lung Cancer Big Time!" All money raised through the group's fundraising campaigns goes directly to young researchers and lung cancer awareness movements. Jill's Legacy has participated in many fundraising efforts besides Jog for Jill, including attending the OMG Cancer Summit for young cancer patients and survivors. It was the official non-profit for the 2011 PAC-10 Rowing Championship and the National Collegiate Athletic Association Division 1 Rowing Championships, and was the sponsor for the Stotesbury Cup Regatta on Boathouse row in Philadelphia. Members of the group attended the International Association for the Study of Lung Cancer's July 2011 World Conference in Amsterdam. Jill's Legacy has held local events in San Francisco and the Bay area, including a benefit party before the Cal v. Stanford Big Game in 2011.

== Awards and honors ==
Cal Woman's Crew raced and won as "Team Jill" wearing special uniforms in honor of Costello at the "2010 Big Row" against rival Stanford. Stanford also raced in colors honoring Costello, who was unable to attend. Cal's team also wore their "Team Jill" uniforms as she coxed them during the NCAA Championships races that year. The Golden Bears dedicated that season to her, and the men's crew also raced their championship race in support of Costello. Costello received the Cal Pac-10 Athlete of the Year award in 2010. Before the races, she was a guest speaker at the 2010 Academic Honors Luncheon at UC Berkeley, where she received the Joseph McDonnell Kavanagh Award, an award given to Cal's Most Inspirational Student-Athlete. At the conclusion of the season, Costello, along with the rest of her crew, was honored by The San Francisco Giants during their 2010 World Series Championship Season. Her father Jim accepted on her behalf, wearing a "Team Jill" shirt. Rowers continued to show their support for Costello when her high school team the St. Ignatius' crew christened a varsity boat The Jill Costello. She had the honor of pouring champagne over the boat and coxing its rowers for its inaugural row. After her death, UC Berkeley Crew followed suit and also christened a boat in Costello's honor. Her silhouette is on its bow, and her cause, "Beat Lung Cancer!" is on its side. Following the tone set by the 2010 season, Berkeley held the "2011 Big Row" in memory of Costello, renaming it the "2011 Jill Row". Both Cal and Stanford men's and women's teams rowed in colors and with ribbons commemorating her life and legacy.

Costello was featured in Sports Illustrated Magazine's November 2010 issue in a story entitled "The Courage of Jill Costello" by Chris Ballard. This later won an award for "Most Outstanding Story" at the 13th Annual Luce Awards. She was also featured in NCAA's Champion Magazine in May 2011. On June 5, 2011 ESPN's Beyond the Game aired a special feature on Costello entitled "Wave and Wake" by Jeff Freeman, documenting her inspirational effect on the Cal Women's crew, especially during their 2010 season. Costello continues to be honored at Cal football games, and by other athletes who wear Jill's Legacy bracelets during games to show their support.

Costello is one of two winners of the NCAA Inspiration Award, who were recognized at the Honors Celebration at the 2012 NCAA Convention in Indianapolis.

Her supporters campaign each year for "Jill's Birthday Wish", a campaign she started to celebrate her 22nd and last birthday, by collecting donations for lung cancer each year on December 1.
