= Christine Grant (administrator) =

American athlete (1936–2021)

Christine Grant (27 May 1936 – 31 December 2021) was an American athlete, coach, administrator, and advocate for women's college athletics. Dr. Grant served as the athletic director at the University of Iowa from 1973 until 2000. She was inducted into the University of Iowa Athletics Hall of Fame in 2006. Grant was also inducted into the Women's Basketball Hall of Fame in 2017.

== Early life and education ==
Grant was born in Bo'ness, West Lothian, Scotland, on 27 May 1936, to Donald Annan Grant and wife Jean Orr. In 1956 Grant received her Diploma of Physical Education at Dunfermline College in Aberdeen, Aberdeenshire, Scotland. After graduating, she was a high school teacher and coach in Scotland (1956–1961), and field hockey coach and umpire at the high school, collegiate, national and international levels in British Columbia (1961–1964), Ottawa (1964–1965), and Toronto (1965–1971). Grant helped found the national field hockey team in 1962, becoming its first coach. Grant moved to Iowa City, Iowa, to pursue a bachelor's degree in physical education under professor M. Gladys Scott at the University of Iowa, which she received in 1969. She continued her graduate work, earning a master's degree in physical education in 1970, and a Ph.D. in physical education with an emphasis in administration in 1974.

While a student at UI, women had to pay out of their own pockets to compete on club teams and weren't allowed to play in the Field House. When Grant became coach of the women's golf club, the team couldn't practice on local courses without paying, instead practicing with whiffle balls on the grass near the Iowa Memorial Union. At the same time, the university began planning for a new recreation building that would open in 1970. When Grant learned that there were no women's restrooms or locker rooms in the initial designs—despite the project being funded by both men's and women's student fees—she pushed back. "I'm sure that that was the trigger that made me a feminist. That blew me away," Grant would later say.

== Athletic director ==
While still a doctoral student, Grant became the first women's athletic director at Iowa in 1973, a year after the passage of Title IX. The federal civil rights law mandated equal opportunity in education. At the time of the law's passage, the NCAA oversaw only men's competitions, and women's club teams Iowa didn't receive school funding or scholarships. Title IX, however, dictated that federally-funded educational institutions must provide fair and equal treatment to all sexes, including in athletics. With the support of progressive UI president Willard “Sandy” Boyd and alongside men's athletic director Bump Elliott, Grant started Hawkeye women's sports programs under NCAA supervision. She held the post until her retirement in 2000. After her retirement, Iowa merged its men's and women's athletic departments.

Working with a budget of $3,000 in her first year, Grant elevated 11 women's sports to varsity status by the 1974–75 season. Her duties included everything from hiring staff to chalking fields. The women's athletic department was housed in Halsey Hall, the longtime home of the women's physical education department and gymnasium. A portion of the building's kitchen was converted into a makeshift office for Grant. The university increased the women's athletics budget to $70,000 and in 1975, women's in-state athletes received 27 scholarships, increasing to 60 for 1976, and 80 for 1978, when out-of-state women were given scholarships. Each year under Grant's direction, the University of Iowa increased its women's athletics budget, as it worked as a partner to the men's athletic department. Under Dr. Grant's direction, Iowa's athletics department eventually grew to include 12 NCAA sports that won a combined 27 Big Ten Conference titles.

In 1983, Grant hired C. Vivian Stringer as the first Black women's basketball coach in Big Ten history. In her first season, Stringer improved the Hawkeyes' record to 11–7 in the Big Ten. On 3 Feb. 1985, Iowa more than doubled the national record for single-game women's basketball attendance as 22,157 fans crowded into Carver-Hawkeye Arena. Stringer would win the Naismith College Coach of the Year in 1993 and eventually be inducted into the Naismith Memorial Basketball Hall of Fame.

The Iowa field hockey program became a national power under Dr. Grant, a former field hockey coach. Under coaches Judith Davidson, Beth Beglin, Tracey Griesbaum, and Lisa Cellucci, the Hawkeyes have won 16 conference championships (13 in the Big Ten), six Big Ten tournament titles, and the 1986 NCAA Championship, making it the first Midwestern university to win a national title.

Dr. Grant also hired Gayle Blevins as the Iowa softball coach in 1988. Coaching until 2010, Blevins compiled 1,245 wins in 31 years as a head coach, ranking second all-time in NCAA Division I softball coaching victories.

Throughout her career, Grant was honored by NACWAA, the Women's Basketball Coaches Association, the Women's Sports Foundation and the National Association for Girls and Women in Sport. Grant also served as associate professor within the Department of Physical Education for Women (1973–2006).

== Advocacy and Historical Significance ==
While working as the athletic director at Iowa, Dr. Grant continued her strong advocacy for gender equity in athletics. She testified before Congress several times as a leading national expert, and served as a consultant for the Health, Education and Welfare Office for Civil Rights Title IX Task Force, travelling to Washington, DC weekly. That task force recommended guidelines and advocated for equal representation and treatment for all genders. She testified in numerous Title IX legal cases and gave hundreds of presentations that showed the status of gender equity in intercollegiate athletics. In 1984, the Supreme Court case Grove City College v. Bell ruled that as long as an athletics program received no federal financial support, it did not need to comply with Title IX as the amendment was written. Within a year, more than 90 discrimination cases were dropped by the Office of Civil Rights. Congress would overrule that decision with the Civil Rights Restoration Act of 1987, despite President Ronald Reagan's veto.

Dr. Grant was a founding member of the Association of Intercollegiate Athletics for Women (AIAW) and served in a variety of leadership roles with that organization, including as its president. AIAW was engaged in a bitter struggle against the NCAA, which was fighting Title IX in the courts. After the NCAA took over administration of women's sports, she served on a number of NCAA committees, including the NCAA Special Committee to Review the NCAA Membership Structure from 1988 to 1990, the NCAA Special Committee on Assessing Interests of Female Student-Athletes from 1993 to 1994 and the NCAA Committee on Committees from 1993 to 1996.

She also has held several positions with the National Association of Collegiate Women Athletics Administrators (NACWAA), including the presidency from 1987 to 1989. Grant spoke and published widely and has held numerous leadership positions as an advocate of gender equity in sports. She received numerous awards and honors, including the prestigious Billie Jean King Award presented by the Women's Sports Foundation, three honorary doctorates, and induction into the University of Iowa Athletics Hall of Fame and the Iowa Women's Hall of Fame.

In 2007, Grant became the fourth recipient of the NCAA President's Gerald R. Ford Award. The Gerald R. Ford Award, named in recognition of former President Gerald Ford, honors individuals who have provided significant leadership as an advocate for intercollegiate athletics on a continuous basis over the course of his or her career. That same year she was named one of the 100 most influential sports educators in America by the Institute of International Sport. Iowa's field hockey field was renamed Dr. Christine H.B. Grant Field in 1991 and was rededicated in 2006. Christine Grant Elementary School, named in her honor, opened in North Liberty, Iowa, in 2019.

== Personal life and death ==
Grant died on 31 December 2021, at the age of 85.

== See also ==
- Title IX
- Women's Basketball Hall of Fame
