= 2022 University of Virginia shooting =

Mass shooting in Virginia, U.S.

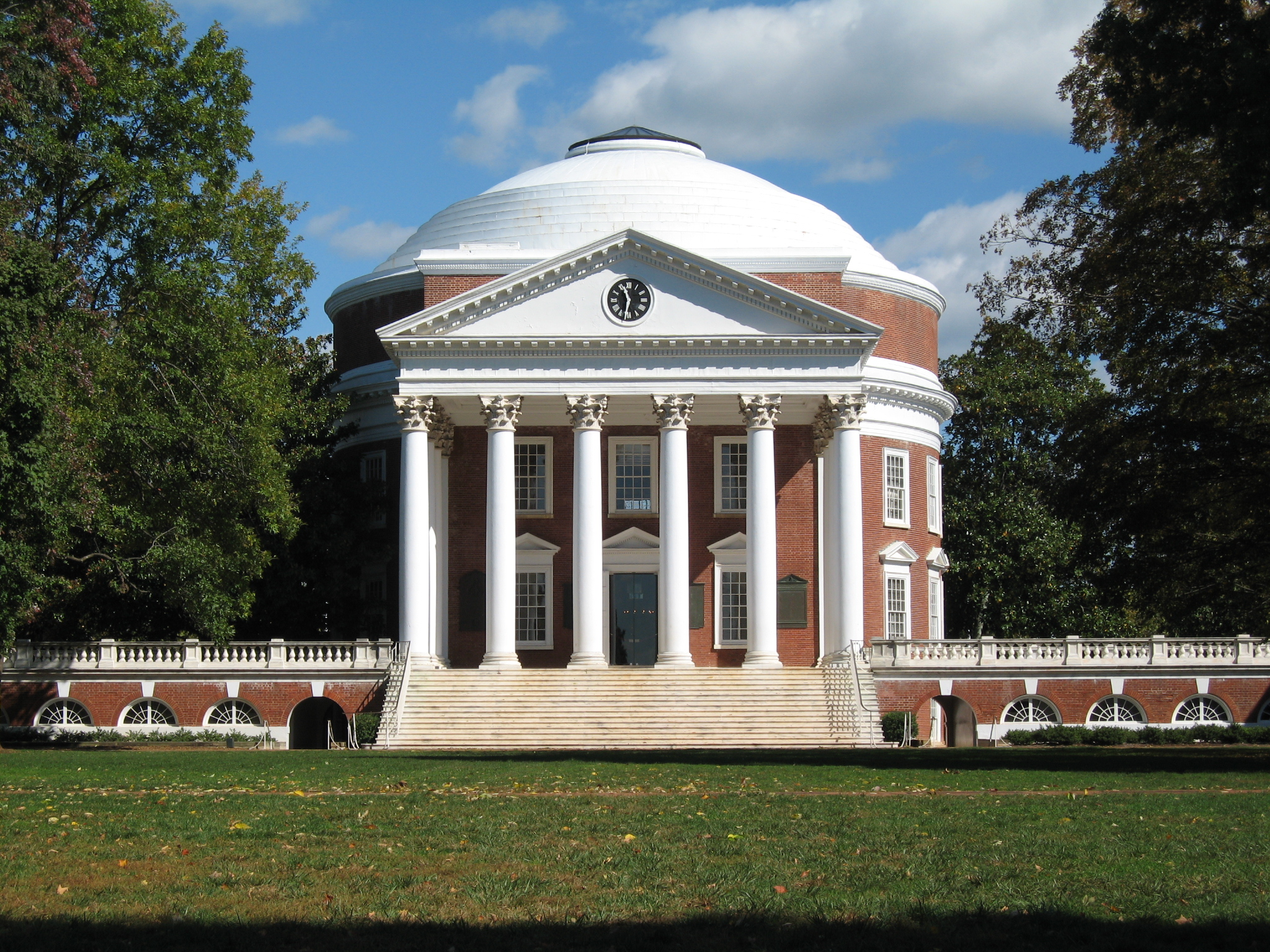
- Location: 38°02′23.2″N 78°30′12.8″W; University of Virginia, Charlottesville, Virginia, U.S.
- Date: November 13, 2022; 3 years ago c. 10:15 p.m. (EST)
- Target: UVA football players and another student
- Attack type: School shooting, mass shooting
- Weapons: 9mm Glock 45 semi-automatic handgun; .223-caliber Ruger AR-556 semi-automatic rifle (unused); 9mm Smith & Wesson Model 39 semi-automatic handgun (unused)
- Deaths: 3
- Injuries: 2
- Perpetrator: Christopher Darnell Jones Jr.
- Charges: Second-degree murder (3 counts); Using a handgun in the commission of a felony (3 counts)
- Verdict: Five life sentences + 23 years

On the night of November 13, 2022, a mass shooting took place at the University of Virginia (UVA) in Charlottesville, Virginia, in which three people were killed and two others were injured. Four of the victims, including the three who died, were members of the UVA football team. The perpetrator, 22-year-old Christopher Darnell Jones Jr., was later taken into custody and charged with three counts of second-degree murder, as well as three counts of using a handgun in the commission of a felony. Jones was sentenced to life in prison in November 2025.

== Shooting ==
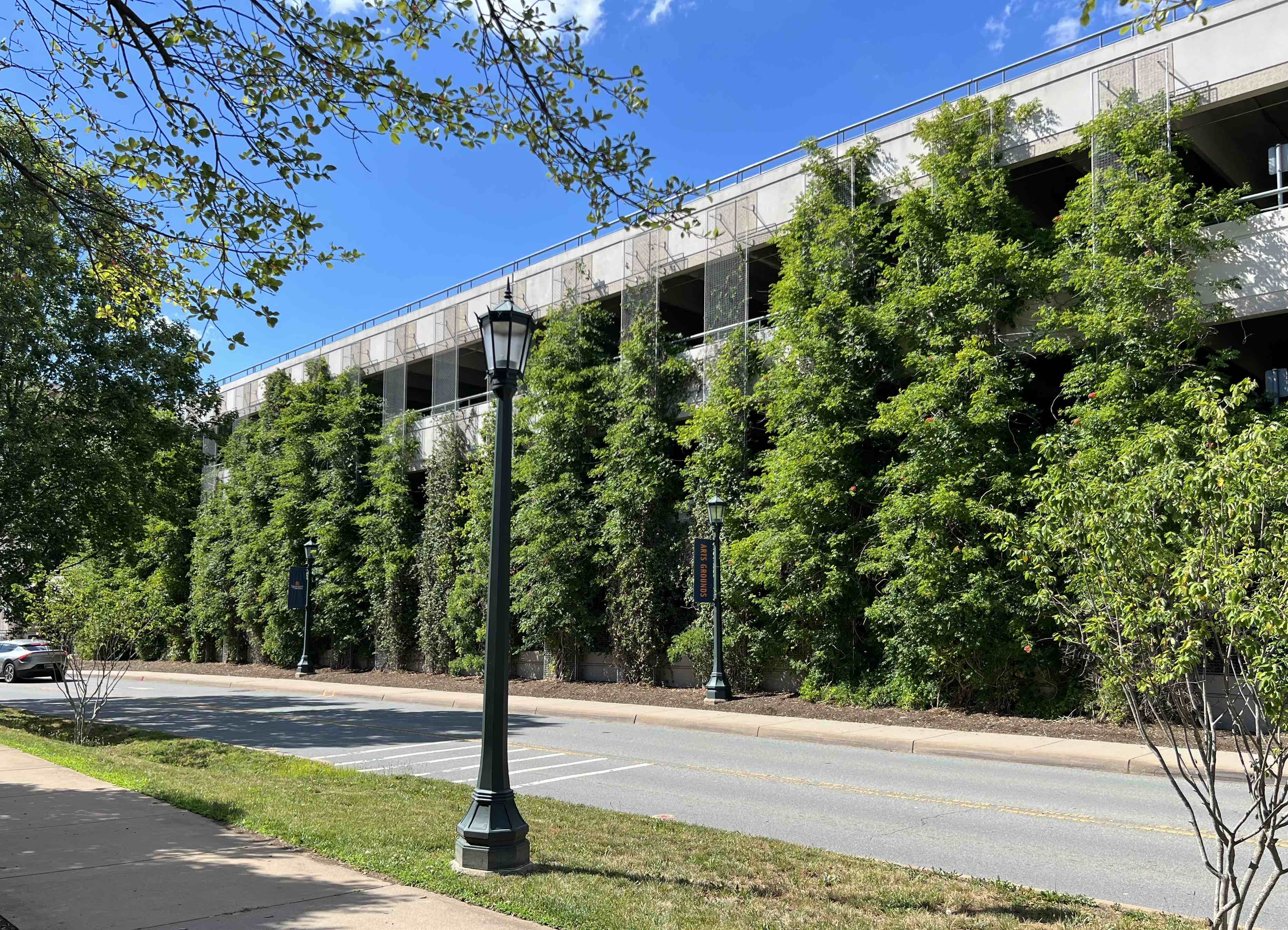
Culbreth Garage at the UVA; site of the shooting.

The perpetrator, Christopher Darnell Jones Jr., opened fire while on a chartered bus that had returned from a UVA class trip to Washington, D.C., to see a play about Emmett Till on November 13, 2022. While Jones was not a part of the class on African American playwrights, which included five UVA football players, he had been invited to join the trip as he was taking a social justice class taught by the same professor. Before arriving at Washington D.C., Jones sent several text messages to family members telling them that he loved them and that "something would happen today". On the way back, Jones sat alone and did not engage in most of the discussion with others. He sat in a seat just behind a female student and Lavel Davis Jr. A student also recalled him talking quietly to himself. About two hours before the shooting, Jones sent a series of text messages to an adult mentor. He told the individual to contact a criminal defense attorney. He also texted about how the group of football players were messing with him all day and hinted about the shooting.

Just before the shooting, Davis and Jones had a brief conversation about video games before Jones pulled out his Glock handgun. The first shots were heard at approximately 10:15 p.m. (EST) at a parking garage near the UVA drama building. All those involved in the shooting were on the bus. Some survivors said that they heard Jones yell, "Y'all been fucking with me all day" before he opened fire. The first people shot were Davis and the female student sitting next to him. Davis tried disarming Jones before collapsing from his injuries in the aisle. Jones then fired again at the back of his head. After shooting, Jones moved towards the back of the bus. He shot and killed D'Sean Perry after shoving a girl hiding next to him. He then shot and killed Devin Chandler, who was asleep while wearing noise-cancelling headphones. Just as Jones exited the bus, a male student, who had already escaped, returned to the bus to check for his friends. The student encountered Jones and tried running away before being shot in the back. Jones fled towards Scott Stadium to get to his car.

A survivor said that the shooting began as they were pulling up to the parking garage, and at first she thought it was a balloon or bag of chips popping, before she smelled smoke and gunpowder and dropped to the floor of the bus. During a lull in the shooting she saw Jones move down the aisle of the bus before leaving the bus, and the gunfire began again. Even during calls to evacuate the bus, some students attempted to give first aid and CPR to victims, before their professor evacuated them into the drama building, where several hid in a bathroom and called 911. Witnesses reported that the shooting appeared to be targeted, with Jones shooting one of the deceased victims who was asleep. The mother of one of the wounded told reporters that her son had reportedly evacuated from the bus with two students, but was wounded after returning to attempt to help his friends after realizing that no one else had evacuated.

At around 10:30 pm, Virginia Cavaliers head football coach Tony Elliott was called by an uninjured football player on the bus and notified of what happened, along with UVA police department support services bureau captain Mike Blakey, and both responded to the scene at the same time. Elliot and Blakey were quickly sent to the hospital before reaching the crime scene. As both of the injured were members of UVA sports teams, multiple other coaches and athletics administrators joined the two men at the hospital.

At around the same time, Jones unsuccessfully tried throwing his handgun onto the roof of a library building. He also took off his jacket and hoodie before leaving behind two Glock magazines and 16 rounds of 9mm ammunition.

A shelter in place warning was issued on Sunday night and was carried out until 10:33 a.m. Monday. While sheltering, students were sent the words "Run. Hide. Fight." through a cell phone alert system. The shelter in place was active for approximately 12 hours during a manhunt for the suspect. Multiple law enforcement agencies worked together during the manhunt.

Jones was spotted by a local officer who was on the lookout for a car matching that of the suspect. Jones was taken into custody at 11:24 a.m. on November 14 in Henrico County.

== Victims ==
The deceased victims were Devin Chandler, a third-year student from Huntersville, North Carolina; D'Sean Perry, a third-year student from Miami, Florida; and Lavel Davis Jr., a third-year student from Dorchester, South Carolina, all members of the UVA football team. All of the fatal victims had been shot in the head.

Two other UVA students were wounded and hospitalized in moderate condition, including Mike Hollins, another football player for the university.

== Aftermath ==
Classes for UVA students were canceled on Monday and Tuesday, with students returning to class on Wednesday but all work was non-graded for the rest of the week. Classes were also canceled for students in Charlottesville City Public Schools and Albemarle County Public Schools. A hotline was set up by the university for families and students, for any potential questions and information about the shooting. A vigil for the victims was held the day after the shooting, with candles placed around the Statue of Homer on campus with signs depicting the phrase "UVA Strong" and the uniform numbers of the deceased players; "1-15-41". A joint memorial service was held for the three deceased victims on November 19, with just over 9,000 people in attendance to celebrate the life of the victims. Celebrities attended and performed in the service, such as Bronco Mendenhall, ACC Commissioner Jim Phillips, past Cavalier players including Chris Long and Heath Miller, and gospel singer CeCe Winans. Before the service Elliot and the football team held a senior day to honor the victims and thirty-three additional senior players.

The Virginia Cavaliers men's basketball game scheduled for November 14 against Northern Iowa was later canceled due to the shooting. The home season finale of the Cavaliers football team against Coastal Carolina scheduled for November 19 and the regular season finale against Virginia Tech scheduled for November 26 were also canceled.

== Perpetrator ==
Christopher Darnell Jones Jr., aged 22, was identified as the perpetrator. Born on November 17, 1999 in Petersburg, Virginia, Jones attended eighth grade at John Rolfe Middle School. He spent his first three years of high school at Varina High School (where he played for the football team and was honorable mention all-conference as a freshman and second-team as a sophomore and junior) in Varina, Henrico County, Virginia. He then attended Petersburg High School for his senior year (where he was an honorable mention all-conference as a senior).

During his high school years he was named Student of the Year twice, and was a member of the National Honor Society and National Technical Honor Society, president of the Key Club, and president of the Jobs for Virginia Grads Program.

Jones is a former walk-on UVA football player. He was a member of the team for one season as a freshman in 2018, but did not play any games.

He had been investigated with regard to being the subject of alleged on-campus hazing in the past. Relatives of Jones said that he had been hazed while at UVA, and a source who knows Jones said that he had “been bullied” at UVA, “and it was bad.” That investigation was ended because witnesses would not cooperate.

Jones was under investigation in September 2022 over concerns that he owned a gun, after someone who does not attend or work for the university reported that Jones had made a comment about having a gun, though the person had never seen it. The UVA Office of Student Affairs reported the concerns to the multidisciplinary threat assessment team, and investigators had reached out to Jones. School officials also reached out to his roommate who stated they had never seen the weapon. Investigators had also learned of an incident involving a concealed weapon violation outside Charlottesville in February 2021.

== Legal proceedings ==
Jones was arrested and charged with three counts of second degree murder and three counts of using a handgun in the commission of a felony. State and federal prosecutors pledged support to the local law enforcement community in terms of investigating the incident and trying the suspect in the appropriate jurisdiction. Two days after the shooting, prosecutors additionally charged Jones with two counts of malicious wounding, each accompanied by the use of a firearm. Jones was denied bond during his first court appearance.

On November 20, 2024, Jones pleaded guilty in the shooting. His trial was set for January 22, 2025. He faced 13 charges — five counts of unlawful firearm use, six counts of aggravated murder, and two counts of malicious bodily injury. He was denied bail and is being held at the Albemarle-Charlottesville Regional Jail awaiting trial. On November 21, after a week-long hearing, Judge Cheryl Higgins sentenced Jones to five life sentences plus 23 years. Following his sentencing, Jones will be transferred to Red Onion State Prison to incarcerate his sentence.

== Responses ==
University of Virginia president Jim Ryan sent an email to students shortly after news of the shooting broke, stating he was heartbroken to report the shooting and deaths. University of Virginia head coach Tony Elliott issued a statement about 24 hours after the shooting, where he celebrated the three deceased victims' lives and strength of the team and staff, and aimed to provide resources for the team to process the deaths. US president Joe Biden and First Lady Jill Biden issued a joint statement about the shooting, which offered their condolences to the families of the victims, thanked first responders for their swift response, and condemned gun violence.

Virginia governor Glenn Youngkin tweeted condolences and made an additional statement at the Governor's Tourism Summit the same day asking for the attendees to join in prayer for the community. US House of Representatives member Jennifer Wexton (D, Virginia 10th) said in a tweet: "My heart breaks for those killed and injured, and for the entire UVA community which has been shaken by this horrific tragedy. These terrifying and senseless acts of violence must end. We need greater gun safety reform in our country."

Jones' father stated that he was in disbelief that his son was the suspected shooter, but alleged that his son had recently told him people were "picking on him" but he hadn't spoken to his son in about a month.

During the 2023 NFL draft, the three victims were named the honorary first draft picks for their favorite teams, and their families were presented with jerseys with their names on them.

Mike Hollins was awarded the 2025 NCAA Inspiration Award, an award which honors those who used perseverance, dedication, and determination to overcome a life-altering situation and become role models, giving hope and inspiration to others.

== See also ==
- John A. G. Davis, a University of Virginia School of Law professor who was fatally shot on the UVA campus in 1840
- List of school shootings in the United States by death toll
- List of mass shootings in the United States in 2022
