= Beth Goetz =

American soccer coach and athletics administrator

Current position
- Title: Athletic director
- Team: Iowa
- Conference: B1G

Biographical details
- Born: July 30, 1974 (age 52)
- Education: Brevard College; Clemson University; University of Missouri–St. Louis

Playing career
- 1992–1993: Brevard
- 1994–1995: Clemson

Coaching career (HC unless noted)
- 1996: UMSL
- 1997–2007: UMSL

Administrative career (AD unless noted)
- 2000–2008: UMSL (assistant AD)
- 2008–2013: Butler (associate AD)
- 2013–2015: Minnesota (deputy AD)
- 2015–2016: Minnesota (interim)
- 2016–2018: Connecticut (COO)
- 2018–2022: Ball State
- 2022–2023: Iowa (deputy AD/COO)
- 2023: Iowa (interim)
- 2024–present: Iowa

Head coaching record
- Overall: 120–90–9

Beth Goetz (born July 30, 1974) is an American college athletics administrator and a former college soccer player and coach. She has been the athletic director at the University of Iowa since 2024. Goetz joined the university as deputy athletic director and chief operating officer in 2022, was named interim athletic director in August 2023 after Gary Barta's retirement, and formally took the role in January 2024.

Goetz's previous roles include athletic director at Ball State University from 2018 to 2022, chief operating officer at the University of Connecticut from 2016 to 2018, deputy athletic director from 2013, then interim athletic director from 2015 to 2016 at the University of Minnesota, associate athletic director at Butler University from 2008 to 2013, and assistant athletic director at the University of Missouri–St. Louis from 2000 to 2008. She was also the head women's soccer coach at Missouri-St. Louis from 1997 to 2007, compiling a 120–90–9 record.

Goetz attended Brevard College and Clemson University as an undergraduate, playing soccer at both schools as a defender and midfielder. She received a master's degree from Missouri-St. Louis in 2000.

== Head coaching record ==
Record table
Season	Team	Overall	Conference	Standing	Postseason
UMSL Tritons (Great Lakes Valley Conference) (1997–2007)
1997	UMSL	10–9	3–6		
1998	UMSL	7–12	4–6		
1999	UMSL	7–12	5–6		
2000	UMSL	12–8–1	8–2–1		
2001	UMSL	13–5–1	7–2–1		
2002	UMSL	13–7–1	7–2–1		
2003	UMSL	13–6–1	6–3–1		
2004	UMSL	9–9–1	4–5–1		
2005	UMSL	12–8	8–5		
2006	UMSL	12–7–1	8–5		
2007	UMSL	12–7–3	7–5–1		
UMSL:		120–90–9	67–47–6		
Total:		120–90–9			
