= Brian Poole (American football) =

American football player (born 1992)

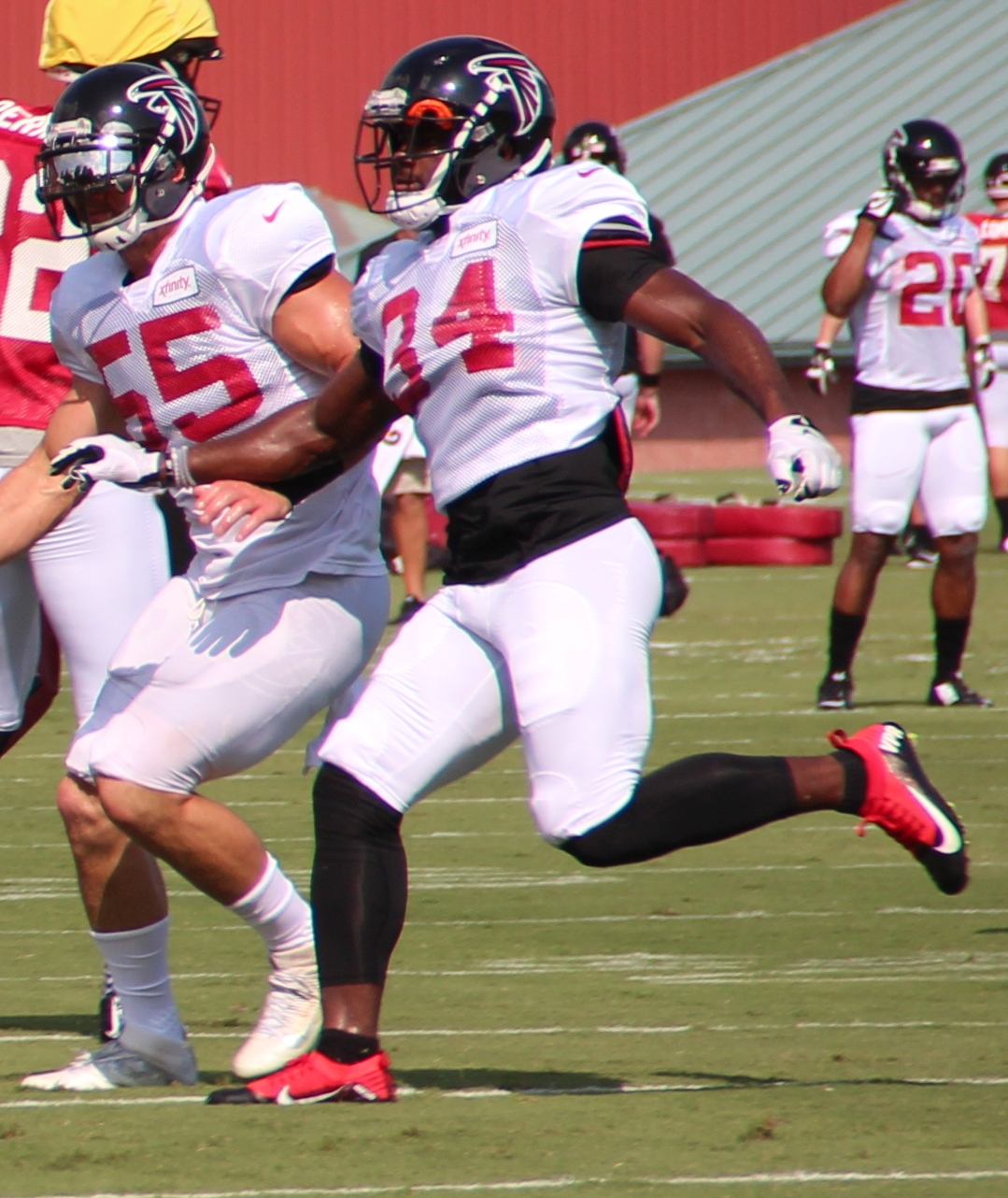
- Poole (No. 34) with the Atlanta Falcons in 2016

No. 34
- Position: Cornerback

Personal information
- Born: October 20, 1992 (age 34); Bradenton, Florida, U.S.
- Listed height: 5 ft 10 in (1.78 m)
- Listed weight: 213 lb (97 kg)

Career information
- High school: Southeast (Bradenton)
- College: Florida
- NFL draft: 2016: undrafted

Career history
- Atlanta Falcons (2016–2018); New York Jets (2019–2020); New Orleans Saints (2021); New England Patriots (2021)*; Indianapolis Colts (2021)
- * Offseason or practice squad member only

Career NFL statistics
- Total tackles: 299
- Sacks: 6
- Pass deflections: 31
- Interceptions: 7
- Forced fumbles: 1
- Fumble recoveries: 4
- Defensive touchdowns: 1
- Stats at Pro Football Reference

Brian Poole (born October 20, 1992) is an American former professional football player who was a cornerback in the National Football League (NFL). He played college football for the Florida Gators and signed with the Atlanta Falcons as an undrafted free agent in 2016.

== Early life ==
Poole attended Southeast High School in Bradenton, Florida and graduated in 2012. He played for the football team. He was recruited by the University of Florida, where he committed to play under new head coach Will Muschamp.

== College career ==
Poole played college football for the Gators from 2012 to 2015. In the 2012 season, he recorded three total tackles. In the 2013 season, he recorded 32 total tackles, two tackles-for-loss, two interceptions, and three passes defended. In the 2014 season, he recorded 45 total tackles, three tackles-for-loss, four interceptions, two forced fumbles, and one fumble recovery. In the 2015 season, he recorded 40 total tackles, 1.5 tackles-for-loss, .5 sacks, five forced fumbles, and one fumble recovery.

== Professional career ==
Pre-draft measurables
Height	Weight	Arm length	Hand span	40-yard dash	10-yard split	20-yard split	20-yard shuttle	Three-cone drill	Vertical jump	Broad jump
5 ft 9 5/8 in (1.77 m)	209 lb (95 kg)	31 in (0.79 m)	9 1/4 in (0.23 m)	4.50 s	1.54 s	2.57 s	4.43 s	7.14 s	29 in (0.74 m)	9 ft 4 in (2.84 m)
All values from Florida Gators Pro Day

=== Atlanta Falcons ===
On May 5, 2016, the Atlanta Falcons signed Poole as an undrafted free agent on a three-year, $1.62 million contract that includes a signing bonus of $3,500. Poole received offers from multiple teams, including the Los Angeles Rams, Pittsburgh Steelers, and Arizona Cardinals. He chose to sign with Atlanta Falcons due to his past relationship with head coach Dan Quinn, who recruited Poole to Florida and was his defensive coordinator there.

Throughout training camp, he competed for a roster spot against DeMarcus Van Dyke, Akeem King, C. J. Goodwin, David Mims, Devonte Johnson, and Jordan Sefon. He was named the third cornerback on the depth chart, behind Desmond Trufant and Robert Alford, and was also given nickel coverage duties.

He had his first career interception in Week 16 against the Carolina Panthers on quarterback Cam Newton. He played in all 16 games with nine starts as a rookie, recording 59 tackles, 10 passes defended, and one interception. In the postseason, he played in all three games, starting two, including Super Bowl LI, which the Falcons lost in overtime to the New England Patriots by a score of 34–28. In the Super Bowl, Poole had four total tackles.

In 2017, Poole played in 15 games with three starts as the Falcons' No. 3 cornerback, recording 63 tackles and four passes defended.

In 2018, Poole played in all 16 games with nine starts, he recorded career-highs in both interceptions and sacks, with three in both category.

=== New York Jets ===
On March 15, 2019, Poole signed a one-year, $3.5 million contract with the New York Jets. In week 12 against the Oakland Raiders, Poole recorded an interception off a pass thrown by Derek Carr and returned it for a 15 yard touchdown in the 34–3 win. In the 2019 season, he appeared in 14 games and started ten. He recorded 59 total tackles, one interception, five passes defensed, and one forced fumble.

On March 21, 2020, Poole re-signed with the Jets. He was placed on injured reserve on November 17, after suffering shoulder and knee injuries in Week 9. In the 2020 season, Poole appeared in nine games and started seven. He recorded one sack, 44 total tackles, two interceptions, and seven passes defended.

=== New Orleans Saints ===
On July 25, 2021, Poole signed a one-year contract with the New Orleans Saints. He was placed on injured reserve on August 24. Poole was released by New Orleans on October 12.

=== New England Patriots ===
On October 27, 2021, Poole was signed to the practice squad of the New England Patriots. He was released by the Patriots on November 9.

=== Indianapolis Colts ===
On November 22, 2021, Poole was signed to the Indianapolis Colts' practice squad.
