= Varina High School =

Public high school in Virginia, US

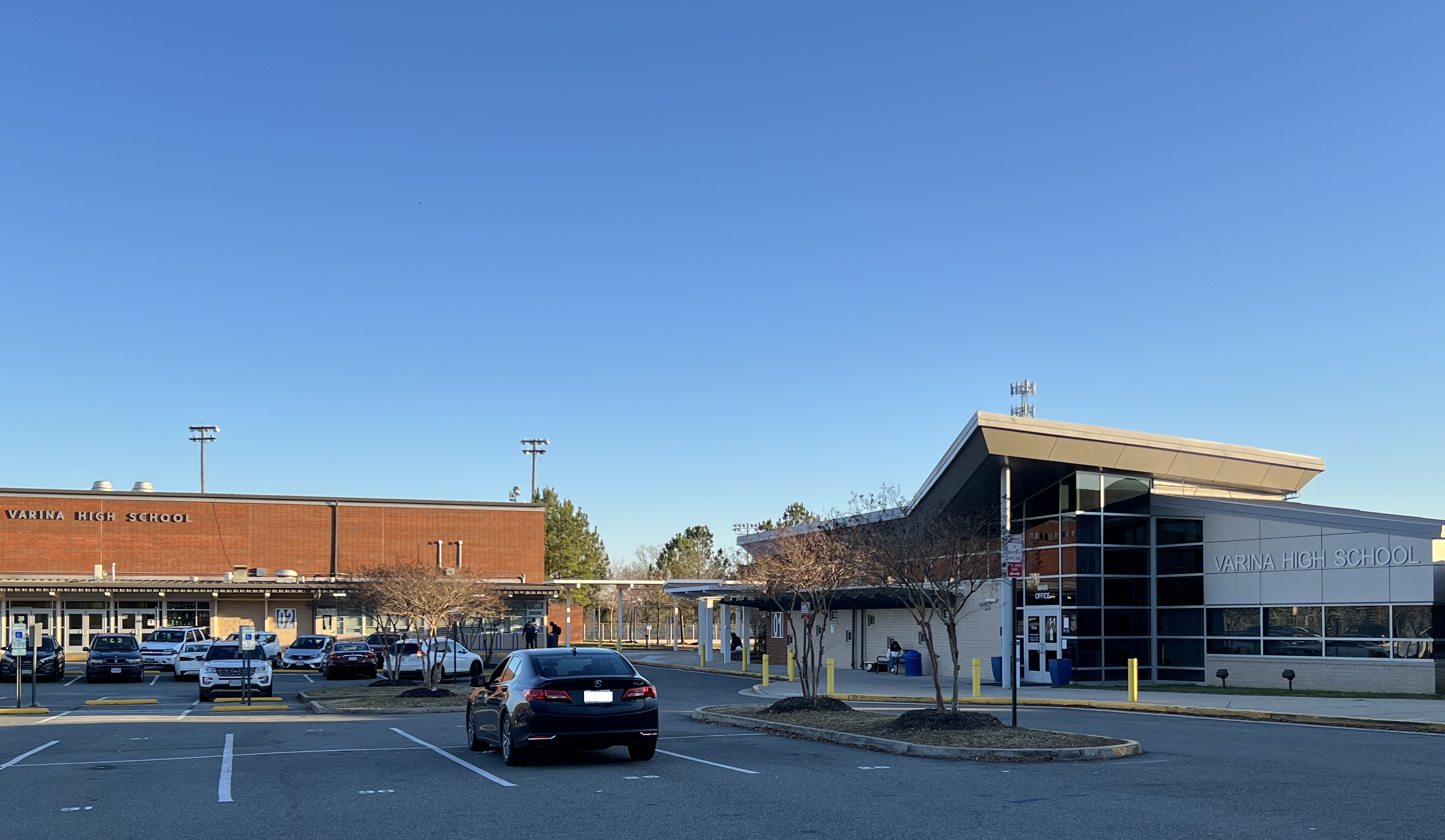

Location
- 7053 Messer Road; Henrico, Virginia 23231; United States
- 37°28′24.9″N 77°22′39.9″W

Information
- School type: Public, High school
- Motto: Learn Today Lead Tomorrow
- Founded: 1909
- Locale: Suburban, Large
- School district: Henrico County Public Schools
- NCES District ID: 5101890
- Superintendent: Amy Cashwell
- NCES School ID: 510189000835
- Principal: Cherita Sears
- Teaching staff: 103.00 (on an FTE basis)
- Grades: 9–12
- Enrollment: 1,420 (2024–25)
- Student to teacher ratio: 13.79
- Language: English
- Colors: Navy and Vegas gold
- Athletics conference: Virginia High School League (4A Capital District)
- Mascot: Blue Devils
- Rival: Highland Springs; Hermitage; Henrico
- Website: varinahs.henricoschools.us

Varina High School is located in eastern Henrico County, Virginia. It is one of nine high schools in Henrico County Public Schools and was founded in 1909, with the current campus opening in 1963. The school's mascot is the Blue Devil, branded after Duke Blue Devils, and competes in the Virginia High School League as part of the 4A Capital District.

== History ==
Varina School was founded in 1909, the second oldest consolidated school in Virginia, which is now home to Varina Elementary. In 1916, the high school became accredited under the leadership of principal George F. Baker. In 1920, it became the Varina Agricultural High School. The current school opened on the Messer Road campus in 1963. It housed grades seven through twelve until John Rolfe Middle School opened in 1979. In 2009, Varina High School began a three-year, $30-million renovation project of the facility and grounds.

== Notable alumni ==
- Andy Allanson, baseball player
- Andre Branch, football player
- Maurice Canady, football player
- Alan-Michael Cash, football player
- Tim Harris, football player
- Rick Langford, baseball player
- Jonathan Lewis, football player
- Michael Robinson, football player
- Ron C. Smith, football player
- Jailin Walker, football player
- Ken Willard, football player
- Christopher Darnell Jones Jr., perpetrator of the University of Virginia shooting
