= NCAA Gerald R. Ford Award =

The NCAA Gerald R. Ford Award was named in recognition of Gerald Ford, the 38th President of the United States as well as a University of Michigan football star. Presented by the National Collegiate Athletic Association (NCAA), the award honors an individual who has provided significant leadership in the role of advocate for intercollegiate athletics and has done so on a continuous basis over the course of their career. Ford played the position of center in football at the University of Michigan, participating on national championship teams in 1932 and 1933. He turned down offers from the Green Bay Packers and Detroit Lions to study law at Yale University. The Gerald Ford Award was first awarded in 2004.

== Recipients ==
The recipients of the award are:

- 2004: Theodore Hesburgh
- 2005: William C. Friday
- 2006: Birch Bayh & John Wooden
- 2007: Christine Grant
- 2008: James Frank
- 2009: Billie Jean King
- 2010: Myles Brand
- 2011: Joe Paterno (subsequently revoked)
- 2012: Pat Summitt
- 2013: Donna Lopiano
- 2014: James Andrews
- 2015: Walter Harrison
- 2016: Condoleezza Rice
- 2017: Grant Hill
- 2018: Robin Roberts
- 2019: Jackie Joyner-Kersee
- 2020: Dick Vitale
- 2021: David Robinson
- 2022: Ann Meyers Drysdale
- 2023: Jim Nantz
- 2024: Anita DeFrantz
- 2025: Gene Smith
- 2025: Charlene Curtis

In July 2012, following the Penn State child sex abuse scandal, the NCAA vacated the 2011 award given to Joe Paterno.

== See also ==
- NCAA Award of Valor
- NCAA Inspiration Award
- NCAA Sportsmanship Award
- NCAA Woman of the Year Award
- Silver Anniversary Awards (NCAA)
