= Alan-Michael Cash =

American gridiron football player (born 1987)

No. 92
- Position: Defensive tackle

Personal information
- Born: August 20, 1987 (age 39); Henrico County, Virginia, U.S.
- Listed height: 6 ft 2 in (1.88 m)
- Listed weight: 292 lb (132 kg)

Career information
- High school: Varina (Henrico, Virginia)
- College: NC State (2005–2009)

Career history
- 2010: Richmond Revolution
- 2011–2016: Montreal Alouettes
- 2017: Toronto Argonauts
- 2018: Edmonton Eskimos*
- * Offseason or practice squad member only

Awards and highlights
- CFL East All-Star (2014)

Career CFL statistics
- Tackles: 99
- Sacks: 11
- Interceptions: 2
- Fumble recoveries: 3
- Stats at CFL.ca

Alan-Michael Cash (born August 20, 1987) is an American former professional football defensive tackle who played in the Canadian Football League (CFL). He played college football at North Carolina State University and attended Varina High School in Richmond, Virginia. Cash was a member of the Richmond Revolution of the Indoor Football League (IFL) and the Montreal Alouettes, Toronto Argonauts, and Edmonton Eskimos of the CFL.

== Early life and college ==
Alan-Michael Cash was born on August 20, 1987, in Henrico County, Virginia. He attended Varina High School in Henrico, Virginia.

He redshirted for the NC State Wolfpack in 2005 and was a four-year letterman from 2006 to 2009. He recorded four solo tackles and four assisted tackles his redshirt freshman season in 2006. He totaled 21 solo tackles, 27 assisted tackles, 3.5 sacks, and one interception in 2007. In 2008, he accumulated 21 solo tackles, 17 assisted tackles, 3.5 sacks, one forced fumble, and two pass breakups. Cash recorded 24 solo tackles, 31 assisted tackles, two sacks, and one forced fumble as a senior in 2009.

== Professional career ==
Cash played for the Richmond Revolution of the IFL in 2010.

Cash was signed by the Montreal Alouettes of the CFL on May 26, 2011. He was released on June 5, 2011. Cash re-signed with the Alouettes on February 21, 2012. He signed an extension with the team on December 19, 2013. He was named a CFL East Division All-Star in 2014.

Cash signed with the Toronto Argonauts on March 23, 2017. He was released on May 1, 2018.

Cash was signed to the practice roster of the Edmonton Eskimos on July 3, 2018. He was released on July 6, and later re-signed to the practice roster on October 4. He was released on October 6, 2018.
