= Mike Hollins =

American football player

Current position
- Title: Graduate assistant
- Team: Virginia
- Conference: ACC

Biographical details
- Born: Baton Rouge, Louisiana, U.S.
- Education: University of Virginia

Playing career
- 2019–2023: Virginia
- Position: Running back

Coaching career (HC unless noted)
- 2024–present: Virginia (GA)

Accomplishments and honors

Awards
- NCAA Inspiration Award (2025); Brian Piccolo Award (2023)

Mike Hollins is an American football coach. He is a graduate assistant for the University of Virginia, a position he has held since 2024. He played college football as a running back for the Virginia Cavaliers.

== Early life ==
Hollins was born in San Diego, California and attended high school at University Lab. Hollins was rated as a three star prospect. Hollins would decide to commit to play college football at the University of Virginia.

== College career ==
In week two of the 2019 season, Hollins rushed for 78 yards and scored his first two career touchdowns, as he helped Virginia beat William & Mary. Hollins finished the 2019 season with 112 yards and three touchdowns on 21 carries, while also notching two tackles. Hollins decided to opt-out of the 2020 season due to the COVID-19 pandemic.

During the 2021 season, Hollins rushed for 213 yards and two touchdowns on 49 carries, while also making 16 receptions for 83 yards, and returning five kickoffs for 71 yards. During the 2022 season, Hollins rushed for 215 yards and two touchdowns on 64 carries and had 115 receiving years which included a career-long 64 yard reception in the Cavaliers' loss to Miami.

On November 13, 2022, Hollins and four others were shot on a chartered bus that had just returned from a class trip to Washington, D.C. Hollins and another student survived, but three teammates, Devin Chandler, D'Sean Perry, and Lavel Davis Jr, died. After four months of recovery, Hollins returned to practice for the Cavaliers. In the 2023 Virginia football spring game, Hollins scored a one-yard rushing touchdown, and after paid tribute to his former teammate by placing the ball on the name of D’Sean Perry, painted in the end zone alongside those of Lavel Davis Jr. and Devin Chandler.

In week eight of the 2023 season, Hollins rushed for 66 yards and three touchdowns, helping Virginia upset #10 North Carolina.

On November 27, 2023, the Atlantic Coast Conference awarded Hollins the Brian Piccolo Award for 2023. The award is given annually to the "most courageous" football player in the ACC in memory of Brian Piccolo.

== Coaching career ==
In 2024, Hollins joined the Virginia staff as a graduate assistant coach working with the offensive coaches.
