= NCAA Award of Valor =

Award in college athletics

The NCAA Award of Valor is presented by the National Collegiate Athletic Association (NCAA) to recognize "courageous action or noteworthy bravery" by persons involved with intercollegiate athletics.

Potential recipients of the Award of Valor are current intercollegiate athletics coaches or administrators and current or former varsity letter-winners at NCAA institutions who, when confronted with situations involving personal danger, acted with valor to avert or minimize potential disaster. Valor is described as "the strength of mind or spirit that enables a person to brave danger with boldness and firmness." Members of the armed forces and police forces may receive the award for duty-connected actions if their actions were "clearly above and beyond the call of duty."

The Award of Valor is presented during an award celebration at the NCAA's annual convention. It is not presented automatically on an annual basis. Selection is based on heroic action occurring in the previous academic year.

Notable recipients of the NCAA Award of Valor include:

- 1974 – Charles G. "Lefty" Driesell, men's basketball coach at the University of Maryland; in a fire that destroyed four townhouses, broke into a burning building and began evacuating children.
- 1982 – Timothy J. McCarthy. A former football player at University of Illinois, and then United States Secret Service agent wounded on March 30, 1981, during an assassination attempt on President Ronald Reagan. McCarthy stepped in front of President Reagan, saving the President from harm at considerable risk to his own life. He took a bullet to the abdomen but made a full recovery. The shooting occurred hours before the men's basketball national championship game between Indiana and North Carolina.
- 1984 – Joseph A. Delaney. A former All-American performer in football and track at Northwestern State University and budding star with the Kansas City Chiefs, Delaney died trying to save three children from drowning.
- 2004 – Jimmy Baxter, University of South Florida, saved two men trapped in a vehicle after a violent crash.
- 2008 – Emily Perez, 2005 graduate of the U.S. Military Academy, who died after an improvised explosive device exploded near her vehicle in Iraq and whose U.S. Army unit recognized her for her leadership after her death.
- 2008 – Douglas A. Zembiec, a 1995 graduate of the U.S. Naval Academy, who was a major in the U.S. Marines and had demonstrated heroism in several incidents before his death in Iraq.
- 2010 – Roxana Saberi, a freelance journalist on an alleged espionage charge in Iran. She repeatedly avowed her innocence. She was eventually freed and returned home to the United States, in January 2009. Roxana Saberi graduated from Concordia College Northwestern University and King's College, Cambridge University
- 2013 – Kirk Rohle, Hampden-Sydney College, saved his friend from a house fire. Despite being burned on 47% of his body, Rohle re-entered the burning house to find his friend, who had already escaped.
- 2014 – Cameron Lyle, University of New Hampshire, donated bone marrow to a stranger with leukemia, sacrificing his chance at a conference championship.
- 2015 – John Servati, University of Alabama, sacrificed his own life to save his girlfriend during an April 28 tornado that ravaged Tuscaloosa, Alabama.
- 2017 – Florent Groberg, University of Maryland, helped thwart a suicide bomber while serving in the U.S. Army in Afghanistan, saving the lives of 24 men.
- 2018 – Crystal Griner, Hood College, was one of two U.S. Capitol Police officers on site when a gunman opened fire at a June 14 Republican congressional baseball team practice in Alexandria, Virginia. Griner was shot in the ankle while protecting the lawmakers in attendance.
- 2021 – Jaimire Dutrieuille, Slippery Rock University, shielded 9-year-old girl from stray gunfire. Dutrieuille took three bullets in the process, but managed to live.
- 2025 – Ashley Harkins, Saint Michael's College, a Connecticut state trooper who risked her life to save a woman from falling 100 feet off a bridge.

== See also ==
- NCAA Inspiration Award
- NCAA Sportsmanship Award
- NCAA Woman of the Year Award
- NCAA Gerald R. Ford Award
- Silver Anniversary Awards (NCAA)
