= Southeast High School (Florida) =

Location
- 1200 37th Avenue East; Bradenton, Florida 34208; United States
- Coordinates: 27.4683737°N 82.5506524°W

Information
- Type: Public secondary
- Established: 1959
- School district: Manatee County School District
- Principal: Ginger Collins
- Teaching staff: 79 (FTE)
- Grades: 9 to 12
- Enrollment: 1,637 (2024-2025)
- Student to teacher ratio: 20.73
- Colors: Orange, Blue, Gray, and White
- Team name: Seminoles
- Rival: Manatee High School
- Yearbook: Arrowhead
- Website: www.manateeschools.net/o/southeast

Southeast High School is a public high school in Bradenton, Florida, United States, operated by the Manatee County School District and is the only public high school in Manatee County, Florida to offer the International Baccalaureate (IB) program.

== Admissions ==
Southeast High School is a public high school that takes in students from an area determined by the Manatee County School District. However, for admission into the IB program, applications are accepted through February of a student's eighth grade year. These applications consist of a short paragraph essay, all report cards from middle school and the students' most recent FSA scores in reading and mathematics. The application process is slightly different for students applying from Johnson Middle School, a local IB middle school.

== Awards and distinctions ==
For the school year 2010–2011, Southeast High School scored higher on the SAT than all other high schools in the Manatee County School District. In addition, for the same school year, it was named a 5-Star school by the Department of Education.

In 2012, the school was awarded a 'B' ranking by the Florida Department of Education, a full two grade levels above its previous ranking

The school has also been recognized by Newsweek magazine in its annual rankings of high schools in the United States for the year of 2007 and was ranked 330 in 2006, 497 in 2007, 356 in 2008, 277 in 2009 and 512 in 2010.

== Activities ==
Southeast High School has many after-school activities, which frequently earn top honors at the local, state, national and international levels.

=== Technology Student Association (TSA) ===
The Technology Student Association (TSA) at Southeast High School is one of the most respected programs in the nation. In 2010, a group of students in the Southeast TSA competed in a Formula One competition, winning first place in an international event in Singapore and subsequently won third place in 2011, setting a record for being a two-time top three finalist. The program has been awarded State and National grand champions on multiple occasions in the past several years. In 2018, Southeast TSA competed in the event TEAMS for their first time. They placed 1st overall in the state of Florida and won National trophy for Digital Media Production, a competition in which students were tasked in creating a promotional video as a mock sustainable consulting company. The team placed 4th overall in the nation.

=== SkillsUSA ===
The SkillsUSA program at Southeast High School is reigning national champions for the years 2010, 2011, 2012, 2014, 2015, 2016, and 2018 in the Broadcast New Category. This is due to the Southeast Television (SETV) program at the school.

== Notable alumni ==
NFL

- Danny Boyd, K, Jacksonville Jaguars
- Damin Copeland, WR, Jacksonville Jaguars
- Mike Jenkins, CB, 2008 Dallas Cowboys 1st Round Draft Pick
- Adrian McPherson, QB, New Orleans Saints
- Ahmad Miller, DT, New York Giants
- Brian Poole, CB, Atlanta Falcons
- Peter Warrick, WR, Cincinnati Bengals/Seattle Seahawks
- Todd Williams, OL, Tennessee Titans/Minnesota Vikings

MLB

- Joe Mays P, Minnesota Twins (2001 MLB All Star)/Kansas City Royals/Cincinnati Reds

NBA

- Clifford Rozier, Golden State Warriors

Politics

- Greg Steube, U.S. Representative of Florida's 17th congressional district.
