= Todd Williams (American football) =

American football player (1978–2014)

- Williams with the Tennessee Titans

No. 78
- Position: Offensive tackle

Personal information
- Born: April 9, 1978; Bradenton, Florida, U.S.
- Died: January 6, 2014 (aged 35); Manatee, Florida, U.S.
- Listed height: 6 ft 5 in (1.96 m)
- Listed weight: 325 lb (147 kg)

Career information
- High school: Southeast (Bradenton)
- College: Florida State
- NFL draft: 2003: 7th round, 225th overall pick

Career history
- Tennessee Titans (2003–2005); Tampa Bay Buccaneers (2006)*; Green Bay Packers (2006)*; San Jose SaberCats (2007); Grand Rapids Rampage (2007); California Redwoods (2009)
- * Offseason or practice squad member only

Awards and highlights
- NCAA Inspiration Award (2002); BCS national champion (1999)

Career NFL statistics
- Games played: 7
- Stats at Pro Football Reference

Todd Lamonte Williams (April 9, 1978 – January 6, 2014) was an American professional football player who was an offensive tackle in the National Football League (NFL). He was selected by the Tennessee Titans in the seventh round of the 2003 NFL draft. He played college football for the Florida State Seminoles.

Williams was also a member of the Tampa Bay Buccaneers, Green Bay Packers, San Jose SaberCats, Grand Rapids Rampage and California Redwoods.

== Early life ==
Williams was born in Bradenton, Florida and grew up in a poor area of Bradenton. His mother died before high school and his grandmother died when he was 14. This caused Williams to end up homeless, living in a car with a friend. Williams was later arrested for stealing a car.

Williams worked a variety of part-time jobs to support himself throughout high school, including cook, bagging groceries and paper delivery. He was not originally supposed to attend Southeast High School, which had one of the top football programs in the state, but a clerical redistricting mistake before his sophomore year caused him to attend Southeast High. He later joined the football team his senior year, earning second-team all-state honors. In the class of 1998, Williams was named the No. 5 offensive tackle in Florida by the Florida Times-Union. He was also rated the No. 27 overall prospect in Florida by the Tampa Tribune.

== College career ==
Williams played college football for the Florida State Seminoles from 1998 to 2002. He was redshirted in 1998. He was part of the Florida State team that won the national championship in 1999.

In 2002, he was one of three NCAA athletes who won the NCAA Inspiration Award. He graduated from Florida State with degrees in criminology and sociology. He was also a member of Phi Beta Sigma.

== Professional career ==
Williams was selected by the Tennessee Titans in the seventh round, with the 255th overall pick, of the 2003 NFL draft. He officially signed with the team on June 27, 2003. He played in six games for the Titans in 2004 and one game in 2005 before being waived on September 13, 2005.

Williams signed a reserve/future contract with the Tampa Bay Buccaneers on January 9, 2006. He was waived on July 25, 2006.

He was signed by the Green Bay Packers on July 31, 2006. He was waived on August 23, 2006.

Williams signed with the San Jose SaberCats of the Arena Football League on December 19, 2006. He played in six games for the SaberCats during the 2007 season. He was placed on the suspended list on April 16, 2007.

On May 2, 2007, Williams was traded to the Grand Rapids Rampage for future considerations. He appeared in seven games for the Rampage in 2007. He was waived on August 23, 2007.

Williams was signed by the California Redwoods of the United Football League on September 2, 2009. He appeared in six games, starting five, for the Redwoods in 2009.

== Death ==
On January 6, 2014, Williams was found dead at a hotel in Manatee, Florida. Williams's mother, Ozepher Fluker, became concerned when she had not heard from Williams, who had been suffering from stomach pain and ageusia. A county sheriff entered his residence and found Williams deceased. Williams had reportedly been living at the hotel for six years. At the time of his death, he was a teacher at Manatee Y Technological High School in Bradenton.

== See also ==
- List of Phi Beta Sigma members
