= Bonnie J. Addario Lung Cancer Foundation =

Non-profit organization in the U.S.

The Bonnie J. Addario a Breath Away from the Cure Foundation (ABAFTC), sometimes styled Bonnie J. Addario Lung Cancer Foundation (BJALCF), is a foundation created by Bonnie J. Addario in 2005 to eradicate lung cancer through research, early detection, education, prevention and treatment. It is made up of volunteers, people in the medical profession, and lung cancer survivors. The Foundation has three goals: 1) to raise public awareness about the relative lack of attention given to lung cancer in biomedical research, 2) to help lung cancer patients navigate the healthcare system to receive the best available care, and 3) to enlist the aid of physicians and biomedical scientists in transforming cancer research. The Foundation is based in San Carlos, California.

In 2019 the Foundation merged with the Lung Cancer Alliance to create a new organization known as the GO2 Foundation for Lung Cancer.

== Research funding ==
BJALCF provides funding for lung cancer research, early detection, education, prevention and treatment. The Foundation is one of the only private providers of lung cancer research and community outreach programs.

== History ==
The Foundation was founded by Bonnie J. Addario, a lung cancer survivor, on March 6, 2006, the same day Dana Reeve died from lung cancer. This Foundation was formed in response to the fact that lung cancer is under-funded and under-researched based on the amount of research dollars allocated per death. In 2005, the Center for Disease Control and Prevention (CDC) spent $204 million on breast and cervical cancer research. However, no money was allocated to lung cancer, the leading cause of cancer death in both men and women. The lack of funding, coupled with the complexity of the disease, has helped prevent lung cancer from making significant advances in its five-year survival rate. According to the American Cancer Society, the five-year survival rate has remained at approximately 15% since 1971. The Bonnie J. Addario Lung Cancer Foundation set out to change this seeming lack of progress by bringing lung cancer to national attention and establishing the Addario Lung Cancer Medical Institute (ALCMI), an international endeavor partnering academic institutions and community hospitals to advance treatment.

In 2019 the Foundation merged with the Lung Cancer Alliance to create a new organization known as the GO2 Foundation for Lung Cancer.

== Bonnie J. Addario ==
Bonnie J. Addario was the Founder and Chair of the BJALCF. Prior to starting the Foundation, she spent twenty years in the oil industry wherein she rose to a leadership role.
