= Lung Cancer Alliance =

Non-profit organization in the U.S.

Lung Cancer Alliance (LCA) was a U.S. national nonprofit organization, headquartered in Washington, D.C. Its stated purpose was to promote lung cancer awareness, reduce lung cancer mortality and end the stigma associated with lung cancer.

In 2019, LCA merged with the Bonnie J. Addario Lung Cancer Foundation to form the GO2 Foundation for Lung Cancer.

== History ==
Lung Cancer Alliance was founded in 1995 with to meet the needs of lung cancer patients and those at risk by improving outcomes, eliminating stigma and securing public health research funding.

In 2010 Lung Cancer Alliance began its first awareness program. Since then, Lung Cancer Alliance has developed many programs focused on lung cancer awareness: "Give a Scan", "National Shine a Light on Lung Cancer", and "Team Lung Love", have helped create awareness in the United States and internationally.

In February 2012, Lung Cancer Alliance took on its first major initiative, creating a national framework for lung cancer screening. In June 2012, it launched its national "No One Deserves To Die" campaign to help raise awareness and change the stigma associated with lung cancer. By the end of the campaign, more than 281 million impressions were made and market research proved a shift in sentiment around lung cancer.

== Chapters ==
Lung Cancer Alliance has local chapters in four states and communities. They have support groups in thirty-five states.

== Initiatives ==
=== National Framework for Lung Cancer Screening Excellence ===
In February 2012, LCA announced the launch of its National Framework for Lung Cancer Screening Excellence, which included a bill of rights for those most at risk of developing lung cancer and guiding principles for lung cancer screening sites.

Lung Cancer Alliance's National Framework states that the public has a right to know if they are at risk for lung cancer, advocates for the increased use of low dose CT screenings to detect lung cancer in its early stages and offers endorsements of medical facilities that are deemed by the organization to be Centers of Excellence.

=== Lung Cancer Mortality Reduction Act ===
In 2011, Lung Cancer Alliance supported the Lung Cancer Mortality Reduction Act, which authorized government research agencies with the Department of Health and Human Services, Department of Defense and Department of Veterans Affairs to develop a plan of action to coordinate prevention, early detection and treatment research for lung cancer. The bill aimed to reduce the mortality rate of lung cancer by 50 percent by 2020. On April 6, 2011, the bill died and was referred to Committee.

=== Proposition 29 ===
In June 2012, Lung Cancer Alliance's California Chapter endorsed Proposition 29, a ballot initiative to increase tobacco tax by one dollar to fund cancer research and tobacco prevention programs. It was closely defeated by California voters at the state-wide election.

=== Recalcitrant Cancer Research Act ===
On January 2, 2013, President Barack Obama signed the Recalcitrant Cancer Research Act of 2012 (H.R. 733) into law. This bill, which was included in the National Defense Authorization Act of 2013, requires the National Cancer Institute (NCI) to develop scientific frameworks for addressing cancers with survival rates of less than 50 percent. Within this act, lung cancer and pancreatic cancer were given priority status. The NCI framework must be submitted to the United States Congress within 18 months.
