= NCAA Inspiration Award =

The NCAA Inspiration Award is awarded to one of the following who is associated with the National Collegiate Athletic Association: a current or former varsity letter-winner, a coach, or an administrator. The award is given to an individual who "when confronted with a life-altering situation used perseverance, dedication and determination to overcome the event and now serves as a role model to give hope and inspiration to others in similar situations."

The Inspiration Award was first awarded in 2002. The recipients of the award are:

Year	Individual	Sport	College affiliation	Ref
2002	Maggie Maloy	Track & Cross country	Defiance College	
2002	Sam Paneno	Football	University of California, Davis	
2003	Diane Geppi-Aikens	Lacrosse	Loyola College in Maryland	
2003	Amanda Walton	Field hockey	Yale University	
2003	Todd Williams	Football	Florida State University	
2004	Heather Denison	Volleyball	University of Portland	
2004	Emily Miller	Soccer	University of Tennessee at Martin	
2004	Mike Nyeholt	Swimming	University of Southern California	
2005	Kaia Jergenson	Basketball	Lipscomb University	
2005	Michelle Thomas	Track and field	University of Oklahoma	
2005	Macharia Yuot	Track and field	Widener University	
2006	Raul Altreche	Lacrosse	Amherst College	
2006	John Doar	Basketball	Princeton University	
2006	Lois Taurman	Basketball, volleyball, & softball	Bellarmine University	
2007	David Denniston	Swimming	Auburn University	
2008	Jim MacLaren	Football	Yale University	
2009	Kelly Brush	Skiing	Middlebury College	
2010	Gregory Gadson	Football	West Point	
2010	2007 Bluffton University Baseball Team	Baseball	Bluffton University	
2011	Merzudin Ibric	Track and Field	Wheaton College	
2012	Jill Costello (Note: Posthumous award)	Rowing	University of California, Berkeley	
2012	Louis Zamperini	Track and field	University of Southern California	
2013	David Borden	Football	Kutztown University of Pennsylvania	
2014	Jason Church	Football	University of Wisconsin–La Crosse	
2015	April Holmes	Track	Norfolk State University	
2016	O. J. Brigance	Football	Rice University	
2016	Lauren Hill	Basketball	Mount St. Joseph University	
2017	Pete Frates	Baseball	Boston College	
2018	Jim Kelly	Football	University of Miami	
2019	Shaquem Griffin	Football	University of Central Florida	
2019	Maggie Nichols	Gymnastics	University of Oklahoma	
2020	Trey Moses	Basketball	Ball State University	
2020	Rocky Bleier	Football	Notre Dame	
2021	Chaunté Lowe	Track and Field	Georgia Tech	
2022	Bob Grant	Football	Wake Forest University	
2022	Steve Gleason	Football	Washington State University	
2023	Gracie Phelps	Basketball	Western Washington University	
2023	Black 14	Football	University of Wyoming	
2024	Esera Tuaolo	Football	Oregon State University	
2024	Roxanne Dunn	Track and Field	Slippery Rock University	
2025	Mike Hollins	Football	University of Virginia	
2026	Francesca Loiseau	Tennis	Marymount University	

== See also ==
- NCAA Award of Valor
- NCAA Sportsmanship Award
- NCAA Woman of the Year Award
- NCAA Gerald R. Ford Award
- Silver Anniversary Awards
