= Beckwith Boathouse =

The P. Sue Beckwith, MD, Boathouse at the University of Iowa

The P. Sue Beckwith, M.D., Boathouse is an athletic facility at the University of Iowa. The building primarily serves the university's women's rowing team. The university's club men's rowing team also uses the facility, along with the Hawkeye Community Rowing Program and the Old Capitol Rowing Club. It was a joint project of the City of Iowa City, the Athletics Department and Recreational Services of the University of Iowa. The project was designed by Iowa-based Neumann Monson Architects.

Groundbreaking took place on March 12, 2008. The P. Sue Beckwith, M.D., Boathouse was dedicated on September 18, 2009. The US$7.2 million facility includes training and meeting spaces, locker rooms, easy access to the Iowa River, rowing machines and a UI College of Engineering-designed indoor rowing tank. The boathouse is the first UI building designed to meet the standards for the U.S. Green Building Council's Leadership in Energy and Environmental Design certification (LEED). The Boathouse also achieved a LEED Gold certification. Its sustainability features include a geothermal heat pump system.

== P. Sue Beckwith ==
P. Sue Beckwith is an alumna of the University of Iowa. She obtained a bachelor of science in psychology in 1980 and completed her doctor of medicine degree in 1984. Following a fellowship in colon and rectal surgery at the Mayo Graduate School of Medicine in Rochester, Minnesota she returned to Des Moines to run a surgical practice. Beckwith when younger was a basketballer and began rowing later in life.

In 2004 Beckwith established three endowed scholarships in order to support women's rowing and basketball as well as a separate scholarship to honour Christine Grant.

The lack of rowing facilities for student athletes resulted in Beckwith pledging US$1 million towards the building of a new boathouse which was named in her honour.

In 2016 Beckwith established the P. Sue Beckwith, MD, Black and Gold Opportunity Fund. This fund provides annual financial support and additional opportunities for the University of Iowa women's athletic programmes. This funding can be used for initiatives that extend beyond the team's regular budgets. For example, the field hockey team used the funds for signage at their facility, while the rowing team used it to support a trip to compete at the Henley Royal Regatta in England.

In March 2021 Beckwith donated US$7 million to endow the head coaching position on the Iowa women's basketball team.

== Hawkeye Community Rowing Program ==
The programme is open to participants age 12 and over from Iowa City and surrounding areas, offering junior, recreational, novice and advanced rowing sessions. It also provides adaptive rowing for those with disabilities both physical and intellectual.
