= Iowa Memorial Union =

- Interactive map of the Iowa Memorial Union area

General information
- Type: Student Union
- Location: 125 North Madison Street Iowa City, IA 52242
- Coordinates: 41.663062°N 91.538268°W
- Current tenants: University of Iowa
- Construction started: 1924
- Completed: 1925 (Original Section)
- Owner: University of Iowa

Technical details
- Floor count: 4

The Iowa Memorial Union, or IMU, at University of Iowa opened in 1925, the building currently houses a number of student clubs and the Iowa House Hotel.

In 2008, the Iowa Memorial Union's basement was flooded. Recovery efforts have been underway

The hotel closed permanently on Feb. 10, 2025.

Referring to the student clubs previously mentioned, the IMU currently houses safe prayer rooms for Muslim students, and the Danforth Chapel is available for Christian worship.
