= Le'Veon Bell =

American football player (born 1992)

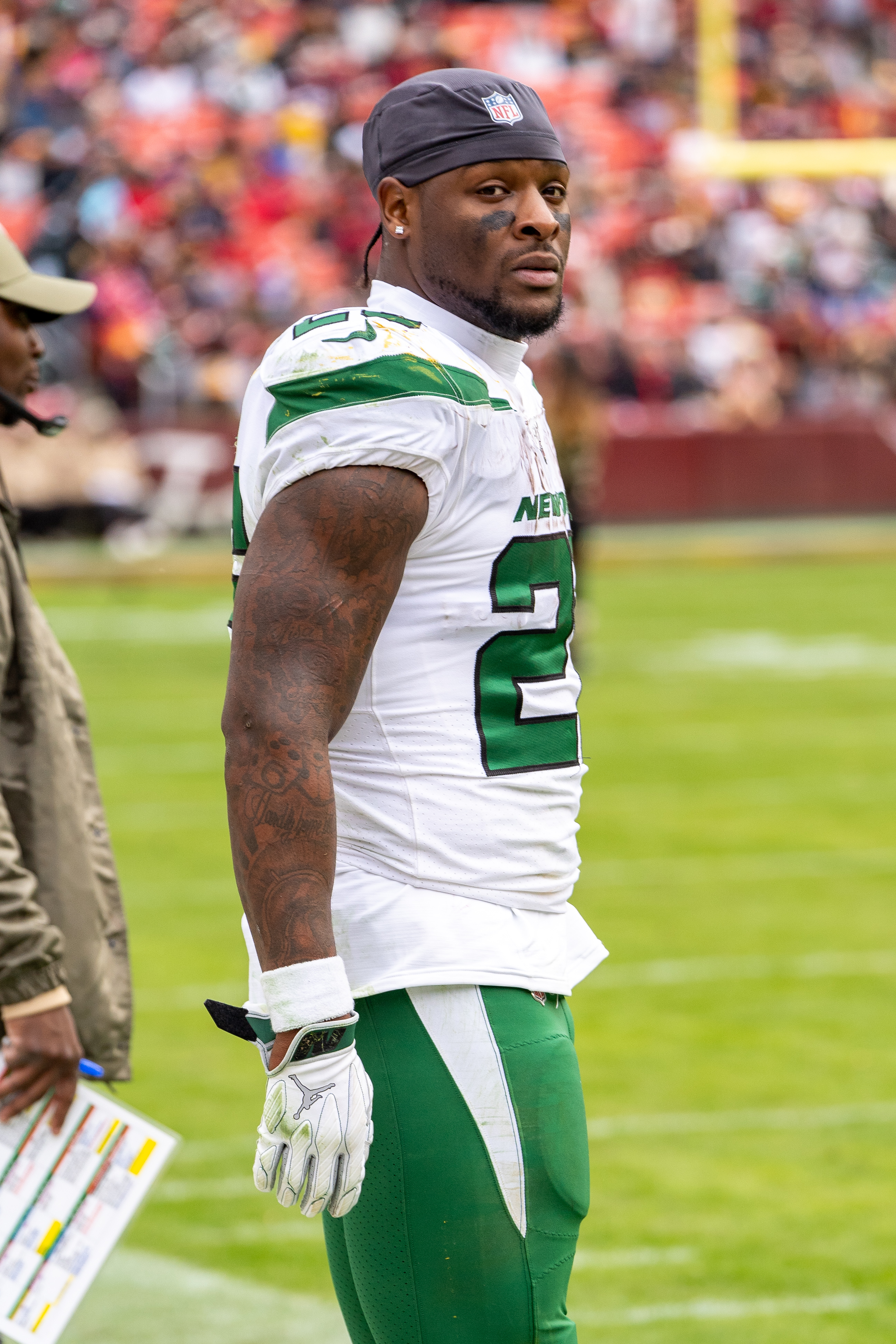
- Bell with the New York Jets in 2019

No. 26, 17, 6
- Position: Running back

Personal information
- Born: February 18, 1992 (age 34); Reynoldsburg, Ohio, U.S.
- Listed height: 6 ft 1 in (1.85 m)
- Listed weight: 225 lb (102 kg)

Career information
- High school: Groveport Madison (Groveport, Ohio)
- College: Michigan State (2010–2012)
- NFL draft: 2013: 2nd round, 48th overall pick

Career history
- Pittsburgh Steelers (2013–2018); New York Jets (2019–2020); Kansas City Chiefs (2020); Baltimore Ravens (2021); Tampa Bay Buccaneers (2021)

Awards and highlights
- 2× First-team All-Pro (2014, 2017 (Note: Selected as the flex)); 2× Second-team All-Pro (2016 (Note: Selected as the flex), 2017 (Note: Selected as a running back)); 3× Pro Bowl (2014, 2016, 2017); First-team All-American (2012); First-team All-Big Ten (2012)

Career NFL statistics
- Rushing yards: 6,554
- Rushing average: 4.1
- Rushing touchdowns: 42
- Receptions: 399
- Receiving yards: 3,289
- Receiving touchdowns: 9
- Stats at Pro Football Reference
- Boxing career
- Nickname: The Juice
- Height: 6 ft 2 in (188 cm)
- Weight class: Cruiserweight
- Stance: Orthodox

Boxing record
- Total fights: 3
- Wins: 2
- Losses: 1

Le'Veon Andrew Bell Sr. (/ˈleɪviɒn/ LAY-vee-on; born February 18, 1992) is an American professional boxer and former football running back. He played college football for the Michigan State Spartans and was selected by the Pittsburgh Steelers in the second round of the 2013 NFL draft. Bell also played for the New York Jets, Kansas City Chiefs, Baltimore Ravens, and Tampa Bay Buccaneers.

After rushing for 860 yards in his rookie season, Bell broke out in his second season with the Steelers, totaling over 2,200 combined yards and making the Pro Bowl. Bell missed several games in the 2015 and 2016 seasons due to drug-related suspensions and injuries, but still put up solid numbers and was voted to the NFL Top 100 both times. In 2017, he had a league-high 321 carries for 1,291 yards, as well as 85 receptions for 655 yards, and made the third Pro Bowl of his career. The following season, Bell refused to sign the franchise tag placed upon him by the Steelers, resulting in him sitting out the entire 2018 season. Bell signed with the Jets the following off-season, but never regained his former level of success, and following less than two seasons, Bell was released by the Jets. He then signed with the Chiefs, where he finished the 2020 season. Bell spent his last NFL season in 2021 with the Ravens and Buccaneers before pursuing a career in professional boxing in 2022.

== Early life ==
Bell was born on February 18, 1992, in Reynoldsburg, Ohio, later attending Groveport Madison High School in Groveport, Ohio, where he played football, basketball, and ran track. He played running back for the Groveport Cruisers football team. As a sophomore, Bell ran for 789 rushing yards and nine touchdowns. As a junior, he ran for 1,100 rushing yards and 13 touchdowns, and as a senior, Bell ran for 1,333 yards on 200 carries with 21 touchdowns. He was selected first-team All-Ohio Capital Conference Ohio Division as a senior. In basketball, Bell earned second-team All-OCC Ohio Division honors as a junior. He also participated in track & field while at Groveport, where he ran the 100 and 200-meter dashes and was one of the state's top performers in the high jump (personal-best of 6 feet and 8 inches or 2.03 meters).

Considered a two-star recruit by ESPN.com, Bell was listed as the No. 211 running back in the nation in 2010. Although he was a three-year starter in high school, Bell had limited scholarship offers from Bowling Green, Marshall, and Eastern Michigan, but he hoped to attend Ohio State. Bell's high school principal, Donis Toler Jr., believed he was under-recruited and reached out to Michigan State's head coach Mark Dantonio. Although Dantonio had heard of Bell, they had never scouted him personally or had thought of offering him a scholarship. With football season over, Dantonio sent his running back's coach to scout Bell at his high school basketball game. After he finished his senior football season, he finally received a scholarship offer from Michigan State after some players got into trouble and Michigan State had open scholarships available with a need at running back. In 2010, he graduated from high school early and began attending Michigan State that spring semester.

== College career ==
Bell enrolled in Michigan State University, where he played for the Michigan State Spartans football team from 2010 to 2012 under head coach Mark Dantonio.

=== 2010 season ===
Bell was an immediate contributor to the Spartans in their 11–2 campaign, which at the time was the most wins in a single season in school history. He made his collegiate debut in the Spartans' season opener against Western Michigan. In the 38–14 victory, Bell had 10 carries for 141 yards and two touchdowns. Two weeks later against Notre Dame, he recorded 17 carries for 114 yards and a touchdown in the 34–31 victory. On September 25 against Northern Colorado, Bell had 11 carries for 92 yards and three touchdowns in the 45–7 victory. Overall, he appeared in 13 games, rushing for 605 yards on 107 carries with eight rushing touchdowns. Bell also added 97 yards on 11 receptions and returned six kickoffs for 142 yards. In total, he had 844 all-purpose yards. Bell received All Big-Ten Freshman honors from ESPN.com and Rivals.com.

=== 2011 season ===
As a sophomore, Bell's role increased for the Spartans in their 11–3 season. He started the season with nine carries for 40 yards and two touchdowns in a 28–6 victory over Youngstown State. On September 24 against Central Michigan, Bell had eight carries for 81 yards and three touchdowns in the 45–7 victory. On November 5 against the Minnesota Golden Gophers, he had 165 all-purpose yards (96 rushing, 38 receiving, and 31 kickoff return yards) and two total touchdowns in the 31–24 victory. The following week against the Iowa Hawkeyes, he had 161 yards of total offense and a rushing touchdown in the 37–21 victory. During the Big Ten Championship Game against Wisconsin, he had 18 carries for 106 rushing yards and a touchdown in the 42–39 loss. Against #18 Georgia in the 2012 Outback Bowl, Bell rushed for 48 yards on 17 carries with two touchdowns and had five receptions for 39 yards in Michigan State's 33–30 double overtime victory. His second touchdown came very late in the fourth quarter and allowed the Spartans to force overtime. Bell led the Spartans in rushing with 948 yards on 182 carries and 13 touchdowns.

=== 2012 season ===
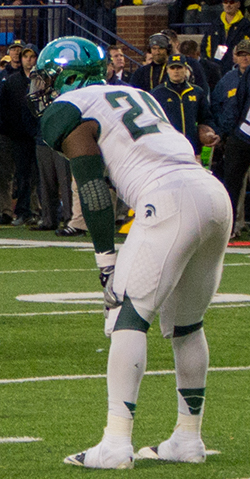
Bell in 2012

As a junior, Bell got a majority of the carries in the backfield for the Spartans in their 7–6 season. He started the season with 44 carries for 210 yards and two touchdowns to go along with six receptions for 55 yards in a 17–13 victory over Boise State. Against Eastern Michigan on September 22, Bell ran for a career-high 253 yards on 36 carries in the 23–7 victory to earn the Big Ten Offensive Player of the Week Award. Two weeks later against Indiana, he had 37 carries for 121 yards and two touchdowns in the 31–27 victory. The following week against Iowa, Bell had 29 carries for 140 yards and a touchdown in the 19–16 loss. On November 3 against Nebraska, he had 36 carries for 188 yards and two touchdowns in the 28–24 loss. Two weeks later against Northwestern, Bell had 32 carries for 133 yards in the 23–20 loss. On November 24 against Minnesota, he had 35 carries for 266 yards and a touchdown in the 26–10 victory. During the Buffalo Wild Wings Bowl against TCU, Bell had 32 carries for 145 yards and a touchdown in the 17–16 victory. He earned Offensive MVP honors for the bowl game.

Bell finished the season with 382 carries for 1,793 rushing yards, which was the second most in the Big Ten Conference, and 12 rushing touchdowns. His 1,793 rushing yards ranked second in school history for a single season, trailing only Lorenzo White's 2,066 rushing yards in the 1985 season. Bell was voted to the First-team All-Big Ten by the coaches and media, ESPN.com, College Football News, and Phil Steele. He won the George Alderton Award, which is given to the top male athlete at Michigan State.

After his junior season in 2012, Bell decided to forgo his senior season and entered the 2013 NFL draft.

== Professional career ==
=== Pre-draft ===
Coming out of Michigan State, Bell was projected by the majority of analysts to be a second or third round selection. He was ranked as the fifth best running back by NFLDraftScout.com and ranked the best overall running back by NFL analyst Bucky Brooks. Bell received an invitation to the NFL Combine and participated in all workouts and positional drills.

External videos
- Le'Veon Bell's NFL Combine Workout

Bell was satisfied with his combine performance and only performed positional drills at Michigan State's Pro Day. Bell, Dion Sims, William Gholston, Johnny Adams, and five other Michigan State prospects worked out in front of scouts and representatives from 29 NFL teams. The only head coach that attended was Pittsburgh Steelers' head coach Mike Tomlin. Scouts considered Bell a big bruising back with quick feet and lower body strength and also gave him positive reviews for his ability to run north–south, for his strong cuts, and nice bursts through holes. The only negative reviews were based on his limited ball-carrier vision, inconsistent blocking, and his height that would possibly affect his speed and ability to dodge tacklers.

Pre-draft measurables
Height	Weight	Arm length	Hand span	Wingspan	40-yard dash	10-yard split	20-yard split	20-yard shuttle	Three-cone drill	Vertical jump	Broad jump	Bench press	Wonderlic
6 ft 1 3/8 in (1.86 m)	230 lb (104 kg)	31 1/2 in (0.80 m)	9 5/8 in (0.24 m)	6 ft 2 3/4 in (1.90 m)	4.60 s	1.57 s	2.64 s	4.24 s	6.75 s	31 1/2 in (0.80 m)	9 ft 10 in (3.00 m)	24 reps	17
All values from NFL Combine

=== Pittsburgh Steelers ===
External videos
- Steelers draft Le'Veon Bell 48th overall
- NFL Draft Profile: Le'Veon Bell

==== 2013 season ====
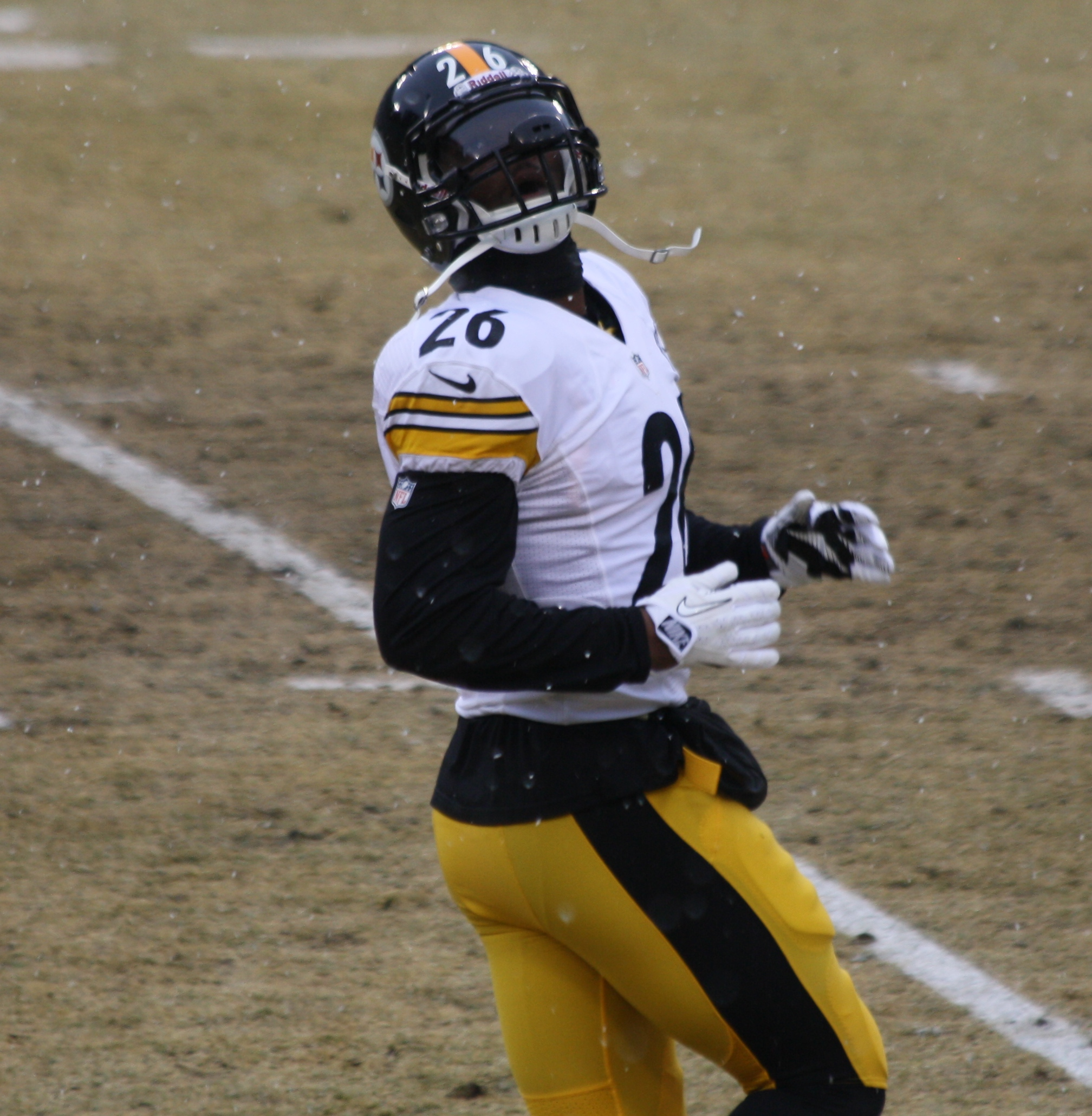
Bell in 2013

The Pittsburgh Steelers selected Bell in the second round with the 48th overall pick in the 2013 NFL Draft. He was the second running back to be selected that year, behind Giovani Bernard (37th overall, Bengals). On June 3, 2013, the Steelers signed Bell to a four-year, $4.12 million rookie contract that included $2.27 million guaranteed and a signing bonus of $1.37 million.

Bell entered training camp competing with veteran Isaac Redman for the Steelers' starting running back position. In his second preseason game against the Washington Redskins, Bell was tackled on a running play and suffered a mid-foot sprain. His injury did not require surgery, but forced Bell to miss the first three weeks of the regular season.

On September 29, Bell appeared in his first NFL game at Wembley Stadium in London and rushed for 57 yards on 16 carries and a season-high two touchdowns while also catching four passes for 27 yards in a 34–27 loss to the Minnesota Vikings. His first NFL touchdown came on an eight-yard run in the first quarter of the game. The Steelers chose to release Isaac Redman on October 21.

During Week 13 against the Baltimore Ravens on Thanksgiving, Bell had 16 carries for 73 yards and a season-long 43-yard touchdown, while also racking up a season-high seven receptions for 63 yards in the narrow 22–20 road loss. Three weeks later against the Green Bay Packers, Bell had a season-high 26 carries for 124 yards and a rushing touchdown during the 38–31 road victory. For his Week 16 performance, Bell earned the Joe Greene Great Performance Award and the Pepsi Next NFL Rookie of the Week nomination. In the regular-season finale against the Cleveland Browns, Bell broke Steelers legend Franco Harris's rookie record for total yards from scrimmage with 1,259 yards.

Bell finished his rookie season with 244 carries for 860 yards and eight touchdowns to go along with 45 receptions for 399 yards in 13 games and starts. Bell became the first rookie to lead the team in rushing since Tim Worley in 1989. Among rookies, Bell finished third in rushing yards and second in rushing touchdowns.

==== 2014 season ====
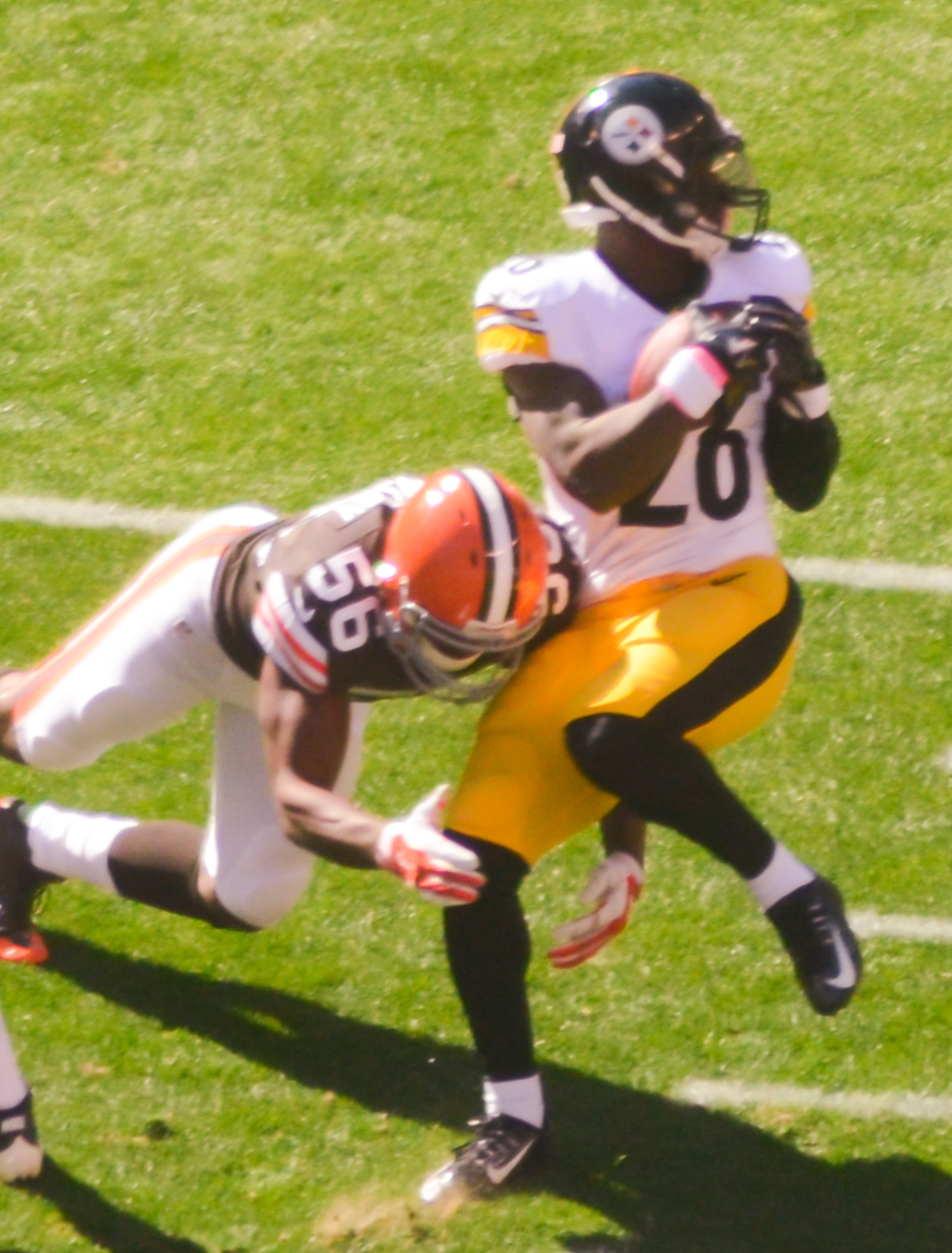
Bell in 2014

Bell began his second season as a starter in the season opener against the Cleveland Browns and finished the game with 21 carries for 109 yards and a touchdown to go along with six receptions for 88 yards during the 30–27 victory. Two weeks later, Bell and LeGarrette Blount both rushed for over 100 yards each against the Carolina Panthers. He finished the 37–19 road victory with 21 carries for 147 yards, including a career long 81-yard run. On October 20, Bell had eight catches for 88 yards and made his first NFL receiving touchdown in a 30–23 victory over the Houston Texans in Week 7. Bell became the first running back in Steelers' history to have seven consecutive games with 100 yards from scrimmage. He had his most productive rushing game of the season in Week 11 against the Tennessee Titans, gaining 204 rushing yards and a rushing touchdown on a season-high 33 carries in the 27–24 victory.

During Week 13 against the New Orleans Saints, Bell had a season-high eight receptions for 159 yards while also rushing 21 times for 95 yards and a touchdown in the 35–32 loss. He earned AFC Offensive Player of the Week honors for his performance against the Saints. The following week, Bell rushed 26 times for 185 yards and made six receptions for 50 yards while scoring three total touchdowns during a 42–21 victory over the Cincinnati Bengals in Week 14. Bell tied Walter Payton's NFL record of three consecutive games with at least 200 yards from scrimmage after his performance against the Bengals. During Week 15, he had 20 carries for 47 yards and two touchdowns to go along with five receptions for 72 yards in the 27–20 victory over the Atlanta Falcons. On December 28, Bell was injured against the Bengals in the regular season finale when he hyperextended his knee while being tackled by safety Reggie Nelson. Bell was ruled out against the Baltimore Ravens in the Wild Card Round of the 2014 playoffs.

Bell broke out in the 2014 season, going from rookie to All-Pro, finishing second in rushing yards, yards from scrimmage, and all-purpose yards to Cowboys running back DeMarco Murray. He led all running backs in receiving yards and yards per reception. He finished the season averaging 4.7 rushing yards per carry (YPC), up from 3.5 YPC in 2013. Bell finished his first complete regular season with a career-high 290 carries, 1,361 rushing yards, eight rushing touchdowns, 83 receptions, 854 receiving yards, and three receiving touchdowns. Bell's 2,215 yards from scrimmage set a new single season franchise record, breaking Barry Foster's 2,034 in 1992. He earned FedEx Ground Player of the Week twice, once in Week 3 and once in Week 11. In addition, he was named FedEx Ground Player of the Year. He finished fourth in AP Offensive Player of the Year Voting. He was named to the Pro Bowl and was ranked 16th by his fellow players on the NFL Top 100 Players of 2015.

==== 2015 season ====
After being arrested with then-teammate LeGarrette Blount on DUI and marijuana possession charges in August 2014, Bell was suspended by the NFL for the first four games of the 2015 regular season. On April 9, 2015, it was reported that the suspension was reduced to three games. On July 28, Bell's suspension was reduced from three games to two following a successful appeal.

Bell made his 2015 debut against the St. Louis Rams in Week 3 on September 27, 2015. He finished the game with 19 carries for 62 yards and scored his first rushing touchdown of the season, while also accounting for seven catches for 70 receiving yards. The following week, he had 22 rushing attempts for a season-high 129 yards and a touchdown in a 23–20 loss to the Baltimore Ravens. On October 12, Bell had 21 rushes for 111 yards and scored the game-winning touchdown in the final seconds of regulation after taking a direct snap from the wildcat formation, helping the Steelers defeat the San Diego Chargers by a score of 24–20. During a Week 6 matchup with the Arizona Cardinals, Bell rushed a season-high 24 times and finished the 25–13 victory with 88 rushing yards.

On November 1, Bell suffered a season-ending torn MCL during the second quarter against the Cincinnati Bengals, after being tackled by linebacker Vontaze Burfict. The following day, the Steelers placed him on injured reserve, effectively ending his season. Bell finished the 2015 season with a total of 113 rushing attempts for 556 rushing yards and three touchdowns and 24 receptions for 136 receiving yards in six starts.

On November 6, it was reported by NFL Network analyst Jason La Canfora that Bell had undergone successful surgery to repair the damage to his MCL/PCL. Despite the injury, he was ranked 41st by his fellow players on the NFL Top 100 Players of 2016.

==== 2016 season ====
On August 19, 2016, Bell was officially suspended for the first three games of the 2016 regular season for violating the NFL's substance abuse policy. He stated in an apology on Twitter that the suspension was due to a missed random drug test in December. The original suspension was four games, but was reduced to three on appeal and as a part of a settlement between the league and the NFL Player's Association.

Bell played in his first game of the season on October 2 and recorded 18 carries for 144 rushing yards to go along with five receptions for 34 receiving yards in a 43–14 victory over the Kansas City Chiefs. In a Week 7 matchup against the New England Patriots, Bell caught a career-high 10 passes for 68 receiving yards and had 21 carries for 81 rushing yards in a 27–16 loss. On November 13, Bell had 17 carries for 57 yards and scored his first rushing touchdown of the season during a 30–35 loss to the Dallas Cowboys in Week 10. In addition, he accounted for nine receptions for 77 receiving yards and caught his first receiving touchdown of the season. The next game, he had 28 carries for 146 yards and a touchdown during a 24–9 victory over the Cleveland Browns in Week 11.

On December 11, against the Buffalo Bills, Bell broke the Steelers franchise record for rushing yards in a game with 236 rushing yards on a career-high 38 carries while scoring three touchdowns. The previous record was set by Willie Parker when he rushed for 223 yards in 2006. Bell was named as the AFC Offensive Player of the Week for his performance against the Bills. He was named to his second Pro Bowl on December 20, 2016 and was named AFC Offensive Player of the Month for December. Bell finished the 2016 regular season with 261 carries for 1,268 rushing yards and seven touchdowns, while also recording 75 catches for 616 receiving yards and two touchdowns in 12 games. He had a career-high four fumbles and lost only one. He recorded at least 100 yards from scrimmage in 11 of the 12 games he played in. Despite missing four games, he finished third in the NFL with 1,884 yards from scrimmage.

On January 8, 2017, Bell started in his first NFL playoff game and finished with 29 carries for a playoff franchise-record 167 rushing yards and two touchdowns in a 30–12 victory over the Miami Dolphins in the AFC Wild Card Round. His first career playoff touchdown came on a one-yard run in the second quarter and he also caught two passes for seven yards. The next week, he broke his own team playoff record with 170 rushing yards on 30 carries in an 18–16 win over the Kansas City Chiefs in the Divisional Round. As the first NFL player to rush over 150 yards in his first two playoff games, he also set a record for most rushing yards in a player's first two playoff games, became one of four players to ever rush for 150+ yards in back to back playoff games, and one of three players with two 160+ yard playoff games in a career. However, he suffered a groin injury late in the game, which grew unmanageable during the AFC Championship loss to the New England Patriots, and he was forced to leave in the second quarter. He finished tied for sixth in the AP Offensive Player of the Year Voting. Bell was ranked #9 by his fellow players on the NFL Top 100 Players of 2017.

==== 2017 season ====
On February 27, 2017, the Steelers placed the franchise tag on Bell. On September 24, Bell had six receptions for 37 receiving yards, 15 carries for 61 rushing yards, and scored his first touchdown of the season on a one-yard run as the Steelers lost to the Chicago Bears by a score of 23–17. The following week, he had a season-high 35 carries for 144 rushing yards and two touchdowns during the Pittsburgh Steelers 26–9 victory over the Baltimore Ravens. In Week 6, Bell rushed for 179 yards on 32 carries in a 19–13 win over the Kansas City Chiefs, earning him AFC Offensive Player of the Week. In Week 7, against the Cincinnati Bengals, he had 35 carries for 134 rushing yards in the 29–14 victory. In Week 12, against the Green Bay Packers, he had 20 carries for 95 rushing yards and 88 receiving yards on a career-high 12 receptions. During Monday Night Football against the Cincinnati Bengals in Week 13, Bell recorded 182 total yards of offense, with 106 receiving yards, 76 rushing yards, and a touchdown as the Steelers won 23–20. In Week 14, against the Baltimore Ravens, he had 13 carries for 48 rushing yards and two rushing touchdowns in the 39–38 victory. On December 19, Bell was named to his third Pro Bowl. Bell was named AFC Offensive Player of the Month for December. In addition, he was also named as a First-team All-Pro for the second time in his career. The Steelers secured a first round bye for the playoffs after going 13–3 in the regular season. Overall, he finished the 2017 season with a league-high 321 carries for 1,291 rushing yards and nine rushing touchdowns to go along with 85 receptions for 655 yards and two receiving touchdowns. He was ranked fifth by his peers on the NFL Top 100 Players of 2018.

On January 11, 2018, Bell said that if the Steelers franchise tagged him again, he would definitely consider sitting out for the year or retiring from the NFL. In 2016, Bell reportedly turned down a two-year deal worth $30 million. Bell said he was not concerned about making the most money possible, but instead wanted to be paid in relation with his value to the team, reportedly saying, "I just want to be valued where I'm at" and "Just get the numbers straight, exactly where we want them. I'm not going to settle for anything. I know what I do and what I bring to the table. I'm not going out here getting the ball 400 times if I'm not getting what I feel I'm valued at." After news broke across the internet, Bell tweeted: "I'm trying to win a super bowl...I can care less about what happens after this season...my biggest thing I'm focused on is this team I'm on right now, playing for/with my brothers, & bringing back a 7th ring! what happens next year is irrelevant to my goals". On January 14, Bell sent a tweet before playing in the AFC Divisional Round against the Jacksonville Jaguars saying "I love round 2's...we'll have two round 2's in back to back weeks...", referring to their rematch against the Jaguars, along with a possible rematch against the Patriots. The Steelers ended up losing to the Jaguars in a high scoring 45–42 affair in which Bell carried the ball 16 times and had 67 rushing yards and a rushing touchdown to go along with nine receptions for 88 yards and a receiving touchdown.

==== 2018 season ====
On March 6, 2018, the Steelers placed the franchise tag on Bell for the second straight year worth $14.5 million. Bell refused to sign the franchise tag and did not attend any team activities after contract negotiations stalled on July 16.

Bell missed the first nine regular season games, and then did not report to the Steelers prior to the NFL's November 13 deadline to sign his franchise tender, therefore making him ineligible to play in the 2018 NFL season.

On February 20, 2019, the Steelers announced that they would not use the franchise tag on Bell, making him a free agent at the start of the new official NFL year on March 13.

=== New York Jets ===
==== 2019 season ====
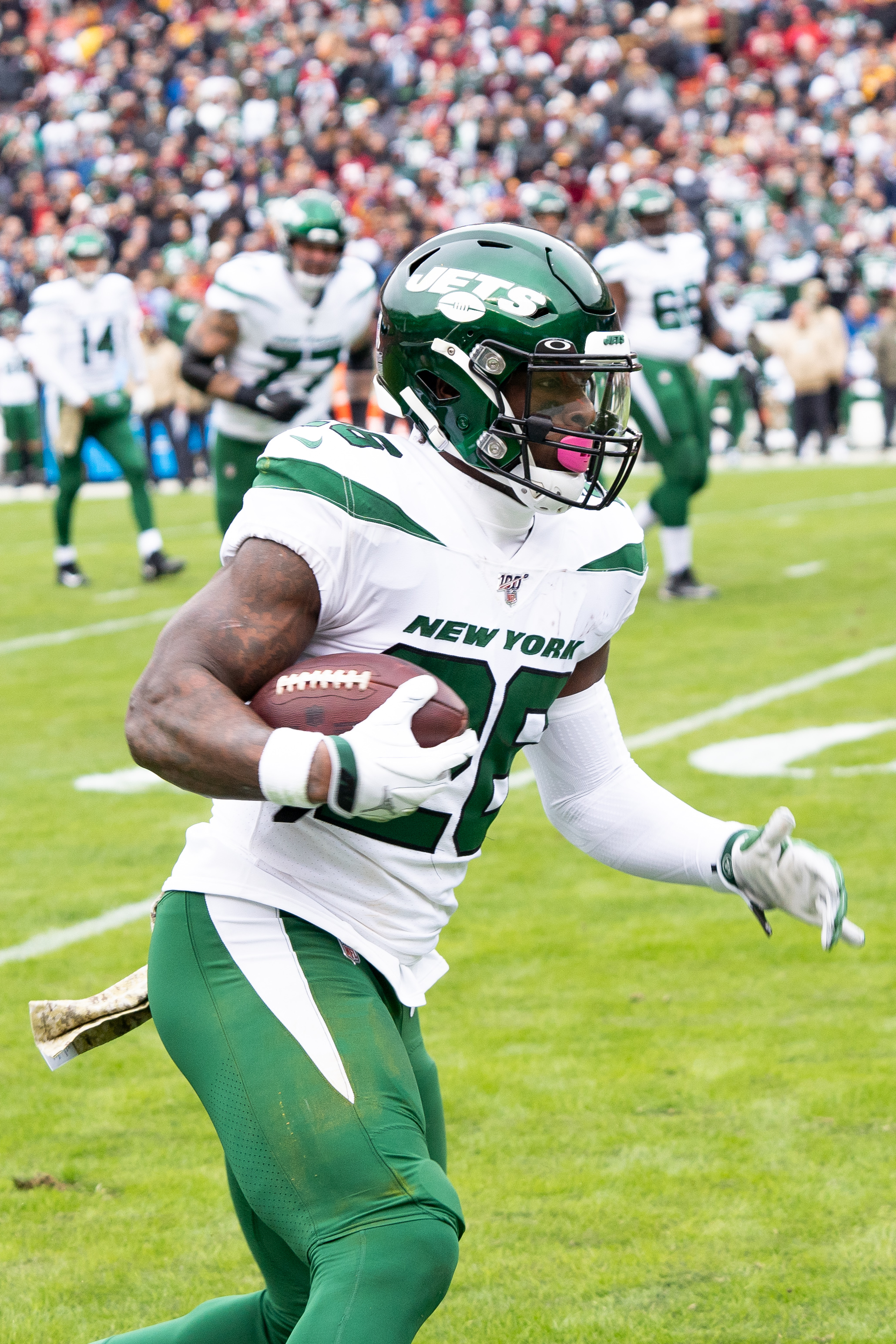
Bell in 2019

On March 13, 2019, Bell signed a four-year, $52.5 million contract with the New York Jets with $35 million guaranteed, making him the second highest paid running back in the NFL.

After holding out for the preseason, Bell played his first game with the Jets on September 8, 2019, against the Buffalo Bills where Bell rushed 17 times for 60 rushing yards and caught six passes for 32 receiving yards and a receiving touchdown as the Jets lost 17–16. Dealing with shoulder soreness, Bell played in Week 2 against the Cleveland Browns on Monday Night Football, where he finished with 68 rushing yards and a lost fumble as the Jets lost 23–3. In Week 6 against the Dallas Cowboys, Bell rushed 14 times for 50 yards and his first rushing touchdown of the season in the 24–22 win. During Week 16 against his former team, the Pittsburgh Steelers, Bell rushed 25 times for 72 yards and caught four passes for 21 yards in the 16–10 victory.

Bell finished the 2019 season 245 carries for 789 yards and three touchdowns to go along with 66 receptions for 461 yards and a touchdown in 15 games and starts.

==== 2020 season ====
Bell entered the 2020 season as the Jets' starting running back. He suffered a hamstring injury in the season opener against the Buffalo Bills and was placed on injured reserve on September 15, 2020. Bell was activated on October 10. In his return in Week 5 against the Arizona Cardinals, Bell rushed for 60 yards and caught one pass for seven yards during the 30–10 loss. After the game, Bell liked a tweet suggesting that the Jets should trade him. When asked about the social media interaction, Jets' head coach Adam Gase said that "I hate that's the route that we go with all of this instead of just talking to me about it, but it is the way guys want to do it nowadays." Bell was released by the Jets on October 13 after the team failed to find a trade partner.

=== Kansas City Chiefs ===
On October 17, 2020, Bell signed a one-year contract with the Kansas City Chiefs. In Week 11 against the Las Vegas Raiders, Bell rushed for 25 yards and a touchdown during the 35–31 victory. This was Bell's first touchdown as a Chief. Overall, Bell finished the 2020 regular season with 82 carries for 328 yards and two touchdowns to go along with 16 receptions for 138 yards.

=== Baltimore Ravens ===
On September 7, 2021, Bell was signed by the Baltimore Ravens to their practice squad. He was activated for Week 4 against Denver Broncos and for Week 6 against the Los Angeles Chargers, scoring his first touchdown of the season in the latter game. He was signed to the active roster on October 19. He was released on November 16.

=== Tampa Bay Buccaneers ===
On December 22, 2021, Bell signed with the Tampa Bay Buccaneers, reuniting with former Pittsburgh Steelers teammates Antonio Brown, Ross Cockrell, and Steve McLendon. He played in three total games for the Buccaneers and caught a touchdown from Tom Brady in Week 18 against the Carolina Panthers. Bell was released on January 22, 2022.

== Playing style ==
Bell was known for his unconventional running style. While not the fastest runner, Bell was still considered elusive due to his patience in waiting for his blockers to create running lanes before suddenly accelerating for a big gain, despite coaches and analysts advising running backs to "hit a hole with authority". CBS sportscaster Phil Simms nicknamed Bell the "Great Hesitator" due to his running style.

== Career statistics ==
Legend
	Led the league
**Bold**	Career high

=== NFL ===
==== Regular season ====
Year	Team	Games		Rushing					Receiving					Fumbles	
Year	Team	GP	GS	Att	Yds	Avg	Lng	TD	Rec	Yds	Avg	Lng	TD	Fum	Lost
2013	PIT	13	13	244	860	3.5	43	8	45	399	8.9	43	0	1	1
2014	PIT	16	16	290	**1,361**	4.7	**81**	8	83	**854**	10.3	**48**	**3**	0	0
2015	PIT	6	6	113	556	**4.9**	42	3	24	136	5.7	20	0	0	0
2016	PIT	12	12	261	1,268	**4.9**	44	7	75	616	8.2	32	2	**4**	1
2017	PIT	15	15	**321**	1,291	4.0	27	**9**	**85**	655	7.7	42	2	3	**2**
2018	PIT	0	0	Did not play due to holdout											
2019	NYJ	15	15	245	789	3.2	19	3	66	461	7.0	23	1	1	1
2020	NYJ	2	2	19	74	3.9	13	0	3	39	**13.0**	30	0	0	0
2020	KC	9	2	63	254	4.0	16	2	13	99	7.6	18	0	1	0
2021	BAL	5	0	31	83	2.7	12	2	1	−1	−1.0	−1	0	0	0
2021	TB	3	0	8	18	2.3	7	0	4	31	7.8	15	1	0	0
Career		96	81	1,595	6,554	4.1	81	42	399	3,289	8.2	48	9	10	5

==== Postseason ====
Year	Team	Games		Rushing					Receiving					Fumbles	
Year	Team	GP	GS	Att	Yds	Avg	Lng	TD	Rec	Yds	Avg	Lng	TD	Fum	Lost
2016	PIT	3	3	**65**	**357**	**5.5**	**38**	**2**	4	3	0.8	4	0	0	0
2017	PIT	1	1	16	67	4.2	21	1	**9**	**88**	**9.8**	**22**	**1**	0	0
2020	KC	1	0	2	6	3.0	4	0	0	0	0.0	0	0	0	0
2021	TB	0	0	DNP											
Career		5	4	83	430	5.2	38	3	13	91	7.0	22	1	0	0

=== College ===
Season	Team	Games		Rushing						Receiving						Kick returns				
Season	Team	GP	GS	Att	Yds	Avg	Lng	TD	Y/G	Rec	Yds	Avg	Lng	TD	Y/G	Ret	Yds	Avg	Lng	TD
2010	Michigan State	13	0	107	605	**5.7**	**75**	8	46.5	11	97	**8.8**	35	0	7.5	**6**	**142**	23.7	**32**	0
2011	Michigan State	14	6	182	948	5.2	35	**13**	67.7	**35**	**267**	7.6	**45**	0	**19.1**	1	31	**31.0**	31	0
2012	Michigan State	13	13	**382**	**1,793**	4.7	40	12	**137.9**	32	167	5.2	20	**1**	12.8	4	46	11.5	31	0
Total		40	19	671	3,346	5.0	75	33	83.7	78	531	6.8	45	1	13.3	11	219	19.9	32	0

== Career highlights ==
=== Awards and honors ===
NFL

- 2× First-team All-Pro (2014, 2017 (Note: Selected as the flex))
- 2× Second-team All-Pro (2016 (Note: Selected as the flex), 2017 (Note: Selected as a running back))
- 3× Pro Bowl (2014, 2016, 2017)
- First-team All-American (2012)
- FedEx Ground Player of the Year (2014)
- 4× NFL Top 100 — 16th (2015), 41st (2016), 9th (2017), 5th (2018)

College

- First-team All-Big Ten (2012)
- Buffalo Wild Wings Bowl Offensive MVP (2012)

=== Records ===
==== NFL records ====
- First NFL player to rush over 150 yards in his first two playoff games
- Most rushing yards in a player's first two playoff games: 337

==== Steelers franchise records ====
- Most rushing yards per game: 86.1
- Most receptions by a running back: 307
- Most receptions by a running back in a season: 85 (2017)
- Most receiving yards by a running back in a season: 854 (2014)
- Most receiving yards in a single game by a running back: 159 (November 30, 2014, against the New Orleans Saints)
- Most scrimmage yards in a season: 2,215 (2014)
- Most rushing yards in a game: 236 (December 11, 2016, against the Buffalo Bills)
- Most rushing yards in a playoff game: 170 (January 15, 2017, in the Divisional Round against the Kansas City Chiefs)
- Most games with at least 200 rushing yards: 2 (tied with Willie Parker)

== Musical career ==
Bell, going by the stage name "Juice", started his music career with a 16-song album released via SoundCloud on March 27, 2017. On May 27, 2018, Bell released a single titled "Target" responding to critics in regards to his contract dispute with the Steelers among other things. He followed up "Target" with a four-song project titled "My Side of Things" telling his side of the story regarding his second straight contract hold out with the Steelers. On March 13, 2019, Bell released an album called "Life is a Gamble".

== Boxing career ==
Bell had expressed interest in boxing as an alternative career. In December 2021, before the Buccaneers signed him, Bell had planned to retire from the NFL to pursue a professional boxing career. He tweeted a challenge to Jake Paul, accusing him of fighting "small dudes who can't box".

=== Exhibition career ===
==== Bell vs. Peterson ====
In July 2022, Bell announced that he would sit out the 2022 NFL season to pursue boxing, starting with an exhibition match against fellow NFL veteran Adrian Peterson. The fight was originally scheduled for July 31 at the Crypto.com Arena in Los Angeles, but was postponed after AnEsonGib, a fighter in the card's main event, had medical issues. On September 10, at Banc of California Stadium, Bell defeated Peterson in a fifth-round technical knockout after knocking Peterson down and Peterson being unable to continue.

==== Bell vs. Supah Hot Fire ====
On October 31, 2025, it was announced that Bell would face American influencer Supah Hot Fire in an exhibition bout as the main event for Brand Risk 011 on November 7. Bell defeated Supah Hot Fire via unanimous decision.

=== Professional career ===
==== Bell vs. Hall ====
On October 29, 2022, Bell made his professional boxing debut against American mixed martial arts fighter Uriah Hall at the Desert Diamond Arena in Glendale, Arizona. Hall defeated Bell via unanimous decision.

==== Bell vs. JMX ====
On March 4, 2023, it was announced that Bell would face British YouTuber JMX as the headline bout for MF & DAZN: X Series 006 at the XULA Convocation Centre in New Orleans, Louisiana, on April 21. Bell defeated JMX via unanimous decision.

==== MFB Cruiserweight Title Tournament ====
===== Bell vs. Hamm =====
On April 12, 2024, it was announced that Bell would participate in the MFB Cruiserweight Title Tournament, where the winner would be crowned the new MFB cruiserweight champion. He was matched up with Canadian influencer Tristan Hamm for the quarter-final of the tournament. On April 19, it was announced that the bout would be the co-main for MF & DAZN: X Series 15 at the NRG Arena in Houston, Texas, on May 25. Bell defeated Hamm via unanimous decision. Bell was originally scheduled to face Nigerian reality television personality Mike Edwards in the semi-finals, but as of November 2026, the tournament has yet to continue.

=== Boxing record ===
==== Professional ====
3 fights	2 wins	1 loss
By decision	2	1

No.	Result	Record	Opponent	Type	Round, time	Date	Location	Notes
3	Win	2–1	Tristan Hamm	UD	5	May 25, 2024	NRG Arena, Houston, Texas, U.S.	MFB cruiserweight tournament quarter-final
2	Win	1–1	JMX	UD	4	April 21, 2023	XULA Convocation Centre, New Orleans, Louisiana, U.S.	
1	Loss	0–1	Uriah Hall	UD	4	Oct 29, 2022	Desert Diamond Arena, Glendale, Arizona, U.S.	

==== Exhibition ====
2 fights	2 wins	0 losses
By knockout	1	0
By decision	1	0

No.	Result	Record	Opponent	Type	Round, time	Date	Location	Notes
2	Win	2–0	Supah Hot Fire	UD	3	Nov 7, 2025	Worldwide Stages, Nashville, Tennessee, U.S.	
1	Win	1–0	Adrian Peterson	TKO	5 (5), 0:30	Sep 10, 2022	Bank of California Stadium, Los Angeles, U.S.	

== Television and film career ==
In 2022, Bell competed in season eight of The Masked Singer as "Milkshake". He was eliminated on "90s Night" alongside Joey Lawrence as "Walrus".

== Personal life ==
Bell was born February 18, 1992, in Reynoldsburg, Ohio, to Lisa A. Bell. His mother and grandfather have been lifelong Pittsburgh Steelers fans. Throughout his childhood, his mother raised Bell and his siblings by herself and struggled financially. Bell has two older sisters and two younger brothers, both of whom also play football. He cites his high school principal, Donis Toler Jr., and his mother as the two people responsible for helping him achieve his success. Toler was a father figure in Bell's life and helped him get noticed by Michigan State.

He has numerous tattoos, including quotations from Christian scriptures. He has Jeremiah 1:5 on his left arm with a picture of his mother embracing him after Michigan State suffered a loss in the Big Ten Championship. Bell also has John 3:16 on his left arm, along with "That whosoever believeth in him should not perish, but have eternal life."

In May 2020, Bell partnered with professional Super Smash Bros. player Juan "Hungrybox" DeBiedma and esports organization Team Liquid to create an online Super Smash Bros. Ultimate tournament, The Box. At 8,192 participants, it was the largest Super Smash Bros. tournament of all time. Bell had an overall record of 7–2, finishing just before the round of 256. He used Mega Man throughout the tournament.

Bell endorsed Donald Trump in the 2024 United States presidential election.

=== Legal issues ===
On August 20, 2014, Bell was driving with his then-Steelers teammate LeGarrette Blount and Bell's girlfriend at the time, Mercedes Dollson, when he was pulled over by the police. The officer searched the car after he claimed to notice the smell of marijuana. The search yielded 20 grams of marijuana, and the three were arrested for marijuana possession. Bell was sentenced to 15 months of probation, a 60-day suspension of his driver's license, DUI education classes, and $2,400 in court costs.

In February 2025, an Ohio jury found Bell liable for $25 million in compensatory and punitive damages related to a sexual abuse case brought by a female relative for events which occurred when she was a minor. His brother La'Vonte, a co-defendant in the case, was ordered to pay $11 million.
