= 2012 Buffalo Wild Wings Bowl =

- 24th Buffalo Wild Wings Bowl
TCU Horned Frogs	Michigan State Spartans
(7–5)	(6–6)
Big 12	Big Ten
16	17
Head coach: Gary Patterson	Head coach: Mark Dantonio
	1	2	3	4	Total
TCU	7	6	0	3	16
Michigan State	0	0	7	10	17
- Date: December 29, 2012
- Season: 2012
- Stadium: Sun Devil Stadium
- Location: Tempe, Arizona
- MVP: Offensive: Le'Veon Bell (RB, Michigan State); Defensive: William Gholston (DE, Michigan State)
- Favorite: TCU by 2
- Referee: Jack Folliard (Pac-12)
- Attendance: 44,617

United States TV coverage
- Network: ESPN
- Announcers: Brad Nessler (Play-by-Play); Todd Blackledge (Analyst); Holly Rowe (sidelines)
- Nielsen ratings: 3.0

The 2012 Buffalo Wild Wings Bowl, the 24th edition of the Buffalo Wild Wings Bowl, although the first played under that name, was a post-season American college football bowl game held on December 29, 2012 at Sun Devil Stadium in Tempe, Arizona as part of the 2012–13 NCAA Bowl season.

The game was telecast at 8:15 p.m. MT on ESPN. It featured the Michigan State Spartans of the Big Ten Conference against the TCU Horned Frogs of the Big 12 Conference. Down 13–0 at the half, the Spartans rallied back to win 17–16, having taken the lead for good with only 1:01 remaining in the contest.

== Teams ==
This game marked the second meeting of the two teams. Their first meeting was in 1953, which the Spartans won 26–19. The Buffalo Wild Wings Bowl had fourth selection of Big Ten teams and third selection of Big 12 teams, both after BCS selections. From the Big Ten, conference champion Wisconsin (Rose), Nebraska (Capital One), Michigan (Outback), and Northwestern (Gator) were already selected, and Penn State and Ohio State were ineligible due to NCAA sanctions. From the Big 12, conference champion Kansas State (Fiesta), Oklahoma (Cotton Bowl Classic), and Texas (Alamo) were selected before TCU.

=== TCU ===
TCU finished the 2011 season 11–2 and ranked #13 in the Coaches Poll and #14 in the AP Poll. In 2012, they changed conferences from the Mountain West Conference to the Big 12 Conference. They entered the season ranked #17 in the Coaches Poll, but after losses to Iowa State and Texas Tech they spent the rest of the season unranked. Like the Spartans, they failed to win any home conference games. They still were able to accumulate a 7–5 record, enough to send them to their eighth consecutive bowl game. In that bowl streak, the Horned Frogs had only lost once prior to this matchup.

The 2011 Horned Frogs were known more for their defense than offense. Junior quarterback Casey Pachall left the team after four games due to an arrest for suspicion of DWI, putting the offense into the hands of freshman Trevone Boykin. Boykin ended the regular season with 15 touchdown passes and 9 interceptions. TCU's rushing attack was last in the Big 12, averaging 3.9 yards per carry. Defensively, the Horned Frogs led the Big 12, ceding an average of only 332.0 yards per game, ranking them 18th in the nation. The Horned Frogs defense was led by AP Big 12 defensive player of the year Devonte Fields, a freshman.

=== Michigan State ===
Michigan State's 2012 campaign was also a letdown from the prior year's. That year the Spartans went 11–3, continued a two-year undefeated streak at home, advanced to the inaugural Big Ten Championship Game, defeated SEC powerhouse Georgia in the Outback Bowl, and ended the season ranked #10 in the Coaches Poll. However, the departure of key offensive players—notably Kirk Cousins and Keshawn Martin, who were both selected in the fourth round of the 2012 NFL draft—proved costly for the 2012 Spartans. After surging to a #10 ranking in the Coaches Poll, the Spartans were favorites to be the Big 10's representative for the Rose Bowl. A defeat at Spartan Stadium to Notre Dame snapped their home win streak, and the Spartans stumbled into conference play with a come-from-behind win over Eastern Michigan, who ended the season 2–10. The Spartans went 3–5 in conference play, losing all of their home games. Those five losses were by a combined 13 points. The lone bright spot in that period came when Michigan State snapped a 21-game home winning streak for Wisconsin by beating the eventual Rose Bowl representatives, giving the Spartans their first win in Camp Randall Stadium since 2001. MSU only earned bowl eligibility by defeating Minnesota in the final game of the season.

Offensively, the Spartans were led by tailback Le'Veon Bell, who ended the regular season with 1,648 yards for 11 touchdowns, averaging 137.3 yards per game and earning 834 of his yards after contact. The Spartans were ranked 9th in the Big Ten for total offense, averaging 370.3 yards per game. Michigan State's offense managed only 21 touchdowns in 42 red zone trips this season and only 25 overall. Spartan quarterback Andrew Maxwell saw almost all the action that year, throwing for 2,578 yards and 13 touchdowns with a 53% completion rating. Backup quarterback Connor Cook only saw action in two games, going 5 for 6 with no touchdowns and one interception, which was returned for a score.

On the defensive side, Michigan State led the Big Ten, giving up 273.3 yards per game and 16.3 points per game. They ranked in the top 10 nationally for total defense, scoring defense, rushing defense, and passing efficiency and yardage defenses. Junior linebacker Max Bullough led the Spartans with 101 tackles, while William Gholston's 3.5 sacks and Darqueze Dennard's three interceptions were also team leaders. Senior cornerback Johnny Adams, who also had three interceptions, was unable to play in the bowl game due to an injury. The Spartans earned 13 interceptions during the regular season, 3rd best in the Big Ten.

== Game summary ==
The first half of the game was dominated by TCU. After a combined three opening three-and-outs to start, TCU marched 73 yards (the first 20 of which came from MSU Penalties) down the field in nine plays, scoring a touchdown on a 4-yard run by Matthew Tucker. A successful PAT put TCU up 7–0. On TCU's next drive, they had a first down to start the second quarter at the MSU 19-yard line. A five-yard penalty and a nine-yard sack forced TCU's Jaden Oberkrom to kick a 47-yard field goal. MSU played backup quarterback Connor Cook during their next drive, but only gained 16 yards. TCU took over after the punt on their own 4 yard line. Thanks to a 61-yard pass to junior Josh Boyce followed by a 15-yard penalty against the Spartans, Oberkrom was again able to finish the drive with a field goal. With Maxwell playing quarterback again, the Spartans gained 21 yards before punting. On TCU's next possession, Trevone Boykin was intercepted at MSU's 7 yard line. After another three-and-out for MSU, TCU kneeled to run out the time in the half. MSU ended all of its drives in the half with punts. Only three of MSU's seven drives in the first half resulted in a first down, and all were limited to only one each.

Both teams started the second half with drives that earned only one first down. On MSU's second possession of the half, Connor Cook resumed quarterback duties. Starting at their own 10, the Spartans were propelled by Le'Veon Bell, who rushed for 35 yards and passed for another 29. a 15-yard pass from Cook to Aaron Burbridge gave MSU its first points of the night with 43 seconds left in the third quarter. The teams then exchanged two punts each; on MSU's second punt, however, TCU's Skye Dawson fumbled. Spartan RJ Williamson recovered, giving MSU the ball four yards from the opposing end zone. A four-yard rushing touchdown and a successful PAT gave MSU its first lead with 7:00 remaining in the game. Both teams went three-and-out on their ensuing possessions. After a 15-yard penalty on the Spartan punt, the Horned Frogs took over at their own 36 with 4:26 remaining. Sparked by a 27-yard pass to LaDarius Brown, TCU got close enough for Oberkrom to kick a career-long 53 yard field goal. The Spartans responded with a 47-yard field goal from Conroy with 1:01 remaining. The Horned Frogs were unable to get a first down on their next drive, giving the ball—and the win—to MSU with 21 seconds remaining.

TCU quarterback Trevone Boykin ended the game with 201 yards passing and 37 yards rushing, while Spartan quarterbacks Maxwell and Cook threw for 28 and 47 yards, respectively. Spartan tailback Le'Veon Bell threw for 29 yards—more than his first-string quarterback—and ran for 145 yards and a touchdown. TCU recorded three sacks, the Spartans 4. Jason Verret and Kenny Cain led the Horned frogs with 12 tackles each, while William Gholston and Max Bullough had 9 each for the Spartans. Michigan State safety Isaiah Lewis recorded the only interception of the game. Bell and Gholtson earned the honors of offensive and defensive MVPs, respectively.

=== Scoring summary ===
Scoring summary

Quarter	Time	Drive			Team	Scoring information	Score	
Quarter	Time	Plays	Yards	TOP	Team	Scoring information	TCU	Michigan State
1	5:45	9	73	4:31	TCU	Matthew Tucker 4-yard touchdown run, Jaden Oberkrom kick good	7	0
2	13:25	7	50	3:47	TCU	47-yard field goal by Jaden Oberkrom	10	0
2	8:18	7	83	2:55	TCU	31-yard field goal by Jaden Oberkrom	13	0
3	0:34	14	90	6:34	MSU	Aaron Burbridge 15-yard touchdown reception from Connor Cook, Dan Conroy kick good	13	7
4	7:00	2	4	00:13	MSU	Le'Veon Bell 4-yard touchdown run, Dan Conroy kick good	13	14
4	2:42	6	28	1:44	TCU	53-yard field goal by Jaden Oberkrom	16	14
4	1:01	8	36	1:41	MSU	47-yard field goal by Dan Conroy	16	17
"TOP" = time of possession. For other American football terms, see Glossary of American football.							16	17

=== Statistics ===
Statistic	TCU	MSU
First downs	11	13
Total offense, plays - yards	59–288	69–249
Rushes-yards (net)	30–87	41–145
Fumbles - Fumbles lost	1–1	1–0
Passing yards (net)	201	104
Passes, Comp-Att-Int	13–29–1	11–28–0
Time of Possession	26:57	33:03
Penalties - yards	5–39	7–72
Punts - Average yards	7–39.3	11–43.7

== Sponsorship ==
Prior to 2012, the bowl game that would become the Buffalo Wild Wings Bowl had been named the Insight Bowl since 2002 (and before that it had been the Insight.com Bowl since 1997). After the 2011 game, the sponsorship contract with Insight Enterprises expired, and the naming rights were put on the market. On July 23, 2012, Buffalo Wild Wings was announced as the new sponsor. The multi-year agreement included a new trophy and logo. Promotional tie-ins included a wing-eating contest between the two teams.
