= 2012 Michigan State Spartans football team =

American college football season

2012 Michigan State Spartans football

Buffalo Wild Wings Bowl champion

Buffalo Wild Wings Bowl, W 17–16 vs. TCU
- Conference: Big Ten Conference
- Legends Division
- Record: 7–6 (3–5 Big Ten)
- Head coach: Mark Dantonio (6th season)
- Offensive coordinator: Dan Roushar (2nd season)
- Offensive scheme: Pro-style
- Defensive coordinator: Pat Narduzzi (6th season)
- Base defense: 4–3
- Captains: Max Bullough; Andrew Maxwell; Chris Norman
- Home stadium: Spartan Stadium

2012 Big Ten Conference football standings
	Conf.			Overall
Team	W		L	W		L
Legends Division
No. 25 Nebraska xy	7	–	1	10	–	4
No. 24 Michigan	6	–	2	8	–	5
No. 17 Northwestern	5	–	3	10	–	3
Michigan State	3	–	5	7	–	6
Iowa	2	–	6	4	–	8
Minnesota	2	–	6	6	–	7
Leaders Division
No. 3 Ohio State* x	8	–	0	12	–	0
Penn State*	6	–	2	8	–	4
Wisconsin y$	4	–	4	8	–	6
Purdue	3	–	5	6	–	7
Indiana	2	–	6	4	–	8
Illinois	0	–	8	2	–	10
Championship: Wisconsin 70, Nebraska 31
$ – BCS representative as conference champion; x – Division champion/co-champions; * Ohio State and Penn State ineligible for conference championship game and post-season bowl games due to NCAA sanctions.; Rankings from AP Poll

The 2012 Michigan State Spartans football team represented Michigan State University in the Legends Division of the Big Ten Conference during the 2012 NCAA Division I FBS football season. Michigan State played their home games at Spartan Stadium in East Lansing, Michigan and were led by sixth-year head coach Mark Dantonio. They finished the season 7–6, 3–5 in Big Ten play to finish in fourth place in the Legends Division. They were invited to the Buffalo Wild Wings Bowl, where they defeated TCU, 17–16.

== Before the season ==
=== 2012 NFL draft ===
Round	Pick#	Team	Player	Position
2	51	Green Bay Packers	Jerel Worthy	Defensive tackle
4	102	Washington Redskins	Kirk Cousins	Quarterback
4	121	Houston Texans	Keshawn Martin	Wide receiver
6	180	San Francisco 49ers	Trenton Robinson	Safety
6	183	Miami Dolphins	B. J. Cunningham	Wide receiver
7	250	San Diego Chargers	Edwin Baker	Running back

==== Undrafted free agents ====
Team	Player	Position
Miami Dolphins	Arthur Ray Jr.	Offensive guard
Washington Redskins	Keith Nichol	Wide receiver
New York Jets	Brian Linthicum	Tight end
San Francisco 49ers	Garrett Celek	Tight end
St. Louis Rams	Todd Anderson	Fullback / running back

=== Transfers in ===
DeAnthony Arnett, sophomore wide receiver, University of Tennessee

=== Transfers out ===
- Matt Giampapa, long snapper, transferred to the University of Tennessee
- Matt Ramondo, defensive tackle, transferred to New Mexico State University

=== Returning players ===
Michigan State returns 9 of 11 starters (losing defensive tackle Jerel Worthy and safety Trenton Robinson, in addition to DT Kevin Pickleman, a spot starter) from the nationally ranked 2011 defense, and returns 6 starters on offense, having to replace QB Kirk Cousins, WR B.J. Cunningham, RB Edwin Baker, WR Keith Nichol, OG Joel Foreman, and WR Keshawn Martin. Overall, MSU suffered very little roster attrition. The entire special teams unit remains intact, except for starting long snapper Matt Giampapa, who left the program during the summer for personal reasons. Redshirt freshman DT Matt Ramondo transferred to New Mexico State during the summer before the season.

=== Early NFL departures ===
Edwin Baker RB
Jerel Worthy DT

=== Recruiting class ===
College recruiting (2012)
Name	Hometown	School	Height	Weight	40^{‡}	Commit date
Riley Bullough; LB	Traverse City, MI	St. Francis	6 ft 2 in (1.88 m)	220 lb (100 kg)	–	Apr 30, 2011
Riley Bullough; LB	Recruit ratings: Scout: Rivals: (77)					
Aaron Burbridge; WR	Farmington, MI	Harrison	6 ft 2 in (1.88 m)	180 lb (82 kg)	4.40	Jul 28, 2011
Aaron Burbridge; WR	Recruit ratings: Scout: Rivals: (79)					
Demetrious Cox; S	Jeannette, PA	Jeannette Shs	6 ft 1 in (1.85 m)	187 lb (85 kg)	4.50	Jan 30, 2012
Demetrious Cox; S	Recruit ratings: Scout: Rivals: (79)					
Jermaine Edmondson; CB	Canton, OH	McKinley	6 ft 2 in (1.88 m)	170 lb (77 kg)	–	Jul 28, 2011
Jermaine Edmondson; CB	Recruit ratings: Scout: Rivals: (77)					
David Fennell; DT	Portland, OR	Sunset	6 ft 3 in (1.91 m)	275 lb (125 kg)	–	Jul 23, 2012
David Fennell; DT	Recruit ratings: Scout: Rivals: (75)					
Zach Higgins; OT	Alliance, OH	Marlington	6 ft 5 in (1.96 m)	310 lb (140 kg)	–	Apr 30, 2011
Zach Higgins; OT	Recruit ratings: Scout: Rivals: (77)					
Evan Jones; TE	West Lafayette, OH	Ridgewood	6 ft 6 in (1.98 m)	240 lb (110 kg)	–	May 7, 2011
Evan Jones; TE	Recruit ratings: Scout: Rivals: (45)					
Kyle Kerrick; WR	Coatesville, PA	Coatesville Area Shs	6 ft 3 in (1.91 m)	185 lb (84 kg)	–	Jun 23, 2011
Kyle Kerrick; WR	Recruit ratings: Scout: Rivals: (77)					
Kodi Kieler; OT	Rockwood, MI	Oscar A. Carlson	6 ft 6 in (1.98 m)	307 lb (139 kg)	–	Aug 8, 2011
Kodi Kieler; OT	Recruit ratings: Scout: Rivals: (75)					
MacGarrett Kings; WR	Fort Lauderdale, FL	University School	6 ft 0 in (1.83 m)	186 lb (84 kg)	–	Jul 13, 2011
MacGarrett Kings; WR	Recruit ratings: Scout: Rivals: (77)					
Jamal Lyles; OLB	Southfield, MI	Southfield-lathrup	6 ft 4 in (1.93 m)	215 lb (98 kg)	–	Jun 23, 2011
Jamal Lyles; OLB	Recruit ratings: Scout: Rivals: (76)					
Monty Madaris; WR	Cincinnati, OH	Archbishop Moeller	6 ft 1 in (1.85 m)	190 lb (86 kg)	–	Feb 2, 2012
Monty Madaris; WR	Recruit ratings: Scout: Rivals: (80)					
Benny McGowan; OG	Dayton, OH	Centerville	6 ft 4 in (1.93 m)	290 lb (130 kg)	–	Apr 30, 2011
Benny McGowan; OG	Recruit ratings: Scout: Rivals: (79)					
Mark Meyers; S	Toledo, OH	Whitmer	6 ft 0 in (1.83 m)	190 lb (86 kg)	4.46	Jan 22, 2012
Mark Meyers; S	Recruit ratings: Scout: Rivals: (78)					
Tyler O'Connor; QB	Lima, OH	Lima Central Catholic	6 ft 3 in (1.91 m)	205 lb (93 kg)	4.7	Jun 6, 2011
Tyler O'Connor; QB	Recruit ratings: Scout: Rivals: (77)					
Josiah Price; TE	Greentown, IN	Eastern Jr & Sr	6 ft 5 in (1.96 m)	240 lb (110 kg)	4.78	Jun 23, 2011
Josiah Price; TE	Recruit ratings: Scout: Rivals: (78)					
Ezra Robinson; CB	Sarasota, FL	Booker	6 ft 1 in (1.85 m)	188 lb (85 kg)	–	Nov 3, 2011
Ezra Robinson; CB	Recruit ratings: Scout: Rivals: (75)					
Nick Tompkins; RB	Snellville, GA	Brookwood	5 ft 9 in (1.75 m)	182 lb (83 kg)	4.40	Jun 26, 2011
Nick Tompkins; RB	Recruit ratings: Scout: Rivals: (75)					
Overall recruit ranking: Scout: 37 Rivals: 40
Note: In many cases, Scout, Rivals, 247Sports, On3, and ESPN may conflict in their listings of height and weight.; In these cases, the average was taken. ESPN grades are on a 100-point scale.; Sources: "2012 Team Ranking". Rivals.com.

== Schedule ==
Date	Time	Opponent	Rank	Site	TV	Result	Attendance
August 31	8:00 p.m.	No. 24 Boise State*	No. 13	Spartan Stadium; East Lansing, MI	ESPN	W 17–13	78,709
September 8	3:30 p.m.	at Central Michigan*	No. 11	Kelly/Shorts Stadium; Mount Pleasant, MI	ESPNU	W 41–7	35,127
September 15	8:00 p.m.	No. 20 Notre Dame*	No. 10	Spartan Stadium; East Lansing, MI (Megaphone Trophy)	ABC	L 3–20	79,219
September 22	3:30 p.m.	Eastern Michigan*	No. 21	Spartan Stadium; East Lansing, MI	BTN	W 23–7	74,204
September 29	3:30 p.m.	No. 14 Ohio State	No. 20	Spartan Stadium; East Lansing, MI (College GameDay)	ABC	L 16–17	76,705
October 6	12:00 p.m.	at Indiana		Memorial Stadium; Bloomington, IN (Old Brass Spittoon)	BTN	W 31–27	45,979
October 13	12:00 p.m.	Iowa^{†}		Spartan Stadium; East Lansing, MI	ESPN	L 16–19 ^{2OT}	70,211
October 20	3:30 p.m.	at No. 23 Michigan		Michigan Stadium; Ann Arbor, MI (Paul Bunyan Trophy)	BTN	L 10–12	113,833
October 27	3:30 p.m.	at No. 25 Wisconsin		Camp Randall Stadium; Madison, WI	ABC/ESPN2	W 16–13 ^{OT}	80,538
November 3	3:30 p.m.	No. 21 Nebraska		Spartan Stadium; East Lansing, MI	ABC/ESPN2	L 24–28	73,522
November 17	12:00 p.m.	Northwestern		Spartan Stadium; East Lansing, MI	ESPN2	L 20–23	75,101
November 24	3:30 p.m.	at Minnesota		TCF Bank Stadium; Minneapolis, MN	BTN	W 26–10	44,194
December 29	10:15 p.m.	vs. TCU*		Sun Devil Stadium; Tempe, AZ (Buffalo Wild Wings Bowl)	ESPN	W 17–16	44,617
*Non-conference game; ^{†}Homecoming; Rankings from AP Poll released prior to game; All times are in Eastern time

== Game summaries ==
=== Boise State ===
Boise State at Michigan State

Team	1	2	3	4	Total
#24 Boise State	3	10	0	0	13
• #13 Michigan State	10	0	0	7	17

- Date: August 31
- Location:
  Spartan Stadium
  East Lansing, MI
- Game start: 8:06 p.m. EDT
- Elapsed time: 3:12
- Game attendance: 78,709
- Game weather: 84 °F (29 °C), Wind 10 mph (16 km/h) WNW, Partly Cloudy
- Referee: Randy Chistal
- TV announcers (ESPN):
  Carter Blackburn (Play-by-Play)
  Rod Gilmore (Analyst)
  Jemele Hill (Sideline)

The Spartans overcame several large mistakes in the passing game with their top-flight defense and the efforts of Le'Veon Bell, who had 210 yards rushing on 44 carries and 56 receiving yards. MSU held Boise State to just 37 yards rushing, and scored the game-winning touchdown with 8 minutes left. Michigan State retook possession with 6:32 remaining after a failed attempt to convert a 4th down by the Broncos. The Spartans successfully ran out the remainder of the time on their ensuing possession, eventually taking a knee at the goal line to ensure the victory.

=== Central Michigan ===
Michigan State at Central Michigan

Team	1	2	3	4	Total
• #11 Michigan State	7	17	10	7	41
Central Michigan	0	0	0	7	7

- Date: September 8
- Location:
  Kelly/Shorts Stadium
  Mount Pleasant, MI
- Game start: 3:32 p.m. EDT
- Elapsed time: 3:06
- Game attendance: 35,127
- Game weather: 60 °F (16 °C), Wind 8–10 mph (13–16 km/h) NW, Cloudy
- Referee: Bill LeMonnier
- TV announcers (ESPNU):
  Anish Shroff (Play-by-Play)
  Dan Hawkins (Analyst)

Part of its Celebrate the State campaign, Michigan State traveled to Mt. Pleasant for the rare occurrence of a power conference team traveling to the stadium of a small-conference school. Michigan State held a 14–0 lead as the second quarter wound down, but they scored 10 points in the final minute of the half, heading to the locker room up 24–0. The Spartans carried a shutout into the final two minutes, when second-string quarterback Connor Cook threw an interception that Jason Wilson returned for a touchdown. Central Michigan failed to score an offensive touchdown, as Boise State had the week before against MSU.

=== Notre Dame ===
Notre Dame at Michigan State
(Megaphone Trophy)

Team	1	2	3	4	Total
• #20 Notre Dame	7	7	0	6	20
#10 Michigan State	0	3	0	0	3

- Date: September 15
- Location:
  Spartan Stadium
  East Lansing, MI
- Game start: 8:12 p.m. EDT
- Elapsed time: 3:21
- Game attendance: 79,219
- Game weather: 68 °F (20 °C), Wind 2 mph (3.2 km/h) NE, Clear
- Referee: Dennis Hennigan
- TV announcers (ABC):
  Brent Musburger (Play-by-Play)
  Kirk Herbstreit (Analyst)
  Heather Cox (Sideline)

MSU was defeated by the Notre Dame at home in East Lansing. Le'veon Bell was held to 77 yards of offense. At the end of the night, Michigan State had accumulated 50 yards of offense against the Fighting Irish. On the other hand, Notre Dame managed 122 yards rushing and 300 yards total against the Spartan defense. In addition, the offensive line of Michigan State gave up 5 sacks to Notre Dame in the Irish win. This loss broke the Spartans' 15-home game winning streak.

=== Eastern Michigan ===
Eastern Michigan at Michigan State

Team	1	2	3	4	Total
Eastern Michigan	0	7	0	0	7
• #21 Michigan State	0	3	6	14	23

- Date: September 22
- Location:
  Spartan Stadium
  East Lansing, MI
- Game start: 3:31 p.m. EDT
- Elapsed time: 3:11
- Game attendance: 74,204
- Game weather: 56 °F (13 °C), Wind 10 mph (16 km/h) WNW, Cloudy
- Referee: Dennis Lipski
- TV announcers (BTN):
  Matt Devlin (Play-by-Play)
  Glen Mason (Analyst)
  Rebecca Haarlow (Sideline)

The Spartans came from behind in the second half to defeat the Eagles in a game that featured a career-high 253 yards rushing from Michigan State's top running back Le'Veon Bell.

=== Ohio State ===
Ohio State at Michigan State

Team	1	2	3	4	Total
• #14 Ohio State	7	0	10	0	17
#20 Michigan State	3	0	10	3	16

- Date: September 29
- Location:
  Spartan Stadium
  East Lansing, MI
- Game start: 3:30 p.m. EDT
- Elapsed time: 3:12
- Game attendance: 76,705
- Game weather: 69 °F (21 °C), Wind 7 mph (11 km/h) NNW, Partly Cloudy
- Referee: John O'Neill
- TV announcers (ABC):
  Brent Musburger (Play-by-Play)
  Kirk Herbstreit (Analyst)
  Heather Cox (Sideline)

Scoring summary
1	12:09	Ohio State	Jordan Hall 1-yard run (Drew Basil kick)	Ohio State 7–0
1	8:23	Michigan State	Dan Conroy 34-yard field goal	Ohio State 7–3
3	11:04	Michigan State	Dan Conroy 50-yard field goal	Ohio State 7–6
3	6:08	Ohio State	Drew Basil 26-yard field goal	Ohio State 10–6
3	4:49	Michigan State	Keith Mumphery 29-yard pass from Andrew Maxwell (Dan Conroy kick)	Michigan State 13–10
3	3:05	Ohio State	Devin Smith 63-yard pass from Braxton Miller (Drew Basil kick)	Ohio State 17–10
4	7:07	Michigan State	Dan Conroy 48-yard field goal	Ohio State 17–16

Michigan State played host to undefeated Ohio State, who were looking for revenge for last year's loss. The Buckeyes marched down the field on their opening drive and scored to take a 7–0 lead. Michigan State struck back with a Dan Conroy field goal to make it 7–3 early in the first quarter. Ohio State blocked a punt later in the 2nd quarter, but it proved to be in vain as Braxton Miller threw an interception afterwards. The rest of the 2nd quarter was a defense battle, with no one scoring and Michigan State kicker Dan Conroy missing a field goal, which proved to be the deciding points. Michigan State kicked another field early in the 3rd quarter to make it 7–6. Ohio State made a nice drive afterwards but would eventually settle for a Drew Basil field goal to make it 10–6. Later in the 3rd, Andrew Maxwell passed to Keith Mumphrey on a play action pass in which Mumphrey plowed through four OSU defenders to give the Spartans a 13–10 lead, their first of the game. Ohio State would reply with a throw to Devin Smith for a 63-yard touchdown to give the Buckeyes a 17–13 lead. Michigan State would later kick a field goal to make it 17–16, after taking over the ball on a Braxton Miller fumble. The referees initially ruled Miller down, and, in doing so, denied the Spartans what looked to be a probable touchdown. Ohio State would eventually run the clock out to give Urban Meyer his first Big Ten win.

=== Indiana ===
Michigan State at Indiana
(Old Brass Spittoon)

Team	1	2	3	4	Total
• Michigan State	0	14	3	14	31
Indiana	17	10	0	0	27

- Date: October 6
- Location:
  Memorial Stadium
  Bloomington, IN
- Game start: 12:00 p.m. EDT
- Elapsed time: 3:32
- Game attendance: 45,979
- Game weather: 46 °F (8 °C), Wind 8 mph (13 km/h), Partly Cloudy
- Referee: Dan Capron
- TV announcers (BTN):
  Kevin Kugler (Play-by-Play)
  Chris Martin (Analyst)
  Jon Jansen (Sideline)

The Spartans, who won the previous meeting by 52 points, entered the game as 14.5 point favorites. However, the Hoosiers took a 7–0 lead on a 75-yard opening drive, and were up 17–0 with two minutes remaining in the first quarter, having limited MSU to no first downs. The Spartans immediately responded with a 75-yard touchdown drive, forcing an Indiana three-and-out, and a 65-yard touchdown drive, bringing the score back to 17–14. Indiana countered with their own 75-yard touchdown drive, capped off by a 16-yard touchdown pass. A Michigan State penalty after the score allowed the Hoosiers to kick off from the 50-yard line. They surprised the Spartans with an onside kick, and took over at the Michigan State 34. After a deep throw was broken up by a defensive pass interference, the Hoosiers were moved into MSU's red zone. A 14-yard completion to the 6-yard line put the Hoosiers in prime position to add another seven points, but the Spartans made a goal line stand, only allowing Indiana to get a field goal. The Spartans ensuing drive was a three-and-out, but they punted to Indiana's 6-yard line. With only 29 seconds left, Indiana ran a two-yard run play and let the clock run out on the half. At half time, the score was Michigan State 14, Indiana 27.

Michigan State received the opening kick off of the second half, which went out of bounds. The Spartans were able to advance to Indiana's 29-yard line, but their drive ended with a 46-yard field goal. The rest of the quarter was a defensive struggle; Michigan State only had one more first down, while Indiana had two (one off a penalty). The Spartans gained the ball at their own 29-yard line with 14:10 remaining in the fourth quarter, and launched a 6-minute and 21 second touchdown drive. Three incomplete passes by Hoosier quarterback Cameron Coffman led Indiana to punt. The Spartans took over the ball on their own 49-yard line with 7:29 remaining. With an incomplete pass, a 15-yard run, and a 36-yard touchdown pass, the Spartans took a 31–27 lead with 6:35 remaining. While the Hoosiers were limited to a three-and-out, the ensuing punt was fumbled by Spartan returner Nick Hill. He was able to recover it, however, and in the scrum that followed the fumble, Indiana TE Ted Bolser was ejected. The Spartans were at the 50-yard line with 5:59 remaining, but they ran the ball and let the clock wind down. They were able to get three first downs, the last of which needed to be measured with the chains. With 28 seconds remaining, MSU ran for 1 yard on fourth down, securing the victory.

While the Spartans gave up almost 300 yards in the first half, they held Indiana to only 37 yards in the second. Spartan quarterback Andrew Maxwell threw for 290 yards, while Coffman threw for 282. Spartan running back Le'Veon Bell ran for 121 yards and 2 touchdowns, freshman Spartan receiver Aaron Burbridge caught 8 passes for 134 yards, and Shane Wynn led the Hoosiers with 12 receptions for 70 yards and a touchdown. The Spartans gave up 115 yards of penalties to Indiana's 36, but still outgained the Hoosiers in net yards, 410 to 317. Neither team committed a turnover, although both teams fumbled and recovered. The Old Brass Spittoon stuck with Michigan State, who last lost to Indiana in 2006. This game was Indiana's Homecoming game. With the loss, Hoosier coach Kevin Wilson remained without a head coaching victory in Big 10 play.

=== Iowa ===
Iowa at Michigan State

Team	1	2	3	4	OT	2OT	Total
• Iowa	0	3	0	10	3	3	19
Michigan State	7	3	0	3	3	0	16

- Date: October 13
- Location:
  Spartan Stadium
  East Lansing, MI
- Game start: 12:01 p.m. EDT
- Elapsed time: 3:39
- Game attendance: 70,211
- Game weather: 40 °F (4 °C), Wind 9 mph (14 km/h) SSE, Rain
- Referee: Todd Geerlings
- TV announcers (ESPN):
  Dave Pasch(Play-by-Play)
  Brian Griese (Analyst)
  Jenn Brown (Sideline)

Scoring summary
1	11:11	Michigan State	Le'Veon Bell 14-yard run (Dan Conroy kick)	Michigan State 7–0
2	9:13	Michigan State	Dan Conroy 24-yard field goal	Michigan State 10–0
2	4:09	Iowa	Mike Meyer 23-yard field goal	Michigan State 10–3
4	14:08	Iowa	Mike Meyer 28-yard field goal	Michigan State 10–6
4	7:41	Michigan State	Dan Conroy 22-yard field goal	Michigan State 13–6
4	0:55	Iowa	Mark Weisman 5-yard run (Mike Meyer kick)	13–13
OT		Michigan State	Dan Conroy 24-yard field goal	Michigan State 16–13
OT		Iowa	Mike Meyer 27-yard field goal	16–16
OT		Iowa	Mike Meyer 42-yard field goal	{{{Score}}}

Michigan State begins a brutal 4-game stretch of Iowa, Michigan, Wisconsin, and Nebraska at home against the Hawkeyes in a series that has consistently featured tight games. In the previous meeting, Michigan State dominated Iowa in Kinnick Stadium, avenging the Spartans' blowout in the same stadium in the 2010 game. Coming into the game, Iowa was undefeated in Big 10 play, but had lost to mutual opponent Central Michigan University. The Iowa offensive line came into the game having not surrendered a sack since the first game of the season. The day of the game brought a steady downpour and 40 degree temperatures to East Lansing.

The first quarter opened up with a Michigan State kickoff. However, the Hawkeyes turned it over on an interception five plays into the drive, and the Spartans ran the ball in with four consecutive runs by Le'Veon Bell, putting the Spartans up 7–0. The rest of the quarter consisted of the two teams exchanging punts, with neither team earning a first down again until the Spartans did so on the last play of the quarter. The Spartans drove to Iowa's 7-yard line on their next possession, but opted to kick a field goal on a 4th and 1. On the ensuing kickoff, Iowa Junior Jordan Cotton returned the ball for an 82-yard touchdown; however, a block in the back penalty committed against Michigan State's punter resulted in the ball being placed at the Michigan State 47. The Hawkeye drive did make it to the MSU red zone, but a goal line stand forced Iowa to settle for a field goal. On a last minute drive, the Spartans were sent into confusion as they had a first down with 7 seconds remaining; parts of the kicking team and the offense ran on the field, and Spartan quarterback Andrew Maxwell ran off. With no one under center to take the snap, the remaining seconds of the half ticked away.

During half time, the rain came to a stop. However, the game continued to remain a defensive struggle. The Spartans received the kick, advanced five yards in three plays, and punted. Iowa managed a first down, but also punted after gaining 14 yards. The Spartans gained 9 yards and punted, the Hawkeyes 7 before punting, and then the Spartans had a 4 play, 36-yard drive that resulted in a punt. Iowa took over on their 14-yard line, and advanced 66 yards—including converting on 4th and one—but had to settle for a field goal after again being stopped in the red zone. The Spartans' ensuing drive appeared to be stopped at their own 20 until Keith Mumphery was able to pull down a 37-yard pass in double coverage on third down. The Spartans converted another third down three plays later and drove into the Hawkeyes' red zone. Iowa's defense held strong, and the Spartans were forced to kick a field goal. At this point, the rain began to return to the stadium. After trading punts, the Hawkeyes took over on their 33-yard line. However, a 15-yard penalty for tripping and a two-yard loss put them at 2nd and 26. Keenan Davis made a 35-yard catch to save the Hawkyeyes, and Mark Weisman converted on 3rd and 6 with a 37-yard rush to put the Hawkeyes into the Spartan red zone. Weisman then made a five-yard run to equalize the score. The Spartans were unable to score in the remaining 55 seconds, sending the game to overtime.

Iowa won the coin toss, and elected to defend first. The Spartans made it to the seven-yard line, but were forced to kick a field goal. On Iowa's possession, they converted a third down, but a bobbled catch in the endzone on their second third down led to a Hawkeye field goal. The Hawkeyes, who started the second overtime on offense, were held to a field goal. However, on the Spartans' second play of their second possession, a tipped pass to Mumphrey was intercepted, ending the game with an Iowa victory.

=== Michigan ===
Michigan State at Michigan
(Paul Bunyan Trophy)

Team	1	2	3	4	Total
Michigan State	0	0	7	3	10
• #23 Michigan	0	6	0	6	12

- Date: October 20
- Location:
  Michigan Stadium
  Ann Arbor, MI
- Game start: 3:31 p.m. EDT
- Elapsed time: 3:12
- Game attendance: 113,833
- Game weather: 55 °F (13 °C), Wind 15 mph (24 km/h) W, Cloudy
- Referee: Dave Witvoet
- TV announcers (BTN):
  Matt Devlin (Play-by-Play)
  Glen Mason (Analyst)
  J Leman (Sideline)

Scoring summary
2	10:20	MICH	Brendan Gibbons 24-yard field goal	MICH 3–0
2	1:07	MICH	Matt Wile 48-yard field goal	MICH 6–0
3	7:19	MSU	Paul Lang 2-yard pass from Andrew Maxwell (Dan Conroy kick)	MSU 7–6
4	13:37	MICH	Brendan Gibbons 21-yard field goal	MICH 9–7
4	5:48	MSU	Dan Conroy 19-yard field goal	MSU 10–9
4	:05	MICH	Brendan Gibbons 38-yard field goal	MICH 12–10

The Michigan Wolverines defeated the Spartans in the Big House 12–10 to win back the Paul Bunyan Trophy. The score was 6–0 UM at the end of the first half from two field goals. MSU quickly scored a touchdown in their first possession of the second half to go up 7–6. Michigan kicked a third field goal in the mid third quarter to go up 9–7. It appeared that Michigan had MSU stopped towards the end of the fourth by forcing them into a fourth and 9 on their own 30, however the Spartans ran a fake punt and advanced the ball almost to midfield on their way to scoring three more points to go up 10–9. Michigan got the ball back and drove all the way into MSU territory only to be stopped and punt the ball away with 4 minutes left. The Michigan defense held MSU to a three-and-out and they got the ball back at their own 39 with 2:11 left. UM advanced the ball all the way to MSU's 25-yard line and with 5 seconds left they spiked the ball. Brendan Gibbons lined up to kick the game-winning field goal and was iced by MSU Head Coach Mark Dantonio. Gibbons lined back up and split the uprights to win the game for Michigan, 12–10. Michigan won without ever crossing the goal line.

=== Wisconsin ===
Michigan State at Wisconsin

Team	1	2	3	4	OT	Total
• Michigan State	3	0	0	7	6	16
#25 Wisconsin	7	0	0	3	3	13

- Date: October 27
- Location:
  Camp Randall Stadium
  Madison, WI
- Game start: 3:35 p.m. EDT
- Elapsed time: 3:10
- Game attendance: 80,538
- Game weather: 44 °F (7 °C), Wind 12 mph (19 km/h) NNW, Sunny
- Referee: John O'Neill
- TV announcers (ABC / ESPN2):
  Mike Patrick (Play-by-Play)
  Ed Cunningham (Analyst)
  Jeannine Edwards (Sideline)

In game 3 of the Big Ten stretch, the Spartans travelled to Madison aiming to win their 3rd straight regular season matchup. The rivalry has featured games over the past few seasons, such as the Hail Mary victory for MSU in the 2011 regular season matchup, the inaugural Big Ten Championship game won by Wisconsin, and the 2008 matchup that was won on a game-winning field goal by former MSU kicker Brett Swenson.

The game would start with both teams trading punts off their first offensive series. Wisconsin quarterback Joel Stave finally struck first with a 31-yard touchdown pass to Jacob Peterson with 13:44 remaining in the 2nd quarter. The Spartans would respond with only a 34-yard field goal. MSU failed to capitalize on a blocked punt on Wisconsin's own 11 yard line thanks to a holding penalty, a false start penalty, and an 8-yard sack of Andrew Maxwell pushing them back to the Wisconsin 34-yard line. Both teams would start the second half by punting a combined 9 times before MSU lost a fumble to Wisconsin on the MSU 18-yard line. Wisconsin would kick a field goal to go up 10–7 with 6:06 remaining in the 4th quarter. Andrew Maxwell engineered a 12 play scoring drive tying the game at 10–10, going 8/9 for 69-yards and a TD pass to Le'Veon Bell with 1:08 remaining. Wisconsin then stalled at their own 42-yard line, forcing overtime. Danny O'Brien, who replaced Joel Stave at quarterback for Wisconsin after a sack by William Gholston early in the 3rd, could not reach the endzone and Wisconsin settled for a field goal to start overtime. After Le'Veon Bell moved the MSU offense to the Wisconsin 12-yard line, Andrew Maxwell would face a 3rd and 8 hoping to score or continue the drive. He connected with Bennie Fowler in the endzone to earn the Spartans another victory over the Badgers in Madison. With the win, Michigan State snapped Wisconsin's then 21 home game winning streak.

=== Nebraska ===
Nebraska at Michigan State

Team	1	2	3	4	Total
• #21 Nebraska	7	7	0	14	28
Michigan State	7	7	7	3	24

- Date: November 3
- Location:
  Spartan Stadium
  East Lansing, MI
- Game start: 3:30 p.m. EDT
- Elapsed time: 3:52
- Game attendance: 73,522
- Game weather: 38 °F (3 °C), Wind: ? mph NW, Cloudy
- Referee: Bill LeMonnier
- TV announcers (ABC/ESPN2):
  Sean McDonough (Play-by-Play)
  Chris Spielman (Analyst)
  Quint Kessenich (Sideline)

Michigan State will go for its first win ever against the Cornhuskers at home. The Spartans were blown out last year in Lincoln.

=== Northwestern ===
Northwestern at Michigan State

Team	1	2	3	4	Total
• Northwestern	3	3	14	3	23
Michigan State	2	3	8	7	20

- Date: November 17
- Location:
  Spartan Stadium
  East Lansing, MI
- Game start: 12:01 p.m. EST
- Elapsed time: 3:31
- Game attendance: 75,101
- Game weather: 46 °F (8 °C), Wind 4 mph (6.4 km/h) S, Sunny
- Referee: Todd Geerlings
- TV announcers (ESPN2):
  Bob Wischusen (Play-by-Play)
  Danny Kanell (Analyst)
  Maria Taylor (Sideline)

The Spartans celebrated senior day, but offensive miscues put a damper on the day. Michigan State was twice stopped on the one-yard line, only getting two of a possible 14 points as they recorded a safety following a turnover on downs. An incomplete pass on 4th down from their own 30 ended comeback chances.

=== Minnesota ===
Michigan State at Minnesota

Team	1	2	3	4	Total
• Michigan State	6	7	3	10	26
Minnesota	7	0	3	0	10

- Date: November 24
- Location:
  TCF Stadium
  Minneapolis, MN
- Game start: 3:42 p.m. EST
- Elapsed time: 3:05
- Game attendance: 44,194
- Game weather: 25 °F (−4 °C), Wind 10 mph (16 km/h) SSE, Overcast and Cold
- Referee: Dennis Lipski
- TV announcers (BTN):
  Kevin Kugler (Play-by-Play)
  Glen Mason (Analyst)
  Rebecca Haarlow (Sideline)

MSU traveled to Minneapolis to face legends division foe Minnesota. The Spartans won on the road to even their 2012 record at 6–6, and became eligible for a post-season bowl game.

=== Buffalo Wild Wings Bowl ===
Team	1	2	3	4	Total
TCU	7	6	0	3	16
• Michigan St	0	0	7	10	17

- Date: December 29
- Location: Sun Devil Stadium
- Game start: 10:25 p.m. EST
- Elapsed time: 3:18
- Game attendance: 28,999
- Game weather: Clear; 53 °F (12 °C)
- Referee: Jack Folliard
- TV announcers (ESPN):
  Brad Nessler (Play-by-Play)
  Todd Blackledge (Analyst)
  Holly Rowe (Sideline)

Scoring summary
Q1	5:45	TCU	Tucker 4 yard run (Oberkrom kick)	TCU 7–0
Q2	13:25	TCU	Oberkrom 47 yard field goal	TCU 10–0
Q2	8:18	TCU	Oberkrom 31 yard field goal	TCU 13–0
Q3	0:34	MSU	Burbridge 15 yard pass from Cook (Conroy kick)	TCU 13–7
Q4	7:00	MSU	Bell 4 yard run (Conroy kick)	MSU 14–13
Q4	2:42	TCU	Oberkrom 53 yard field goal	TCU 16–14
Q4	1:01	MSU	Conroy 47 yard field goal	MSU 17–16

The first half of the game was dominated by TCU. After a combined three opening three-and-outs to start, TCU marched 73 yards (the first 20 of which came from MSU Penalties) down the field in nine plays, scoring a touchdown on a 4-yard run by Matthew Tucker. A successful PAT put TCU up 7–0. On TCU's next drive, they had a first down to start the second quarter at the MSU 19-yard line. A five-yard penalty and a nine-yard sack forced TCU's Jaden Oberkrom to kick a 47-yard field goal. MSU played backup quarterback Connor Cook during their next drive, but only gained 16 yards. TCU took over after the punt on their own 4-yard line. Thanks to a 61-yard pass to junior Josh Boyce followed by a 15-yard penalty against the Spartans, Oberkrom was again able to finish the drive with a field goal. With Maxwell playing quarterback again, the Spartans gained 21 yards before punting. On TCU's next possession, Trevone Boykin was intercepted at MSU's 7-yard line. After another three-and-out for MSU, TCU kneeled to run out the time in the half. MSU ended all of its drives in the half with punts. Only three of MSU's seven drives in the first half resulted in a first down, and all were limited to only one each.

Both teams started the second half with drives that earned only one first down. On MSU's second possession of the half, Connor Cook resumed quarterback duties. Starting at their own 10, the Spartans were propelled by Le'Veon Bell, who rushed for 35 yards and passed for another 29. a 15-yard pass from Cook to Aaron Burbridge gave MSU its first points of the night with 43 seconds left in the third quarter. The teams then exchanged two punts each; on MSU's second punt, however, TCU's Skye Dawson fumbled. Spartan RJ Williamson recovered, giving MSU the ball four yards from the opposing end zone. A four-yard rushing touchdown and a successful PAT gave MSU its first lead with 7:00 remaining in the game. Both teams went three-and-out on their ensuing possessions. After a 15-yard penalty on the Spartan punt, the Horned Frogs took over at their own 36 with 4:26 remaining. Sparked by a 27-yard pass to LaDarius Brown, TCU got close enough for Oberkrom to kick a career-long 53-yard field goal. The Spartans responded with a 47-yard field goal from Conroy with 1:01 remaining. The Horned Frogs were unable to get a first down on their next drive, giving the ball—and the win—to MSU with 21 seconds remaining.

TCU quarterback Trevone Boykin ended the game with 201 yards passing and 37 yards rushing, while Spartan quarterbacks Maxwell and Cook threw for 28 and 47 yards, respectively. Spartan tailback Le'Veon Bell ran for 145 yards and a touchdown. TCU recorded three sacks, the Spartans 4. Jason Verret and Kenny Cain led the Horned frogs with 12 tackles each, while William Gholston and Max Bullough had 9 each for the Spartans. Michigan State safety Isaiah Lewis recorded the only interception of the game. Bell and Gholtson earned the honors of offensive and defensive MVPs, respectively.

== Rankings ==
Ranking movements Legend: ██ Increase in ranking ██ Decrease in ranking — = Not ranked RV = Received votes
	Week															
Poll	Pre	1	2	3	4	5	6	7	8	9	10	11	12	13	14	Final
AP	13	11	10	21	20	RV	RV	—	—	—	—	—	—	—	—	—
Coaches	13	11	10	20	18	RV	RV	—	—	—	—	—	—	—	—	—
Harris	Not released						RV	—	—	—	—	—	—	—	—	Not released
BCS	Not released							—	—	—	—	—	—	—	—	Not released

== Roster ==
2012 Michigan State Spartans football team roster
Players
Coaches
Offense

Pos.	#	Name	Class
C	66	Jack Allen	Fr
WR	5	Deanthony Arnett	So
QB	12	Peter Badovinac	Sr
WR	87	Tres Barksdale	Fr
RB	24	Le'Veon Bell	Jr
FB	45	Jeff Bobek	Sr
OL	57	Adam Brown	Fr
WR	16	Aaron Burbridge	Fr
OT	70	Skyler Burkland	So
WR	11	Juwan Caesar	Fr
RB	22	Larry Caper	Sr
OL	76	Donavon Clark	Fr
OT	73	Henry Conway	Jr
QB	18	Connor Cook	Fr
OT	74	Jack Conklin	Fr
OT	65	Michael Dennis	So
G	71	John Deyo	Sr
RB	28	Tony Fant	Fr
OT	51	Fou Fonoti	Sr
WR	13	Bennie Fowler	Jr
OT	59	Dan France	Jr
TE	92	Andrew Gleichert	So
G	67	Zach Higgins	Fr
RB	20	Nick Hill	So
TE	84	Derek Hoebing	Jr
G	74	Zach Hueter	Sr
C	63	Travis Jackson (injured)	So
TE	85	Evan Jones	Fr
OL	69	Shawn Kamm	So
WR	4	Kyle Kerrick	Fr
OT	79	Kodi Kieler	Fr
WR	3	MacGarrett Kings	Fr
C	72	Nate Klatt	Jr
OL	52	Connor Kruse	So
TE	83	Paul Lang	Fr
RB/WR	33	Jeremy Langford	So
G	53	Kyle Lints	Fr
WR	88	Monty Madaris	Fr
QB	10	Andrew Maxwell	Jr
G	62	Chris McDonald	Sr
G	75	Benny McGowan	Fr
WR	25	Keith Mumphery	So
WR	17	Kyle Nichol	Jr
QB	7	Tyler O'Connor	Fr
FB	38	Niko Palazeti	So
FB	37	Trevon Pendleton	Fr
TE	82	Josiah Price	Fr
C	68	Ethan Ruhland	Sr
TE	80	Dion Sims	Jr
WR	21	Andre Sims Jr.	Fr
TE	48	Drew Stevens	Sr
RB	32	Nick Tompkins	Fr
C/OG	64	Blake Treadwell	Jr
WR	19	A.J. Troup	Fr
QB	16	Tommy Vento	Fr

Defense

Pos.	#	Name	Class
CB	5	Johnny Adams	Sr
LB	28	Denicos Allen	Jr
LB	52	Nestor Padilla	Sr
LB	30	Riley Bullough	Fr
DE	89	Shilique Calhoun	Fr
DL	87	Brandon Clemons	Fr
CB	36	Arjen Colquhoun	Fr
S	7	Demetrious Cox	Fr
DT	65	Doug Curtis	Sr
LB	43	Ed Davis	Fr
CB	31	Darqueze Dennard	Jr
CB	12	Dana Dixon	Jr
DE	52	Denzel Drone	Jr
S	27	Kurtis Drummond	So
DB	39	Jermaine Edmondson	Fr
DB	29	Spencer Elliott	Fr
LB	41	Kyler Elsworth	Jr
DT	96	David Fennell	Fr
S	19	Danny Folino	Jr
DE	55	Corey Freeman	Sr
LB	47	Jeremy Gainer	Jr
LB	50	Steve Gardiner	Sr
LB	2	William Gholston	Jr
LB	42	Ty Hamilton	So
LB	49	TyQuan Hammock	Jr
LB	45	Darien Harris	Fr
DE	92	Joel Heath	Fr
CB	6	Mylan Hicks	So
DE	91	Tyler Hoover	Jr
NT	61	Antonio Jeremiah	Sr
S	23	Jairus Jones	Jr
LB	34	Taiwan Jones	So
DL	81	James Kittredge	So
DE	93	Damon Knox	Fr
DB	35	Chris Laneaux	Fr
CB	33	Jeremy Langford	So
S	9	Isaiah Lewis	Jr
CB	14	Tony Lippett	So
DE/LB	11	Jamal Lyles	Fr
S	29	Mark Meyers	Fr
LB	10	Chris Norman	Sr
NT	60	Micajah Reynolds	Jr
LB	48	Pat Rhomberg	Fr
DB	37	Ezra Robinson	Fr
LB	44	Marcus Rush	So
NT	58	Jordan Sanders	So
DT	97	Mark Scarpinato	Fr
LB	8	Lawrence Thomas	Fr
CB	15	Trae Waynes	Fr
NT	98	Anthony Rashad White	Sr
CB	32	Mitchell White	Sr
S	26	R.J. Williamson	Fr

Special teams

Pos.	#	Name	Class
K	4	Dan Conroy	Sr
LS	51	Steve Moore	Jr
K	17	Kevin Muma	Jr
LS	52	Taybor Pepper	Fr
P	3	Mike Sadler	So

Head coach

- Mark Dantonio

Coordinators/assistant coaches

- Pat Narduzzi – Defensive coordinator
- Dan Roushar – Offensive coordinator
- Harlon Barnett – Secondary
- Ted Gill – Defensive line
- Brad Salem – Running backs/recruiting coordinator
- Terrence Samuel – Wide receivers
- Mark Staten – Offensive line
- Mike Tressel – Linebackers/special teams
- Dave Warner – Quarterbacks
- Rob Harley – Graduate assistant

Legend

- (C) Team captain
- (S) Suspended
- (I) Ineligible
- Injured
- Redshirt

Roster
Last update: November 24, 2014
