= Andrew Maxwell (American football) =

American football player (born 1991)

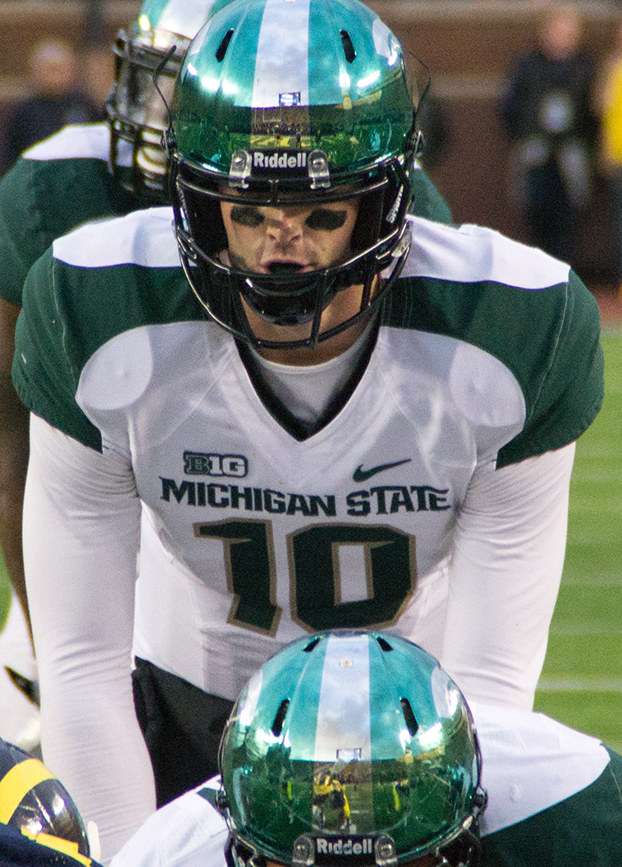
- Maxwell with Michigan State in 2012

No. 10
- Position: Quarterback

Personal information
- Born: January 7, 1991 (age 35)
- Listed height: 6 ft 3 in (1.91 m)
- Listed weight: 212 lb (96 kg)

Career information
- High school: Midland (Midland, Michigan)
- College: Michigan State (2010–2013)
- NFL draft: 2014: undrafted

Andrew Maxwell (born January 7, 1991) is an American former college football player who was a quarterback for the Michigan State Spartans. He was the Spartans starting quarterback in 2012.

== Early life ==
Maxwell attended Midland High School in Midland, Michigan. He was also a letterman in track and field and basketball. Maxwell started for Midland at quarterback as a freshman, sophomore, junior, and senior. As a junior, Maxwell lead the Chemics to the Division 2 state championship game, where they lost to Martin Luther King High School. He finished the season with 2,024 yardsfor 18 touchdowns. Maxwell was invited to attend the ESPN RISE Elite 11 Quarterback Camp. Maxwell committed to Michigan State University on March 2, 2008.

College recruiting
Name	Hometown	School	Height	Weight	40^{‡}	Commit date
Andrew Maxwell; QB	Midland, Michigan	Midland High School	6 ft 3 in (1.91 m)	192 lb (87 kg)	4.9	Mar 2, 2008
Andrew Maxwell; QB	Recruit ratings: Scout: Rivals:					
Overall recruit ranking: Scout: 36 (QB) Rivals: 9 (QB), 4 (MI)
‡ Refers to 40-yard dash; Note: In many cases, Scout, Rivals, 247Sports, On3, and ESPN may conflict in their listings of height, weight and 40 time.; In these cases, the average was taken. ESPN grades are on a 100-point scale.; Sources: "2009 Team Ranking". Rivals.com.

== College career ==
=== Redshirt freshman season ===
In 2009, Maxwell was redshirted. Maxwell did not play a game for the Spartans all season.

=== Freshman season ===
In 2010, Maxwell was the backup to Kirk Cousins. Maxwell played in five games of the season. He had to come in in the Capital One Bowl because Kirk Cousins got hurt with 6:39 left in the 3rd quarter.

=== Sophomore season ===
In 2011, Maxwell was the backup to Kirk Cousins. He played four games of the season. Maxwell came in when the Spartans were blowing out FAU and Central Michigan. He also came in during the game against Indiana.

=== Junior season ===
In 2012, Maxwell became a starting quarterback for the Spartans. He was also named one of the captains of the team. Maxwell started the season with a win against #24 Boise State in a top 25 matchup. He also lead them to an upset win versus #25 Wisconsin. He help Michigan State to get a Buffalo Wild Wings Bowl invite.

=== Senior season ===
In 2013, Maxwell was the backup to Connor Cook. He played three games of the season.

=== College statistics ===
Year	Team	GP	Passing						Rushing			
Year	Team	GP	Comp	Att	Pct	Yds	TD	Int	Att	Yds	Avg	TD
2010	Michigan State	5	11	25	44.0	123	0	0	5	-37	-7.4	0
2011	Michigan State	4	18	26	69.2	171	1	0	5	-2	-0.4	0
2012	Michigan State	13	234	466	52.5	2,606	13	9	37	-106	-2.9	0
2013	Michigan State	4	15	33	45.5	114	0	0	3	13	4.3	0
Career		26	278	530	52.5	3,014	14	9	50	-132	-2.6	0

=== Professional career ===
After being undrafted, Maxwell was invited to try out for the San Diego Chargers. He was not signed to a contract at the conclusion of the rookie minicamp.
