= Connor Cook =

American football player (born 1993)

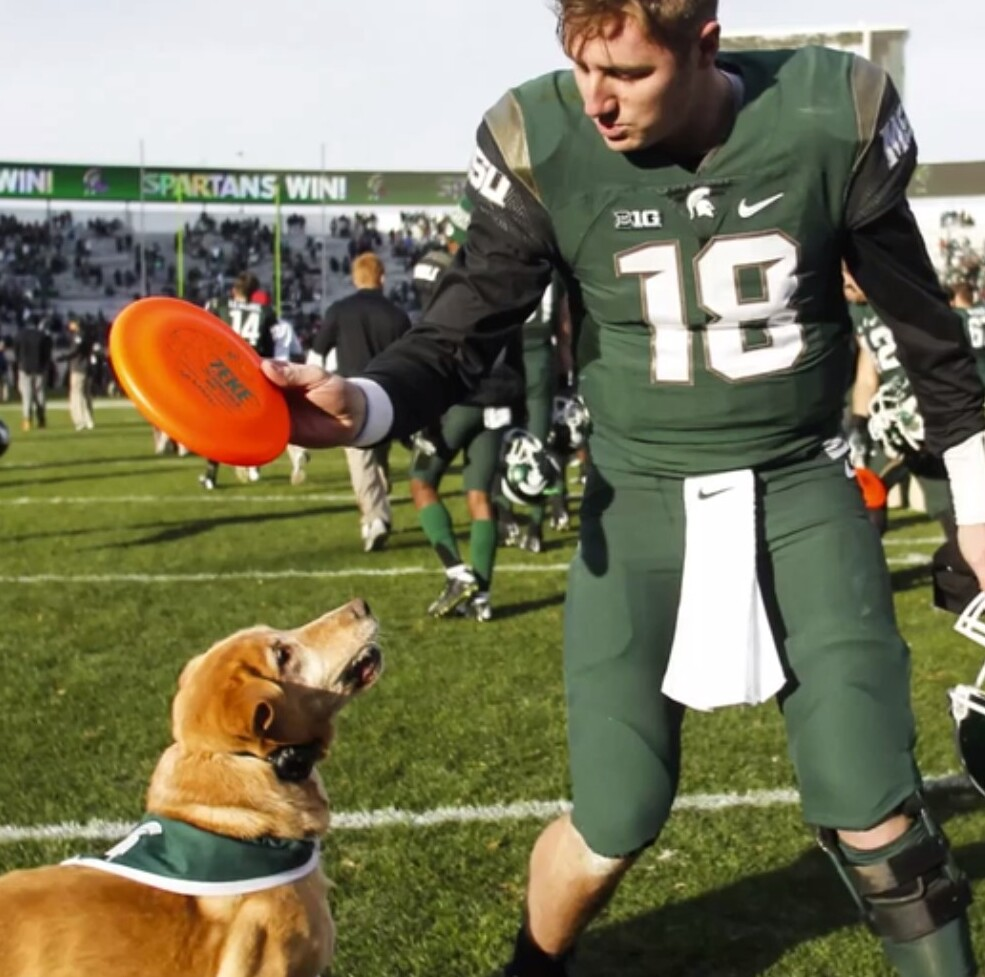
- Cook with Zeke the Wonder Dog

No. 8, 18
- Position: Quarterback

Personal information
- Born: January 29, 1993 (age 33); Parma Heights, Ohio, U.S.
- Listed height: 6 ft 4 in (1.93 m)
- Listed weight: 215 lb (98 kg)

Career information
- High school: Walsh Jesuit (Cuyahoga Falls, Ohio)
- College: Michigan State (2011–2015)
- NFL draft: 2016: 4th round, 100th overall pick

Career history
- Oakland Raiders (2016–2017); Carolina Panthers (2018)*; Cincinnati Bengals (2018)*; Detroit Lions (2019)*; Houston Roughnecks (2020)
- * Offseason or practice squad member only

Awards and highlights
- Johnny Unitas Golden Arm Award (2015); Big Ten Quarterback of the Year (2015); Rose Bowl Offensive MVP (2014); First-team All-Big Ten (2015); 2× Second-team All-Big Ten (2013, 2014)

Career NFL statistics
- Passing attempts: 21
- Passing completions: 14
- Completion percentage: 66.7%
- TD–INT: 1–1
- Passing yards: 150
- Passer rating: 83.4
- Stats at Pro Football Reference

Connor Cook (born January 29, 1993) is an American former professional football player who was a quarterback in the National Football League (NFL) for two seasons with the Oakland Raiders. He played college football for the Michigan State Spartans, winning the Johnny Unitas Golden Arm Award in 2015, and was selected by the Raiders in the fourth round of the 2016 NFL draft.

Cook began his rookie year as the third-string backup, but became Oakland's starter during the postseason due to injuries to Derek Carr and Matt McGloin, making him the first post-merger NFL quarterback to have his first start in a playoff game. After another season as a backup, Cook was released by the Raiders in 2018 and did not have another start. He last played professionally for the Houston Roughnecks of the XFL in 2020.

== Early life ==
Cook was born in Parma Heights, Ohio, on January 29, 1993. Cook is from an athletic family: his father, Chris, played football at Indiana; his mother, Donna, played basketball at Cincinnati; and his older sister, Jackie, played basketball at Old Dominion. Cook attended Walsh Jesuit High School in Cuyahoga Falls, Ohio. He was ranked as the nation's 13th best quarterback recruit by Rivals.com.

== College career ==
Upon enrolling at Michigan State University, Cook was redshirted as a freshman in 2011. He spent the 2012 season as a backup to Andrew Maxwell. After Maxwell was benched, Cook helped lead the team to a win in the 2012 Buffalo Wild Wings Bowl, completing four of 11 passes for 47 yards and a touchdown. Overall, he appeared in three games, completing nine of 17 passes for 94 yards with a touchdown and an interception.

Cook entered the 2013 season as the backup to Maxwell again. After Maxwell struggled, Cook took over as the starter after the first game and remained the starter the rest of the year. He led Michigan State to a 34–24 victory over the Ohio State Buckeyes in the Big Ten Championship Game and was named MVP after throwing for 304 yards with three touchdowns. Cook then led the Spartans to a 24–20 victory over Stanford in the 2014 Rose Bowl. He was named the offensive MVP after throwing for 332 yards and two touchdowns. Cook finished the season with 2,755 passing yards, 22 touchdowns, and six interceptions.

As a junior in 2014, Cook threw for 3,214 yards, 24 touchdowns, and eight interceptions. He led the Spartans to the 2015 Cotton Bowl, where they narrowly defeated the higher-ranked Baylor Bears, 42–41.

As a senior in 2015 Cook led the Spartans to a 16–13 victory over the Iowa Hawkeyes in the Big Ten Championship Game and was named MVP for the second time in three years. The victory in that Big Ten Championship Game earned them a spot in the College Football Playoff (2015 Cotton Bowl), where they lost to the Alabama Crimson Tide, 38–0. Cook finished the season with 3,131 passing yards, 24 touchdowns, and seven interceptions. He won the 2015 Johnny Unitas Golden Arm Award as the nation's outstanding senior or fourth year quarterback. For his career, Cook completed 673 of 1,170 passes for a school record 9,194 yards with 71 touchdowns and 22 interceptions.

== Professional career ==
Pre-draft measurables
Height	Weight	Arm length	Hand span	40-yard dash	10-yard split	20-yard split	20-yard shuttle	Three-cone drill	Vertical jump	Broad jump	Wonderlic
6 ft 4 in (1.93 m)	217 lb (98 kg)	33 in (0.84 m)	9 3/4 in (0.25 m)	4.79 s	1.68 s	2.79 s	4.28 s	7.21 s	33 in (0.84 m)	9 ft 5 in (2.87 m)	25
All values from NFL Combine

=== Oakland Raiders ===
==== 2016 season ====
Cook was drafted by the Oakland Raiders in the fourth round (100th overall) in the 2016 NFL draft. He was the seventh quarterback chosen in the draft. On May 9, 2016, the Raiders signed Cook to a four-year, $2.95 million contract with a signing bonus of $619,890.

Cook began his rookie year as the third-string quarterback on the depth chart behind starter Derek Carr and second-stringer Matt McGloin. On December 24, 2016, Cook was promoted to backup quarterback after Carr suffered a season-ending leg injury. A week later, Cook made his NFL debut, entering the game late in the first half after McGloin suffered a shoulder injury. He played for the remainder of the game. In the third quarter, Cook threw his first NFL touchdown, a 32-yard pass to wide receiver Amari Cooper. Cook finished the 24–6 road loss to the Denver Broncos completing 14 of 21 passes for 150 yards, a touchdown, and an interception.

On January 4, Cook was named the starter for the Wild Card Round against the Houston Texans. McGloin was limited in practice due to his injury but was still active as Cook's backup for the playoff game. Cook became the first quarterback in the Super Bowl era to make his first career start in a playoff game. Cook finished the 27–14 road loss completing 18 of 45 passes for 161 yards, a touchdown, and three interceptions.

==== 2017 season ====
Cook saw no action in 2017 as the third-string quarterback behind Carr and new second-stringer EJ Manuel. Cook was only active for one game the whole season.

On September 1, 2018, Cook was released after the Raiders traded for A. J. McCarron.

=== Carolina Panthers ===
On September 6, 2018, Cook was signed to the practice squad of the Carolina Panthers. He was released on October 9.

=== Cincinnati Bengals ===
Cook was signed by the Cincinnati Bengals to their practice squad on November 5, 2018.

=== Detroit Lions ===
On January 1, 2019, Cook signed a reserve/future contract with the Detroit Lions. In June 2019, he was released after the team signed David Fales.

=== Houston Roughnecks ===
Cook was selected by the Houston Roughnecks of the XFL in the first round with the second pick of the 2020 XFL draft. However, Cook lost the quarterback competition to assigned player P.J. Walker and assumed the backup position. Cook had his contract terminated when the league suspended operations on April 10, 2020.

== Career statistics ==
=== NFL ===
==== Regular season ====
Year	Team	Games		Passing									Rushing					Sacks		Fumbles	
Year	Team	GP	GS	Cmp	Att	Pct	Yds	Y/A	Lng	TD	Int	Rtg	Att	Yds	Avg	Lng	TD	Sck	SckY	Fum	Lost
2016	OAK	1	0	14	21	66.7	150	7.1	32T	1	1	83.4	0	0	0.0	0	0	2	7	2	1
Career		1	0	14	21	66.7	150	7.1	32T	1	1	83.4	0	0	0.0	0	0	2	7	2	1

==== Postseason ====
Year	Team	Games		Passing									Rushing					Sacks		Fumbles	
Year	Team	GP	GS	Cmp	Att	Pct	Yds	Y/A	Lng	TD	Int	Rtg	Att	Yds	Avg	Lng	TD	Sck	SckY	Fum	Lost
2016	OAK	1	1	18	45	40.0	161	3.6	20	1	3	30.0	0	0	0.0	0	0	3	22	0	0
Career		1	1	18	45	40.0	161	3.6	20	1	3	30.0	0	0	0.0	0	0	3	22	0	0

=== College ===
Season	Team	Games			Passing								Rushing			
Season	Team	GP	GS	Record	Cmp	Att	Pct	Yds	Avg	TD	Int	Rtg	Att	Yds	Avg	TD
2012	Michigan State	3	0	0−0	9	17	52.9	94	5.5	1	1	107.0	4	−3	−0.8	0
2013	Michigan State	14	13	12−1	223	380	58.7	2,755	7.3	22	6	135.5	69	76	1.1	1
2014	Michigan State	13	13	11−2	212	365	58.1	3,214	8.8	24	8	149.4	51	80	1.5	2
2015	Michigan State	13	13	11−2	229	408	56.1	3,131	7.7	24	7	136.6	52	56	1.1	0
Totals		43	39	34−5	673	1,170	57.5	9,194	7.9	71	22	139.8	176	209	1.2	3
