= William Gholston =

American football player (born 1991)

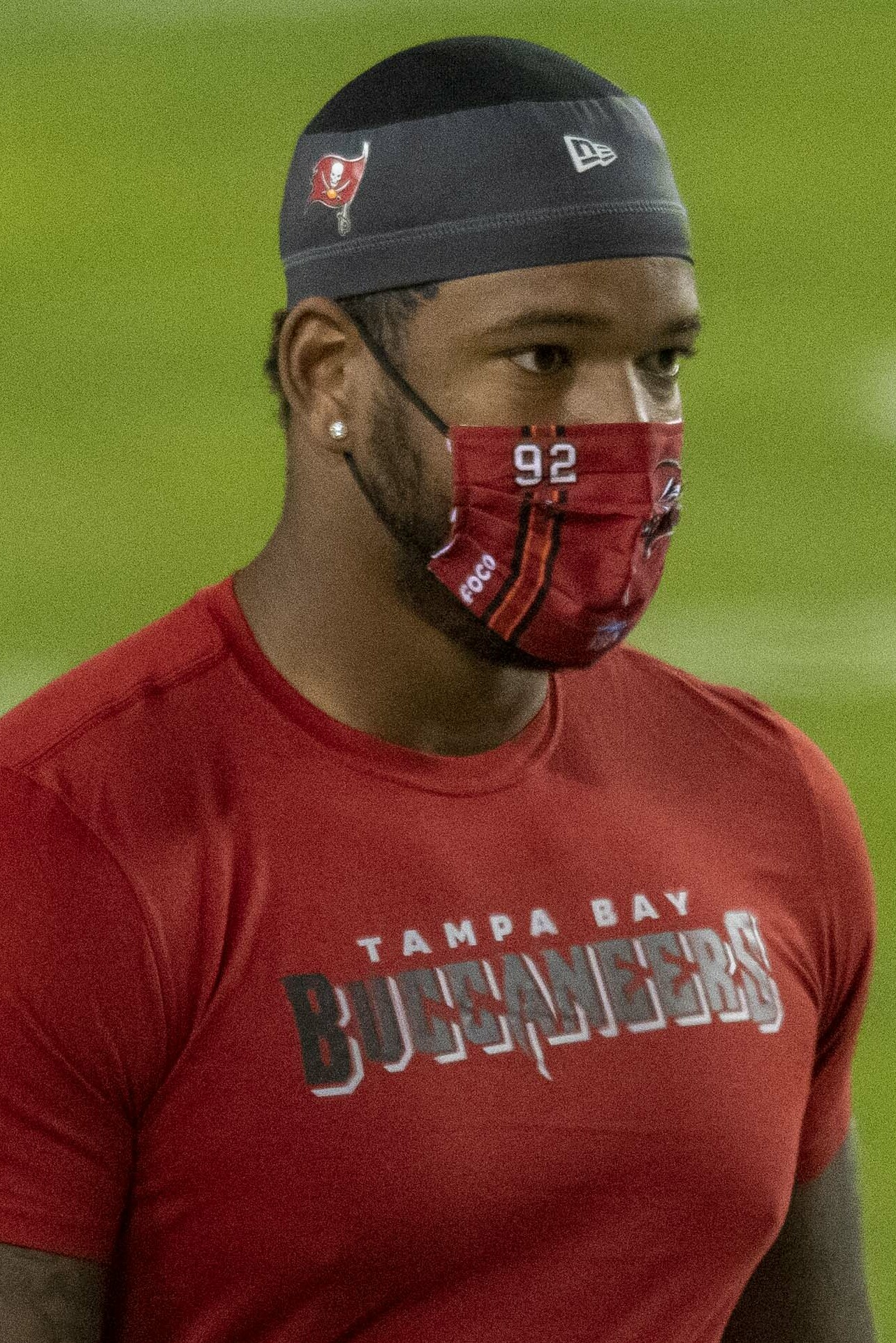
- Gholston with the Tampa Bay Buccaneers in 2021

Profile
- Position: Defensive end

Personal information
- Born: July 31, 1991 (age 35); Detroit, Michigan, U.S.
- Listed height: 6 ft 6 in (1.98 m)
- Listed weight: 281 lb (127 kg)

Career information
- High school: Southeastern (Detroit)
- College: Michigan State (2010–2012)
- NFL draft: 2013: 4th round, 126th overall pick

Career history
- Tampa Bay Buccaneers (2013–2024)

Awards and highlights
- Super Bowl champion (LV); 2× Second-team All-Big Ten (2011, 2012); Buffalo Wild Wings Bowl Defensive MVP (2012)

Career NFL statistics as of Week 6, 2024
- Total tackles: 427
- Sacks: 20.5
- Forced fumbles: 3
- Fumble recoveries: 3
- Pass deflections: 14
- Interceptions: 1
- Stats at Pro Football Reference

William Gholston (born July 31, 1991) is an American former professional football player who was a defensive end for the Tampa Bay Buccaneers of the National Football League (NFL). He played college football for the Michigan State Spartans, and was selected by the Buccaneers in the fourth round of the 2013 NFL draft. He is currently the defensive line coach for the Sickles High School football team.

== Early life ==
A native of Detroit, Michigan, Gholston attended Mumford High School in Detroit, where he was a USA Today High School All-American in 2008. For his senior year, he transferred to Southeastern High School. He recorded a career-best 115 tackles as a senior, with 44 resulting in losses including 7 sacks, and also forced 10 fumbles and blocked two punts.

Considered a five-star recruit by Rivals.com, he was rated as the third best strong side defensive end in the nation. He accepted a scholarship from Michigan State University over offers from Michigan and Ohio State.

== College career ==
Gholston enrolled in Michigan State University, and played for the Spartans from 2010 to 2012. As a freshman in 2010, he saw action in the first 10 games of the 2010 season before suffering a season-ending shoulder injury against Minnesota. He recorded 13 tackles and five quarterback hurries. In 2011, he became a full-time starter for the Spartans. He led the Spartan defensive linemen with 70 tackles and finished tied for seventh in the Big Ten Conference with 16.0 tackles for loss (50 yards); that total also ranks tied for seventh in MSU single-season history, and he also was tied for 11th in the Big Ten with 5.0 sacks (30 yards). He tied a Spartan-bowl record with 5.0 tackles for loss (16 yards), including a career-best 2.0 sacks (10 yards), in the 33–30 triple overtime win against No. 18 Georgia in the 2012 Outback Bowl, and garnered all-conference second team honours. As a junior in 2012, he led the Spartan defensive linemen and ranked fourth on the team with 59 tackles. He also led the team and ranked eighth in the Big Ten with 13.0 tackles for loss (49 yards), and led the team with 4.5 sacks (24 yards).

== Professional career ==
Pre-draft measurables
| Height | Weight | Arm length | Hand span | 40-yard dash | 10-yard split | 20-yard split | 20-yard shuttle | Three-cone drill | Vertical jump | Broad jump | Bench press |
|---|---|---|---|---|---|---|---|---|---|---|---|
| 6 ft 6 1/4 in (1.99 m) | 281 lb (127 kg) | 34 in (0.86 m) | 10 3/8 in (0.26 m) | 4.96 s | 1.75 s | 2.89 s | 4.59 s | 7.20 s | 28.5 in (0.72 m) | 9 ft 2 in (2.79 m) | 23 reps |
All values from NFL Combine

On January 3, 2013, Gholston announced he would forgo his final year of eligibility and enter the NFL draft. On April 27, 2013, Gholston was selected by the Tampa Bay Buccaneers in the fourth round with the 126th overall pick in the 2013 NFL draft. The Buccaneers previously acquired the pick used to select Gholston from the New England Patriots in a trade that sent Aqib Talib to New England. Gholston signed his contract on May 14, 2013, and his four-year deal is worth $2,560,544; it included a $400,544 signing bonus.

He finished his rookie season in 2013 as a rotational player earning 30 combined tackles (14 solo) and two quarterback sacks.

In 2014, he became the team's starter at left end for the defensive line when an injury to Adrian Clayborn put Clayborn on the IR list ending his season. He eventually lost the starting job to waiver wire pick up Jacquies Smith and was relegated to rotational duties for the remainder of the 2014 season. He finished the year with 41 combined tackles (27 solo) and two quarterback sacks.

Gholston played in all 16 games while starting 11 in 2015. He amassed 67 tackles, three sacks and a forced fumble from his defensive end position. In 2016, he recorded 49 tackles, three sacks, and one forced fumble.

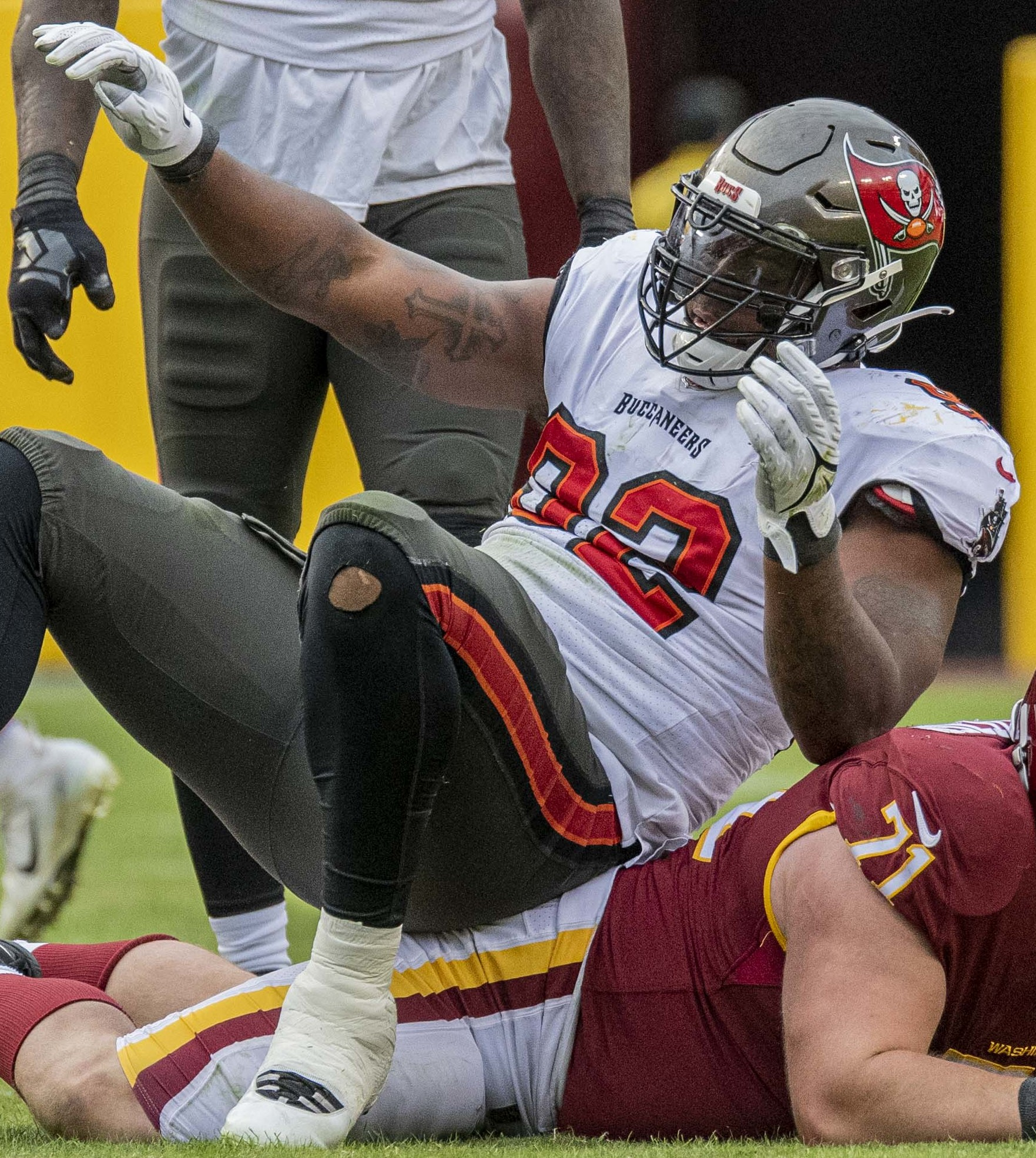
Gholston with the Buccaneers in 2021

On March 6, 2017, Gholston signed a five-year contract extension with the Buccaneers.

Gholston was placed on the reserve/COVID-19 list by the team on November 4, 2020, and activated three days later. Gholston played in all four games in the Buccaneers' playoff run that resulted in the team winning Super Bowl LV.

On March 24, 2022, Gholston re-signed with the Buccaneers. He played in 17 games with nine starts, recording 49 tackles.

Gholston re-signed with the Buccaneers on July 25, 2023.

== NFL career statistics ==
Legend
| **Bold** | Career high |

=== Regular season ===
| Year | Team | Games | | Tackles | | | | | Interceptions | | | | | Fumbles | | | |
| Year | Team | GP | GS | Cmb | Solo | Ast | Sck | TFL | Int | Yds | TD | Lng | PD | FF | FR | Yds | TD |
|---|---|---|---|---|---|---|---|---|---|---|---|---|---|---|---|---|---|
| 2013 | TAM | 12 | 2 | 30 | 14 | 16 | 2.0 | 3 | 0 | 0 | 0 | 0 | **3** | 0 | 0 | 0 | 0 |
| 2014 | TAM | 15 | 9 | 42 | 28 | 14 | 2.0 | **9** | 0 | 0 | 0 | 0 | **3** | 0 | 0 | 0 | 0 |
| 2015 | TAM | 16 | 11 | **67** | **47** | 20 | 3.0 | 8 | 0 | 0 | 0 | 0 | 2 | **2** | 0 | 0 | 0 |
| 2016 | TAM | 14 | 14 | 49 | 37 | 12 | 3.0 | **9** | 0 | 0 | 0 | 0 | 0 | 1 | **1** | 0 | 0 |
| 2017 | TAM | 14 | 10 | 36 | 21 | 15 | 0.0 | 4 | 0 | 0 | 0 | 0 | 0 | 0 | 0 | 0 | 0 |
| 2018 | TAM | 16 | 2 | 10 | 7 | 3 | 1.0 | 1 | 0 | 0 | 0 | 0 | 0 | 0 | 0 | 0 | 0 |
| 2019 | TAM | 16 | 8 | 38 | 26 | 12 | 1.0 | 5 | 0 | 0 | 0 | 0 | 2 | 0 | 0 | 0 | 0 |
| 2020 | TAM | 16 | 12 | 44 | 24 | 20 | 3.0 | 8 | 0 | 0 | 0 | 0 | 2 | 0 | **1** | **1** | 0 |
| 2021 | TAM | 17 | 10 | 36 | 21 | 15 | **4.5** | 7 | 0 | 0 | 0 | 0 | 0 | 0 | 0 | 0 | 0 |
| 2022 | TAM | 17 | 9 | 49 | 24 | **25** | 0.0 | 4 | 0 | 0 | 0 | 0 | 0 | 0 | **1** | 0 | 0 |
| 2023 | TAM | 16 | 1 | 19 | 10 | 9 | 0.0 | 0 | **1** | 0 | 0 | 0 | 2 | 0 | 0 | 0 | 0 |
| Career | | 169 | 88 | 420 | 259 | 161 | 19.5 | 58 | 1 | 0 | 0 | 0 | 14 | 3 | 3 | 1 | 0 |

=== Postseason ===
| Year | Team | Games | | Tackles | | | | | Interceptions | | | | | Fumbles | | | |
| Year | Team | GP | GS | Cmb | Solo | Ast | Sck | TFL | Int | Yds | TD | Lng | PD | FF | FR | Yds | TD |
|---|---|---|---|---|---|---|---|---|---|---|---|---|---|---|---|---|---|
| 2020 | TAM | 4 | 0 | **2** | 1 | **1** | 0.0 | 0 | 0 | 0 | 0 | 0 | 0 | 0 | 0 | 0 | 0 |
| 2021 | TAM | 2 | 1 | **2** | **2** | 0 | 0.0 | **1** | 0 | 0 | 0 | 0 | 0 | 0 | 0 | 0 | 0 |
| 2022 | TAM | 1 | 1 | **2** | **2** | 0 | 0.0 | 0 | 0 | 0 | 0 | 0 | 0 | 0 | 0 | 0 | 0 |
| 2023 | TAM | 2 | 1 | **2** | 1 | **1** | 0.0 | 0 | 0 | 0 | 0 | 0 | 0 | 0 | 0 | 0 | 0 |
| | | 9 | 3 | 8 | 6 | 2 | 0.0 | 1 | 0 | 0 | 0 | 0 | 0 | 0 | 0 | 0 | 0 |

== Coaching Career ==
He is currently the defensive line coach at Sickles High School in Citrus Park, Florida.

== Personal life ==
He is a cousin of former Ohio State Buckeyes defensive end Vernon Gholston.

Just prior to the start of the 2021 NFL season, Gholston started training in Brazilian Jiu-Jitsu under Professor Cassio Cardosi and has used the martial art to help prepare for the season.
