= Max Bullough =

American football player and coach (born 1992)

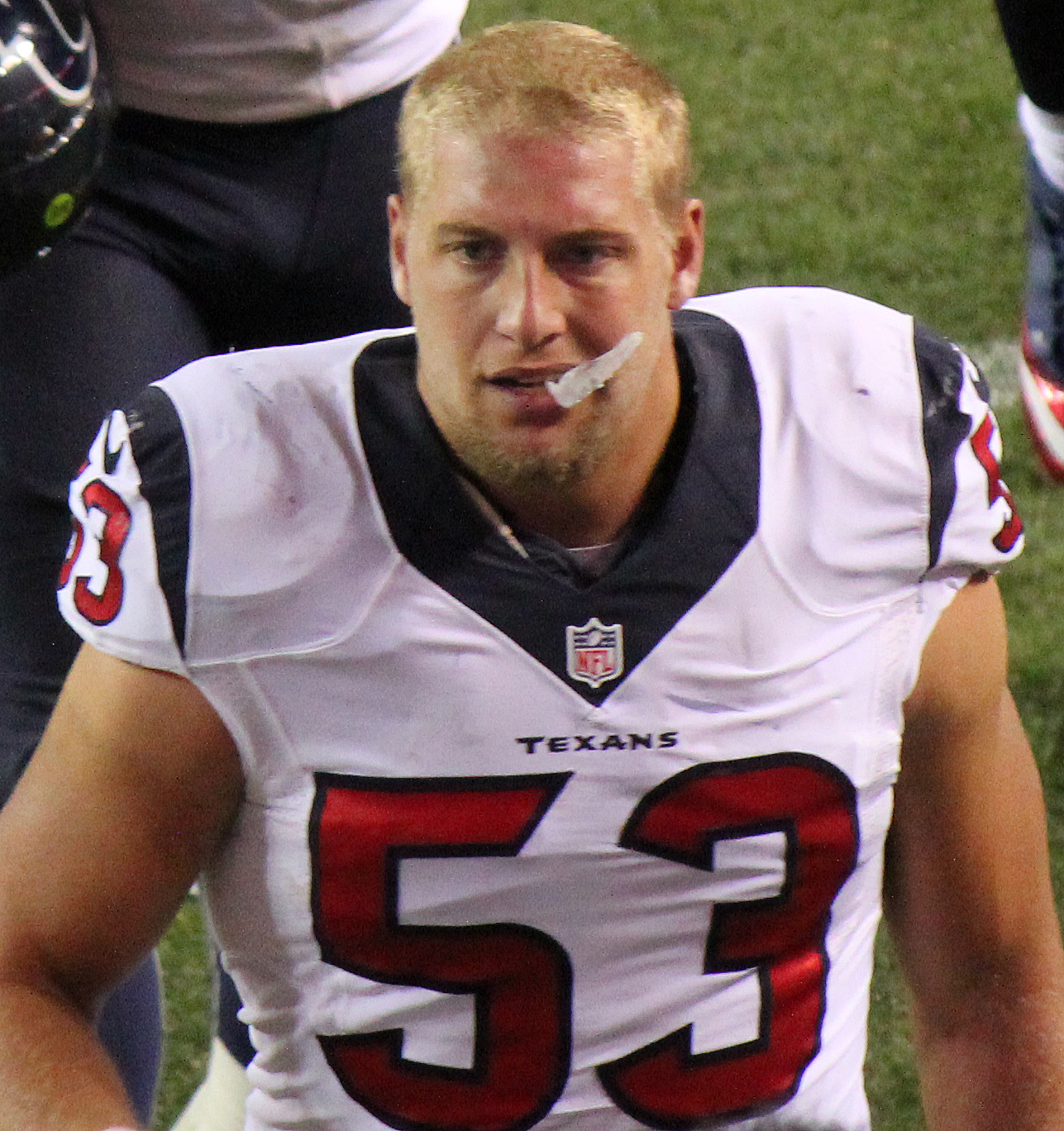
- Bullough with the Houston Texans in 2014

Current position
- Title: Co-defensive coordinator, linebackers coach
- Team: Michigan State
- Conference: Big Ten Conference

Biographical details
- Born: February 11, 1992 (age 34); Traverse City, Michigan, U.S.

Playing career
- 2010–2013: Michigan State
- 2014–2016: Houston Texans
- 2018*: Cleveland Browns
- Position: Linebacker

Coaching career (HC unless noted)
- 2019: Cincinnati (GA)
- 2020–2022: Alabama (GA)
- 2023: Notre Dame (GA)
- 2024–2025: Notre Dame (LB)
- 2026–present: Michigan State (Co-DC/LB)

Accomplishments and honors

Championships
- CFP national champion (2020)

Awards
- First-team All-Big Ten (2012); Second-team All-Big Ten (2011)

Max Levi Bullough (born February 11, 1992) is an American football coach and former linebacker who is the co-defensive coordinator and linebackers coach of the Michigan State Spartans of the Big Ten Conference. He played college football at Michigan State and signed with the Houston Texans of the National Football League (NFL) as an undrafted free agent in 2014. He previously coached for the Notre Dame Fighting Irish.

== Early years ==
Bullough was selected to the MaxPreps All-American second-team. He was ranked 14th best linebacker prospect by SuperPrep and was ranked as the 17th best linebacker by Phil Steele. He was ranked as Michigan's Top 10 seniors by the Detroit Free Press. He was selected as the Division 7 Player of the Year by The Associated Press. He received the Ron Holland Scholar-Athlete Award. He was ranked as nation's 5th best middle linebacker prospect by Scout.com and ranked the 11th best linebacker prospect by Max Emfinger.

== College career ==
Bullough was selected to ESPN.com's Big Ten All-Freshman Team before the season. He finished the season with 23 tackles, half a sack, and an interception.

Bullough was selected to the Second-team All-Big Ten in his sophomore season. He was selected to the CollegeFootballNews.com All-Sophomore second-team following the season. He was named to the CoSIDA Academic All-District V Team and was named to the Academic All-Big Ten.

In 2012, Bullough was selected to the First-team All-Big Ten by coaches. He also was named to the first-team All-Big Ten by Phil Steele and second-team ESPN.com All-Big Ten. He was named an honorable mention All-American by Pro Football Weekly.

In 2013 as a senior, he was named team captain for the second consecutive year and was selected to the first-team All-Big Ten by coaches. He was selected to the NFF Scholar-Athlete of the Year and to the All-America third-team. Bullough finished his last year with 76 tackles, 9.5 for loss

Bullough was suspended for the 2014 Rose Bowl by head coach Mark Dantonio following the 2013 regular season for a violation of team rules. His last game for the Spartans was the 2013 Big Ten Championship when Michigan State beat #2 and undefeated Ohio State to win the Big Ten Championship and a Rose Bowl berth. The Spartans (a 4.5-point underdog) ended up winning the 100th Rose Bowl over Stanford 24–20, capping off one of the best seasons in Michigan State football history.

== Professional career ==
=== Houston Texans ===
On May 16, 2014, Bullough signed with the Houston Texans as an undrafted free agent. After being cut on August 30, 2014, the Houston Texans signed Max Bullough to their practice squad on September 1, 2014, after he went unclaimed. On November 30, 2014, Bullough made his NFL debut against the Tennessee Titans. In the 2015 season, Bullough was promoted to the active roster along with former Michigan State teammate safety Kurtis Drummond. The Texans made Bullough a starter at linebacker for their 2015 game against the Titans.

On May 4, 2017, Bullough was suspended for the first four games of the 2017 season for violating the NFL policy on performance-enhancing substances. On June 2, 2017, he was released by the Texans.

=== Cleveland Browns ===
On January 11, 2018, Bullough signed a reserve/future contract with the Cleveland Browns. He was waived by the Browns on April 12, 2018.

== Coaching career ==
Bullough joined the staff at Cincinnati as a graduate assistant in 2019.

In 2020, Bullough joined the Alabama Crimson Tide football staff as a graduate assistant where he would win the national championship.

== Personal life ==
Bullough's parents are Shane and LeeAnn Bullough. His father Shane was a linebacker at Michigan State from 1983–1986. He has two younger brothers, Riley and Byron, and a younger sister, Holly. Riley has played in the NFL for the Tampa Bay Buccaneers and Tennessee Titans, while Byron also played for the Spartans (2016–2018). Holly ran track and cross country at Michigan State.

Bullough married fiancé Bailee in Traverse City on July 2, 2016; they had been engaged since Christmas Eve in 2015.
