= Johnny Adams (gridiron football) =

American football player (born 1989)

No. 20
- Position: Cornerback

Personal information
- Born: June 9, 1989 (age 37); Akron, Ohio, U.S.
- Listed height: 5 ft 11 in (1.80 m)
- Listed weight: 190 lb (86 kg)

Career information
- High school: Butchtel (Akron)
- College: Michigan State
- NFL draft: 2013: undrafted

Career history
- Houston Texans (2013)*; Indianapolis Colts (2013)*; Buffalo Bills (2013); Oakland Raiders (2013–2014)*; Indianapolis Colts (2014)*; Winnipeg Blue Bombers (2015–2016); Hamilton Tiger-Cats (2016); Edmonton Eskimos (2017–2018)
- * Offseason or practice squad member only

Awards and highlights
- CFL West All-Star (2015); 2× First-team All-Big Ten (2011, 2012); Second-team All-Big Ten (2010)

Career NFL statistics
- Games played: 4
- Stats at Pro Football Reference
- Stats at CFL.ca

Johnny Adams (born June 9, 1989) is an American former professional football player who was a cornerback in the National Football League (NFL) and Canadian Football League (CFL). He played college football for the Michigan State Spartans. He attended Buchtel High School when he was a member of the football, basketball, and track & field teams and succeeded in all three sports.

== Biography ==
- Was a four-year starter at Buchtel High School in Akron, Ohio.
- Earned all-city and team MVP honors as a senior after recording 115 tackles and three interceptions to go along with 1,800 all-purpose yards and 15 touchdowns.
- Earned all-district and all-city first-team honors after intercepting six passes, accounting for 2,200 all-purpose yards and 13 total touchdowns (three on returns).
- Returned nine punts for touchdowns as a sophomore, including three in a game against Central Hower.
- Also participated in basketball and track.
- Earned his bachelor's degree in sociology at Michigan State.
- A native of Akron, Ohio.

== College ==
- Started 39-of-54 career games at Michigan State, finishing with 157 tackles, 35 passes defensed and 11 interceptions.
- Was a three-time All-Big Ten selection (2010–12).
- Ranked fourth in school history in interception return yards (230), fifth in passes defensed (35) and 10th in interceptions (11).
- As a senior in 2012, was a First-team All-Big Ten selection by the league's coaches after starting 12 games, collecting 35 tackles and tying a team-high three interceptions and 10 passes defensed.
- As a junior in 2011, was named First-team All-Big Ten by the league's coaches, finishing with a career-high 51 tackles, nine passes defensed, three interceptions and 3.0 sacks.
- As a sophomore in 2010, earned Second-team All-Big Ten honors by the league's coaches after starting all 13 games and totaling 50 tackles, 10 passes defensed and three interceptions.
- Saw action in 12 games (two starts) as a true freshman in 2008, collecting 21 tackles (15 solo), six passes defensed and two interceptions.

== Professional career ==
=== Houston Texans ===
Adams was signed by the Texans after the 2013 NFL draft as an undrafted member of the team.

=== Indianapolis Colts ===
Adams was signed in August 2013 and waived before the regular season. He returned to the team in June 2014 as a current practice squad member.

=== Buffalo Bills ===
Adams was placed in the practice squad until he moved up in the depth chart due to injuries in the Buffalo Bills roster, he played a total of four games in which he made his professional NFL debut and then were placed back to the practice squad when the players injuries were healed for the rest of time as a Bill. He was a member between early-November 2013 to late-November 2013.

=== Oakland Raiders ===
Adams was on the practice squad as of December 2013 until then waived as of March 2014.

=== Indianapolis Colts ===
Adams was re-signed by the Indianapolis Colts on June 4, 2014, but later waived on August 25, 2014.

=== Winnipeg Blue Bombers ===
Adams signed with the Winnipeg Blue Bombers (CFL) on February 6, 2015. Adams had a very strong first season in the CFL, playing in all 18 regular season games and contributing 64 defensive tackles to go along with 6 interceptions. His efforts resulted in him being named a 2015 CFL West All-Star.

=== Hamilton Tiger-cats ===
On September 28, 2016, the Blue Bombers traded Adams to the Hamilton Tiger-Cats (CFL) for the rights of a negotiation list player. Adams played in 4 games with the Tiger-Cats, totaling 19 tackles. Following the 2016 season he was not re-signed by the Ti-Cats and became a free agent on February 14, 2017.

=== Edmonton Eskimos ===
On March 16, 2017, Adams signed with the Edmonton Eskimos (CFL).
