= 2012 Iowa Hawkeyes football team =

American college football season

2012 Iowa Hawkeyes football
- Conference: Big Ten Conference
- Legends Division
- Record: 4–8 (2–6 Big Ten)
- Head coach: Kirk Ferentz (14th season)
- Offensive coordinator: Greg Davis (1st season)
- Offensive scheme: Multiple
- Defensive coordinator: Phil Parker (1st season)
- Base defense: 4–3
- Home stadium: Kinnick Stadium

2012 Big Ten Conference football standings
	Conf.			Overall
Team	W		L	W		L
Legends Division
No. 25 Nebraska xy	7	–	1	10	–	4
No. 24 Michigan	6	–	2	8	–	5
No. 17 Northwestern	5	–	3	10	–	3
Michigan State	3	–	5	7	–	6
Iowa	2	–	6	4	–	8
Minnesota	2	–	6	6	–	7
Leaders Division
No. 3 Ohio State* x	8	–	0	12	–	0
Penn State*	6	–	2	8	–	4
Wisconsin y$	4	–	4	8	–	6
Purdue	3	–	5	6	–	7
Indiana	2	–	6	4	–	8
Illinois	0	–	8	2	–	10
Championship: Wisconsin 70, Nebraska 31
$ – BCS representative as conference champion; x – Division champion/co-champions; * Ohio State and Penn State ineligible for conference championship game and post-season bowl games due to NCAA sanctions.; Rankings from AP Poll

The 2012 Iowa Hawkeyes football team represented the University of Iowa in the 2012 NCAA Division I FBS football season. They were led by 14th year head coach Kirk Ferentz and play their home games at Kinnick Stadium. They are a member of the Legends Division of the Big Ten Conference. The team finished 2–6 in conference play, 4–8 overall and failed to become bowl-eligible for the first time since 2000.

As of 2026, this remains Iowa's last losing season.

== Schedule ==
Date	Time	Opponent	Site	TV	Result	Attendance
September 1	2:30 pm	vs. Northern Illinois*	Soldier Field; Chicago, IL	ESPNU	W 18–17	52,117
September 8	2:30 pm	Iowa State*	Kinnick Stadium; Iowa City, IA (Cy-Hawk Trophy)	BTN	L 6–9	70,585
September 15	2:30 pm	No. 7 (FCS) Northern Iowa*	Kinnick Stadium; Iowa City, IA	BTN	W 27–16	70,585
September 22	11:00 am	Central Michigan*	Kinnick Stadium; Iowa City, IA	BTN	L 31–32	70,585
September 29	11:00 am	Minnesota^{†}	Kinnick Stadium; Iowa City, IA (Floyd of Rosedale)	ESPN2	W 31–13	70,585
October 13	11:00 am	at Michigan State	Spartan Stadium; East Lansing, MI	ESPN	W 19–16 ^{2OT}	70,211
October 20	7:00 pm	Penn State	Kinnick Stadium; Iowa City, IA	BTN	L 14–38	70,585
October 27	11:00 am	at Northwestern	Ryan Field; Evanston, IL	ESPN2	L 17–28	44,121
November 3	2:30 pm	at Indiana	Memorial Stadium; Bloomington, IN	BTN	L 21–24	40,646
November 10	11:00 am	Purdue	Kinnick Stadium; Iowa City, IA	BTN	L 24–27	70,585
November 17	11:00 am	at No. 23 Michigan	Michigan Stadium; Ann Arbor, MI	ESPN	L 17–42	113,016
November 23	11:00 am	No. 17 Nebraska	Kinnick Stadium; Iowa City, IA (rivalry)	ABC	L 7–13	69,805
*Non-conference game; ^{†}Homecoming; Rankings from AP Poll released prior to the game; All times are in Central time

== Roster ==
2012 Iowa Hawkeyes football team roster
Players
Coaches
Offense

Pos.	#	Name	Class
QB	5	Kyle Anderson	Fr
QB	16	C. J. Beathard	Fr
QB	15	Jake Rudock	Fr
QB	19	Cody Sokol	Jr
QB	16	James Vandenberg (C)	Sr
QB/P	14	John Wienke	Sr
RB	32	Damon Bullock	So
RB	33	Jordan Canzeri (injured)	So
RB	33	Adam Cox	So
RB	31	Andre Dawson	Jr
RB	26	Steve Fiorella	Fr
RB	4	Greg Garmon	Fr
RB	92	Jonathan Gimm	Sr
RB	3	Barkley Hill (injured)	Fr
RB	34	Nate Meier	Fr
RB	35	Matt Mayers	So
RB	41	Jacob Reisen	Jr
RB	38	Brad Rogers	Jr
RB	45	Mark Weisman	So
WR	23	Jordan Cotton	Jr
WR	6	Keenan Davis	Sr
WR	9	Blake Haluska	So
WR	84	Jacob Hillyer	So
WR	88	Greg Mabin	Fr
WR	11	Kevonte Martin-Manley	So
WR	29	Nick Nielsen	Sr
WR	8	Don Shumpert	Jr
WR	81	Tevaun Smith	Fr
WR	83	Steven Staggs	Sr
WR	89	Cameron Wilson	Fr
TE	85	Zach Derby	Sr
TE	87	Jake Duzey	Fr
TE	86	C. J. Fiedorowicz	Jr
TE	82	Ray Hamilton	So
TE	46	George Kittle	Fr
TE	80	Henry Krieger-Coble	Fr
OL	63	Austin Blythe	Fr
OL	59	Conor Boffeli	Jr
OL	50	Drew Clark	Jr
OL	78	Andrew Donnal	So
OL	53	James Ferentz (C)	Sr
OL	57	Tommy Gaul	So
OL	74	Mitch Keppy	Fr
OL	76	Nolan MacMillan	Jr
OL	66	Casey McMillan	Sr
OL	68	Brandon Scherff	So
OL	77	Reid Sealby	Fr
OL	58	Eric Simmons	So
OL	60	Matt Tobin	Sr
OL	70	Brett Van Sloten	Jr
OL	65	Jordan Walsh	Fr
OL	73	Ryan Ward	Fr

Defense

Pos.	#	Name	Class
DL	79	Dominic Alvis	Jr
DL	54	Steve Bigach	Sr
DL	97	Darian Cooper	Fr
DL	71	Carl Davis	So
DL	56	Faith Ekakitie	Fr
DL	99	Joe Gaglione	Sr
DL	98	Mike Hardy	So
DL	67	Jaleel Johnson	Fr
DL	93	Nathan Lyman	Jr
DL	94	Riley McMinn	Fr
DL	95	Drew Ott	Fr
DL	90	Louis Trinca-Pasat	So
DL	75	Dean Tsopanides	Fr
DL	91	Daumantas Venckus-Cucchiara	Fr
LB	52	Quinton Alston	So
LB	55	Marcus Collins	So
LB	17	Shane DiBona	Jr
LB	36	Cole Fisher	So
LB	50	Palmer Foster	So
LB	31	Anthony Hitchens	Jr
LB	20	Christian Kirksey	Jr
LB	44	James Morris (C)	Jr
LB	42	Macon Plewa	Fr
LB	43	Jim Poggi	So
LB	49	Melvin Spears	Fr
LB	51	Laron Taylor	Fr
DB	14	Kevin Buford	Fr
DB	22	Torrey Campbell	So
DB	2	Greg Castillo	Sr
DB	13	Tom Donatell	Sr
DB	7	Sean Draper	Fr
DB	28	Marcus Fleming	Fr
DB	12	Anthony Gair	Fr
DB	17	Raymond Hammond	Fr
DB	18	Micah Hyde (C)	Sr
DB	22	Brian Kroll	So
DB	21	Nico Law	So
DB	25	Ruben Lile (injured)	Fr
DB	27	Jordan Lomax (injured)	So
DB	48	John Lowdermilk	So
DB	19	B.J. Lowery	Jr
DB	5	Tanner Miller	Jr
DB	16	Jamal Overton	Fr
DB	39	Travis Perry	Fr
DB	16	Collin Sleeper	Sr
DB	30	Gavin Smith	So
DB	40	Jack Swanson	Sr

Special teams

Pos.	#	Name	Class
K	1	Marshall Koehn	Fr
K	98	Connor Kornbrath	Fr
K	96	Mike Meyer	Jr
K	8	Trent Mossbrucker	Sr
P	15	Jonny Mullings	So
LS	69	Ryan Kolka	Fr
LS	61	Casey Kreiter	Jr

Head coach

- Kirk Ferentz

Coordinators/assistant coaches

- Greg Davis – Offensive Coordinator and Quarterbacks
- Phil Parker – Defensive Coordinator
- Erik Campbell– Wide Receivers
- Lester Erb– Running Backs and Special Teams
- Brian Ferentz – Offensive Line
- Eric Johnson – Recruiting Coordinator and Tight Ends
- Reese Morgan – Defensive Line
- Darrell Wilson – Defensive Backs and Special Teams
- LeVar Woods – Linebackers
- Chris Doyle – Strength and Conditioning
- Dustyn Baethke – Strength and Conditioning Assistant
- Chad Kraklio – Strength and Conditioning Assistant
- Chris Polizzi – Defensive Graduate Assistant
- David Raih – Offensive Graduate Assistant
- Doug West – Senior Athletic Trainer
- Ned Amendola, M.D. – Director, UI Sports Medicine Center
- Raimond Braithwaite – Strength and Conditioning Assistant
- Chic Ejiasi – Director of Player Development
- Matthew Engelbert – Video Coordinator
- Paul Federici – Director of Football Operations
- Russ Haynes – Associate Director, Athletic Training Services
- Bob Rahfeldt – Assistant Video Coordinator
- Scott Southmayd – Quality Control Director
- John Streif – Assistant Athletic Trainer

Legend

- (C) Team captain
- (S) Suspended
- (I) Ineligible
- Injured
- Redshirt

Roster
Last update: 8/17/12

== Regular season ==
=== Northern Illinois ===
Iowa at Northern Illinois

Team	1	2	3	4	Total
• Iowa	3	3	3	9	18
Northern Illinois	0	10	7	0	17

- Date: September 1
- Location: Soldier Field
  Chicago, IL
- Game start: 2:30 p.m. CDT
- Elapsed time: 3:22
- Game attendance: 52,117
- Game weather: 73 °F (23 °C), Overcast, Wind 10 mph (16 km/h) NE
- Referee: Dave Wilvoet
- TV announcers (ESPNU): Tom Hart, John Congemi
- Source

Scoring summary
1	8:08	Iowa	Mike Meyer 34-yard field goal	Iowa 3–0
2	14:55	Northern Illinois	Keith Harris 7-yard run (Mathew Sims kick)	Northern Illinois 7–3
2	4:23	Iowa	Mike Meyer 29-yard field goal	Northern Illinois 7–6
2	1:16	Northern Illinois	Mathew Sims 28-yard field goal	Northern Illinois 10–6
3	10:59	Iowa	Mike Meyer 22-yard field goal	Northern Illinois 10–9
3	9:43	Northern Illinois	Jordan Lynch 73-yard run (Mathew Sims kick)	Northern Illinois 17–9
4	9:33	Iowa	Mike Meyer 50-yard field goal	Northern Illinois 17–12
4	2:15	Iowa	Damon Bullock 23-yard run (James Vandenburg pass failed)	Iowa 18–17

Iowa held on to win to start the season 1-0.

=== Iowa State ===
Iowa State at Iowa
Cy-Hawk Trophy

Team	1	2	3	4	Total
• Iowa State	6	3	0	0	9
Iowa	3	0	0	3	6

- Date: September 8
- Location: Kinnick Stadium
  Iowa City, IA
- Game start: 2:42 p.m. CDT
- Elapsed time: 3:07
- Game attendance: 70,585
- Game weather: 69 °F (21 °C), Sunny, Wind 7 mph (11 km/h) NNW
- Referee: Tom Walker
- TV announcers (BTN): Kevin Kugler, Chuck Long, Chris Martin, and Jon Jansen
- Source

Scoring summary
1	9:55	Iowa State	Aaron Horne 5-yard pass from Steele Jantz (Edwin Arceo kick failed)	Iowa State 6–0
1	4:49	Iowa	Mike Meyer 23-yard field goal	Iowa State 6–3
2	11:13	Iowa State	Edwin Arceo 22-yard field goal	Iowa State 9–3
4	14:06	Iowa	Mike Meyer 21-yard field goal	Iowa State 9–6

=== Northern Iowa ===
Northern Iowa at Iowa

Team	1	2	3	4	Total
Northern Iowa	7	6	3	0	16
• Iowa	7	10	7	3	27

- Date: September 15
- Location: Kinnick Stadium
  Iowa City, IA
- Game start: 2:42 p.m. CDT
- Elapsed time: 3:16
- Game attendance: 70,585
- Game weather: 76 °F (24 °C), Mostly Sunny, Wind 8 mph (13 km/h) S
- Referee: Todd Ransom
- TV announcers (BTN): Tom Werme, Danan Hughes, and Damon Benning
- Source

Scoring summary
1	10:36	Northern Iowa	David Johnson 1-yard run (Tyler Sievertsen kick)	Northern Iowa 7–0
1	5:25	Iowa	Mark Weisman 1-yard run (Mike Meyer kick)	Tied 7–7
1	2:13	Northern Iowa	Tyler Sievertsen 49-yard field goal	Northern Iowa 10–7
2	11:09	Iowa	Mark Weisman 1-yard run (Mike Meyer kick)	Iowa 14–10
2	7:24	Northern Iowa	Tyler Sievertsen 22-yard field goal	Iowa 14–13
2	2:46	Iowa	Mike Meyer 24-yard field goal	Iowa 17–13
3	13:10	Iowa	Mark Weisman 2-yard run (Mike Meyer kick)	Iowa 24–13
3	2:47	Northern Iowa	Tyler Sievertsen 25-yard field goal	Iowa 24–16
4	12:22	Iowa	Mike Meyer 19-yard field goal	Iowa 27–16

FCS foe Northern Iowa was able to play with the Hawkeyes but couldn't put up enough points to pull off the upset.

=== Central Michigan ===
Central Michigan at Iowa

Team	1	2	3	4	Total
• Central Michigan	10	13	0	9	32
Iowa	14	0	7	10	31

- Date: September 22
- Location: Kinnick Stadium
  Iowa City, IA
- Game start: 11:00 CDT
- Elapsed time: 3:30
- Game attendance: 70,585
- Game weather: 49 °F (9 °C), Mostly Sunny, Wind 21 mph (34 km/h) WNW
- Referee: Shawn Smith
- TV announcers (BTN): Kevin Kugler, Danan Hughes, and Tom Helmer
- Source

Scoring summary
1	12:32	Iowa	Kevonte Martin-Manley 10-yard pass from James Vandenburg (Mike Meyer kick)	Iowa 7–0
1	8:04	Central Michigan	Zurlon Tipton 8-yard run (David Harman kick)	Tied 7–7
1	5:45	Central Michigan	David Harman 33-yard field goal	Central Michigan 10–7
1	3:10	Iowa	Mark Weisman 34-yard run (Mike Meyer kick)	Iowa 14–10
2	11:51	Central Michigan	Titus Davis 29-yard pass from Ryan Radchiff (David Harman kick)	Central Michigan 17–14
2	2:00	Central Michigan	David Harman 25-yard field goal	Central Michigan 20–14
2	0:12	Central Michigan	David Harman 20-yard field goal	Central Michigan 23–14
3	9:18	Iowa	Mark Weisman 5-yard run (Mike Meyer kick)	Central Michigan 23–21
4	8:07	Iowa	Mike Meyer 46-yard field goal	Iowa 24–23
4	2:18	Iowa	Mark Weisman 12-yard run (Mike Meyer kick)	Iowa 31–23
4	0:45	Central Michigan	Titus Davis 13-yard pass from Ryan Radcliff (Ryan Radcliff pass failed)	Iowa 31–29
4	0:03	Central Michigan	David Harman 47-yard field goal	Central Michigan 32–31

=== Minnesota ===
Minnesota at Iowa
Floyd of Rosedale

Team	1	2	3	4	Total
Minnesota	0	0	7	6	13
• Iowa	3	21	0	7	31

- Date: September 29
- Location: Kinnick Stadium
  Iowa City, IA
- Game start: 11:02 a.m. CDT
- Elapsed time: 3:15
- Game attendance: 70,585
- Game weather: 65 °F (18 °C), Sunny, Wind 6 mph (9.7 km/h) WNW
- Referee: Dennis Lipski
- TV announcers (ESPN2): Beth Mowins, Joey Galloway, and Lewis Johnson
- Source

Scoring summary
1	12:35	Iowa	Mike Meyer 44-yard field goal	Iowa 3–0
2	14:55	Iowa	Mark Weisman 8-yard run (Mike Meyer kick)	Iowa 10–0
2	13:03	Iowa	Jordan Cotton 47-yard pass from James Vandenburg (Mike Meyer kick)	Iowa 17–0
2	8:50	Iowa	James Vandenburg 1-yard run (Mike Meyer kick)	Iowa 24–0
3	7:12	Minnesota	Issac Fruechte 9-yard pass from Max Shortell (Jordan Wettstein kick)	Iowa 24–7
4	5:15	Iowa	Christian Kirksey 68-yard interception return (Mike Meyer kick)	Iowa 31–7
4	0:41	Minnesota	Drew Goodger 1-yard pass from Max Shortell (Max Shortell pass failed)	Iowa 31–13

The Hawkeyes had little trouble in this border rivalry game and recaptured the bronze pig.

=== Michigan State ===
Iowa at Michigan State

Team	1	2	3	4	OT	2OT	Total
• Iowa	0	3	0	10	3	3	19
Michigan State	7	3	0	3	3	0	16

- Date: October 13
- Location: Spartan Stadium
  East Lansing, MI
- Game start: 11:00 a.m. CDT
- Elapsed time: 3:39
- Game attendance: 70,211
- Game weather: 40 °F (4 °C), Rain, Wind 9 mph (14 km/h) SSE
- Referee: Todd Geerlings
- TV announcers (ESPN): Dave Pasch, Brian Griese, and Jenn Brown
- Source

Scoring summary
1	11:11	Michigan State	Le'Veon Bell 14-yard run (Dan Conroy kick)	Michigan State 7–0
2	9:13	Michigan State	Dan Conroy 24-yard field goal	Michigan State 10–0
2	4:09	Iowa	Mike Meyer 23-yard field goal	Michigan State 10–3
4	14:08	Iowa	Mike Meyer 28-yard field goal	Michigan State 10–6
4	7:41	Michigan State	Dan Conroy 22-yard field goal	Michigan State 13–6
4	0:55	Iowa	Mark Wesiman 5-yard run (Mike Meyer field goal)	Tied 13–13
OT	0:00	Michigan State	Dan Conroy 24-yard field goal	Michigan State 16–13
OT	0:00	Iowa	Mike Meyer 27-yard field goal	Tied 16–16
2OT	0:00	Iowa	Mike Meyer 42-yard field goal	Iowa 19–16

Iowa benefitted from a lucky interception to escape East Lansing with a double overtime victory.

=== Penn State ===
Penn State vs Iowa

Team	1	2	3	4	Total
• Penn State	14	10	7	7	38
Iowa	0	0	0	14	14

- Date: October 20
- Location: Kinnick Stadium
  Iowa City, IA
- Game start: 7:05 p.m. CDT
- Elapsed time: 3:19
- Game attendance: 70,585
- Game weather: 51 °F (11 °C), Partly Cloudy, Wind 5 mph (8.0 km/h) SSE
- Referee: Dan Capron
- TV announcers (BTN): Eric Collins, Derek Rackley, and Jon Jansen
- Source

Scoring summary
1	7:24	Penn State	Jesse James 31-yard pass from Matt McGloin (Sam Ficken kick)	Penn State 7–0
1	2:43	Penn State	Allen Robinson 8-yard pass from Matt McGloin(Sam Ficken kick)	Penn State 14–0
2	7:19	Penn State	Sam Ficken 34-yard field goal	Penn State 17–0
2	5:53	Penn State	Bill Belton 11-yard run (Sam Ficken kick )	Penn State 24–0
3	14:33	Penn State	Bill Belton 3-yard run (Sam Ficken kick )	Penn State 31–0
4	14:25	Penn State	Bill Belton 5-yard run (Sam Ficken kick)	Penn State 38–0
4	14:14	Iowa	Jordan Cotten 92-yard kickoff return (Mike Meyer kick)	Penn State 38–7
4	4:11	Iowa	Keenan Davis 18-yard pass from James Vandenburg (Mike Meyer kick)	Penn State 38–14

=== Northwestern ===
Iowa at Northwestern

Team	1	2	3	4	Total
Iowa	3	0	7	7	17
• Northwestern	7	7	14	0	28

- Date: October 27
- Location: Ryan Field
  Evanston, IL
- Game start: 11:00 a.m. CDT
- Elapsed time: 3:07
- Game attendance: 44,121
- Game weather: 44 °F (7 °C), Mostly Sunny, Wind 12 mph (19 km/h) NNW
- Referee: Mike Cannon
- TV announcers (ESPN2): Beth Mowins, Joey Galloway, and Lewis Johnson
- Source

Scoring summary
1	11:26	Northwestern	Kain Colter 5-yard run (Jeff Budzien kick)	Northwestern 7–0
1	4:37	Iowa	Mike Meyer 40-yard field goal	Northwestern 7–3
2	11:44	Northwestern	Kain Colter 2-yard run (Jeff Budzien kick)	Northwestern 14–3
3	12:58	Northwestern	Kain Colter 4-yard run (Jeff Budzien kick)	Northwestern 21–3
3	10:43	Northwestern	Christian Jones 47-yard pass from Kain Colter (Jeff Budzien kick)	Northwestern 28–3
3	0:22	Iowa	James Vandenburg 1-yard run (Mike Meyer kick)	Northwestern 28–10
4	6:37	Iowa	James Vandenburg 1-yard run (Mike Meyer kick)	Northwestern 28–17

=== Indiana ===
Iowa at Indiana

Team	1	2	3	4	Total
Iowa	14	0	0	7	21
• Indiana	3	7	7	7	24

- Date: November 3
- Location: Memorial Stadium
  Bloomington, IN
- Game start: 3:42 p.m. CDT
- Elapsed time: 3:08
- Game attendance: 40,646
- Game weather: 43 °F (6 °C), Cloudy, Wind 8 mph (13 km/h) NE (Game delayed 1 hour and 12 minutes)
- Referee: Alex Kemp
- TV announcers (BTN): Eric Collins, Derek Rackley, and J Leman
- Source

Scoring summary
1	7:20	Iowa	Kevonte Martin-Manley 24-yard pass from James Vandenburg (Mike Meyer kick)	Iowa 7–0
1	7:08	Iowa	Christian Kirksey 18-yard interception return (Mike Meyer kick)	Iowa 14–0
1	3:27	Indiana	Mitch Ewald 45-yard field goal	Iowa 14–3
2	0:47	Indiana	Cody Latimer 15-yard pass from Cameron Coffman (Mitch Ewald kick)	Iowa 14–10
3	7:28	Indiana	Cody Latimer 6-yard pass from Cameron Coffman (Mitch Ewald kick)	Indiana 17–14
4	12:17	Iowa	Damon Bullock 4-yard run (Mike Meyer kick)	Iowa 21–17
4	10:58	Iowa	Cody Latimer 30-yard pass from Cameron Coffman (Mitch Ewald kick)	Indiana 24–21

=== Purdue ===
Purdue at Iowa

Team	1	2	3	4	Total
• Purdue	7	7	10	3	27
Iowa	0	7	14	3	24

- Date: November 10
- Location: Kinnick Stadium
  Iowa City, IA
- Game start: 11:00 a.m. CST
- Elapsed time: 3:24
- Game attendance: 70,585
- Game weather: 63 °F (17 °C), Partly Cloudy, Wind 20 mph (32 km/h) S
- Referee: Dave Witvoet
- TV announcers (BTN): Josh Lewin, Chris Martin, and J Leman
- Source

Scoring summary
1	5:30	Purdue	Akeem Shavers 3-yard run(Sam McCartney kick)	Purdue 7–0
2	9:43	Iowa	Damon Bullock 1-yard run (Mike Meyer kick)	Tied 7–7
2	4:43	Purdue	Gabe Holmes 9-yd pass from Robert Marve (Sam McCartney kick)	Purdue 14–7
3	10:23	Purdue	Sam McCartney 36-yd field goal	Purdue 17–7
3	4:58	Iowa	CJ Fiedorowicz 5-yd pass from James Vandenberg (Mike Meyer kick)	Purdue 17–14
3	1:38	Purdue	Gary Bush 10-yd pass from Robert Marve (Sam McCartney kick)	Purdue 24–14
3	0:10	Iowa	Micah Hyde 9-yd fumble recovery (Mike Meyer kick)	Purdue 24–21
4	3:32	Iowa	Mike Meyer 24-yard field goal	Tied 24–24
4	0:00	Purdue	Sam McCartney 46-yard field goal	Purdue 27–24

=== Michigan ===
Iowa at Michigan

Team	1	2	3	4	Total
Iowa	7	3	0	7	17
• #23 Michigan	7	21	14	0	42

- Date: November 17
- Location: Michigan Stadium
  Ann Arbor, MI
- Game start: 11:00 a.m. CST
- Elapsed time: 3:06
- Game attendance: 113,016
- Game weather: 55 °F (13 °C), Partly Cloudy, Calm Wind
- Referee: Dennis Lipski
- TV announcers (ESPN): Dave Pasch, Brian Griese, and Jenn Brown
- Source

Scoring summary
1	8:27	Michigan	Devin Gardner 1-yard run (Brendan Gibbons kick)	Michigan 7–0
1	1:44	Iowa	Henry Krieger Coble 16-yard pass from James Vandenberg (Mike Meyer kick)	Tied 7–7
2	13:05	Michigan	Roy Roundtree 37-yard pass from Devin Gardner (Brendan Gibbons kick)	Michigan 14–7
2	9:26	Iowa	Mike Meyer 27-yard field goal	Michigan 14–10
2	5:20	Michigan	Devin Gardner 1-yard run (Brendan Gibbons kick)	Michigan 21–10
2	0:40	Michigan	Vincent Smith 18-yard pass from Devin Gardner (Brendan Gibbons kick)	Michigan 28–10
3	8:41	Michigan	Devin Gardner 3-yard run (Brendan Gibbons kick)	Michigan 35–10
3	4:33	Michigan	Devin Funchess 29-yard pass from Devin Gardner (Brendan Gibbons kick)	Michigan 42–10
4	2:12	Iowa	Mark Weisman 13-yard pass from James Vandenberg (Mike Meyer kick)	Michigan 42–17

=== Nebraska ===
Nebraska at Iowa
Heroes Game

Team	1	2	3	4	Total
• #14 Nebraska	3	0	10	0	13
Iowa	7	0	0	0	7

- Date: November 23
- Location: Kinnick Stadium
  Iowa City, IA
- Game start: 11:00 a.m. CST
- Elapsed time: 3:05
- Game attendance: 69,805
- Game weather: 31 °F (−1 °C), Mostly Sunny, Wind 26 mph (42 km/h) NW
- Referee: Dan Capron
- TV announcers (ABC): Mike Patrick, Ed Cunningham, and Jeannine Edwards
- Source

Scoring summary
1	6:51	Nebraska	Brett Maher 26-yd field goal	Nebraska 3–0
1	0:28	Iowa	James Vandenberg 1-yd run (Mike Meyer kick)	Iowa 7–3
3	9:30	Nebraska	Brett Maher 52-yd field goal	Iowa 7–6
3	3:10	Nebraska	Rex Burkhead 3-yd run (Brett Maher kick)	Nebraska 13–7

== Players in the 2013 NFL draft ==
Player	Position	Round	Pick	NFL club	Ref
Micah Hyde	Cornerback	5	159	Green Bay Packers	
