= Gary Barta =

American athletic director (born 1963)

- Born: September 4, 1963 (age 63); Minneapolis, Minnesota, U.S.
- Education: North Dakota State University

Gary Barta (born September 4, 1963) is the former athletic director at the University of Iowa. Barta retired from the university on July 31, 2023.

== Early life and education ==
Barta was born on September 4, 1963, and grew up in the Minneapolis area.

Barta earned his bachelor's degree from North Dakota State University (NDSU). While at NDSU, he was a member of the Bison football teams that won the NCAA Division II Football Championship in 1983, 1985, and 1986.

== Career ==
Barta was the athletic director at the University of Wyoming from 2003 to 2006. In early 2005, Barta was a finalist for the athletic director position at Arizona State University. Prior to serving as the athletic director at Wyoming, Barta served as an administrator in the athletic departments at the University of Washington and University of Northern Iowa.

Barta became the director of athletics at the University of Iowa on August 1, 2006. He has spearheaded numerous upgrades to existing athletic facilities and the construction of many new facilities, including the expansion of the administrative office complex at Carver–Hawkeye Arena, the expansion of the wrestling training facility, and the building of new practice gyms and weight training facilities at the Carver–Hawkeye Arena. Other upgrades include improvement of the sound system, scoreboard and video boards at Kinnick Stadium, construction of the Hoak Family Golf Complex, and building both the P. Sue Beckwith Boat House and the Campus Recreation and Aquatic Center in partnership with the university's department of recreational services.

In the fall of 2014, the new Stew & LeNore Hansen Football Performance Center was completed, which includes the new Richard O. Jacobson Football Operations Center and a new 120-yard indoor practice field. Also in late 2014, a new artificial baseball playing surface was installed at Duane Banks Field. In 2016, new video scoreboards were installed at the Carver-Hawkeye Arena.

Barta has hired numerous new head coaches during his tenure, including Mark Hankins and Tyler Stith (men's golf); Ross Wilson (men's tennis); Todd Lickliter and Fran McCaffery (men's basketball); Rick Heller (baseball); Joey Woody (track & field); Sharon Dingman and Bond Shymansky (women's volleyball); Steve Pitzker and Andrew Carter (women's crew); Dave DiIanni (women's soccer); Katie Dougherty and Sasha Schmid (women's tennis); Megan Menzel (women's golf); Lisa Cellucci (field hockey); and Marla Looper (softball).

Iowa's NACDA Director's Cup Big Ten Rankings By Year under Barta: 2006-07: 11th(out of 11); 2007-08: 11th(out of 11); 2008-09: 10th(out of 11); 2009-10: 11th(out of 11); 2010-11: 9th(out of 11); 2011-12: 12th(out of 12); 2012-13: 12th(out of 12); 2013-14: 12th(out of 12); 2014-15: 10th(out of 14); 2015-16: 13th(out of 14)

In February 2016, the president Bruce Harreld extended Barta's contract through June 30, 2021. The new contract includes $4.6 million in guaranteed compensation with an increase each in annual base salary, annual deferred compensation, and annual bonuses.

In October 2017, it was revealed that Barta has been diagnosed with prostate cancer. He notified the university that he will be taking an extended leave of absence until he is able to recover. Barbara Burke took over the athletic director responsibilities while Barta received treatment.

On May 26, 2023, Barta announced his retirement from the post. His AD tenure will be exactly 17 years long as his last day will be August 1, 2023.

== Controversy while at Iowa ==
=== Griesbaum-Meyer scandal ===
On August 4, 2014, Barta fired field hockey coach, Tracey Griesbaum, following what he said were allegations from a group of former players who complained that Griesbaum had been verbally abusive to them, and had created an atmosphere of intimidation within the program. This led to a vocal outcry from many current and former players and other supporters who called for the immediate reinstatement of Griesbaum as the head coach.

The Iowa board of regents and then University of Iowa president Sally Mason refused to hear or consider any appeal to the dismissal. This led to four current and former field hockey players filing, on January 28, 2015, a formal Title IX Civil Rights complaint to the U.S Department of Education. After an initial inquiry, the US Department of Education informed the University of Iowa on May 22, 2015, that it will conduct a formal investigation to determine if gender bias was a factor in the firing of Griesbaum and other female coaches at Iowa. On May 5, 2016, a story by Annie Brown of the Center for Investigative Reporting was published on the organization's Reveal website and carried on its radio program. Brown said the names of those who made the allegations were never revealed. She sought to find them. Reaching out to 60 of Griesbaum's former players, "hoping to find one who complained or thought the allegations of verbal abuse or forcing athletes to play injured were justified. Twenty-four agreed to speak, but none had anything negative to say about Griesbaum," Brown reported. The story noted that Barta has fired 5 female coaches since becoming athletic director, but when pressed by Brown, Barta declined to discuss the number of females at the university, saying the issue is a national problem.

On July 27, 2015, Griesbaum filed a formal civil rights complaint against the University of Iowa with the Iowa Civil Rights Commission. This was the first step required by Iowa law to ultimately file a civil lawsuit regarding her termination. On January 24, 2016, the Iowa Civil Rights Commission announced their findings in the Griesbaum complaint and indicated that she has a "reasonable possibility" of proving that gender or anti-gay discrimination played a role in her firing. Griesbaum filed a civil lawsuit against the University of Iowa on March 7, 2016.

On November 4, 2015, former associate athletic director, Jane Meyer, filed an employment discrimination lawsuit against the University of Iowa, the board of regents, and the State of Iowa. This was a result of being reassigned from the department of athletics in anticipation of her domestic partner's, Tracey Griesbaum, anticipated lawsuit against the athletic department for wrongful termination. Meyer's lawsuit went to trial in May 2017. The jury found that Barta and the UI had discriminated against Meyer, and awarded her $1.43 million in damages. Three weeks later, UI settled all claims with Meyer and Griesbaum, totalling $6.5 million.

When Barbara Burke became Iowa deputy athletic deputy director in 2017, USA Today noted "she was promoted to the No. 2 position in the University of Iowa athletic department the same week the department went on trial for discriminating against a female ex-employee."

In 2017, NPR featured Barta in "A man's game: Inside the inequality that plagues women's college sports." It noted that there was a growing concern that "at Iowa, female coaches were losing ground. Barta had forced out five female coaches in six years. The place that was once a model for gender equity was starting to look a lot like the rest of the country." NPR noted, "Barta replaced two of the five female coaches he ousted with men – and paid those men 25 percent more than their female predecessors. For the three he replaced with other women, he paid those women 13 percent less, according to public salary data. By comparison, when Barta replaced male coaches with other men, he paid the new male coaches 10 percent more." Nevertheless, Barta told NPR that his desire is "to hire the absolute very best, most qualified person available." On why he has replaced female coaches with men, he said, "It's a national phenomenon, not just a problem at Iowa. Are we nationally concerned that there aren't enough women coaching women's sports? The answer is yes," Barta said. "But 50 percent is higher than the state average, it's higher than the Big Ten average and it's higher than the national average."

=== Nepotism concerns ===
In January 2012, head football coach Kirk Ferentz hired his son, Brian Ferentz, as the offensive line coach. While the younger Ferentz had experience coaching in the NFL, the hire breached UI nepotism rules and guidelines. In response, Barta claimed that he, not Kirk Ferentz, had made the decision to hire Brian for the job. This was almost immediately contradicted by Brian Ferentz at his introductory news conference, where he stated that his father had "reached out" to him about the job: "Once he had an idea of what he wanted to do, he reached out to me... It was a no-brainer. You can't say no to your father." Barta then instituted a management plan wherein he would act as the younger Ferentz's boss, rather than the head coach Kirk Ferentz, skirting the nepotism laws.

During the 2022 season, during which the Iowa offense again ranked among the worst in FBS in points, offensive efficiency, and offensive yardage, the issue of nepotism became a local and national concern. Local reporters called for an "overhaul" of Iowa's "broken" offense. National outlets such as The Athletic, CBS Sports, and Slate covered the issue of offensive futility, with Slate publishing an article titled "The Iowa Football Team Is the Best Case Against Nepotism That Humankind Has Ever Seen." After a 54–10 loss at Ohio State, which saw Iowa turn the ball over six times, Cleveland.com reporter Doug Lesmerises wrote a column that night calling for Brian Ferentz to be fired, stating "head coach is not a king, and he doesn’t get to hand out jobs by blood. The Ferentz family can leave Iowa whenever they want, but Iowa fans are locked in for life. A football program at a state university is a public trust. Loyal Hawkeyes aren’t going to abandon their program, so at the moment, they’re held hostage by a head coach treating the program like a family business."

Iowa Football’s director of recruiting and NFL liaison, Tyler Barnes, is Kirk Ferentz’s son-in-law. Barnes attended Iowa and is married to Ferentz’s daughter Joanne. From 2009–2012, Barnes served as a student assistant, graduate assistant, and administrative assistant. Barnes left Iowa in 2013 shortly after it was revealed that Ferentz had pushed to extend Barnes’ contract for another year, without informing athletic director Barta that Barnes was engaged to his daughter. Barnes returned to Iowa football in 2016. In a similar arrangement to Brian Ferentz’s, Barta, not Ferentz, wrote his employment letter, and is his direct-report. This arrangement skirts University nepotism policies. “What we do is really competitive. It would really be counterintuitive to hire people who aren’t going to try to benefit and enhance our program,” Ferentz responded to questions about nepotism. “Any time we hire a coach, support personnel, we’re trying to get the guys best qualified to work at our place.” Barnes avoided questions about nepotism in his press conferences, stating he did not think it had an effect on his hiring “at all.”

==== 2011 rhabdomyolysis scandal ====
In 2011, thirteen football players ended up in University Hospital with extreme cases of rhabdomyolysis, a serious muscle condition, following an offseason workout administered by strength coach Chris Doyle. Athletic director Barta and Iowa tried to keep it under wraps, issuing a press release and state that no further comment would be forthcoming. National scrutiny rose, and later another press conference was convened. Barta, head coach Kirk Ferentz, and Doyle were not in attendance, instead letting a UI doctor and Biff Poggi, parent of injured player Jim Poggi, answer questions. Ferentz later relented and faced the media, admitting his error in a February press conference. Ferentz defended Doyle, stating he was "probably the most sought-after coach that I've ever been around," adding that "you couldn't ask for a better person to head that [strength and conditioning] up."

A university conducted an internal investigation, finding that the preparation and response by the coaching staff was lacking. One of the injured players eventually sued and settled for around $15,000.

=== Alleged racial bias in Iowa football ===
During the 2020 racial unrest in the United States after the murder of George Floyd, Black former Iowa football players called for changes within the program. Former Iowa offensive lineman James Daniels tweeted "If the team collectively decides to kneel, this will bring about a cultural change for both Iowa football and the state of Iowa which I believe is long overdue!!!" Two days later, Daniels followed up with a second tweet asserting “there are too many racial disparities in the Iowa football program. Black players have been treated unfairly for far too long.” Several other Iowa players added to Daniels' claims, citing Strength and Conditioning coach Chris Doyle and offensive coordinator Brian Ferentz (directly under the supervision of Barta) as two of the leading causes of racial disparities in Iowa football. Former Iowa defensive lineman Jaleel Johnson wrote on Twitter "Coach Doyle is the problem in that building. And so is Brian Ferentz.... things won't progress until those two fix themselves. They know they're a problem."

An external review from the law firm Husch Blackwell corroborated the players' complaints of racial bias in the Iowa football program. "In sum, the program’s rules perpetuated racial or cultural biases and diminished the value of cultural diversity," the report read. "The program over-monitored players to the point that they experienced heightened anxiety and maintained a culture that allowed a small group of coaches to demean players." The report stated that several current and former players believed that some coaches used the program’s foundation of discipline and accountability “to perpetuate an environment that bullies and demeans athletes, especially Black athletes." Kirk Ferentz responded to the report, stating "this review brings us face to face with allegations of uneven treatment, where our culture that mandated uniformity caused many Black players to feel they were unable to show up as their authentic selves,’’ Ferentz said. “I want to apologize for the pain and frustration they felt at a time when I was trusted to help each of them become a better player and a better person.’’

Chris Doyle was placed on administrative leave and later terminated, receiving 15 months' salary (approximately $556,000). After a review with athletic director Gary Barta, Kirk's son Brian Ferentz continued his role for Iowa football without suspension, leave, or fine. In the summer of 2020, Ferentz created a diversity committee, made up of former players. During the 2021 season, chair of the committee David Porter recommended Ferentz retire and Iowa hire a new football coach. Ferentz dissolved the committee in January 2022 with plans to restructure, stating he was considering what a new committee might look like. When asked about Porter's recommendation, Ferentz stated "I read it and that's his opinion. There's not much to react to other than I have a different opinion. My intention is like long-term and big picture, not short-term. Everyone is allowed to have an opinion." Ferentz ended up permanently dissolving the committee, instead working with University DEI staff.

==== Football discrimination lawsuit and admonition by state auditor ====
In October 2020, eight Black former Iowa football players filed a federal discrimination lawsuit against the University, seeking $20 million in compensation and for athletics director Barta, head coach Kirk Ferentz, and assistant coach Brian Ferentz to be fired over what they allege was intentional racial discrimination during their time at Iowa. Players included running back Akrum Wadley. In March 2023, a settlement between the plaintiffs for 12 former players and the attorneys for the University of Iowa was reached. Per the agreement, the state Board of Regents would pay $4,175,000 to the former players, in addition to court costs. Approximately $2 million of the settlement money was paid by Iowa taxpayers. The Iowa Department of Management’s State Appeal Board voted 2-1 to approve the settlement on March 6.

Iowa State Auditor Rob Sand, one of the three appeal board members, said he would vote against using taxpayer funds for the settlement unless Barta was ousted. “There’s a certain point at which these colors need to serve the people who attended the institution and the taxpayers who pay for the institution. There’s a certain point at which an institution needs to communicate to the public that it isn’t just a group of insiders protecting each other — that’s what I think this settlement feels like unless Barta’s gone." Sand continued, stating “Under Gary Barta’s leadership at the University of Iowa Athletics Department, we’ve had Peter Gray scandal plus three instances of discrimination totaling nearly $7 million in damages (setting aside other suits)." Sand continued, stating “after the largest settlement, Barta asserted no wrong was done. Now we have a new matter for $4 million more, and for the first time they want part paid from the taxpayers’ General Fund, even though they now collect tens of millions annually thru the Big Ten TV deal... Enough is enough. Clear personal accountability is necessary. I will not support taxpayers funding this settlement unless Gary Barta is no longer employed at the University and forfeits any severance or similar pay.”

=== Other criticisms ===
In November 2017, reporter Scott Dochterman found via a Freedom of Information Act records request that Barta had given head men's basketball coach Fran McCaffery a pay increase, extension, and a doubled contract buyout in secret. McCaffery and the Hawkeye basketball team had been coming off a lackluster season, and Barta stated he wanted to wait until the next season's end. "It is what it is," Barta would tell the Des Moines Register. "And there was no conspiracy... I could’ve announced it. I chose not to. There’s really nothing in it to hide. It’s fair for people to criticize.”

=== College Football Playoff committee ===
In 2021, Barta served as chair of the College Football Playoff selection committee. He received widespread criticism for his contradictory and confusing reasons for the rankings, setting impossible standards for Group of Five teams, and establishing one hierarchy of evidence for one school before discarding it for another. Two weeks after Michigan State defeated Michigan, the committee ranked Michigan ahead of the Spartans. Barta stated "set aside watching the games, though that’s certainly a part of it. But statistically in just about every category, offensively and defensively, Michigan comes out on top over Michigan State."

== Awards ==
On March 2, 2016, the National Association of Collegiate Directors of Athletics (NACDA) announced that Barta was one of four athletic directors from the Football Bowl Subdivision of the NCAA to receive the Athletic Director of the Year Award.
