= Complementary football =

Theory in American football

Complementary football is a theory in American football that states that a lack of performance in any one of the three phases of the game [offense, defense, special teams] can subsequently alter the game's flow in the following possessions; so, the three units of a team must operate in synergy as a collective for the best chance to win.

== History and use of the term ==
The idea of 'complementary football' is a broad, obvious idea of the sport, and there is no inventor, in the traditional sense, of the concept. The usage of "complementary football" as a specific term is often utilized by coaches who served under Bill Belichick or Bill Parcells.

Tedy Bruschi, who played from 1996 to 2008 for the New England Patriots, gave an example using an excerpt of the October 23, 2015, game between the (Belichick-led) Patriots and New York Jets.

How the Patriots scored their first touchdown Sunday was a result of complementary football. It started with a punt early in the second quarter, as the team was already trailing 10-3.

Ryan Allen's punt was a good one, with Jeremy Kerley calling for a fair catch at the Jets' 8-yard line.

The Jets then ran for 2 yards on first down, and then 6 yards on second down. On a critical third-and-2, quarterback Ryan Fitzpatrick's pass to receiver Brandon Marshall to the left sideline was incomplete.

That forced a Steve Weatherford punt, and it wasn't a very good one -- 31 yards.

The Patriots took over at the Jets' 47-yard line, so with the offense not even being on the field, they end up seven yards ahead of where they were on the previous drive.

Receiver Danny Amendola's 8-yard catch on third-and-7 was a critical play, as he caught the ball short of the sticks but ducked under safety Marcus Gilchrist, then surged ahead for the first down.

Then Amendola stayed hot with a 23-yard catch over the middle, setting the stage for Tom Brady's 11-yard scramble on third-and-10 to keep the drive alive. It ended with Brady's 1-yard leaping sneak for a touchdown in which he reached the ball over the goal line.

When you look back on the sequence, all of it was made possible due to the execution of the punt team doing its job. Then it took the defense producing a three-and-out, setting the stage for the offense to take over possession seven yards ahead of where they ended the previous drive.

That is the essence of complementary football.

Before the establishment of the term in pop football lexicon in recent years, Parcells, Belichick's colleague and subsequently his boss during their time with the New York Giants from 1979–1990 and the New York Jets from 1997–1999, had his teams described as operating under "the theory of complementary offense and defense". Parcells himself would state that his teams would need to "play [good teams] in a complementary fashion".

Parcells first served on a coaching staff with Bill Belichick on the 1979 New York Giants, where Parcells was the linebackers coach and Belichick was the special teams coordinator in addition to assisting Parcells with coaching the linebackers. Belichick would assume Parcells' vacated role in 1980 as Parcells accepted the same position with the New England Patriots. However, Parcells would return to the Giants the following year to serve as defensive coordinator, while sharing linebacker coaching duties with Belichick until Parcells was elevated to head coach in 1983. Parcells would eventually elevate Belichick to defensive coordinator in 1985, and the pair would win a pair of Super Bowls to conclude the 1986 and 1990 seasons. Belichick would take the Cleveland Browns head coaching job in February 1991, and Parcells would retire (for the first time) in May of the same year.

Belichick would reunite with Parcells as his assistant head coach in 1996 with the New England Patriots following his termination in Cleveland. Belichick would follow Parcells to New York in 1997, staying with him until 1999, when Parcells would retire from coaching but retain the general manager position. Belichick, technically the head coach of the Jets, would resign from the organization and ultimately rejoin the New England Patriots, who would hire Belichick as their head coach shortly roughly three weeks after his resignation in January 2000.

Iowa Hawkeyes head coach Kirk Ferentz, who served under Belichick as his offensive line coach with the Cleveland Browns from 1993 to 1996, is a similarly long-term proponent of the theory.

Ferentz is on record as being "[appreciative] for how punters can affect and impact the game," an example of Ferentz's application and understanding of the strategy within the special teams realm.

This concept saw an increase in interest due to the invocation by Iowa Hawkeyes offensive coordinator Brian Ferentz, also a proponent of the theory, amidst the Hawkeyes' offensive struggles and allegations of nepotism. Ahead of a season in which the Hawkeyes' defense would concede the second–fewest points while the offense, inversely, would score the third–fewest, in July 2022, Ferentz said: “Look at the worst defenses in the league. How often does it correlate with one of the better offenses in the league? More than you think. You just have to know who you are. You have to play complementary football.”

Before working under his father at Iowa, Brian Ferentz also served under Belichick, from 2008 to 2011, on the Patriots staff as an offensive quality control coach for his first three seasons, and as the tight ends coach for his fourth and final. Ferentz's contract was not renewed for the 2024 season at Iowa, and as of 2026, he coaches tight ends for the Fresno State Bulldogs.

Charlie Weis, who worked with and for Belichick in various capacities from 1996 to 2004, spoke of "complementary game plans" in 2007 as head coach of the Notre Dame Fighting Irish and in 2014 as head coach of the Kansas Jayhawks.

Todd Haley referred to the philosophy, speaking to the media while leading the Kansas City Chiefs in 2010. Haley's first coaching job was with the New York Jets coaching staff from 1997 to 1999 as the wide receivers coach while Belichick served as assistant head coach and defensive coordinator. Haley's father, Dick, served as director of player personnel and led draft planning during these same years, and Parcells hired him to serve as the wide receivers coach and passing game coordinator from 2004 to 2006.

Bill O'Brien, who worked for Belichick with the Patriots between 2007 and 2011 in a myriad of positions (including holding the offensive coordinator title for the 2011 season), used the term frequently as head coach with the Penn State Nittany Lions and Houston Texans.

Under Mike Zimmer, starting in 2018, it was noted that the Minnesota Vikings referred to operating in harmony on offense, defense, and special teams as "complementary football". Zimmer served as defensive coordinator for the Dallas Cowboys from 2000 to 2006, and from 2003 to 2006 served under head coach Bill Parcells.

Dan Campbell used the term when he spoke of his Detroit Lions' successes through his stint as head coach in the 2020s. Describing what he subsequently ascribe his definition of the term to be, Campbell stated, "[W]e did not play our cleanest ball, we really didn't. However, when you have four takeaways on defense, you're five-of-five in the red zone, and you have the returns that our special teams unit had—punt return and kick return—then you can get a lot of production, and things sway your way."

Campbell was signed by Bill Parcells in 2003 to the Dallas Cowboys, and he would play under Parcells as a Cowboy through the 2005 season. Campbell would join the Miami Dolphins in 2010 as a coaching intern, beginning his professional coaching career the same year Parcells would leave his post as Executive VP of Football Operations with the Dolphins.

The term saw wider usage in the early-2020s across a broader spectrum of football players, coaches, and writers.
