= Brian Ferentz =

American football player and coach (born 1983)

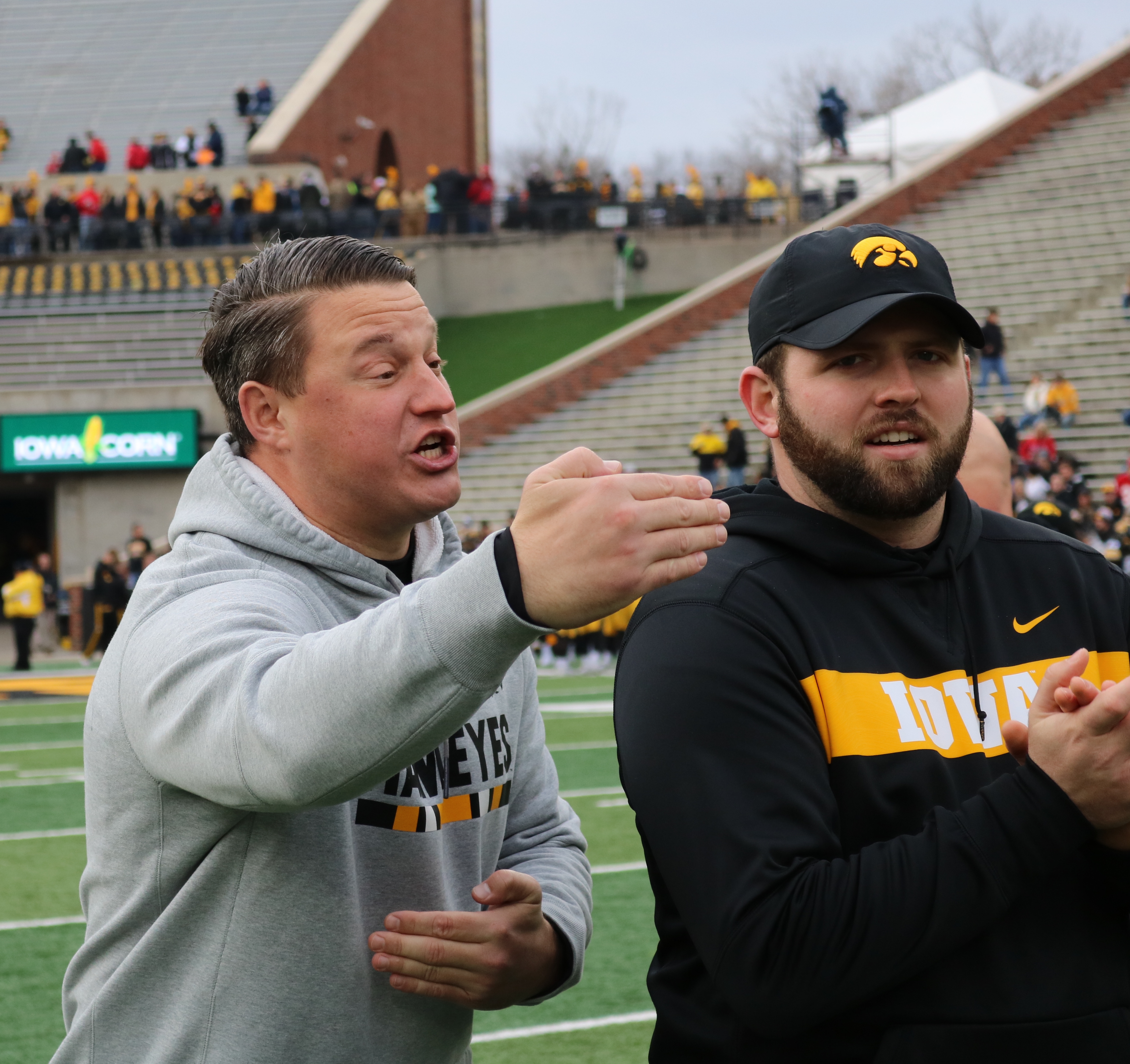
- Ferentz with Iowa in 2018

Current position
- Title: Offensive line coach
- Team: Fresno State
- Conference: Pac-12

Biographical details
- Born: March 28, 1983 (age 43); Iowa City, Iowa, U.S.
- Education: University of Iowa (2006)

Playing career
- 2002–2005: Iowa
- 2006: Atlanta Falcons
- 2007: New Orleans Saints
- Position: Offensive lineman

Coaching career (HC unless noted)
- 2008–2010: New England Patriots (OQC)
- 2011: New England Patriots (TE)
- 2012–2014: Iowa (OL)
- 2015–2016: Iowa (RGC/OL)
- 2017: Iowa (OC/RB)
- 2018–2021: Iowa (OC/TE)
- 2022–2023: Iowa (OC/QB)
- 2024: Maryland (OA)
- 2025: Fresno State (TE)
- 2026–present: Fresno State (OL)

Brian Ferentz (born March 28, 1983) is an American college football coach and former player who is the offensive line coach at Fresno State. Following his collegiate career at the University of Iowa, as an offensive lineman, Ferentz was in the NFL for the Atlanta Falcons in 2006 and New Orleans Saints in 2007. Following his playing career, Ferentz began a coaching tenure. Ferentz coached in the NFL for the New England Patriots from 2008 to 2011. Serving as the tight ends coach for the Patriots in 2011, Aaron Hernandez and Rob Gronkowski set NFL records for receptions, yards, and touchdowns by tight ends, and Gronkowski became the first tight end in NFL history to lead the league in touchdown receptions. Ferentz then began a coaching tenure at Iowa in 2012.

He was the offensive coordinator at the University of Iowa from 2017 to 2023. He served under his father, the Iowa head coach Kirk Ferentz. In the years as offensive coordinator in his tenure at Iowa, Ferentz faced scrutiny due to alleged nepotism within the program, tied to the underperformance of Iowa's offenses under his instruction. In 2024, Ferentz became the Senior Offensive Assistant at Maryland.

== Early life and playing career ==
Ferentz was born March 28, 1983, in Iowa City, Iowa. From 1996 to 1998 while his father Kirk Ferentz was the offensive line coach for the Baltimore Ravens, he attended Gilman School in Baltimore, Maryland, for two years. After his father became head football coach at the University of Iowa, he completed his high school studies at Iowa City High School graduating in the spring of 2001. Ferentz played football at Iowa City High School. and then as an offensive lineman for his father, Iowa head coach Kirk Ferentz, from 2001 through 2005. After battling injuries early in his career, Ferentz started his final 20 games at Iowa at center or guard, playing for offensive line coach Reece Morgan and offensive coordinator Ken O'Keefe. Ferentz earned honorable mention All-Big Ten honors his senior season. He earned his bachelor's degree in history from Iowa in 2006.

After going undrafted in the 2006 NFL draft, Ferentz signed a free agent contract with the Atlanta Falcons in May 2006. He was released by the Falcons on September 2, 2006, and spent the season on the Falcons' practice squad. He was waived by the Falcons on May 14, 2007, and signed by the New Orleans Saints on August 13, 2007, only to be released by the Saints on September 1, 2007.

== Coaching career ==
=== New England Patriots (2008–2011) ===
Ferentz joined the New England Patriots in 2008 as a scouting assistant. His father Kirk was the offensive line coach from 1993 to 1995 under Bill Belichick when Belichick coached the Cleveland Browns. In 2009, Ferentz became an offensive coaching assistant. Before the 2010 season, Ferentz's became an offensive assistant coach, working primarily with the Patriots' tight ends. He was officially promoted to tight ends coach in 2011. That season, the Patriots' tight end duo of Aaron Hernandez and Rob Gronkowski set NFL records for receptions, yards, and touchdowns by tight ends, and Gronkowski became the first tight end in NFL history to lead the league in touchdown receptions.

=== Iowa (2012–2023) ===
In February 2012, Ferentz took the position of offensive line coach for the Iowa Hawkeyes, coached by his father Kirk Ferentz. The hire breached UI nepotism rules and guidelines. In response, athletic director Gary Barta claimed that he had made the decision to hire Brian for the job. This was contradicted by Brian Ferentz at his introductory news conference, where he stated that his father had "reached out" to him about the job: "Once he had an idea of what he wanted to do, he reached out to me... It was a no-brainer. You can't say no to your father." Barta then instituted a management plan wherein he would act as the younger Ferentz's boss, rather than the head coach Kirk Ferentz, skirting the nepotism laws. Ferentz joined a reconfigured offensive coaching staff under offensive coordinator Greg Davis.

From 2012 to 2016, Ferentz served as offensive line coach for the Hawkeyes. Ferentz coached several all-Big Ten offensive linemen and future NFL players during this period, including his brother James Ferentz, centers Austin Blythe and James Daniels, guards Matt Tobin, Sean Welsh and Jordan Walsh, and tackles Brandon Scherff, Andrew Donnal, Ike Boettger, and Cole Croston. In 2015 and 2016, Ferentz was also the Iowa running game coordinator. The Iowa offensive line earned the 2016 Joe Moore Award, which is presented to the best offensive line in college football. That season, two Iowa rushers (Akrum Wadley and LeShun Daniels) ran for 1,000 yards for the first time in school history.

On January 3, 2014, Bill O'Brien was announced as the new head coach of the Houston Texans and Ferentz was rumored to join the organization as the offensive line coach. Instead, the Texans chose to hire Paul Dunn, the former Atlanta Falcons offensive line coach. Ferentz and O'Brien worked together on the Patriots staff during the early 2010s.

==== Offensive coordinator ====
On January 9, 2017, Ferentz was named the new offensive coordinator for Iowa. Over the next six seasons, he would coach running backs, tight ends, and quarterbacks in addition to coordinating the offense.

In 2017, Ferentz's offense worked with new starting quarterback Nate Stanley, who replaced the graduated C.J. Beathard. The offense was inconsistent, typified by a two-game stretch that saw Iowa gain 487 yards and score 55 points over #3 Ohio State in an upset win; in the following week, Iowa gained only 66 yards and did not score on offense in a 38–14 loss at Wisconsin. After the season, Ferentz switched to coaching tight ends.

2018 and 2019 saw Stanley and the Iowa offense utilize several future NFL players, including tackles Tristan Wirfs and Alaric Jackson, wide receivers Brandon Smith and Ihmir Smith-Marsette, and All-American tight ends Noah Fant and TJ Hockensen. However, Iowa's offensive inconsistency continued, with Iowa ranking 91st and 86th out of 130 FBS teams in yards per play in '18 and '19. Back-to-back low-scoring games in 2019 at #19 Michigan (3 points) and against #10 Penn State (12 points) undermined Iowa's chances for a Big Ten Championship appearance in a 10–3 season, though the Hawkeyes ended the season with a 49–24 victory over the USC Trojans in the 2019 Holiday Bowl.

On June 6, 2020, Ferentz and Iowa strength coach Chris Doyle were accused by former players of having made racially insensitive comments and contributing to a program culture that was unwelcoming to black student-athletes. Doyle was later placed on administrative leave.

Ferentz named quarterback Spencer Petras as Stanley's replacement prior to the 2020 season. After struggling in the opening two losses, the running game rebounded well enough behind All-American center Tyler Linderbaum and running back Tyler Goodson to assist the elite Iowa defense in winning the final six games of the shortened season. Iowa's yards per play fell slightly, though their national rank in YPP remained at 86th out of 130.

In 2021, Iowa's elite defense carried over another year, leading the nation with 25 interceptions and among the national leaders in every major statistical category. Despite the improved field position from the defense, however, Iowa's offense struggled to score points, ranking 99th in the country in points per game. The Hawkeyes' yards per play average dropped to 120th in the nation. The team was ranked as high as second in the nation and won the Big Ten West, but the offense undermined what became a nationally recognized defense. In the 2021 Big Ten Championship game against Michigan, Iowa's offense managed only 3 points and 279 total yards. Through its 14 games in 2021, Iowa finished with 12 passing touchdowns and 11 interceptions from Petras and backup Alex Padilla. After the season, two of Iowa's top wide receivers, Charlie Jones and Tyrone Tracy, transferred to division rival Purdue.

During the 2022 season, Ferentz's wide receivers coach Kelton Copeland admitted "it really is a challenge recruiting receivers here" after being asked about the anemic Iowa passing offense. Charlie Jones, who had transferred to Purdue, received first-team all-Big Ten honors as wide receiver, finishing with twice as many receiving touchdowns (12) as the entire Iowa team during the regular season. Iowa finished the regular season with 6 passing touchdowns in 12 games. At the conclusion of the 2022 season, Iowa's offense ranked second to last in the nation in yards per game (222.6 yards/game), the lowest for an Iowa team since 1978. Ferentz made $900,000 in 2022.

On February 6, 2023, Ferentz received a $50,000 pay cut and a designated performance objective to average at least 25 points per game while the program wins at least seven games, announced by athletic director Barta. Ferentz's salary dropped to $850,000 from $900,000.

On October 30, 2023, Ferentz was informed by Iowa interim athletic director Beth Goetz that he would not be retained for the 2024 season, but would be allowed to coach the remainder of the 2023 schedule. The Hawkeyes were averaging 19.5 points per game — 120th out of 133 FBS programs — at the time of the announcement despite a 6–2 record and 3–2 mark in the Big Ten.

In Ferentz' tenure as an assistant coach at Iowa, numerous tight ends were drafted into the NFL. C. J. Fiedorowicz, George Kittle, T. J. Hockenson, Noah Fant, and Sam LaPorta were all drafted into the NFL; Fant and Hockenson were both first-round draft selections in 2019. At the beginning of the 2023 football season, 13 former Iowa offensive players were active on NFL rosters.

=== Maryland (2024) ===
The University of Maryland hired Ferentz as a senior offensive assistant in April 2024.

=== Fresno State (2025–present) ===
On January 15, 2025, Ferentz was named as the tight ends coach at California State University, Fresno (Fresno State) under head coach Matt Entz. On February 4, 2026, Ferentz was promoted to offensive line coach for the Bulldogs, replacing Zach Crabtree.

== Coaching philosophy ==
Ferentz is an adherent to a pro-style, outside zone-based system, as is his father Kirk Ferentz. The blocking is based on the philosophy of longtime offensive line coach Alex Gibbs, who popularized zone blocking in the NFL, using smaller, quicker linemen. Recent rule changes in cut-blocking have reduced the effectiveness of the scheme, but several successful offenses in professional and collegiate football continue to use outside or wide zone running plays. Three of main proponents of the zone scheme in the 1990s, Kirk Ferentz, Gary Kubiak, and Mike Shanahan, all have sons who have followed in their fathers' footsteps and called plays. Unlike Kyle Shanahan and Klint Kubiak's modernized iterations, however, Kirk and Brian's Iowa offense remained stagnant through the 2022 season. Though Iowa's offenses are predictable as a result, Kirk and Brian believe execution mitigates predictability.

Ferentz has coached several offensive skill positions despite his background as an offensive lineman. On his year as a running backs coach, Ferentz stated in 2020 during a coaching clinic "I'm like the worst running back coach in America. I was a shitty running back coach... I did it for a year, and I quit. It was too hard. I was no good at it." After taking over as quarterbacks coach in spring 2022, Ferentz told media "man, I got a lot to learn."

Brian, like his father Kirk Ferentz, is an adherent to complementary football, a theory that believes a poor offense assists an excellent defense and finds advantage in field position rather than points. "We’ve got to know what kind of game we’re going to be in, " Ferentz said to a reporter in the summer of 2022. "Look at the worst defenses in the league. How often does it correlate with one of the better offenses in the league? More than you think. You just have to know who you are. You have to play complementary football." Ferentz had previously described his father's philosophy, saying the offense "needs to protect our defense and keep them out of bad positions. That means we need to protect the football. We need to change field position," adding "we need to score as many points as we can with the opportunities we have."

== Criticisms and off-field incidents ==
=== Accusation of racial bias ===
During the 2020 racial unrest in the United States, triggered by the murder of George Floyd by police, Black former Iowa football players called for changes within the program. Former Iowa offensive lineman James Daniels tweeted "If the team collectively decides to kneel, this will bring about a cultural change for both Iowa football and the state of Iowa which I believe is long overdue!!!" Two days later, Daniels followed up with a second tweet asserting “there are too many racial disparities in the Iowa football program. Black players have been treated unfairly for far too long.” Several other Iowa players added to Daniels' claims, citing Strength and Conditioning coach Chris Doyle and Brian Ferentz as two of the leading causes of racial disparities in Iowa football. Former Iowa defensive lineman Jaleel Johnson wrote on Twitter "Coach Doyle is the problem in that building. And so is Brian Ferentz.... things won't progress until those two fix themselves. They know they're a problem." An external review from the law firm Husch Blackwell corroborated the players' complaints of racial bias in the Iowa football program. Doyle was placed on administrative leave and later terminated. Brian Ferentz continued his role for Iowa football without suspension, leave, or fine.

In October 2020, eight Black former Iowa football players filed a federal discrimation lawsuit against the university, seeking $20 million in compensation and for athletics director Barta, head coach Kirk Ferentz, and assistant coach Brian Ferentz to be fired over what they allege was intentional racial discrimination during their time at Iowa. Players included running back Akrum Wadley. In March 2023, a settlement between the plaintiffs for 12 former players and the attorneys for the University of Iowa was reached. Per the agreement, the state Board of Regents would pay $4,175,000 to the former players, in addition to court costs. Approximately $2 million of the settlement money was paid by Iowa taxpayers. Head coach Kirk Ferentz, offensive coordinator Brian Ferentz, athletic director Gary Barta and former football strength coach Chris Doyle were dismissed as defendants with prejudice.

=== Public housing controversy ===
While on scholarship at Iowa, Ferentz lived in Section 8 housing—the only such housing in Iowa City designated for low income Iowans. As reported in 2005 by the Des Moines Register and ESPN's Outside the Lines, Ferentz and several other Iowa players paid "little to no rent" in publicly subsidized housing set aside for poor families, elderly people, and those with disabilities. His father Kirk was making approximately $2 million at the time and was the state's highest-paid public employee. As part of his scholarship, Brian Ferentz received $700 per month for housing and other expenses.

Politicians including U.S. senator Tom Harkin and John Weicher, head of the Section 8 program for the Department of Housing and Urban Development, called for investigations and an end to the loophole. "I consider it to be an abuse of (the Section 8 housing program) if people who do not really need help are displacing the many who truly do need it," Harkin said in a statement. "It's a huge loophole that absolutely has to be fixed," said Linda Couch, deputy director for the National Low-Income Housing Association. "Hundreds of thousands of people have been on waiting lists for this kind of housing across the country, some of them for years."

Brian's father Kirk deferred on the issue of housing his players, stating "to me, that's somebody else's job. That's not mine." Kirk Ferentz said he wanted to treat his son the same as any other player, though he expected some scrutiny. "When Brian made the decision to go to Iowa, he was fully aware that he may not just be treated like Joe Smith," Kirk Ferentz said. "But there are some advantages, too. And those outweigh the disadvantages." Ferentz also said his Brian wasn't given much financial aid. "His income is not very significant, I can assure you that," Ferentz said. "Maybe people get a heck of an allowance from home. I can tell you he doesn't."

== Personal life ==
Ferentz and his wife Nikki have three daughters and a son. His parents are Kirk and Mary Ferentz and his siblings are Kelly, Joanne, James, and Steven.
