= Kirk Ferentz =

American football coach (born 1955)

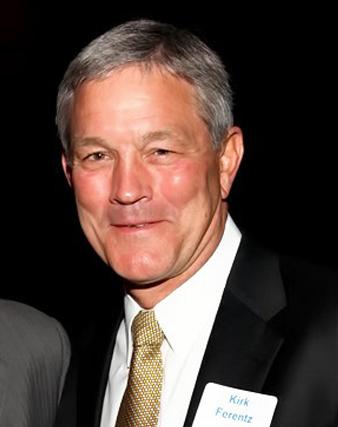
- Ferentz with Iowa in 2014

Current position
- Title: Head coach
- Team: Iowa
- Conference: Big Ten
- Record: 218–130 (Note: Ferentz's on-the-field record was 10–4. The NCAA ruled that Iowa must vacate four victories from the 2023 season, due to Iowa tampering with Cade McNamara before he entered the transfer portal.)
- Annual salary: $7 million

Biographical details
- Born: August 1, 1955 (age 71); Royal Oak, Michigan, U.S.

Playing career
- 1974–1976: Connecticut
- Position: Linebacker

Coaching career (HC unless noted)
- 1977: Connecticut (GA)
- 1978–1979: Worcester Academy (MA) (OL/DC)
- 1980: Pittsburgh (GA)
- 1981–1989: Iowa (OL)
- 1990–1992: Maine
- 1993–1995: Cleveland Browns (OL)
- 1996: Baltimore Ravens (OL)
- 1997–1998: Baltimore Ravens (AHC/OL)
- 1999–present: Iowa

Head coaching record
- Overall: 230–151
- Bowls: 11–11

Accomplishments and honors

Championships
- 2 Big Ten (2002, 2004); 3 Big Ten West Division (2015, 2021, 2023)

Awards
- AP College Football COY (2002); Walter Camp Coach of the Year (2002); 4× Big Ten Coach of the Year (2002, 2004, 2009, 2015); Bobby Dodd Coach of the Year Award (2015); Eddie Robinson Coach of the Year, Football Writers Association of America (2015); Region 3 Coach of the Year (American Football Coaches Association) (2015); Woody Hayes Coach of the Year (2015)

Kirk James Ferentz (born August 1, 1955) is an American football coach. He is the head football coach at the University of Iowa, a position he has held since the 1999 season. From 1990 to 1992, Ferentz was the head football coach at the University of Maine. He was also an assistant coach with the Cleveland Browns and Baltimore Ravens of the National Football League (NFL). Ferentz played college football as a linebacker at the University of Connecticut from 1974 to 1976. Since 2017, he has been the longest tenured FBS coach with one program. Ferentz is the all-time wins and losses leader in the Big Ten Conference.

== Playing career ==
Ferentz played high school football at Upper St. Clair High School near Pittsburgh, Pennsylvania. He was a standout linebacker and fullback, playing under Joe Moore, eventual offensive line coach at Pitt and Notre Dame. Ferentz also played baseball as a standout left-handed pitcher. In 1973, Ferentz committed to play football at the University of Connecticut. He was a football captain and an academic all-Yankee Conference linebacker at Connecticut. Ferentz was a team football captain and was named the ECAC Division II Defensive Player of the Week after 12 tackles and two fumble recoveries in a win against UMass. Ferentz's pregame speech against Boston University helped inspire the Huskies to their only home win of his senior season. Ferentz was named academic all-conference and earned defensive MVP honors. He served as a student assistant at Connecticut in 1977 under head coach Walt Nadzak.

== Early coaching career ==
=== Worcester Academy ===
Ferentz spent the 1978 and 1979 seasons as defensive coordinator and offensive line coach at Worcester Academy. Ferentz coached under Worcester head coach Ken O'Keefe and alongside offensive coordinator Mike Sherman, while coaching Joe Philbin, among others. At Worcester, Ferentz also taught English literature and coached the girls' basketball team.

=== Pittsburgh ===
After Worcester, Ferentz spent the 1980 season as a graduate assistant at the University of Pittsburgh, assisting his high school coach Joe Moore with the offensive line. The 1980 Pittsburgh Panthers football team, coached by Jackie Sherrill, finished with an 11–1 record and a number two national ranking. That Panthers team included several future NFL Hall of Famers and All-Americans, including quarterback Dan Marino and offensive linemen Jim Covert, Mark May, and Russ Grimm.

=== Iowa ===
The next season, Ferentz joined Hayden Fry's staff at the University of Iowa, coaching the Hawkeyes' offensive line from 1981 to 1989. Ferentz worked under Fry and offensive coordinator Bill Snyder, and alongside assistant coaches Barry Alvarez, Dan McCarney, and Don Patterson. In 1981, Ferentz's first season, the Hawkeyes achieved their first winning season since 1961 and their first Rose Bowl since 1958. In Ferentz's time as an assistant at Iowa, the Hawkeyes would win the Big Ten again in 1985, holding the No. 1 national ranking for five weeks. Iowa appeared in eight bowl games during the time Ferentz was an Iowa assistant, including two Rose Bowl appearances and two Holiday Bowl appearances.

Eleven Hawkeyes coached by Ferentz went on to play in the National Football League (NFL). Three of them were first round picks in the NFL draft, and five of his players were first team All-Big Ten Conference selections. Six of those players played over 100 games in the NFL: Offensive guards Ron Hallstrom, Mark Bortz, and Bob Kratch, tackles Brett Miller and John Alt, and center Joel Hilgenberg. Guard Mike Haight played in 63 games as well. Tackle Dave Croston won 1986 Big Ten Offensive Lineman of the Year, as would center Mike Devlin in 1992.

=== Maine ===
After nine seasons at Iowa, Ferentz returned to New England to become the head coach at the University of Maine in 1990, replacing Tom Lichtenberg. Ferentz took a $3,000 pay cut to become the head coach of the Black Bears, who had initially offered Tom O'Brien the job. In his first two seasons, Maine finished tied for seventh in the Yankee Conference (D1-AA), finishing 3–8 overall and 2–6 in conference play both years. Ferentz lost his first five games as head coach in 1990, but responded by winning three of his final six against Rhode Island, Delaware, and Northeastern. In 1991, Maine defeated Ferentz's alma mater Connecticut 41–20.

In 1992, the Black Bears improved to 6–5 overall, 4–4 in conference play. The team won its first two games against New Hampshire and Kutztown; on November 14, the Bears upset No. 16 UMass at McGuirk Stadium in what would be Ferentz's final win at Maine. Maine finished tied for fifth in the Yankee Conference. Offensive tackle Dan Jones went unselected in the 1993 NFL draft, but would go on to play 34 games for the Cincinnati Bengals.

After three seasons in charge, Ferentz led the Black Bears to a combined 12–21 record. "The good news is in Maine, nobody noticed the mistakes I made," Ferentz stated in 2018. "They were more interested in hunting season at that point. Or the hockey season, probably." Ferentz was succeeded by offensive coordinator and Maine alumnus Jack Cosgrove, who would coach the Black Bears for 23 seasons, winning three conference championships and compiling a 137–153 record.

=== Cleveland Browns / Baltimore Ravens ===
While on a recruiting trip in January 1993, Ferentz received a message from NFL's Cleveland Browns inviting him to interview for their open offensive line position. Though Ferentz had never worked with Bill Belichick, Belichick wanted Ferentz for the job and hired him before the 1993 season. Ferentz and Belichick worked together for three seasons in Cleveland, reaching the playoffs in 1994. Undrafted free agent Orlando Brown signed with the team in 1993 and quickly became a regular starter at tackle under Ferentz's direction. Nick Saban was the defensive coordinator on the staff; he, Belichick, and Ferentz would become friends. Pat Hill was the assistant offensive line coach in Cleveland.

Belichick was fired after the 1995 season and a week after Browns owner Art Modell's decision to move the franchise to Baltimore was finalized. The Browns' players and some remaining staff, including Ferentz, moved to Baltimore before the 1996 season. Ferentz was named assistant head coach in addition to his offensive line responsibilities. New general manager Ozzie Newsome and Ferentz convinced Modell and head coach Ted Marchibroda to select UCLA offensive tackle Jonathan Ogden with its first round pick, fourth overall in the 1996 NFL draft, instead of Nebraska running back Lawrence Phillips. Ogden started his first season at guard, nearly making the Pro Bowl. "When he got to camp as a rookie, he might have made a handful of mistakes," Ferentz later said in 2013, "but he pretty quickly got to the point where if you asked him anything, he had the answer and more." Ogden was first-team 1997 NFL All-Pro and second-team 1998 NFL All-Pro under Ferentz, on his way to an 11-time Pro Bowl, Hall of Fame career.

== Iowa head coaching career ==
On December 2, 1998, Ferentz was hired as Iowa's 25th head football coach to replace the retiring Hayden Fry. Fry, a legendary coach at Iowa, had been privately battling cancer while his 1998 team had finished the season 3–8, with losses in each of their three rivalry games Florida defensive coordinator and Iowa alumnus Bob Stoops was the candidate favored by the search committee, though Stoops would opt for the Oklahoma job. Other candidates considered were assistant coaches Chuck Long and Don Patterson, and Kansas head coach Terry Allen.

From Fry's staff, Ferentz retained linebackers coach Bret Bielema, a strong recruiter, and quarterbacks coach Long, who would leave after the season to join Stoops at Oklahoma. He hired Fordham head coach Ken O'Keefe, who he had worked under at Worcester Academy, as his offensive coordinator and former Michigan State and Vanderbilt defensive coordinator Norm Parker in the same role. Both would serve as coordinators at Iowa until the 2011 season. Future NFL coaches Joe Philbin and Ron Aiken were added as offensive and defensive line coaches, respectively, on the recommendations of O'Keefe and Parker. Utah strength and conditioning coach Chris Doyle was hired in the same role.

=== First rebuild and early success (1999–2006) ===
Working with a depleted roster, the team struggled during Ferentz's first two seasons with a combined 4–19 record. In 1999, the team won one game, a home game against Northern Illinois, behind 174 rushing yards from sophomore running back Ladell Betts and an 87-yard return by LeVar Woods on a blocked NIU field goal attempt. Betts, running behind a young offensive line, would finish the season as team co-MVP and earned second-team All-Big Ten honors. Defensive back Matt Bowen also won second-team all conference honors, was team co-MVP, and would be selected in the 2000 NFL draft with tight end Austin Wheatley.

In 2000, Ferentz's Hawkeyes lost their first five games, including at No. 1 Nebraska, home against in-state rival Iowa State, and against No. 8 Kansas State, coached by Ferentz's former boss Bill Snyder. The Hawkeyes snapped a 13-game losing streak in Ferentz's first Big Ten conference victory against Michigan State, finishing 21–16 behind a rushing touchdown by Betts, a receiving touchdown by Kevin Kasper, and a 90-yard kick return by Kahlil Hill. After three more losses, Iowa would win a double overtime game at Penn State, with a Betts rushing touchdown and Nate Kaeding field goal sealing the win. In the final home game, Iowa upset No. 12 Northwestern at Kinnick Stadium, never trailing in the 27–17 victory. Ferentz's Hawkeyes finished 3–9 (3–5 in conference play), with Kasper and Woods winning team MVP awards.

After two seasons of rebuilding, the Hawkeyes earned their first bowl bid of the Ferentz era in the 2001 season, finishing the season 7–5 (4–4 in Big Ten play). Betts rushed for 1,060 yards and 10 touchdowns behind the offensive line whose young players had struggled the prior seasons but now were experienced in Ferentz's zone blocking scheme. The team defeated Minnesota for Ferentz's first Floyd of Rosedale Trophy, 42–24. The Hawkeyes beat Texas Tech in the Alamo Bowl, 19–16, in Ferentz's first bowl game appearance. Several players earned first or second-team Big Ten honors, including Betts, offensive linemen Eric Steinbach and David Porter, defensive end Aaron Kampman, and sophomore Bob Sanders, a lightly recruited but hard-hitting safety recommended to Ferentz out of high school by his mentor Joe Moore. Betts and Sanders won team MVP honors.

The 2002 season would prove to be memorable for Ferentz and the Hawkeyes. The team finished the regular season with an 11–1 record, finishing as co-conference champions with national champion Ohio State. Both teams finished 8–0 in conference play. The Hawkeye offensive line, featuring first-team all-Big Ten members Steinbach, Robert Gallery, and Bruce Nelson and second-team all-conference tackle Porter, paved the way for running back Fred Russell and the Iowa rushing attack. Playmaking skill position players, many of whom were recruited by Bielema, included senior quarterback Brad Banks, receivers Maurice Brown and C.J. Jones, and converted linebacker Dallas Clark at tight end. On defense, the front seven was effective against the Big Ten rushing attacks and consistently pressured opposing passers, protecting the young secondary. Sanders' big hits and playmaking from the safety position keyed the defense. The lone regular season loss came against in-state rival Iowa State, in which Seneca Wallace and the Cyclones came back from a 24–7 halftime deficit to defeat the Hawkeyes at Kinnick Stadium. The Hawkeyes won the rest of their regular season games, including an overtime victory at No. 12 Penn State and a thrilling back-and-forth victory against Purdue, in which the dual-threat Banks and nimble tight end Clark connected twice for crucial touchdowns at Kinnick. Two convincing conference wins followed, including a 44–16 rout of Michigan State, in which the Hawkeye defense stopped star Spartan receiver Charles Rogers' 14-game touchdown streak. The Hawkeyes achieved a thorough 34–9 road victory at No. 8 Michigan, with Sanders' hit and forced fumble on a Wolverine punt return sparking 24 unanswered points by the Hawkeyes in the second half. That game was followed by Ferentz's first win against rival Wisconsin, with the ninth-ranked Hawkeyes holding Wisconsin's rushing attack to 78 yards in a 20–3 victory at home. In the regular season finale at Minnesota, Iowa clinched at least a partial Big Ten title by forcing six Minnesota turnovers and rushing for 365 rushing yards en route to a 45–21 victory. The win was Iowa's tenth straight Big Ten win, the longest such streak since a 13-game streak in the 1920s. The game was also played in front of the largest crowd to ever see a Minnesota Golden Gophers football game at the Metrodome.

Quarterback Banks won the Davey O'Brien Award for best quarterback and finished second in the Heisman Trophy balloting to Carson Palmer of USC. Tight end Clark was that season's John Mackey Award winner, and placekicker Nate Kaeding was the Lou Groza Award winner. Ferentz was named Coach of the Year by the Associated Press for his efforts. Iowa received its first-ever BCS invitation, losing to USC in the 2003 Orange Bowl, 38–17.

Despite losing several seniors to graduation, the Hawkeyes compiled a 9–3 regular season record in 2003. They finished 5–3 in Big Ten play, losing three road games at No. 8 Ohio State, Michigan State, and No. 16 Purdue. Iowa defeated Iowa State for Ferentz's first Cy-Hawk victory. The Hawkeyes defeated No. 9 Michigan 30–27 at home on October 4. They defeated Florida 37–17 in the Outback Bowl on January 1, 2004, for their first January win since 1959. This earned the Hawkeyes a No. 8 national ranking in both the AP Poll and Coaches Poll at the end of the season. Offensive tackle Robert Gallery was that season's Outland Trophy winner; after the season, the Oakland Raiders chose him with the second overall pick in the 2004 NFL draft. Norm Parker's defense finished 7th-best in the country allowing 16.2 points per game.

Ferentz had to deal with multiple injuries to the Hawkeyes' running backs and the death of his father, John, during the 2004 season. Nevertheless, the Hawkeyes compiled a 9–2 regular season record, sharing the Big Ten Conference championship with Michigan after a 30–7 victory over Wisconsin on November 20. Shortly after his father's death, Ferentz and the Hawkeyes defeated Penn State 6–4, Iowa's first win without a touchdown since 1985. For the second time in three seasons, Ferentz was named the Big Ten Conference Coach of the Year. On January 1, 2005, they defeated LSU and his former coaching mate Nick Saban 30–25, after a thrilling 56-yard touchdown pass from true sophomore Drew Tate to Warren Holloway as time expired in the Capital One Bowl. This gave Ferentz his third straight ten-win season with the Hawkeyes and another No. 8 national ranking. Defenders Matt Roth, Abdul Hodge, and Sanders finished first-team all-Big Ten, while Jovon Johnson, Chad Greenway, and Howard Hodges earned second-team honors.

The Hawkeyes went 7–4 during the 2005 regular season. After early-season losses to Iowa State and Ohio State and close losses to Michigan and Northwestern, they finished the season with wins over Wisconsin and Minnesota to earn a second trip to the Outback Bowl to face Florida on January 2, 2006. This time, however, the Gators got a measure of revenge for their loss two years earlier, as the Hawkeyes lost to Florida, 31–24. Much was said about the officiating in this game, as there were 13 missed or bad calls made against the Hawkeyes that directly influenced the outcome. Officials later admitted their error in the game-deciding onside kick call, and that several other calls were under review. Linebacker Chad Greenway was selected by the Minnesota Vikings in the first round of the 2006 NFL draft.

Iowa started the 2006 season strong, winning their first four games before losing to top-ranked Ohio State. After a 5–1 start, however, the Hawkeyes collapsed down the stretch, losing five of their last six games. Iowa suffered shocking losses to Northwestern and Indiana and lost rivalry games with Wisconsin and Minnesota. The Hawkeyes finished the regular season with a 6–6 record and accepted an invitation to the 2006 Alamo Bowl, Iowa's sixth straight bowl game. Playing as nine-point underdogs to defending national champions Texas, Iowa lost the Alamo Bowl by a score of 26–24.

=== Second rebuild (2007–2011) ===
In 2007, Ferentz' Hawkeyes started 2–4 and lost their first three conference games. Highly ranked quarterback Jake Christensen struggled replacing the graduated Tate. An upset victory over No. 18 Illinois ended a nine-game conference losing streak for Iowa, and the Hawkeyes closed out the Big Ten season by winning their last three conference games. However, a disappointing loss in the season finale to Western Michigan dropped the Hawkeyes' season record to 6–6. Though Iowa was bowl-eligible, the Hawkeyes did not receive a bowl bid, snapping Iowa's streak of six consecutive bowl appearances. During the summer, several key Hawkeye players were arrested and dismissed from the program for theft and misdemeanor drug charges. A high-profile sexual case involving two Hawkeye players, accused by a female swimmer, began in November.

In 2008, Ferentz and the Hawkeyes started out strong with victories over his old team, Maine, Florida International, and rival Iowa State, but close losses to Pitt, Northwestern, and Michigan State left Iowa with a 3–3 record. Ferentz toggled between Christensen and sophomore Ricky Stanzi at quarterback, before deciding in favor of Stanzi mid-season. Iowa went on to win five of their next six games, including a 24–23 upset of #3 ranked and undefeated Penn State on a last-second field goal. After finishing the regular season at 8–4, Iowa accepted an invitation to the Outback Bowl where they defeated the South Carolina Gamecocks, 31–10. Running back Shonn Greene won the Doak Walker Award behind a vastly improved offensive line that featured All-American guard Seth Olsen, senior center Rob Bruggeman, and young tackle Bryan Bulaga.

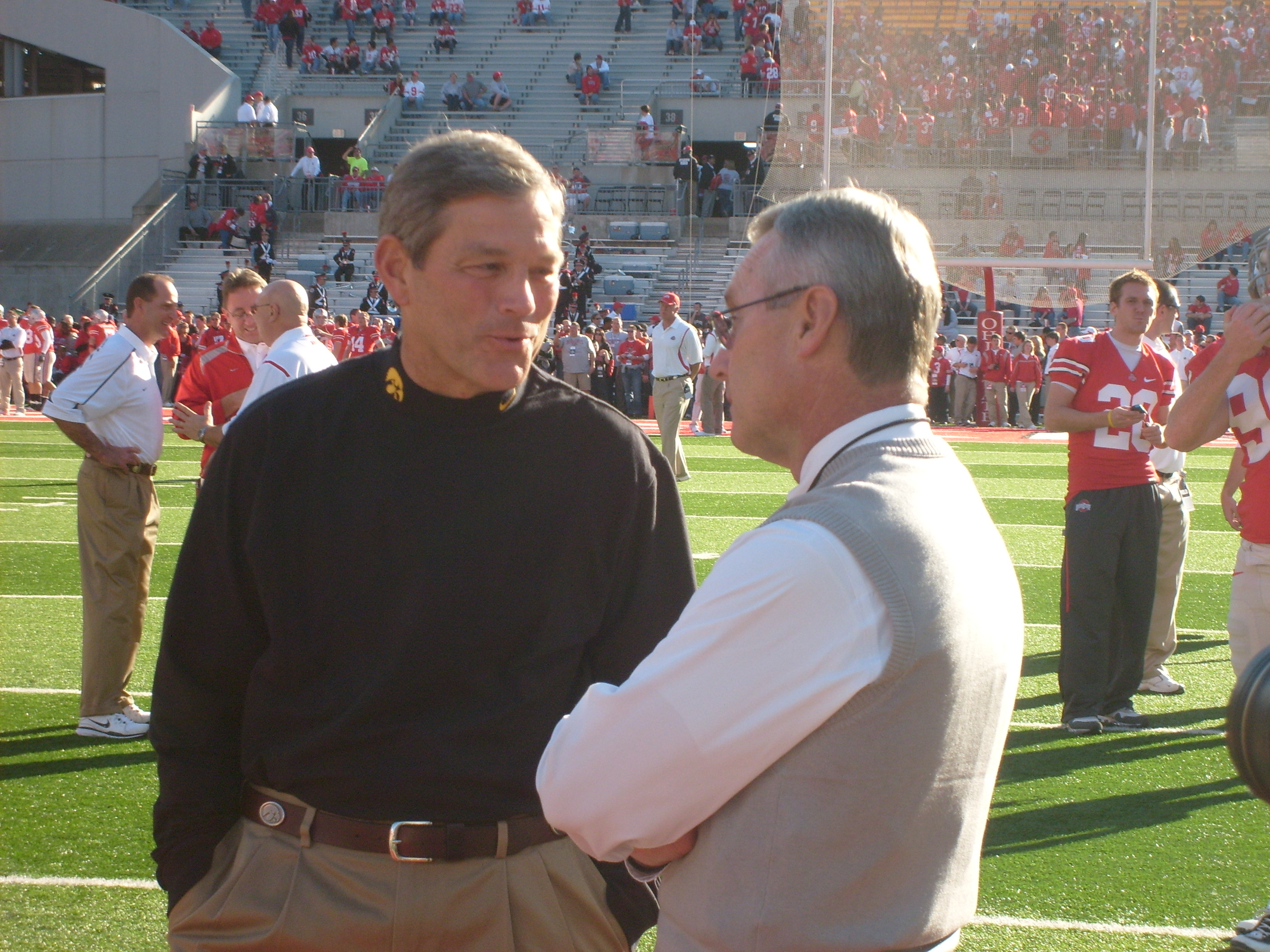
Ferentz and Ohio State coach Jim Tressel talk on the field before their teams played on November 14, 2009.

The 2009 Hawkeye football team got off to the best start in school history up to that point. Narrow home victories over Northern Iowa and Arkansas State coupled with double digit road wins over No. 5 Penn State and Wisconsin fueled a 7–0 start. Ferentz' 2009 Hawks became the first Iowa team to win eight games to start a season by winning at Michigan State, 15–13, with a touchdown pass on the final play of the game from Stanzi to Marvin McNutt. After defeating Indiana to run their record to 9–0, the Hawks lost quarterback Stanzi to injury in an upset loss to Northwestern. Iowa then lost the de facto Big Ten championship game at Ohio State, 27–24, in overtime. The Hawkeyes shut out Minnesota, 12–0, to finish the regular season with a 10–2 record and were selected for their second BCS bowl game under Ferentz by being invited to the 2010 Orange Bowl. Stanzi returned, and Iowa defeated Georgia Tech, 24–14, to earn the school's first BCS bowl win and their first victory in a major bowl since the 1959 Rose Bowl. Iowa finished with an 11–2 record that tied the school record for victories in a season and the Hawkeyes earned No. 7 rankings in both the AP Poll and Coaches Poll, their highest finish since the 1960 season. Tackle Bulaga was selected by the Green Bay Packers in the first round of the 2010 NFL draft.

In 2010, pre-season expectations ran high before a disappointing 8–5 season. The Hawkeyes began the season ranked 9 in the AP poll, returning key players Stanzi, McNutt, Adrian Clayborn, Tyler Sash, Derrell Johnson-Koulianos, and Karl Klug. The Hawkeyes defeated two ranked conference foes at home, No. 22 Penn State and No. 5 Michigan State, before losing their final three regular season games. Ferentz and the Hawkeyes defeated the 14th-ranked Missouri Tigers in the 2010 Insight Bowl. Six Hawkeyes were selected in the 2011 NFL draft, including the All-American Clayborn in the first round.

The inconsistent 2011 Hawkeyes finished 7–6 (4–4 Big Ten), defeating ranked Michigan 24–16 but losing to unranked rivals Minnesota and Iowa State. Against Pitt, the Hawkeyes overcame a 17-point deficit in the fourth quarter. Another offensive tackle, Riley Reiff, was selected in the first round, this time by the Detroit Lions in the 2012 NFL draft. The Hawkeyes lost to Oklahoma, coached by Hawkeye alum Bob Stoops in the 2011 Insight Bowl.

In the 2011 offseason, thirteen football players ended up in University Hospital with extreme cases of rhabdomyolysis following a workout administered by strength coach Chris Doyle. Athletic director Gary Barta and Iowa tried to keep it under wraps, issuing a press release and state that no further comment would be forthcoming. After a later press conference was convened after national scrutiny, Barta, head coach Ferentz, and Doyle were not in attendance, instead letting a parent of an injured player and UI doctor answer questions. Ferentz gave Doyle the "Assistant Coach of the Year" award, an award that had never been given before or in the 10 years after. One of the injured players eventually sued and settled for around $15,000.

=== Staff changes and Rose Bowl (2012–2016) ===
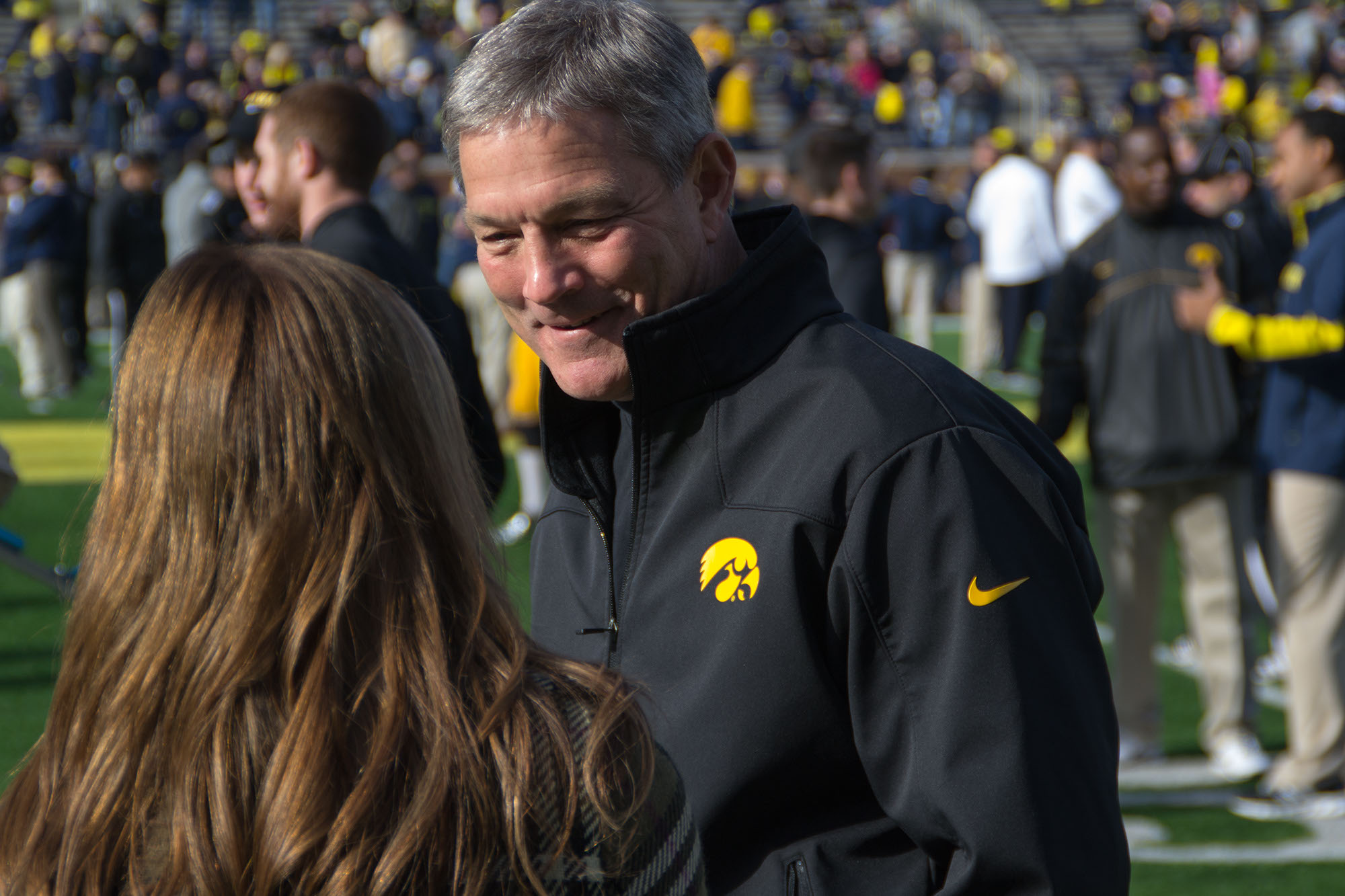
Ferentz during the 2012 season at Michigan Stadium

Longtime coordinators Norm Parker and Ken O'Keefe departed their roles after the 2011 season. Parker retired, and O'Keefe joined former Ferentz assistant Joe Philbin's Miami Dolphins staff. Ferentz hired former Texas offensive coordinator Greg Davis to run the offense and promoted longtime defensive backs coach Phil Parker to coordinate the defense. Kirk Ferentz's son Brian was hired as offensive line coach, while longtime offensive line coach Reese Morgan began coaching the defensive line. Former player LeVar Woods, who had been Ferentz's administrative assistant since 2008, was promoted to linebackers coach.

The 2012 Iowa season saw struggles on both sides of the ball. In Davis' first year, the team struggled to mesh his spread concepts with Ferentz's pro-style approach. Quarterback James Vandenberg's production fell from 25 touchdowns the previous system to only 7 in 2012, with 8 interceptions. Iowa finished 4–8, 2–6 in conference play. The Hawkeyes lost their final 6 games after starting tackles Brandon Scherff and Andrew Donnal both suffered season-ending injuries against Penn State. The 4–8 record stands as the worst Iowa under Ferentz since his second season in 2000.

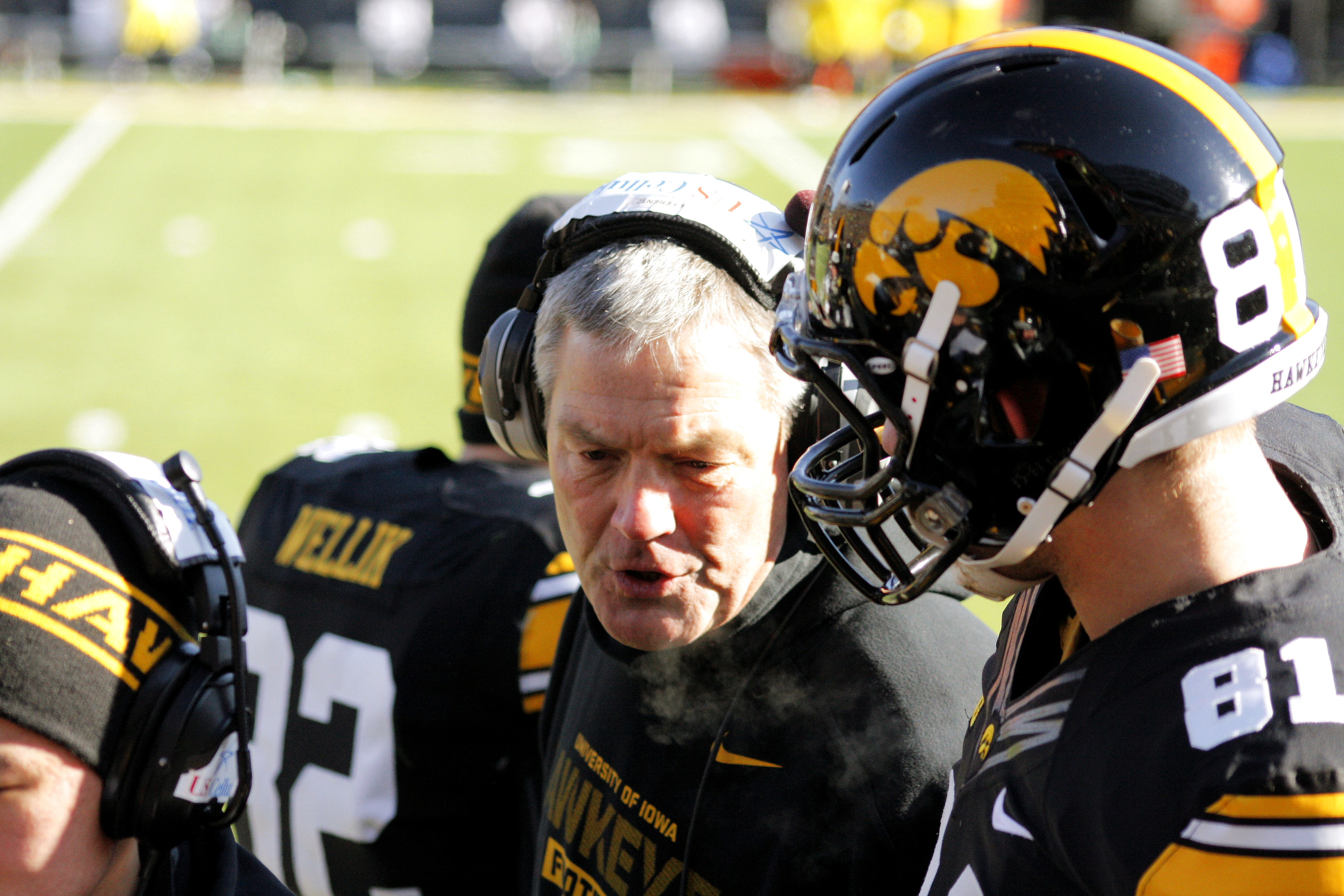
Ferentz at Kinnick Stadium during a 2013 victory over Michigan.

In 2013, the rushing attack and defense improved, as did the Hawkeyes' record to 8–5. Tackles Scherff and Brett van Sloten, guard Donnal, center Austin Blythe, and tight end C.J. Fiedorowicz paved the way for converted fullback Mark Weisman. On defense, senior linebackers Christian Kirksey, Anthony Hitchens, and James Morris under new position coach Jim Reid led the unit to 6th-best in the nation in total defense.

2014 saw disappointing results, with Ferentz's Hawkeyes finishing 7–6, 4–4 in Big Ten play but losing all four rivalry games. Two quarterbacks, C.J. Beathard and Jake Rudock, started games for the Hawkeyes. A humbling defeat to Tennessee in the Taxslayer Bowl resulted in Ferentz naming Beathard the starter for 2015 and Rudock transferring to Michigan under new coach Jim Harbaugh. Tackle Brandon Scherff won the Outland Trophy, the second Iowa winner under Ferentz, and was selected in the first round of the 2015 NFL draft.

The 2015 season proved to be one of the best in university history. Iowa went undefeated in the regular season and recorded 12 wins, the most in school history. Additionally, a team that went 0–4 in trophy games the year before, went 4–0 and won the Big Ten Conference West championship, the first in school history. Ferentz was also named Big Ten coach of the year for the fourth time while at Iowa. Defensive back Desmond King won first-team All-American honors and won the Jim Thorpe Award. The Hawkeyes fell 16–13 in the 2015 Big Ten Football Championship Game against Michigan State. Despite the loss, the Hawkeyes accepted an invitation to the 2016 Rose Bowl, Ferentz's third Rose Bowl with Iowa, first as head coach, and it marks the first trip to Pasadena for the Hawkeyes in 25 years. In the Rose Bowl, the Hawkeyes were throttled, 45–16, by a Christian McCaffrey-led Stanford team. With their latest Rose Bowl defeat, the Hawkeyes fell to 0–4, with a combined score of 164–78, since their last victory in 1959.

In 2016, Iowa began the season ranked No. 17, though lost in their third game to FCS North Dakota State. Other losses were followed by an upset of No. 3 Michigan on a last-second field goal by Keith Duncan. The Hawkeyes closed their Big Ten season by defeating rival No. 17 Nebraska, 40–10. Iowa finishing with an 8–4 regular season record. The Iowa offensive line was awarded the Joe Moore Award. This award was especially significant because Moore was a lifelong mentor to Ferentz since their days at Upper St. Clair. Iowa was selected to play in the Outback Bowl for the fifth time under Ferentz, where they lost to the Florida Gators 30–3. Following the loss to the Gators the Hawkeyes fell to 0–5 in their last five bowl games, getting outscored 172–75 in those contests.

=== Scandal and on-field success (2017–present) ===
Offensive coordinator Greg Davis retired after the 2016 season, and was replaced by offensive line coach Brian Ferentz, Kirk's son. Other staff changes saw North Dakota State offensive coordinator Tim Polasek hired as offensive line coach and Kelvin Bell hired as assistant defensive line coach and recruiting coordinator. Ken O'Keefe returned to act as quarterbacks coach.

The 2017 season saw similar results to 2016. Iowa got off to a great start but was again plagued with several injuries. The team went undefeated in non-conference play and all but two of their Big Ten losses were by just one score (38–14 vs. Wisconsin, 24–15 vs. Purdue). Like the prior season, Iowa went 3–1 in trophy games, and finished with eight wins. On November 4, they upset No. 3 Ohio State, exploding for 55 points in a 55–24 victory. Iowa played in the Pinstripe Bowl, the 15th bowl under Ferentz. After trailing early, the Hawkeyes dominated the second half and won their first bowl game since 2010. The victory tied Hayden Fry in Iowa career wins (143), and surpassed his number of bowl wins at the university. Cornerback Josh Jackson finished first-team All-American and won the Jack Tatum Award and Big Ten Defensive Back of the Year award. Linebacker Josey Jewell also finished first-team All-American, won Big Ten Defensive Player of the Year and the Jack Lambert Award.

The 2018 season saw a 9–4 record, but several close Big Ten Conference losses that cost the Hawkeyes another trip to Indianapolis. Iowa started strong, winning its three non-conference games, and once again was able to keep three of the four rivalry trophies in Iowa City. However, losses to Penn State, Purdue and Northwestern in consecutive weeks defined the season. Iowa played in the Outback Bowl for the sixth time, holding on to defeat Mississippi State 27–22 for Ferentz's fifth January bowl win and eighth overall bowl victory. T.J. Hockenson won the Mackey Award for the nation's best tight end, and safety Amani Hooker won the Tatum-Woodson Defensive Back of the Year award.

Ferentz's 2019 was another successful season at Iowa. The Hawkeyes started 4–0, and went undefeated against non-conference opponents. After back-to-back losses against Big Ten powerhouses Michigan and Penn State it looked like it could be a lost season for the team. Iowa rallied, winning five of their last six games but yet another loss to archrival and Big Ten powerhouse Wisconsin meant that a Big Ten West division title eluded the program. The Hawkeyes played in the 2019 Holiday Bowl against USC. In the first match-up between the Trojans and Hawkeyes since the 2003 Orange Bowl Iowa outplayed USC in a shootout 49–24. The victory gave the program ten wins for the sixth time under Ferentz. The team was also able to accomplish a distinction that hadn't been done since 1991, they both started and finished the season in the top 25 national rankings without dropping out. Tackle Tristan Wirfs went 13th overall in the 2020 NFL draft.

On June 6, 2020, Ferentz placed strength coach Chris Doyle on paid administrative leave after a number of former players identified Doyle and Brian Ferentz as contributing to a program culture that was hostile toward black student-athletes. On June 15, Doyle was released from the program after a 21-year stint. On July 27, 2020, ESPN published an article citing instances of racial inequities levied against black players throughout Ferentz's tenure as a head coach. "I did ask multiple players if they feel like I'm part of the problem or if they feel like we can't move forward with me here," Ferentz said in a news conference in early June. "That's not what I've heard thus far. But my commitment is to us having a good program and having a healthy team and improving the environment." Brian Ferentz was retained on staff.

In the COVID-19-shortened 2020 season, they won six games, including defeating Penn State for the first time since 2010.And went 3–0 in trophy contests, defeating Wisconsin for the first time since 2015. Ferentz tested positive for COVID-19 on December 18, 2020. The Hawkeyes were scheduled to play in the Music City Bowl, which would have been the first time Iowa had played Missouri since 10 years prior in the 2010 Insight Bowl. However, the game was cancelled three days prior to the match-up over virus concerns.

The 2021 season was a mostly memorable year for Iowa. The team rose to a No. 2 ranking after jumping out to a 6–0 start and defeating No. 3 Penn State in Kinnick Stadium. Two lopsided losses followed however. The Hawkeyes won their last four games and with a Minnesota upset over Wisconsin earned their second Big Ten West Division Title. Iowa lost to Michigan in the Big Ten Championship game, putting their record at 10–3 entering the Citrus Bowl against Kentucky, the 18th bowl under Ferentz. The Hawkeyes fell to the Wildcats 20–17 in the bowl game.

The 2022 season was a roller-coaster ride for Iowa. Poor offensive execution, player development, and playcalling led the offense to rank among the worst in the nation. The team only started out 3–4, one of the worst openings under Ferentz. Despite all of the shortcomings, the team won their next four games and even had a chance to play in the Big Ten Championship in back-to-back years. However, Iowa's first loss to Nebraska since 2014 kept them out of a rematch with eventual conference champion Michigan. The team was selected in a rematch with Kentucky in the Music City Bowl, the 19th bowl under Ferentz. Iowa prevailed, giving the coach his 10th bowl victory. The 21–0 victory over Kentucky marked the second bowl shutout produced by the Hawkeyes in school history and the first since 1996.

The 2023 season was a near mirror-image of the 2021 season. The team found early success, with a 6–1 start with the one loss being to #7 Penn State. The Hawkeyes also went 3–1 in trophy games, though a controversial loss to Minnesota fully exposed how the offense had not improved from the previous season. Dominant defense and great special teams play led to Ferentz's third Big Ten West title, though Michigan had little difficulty defeating Iowa once again in the championship game. Also, like 2021, the team suffered a 35–0 loss in the Citrus Bowl to Tennessee.

The 2024 campaign was plagued with close losses that kept it from being a great season. Ferentz hired Tim Lester to replace Brian Ferentz as offensive coordinator. Three of the five defeats were effectively decided by a field goal. The program once again won three trophy contests and nearly had an untarnished home record yet took a step back in the newly expanded conference. Ferentz moved into second all-time for wins as a Big Ten coach with a victory over Washington. Running back Kaleb Johnson was a consensus All-American. The Hawkeyes finished with a 8–4 regular season record. The season ended with a 27–24 loss to Missouri in the Music City Bowl.

The 2025 season was a really good year for Iowa, however like the previous season close losses marred it from being an outstanding one. Ferentz moved into first place in overall victories as a Big Ten coach and the team won three trophy games, but each of their four losses were by just one possession in games where the Hawkeyes had a lead or tie at some point of the contest, including against eventual national champion Indiana. The offensive line won the second Joe Moore Award during the Ferentz era and the team won their first bowl game since 2022 in a shootout with Vanderbilt.

=== Records ===
Ferentz notched his 100th career win at Iowa with a double-overtime victory over the Michigan State Spartans in East Lansing on October 13, 2012. He became the all-time wins leader in school history, (144) with a victory over Northern Illinois on September 1, 2018, and has led Iowa to 19 bowl games, more bowls than any other Iowa coach. Later that season Ferentz recorded his 150th Iowa career win with a blowout triumph over Big Ten foe Illinois on November 17, 2018. When Joe Paterno was fired from Penn State in 2011 Ferentz became the dean of Big Ten football coaches, as the longest tenured coach in the respective sport. With the retirement of Virginia Tech coach Frank Beamer after the 2015 season, Ferentz became tied with Bob Stoops for the longest tenured head coach at the FBS level. In June 2017, Ferentz became the longest tenured coach with the sudden retirement of Bob Stoops. Ferentz recorded his 200th win at Iowa with a victory over Washington on October 12, 2024. This win also moved him solely into second place in victories as a Big Ten coach. A dominant victory over UMass on September 13, 2025 moved him into first place in overall wins as a Big Ten head coach. With a win over Vanderbilt on December 31, 2025, Ferentz holds the record for most Bowl wins as a Big Ten coach.

== Contract extensions and NFL opportunities ==
Several major college and NFL teams have considered Ferentz as a candidate for their head coaching jobs. However, Ferentz has publicly declined any interest in other coaching positions, opting to stay at Iowa. On February 12, 2009, Ferentz and Iowa athletics director Gary Barta agreed to a new contract extension that keeps Ferentz at Iowa until 2020.

On January 2, 2006, the head coaches of five NFL teams, Green Bay, St. Louis, Houston, New Orleans, and Minnesota, were fired. There was renewed speculation that Ferentz would be offered a head coaching job with one of those professional franchises. But such speculation was soon put to rest when Ferentz stated that he was still happy with his job at Iowa, and that he had no plans to leave. On June 2, 2006, Ferentz became the highest paid coach in the Big Ten and third highest in college football when he was given a restructured contract that boosted his annual salary to $2.7 million.

Following the 2006 NFL season, rumors circulated that Ferentz may have been in consideration for the Pittsburgh Steelers' head coaching job after Bill Cowher stepped down. However, before Cowher's departure, Ferentz was asked about his possible interest in the position, and stated: "I know that staff pretty well and they've got some good guys in that building. My guess is that's where they would go. But I'm not interested, and I doubt they are, either. I've got a great job right here." The Steelers job eventually went to Mike Tomlin.

In 2008, Ferentz was again rumored to be a candidate for an NFL head coaching job, particularly as successor to Romeo Crennel for the Cleveland Browns.

In January 2009, rumors surfaced citing Ferentz as a potential candidate to be hired as head coach in place of Herman Edwards soon after the hiring of former New England Patriots VP of Player Personnel Scott Pioli as the new GM of the Kansas City Chiefs. However, the Chiefs eventually hired Todd Haley, and Ferentz received a contract extension to remain at Iowa through 2020. In December 2011, rumors again surfaced citing Ferentz as a potential candidate to replace Haley. Similar rumors surfaced a year later in December 2012. Ferentz has said that there was no reason to leave Iowa as Iowa has everything he needed.

In 2016 he signed an extension through the 2026 season, and in 2022 he signed an extension through the 2029 season. He is currently the 18th highest-paid coach in college football.

== Coaching style ==
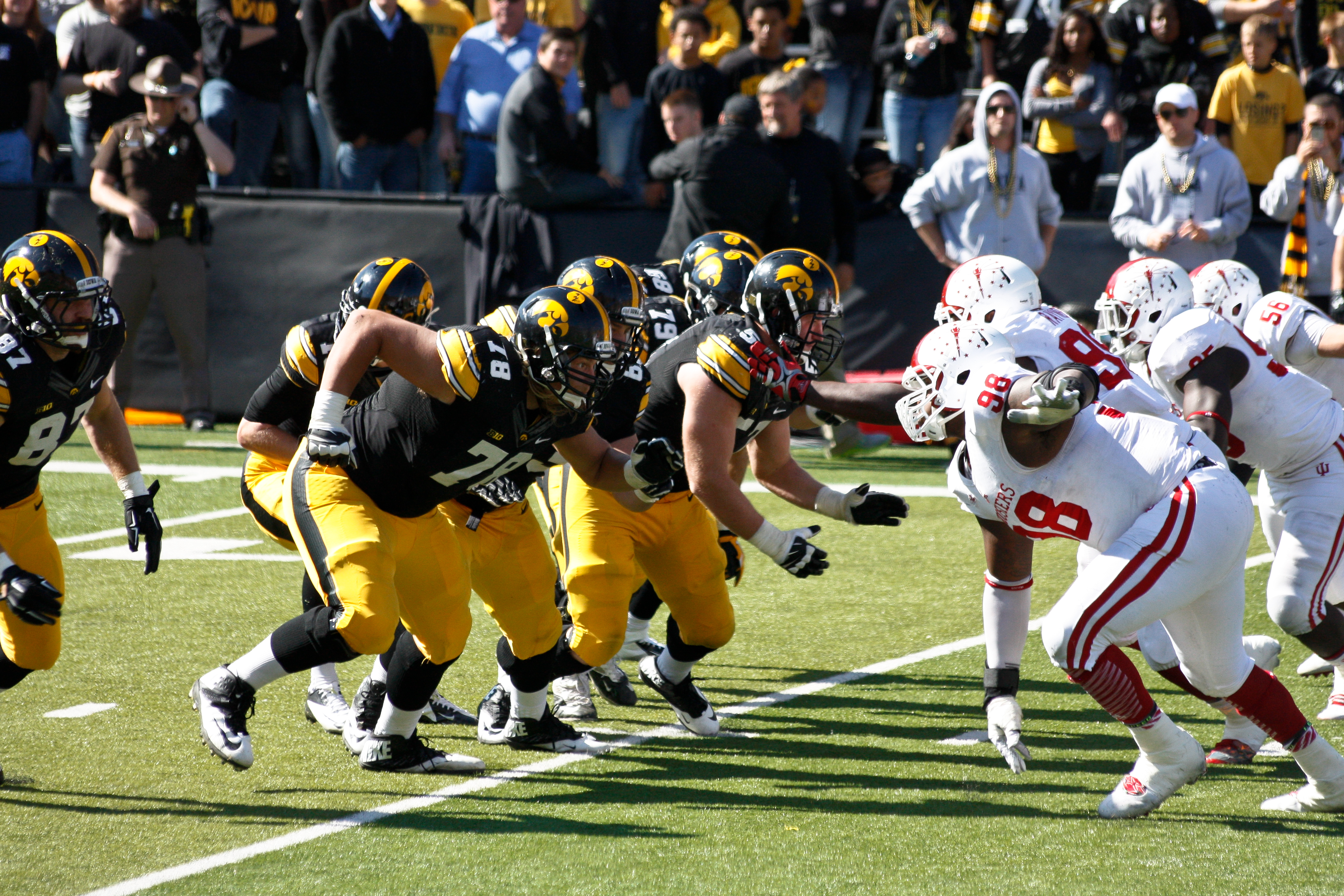
The Iowa offensive line stepping in unison on a zone run.

As both offensive line coach and head coach, Ferentz has exclusively used a zone-blocking scheme on offense. The scheme originated with Alex Gibbs and Mike Shanahan on the Denver Broncos teams of the late 1990s, and is used by current NFL coaches Kyle Shanahan, Kevin Stefanski, Klint Kubiak, and Sean McVay. The scheme involves quicker, more mobile offensive lineman than the gap (power) blocking schemes used by programs such as Barry Alvarez's Wisconsin. Ferentz's offenses often use fullbacks and tight ends as supplemental blockers. The inside and especially outside zone plays are the hallmark of Ferentz's Iowa teams, identifiable by the entire offensive line slanting in one direction. Play-action passes and bootlegs based on those runs add downfield danger. When Ferentz took over at Iowa, the zone scheme was rare in the Big Ten, whose defensive lines and linebackers typically were bulkier in order to withstand the power running schemes, giving the Hawkeyes an advantage. However, more teams in the conference started using zone after Rich Rodriguez brought a zone read look to Michigan, which was replicated by several teams in the conference. Rule changes surrounding cut-blocking have also limited the effectiveness of the Ferentz's scheme, which has remained mostly static since his hire in 1998.

Kirk and his son Brian are adherents to 'complementary football,' a theory that offenses and defenses should complement one another and that stresses the importance of field position. "We've got to know what kind of game we're going to be in," Brian Ferentz said to a reporter in the summer of 2022. "Look at the worst defenses in the league. How often does it correlate with one of the better offenses in the league? More than you think. You just have to know who you are. You have to play complementary football." Ferentz had previously described his father's philosophy, saying the offense "needs to protect our defense and keep them out of bad positions. That means we need to protect the football. We need to change field position," adding "we need to score as many points as we can with the opportunities we have."

== Scandals and off-field issues ==
=== Iowa football racial bias ===
During the 2020 racial unrest in the United States after the murder of George Floyd by police, Black former Iowa football players called for changes within the program. Former Iowa offensive lineman James Daniels tweeted "If the team collectively decides to kneel, this will bring about a cultural change for both Iowa football and the state of Iowa which I believe is long overdue!!!" Two days later, Daniels followed up with a second tweet asserting "there are too many racial disparities in the Iowa football program. Black players have been treated unfairly for far too long." Several other Iowa players added to Daniels' claims, citing Strength and Conditioning coach Chris Doyle and offensive coordinator Brian Ferentz as two of the leading causes of racial disparities in Iowa football. Former Iowa defensive lineman Jaleel Johnson wrote on Twitter "Coach Doyle is the problem in that building. And so is Brian Ferentz.... things won't progress until those two fix themselves. They know they're a problem."

An external review from the law firm Husch Blackwell corroborated the players' complaints of racial bias in the Iowa football program. "In sum, the program's rules perpetuated racial or cultural biases and diminished the value of cultural diversity," the report read. "The program over-monitored players to the point that they experienced heightened anxiety and maintained a culture that allowed a small group of coaches to demean players." The report stated that several current and former players believed that some coaches used the program's foundation of discipline and accountability "to perpetuate an environment that bullies and demeans athletes, especially Black athletes." Ferentz responded to the report, stating "this review brings us face to face with allegations of uneven treatment, where our culture that mandated uniformity caused many Black players to feel they were unable to show up as their authentic selves," Ferentz said. "I want to apologize for the pain and frustration they felt at a time when I was trusted to help each of them become a better player and a better person."

Chris Doyle was placed on administrative leave and later terminated, receiving 15 months' salary (approximately $556,000). After a review with athletic director Gary Barta, Kirk's son Brian Ferentz continued his role for Iowa football without suspension, leave, or fine. In the summer of 2020, Ferentz created a diversity committee, made up of former players. During the 2021 season, chair of the committee David Porter recommended Ferentz retire and Iowa hire a new football coach. Ferentz dissolved the committee in January 2022 with plans to restructure, stating he was considering what a new committee might look like. When asked about Porter's recommendation, Ferentz stated "I read it and that's his opinion. There's not much to react to other than I have a different opinion. My intention is like long-term and big picture, not short-term. Everyone is allowed to have an opinion." Ferentz ended up permanently dissolving the committee, instead working with University DEI staff.

In October 2020, eight Black former Iowa football players filed a federal discrimination lawsuit against the university, seeking $20 million in compensation and for athletics director Barta, head coach Kirk Ferentz, and assistant coach Brian Ferentz to be fired over what they allege was intentional racial discrimination during their time at Iowa. Players included running back Akrum Wadley. In March 2023, a settlement between the plaintiffs for 12 former players and the attorneys for the University of Iowa was reached. Per the agreement, the state board of regents would pay $4,175,000 to the former players, in addition to court costs. Approximately $2 million of the settlement money was paid by Iowa taxpayers. Head coach Kirk Ferentz, offensive coordinator Brian Ferentz, athletic director Gary Barta and former football strength coach Chris Doyle were dismissed as defendants with prejudice. Ferentz released a statement saying he was "greatly disappointed" that the lawyers representing Iowa settled the case. "These discussions took place entirely without the knowledge or consent of the coaches who were named in the lawsuit," Ferentz said on March 6, 2023. "In fact, the parties initially named disagree with the decision to settle, fully believing the case would have been dismissed with prejudice before trial."

=== 2007 off-field legal troubles ===
Between April 2007 and August 2008, 18 Iowa football players were arrested for various offenses, ranging from alcohol-related issues to two players that were accused of sexual assault. Nine players ended up being dismissed or leaving from program in that time period. On August 20, 2007, days before the start of football season, two wide receivers, including Iowa's top returning receiver Dominique Douglas, were charged with stealing credit cards and ordering thousands of dollars' worth of hats and other merchandise. A warrant was issued the next day for another player, Arvell Nelson, for failing to appear for a traffic ticket. Douglas was arrested weeks later for shoplifting DVDs, and suspended by the team. Nelson and wide receiver James Cleveland were later dismissed for drug charges. Ferentz issued a curfew for his players after long snapper Clint Huntrods was arrested for public urination; the curfew was extended after safety Lance Tillison was arrested for drunk driving after the Iowa State game. "My high school son would be upset about this curfew, to put in that perspective," said Ferentz in September. "Enough is enough. You hate to treat anybody like a grade-school kid, but that is the way it goes." Ferentz would also state the "bottom line is it just leads me to believe I've probably done a poor job of communicating. It's very disappointing. So, we'll handle that and move on."

After the season, Ferentz defended how his program handled player conduct. He stated said those incidents forced him to re-examine his and the coaching staff's approach to keeping players out of legal trouble. He mentioned monitoring players, educating players, and relying on player leadership as areas that needed improvement. "Basically everything that's come to my desk or I've passed on to Gary, I think has been handled the right way," Ferentz said in January 2008. "If it's discipline, we try to do the right thing. Are we perfect? No, but we've been pretty upfront." Iowa would hire a director of player development before the 2008 season to help keep players out of trouble.

In May 2008, warrants were issued for the arrest of two Iowa players in connection with a sexual assault on campus that occurred on October 14, 2007. The alleged incident involved the players assaulting a UI swimmer while she was unconscious. The university investigation began in November 2007, lasting nearly two semesters and causing severe public scrutiny over the apparent bungling and lack of transparency. The victim's mother sent two letters sent to school president Sally Mason, accusing university officials of encouraging her daughter, an Iowa student-athlete, to pursue resolution "informally" and within the athletic department. She said her family was told that it would be faster than the "arduous" process of involving police. Ferentz, athletic director Gary Barta, and other university officials met with the victim, according to the mother's letter. The first letter, sent in November 2007, was not released by the university, and the victim's mother released it to the Iowa City Press-Citizen herself. The letters caused the Iowa board of regents to meet, and the victim eventually filed criminal complaints. Both players were removed from the team within days of the incident. Ferentz was asked about the scandal several times at Big Ten media days, responding "there was suggestion made of a cover-up, and I know that's the media's job, that's the world we live in right now," He added that "I take great exception to that, and I think if a logical person looked at this, for anybody involved to be in a cover-up here, basically you'd have to be morally bankrupt, and secondly you'd have to be fairly ignorant." A later University of Iowa probe concluded that the university mishandled, but did not cover-up, the assault.

The two players, defensive backs Cedric Everson and Abe Satterfield, were accused of second-degree sexual abuse, with Satterfield also being accused of third-degree sexual abuse. In 2010, Satterfield signed a plea deal, pleading guilty to assault with intent to inflict serious injury and was fined $625, with a suspended prison sentence due to his testimony against Everson and his lack of previous criminal record. Everson was found guilty of assault in January 2011 by a jury. This was the lowest level of offense he faced, with a maximum of 30 days in jail and no registry as a sex offender. Everson would eventually see one week of prison time.

=== Rhabdomyolysis ===
In 2011, thirteen football players ended up in University Hospital with extreme cases of rhabdomyolysis, a serious muscle condition, following an offseason workout administered by strength coach Chris Doyle. Athletic director Gary Barta and Iowa tried to keep it under wraps, issuing a press release and state that no further comment would be forthcoming. National scrutiny rose, and later another press conference was convened. Barta, head coach Kirk Ferentz, and Doyle were not in attendance, instead letting a UI doctor and Biff Poggi, parent of injured player Jim Poggi, answer questions. Ferentz later relented and faced the media, admitting his error in a February press conference. Ferentz defended Doyle, stating he was "probably the most sought-after coach that I've ever been around," adding that "you couldn't ask for a better person to head that [strength and conditioning] up." Ferentz later gave Doyle the "Assistant Coach of the Year" award, an award that had never been given before or in the 10 years after.

A university conducted an internal investigation, finding that the preparation and response by the coaching staff was lacking. One of the injured players eventually sued and settled for around $15,000.

== Personal life ==
Ferentz and his wife, Mary, have five children; eldest son Brian was a coach for the New England Patriots from 2008 to 2011. His son James was a second team All-Big Ten center in 2012. Additionally, James became a Super Bowl Champion with the Denver Broncos following the 2015 season and again following the 2018 season with the New England Patriots.

== Head coaching record ==
Year	Team	Overall	Conference	Standing	Bowl/playoffs	Coaches^{#}	AP^{°}
Maine Black Bears (Yankee Conference) (1990–1992)
1990	Maine	3–8	2–6	T–7th			
1991	Maine	3–8	2–6	T–7th			
1992	Maine	6–5	4–4	T–5th			
Maine:		12–21	8–16				
Iowa Hawkeyes (Big Ten Conference) (1999–present)
1999	Iowa	1–10	0–8	11th			
2000	Iowa	3–9	3–5	8th			
2001	Iowa	7–5	4–4	T–4th	W Alamo		
2002	Iowa	11–2	8–0	T–1st	L Orange^{†}	8	8
2003	Iowa	10–3	5–3	T–4th	W Outback	8	8
2004	Iowa	10–2	7–1	T–1st	W Capital One	8	8
2005	Iowa	7–5	5–3	T–3rd	L Outback		
2006	Iowa	6–7	2–6	T–8th	L Alamo		
2007	Iowa	6–6	4–4	T–5th			
2008	Iowa	9–4	5–3	T–4th	W Outback	20	20
2009	Iowa	11–2	6–2	T–2nd	W Orange^{†}	7	7
2010	Iowa	8–5	4–4	T–4th	W Insight		
2011	Iowa	7–6	4–4	4th (Legends)	L Insight		
2012	Iowa	4–8	2–6	T–5th (Legends)			
2013	Iowa	8–5	5–3	T–2nd (Legends)	L Outback		
2014	Iowa	7–6	4–4	4th (West)	L TaxSlayer		
2015	Iowa	12–2	8–0	1st (West)	L Rose^{†}	10	9
2016	Iowa	8–5	6–3	T–2nd (West)	L Outback		
2017	Iowa	8–5	4–5	T–3rd (West)	W Pinstripe		
2018	Iowa	9–4	5–4	T–2nd (West)	W Outback		25
2019	Iowa	10–3	6–3	3rd (West)	W Holiday	15	15
2020	Iowa	6–2	6–2	2nd (West)	Music City (Note: The 2020 Music City Bowl was canceled due to COVID-19 issues.)	15	16
2021	Iowa	10–4	7–2	1st (West)	L Citrus	23	23
2022	Iowa	8–5	5–4	T–2nd (West)	W Music City		
2023	Iowa	6–4	6–2	1st (West)	L Citrus	22	24
2024	Iowa	8–5	6–3	T–5th	L Music City		
2025	Iowa	9–4	6–3	6th	W ReliaQuest	17	17
2026	Iowa	9–2	6–2				
Iowa:		218–130	139–93				
Total:		230–151					
National championship Conference title Conference division title or championship game berth
^{†}Indicates BCS or CFP / New Years' Six bowl.; ^{#}Rankings from final Coaches Poll.; ^{°}Rankings from final AP Poll.

== See also ==
- List of college football career coaching wins leaders
