= James Ferentz =

American football player and coach (born 1989)

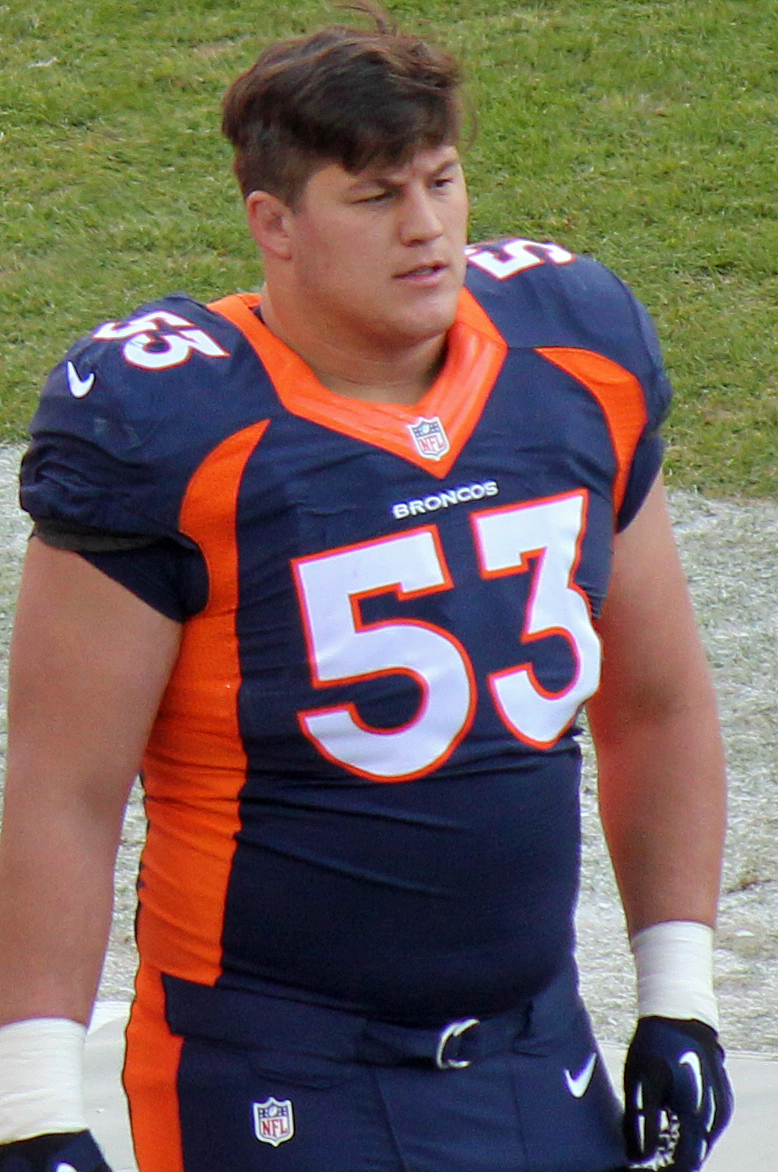
- Ferentz with the Denver Broncos in 2015

Houston Texans
- Title: Tight ends coach

Personal information
- Born: June 5, 1989 (age 37); Iowa City, Iowa, U.S.
- Listed height: 6 ft 2 in (1.88 m)
- Listed weight: 290 lb (132 kg)

Career information
- Position: Center (No. 53, 66, 65)
- High school: Iowa City
- College: Iowa (2008–2012)
- NFL draft: 2014: undrafted

Career history

Playing
- Houston Texans (2014–2015)*; Denver Broncos (2015–2016); New England Patriots (2017–2023)
- * Offseason or practice squad member only

Coaching
- New York Giants (2024–2025) Assistant offensive line coach; Houston Texans (2026–present) Tight ends coach

Awards and highlights
- 2× Super Bowl champion (50, LIII); Second-team All-Big Ten (2012)

Career NFL statistics
- Games played: 61
- Games started: 10
- Stats at Pro Football Reference

James Ferentz (born June 5, 1989) is an American former football center who is currently the tight ends coach for the Houston Texans of the National Football League (NFL). He was signed by the Houston Texans as an undrafted free agent in 2014, and also played in the National Football League (NFL) for the Denver Broncos and New England Patriots (for whom he won Super Bowls 50 and LIII). He played college football for the Iowa Hawkeyes.

== Early life ==
Ferentz played football at Iowa City High School in Iowa City, Iowa. He also wrestled earning second place at the Iowa high school wrestling tournament his senior year.

== College career ==
Ferentz attended and played college football at Iowa from 2008–2012. He was named second-team All-Big Ten while at the University of Iowa.

== Professional career ==
Pre-draft measurables
Height	Weight	Arm length	Hand span	Wingspan	40-yard dash	10-yard split	20-yard split	20-yard shuttle	Three-cone drill	Vertical jump	Broad jump	Bench press
6 ft 2 5/8 in (1.90 m)	284 lb (129 kg)	30 3/4 in (0.78 m)	9 3/4 in (0.25 m)	6 ft 3 3/4 in (1.92 m)	5.11 s	1.78 s	3.02 s	4.69 s	7.46 s	27.5 in (0.70 m)	8 ft 1 in (2.46 m)	23 reps
All values from Pro Day

=== Houston Texans ===
Ferentz was signed by the Houston Texans on May 16, 2014. He was waived by the Texans on August 30, 2014, and was signed to the practice squad the next day. He signed a reserve/futures contract with the Texans on December 30, 2014.

On September 5, 2015, Ferentz was waived by the Texans.

=== Denver Broncos ===
On September 6, 2015, the Denver Broncos claimed Ferentz off waivers. In the 2015 regular season, he played in 13 games. On February 7, 2016, Ferentz was part of the Broncos team that won Super Bowl 50. In the game, the Broncos defeated the Carolina Panthers by a score of 24–10. In the 2016 season, he appeared in six games for the Broncos.

On May 10, 2017, Ferentz was released by the Broncos.

=== New England Patriots ===
On May 18, 2017, Ferentz signed with the New England Patriots. He was waived on September 2, 2017, and signed to the practice squad the next day. He signed a reserve/future contract with the Patriots on February 6, 2018.

On September 1, 2018, Ferentz was waived by the Patriots and was signed to the practice squad the next day. Ferentz was promoted to the Patriots' active roster on November 3, 2018. Ferentz won his second Super Bowl when the Patriots defeated the Los Angeles Rams 13–3 in Super Bowl LIII.

On August 31, 2019, Ferentz was released during final roster cuts. He was re-signed on September 6, 2019, with the release of Russell Bodine.

On September 16, 2020, Ferentz was signed to the Patriots practice squad. He was promoted to the active roster on September 26, 2020. He was placed on the reserve/COVID-19 list by the team on October 16 and activated on October 28.

On May 17, 2021, Ferentz re-signed with the Patriots. On August 31, Ferentz was waived and signed to the practice squad the following day. He was signed to the active roster on October 27. He was released on November 8, 2021, and re-signed to the practice squad.

On March 14, 2022, Ferentz re-signed with the Patriots. He was released on August 30, 2022, and signed to the practice squad the next day. He was promoted to the active roster on September 6.

On March 9, 2023, Ferentz re-signed with the Patriots. He was released on August 29, 2023, and re-signed to the practice squad. Ferentz was signed to the active roster on December 23.

Ferentz announced his retirement on February 19, 2024.

== NFL coaching career ==
=== New York Giants ===
On March 26, 2024, Ferentz was announced as the new assistant offensive line coach for the New York Giants. He was let go when the 2025 season was over.

=== Houston Texans ===
Ferentz was hired as the tight ends coach for the Houston Texans before the 2026 NFL season.

== Personal life ==
James Ferentz is the son of Mary and Kirk Ferentz, the Iowa Hawkeyes head coach. He is brother to noted football player, Brian Ferentz.
