= Chris Doyle (American football) =

American football player and coach (born 1968)

Personal information
- Born: June 30, 1968 (age 58); Quincy, Massachusetts, U.S.

Career information
- College: Boston University

Career history
- Syracuse (1990) Graduate assistant; Notre Dame (1991) Graduate assistant; Holy Cross (1992–1995) Offensive line coach; Wisconsin (1996–1997) Strength and conditioning coach; Utah (1998) Strength and conditioning coach; Iowa (1999–2020) Strength and conditioning coach; Jacksonville Jaguars (2021) Director of sport performance

Awards and highlights
- Big Ten Strength Coach of the Year (1999)

Chris Doyle (born June 30, 1968) is an American football coach and former player. He was the head strength and conditioning coach at the University of Iowa from 1999 until 2020. Doyle was hired by the Jacksonville Jaguars, but resigned a day later following public backlash about his controversial past at Iowa. Doyle played college football on the offensive line at Boston University from 1986 to 1988.

== Background ==
Raised in Quincy, Massachusetts, Doyle attended Boston College High School, where he played football. Doyle attended college at Boston University, earning a Bachelor of Science in human movement and a Masters of Education.

== Coaching career ==
=== Iowa Hawkeyes ===
Doyle served as strength and conditioning coach for Iowa Hawkeyes football from 1999 to 2020. He trained 180 student-athletes who have joined professional sports teams, as well as 19 former assistants who have become head strength and conditioning coaches.

On June 15, 2020, Iowa announced a separation agreement between the school and Doyle. Before the separation Doyle was the highest paid strength and conditioning coach in college football making $800,000. Under the agreement Doyle was paid 15 months salary which was over $1.1 million.

Doyle was the Iowa football strength coach in 2011 when 13 players developed rhabdomyolysis following gruelling offseason workouts.

==== Accusations of racism and bullying ====
Multiple former Iowa players spoke out about racial disparities in the Iowa program and incidents where Doyle allegedly made racist comments and belittled players. He was subsequently placed on administrative leave.

During the 2020 racial unrest in the United States after the murder of George Floyd by police, Black former Iowa football players called for changes within the program. Former Iowa offensive lineman James Daniels tweeted "If the team collectively decides to kneel, this will bring about a cultural change for both Iowa football and the state of Iowa which I believe is long overdue!!!" Two days later, Daniels followed up with a second tweet asserting “there are too many racial disparities in the Iowa football program. Black players have been treated unfairly for far too long.” Several other Iowa players added to Daniels' claims, citing Doyle and offensive coordinator Brian Ferentz as two of the leading causes of racial disparities in Iowa football. Former Iowa defensive lineman Jaleel Johnson wrote on Twitter "Coach Doyle is the problem in that building. And so is Brian Ferentz.... things won't progress until those two fix themselves. They know they're a problem."

=== Jacksonville Jaguars ===
Doyle was hired to be the director of sport performance for the Jacksonville Jaguars on February 11, 2021. Due to backlash over his Iowa tenure, Doyle resigned his position from the Jaguars the following day.

== Personal life ==
Doyle’s son, Declan, is the offensive coordinator for the Baltimore Ravens.
