= Jaleel Johnson =

American football player (born 1994)

No. 94, 93, 90, 79
- Position: Defensive end

Personal information
- Born: July 12, 1994 (age 32); Brooklyn, New York, U.S.
- Listed height: 6 ft 3 in (1.91 m)
- Listed weight: 316 lb (143 kg)

Career information
- High school: Montini Catholic (Lombard, Illinois)
- College: Iowa (2012–2016)
- NFL draft: 2017: 4th round, 109th overall pick

Career history
- Minnesota Vikings (2017–2020); Houston Texans (2021)*; New Orleans Saints (2021)*; Houston Texans (2021); New Orleans Saints (2022)*; Atlanta Falcons (2022)*; Houston Texans (2022); Atlanta Falcons (2022); Tennessee Titans (2023)
- * Offseason or practice squad member only

Awards and highlights
- First-team All-Big Ten (2016)

Career NFL statistics
- Total tackles: 149
- Sacks: 7.5
- Forced fumbles: 1
- Fumble recoveries: 2
- Stats at Pro Football Reference

Jaleel Johnson (born July 12, 1994) is an American former professional football player who was a defensive end in the National Football League (NFL). He played college football for the Iowa Hawkeyes. Johnson was selected by the Minnesota Vikings in the fourth round of the 2017 NFL draft.

== Early life ==
Born in New York City, Johnson grew up in a rough neighborhood in Brooklyn. As a teenager, his parents sent him to live with an aunt in Chicago where he had a better chance to thrive. He played football and wrestled at St. Joseph High School in Westchester, Illinois, where he was a three-year starter as a defensive tackle and offensive lineman and was named first-team All-area. However, in the middle of his junior year, due to a coaching change and a losing season, Johnson transferred to Montini Catholic High School for his senior season, and in his only campaign at Montini, Johnson was named team captain and earned first-team All-state, All-conference and All-area honors as well as prep All-America recognition after helping the Broncos post 12-2 a record while winning the state championship, finishing with a 70–45 victory over Joliet Catholic. He recorded 80 tackles, including five tackles for loss, three sacks and nine pressures. During his time at St. Joseph, Johnson also earned two letters as a heavyweight wrestler.

Regarded as a four-star recruit by Rivals.com, Johnson received scholarship offers from half of the Big Ten. It was Iowa coach Kirk Ferentz who convinced him to play for the Hawkeyes after he sent a personal letter that made an impression on Johnson. He took a few visits to Iowa City and decided to sign with the Hawkeyes. Shortly after Signing Day, Johnson decommitted to take a closer look at Michigan State one more time, but ended up committing back to Iowa.

== College career ==
Johnson played at the University of Iowa from 2012 to 2016. Johnson had to wait a while before getting significant playing time due to Iowa's depth in the interior defensive line. He redshirted in 2012, and played in seven games as a reserve defensive tackle the following season, and then had 11 tackles, 2.5 for loss, as a backup in 2014. Given the starting role as a junior in 2015, Johnson garnered honorable mention All-Big Ten honors. Johnson stepped up his game in 2016, being named first-team All-Conference after leading his team with 10 tackles for loss and 7.5 sacks. In Iowa's biggest game in 2016 against No. 3 Michigan, Johnson was one of the biggest reasons the Hawkeyes won 14–13, as he led the team with 9 tackles, 2 tackles for loss, 1 sack and a safety in the second quarter. According to Pro Football Focus (PFF), Johnson ranked sixth among defensive tackles in pass rush productivity with 43 combined pressures in 330 snaps. During his five-year career with the Hawkeyes, Johnson posted 113 tackles, 18.5 of them for loss and 12.5 sacks.

=== Statistics ===
Year	Team	Tackles					Interceptions						Fumbles			
Year	Team	Total	Solo	Ast	Sck	Tfl	PDef	Int	Yards	Avg	Lng	TDs	FF	FR	FR Yds	TDs
2013	Iowa	1	0	1	0.0	0.0	0	0	0	0.0	0	0	0	0	0	0
2014	Iowa	11	2	9	1.5	3.0	0	0	0	0.0	0	0	0	0	0	0
2015	Iowa	45	22	23	3.5	5.5	1	0	0	0.0	0	0	0	1	0	0
2016	Iowa	56	30	26	7.5	10.0	2	0	0	0.0	0	0	0	0	0	0
NCAA career totals		113	54	59	12.5	18.5	3	0	0	0.0	0	0	0	1	0	0

== Professional career ==
External videos
- Johnson performing at the NFL Combine

Pre-draft measurables
Height	Weight	Arm length	Hand span	40-yard dash	10-yard split	20-yard split	20-yard shuttle	Three-cone drill	Vertical jump	Broad jump	Bench press
6 ft 2 5/8 in (1.90 m)	316 lb (143 kg)	33 1/4 in (0.84 m)	9 5/8 in (0.24 m)	5.25 s	1.84 s	3.07 s	4.62 s	7.64 s	28 in (0.71 m)	8 ft 5 in (2.57 m)	19 reps
All values are from NFL Combine except 40-yard dash and broad jump from Iowa Pro Day

=== Minnesota Vikings ===
Johnson was drafted by the Minnesota Vikings in the fourth round with the 109th overall selection in the 2017 NFL draft.

Over his first three seasons in the NFL, Johnson played mainly in a reserve role, making four starts while also recording four sacks over that period, including 3.5 sacks in 2019. In 2020, Johnson moved into a starting role after projected starter Michael Pierce opted out of the season due to concerns over COVID-19. He started all 16 games and recorded 44 tackles and one and a half sacks.

=== Houston Texans ===
On April 8, 2021, Johnson signed with the Houston Texans. He was released by the Texans as a part of final roster cuts on August 31.

=== New Orleans Saints ===
On September 6, 2021, Johnson was signed to the New Orleans Saints' practice squad.

=== Houston Texans (second stint) ===
On September 15, 2021, Johnson was signed by the Texans off the Saints practice squad after defensive lineman Vincent Taylor suffered an ankle injury.

=== New Orleans Saints (second stint) ===
On April 4, 2022, Johnson signed with the New Orleans Saints. He was released by New Orleans on August 11, but was re-signed four days later. Johnson was placed on injured reserve on August 17. On August 23, he was released by the Saints with an injury settlement.

=== Atlanta Falcons ===
On October 5, 2022, Johnson was signed to the Atlanta Falcons' practice squad.

=== Houston Texans (third stint) ===
On October 27, 2022, Johnson was signed by the Houston Texans off of the Falcons' practice squad. He was released by the Texans on November 19.

=== Atlanta Falcons (second stint) ===
On November 21, 2022, Johnson was claimed off waivers by the Atlanta Falcons.

=== Tennessee Titans ===
On May 30, 2023, Johnson signed with the Tennessee Titans. He was released by Tennessee on August 29, and was re-signed to the team's practice squad on September 20. Johnson was promoted to the active roster on October 28. Johnson was released on November 21 and re-signed eight days later.

Johnson announced his retirement on Instagram on March 19, 2025, after spending the entire 2024 season as an unsigned free agent.
