= 2013 Gator Bowl =

2013 TaxSlayer.com Gator Bowl
- 68th Gator Bowl
Mississippi State Bulldogs	Northwestern Wildcats
(8–4)	(9–3)
SEC	Big Ten
20	34
Head coach: Dan Mullen	Head coach: Pat Fitzgerald
	AP / Coaches / BCS; 21 / 17 / 20
	1	2	3	4	Total
Mississippi State	0	10	3	7	20
Northwestern	10	3	14	7	34
- Date: January 1, 2013
- Season: 2012
- Stadium: EverBank Field
- Location: Jacksonville, Florida
- MVP: Jared Carpenter (S, Northwestern) & Nickoe Whitley (DB, Mississippi State)
- Favorite: Northwestern by 2
- Referee: Greg Burks (Big 12)
- Attendance: 48,612

United States TV coverage
- Network: ESPN2
- Announcers: Bob Wischusen (Play-by-Play); Danny Kanell (Analyst); Allison Williams
- Nielsen ratings: 1.6

The 2013 TaxSlayer.com Gator Bowl was a post-season American college football bowl game held on January 1, 2013, at EverBank Field in Jacksonville, Florida in the United States. The 68th edition of the Gator Bowl began at noon EST and aired on ESPN2. It featured the Mississippi State Bulldogs from the Southeastern Conference (SEC) against the Northwestern Wildcats from the Big Ten Conference and was the final game of the 2012 NCAA Division I FBS football season for both teams. The Bulldogs accepted their bowl bid after an 8–4 regular season, while the Wildcats accepted theirs after a 9–3 finish. It was the first time that the two teams had met. Northwestern won the game by a score of 34 – 20.

== Teams ==
=== Mississippi State ===
With a 3–0 start in conference play (and a 7–0 start overall), the season had a bright outlook for the Bulldogs. However, the schedule's increasing difficulty put the Bulldogs in decline, only finishing at 4–4 and fourth place in the SEC Western Division.

This was the Bulldogs' second Gator Bowl; they had previously played in the 2011 game, soundly defeating the Michigan Wolverines by a score of 52–14.

=== Northwestern ===
The Wildcats were undefeated out of conference and posted a 5–3 Big Ten record, good for third place in the Legends Division. Only a one-point loss to the Nebraska Cornhuskers and an overtime loss to the Michigan Wolverines kept the Wildcats from the division title and a trip to the conference championship game.

This game was the Wildcats' first Gator Bowl; it was also their unprecedented fifth consecutive bowl game. The Wildcats got their first bowl victory since the 1948 team won the 1949 Rose Bowl over the California Golden Bears by a score of 20–14.

== Game summary ==
=== Scoring summary ===
Scoring summary

Quarter	Time	Drive			Team	Scoring information	Score	
Quarter	Time	Plays	Yards	TOP	Team	Scoring information	Mississippi State	Northwestern
4	14:13	-	-	-	NORTH	Interception returned 29 yards for touchdown by Quentin Williams, Jeff Budzien kick good	0	7
1	4:49	15	69	6:00	NORTH	34-yard field goal by Jeff Budzien	0	10
2	14:48	10	43	3:26	NORTH	37-yard field goal by Jeff Budzien	0	13
2	4:48	6	53	3:18	MSU	27-yard field goal by Devon Bell	3	13
2	1:06	6	62	1:25	MSU	Arceto Clark 18-yard touchdown reception from Tyler Russell, Devon Bell kick good	10	13
3	10:37	8	24	3:02	MSU	47-yard field goal by Devon Bell	13	13
3	9:25	6	76	1:12	NORTH	Tyris Jones 3-yard touchdown run, Jeff Budzien kick good	13	20
3	0:26	8	74	3:59	NORTH	Trevor Siemian 4-yard touchdown run, Jeff Budzien kick good	13	27
4	11:42	8	75	3:44	MSU	Malcolm Johnson 14-yard touchdown reception from Tyler Russell, Devon Bell kick good	20	27
4	8:10	3	5	1:44	NORTH	Venric Mark 3-yard touchdown run, Jeff Budzien kick good	20	34
"TOP" = time of possession. For other American football terms, see Glossary of American football.							20	34

=== Game notes ===
Mississippi State opened as a 2-point favorite, but by kickoff Northwestern was the favorite -2.5
