= 2012 Northwestern Wildcats football team =

American college football season

2012 Northwestern Wildcats football

Gator Bowl champion

Gator Bowl, W 34–20 vs. Mississippi State
- Conference: Big Ten Conference
- Legends Division

Ranking
- Coaches: No. 16
- AP: No. 17
- Record: 10–3 (5–3 Big Ten)
- Head coach: Pat Fitzgerald (7th season)
- Offensive coordinator: Mick McCall (5th season)
- Offensive scheme: Spread
- Defensive coordinator: Mike Hankwitz (5th season)
- Base defense: Multiple 4–3
- Captains: Brian Arnfelt; Kain Colter; Brian Mulroe; David Nwabuisi
- Home stadium: Ryan Field

2012 Big Ten Conference football standings
	Conf.			Overall
Team	W		L	W		L
Legends Division
No. 25 Nebraska xy	7	–	1	10	–	4
No. 24 Michigan	6	–	2	8	–	5
No. 17 Northwestern	5	–	3	10	–	3
Michigan State	3	–	5	7	–	6
Iowa	2	–	6	4	–	8
Minnesota	2	–	6	6	–	7
Leaders Division
No. 3 Ohio State* x	8	–	0	12	–	0
Penn State*	6	–	2	8	–	4
Wisconsin y$	4	–	4	8	–	6
Purdue	3	–	5	6	–	7
Indiana	2	–	6	4	–	8
Illinois	0	–	8	2	–	10
Championship: Wisconsin 70, Nebraska 31
$ – BCS representative as conference champion; x – Division champion/co-champions; * Ohio State and Penn State ineligible for conference championship game and post-season bowl games due to NCAA sanctions.; Rankings from AP Poll

The 2012 Northwestern Wildcats football team represented Northwestern University during the 2012 NCAA Division I FBS football season. Pat Fitzgerald, in his seventh season at Northwestern, was the team's head coach. The Wildcats home games were played at Ryan Field in Evanston, Illinois. They were members of the Legends Division of the Big Ten Conference. The Wildcats won their first bowl game since the 1949 Rose Bowl against California by defeating Mississippi State in the Gator Bowl 34–20. They finished the season 10–3 (5–3 Big Ten).

== Preseason ==
=== Recruiting ===
Northwestern signed 21 recruits to letters-of-intent on National Signing Day on February 1, 2012.

=== Transfers ===
Wide receiver Kyle Prater transferred to Northwestern from USC on January 28, 2012, after being injured during most of the 2011 season and redshirting in 2010. The Wildcats requested a waiver to allow Prater to play immediately in 2012, as he transferred to a school close to home in order to care for a family member. Sophomore running back Adonis Smith, who was thought to be a candidate for the starting running back job in 2012 after rushing for 266 yards in 2011, announced his intent to transfer from Northwestern on February 22. He decided to transfer to UNLV. Defensive back Quinn Evans transferred to Northwestern after graduating from Stanford in June 2012. After missing the entire 2011 season because of injury, he chose to attend Northwestern as a graduate student with a year of college football eligibility remaining.

== Schedule ==
The schedule is as follows:

Date	Time	Opponent	Rank	Site	TV	Result	Attendance
September 1	11:00 am	at Syracuse*		Carrier Dome; Syracuse, NY	ESPN2	W 42–41	37,830
September 8	7:00 pm	Vanderbilt*		Ryan Field; Evanston, IL	BTN	W 23–13	31,644
September 15	2:30 pm	Boston College*		Ryan Field; Evanston, IL	BTN	W 22–13	32,597
September 22	2:30 pm	South Dakota*		Ryan Field; Evanston, IL	BTN	W 38–7	28,641
September 29	11:00 am	Indiana		Ryan Field; Evanston, IL	BTN	W 44–29	33,129
October 6	11:00 am	at Penn State	No. 24	Beaver Stadium; University Park, PA	ESPN	L 28–39	95,796
October 13	11:00 am	at Minnesota		TCF Bank Stadium; Minneapolis, MN	ESPN2	W 21–13	49,651
October 20	2:30 pm	Nebraska		Ryan Field; Evanston, IL	ABC/ESPN2	L 28–29	47,330
October 27	11:00 am	Iowa^{†}		Ryan Field; Evanston, IL	ESPN2	W 28–17	44,121
November 10	11:00 am	at Michigan	No. 24	Michigan Stadium; Ann Arbor, MI (rivalry)	ESPN	L 31–38 ^{OT}	112,510
November 17	11:00 am	at Michigan State		Spartan Stadium; East Lansing, MI	ESPN2	W 23–20	75,101
November 24	11:00 am	Illinois		Ryan Field; Evanston, IL (Land of Lincoln Trophy)	BTN	W 50–14	32,415
January 1	11:00 am	vs. Mississippi State	No. 21	EverBank Field; Jacksonville, FL (Gator Bowl)	ESPN2	W 34–20	48,612
*Non-conference game; ^{†}Homecoming; Rankings from AP Poll released prior to the game; All times are in Central time

== Rankings ==
Ranking movements Legend: ██ Increase in ranking ██ Decrease in ranking — = Not ranked RV = Received votes
	Week															
Poll	Pre	1	2	3	4	5	6	7	8	9	10	11	12	13	14	Final
AP	—	RV	RV	RV	RV	24	RV	RV	—	RV	RV	RV	RV	22	21	17
Coaches	—	RV	RV	RV	RV	22	RV	RV	RV	RV	21	RV	RV	20	17	16
Harris	Not released						RV	RV	RV	RV	24	RV	RV	21	20	Not released
BCS	Not released							—	—	—	24	—	—	22	20	Not released

== Game summaries ==
=== Syracuse ===
Team	1	2	3	4	Total
• Northwestern	7	14	14	7	42
Syracuse	6	7	14	14	41

- Date: September 1
- Location: Carrier Dome, Syracuse, NY
- Game start: 11:00 a.m. CDT
- Elapsed time: 4:00
- Game attendance: 37,830
- Game weather: 80 °F (27 °C) at kickoff, reaching 95 °F (35 °C) inside the dome by the 2nd half
- Referee: John O'Neill
- TV announcers (ESPN2): Beth Mowins (Play-by-play), Joey Galloway (Color) & Jenn Brown (Sideline)

Scoring summary
1	10:47	SYR	Ross Krautman 22 yd field goal	SYR 0–3
1	3:57	SYR	Ross Krautman 33 yd field goal	SYR 0–6
1	0:23	NU	Venric Mark 82 yd punt return (Jeff Budzien kick)	NU 7–6
2	10:58	SYR	Prince-Tyson Gulley 14 yd run (Ross Krautman kick)	SYR 7–13
2	6:53	NU	Venric Mark 21 yd pass from Kain Colter (Jeff Budzien kick)	NU 14–13
2	3:49	NU	Christian Jones 14 yd pass from Kain Colter (Jeff Budzien kick)	NU 21–13
3	13:32	NU	Chi Chi Ariguzo 33 yd fumble return (Jeff Budzien kick)	NU 28–13
3	7:34	NU	Kain Colter 1 yd run (Jeff Budzien kick)	NU 35–13
3	2:21	SYR	Marcus Sales 7 yd pass from Ryan Nassib (Ross Krautman kick)	NU 35–20
3	0:00	SYR	Jeremiah Kobena 50 yd pass from Ryan Nassib (Ross Krautman kick)	NU 35–27
4	6:42	SYR	Jeremiah Kobena 7 yd pass from Ryan Nassib (two-point conversion failed)	NU 35–33
4	2:40	SYR	Christopher Clark 20 yd pass from Ryan Nassib (Prince-Tyson Gulley run for two-point conversion)	SYR 35–41
4	0:44	NU	Demetrius Fields 9 yd pass from Trevor Siemian (Jeff Budzien kick)	Nu 42–41

The game got off to a slow start with some notable miscues on Northwestern's special teams play. All of which was quickly forgotten when Venric Mark scored an 82-yard touchdown on a punt return, the first return touchdown of his career. Northwestern continued to dominate offensively on the work of Mark and Kain Colter, taking a 35–13 lead in the middle of the 3rd quarter. The Orange then scored 4 straight touchdowns to lead 41–35 by attacking the young Northwestern secondary with deep passes to the outside. With under 3 minutes left and needing a score to win, Northwestern changed quarterbacks. Trevor Siemian came on to lead a 75-yard drive that scored the go-ahead touchdown. Northwestern survived to win and remain 7–0 in season openers under Pat Fitzgerald.

=== Vanderbilt ===
Team	1	2	3	4	Total
Vanderbilt	7	3	0	3	13
• Northwestern	3	0	3	17	23

- Date: September 8
- Location: Ryan Field, Evanston, IL
- Game start: 7:03 p.m. CDT
- Elapsed time: 3:15
- Game attendance: 31,644
- Game weather: 71 °F (22 °C), mostly cloudy, wind 9 mph (14 km/h) NW
- Referee: Matt Laeffler
- TV announcers (BTN): Eric Collins (Play-by-play), Derek Rackley (Color) & Lisa Byington (Sideline)

Scoring summary
1	10:11	Vandy	Jordan Matthews 22 yd pass from Jordan Rodgers (Carey Spear kick)	Vandy 7–0
1	7:14	NU	Jeff Budzien 40 yd field goal	Vandy 7–3
2	12:38	Vandy	Carey Spear 32 yd field goal	Vandy 10–3
3	10:16	NU	Jeff Budzien 37 yd field goal	Vandy 10–6
4	9:28	NU	Venric Mark 7 yd run (Jeff Budzien kick)	NU 10–13
4	5:21	Vandy	Carey Spear 26 yd field goal	Tied 13–13
4	2:01	NU	Jeff Budzien 18 yd field goal	NU 13–16
4	1:24	NU	Kain Colter 29 yd run (Jeff Budzien kick)	NU 13–23

=== Boston College ===
Team	1	2	3	4	Total
Boston College	3	7	0	3	13
• Northwestern	6	6	3	7	22

- Date: September 15
- Location: Ryan Field, Evanston, IL
- Game start: 2:43 p.m. CDT
- Elapsed time: 3:19
- Game attendance: 32,597
- Game weather: 75 °F (24 °C), sunny, wind 8 mph (13 km/h) NE
- Referee: Gary Patterson
- TV announcers (BTN): Josh Lewin (Play-by-play), Jon Jansen (Color) & Evan Fitzgerald (Sideline)

Scoring summary
1	12:25	NU	Jeff Budzien 42 yd field goal	NU 0–3
1	8:03	BC	Nate Freese 21 yd field goal	Tied 3–3
1	3:36	NU	Jeff Budzien 20 yd field goal	NU 3–6
2	13:21	NU	Jeff Budzien 29 yd field goal	NU 3–9
2	1:38	BC	Johnathan Coleman 31 yd pass from Chase Rettig (Nate Freese kick)	BC 10–9
2	0:02	NU	Jeff Budzien 41 yd field goal	NU 10–12
3	2:50	NU	Jeff Budzien 19 yd field goal	NU 10–15
4	14:50	BC	Nate Freese 34 yd field goal	NU 13–15
4	1:37	NU	Mike Trumpy 27 yd run (Jeff Budzien kick)	NU 13–22

=== South Dakota ===
Team	1	2	3	4	Total
South Dakota	0	0	7	0	7
• Northwestern	14	14	7	3	38

- Date: September 22
- Location: Ryan Field, Evanston, IL
- Game start: 2:42 p.m. CDT
- Elapsed time: 2:58
- Game attendance: 28,641
- Game weather: 55 °F (13 °C), mostly sunny, wind 15 mph (24 km/h) WNW
- Referee: Todd Geerlings
- TV announcers (BTN): Wayne Larrivee (Play-by-play), Jon Jansen (Color) & Evan Fitzgerald (Sideline)

Scoring summary
1	11:29	NU	Venric Mark 3 yd run (Jeff Budzien kick)	NU 0–7
1	7:28	NU	Tyris Jones 5 yd run (Jeff Budzien kick)	NU 0–14
2	8:16	NU	Venric Mark 6 yd run (Jeff Budzien kick)	NU 0–21
2	0:52	NU	Venric Mark 4 yd run (Jeff Budzien kick)	NU 0–28
3	11:33	NU	Treyvon Green 33 yd run (Jeff Budzien kick)	NU 0–35
3	4:10	SD	Josh Vander Maten 4 yd run (Kevin Robb kick)	NU 7–35
4	10:00	NU	Steve Flaherty 39 yd field goal	NU 7–38

=== Indiana ===
Team	1	2	3	4	Total
Indiana	0	0	21	8	29
• Northwestern	7	13	17	7	44

- Date: September 29
- Location: Ryan Field, Evanston, IL
- Game start: 11:01 a.m. CDT
- Elapsed time: 3:18
- Game attendance: 33,129
- Game weather: 66 °F (19 °C), partly cloudy, wind 6 mph (9.7 km/h) WNW
- Referee: Mike Cannon
- TV announcers (BTN): Kevin Kugler (Play-by-play) & Chris Martin (Color)

Scoring summary
1	5:52	NU	Kain Colter 8 yd run (Jeff Budzien kick)	NU 0–7
2	11:41	NU	Jeff Budzien 44 yd field goal)	NU 0–10
2	7:59	NU	Kain Colter 8 yd run (Jeff Budzien kick)	NU 0–17
2	0:56	NU	Jeff Budzien 34 yd field goal)	NU 0–20
3	11:52	NU	Kain Colter 15 yd run (Jeff Budzien kick)	NU 0–27
3	9:24	IU	Stephen Houston 20 yd run (Mitch Ewald kick)	NU 7–27
3	7:28	IU	Kofi Hughes 35 yd pass from Nate Sudfeld (Mitch Ewald kick)	NU 14–27
3	4:43	NU	Venric Mark 1 yd run (Jeff Budzien kick)	NU 14–34
3	4:29	IU	Tevin Coleman 96 yd kickoff return (Mitch Ewald kick)	NU 21–34
3	1:16	NU	Jeff Budzien 29 yd field goal	NU 21–37
4	14:06	IU	D'Angelo Roberts 2 yd run (Kofi Hughes run for two-point conversion)	NU 29–37
4	5:07	NU	Kain Colter 22 yd run (Jeff Budzien kick)	NU 29–44

=== Penn State ===
Team	1	2	3	4	Total
#24 Northwestern	0	14	14	0	28
• Penn State	3	7	7	22	39

- Date: October 6
- Location: Beaver Stadium, University Park, PA
- Game start: 11:00 a.m. CDT
- Elapsed time: 3:20
- Game attendance: 95,769
- Game weather: 54–56 °F (12–13 °C), cloudy and cool, wind W 12 mph (19 km/h)
- Referee: John O'Neill
- TV announcers (ESPN): Dave Pasch (Play-by-play), Brian Griese (Color) & Jenn Brown (Sideline)

== Roster ==
2012 Northwestern Wildcats roster
Quarterbacks: 2 Kain Colter (C) – Junior; 10 Zack Oliver – (redshirt) Freshman; 13 Trevor Siemian – Sophomore; 15 P. J. Carollo – (redshirt) Freshman; 18 Christian Salem – Freshman; Running backs: 3 Tyris Jones – Senior; 5 Venric Mark – Junior; 20 Malin Jones – Freshman; 21 Jordan Perkins – Freshman; 22 Treyvon Green – Sophomore; 25 Jordan Perkins – (redshirt) Freshman; 27 Mike Panico – Freshman; 28 Tim Hanrahan – Sophomore; 29 Stephen Buckley – Freshman; 32 Mike Trumpy – Junior; 34 Michael Odom – Freshman; Wide receivers: 6 Tony Jones – Sophomore; 8 Demetrius Fields – Senior; 8 Jack Mitchell – Freshman; 11 Pierre Youngblood-Ary – (redshirt) Freshman; 12 Cermak Bland – (redshirt) Freshman; 14 Christian Jones – Sophomore; 17 Rashad Lawrence – Junior; 19 Cameron Dickerson – (redshirt) Freshman; 21 Kyle Prater – Sophomore; 80 Mike Jensen – Junior; 82 Andrew Scanlan – Freshman; 83 Mike McHugh – Freshman; 84 Drew Moulton – Junior; 89 Austin Carr – Freshman; Superbacks: 40 Dan Vitale – Freshman; 41 Doug Diedrick – (redshirt) Freshman; 43 Tim Riley – Junior; 81 Evan Watkins – Junior; 85 Mark Szott – (redshirt) Freshman; 86 Jack Schwaba – Freshman; 87 Brian Smith – Junior	Offensive line: 53 Geoff Mogus – (redshirt) Freshman; 57 Matt Frazier – (redshirt) Freshman; 61 Alex Pietrzak – (redshirt) Freshman; 62 Taylor Paxton – Junior; 63 Ian Park – Freshman; 65 Hayden Baker – Sophomore; 66 Brandon Vitabile – Sophomore; 70 Patrick Ward – Senior; 71 Shane Mertz – (redshirt) Freshman; 72 Brian Mulroe (C) – Senior; 73 Adam DePietro – Freshman; 74 Chuck Porcelli – Senior; 75 Jack Konopka – Sophomore; 76 Eric Olson – Freshman; 77 Kenton Playko – Freshman; 79 Neal Deiters – Senior; 81 Paul Jorgensen – Sophomore; Defensive line: 1 Bo Cisek – Senior; 67 Sean McEvilly – Sophomore; 68 Connor Mahoney – Freshman; 88 Quentin Williams – Senior; 89 Max Chapman – (redshirt) Freshman; 90 C. J. Robbins – (redshirt) Freshman; 91 Brian Arnfelt (C) – Senior; 92 Will Hampton – Junior; 93 Greg Kuhar – Freshman; 94 Dean Lowry – Freshman; 95 Davon Custis – Junior; 96 Anthony Battle – Junior; 97 Tyler Scott – Junior; 98 Deonte Gibson – (redshirt) Freshman; 99 Chance Carter – Sophomore	Linebackers: 18 Ifeadi Odenigbo – Freshman; 33 David Nwabuisi (C) – Senior; 35 Eric Wilson – Freshman; 44 Chi Chi Ariguzo – Sophomore; 45 Collin Ellis – Sophomore; 46 Damien Proby – Junior; 48 Roderick Goodlow – Senior; 50 Timmy Vernon – Junior; 51 Jaylen Prater – Freshman; 54 Eric Hauser – Freshman; 55 Drew Smith – (redshirt) Freshman; 56 Will Studlien – Junior; Defensive backs: 3 Sean Oliver – Freshman; 4 Jarrell Williams – (redshirt) Freshman; 9 Jimmy Hall – Sophomore; 15 Daniel Jones – Sophomore; 16 Davion Fleming – Junior; 23 Nick VanHoose – (redshirt) Freshman; 24 Ibraheim Campbell – Sophomore; 36 Mike Eshun – Sophomore; 39 Joe Cannon – Sophomore; 47 Troy Sheppard – Freshman; Cornerbacks: 2 Dwight White – Freshman; 13 C.J. Bryant – Sophomore; 22 Demetrius Dugar – Senior; 31 Quinn Evans – Senior; Safeties: 7 Hunter Bates – Senior; 10 Traveon Henry – Freshman; 26 Terrance Brown – Freshman; 27 Jared Carpenter – Senior; 42 Joseph Jones – Freshman	Punters: 31 Chris Gradone – (redshirt) Freshman; 39 Zak Kucera – Freshman; 49 Brandon Williams – Junior; Punters/kickers: 33 Matt Micucci – Freshman; Kickers: 34 Steve Flaherty – Senior; 37 Jeff Budzien – Junior; 38 Arthur Omilian – (redshirt) Freshman; Long snappers: 52 Chris Fitzpatrick – Freshman; 59 Pat Hickey – Junior; Head coach: Pat Fitzgerald; Coordinators/Assistant coaches: Randy Bates – Linebackers coach; Jerry brown – Assistant head coach/defensive backs coach; Adam Cushing – Offensive line coach; Mike Hankwitz – Defensive coordinator; Bob heffner – Superbacks coach; Marty long – Defensive line coach; Matt macpherson – Running backs coach/recruiting coordinator; Mick mccall – Offensive coordinator/QBs coach; Dennis springer – Wide receivers coach; Legend: (C) Team captain; Redshirt
