= 2012 Big Ten Conference football season =

- League: NCAA Division I Football Bowl Subdivision
- Sport: Football
- Duration: August 31, 2012 through January 2013
- Teams: 12
- TV partner(s): ABC, ESPN2, ESPN Inc., Big Ten Network, FOX (championship game)

2013 NFL Draft
- Top draft pick: Travis Frederick (Wisconsin)
- Picked by: Dallas Cowboys, 31st overall

Regular Season
- Season MVP: Braxton Miller
- Top scorer: Montee Ball (132 points)
- Leaders Division champions: Ohio State
- Legends Division champions: Nebraska

Championship Game
- Champions: Wisconsin Badgers
- Runners-up: Nebraska
- Finals MVP: Montee Ball

Football seasons
- 2011 2013

2012 Big Ten Conference football standings
	Conf.			Overall
Team	W		L	W		L
Legends Division
No. 25 Nebraska xy	7	–	1	10	–	4
No. 24 Michigan	6	–	2	8	–	5
No. 17 Northwestern	5	–	3	10	–	3
Michigan State	3	–	5	7	–	6
Iowa	2	–	6	4	–	8
Minnesota	2	–	6	6	–	7
Leaders Division
No. 3 Ohio State* x	8	–	0	12	–	0
Penn State*	6	–	2	8	–	4
Wisconsin y$	4	–	4	8	–	6
Purdue	3	–	5	6	–	7
Indiana	2	–	6	4	–	8
Illinois	0	–	8	2	–	10
Championship: Wisconsin 70, Nebraska 31
$ – BCS representative as conference champion; x – Division champion/co-champions; * Ohio State and Penn State ineligible for conference championship game and post-season bowl games due to NCAA sanctions.; Rankings from AP Poll

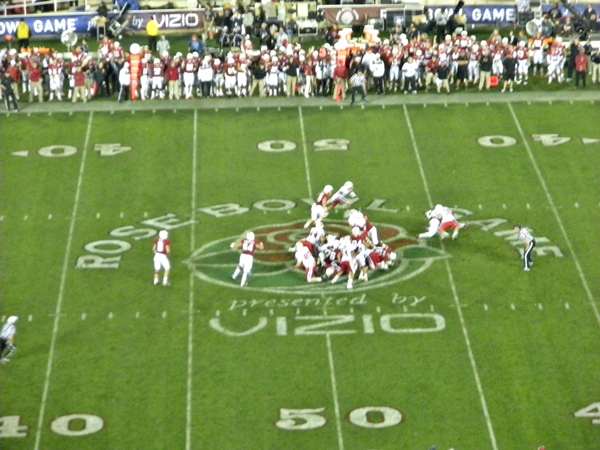
Stanford defeated Wisconsin 20–14 in the 2013 Rose Bowl on January 1, 2013, in Pasadena, California

The 2012 Big Ten Conference football season was the 117th season for the Big Ten. The conference began its season on September 1, as each of the conference's teams began their respective 2012 season of NCAA Division I Football Bowl Subdivision competition. This was the league's second season with a divisional format and a championship game.

== Rankings ==
		Pre	Wk 2	Wk 3	Wk 4	Wk 5	Wk 6	Wk 7	Wk 8	Wk 9	Wk 10	Wk 11	Wk 12	Wk 13	Wk 14	Wk 15	Final
Illinois	AP																
Illinois	C																
Illinois	Harris	Not released															
Illinois	BCS	Not released															
Indiana	AP																
Indiana	C																
Indiana	Harris	Not released															
Indiana	BCS	Not released															
Iowa	AP																
Iowa	C																
Iowa	Harris	Not released															
Iowa	BCS	Not released															
Michigan	AP	8	19	17	18	RV	RV	25	23	20	RV	RV	23	20	21	19	24
Michigan	C	8	19	18	17	RV	RV	RV	25	20	RV	RV	23	20	24	22	RV
Michigan	Harris	Not released						RV	RV	20	RV	RV	24	20	23	22	
Michigan	BCS	Not released								22			21	19	19	18	
Michigan State	AP	13	11	10	21	20	RV	RV									
Michigan State	C	13	11	10	20	18	RV	RV			RV						
Michigan State	Harris	Not released						RV	RV								
Michigan State	BCS	Not released															
Minnesota	AP																
Minnesota	C					RV											
Minnesota	Harris	Not released															
Minnesota	BCS	Not released															
Nebraska	AP	17	16	RV	25	22	21	RV	RV	RV	21	18	16	17	14	23	25
Nebraska	C	16	14	24	22	20	20	RV	RV	RV	21	16	14	14	13	21	23
Nebraska	Harris	Not released						RV	RV	RV	21	16	14	14	13	18	
Nebraska	BCS	Not released									20	16	14	14	12	16	
Northwestern	AP			RV	RV	RV	24	RV	RV		RV	RV	RV	RV	22	21	17
Northwestern	C		RV	RV	RV	RV	22	RV	RV	RV	RV	21	RV	RV	20	17	16
Northwestern	Harris	Not released						RV	RV	RV	RV	24	RV	RV		20	
Northwestern	BCS	Not released										24			22	20	
Ohio State	AP	18	14	12	16	14	12	8	7	9	6	5	6	4	4	3	3
Ohio State	C	Ineligible for ranking															
Ohio State	Harris	Not released						Ineligible for ranking									
Ohio State	BCS	Not released							Ineligible for ranking								
Penn State	AP							RV	RV	RV		RV			RV	RV	RV
Penn State	C	Ineligible for ranking															
Penn State	Harris	Not released						Ineligible for ranking									
Penn State	BCS	Not released							Ineligible for ranking								
Purdue	AP				RV	RV											
Purdue	C					RV	RV										
Purdue	Harris	Not released															
Purdue	BCS	Not released															
Wisconsin	AP	12	13	RV	RV	RV			RV	RV	RV	RV	RV	RV		RV	RV
Wisconsin	C	12	13	22	24	23	RV	RV	RV	25	RV	RV	RV	RV		23	RV
Wisconsin	Harris	Not released						RV	RV	RV	RV	RV	RV	RV		25	
Wisconsin	BCS	Not released								25							

Legend
	Improvement in ranking
	Drop in ranking
	Not ranked previous week
	No change in ranking from previous week
RV	Received votes but were not ranked in Top 25 of poll

== Spring games ==
April 14

- Illinois
- Indiana
- Iowa
- Michigan
- Nebraska (canceled)
- Northwestern
- Purdue

April 21

- Minnesota
- Ohio State
- Penn State

April 28

- Michigan State
- Wisconsin

== Schedule ==
Index to colors and formatting
Big Ten member won
Big Ten member lost
Big Ten teams in **bold**

All times Eastern time.

Rankings = AP / Coaches.

=== Week 1 ===
Date	Time	Visiting team	Home team	Site	TV	Result	Attendance	Ref.
August 30	11:00 pm	**Minnesota**	UNLV	Sam Boyd Stadium • Las Vegas	CBS Sports Network	**W** 30–27 ^{3OT}	16,013	
August 31	8:00 pm	No. 24 Boise State	No. 13 **Michigan State**	Spartan Stadium • East Lansing, Michigan	ESPN	**W** 17–13	78,709	
September 1	12:00 pm	Western Michigan	**Illinois**	Memorial Stadium • Syracuse, New York	ESPN2	**W** 24–7	43,441	
September 1	12:00 pm	**Northwestern**	Syracuse	Carrier Dome • Champaign, Illinois	ESPNU	**W** 42–41	37,830	
September 1	12:00 pm	Ohio	**Penn State**	Beaver Stadium • State College, Pennsylvania	ESPN	**L** 14–24	97,186	
September 1	12:00 pm	Miami (OH)	No. 18 **Ohio State**	Ohio Stadium • Columbus, Ohio	BTN	**W** 56–10	105,039	
September 1	3:30 pm	**Iowa**	Northern Illinois	Soldier Field • Chicago	ESPNU	**W** 18–17	52,117	
September 1	3:30 pm	Southern Mississippi	No. 17 **Nebraska**	Memorial Stadium • Lincoln, Nebraska	ABC / ESPN2	**W** 49–20	85,425	
September 1	3:30 pm	Eastern Kentucky	**Purdue**	Ross–Ade Stadium • West Lafayette, Indiana	BTN	**W** 48–6	40,572	
September 1	3:30 pm	Northern Iowa	No. 12 **Wisconsin**	Camp Randall Stadium • Madison, Wisconsin	BTN	**W** 26–21	79,568	
September 1	8:00 pm	No. 8 **Michigan**	No. 2 Alabama	Cowboys Stadium • Arlington, Texas	ABC	**L** 14–41	90,413	
September 1	8:00 pm	Indiana State	**Indiana**	Memorial Stadium • Bloomington, Indiana	BTN	**W** 24–17	41,882	
^{#}Rankings from AP Poll released prior to game. All times are in Eastern Time.

=== Week 2 ===
Date	Time	Visiting team	Home team	Site	Broadcast	Result	Attendance
September 8	12:00 pm	New Hampshire	**Minnesota**	TCF Bank Stadium • Minneapolis	BTN	**W** 44-7	47,022
September 8	12:00 pm	**Penn State**	Virginia	Scott Stadium • Charlottesville, Virginia	ABC	**L** 16-17	56,087
September 8	12:00 pm	Central Florida	#14 / NR **Ohio State**	Ohio Stadium • Columbus, Ohio	ESPN2	**W** 31-16	104,745
September 8	3:30 pm	Air Force	#19 / #19 **Michigan**	Michigan Stadium • Ann Arbor, Michigan	ABC / ESPN2	**W** 31-25	112,522
September 8	3:30 pm	**Indiana**	Massachusetts	Gillette Stadium • Foxborough, Massachusetts	ESPN3	**W** 45-6	16,304
September 8	3:30 pm	Iowa State	**Iowa**	Kinnick Stadium • Iowa City, Iowa	BTN	**L** 6-9	70,585
September 8	3:30 pm	#11 / #11 **Michigan State**	Central Michigan	Kelly/Shorts Stadium • Mount Pleasant, Michigan	ESPNU	**W** 41-7	35,127
September 8	3:30 pm	**Purdue**	#22 / #22 Notre Dame	Notre Dame Stadium • South Bend, Indiana	NBC	**L** 17-20	80,795
September 8	4:00 pm	#13 / #13 **Wisconsin**	Oregon State	Reser Stadium • Corvallis, Oregon	FX	**L** 7-10	42,189
September 8	7:30 pm	#16 / #14 **Nebraska**	#22 / #23 UCLA	Rose Bowl • Pasadena, California	FOX	**L** 30-36	71,530
September 8	8:00 pm	Vanderbilt	**Northwestern**	Ryan Field • Evanston, Illinois	BTN	**W** 23-13	31,644
September 8	10:30 pm	**Illinois**	Arizona State	Sun Devil Stadium • Tempe, Arizona	ESPN	**L** 14-45	54,128

=== Week 3 ===
Date	Time	Visiting team	Home team	Site	Broadcast	Result	Attendance
September 15	12:00 pm	Arkansas State	NR / #24 **Nebraska**	Memorial Stadium • Lincoln, Nebraska	ESPN2	**W** 42-13	85,290
September 15	12:00 pm	California	#12 / NR **Ohio State**	Ohio Stadium • Columbus, Ohio	ABC	**W** 35-28	105,232
September 15	12:00 pm	Charleston Southern	**Illinois**	Memorial Stadium • Champaign, Illinois	BTN	**W** 44-0	45,369
September 15	12:00 pm	Eastern Michigan	**Purdue**	Ross–Ade Stadium • West Lafayette, Indiana	BTN	**W** 54-16	40,217
September 15	12:00 pm	Western Michigan	**Minnesota**	TCF Bank Stadium • Minneapolis, Minnesota	BTN	**W** 28-23	44,921
September 15	3:30 pm	Boston College	**Northwestern**	Ryan Field • Evanston, Illinois	BTN	**W** 22-13	32,597
September 15	3:30 pm	Massachusetts	#17 / #18 **Michigan**	Michigan Stadium • Ann Arbor, Michigan	BTN	**W** 63-13	110,708
September 15	3:30 pm	Navy	**Penn State**	Beaver Stadium • State College, Pennsylvania	ABC / ESPN2	**W** 34-7	98,792
September 15	3:30 pm	Northern Iowa	**Iowa**	Kinnick Stadium • Iowa City, Iowa	BTN	**W** 27-16	70,585
September 15	8:00 pm	Ball State	**Indiana**	Memorial Stadium • Bloomington, Indiana	BTN	**L** 39-41	48,186
September 15	8:00 pm	#20 / #19 Notre Dame	#10 / #10 **Michigan State**	Spartan Stadium • East Lansing, Michigan	ABC	**L** 3-20	79,219
September 15	8:00 pm	Utah State	NR / #22 **Wisconsin**	Camp Randall Stadium • Madison, Wisconsin	BTN	**W** 16-14	79,332

=== Week 4 ===
Date	Time	Visiting team	Home team	Site	Broadcast	Result	Attendance
September 22	12:00 pm	Central Michigan	**Iowa**	Kinnick Stadium • Iowa City, Iowa	BTN	**L** 31-32	70,585
September 22	12:00 pm	Alabama-Birmingham	#16 / NR **Ohio State**	Ohio Stadium • Columbus, Ohio	BTN	**W** 29-15	105,019
September 22	12:00 pm	Texas-El Paso	NR / #24 **Wisconsin**	Camp Randall Stadium • Madison, Wisconsin	ESPN2	**W** 37-26	79,806
September 22	3:30 pm	Eastern Michigan	#21 / #20 **Michigan State**	Spartan Stadium • East Lansing, Michigan	BTN	**W** 23-7	74,204
September 22	3:30 pm	Idaho State	#25 / #22 **Nebraska**	Memorial Stadium • Lincoln, Nebraska	BTN	**W** 73-7	84,923
September 22	3:30 pm	South Dakota	**Northwestern**	Ryan Field • Evanston, Illinois	BTN	**W** 38-7	28,641
September 22	3:30 pm	Temple	**Penn State**	Beaver Stadium • State College, Pennsylvania	ABC / ESPN2	**W** 24-13	93,680
September 22	7:30 pm	#18 / #17 **Michigan**	#11 / #15 Notre Dame	Notre Dame Stadium • South Bend, Indiana	NBC	**L** 6-13	80,795
September 22	8:00 pm	Louisiana Tech	**Illinois**	Memorial Stadium • Champaign, Illinois	BTN	**L** 17-52	46,539
September 22	8:00 pm	Syracuse	**Minnesota**	TCF Bank Stadium • Minneapolis	BTN	**W** 17-10	50,805

Date	Bye Week	Bye Week
September 22	Indiana	Purdue

=== Week 5 ===
Date	Time	Visiting team	Home team	Site	TV	Result	Attendance	Ref.
September 29	12:00 pm	**Indiana**	**Northwestern**	Ryan Field • Evanston, Illinois	BTN	**NW** 44–29	33,129	
September 29	12:00 pm	**Minnesota**	**Iowa**	Kinnick Stadium • Iowa City, Iowa (Floyd of Rosedale)	ESPN2	**Iowa** 31–13	70,585	
September 29	12:00 pm	**Penn State**	**Illinois**	Memorial Stadium • Champaign, Illinois	ESPN	**PSU** 35–7	46,734	
September 29	3:30 pm	Marshall	**Purdue**	Ross–Ade Stadium • West Lafayette, Indiana	BTN	**W** 51–41	45,481	
September 29	3:30 pm	No. 14 **Ohio State**	No. 20 **Michigan State**	Spartan Stadium • East Lansing, Michigan	ABC	**OSU** 17–16	76,705	
September 29	8:00 pm	**Wisconsin**	No. 22 **Nebraska**	Memorial Stadium • Lincoln, Nebraska	ABC	**NEB** 30–27	85,962	
^{#}Rankings from AP Poll released prior to game. All times are in Eastern Time.

Date	Bye Week
September 29	Michigan

=== Week 6 ===
Date	Time	Visiting team	Home team	Site	TV	Result	Attendance	Ref.
October 6	12:00 pm	**Michigan State**	**Indiana**	Memorial Stadium • Bloomington, Indiana (Old Brass Spittoon)	BTN	**MSU** 31–27	45,979	
October 6	12:00 pm	No. 24 **Northwestern**	**Penn State**	Beaver Stadium • Happy Valley, Pennsylvania	ESPN	**PSU** 39–28	95,769	
October 6	3:30 pm	**Illinois**	**Wisconsin**	Camp Randall • Madison, Wisconsin	ABC / ESPN2	**WIS** 31–14	80,096	
October 6	4:00 pm	**Michigan**	**Purdue**	Ross–Ade Stadium • West Lafayette, Indiana	BTN	**MICH** 44–13	50,105	
October 6	8:00 pm	No. 21 **Nebraska**	No. 12 **Ohio State**	Ohio Stadium • Columbus, Ohio	ABC	**OSU** 63–38	106,102	
^{#}Rankings from AP Poll released prior to game. All times are in Eastern Time.

Date	Bye Week	Bye Week
October 6	Iowa	Minnesota

=== Week 7 ===
Date	Time	Visiting team	Home team	Site	TV	Result	Attendance	Ref.
October 13	12:00 pm	**Iowa**	**Michigan State**	Spartan Stadium • East Lansing, Michigan	ESPN	**Iowa** 19–16 ^{2OT}	70,211	
October 13	12:00 pm	**Northwestern**	**Minnesota**	TCF Bank Stadium • Minneapolis	ESPN2	**NW** 21–13	49,651	
October 13	12:00 pm	**Wisconsin**	**Purdue**	Ross–Ade Stadium • West Lafayette, Indiana	BTN	**WIS** 38–14	46,007	
October 13	3:30 pm	**Illinois**	No. 25 **Michigan**	Michigan Stadium • Ann Arbor, Michigan	ABC	**MICH** 45–0	110,992	
October 13	8:00 pm	No. 8 **Ohio State**	**Indiana**	Memorial Stadium • Bloomington, Indiana	BTN	**OSU** 52–49	48,880	
^{#}Rankings from AP Poll released prior to game. All times are in Eastern Time.

Date	Bye Week	Bye Week
October 13	Nebraska	Penn State

=== Week 8 ===
Date	Time	Visiting team	Home team	Site	TV	Result	Attendance	Ref.
October 20	12:00 pm	Minnesota	**Wisconsin**	Camp Randall Stadium • Madison, Wisconsin (Paul Bunyan's Axe)	ESPNU	**WIS** 38–13	80,587	
October 20	12:00 pm	Purdue	No. 7 **Ohio State**	Ohio Stadium • Columbus, Ohio	ABC / ESPN2	**OSU** 29–22 ^{OT}	105,290	
October 20	3:30 pm	Indiana	Navy	Navy–Marine Corps Memorial Stadium • Annapolis, Maryland	CBS Sports Network	**L** 31–30	33,441	
October 20	3:30 pm	Michigan State	No. 23 **Michigan**	Michigan Stadium • Ann Arbor, Michigan (Paul Bunyan Trophy)	BTN	**MICH** 12–10	113,833	
October 20	3:30 pm	Nebraska	**Northwestern**	Ryan Field • Evanston, Illinois	ABC / ESPN2	**NEB** 29–28	47,330	
October 20	8:00 pm	Penn State	**Iowa**	Kinnick Stadium • Iowa City, Iowa	BTN	**PSU** 38–14	70,585	
^{#}Rankings from AP Poll released prior to game. All times are in Eastern Time.

Date	Bye Week
October 20	Illinois

=== Week 9 ===
Date	Time	Visiting team	Home team	Site	TV	Result	Attendance	Ref.
October 27	12:00 pm	Indiana	Illinois	Memorial Stadium • Champaign, Illinois	BTN	**IND** 31–17	47,981	
October 27	12:00 pm	Iowa	Northwestern	Ryan Field • Evanston, Illinois	ESPN2	**NW** 28–17	44,121	
October 27	3:30 pm	Michigan State	Wisconsin	Camp Randall Stadium • Madison, Wisconsin	ABC / ESPN2	**MSU** 16–13 ^{OT}	80,538	
October 27	3:30 pm	Purdue	Minnesota	TCF Bank Stadium • Minneapolis, Minnesota	BTN	**MN** 44–28	41,062	
October 27	5:30 pm	Ohio State	Penn State	Beaver Stadium • State College, Pennsylvania (Ohio State–Penn State football rivalry)	ESPN	**OSU** 35–23	107,818	
October 27	8:00 pm	Michigan	Nebraska	Memorial Stadium • Lincoln, Nebraska	ESPN2	**NEB** 23–9	86,160	
^{#}Rankings from AP Poll released prior to game. All times are in Eastern Time.

=== Week 10 ===
Date	Time	Visiting team	Home team	Site	TV	Result	Attendance	Ref.
November 3	12:00 pm	**Michigan**	**Minnesota**	TCF Bank Stadium • Minneapolis (Little Brown Jug)	BTN	**MICH** 35–13	48,801	
November 3	3:30 pm	**Illinois**	No. 6 **Ohio State**	Ohio Stadium • Columbus, Ohio (Illinois-Ohio State football rivalry)	ESPN	**OSU** 52–22	105,311	
November 3	3:30 pm	**Iowa**	**Indiana**	Memorial Stadium • Bloomington, Indiana	BTN	**IND** 24–21	40,646	
November 3	3:30 pm	No. 21 **Nebraska**	**Michigan State**	Spartan Stadium • East Lansing, Michigan	ABC / ESPN2	**NEB** 28–24	73,522	
November 3	3:30 pm	**Penn State**	**Purdue**	Ross–Ade Stadium • West Lafayette	ESPNU	**PSU** 34–9	40,098	
^{#}Rankings from AP Poll released prior to game. All times are in Eastern Time.

Date	Bye Week	Bye Week
November 3	Northwestern	Wisconsin

=== Week 11 ===
Date	Time	Visiting team	Home team	Site	TV	Result	Attendance	Ref.
November 10	12:00 pm	**Northwestern**	**Michigan**	Michigan Stadium • Ann Arbor, Michigan	ESPN	**MICH** 38–31 ^{OT}	112,510	
November 10	12:00 pm	**Wisconsin**	**Indiana**	Memorial Stadium • Bloomington, Indiana	ESPN2	**WIS** 62–14	43,240	
November 10	12:00 pm	**Purdue**	**Iowa**	Kinnick Stadium • Iowa City, Iowa	BTN	**PUR** 27–24	70,585	
November 10	3:30 pm	**Minnesota**	**Illinois**	Memorial Stadium • Champaign, Illinois	BTN	**MINN** 17–3	46,912	
November 10	3:30 pm	**Penn State**	No. 18 **Nebraska**	Memorial Stadium • Lincoln, Nebraska	ABC / ESPN2	**NEB** 32–23	85,527	
^{#}Rankings from AP Poll released prior to game. All times are in Eastern Time.

Date	Bye Week	Bye Week
November 10	Michigan State	Ohio State

=== Week 12 ===
Date	Time	Visiting team	Home team	Site	TV	Result	Attendance	Ref.
November 17	12:00 pm	**Indiana**	**Penn State**	Beaver Stadium • University Park, Pennsylvania	BTN	**PSU** 45–22	90,358	
November 17	12:00 pm	**Iowa**	No. 23 **Michigan**	Michigan Stadium • Ann Arbor, Michigan	ESPN	**MICH** 42–17	113,016	
November 17	12:00 pm	**Northwestern**	**Michigan State**	Spartan Stadium • East Lansing, Michigan	ESPN2	**NW** 23–20	75,101	
November 17	3:30 pm	**Minnesota**	No. 16 **Nebraska**	Memorial Stadium • Lincoln, Nebraska	BTN	**NEB** 38–14	85,330	
November 17	3:30 pm	No. 6 **Ohio State**	**Wisconsin**	Camp Randall Stadium • Madison, Wisconsin	ABC / ESPN2	**OSU** 21–14 ^{OT}	80,112	
November 17	3:30 pm	**Purdue**	**Illinois**	Memorial Stadium • Champaign, Illinois (Purdue Cannon)	BTN	**PUR** 20–17	41,974	
^{#}Rankings from AP Poll released prior to game. All times are in Eastern Time.

=== Week 13 ===
Date	Time	Visiting team	Home team	Site	TV	Result	Attendance	Ref.
November 23	12:00 pm	No. 17 **Nebraska**	**Iowa**	Kinnick Stadium • Iowa City, Iowa (Heroes Game)	ABC	**NEB** 13–7	69,805	
November 24	12:00 pm	No. 20 **Michigan**	No. 4 **Ohio State**	Ohio Stadium • Columbus, Ohio (The Game)	ABC	**OSU** 26–21	105,889	
November 24	12:00 pm	**Illinois**	**Northwestern**	Ryan Field • Evanston, Illinois (Land of Lincoln Trophy)	BTN	**NW** 50–14	32,415	
November 24	12:00 pm	**Indiana**	**Purdue**	Ross–Ade Stadium • West Lafayette (Old Oaken Bucket)	BTN	**PUR** 56–35	42,638	
November 24	3:30 pm	**Michigan State**	**Minnesota**	TCF Bank Stadium • Minneapolis	BTN	**MSU** 26–10	44,194	
November 24	3:30 pm	**Wisconsin**	**Penn State**	Beaver Stadium • University Park, Pennsylvania	ESPN2	**PSU** 24–21 ^{OT}	93,505	
^{#}Rankings from AP Poll released prior to game. All times are in Eastern Time.

=== Week 14 – Big Ten Championship Game ===
Date	Time	Visiting team	Home team	Site	TV	Result	Attendance	Ref.
December 1	8:00 pm	No. 14 **Nebraska**	**Wisconsin**	Lucas Oil Stadium • Indianapolis (2012 Big Ten Championship)	FOX	**WIS** 70–31	41,260	
^{#}Rankings from AP Poll released prior to game. All times are in Eastern Time.

== Homecoming games ==
September 29

- Minnesota @ Iowa (Iowa's record in homecoming games is 54-41-5)
- Wisconsin @ Nebraska 7 pm CT ABC, ESPN, or ESPN2 (Nebraska's record in homecoming games is 75-22-4)

October 6

- Michigan State @ Indiana (Indiana's record in homecoming games is 44-49-6)
- Nebraska @ Ohio State 8 pm ET ABC, ESPN, or ESPN2
- Northwestern @ Penn State (Penn State's record in homecoming games is 66-21-5)

October 13

- Illinois @ Michigan (Michigan's record in homecoming games is 84–27)
- Iowa @ Michigan State (Michigan State's record in homecoming games is 63-30-3)
- Northwestern @ Minnesota
- Wisconsin @ Purdue (Purdue's record in homecoming games is 50-35-4)

October 27

- Indiana @ Illinois (Illinois' record in homecoming games is 44-55-2)
- Iowa @ Northwestern
- Michigan State @ Wisconsin

== Bowl games ==
The Big Ten has agreements with the following bowls:

Bowl Game	Date	Site	Television	Time (EST)	Visiting team	Home team	Score	Attendance	Ref.
Meineke Car Care Bowl of Texas	December 28	Reliant Stadium • Houston, Texas	ESPN	9:00 pm	Minnesota	Texas Tech	L 31–34	50,386	
Buffalo Wild Wings Bowl	December 29	Sun Devil Stadium • Tempe, Arizona	ESPN	10:15 pm	Texas Christian	Michigan State	W 17–16	44,617	
Gator Bowl	January 1	EverBank Field • Jacksonville, Florida	ESPN2	12:00 pm	Mississippi State	#21 Northwestern	W 34–20	48,612	
Heart of Dallas Bowl	January 1	Cotton Bowl • Dallas, Texas	ESPNU	12:00 pm	Purdue	Oklahoma State	L 14–58	48,313	
Outback Bowl	January 1	Raymond James Stadium • Tampa, Florida	ESPN	1:00 pm	#11 South Carolina	#19 Michigan	L 28–33	54,527	
Capital One Bowl	January 1	Citrus Bowl • Orlando, Florida	ABC	1:00 pm	#6 Georgia	#23 Nebraska	L 31–45	59,712	
Rose Bowl	January 1	Rose Bowl • Pasadena, California	ESPN	5:00 pm	Wisconsin	#8 Stanford	L 14–20	93,359	

Two name changes for Big Ten bowls this year. The Buffalo Wild Wings Bowl used to be known as the Insight Bowl and the Heart of Dallas Bowl used to be known as the TicketCity Bowl.

With only seven bowl eligible teams, the Big Ten is unable to place a team in the eighth bowl game they are contracted with, the Little Caesars Pizza Bowl.

== 2013 NFL draft ==
Team	Round 1	Round 2	Round 3	Round 4	Round 5	Round 6	Round 7	Total
Illinois			1	1	1		1	4
Indiana								
Iowa					1			1
Michigan					1	1		2
Michigan State		1		2				3
Minnesota								
Nebraska						1	1	2
Northwestern								
Ohio State		1		1			1	3
Penn State			1	1		1	1	4
Purdue		1						1
Wisconsin	1	1			1			3

Rnd.	Pick	Team	Player	Pos.	College	Notes
1	31	Dallas Cowboys	Travis Frederick	C	Wisconsin	from San Francisco
2	44	Carolina Panthers	Kawann Short	DT	Purdue	
2	48	Pittsburgh Steelers	Le'Veon Bell	RB	Michigan State	
2	49	New York Giants	Johnathan Hankins	DT	Ohio State	
2	58	Denver Broncos	Montee Ball	RB	Wisconsin	
3	86	Indianapolis Colts	Hugh Thornton	G	Illinois	
3	87	Seattle Seahawks	Jordan Hill	DT	Penn State	
4	100	Tampa Bay Buccaneers	Akeem Spence	DT	Illinois	from Oakland
4	106	Miami Dolphins	Dion Sims	TE	Michigan State	from New Orleans via New York
4	120	Minnesota Vikings	Gerald Hodges	LB	Penn State	
4	126	Tampa Bay Buccaneers	William Gholston	DE	Michigan State	from New England
4	129	Baltimore Ravens	John Simon	DE	Ohio State	
5	135	Jacksonville Jaguars	Denard Robinson	WR	Michigan	
5	150	Pittsburgh Steelers	Terry Hawthorne	CB	Illinois	
5	159	Green Bay Packers	Micah Hyde	CB	Iowa	
5*	168	Baltimore Ravens	Ricky Wagner	T	Wisconsin	
6	178	New York Jets	William Campbell	G	Michigan	
6	186	Pittsburgh Steelers	Justin Brown	WR	Penn State	
6	190	Cincinnati Bengals	Rex Burkhead	RB	Nebraska	
7	213	Minnesota Vikings	Michael Mauti	LB	Penn State	from Arizona (Note: No. 213: Arizona → Minnesota (PD). see No. 176: Minnesota → Arizona.)
7	226	New England Patriots	Michael Buchanan	DE	Illinois	from Chicago via Tampa Bay (Note: No. 226: multiple trades: No. 226: Chicago → Tampa Bay (PD). Chicago traded this selection to Tampa Bay in exchange for defensive tackle Brian Price. No. 226: Tampa Bay → New England (PD). see No. 126: New England → Tampa Bay.)
7*	240	Cincinnati Bengals	Reid Fragel	T	Ohio State	
7*	248	Tennessee Titans	Daimion Stafford	S	Nebraska	

== Records against FBS conferences ==
2012 records against FBS conferences:

Through January 1, 2013

Conference	Record
ACC	(1-1)
Big East	(3-0)
Big 12	(1-3)
C-USA	(5-0)
Independents	(1-4)
MAC	(9-3)
Mountain West	(3-0)
Pac-12	(1-4)
SEC	(2-3)
Sun Belt	(1-0)
WAC	(1-1)
TOTAL	(28-19)

== Players of the week ==
Week	Offensive			Defensive			Special Teams			Freshman		
Week	Player	Position	Team	Player	Position	Team	Player	Position	Team	Player	Position	Team
September 3	Le'Veon Bell	RB	MSU	Derrick Wells	DB	MINN	Mike Myer	PK	Iowa	Frankie Williams	DB	PUR
September 3	Taylor Martinez	QB	NEB	Derrick Wells	DB	MINN	Venric Mark	PR/KR	NW	Frankie Williams	DB	PUR
September 10	Denard Robinson	QB	MICH	Chi Chi Ariguzo	LB	NW	Cody Webster	P	PUR	Devin Funchess	TE	MICH
September 17	Braxton Miller	QB	OSU	Michael Mauti	LB	PSU	Jeff Budzien	PK	NW	Nate Sudfeld	QB	IND
September 17	Braxton Miller	QB	OSU	Michael Mauti	LB	PSU	Jeff Budzien	PK	NW	Deion Barnes	DE	PSU
September 24	Le'Veon Bell	RB	MSU	Chris Borland	LB	WIS	Ameer Abdullah	PR	NEB	Imani Cross	RB	NEB
Oct. 1	Taylor Martinez	QB	NEB	Michael Mauti	LB	PSU	Brett Maher	PK/P	NEB	Mason Monheim	LB	ILL
Oct. 1	Kain Colter	QB	NW	Michael Mauti	LB	PSU	Brett Maher	PK/P	NEB	Mason Monheim	LB	ILL
Oct. 8	Denard Robinson	QB	MICH	Gerald Hodges	LB	PSU	Corey Brown	PR	OSU	Aaron Burbridge	WR	MSU
Oct. 8	Carlos Hyde	RB	OSU	Gerald Hodges	LB	PSU	Corey Brown	PR	OSU	Aaron Burbridge	WR	MSU
Oct. 15	Montee Ball	RB	WIS	Jake Ryan	LB	MICH	Mike Myer	PK	Iowa	Nick VanHoose	CB	NW
Oct. 22	Taylor Martinez	QB	NEB	Jordan Hill	DT	PSU	Brendan Gibbons	PK	MICH	Kyle Carter	TE	PSU
Oct. 29	Kain Colter	QB	NW	Ryan Shazier	LB	OSU	Brett Maher	PK/P	NEB	Philip Nelson	QB	MIN
Oct. 29	Kain Colter	QB	NW	Michael Carter	DB	MIN	Brett Maher	PK/P	NEB	David Santos	LB	NEB
Nov. 5	Cody Latimer	WR	IND	Ryan Shazier	LB	OSU	Mike Sadler	P	MSU	Bri'onte Dunn	RB	OSU
Nov. 5	Taylor Martinez	QB	NEB	Ryan Shazier	LB	OSU	Mike Sadler	P	MSU	Bri'onte Dunn	RB	OSU
Nov. 12	Devin Gardner	QB	MICH	Kawaan Short	DT	PUR	Brett Maher	P/PK	NEB	Mason Monheim	LB	ILL
Nov. 12	Montee Ball	RB	WIS	Kawaan Short	DT	PUR	Brett Maher	P/PK	NEB	Mason Monheim	LB	ILL
Nov. 19	Devin Gardner	QB	MICH	John Simon	DE	OSU	Corey Brown	PR	OSU	James Ross	LB	MICH
Nov. 19	Matt McGloin	QB	PSU	John Simon	DE	OSU	Corey Brown	PR	OSU	Dan Vitale	SB	NW
Nov. 26	Le'Veon Bell	RB	MSU	Jordan Hill	DT	PSU	Sam Ficken	PK	PSU	Frankie Williams	DB	PUR
Nov. 26	Robert Mavre	QB	PUR	Jordan Hill	DT	PSU	Sam Ficken	PK	PSU	Frankie Williams	DB	PUR

== Players of the Year ==
Award	Player	School
Graham-George Offensive Player of the Year	Braxton Miller	Ohio State
Nagurski-Woodson Defensive Player of the Year	John Simon	Ohio State
Thompson-Randle El Freshman of the Year	Deion Barnes	Penn State
Griese-Brees Quarterback of the Year	Braxton Miller	Ohio State
Richter-Howard Receiver of the Year	Allen Robinson	Penn State
Ameche-Dayne Running Back of the Year	Montee Ball	Wisconsin
Kwalick-Clark Tight End of the Year	Jacob Pedersen	Wisconsin
Rimington-Pace Offensive Lineman of the Year	Taylor Lewan	Michigan
Smith-Brown Defensive Lineman of the Year	John Simon	Ohio State
Butkus-Fitzgerald Linebacker of the Year	Michael Mauti	Penn State
Tatum-Woodson Defensive Back of the Year	Micah Hyde	Iowa
Bakken-Andersen Co-Kicker of the Year	Brett Maher	Nebraska
Bakken-Andersen Co-Kicker of the Year	Jeff Budzien	Northwestern
Eddleman-Fields Punter of the Year	Will Hagerup	Michigan
Dave McClain/Hayes-Schembechler Coach of the Year	Bill O'Brien	Penn State

== All-Conference Players ==
Coaches All-Conference Selections

Position	Player	Class	Team
First Team Offense (Coaches)
QB	Taylor Martinez	Jr.	Nebraska
RB	Le'Veon Bell	Sr.	Michigan State
RB	Montee Ball	Sr.	Wisconsin
WR	Allen Robinson	Jr.	Penn State
WR	Jared Abbrederis	Jr.	Wisconsin
TE	Jacob Pedersen	Jr.	Wisconsin
OT	Tayor Lewan	Jr.	Michigan
OG	Patrick Omameh	Sr.	Michigan
C	Matt Stankiewitch	Sr.	Penn State
OG	Spencer Long	Jr.	Nebraska
OG	John Urschel	Jr.	Penn State
OT	Rick Wagner	Sr.	Wisconsin
First Team Defense (Coaches)
DL	Johnathan Hankins	Jr.	Ohio State
DL	John Simon	Sr.	Ohio State
DL	Jordan Hill	Sr.	Penn State
DL	Kawann Short	Sr.	Purdue
LB	Max Bullough	Jr.	Michigan State
LB	Michael Mauti	Sr.	Penn State
LB	Chris Borland	Jr.	Wisconsin
DB	Micah Hyde	Sr.	Iowa
DB	Johnny Adams	Sr.	Michigan State
DB	Darqueze Dennard	Jr.	Michigan State
DB	Bradley Roby	So.	Ohio State
First Team Special Teams (Coaches)
PK	Jeff Budzien	Jr.	Northwestern
P	Mike Sadler	So.	Michigan State

Position	Player	Class	Team
Second Team Offense (Coaches)
QB	Braxton Miller	So.	Ohio State
RB	Ameer Abdullah	So.	Nebraska
RB	Venric Mark	Jr.	Northwestern
RB	Carlos Hyde	Jr.	Ohio State
WR	Kenny Bell	So.	Nebraska
WR	Corey Brown	Jr.	Ohio State
TE	Dion Sims	Jr.	Michigan State
OT	Hugh Thornton	Sr.	Illinois
OG	Ryan Groy	Jr.	Wisconsin
C	James Ferentz	Sr.	Iowa
OG	(none)		
OT	Jeremiah Sirles	Jr.	Nebraska
Second Team Defense (Coaches)
DL	Michael Buchanan	Sr.	Illinois
DL	Adam Replogle	Sr.	Indiana
DL	Craig Roh	Sr.	Michigan
DL	Eric Martin	Sr.	Nebraska
DL	Baker Steinkuhler	Sr.	Nebraska
LB	Will Compton	Sr.	Nebraska
LB	Ryan Shazier	So.	Ohio State
LB	Gerald Hodges	Sr.	Penn State
DB	Jordan Kovacs	Sr.	Michigan
DB	Daimion Stafford	Sr.	Nebraska
DB	Christian Bryant	Sr.	Ohio State
DB	Ricardo Allen	Jr.	Purdue
Second Team Special Teams (Coaches)
PK	Brett Maher	Sr.	Nebraska
P	Brett Maher	Sr.	Nebraska

HONORABLE MENTION: Illinois: Akeem Spence; Indiana: Ted Bolser, Dan Feeney, Cody Latimer, Jason Spriggs; Iowa: C.J. Fiedorowicz, Anthony Hitchens, Mike Meyer, Matt Tobin; Michigan: J.T. Floyd, Jeremy Gallon, Brendan Gibbons, Will Hagerup, Roy Roundtree, Jake Ryan; Michigan State: Denicos Allen, William Gholston, Isaiah Lewis, Chris McDonald, Marcus Rush; Minnesota: Michael Carter; Nebraska: Ben Cotton, Ciante Evans, Justin Jackson, P.J. Smith; Northwestern: Ibraheim Campbell, Brian Mulroe, Tyler Scott, Patrick Ward; Ohio State: C.J. Barnett, Travis Howard, Corey Linsley, Jack Mewhort, Andrew Norwell; Penn State: Adrian Amos, Deion Barnes, Kyle Carter, Mike Farrell, Matt McGloin, Stephon Morris; Purdue: Antavian Edison, Josh Johnson, Cody Webster; Wisconsin: Beau Allen, Marcus Cromartie, Travis Frederick, David Gilbert, Ethan Hemer, Drew Meyer, Devin Smith, Dezmen Southward, Mike Taylor

There was a tie among the Coaches for the Offensive Guard honor, so three players received the first team honor and only one on the second team. Coaches also selected three second-team running backs and three second-team defensive linemen.

Media All-Conference Selections

Position	Player	Class	Team
First Team Offense (Media)
QB	Braxton Miller	So.	Ohio State
RB	Le'Veon Bell	Sr.	Michigan State
RB	Montee Ball	Sr.	Wisconsin
WR	Allen Robinson	Jr.	Penn State
WR	Jared Abbrederis	Jr.	Wisconsin
TE	Kyle Carter	So.	Penn State
OT	Tayor Lewan	Jr.	Michigan
OG	Andrew Norwell	Jr.	Ohio State
C	Travis Frederick	Sr.	Wisconsin
OG	Spencer Long	Jr.	Nebraska
OT	Rick Wagner	Sr.	Wisconsin
First Team Defense (Media)
DL	Eric Martin	Sr.	Nebraska
DL	John Simon	Sr.	Ohio State
DL	Jordan Hill	Sr.	Penn State
DL	Kawann Short	Sr.	Purdue
LB	Ryan Shazier	So.	Ohio State
LB	Michael Mauti	Sr.	Penn State
LB	Mike Taylor	Sr.	Wisconsin
DB	Micah Hyde	Sr.	Iowa
DB	Daimion Stafford	Sr.	Nebraska
DB	Travis Howard	Sr.	Ohio State
DB	Bradley Roby	So.	Ohio State
First Team Special Teams (Media)
PK	Brett Maher	Sr.	Nebraska
P	Will Hagerup	Jr.	Michigan

Position	Player	Class	Team
Second Team Offense (Media)
QB	Taylor Martinez	Jr.	Nebraska
RB	Venric Mark	Jr.	Northwestern
RB	Carlos Hyde	Jr.	Ohio State
WR	Kenny Bell	So.	Nebraska
WR	Cody Latimer	So.	Indiana
TE	Dion Sims	Jr.	Michigan State
OT	Jack Mewhort	Jr.	Ohio State
OG	Brian Mulroe	Sr.	Northwestern
C	James Ferentz	Sr.	Iowa
OG	John Urschel	Jr.	Penn State
OT	Jeremiah Sirles	Jr.	Nebraska
Second Team Defense (Media)
DL	William Gholston	Jr.	Michigan State
DL	Adam Replogle	Sr.	Indiana
DL	D.L. Wilhite	Sr.	Minnesota
DL	Johnathan Hankins	Jr.	Ohio State
LB	Jake Ryan	Jr.	Michigan
LB	Max Bullough	Jr.	Michigan State
LB	Gerald Hodges	Sr.	Penn State
DB	Johnny Adams	Sr.	Michigan State
DB	Darqueze Dennard	Jr.	Michigan State
DB	Josh Johnson	Sr.	Purdue
DB	Devin Smith	Sr.	Wisconsin
Second Team Special Teams (Media)
PK	Jeff Budzien	Jr.	Northwestern
P	Mike Sadler	So.	Michigan State

HONORABLE MENTION: Illinois: Jonathan Brown, Michael Buchanan, Terry Hawthorne, Graham Pocic, Akeem Spence, Hugh Thornton; Indiana: Ted Bolser, Mitch Ewald, Dan Feeney, Greg Heban, Will Matte, Jason Spriggs, Shane Wynn; Iowa: C.J. Fiedorowicz, James Ferentz, Joe Gaglione, Anthony Hitchens, Mike Meyer, James Morris; Michigan: William Campbell, J.T. Floyd, Devin Funchess, Jeremy Gallon, Brendan Gibbons, Jordan Kovacs, Patrick Omameh, Denard Robinson, Craig Roh, Roy Roundtree; Michigan State: Denicos Allen, Isaiah Lewis, Chris McDonald, Marcus Rush; Minnesota: Michael Carter, Ra'Shede Hageman, Troy Stoudermire; Nebraska: Ameer Abdullah, Will Compton, Ben Cotton, Ciante Evans, Justin Jackson, Brett Maher (punter), Kyler Reed, P.J. Smith, Baker Steinkuhler; Northwestern: Chi Chi Ariguzo, Ibraheim Campbell, Kain Colter, David Nwabuisi, Damien Proby, Tyler Scott, Patrick Ward; Ohio State: C.J. Barnett, Corey Brown, Christian Bryant, Reid Fragel, Corey Linsley, Etienne Sabino; Penn State: Adrian Amos, Deion Barnes, Mike Farrell, Matt McGloin, Stephon Morris, Sean Stanley, Zach Zwinak; Purdue: Ricardo Allen, Antavian Edison, Landon Feichter, Cody Webster; Wisconsin: Beau Allen, Chris Borland, Marcus Cromartie, David Gilbet, Ryan Groy, Drew Meyer, Jacob Pedersen, Dezmen Southward

== First Team All-Americans ==
There are many outlets that award All-America honors in football. The NCAA uses five official selectors to also determine Consensus and Unanimous All-America honors. The five teams used by the NCAA to compile the consensus team are from the Associated Press, the AFCA, the FWAA, The Sporting News and the Walter Camp Football Foundation. A point system is used to calculate the consensus honors. The point system consists of three points for first team, two points for second team and three points for third team. No honorable mention or fourth team or lower are used in the computation.

The teams are compiled by position and the player accumulating the most points at each position is named a Consensus All-American. If there is a tie at a position in football for first team then the players who are tied shall be named to the team. A player named first-team by all five of the NCAA-recognized selectors is recognized as a Unanimous All-American.

Player	School	Position	Selector	Consensus/Unanimous
Montee Ball	Wisconsin	RB	AFCA, Walter Camp, AP, ESPN, Pro Football Weekly	Consensus
Taylor Lewan	Michigan	OL	Walter Camp, AP, ESPN, Sports Illustrated	
Travis Frederick	Wisconsin	OL	Pro Football Weekly	
Johnathan Hankins	Ohio State	DL	Scout.com	
Venric Mark	Northwestern	PR	Sporting News, FWAA, CBS Sports	
Michael Mauti	Penn State	LB	ESPN	
Bradley Roby	Ohio State	CB	ESPN	

== Academic All-Americans ==
The following players were first team Academic All-Americans: Rex Burkhead (NEB), Patrick Ward (NW), and Pete Massaro (PSU) all repeated from the 2011 first team. John Urschel (PSU) and Adam Replogle (IND) were also first team selections.

== National award winners ==
- Montee Ball, Wisconsin – Doak Walker Award

== Attendance ==
Team	Stadium	Capacity	Game 1	Game 2	Game 3	Game 4	Game 5	Game 6	Game 7	Game 8	Total	Average	% of Capacity
Illinois	Memorial Stadium	60,670	43,441	45,369	46,539	46,734	47,981	46,912	41,974	—	318,950	45,564	75.1%
Indiana	Memorial Stadium	52,929	41,882	48,186	45,979	48,880	40,646	43,240	—	—	268,813	44,802	84.6%
Iowa	Kinnick Stadium	70,585	70,585	70,585	70,585	70,585	70,585	70,585	69,805	—	493,315	70,473	99.8%
Michigan	Michigan Stadium	109,901	112,522	110,708	110,922	113,833	112,510	113,016	—	—	673,511	112,251	102.1%
Michigan State	Spartan Stadium	75,005	78,709	79,219	74,204	76,705	70,211	73,522	75,101	—	527,671	75,381	100.5%
Minnesota	TCF Bank Stadium	50,805	47,022	44,921	50,805	49,651	41,062	48,801	44,194	—	326,456	46,636	91.8%
Nebraska	Memorial Stadium	81,067	85,425	85,290	84,923	85,962	86,160	85,527	85,330	—	598,617	85,517	105.5%
Northwestern	Ryan Field	47,130	31,644	32,597	28,641	33,129	47,330	44,121	32,415	—	249,877	35,696	75.7%
Ohio State	Ohio Stadium	102,329	105,039	104,745	105,232	105,019	106,102	105,290	105,311	105,899	842,637	105,329	102.9%
Penn State	Beaver Stadium	106,572	97,186	98,792	93,680	95,769	107,818	90,358	93,505	—	676,308	96,615	90.6%
Purdue	Ross–Ade Stadium	62,500	40,572	40,217	45,481	50,105	46,007	40,098	42,638	—	305,118	43,588	69.7%
Wisconsin	Camp Randall Stadium	80,321	79,568	79,332	79,806	80,096	80,587	80,538	80,112	—	560,039	80,005	99.6%

== Head coaches ==
- Tim Beckman, Illinois
- Kevin R. Wilson, Indiana
- Kirk Ferentz, Iowa
- Brady Hoke, Michigan
- Mark Dantonio, Michigan State
- Jerry Kill, Minnesota
- Bo Pelini, Nebraska
- Pat Fitzgerald, Northwestern
- Urban Meyer, Ohio State
- Bill O'Brien, Penn State
- Danny Hope, Purdue
- Bret Bielema, Wisconsin
