= Venric Mark =

American football player

Profile
- Position: Running back

Personal information
- Born: Houston, Texas, U.S.
- Listed height: 5 ft 7 in (1.70 m)
- Listed weight: 172 lb (78 kg)

Career information
- High school: St. Pius X (Houston)
- College: Northwestern; West Texas A&M
- NFL draft: 2015: undrafted

Career history
- Ottawa RedBlacks (2016)*; Cedar Rapids Titans (2016)
- * Offseason or practice squad member only

Awards and highlights
- 2012 College Football All-America Team (1st team (punt returner): FWAA, CBS and TSN, honorable mention (all-purpose): SI); Second-team All-Big Ten (2012); 5x Texas Association of Private and Parochial Schools (TAPPS) Class 5A state track and field champion (LJ, TJ, 100m, 200m and 4x100m); Records: Northwestern single-game (273), single-season (915, 2011) and career (1881) kickoff return yards; Northwestern single-game punt return yards (134); TAPPS Class 5A state long jump record holder
- Stats at CFL.ca

Venric Emeka-Wococha Mark is an American former football player. A running back, return specialist and wide receiver, Mark attended 2014 West Texas A&M Buffaloes after previously playing for Northwestern. He completed his redshirt junior season for the 2013 Northwestern Wildcats team. He was a 2012 College Football All-America Team first team punt returner selection and a 2012 All-Big Ten team second team running back for the 2012 Wildcats. He holds Northwestern records for single-game, single-season and career kickoff return yards as well as the single-game punt return yards record.

In high school, he was a five-time Texas Association of Private and Parochial Schools state champion in track and field and an All-State football player. He was recruited by many Division I college football programs.

== Early life ==
Mark spent his freshman year at Klein Forest High School in Greater Houston. When the aftermath of Hurricane Katrina brought many troubled students to his public high school, he transferred to St. Pius X High School, a private school 45 minutes away. As a sophomore at St. Pius, Mark competed in the most events and scored the most points for his high school when it placed fifth in the 2008 Texas Association of Private and Parochial Schools (TAPPS) Class 6A Track and Field Championship. That year, he placed second in the long jump (21 feet 0.25 inches (6.41 m)); third in the triple jump (42 feet 11.5 inches (13.09 m)) and participated on medal winning 4 × 100 metres relay and 4 × 200 metres relay teams.

As a junior, he was described as a "gifted player" who was expected to be a "future star" for the two-time defending state champion football team. Going into the 2008 state playoffs, Mark had 10 touchdowns as a return specialist and 20 receptions for 504 yards for the 7–2 St. Pius Panthers. By the end of his junior year, he had been timed at 4.35 seconds in the 40-yard dash and had at least six Division I scholarship offers. Interested programs included Northwestern, Vanderbilt, Rice and Arizona. During the summer prior to his senior year, he increased the bodyweight of his 5-foot-8-inch (1.73 m) frame from 160 pounds (72.6 kg) to 175 pounds (79.4 kg).

As a senior, he mostly played running back. In the 2009 TAPPS Division I football semifinals, Mark had 102 yards on 16 carries, including two rushing touchdowns and a 33-yard receiving touchdown. However, he was stopped on fourth and goal to go from the 2-yard-line with 11 seconds left as the team lost to Nolan Catholic High School 36–28. Mark's senior season statistics were 23 receptions for 242 yards, 92 rushes for 772 yards and 20 total touchdowns (four on punt and kickoff returns). He also had seven touchdowns called back due to penalties. He was honored as a first team All-state selection. As a senior, he had 18 offers from schools including his five finalists: Northwestern, Arizona, Iowa State, Vanderbilt and Colorado as well as Houston, Baylor, UTEP, Virginia and Penn State. He was one of three major Division I National Letter of Intent signees from St. Pius along with Kirk Poston (defensive end, Colorado) and Greg Daniels (defensive end, Texas).

After committing to Northwestern, Mark went on to win five gold medals in the 2010 TAPPS Class 5A State Track and Field Championships. He won the 100 meters (10.96 seconds), 200 meters (22.26), long jump (23 feet 1 inch (7.04 m)-state record) and triple jump (44 feet 0.25 inches (13.42 m)). He was the anchor of the winning 4 × 100 metres relay (43.36). Mark was the state championship meet's elite athlete, scoring 45 of St. Pius' 86 points. The school finished as runner-up to St. Michael's Catholic Academy (88 points) in the state championships even though St. Pius' 4 × 200 metres relay team, which was a favorite, had been disqualified in earlier competition.

College recruiting
Name	Hometown	School	Height	Weight	40^{‡}	Commit date
Venric Mark; RB/KR/PR/WR	Tomball, Texas	Klein Forest High School (TX, Fr.); St. Pius X High School (TX, So.–Sr.)	5 ft 9.5 in (1.77 m)	160 lb (73 kg)	4.4	Jan 20, 2010
Venric Mark; RB/KR/PR/WR	Recruit ratings: Scout: Rivals: (73)					
Overall recruit ranking: Scout: 217 (WR) ESPN: 199 (ATH)
Note: In many cases, Scout, Rivals, 247Sports, On3, and ESPN may conflict in their listings of height and weight.; In these cases, the average was taken. ESPN grades are on a 100-point scale.; Sources: "2010 Northwestern Football Commits (rivals)". Rivals.; "2010 Northwestern Football Commits (scout)". Scout.; "ESPN". ESPN.; "Scout.com Team Recruiting Rankings". Scout.; "2010 Team Ranking". Rivals.com.

== College career ==
Mark was one of two true freshmen to play in every game for the 2010 Wildcats. On October 23, he had a 29-yard end-around run against Michigan State. On November 27, Mark recorded 273 return yards on nine kickoffs against Wisconsin. This established a Wildcat single-game kickoff return yard record (10 shy of a Big Ten Conference record) and tied the Big Ten record for single-game kickoff returns. It also earned Mark recognition as the Big Ten Special Teams and Freshman co-Player of the Week on November 29. Rivals.com recognized Mark with selection to its Freshman All-American second team as a punt returner.

As a sophomore for the 2011 team, Mark switched from wide receiver to running back during the season. However, during the game against Michigan, he also played linebacker in order to shadow Denard Robinson. The season ended at the 2011 Meineke Car Care Bowl of Texas against Texas A&M. In the game, Mark recorded 7 kickoff returns for 141 yards. This gave him Northwestern record-setting single-season totals of 40 returns and 915 return yards, surpassing records both set by Jim Pooler in 1974 (38 for 807). Mark also scored his first rushing touchdown in the game.

As a junior in 2012, Mark was a preseason watchlist candidate for the Paul Hornung Award. That year, he tallied 8 100-yard rushing games, the first 1000-yard rushing season for Northwestern since Tyrell Sutton in 2006, and the first unblocked punt return touchdown for Northwestern since Marquice Cole on September 10, 2005 against Northern Illinois. Northwestern had blocked a punt and returned it for a touchdown in the season opener on August 31, 2006, against Miami. In addition to scoring a punt return touchdown on September 1 against Syracuse, he broke both the Northwestern single-game punt return yards record (Lee Gissendaner, 121 vs. 1992 Stanford) with 134 yards and the 29-year-old career kickoff yards records (Ricky Edwards, 1,499, 1983) during a career-high-tying 281 all-purpose yards effort that earned him Big Ten Special Teams Player of the Week. His 82 rushing yards that day was a career-high. The subsequent week, he had his first 100-yard effort when he totaled 123 yards against Vanderbilt on September 8. Then he scored three rushing touchdowns on September 22 in a 117-yard effort against South Dakota. He set a new career-high on September 29 when he totaled 139 yards against Indiana. He scored a second punt return touchdown on October 6 against Penn State, making him the first Wildcat to score two punt return touchdowns in the same season (and second ever) since Tom Worthington in 1949. He then set his career high with 182 yards against Minnesota on October 13.

For his efforts, Mark was named a 2012 All-American first team selection by the Football Writers Association of America, CBS Sports and Sporting News as a punt returner. He was also an honorable mention All-American all-purpose selection by Sports Illustrated. Following the 2012 Big Ten Conference football season, Mark was a second team All-Big Ten selection as a running back by both the coaches and the media. He was one of ten semifinalists for the Doak Walker Award, awarded to the best running back.

Mark was among the 2012 national statistical leaders in both all-purpose yards and rushing yards.

Mark began the 2013 season affected by injury. He did not play special teams and mostly appeared in the August 31 opener against Cal in the fourth quarter. Mark did not play again until October 5 against Ohio State. He was sidelined again two weeks later.

Mark learned in early August 2014, that he would be suspended for two games from the 2014 Northwestern Wildcats football team for "violation of team policy". He decided to pursue his fifth year redshirt season with the Division II 2014 West Texas A&M Buffaloes where he could be close to his mother and grandmother.

== Professional career ==
Pre-draft measurables
Height	Weight	Arm length	Hand span	Wingspan	40-yard dash	10-yard split	20-yard split	20-yard shuttle	Three-cone drill	Vertical jump	Broad jump	Bench press
5 ft 6 3/4 in (1.70 m)	172 lb (78 kg)	29 7/8 in (0.76 m)	8 5/8 in (0.22 m)	5 ft 11 in (1.80 m)	4.69 s	1.61 s	2.68 s	4.51 s	7.34 s	32.0 in (0.81 m)	9 ft 2 in (2.79 m)	16 reps
All values from Pro Day

On December 8, 2015, Mark signed with the Ottawa RedBlacks of the Canadian Football League. He was released on April 27, 2016.

On June 2, 2016, Mark signed with the Cedar Rapids Titans of the Indoor Football League. He played in 2 games for the Titans during the 2016 regular season, rushing for 53 yards and 5 touchdowns. He also caught 3 passes for 15 yards and returned 2 kicks for 40 yards. He also played in the team's two playoff games, rushing for nine yards and three touchdowns. He also caught 6 passes for 40 yards and returned 5 kicks for 36 yards.

== Personal life ==
Mark's father has not been involved in his life since his preteen years; he was raised by his mother, Sheila Mark. Sheila attended Texas Tech University. Mark's name came from having a Nigerian-born father. His parents met while at boarding school in London. His brothers are named Victor and Vincent and his sister is named Special. In high school, he often stayed with his godmother, Jamie Garza, who lived nearer to the school. The summer before his freshman year in college, his brother, cousin and best friend were fatally shot.
