= 2012 Minnesota Golden Gophers football team =

American college football season

2012 Minnesota Golden Gophers football

Meineke Car Care Bowl of Texas, L 31–34 vs. Texas Tech
- Conference: Big Ten Conference
- Legends Division
- Record: 6–7 (2–6 Big Ten)
- Head coach: Jerry Kill (2nd season)
- Offensive coordinator: Matt Limegrover (2nd season)
- Offensive scheme: Spread
- Defensive coordinator: Tracy Claeys (2nd season)
- Base defense: 4–3
- Captain: Game captains
- Home stadium: TCF Bank Stadium

2012 Big Ten Conference football standings
	Conf.			Overall
Team	W		L	W		L
Legends Division
No. 25 Nebraska xy	7	–	1	10	–	4
No. 24 Michigan	6	–	2	8	–	5
No. 17 Northwestern	5	–	3	10	–	3
Michigan State	3	–	5	7	–	6
Iowa	2	–	6	4	–	8
Minnesota	2	–	6	6	–	7
Leaders Division
No. 3 Ohio State* x	8	–	0	12	–	0
Penn State*	6	–	2	8	–	4
Wisconsin y$	4	–	4	8	–	6
Purdue	3	–	5	6	–	7
Indiana	2	–	6	4	–	8
Illinois	0	–	8	2	–	10
Championship: Wisconsin 70, Nebraska 31
$ – BCS representative as conference champion; x – Division champion/co-champions; * Ohio State and Penn State ineligible for conference championship game and post-season bowl games due to NCAA sanctions.; Rankings from AP Poll

The 2012 Minnesota Golden Gophers football team represented the University of Minnesota in the 2012 NCAA Division I FBS football season. They were led by second-year head coach Jerry Kill and played their home games at TCF Bank Stadium. They were a member of the Legends Division of the Big Ten Conference. They finished the season 6–7, 2–6 in Big Ten play to finish in a tie for fifth place in the Legends Division. They were invited to the Meineke Car Care Bowl of Texas where they were defeated by Texas Tech.

== Schedule ==
Date	Time	Opponent	Site	TV	Result	Attendance
August 30	10:00 pm	at UNLV*	Sam Boyd Stadium; Whitney, Nevada	CBSSN	W 30–27 ^{3OT}	16,013
September 8	11:00 am	No. 12 (FCS) New Hampshire*	TCF Bank Stadium; Minneapolis	BTN	W 44–7	47,022
September 15	11:00 am	Western Michigan*	TCF Bank Stadium; Minneapolis	BTN	W 28–23	44,921
September 22	7:00 pm	Syracuse*	TCF Bank Stadium; Minneapolis	BTN	W 17–10	50,805
September 29	11:00 am	at Iowa	Kinnick Stadium; Iowa City, Iowa (Floyd of Rosedale)	ESPN2	L 13–31	70,585
October 13	11:00 am	Northwestern^{†}	TCF Bank Stadium; Minneapolis	ESPN2	L 13–21	49,651
October 20	11:00 am	at Wisconsin	Camp Randall Stadium; Madison, Wisconsin (Paul Bunyan's Axe)	ESPNU	L 13–38	80,587
October 27	2:30 pm	Purdue	TCF Bank Stadium; Minneapolis	BTN	W 44–28	41,062
November 3	11:00 am	Michigan	TCF Bank Stadium; Minneapolis (Little Brown Jug)	BTN	L 13–35	48,801
November 10	2:30 pm	at Illinois	Memorial Stadium; Champaign, Illinois	BTN	W 17–3	46,912
November 17	2:30 pm	at No. 16 Nebraska	Memorial Stadium; Lincoln, Nebraska	BTN	L 14–38	85,330
November 24	2:30 pm	Michigan State	TCF Bank Stadium; Minneapolis	BTN	L 10–26	44,194
December 28	8:00 pm	vs. Texas Tech*	Reliant Stadium; Houston (Meineke Car Care Bowl of Texas)	ESPN	L 31–34	50,386
*Non-conference game; ^{†}Homecoming; Rankings from Coaches' Poll released prior to the game; All times are in Central time

- Source: Schedule

== Roster ==
The preliminary roster is based on the previous season's roster and eligibility, along with incoming recruits. All numbers are from www.gophersports.com.

2012 Minnesota Golden Gophers football team roster
Players
Coaches
Offense

Pos.	#	Name	Class
WR	1	Brandon Green	Sr
QB	3	Dexter Foreman	Fr
QB	5	MarQueis Gray	Sr
QB	7	Mitch Leidner	Fr
WR	8	Cameron Wilson	So
QB	9	Philip Nelson	Fr
QB	11	Max Shortell	So
WR	12	Andre McDonald	Fr
WR	14	Isaac Fruechte	So
WR	15	Marcus Jones	So
WR	16	Jamel Harbison	Fr
WR	17	C. J. Cesario	So
WR	18	Derrick Engel	Jr
WR	19	Matt Kloss	Sr
RB	20	Donnell Kirkwood	So
RB	21	James Gillum	Jr
RB	25	Devon Wright	So
RB	27	David Cobb	So
TE	28	Moses Alipate	Jr
FB	30	Mike Henry	Jr
RB	31	Cole Banham	So
RB	35	Rodrick Williams	Fr
TE	39	Gabe Mezzenga	So
RB	44	JoJuan Harper	Fr
TE	47	Alex Bisch	So
OL	52	Zac Epping	So
G	53	Tommy Olson	So
OT	58	Ed Olson	Jr
OC	62	Zach Mottla	Jr
OL	63	Jon Christenson	Fr
OL	64	Caleb Bak	So
OL	65	Josh Campion	Fr
OL	66	Luke McAvoy	Fr
OL	68	Issac Hayes	Fr
OL	70	Sean Ferguson	So
OL	71	Kyle McAvoy	Fr
OL	73	Joe Bjorklund	Fr
OL	74	Marek Lenkiewicz	So
OL	75	Ernie Heifort	Fr
OT	76	Jimmy Gjere	So
OL	77	Foster Bush	Fr
OT	78	Ben Lauer	Fr
OT	79	Jonah Pirsig	Fr
WR	80	Devin Crawford-Tufts	So
TE	81	John Rabe	Sr
TE	83	Drew Goodger	So
WR	84	Victor Keise	Jr
WR	86	Malcolm Moulton	Jr
TE	87	Sahr Ngekia	Jr
TE	88	Maxx Williams	Fr
WR	89	Logan Hutton	So
TE	91	Kendall Gregory-McGhee	So

Defense

Pos.	#	Name	Class
LB	1	Brendan Beal	Jr
DB	2	Troy Stoudermire	Sr
DB	3	Martez Shabazz	Jr
LB	4	Keanon Cooper	Sr
DB	6	Michael Carter	Sr
DB	7	Damarius Travis	Fr
LB	8	Spencer Reeves	Sr
DB	11	Antonio Johnson	Fr
DB	13	Derrick Wells	So
DB	16	Steven Montgomery	Fr
LB	17	Nick Rallis	Fr
LB	18	Peter Westerhaus	Fr
DB	19	Cedric Dicke	Fr
DB	21	Brock Vereen	Jr
DB	22	Jeremy Baltazar	Jr
DB	23	Grayson Levine	So
LB	24	James Manuel	Jr
LB	26	Mike Rallis	Sr
DB	27	Cedric Thompson	So
DB	28	Kenny Watkins	Jr
DB	29	Briean Boddy	So
DB	31	Eric Murray	Fr
LB	32	Lamonte Edwards	So
LB	34	Jephte Matilus	Fr
LB	35	Dominic Schultz	Fr
DB	40	Nathan Tow-Arnett	Sr
DL	42	Gavin Bronson	Fr
LB	43	Ryan Grant	Sr
DB	45	Ben Holcomb	Fr
DL	46	Cameron Botticelli	So
LB	47	Quinn Bauducco	Fr
LB	48	Judd Paffrath	Jr
DE	49	Matt Garin	Jr
LB	50	Jack Lynn	Fr
DT	52	Yoshoub Timms	Fr
DE	55	Thieren Cockran	Fr
DL	56	Curran Delaney	Sr
LB	57	Aaron Hill	Jr
LB	59	Joey Balthazor	Jr
DL	62	Eric Jacques	Jr
DL	67	David Stommes	Jr
DL	69	Tyler Hartmann	Fr
DL	90	Austin Hahn	Sr
DE	91	Alex Keith	Fr
DT	92	Roland Johnson	Jr
DE	93	Ben Perry	So
DL	94	Harold Legania	So
DE	95	D.L. Wilhite	Sr
DT	97	Scott Ekpe	Fr
DE	98	Michael Amaefula	So
DT	99	Ra'Shede Hageman	Jr

Special teams

Pos.	#	Name	Class
K	36	Chris Hawthorne	Jr
P	37	Peter Mortell	Fr
K	38	David Schwerman	Sr
K	39	Jordan Wettstein	Sr
LS	40	Jared Hartman	Fr
P	41	Dan Oreske	Jr
LS	48	Jake Filkins	Jr
LS	96	Dave Ramlet	So

Head coach

- Jerry Kill

Coordinators/assistant coaches

- Matt Limegrover (offensive coordinator)
- Tracy Claeys (defensive coordinator)
- Bill Miller (assistant head coach / linebackers)
- Brian Anderson (running backs)
- Jeff Phelps (defensive line)
- Pat Poore (wide receivers)
- Rob Reeves (h-backs / tight ends)
- Jay Sawvel (defensive backs / special teams)
- Jim Zebrowski (quarterbacks)
- Ryan Maiuri (graduate assistant)

Legend

- (C) Team captain
- (S) Suspended
- (I) Ineligible
- Injured
- Redshirt

Roster
Last update: November 19, 2012

== Game summaries ==
=== Syracuse ===
Syracuse at Minnesota

Team	1	2	3	4	Total
Syracuse	3	0	0	7	10
• Minnesota	7	0	7	3	17

- Date: Saturday, September 22
- Location: TCF Bank Stadium, Minneapolis, Minnesota
- Game start: 8:00 p.m. EST
- Television network: Big Ten Network
- Source: ESPN

Scoring summary
1	6:59	MINN	Donnell Kirkwood 2 yard run (Jordan Wettstein kick)	MINN 7-0
1	1:54	SYR	Ross Krautman 33 yard field goal	MINN 7-3
3	10:13	MINN	Donnell Kirkwood 1 yard run (Jordan Wettstein kick)	MINN 14-3
4	3:20	MINN	Jordan Wettstein 43 yard field goal	MINN 17-3
4	0:46	SYR	Marcus Sales 14 yard pass from Ryan Nassib (Ross Krautman kick)	MINN 17-10

Minnesota's best start since 2008
