= Reid Fragel =

American football player (born 1991)

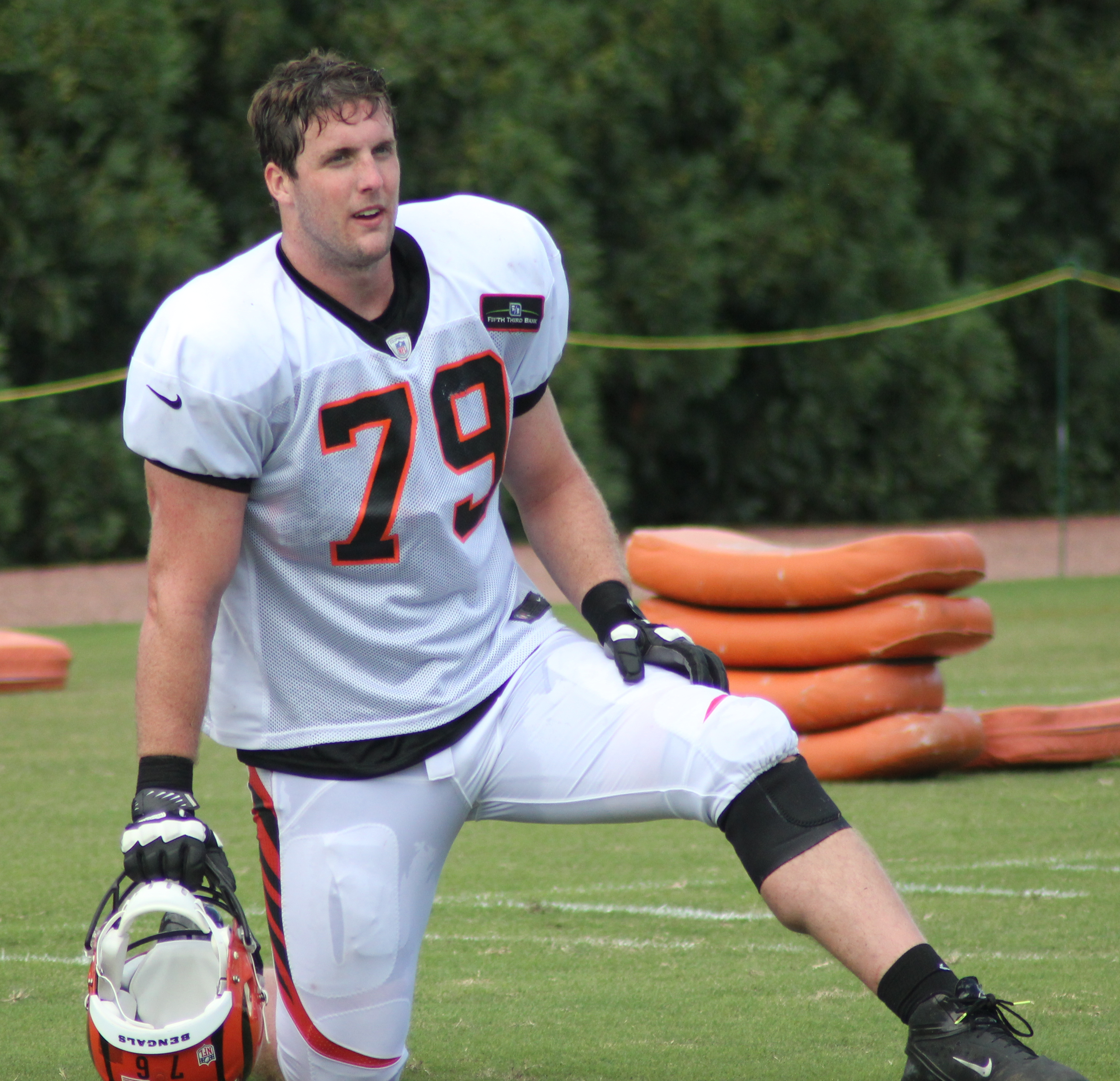
- Fragel with the Cincinnati Bengals in 2013

No. 79
- Position: Offensive tackle

Personal information
- Born: February 22, 1991 (age 35); Grosse Pointe, Michigan, U.S.
- Listed height: 6 ft 8 in (2.03 m)
- Listed weight: 308 lb (140 kg)

Career information
- High school: Grosse Pointe South
- College: Ohio State
- NFL draft: 2013: 7th round, 240th overall pick

Career history
- Cincinnati Bengals (2013)*; Cleveland Browns (2013); Indianapolis Colts (2014)*; Atlanta Falcons (2014–2015)*; Tampa Bay Buccaneers (2015); Kansas City Chiefs (2015–2016)*; Minnesota Vikings (2017)*
- * Offseason or practice squad member only

Career NFL statistics
- Games played: 1
- Stats at Pro Football Reference

Reid Fragel (born February 22, 1991) is an American former professional football player who was an offensive tackle in the National Football League (NFL). He played college football for the Ohio State Buckeyes and was selected by the Cincinnati Bengals in the seventh round of the 2013 NFL draft.

== Professional career ==
Pre-draft measurables
Height	Weight	Arm length	Hand span	40-yard dash	10-yard split	20-yard split	20-yard shuttle	Three-cone drill	Vertical jump	Broad jump	Bench press
6 ft 8 in (2.03 m)	308 lb (140 kg)	33 in (0.84 m)	10 5/8 in (0.27 m)	5.14 s	1.79 s	2.99 s	4.68 s	7.62 s	30 in (0.76 m)	9 ft 5 in (2.87 m)	33 reps
All values from NFL Scouting Combine.

=== Cincinnati Bengals ===
Fragel was selected by the Cincinnati Bengals in the seventh round (240th overall) of the 2013 NFL draft. On August 31, 2013, he was waived by the Bengals. On the following day, he cleared waivers and was signed to the Bengals' practice squad.

=== Cleveland Browns ===
On October 29, 2013, the Cleveland Browns signed Fragel from the Bengals' practice squad. On August 30, 2014, he was waived by the Browns.

=== Atlanta Falcons ===
On September 23, 2014, Fragel was signed to the Atlanta Falcons' practice squad. He was waived by the Falcons on May 1, 2015.

=== Tampa Bay Buccaneers ===
Fragel was claimed off waivers on May 4, 2015. On September 6, 2015, he was released by the Buccaneers. On September 8, 2015, he was signed to the Buccaneers' practice squad. On September 30, 2015, he was promoted to the Buccaneers' active roster. On October 3, 2015, Fragel was waived by the Buccaneers. On October 6, 2015, he was signed to the Buccaneers' practice squad.

=== Kansas City Chiefs ===
On December 2, 2015, the Kansas City Chiefs signed Fragel to the practice squad.

On January 3, 2016, the Chiefs released Fragel from the practice squad. On September 3, 2016, he was released by the Chiefs.

=== Minnesota Vikings ===
On January 3, 2017, Fragel signed a reserve/future contract with the Minnesota Vikings. He was released by the Vikings on September 2, 2017.
