= 2012 Nebraska Cornhuskers football team =

American college football season

2012 Nebraska Cornhuskers football

Big Ten Legends Division champion

Big Ten Championship Game, L 31–70 vs. Wisconsin

Capital One Bowl, L 31–45 vs. Georgia
- Conference: Big Ten Conference
- Legends Division

Ranking
- Coaches: No. 23
- AP: No. 25
- Record: 10–4 (7–1 Big Ten)
- Head coach: Bo Pelini (5th season)
- Offensive coordinator: Tim Beck (2nd season)
- Offensive scheme: Spread
- Defensive coordinator: John Papuchis (1st season)
- Base defense: 4–3
- Home stadium: Memorial Stadium

2012 Big Ten Conference football standings
	Conf.			Overall
Team	W		L	W		L
Legends Division
No. 25 Nebraska xy	7	–	1	10	–	4
No. 24 Michigan	6	–	2	8	–	5
No. 17 Northwestern	5	–	3	10	–	3
Michigan State	3	–	5	7	–	6
Iowa	2	–	6	4	–	8
Minnesota	2	–	6	6	–	7
Leaders Division
No. 3 Ohio State* x	8	–	0	12	–	0
Penn State*	6	–	2	8	–	4
Wisconsin y$	4	–	4	8	–	6
Purdue	3	–	5	6	–	7
Indiana	2	–	6	4	–	8
Illinois	0	–	8	2	–	10
Championship: Wisconsin 70, Nebraska 31
$ – BCS representative as conference champion; x – Division champion/co-champions; * Ohio State and Penn State ineligible for conference championship game and post-season bowl games due to NCAA sanctions.; Rankings from AP Poll

The 2012 Nebraska Cornhuskers football team represented the University of Nebraska in the 2012 NCAA Division I FBS football season. The team was coached by Bo Pelini and played their home games at Memorial Stadium in Lincoln, Nebraska. The Cornhuskers finished with 10–4 overall, 7–1 Legends, to become Big Ten Legends Division champions. In the postseason, the team was invited to the 2012 Big Ten Football Championship Game. It was their fourth division title in the last five years but the first since joining the Big Ten. They lost to Wisconsin (placed in the game due to sanctions on two other schools) and they lost to Georgia in the 2013 Capital One Bowl weeks later.

The Cornhuskers became known for their comebacks this year, as they came back after trailing by double digits during four conference games. These wins included a 30–27 victory over Wisconsin (Nebraska down 27–10 early in 3rd quarter), Northwestern (down 28–16 with 5 minutes to go), Michigan State (down 24–14 early in 4th quarter), and Penn State (down 20–6 at halftime). This is also the most recent season in which the Cornhuskers have won double-digit games.

No spring scrimmage game was played prior to the season, as it was canceled due to weather concerns and player conflicts. It was the first year that Nebraska did not hold a spring scrimmage since they started playing them in 1950.

== Schedule ==
Date	Time	Opponent	Rank	Site	TV	Result	Attendance
September 1	2:30 p.m.	Southern Miss*	No. 17	Memorial Stadium; Lincoln, NE	ABC/ESPN2	W 49–20	85,425
September 8	6:30 p.m.	at UCLA*	No. 16	Rose Bowl; Pasadena, CA	FOX	L 30–36	71,530
September 15	11:00 a.m.	Arkansas State*		Memorial Stadium; Lincoln, NE	ESPN2	W 42–13	85,290
September 22	2:30 p.m.	Idaho State*	No. 25	Memorial Stadium; Lincoln, NE	BTN	W 73–7	84,923
September 29	7:00 p.m.	Wisconsin^{†}	No. 22	Memorial Stadium; Lincoln, NE	ABC	W 30–27	85,962
October 6	7:00 p.m.	at No. 12 Ohio State	No. 21	Ohio Stadium; Columbus, OH	ABC	L 38–63	106,102
October 20	2:30 p.m.	at Northwestern		Ryan Field; Evanston, IL	ABC/ESPN2	W 29–28	47,330
October 27	7:00 p.m.	No. 20 Michigan		Memorial Stadium; Lincoln, NE	ESPN2	W 23–9	86,160
November 3	2:30 p.m.	at Michigan State	No. 21	Spartan Stadium; East Lansing, Michigan	ABC/ESPN2	W 28–24	73,522
November 10	2:30 p.m.	Penn State	No. 18	Memorial Stadium; Lincoln, NE	ABC/ESPN2	W 32–23	85,527
November 17	2:30 p.m.	Minnesota	No. 16	Memorial Stadium; Lincoln, NE	BTN	W 38–14	85,330
November 23	11:00 a.m.	at Iowa	No. 17	Kinnick Stadium; Iowa City, IA (Heroes Game)	ABC	W 13–7	69,805
December 1	7:17 p.m.	vs. Wisconsin	No. 14	Lucas Oil Stadium; Indianapolis, IN (Big Ten Championship Game)	FOX	L 31–70	41,260
January 1, 2013	12:00 p.m.	vs. No. 6 Georgia*	No. 23	Citrus Bowl; Orlando, FL (Capital One Bowl)	ABC	L 31–45	59,712
*Non-conference game; ^{†}Homecoming; Rankings from AP Poll released prior to the game; All times are in Central time

== Roster and coaching staff ==
2012 Nebraska Cornhuskers football team roster
Players
Coaches
Offense

Pos.	#	Name	Class
IB	8	Ameer Abdullah	So
WR	7	Taariq Allen	RFr
QB	4	Tommy Armstrong Jr.	Fr
OL	70	Nick Ash	Jr
WR	80	Kenny Bell	So
TE	83	Jared Blum	Fr
QB	9	Tyson Broekemeier	RFr
IB	22	Rex Burkhead (C)	Sr
WR	46	Sam Burtch	RFr
QB	15	Brion Carnes	So
OL	51	Brandon Chapek	Jr
OL	77	Seung Hoon Choi	Sr
WR	43	Cole Chvatal	Fr
FB	34	Carson Collins	Fr
TE	81	Ben Cotton	Sr
OL	68	Jake Cotton	So
TE	84	Sam Cotton	Fr
OL	67	Scott Criss	Jr
IB	32	Imani Cross	Fr
WR	87	Taylor Dixon	Sr
WR	18	Quincy Enunwa	Jr
WR	88	Tyler Evans	So
WR	27	Sam Foltz	Fr
TE	42	Trey Foster	Fr
IB	23	King Frazier	Fr
QB	17	Ryker Fyfe	Fr
IB/CB	5	Braylon Heard	So
WR	45	Lane Hovey	Fr
WR	85	KC Hyland	Sr
OL	72	Justin Jackson	Sr
FB	35	Andy Janovich	Fr
OL	50	Garret Johns	Fr
QB	12	Ron Kellogg III	Jr
OL	53	Adam Kucera	RFr
IB	24	Murat Kuzu	RFr
OL	75	Chris Long	RFr
TE	41	Jake Long	Jr
OL	61	Spencer Long	Jr
WR	6	Tim Marlowe	Sr
FB	19	Mike Marrow	Jr
QB	14	Bronson Marsh	RFr
QB	3	Taylor Martinez (C)	Jr
TE	89	Conor McDermott	Sr
OL	74	Mike Moudy	So
IB	29	Graham Nabity	Fr
IB	39	Jordan Nelson	Fr
OL	69	Brodrick Nickens	Jr
WR	21	Steven Osborne	Sr
OL	54	Robby Painter	Fr
OL	56	Mark Pelini	So
OL	62	Cole Pensick	Jr
OL	78	Givens Price	RFr
OL	76	Brent Qvale	Jr
TE	25	Kyler Reed	Sr
OL	65	Ryne Reeves	RFr
WR	44	Brandon Reilly	Fr
TE	36	Eddie Ridder	RFr
OL	63	Andrew Rodriguez	Jr
OL	59	Will Sailors	RFr
OL	71	Jeremiah Sirles	Jr
OL	57	Zach Sterup	RFr
FB	38	Graham Stoddard	Sr
TE	86	David Sutton	RFr
OL	79	Brandon Thompson	Sr
OL	55	Paul Thurston	Fr
WR	10	Jamal Turner	So
OL	66	Dylan Utter	Fr
WR	1	Jordan Westerkamp	Fr
OL	58	Corey Whitaker	Fr
QB	16	Evan Williams	Fr
WR	82	Tyler Wullenwaber	So
WR	30	Richard Wynne Jr.	RFr
FB	31	C.J. Zimmerer	Jr

Defense

Pos.	#	Name	Class
LB	33	Jared Afalava	Fr
DB	18	LeRoy Alexander	Fr
DT	70	Kenny Anderson	Sr
LB	8	Zaire Anderson	Jr
DE	9	Jason Ankrah	Jr
DE	47	Walker Ashburn	So
CB	2	Antonio Bell	Sr
S	39	Justin Blatchford	Sr
LB	28	Thomas Brown	Fr
DE	7	Joseph Carter	Sr
LB	51	Will Compton (C)	Sr
S	6	Corey Cooper	So
DT	96	Aaron Curry	Fr
CB	23	Daniel Davie	RFr
CB	31	Jase Dean	Sr
DE	88	Ross Dzuris	Fr
CB	17	Ciante Evans	Jr
CB	25	Joey Felici	So
LB	42	Sean Fisher	Sr
CB	30	Derek Foster	So
LB	38	Aaron Gabriel	Fr
LB	95	Jack Gangwish	RFr
CB	11	Andrew Green	Jr
DT	99	Jay Guy	So
CB	21	Charles Jackson	Fr
S	1	Harvey Jackson	So
CB	29	Seth Jameson	Jr
CB	16	Stanley Jean-Baptiste	Jr
LB	44	Micah Kreikemeier	Sr
LB	49	Matt Manninger	Sr
DE	46	Eric Martin	Sr
LB	54	Mitch McCann	Fr
DE	90	Greg McMullen	Fr
DE	34	Cameron Meredith	Sr
CB	32	Greg Milliken	Fr
CB	5	Josh Mitchell	So
DB	2	Alonzo Moore	Fr
DE	94	Avery Moss	Fr
DT	48	Tobi Okuyemi	So
S	12	Courtney Osborne	Sr
DT	57	Todd Peat Jr.	RFr
LB	40	Max Pirman	RFr
DT	53	Thad Randle	Jr
S	19	Wil Richards	Jr
CB	26	Anthony Ridder	RFr
LB	43	Trevor Roach	So
DT	97	Chase Rome	So
CB	14	Jonathan Rose	So
LB	15	Michael Rose	Fr
LB	41	David Santos	RFr
CB	4	Mohammed Seisay	Jr
LB	56	Brad Simpson	Fr
S	13	P.J. Smith	Sr
S	3	Daimion Stafford	Sr
LB	59	Colby Starkebaum	Jr
DT	55	Baker Steinkuhler (C)	Sr
DT	61	Jeff Uher	So
DT	98	Vincent Valentine	Fr
DE	91	Donovan Vestal	So
CB	26	Yusef Wade	So
LB	45	Alonzo Whaley	Sr
DB	24	Austin Williams	So
DT	92	Kevin Williams	RFr

Special teams

Pos.	#	Name	Class
PK	37	Mauro Bondi	So
PK	91	Colin Clare	Fr
PK	95	Spencer Lindsay	Fr
P, PK	96	Brett Maher (C)	Sr
LS	92	P.J. Mangieri	Sr
LS	97	Joseph Rotherham	RFr

Head coach

- Bo Pelini
  5th season
  6th year at Nebraska
  Alma mater: Ohio State

Coordinators/assistant coaches

- Tim Beck
  2nd season as OC/QB coach
  5th year at Nebraska
  Alma mater: UCF
- John Papuchis
  1st season as DC coach
  5th year at Nebraska
  Alma mater: Virginia Tech
- Ron Brown
  2nd season as RB coach
  22nd year at Nebraska
  Alma mater: Brown
- Barney Cotton
  5th season as AHC/OL coach
  6th year at Nebraska
  Alma mater: Nebraska
- Ross Els
  2nd season as LB coach
  2nd year at Nebraska
  Alma mater: Nebraska-Omaha
- Rich Fisher
  2nd season as WR coach
  2nd year at Nebraska
  Alma mater: Colorado
- John Garrison
  2nd season as OL/TE coach
  2nd year at Nebraska
  Alma mater: Nebraska
- Terry Joseph
  1st season as Sec coach
  1st year at Nebraska
  Alma mater: Northwestern State
- Rick Kaczenski
  1st season as DL coach
  1st year at Nebraska
  Alma mater: Notre Dame
- James Dobson
  5th season as S&C coach
  5th year at Nebraska
  Alma mater: Wisconsin

Legend

- (C) Team captain
- (S) Suspended
- (I) Ineligible
- Injured
- Redshirt

Roster
Last update: September 4, 2012

=== Depth chart ===
Defense

NICKEL
Ciante Evans
Justin Blatchford
⋅

FS
Daimion Stafford
Courtney Osborne
⋅

MIKE	WILL
Will Compton	Sean Fisher; Alonzo Whaley
Trevor Roach	David Santos
⋅	⋅

SS
P.J. Smith
Harvey Jackson
Corey Cooper
⋅

CB
Stanley Jean-Baptiste
Josh Mitchell
Mohamed Seisay
⋅

DE	DT	DT	DE
Cameron Meredith	Baker Steinkuler	Thad Randle	Eric Martin
Joseph Carter	Aaron Curry	Chase Rome	Jason Ankrah
⋅	⋅	⋅	⋅

CB
Andrew Green
Charles Jackson
⋅

Offense

WR
Kenny Bell
Tyler Evans
⋅

WR
Jamal Turner
Tim Marlowe
⋅

LT	LG	C	RG	RT
Brent Qvale	Seung Hoon-Choi	Justin Jackson	Spencer Long	Jeremiah Sirles
Brandon Thompson	Jake Cotton	Cole Pensick	Cole Pensick	Andrew Rodriguez
⋅	⋅	⋅	⋅	⋅

TE
Kyler Reed
Ben Cotton
Jake Long
⋅

WR
Quincy Enunwa
Steven Osborne
⋅

QB
Taylor Martinez
Ron Kellogg
⋅

Key reserves
FB C.J Zimmerer
FB Andy Janovich
FB Mike Marrow

Special teams
PK Brett Maher
P Brett Maher
KR Ameer Abdullah
Kenny Bell
PR Ameer Abdullah
LS \

RB
Rex Burkhead (injured)
Ameer Abdullah
Braylon Heard
Imani Cross

== Game summaries ==
=== Southern Miss ===
Southern Miss Golden Eagles at #17 Nebraska Cornhuskers

Team	1	2	3	4	Total
Southern Miss	7	10	0	3	20
• #17 Nebraska	14	14	14	7	49

- Date: September 1
- Location: Memorial Stadium, Lincoln, NE
- Game start: 2:36 p.m. CST
- Elapsed time: 3:13
- Game attendance: 85,425
- Game weather: Sunny, 88 °F (31 °C), Wind NE 5 mph (8.0 km/h)
- Referee: Ed Ardito
- TV announcers (ABC/ESPN2): Mike Patrick, Ed Cunningham, Jeannine Edwards

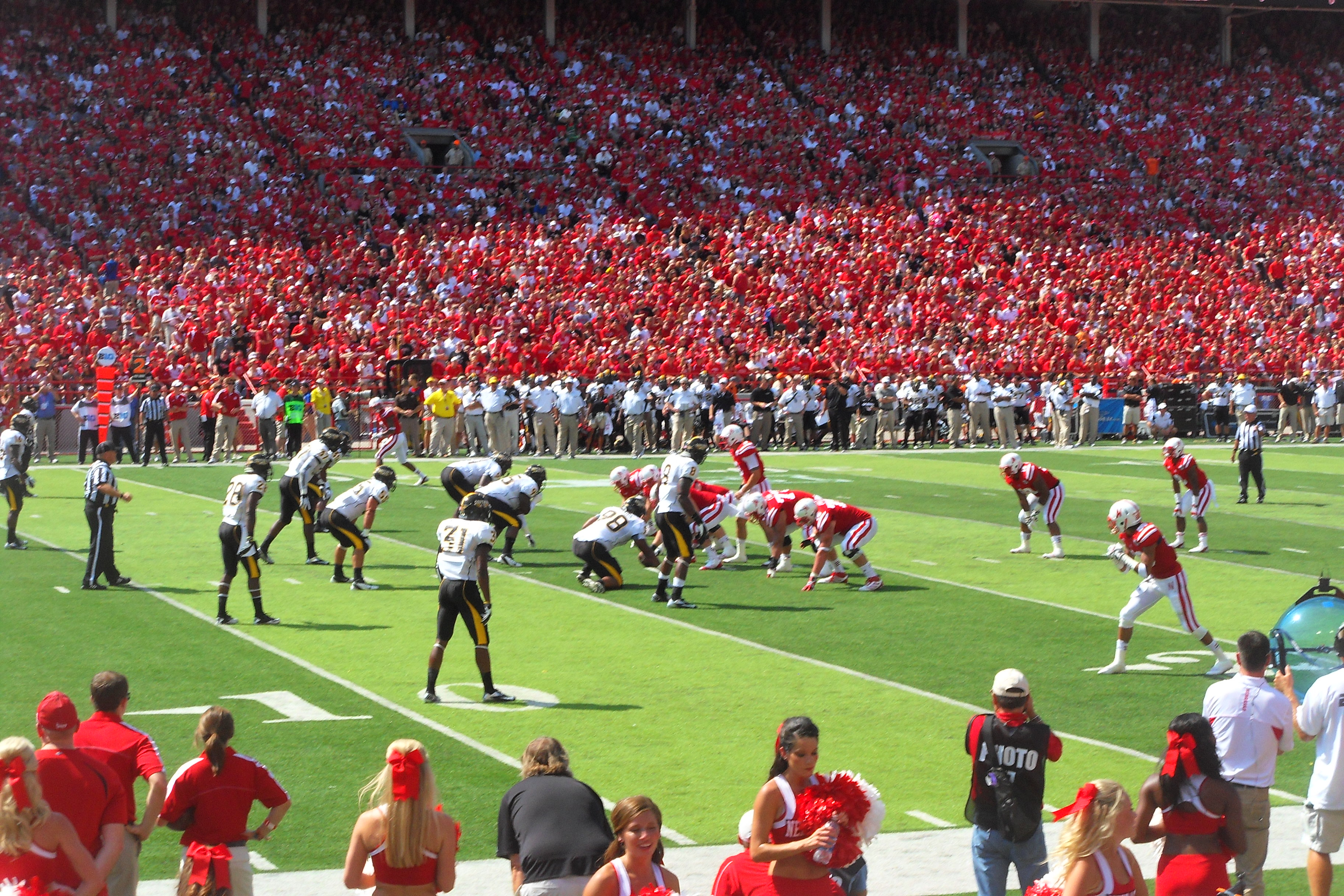

The Huskers started the 2012 football season off with a home win against Southern Miss. The Huskers are now 3–1 against the Golden Eagles with the only loss being from the last time these teams faced each other in 2004. This game started a three game home-away-home series with additional meetings in 2013 and 2015. The 2013 meeting was scheduled to be played at Southern Miss, but the game was moved to Lincoln as an attempt to earn more money. Southern Miss also thought about scheduling the game in New Orleans or Kansas City before deciding to give Nebraska an eighth home game in 2013.

Scoring summary

Quarter	Time	Drive			Team	Scoring information	Score	
Quarter	Time	Plays	Yards	TOP	Team	Scoring information	USM	Nebraska
1	14:54	4	69	1:18	Nebraska	Rex Burkhead rush over left end for 57 yards; Brett Maher kick	0	7
1	10:13	10	85	3:19	Nebraska	Taylor Martinez pass complete to Kenny Bell for 26 yards; Maher kick	0	14
1	6:54	1	100	0:19	USM	Tracy Lampley kickoff return for 100 yards; Corey Acosta kick	7	14
2	6:48	11	73	4:52	USM	Chris Campbell pass complete to Sullivan for 24 yards; Acosta kick	14	14
2	12:58	11	59	3:42	Nebraska	Martinez pass complete to Jake Long for 9 yards; Maher kick	14	21
2	4:54	11	49	3:17	USM	Acosta 45-yard field goal	17	21
2	1:37	5	77	0:39	Nebraska	Martinez pass complete to Steven Osborne for 29 yards; Maher kick	17	28
3	10:11	7	77	2:35	Nebraska	Martinez pass complete to Kyler Reed for 18 yards; Maher kick	17	35
3	5:18	6	63	2:34	Nebraska	Braylon Heard rush up middle for 10 yards; Maher kick	17	42
4	2:44	10	55	4:41	USM	Acosta 37-yard field goal	20	42
4	13:03	10	75	5:16	Nebraska	Martinez pass complete to Ameer Abdullah for 11 yards; Maher kick	20	49
"TOP" = time of possession. For other American football terms, see Glossary of American football.							20	49

=== UCLA ===
#16 Nebraska Cornhuskers at UCLA Bruins

Team	1	2	3	4	Total
#16 Nebraska	14	10	3	3	30
• UCLA	7	17	3	9	36

- Date: September 8
- Location: Rose Bowl, Pasadena, California
- Game start: 4:50 PST
- Elapsed time: 3:40
- Game attendance: 71,530
- Game weather: Light Haze, 90 °F (32 °C), Wind WSW 8 mph (13 km/h)
- Referee: Dan Capron
- TV announcers (FOX): Gus Johnson, Charles Davis, Julie Alexandria

The Huskers went on the road for the first time in their second game of the season to face UCLA in Pasadena, California. The two teams have faced each other previously ten times, with the Huskers having six wins to UCLA’s four coming into the game. The last time these teams faced each other was in Lincoln in 1994 where the Huskers defeated UCLA 49–21. This game started a home and home series that will be concluded during the 2013 season. With this win UCLA is 4–2 at home against the Cornhuskers.

Scoring summary

Quarter	Time	Drive			Team	Scoring information	Score	
Quarter	Time	Plays	Yards	TOP	Team	Scoring information	Nebraska	UCLA
1	9:14	1	27	0:06	UCLA	Joseph Fauria 27-yard pass from Brett Hundley (K. Fairbairn kick)	0	7
1	9:08	6	75	2:08	Nebraska	Ameer Abdullah 6-yard run (Brett Maher kick)	7	7
1	3:08	2	96	0:44	Nebraska	T. Martinez 92-yard run (Maher kick)	14	7
2	2:24	12	58	4:59	UCLA	Fairbairn 35-yard field goal	14	10
2	10:48	6	58	2:53	UCLA	Joseph Fauria 4-yard pass from Hundley (Fairbairn kick)	14	17
2	7:55	7	87	2:54	Nebraska	Abdullah 17-yard run (Maher kick)	21	17
2	5:01	4	80	1:12	UCLA	Steven Manfro 49-yard pass from Hundley (Fairbairn kick)	21	24
2	0:40	5	25	0:40	Nebraska	Maher 54-yard field goal	24	24
3	14:56	9	24	3:06	UCLA	Fairbairn 22-yard field goal	24	27
3	10:18	9	36	2:40	Nebraska	Maher 43-yard field goal	27	27
4	8:51	1	-5	0:13	UCLA	Martinez rush for −5 yards; Datone Jones safety	27	29
4	3:07	3	16	1:03	UCLA	Johnathan Franklin 9-yard pass from Hundley (Fairbairn kick)	27	36
4	2:04	5	13	0:28	Nebraska	Maher 40-yard field goal	30	36
"TOP" = time of possession. For other American football terms, see Glossary of American football.							30	36

=== Arkansas State ===
Arkansas State Red Wolves at Nebraska Cornhuskers

Team	1	2	3	4	Total
Arkansas State	0	3	10	0	13
• Nebraska	14	14	0	14	42

- Date: September 15
- Location: Memorial Stadium, Lincoln, NE
- Game start: 11:01 a.m. CST
- Elapsed time: 3:13
- Game attendance: 85,920
- Game weather: Sunny, 67 °F (19 °C), Wind S 5 mph (8.0 km/h)
- Referee: Mike Cannon
- TV announcers (ESPN2): Beth Mowins, Joey Galloway, Lewis Johnson

The third game of the season brought the Huskers home to Lincoln to face Arkansas State, led by head coach Gus Malzahn, for the second time in history. The Huskers defeated the Red Wolves in 2009 with a score of 38–9. During the first half of the game Pelini began feeling ill. At halftime he was sent to a local hospital for a series of precautionary tests that ultimately revealed no major health concerns. Defensive coordinator John Papuchis took over head coaching duties in the second half in Pelini's absence.

Scoring summary

Quarter	Time	Drive			Team	Scoring information	Score	
Quarter	Time	Plays	Yards	TOP	Team	Scoring information	ASU	Nebraska
1	12:47	9	51	2:58	Nebraska	Ameer Abdullah rush up middle for 1 yard; Brett Maher kick	0	7
1	2:36	5	67	2:12	Nebraska	Taylor Martinez pass complete to Kenny Bell for 42 yards; Maher kick	0	14
2	0:24	9	59	2:31	ASU	Brian Davis 31-yard field goal	3	14
2	12:53	6	72	3:24	Nebraska	Martinez pass complete to Bell for 25 yards; Maher kick	3	21
2	5:35	10	75	5:00	Nebraska	Abdullah rush over left tackle for 2 yards; Maher kick	3	28
3	10:44	2	-11	0:43	ASU	Martinez sacked for loss of 14 yards to the Nebraska 1 by Shervarius Jackson, fumble by Martinez, recovered by Jackson, Qushaun Lee for 1-yard touchdown; Davis kick	10	28
3	5:12	4	0	1:00	ASU	Davis 32-yard field goal	13	28
4	4:12	12	57	6:22	Nebraska	Imani Cross rush up middle for 2 yards; Maher kick	13	35
4	10:29	4	43	1:28	Nebraska	Martinez rush over right end for 18 yards; Maher kick	13	42
"TOP" = time of possession. For other American football terms, see Glossary of American football.							13	42

=== Idaho State ===
Idaho State Bengals at #25 Nebraska Corhuskers

Team	1	2	3	4	Total
Idaho State	0	0	0	7	7
• #25 Nebraska	35	10	21	7	73

- Date: September 22
- Location: Memorial Stadium, Lincoln, NE
- Game start: 2:42 p.m. CST
- Elapsed time: 3:17
- Game attendance: 84,923
- Game weather: Sunny, 59 °F (15 °C), Wind NE 8 mph (13 km/h)
- Referee: Dave Witvoet
- TV announcers (BTN): Tom Werme, Kelly Stouffer, Damon Benning

The fourth and final game before conference play paired the Huskers against Idaho St. for their first meeting in history. The Bengals are from the Big Sky Conference.

=== Wisconsin ===
Wisconsin Badgers at Nebraska Cornhuskers

Team	1	2	3	4	Total
Wisconsin	14	6	7	0	27
• #22 Nebraska	3	7	17	3	30

- Date: September 29
- Location: Memorial Stadium, Lincoln, NE
- Game start: 7:12 p.m. CST
- Elapsed time: 3:28
- Game attendance: 85,962
- Game weather: Clear, 73 °F (23 °C), Wind SSE 0–9 mph (0–14 km/h)
- Referee: Bill LeMonnier
- TV announcers (ABC): Brad Nessler, Todd Blackledge, Holly Rowe

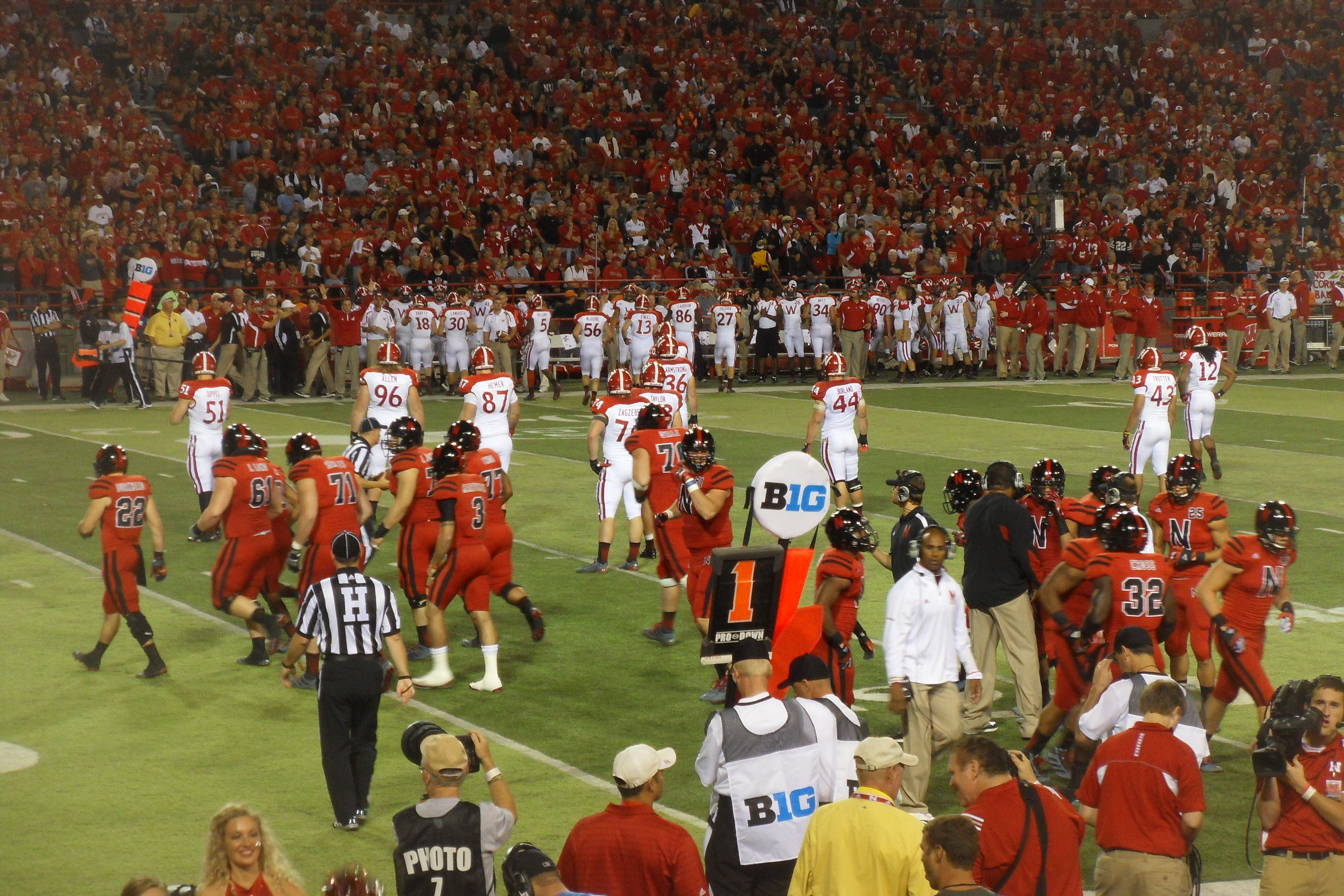

Nebraska began its second season of Big Ten conference play with a home game against Wisconsin, the team that defeated them 48–17 in their first Big Ten conference game in 2011. The all-time series coming into the game was tied 3–3 with Nebraska having last hosted Wisconsin in 1973. This game also was marked as "The Quick and The Red" as both schools went against tradition and wore alternate uniforms created by Adidas. Nebraska wore a black helmet, normally white, an all red uniform with black stripes on both shoulders and down the side of the leg, and a black "N" on the front instead of the number. Wisconsin wore a red helmet, normally white, with a traditional "W" on it, all white uniform, shoulders covered in red, red stripes down side of legs with a red "W" where the numbers normally are.

=== Ohio State ===
No. 21 Nebraska Cornhuskers at No. 12 Ohio State Buckeyes

Team	1	2	3	4	Total
No. 21 Nebraska	14	10	7	7	38
• No. 12 Ohio State	7	28	14	14	63

- Date: October 6
- Location: Ohio Stadium, Columbus, Ohio
- Game start: 7:13 p.m. CST
- Elapsed time: 3:33
- Game attendance: 106,102
- Game weather: Partly cloudy, 52 °F (11 °C), wind NW at 9 mph (14 km/h)
- Referee: Todd Geerlings
- TV announcers (ABC): Brad Nessler, Todd Blackledge, Holly Rowe

The Huskers traveled to Columbus to face Ohio State, who were playing their first season under new head coach Urban Meyer. In 2011, Nebraska defeated the Buckeyes, 34–27, on the strength of a historic second-half comeback after being down 27–6. This game marked the Huskers' first visit to Columbus since 1956. There would be no comeback in this one, as the Buckeyes, after trailing 14–7 after the first quarter, pulled away by halftime to win 63–38.

=== Northwestern ===
Nebraska Cornhuskers at Northwestern Wildcats

Team	1	2	3	4	Total
• Nebraska	3	7	6	13	29
Northwestern	7	7	7	7	28

- Date: October 20
- Location: Ryan Field (stadium), Evanston, Illinois
- Game start: 2:35 p.m. CST
- Elapsed time: 3:39
- Game attendance: 47,330
- Game weather: Partly cloudy, 57 °F (14 °C), Wind NW 9 mph (14 km/h)
- Referee: Dennis Lipski
- TV announcers (ABC/ESPN2): Bob Wischusen, Danny Kanell, Maria Taylor

Nebraska came into the game leading the all time series 3 wins to 2 losses. This game was the Huskers first game in Evanston since 1931.

=== Michigan ===
#20 Michigan Wolverines at Nebraska Cornhuskers

Team	1	2	3	4	Total
#20 Michigan	0	6	3	0	9
• Nebraska	0	7	9	7	23

- Date: October 27
- Location: Memorial Stadium, Lincoln, NE
- Game start: 7:01 p.m. CST
- Elapsed time: 3:15
- Game attendance: 86,160
- Game weather: Cloudy, 41 °F (5 °C), Wind SW 13 mph (21 km/h)
- Referee: Dan Capron
- TV announcers (ESPN2): Mark Jones, Brock Huard, Jessica Mendoza

Michigan came into the game leading the all time series at 4–2–1. This was the Wolverine's first trip to Lincoln since a 6–6 tie in 1911.

=== Michigan State ===
#21 Nebraska Cornhuskers at Michigan State Spartans

Team	1	2	3	4	Total
• #21 Nebraska	7	7	0	14	28
Michigan State	7	7	3	7	24

- Date: November 3
- Location: Spartan Stadium, East Lansing, Michigan
- Game start: 3:30 p.m. EST
- Elapsed time: 3:52
- Game attendance: 73,522
- Game weather: Cloudy, 38 °F (3 °C), Wind NW 6 mph (9.7 km/h)
- Referee: Bill LeMonnier
- TV announcers (ABC/ESPN2): Sean McDonough, Chris Spielman, Quint Kessenich

Nebraska came into the game having never lost to the Spartans, leading the all time series 6–0. This was the Huskers first visit to East Lansing since spoiling Nick Saban's first game, a 50–10 Nebraska win in 1995.

=== Penn State ===
Penn State Nittany Lions at #18 Nebraska Cornhuskers

Team	1	2	3	4	Total
Penn State	7	13	3	0	23
• #18 Nebraska	3	3	14	12	32

- Date: November 10
- Location: Memorial Stadium, Lincoln, NE
- Game start: 2:35 p.m. CST
- Elapsed time: 3:33
- Game attendance: 85,527
- Game weather: Sunny, 76 °F (24 °C), Wind S 11–35 mph (18–56 km/h)
- Referee: John O'Neill
- TV announcers (ABC/ESPN2): Sean McDonough, Chris Spielman, Quint Kessenich

This was Penn State's first trip to Lincoln since 2003 where the all time series between the two coming into the game was 7–6, with Nebraska having the advantage.

=== Minnesota ===
Minnesota Golden Gophers at #16 Nebraska Cornhuskers

Team	1	2	3	4	Total
Minnesota	0	0	0	14	14
• #16 Nebraska	10	14	14	0	38

- Date: November 17
- Location: Memorial Stadium, Lincoln, NE
- Game start: 2:43 p.m. CST
- Elapsed time: 3:14
- Game attendance: 85,330
- Game weather: Sunny, 62 °F (17 °C), Wind S 14–28 mph (23–45 km/h)
- Referee: Alex Camp
- TV announcers (BTN): Eric Collins, Derek Rackley

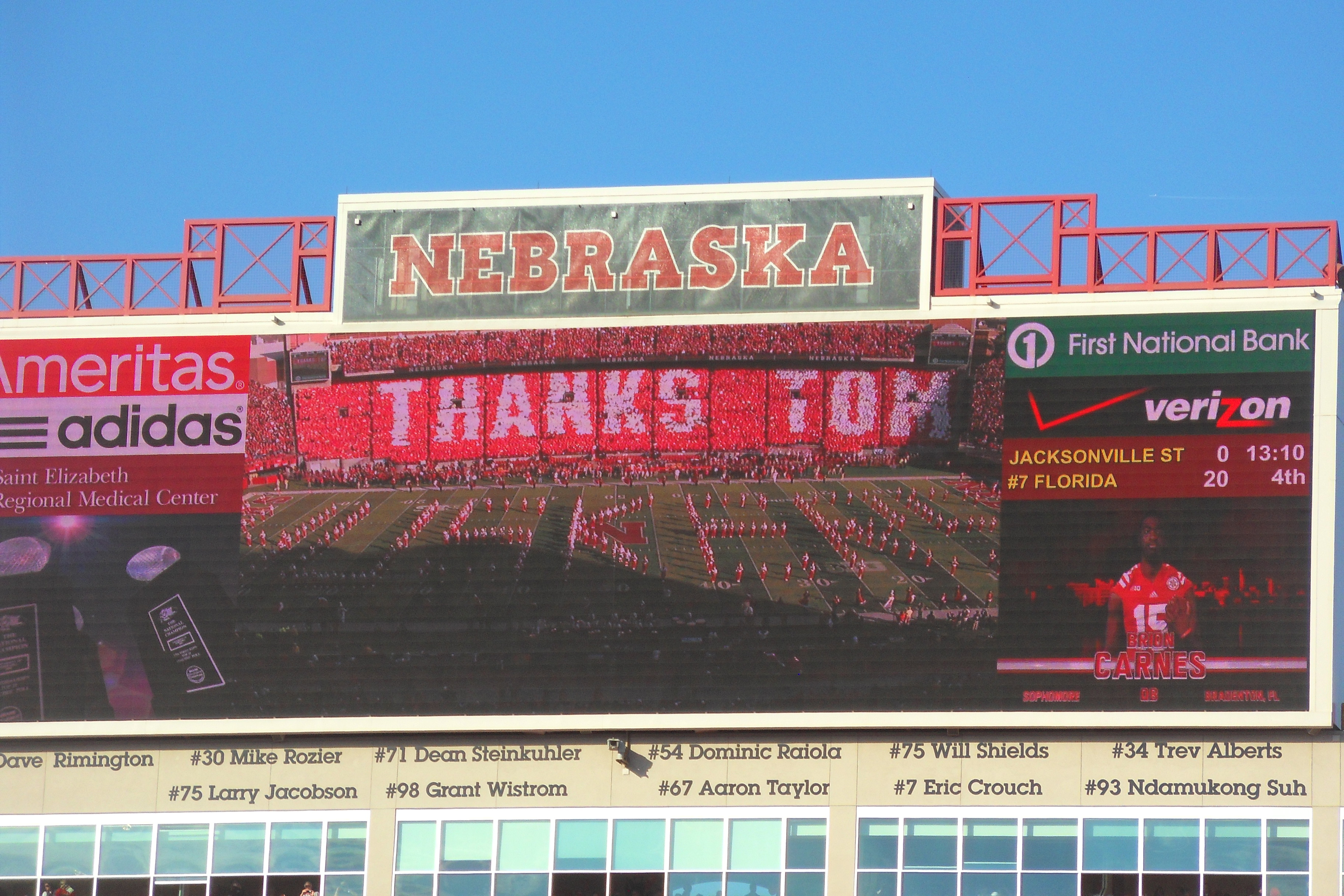
Celebrating Tom Osborne during pre-game

The Golden Gophers lead the all time series 29–21–2, but have not won a game in Lincoln since 1960. The last Minnesota team to play at Nebraska was the victim of a 56–0 loss in 1990. The win ensured Nebraska's first unbeaten home season since 2001.

=== Iowa ===
#17 Nebraska Cornhuskers at Iowa Hawkeyes

Team	1	2	3	4	Total
• #17 Nebraska	3	0	10	0	13
Iowa	7	0	0	0	7

- Date: November 23
- Location: Kinnick Stadium, Iowa City, Iowa
- Game start: 11:07 a.m. CST
- Elapsed time: 3:05
- Game attendance: 69,805
- Game weather: Mostly Sunny, 31 °F (−1 °C), Wind NW 26 mph (42 km/h)
- Referee: Dan Capron
- TV announcers (ABC): Mike Patrick, Ed Cunningham, Jeannine Edwards

Nebraska leads the all-time series 27–12–3. The last Husker team to visit Iowa City opened the 1999 season with a 42–7 victory.

=== Wisconsin (Big Ten Championship Game) ===
#14 Nebraska Cornhuskers vs. Wisconsin Badgers

Team	1	2	3	4	Total
#14 Nebraska	10	0	7	14	31
• Wisconsin	21	21	21	7	70

- Date: December 1
- Location: Lucas Oil Stadium, Indianapolis, IN
- Game start: 8:20 p.m. EST
- Elapsed time: 3:28
- Game attendance: 41,260
- Game weather: Indoors
- Referee: John O'Neill
- TV announcers (FOX): Gus Johnson, Charles Davis, Julie Alexandria, Petros Papadakis

This game marked Nebraska's only appearance in the Big Ten Championship game. Nebraska's last appearance in a conference championship game was in 2010 their last season in the Big XII conference. Nebraska defeated Wisconsin 30–27 in the regular season. Wisconsin won the game and received the conference berth in the 2013 Rose Bowl.

=== Capital One Bowl ===
#23 Nebraska Cornhuskers vs. #6 Georgia Bulldogs

Team	1	2	3	4	Total
• #6 Georgia	16	7	8	14	45
#23 Nebraska	14	10	7	0	31

- Date: January 1
- Location: Florida Citrus Bowl Stadium, Orlando, Fl
- Game start: 1:08 p.m. EST
- Elapsed time: 3:33
- Game attendance: 59,712
- Game weather: Partly Cloudy, 75 °F (24 °C), Wind SSW 11 mph (18 km/h)
- Referee: Mike Defee
- TV announcers (ABC): Rece Davis, Jesse Palmer, David Pollack, Samantha Steele

== Rankings ==
Ranking movements Legend: ██ Increase in ranking ██ Decrease in ranking — = Not ranked RV = Received votes
	Week															
Poll	Pre	1	2	3	4	5	6	7	8	9	10	11	12	13	14	Final
AP	17	16	RV	25	22	21	RV	RV	RV	21	18	16	17	14	23	25
Coaches	16	14	24	22	20	20	RV	RV	RV	21	16	14	14	13	21	23
Harris	Not released						RV	RV	RV	21	16	14	14	13	18	Not released
BCS	Not released							—	—	20	16	14	14	12	16	Not released
