= Brian Arnfelt =

American lawyer and football player (born 1989)

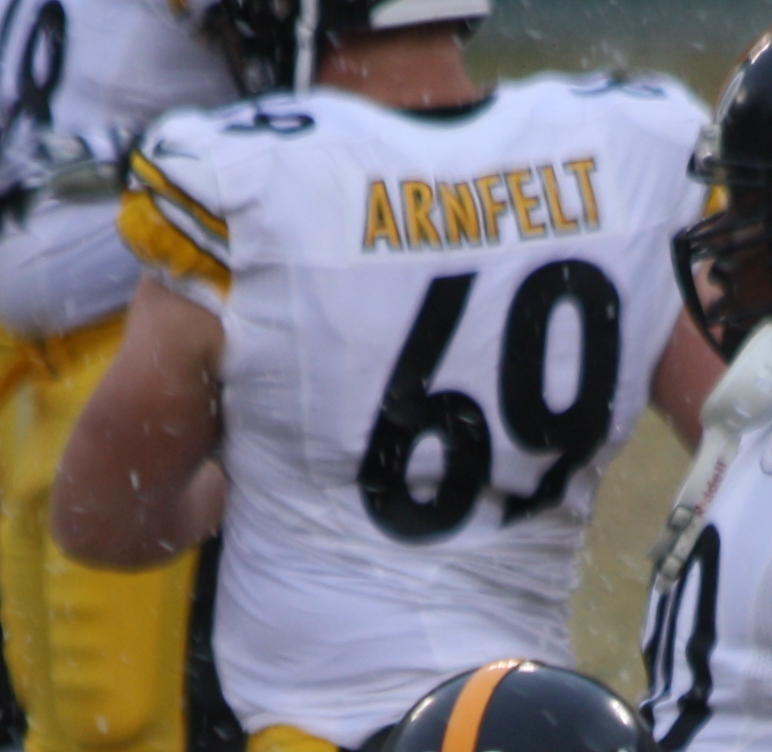

No. 69, 91
- Position: Defensive end

Personal information
- Born: October 11, 1989 (age 37); Lake Elmo, Minnesota, U.S.
- Listed height: 6 ft 4 in (1.93 m)
- Listed weight: 298 lb (135 kg)

Career information
- High school: Stillwater Area (Oak Park Heights, Minnesota)
- College: Northwestern
- NFL draft: 2013: undrafted

Career history
- Pittsburgh Steelers (2013)

Career NFL statistics
- Games played: 2
- Games started: 0
- Stats at Pro Football Reference

Brian Dale Arnfelt (born October 11, 1989) is an American attorney, investment banker and former professional football player who played for Northwestern University and the Pittsburgh Steelers of the National Football League (NFL).

== Early life and college ==
Arnfelt attended Stillwater Area High School in Stillwater, Minnesota, where he was a member of the National Honor Society and captain of the varsity football and track and field teams.

Arnfelt attended Northwestern University in Evanston, Illinois, where he was a member of the varsity football team and played defensive line for the Northwestern Wildcats. His senior year, Arnfelt was an Academic All-American selection and team captain. In 2012–2013, Arnfelt led the Wildcats to their first bowl victory since 1948 and a 10–3 record, finishing 17th in the AP Poll and 16th in the Coaches Poll.

== Professional career ==
Pre-draft measurables
Height	Weight	Arm length	Hand span	40-yard dash	10-yard split	20-yard split	20-yard shuttle	Three-cone drill	Vertical jump	Broad jump	Bench press
6 ft 4 7/8 in (1.95 m)	302 lb (137 kg)	32 1/8 in (0.82 m)	9 3/4 in (0.25 m)	4.81 s	1.68 s	2.77 s	4.43 s	7.77 s	31.0 in (0.79 m)	9 ft 1 in (2.77 m)	38 reps
All values from Northwestern's Pro Day

Arnfelt impressed scouts at Northwestern's pro day on March 5, 2013. He ran a 4.81 second 40-yard dash and bench pressed 225 lbs for 38 reps.

Following the 2013 NFL draft on April 27, 2013, Arnfelt signed a free agent contract with the Pittsburgh Steelers. After spending time on the Steelers practice squad in 2013, Arnfelt was promoted to the active roster on December 14, 2013.

== Personal life ==
Following his football career, Arnfelt enrolled in the University of Michigan Law School. At Michigan, Arnfelt served as an Editor on the Michigan Business & Entrepreneurial Law Review, was awarded a certificate of merit in investment banking and graduated with honors. In 2024, Arnfelt was named a partner at internationally renowned Kirkland & Ellis LLP in its mergers & acquisitions group. He currently works at Neal & Leroy.
