= 2012 Wisconsin Badgers football team =

American college football season

2012 Wisconsin Badgers football

Big Ten champion

Big Ten Championship Game, W 70–31 vs. Nebraska

Rose Bowl, L 14–20 vs. Stanford
- Conference: Big Ten Conference
- Leaders Division
- Record: 8–6 (4–4 Big Ten)
- Head coach: Bret Bielema (7th season; first 13 games); Barry Alvarez (interim; bowl game)
- Offensive coordinator: Matt Canada (1st season)
- Offensive scheme: Pro-style
- Defensive coordinator: Chris Ash (2nd season)
- Co-defensive coordinator: Charlie Partridge (2nd season)
- Base defense: 4–3
- MVPs: Jared Abbrederis; Montee Ball; Chris Borland; Mike Taylor
- Captains: Montee Ball; Chris Borland; Travis Frederick; Shelton Johnson; Mike Taylor; Ricky Wagner
- Home stadium: Camp Randall Stadium

2012 Big Ten Conference football standings
	Conf.			Overall
Team	W		L	W		L
Legends Division
No. 25 Nebraska xy	7	–	1	10	–	4
No. 24 Michigan	6	–	2	8	–	5
No. 17 Northwestern	5	–	3	10	–	3
Michigan State	3	–	5	7	–	6
Iowa	2	–	6	4	–	8
Minnesota	2	–	6	6	–	7
Leaders Division
No. 3 Ohio State* x	8	–	0	12	–	0
Penn State*	6	–	2	8	–	4
Wisconsin y$	4	–	4	8	–	6
Purdue	3	–	5	6	–	7
Indiana	2	–	6	4	–	8
Illinois	0	–	8	2	–	10
Championship: Wisconsin 70, Nebraska 31
$ – BCS representative as conference champion; x – Division champion/co-champions; * Ohio State and Penn State ineligible for conference championship game and post-season bowl games due to NCAA sanctions.; Rankings from AP Poll

The 2012 Wisconsin Badgers football team was an American football team that represented the University of Wisconsin–Madison as a member of the Leaders Division of the Big Ten Conference during the 2012 NCAA Division I FBS football season. In their seventh and final year under head coach Bret Bielema, the Badgers compiled an 8–6 record (4–4 in conference games), won the Big Ten championship, and outscored opponents by a total of 414 to 268. Despite finishing third in the Leaders Division, the Badgers advanced to the Big Ten Championship Game, because the first- and second-place teams (Ohio State and Penn State) were ineligible for postseason play. The Badgers defeated Nebraska in the Big Ten Championship Game and advanced to the Rose Bowl, losing to Stanford. On December 4, Bielema accepted the vacant coaching position at Arkansas. Athletic director and former head coach Barry Alvarez took over as head coach for the Rose Bowl.

Montee Ball led the team with 1,830 yards and 132 points scored, and won the Doak Walker Award as the best running back in college football. He also became the first player to score a touchdown in three straight Rose Bowl Games. Ball and offensive linemen Travis Frederick and Ricky Wagner received All-America honors. Linebacker Mike Taylor led the team with 69 solo tackles, 123 total tackles, and 15 tackles for loss.

The team played its home games at Camp Randall Stadium in Madison, Wisconsin.

== Schedule ==
Date	Time	Opponent	Rank	Site	TV	Result	Attendance
September 1	2:30 p.m.	No. 9 (FCS) Northern Iowa*	No. 12	Camp Randall Stadium; Madison, WI	BTN	W 26–21	79,568
September 8	3:00 p.m.	at Oregon State*	No. 13	Reser Stadium; Corvallis, OR	Fox	L 7–10	42,189
September 15	7:00 p.m.	Utah State*		Camp Randall Stadium; Madison, WI	BTN	W 16–14	79,332
September 22	11:00 a.m.	UTEP*		Camp Randall Stadium; Madison, WI	ESPN2	W 37–26	79,806
September 29	7:00 p.m.	at No. 22 Nebraska		Memorial Stadium; Lincoln, NE (rivalry)	ABC	L 27–30	85,962
October 6	2:30 p.m.	Illinois		Camp Randall Stadium; Madison, WI	ABC/ESPN2	W 31–14	80,096
October 13	11:00 a.m.	at Purdue		Ross–Ade Stadium; West Lafayette, IN	BTN	W 38–14	46,007
October 20	11:00 a.m.	Minnesota		Camp Randall Stadium; Madison, WI (rivalry)	ESPNU	W 38–13	80,587
October 27	2:30 p.m.	Michigan State^{†}	No. 25	Camp Randall Stadium; Madison, WI	ABC/ESPN2	L 13–16 ^{OT}	80,538
November 10	11:00 a.m.	at Indiana		Memorial Stadium; Bloomington, IN	ESPN2	W 62–14	43,240
November 17	2:30 p.m.	No. 6 Ohio State		Camp Randall Stadium; Madison, WI	ABC/ESPN2	L 14–21 ^{OT}	80,112
November 24	2:30 p.m.	at Penn State		Beaver Stadium; University Park, PA	ESPN2	L 21–24 ^{OT}	93,505
December 1	7:00 p.m.	vs. No. 14 Nebraska		Lucas Oil Stadium; Indianapolis, IN (Big Ten Championship Game)	Fox	W 70–31	41,260
January 1, 2013	4:10 p.m.	vs. No. 8 Stanford*		Rose Bowl; Pasadena, CA (Rose Bowl, College GameDay)	ESPN	L 14–20	93,259
*Non-conference game; ^{†}Homecoming; Rankings from AP Poll released prior to the game; All times are in Central time; Source:

== Rankings ==
Ranking movements Legend: ██ Increase in ranking ██ Decrease in ranking — = Not ranked RV = Received votes
	Week															
Poll	Pre	1	2	3	4	5	6	7	8	9	10	11	12	13	14	Final
AP	12	13	RV	RV	RV	—	—	RV	RV	RV	—	RV	RV	—	RV	RV
Coaches	12	13	22	24	23	RV	RV	RV	25	RV	RV	RV	RV	—	23	RV
Harris	Not released						RV	RV	RV	RV	RV	RV	RV	—	RV	Not released
BCS	Not released							—	25	—	—	—	—	—	—	Not released

== Game summaries ==
=== No. 9 (FCS) Northern Iowa ===
No. 9 (FCS) Northern Iowa Panthers at No. 12 Wisconsin Badgers – Game summary

Quarter	1	2	3	4	Total
No. 9 (FCS) Panthers	0	0	7	14	21
No. 12 Badgers	3	10	6	7	26

at Camp Randall Stadium, Madison, Wisconsin

- Date: September 1
- Game time: 2:30 p.m. CDT
- Game weather: Partly cloudy, 75 °F (24 °C)
- Game attendance: 79,568
- Referee: Dennis Lispski
- TV announcers (BTN): Kevin Kugler, Chris Martin, and Jay Wilson
- Box score, Recap

Game information
First quarter
- WIS – Kyle French 32-yard field goal, 7:19. Badgers 3–0. Drive: 14 plays, 61 yards, 7:41.

Second quarter

- WIS – Kyle French 35-yard field goal, 7:37. Badgers 6–0. Drive: 13 plays, 66 yards, 6:28.
- WIS – Jared Abbrederis 10-yard pass from Danny O'Brien (Kyle French kick), 0:50. Badgers 13–0. Drive: 10 plays, 53 yards, 5:28.

Third quarter

- WIS – Montee Ball 1-yard run (kick blocked), 10:22. Badgers 19–0. Drive: 8 plays, 60 yards, 3:39.
- UNI – Chad Owens 2-yard pass from Sawyer Kollmorgen (Tyler Sievertsen kick), 0:52. Badgers 19–7. Drive: 13 plays, 75 yards, 6:02.

Fourth quarter

- WIS – Jared Abbrederis 53-yard pass from Danny O'Brien (Kyle French kick), 12:31. Badgers 26–7. Drive: 7 plays, 79 yards, 3:16.
- UNI – David Johnson 55-yard pass from Sawyer Kollmorgen (Tyler Sievertsen kick), 11:11. Badgers 26–14. Drive: 4 plays, 74 yards, 1:13.
- UNI – David Johnson 31-yard pass from Sawyer Kollmorgen (Tyler Sievertsen kick), 7:24. Badgers 26–21. Drive: 7 plays, 62 yards, 1:52.

Statistics	UNI	WIS
First downs	14	22
Total yards	306	387
Rushing yards	41	168
Passing yards	265	219
Turnovers	0	0
Time of possession	20:55	39:05

Team	Category	Player	Statistics
Northern Iowa	Passing	Sawyer Kollmorgen	18/34, 265 yards, 3 TD
Northern Iowa	Rushing	David Johnson	8 rushes, 18 yards
Northern Iowa	Receiving	David Johnson	4 receptions, 107 yards, 2 TD
Wisconsin	Passing	Danny O'Brien	19/23, 219 yards, 2 TD
Wisconsin	Rushing	Montee Ball	32 rushes, 120 yards, TD
Wisconsin	Receiving	Jared Abbrederis	6 receptions, 84 yards, 2 TD

=== At Oregon State ===
No. 13 Wisconsin Badgers at Oregon State Beavers – Game summary

Quarter	1	2	3	4	Total
No. 13 Badgers	0	0	0	7	7
Beavers	0	3	7	0	10

at Reser Stadium, Corvallis, Oregon

- Date: September 8
- Game time: 3:00 p.m. CDT/1:00 p.m. PDT
- Game weather: Partly sunny, 64 °F (18 °C)
- Game attendance: 42,189
- Referee: Mike Cannon
- TV announcers (Fox): Craig Bolerjack, Joel Klatt, and Petros Papadakis
- Box score, Recap

Game information
First quarter
- No scoring plays

Second quarter

- ORST – Trevor Romaine 43-yard field goal, 13:03. Beavers 3–0. Drive: 9 plays, 42 yards, 2:43.

Third quarter

- ORST – Brandin Cooks 20-yard pass from Sean Mannion (Trevor Romaine kick), 9:33. Beavers 10–0. Drive: 11 plays, 86 yards, 5:24.

Fourth quarter

- WIS – Jacob Pedersen 11-yard pass from Davey O'Brien (Kyle French kick), 1:31. Beavers 10–7. Drive: 8 plays, 64 yards, 1:24.

Statistics	WIS	ORST
First downs	13	18
Total yards	207	354
Rushing yards	35	78
Passing yards	172	276
Turnovers	2	0
Time of possession	24:25	35:35

Team	Category	Player	Statistics
Wisconsin	Passing	Danny O'Brien	20/38, 172 yards, TD, INT
Wisconsin	Rushing	Montee Ball	15 rushes, 61 yards
Wisconsin	Receiving	Jeff Duckworth	7 receptions, 55 yards
Oregon State	Passing	Sean Mannion	29/47, 276 yards, TD
Oregon State	Rushing	Malcolm Agnew	11 rushes, 45 yards
Oregon State	Receiving	Markus Wheaton	8 receptions, 87 yards

=== Utah State ===
Utah State Aggies at Wisconsin Badgers – Game summary

Quarter	1	2	3	4	Total
Aggies	7	7	0	0	14
Badgers	0	3	13	0	16

at Camp Randall Stadium, Madison, Wisconsin

- Date: September 15
- Game time: 7:00 p.m. CDT
- Game weather: Clear, 76 °F (24 °C)
- Game attendance: 79,332
- Referee: Todd Geerlings
- TV announcers (BTN): Matt Devlin, Glen Mason, and Jay Wilson
- Box score, Recap

Game information
First quarter
- USU – Kerwynn Williams 39-yard pass from Chuckie Keeton (Josh Thompson kick), 9:17. Aggies 7–0. Drive: 3 plays, 52 yards, 0:51.

Second quarter

- WIS – Kyle French 19-yard field goal, 14:16. Aggies 7–3. Drive: 10 plays, 62 yards, 5:23.
- USU – Matt Austin 11-yard pass from Chuckie Keeton (Josh Thompson kick), 0:29. Aggies 14–3. Drive: 5 plays, 24 yards, 1:48.

Third quarter

- WIS – Kenzel Doe 82-yard punt return (Kyle French kick), 7:06. Aggies 14–10.
- WIS – Montee Ball 17-yard run (kick blocked), 3:06. Badgers 16–14. Drive: 6 plays, 42 yards, 3:03.

Fourth quarter

- No scoring plays

Statistics	USU	WIS
First downs	13	12
Total yards	308	234
Rushing yards	127	156
Passing yards	181	78
Turnovers	0	1
Time of possession	26:55	33:05

Team	Category	Player	Statistics
Utah State	Passing	Chuckie Keeton	18/34, 181 yards, 2 TD
Utah State	Rushing	Chuckie Keeton	15 rushes, 75 yards
Utah State	Receiving	Kerwynn Williams	6 receptions, 78 yards, TD
Wisconsin	Passing	Danny O'Brien	5/10, 63 yards
Wisconsin	Rushing	Montee Ball	37 rushes, 139 yards, TD
Wisconsin	Receiving	Brian Wozniak	2 receptions, 24 yards

=== UTEP ===
UTEP Miners at Wisconsin Badgers – Game summary

Quarter	1	2	3	4	Total
Miners	6	3	7	10	26
Badgers	2	21	0	14	37

at Camp Randall Stadium, Madison, Wisconsin

- Date: September 22
- Game time: 11:00 a.m. CDT
- Game weather: Cloudy, 44 °F (7 °C)
- Game attendance: 79,806
- Referee: John O'Neill
- TV announcers (ESPN2): Beth Mowins, Joey Galloway, and Lewis Johnson
- Box score, Recap

Game information
First quarter
- UTEP – Michael Edwards 39-yard pass from Nick Lamaison (kick blocked), 2:15. Miners 6–0. Drive: 1 play, 54 yards, 0:16.
- WIS – Devin Smith 98-yard PAT return, 2:15. Miners 6–2.

Second quarter

- WIS – Montee Ball 1-yard run (Kyle French kick), 14:13. Badgers 9–6. Drive: 7 plays, 67 yards, 2:56.
- WIS – James White 3-yard run (Jack Russell kick), 10:42. Badgers 16–6. Drive: 4 plays, 86 yards, 1:51.
- WIS – Jared Abbrederis 47-yard pass from Joel Stave (Jack Russell kick), 4:23. Badgers 23–6. Drive: 1 play, 47 yards, 0:08.
- UTEP – Steven Valadez 45-yard field goal, 0:00. Badgers 23–9. Drive: 8 plays, 27 yards, 2:03.

Third quarter

- UTEP – Xay Williams 8-yard run (Steven Valadez kick), 4:57. Badgers 23–16. Drive: 13 plays, 75 yards, 5:20.

Fourth quarter

- UTEP – Steven Valadez 43-yard field goal, 7:59. Badgers 23–19. Drive: 16 plays, 54 yards, 6:57.
- WIS – James White 2-yard run (Jack Russell kick), 3:20. Badgers 30–19. Drive: 9 plays, 75 yards, 4:47.
- WIS – Melvin Gordon 26-yard run (Jack Russell kick), 3:05. Badgers 37–19. Drive: 1 play, 26 yards, 0:07.
- UTEP – Michael Edwards 62-yard pass from Nick Lamaison (Steven Valadez kick), 0:50. Badgers 37–26. Drive: 7 plays, 76 yards, 2:04.

Statistics	UTEP	WIS
First downs	20	21
Total yards	336	423
Rushing yards	77	213
Passing yards	259	210
Turnovers	1	2
Time of possession	31:20	28:40

Team	Category	Player	Statistics
UTEP	Passing	Nick Lamaison	22/39, 259 yards, 2 TD
UTEP	Rushing	Xay Williams	8 rushes, 53 yards, TD
UTEP	Receiving	Michael Edwards	7 receptions, 151 yards, 2 TD
Wisconsin	Passing	Joel Stave	12/17, 210 yards, TD, INT
Wisconsin	Rushing	Melvin Gordon	8 rushes, 112 yards, TD
Wisconsin	Receiving	Jared Abbrederis	6 receptions, 147 yards, TD

=== At No. 22 Nebraska ===
Wisconsin Badgers at No. 22 Nebraska Cornhuskers – Game summary

Quarter	1	2	3	4	Total
Badgers	14	6	7	0	27
No. 22 Cornhuskers	3	7	17	3	30

at Memorial Stadium, Lincoln, Nebraska

- Date: September 29
- Game time: 7:00 p.m. CDT
- Game weather: Clear, 73 °F (23 °C)
- Game attendance: 85,962
- Referee: Bill LeMonnier
- TV announcers (ABC): Brad Nessler, Todd Blackledge, and Holly Rowe
- Box score, Recap

Game information
First quarter
- WIS – Montee Ball 2-yard run (Jack Russell kick), 11:02. Badgers 7–0. Drive: 5 plays, 71 yards, 2:30.
- WIS – Montee Ball 1-yard run (Jack Russell kick), 7:20. Badgers 14–0. Drive: 7 plays, 23 yards, 3:29.
- NEB – Brett Maher 26-yard field goal, 5:29. Badgers 14–3. Drive: 4 plays, 4 yards, 1:39.

Second quarter

- WIS – Jared Abbrederis 29-yard pass from Steve Joel (kick failed), 11:50. Badgers 20–3. Drive: 10 plays, 65 yards, 4:24.
- NEB – Rex Burkhead 3-yard pass from Taylor Martinez (Brett Maher kick), 3:11. Badgers 20–10. Drive: 12 plays, 93 yards, 5:13.

Third quarter

- WIS – Montee Ball 2-yard run (Kyle French kick), 10:29. Badgers 27–10. Drive: 4 plays, 13 yards, 1:17.
- NEB – Taylor Martinez 38-yard run (Brett Maher kick), 8:56. Badgers 27–17. Drive: 4 plays, 77 yards, 1:27.
- NEB – Kyler Reed 10-yard pass from Taylor Martinez (Brett Maher kick), 3:47. Badgers 27–24. Drive: 10 plays, 75 yards, 3:41.
- NEB – Brett Maher 38-yard field goal, 0:55. Tied 27–27. Drive: 7 plays, 47 yards, 1:45.

Fourth quarter

- NEB – Brett Maher 41-yard field goal, 9:41. Cornhuskers 30–27. Drive: 12 plays, 60 yards, 4:22.

Statistics	WIS	NEB
First downs	17	24
Total yards	295	440
Rushing yards	56	259
Passing yards	239	181
Turnovers	1	2
Time of possession	29:00	31:00

Team	Category	Player	Statistics
Wisconsin	Passing	Joel Stave	12/23, 214 yards, TD
Wisconsin	Rushing	Montee Ball	31 rushes, 93 yards, 3 TD
Wisconsin	Receiving	Jared Abbrederis	7 receptions, 142 yards, TD
Nebraska	Passing	Taylor Martinez	17/29, 181 yards, 2 TD
Nebraska	Rushing	Taylor Martinez	13 rushes, 107 yards, TD
Nebraska	Receiving	Kenny Bell	4 receptions, 57 yards

=== Illinois ===
Illinois Fighting Illini at Wisconsin Badgers – Game summary

Quarter	1	2	3	4	Total
Fighting Illini	0	7	0	7	14
Badgers	0	7	3	21	31

at Camp Randall Stadium, Madison, Wisconsin

- Date: October 6
- Game time: 2:30 p.m. CDT
- Game weather: Cloudy, 46 °F (8 °C)
- Game attendance: 80,096
- Referee: Dave Witvoet
- TV announcers (ABC/ESPN2): Bob Wischusen, Danny Kanell, and Maria Taylor
- Box score, Recap

Statistics	ILL	WIS
First downs	15	18
Total yards	284	427
Rushing yards	106	173
Passing yards	178	254
Turnovers	2	2
Time of possession	31:48	28:12

Team	Category	Player	Statistics
Illinois	Passing	Nathan Scheelhaase	18/29, 178 yards, TD, INT
Illinois	Rushing	Nathan Scheelhaase	22 rushes, 84 yards, TD
Illinois	Receiving	Darius Millines	5 receptions, 54 yards
Wisconsin	Passing	Joel Stave	16/25, 254 yards, 2 TD, INT
Wisconsin	Rushing	Montee Ball	19 rushes, 116 yards, 2 TD
Wisconsin	Receiving	Jared Abbrederis	7 receptions, 117 yards, TD

=== At Purdue ===
Wisconsin Badgers at Purdue Boilermakers – Game summary

Quarter	1	2	3	4	Total
Badgers	7	10	7	14	38
Boilermakers	7	0	0	7	14

at Ross–Ade Stadium, West Lafayette, Indiana

- Date: October 13
- Game time: 11:00 a.m. CDT/12:00 p.m. EDT
- Game weather: Mostly cloudy, 59 °F (15 °C)
- Game attendance: 46,007
- Referee: Dennis Lipski
- TV: BTN
- Box score, Recap

Statistics	WIS	PUR
First downs	30	11
Total yards	645	252
Rushing yards	467	128
Passing yards	178	124
Turnovers	1	1
Time of possession	38:42	21:18

Team	Category	Player	Statistics
Wisconsin	Passing	Joel Stave	12/21, 178 yards, TD, INT
Wisconsin	Rushing	Montee Ball	29 rushes, 247 yards, 3 TD
Wisconsin	Receiving	Jacob Pedersen	4 receptions, 77 yards, TD
Purdue	Passing	Caleb TerBush	7/16, 80 yards, INT
Purdue	Rushing	Akeem Hunt	4 rushes, 85 yards, 1 TD
Purdue	Receiving	Antavian Edison	3 receptions, 58 yards

=== Minnesota ===
Minnesota Golden Gophers at Wisconsin Badgers – Game summary

Quarter	1	2	3	4	Total
Golden Gophers	6	0	7	0	13
Badgers	7	7	10	14	38

at Camp Randall Stadium, Madison, Wisconsin

- Date: October 20
- Game time: 11:00 a.m. CDT
- Game weather: Sunny, 48 °F (9 °C)
- Game attendance: 80,587
- Referee: Todd Gerrling
- TV: ESPNU
- Box score, Recap

Statistics	MINN	WIS
First downs	12	24
Total yards	245	443
Rushing yards	96	337
Passing yards	149	106
Turnovers	2	0
Time of possession	25:04	34:56

Team	Category	Player	Statistics
Minnesota	Passing	Philip Nelson	13/24, 149 yards, 2 TD, 2 INT
Minnesota	Rushing	Philip Nelson	16 rushes, 67 yards
Minnesota	Receiving	Brandon Green	3 receptions, 44 yards, TD
Wisconsin	Passing	Joel Stave	7/15, 106 yards
Wisconsin	Rushing	James White	15 rushes, 175 yards, 3 TD
Wisconsin	Receiving	Jared Abbrederis	2 receptions, 68 yards

=== Michigan State ===
Michigan State Spartans at No. 25 Wisconsin Badgers – Game summary

Quarter	1	2	3	4	OT	Total
Spartans	3	0	0	7	6	16
No. 25 Badgers	7	0	0	3	3	13

at Camp Randall Stadium, Madison, Wisconsin

- Date: October 27
- Game time: 2:30 p.m. CDT
- Game weather: Sunny, 44 °F (7 °C)
- Game attendance: 80,538
- Referee: John O'Neill
- TV announcers (ABC/ESPN2): Mike Patrick, Ed Cunningham, and Jeannine Edwards
- Box score, Recap

Statistics	MSU	WIS
First downs	17	10
Total yards	277	190
Rushing yards	61	19
Passing yards	216	171
Turnovers	1	0
Time of possession	29:05	30:55

Team	Category	Player	Statistics
Michigan State	Passing	Andrew Maxwell	24/39, 216 yards, 2 TD
Michigan State	Rushing	Le'Veon Bell	21 rushes, 77 yards
Michigan State	Receiving	Keith Mumphery	5 receptions, 63 yards
Wisconsin	Passing	Joel Stave	9/11, 127 yards, TD
Wisconsin	Rushing	Montee Ball	22 rushes, 46 yards
Wisconsin	Receiving	Jacob Pedersen	3 receptions, 65 yards, TD

=== At Indiana ===
Wisconsin Badgers at Indiana Hoosiers – Game summary

Quarter	1	2	3	4	Total
Badgers	14	10	17	21	62
Hoosiers	0	7	0	7	14

at Memorial Stadium, Bloomington, Indiana

- Date: November 10
- Game time: 11:00 a.m. CST/12:00 p.m. EST
- Game weather: Sunny, 63 °F (17 °C)
- Game attendance: 43,240
- Referee: Dan Capron
- TV announcers (ESPN2): Beth Mowins and Joey Galloway
- Box score, Recap

Statistics	WIS	IND
First downs		
Total yards		
Rushing yards		
Passing yards		
Turnovers		
Time of possession		

Team	Category	Player	Statistics
Wisconsin	Passing		
Wisconsin	Rushing		
Wisconsin	Receiving		
Indiana	Passing		
Indiana	Rushing		
Indiana	Receiving		

=== No. 6 Ohio State ===
No. 6 Ohio State Buckeyes at Wisconsin Badgers – Game summary

Quarter	1	2	3	4	OT	Total
No. 6 Buckeyes	7	7	0	0	7	21
Badgers	0	7	0	7	0	14

at Camp Randall Stadium, Madison, Wisconsin

- Date: November 17
- Game time: 2:30 p.m. CST
- Game weather: Sunny, 54 °F (12 °C)
- Game attendance: 80,112
- Referee: Bill LeMonnier
- TV announcers (ABC/ESPN2): Joe Tessitore and Matt Millen
- Box score, Recap

Statistics	OSU	WIS
First downs		
Total yards		
Rushing yards		
Passing yards		
Turnovers		
Time of possession		

Team	Category	Player	Statistics
Ohio State	Passing		
Ohio State	Rushing		
Ohio State	Receiving		
Wisconsin	Passing		
Wisconsin	Rushing		
Wisconsin	Receiving		

During the game, there was a ceremony to honor the 1962 Wisconsin Badgers football team on the 50th anniversary of their Big Ten Championship.

=== At Penn State ===
Wisconsin Badgers at Penn State Nittany Lions – Game summary

Quarter	1	2	3	4	OT	Total
Badgers	14	0	0	7	0	21
Nittany Lions	7	0	6	8	3	24

at Beaver Stadium, University Park, Pennsylvania

- Date: November 24
- Game time: 2:30 p.m. CST/3:30 p.m. EST
- Game weather: Cloudy with flurries, 32 °F (0 °C)
- Game attendance: 93,505
- Referee: Dave Witvoet
- TV announcers (ESPN2): Mark Jones and Brock Huard
- Box score, Recap

Statistics	WIS	PSU
First downs		
Total yards		
Rushing yards		
Passing yards		
Turnovers		
Time of possession		

Team	Category	Player	Statistics
Wisconsin	Passing		
Wisconsin	Rushing		
Wisconsin	Receiving		
Penn State	Passing		
Penn State	Rushing		
Penn State	Receiving		

=== Vs. No. 14 Nebraska (Big Ten Championship) ===
2012 Big Ten Championship Game
No. 14 Nebraska Cornhuskers vs. Wisconsin Badgers – Game summary

Quarter	1	2	3	4	Total
No. 14 Cornhuskers	10	0	7	14	31
Badgers	21	21	21	7	70

at Lucas Oil Stadium, Indianapolis, Indiana

- Date: December 1
- Game time: 7:00 p.m. CST/8:00 p.m. EST
- Game weather: None (retractable roof closed)
- Game attendance: 41,260
- Referee: John O'Neill
- TV announcers (Fox): Gus Johnson, Charles Davis, and Julie Alexandria
- Box score, Recap

Statistics	NEB	WIS
First downs		
Total yards		
Rushing yards		
Passing yards		
Turnovers		
Time of possession		

Team	Category	Player	Statistics
Nebraska	Passing		
Nebraska	Rushing		
Nebraska	Receiving		
Wisconsin	Passing		
Wisconsin	Rushing		
Wisconsin	Receiving		

Wisconsin had 2 running backs run for over 200 yards (Montee Ball and Melvin Gordon) and Badgers running backs accounted for 8 rushing touchdowns on the day (along with a passing touchdown by running back James White). The 70 points tied the second-highest mark in Wisconsin history, set against Northwestern in 2010 and Austin Peay in 2010 (the Wisconsin record for most points in a game is 83 against Indiana in 2010). The Badgers returned their first interception for a touchdown, as senior defensive back Marcus Cromartie returned a deflected Taylor Martinez pass 29 yards to put Wisconsin up 14-0 less than 3 minutes into the game.

A wild rushing touchdown by Taylor Martinez and a Brett Maher field goal narrowed Wisconsin's advantage to 14-10, but the Badgers went 45 yards on two plays to set up another scoring drive, capped off by a 9-yard rushing touchdown by James White. When Nebraska's offense stalled, Wisconsin's offense roared into gear and scored three more touchdowns in the 2nd quarter alone, taking a 42-10 lead at the half with a James White passing touchdown to TE Sam Arneson.

In the second half, Nebraska managed to gain a grand total of 3 yards before Martinez threw his second interception on Nebraska's first drive of the half. Wisconsin scored on the next play, taking a 49-10 lead.

The Badgers secured their third consecutive Big Ten Championship and a third consecutive Rose Bowl berth with the blowout win, improving to 8-5 on the year and snapping their 2-game losing streak.

On December 4, head coach Bret Bielema announced he would take the head coaching vacancy at the University of Arkansas, ending his career at Wisconsin after 7 seasons (from 2006 to 2012). Bielema had a 68-24 overall record in 7 seasons at Wisconsin and his teams went 37-19 in Big Ten conference games. In addition, Bielema won both of the first two Big Ten Conference Championship Games.

=== Vs. No. 8 Stanford (Rose Bowl) ===
2013 Rose Bowl
Wisconsin Badgers vs. No. 8 Stanford Cardinal – Game summary

Quarter	1	2	3	4	Total
Badgers	0	14	0	0	14
No. 8 Cardinal	14	3	0	3	20

at Rose Bowl, Pasadena, California

- Date: January 1, 2013
- Game time: 4:10 p.m. CST/2:10 p.m. PST
- Game weather: Partly cloudy, 61 °F (16 °C)
- Game attendance: 93,359
- Referee: Jerry McGinn
- TV announcers (ABC): Brent Musburger, Kirk Herbstreit, Heather Cox, and Tom Rinaldi
- Box score, Recap

Statistics	WIS	STAN
First downs		
Total yards		
Rushing yards		
Passing yards		
Turnovers		
Time of possession		

Team	Category	Player	Statistics
Wisconsin	Passing		
Wisconsin	Rushing		
Wisconsin	Receiving		
Stanford	Passing		
Stanford	Rushing		
Stanford	Receiving		

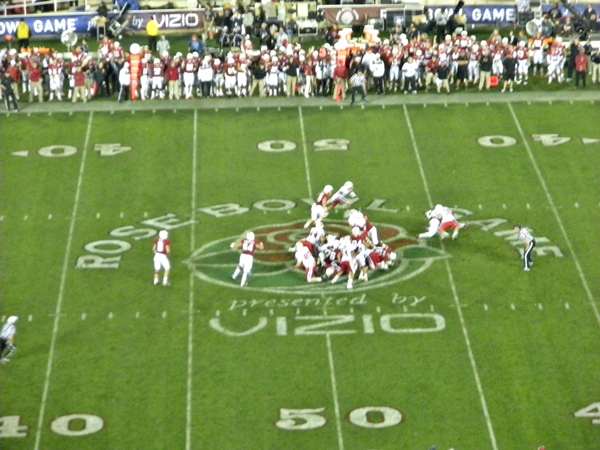
Stanford defeated Wisconsin in the 2013 Rose Bowl

== Personnel ==
=== Coaching staff ===
Name	Position
Bret Bielema	Head coach
Matt Canada	Offensive coordinator, quarterbacks coach
Chris Ash	Defensive coordinator, defensive backs coach
Zach Azzanni	Wide receivers coach
Andy Buh	Linebackers coach
Eddie Faulkner	Tight ends coach
Thomas Hammock	Assistant head coach, running backs coach recruiting coordinator
Mike Markuson	Offensive line coach
Bart Miller	Offensive line coach
Charlie Partridge	Associate head coach, co-defensive coordinator, defensive line coach
Ben Strickland	Defensive backs, special teams coach
Terrance Jamison	Graduate assistant

=== Roster ===
(as of October 15, 2012)
Quarterbacks: 2 Joel Stave – (redshirt) Freshman; 5 Jon Budmayr – (redshirt) Junior; 6 Danny O'Brien - (redshirt) Junior; 9 Chase Knox - Freshman; 10 Curt Phillips – (redshirt) Senior; 13 Bart Houston - Freshman; 15 Thad Armstrong - Freshman; 16 Clay Rust - Freshman; Wide receivers: 1 AJ Jordan – (redshirt) Freshman; 3 Kenzel Doe – Sophomore; 4 Jared Abbrederis – (redshirt) Junior; 8 Isaiah Williams – (redshirt) Sophomore; 9 Jordan Fredrick – (redshirt) Freshman; 15 Jeff Duckworth – (redshirt) Junior; 16 Reggie Love Jr. - Freshman; 17 Derek Hasanoglu – (redshirt) Freshman; 18 Lance Baretz – (redshirt) Freshman; 19 Manasseh Garner – Junior; 28 Leo Musso - Freshman; 30 Alex Erickson - Freshman; 31 Connor Cummins – (redshirt) Sophomore; 82 Jake Stengel – (redshirt) Freshman; 89 Chase Hammond – (redshirt) Sophomore	Running backs: 20 James White – Junior; 22 Jeff Lewis – (redshirt) Sophomore; 23 Vonte Jackson - Freshman; 25 Melvin Gordon – (redshirt) Freshman; 26 Derek Straus – (redshirt) Freshman; 27 Kyle Zuleger – (redshirt) Junior; 28 Montee Ball – Senior; 34 Derek Watt (FB) – (redshirt) Freshman; 37 Kevin MacCudden (FB) – Sophomore; 86 Sherard Cadogan (FB) – (redshirt) Sophomore; Tight ends: 38 Eric Steffes - Freshman; 42 Alex Walker - Freshman; 46 Austin Traylor – (redshirt) Freshman; 48 Jacob Pedersen – (redshirt) Junior; 49 Sam Arneson – Sophomore; 81 Brock DeCicco – (redshirt) Junior; 87 Scot MacMillan – Sophomore; 85 Brian Wozniak – (redshirt) Junior; 90 Matt Prell - Freshman; Offensive line: 54 Kyle Costigan – (redshirt) Sophomore; 55 Joseph McNamara – (redshirt) Sophomore; 56 Riki Kodanko – (redshirt) Sophomore; 57 Jake Meador - Freshman; 58 Ricky Wagner – (redshirt) Senior; 61 Tyler Marz – (redshirt) Freshman; 62 Walker Williams - Freshman; 64 Robert Burge – (redshirt) Senior; 65 Jonathan Coon – (redshirt) Freshman; 70 Dan Voltz - Freshman; 71 Ray Ball – (redshirt) Freshman; 72 Travis Frederick – (redshirt) Junior; 73 Dallas Lewallen – (redshirt) Sophomore; 75 Zac Matthias – (redshirt) Junior; 78 Rob Havenstein – (redshirt) Sophomore; 79 Ryan Groy – (redshirt) Junior	Defensive line: 11 David Gilbert – (redshirt) Junior; 41 Jesse Hayes – (redshirt) Freshman; 45 Warren Herring – (redshirt) Sophomore; 50 Josh Harrison – (redshirt) Sophomore; 51 Tyler Dippel – (redshirt) Junior; 55 Trent Denlinger - Freshman; 58 Jacob Ninneman – (redshirt) Sophomore; 68 Logan Schmidt - Freshman; 74 Konrad Zagzebski – (redshirt) Sophomore; 76 Arthur Goldberg - Freshman; 77 Bryce Gilbert – (redshirt) Sophomore; 87 Ethan Hemer – (redshirt) Junior; 92 Pat Muldoon – (redshirt) Junior; 94 Scot Granger – Junior; 97 Brendan Kelly – (redshirt) Senior; 99 James Adeyanju – (redshirt) Freshman; Linebackers: 13 Conor O'Neill – (redshirt) Junior; 17 AJ Fenton – (redshirt) Junior; 30 Derek Landisch – Sophomore; 31 Josh Peprah – (redshirt) Junior; 36 Ethan Armstrong – (redshirt) Junior; 42 Tyler Byers – (redshirt) Sophomore; 44 Chris Borland – (redshirt) Junior; 46 Jake Rademacher - Freshman; 47 Vince Biegel - Freshman; 52 Nick Hill – (redshirt) Junior; 53 Mike Taylor – (redshirt) Senior; 57 Ben Ruechel – (redshirt) Sophomore; 59 Marcus Trotter – (redshirt) Sophomore; 93 Jake Keefer – (redshirt) Freshman	Defensive backs: 3 Jameson Wright – (redshirt) Sophomore; 5 Darius Hillary – (redshirt) Freshman; 7 Michael Caputo – (redshirt) Freshman; 10 Devin Smith – (redshirt) Senior; 12 Dezmen Southward – (redshirt) Junior; 14 Marcus Cromartie – (redshirt) Senior; 14 Nate Hammon Jr. - Freshman; 18 Dare Ogunbowale - Freshman; 19 Hugs Etienne - Freshman; 19 Joe Schobert - Freshman; 21 Peniel Jean – (redshirt) Sophomore; 22 Darius Feaster – (redshirt) Junior; 23 Jerry Ponio – (redshirt) Junior; 24 Shelton Johnson – (redshirt) Senior; 26 Reggie Mitchell - Freshman; 29 Terrance Floyd – (redshirt) Freshman; 32 Devin Gaulden – Sophomore; 43 Michael Trotter – (redshirt) Sophomore; Punters: 12 Matt Salerno – Freshman; 90 Drew Meyer – (redshirt) Freshman; 91 Brett Nethery – Freshman; Place kickers: 17 Jack Russell - Freshman; 94 Kyle French – (redshirt) Sophomore; 96 Stephen Salata - Freshman; Long snappers: 56 James McGuire – (redshirt) Sophomore; 60 Connor Udelhoven – Freshman

=== Regular starters ===
Position	Player
Quarterback	Joel Stave
Running Back	Montee Ball
Fullback	Derek Watt
Wide receiver	Jared Abbrederis
Wide receiver	Jordan Fredrick
Tight end	Jacob Pedersen / Brian Wozniak
Left tackle	Ricky Wagner
Left guard	Ryan Groy
Center	Travis Frederick
Right guard	Kyle Costigan
Right tackle	Rob Havenstein

Position	Player
Defensive end	David Gilbert
Defensive tackle	Beau Allen
Defensive tackle	Ethan Hemer
Defensive end	Pat Muldoon
Outside linebacker	Mike Taylor
Middle linebacker	Chris Borland
Outside linebacker	Ethan Armstrong
Cornerback	Devin Smith
Strong safety	Dezmen Southward
Free safety	Shelton Johnson
Cornerback	Marcus Cromartie

=== Recruiting ===
College recruiting
Name	Hometown	School	Height	Weight	40^{‡}	Commit date
Vince Biegel; LB	Wisconsin Rapids, WI	Lincoln HS	6 ft 3 in (1.91 m)	210 lb (95 kg)	4.6	Apr 23, 2011
Vince Biegel; LB	Recruit ratings: Scout: Rivals: (80)					
Hugs Etienne; CB	Plantation, FL	South Plantation HS	5 ft 10 in (1.78 m)	175 lb (79 kg)	N/A	Jun 22, 2011
Hugs Etienne; CB	Recruit ratings: Scout: Rivals: (78)					
Arthur Goldberg; DT	Pittsburgh, PA	Mount Lebanon HS	6 ft 3 in (1.91 m)	250 lb (110 kg)	N/A	Jun 23, 2011
Arthur Goldberg; DT	Recruit ratings: Scout: Rivals: (75)					
Bart Houston; QB	Concord, CA	De La Salle HS	6 ft 3 in (1.91 m)	200 lb (91 kg)	N/A	May 3, 2011
Bart Houston; QB	Recruit ratings: Scout: Rivals: (80)					
Vonte Jackson; RB	Kenosha, WI	Bradford HS	6 ft 0 in (1.83 m)	175 lb (79 kg)	4.53	Mar 26, 2011
Vonte Jackson; RB	Recruit ratings: Scout: Rivals: (79)					
Reggie Love; WR	Boca Raton, FL	Spanish River HS	6 ft 2 in (1.88 m)	200 lb (91 kg)	N/A	Nov 5, 2011
Reggie Love; WR	Recruit ratings: Scout: Rivals: (72)					
Jake Meador; OT	Whiteland, IN	Whiteland Community HS	6 ft 6 in (1.98 m)	305 lb (138 kg)	N/A	Feb 1, 2012
Jake Meador; OT	Recruit ratings: Scout: Rivals: (77)					
Reggie Mitchell; WR	Pittsburgh, PA	Shady Side Academy	5 ft 11 in (1.80 m)	166 lb (75 kg)	4.82	Jun 23, 2011
Reggie Mitchell; WR	Recruit ratings: Scout: Rivals: (74)					
Leo Musso; RB	Waunakee, WI	Waunakee HS	5 ft 9 in (1.75 m)	186 lb (84 kg)	4.64	Jan 27, 2012
Leo Musso; RB	Recruit ratings: Scout: Rivals: (45)					
D.J. Singleton; S	Jersey City, NJ	St. Peter's Prep	6 ft 2 in (1.88 m)	200 lb (91 kg)	4.5	Aug 21, 2011
D.J. Singleton; S	Recruit ratings: Scout: Rivals: (79)					
Dan Voltz; OT	Barrington, IL	Barrington HS	6 ft 5 in (1.96 m)	290 lb (130 kg)	5.4	Mar 15, 2011
Dan Voltz; OT	Recruit ratings: Scout: Rivals: (80)					
Walker Williams; OT	Tacoma, WA	Tacoma Baptist HS	6 ft 6 in (1.98 m)	320 lb (150 kg)	N/A	Aug 12, 2011
Walker Williams; OT	Recruit ratings: Scout: Rivals: (76)					
Overall recruit ranking: Scout: 63
‡ Refers to 40-yard dash; Note: In many cases, Scout, Rivals, 247Sports, On3, and ESPN may conflict in their listings of height, weight and 40 time.; In these cases, the average was taken. ESPN grades are on a 100-point scale.; Sources: "Wisconsin Badgers Commits 2012". ESPN.; "2012 Team Ranking". Rivals.com.

== Watchlists and preseason awards ==
- Jared Abbrederis

Biletnikoff Award

- Montee Ball

Doak Walker Award
Maxwell Award
Walter Camp Award

- Chris Borland

Bednarik Award
Butkus Award
Lombardi Award
Nagurski Trophy

- Travis Frederick

Lombardi Award
Outland Trophy
Rimington Trophy

- Jacob Pedersen

Mackey Award

- Mike Taylor

Lombardi Award
Nagurski Trophy

- Ricky Wagner

Lombardi Award
Outland Trophy

- James White

Doak Walker Award

=== Postseason awards ===
- Jared Abbrederis

First Team All-Big Ten (Consensus)

- Beau Allen

All-Big Ten Honorable mention (Consensus)

- Montee Ball

Ameche-Dayne Running Back of the Year
First Team All-Big Ten (Consensus)
First Team All-American (American Football Coaches Association, Associated Press, ESPN)
Consensus All-American
Jim Brown Award
Doak Walker Award

- Chris Borland

First Team All-Big Ten (Coaches) / Honorable mention (Media)

- Marcus Cromartie

All-Big Ten Honorable mention (Consensus)

- Travis Frederick

First Team All-Big Ten (Media) / Honorable mention (Coaches)

- David Gilbert

All-Big Ten Honorable mention (Consensus)

- Ryan Groy

Second Team All-Big Ten (Coaches) / Honorable mention (Media)

- Ethan Hemer

All-Big Ten Honorable mention (Coaches)

- Drew Meyer

All-Big Ten Honorable mention (Media)

- Jacob Pedersen

Kwalick-Clark Tight End of the Year
First Team All-Big Ten (Coaches) / Honorable mention (Media)

- Devin Smith

Second Team All-Big Ten (Media) / Honorable mention (Coaches)

- Dezmen Southward

All-Big Ten Honorable mention (Consensus)

- Mike Taylor

First Team All-Big Ten (Media) / Honorable mention (Coaches)

- Ricky Wagner

First Team All-Big Ten (Consensus)
Second Team All-American (CBS Sports)

== Statistics ==
=== Passing ===
Note: G = Games played; COMP = Completions; ATT = Attempts; COMP % = Completion percentage; YDS = Passing yards; TD = Passing touchdowns; INT = Interceptions; EFF = Passing efficiency

Pos.	Player	G	COMP	ATT	COMP %	YDS	TD	INT	EFF
WR	Jared Abbrederis	13	1	1	100.0	27	0	0	326.8
QB	Danny O'Brien	7	52	86	60.5	523	3	1	120.7
QB	Curt Phillips	7	46	81	56.8	540	5	2	128.2
QB	Joel Stave	8	70	119	58.8	1104	6	3	148.3
RB	James White	14	1	2	50.0	3	1	0	227.6

=== Rushing ===
Note: G = Games played; ATT = Attempts; YDS = Yards; AVG = Average yard per carry; LG = Longest run; TD = Rushing touchdowns

Pos.	Player	G	ATT	YDS	AVG	LG	TD
WR	Jared Abbrederis	13	8	83	10.4	24	0
RB	Montee Ball	14	356	1830	5.1	67	22
WR	Kenzel Doe	14	2	11	5.5	12	0
RB	Melvin Gordon	14	62	621	10.0	60	3
RB	Jeffrey Lewis	3	4	13	3.2	6	1
QB	Danny O'Brien	7	15	-82	-5.5	7	0
TE	Jacob Pedersen	14	1	10	10.0	0	0
QB	Curt Phillips	7	27	99	3.7	52	0
QB	Joel Stave	8	19	-51	-2.7	16	0
FB	Derek Watt	14	2	5	2.5	3	0
RB	James White	14	125	806	6.4	69	12

=== Receiving ===
Note: G = Games played; REC = Receptions; YDS = Yards; AVG = Average yard per catch; LG = Longest catch; TD = Receiving touchdowns

Pos.	Player	G	REC	YDS	AVG	LG	TD
TE	Sam Arneson	13	4	19	4.8	9	2
WR	Jared Abbrederis	13	49	837	17.1	60	5
RB	Montee Ball	14	10	72	7.2	16	0
WR	Kenzel Doe	14	16	121	7.6	19	0
WR	Jeff Duckworth	13	9	60	6.7	10	1
WR	Jordan Fredrick	14	17	196	11.5	20	1
RB	Melvin Gordon	14	2	65	32.5	57	1
WR	Chase Hammond	12	5	50	10.0	30	0
WR	Reggie Love	5	1	19	19.0	19	0
TE	Jacob Pedersen	14	27	355	13.1	31	4
QB	Curt Phillips	7	1	27	27.0	27	0
FB	Derek Watt	14	12	150	12.5	33	0
RB	James White	14	8	132	16.5	62	1
TE	Brian Wozniak	14	9	94	10.4	21	0

=== Kick and punt returning ===
Note: G = Games played; PR = Punt returns; PYDS = Punt return yards; PLG = Punt return long; KR = Kick returns; KYDS = Kick return yards; KLG = Kick return long; TD = Total return touchdowns

Pos.	Player	G	PR	PYDS	PLG	KR	KYDS	KLG	Total Return TDs
WR	Jared Abbrederis	13	17	111	34	0	0	0	0
DT	Beau Allen	14	1	2	2	0	0	0	0
WR	Kenzel Doe	13	8	99	82	7	195	47	1
RB	Melvin Gordon	14	0	0	0	7	151	32	0
RB	James White	14	0	0	0	6	114	26	0
RB	Kyle Zulegar	14	0	0	0	2	29	20	0

=== Kicking ===
Note: G = Games played; FGM = Field goals made; FGA = Field goals attempted; LG = Field goal long; XPT = Extra points made; XPT ATT = XPT attempted; TP = Total points

Pos.	Player	G	FGM	FGA	LG	XPT	XPT ATT	TP
K	Kyle French	13	10	16	46	38	40	68
K	Jack Russell	8	0	2	0	14	15	14

=== Punting ===
Note: G = Games played; P = Punts; YDS = Yards; AVG = Average per punt; LG = Punt long; In20 = Punts inside the 20; TB = Touchbacks

Pos.	Player	G	P	YDS	AVG	LG	In20	TB
P	Drew Meyer	14	80	3323	41.5	61	36	5

=== Defensive ===
Note: G = Games played; Solo = Solo tackles; Ast = Assisted tackles; Total = Total tackles; TFL-Yds = Tackles for loss-yards lost; Sack = Sacks; INT = Interceptions; PDef = Passes defended; FF = Forced fumbles; FR = Forced recoveries

Pos.	Player	G	Solo	Ast	Total	TFL-Yds	Sack	INT	PDef	FF	FR
LB	Mike Taylor	14	69	54	123	15.0-59	3	0	4	0	1
LB	Chris Borland	12	56	48	104	10.0-40	4.5	0	6	3	3
LB	Ethan Armstrong	14	54	39	93	2.0-6	0	1	5	0	0
S	Dezmen Southward	14	44	25	69	8.0-18	0	1	5	1	0
CB	Marcus Cromartie	14	38	24	62	0.0-0	0	1	13	1	0
CB	Devin Smith	14	35	22	57	1.0-4	1	4	17	1	0
S	Shelton Johnson	11	30	26	56	0.5-0	0	0	4	0	0
DE	David Gilbert	14	21	21	42	9.5-46	4	0	1	3	0
DT	Beau Allen	14	18	19	37	7.5-31	2.5	0	2	1	0
DE	Brendon Kelly	11	17	11	28	6.0-29	5	0	2	0	1
LB	Derek Landisch	14	15	13	28	1.0-1	0	0	1	0	0
DT	Ethan Hemer	14	14	10	24	2.5-12	1	0	3	0	0
S	Michael Trotter	13	14	10	24	1.0-8	1	0	1	0	0
CB	Darius Hillary	14	16	7	23	0.0-0	0	0	2	0	0
DE	Tyler Dippel	13	10	10	20	5.5-34	5	0	1	0	0
DE	Pat Muldoon	11	9	7	16	5.5-18	2.5	0	2	0	0
LB	Conor O'Neill	14	10	5	15	0.0-0	0	1	1	0	0
DT	Warren Herring	14	7	6	13	1.0-6	0.5	0	1	0	1
FB	Derek Watt	14	10	3	13	0.0-0	0	0	0	1	0
CB	Michael Caputo	13	8	2	10	0.0-0	0	0	0	0	0
DT	Bryce Gilbert	13	5	5	10	0.0-0	0	0	0	0	0
RB	Kyle Zulegar	14	4	3	7	0.0-0	0	0	0	0	0
WR	Lance Baretz	12	4	2	6	0.0-0	0	0	0	0	0
LB	Marcus Trotter	4	2	3	5	0.0-0	0	0	0	0	0
DT	Konrad Zagezebski	13	1	3	4	0.0-0	0	0	1	0	0
LB	Jake Keefer	4	2	0	2	0.0-0	0	0	0	0	0
CB	Deven Gaulden	4	0	2	2	0.0-0	0	0	0	0	0
LS	James McGuire	14	2	0	2	0.0-0	0	0	0	0	0
CB	Jerry Ponio	10	0	2	2	0.0-0	0	0	0	0	0
WR	Kenzel Doe	14	1	1	2	0.0-0	0	0	0	0	0
DE	Jacob Ninneman	1	1	0	1	0.0-0	0	0	0	0	0
DE	James Adeyanju	3	1	0	1	0.0-0	0	0	0	0	0
CB	Peniel Jean	5	1	0	1	0.0-0	0	0	1	0	0
WR	Jake Stengel	6	1	0	1	0.0-0	0	0	0	0	1
CB	Terrance Floyd	7	1	0	1	0.0-0	0	0	0	0	0
RB	Derek Straus	4	1	0	1	0.0-0	0	0	0	0	0
DE	Josh Harrison	1	1	0	1	1.0-4	0	0	0	0	0
G	Ryan Groy	14	1	0	1	0.0-0	0	0	0	0	0
C	Travis Frederick	14	1	0	1	0.0-0	0	0	0	0	0
TE	Jacob Pedersen	14	0	1	1	0.0-0	0	0	0	0	0
RB	Melvin Gordon	14	1	0	1	0.0-0	0	0	0	0	0
P	Drew Meyer	14	0	1	1	0.0-0	0	0	0	0	0
RB	Montee Ball	14	0	1	1	0.0-0	0	0	0	0	0

== 2013 NFL draft class ==
2013 NFL draft selections
Round	Pick #	Team	Player	Position
1	31	Dallas Cowboys	Travis Frederick	Center
2	58	Denver Broncos	Montee Ball	Running Back
5	168	Baltimore Ravens	Ricky Wagner	Offensive Tackle

=== Signed undrafted free agents ===
- CB Marcus Cromartie, San Diego Chargers
- CB Devin Smith, Dallas Cowboys
