= Nebraska–Wisconsin football rivalry =

American college football rivalry

- Nebraska Cornhuskers Wisconsin Badgers
- Sport: Football
- First meeting: November 2, 1901; Wisconsin, 18–0
- Latest meeting: November 23, 2024; Nebraska 44, Wisconsin 25
- Next meeting: 2027
- Trophy: Freedom Trophy

Statistics
- Total meetings: 18
- All-time series: Wisconsin leads, 13–5 (.722)
- Trophy series: Wisconsin leads, 9–1
- Largest victory: Nebraska, 37–0 (1965); Wisconsin, 70–31 (2012)
- Longest win streak: Wisconsin, 10 (2012–2023)
- Current win streak: Nebraska, 1 (2024–present)

Locations of Nebraska and Wisconsin

The Nebraska–Wisconsin football rivalry is an American college football rivalry between the Nebraska Cornhuskers and Wisconsin Badgers. Since 2014, the winner has received the Freedom Trophy. Wisconsin leads the series 13–5.

== History ==
=== Non-conference series ===
Nebraska and Wisconsin first met on November 2, 1901, an 18–0 Badgers victory in Milwaukee. The teams did not play again until 1965, the first of three consecutive NU victories before a 1974 Badgers upset of the fourth-ranked Cornhuskers in Lincoln.

Barry Alvarez, a former Nebraska linebacker who faced the Badgers in 1966, became Wisconsin's head coach in 1990. He modeled his program after Tom Osborne's run-heavy scheme that emphasized offensive line play, which became the foundation of a Wisconsin program that remained strong after Alvarez stepped down to become athletic director in 2005.

=== Conference series ===
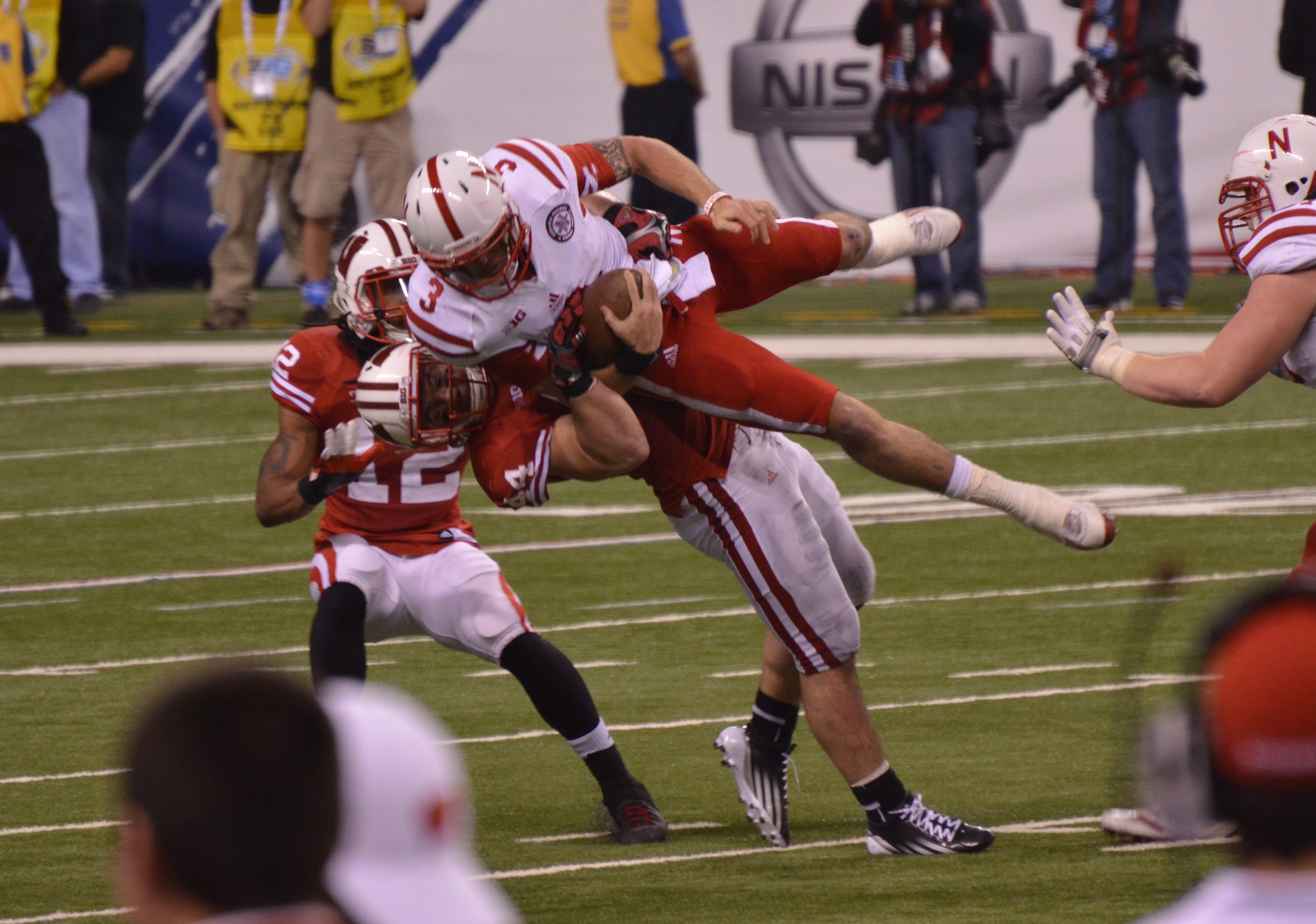
Chris Borland tackles Taylor Martinez during the 2012 Big Ten Championship Game

The teams did not meet again until Nebraska joined the Big Ten Conference in 2011. The Cornhuskers and Badgers were placed in separate divisions, but met in both 2011 and 2012. College GameDay visited Madison for NU's first Big Ten game, a 48–17 Wisconsin victory at Camp Randall Stadium. The following year, Nebraska made the second-largest comeback in program history to defeat the Badgers at Memorial Stadium. In a Big Ten Championship Game rematch two months later, Wisconsin upset No. 14 Nebraska in a dominant 70–31 victory. Though the series had little history, the game was often labeled a rivalry given the similarity between the programs and their high-profile matchups shortly after NU joined the conference.

Big Ten realignment in 2014 placed NU and UW in the West Division, the same year the schools announced the creation of the Freedom Trophy to be presented to the winner of the annual meeting. The trophy is made of bronze and features images of both teams' stadiums with an American flag in the center. Half of the trophy is the east side of Memorial Stadium and half is the north side of Camp Randall Stadium.

Wisconsin won the first Freedom Trophy game 59–24 behind an FBS-record 408 rushing yards from Melvin Gordon (broken by Samaje Perine just one week later). It was the second of ten consecutive Wisconsin victories in the series, including two in overtime. Nebraska ended the streak with a 44–25 victory in 2024.

== Game results ==
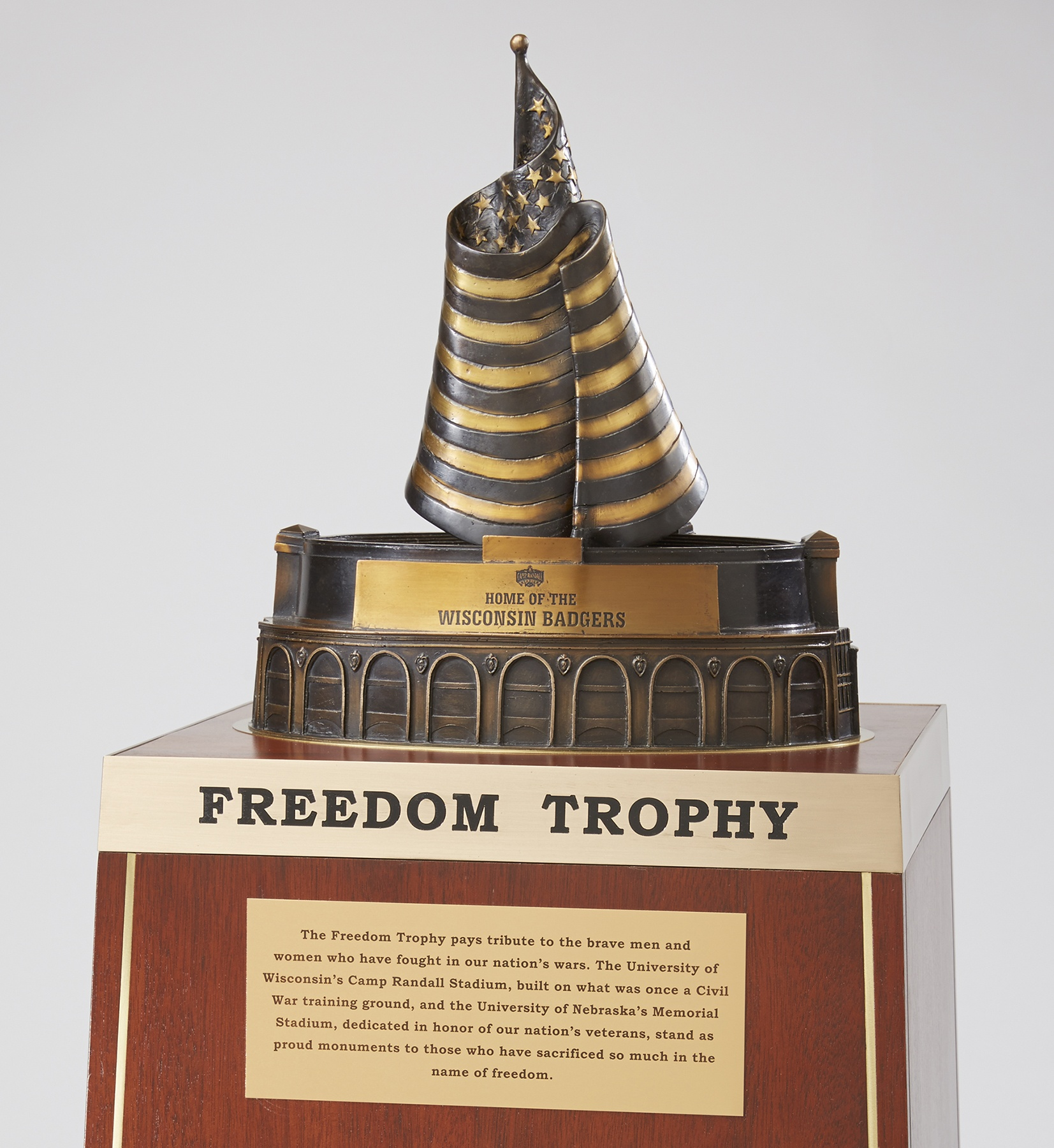
The Freedom Trophy, created in 2014, is presented to the game's winner

Nebraska victories	Wisconsin victories

No.	Date	Location	Winner	Score
1	November 2, 1901	Milwaukee	Wisconsin	18–0
2	October 9, 1965	Lincoln	#2 Nebraska	37–0
3	October 8, 1966	Madison	#7 Nebraska	31–3
4	September 29, 1973	Lincoln	#2 Nebraska	20–16
5	September 21, 1974	Madison	Wisconsin	21–20
6	October 1, 2011	Madison	#7 Wisconsin	48–17
7	September 29, 2012	Lincoln	#20 Nebraska	30–27
8	December 1, 2012	Indianapolis	Wisconsin	70–31
9	November 15, 2014	Madison	#22 Wisconsin	59–24
10	October 10, 2015	Lincoln	Wisconsin	23–21
11	October 29, 2016	Madison	#11 Wisconsin	23–17^{OT}
12	October 7, 2017	Lincoln	#9 Wisconsin	38–17
13	October 6, 2018	Madison	#16 Wisconsin	41–24
14	November 16, 2019	Lincoln	#14 Wisconsin	37–21
15	November 20, 2021	Madison	#19 Wisconsin	35–28
16	November 19, 2022	Lincoln	Wisconsin	15–14
17	November 18, 2023	Madison	Wisconsin	24–17^{OT}
18	November 23, 2024	Lincoln	Nebraska	44–25
Series: Wisconsin leads 13–5
Rankings from the AP poll

== See also ==
- List of NCAA college football rivalry games
