= 2012 Big Ten Football Championship Game =

- Conference Championship
- Championship Game Logo
Nebraska Cornhuskers	Wisconsin Badgers
(10–2)	(7–5)
31	70
Head coach: Bo Pelini	Head coach: Bret Bielema
AP / Coaches / BCS; 14 / 13 / 12
	1	2	3	4	Total
Nebraska	10	0	7	14	31
Wisconsin	21	21	21	7	70
- Date: December 1, 2012
- Season: 2012
- Stadium: Lucas Oil Stadium
- Location: Indianapolis, Indiana
- MVP: Montee Ball, Wisconsin
- Favorite: Nebraska by 12
- Referee: John O'Neill
- Halftime show: University of Nebraska Cornhusker Marching Band, University of Wisconsin Marching Band
- Attendance: 41,260

United States TV coverage
- Network: Fox
- Announcers: Gus Johnson, (Play-by-play) Charles Davis (Color Analyst) and Julie Alexandria (Sideline Reporter)
- Nielsen ratings: 3.0 (4.9 million viewers)

2012 Big Ten Conference football standings
	Conf.			Overall
Team	W		L	W		L
Legends Division
No. 25 Nebraska xy	7	–	1	10	–	4
No. 24 Michigan	6	–	2	8	–	5
No. 17 Northwestern	5	–	3	10	–	3
Michigan State	3	–	5	7	–	6
Iowa	2	–	6	4	–	8
Minnesota	2	–	6	6	–	7
Leaders Division
No. 3 Ohio State* x	8	–	0	12	–	0
Penn State*	6	–	2	8	–	4
Wisconsin y$	4	–	4	8	–	6
Purdue	3	–	5	6	–	7
Indiana	2	–	6	4	–	8
Illinois	0	–	8	2	–	10
Championship: Wisconsin 70, Nebraska 31
$ – BCS representative as conference champion; x – Division champion/co-champions; * Ohio State and Penn State ineligible for conference championship game and post-season bowl games due to NCAA sanctions.; Rankings from AP Poll

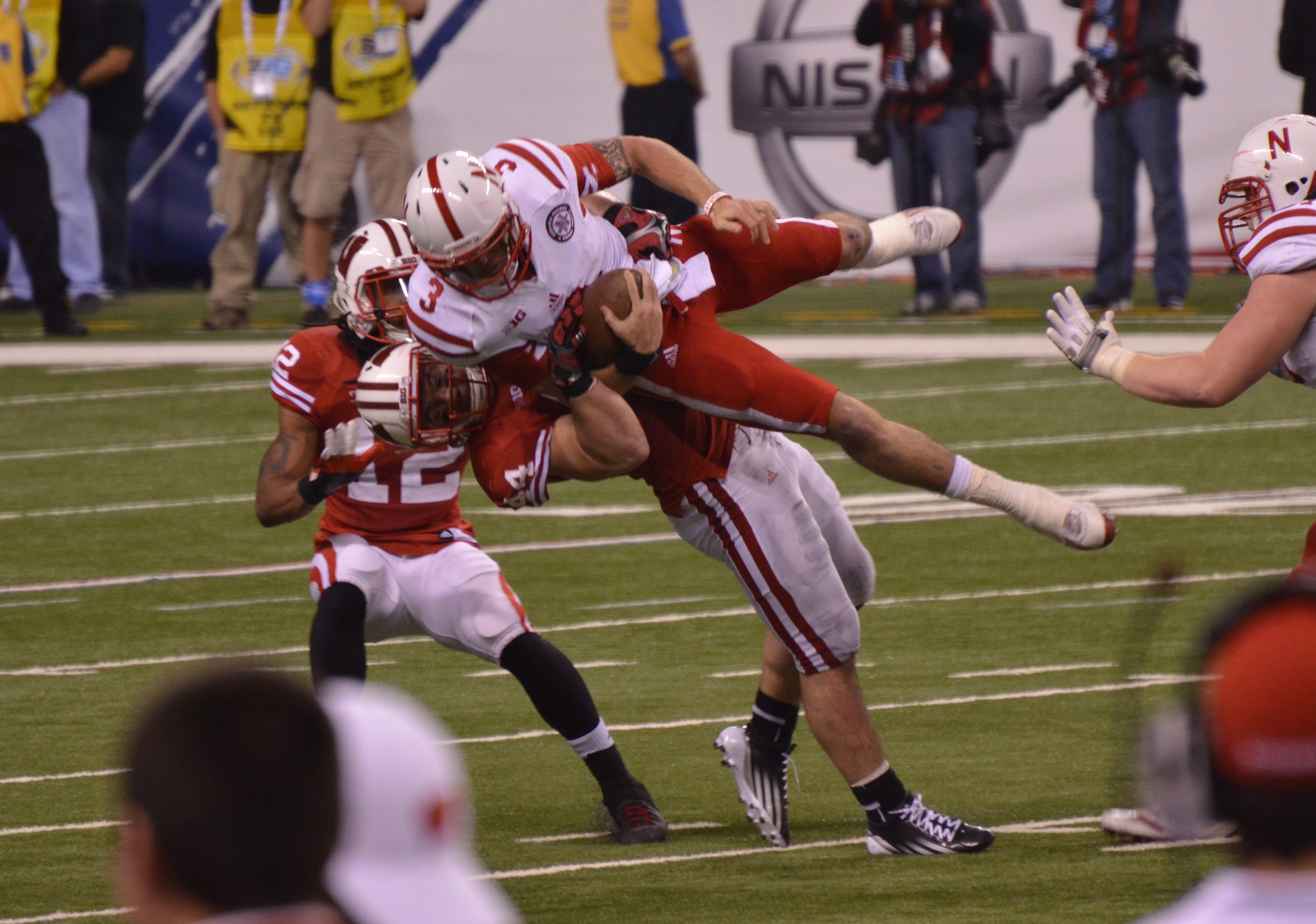
LB Chris Borland tackles QB Taylor Martinez

The 2012 Big Ten Football Championship Game was a college football game. It was played on December 1, 2012, at Lucas Oil Stadium in Indianapolis, Indiana, to determine the 2012 champion of the Big Ten Conference. It was played between the Wisconsin Badgers of the Leaders Division and the Nebraska Cornhuskers of the Legends Division. Wisconsin defeated Nebraska, 70–31.

The game was the second football championship game ever played in the Big Ten's 116-year history; the Big Ten expanded to twelve teams the year before thus becoming eligible under NCAA rules which, at that time, required conferences to have a membership of at least 12 to have a conference championship game. The game was played in prime time and televised by Fox, with kickoff scheduled for 8:17 p.m. Eastern Time. In only the second year of the Big Ten Championship game, one team entered the game unranked in the BCS standings, AP poll, and Coaches' poll.

== Teams ==
The two teams faced each other in the regular season, with Nebraska winning 30–27.

=== Nebraska ===
The Cornhuskers, led by fifth-year head coach Bo Pelini, finished the regular season as the champion of the Legends Division. Nebraska finished the regular season with an overall record of 10–2 and a Big Ten record of 7–1; the team's lone conference loss was against Ohio State, 63–38.

To date, this is Nebraska's lone appearance in the Big Ten Championship Game.

=== Wisconsin ===
Wisconsin finished third place in the Leaders division, but division champion Ohio State and second-place Penn State were ineligible to play in the championship game because of postseason bans. Teams that play in the conference championship game must be eligible for the postseason. The Badgers lost to both Ohio State and Penn State in the regular season, with both losses coming in overtime.

The 2012 Big Ten football championship game would be the last time Bret Bielema coached the Badgers. He departed Wisconsin three days after the Big Ten championship game to accept the head coaching position at Arkansas. Wisconsin's Athletic Director, and former football head coach, Barry Alvarez went on to coach the Badgers at the 2013 Rose Bowl against Stanford.

== Scoring summary ==
2012 Big 10 Championship Game
No. 14 Nebraska Cornhuskers vs. Wisconsin Badgers

Quarter	1	2	3	4	Total
No. 14 Cornhuskers	10	0	7	14	31
Badgers	21	21	21	7	70

at Lucas Oil Stadium, Indianapolis, Indiana

- Date: December 1, 2012
- Game time: 8:00 p.m. EDT
- Game weather: None (played indoors)
- Game attendance: 41,260
- Referee: John O'Neill
- TV announcers (Fox): Gus Johnson, Charles Davis, and Julie Alexandria

Game information
First quarter
- WIS – Melvin Gordon 56-yard run (Kyle French kick), 13:01. Badgers 7–0. Drive: 4 plays, 75 yards, 1:59.
- WIS – Marcus Cromartie 29-yard interception return (Kyle French kick), 12:53. Badgers 14–0.
- NEB – Taylor Martinez 76-yard run (Brett Maher kick), 10:58. Badgers 14–7. Drive: 3 plays, 75 yards, 1:55.
- NEB – Brett Maher 32-yard field goal, 4:46. Badgers 14–10. Drive: 10 plays, 76 yards, 4:30.
- WIS – James White 9-yard run (Kyle French kick), 1:01. Badgers 21–10. Drive: 8 plays, 75 yards, 3:45.

Second quarter

- WIS – James White 1-yard run (Kyle French kick), 11:11. Badgers 28–10. Drive: 6 plays, 67 yards, 3:07.
- WIS – Montee Ball 16-yard run (Kyle French kick), 7:15. Badgers 35–10. Drive: 6 plays, 69 yards, 2:32.
- WIS – Sam Arneson 3-yard pass from James White (Kyle French kick), 0:02. Badgers 42–10. Drive: 4 plays, 79 yards, 0:59.

Third quarter

- WIS – Montee Ball 9-yard run (Jack Russell kick), 14:13. Badgers 49–10. Drive: 1 play, 9 yards, 0:05.
- NEB – Taylor Martinez 11-yard run (Brett Maher kick), 10:47. Badgers 49–17. Drive: 9 plays, 75 yards, 3:26.
- WIS – Montee Ball 57-yard run (Jack Russell kick), 9:27. Badgers 56–17. Drive: 3 plays, 75 yards, 1:20.
- WIS – James White 68-yard run (Jack Russell kick), 6:42. Badgers 63–17. Drive: 4 plays, 80 yards, 1:55.

Fourth quarter

- NEB – Braylon Heard 9-yard run (Brett Maher kick), 12:14. Badgers 63–24. Drive: 11 plays, 74 yards, 4:12.
- WIS – James White 10-yard (Jack Russell kick), 8:57. Badgers 70–24. Drive: 6 plays, 75 yards, 3:17.
- NEB – Imani Cross 26-yard run (Brett Maher kick), 0:51. Badgers 70–31. Drive: 9 plays, 82 yards, 3:58.

== Statistics ==
=== Team statistics ===
Statistics	NEB	WIS
First downs	23	24
Third down efficiency	6 of 16	5 of 9
Fourth down efficiency	1 of 2	0 of 0
Total yards	477	640
Rushes–yards	44–282	50–539
Yards per rush	6.4	10.8
Yards passing	195	101
Pass completions–attempts	18–34	8–10
Interceptions thrown	2	0
Fumbles–lost	2–1	0–0
Penalties–yards	4–40	4–51
Time of possession	30:06	29:45

=== Individual statistics ===
Nebraska statistics
Cornhuskers passing
	C–A	Yds	TD	INT
Taylor Martinez	17–33	184	0	2
Rex Burkhead	1–1	11	0	0
Cornhuskers rushing
	Car	Yds	TD	Avg
Taylor Martinez	19	184	2	7.4
Rex Burkhead	11	61	0	5.5
Imani Cross	3	35	1	11.7
Braylon Heard	6	28	1	4.7
Ameer Abdullah	5	18	0	3.6
Cornhuskers receiving
	Rec	Yds	TD	Avg
Jamal Turner	5	63	0	12.6
Quincy Enunwa	5	51	0	10.2
Kyler Reed	2	29	0	14.5
Rex Burkhead	2	18	0	9.0
Kenny Bell	2	14	0	7.0
Ameer Abdullah	1	11	0	11.0
Ben Cotton	1	9	0	9.0

Wisconsin statistics
Badgers passing
	C–A	Yds	TD	INT
Curt Phillips	6–8	71	0	0
Jared Abbrederis	1–1	27	0	0
James White	1–1	3	1	0
Badgers rushing
	Car	Yds	TD	Avg
Melvin Gordon	9	216	1	24.0
Montee Ball	21	202	3	9.6
James White	15	109	4	7.3
Kenzel Doe	1	12	0	12.0
Curt Phillips	2	3	0	1.5
Badgers receiving
	Rec	Yds	TD	Avg
Jared Abbrederis	2	29	0	14.5
Curt Phillips	1	27	0	27.0
James White	1	22	0	22.0
Derek Watt	1	10	0	10.0
Jacob Pederson	1	9	0	9.0
Sam Arneson	1	3	1	3.0
Jeff Duckworth	1	1	0	1.0

=== Records ===
Montee Ball took over as the record holder for Football Bowl Subdivision "career rushing touchdowns record" from Travis Prentice with 76 touchdowns (Ball scored one touchdown in the 2013 Rose Bowl thus extending the record). Wisconsin set multiple school records in the game; first by scoring eight rushing touchdowns during the game. The second school record for Wisconsin was having two 200-yard rushers in one game. Nebraska set a record for the most rushing touchdowns allowed in a game. Wisconsin's redshirt freshman running back Melvin Gordon ran for a career-high of 216 yards on just nine possessions, averaging 24 yards per carry.

== See also ==
- List of Big Ten Conference football champions
