= Rick Wagner =

American football player (born 1989)

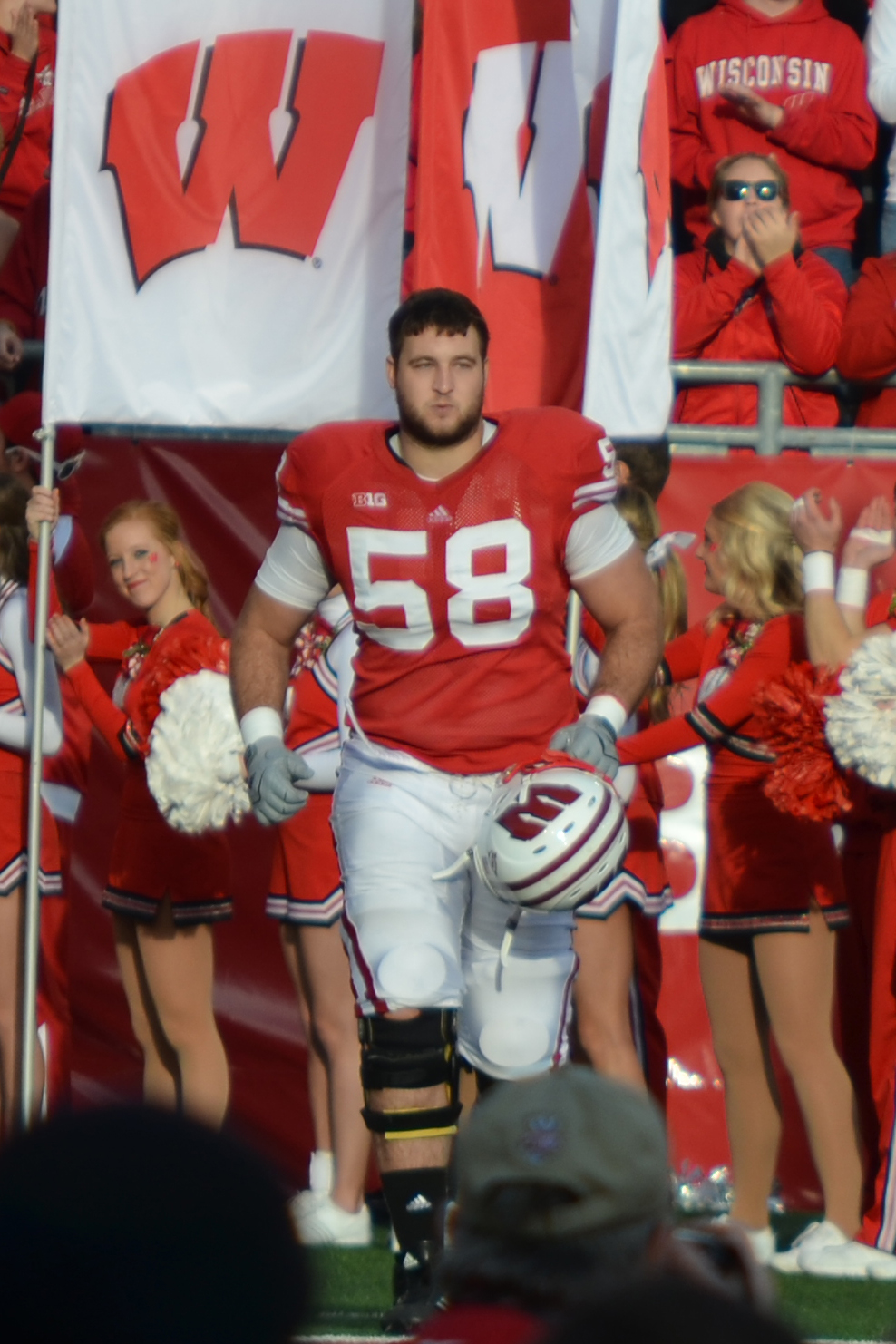
- Wagner with the Wisconsin Badgers in 2012

No. 71
- Position: Offensive tackle

Personal information
- Born: October 21, 1989 (age 37); West Allis, Wisconsin, U.S.
- Listed height: 6 ft 6 in (1.98 m)
- Listed weight: 315 lb (143 kg)

Career information
- High school: Nathan Hale (West Allis)
- College: Wisconsin
- NFL draft: 2013: 5th round, 168th overall pick

Career history
- Baltimore Ravens (2013–2016); Detroit Lions (2017–2019); Green Bay Packers (2020)

Awards and highlights
- First-team All-Big Ten (2012)

Career NFL statistics
- Games played: 118
- Games started: 96
- Stats at Pro Football Reference

Richard Alexander Wagner (born October 21, 1989) is an American former professional football player who was an offensive tackle in the National Football League (NFL). He was selected by the Baltimore Ravens in the fifth round of the 2013 NFL draft. He played college football for the Wisconsin Badgers. Wagner was also a member of the Detroit Lions and Green Bay Packers.

== Early life ==
In high school, Wagner originally played wide receiver to avoid an injury, as his first priority at the time was basketball. It was a compromise with his high school coach that Wagner even played as a sophomore.

== College career ==
Wagner walked on as a tight end.

After redshirting in 2008, Wagner made his college debut on September 12, 2009 against Fresno State. Wagner appeared in 12 of the 13 games during his freshman season.

In 2010, Wagner made his first career start at right tackle on September 18, 2010 against Arizona State. Finished the season playing in 12 games with 10 starts at right tackle. Named consensus honorable mention All-Big Ten by the media and coaches.

In 2011, Wagner started all 14 games at left tackle and was named consensus honorable mention All-Big Ten by the media and coaches for the second straight season.

In 2012, Wagner played and started in 13 of the 14 games during the 2012 season. Before the season, Wagner was on the Outland Trophy watchlist.

== Professional career ==
Pre-draft measurables
Height	Weight	Arm length	Hand span	40-yard dash	20-yard shuttle	Three-cone drill	Vertical jump	Broad jump	Bench press
6 ft 5 7/8 in (1.98 m)	308 lb (140 kg)	34 in (0.86 m)	9 7/8 in (0.25 m)	5.17 s	4.91 s	7.94 s	31.5 in (0.80 m)	8 ft 5 in (2.57 m)	20 reps
All values from NFL Combine

=== Baltimore Ravens ===
Wagner was selected in the fifth round, 168th overall in the 2013 NFL draft by the Baltimore Ravens. On August 18, 2014, Wagner was officially named the Ravens starting right tackle heading into the 2014 season.

=== Detroit Lions ===
On March 10, 2017, Wagner signed a five-year contract with the Detroit Lions. He was named the starting right tackle to begin the 2017 season, starting in 13 games, missing three due to an ankle injury.

The Lions released Wagner on March 13, 2020.

=== Green Bay Packers ===
On March 17, 2020, Wagner signed a two-year, $11 million contract with the Green Bay Packers. He played in all 16 regular season games, starting nine of them, as well as starting both playoff games against the Los Angeles Rams and Tampa Bay Buccaneers.

On February 19, 2021, Wagner was released by the Packers.

== Personal life ==
On June 25, 2016, Rick married his high school sweetheart Kirstin Froehlich in Wisconsin.
