= Chris Borland =

American football player (born 1990)

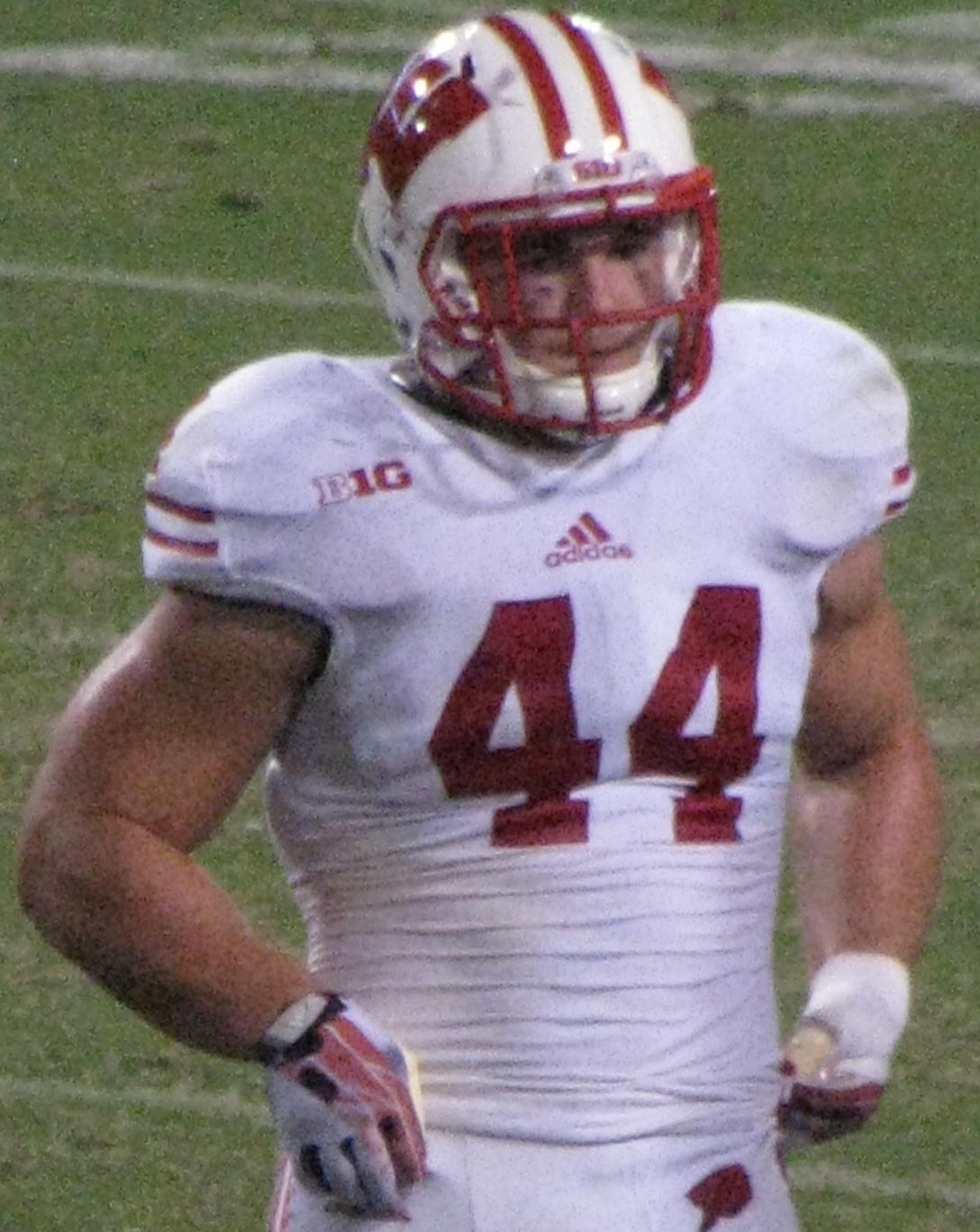
- Borland with the Wisconsin Badgers in 2013

No. 50
- Position: Linebacker

Personal information
- Born: December 26, 1990 (age 35); Kettering, Ohio, U.S.
- Listed height: 5 ft 11 in (1.80 m)
- Listed weight: 248 lb (112 kg)

Career information
- High school: Archbishop Alter (Kettering, Ohio)
- College: Wisconsin (2009–2013)
- NFL draft: 2014: 3rd round, 77th overall pick

Career history
- San Francisco 49ers (2014)

Awards and highlights
- PFWA All-Rookie Team (2014); First-team All-American (2013); Big Ten Defensive Player of the Year (2013); Big Ten Linebacker of the Year (2013); Big Ten Freshman of the Year (2009); 3× First-team All-Big Ten (2011–2013)

Career NFL statistics
- Total tackles: 107
- Sacks: 1
- Fumble recoveries: 1
- Interceptions: 2
- Stats at Pro Football Reference

Christopher Randall Borland (born December 26, 1990) is an American former professional football player who was a linebacker for the San Francisco 49ers of the National Football League (NFL). He played college football for the Wisconsin Badgers, and was selected by the 49ers in the third round of the 2014 NFL draft. He retired after one season and was one of the first NFL players to retire early in his career due to potential concerns of mid-term brain damage from football.

== Early life ==
Borland attended Archbishop Alter High School in Kettering, Ohio, where he was first-team All-state and All-conference player of the year. He was the team captain and MVP. He was a letterman in football, track, basketball and tennis. As a senior, he had 72 tackles, one interception, one forced fumble and two fumble recoveries on defense, and rushed for 1,230 yards and 19 touchdowns on offense.

In track & field, he was one of the state's top performers in the shot put. He placed fifth at the state meet in the shot put as a junior. At the 2008 Fairmont Firebird Invitational, he recorded a PR of 11.97 seconds in the 100 meters. He got a top-throw of 41.05 meters in the discus at the 2008 OHSAA District T&F Championships. He was the runner-up to the state title in the shot put event at the 2009 OHSAA District T&F Championships, recording a career-best throw of 18.62 metres (61.1 ft).

Regarded as a three-star recruit by Rivals.com, he was ranked the No. 55 linebacker nationally. He chose Wisconsin over scholarship offers from Iowa and Louisville.

College recruiting
Name	Hometown	School	Height	Weight	40^{‡}	Commit date
Chris Borland; LB	Kettering, OH	Archbishop Alter HS	6 ft 0 in (1.83 m)	215 lb (98 kg)	4.65	Jun 24, 2008
Chris Borland; LB	Recruit ratings: Scout: Rivals: (74)					
Overall recruit ranking: Scout: 55 (MLB) Rivals: NR ESPN: 134 (ATH)
Note: In many cases, Scout, Rivals, 247Sports, On3, and ESPN may conflict in their listings of height and weight.; In these cases, the average was taken. ESPN grades are on a 100-point scale.; Sources: "Wisconsin Football Commitments". Rivals.; "2009 Wisconsin Football Commits". Scout.; "ESPN". ESPN.; "Scout.com Team Recruiting Rankings". Scout.; "2009 Team Ranking". Rivals.com.

== College career ==
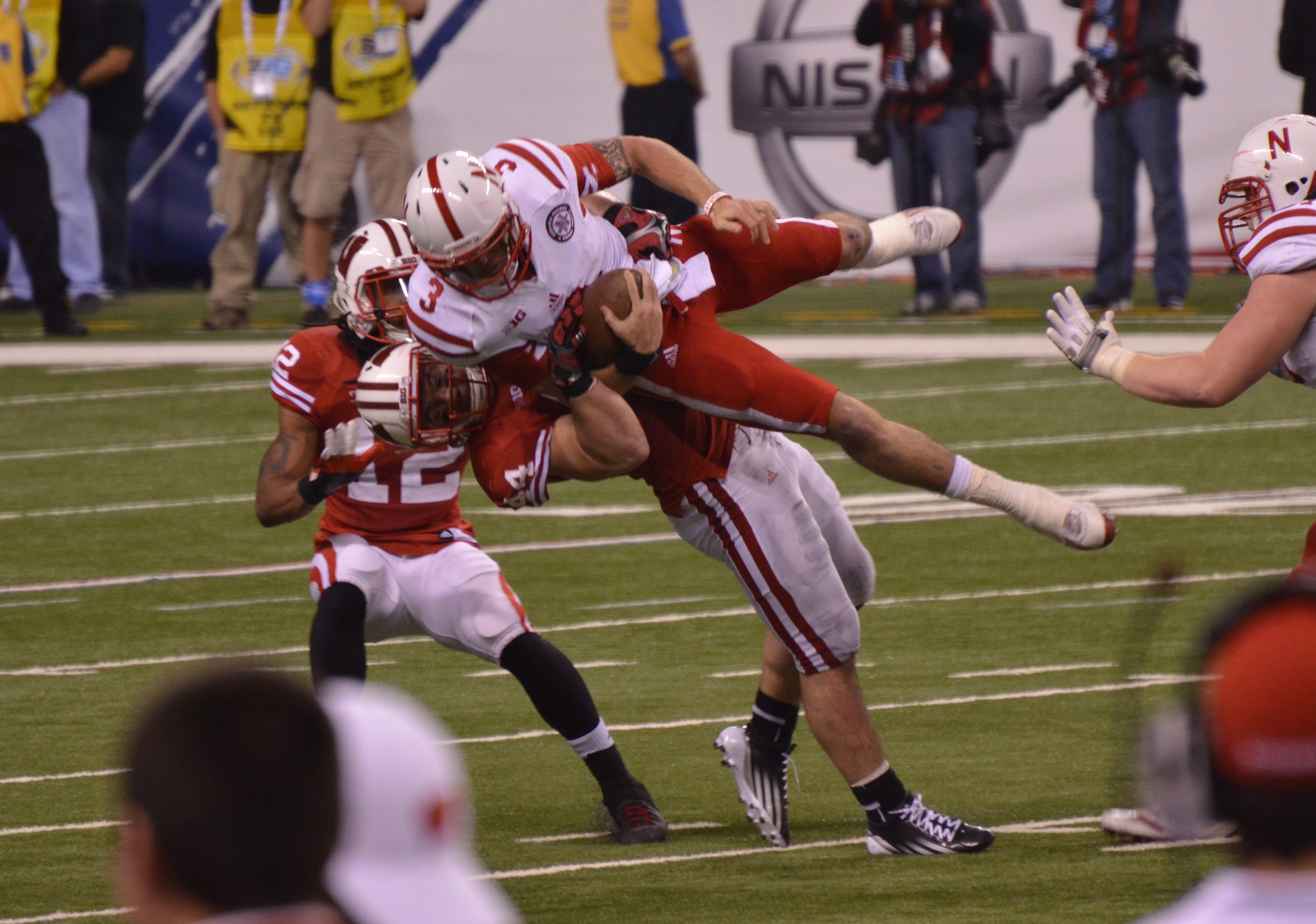
Borland tackles Taylor Martinez during the 2012 Big Ten Football Championship Game

=== 2009 ===
Borland played in 13 games, starting six. He led the team with five forced fumbles and three fumble recoveries. He finished third on the team in tackles-for-loss (10.5) and sacks (5.0) and fifth in tackles (54). Borland also returned six kickoffs for 106 yards and made three extra points in the game against Hawaii. Borland was named the Big Ten Conference's Freshman of the Year in 2009. He was also named to the Football Writers Association of America ( FWAA) Freshman All-American team.

=== 2010 ===
Borland played and started two games. He was injured in the second game of the season and missed the rest of the year with a shoulder injury. He was granted an injury redshirt for that season.

=== 2011 ===
Before the season, Borland was on the watchlist for the Butkus Award which is awarded to the nations best linebacker. He was also listed on the preseason watchlists for All-Big Ten, first-team by Phil Steele and second-team by Athlon.

On December 8, 2011, Borland was named Third-team All-American by Yahoo Sports. His teammate Russell Wilson joined him on the Third-team while Montee Ball was named to the First-team and offensive linemen Peter Konz and Kevin Zeitler were named to the Second-team.

=== 2012 ===
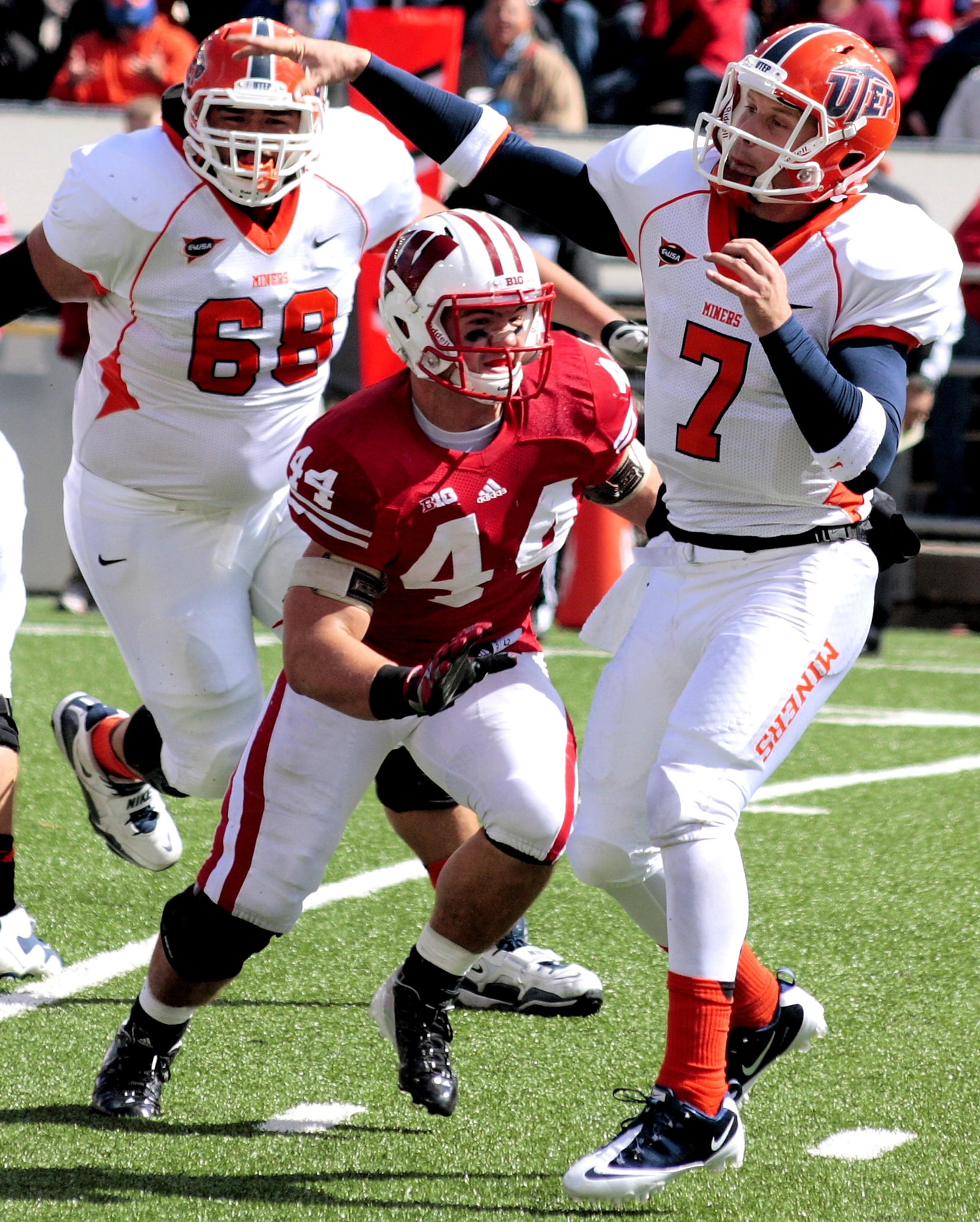
UTEP quarterback Nick Lamaison throws an incomplete pass under pressure from Borland

Borland set a season high with 13 tackles in the 2012 Big Ten Football Championship Game against Nebraska. He recorded a team-high 9 tackles in the 2013 Rose Bowl against Stanford. Following the season, Borland was named first-team All-Big Ten by the coaches and honorable mention by the media.

=== 2013 ===
Borland was named to the preseason watchlists for the Chuck Bednarik Award, Bronko Nagurski Trophy, Dick Butkus Award, Lombardi Award and Lott IMPACT Trophy. Halfway through the 2013 season ESPN ranked Borland the #4 Defensive MVP.

On November 23, Borland tied the FBS career forced fumble record, with his 14th, against Minnesota. Also in late November, he was named one of four finalists for the Lott IMPACT Trophy. Other finalists include Anthony Barr (UCLA linebacker), Devon Kennard (USC defensive end) and James Morris (Iowa linebacker).

On December 3, 2013, Borland was named Big Ten Nagurski-Woodson Defensive Player of the Year Borland is the fifth Wisconsin player to be named Defensive Player of the Year, joining Troy Vincent (1991), Tom Burke (1998), Jamar Fletcher (2000) and Erasmus James (2004). Borland was also named the Big Ten's Butkus-Fitzgerald Linebacker of the Year.

On December 18, 2013, Borland was named to the first-team All-America Team by FWAA. He also earned second-team All-America honors by the Associated Press, Athlon, CBS Sports, and Sports Illustrated.

== Professional career ==
Pre-draft measurables
Height	Weight	Arm length	Hand span	40-yard dash	10-yard split	20-yard split	20-yard shuttle	Three-cone drill	Vertical jump	Broad jump	Bench press	Wonderlic
5 ft 11 1/2 in (1.82 m)	248 lb (112 kg)	29 1/4 in (0.74 m)	9 7/8 in (0.25 m)	4.81 s	1.59 s	2.69 s	4.26 s	6.83 s	35 in (0.89 m)	9 ft 8 in (2.95 m)	27 reps	32
All values from NFL Combine/Pro Day

Borland was selected 77th overall in the 2014 NFL draft by the San Francisco 49ers. Throughout training camp and preseason, he competed against 49ers veteran Michael Wilhoite for a starting inside linebacker position left absent by the injured NaVorro Bowman.

In the last preseason game against the Houston Texans, Borland led the defense in tackles with six and returned an interception 34 yards for a touchdown.

Borland got his first career start in Week 7 against the Denver Broncos after the 49ers All-Pro inside linebacker Patrick Willis injured his toe against the St. Louis Rams during week six. He led the 49ers defense with eight tackles, one tackle for loss and he recorded his first career sack against Peyton Manning in the same game that Manning surpassed Brett Favre for most touchdown passes in NFL history. In his second start filling in for Willis, he recorded 18 tackles, 15 solo and three tackles for loss against the Rams. His 18 tackles were the most tackles for a single player league-wide and included a "suplex-like" tackle of running back Tre Mason.

In a Week 10 matchup against the New Orleans Saints, Borland recovered an overtime fumble that led the 49ers to a 27–24 victory. During the game, he recorded 17 tackles and he received his first ever NFL award, which was Pepsi NFL Rookie of the Week. In Week 11, he was named NFC Defensive Player of the Week for his performance against the Eli Manning-led New York Giants where he was the first rookie linebacker in franchise history to get two interceptions in one game. He also led the team in tackles with 13 and had three passes defended. Borland was selected as the NFL's Defensive Rookie of the Month for November. On December 20, 2014, Borland was placed on season ending injured reserve with an ankle injury. He finished his rookie season with 108 tackles, one sack, and two interceptions, despite starting only 8 games. He was named to the PFWA All-Rookie Team.

On March 16, 2015, Borland announced his retirement from the NFL citing concern of head trauma. He received a $617,436 signing bonus when he inked a four-year rookie deal with the 49ers coming out of college, but would be returning approximately three-quarters of this bonus to the team (approximately $463,077).

== Career statistics ==
=== NFL ===
				Tackles				Interceptions					Fumbles		Other	
Year	Team	G	GS	Comb	Solo	Assist	Sack	Int	Yds	Avg	Lng	TDs	FF	FR	Pass Def	Safety
2014	San Francisco 49ers	14	8	107	84	23	1.0	2	12	6.0	12	0	0	1	5	–

=== College ===
Year	Team	Solo	Ast	Total	TFL	Sack	INT	PD	FF	FR
2009	Wisconsin	36	18	54	10.5	5.0	1	3	5	3
2010	Wisconsin	5	2	7	2.0	1.0	0	0	0	0
2011	Wisconsin	64	79	143	19.0	2.5	2	7	5	0
2012	Wisconsin	56	48	104	10.0	4.5	1	6	3	3
2013	Wisconsin	72	39	111	8.5	4.0	1	2	1	2
Totals		233	187	420	50.0	17.0	5	18	14	8

== Career highlights ==
NFL

- Defensive Rookie of the Month (November 2014)
- NFC Defensive Player of the Week (Week 11, 2014)
- Pepsi NFL Rookie of the Week (Weeks 10 & 11, 2014)

College

- First-team All-America Team – FWAA (2013)
- 3× First-team All-Big Ten (2011, 2012, 2013)
- Big Ten Defensive Player of the Year (2013)
- Big Ten Linebacker of the Year (2013)
- Third-team All-American – Yahoo Sports (2011)
- Big Ten Freshman of the Year (2009)
- FWAA Freshman All-America Team (2009)
- Honorable Mention All-Big Ten (2009)
- 3× Big Ten Champion (2010, 2011, 2012)
- Division I FBS most fumbles forced, career (14)
- 4× Big Ten Defensive Player of the Week (Weeks 10 & 12 – 2011, Week 4 – 2012, Week 11 2013)
- Big Ten Conference Outstanding Sportsmanship Award (2014)
- UW Student-Athlete of the Year (2014)

== Life after football ==
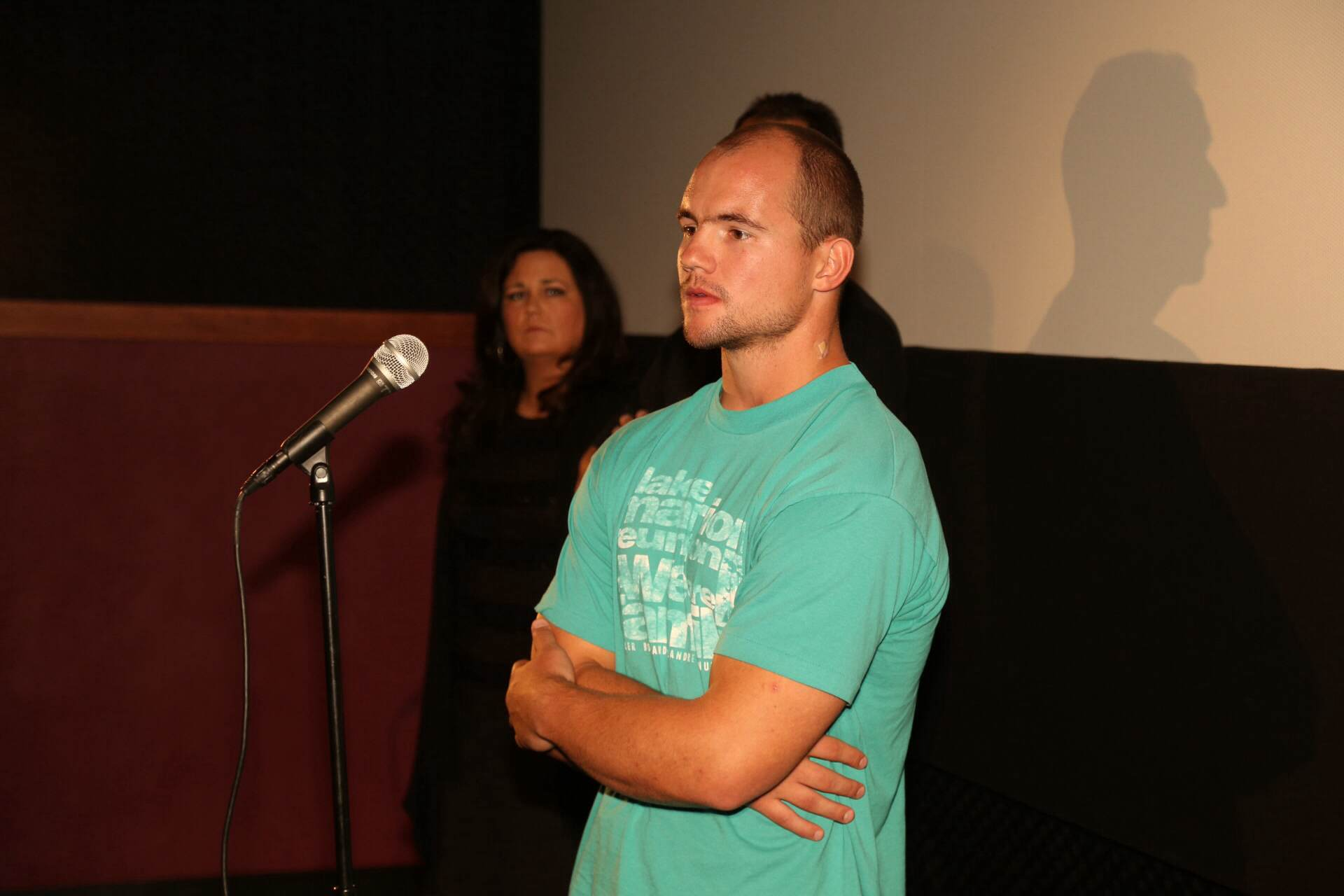
Borland attended the premier of GridIron Gladiators

Borland attended the premiere of GridIron Gladiators on April 19, 2015, in Portland, Oregon Borland has been outspoken about his decision to retire. He has received both praise and criticism for his assertions in many interviews, including one with CBS News in which he stated that he believes football as a whole to be "inherently dangerous".

In a December 2015 Frontline interview, Borland said, "Last year the NFL commissioned actuaries to estimate how many NFL veterans would have brain damage. And the number they came up with was three out of 10. So if I turn on a game, and a third of the guys will have brain damage in life, I just, I can't really support that. And, I don't really watch football anymore. If it's on, I may peek at it, but ..." He shook his head as the video faded.

Borland appeared in Episode 2 & 3 of the Netflix special three-part docuseries, Killer Inside: The Mind of Aaron Hernandez and discussed brain health in relation to football.

In 2018 he said that retiring early from football was very tough. After ESPN called him “the most dangerous man in football” for discussing the problem with concussions, he said that “I fell into a funk. I was trapped in a role I didn’t want. It was a hard couple of months.” In the same interview he said he works with the After the Impact Fund, which is a non-profit organisation focused on helping military veterans with PTSD and athletes with concussions.
