= Taylor Martinez =

American football player (born 1990)

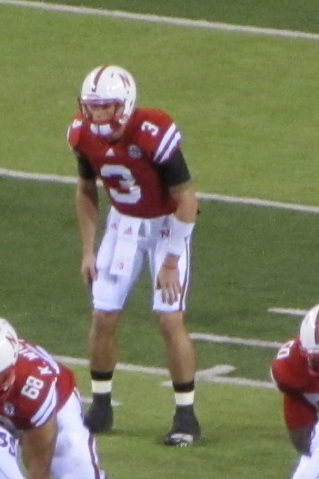
- Martinez with the Nebraska Cornhuskers in 2010

No. 3
- Position: Quarterback

Personal information
- Born: September 15, 1990 (age 36); Corona, California, U.S.
- Listed height: 6 ft 1 in (1.85 m)
- Listed weight: 210 lb (95 kg)

Career information
- High school: Centennial (Corona, California)
- College: Nebraska (2009–2013)
- NFL draft: 2014: undrafted

Career history
- Philadelphia Eagles (2014)*
- * Offseason or practice squad member only

Awards and highlights
- First-team All-Big Ten (2012); Big 12 Offensive Freshman of the Year (2010)

Taylor Todd Martinez (born September 15, 1990) is an American former college football quarterback who played for the Nebraska Cornhuskers. Following the 2014 NFL draft he signed with the Philadelphia Eagles of the National Football League (NFL) as undrafted free agent. His contract was voided prior to the season due to a failed physical because of a previous foot injury.

== Early life ==
Martinez played his senior year of high school football at Centennial High School in Corona, California, where he was a teammate of Vontaze Burfict and Will Sutton. At Centennial he passed for over 3,000 yards, including 28 touchdowns with a 61 percent pass completion. Taylor also rushed for 750 yards with 12 touchdowns. Martinez received multiple awards for his performance and led Centennial to a state championship win and a perfect season (15–0). Centennial High School finished the 2007 season with a 13–2 record and ranked 24 by USA Today. The undefeated 2008 Huskies team won a California Interscholastic Federation state championship and finished the season ranked No. 2 in the nation by USA Today.

College recruiting
Name	Hometown	School	Height	Weight	40^{‡}	Commit date
Taylor Martinez; QB	Corona, California	Centennial High School	6 ft 0 in (1.83 m)	176 lb (80 kg)	4.31	Aug 22, 2008
Taylor Martinez; QB	Recruit ratings: Scout: Rivals:					
Overall recruit ranking: Scout: 41 (QB) Rivals: 51 (ATH), 44 (CA)
‡ Refers to 40-yard dash; Note: In many cases, Scout, Rivals, 247Sports, On3, and ESPN may conflict in their listings of height, weight and 40 time.; In these cases, the average was taken. ESPN grades are on a 100-point scale.; Sources: "2009 Team Ranking". Rivals.com.

Martinez committed to the University of Nebraska–Lincoln on August 22, 2008. Martinez wasn't heavily recruited by Football Bowl Subdivision schools as the only football scholarship offer he received to play quarterback was from Nebraska.

== College career ==
=== 2009 ===
Martinez was redshirted for the entire year.

=== 2010 ===
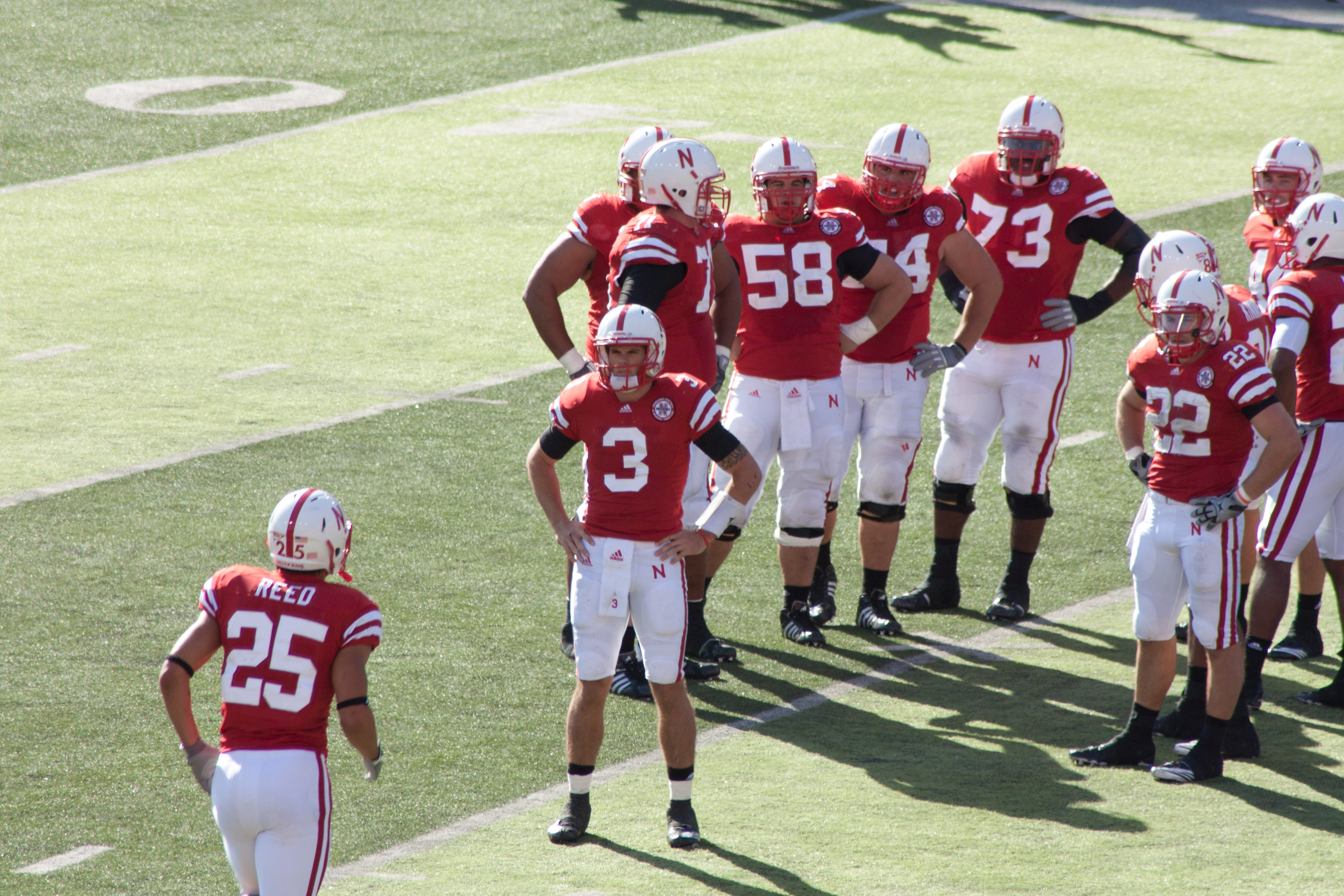
Martinez (3) during the October 16, 2010 game against Texas.

After a three-way position battle, Martinez emerged over sophomore Cody Green and senior Zac Lee for the majority of the 2010 season as the University of Nebraska's starting quarterback. In October, Martinez was named as a semi-finalist for the Davey O'Brien Award.

Three impressive performances by Martinez came on the road with games against Washington, Kansas State, and Oklahoma State. At the University of Washington on September 18, Martinez ran an 80-yard touchdown run on the Husky defense in a 56–21 Husker win. Martinez finished with three touchdowns while rushing 19 times for 137 yards and completing 7-of-11 passes for 150 yards. Against Kansas State on October 7 Martinez ran 15 times for 241 yards and completed 5-of-7 passes for 128 yards which included a 79-yard touchdown pass to Kyler Reed in the third quarter. Martinez had touchdown runs of 14, 35, 80, and 41 yards during the contest. Nebraska beat Kansas State, 48–13. His 241 yards rushing set a school record for most rushing yards in a game by a quarterback and most rushing yards in a game by a freshman. On October 23, in a 51–41 victory against the Oklahoma State Cowboys, he completed 23-of-35 passes for 323 yards that included five touchdown passes with three of those going to wide receiver Brandon Kinnie for 45, nine, and eight yards. Martinez ran 19 times for 112 yards in the contest at Stillwater, Oklahoma. He set a freshman all-time record for most passing yards and passing touchdowns in a single game for the Huskers.

In November, Martinez received the 2010 All-Big 12 Offensive Freshman of the Year award. The Cornhuskers reached the Big 12 Championship Game to face Oklahoma (12–2, ranked No. 6 nationally in the AP College Football Poll by season's end) on December 4 as they finished 6–2 in conference play and first place in the Big 12 North Division under the direction of head coach Bo Pelini. Unfortunately, a twisted ankle Martinez suffered back on October 30 in a 31–17 home win over Missouri wound up being a lingering injury. Oklahoma edged Nebraska, 23–20, as Martinez struggled to get on track while completing 12-of-24 passes for 143 yards. The Sooners defense kept the Husker ground game in check as Nebraska managed just 145 yards off 43 rushes.

Martinez finished the season completing 116-of-196 passing attempts for 1,631 yards with 10 touchdowns and seven interceptions in 13 games. The 6–1, 205-pound redshirt freshman ran 162 times for 965 yards while running forward and scoring 12 touchdowns. Nebraska went 10–4 and was ranked No. 19 and No. 20 by the Coaches and AP Polls respectively.

=== 2011 ===
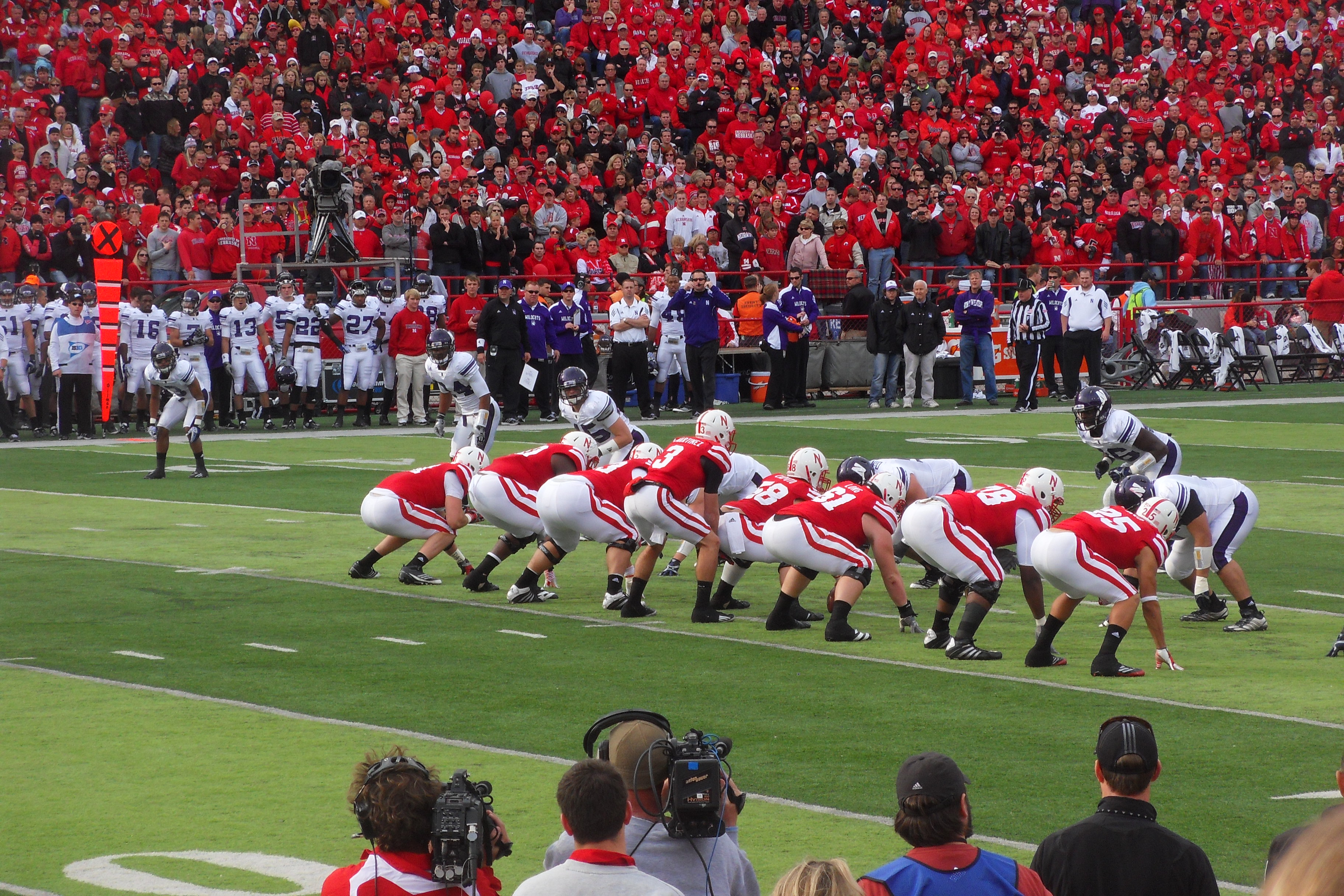
Martinez about to take a snap against Northwestern in 2011

With a preseason No. 10 ranking for the redshirt sophomore starting quarterback, Martinez responded with early season successes and a 7–1 start as the University of Nebraska joined the Big Ten for the first time in the school's history after the realignment of many conferences had changed the college football landscape—which began to take place during the summer of 2010. On October 1, Martinez and Nebraska traveled to Madison, Wis. to face AP No. 7 nationally ranked Wisconsin and quarterback, N.C. State transfer Russell Wilson. With 12:45 left to play in the 2nd quarter, Nebraska led 14–7 off 1-yard touchdown runs by Martinez and Rex Burkhead. After that, Wisconsin continued to pull away and won by the score of 48–17. Wilson finished 14-of-20 passing for 255 yards with two touchdowns. Martinez had 20 rushes for 61 yards and completed 11-of-22 passes for 176 yards against the Badgers.

Martinez and his teammates rebounded from the Wisconsin loss, however, by recording the biggest comeback win in school history as the Cornhuskers overcame a 27–6 deficit versus Ohio State. Nebraska responded with 28 unanswered points as the biggest play of the game may have been Martinez' screen pass to Burkhead who ran 30 yards into the end zone to tie the score at 27–27 with 7:35 left in the contest. Burkhead also scored the game's winning touchdown off a 17-yard run as Martinez finished the game completing 16-of-22 passes for 191 yards with two touchdowns while rushing for 102 yards off 17 carries against the Buckeyes. Martinez' best performance throwing the football in 2011 came in a 28–25 loss to Northwestern on November 5 as he completed 28-of-37 passes for 289 yards without an interception. Martinez threw touchdown passes of 15 and 14 yards. He had 53 rushing yards on 12 carries against Northwestern.

Martinez and Nebraska had their first experience in the Big Ten as they finished 5–3 in the conference. The 6–1, 200-pound redshirt sophomore led Nebraska to a 9–4 record as the Cornhuskers were nationally ranked No. 24 by the AP College Football Poll. Martinez's statistics for the season had him completing 162-of-288 passes for 2,089 yards with 13 touchdowns and eight interceptions. The spread option quarterback ran the ball 188 times for 874 rushing yards and scored nine touchdowns in 13 games. Martinez's Cornhuskers were invited to play the nationally ranked No. 10 South Carolina Gamecocks (10–2) in the Capital One-Citrus Bowl on January 2, 2012, in Orlando, Florida. Nebraska lost the game, 30–13.

=== 2012 ===
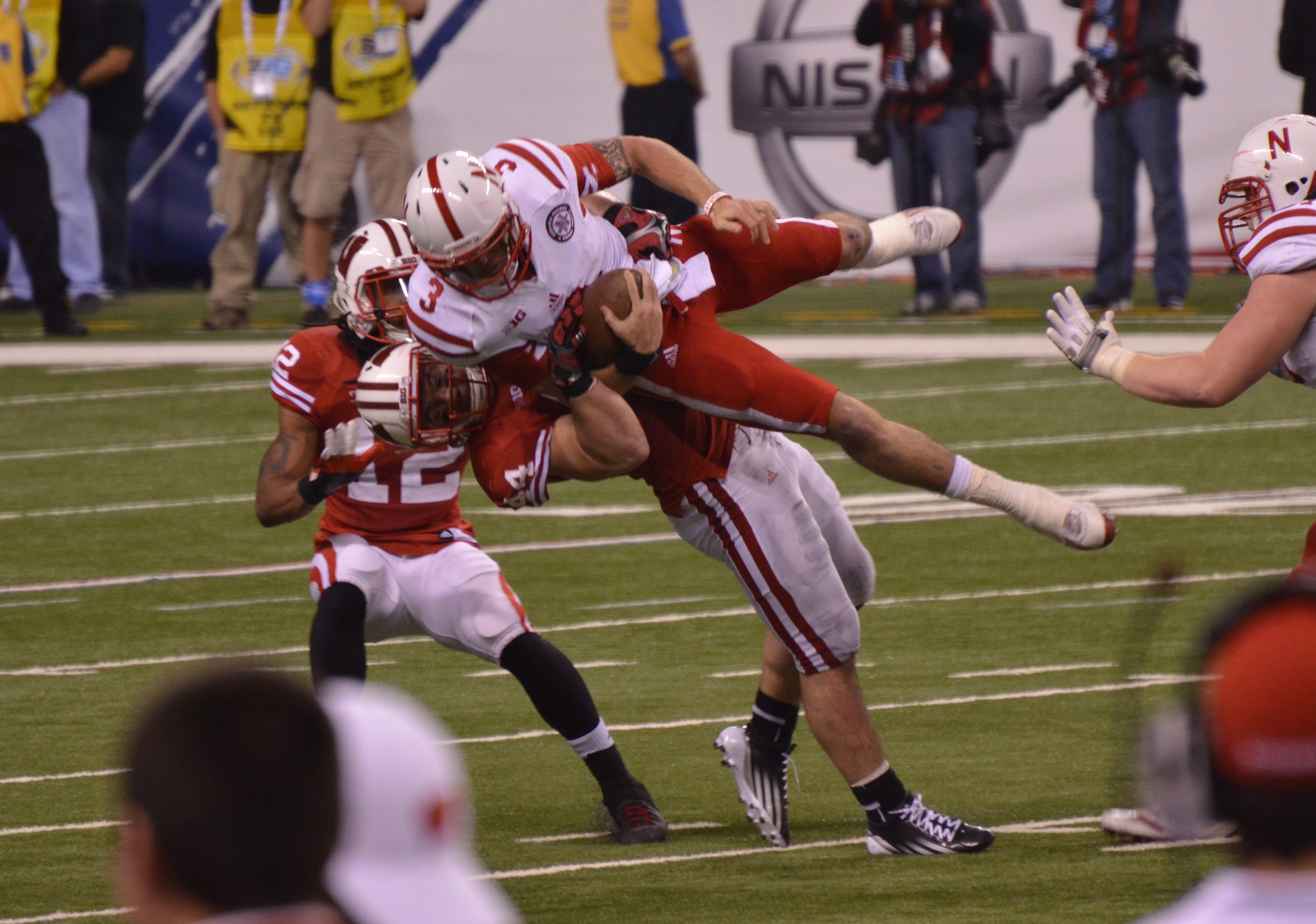
Wisconsin linebacker Chris Borland tackles Martinez in the 2012 Big Ten Football Championship Game

Leading up to the 2012 season, Martinez was heavily criticized by fans and media for his awkward passing motion and tendency to turn the ball over. During the spring and summer of 2012, Martinez spent time working on his throwing motion with Steve Calhoun, a private quarterback's coach that operates a football camp in California called "Armed and Dangerous." Calhoun was known for his work with college quarterbacks, and had helped prepare some college quarterbacks for the NFL, including Cam Newton and Jake Locker. Although Martinez had only completed 56% of his passes in 2011, he was confident that his second season as quarterback for in Tim Beck's offense would be better. When asked if he had a completion rate goal for 2012, Martinez responded "70 percent or above."

The season opener against Southern Mississippi ended up being a showcase for Martinez's improvement over the spring and summer. Martinez went 26/34 passing with 5 touchdowns and no interceptions and lead Huskers to a 49–20 win. His throwing motion improved and no longer appeared to be an issue. In the game against Wisconsin defensive end David Gilbert wasn't convinced of Martinez' improvement. When asked he said, "It still looks like he’s skipping rocks out there to me... He still can’t throw. I’m just going to say it. He still can’t throw. He’s not going to beat us with his arm." Martinez led scoring drives on 5 of Nebraska's last 6 possessions to take a 30–27 lead late in the 4th quarter—which ended up being the final score. Martinez accounted for all 4 of Nebraska's touchdowns, throwing for 2 and running for 2 more. The victory was Nebraska's 2nd largest comeback in school history, 2nd only to the 21 point comeback win against Ohio State the season before (also featuring Martinez at QB).

One of Martinez's best games of 2012 came at Michigan State on November 3. Michigan State was 5–4 heading into the game, but featured the best defense statistically in college football at that point in the season, including the best run defense in the Big Ten. Martinez ended the day with the second best rushing performance of his career with 205 yards on 17 carries. Despite throwing 3 interceptions, Martinez was able to make important throws late in the game. Down by 3 with no timeouts and only 1:20 left, Martinez led an 80-yard drive that included a 38-yard completion to Kyler Reed on 4th and 10 at the Nebraska 40-yard line, and the game-winning touchdown pass to sophomore WR Jamal Turner with :06 seconds left. Martinez received Player of the Week honors in the Big Ten for his performance. During the game, Martinez passed former Heisman winner Eric Crouch as the all-time leader in total yardage at Nebraska.

Martinez helped lead another comeback the following week against Penn State, where he rushed for 105 yards and threw for 171 more with 2 touchdowns and no interceptions. Martinez had another fine passing performance in the next game against Minnesota when he completed 72% of his passes for 302 yards and 2 touchdowns with no interceptions.

Nebraska finished the regular season at 10–2, and headed to the Big Ten championship for a rematch with unranked, 7–5 Wisconsin. Nebraska was a 10-point favorite heading into the game. However, a bad defensive performance by the Cornhuskers led to a 70–31 loss. After the loss, the Huskers went on to lose to #7 ranked Georgia in the Capital One Bowl 45–31. Martinez threw for 204 yards and 2 touchdowns, with 2 interceptions (including a late-game desperation throw).

The 2012 Cornhuskers finished the season at 10–4 and Nebraska was ranked No. 25 in the final AP Top 25 Poll. Martinez improved statistically, and had nearly 800 more passing yards, 10 more touchdowns, and a 6% higher completion rate than the season before. He also rushed for more than 1,000 yards in a season for the first time in his career. Although he fell short of his 70% completion goal, it was clear that he had improved his passing while still being a major threat running the ball.

Martinez had broken many QB records at Nebraska and headed into the 2013 season as one of the top dual threat QBs in the country. Many sports analysts thought that if he continued to work with Steve Calhoun to improve his passing game in the offseason, he could have been a Heisman trophy candidate in 2013 barring injury.

=== 2013 ===
Martinez suffered a debilitating injury close to the ball of his left foot affecting the second and third toes. The injury occurred during the first week of the season against Wyoming. The specifics of Martinez' 2013 injury were revealed in January as a "...plantar plate tear of the second metatarsal phalangeal joint." The injury occurred on a running play in the middle of the fourth quarter during the Wyoming game and was aggravated during the Southern Miss game. He played again in the UCLA game, but the pain came back during the second half. The last game of his collegiate career was against Minnesota (a 34–23 loss). Playing aggravated the injury. It was reported in November recovery would not be full until February or March 2014.

=== Statistics ===
Season	Passing							Rushing			
Season	Cmp	Att	Pct	Yds	TD	Int	Rtg	Att	Yds	Avg	TD
2009	Redshirted										
2010	116	196	59.2	1,631	10	7	138.8	162	965	6.0	12
2011	162	288	56.3	2,089	13	8	126.5	189	874	4.6	9
2012	228	368	62.0	2,871	23	12	141.6	195	1,019	5.2	10
2013	69	110	62.7	667	10	2	140.0	40	117	2.9	0
Totals	575	962	59.8	7,258	56	29	136.3	586	2,975	5.1	31

== Professional career ==
Martinez signed with the Philadelphia Eagles on May 12, 2014, as an undrafted rookie free agent. The Eagles already had Nick Foles, Mark Sanchez and Matt Barkley on their roster, but the team reportedly planned to use Martinez as a wide receiver or defensive back. However, he failed his physical, and his contract was voided two days later.
