= Marcus Cromartie =

American football player (born 1990)

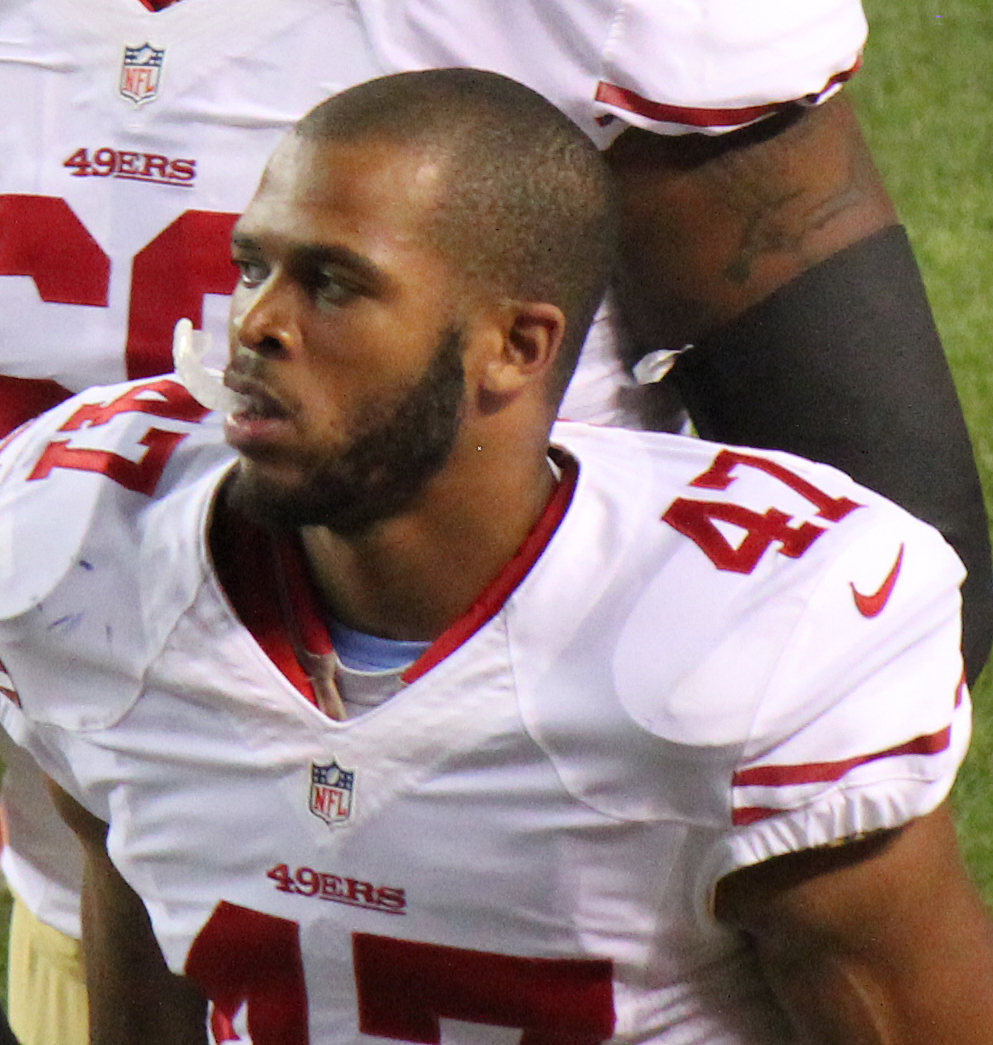
- Cromartie with the San Francisco 49ers in 2015

No. 47, 20, 36
- Position: Cornerback

Personal information
- Born: December 3, 1990 (age 35); New Orleans, Louisiana, U.S.
- Listed height: 6 ft 0 in (1.83 m)
- Listed weight: 195 lb (88 kg)

Career information
- High school: Mansfield Timberview (Arlington, Texas)
- College: Wisconsin
- NFL draft: 2013: undrafted

Career history
- San Diego Chargers (2013–2014); Cleveland Browns (2014)*; San Francisco 49ers (2014–2016); Buffalo Bills (2017)*; Seattle Seahawks (2017); Houston Texans (2017); Detroit Lions (2018); Montreal Alouettes (2019)
- * Offseason or practice squad member only

Career NFL statistics
- Total tackles: 21
- Fumble recoveries: 1
- Pass deflections: 3
- Stats at Pro Football Reference

Marcus A. Cromartie (born December 3, 1990) is an American former professional football player who was a cornerback in the National Football League (NFL). He played college football for the Wisconsin Badgers, and signed with the San Diego Chargers as an undrafted free agent in 2013.

== Early life ==
Cromartie ranked as the 43rd best defensive back prospect in the nation by Rivals.com along with 57th best prospect by Scout.com. He was among the Top 100 players in the state of Texas. He was selected to the PrepTicket all-state team and also was a Texashsfootball.com honorable mention all-state team. He was named to second-team all-district in his junior season. He was selected to the first-team all-district and all-area team in his senior season in high school. Cromartie attended Mansfield Timberview High School in Arlington, Texas.

== Professional career ==
Pre-draft measurables
| Height | Weight | Arm length | Hand span | 40-yard dash | 10-yard split | 20-yard split | 20-yard shuttle | Three-cone drill | Vertical jump | Broad jump | Bench press |
|---|---|---|---|---|---|---|---|---|---|---|---|
| 6 ft 0 in (1.83 m) | 195 lb (88 kg) | 33 3/8 in (0.85 m) | 9 1/2 in (0.24 m) | 4.41 s | 1.57 s | 2.55 s | 4.19 s | 6.85 s | 34.0 in (0.86 m) | 10 ft 1 in (3.07 m) | 14 reps |
All values from Pro Day

=== San Diego Chargers ===
On April 27, 2013, Cromartie signed with the San Diego Chargers as an undrafted free agent. On December 16, 2013, he was promoted to the active roster.

=== Cleveland Browns ===
On October 29, 2014, Cromartie was signed to the Cleveland Browns' practice squad but was released the next day.

=== San Francisco 49ers ===
On November 18, 2014, Cromartie was signed to the San Francisco 49ers' practice squad. On September 5, 2015, he was released by the 49ers during final roster cuts and was signed to the practice squad the next day. After cornerbacks Tramaine Brock and Kenneth Acker sustained injuries, Cromartie was promoted to the active roster and made his first start of 2015 on November 8, 2015, against the Falcons, recording seven tackles. He appeared in eight games in 2015, recording 12 tackles and two pass deflections.

=== Buffalo Bills ===
On April 7, 2017, Cromartie signed with the Buffalo Bills. On May 11, 2017, he was waived by the Bills.

=== Seattle Seahawks ===
On May 31, 2017, Cromartie was signed by the Seattle Seahawks. He was placed on injured reserve on September 2, 2017. He was released on September 11, 2017.

=== Houston Texans ===
On October 4, 2017, Cromartie was signed by the Houston Texans. He was released on October 14, 2017.

=== Detroit Lions ===
On August 19, 2018, Cromartie signed with the Detroit Lions. He was placed on injured reserve on August 31, 2018. He was released on September 18, 2018.

=== Montreal Alouettes ===
In April 2019, Cromartie signed with the Montreal Alouettes of the CFL. In the first game of the season, Cromartie recorded seven tackles, and recovered a fumble that was forced by teammate Tommie Campbell. However this was his only game; Cromartie suffered an injury and was placed on the 6 game injured list. After recovering and coming off the list, he was released on August 7.

== Personal life ==
He is a cousin of former NFL cornerbacks Dominique Rodgers-Cromartie and Antonio Cromartie.

After football, Cromartie transitioned to a career as a sports agent, currently working for Equity Sports. He was involved in a name, image, and likeness compensation (NIL) controversy after former UNLV quarterback Matthew Sluka elected to redshirt the rest of the 2024 season due to alleged NIL promises not being kept. According to Cromartie, a verbal agreement was made on financial terms that would pay Sluka $100,000 to transfer to UNLV, but no money was paid, but Brennan Marion didn’t keep his word.
