= Josh Malone =

American football player (born 1996)

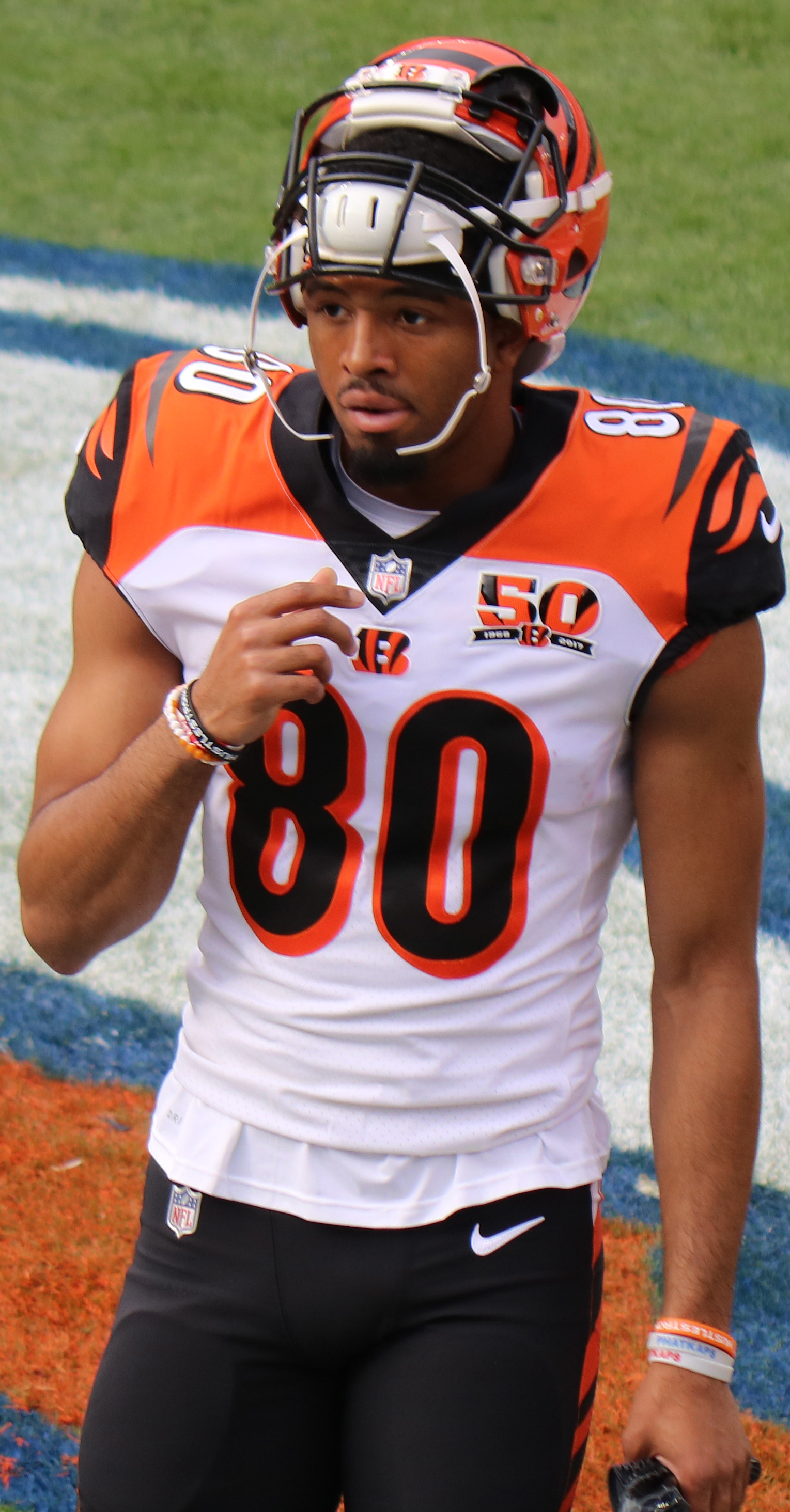
- Malone with the Cincinnati Bengals in 2017

No. 80, 83
- Position: Wide receiver

Personal information
- Born: March 21, 1996 (age 30); Chattanooga, Tennessee, U.S.
- Listed height: 6 ft 3 in (1.91 m)
- Listed weight: 205 lb (93 kg)

Career information
- High school: Station Camp (Gallatin, Tennessee)
- College: Tennessee
- NFL draft: 2017: 4th round, 128th overall pick

Career history
- Cincinnati Bengals (2017–2018); New York Jets (2019–2020); Denver Broncos (2021)*; Green Bay Packers (2021)*; Tennessee Titans (2022)*; Pittsburgh Steelers (2022)*; DC Defenders (2023)
- * Offseason or practice squad member only

Career NFL statistics
- Receptions: 11
- Receiving yards: 91
- Receiving touchdowns: 1
- Stats at Pro Football Reference

Joshua Khiry Malone (born March 21, 1996) is an American former professional football player who was a wide receiver in the National Football League (NFL). He played college football for the Tennessee Volunteers. He played for the Cincinnati Bengals and New York Jets of the NFL and the DC Defenders of the XFL.

== Early life ==
Malone attended Station Camp High School in Gallatin, Tennessee, where he played high school football for the Bison. He had a successful high school career at Station Camp. As a junior in 2012, he had 28 receptions for 408 yards and five touchdowns. In addition, he had 15 rushes for 101 yards and a rushing touchdown. He had numerous accomplishments during his senior season in 2013. He had 71 receptions for 1,404 yards and 19 receiving touchdowns and 23 rushes for 227 yards and three rushing touchdowns during his senior season. His successful senior season warranted an invitation to play in the 2014 U.S. Army All-American Game.

== College career ==
Before the 2014 college football season, Malone committed to play for the University of Tennessee under head coach Butch Jones.

In 2014, as a true freshman, Malone played in all 12 regular season games and the 2015 TaxSlayer Bowl against Iowa. He made his collegiate debut against Utah State on August 31 at Neyland Stadium. In his collegiate debut, he had two receptions for 26 yards. Against Southeastern Conference (SEC) East rival Georgia on September 27, he had five receptions for 43 yards and a 20-yard rush in the loss at Sanford Stadium. Against Ole Miss, he had a season-high 75 yards on five receptions at Vaught-Hemingway Stadium. He had his first career touchdown against Alabama in their annual rivalry game on October 25 at home. In the 2014 season, Malone had 23 receptions for 201 yards and a touchdown.

In his sophomore season in 2015, Malone played in all 12 regular season games and the 2016 Outback Bowl against Northwestern. He started twelve games for the Volunteers. In the home opener, Malone had his first touchdown of the season in a 2OT loss to the Oklahoma Sooners. On October 10, he led the Vols in catches in their upset 38–31 victory over #19 Georgia at Neyland Stadium. He had his first career game with over 100 receiving yards at Kentucky at Commonwealth Stadium. In the game, he had a career-long 75-yard touchdown reception from quarterback Joshua Dobbs. He finished third on the team with 31 catches for 405 yards and two touchdowns.

In his junior season in 2016, Malone appeared in all 12 regular season games and the bowl game. He had a 67-yard receiving touchdown in the season opening 20–13 overtime victory against Appalachian State on September 1. In the 2016 Pilot Flying J Battle at Bristol against Virginia Tech, he had two receptions for 46 yards and a touchdown. Against the Ohio Bobcats the following week, he had five receptions for 69 yards and two touchdowns. He had four catches for 91 yards and a 42-yard touchdown in the 38–28 win against SEC East Rival Florida on September 24. On November 5, against the Tennessee Tech Golden Eagles, he had five receptions for 112 yards and two touchdowns. He had a career-high 121 receiving yards and one touchdown at Vanderbilt on November 26. In his final game with the Volunteers, he had five receptions for 120 yards and one touchdown in the 2016 Music City Bowl victory over Nebraska on December 30. In the 2016 season, he finished third in the SEC in receiving yards and touchdowns, with 972 and 11, respectively.

After the 2016 season, Malone declared his intentions to enter the 2017 NFL draft.

=== College statistics ===
Season	Team	GP	Receiving				Rushing			
Season	Team	GP	Rec	Yds	Avg	TD	Att	Yds	Avg	TD
2014	Tennessee	13	23	231	10.0	1	2	11	5.5	0
2015	Tennessee	13	31	405	13.1	2	0	0	0.0	0
2016	Tennessee	13	50	972	19.4	11	0	0	0.0	0
Total		39	104	1,608	15.5	14	2	11	5.5	0

== Professional career ==
=== Pre-draft ===
Coming out of Tennessee, Malone was projected to be a third round pick by the majority of NFL draft experts and scouts. He received an invitation to the NFL Combine and completed all of the required combine and positional drills. On March 31, 2017, Malone participated at Tennessee's pro day, along with Joshua Dobbs, Alvin Kamara, Cameron Sutton, Jalen Reeves-Maybin, Derek Barnett, Jason Croom, former Saint's wide receiver Robert Meachem, and 17 other prospects. Around 100 scouts and team representatives from all 32 NFL teams attended, including Pittsburgh Steelers head coach Mike Tomlin, as Malone performed all of the combine and positional drills. He was ranked the 12th best wide receiver prospect in the draft by NFLDraftScout.com.

Pre-draft measurables
Height	Weight	Arm length	Hand span	40-yard dash	10-yard split	20-yard split	20-yard shuttle	Three-cone drill	Vertical jump	Broad jump	Bench press
6 ft 2 3/4 in (1.90 m)	208 lb (94 kg)	31 3/8 in (0.80 m)	9 5/8 in (0.24 m)	4.40 s	1.56 s	2.61 s	4.19 s	7.05 s	30 1/2 in (0.77 m)	10 ft 1 in (3.07 m)	10 reps
All values from NFL Combine

=== Cincinnati Bengals ===
The Cincinnati Bengals selected Malone in the fourth round (128th overall) of the 2017 NFL Draft. He was the 18th wide receiver and the fifth of six Tennessee Volunteers to be selected in the 2017 NFL Draft. On May 17, 2017, the Bengals signed him to a four-year, $2.99 million contract with a signing bonus of $599,241.

He joined a deep wide receiver group with the Bengals and competed with John Ross, Brandon LaFell, Tyler Boyd, and Cody Core throughout training camp for a job as the starting wide receiver. Head coach Marvin Lewis named Malone the fifth wide receiver on the Bengals' depth chart behind A. J. Green, Brandon LaFell, Cody Core, and Tyler Boyd.

Although Malone was healthy, he was inactive for the first five games of the 2017 season. On October 22, 2017, he made his professional regular season debut during a 29–14 loss to the Steelers. The following week, Malone caught two receptions for 35-yards and scored his first career touchdown on a 25-yard pass from Andy Dalton during a 24–23 victory over the Indianapolis Colts.

On September 1, 2019, Malone was waived by the Bengals.

=== New York Jets ===
On September 4, 2019, Malone was signed to the practice squad of the New York Jets. He was promoted to the active roster on December 19, 2019.

On September 5, 2020, Malone was waived by the Jets and signed to the practice squad the next day. He was elevated to the active roster on September 12 for the team's week 1 game against the Buffalo Bills and reverted to the practice squad on September 14. He was again elevated to the active roster on September 19 for the team's week 2 game against the San Francisco 49ers and reverted to the practice squad on September 21. He was promoted to the active roster on September 22, 2020. He was waived on October 10, and re-signed to the practice squad three days later. He signed a reserve/future contract with the Jets on January 4, 2021.

On August 24, 2021, Malone was waived by the Jets.

=== Denver Broncos ===
On October 5, 2021, Malone was signed to the Denver Broncos practice squad. He was released on October 12.

=== Green Bay Packers ===
On December 14, 2021, Malone was signed to the Green Bay Packers practice squad. His contract expired when the teams season ended on January 22, 2022.

=== Tennessee Titans ===
On February 22, 2022, Malone signed with the Tennessee Titans. He was released on August 16, 2022.

=== Pittsburgh Steelers ===
On October 18, 2022, Malone signed with the Steelers practice-squad. He was released on October 29, 2022. He signed back with the practice squad on November 8, 2022, then released on November 29.

=== DC Defenders ===
On February 3, 2023, Malone was signed by the DC Defenders of the XFL. He was released on March 15, 2023.

== Personal life ==
Josh is the son of Rebecca and Cordell Malone.
