= 2014 Tennessee Volunteers football team =

American college football season

2014 Tennessee Volunteers football

TaxSlayer Bowl champion

TaxSlayer Bowl, W 45–28 vs. Iowa
- Conference: Southeastern Conference
- Eastern Division
- Record: 7–6 (3–5 SEC)
- Head coach: Butch Jones (2nd season)
- Offensive coordinator: Mike Bajakian (2nd season)
- Offensive scheme: Multiple
- Defensive coordinator: John Jancek (2nd season)
- Base defense: 4–3
- Home stadium: Neyland Stadium

2014 Southeastern Conference football standings
	Conf.			Overall
Team	W		L	W		L
Eastern Division
No. 14 Missouri x	7	–	1	11	–	3
No. 9 Georgia	6	–	2	10	–	3
Florida	4	–	4	7	–	5
Tennessee	3	–	5	7	–	6
South Carolina	3	–	5	7	–	6
Kentucky	2	–	6	5	–	7
Vanderbilt	0	–	8	3	–	9
Western Division
No. 4 Alabama x$^	7	–	1	12	–	2
No. 11 Mississippi State	6	–	2	10	–	3
No. 17 Ole Miss *	5	–	3	9	–	4
No. 22 Auburn	4	–	4	8	–	5
LSU *	4	–	4	8	–	5
Texas A&M	3	–	5	8	–	5
Arkansas	2	–	6	7	–	6
Championship: Alabama 42, Missouri 13
^ – College Football Playoff participant; $ – Conference champion; x – Division champion/co-champions; * LSU and Ole Miss vacated all wins (except for Ole Miss' win over Presbyterian) due to NCAA violations.; Rankings from AP Poll

The 2014 Tennessee Volunteers football team represented the University of Tennessee in the 2014 NCAA Division I FBS football season. This was the 118th overall season, 81st as a member of the Southeastern Conference (SEC), and its 23rd within the SEC Eastern Division. The team was coached by Butch Jones in his second season with Tennessee, and played its home games at Neyland Stadium in Knoxville.

The Vols finished the regular season at 6–6, 3–5 in the SEC, making them bowl-eligible for the first time since 2010. On December 7, 2014, it was announced that the Vols would face the Iowa Hawkeyes (7–5) in the TaxSlayer Bowl in Jacksonville, Florida, on January 2, 2015. In that game, the Vols, with Joshua Dobbs leading the team as the quarterback, struck quickly and hammered away at the Hawkeyes to secure a 45–28 win, marking Tennessee's first winning season since 2009. The bowl victory was the Vols' first since 2007.

== Before the season ==
Tennessee has 11 starters returning from the 2013 season. All five starting offensive linemen from last season are gone, as are the top five tacklers from the defensive line.

After missing the 2013 season, outside linebacker Curt Maggitt will be back on the field playing various roles. He led the team in 2012 with five tackles for loss and 2.5 sacks before tearing his ACL, which kept him off the field last season.

Bobby Denton, longtime PA announcer at Neyland Stadium, died on April 9 at the age of 73 after battling cancer for a year. Jeff Jarnigan, the PA announcer for Tennessee's basketball games, was named the new PA announcer for football games on July 17.

=== Spring practice ===
Tennessee began Spring football practice on March 7 and played their annual Orange-and-White Game on April 12. They were without star wide receiver Pig Howard for unspecified personal reasons. Reserve defensive lineman Gregory Clark, who was a fifth-year senior, left the team in the offseason to focus on his postgraduate career. Wide receivers Drae Bowles and Ryan Jenkins, tight end Brendan Downs, safety Brian Randolph, and defensive lineman Trevarris Saulsberry did not participate so that they could recover from injuries.

Marlin Lane was expected to be limited on reps through spring practice with a broken bone in his hand and that highly recruited running back Jalen Hurd would see an increased workload. This was not the case however as Lane was carrying most of the first-team reps in practice. Josh Malone, also a highly recruited wide receiver, competed with Jason Croom for the starting spot in the outside receiver slot opposite of Marquez North.

With the graduation of Michael Palardy, Tennessee was in need of a new kicker and punter. Matt Darr is expected to take over as punter. George Bullock is in line to handle kicking.

Defensive tackle Jason Carr and defensive end Malik Brown were both expected to sit out of spring practice for wrist injuries. But Jason returned to practice on April 2 while Malik remained sidelined. Coach Jones considered moving Jason Carr from defensive tackle to offensive tackle.

The battle for the starting spot at quarterback showed no clear frontrunners through most of spring practice. Justin Worley, who won the starting job last August, lost his starting spot against Florida in week 4 (he ended up subbing in for Nathan Peterman). After being knocked out of the week 8 game against Alabama, then redshirted freshman Joshua Dobbs took over the starting role for the rest of the 2013 season. In the final week of practice, Worley and Ferguson emerged as the frontrunners for the starting job. Justin Worley is most likely to retake the starting spot at quarterback.

Senior cornerback Justin Coleman played the nickel back role this spring and is expected to lineup as the fifth defensive back this season.

Coach Jones challenged his 'soft' defense to toughen up during spring practice along with reiterating themes of "fundamental improvement" and "competing all day".

Devrin Young, after playing a season as slot receiver, returned to the running back position during spring practice.

==== Spring game ====
Tennessee played the Orange and White Game on April 12. Coach Butch Jones said that the offense had made great strides from where they started at the beginning of spring practice. Jones, however, made note that the defense was still deficient overall.

In his first action since tearing his ACL in 2012, Curt Maggitt finished the game with three tackles and one sack. He played defensive end in nickel situations and at outside linebacker during base packages.

Jalen Hurd, highly recruited running back, got a chance to show his ability when he carried the ball for 66 yards rushing and one touchdown carry. He also caught a pass for 27 yards. "Jalen has been pretty much doing that all spring", Jones said. "You can see he adds a whole other dynamic to our offense. I said it in the offseason: We have to be able to throw a 5-yard pass and turn it into a 20-yard gain. That was missing from our offense last year, and we've really helped ourselves in recruiting. Jalen has been an individual that, right from practice one, he can be as good as he wants to be."

Jalen Reeves-Maybin finished second on the team with seven tackles and 0.5 tackles for loss at outside linebacker.

Joshua Dobbs, who started the final four games last season in place of Justin Worley, was not in contention for the starting job at QB. He completed six passes for 199 yards and three touchdowns and took a low, bounced snap off the ground and rumbled 59 yards for another touchdown. "Josh has had a productive spring, but I thought he really stepped it up today", coach Butch Jones said. Though all that action came against mostly reserves, Dobbs' had noticeable muscle gain and sheer arm strength on deep balls.

Justin Worley, who is expected to be the starting quarterback when the season starts, finished the game 11–13 and 151 yards passing along with one touchdown. He also had 55 yards rushing on two carries.

Marquez North was one of Tennessee's wide receivers during the season. In the game, he recorded 106 receiving yards, including a 50-yard touchdown reception.

Rivals with Vanderbilt, Josh Malone showed why he was a highly touted recruit immediately with 181 receiving yards on six catches and three touchdowns, the longest of which was 79 yards. The pass-catcher had been improving throughout the spring and dominated defenders when he got the ball which led to him starting against Vanderbilt.

In 2013, Tennessee finished 11th in total defense in the SEC (418.4 YPG) and the spring game showed that the defense was dealing with the same problems such as tackling. This was something that Butch Jones had spent a chunk of time during spring practice to work on.

=== Post spring practice ===
On April 22, reserve running back Alden Hill announced that he was leaving the team. "As of today I am I’m sad to say I am no longer a Tennessee Vol. I have decided to move on for my best interest and find a new home. I have loved Tennessee and the entire Big Orange family. I thank the coaches and the fans for my time here and will always remember my time spent at Tennessee, my first true love," Alden said via his Instagram account. He tweeted a link to the post. Although his Twitter account is unverified, head coach Butch Jones confirmed that Hill had left the team and was looking to transfer to another school.

On April 30, fifth-year defensive back JaRon Toney announced that he was leaving the team. Coach Jones said Toney would graduate in the summer and planned to pursue his professional non-football career. "I'm very excited for him getting his college degree, and I'm very appreciative of everything he's done for Tennessee", Jones said Wednesday.

On May 6, lineman Jason Carr announced that he was leaving the program and transferring to another school. Carr played defensive tackle last season for the Vols but was moved to offensive tackle after this spring and was expected to practice at that position this summer.

In a May 14 interview with the Chattanooga Times Free Press, coach Jones told Patrick Brown that Pig Howard, who didn't participate in spring practice for unspecified personal reasons, would be back with the team for the team's summer workout program on the condition of meeting school requirements. "He's in here in mini-term, so he's here", Jones said. "When we start our official summer strength and conditioning program he will be a part of it. He still has certain stipulations and requirements that must be met for him. It'll be ongoing throughout the summer months. A lot of it is laid out upon our player staff, but up until this point in time right now, he's done everything that's been required of him." On July 15, Butch Jones announced that Pig Howard was officially back on the team.

On May 27, Riley Ferguson announced that he would transfer to another school according to coach Jones. "As of right now, based on our recent conversations, we do not anticipate that he will be a member of our football family moving forward," Jones said. He was expected to battle Justin Worley and sophomore Joshua Dobbs for the starting spot throughout summer and into fall after redshirting last season following a stress fracture in his right leg. "I'm not sure how much this helps or hurts Tennessee", GoVols247's Wes Rucker said in an interview with Bleacher Report. "I think Ferguson had the most upside of Tennessee's four quarterbacks, but he was arguably the least consistent. "I thought before this came out that Justin Worley was the starter going into the season, and obviously, this news doesn't change that. I think this potentially creates more long-term questions than short-term questions."

=== Summer months ===
On June 2, coach Jones confirmed that redshirt freshman Malik Brown would transfer from Tennessee.

Incoming freshman Charles Mosley suffered a broken leg in a July 6 car crash. He was traveling back to the university campus with family at the time. He underwent tibia surgery later that night. Mosley was in good condition following the surgery according to associate athletic director Jimmy Stanton. However, coach Jones announced that he would miss the season as a result of his injuries. "We don't anticipate him being back for this year", Jones said following UT's second preseason practice Saturday at Haslam Field."He's been back since reporting day, so he's getting the rehabilitation that he needs", Jones said. "He's still around the meetings, so it's great because, again, he's another Von Pearson. He's always up. He's always positive. And to be able to have him around our team is very, very good — good for him and good for the team, as well."

On July 7, the Maxwell Football Club released an official list of college football players who are considered frontrunners for the annual Chuck Bednarik Award, given to the best defensive player. Tennessee linebacker A. J. Johnson was named to the list. Johnson was also named to the watch list for the Bronko Nagurski Trophy, which is also given to the best defensive player, the Butkus Award that's given to the top linebacker and the Rotary Lombardi Award that's given to the best lineman or linebacker.

==== SEC Media Days ====
On day two of SEC Media Days, Butch Jones took the podium to make it clear that his team is very optimistic about the upcoming season. "Obviously, it's an exciting time of year right now," Butch Jones said Tuesday. "Everyone starts at 0–0." He also noted that no teams are ever alike when comparing the current squad to the previous season's squad and that Tennessee has had enough of losing. "I think the whole dynamic of our football program has changed," Jones said. "From a work capacity, from a mentality, from a passion to represent the University of Tennessee, we had some great seniors last year and are very indebted to them, but overall as an organization, losing is a disease. We’ve been sick, we’ve been ill, and we’re working to get over those ills. This football team has worked exceptionally hard, and they have a great competitive component about them." A. J. Johnson also took the podium on day two. "I know we’re going to turn it around," senior linebacker A.J. Johnson said. "We were a couple plays away, a couple inches away last year. We’re going to better ourselves this season, so it's going to turn around. I didn’t come back for my senior season to not win." When asked how Tennessee plans to replace interior lines and how the highly touted freshman class will respond, coach Jones said that the great thing about the SEC is that it's so talented and anybody is capable of winning.

On day four of SEC Media Days, senior linebacker A. J. Johnson was named to the Preseason All-SEC First Team and sophomore wide receiver Marquez North was named to the Preseason All-SEC Third Team. Tennessee was picked to finish fifth in the SEC Eastern Division while South Carolina was picked to win the East.

==== Fall camp ====
Tennessee opened its preseason fall camp on July 31 with a preseason media session and began practice on August 1. "We have to get a lot of players ready to play for the first time," Butch Jones said. "We have a lot of questions. We have a lot of untested positions and individuals in our football program. We have to test them each and every day both mentally and physically."

Junior wide receiver Cody Blanc suffered an injury in the Vols opening practice of fall camp on August 1. "We don't know (what he injured)", Coach Jones said. "It may be his ankle, maybe Achilles tendon. We're kind of waiting right now." On August 5, Coach Jones announced that Cody Blanc would be out the entire season after tearing his Achilles tendon.

On August 4, Coach Jones announced that freshman Jashon Robertson would move from defensive tackle to offensive guard.

In an interview with Ryan Callahan, Coach Jones spoke about the test of week 1. "They’re being challenged—not only on the field, but, again, this being the final week of classes, so they have papers due. They have final examinations coming up. So I think it's just a combination of a lot of things, but I was very pleased in the way they fought through it today. But (it's) not fighting through it. It's more in how you attack the day, and I thought that they attacked the day exceptionally well." The first week showed no clear front-runner for the starting QB job. In fact, it brought a lot of all too familiar problems to the surface such as inconsistency and timing. "I need much more consistency at the quarterback position right now", Bajakian said. The freshman who are here to bring Tennessee back to prominence did show great signs in the first week. "It's gonna be a slow process", Utah freshman safety Todd Kelly Jr. told GoVols247's Wes Rucker. "It's a learning process. We just got here. We've only been here for about a month and a half. Ultimately we just want to make this program [a] better place."

On August 14, Coach Jones announced that Justin Worley would be the starting quarterback.

After the second week of fall camp, Daniel Helm and Ethan Wolf emerged as the leading contenders for the starting role at tight end. Highly touted freshman wide receiver Josh Malone, who had struggled in the first week of practice, showed dramatic improvement in the team's second full scrimmage. "I'm proud of Josh Malone", Coach Jones said. "He's been fighting through things and he took big steps tonight." While Curt Maggitt was hobbled by a minor leg injury, freshman Derek Barnett got rave reviews from the coaches while practicing with the first team in Maggitt's place. No decision has been made on who will be the starting kicker according to Coach Jones.

After the final week of fall camp, Coach Jones made it clear that the young team is a work in progress on maturity and mentality. "We're still work-in-progress from the maturity standpoint. Like I said, some individuals are ahead of others in terms of maturity. We knew this. This isn't any surprise to us. They're 17-year-old kids going through their first training camp. It's having that mental toughness, mental conditioning to fight through the fatigue, especially the mental fatigue. We talk about being relentless and having a relentless approach. But the mental approach is so much more important than the physical approach. … We're very, very youthful. So every day is a learning experience for them." Despite a re-aggravated knee injury, Trevarris Saulsberry won't be out for the season as was initially feared. Coach Jones said he would be out for a few days at most.

== Personnel ==
Tennessee Head Coach Butch Jones will enter his second year as the Volunteers' head coach for the 2014 season. In his first season last year, he led the Vols to a 5–7 record that included wins over #11 South Carolina and Austin Peay that gave Tennessee its 800th win in school history. Tennessee also retains its entire coaching staff from 2013 for the first time since 2007.

=== Roster & staff ===
2014 Tennessee Volunteers football team roster
Players
Coaches
Offense

Pos.	#	Name	Class
RB	1	Jalen Hurd	Fr
WR	2	Pig Howard	Jr
WR	3	Josh Malone	Fr
WR	4	Vic Wharton	Fr
WR	5	Ryan Jenkins	Fr
WR	7	Drae Bowles	So
WR	8	Marquez North	So
WR	9	Von Pearson	Jr
QB	10	Will Bradshaw	Fr
QB	11	Joshua Dobbs	So
QB	12	Nathan Peterman	So
QB	13	Patrick Ashford	Jr
QB	14	Justin Worley	Sr
RB	15	Marlin Lane	Sr
QB	17	Devin Smith	Fr
WR	18	Jason Croom	So
RB	19	Devrin Young	Sr
RB	23	Chris Beck	Jr
RB	24	Derrell Scott	Fr
RB	24	Deanthonie Summerhill	Sr
WR	25	Josh Smith	So
WR	26	Jaye Rochell	Fr
RB	31	Justus Pickett	Jr
FB	39	Michael Cantwell	Jr
TE	40	Alex Ellis	Jr
FB	46	Logan Cavendar	So
TE	47	Joe Stocstill	So
RT	55	Coleman Thomas	Fr
C	57	Mack Crowder	Jr
LG	60	Austin Sanders	Fr
RT	63	Brett Kendrick	Fr
C	64	Ray Raulerson	Fr
LT	65	Jacob Gilliam	Sr
OL	66	Marques Pair	Sr
RG	71	Dylan Wiesman	So
LT	74	Dontavius Blair	Jr
LG	75	Marcus Jackson	Jr
OL	76	John Simcox	So
RG	77	Kyler Kerbyson	Jr
OL	78	Charles Mosley (injured)	Fr
OL	79	Thomas Edwards	Fr
TE	80	Daniel Helm	Fr
WR	81	Johnathon Johnson	Jr
WR	82	Neiko Creamer	Fr
WR	83	Cody Blanc (injured)	Jr
TE	84	Woody Quinn	Sr
TE	85	Brendan Downs	Sr
TE	86	A.J. Branisel	So
WR	87	Jacob Carter	Sr
TE	88	Ethan Wolf	Fr
TE	89	Greg Tisho	Fr

Defense

Pos.	#	Name	Class
CB	2	D'Andre Payne	Fr
DL	4	LaTroy Lewis	So
S	6	Todd Kelly Jr.	Fr
S	7	Rashaan Gaulden	Fr
DE	8	Dewayne Hendrix	Fr
DE	9	Derek Barnett	Fr
CB	12	Emmanuel Moseley	Fr
FS	13	Devaun Swafford	So
ROLB	17	Dillon Bates (injured)	Fr
S	20	Cortez McDowell	Fr
DB	21	David Priddy	So
CB	21	Riyahd Jones	Sr
CB	22	Malik Foreman	So
CB	23	Cameron Sutton	So
DB	26	Geraldo Orta	Jr
NB	27	Justin Coleman	Sr
FS	28	Lemond Johnson	So
ATH	29	Evan Berry	Fr
DB	30	Devin Williams	Fr
SS	33	LaDarrell McNeil	Jr
ROLB	34	Jalen Reeves-Maybin	So
OLB	36	Gavin Bryant	Fr
FS	37	Brian Randolph	Jr
LB	38	Nikolay Timoshchuk	So
ROLB	38	Justin King	So
DL	39	Kendal Vickers	Fr
DL	40	Dimarya Mixon	Fr
OLB	41	Elliott Berry	Fr
DL	42	Charles Folger	So
LOLB	43	Chris Weatherd	Jr
LB	43	Gage Beeler	Jr
DE	44	Jakob Johnson	Fr
MLB	45	A. J. Johnson	Sr
DB	46	Max Arnold	Jr
DE	50	Corey Vereen	So
LB	51	Kenny Bynum	So
DE	52	Joseph Henderson	Fr
MLB	53	Colton Jumper	Fr
DT	54	Jordan Williams	Sr
LOLB	56	Curt Maggitt	Jr
DL	58	Owen Williams	Jr
LB	59	Gregory Grieco	Sr
DL	69	Allan Carson	Jr
DT	72	Michael Sawyers	Fr
DL	78	Charles Mosley (injured)	Fr
DL	89	Jaylen Miller	So
DT	95	Danny O'Brien	So
DT	96	Trevarris Saulsberry	Jr

Special teams

Pos.	#	Name	Class
PK	5	George Bullock	So
LS	10	Will Bradshaw	Fr
K	25	Aaron Medley	Fr
PK	34	Patrick Toole	Jr
P	35	Ryan Ault	So
P	36	Trevor Daniel	Fr
PK	42	Derrick Brodus	Sr
P	43	Matt Darr	Sr
LS	54	Danny Finch	Fr
LS	57	Andrew Henry	Jr
LS	59	Matt Glampapa	Jr

Head coach

- Butch Jones – 2nd year

Coordinators/assistant coaches

- Mike Bajakian (offensive coordinator/quarterbacks coach) – 2nd year
- John Jancek (defensive coordinator) – 2nd year
- Willie Martinez (assistant head coach/defensive backs coach) – 2nd year
- Steve Stripling (associate head coach/defensive line coach) – 2nd year
- Zach Azzanni (wide receivers coach/recruiting coordinator) – 2nd year
- Mark Elder (tight ends coach/special teams coordinator) – 2nd year
- Robert Gillespie (running backs coach) – 2nd year
- Tommy Thigpin (linebackers coach) – 2nd year
- Dave Lawson (director of strength and conditioning) – 2nd year

Legend

- (C) Team captain
- (S) Suspended
- (I) Ineligible
- Injured
- Redshirt

Roster
Last update: September 22, 2014

=== 2014 recruiting class ===
Tennessee's 2014 recruiting class was ranked the fifth-best overall 2014 class by both Rivals.com and ESPN, fourth-best by Scout.com, and seventh-best by 247Sports.com. The Vols' 2014 class is known as the "legacy class" for its unusually large number of legacies, including Todd Kelly, Jr. (son of Todd Kelly), Dillon Bates (son of Bill Bates), twins Elliott and Evan Berry (sons of former Vol running back James Berry and brothers of All-American safety Eric Berry), Neiko Creamer (son of former Vol defensive back Andre Creamer), and Vic Wharton (nephew of former Tennessee basketball player Brandon Wharton). Isaiah McDaniel, the son of former Vol cornerback Terry McDaniel, joined the squad as a preferred walk-on. Will Bradshaw and Devin Smith, who were both standout quarterbacks at their respective East Tennessee high schools, joined the team July 10 as walk-ons.

College recruiting (2014)
Name	Hometown	School	Height	Weight	40^{‡}	Commit date
Derek Barnett; DE	Brentwood, Tennessee	Brentwood Academy	6 ft 3 in (1.91 m)	272.5 lb (123.6 kg)	4.96	Oct 9, 2013
Derek Barnett; DE	Recruit ratings: Scout: Rivals: 247Sports: ESPN:					
Dillon Bates; OLB	Ponte Vedra, Florida	Ponte Vedra HS	6 ft 3 in (1.91 m)	219.25 lb (99.45 kg)	4.51	Aug 3, 2013
Dillon Bates; OLB	Recruit ratings: Scout: Rivals: 247Sports: ESPN:					
Elliott Berry; OLB	Fairburn, Georgia	Creekside HS	5 ft 11 in (1.80 m)	196 lb (89 kg)	4.55	Nov 4, 2013
Elliott Berry; OLB	Recruit ratings: Scout: Rivals: 247Sports: ESPN:					
Evan Berry; ATH	Fairburn, Georgia	Creekside HS	5 ft 10 in (1.78 m)	191.75 lb (86.98 kg)	4.56	Nov 4, 2013
Evan Berry; ATH	Recruit ratings: Scout: Rivals: 247Sports: ESPN:					
Dontavius Blair; OT	Garden City, Kansas	Garden City Community College	6 ft 7 in (2.01 m)	302.5 lb (137.2 kg)	5.00	Oct 8, 2013
Dontavius Blair; OT	Recruit ratings: Scout: Rivals: 247Sports: ESPN:					
Gavin Bryant; ILB	Jackson, Alabama	Jackson HS	6 ft 2 in (1.88 m)	231.25 lb (104.89 kg)	4.53	Jun 17, 2013
Gavin Bryant; ILB	Recruit ratings: Scout: Rivals: 247Sports: ESPN:					
Neiko Creamer; TE	Elkton, Maryland	Eastern Christian Academy	6 ft 2 in (1.88 m)	220.25 lb (99.90 kg)	4.68	Mar 3, 2013
Neiko Creamer; TE	Recruit ratings: Scout: Rivals: 247Sports: ESPN:					
RaShaan Gaulden; S	Thompson's Station, Tennessee	Independence HS	6 ft 1 in (1.85 m)	174 lb (79 kg)	NA	Jul 20, 2013
RaShaan Gaulden; S	Recruit ratings: Scout: Rivals: 247Sports: ESPN:					
Daniel Helm; TE	Chatham, Illinois	Gleenwood HS	6 ft 3.5 in (1.92 m)	219.75 lb (99.68 kg)	4.88	Apr 23, 2013
Daniel Helm; TE	Recruit ratings: Scout: Rivals: 247Sports: ESPN:					
Joseph Henderson; DE	Shaker Heights, Ohio	Shaker Heights HS	6 ft 4 in (1.93 m)	226.25 lb (102.63 kg)	4.50	May 30, 2013
Joseph Henderson; DE	Recruit ratings: Scout: Rivals: 247Sports: ESPN:					
Dewayne Hendrix; DE	O'Fallon, Illinois	O'Fallon HS	6 ft 4 in (1.93 m)	254.5 lb (115.4 kg)	4.70	Oct 27, 2013
Dewayne Hendrix; DE	Recruit ratings: Scout: Rivals: 247Sports: ESPN:					
Jalen Hurd; RB	Hendersonville, Tennessee	Beech HS	6 ft 3 in (1.91 m)	228 lb (103 kg)	NA	Mar 14, 2013
Jalen Hurd; RB	Recruit ratings: Scout: Rivals: 247Sports: ESPN:					
Jakob Johnson; OLB	Jacksonville, Florida	Jean Ribault HS	6 ft 3 in (1.91 m)	238 lb (108 kg)	NA	Nov 24, 2013
Jakob Johnson; OLB	Recruit ratings: Scout: Rivals: 247Sports: ESPN:					
Todd Kelly; S	Knoxville, Tennessee	Webb School of Knoxville	5 ft 11 in (1.80 m)	190.75 lb (86.52 kg)	4.50	Mar 10, 2013
Todd Kelly; S	Recruit ratings: Scout: Rivals: 247Sports: ESPN:					
Josh Malone; WR	Gallatin, Tennessee	Station Camp HS	6 ft 2 in (1.88 m)	191.75 lb (86.98 kg)	4.49	Dec 4, 2013
Josh Malone; WR	Recruit ratings: Scout: Rivals: 247Sports: ESPN:					
Cortez McDowell; S	Locust Grove, Georgia	Locust Grove HS	6 ft 1 in (1.85 m)	202.5 lb (91.9 kg)	NA	Jul 16, 2013
Cortez McDowell; S	Recruit ratings: Scout: Rivals: 247Sports: ESPN:					
Aaron Medley; K	Lewisburg, Tennessee	Marshall County HS	6 ft 2 in (1.88 m)	171.25 lb (77.68 kg)	NA	May 22, 2013
Aaron Medley; K	Recruit ratings: Scout: Rivals: 247Sports: ESPN:					
Dimarya Mixon; DE	Mesquite, Texas	West Mesquite HS	6 ft 3 in (1.91 m)	264.33 lb (119.90 kg)	NA	Nov 9, 2013
Dimarya Mixon; DE	Recruit ratings: Scout: Rivals: 247Sports: ESPN:					
Emmanuel Moseley; CB	Greensboro, North Carolina	Dudley HS	6 ft 0 in (1.83 m)	163.75 lb (74.28 kg)	NA	Sep 10, 2013
Emmanuel Moseley; CB	Recruit ratings: Scout: Rivals: 247Sports: ESPN:					
Charles Moseley; DT	Brighton, Tennessee	Brighton HS	6 ft 4.5 in (1.94 m)	353.5 lb (160.3 kg)	NA	Dec 9, 2013
Charles Moseley; DT	Recruit ratings: Scout: Rivals: 247Sports: ESPN:					
Treyvon Paulk; RB	Alpharetta, Georgia	Milton HS	5 ft 9 in (1.75 m)	196.5 lb (89.1 kg)	4.37	Mar 15, 2013
Treyvon Paulk; RB	Recruit ratings: Scout: Rivals: 247Sports: ESPN:					
D'Andre Payne; CB	Washington, D.C.	Woodson HS	5 ft 10 in (1.78 m)	171.5 lb (77.8 kg)	NA	Apr 3, 2013
D'Andre Payne; CB	Recruit ratings: Scout: Rivals: 247Sports: ESPN:					
LaVon Pearson; WR	Quincy, California	Feather River	6 ft 3 in (1.91 m)	182.5 lb (82.8 kg)	NA	Oct 20, 2013
LaVon Pearson; WR	Recruit ratings: Scout: Rivals: 247Sports: ESPN:					
Ray Raulerson; OT	Tampa, Florida	Plant Senior HS	6 ft 5 in (1.96 m)	274.75 lb (124.62 kg)	5.15	Jul 18, 2013
Ray Raulerson; OT	Recruit ratings: Scout: Rivals: 247Sports: ESPN:					
Jashon Robertson; OG	Nashville, Tennessee	Montgomery Bell Academy	6 ft 3 in (1.91 m)	285.25 lb (129.39 kg)	4.82	Jan 15, 2014
Jashon Robertson; OG	Recruit ratings: Scout: Rivals: 247Sports: ESPN:					
Michael Sawyers; DT	Nashville, Tennessee	Ensworth HS	6 ft 3 in (1.91 m)	298 lb (135 kg)	4.90	Feb 5, 2014
Michael Sawyers; DT	Recruit ratings: Scout: Rivals: 247Sports: ESPN:					
Derrell Scott; RB	Havelock, North Carolina	Havelock HS	5 ft 11 in (1.80 m)	182.5 lb (82.8 kg)	4.55	Jan 27, 2014
Derrell Scott; RB	Recruit ratings: Scout: Rivals: 247Sports: ESPN:					
Coleman Thomas; C	Max Meadows, Virginia	Fort Chiswell HS	6 ft 6 in (1.98 m)	295.5 lb (134.0 kg)	NA	Mar 9, 2013
Coleman Thomas; C	Recruit ratings: Scout: Rivals: 247Sports: ESPN:					
Christopher Weatherd; OLB	Athens, Texas	Trinity Valley	6 ft 4 in (1.93 m)	213.75 lb (96.96 kg)	NA	May 31, 2013
Christopher Weatherd; OLB	Recruit ratings: Scout: Rivals: 247Sports: ESPN:					
Vic Wharton; WR	Thompson's Station, Tennessee	Independence HS	5 ft 11 in (1.80 m)	184.5 lb (83.7 kg)	NA	Dec 25, 2012
Vic Wharton; WR	Recruit ratings: Scout: Rivals: 247Sports: ESPN:					
Owen Williams; DT	El Dorado, Kansas	Butler County HS	6 ft 1 in (1.85 m)	282.5 lb (128.1 kg)	NA	Nov 24, 2013
Owen Williams; DT	Recruit ratings: Scout: Rivals: 247Sports: ESPN:					
Ethan Wolf; TE	Minster, Ohio	Minster HS	6 ft 6 in (1.98 m)	240 lb (110 kg)	NA	Apr 10, 2013
Ethan Wolf; TE	Recruit ratings: Scout: Rivals: 247Sports: ESPN:					
Overall recruit ranking: Scout: 4 Rivals: 5 247Sports: 7 ESPN: 5
‡ Refers to 40-yard dash; Note: In many cases, Scout, Rivals, 247Sports, On3, and ESPN may conflict in their listings of height, weight and 40 time.; In these cases, the average was taken. ESPN grades are on a 100-point scale.; Sources: "2014 Team Ranking". Rivals.com.

=== Returning starters ===
==== Offense ====
Player	Class	Position
Pig Howard	Junior	WR
Marquez North	Sophomore	WR
Joshua Dobbs	Sophomore	QB
Justin Worley	Senior	QB
Marlin Lane	Senior	RB
Brendan Downs	Senior	TE

==== Defense ====
Player	Class	Position
Cameron Sutton	Sophomore	CB
Justin Coleman	Senior	CB
LaDarrell McNeil	Junior	SS
Brian Randolph	Junior	FS
A. J. Johnson	Senior	MLB

==== Special teams ====
Player	Class	Position
Pig Howard	Junior	KR
Devrin Young	Senior	PR

=== Depth chart ===
* This depth chart is the official lineup for week six.

Defense

FS
Brian Randolph
Todd Kelly, Jr.
Evan Berry

WLB	MLB	SLB
⋅	A. J. Johnson	⋅
Justin King	Kenny Bynum	⋅
⋅	Gavin Bryant	⋅

SS
LaDarrell McNeil
Devaun Swafford
Max Arnold

CB
Cameron Sutton
Emmanuel Moseley
⋅

DE	DT	DT	DE
Derek Barnett	Danny O'Brien	Jordan Williams	Corey Vereen
Dewayne Hendrix	Owen Williams	Dimarya Mixon	LaTroy Lewis
Kendal Vickers	⋅	Michael Sawyers	⋅

CB
Justin Coleman
Michael Williams
Rashaan Gaulden

Offense

WR
Marquez North
Jason Croom
⋅

WR
Josh Smith
Johnathon Johnson
⋅

LT	LG	C	RG	RT
Kyler Kerbyson	Marcus Jackson	Mack Crowder	Jashon Robertson	Coleman Thomas
Brett Kendrick	Austin Sanders	Dylan Wiesman	Brett Kendrick	Dylan Wiesman
Dontavius Blair	⋅	Coleman Thomas	Austin Sanders	⋅

TE
Ethan Wolf
Alex Ellis
Daniel Helm

WR
Josh Malone
Pig Howard
Jacob Carter

QB
Justin Worley
Nathan Peterman
Joshua Dobbs

RB
Marlin Lane
Jalen Hurd
Devrin Young

Special teams
PK George Bullock
PK Aaron Medley
P Matt Darr
P Aaron Medley
KR Cameron Sutton
PR Devrin Young
LS Matt Giampapa
H Patrick Ashford

== Schedule ==
The 2014 schedule was officially released on August 21, 2013. Tennessee will face all six Eastern Division opponents: Florida, Georgia, Kentucky, Missouri, South Carolina, and Vanderbilt. They will also face two Western Division opponents: official SEC rival Alabama and Ole Miss. Tennessee is not scheduled to play SEC opponents Arkansas, Auburn, LSU, Mississippi State, or Texas A&M. They are also scheduled to play four non-conference games: Oklahoma of the Big 12 Conference, Utah State of the Mountain West Conference, Chattanooga of the Southern Conference in the FCS, and Arkansas State of the Sun Belt Conference.

In his College Football Preview in March 2014, football analyst Phil Steele pointed out that, according to the NCAA method, Tennessee's 2014 schedule would be the nation's third toughest, behind the schedules of Arkansas and Virginia. His own ranking of the nation's toughest schedules has yet to be released.

Date	Time	Opponent	Site	TV	Result	Attendance
August 31	7:00 p.m.	Utah State*	Neyland Stadium; Knoxville, Tennessee	SECN	W 38–7	102,455
September 6	12:00 p.m.	Arkansas State*	Neyland Stadium; Knoxville, Tennessee	SECN	W 34–19	99,538
September 13	8:00 p.m.	at No. 4 Oklahoma*	Gaylord Family Oklahoma Memorial Stadium; Norman, Oklahoma	ABC	L 10–34	85,622
September 27	12:00 p.m.	at No. 12 Georgia	Sanford Stadium; Athens, Georgia (rivalry / SEC Nation)	ESPN	L 32–35	92,746
October 4	12:00 p.m.	Florida	Neyland Stadium; Knoxville, Tennessee (rivalry / Checker Neyland)	SECN	L 9–10	102,455
October 11	4:00 p.m.	No. 13 (FCS) Chattanooga*^{†}	Neyland Stadium; Knoxville, Tennessee	SECN	W 45–10	93,097
October 18	7:00 p.m.	at No. 3 Ole Miss	Vaught–Hemingway Stadium; Oxford, Mississippi (SEC Nation) (rivalry)	ESPN	L 3–34	62,081
October 25	7:30 p.m.	No. 4 Alabama	Neyland Stadium; Knoxville, Tennessee (Third Saturday in October)	ESPN2	L 20–34	102,455
November 1	7:30 p.m.	at South Carolina	Williams-Brice Stadium; Columbia, South Carolina (rivalry)	SECN	W 45–42 ^{OT}	81,891
November 15	4:00 p.m.	Kentucky	Neyland Stadium; Knoxville, Tennessee (Battle for the Barrel)	SECN	W 50–16	102,455
November 22	7:30 p.m.	No. 19 Missouri	Neyland Stadium; Knoxville, Tennessee (SEC Nation)	ESPN	L 21–29	95,821
November 29	4:00 p.m.	at Vanderbilt	Vanderbilt Stadium; Nashville, Tennessee (rivalry)	SECN	W 24–17	40,350
January 2, 2015	3:20 p.m.	vs. Iowa*	EverBank Field; Jacksonville, Florida (TaxSlayer Bowl)	ESPN	W 45–28	56,310
*Non-conference game; ^{†}Homecoming; Rankings from AP Poll released prior to game; All times are in Eastern time

Schedule source

=== Game summaries ===
==== Utah State ====
Utah State Aggies vs Tennessee Volunteers – Game summary

Quarter	1	2	3	4	Total
Utah State	0	0	0	7	7
Tennessee	14	3	7	14	38

at Neyland Stadium Knoxville, Tennessee

- Date: August 31, 2014
- Game time: 7:00 p.m. EDT
- Game weather: Temperature:81 °F (27 °C) • Wind:7 mph (11 km/h) • Weather: partly cloudy
- Game attendance: 102,455
- Referee: Referee: Marc Curles • Umpire: Rick Lowe • Linesman: John Langlois • Line judge: Kirk Lewis • Back judge: Scott Vaughan • Field judge: Jabir Walker • Side judge: Richard Rooker • Alternate: Blake Parks
- TV announcers (SEC Network): Joe Tessitore (play-by-play), Brock Huard (color) & Shannon Spake (sideline reporter)

Game information

First quarter

- TENN – Pig Howard 8-yard run (Aaron Medley kick), 9:23. Vols 7–0. Drive: 6 plays, 70 yards, 2:30
- TENN – Brendan Downs 12-yard pass from Justin Worley (Aaron Medley kick), 9:09. Vols 14–0 Drive: 0 plays, 0 yards, 0:08

Second quarter

- TENN – Aaron Medley 36-yard field goal, 1:00. Vols 17–0 Drive: 3 plays, 11 yards, 0:50.

Third quarter

- TENN – Von Pearson 14-yard pass from Justin Worley (Aaron Medley kick), 5:31. Vols 24–0 Drive: 9 plays, 34 yards, 3:20.

Fourth quarter

- TENN – Jalen Hurd 15-yard pass from Justin Worley (Aaron Medley kick), 14:51. Vols 31–0 Drive: 5 plays, 15 yards, 2:37.
- UT St. – Hunter Sharp 37-yard pass from Chuckie Keeton (Nick Diaz kick), 14:16. Vols 31–7 Drive: 8 plays, 73 yards, 2:58.
- TENN – Marlin Lane 7-yard run (Aaron Medley kick), 10:36. Vols 38–7 Drive: 3 plays, 0 yards, 0:25.

Top passers

- UT St. – Chuckie Keeton – 18/35, 144 yards, 1 TD, 1 INT
- TENN – Justin Worley – 27/38, 273 yards, 3 TD

Top rushers

- UT St.– JoJo Natson – 2 rushes, 47 yards
- TENN – Marlin Lane – 11 rushes, 41 yards, 1 TD

Top receiving

- UT St. – Hunter Sharp – 2 rec, 37 yards, 1 TD
- TENN – Josh Smith – 3 rec, 48 yards

In their first ever matchup on the gridiron, Tennessee opened the season with a 38–7 win over Utah State. Justin Worley threw for 273 yards and 3 touchdowns. "I didn't have the nerves I've had in the past", Worley said. "It goes back to my confidence level, the confidence I have in these guys, the confidence I have in the offensive scheme and everything. This being the second year (as a starter), my confidence is a lot higher. I tried to go out there and play like that."

Starting left tackle Jacob Gilliam suffered a torn ACL. "It's very very unfortunate," Butch Jones said of Gilliam's injury. "I feel for him and his family. He's a young man that– I love him to death. A walk-on who earned his scholarship, he earned it. It's very very unfortunate but that's football and we’ll need to have the next guy in. But I just feel for Jacob just because he's earned the respect of his peers and put himself in the position to be our starting left tackle."

==== Arkansas State ====
Arkansas State Red Wolves vs Tennessee Volunteers – Game summary

Quarter	1	2	3	4	Total
Arkansas State	6	6	0	7	19
Tennessee	10	14	7	3	34

at Neyland Stadium Knoxville, Tennessee

- Date: September 6, 2014
- Game time: 12:00 p.m. EDT
- Game weather: Temperature: 84 °F (29 °C) • Wind: 3 mph (4.8 km/h) • Weather: partly cloudy
- Game attendance: 99,538
- Referee: Referee: Matt Loeffler • Umpire: Brent Sowell • Linesman: Gus Morris III • Line judge: D. LaFontaine • Back judge: Tony Josselyn • Field judge: Bobby Ables • Side judge: Jess Dupuy
- TV announcers (SEC Network):

Game information

First quarter

- AK St. – Fredi Knighten 4-yard run (Luke Ferguson kick no good), 11:03. 'Red Wolves 6–0. Drive: 6 plays, 40 yards, 2:13.
- TENN – Aaron Medley 20-yard field goal, 7:16. Red Wolves 6–3. Drive: 9 plays, 73 yards, 3:47.
- TENN – Jalen Hurd 4-yard run (Aaron Medley kick), 3:02. Vols 10–6. Drive: 10 plays, 70 yards, 3:08.

Second quarter

- TENN – Marquez North 10-yard pass from Justin Worley (Aaron Medley kick), 13:01. Vols 17–6. Drive: 10 plays, 77 yards, 2:23.
- AK St. – Tres Houston 9-yard pass from Fredi Knighten (Two-point conversion failed), 4:10. Vols 17–12. Drive: 13 plays, 72 yards, 4:29.
- TENN – Justin Worley 5-yard run (Aaron Medley kick), 1:20. Vols 24–12. Drive: 10 plays, 71 yards, 2:36.

Third quarter

- TENN – Marquez North 14-yard pass from Justin Worley (Aaron Medley kick), 7:52. Vols 31–12. Drive: 10 plays, 64 yards, 3:15.

Fourth quarter

- AK St. – DeKeathan Williams 24-yard run (Luke Ferguson good), 10:06. Vols 31–19. Drive: 11 plays, 83 yards, 3:36.
- TENN – Aaron Medley 38-yard kick, 1:41. Vols 34–19. Drive: 4 plays, 9 yards, 1:06.

Top passers

- AK St. – Fredi Knighten – 21/34, 166 yards, 1 TD
- TENN – Justin Worley – 22/38, 247 yards, 2 TD, 1 INT

Top rushers

- AK St. – Fredi Knighten – 14 rushes, 65 yards, 1 TD
- TENN – Jalen Hurd – 23 rushes, 83 yards, 1 TD

Top receiving

- AK St. – Tres Houston – 4 rec, 48 yards, 1 TD
- TENN – Von Pearson – 4 rec, 71 yards

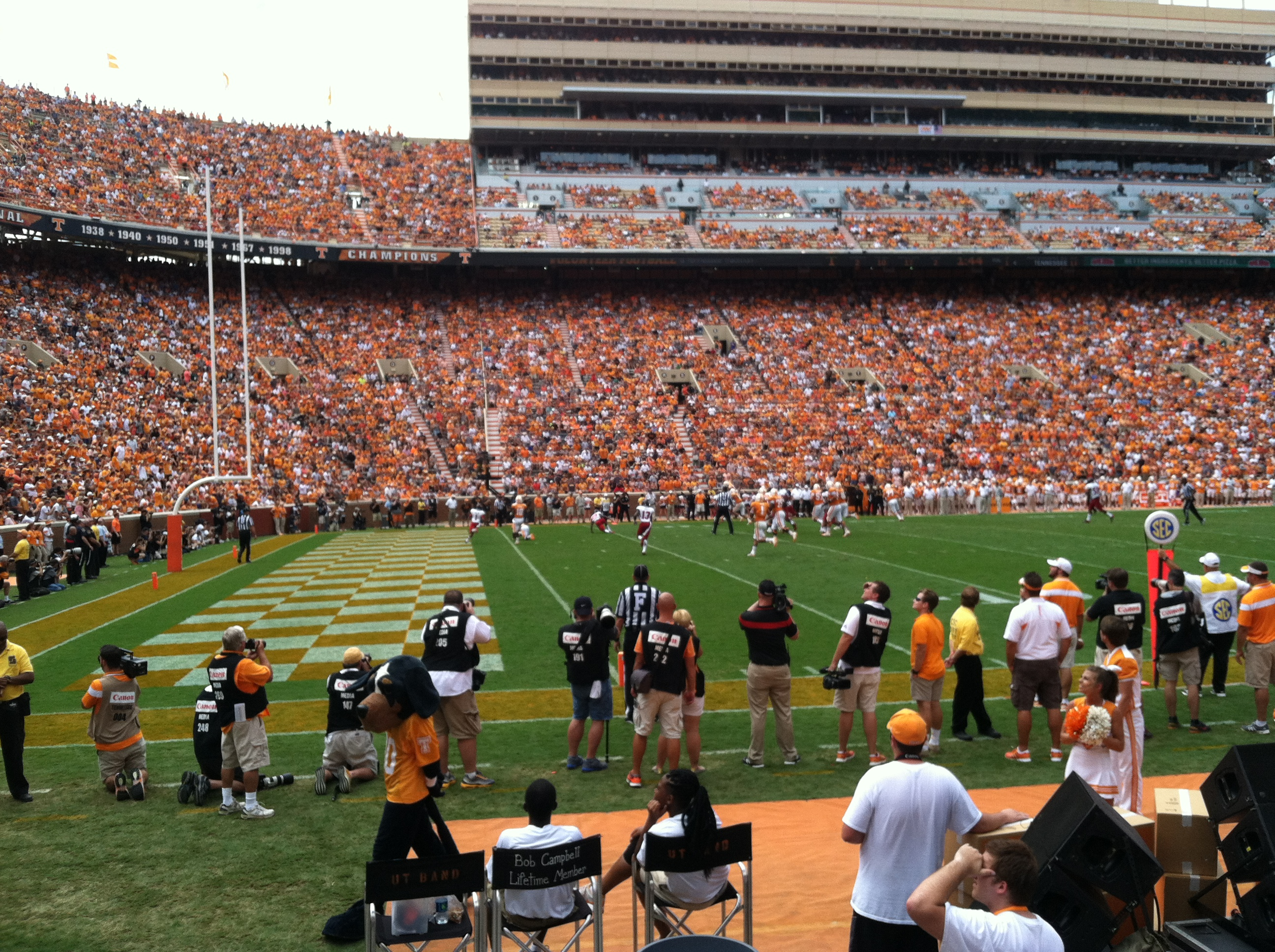
Game action in the 34–19 win.

Tennessee improved their overall record against Sun Belt Conference teams to 8–0 with a 34–19 win over Arkansas State. This was the fourth straight year Tennessee started a season 2–0. Despite trailing for the first time this season, Tennessee took control of the ball game at the tail-end of the first quarter and Arkansas State wasn't able to fight back.

Von Pearson suffered a high ankle sprain in this game and didn't play against Oklahoma.

==== #4 Oklahoma ====
Tennessee Volunteers at #4 Oklahoma Sooners – Game summary

Quarter	1	2	3	4	Total
Tennessee	0	7	3	0	10
#4 Oklahoma	13	7	7	7	34

at Gaylord Family Oklahoma Memorial Stadium Norman, Oklahoma

- Date: September 13, 2014
- Game time: 8:00 p.m. EDT
- Game weather: Temperature: 62 °F (17 °C) • Wind: 6 mph (9.7 km/h) • Weather: partly cloudy
- Game attendance: 85,622
- Referee: Referee: Matt Moore • Umpire: Tom Quick • Linesman: Gary Jayroe • Line judge: David Oliver • Back judge: Grantis Bell • Field judge: Phillip Davenpo • Side judge: Chris Conley
- TV announcers (ABC): Chris Fowler (play-by-play), Kirk Herbstreit (color commentator), Heather Cox (sideline reporter)

Game information

First quarter

- OKLA – Michael Hunnicutt 29-yard field goal, 9:48. Sooners 3–0. Drive: 10 plays, 45 yards, 3:53.
- OKLA – Keith Ford 23-yard pass from Trevor Knight (Michael Hunnicutt kick), 5:52. Sooners 10–0. Drive: 6 plays, 54 yards, 1:48.
- OKLA – Michael Hunnicutt 27-yard field goal, 0:04. Sooners 13–0. Drive: 7 plays, 53 yards, 3:15.

Second quarter

- TENN – Josh Smith 40-yard pass from Justin Worley (Aaron Medley kick), 9:46. Sooners 13–7. Drive: 8 plays, 79 yards, 2:54.
- OKLA – Keith Ford 11-yard run (Michael Hunnicutt kick), 1:33. Sooners 20–7. Drive: 9 plays, 81 yards, 3:49.

Third quarter

- OKLA – Trevor Knight 5-yard run (Michael Hunnicutt kick), 12:25. Sooners 27–7. Drive: 6 plays, 75 yards, 2:35.
- TENN – Aaron Medley 31-yard kick, 2:29. Sooners 27–10. Drive: 7 plays, 17 yards, 2:55.

Fourth quarter

- OKLA – Julian Wilson 100-yard interception return (Michael Hunnicutt kick), 10:57. Sooners 34–10. Drive: 0 plays, 100 yards, 0:00.

Top passers

- TENN – Justin Worley – 21/44, 201 yards, 1 TD, 2 INT
- OKLA – Trevor Knight – 20/33, 308 yards, 1 TD, 1 INT

Top rushers

- TENN – Jalen Hurd – 14 rushes, 97 yards
- OKLA – Keith Ford – 15 rushes, 56 yards, 1 TD

Top receiving

- TENN – Josh Smith – 5 rec, 58 yards, 1 TD
- OKLA – Sterling Shepard – 5 rec, 109 yards

In the first road game of the season, Tennessee suffered its first loss of the season at the hands of the fourth ranked Oklahoma Sooners. The young offensive line was overwhelmed the whole night by the much more experienced Sooner defense as they sacked Justin Worley five times (not including one that was negated by a face mask penalty), intercepted two balls in the end zone, including one that was returned 100 yards for a touchdown, and recovered a fumble. "We improved in some areas, but when you go on the road against a quality opponent like Oklahoma you can't turn the football over", Butch Jones said. "A game can come down to two or three plays and you never know which plays are going to make a difference."

During the time between Oklahoma and Georgia, Coach Jones announced that freshman running back Treyvon Paulk had been dismissed from the team for a "personal conduct" issue. He did not elaborate further.

==== #12 Georgia ====
Tennessee Volunteers at #12 Georgia Bulldogs – Game summary

Quarter	1	2	3	4	Total
Tennessee	10	7	0	15	32
#12 Georgia	7	14	0	14	35

at Sanford Stadium Athens, Georgia

- Date: September 27, 2014
- Game time: 12:00 p.m. EDT
- Game weather: Temperature: 71 °F (22 °C) • Wind: East 13 miles per hour (21 km/h) • Weather: overcast
- Game attendance: 92,746
- Referee: Referee: Matt Austin • Umpire: Rodney Lawary • Linesman: Tim Sistrunk • Line judge: Michael Taylor • Back judge: Jimmy Russell • Field judge: Blake Parks • Side judge: Bobby Moreau
- TV announcers (ESPN): Dave Pasch (play-by-play), Brian Griese (color commentator), Tom Luginbill (sideline reporter)

Game information

First quarter

- TENN – Aaron Medley 46-yard field goal, 11:39. Vols 3–0. Drive: 9 plays, 43 yards, 3:21.
- TENN – Jalen Hurd 1-yard run (Aaron Medley kick), 5:04. Vols 10–0. Drive: 9 plays, 72 yards, 3:04.
- GEOR – Hutson Mason 3-yard run (Marshall Morgan kick), 1:07. Vols 10–7. Drive: 4 plays, 32 yards, 1:03.

Second quarter

- GEOR – Todd Gurley 1-yard run (Marshall Morgan kick), 8:45. Dawgs 14–10. Drive: 11 plays, 87 yards, 4:16.
- GEOR – Nick Chubb 20-yard pass from Hutson Mason (Marshall Morgan kick), 1:17. Dawgs 21–10. Drive: 11 plays, 81 yards, 4:14.
- TENN – Jason Croom 23-yard pass from Justin Worley (Aaron Medley kick), 0:18. Dawgs 21–17. Drive: 7 plays, 83 yards, 0:59.

Third quarter

- None

Fourth quarter

- GEOR – Todd Gurley 51-yard run (Marshall Morgan kick), 9:31. Dawgs 28–17. Drive: 5 plays, 77 yards, 1:38.
- TENN – Pig Howard 31-yard pass from Justin Worley (2-point conversion successful), 8:07. Dawgs 28–25. Drive: 4 plays, 52 yards, 1:15.
- GEOR – Josh Dawson fumble recovery (Marshall Morgan kick), 4:27. Dawgs 35–25. Drive: 0 plays, 0 yards, 0:00.
- TENN – Marquez North 6-yard pass from Justin Worley (Aaron Medley kick), 2:14. Dawgs 35–32. Drive: 7 plays, 58 yards, 2:02.

Top passers

- TENN – Justin Worley – 23/35, 264 yards, 3 TD
- GEOR – Hutson Marson – 16/25, 147 yards, 1 TD, 2 INT

Top rushers

- TENN – Jalen Hurd – 24 rushes, 126 yards, 1 TD, 1 FUM
- GEOR – Todd Gurley – 28 rushes, 217 yards, 2 TD

Top receiving

- TENN – Ethan Wolf – 5 rec, 69 yards
- GEOR – Michael Bennett – 4 rec, 31 yards

In their first SEC game of the 2014 season, Tennessee fell short of upsetting a ranked Georgia team for the third consecutive year. The defense kept the Vols in the game, but inconsistent drives and failing to capitalize on two interceptions prevented them from taking control of the game. Heisman candidate Todd Gurley ran for a career-high 217 yards and scored two touchdowns. Ultimately, a fumble in the end zone recovered by Josh Dawson is what sealed the game for the Bulldogs.

==== Florida ====
Florida Gators vs Tennessee Volunteers – Game summary

Quarter	1	2	3	4	Total
Florida	0	0	0	10	10
Tennessee	0	3	6	0	9

at Neyland Stadium Knoxville, Tennessee

- Date: October 4, 2014
- Game time: 12:00 p.m. EDT
- Game weather: Temperature: 54 °F (12 °C) • Wind: WNW 10 miles per hour (16 km/h) • Weather: sunny
- Game attendance: 102,455
- Referee: Referee: Hubert Owens • Umpire: Brent Sowell • Linesman: Gus Morris • Line judge: Michael Shirey • Back judge: Stan Murray • Field judge: Greg Thomas • Side judge: Chad Hill
- TV announcers (SEC Network): Brent Musburger (play-by-play), Jesse Palmer (color commentator), Maria Taylor (sideline reporter)

Game information

First quarter

- None

Second quarter

- TENN Aaron Medley 36-yard field goal, 13:23. Vols 3–0. Drive: 9 plays, 36 yards, 2:58.

Third quarter

- TENN Aaron Medley 38-yard field goal, 9:24. Vols 6–0. Drive: 4 plays, −3 yards, 0:38.
- TENN Aaron Medley 39-yard field goal, 2:21. Vols 9–0. Drive: 8 plays, 47 yards, 3:09.

Fourth quarter

- FLA Matt Jones 2-yard run (Francisco Velez kick), 13:40. Vols 9–7. Drive: 5 plays, 30 yards, 1:28.
- FLA Austin Hardin 49-yard field goal, 6:20. Gators 10–9. Drive: 8 plays, 49 yards, 3:38.

Top passers

- FLA – Jeff Driskel – 11/23, 59 yards, 3 INT
- TENN – Justin Worley – 26/39, 205 yards, 2 INT

Top rushers

- FLA – Matt Jones – 23 rushes, 114 yards, 1 TD
- TENN – Jalen Hurd – 10 rushes, 39 yards

Top receiving

- FLA – Demarcus Robinson – 3 rec, 30 yards
- TENN – Pig Howard – 6 rec, 79 yards

In front of a sold-out crowd of over 100-thousand fans which wore color-coordinated shirts to create an orange-and-white checkerboarded Neyland Stadium, the Tennessee Volunteers allowed ten unanswered points in the fourth quarter and fell to the Florida Gators for the tenth consecutive season. The Volunteers had a 9–0 lead at the start of the fourth until Matt Jones scored the first touchdown of the game with 13 minutes and 40 seconds left in the game. Austin Hardin scored a controversial game-winning field goal after time had expired on the play clock that was not called back. Justin Worley was driving the team down the field when he threw a costly interception that was picked off by Keanu Neal.

==== Chattanooga ====
Chattanooga Mocs vs Tennessee Volunteers – Game summary

Quarter	1	2	3	4	Total
Chattanooga	0	3	0	7	10
Tennessee	7	17	14	7	45

at Neyland Stadium Knoxville, Tennessee

- Date: October 11, 2014
- Game time: 4:00 p.m. EDT
- Game weather: Temperature: 69 °F (21 °C) • Wind: North at 5 miles per hour (8.0 km/h) • Weather: partly cloudy
- Game attendance: 93,097
- Referee: Referee: Marc Curles • Umpire: Tom Quick • Linesman: John Langlois • Line judge: Kirk Lewis • Back judge: Scott Vaughan • Field judge: Jabir Walker • Side judge: Richard Rooker
- TV announcers (SEC Network): Tom Hart (play-by-play), Matt Stinchcomb (Color-Commentator), Heather Mitts (sideline reporter)

Game information

First Quarter

- TENN Marquez North 5-yard pass from Justin Worley (Aaron Medley kick), 9:20. Vols 7–0. Drive: 8 plays, 38 yards, 3:06.

Second quarter

- TENN Aaron Medley 25-yard field goal, 14:22. Vols 10–0. Drive: 11 plays, 78 yards, 3:16.
- TENN Justin Worley 8-yard run (Aaron Medley kick), 13:48. Vols 17–0. Drive: 3 plays, 29 yards, 0:29.
- CHAT Henrique Ribeiro 27-yard field goal, 2:17. Vols 17–3. Drive: 7 plays, 18 yards, 3:26.
- TENN Johnathon Johnson 21-yard pass from Justin Worley (Aaron Medley kick), 0:15. Vols 24–3. Drive: 8 plays, 71 yards, 2:02.

Third quarter

- TENN Johnathon Johnson 19-yard pass from Justin Worley (Aaron Medley kick), 14:08. Vols 31–3. Drive: 2 plays, 19 yards, 0:52.
- TENN Justin Worley 1-yard run (Aaron Medley kick), 4:47. Vols 38–3. Drive: 4 plays, 16 yards, 1:32.

Fourth quarter

- CHAT Richardre Bagley 14-yard run (Henrique Ribeiro kick), 6:38. Vols 38–10. Drive: 9 plays, 75 yards, 4:35.
- TENN Nathan Peterman 14-yard run (Aaron Medley kick), 3:40. Vols 45–10. Drive: 1 play, 14 yards, 0:09.

Top passers

- CHAT – Jacob Huesman – 9/16, 85 yards, 1 INT
- TENN – Justin Worley – 19/24, 198 yards, 3 TD

Top rushers

- CHAT – Jacob Huesman – 12 rushes, 45 yards
- TENN – Derrell Scott – 9 rushes, 42 yards

Top receiving

- CHAT – Faysal Shafaat – 3 rec, 45 yards
- TENN – Johnathon Johnson – 3 rec, 46 yards, 2 TD

In the sixth game of the season, Tennessee ended a three-game losing skid with a 45–10 victory over Chattanooga. The two programs were meeting for the first time in 45 years, since a Mocs victory in 1969. Justin Worley completed 79% of his passes for 198 yards and three touchdowns. The team combined for 123 rushing yards and 217 receiving yards. Worley became the first Tennessee quarterback to rush for two touchdowns in a game since Casey Clausen in a 45–17 Florida Citrus Bowl triumph over Michigan on January 1, 2002.

==== #3 Ole Miss ====
Tennessee Volunteers at #3 Ole Miss Rebels – Game summary

Quarter	1	2	3	4	Total
Tennessee	0	3	0	0	3
#3 Ole Miss	0	14	10	10	34

at Vaught–Hemingway Stadium Oxford, Mississippi

- Date: October 18, 2014
- Game time: 7:00 p.m. EDT
- Game weather: Temperature:63 °F (17 °C) • Wind:North at 6 miles per hour (9.7 km/h) • Weather: partly cloudy
- Game attendance: 62,081
- Referee: Referee:Ken Williamson • Umpire:Wally Hough • Linesman:Lane Thomas • Line judge:Mickey Bryson • Back judge:Grantis Bell • Field judge:Grant Jackson • Side judge:Rob Skelton
- TV announcers (ESPN): Brad Nessler (play-by-play), Todd Blackledge (color-commentator), Holly Rowe (sideline reporter)

Game information

First quarter

- None

Second quarter

- TENN Aaron Medley 27-yard field goal, 12:40. Vols 3–0. Drive: 7 plays, 38 yards, 2:48.
- MISS Vince Sanders 39-yard pass from Bo Wallace (Gary Wunderlich kick), 5:08. Rebels 7–3. Drive: 4 plays, 73 yards, 1:09.
- MISS Jaylen Walton 7-yard run (Gary Wunderlich kick), 1:51. Rebels 14–3. Drive: 5 plays, 35 yards, 2:10.

Third quarter

- MISS Gary Wunderlich 34-yard field goal, 2:04. Rebels 17–3. Drive: 5 plays, 46 yards, 1:46.
- MISS Evan Engram 28-yard pass from Bo Wallace (Gary Wunderlich kick), 1:50. Rebels 24–3. Drive: 1 play, 28 yards, 0:14.

Fourth quarter

- MISS Gary Wunderlich 27-yard kick, 7:53. Rebels 27–3. Drive: 14 plays, 62 yards, 6:52.
- MISS Mark Dodson 8-yard run, 0:31. Rebels 34–3. Drive: 9 plays, 55 yards, 4:41.

Top passers

- TENN – Justin Worley – 19/34, 191 yards, 3 INT
- MISS – Bo Wallace – 13/28, 199 yards, 2 TD

Top rushers

- TENN – Jalen Hurd – 13 rushes, 40 yards
- MISS – Jaylen Walton – 10 rushes, 60 yards, 1 TD

Top receiving

- TENN – Josh Malone – 5 rec, 75 yards.
- MISS – Vince Sanders – 4 rec, 108 yards, 1 TD

In their third SEC game of the 2014 season, Tennessee had its lowest offensive production of the season in a 34 to three loss to the third ranked Ole Miss Rebels. "Turnovers were the story of the game", Tennessee coach Butch Jones said. "We had a lot of negative yardage. When you are 3-for-16 on third-down conversions you are not giving yourself an opportunity to be in the game and win." The Volunteers continued to play excellent on defense. "They're phenomenal", Wallace said. "They're fun to watch. Before the season I knew they were good. I didn't know they were this good. All I have to do is take care of the ball."

==== #4 Alabama ====
#4 Alabama Crimson Tide vs Tennessee Volunteers – Game summary

Quarter	1	2	3	4	Total
#4 Alabama	20	7	7	0	34
Tennessee	0	10	7	3	20

at Neyland Stadium Knoxville, Tennessee

- Date: October 25, 2014
- Game time: 7:37 p.m. EDT
- Game weather: Temperature: 63 °F (17 °C) • Wind: Southwest at 4 miles per hour (6.4 km/h) • Weather: cloudy
- Game attendance: 102,455
- Referee: Referee: Matt Moore • Umpire: Tom Quick • Linesman: Gary Jayroe • Line judge: Michael Shirey • Back judge: Dax Hill • Field judge: Phil Davenport • Side judge: Chris Conley
- TV announcers (ESPN2): Joe Tessitore (play-by-play), Brock Huard (color commentator) & Shannon Spake (sideline reporter)

Game information

First quarter

- BAMA Amari Cooper 80-yard pass from Blake Sims (Adam Griffith kick no good), 12:39. Tide 6–0. Drive: 1 play, 80 yards, 0:13.
- BAMA Amari Cooper 41-yard pass from Blake Sims (Adam Griffith kick), 8:55. Tide 13–0. Drive: 7 plays, 79 yards, 2:09.
- BAMA T. J. Yeldon 1-yard run (Adam Griffith kick), 3:12. Tide 20–0. Drive: 9 plays, 90 yards, 4:00.

Second quarter

- BAMA Blake Sims 28-yard run (Adam Griffith kick), 12:03. Tide 27–0. Drive: 3 plays, 19 yards, 0:45.
- TENN Josh Malone 9-yard pass from Joshua Dobbs (Aaron Medley kick), 7:03. Tide 27–7. Drive: 10 plays, 84 yards, 5:00.
- TENN Aaron Medley 27-yard field goal, 0:00. Tide 27–10. Drive: 11 plays, 59 yards, 3:53.

Third quarter

- TENN Von Pearson 9-yard pass from Joshua Dobbs (Aaron Medley kick), 5:52. Tide 27–17. Drive: 15 plays, 84 yards, 6:46.
- BAMA Derrick Henry 28-yard run (Adam Griffith kick), 0:13. Tide 34–17. Drive: 13 plays, 76 yards, 5:39.

Fourth quarter

- TENN Aaron Medley 24-yard field goal, 9:42. Tide 34–20. Drive: 6 plays, 17 yards, 2:03.

Top passers

- BAMA – Blake Sims – 14/24, 286 yards, 2 TD
- TENN – Joshua Dobbs – 19/32, 192 yards, 2 TD, 1 INT

Top rushers

- BAMA – Derrick Henry – 16 rushes, 78 yards, 1 TD
- TENN – Joshua Dobbs – 19 rushes, 75 yards

Top receiving

- BAMA – Amari Cooper – 9 rec, 224 yards, 2 TD
- TENN – Marquez North – 4 rec, 56 yards

In the 96th edition of the Third Saturday in October, the Tennessee Volunteers lost to the fourth ranked Alabama Crimson Tide for the eighth consecutive year. The Tide jumped to a 27–0 lead before the Vols scored 17 unanswered points to cut the deficit to ten. But a 28-yard touchdown run by Derrick Henry in the third quarter and an early fourth quarter pick by Joshua Dobbs put a dagger in Tennessee's late rally. They were only able to put up one more field goal to bring the final score to 34–20. Alabama was led by a 224-yard receiving performance by Amari Cooper compared to 56 yards by Tennessee's Marquez North.

==== South Carolina ====
Tennessee Volunteers at South Carolina Gamecocks – Game summary

Quarter	1	2	3	4	OT	Total
Tennessee	7	14	0	21	3	45
South Carolina	7	7	14	14	0	42

at Williams-Brice Stadium Columbia, South Carolina

- Date: November 1, 2014
- Game time: 7:39 p.m. EDT
- Game weather: Temperature: 51 °F (11 °C) • Wind: WNW at 12 miles per hour (19 km/h) • Weather: partly cloudy
- Game attendance: 81,891
- Referee: Referee: Matt Austin • Umpire: Rodney Lawary • Linesman: Chad Green • Line judge: Chuck Rice • Back judge: Stan Murray • Field judge: Greg Thomas • Side judge: Chad Hill
- TV announcers (SEC Network): Tom Hart (play-by-play), Matt Stinchcomb (color commentator) and Heather Mitts (sideline reporter)

Game information

First quarter

- SCAR Pharoh Cooper 11-yard run (Elliot Fry kick), 8:34. Cocks 7–0. Drive: 7 plays, 78 yards, 2:47.
- TENN Pig Howard 1-yard run (Aaron Medley kick), 2:37. Tied 7–7. Drive: 7 plays, 40 yards, 2:40.

Second quarter

- TENN Joshua Dobbs 7-yard run (Aaron Medley kick), 10:58. Vols 14–7. Drive: 11 plays, 80 yards, 3:05.
- SCAR Brandon Wilds 30 yard pass from Pharoh Cooper (Elliot Fry kick), 6:35. Tied 14–14. Drive: 8 plays, 88 yards, 4:23.
- TENN Joshua Dobbs 36-yard run (Aaron Medley kick), 0:07. Vols 21–14. Drive: 7 plays, 80 yards, 1:13.

Third quarter

- SCAR Brandon Wilds 5-yard run (Elliot Fry kick), 9:06. Tied 21–21. Drive: 8 plays, 74 yards, 3:02.
- SCAR Pharoh Cooper 12-yard pass from Dylan Thompson (Elliot Fry kick), 0:09. Cocks 28–21. Drive: 9 plays, 72 yards, 5:11.

Fourth quarter

- SCAR Pharoh Cooper 85-yard pass from Dylan Thompson (Elliot Fry kick), 13:22. Cocks 35–21. Drive: 3 plays 84 yards, 0:58.
- TENN Jalen Hurd 21-yard pass from Joshua Dobbs (Aaron Medley kick), 6:34. Cocks 35–28. Drive: 6 plays, 47 yards, 1:59.
- SCAR Brandon Wilds 70-yard run (Elliot Fry), 4:52. Cocks 42–28. Drive: 4 plays, 82 yards, 1:42.
- TENN Joshua Dobbs 3-yard run (Aaron Medley kick), 1:50. Cocks 42–35. Drive: 10 plays, 75 yards, 3:02.
- TENN Jason Croom 9-yard pass from Joshua Dobbs (Aaron Medley kick), 0:11. Tied 42–42. Drive: 9 plays, 85 yards, 1:12.

Overtime

- TENN Aaron Medley 32-yard field goal, 0:00. Vols 45–42. Drive: 6 plays, 11 yards, 0:00.

Top passers

- TENN – Joshua Dobbs – 23/40, 301 yards, 2 TD, 1 INT
- SCAR – Dylan Thompson – 20/32, 347 yards, 2 TD, 1 INT

Top rushers

- TENN – Joshua Dobbs – 24 rushes, 166 yards, 3 TD
- SCAR – Brandon Wilds – 8 rushes, 143 yards, 2 TD

Top receiving

- TENN – Pig Howard – 5 rec, 109 yards
- SCAR – Pharoh Cooper – 11 rec, 223 yards, 2 TD

In their fifth SEC game of 2014, Tennessee rallied back from a 14-point deficit in the fourth quarter to tie the game and force overtime. Aaron Medley booted home the game-winning field goal on UT's first overtime possession. After two sacks and an incomplete pass, Elliot Fry lined up for a 58-yard field goal that was blocked and gave the Volunteers their first SEC win of the season. Tennessee out-rushed an opponent for the first time this season with a combined 344 rushing yards. Joshua Dobbs accounted for 166 of those yards, establishing the new school record for quarterbacks rushing yards. With this scintillating victory, Tennessee moved into a tie with Missouri for the most all-time overtime victories.

==== Kentucky ====
Kentucky Wildcats vs Tennessee Volunteers – Game summary

Quarter	1	2	3	4	Total
Kentucky	3	10	3	0	16
Tennessee	14	19	17	0	50

at Neyland Stadium Knoxville, Tennessee

- Date: November 15, 2014
- Game time: 4:01 p.m. EST
- Game weather: Temperature: 43 °F (6 °C) • Wind: ESE at 3 miles per hour (4.8 km/h) • Weather: clear
- Game attendance: 102,455
- Referee: Referee: Tom Ritter • Umpire: Stan Weihe • Linesman: Johnny Crawford • Line judge: Tim Beard • Back judge: Dax Hill • Field judge: James Carter • Side judge: Chuck Russ
- TV announcers (SECN): Tom Hart (play-by-play), Matt Stinchcomb (color commentator) & Heather Mitts (sideline reporter)

Game information

First quarter

- KENT Austin MacGinnis 32-yard field goal, 10:38. Cats 3–0. Drive: 12 plays, 77 yards, 4:22.
- TENN Von Pearson 21-yard pass from Joshua Dobbs (Aaron Medley kick), 9:11. Vols 7–3. Drive: 5 plays, 73 yards, 1:27.
- TENN Brian Randolph 23-yard interception return (Aaron Medley kick), 5:07. Vols 14–3. Drive: 0 plays, 23 yards, 0:00.

Second quarter

- TENN Von Pearson 16-yard pass from Joshua Dobbs (Aaron Medley kick failed), 13:21. Vols 20–3. Drive: 14 plays, 66 yards, 5:00.
- TENN Aaron Medley 38-yard field goal, 8:31. Vols 23–3. Drive: 10 plays, 39 yards, 3:47.
- TENN Joshua Dobbs 9-yard run (Aaron Medley kick), 4:09. Vols 30–3. Drive: 7 plays, 50 yards, 2:37.
- KENT Patrick Towles 2-yard run (Austin MacGinnis kick), 1:27. Vols 30–10. Drive: 8 plays, 76 yards, 2:42.
- TENN Aaron Medley 21-yard field goal, 0:14. Vols 33–10. Drive: 7 plays, 66 yards, 1:13.
- KENT Austin MacGinnis 54-yard field goal, 0:00. Vols 33–13. Drive: 2 plays, 23 yards, 0:14.

Third quarter

- TENN Jason Croom 52-yard pass from Joshua Dobbs (Aaron Medley kick), 14:44. Vols 40–13. Drive: 1 play, 52 yards, 0:16.
- KENT Austin MacGinnis 30-yard field goal, 11:40. Vols 40–16. Drive: 10 plays, 64 yards, 3:04.
- TENN Aaron Medley 39-yard field goal, 3:17. Vols 43–16. Drive: 8 plays, 35 yards, 3:04.
- TENN Jalen Hurd 4-yard run (Aaron Medley kick), 0:20. Vols 50–16. Drive: 4 plays, 19 yards, 1:28.

Fourth quarter

- None

Top passers

- KENT – Patrick Towles – 13/25, 168 yards, 1 INT
- TENN – Joshua Dobbs – 19/27, 297, 3 TD

Top rushers

- KENT – Patrick Towles – 14 rushes, 29 yards, 1 TD
- TENN – Jalen Hurd – 24 rushes, 118 yards, 1 TD

Top receiving

- KENT – Javess Blue – 6 rec, 131 yards
- TENN – Jason Croom – 3 rec, 87 yards, 1 TD

In their sixth SEC game of the 2014 season, Tennessee, behind a 297-yard, three touchdown passing performance from Joshua Dobbs, continued its absolute dominance over their longtime rival Kentucky in a 50–16 blowout victory. For Tennessee, it moved them one game closer to a bowl game. For Kentucky, it was the continuation of a five-game losing skid after a 5–1 start to the season. Dobbs went 19 of 27 for 297 yards and threw two touchdown passes to Von Pearson and one to Jason Croom. Tennessee's Jalen Hurd rushed for 118 yards and a touchdown on 24 carries. Austin MacGinnis kicked three field goals for Kentucky, including a school-record 54-yarder.

==== #19 Missouri ====
#19 Missouri Tigers vs Tennessee Volunteers – Game summary

Quarter	1	2	3	4	Total
#19 Missouri	7	6	3	13	29
Tennessee	3	10	0	8	21

at Neyland Stadium Knoxville, Tennessee

- Date: November 22, 2014
- Game time: 7:37 p.m. EST
- Game weather: Temperature: 47 °F (8 °C) • Wind: SSW at 5 miles per hour (8.0 km/h) • Weather: clear
- Game attendance: 95,821
- Referee: Referee: Matt Austin • Umpire: Rodney Lawary • Linesman: Tim Sistrunk • Line judge: Michael Taylor • Back judge: Jimmy Russell • Field judge: Blake Parks • Side judge: Bobby Moreau
- TV announcers (ESPN): Chris Fowler (play-by-play), Kirk Herbstreit (color commentator) & Heather Cox (sideline reporter)

Game information

First quarter

- MIZZ Marcus Murphy 1-yard run (Andrew Baggett kick), 10:23. Tigers 7–0. Drive: 12 plays, 75 yards, 4:37.
- TENN Aaron Medley 38-yard field goal, 3:41. Tigers 7–3. Drive: 4 plays, 8 yards, 1:15.

Second quarter

- TENN Alex Ellis 31-yard pass from Patrick Ashford (Aaron Medley kick), 11:14. Vols 10–7. Drive: 7 plays, 78 yards, 3:04.
- MIZZ Marcus Murphy 7-yard run (Andrew Baggett kick missed), 11:14. Tigers 13–10. Drive: 9 plays, 65 yards, 3:24.
- TENN Aaron Medley 39-yard field goal, 3:49. Tied 13–13. Drive: 10 plays, 19 yards, 3:50.

Third quarter

- MIZZ Andrew Baggett 43-yard field goal, 7:40. Tigers 16–13. Drive: 13 plays, 6 yards, 5:40.

Fourth quarter

- MIZZ Jimmie Hunt 73-yard pass from Maty Mauk (Andrew Baggett kick), 10:42. Tigers 23–13. Drive: 3 plays, 75 yards, 1:48.
- MIZZ Bud Sasser 13-yard pass from Maty Mauk (Andrew Baggett kick missed), 6:22. Tigers 29–13. Drive: 6 plays, 66 yards, 2:59.
- TENN Jason Croom 4-yard pass from Joshua Dobbs (Joshua Dobbs 2-point conversion), 1:52. Tigers 29–21. Drive: 14 plays, 79 yards, 4:24.

Top passers

- MIZZ – Maty Mauk – 12/25, 230 yards, 2 TD
- TENN – Joshua Dobbs – 24/37, 195 yards, 1 TD, 1 INT

Top rushers

- MIZZ – Marcus Murphy – 19 rushes, 82 yards, 2 TD
- TENN – Jalen Hurd – 11 rushes, 40 yards, 1 TD

Top receiving

- MIZZ – Bud Sasser – 4 rec, 76 yards, 1 TD; Jimmie Hunt – 3 rec, 106 yards, 1 TD
- TENN – Pig Howard – 8 rec, 90 yards

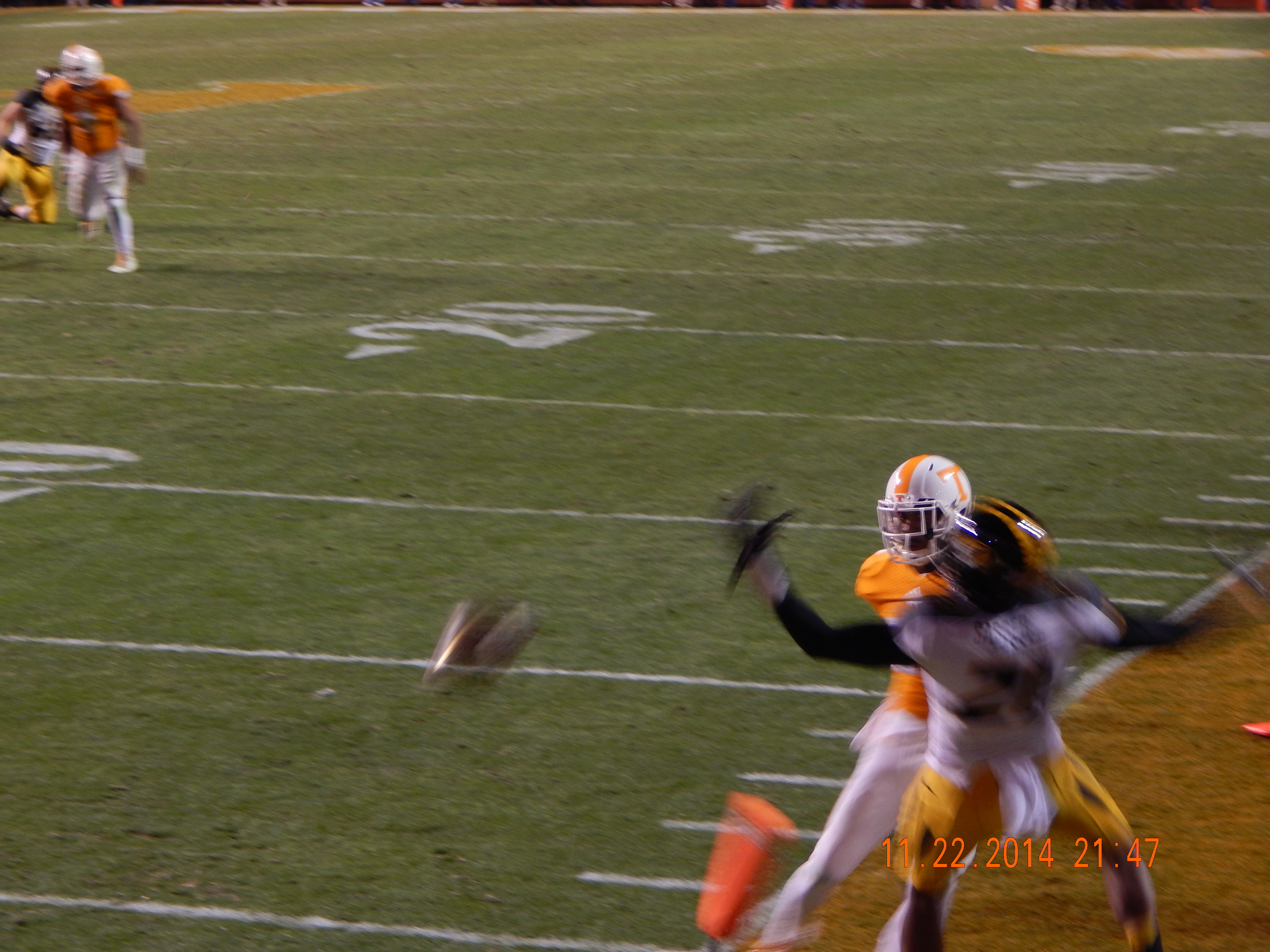
Maty Mauk's pass is deflected in the end zone.

In their seventh SEC game of the 2014 season, Tennessee celebrated senior day by squaring off with the Missouri Tigers. This was the third meeting between the two Eastern Division schools. Missouri remained the only SEC school that Tennessee has never defeated in football, with a 29–21 win. The Vols were missing leading tackler A.J. Johnson and cornerback Michael Williams, who were suspended from all team-related activities, as both were named as subjects of an ongoing rape investigation. The Vols also didn't have injured center Mack Crowder and receiver Marquez North. Safety Brian Randolph committed a targeting penalty in the previous game and had to sit out the first half. The absences forced Coach Butch Jones to start seven true freshmen, something never done before in a Tennessee game. The Vols recovered an onside kick with less than two minutes remaining in the game, but it was ruled Missouri ball since it didn't go ten yards. After reviewing the play, a Missouri player had touched the ball before it went ten yards making it a live ball which Tennessee recovered. However, referee Matt Austin also ruled that Tennessee had been offsides on the kick and had to re-kick it. Tennessee recovered the ball on the re-kick, but Justin Coleman touched the ball before it went ten yards, so Missouri took over and won the game.

==== Vanderbilt ====
Tennessee Volunteers at Vanderbilt Commodores – Game summary

Quarter	1	2	3	4	Total
Tennessee	10	7	7	0	24
Vanderbilt	0	10	7	0	17

at Vanderbilt Stadium Nashville, Tennessee

- Date: November 29, 2014
- Game time: 4:01 p.m. EST
- Game weather: Temperature: 59 °F (15 °C) • Wind: South 16 mph (26 km/h) • Weather: cloudy
- Game attendance: 40,350
- Referee: Referee: Ken Williamson • Umpire: Wally Hough • Linesman: Lane Thomas • Line judge: Mickey Bryson • Back judge: Grantis Bell • Field judge: Grant Jackson • Side judge: Rob Skelton
- TV announcers (SEC Network): Tom Hart (play-by-play), Matt Stinchcomb (color commentator) & Heather Mitts (sideline reporter)

Game information

First quarter

- TENN Cameron Sutton 76-yard punt return (Aaron Medley kick), 8:18. Vols 7–0.
- TENN Aaron Medley 36-yard field goal, 0:51. Vols 10–0. Drive: 15 plays, 63 yards, 6:36.

Second quarter

- VAN Tommy Openshaw 36-yard field goal, 9:52. Vols 10–3. Drive: 4 plays, 6 yards, 1:53.
- VAN Steven Scheu 36-yard pass from Patton Robinette (Tommy Openshaw kick), 5:25. Tied 10–10. Drive: 7 plays, 88 yards, 2:52.
- TENN Joshua Dobbs 1-yard run (Aaron Medley kick), 1:29. Vols 17–10. Drive: 11 plays, 94 yards, 3:49.

Third quarter

- TENN Joshua Dobbs 8-yard run (Aaron Medley kick), 3:19. Vols 24–10. Drive: 7 plays, 75 yards, 2:49.
- VAN Ralph Webb 3-yard run (Tommy Openshaw kick), 0:22. Vols 24–17. Drive: 7 plays, 71 yards, 2:46.

Fourth quarter

- None.

Top passers

- VANDY – Patton Robinette – 11/22, 131 yards, 1 TD, 2 INT
- TENN – Joshua Dobbs – 11/20, 92 yards, 2 INT

Top rushers

- VANDY – Ralph Webb – 16 rushes, 55 yards, 1 TD
- TENN – Joshua Dobbs – 21 rushes, 91 yards, 2 TD

Top receiving

- VANDY – Steven Scheu – 3 rec, 62 yards, 1 TD
- TENN – Pig Howard – 5 rec, 55 yards

In their 12th and final game of the 2014 season, Tennessee headed west on I-40 to Nashville to face their in-state rival, the Vanderbilt Commodores. This was the 108th meeting between these two bitter Eastern Division rivals. Before the game, Tennessee led the all-time series 73–29–5 (.706) against Vandy. The Vols won the game, 24–17, making them bowl eligible for the first time since 2010. Joshua Dobbs ran for two touchdowns and 91 yards as Tennessee also snapped a two-game skid to Vandy that had been their longest in this series since the 1925–26 season.

==== Iowa ====
Iowa Hawkeyes vs Tennessee Volunteers – Game summary

Quarter	1	2	3	4	Total
Iowa	0	7	0	21	28
Tennessee	21	14	7	3	45

at EverBank Field Jacksonville, Florida

- Date: January 2, 2015
- Game time: 3:25 p.m. EST
- Game weather: Temperature: 68 °F (20 °C) • Wind: SSW at 7 mph (11 km/h) • Weather: mostly cloudy
- Game attendance: 56,310
- Referee: Referee: Mike Mothershed • Umpire: R. Meisenheimer • Linesman: Darryl Johnson • Line judge: Randy Campbell • Back judge: Steve Hudson • Field judge: Kevin Keiser • Side judge: Aaron Santi • Alternate: Matt Richards
- TV announcers (ESPN): Mark Jones (play-by-play), Rob Gilmore (color commentator) & Jessica Mendoza (sideline reporter)

Game information

First quarter

- TENN Jalen Hurd 3-yard run (Aaron Medley kick), 9:27. Vols 7–0. Drive: 9 plays, 80 yards, 3:35.
- TENN Jalen Hurd 29-yard run (Aaron Medley kick), 2:54. Vols 14–0. Drive: 9 plays, 51 yards, 4:45.
- TENN Vic Wharton 49-yard pass from Marlin Lane (Aaron Medley kick), 1:31. Vols 21–0. Drive: 1 play, 49 yards, 0:13.

Second quarter

- TENN Joshua Dobbs 8-yard run (Aaron Medley kick), 12:02. Vols 28–0. Drive: 8 plays, 62 yards, 3:23.
- IOWA Mark Weisman 3-yard run (Marshall Koehn kick), 3:43. Vols 28–7. Drive: 9 plays, 71 yards, 4:30.
- TENN Von Pearson 19-yard pass from Joshua Dobbs (Aaron Medley kick), 0:21. Vols 35–7. Drive: 9 plays, 75 yards, 3:22.

Third quarter

- TENN Joshua Dobbs 11-yard run (Aaron Medley kick), 7:46. Vols 42–7. Drive: 9 plays, 75 yards, 3:13.

Fourth quarter

- IOWA Mark Weisman 1-yard run (Marshall Koehn kick), 14:29. Vols 42–14. Drive: 4 plays, 46 yards, 1:24.
- TENN Aaron Medley 28-yard field goal, 8:31. Vols 45–14. Drive: 11 plays, 34 yards, 5:56.
- IOWA Ray Hamilton 31-yard pass from C. J. Beathard (Marshall Koehn kick), 3:30. Vols 45–21. Drive: 6 plays, 80 yards, 2:13.
- IOWA Matt Vandeberg 18-yard pass from C. J. Beathard (Marshall Koehn kick), 0:20. Vols 45–28. Drive: 4 plays, 74 yards, 1:02.

Top passers

- IOWA – C. J. Beathard – 13/23, 145 yards, 2 TD, 1 INT
- TENN – Joshua Dobbs – 16/21, 129 yards, 1 TD, 2 INT; Marlin Lane 1/1, 49 yards, 1 TD

Top rushers

- IOWA – Jordan Canzeri – 12 rushes, 120 yards; C. J. Beathard – 8 rushes, 82 yards; Mark Weisman – 7 rushes, 10 yards, 2 TD
- TENN – Jalen Hurd – 16 rushes, 122 yards, 2 TD; Joshua Dobbs – 13 rushes, 76 yards, 2 TD

Top receiving

- IOWA – Ray Hamilton – 3 rec, 51 yards, 1 TD; Matt Vandeberg – 2 rec, 34 yards, 1 TD
- TENN – Von Pearson – 7 rec, 79 yards, 1 TD; Vic Wharton – 1 rec, 49 yards, 1 TD

Sophomore quarterback Joshua Dobbs accounted for three touchdowns–one passing, two rushing–in the Tennessee Volunteers' 45–28 win over the Iowa Hawkeyes in the 2015 TaxSlayer Bowl. Freshman running back Jalen Hurd had his fourth 100-yard game of the season, finishing with 122 yards and two touchdowns. Tennessee's 45 points tied for the second-most in a single bowl game in school history.

== Team statistics ==
	UT	OPP
Scoring	331	287
Points per game	27.6	23.9
First downs	250	221
Rushing	1,620	1,945
Passing	2,736	2,374
Penalty	50	74
Total offense	4,356	4,319
Avg per rush	3.4	4.1
Avg per Pass	6.3	6.9
Avg Rush per Game	135	162.1
Avg Pass per Game	228	197.8
Fumbles-Lost	18–8	18–7
Interceptions	13	15
Penalties-Yards	50–389	74–583
Avg per game	4.178–32.4	6.17–48.6

	UT	OPP
Punts-Yards	76–3,229	78–3,239
Avg per punt	42.5	41.5
Time of possession/Game	5:04:20	4:57:56
Avg TOP	30:05	29:55
3rd down conversions	76	62
4th down conversions	7	6
Touchdowns scored	39	37
Field goals-Attempts	19–25	11–17
PAT-Attempts	36–37	32–36
Attendance	698,276	362,690
Games/Avg per Game	99,754	72,538
