= Jason Croom =

American football player (born 1994)

No. 80, 81
- Position: Tight end

Personal information
- Born: February 28, 1994 (age 32); Norcross, Georgia, U.S.
- Listed height: 6 ft 5 in (1.96 m)
- Listed weight: 246 lb (112 kg)

Career information
- High school: Norcross
- College: Tennessee (2012–2016)
- NFL draft: 2017: undrafted

Career history
- Buffalo Bills (2017–2020); Philadelphia Eagles (2020–2021)

Career NFL statistics
- Receptions: 23
- Receiving yards: 262
- Receiving touchdowns: 2
- Stats at Pro Football Reference

Jason Croom (born February 28, 1994) is an American former professional football player who was a tight end in the National Football League (NFL). He played college football for the Tennessee Volunteers.

== Early life ==
Croom attended and played high school football at Norcross High School in Norcross, Georgia. He committed to play college football at the University of Tennessee.

== College career ==
Croom attended and played college football at the University of Tennessee from 2012 to 2016 under head coaches Derek Dooley and Butch Jones. In the 2012 season, he made his collegiate debut in the 51–13 victory over Georgia State. However, he suffered a shoulder injury and was redshirted in the 5–7 season for the Volunteers. In the 2013 season, he had 18 receptions for 269 receiving yards and two receiving touchdowns. In the second game of the 2013 season, a 59–14 loss to #2 Oregon, he scored his first collegiate touchdown, a four-yard pass from quarterback Justin Worley, in the first quarter. In the regular season finale, a 27–14 victory over Kentucky, he had two receptions for 74 receiving yards and one touchdown, which was a 43-yard reception. He finished fourth on the team in receptions, third in receiving yards, and tied for second in receiving touchdowns in the 5–7 season. In the 2014 season, he had 21 receptions for 305 receiving yards and finished tied for second on the team with four receiving touchdowns. He suffered a knee injury and was forced to miss the Vols' bowl game victory over Iowa. Croom missed the entire 2015 season as a result of a scope on his knee. He returned to the lineup as a tight end in the 2016 season, where he had 21 receptions for 242 receiving yards in the Volunteers' 9–4 season.

=== Collegiate statistics ===
Year	School	Conf	Pos	G	Rec	Yds	Avg	TD
2013	Tennessee	SEC	WR	10	18	269	14.9	2
2014	Tennessee	SEC	WR	7	21	305	14.5	4
2015	Tennessee	SEC	WR	Missed due to injury				
2016	Tennessee	SEC	TE	9	21	242	11.5	0
Career				26	60	816	13.6	6

== Professional career ==
=== Buffalo Bills ===
Croom went undrafted in the 2017 NFL draft. He was signed by the Buffalo Bills. On August 20, he was cut. One day later, he was placed on injured reserve with an undisclosed injury, but was removed four days later and was cut once more. On November 1, he was added to the practice squad. On January 8, 2018, he was signed back to the team.

In the Buffalo Bills' 2018 season-opener against the Baltimore Ravens, Croom had two receptions for 18 receiving yards in his NFL debut. In Week 3, against the Minnesota Vikings, he had a 26-yard receiving touchdown from Josh Allen for the first of his professional career.

On September 1, 2019, Croom was placed on injured reserve.

On September 5, 2020, Croom was waived by the Bills and signed to the practice squad the next day. He was released on September 22.

=== Philadelphia Eagles ===
On September 29, 2020, Croom was signed to the Philadelphia Eagles' practice squad. He was elevated to the active roster on October 10 and 17 for the team's weeks 5 and 6 games against the Pittsburgh Steelers and Baltimore Ravens, and reverted to the practice squad following each game. Against the Ravens, he caught a three-yard touchdown pass from Carson Wentz. He was promoted to the active roster on October 21. He was waived by the Eagles on November 3, but was re-signed to the practice squad the following day. On January 1, 2021, Croom was promoted to the active roster.

Croom suffered a significant knee injury in the preseason and was placed on season-ending injured reserve on August 21, 2021.
