= Justin Worley =

American football player (born 1992)

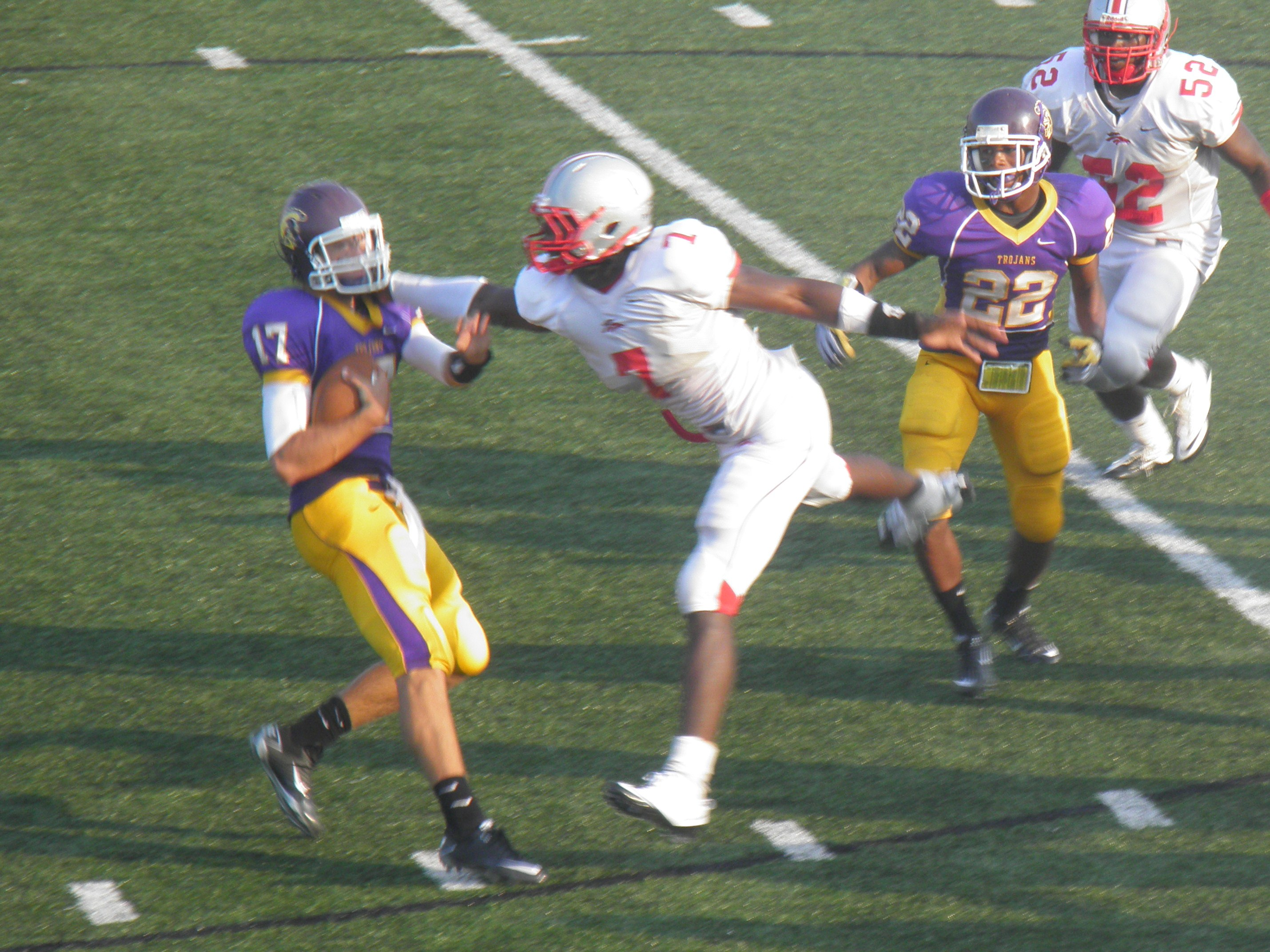
- Worley (#17) trying to evade a tackle by Jadeveon Clowney during a high school game on August 28, 2010

No. 14
- Position: Quarterback

Personal information
- Born: November 20, 1992 (age 33); Rock Hill, South Carolina, U.S.
- Listed height: 6 ft 4 in (1.93 m)
- Listed weight: 222 lb (101 kg)

Career information
- High school: Northwestern (Rock Hill)
- College: Tennessee
- NFL draft: 2015: undrafted

Career history
- Chicago Bears (2015)*
- * Offseason or practice squad member only

Justin Scott Worley (born November 20, 1992) is an American former football quarterback. Worley played college football for the Tennessee Volunteers.

== Early life ==
Worley attended Northwestern High School in Rock Hill, South Carolina, where he played high school football and was teammates with wide receiver Cordarrelle Patterson. As a sophomore, Worley helped lead Northwestern High School to the state championship game against town-rival South Pointe High School.

Regarded as a three-star recruit by the Rivals.com recruiting network, Worley was listed as the 24th-ranked pro-style quarterback in his class. He was selected as the national high school Gatorade Player of the Year in 2010.

== College career ==
Worley played backup to Tyler Bray during most of his first two seasons (2011–2012) at the University of Tennessee and only started nine times before the 2013 season. Once the 2013 season started, Worley was named the starter for most of the time when he was healthy.

=== 2011 season ===
On October 22, 2011, Worley was pushed into action against #2 Alabama Crimson Tide in relief of quarterback Matt Simms. Worley did not record any meaningful statistics except one rush for no yards in his first appearance for the Vols in the 37–6 defeat at Bryant–Denny Stadium. After a 14–3 home loss to South Carolina the next week at Neyland Stadium, Worley recorded his first career victory with the Volunteers against Middle Tennessee. In the 24–0 home victory over the Blue Raiders, Worley threw his first career collegiate touchdown to wide receiver Da'Rick Rogers. Worley's last appearance in the 2011 season came in a 49–7 loss to #8 Arkansas at Donald W. Reynolds Razorback Stadium. Worley had 208 yards passing and one interception in the defeat. Quarterback Tyler Bray returned from injury to finish out the 2011 season for the Volunteers.

=== 2012 season ===
In the 2012 season, Worley did not appear much as he did in the 2011 season as Bray was the starting quarterback for all of the season's games. In the 2012 season, Cordarrelle Patterson, who Worley was teammates with in high school, joined the Volunteers after transferring from Hutchinson Community College. On September 8, 2012, against Georgia State, Worley came into the blowout 51–13 home victory to finish the game in relief of Bray. Against #1 Alabama, Worley relieved Bray in the 44–13 defeat at home. In the penultimate game of Tennessee's 2012 season against Vanderbilt, Worley made his last appearance of the season after Bray got benched by head coach Derek Dooley, who would be fired after the game. Worley recorded 51 passing yards and interception in the 41–18 defeat at Vanderbilt Stadium.

=== 2013 season ===
Going into the 2013 season, Tennessee had a new head coach, Butch Jones. Bray left Tennessee to enter the 2013 NFL draft, and Worley was named the starting quarterback over Nathan Peterman, Joshua Dobbs, and Riley Ferguson after training camp. During the 2013 season, he was able to achieve some success but his personal achievements did not lead to overall team success. In the season opener against Austin Peay at home, Worley had a solid outing with 104 passing yards and three touchdowns in the 45–0 win. However, after a 52–20 win over Western Kentucky at home, he was benched after a poor performance in Tennessee's 59–14 loss at Autzen Stadium to Oregon for Nathan Peterman. Peterman started the next game against the Florida Gators at Ben Hill Griffin Stadium, but played poorly in the first half and was injured. Worley was put into the game in the second half of the 31–17 defeat, and he was named the starter once again after a decent outing against the Gators. One of his most notable performances in the 2013 season was against #6 Georgia, where Tennessee lost a narrow game at home by a score of 34–31 in overtime. He had a season-high 215 passing yards in the defeat. He had a solid performance against in a home game against #11 South Carolina, where he led Tennessee to its first win over a ranked team in several years with a game-changing pass to wide receiver Marquez North, which set up a Michael Palardy field goal as time expired to win the game by a score of 23–21. The next week, he sustained a season-ending thumb injury against #1 Alabama at Bryant–Denny Stadium. Freshman Joshua Dobbs relieved Worley in the 45–10 loss and was later named the starter for the remainder of the 2013 season. Under Worley and Dobbs, Tennessee would finish 5–7 and not reach bowl eligibility, which was the third consecutive season that the Vols missed a bowl game.

=== 2014 season ===
In 2014, Worley returned from his thumb injury was named the starting quarterback for the Vols for his senior season. The task was tough for Worley as Tennessee had to replace the entire offensive line from the previous season. He started in seven games in his senior season with the Volunteers. He started the season opener at home against Utah State. In the 38–7 victory, he had 273 passing yards and three touchdowns. Worley would have solid outings over the next two weeks but with very different results. Against Arkansas State, Worley had 247 passing yards and two touchdowns in the 34–19 home victory. Against #4 Oklahoma the following week, Worley had 201 yards passing and a touchdown, but suffered through five sacks, in the 34–10 defeat at Gaylord Family Oklahoma Memorial Stadium in Norman, Oklahoma. Against #12 Georgia two weeks later, Worley had 264 yards passing and three touchdowns in the narrow 35–32 defeat at Sanford Stadium in Athens, Georgia. After a narrow 10–9 home loss to Florida and a 45–10 victory over Chattanooga, Worley would play in the last game of his Tennessee career against #3 Ole Miss at Vaught–Hemingway Stadium. Worley was injured in the 34–3 loss and was relieved by Nathan Peterman. Worley would have season-ending shoulder surgery from the injury he sustained in the Ole Miss game. His season totals were 1,579 passing yards, 12 touchdowns, eight interceptions, 62.3% completion percentage, and was notably sacked 29 times, of which some blame was given to the inexperience of Tennessee's young offensive line in the 2014 season. Tennessee finished the season with a 7–6 record with Peterman and Joshua Dobbs at quarterback. The team became bowl eligible for the first time since 2010. Before his injury, Worley's contributions played a role in helping Tennessee get in position to return to a bowl game.

=== Statistics ===
Year	Team	Games			Passing											
Year	Team	GP	GS	Record	Cmp	Att	Pct	Yds	Avg	Lng	TD	Int	Sck	Rtg	Raw QBR	Adj QBR
2011	Tennessee	4	3	1–2	48	87	55.2	604	6.94	50	1	3	3	110.4	21.8	25.3
2012	Tennessee	5	0	–	15	23	65.2	134	5.83	19	0	2	0	96.8	35.5	51.2
2013	Tennessee	8	7	4–3	109	196	55.6	1,239	6.32	51	10	8	6	117.4	50.2	61.9
2014	Tennessee	7	7	3–4	157	252	62.3	1,579	6.3	56	12	8	29	124.3	41.6	57.7
Total		24	17	8–9	329	558	59.6	3,556	6.4	56	23	21	38	118.6	37.3	49.0

== Professional career ==
On November 24, 2015, Worley was signed as an undrafted free agent to the Chicago Bears' practice squad. His contract with the Bears was terminated on December 8, 2015.

== Personal life ==
After his stint with the Chicago Bears in 2015, Worley returned to Rock Hill, where he would work with the Rock Hill YMCA. Worley's responsibilities include overseeing the youth sports programs, sports clinics, and the fitness room.
