= Jalen Reeves-Maybin =

American football player (born 1995)

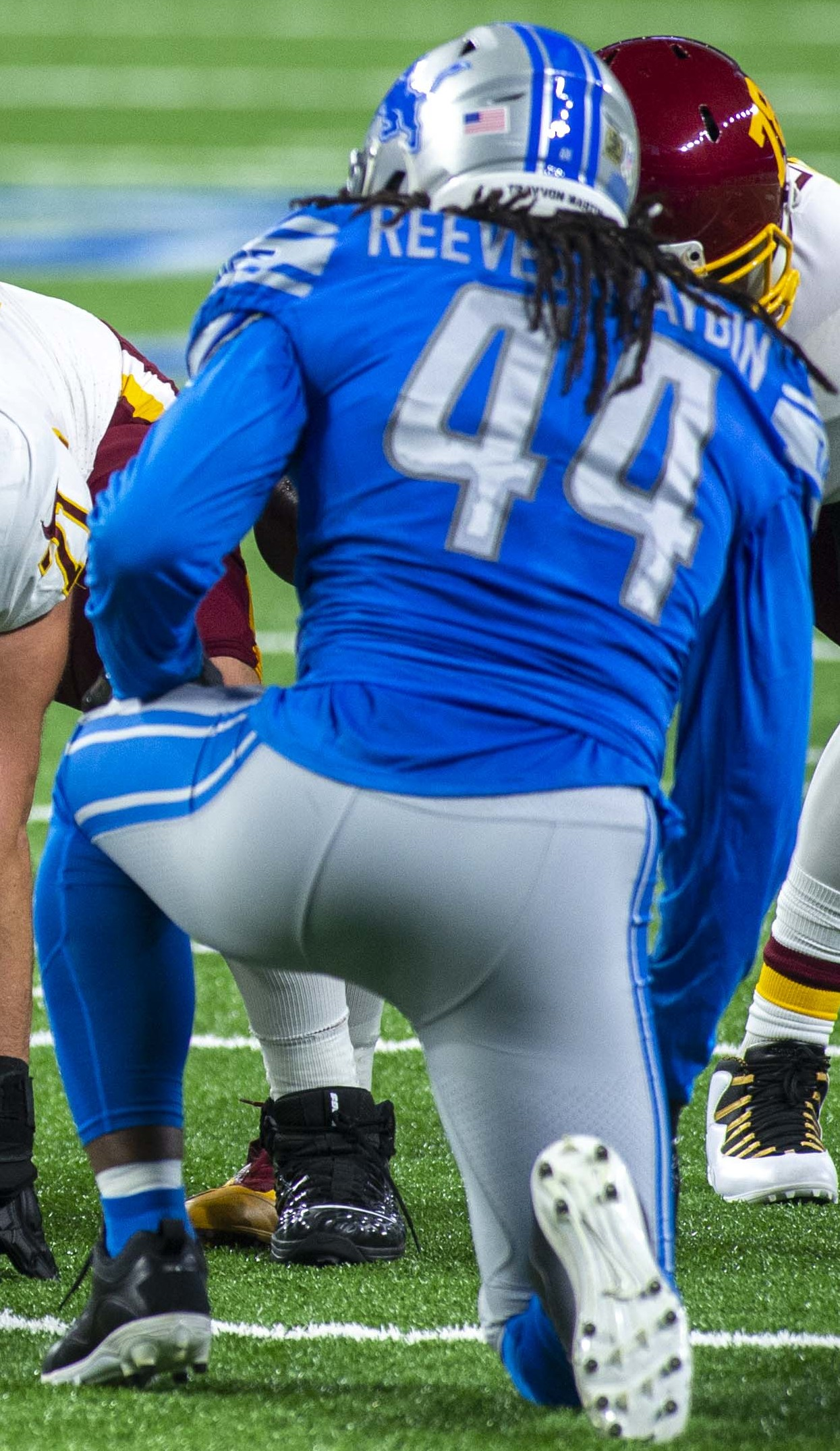
- Reeves-Maybin with the Detroit Lions in 2020

Profile
- Position: Linebacker

Personal information
- Born: January 31, 1995 (age 31); Clarksville, Tennessee, U.S.
- Listed height: 6 ft 0 in (1.83 m)
- Listed weight: 226 lb (103 kg)

Career information
- High school: Northeast (TN)
- College: Tennessee (2013–2016)
- NFL draft: 2017: 4th round, 124th overall pick

Career history
- Detroit Lions (2017–2021); Houston Texans (2022); Detroit Lions (2023–2024); Chicago Bears (2025)

Awards and highlights
- Second-team All-Pro (2023); Pro Bowl (2023); Second-team All-SEC (2015)

Career NFL statistics as of 2025
- Total tackles: 223
- Sacks: 1.5
- Forced fumbles: 5
- Fumble recoveries: 3
- Pass deflections: 8
- Rushing yards: 4
- Passing yards: 31
- Stats at Pro Football Reference

Jalen Ahmad Reeves-Maybin (born January 31, 1995) is an American professional football linebacker and special teamer. He played college football for the Tennessee Volunteers. He was selected by the Lions in the fourth round of the 2017 NFL draft. Reeves-Maybin has served as president of the NFL Players Association (NFLPA) since 2024.

Reeves-Maybin has extensively played on special teams units throughout his career and was selected to his first Pro Bowl and his first All-Pro team in 2023 as a special teamer.

== Early life ==
Reeves-Maybin is the son of LaDawn Reeves and Marques Maybin. He attended Northeast High School in Clarksville, Tennessee. He played high school football for Northeast. He contributed to the team on offense as a quarterback. He gained more than 2,000 rushing yards as a senior, including 1,000 yards in three postseason games, with more than 300 yards in each game. He scored two touchdowns in playoff game against eventual state champion Beech Senior High School. He was named as an All-State selection on defense in 2012 by the Tennessee Sports Writers.

== College career ==
Before the 2013 season, Reeves-Maybin committed to play college football for the University of Tennessee under head coach Butch Jones.

During the 2013 season, Reeves-Maybin, as a true freshman, was a standout on special teams with a team-best 11 tackles. He rotated between linebacker and defensive back, playing in 11 games with 14 tackles on the season. He had at least one tackle on special teams in six games in a row. In the annual rivalry game against the #6 Georgia Bulldogs, he had three tackles and blocked a punt in the third quarter that resulted in a touchdown punt return by teammate Devaun Swafford in the 34–31 overtime loss.

During the 2014 season, Reeves-Maybin started in all 13 games. He finished tied for first on the team with 101 tackles with 11.0 tackles-for-loss. In his first career start, he recorded 10 tackles in the 38–7 victory over Utah State in the 2014 season opener at Neyland Stadium. He made his first-career interception, coming against rival Florida in the third quarter of the 10–9 loss. He posted a career-high 13 tackles in the 2015 TaxSlayer Bowl 45–28 victory over Iowa.

During the 2015 season, Reeves-Maybin started in all 13 games. He finished seventh in overall tackles with 105 and ninth in the Southeastern Conference (SEC) in tackles per game (8.1). He led the team with 14.0 tackles-for-loss, which ranked eighth in the SEC, and second on team in sacks with 5.0. He had six tackles including a 9-yard sack in the 2016 Outback Bowl 45–6 victory over Northwestern. He had a team-high nine tackles including a tackle-for-loss along with the game-sealing fumble recovery in the final minute and an additional forced fumble in the 27–24 victory over rival South Carolina. He had a team-best 11 tackles, including 2.5 tackles-for-loss and a sack in the 19–14 loss at #8 Alabama in the annual rivalry game. He had a career-high 21 tackles, most by a Volunteer since A. J. Johnson in 2012, including 3.0 tackles-for loss in a 2OT loss to #19 Oklahoma. He finished seventh in overall tackles with 105 and ninth in the SEC in tackles per game. He led the team with 14.0 tackles-for-loss, which ranked him eighth in the SEC, and was second on the team in sacks with 6.0.

During the 2016 season, Reeves-Maybin suffered through an injury-plagued senior season. He started only four games, all in the early portion of the schedule. In the season opener against Appalachian State, he was ejected for targeting on a special teams play early in the game. He made 13 tackles and 1.5 tackles-for-loss in the 45–24 victory over Virginia Tech in the 2016 Pilot Flying J Battle at Bristol. In the third game of the season against Ohio, he suffered a left shoulder injury and had to leave the game. The next week, he appeared in the annual rivalry game against #19 Florida before exiting the game due to the injury. On October 18, it was announced that he would be sidelined for the rest of the season.

After the 2016 regular season, Reeves-Maybin declared his intention to enter the 2017 NFL draft.

=== College statistics ===
Year	G	Tackles					Interceptions					Fumbles			
Year	G	Solo	Ast	Tot	Loss	Sk	Int	Yds	Avg	TD	PD	FR	Yds	TD	FF
2013	9	8	6	14	0.0	0.0	0	0		0	0	0			0
2014	13	63	38	101	11.0	2.0	1	1	1.0	0	0	2			0
2015	13	66	39	105	14.0	6.0	0	0		0	4	2			2
2016	4	12	8	20	2.0	0.0	0	0		0	0	0			0
Career	39	149	91	240	27.0	8.0	1	1	1.0	0	4	4			2

== Professional career ==
=== Pre-draft ===
Reeves-Maybin was one of 29 collegiate linebackers to attend the NFL Scouting Combine in Indianapolis, Indiana. He chose to only have measurements taken and met with teams due to a pre-existing shoulder injury. On March 31, 2017, Reeves-Maybin attended Tennessee's pro day and performed all of the positional and combine drills for scouts and team representatives from all 32 NFL teams, including five NFL defensive coordinators and Pittsburgh Steelers' head coach Mike Tomlin. At the conclusion of the pre-draft process, Reeves-Maybin was projected to be a sixth or seventh round pick by NFL draft experts and scouts. He was ranked the 23rd best outside linebacker prospect in the draft by NFLDraftScout.com.

Pre-draft measurables
Height	Weight	Arm length	Hand span	Wingspan	40-yard dash	10-yard split	20-yard split	20-yard shuttle	Three-cone drill	Vertical jump	Broad jump
6 ft 0 3/8 in (1.84 m)	230 lb (104 kg)	32 1/4 in (0.82 m)	9 5/8 in (0.24 m)	6 ft 6 1/4 in (1.99 m)	4.68 s	1.64 s	2.68 s	4.38 s	7.35 s	35.5 in (0.90 m)	9 ft 9 in (2.97 m)
All values from NFL Combine/Tennessee's Pro Day

=== Detroit Lions (first stint) ===
==== 2017 ====
The Detroit Lions selected Reeves-Maybin in the fourth round (124th overall) of the 2017 NFL Draft. He was the 11th linebacker chosen in 2017 and the second linebacker drafted by the Lions, behind first-rounder Jarrad Davis. On May 12, 2017, the Lions signed Reeves-Maybin to a four-year, $3.01 million contract with a signing bonus of $618,887.

Throughout training camp, he competed against Thurston Armbrister, Steve Longa, and Antwione Williams for a role as the backup outside linebacker. Head coach Jim Caldwell named Reeves-Maybin the backup weakside linebacker behind Tahir Whitehead to start the regular season.

He made his professional regular season debut in the Lions' season-opening 35–23 victory over the Arizona Cardinals. On September 18, 2017, he recorded two combined tackles in a 24–10 victory at the New York Giants. In Week 8, Reeves-Maybin collected five combined tackles while playing only 22 defensive snaps in the Lions' 20–15 loss to the Steelers. Reeves-Maybin missed two games (Weeks 10–11) with an ankle injury. On December 10, 2017, he made a season-high six combined tackles, deflected a pass, and made assisted on his first career sack in the Lions' 24–21 victory at the Tampa Bay Buccaneers. He made his first career sack with teammate D. J. Hayden, as they both tackled quarterback Jameis Winston for a nine-yard loss. He finished his rookie season with 30 combined tackles (25 solo), two pass deflections, and was credited with a half a sack in 14 games and zero starts. Head coach Jim Caldwell was fired after the season although the Detroit Lions finished second in the NFC North with a 9–7 record.

==== 2018–2021 ====
In 2018, Reeves-Maybin played in nine games before being placed on injured reserve on December 5, with toe and neck injuries.

In the 2019 season, Reeves-Maybin appeared in all 16 games and recorded 37 total tackles and one forced fumble.

In the 2020 season, Reeves-Maybin appeared in all 16 games and recorded ten total tackles.

On March 17, 2021, Reeves-Maybin re-signed with the Lions. In the 2021 season, he finished with 82 total tackles, four passes defeflected, and two forced fumbles in 15 games.

=== Houston Texans ===
On March 23, 2022, Reeves-Maybin signed a two-year contract with the Houston Texans. In the 2022 season, he appeared in all 17 games, mainly in a special teams role. He was released on March 16, 2023.

=== Detroit Lions (second stint) ===
On March 23, 2023, Reeves-Maybin signed a one-year deal with the Lions. In the 2023 regular season opener against the Kansas City Chiefs, he converted a first down for the Lions on a fake punt in the first quarter. In Week 13, Reeves-Maybin recorded four special teams tackles in a 33–28 win over the New Orleans Saints, earning National Football Conference Special Teams Player of the Week. In Week 17 against the Dallas Cowboys, Reeves–Maybin was part of a trick play in which he converted a 31-yard fake punt pass to Khalil Dorsey to keep the Lions' drive alive. On January 3, 2024, it was announced that Reeves-Maybin would be invited to the 2024 Pro Bowl games along with four other Lions teammates. He was voted as the NFC's sole special teams player representative. In the 2023 season, he mainly played on special teams but had an increased role on the defense in the last six regular season games.

On February 26, 2024, Reeves-Maybin signed a two–year, $7.5 million contract extension with the Lions. In the 2024 season, he appeared in ten games. He had a role on defense and special teams.

On March 12, 2025, the Lions released Reeves-Maybin in a move to reportedly clear up cap space.

=== Chicago Bears ===
Reeves-Maybin was signed to the Chicago Bears' practice squad on November 18, 2025. On January 13, 2026, he was signed to the active roster. He appeared in three regular season games and two playoff games for the Bears in the 2025 season.

== Personal life ==
Reeves-Maybin is the cousin of former MLB outfielder Cameron Maybin.

Additionally, he is the son of former Louisville Cardinals standout basketball player Marques Maybin. Marques was a shooting guard at the University of Louisville from 1997–2001.

On March 16, 2024, Reeves-Maybin was elected to a two-year term as president of the NFL Players Association (NFLPA). On March 15, 2026, Reeves-Maybin was re-elected for a second two-year term.
