= Jalen Hurd =

American football player (born 1996)

No. 17, 14, 13
- Position: Wide receiver

Personal information
- Born: January 23, 1996 (age 30); Hendersonville, Tennessee, U.S.
- Listed height: 6 ft 5 in (1.96 m)
- Listed weight: 230 lb (104 kg)

Career information
- High school: Beech (Hendersonville)
- College: Tennessee (2014–2016); Baylor (2017–2018)
- NFL draft: 2019: 3rd round, 67th overall pick

Career history
- San Francisco 49ers (2019–2021); New England Patriots (2023)*
- * Offseason or practice squad member only

Awards and highlights
- Big 12 Offensive Newcomer of the Year (2018); Outback Bowl MVP (2016); Second-team All-SEC (2015)
- Stats at Pro Football Reference

Jalen Tyler Hurd (born January 23, 1996) is an American former professional football wide receiver. He played college football at the University of Tennessee for three years and Baylor for one year. Hurd was selected by the San Francisco 49ers in the third round of the 2019 NFL draft.

== Early life ==
Hurd played football at Beech Senior High School in Hendersonville, Tennessee. As a junior in 2012, he rushed for a Tennessee state record 3,357 yards with 43 touchdowns. In the state championship game of his junior season, Hurd rushed for a Tennessee state championship record 394 yards and seven touchdowns leading his team to victory. Hurd only played in one game as a senior after suffering a shoulder injury against Station Camp High School.

In track and field, Hurd competed in hurdles (41.15 seconds in the 300m hurdles) and sprints (23.34 in the 200-meter dash and 51.79 in the 400-meter dash).

Hurd was rated by the Rivals.com recruiting network as a five-star recruit and ranked among the top running backs in the Class of 2014. He committed to the University of Tennessee to play college football under head coach Butch Jones.

In 2015, Beech Senior High School retired his No. 18 jersey.

== College career ==
=== University of Tennessee ===
==== 2014 season ====
In 2014, Hurd appeared in 13 games and made nine starts as a true freshman at Tennessee. He shared the backfield with Marlin Lane, Devrin Young and Justus Pickett. He had 11 carries for 29 yards, two receptions for 16 yards and a 15-yard touchdown reception in a 38–7 win against Utah State. In a 34–19 victory over Arkansas State, Hurd had 23 carries for 83 rushing yards and a rushing touchdown. Against No. 4 Oklahoma, he had 97 rushing yards and 24 receiving yards in the 34–10 loss. Hurd had 24 carries for 119 rushing yards in a 35–32 loss against No. 12 Georgia. Hurd fumbled and the ball was recovered by Georgia defender Josh Dawson for a touchdown. He gained 39 rushing yards in a 10–9 loss to the Florida Gators, seven rushing yards against the Chattanooga Mocs, and 40 rushing yards against Ole Miss. Hurd had 16 carries for 59 yards and six receptions for 27 yards in a 34–20 loss against the No. 4 Alabama Crimson Tide. Hurd had 21 carries for 125 rushing yards, seven receptions for 58 yards and a receiving touchdown in a 45–42 double-overtime victory over South Carolina. In a 50–16 victory over Kentucky, Hurd had 118 rushing yards and a rushing touchdown. Hurd had rushed for 40 yards and had 40 receiving yards in a 29–21 loss to Missouri. In a 24–17 victory Vanderbilt, he carried the ball five times for 21 yards. Tennessee finished with a 6–6 record and earned its first appearance in a bowl game since the 2010 season. In the 2015 TaxSlayer Bowl, Hurd had 16 carries for 122 yards and two touchdowns in a 45–28 victory. He finished the 2014 season with 899 rushing yards on 190 carries and five touchdowns.

==== 2015 season ====
Hurd shared the backfield with transfer Alvin Kamara and true freshman John Kelly in the 2015 season. He had 23 carries for 123 rushing yards and three rushing touchdowns in a 59–30 victory against Bowling Green. In a 31–24 double-overtime loss to No. 19 Oklahoma, Hurd had 24 carries for 106 rushing yards and a rushing touchdown. He rushed for 68 yards, had two receptions for 12 yards and scored a receiving touchdown and a rushing touchdown in a 55–10 victory over Western Carolina. In a 28–27 loss to the Florida Gators, he had 102 rushing yards and two rushing touchdowns. Over the next six games, Hurd totaled 485 rushing yards and three rushing touchdowns. He had 80 rushing yards in a 38–31 victory over No. 19 Georgia and 92 rushing yards and a rushing touchdown in a 19–14 loss to No. 8 Alabama. In the 2015 Missouri game, he ran for a career-high 151 yards, which put him greater than 1,000 yards for the season, in a 19–8 victory. Hurd had 120 rushing yards and a touchdown in a 53–28 victory against the Vanderbilt Commodores. Tennessee finished the season with a 9–4 record and played against No. 12 Northwestern Wildcats in the 2016 Outback Bowl. In a 45–6 victory, Hurd was named Most Valuable Player after gaining 24 carries for 130 rushing yards and a rushing touchdown. He finished the regular season with 1,158 yards, the 12th most recorded by a Tennessee running back and the most since 2007.

==== 2016 season ====
Hurd started his junior season with 28 carries for 110 rushing yards in a 20–13 overtime victory over Appalachian State after recovering a Joshua Dobbs fumble for a touchdown. In the 2016 Pilot Flying J Battle at Bristol against Virginia Tech, he had 22 carries for 99 yards in a 45–24 victory. In a 38–28 victory over No. 19 Florida, Hurd had 26 carries for 95 yards and two receptions for 25 yards and a receiving touchdown. Hurd was sidelined with a head injury suffered against Georgia. After the game against South Carolina, head coach Butch Jones announced that Hurd would transfer schools. Hurd finished his Tennessee career with 2,638 rushing yards, 20 rushing touchdowns, 67 receptions, 492 receiving yards, and six receiving touchdowns. He finished sixth in school history in rushing yards.

=== Baylor University ===
==== 2017 season ====
On April 22, 2017, Hurd announced he would transfer to Baylor University, requiring him to sit out the 2017 season.

==== 2018 season ====
At Baylor, after moving from running back to wide receiver, Hurd had three games with at least 100 receiving yards. He had 136 receiving yards and a receiving touchdown against UTSA, 104 receiving yards and a receiving touchdown against Oklahoma, and 135 receiving yards against Kansas State. He finished the season with 69 receptions for 946 receiving yards and four receiving touchdowns with 48 carries for 209 rushing yards and three rushing touchdowns. After injuring his knee in the season finale, Hurd was unable to play in the Texas Bowl against Vanderbilt. Hurd was named Big 12 Conference Offensive Newcomer of the Year.

=== College statistics ===
Jalen Hurd						Rushing				Receiving			
Season	Team	Conf	Class	Pos	GP	Att	Yds	Avg	TD	Rec	Yds	Avg	TD
2014	Tennessee	SEC	FR	RB	13	190	899	4.7	5	35	221	6.3	2
2015	Tennessee	SEC	SO	RB	13	277	1,285	4.6	12	22	190	8.6	2
2016	Tennessee	SEC	JR	RB	7	122	451	3.7	3	10	81	8.1	2
2018	Baylor	Big 12	SR	WR	12	48	209	4.4	3	69	946	13.7	4
Career					45	637	2,844	4.5	23	136	1,438	10.6	10

== Professional career ==
Pre-draft measurables
Height	Weight	Arm length	Hand span	Bench press
6 ft 4 3/4 in (1.95 m)	226 lb (103 kg)	32 in (0.81 m)	10 1/4 in (0.26 m)	23 reps
All values from NFL Combine

=== San Francisco 49ers ===
Hurd was drafted by the San Francisco 49ers in the third round (67th overall) in the 2019 NFL draft. He was placed on injured reserve on October 3, 2019, with a back injury and was unable to play as a rookie.

Hurd was placed on injured reserve for a second consecutive season on August 20, 2020, after he tore his ACL during a running drill at training camp, ending his 2020 season before it even started.

On September 11, 2021, Hurd was placed on injured reserve with a knee injury. He was released on November 11, after spending each of his three seasons on injured reserve and never taking a regular season snap with the 49ers.

=== New England Patriots ===
On July 25, 2023, Hurd signed with the New England Patriots.

=== Retirement ===
On August 1, 2023, Hurd announced his retirement from professional football.
