= Marlin Lane =

American football player (born 1991)

Marlin Lane Jr.
No. 15
- Position: Running back

Personal information
- Born: December 31, 1991 (age 34); Daytona Beach, Florida, U.S.
- Listed height: 5 ft 11 in (1.80 m)
- Listed weight: 209 lb (95 kg)

Career information
- High school: Mainland
- College: Tennessee
- NFL draft: 2015: undrafted

Marlin A. Lane Jr. (born December 31, 1991) is an American former football running back. He played college football at Tennessee.

== Early life ==
Lane is the son of Marlin Lane Sr. and Milinia Williams. He attended Mainland High School, where he played high school football for the Buccaneers. As a sophomore, he had 69 carries for 758 yards and 12 touchdowns. In addition, he caught six passes for 123 yards and a touchdown. As a junior, he had 112 carries for 1,110 yards and twelve touchdowns. As a senior, he played in only five games due to coming off of ACL surgery. He recorded 601 yards and six touchdowns on the season. He was rated as a four-star recruit by Rivals.com and Scout.com recruiting networks.

== College career ==
Before the 2011 season, Lane committed to the University of Tennessee to play under head coach Derek Dooley.

=== 2011 season ===
As a true freshman, Lane was an instant contributor for the Volunteers. He shared the backfield with Tauren Poole and Rajion Neal among others. He made his collegiate debut on September 3, in a 42–16 victory over Montana. In the game, he had 10 carries for 35 yards and a rushing touchdown. In addition, he had two receptions for 16 yards and a receiving touchdown. In the next game against Cincinnati, he had eight carries for 16 yards and another touchdown in the 45–23 victory. On October 8, against their SEC East rival Georgia Bulldogs, he had six receptions for 84 yards in the 20–12 loss. Overall, in his freshman season, he had 280 rushing yards, two rushing touchdowns, 17 receptions, 161 receiving yards, and two receiving touchdowns.

=== 2012 season ===
As a sophomore, Lane and Neal were the two primary running backs with the loss of Poole to the 2012 NFL draft. His role in the offense expanded in the 2012 season. He started the year off with 75 rushing yards and 21 receiving yards in a 35–21 victory over North Carolina State. On November 3, he had a career day against Troy with 19 carries for 132 yards and two touchdowns in the 55–48 victory. On November 17, he had 108 rushing yards against rival Vanderbilt in the 41–18 loss. After the Vanderbilt game, his head coach, Derek Dooley, was fired. Overall, he had 120 carries, 658 yards, two rushing touchdowns, 29 receptions, and 228 receiving yards in the 2012 season.

=== 2013 season ===
Lane entered the 2013 season with a new head coach, Butch Jones. The running back personnel situation was similar from the year before with both Neal and Lane returning. He started the year off strong against Austin Peay with 38 rushing yards and two rushing touchdowns in the 45–0 victory. In the next game against Western Kentucky, he had 97 rushing yards and another touchdown in the 52–20 victory. Overall, in his junior season, he had 101 carries, 534 rushing yards, four rushing touchdowns, nine receptions, and 50 receiving yards.

=== 2014 season ===
In 2014, as a senior, Lane shared the backfield with five-star recruit freshman Jalen Hurd and junior transfer Justus Pickett among others. With Hurd taking over a significant role in the offense, Lane's numbers decreased but he still contributed. In the season opener against Utah State, he had 41 rushing yards and a rushing touchdown in the 38–7 victory. In the game against Vanderbilt later in the season, he played a key role in helping Tennessee control the field position in a bowl-appearance clinching 24–17 victory. As a senior, Lane appeared in a bowl game for the first time in his collegiate career. In the 2015 TaxSlayer Bowl against Iowa, he threw a 49-yard touchdown reception to wide receiver Vic Wharton III on a halfback-screen in his final collegiate game, a 45–28 victory.

==== Collegiate statistics ====
| Marlin Lane | | Rushing | | | | Receiving | | | |
|---|---|---|---|---|---|---|---|---|---|
| Year | G | Rush | Yds | Avg | TD | Rec | Yds | Avg | TD |
| 2011 | 12 | 75 | 280 | 3.7 | 2 | 17 | 161 | 9.5 | 2 |
| 2012 | 12 | 120 | 658 | 5.5 | 2 | 29 | 228 | 7.9 | 0 |
| 2013 | 11 | 101 | 534 | 5.3 | 4 | 9 | 50 | 5.6 | 0 |
| 2014 | 12 | 86 | 300 | 3.5 | 1 | 11 | 78 | 7.1 | 0 |
| Career | 47 | 382 | 1,772 | 4.6 | 9 | 66 | 517 | 7.8 | 2 |

== Professional career ==
Lane went undrafted in the 2015 NFL draft. In May 2015, he attended rookie minicamp on a tryout basis with the Miami Dolphins.
