= Brian Randolph =

American football player (born 1992)

No. 43, 37
- Position: Safety

Personal information
- Born: October 20, 1992 (age 34); Marietta, Georgia, U.S.
- Listed height: 6 ft 0 in (1.83 m)
- Listed weight: 198 lb (90 kg)

Career information
- High school: Carlton J. Kell (Marietta, Georgia)
- College: Tennessee (2011–2015)
- NFL draft: 2016: undrafted

Career history
- Los Angeles Rams (2016)
- Stats at Pro Football Reference

Brian Anthony Randolph (born October 20, 1992) is an American former football safety. He played college football at Tennessee.

== Early life ==
Randolph is the son of Mark and Lisa Randolph. He attended Kell High School in Marietta, Georgia, where he played high school football for the Longhorns.

== College career ==
Before the 2011 season, Randolph committed to the University of Tennessee to play under coach Derek Dooley. He played at Tennessee from 2011 to 2015 having redshirted in the 2012 season due to injury.

As a freshman in the 2011 season, Randolph appeared in 12 games and started in eight. He was utilized as a free safety and in nickel coverage. He finished fifth on the team with 55 tackles, which was the fifth-most in Tennessee history. As a sophomore in the 2012 season, Randolph appeared in three games as a starter. He was injured in the third game of the season against the Florida Gators. The injury was season-ending and he was granted a redshirt. Randolph returned from his injury in 2013 under new head coach Butch Jones. He appeared and started in all 12 games for the Volunteers. He started as a strong safety in 2013. He finished second on the team in tackles with 75, first in interceptions with four, and third in passes defended with seven. As a redshirt junior in 2014, Randolph would put together a solid campaign for the Volunteers. He appeared in all 13 games and started 11 of them. He finished third on the team in tackles with 88. Also, he had two interceptions, five passes defended, and a fumble recovery. He recovered a fumble along with two tackles in 2015 TaxSlayer Bowl victory over Iowa. In his final season with the Volunteers, Randolph appeared in and started all 13 games. He was a starter in the secondary and finished second on the team in tackles with 70. Also, he had five passes defended, two interceptions, and a forced fumble. He had a team-high nine tackles and a very crucial pass break-up on the final play against #19 Georgia. He became Tennessee's all-time career games leader in history with 53 games by appearing in the Outback Bowl victory over Northwestern.

== Professional career ==
Randolph signed with the Los Angeles Rams as an undrafted free agent on May 4, 2016. He tore his ACL in the first preseason game and was placed on injured reserve on August 15, 2016.

On June 21, 2017, Randolph was waived by the Rams.
