= 2015 TaxSlayer Bowl =

- 70th Gator Bowl
Iowa Hawkeyes	Tennessee Volunteers
(7–5)	(6–6)
Big Ten	SEC
28	45
Head coach: Kirk Ferentz	Head coach: Butch Jones
	1	2	3	4	Total
Iowa	0	7	0	21	28
Tennessee	21	14	7	3	45
- Date: January 2, 2015
- Season: 2014
- Stadium: EverBank Field
- Location: Jacksonville, Florida
- MVP: Joshua Dobbs (QB, Tennessee) & Josey Jewell (LB, Iowa)
- Favorite: Tennessee by 3.5
- Referee: Mike Mothershed (Pac-12)
- Halftime show: Pride of The Southland Marching Band
- Attendance: 56,310

United States TV coverage
- Network: ESPN/ESPN Radio
- Announcers: Mark Jones, Rod Gilmore, and Jessica Mendoza (ESPN); Adam Amin, John Congemi, & Dawn Davenport (ESPN Radio)

The 2015 TaxSlayer Bowl was an American college football bowl game played on January 2, 2015, at EverBank Field in Jacksonville, Florida. The 70th edition of the Gator Bowl featured the Iowa Hawkeyes from the Big Ten Conference and the Tennessee Volunteers of the Southeastern Conference. The game was one of the 2014–15 NCAA football bowl games that concluded the 2014 NCAA Division I FBS football season. The game began at 3:20 p.m. EST and was nationally televised by ESPN. It was sponsored by tax preparation software company TaxSlayer.com, and for sponsorship reasons was officially known as the TaxSlayer Bowl.

== Teams ==
This was the third overall meeting between these two teams, with the series tied 1–1. The previous time these two teams met was in 1987. The only other bowl game these two played against each other was the 1982 Peach Bowl, which Iowa won 28–22.

The Volunteers took the momentum early, scoring on their first four possessions and leading 28–0 before Iowa managed to reach 70 yards. Sophomore quarterback and game MVP Joshua Dobbs ran for two touchdowns and threw for another as the Vols posted their first winning season since going 7–6 in 2009, and earned its first postseason victory since the Phillip Fulmer era, the last being the 2008 Outback Bowl over the Wisconsin Badgers.

== Game summary ==
=== Scoring summary ===
Scoring summary

Quarter	Time	Drive			Team	Scoring information	Score	
Quarter	Time	Plays	Yards	TOP	Team	Scoring information	IOWA	TENN
1	9:27	9	80	3:28	TENN	Jalen Hurd 3-yard touchdown run, Aaron Medley kick good	0	7
1	2:54	5	67	1:41	TENN	Jalen Hurd 29-yard touchdown run, Aaron Medley kick good	0	14
1	1:31	1	49	0:13	TENN	Vic Wharton 49-yard touchdown reception from Marlin Lane, Aaron Medley kick good	0	21
2	12:02	8	62	3:23	TENN	Joshua Dobbs 8-yard touchdown run, Aaron Medley kick good	0	28
2	3:43	9	71	4:30	IOWA	Mark Weisman 3-yard touchdown run, Marshall Koehn kick good	7	28
2	0:21	9	75	3:22	TENN	Von Pearson 19-yard touchdown reception from Joshua Dobbs, Aaron Medley kick good	7	35
3	7:46	9	75	3:13	TENN	Joshua Dobbs 11-yard touchdown run, Aaron Medley kick good	7	42
4	14:29	4	46	1:24	IOWA	Mark Weisman 1-yard touchdown run, Marshall Koehn kick good	14	42
4	8:31	11	34	5:58	TENN	28-yard field goal by Aaron Medley	14	45
4	3:30	6	80	2:13	IOWA	Ray Hamilton 31-yard touchdown reception from C. J. Beathard, Marshall Koehn kick good	21	45
4	0:20	4	75	1:02	IOWA	Matt VandeBerg 18-yard touchdown reception from C. J. Beathard, Marshall Koehn kick good	28	45
"TOP" = time of possession. For other American football terms, see Glossary of American football.							28	45

=== Statistics ===
Statistics	Iowa	TENN
First downs	23	27
Plays–yards	66–421	73–461
Rushes–yards	35–244	51–283
Passing yards	177	178
Passing: Comp–Att–Int	15–31–1	17–22–1
Time of possession	27:52	32:08
