= 2014 Iowa Hawkeyes football team =

American college football season

2014 Iowa Hawkeyes football

TaxSlayer Bowl, L 28–45 vs. Tennessee
- Conference: Big Ten Conference
- West Division
- Record: 7–6 (4–4 Big Ten)
- Head coach: Kirk Ferentz (16th season)
- Offensive coordinator: Greg Davis (3rd season)
- Offensive scheme: Multiple
- Defensive coordinator: Phil Parker (3rd season)
- Base defense: 4–3
- Home stadium: Kinnick Stadium

2014 Big Ten Conference football standings
	Conf.			Overall
Team	W		L	W		L
East Division
No. 1 Ohio State x$#^	8	–	0	14	–	1
No. T–5 Michigan State	7	–	1	11	–	2
Maryland	4	–	4	7	–	6
Rutgers	3	–	5	8	–	5
Michigan	3	–	5	5	–	7
Penn State	2	–	6	7	–	6
Indiana	1	–	7	4	–	8
West Division
No. 13 Wisconsin x	7	–	1	11	–	3
Minnesota	5	–	3	8	–	5
Nebraska	5	–	3	9	–	4
Iowa	4	–	4	7	–	6
Illinois	3	–	5	6	–	7
Northwestern	3	–	5	5	–	7
Purdue	1	–	7	3	–	9
Championship: Ohio State 59, Wisconsin 0
# – College Football Playoff champion; ^ – College Football Playoff participant; $ – Conference champion; x – Division champion/co-champions; Rankings from AP Poll

The 2014 Iowa Hawkeyes football team represented the University of Iowa in the 2014 NCAA Division I FBS football season. They were led by 16th-year head coach Kirk Ferentz and played their home games at Kinnick Stadium. They were a member of the new West Division of the Big Ten Conference. They finished the season 7–6, 4–4 in Big Ten play to finish in fourth place in the West Division. They were invited to the TaxSlayer Bowl where they lost to Tennessee.

== 2014 commitments ==
College recruiting
Name	Hometown	School	Height	Weight	40^{‡}	Commit date
Mick Ellis; K	Allen, TX	Lovejoy High School	5 ft 9 in (1.75 m)	186 lb (84 kg)	4.6	Jul 8, 2013
Mick Ellis; K	Recruit ratings: Scout: Rivals: 247Sports: ESPN:					
Jalen Embry; CB	Detroit, MI	Martin Luther King High School	5 ft 11 in (1.80 m)	179 lb (81 kg)	4.6	Oct 6, 2013
Jalen Embry; CB	Recruit ratings: Scout: Rivals: 247Sports: ESPN:					
Terrence Harris; DE	Paramus, NJ	Paramus Catholic High School	6 ft 2 in (1.88 m)	248 lb (112 kg)	4.7	Jul 16, 2013
Terrence Harris; DE	Recruit ratings: Scout: Rivals: 247Sports: ESPN:					
Torey Hendrick; DE	Brooklyn, NY	ASA College	6 ft 4 in (1.93 m)	235 lb (107 kg)	NA	Jan 28, 2014
Torey Hendrick; DE	Recruit ratings: Scout: Rivals: 247Sports: ESPN:					
Parker Hesse; OLB	Waukon, IA	Waukon High School	6 ft 3 in (1.91 m)	206 lb (93 kg)	4.7	Nov 25, 2013
Parker Hesse; OLB	Recruit ratings: Scout: Rivals: 247Sports: ESPN:					
CJ Hilliard; RB	Cincinnati, OH	St. Xavier High School	5 ft 10 in (1.78 m)	186 lb (84 kg)	4.6	Jun 6, 2013
CJ Hilliard; RB	Recruit ratings: Scout: Rivals: 247Sports: ESPN:					
Josh Jackson; CB	Corinth, TX	Lake Dallas High School	6 ft 0 in (1.83 m)	173 lb (78 kg)	4.5	Aug 22, 2013
Josh Jackson; CB	Recruit ratings: Scout: Rivals: 247Sports: ESPN:					
Marcel Joly; CB	Forestville, MD	Forestville High School	5 ft 11 in (1.80 m)	182 lb (83 kg)	4.5	Sep 23, 2013
Marcel Joly; CB	Recruit ratings: Scout: Rivals: 247Sports: ESPN:					
Dillon Kidd; K	Torrance, CA	El Camino	6 ft 1 in (1.85 m)	210 lb (95 kg)	4.7	Jan 9, 2014
Dillon Kidd; K	Recruit ratings: Scout: Rivals: 247Sports: ESPN:					
Lucas LeGrand; OT	Dubuque, IA	Dubuque Senior High School	6 ft 5 in (1.96 m)	260 lb (120 kg)	5.0	Apr 3, 2013
Lucas LeGrand; OT	Recruit ratings: Scout: Rivals: 247Sports: ESPN:					
Aaron Mends; OLB	Kansas City, MO	Winnetonka High School	6 ft 0 in (1.83 m)	203 lb (92 kg)	4.6	Aug 17, 2013
Aaron Mends; OLB	Recruit ratings: Scout: Rivals: 247Sports: ESPN:					
Matt Nelson; TE	Cedar Rapids, IA	Xavier High School	6 ft 7 in (2.01 m)	245 lb (111 kg)	4.9	Jun 27, 2013
Matt Nelson; TE	Recruit ratings: Scout: Rivals: 247Sports: ESPN:					
Ben Niemann; OLB	Sycamore, IL	Sycamore High School	6 ft 3 in (1.91 m)	195 lb (88 kg)	4.5	Jul 20, 2013
Ben Niemann; OLB	Recruit ratings: Scout: Rivals: 247Sports: ESPN:					
Jameer Outsey; DE	Somerset, NJ	Franklin High School	6 ft 3 in (1.91 m)	215 lb (98 kg)	4.8	Jun 21, 2013
Jameer Outsey; DE	Recruit ratings: Scout: Rivals: 247Sports: ESPN:					
Keegan Render; OG	Indianola, IA	Indianola High School	6 ft 4 in (1.93 m)	308 lb (140 kg)	5.2	Jun 22, 2013
Keegan Render; OG	Recruit ratings: Scout: Rivals: 247Sports: ESPN:					
Ross Reynolds; OG	Waukee, IA	Waukee Senior High School	6 ft 4 in (1.93 m)	288 lb (131 kg)	NA	Jan 26, 2014
Ross Reynolds; OG	Recruit ratings: Scout: Rivals: 247Sports: ESPN:					
Jay Scheel; WR	La Porte City, IA	Union High School	6 ft 1 in (1.85 m)	170 lb (77 kg)	4.5	Jan 20, 2013
Jay Scheel; WR	Recruit ratings: Scout: Rivals: 247Sports: ESPN:					
Markel Smith; RB	St. Louis, MO	St. John Vianney High School	5 ft 11 in (1.80 m)	210 lb (95 kg)	4.7	Nov 5, 2014
Markel Smith; RB	Recruit ratings: Scout: Rivals: 247Sports: ESPN:					
Miles Taylor; S	Washington, DC	Gonzaga College High School	6 ft 0 in (1.83 m)	185 lb (84 kg)	4.5	Jan 26, 2014
Miles Taylor; S	Recruit ratings: Scout: Rivals: 247Sports: ESPN:					
Kyle Terlouw; DT	Fort Dodge, IA	Iowa Central Community College	6 ft 3 in (1.91 m)	290 lb (130 kg)	NA	Mar 5, 2014
Kyle Terlouw; DT	Recruit ratings: Scout: Rivals: 247Sports: ESPN:					
Omar Truitt; CB	Washington, DC	St. John's College High School	5 ft 11 in (1.80 m)	181 lb (82 kg)	4.5	Jun 3, 2013
Omar Truitt; CB	Recruit ratings: Scout: Rivals: 247Sports: ESPN:					
Tyler Wiegers; QB	Beverly Hills, MI	Detroit Country Day School	6 ft 3 in (1.91 m)	197 lb (89 kg)	4.7	Dec 20, 2013
Tyler Wiegers; QB	Recruit ratings: Scout: Rivals: 247Sports: ESPN:					
Overall recruit ranking: Scout: 39 Rivals: 59 247Sports: 55 ESPN: 53
Note: In many cases, Scout, Rivals, 247Sports, On3, and ESPN may conflict in their listings of height and weight.; In these cases, the average was taken. ESPN grades are on a 100-point scale.; Sources: "ESPN- College Football Recruiting Schools". ESPN.; "2014 Team Ranking". Rivals.com.

== Schedule ==
Date	Time	Opponent	Site	TV	Result	Attendance
August 30	11:00 a.m.	No. 9 (FCS) Northern Iowa*	Kinnick Stadium; Iowa City, IA	BTN	W 31–23	66,805
September 6	2:30 p.m.	Ball State*	Kinnick Stadium; Iowa City, IA	ESPN2	W 17–13	64,210
September 13	2:30 p.m.	Iowa State*	Kinnick Stadium; Iowa City, IA (Cy-Hawk Trophy)	ESPN	L 17–20	70,585
September 20	11:00 a.m.	at Pittsburgh*	Heinz Field; Pittsburgh, PA	ESPNU	W 24–20	48,895
September 27	11:00 a.m.	at Purdue	Ross–Ade Stadium; West Lafayette, IN	BTN	W 24–10	36,603
October 11	11:00 a.m.	Indiana^{†}	Kinnick Stadium; Iowa City, IA	ESPNU	W 45–29	68,590
October 18	11:00 a.m.	at Maryland	Byrd Stadium; College Park, MD	ESPN2	L 31–38	48,373
November 1	11:00 a.m.	Northwestern	Kinnick Stadium; Iowa City, IA	BTN	W 48–7	66,887
November 8	11:00 a.m.	at Minnesota	TCF Bank Stadium; Minneapolis, MN (Floyd of Rosedale)	ESPN2	L 14–51	49,680
November 15	11:00 a.m.	at Illinois	Memorial Stadium; Champaign, IL	BTN	W 30–14	50,373
November 22	2:30 p.m.	No. 14 Wisconsin	Kinnick Stadium; Iowa City, IA (Heartland Trophy)	ABC/ESPN2	L 24–26	68,610
November 28	11:00 a.m.	Nebraska	Kinnick Stadium; Iowa City, IA (Heroes Game)	ABC	L 34–37 ^{OT}	66,897
January 2	2:20 p.m.	vs. Tennessee*	EverBank Field; Jacksonville, FL (TaxSlayer Bowl)	ESPN	L 28–45	56,310
*Non-conference game; ^{†}Homecoming; Rankings from AP Poll released prior to the game; All times are in Central time

== Roster ==
2014 Iowa Hawkeyes football team roster
Players
Coaches
Offense

Pos.	#	Name	Class
QB	16	C.J. Beathard	So
QB	6	Justin Joyce	Fr
QB	15	Jake Rudock	Jr
RB	5	Damon Bullock	Sr
RB	33	Jordan Canzeri	Jr
RB	34	Adam Cox	Jr
RB	29	LeShun Daniels Jr.	So
RB	35	C.J. Hilliard	Fr
RB	31	Aaron Mends	Fr
RB	10	Jonathan Parker	Fr
RB	42	Macon Plewa	Jr
RB	25	Akrum Wadley	Fr
RB	45	Mark Weisman	Sr
RB	32	Andrew Wellik	Fr
WR	21	Trey Hadachek	Fr
WR	84	Andre Harris	Fr
WR	84	Jacob Hillyer	So
WR	14	Conner Keane	Fr
WR	11	Kevonte Martin-Manley	Sr
WR	83	Riley McCarron	So
WR	85	Derrick Mitchell, Jr.	Fr
WR	22	Damond Powell	Sr
WR	86	Jay Scheel	Fr
WR	81	Tevaun Smith	Jr
WR	20	Andrew Stone	Sr
WR	89	Matt VandeBerg	So
WR	18	Derrick Willies	Fr
WR	7	Drew Zaun	Sr
TE	87	Jake Duzey	So
TE	82	Ray Hamilton	Sr
TE	46	George Kittle	So
TE	80	Henry Krieger-Coble	Jr
TE	92	Peter Pekar	Fr
TE	81	Jon Wisnieski	Fr
OL	63	Austin Blythe	Jr
OL	75	Ike Boettger	Fr
OL	60	Jalen Chambers	So
OL	64	Cole Croston	So
OL	78	Andrew Donnal	Sr
OL	54	Steve Ferentz	So
OL	76	Dalton Ferguson	Fr
OL	57	Tommy Gaul	Sr
OL	66	Colin Goebel	Fr
OL	74	Mitch Keppy	So
OL	70	Lucas LeGrand	Fr
OL	52	Boone Myers	Fr
OL	69	Keegan Render	Fr
OL	59	Ross Reynolds	Fr
OL	68	Brandon Scherff	Sr
OL	77	Reid Sealby	So
OL	58	Eric Simmons	Jr
OL	65	Jordan Walsh	Jr
OL	73	Ryan Ward	So
OL	79	Sean Welsh	Fr

Defense

Pos.	#	Name	Class
DL	99	Nathan Bazata	Fr
DL	90	Sam Brincks	Fr
DL	97	Darian Cooper	Jr
DL	71	Carl Davis	Sr
DL	56	Faith Ekakitie	So
DL	77	Daniel Gaffney	Fr
DL	72	Brant Gressel	Fr
DL	98	Mike Hardy	Sr
DL	93	Terrence Harris	Fr
DL	88	Jake Hulett	Fr
DL	67	Jaleel Johnson	So
DL	92	Will Kincart	So
DL	94	Riley McMinn	Jr
DL	34	Nate Meier	Jr
DL	96	Matt Nelson
DL	95	Drew Ott	Jr
DL	87	Wil Rathjen	Sr
DL	61	Kyle Terlouw	Jr
DL	90	Louis Trinca-Pasat	Sr
DL	75	Dean Tsopanides	Jr
DL	91	Daumantas Venckus-Cucchiara	So
LB	52	Quinton Alston	Sr
LB	41	Bo Bower	So
LB	36	Cole Fisher	Jr
LB	46	Chad Gilson	Sr
LB	45	Eric Grimm	Fr
LB	40	Parker Hesse	Fr
LB	43	Josey Jewell	Fr
LB	47	John Kenny	Fr
LB	54	Drake Kulick	Fr
LB	48	Luke Lindahl	Fr
LB	15	Steve Manders	Fr
LB	44	Ben Niemann
LB	20	Jameer Outsey	Fr
LB	6	Reggie Spearman	So
LB	49	Melvin Spears	Jr
DB	7	Sean Draper	Jr
DB	28	Marcus Fleming	So
DB	12	Anthony Gair	So
DB	30	Jake Gervase	Fr
DB	15	Joshua Jackson	Fr
DB	8	Marcel Joly	Fr
DB	14	Desmond King	So
DB	27	Jordan Lomax	Jr
DB	37	John Lowdermilk	Sr
DB	13	Greg Mabin	So
DB	39	Travis Perry	Jr
DB	2	Malik Rucker	Fr
DB	29	Brandon Snyder	Fr
DB	19	Miles Taylor	Fr
DB	5	Omar Truitt	Fr
DB	26	Kevin Ward	Fr
DB	32	Solomon Warfield	Fr

Special teams

Pos.	#	Name	Class
K	2	Mick Ellis	Fr
K	1	Marshall Koehn	Jr
K	91	Miguel Recinos	Fr
P	16	Dilon Kidd	Jr
P	98	Connor Kornbrath	Jr
LS	55	Zach Johnson	Jr
LS	97	Tyler Kluver	Fr

Head coach

- Kirk Ferentz

Coordinators/assistant coaches

- Greg Davis – offensive coordinator and quarterbacks
- Phil Parker – defensive coordinator
- Brian Ferentz – offensive line
- Bobby Kennedy – wide receivers
- Reese Morgan – defensive line
- Jim Reid – defensive assistant
- Seth Wallace – recruiting coordinator/defensive assistant coach
- Chris White – running backs and special teams
- LeVar Woods – linebackers
- Chris Doyle – strength and conditioning
- Kevin Anderson – strength and conditioning assistant
- Kelvin Bell – director of on-campus recruiting
- DJ Hernandez – offensive graduate assistant
- Justin Lima – strength and conditioning assistant
- Chris Polizzi – defensive graduate assistant
- Austin Showalter – offensive graduate assistant
- Joel Welsh, Jr. – strength and conditioning assistant coach
- Doug West – senior athletic trainer
- Max Allen – director of new media
- Ned Amendola, M.D. – director of UI Sports Medicine Center
- Chic Ejiasi – director of player development
- Paul Federici – director of football operations
- Russ Haynes – associate director of athletic training services
- Bob Rahfeldt – assistant video coordinator
- Chris Ruth – assistant video coordinator
- Scott Southmayd – quality control director

Legend

- (C) Team captain
- (S) Suspended
- (I) Ineligible
- Injured
- Redshirt

Roster
Last update: 9/3/14

== Game summaries ==
=== Northern Iowa ===
Northern Iowa vs. Iowa

Team	1	2	3	4	Total
Panthers	3	10	7	3	23
• Hawkeyes	7	10	7	7	31

- Date: August 30
- Location: Kinnick Stadium
  Iowa City, IA
- Game start: 11:01 a.m. CDT
- Elapsed time: 3:01
- Game attendance: 66,805
- Game weather: 73 °F (23 °C), Partly Cloudy, Wind W 10 mph (16 km/h)
- Referee: Dave McGinn
- TV announcers (BTN): Eric Collins, Chuck Long
- Source: Box Score

Scoring summary
1	13:44	Iowa	LeShun Daniels Jr. 13-yard run (Marshall Koehn kick)	Iowa 7–0
1	11:38	Northern Iowa	Michael Schmadeke 36-yard field goal	Iowa 7–3
2	12:16	Northern Iowa	Kevin Vereen Jr. 23-yard pass from Sawyer Kollmorgen (Michael Schmadeke kick)	Northern Iowa 10–7
2	5:03	Iowa	Mark Weisman 1-yd run (Marshall Koehn kick)	Iowa 14–10
2	2:17	Northern Iowa	Michael Schmadeke 37-yard field goal	Iowa 14–13
2	0:01	Iowa	Marshall Koehn 40-yard field goal	Iowa 17–13
3	10:13	Iowa	Tevaun Smith 6-yard pass from Jake Rudock (Marshall Koehn kick)	Iowa 24–13
3	9:31	Northern Iowa	David Johnson 70-yard pass from Sawyer Kollmorgen (Michael Schmadeke kick)	Iowa 24–20
4	12:42	Northern Iowa	Michael Schmadeke 38-yard field goal	Iowa 24–23
4	6:50	Iowa	Damond Powell 12-yard pass from Jake Rudock (Marshall Koehn kick)	Iowa 31–23

Future NFL star David Johnson had almost 250 yards of total offense for Northern Iowa but it still wasn't enough to upset host Iowa. The Panthers never went away and kept the game close until the final minutes, but a Hawkeye touchdown in the fourth quarter put the game out of reach.

=== Ball State ===
Ball State vs. Iowa

Team	1	2	3	4	Total
Cardinals	0	7	6	0	13
• Hawkeyes	0	3	0	14	17

- Date: September 6
- Location: Kinnick Stadium
  Iowa City, IA
- Game start: 2:35 p.m. CDT
- Elapsed time: 3:18
- Game attendance: 64,210
- Game weather: 71 °F (22 °C), Sunny, Wind N 7 mph (11 km/h)
- Referee: Jeff Maconaghy
- TV announcers (ESPN2): Beth Mowins, Joey Galloway, Paul Carcaterra
- Source: Box Score

Scoring summary
2	13:08	Ball State	Blake Dueitt 35-yard fumble return (Scott Secor kick)	Ball State 7–0
2	11:23	Iowa	Marshall Koehn 26-yard field goal	Ball State 7–3
3	10:37	Ball State	Scott Secor 42-yard field goal	Ball State 10–3
3	8:43	Ball State	Scott Secor 27-yard field goal	Ball State 13–3
4	2:52	Iowa	Derrick Willies 12-yard pass from Jake Rudock (Mick Ellis kick)	Ball State 13–10
4	1:00	Iowa	Jake Duzey 12-yard pass from Jake Rudock (Mick Ellis kick)	Iowa 17–13

Iowa escaped with a win in a game they were widely outplayed in.

=== Iowa State ===
Iowa State vs. Iowa
Iowa Corn Cy-Hawk Series

Team	1	2	3	4	Total
• Cyclones	0	3	7	10	20
Hawkeyes	7	7	0	3	17

- Date: September 13
- Location: Kinnick Stadium
  Iowa City, IA
- Game start: 2:40 p.m. CDT
- Elapsed time: 3:12
- Game attendance: 70,585
- Game weather: 60 °F (16 °C), Sunny, Wind NW 2 mph (3.2 km/h)
- Referee: Alan Eck
- TV announcers (ESPN): Sean McDonough, Chris Spielman, Todd McShay
- Source: Box Score

Scoring summary
1	2:53	Iowa	Mark Weisman 1-yard run (Mick Ellis kick)	Iowa 7–0
2	13:44	Iowa State	Cole Netten 47-yard field goal	Iowa 7–3
2	3:52	Iowa	Jake Rudock 5-yard run (Mick Ellis kick)	Iowa 14–3
3	6:50	Iowa State	E. J. Bibbs 1-yard pass from Sam B. Richardson (Cole Netten kick)	Iowa 14–10
4	7:33	Iowa State	DeVondrick Nealy 27-yard pass from Sam B. Richardson (Cole Netten kick)	Iowa State 17–14
4	4:08	Iowa	Marshall Koehn 44-yard Field Goal	Tied 17–17
4	0:02	Iowa State	Cole Netten 42-yard field goal	Iowa State 20–17

=== At Pittsburgh ===
Iowa vs. Pittsburgh

Team	1	2	3	4	Total
• Hawkeyes	7	0	10	7	24
Panthers	7	10	3	0	20

- Date: September 20
- Location: Heinz Field
  Pittsburgh, PA
- Game start: 12:02 p.m. EDT
- Elapsed time: 3:08
- Game attendance: 48,895
- Game weather: 72 °F (22 °C), Mostly Sunny, Wind SSW 5 mph (8.0 km/h)
- Referee: Dan Capron
- TV announcers (ESPNU): Adam Amin, John Congemi
- Source: Box Score

Scoring summary
1	4:15	Pitt	Chris James 14-yard run (Chris Blewitt kick)	Pitt 7–0
1	0:58	Iowa	Henry Krieger Coble 13-yard pass from Jake Rudock (Mick Ellis kick)	Tied 7–7
2	6:16	Pitt	James Conner 1-yard run (Chris Blewitt kick)	Pitt 14–7
2	0:02	Pitt	Chris Blewitt 33-yard field goal	Pitt 17–7
3	8:17	Iowa	Mark Weisman 10-yard run (Mick Ellis kick)	Pitt 17–14
3	4:54	Pitt	Chris Blewitt 29-yard field goal	Pitt 20–14
3	0:48	Iowa	Marshall Koehn 52-yard field goal	Pitt 20–17
4	6:56	Iowa	Mark Weisman 1-yard run (Mick Ellis kick)	Iowa 24–20

Iowa improved to 3-1 on the season with this road win.

=== At Purdue ===
Iowa vs. Purdue

Team	1	2	3	4	Total
• Hawkeyes	0	10	7	7	24
Boilermakers	7	3	0	0	10

- Date: September 27
- Location: Ross–Ade Stadium
  West Lafayette, IN
- Game start: 12:01 p.m. EDT
- Elapsed time: 3:19
- Game attendance: 36,603
- Game weather: 75 °F (24 °C), Partly Sunny, Wind NNE 5 mph (8.0 km/h)
- Referee: John O'Neill
- TV announcers (BTN): Scott Graham, Stanley Johnson, Evan Fitzgerald
- Source: Box Score

Scoring summary
1	4:13	Purdue	Frankie Williams 39-yard interception return (Paul Griggs kick)	Purdue 7–0
2	11:48	Purdue	Paul Griggs 42-yard field goal	Purdue 10–0
2	8:15	Iowa	Mark Weisman 2-yard run (Marshall Koehn kick)	Purdue 10–7
2	0:13	Iowa	Marshall Koehn 28-yard field goal	Tied 10–10
3	0:45	Iowa	Kevonte Martin-Manley 23-yard pass from C.J. Beathard (Marshall Koehn kick)	Iowa 17–10
4	5:10	Iowa	Mark Weisman 5-yard run (Marshall Koehn kick)	Iowa 24–10

CJ Beathard got his first career start in this victory.

=== Indiana ===
Indiana vs. Iowa
Homecoming

Team	1	2	3	4	Total
Hoosiers	7	14	0	8	29
• Hawkeyes	28	10	0	7	45

- Date: October 11
- Location: Kinnick Stadium
  Iowa City, IA
- Game start: 11:00 a.m. CDT
- Elapsed time: 3:30
- Game attendance: 68,590
- Game weather: 55 °F (13 °C), Sunny, Wind E 4 mph (6.4 km/h)
- Referee: Jerry McGinn
- TV announcers (ESPNU): Adam Amin, John Congemi
- Source: Box Score

Scoring summary
1	4:41	Iowa	Jake Duzey 12-yard pass from Jake Rudock (Marshall Koehn kick)	Iowa 7–0
1	3:37	Iowa	Desmond King 35-yard interception return (Marshall Koehn kick)	Iowa 14–0
1	1:55	Iowa	Damond Powell 72-yard pass from Jake Rudock (Marshall Koehn kick)	Iowa 21–0
1	1:12	Indiana	Tevin Coleman 83-yard run (Griffin Oakes kick)	Iowa 21–7
1	1:03	Iowa	Jonathan Parker 60-yard run (Marshall Koehn kick)	Iowa 28–7
2	13:04	Indiana	Nick Stoner 13-yard pass from Nate Sudfeld (Griffin Oakes kick)	Iowa 28–14
2	10:33	Indiana	Tevin Coleman 45-yard run (Griffin Oakes kick)	Iowa 28–21
2	4:57	Iowa	Marshall Koehn 22-yard field goal	Iowa 31–21
2	0:00	Iowa	Mark Weisman 1-yard run (Marshall Koehn kick)	Iowa 38–21
4	13:17	Iowa	Mark Weisman 1-yard run (Marshall Koehn kick)	Iowa 45–21
4	2:16	Indiana	Tevin Coleman 69-yard run (Shane Wynn run for 2-Point conversion)	Iowa 45–29

Iowa got a homecoming victory in a game that was dominated by offenses.

=== At Maryland ===
Iowa vs. Maryland

Team	1	2	3	4	Total
Hawkeyes	14	0	7	10	31
• Terrapins	7	10	7	14	38

- Date: October 18
- Location: Byrd Stadium
  College Park, MD
- Game start: 12:00 p.m. EDT
- Elapsed time: 3:50
- Game attendance: 48,373
- Game weather: 70 °F (21 °C), Fair, Wind NW 17 mph (27 km/h)
- Referee: David Witvoet
- TV announcers (ESPN2): Beth Mowins, Joey Galloway, Paul Carcaterra
- Source: Box Score

Scoring summary
1	12:45	Iowa	Mark Weisman 4-yard run (Marshall Koehn kick)	Iowa 7–0
1	6:29	Iowa	Henry Krieger-Coble 2-yard pass from Jake Rudock (Marshall Koehn kick)	Iowa 14–0
1	3:40	Maryland	Jacquille Veii 23-yard run (Brad Craddock kick)	Iowa 14–7
2	10:46	Maryland	Brad Craddock 41-yard field goal	Iowa 14–10
2	6:47	Maryland	Wes Brown 1-yard run (Brad Craddock kick)	Maryland 17–10
3	4:18	Maryland	Stefon Diggs 53-yard pass from Perry Hills (Brad Craddock kick)	Maryland 24–14
3	1:46	Iowa	Mark Weisman 2-yard run (Marshall Koehn kick)	Maryland 24–21
4	12:29	Maryland	William Likely 45-yard interception return (Brad Craddock kick)	Maryland 31–21
4	4:58	Maryland	Wes Brown 1-yard run (Brad Craddock kick)	Maryland 38–21
4	2:58	Iowa	Jacob Hillyer 4-yard pass from Jake Rudock (Marshall Koehn kick)	Maryland 38–28
4	1:19	Iowa	Marshall Koehn 24-yard field goal	Maryland 38–31

=== Northwestern ===
Northwestern vs. Iowa

Team	1	2	3	4	Total
Wildcats	0	7	0	0	7
• Hawkeyes	24	14	0	10	48

- Date: November 1
- Location: Kinnick Stadium
  Iowa City, IA
- Game start: 11:00 a.m. CDT
- Elapsed time: 3:00
- Game attendance: 66,887
- Game weather: 40 °F (4 °C), Sunny, Wind E 5 mph (8.0 km/h)
- Referee: Todd Geerlings
- TV announcers (BTN): Eric Collins, Chuck Long, J Leman
- Source: Box Score

Scoring summary
1	13:15	Iowa	Mark Weisman 8-yard run (Marshall Koehn kick)	Iowa 7–0
1	9:43	Iowa	Marshall Koehn 48-yard field goal	Iowa 10–0
1	5:28	Iowa	Mark Weisman 14-yard run (Marshall Koehn kick)	Iowa 17–0
1	3:29	Iowa	Ben Niemann 1-yard blocked punt return (Marshall Koehn kick)	Iowa 24–0
2	14:21	Northwestern	Justin Jackson 1-yard Run (Jack Mitchell kick)	Iowa 24–7
2	8:11	Iowa	Tevaun Smith 31-yard pass from Jake Rudock (Marshall Koehn kick)	Iowa 31–7
2	0:54	Iowa	Mark Weisman 8-yard run (Marshall Koehn kick)	Iowa 38–7
4	13:47	Iowa	Marshall Koehn 24-yard field goal	Iowa 41–7
4	3:17	Iowa	Akrum Wadley 5-yard run (Marshall Koehn Kick)	Iowa 48–7

Mark Weisman ran for 94 yards and three touchdowns and freshman Akrum Wadley ran for 106 yards and a touchdown in this blowout victory for Iowa. The Hawkeyes dominated on both sides of the ball as Northwestern's lone touchdown was assisted by a muffed punt.

=== At Minnesota ===
Iowa vs. Minnesota
Floyd of Rosedale

Team	1	2	3	4	Total
Hawkeyes	7	0	0	7	14
• Golden Gophers	7	28	7	9	51

- Date: November 8
- Location: TCF Bank Stadium
  Minneapolis, MN
- Game start: 11:00 a.m. CST
- Elapsed time: 3:19
- Game attendance: 49,680
- Game weather: 38 °F (3 °C), Overcast & Blustery, Wind NNE 12 mph (19 km/h)
- Referee: Shawn Smith
- TV announcers (ESPN2): Beth Mowins, Joey Galloway, Paul Carcaterra
- Source: Box Score

Scoring summary
1	9:13	Iowa	Mark Weisman 1-yard run (Marshall Koehn kick)	Iowa 7–0
1	5:38	Minnesota	K. J. Maye 9-yard run (Ryan Santoso kick)	Tied 7–7
2	12:59	Minnesota	Donovahn Jones 44-yard pass from Mitch Leidner (Ryan Santoso kick)	Minnesota 14–7
2	6:49	Minnesota	Maxx Williams 9-yard pass from Mitch Leidner (Ryan Santoso kick)	Minnesota 21–7
2	3:51	Minnesota	David Cobb 6-yard run (Ryan Santoso kick)	Minnesota 28–7
2	0:31	Minnesota	Maxx Williams 4-yard pass from Mitch Leidner (Ryan Santoso kick)	Minnesota 35–7
3	9:13	Minnesota	Maxx Williams 3-yard pass from Mitch Leidner (Ryan Santoso kick)	Minnesota 42–7
4	11:34	Minnesota	Rodrick Williams Jr. 1-yard run (Andrew Harte kick failed)	Minnesota 48–7
4	6:28	Minnesota	Ryan Santoso 35-yard field goal	Minnesota 51–7
4	0:14	Iowa	Andrew Stone 24-yard pass from C.J. Beathard (Marshall Koehn kick)	Minnesota 51–14

=== At Illinois ===
Iowa vs. Illinois

Team	1	2	3	4	Total
• Hawkeyes	2	7	7	14	30
Fighting Illini	7	0	0	7	14

- Date: November 15
- Location: Memorial Stadium
  Champaign, IL
- Game start: 11:00 a.m. CST
- Elapsed time: 3:05
- Game attendance: 50,373
- Game weather: 30 °F (−1 °C), Partly Cloudy, Wind SSW 10 mph (16 km/h)
- Referee: Jerry McGinn
- TV announcers (BTN): Cory Provous, J Leman, Rebecca Haarlow
- Source: Box Score

Scoring summary
1	4:55	Iowa	Intentional Grounding penalty resulted in a safety	Iowa 2–0
1	2:29	Illinois	Mike Dudek 31-yard pass from Wes Lunt (David Reisner kick)	Illinois 7–2
2	10:56	Iowa	Ray Hamilton 1-yard pass from Jake Rudock (Marshall Koehn kick)	Iowa 9–7
3	2:56	Iowa	Ray Hamilton 6-yard pass from Jake Rudock (Marshall Koehn kick)	Iowa 16–7
4	13:41	Iowa	Jake Rudock 6-yard run (Marshall Koehn kick)	Iowa 23–7
4	8:05	Iowa	Damond Powell 19-yard pass from C.J. Beathard (Marshall Koehn kick)	Iowa 30–7
4	3:52	Illinois	Mike Dudek 31-yard pass from Reilly O'Toole (David Reisner kick)	Iowa 30–14

Iowa had little trouble with Illinois in the first contest between the schools since 2008.

=== No. 14 Wisconsin ===
No. 14 Wisconsin vs. Iowa
Heartland Trophy

Team	1	2	3	4	Total
• No. 14 Badgers	3	13	3	7	26
Hawkeyes	3	0	8	13	24

- Date: November 22
- Location: Kinnick Stadium
  Iowa City, IA
- Game start: 2:36 p.m. CST
- Elapsed time: 3:15
- Game attendance: 68,610
- Game weather: 53 °F (12 °C), Cloudy, Wind SW 9 mph (14 km/h)
- Referee: Dan Capron
- TV announcers (ABC/ESPN2): Dave Flemming, Chris Spielman, Todd McShay
- Source: Box Score

Scoring summary
1	11:52	Wisconsin	Rafael Gaglianone 50-yard field goal	Wisconsin 3–0
1	4:01	Iowa	Marshall Koehn 26-yard field goal	Tied 3–3
2	11:02	Wisconsin	Tanner McEvoy 45-yard run (Rafael Gaglianone PAT failed)	Wisconsin 9–3
2	1:05	Wisconsin	Melvin Gordon 6-yard run (Rafael Gaglianone kick)	Wisconsin 16–3
3	5:33	Wisconsin	Rafael Gaglianone 22-yard field goal	Wisconsin 19–3
3	2:45	Iowa	Kevonte Martin-Manley 20-yard pass from Jake Rudock (Jordan Canzeri run for Two-Point Conversion)	Wisconsin 19–11
4	11:10	Iowa	Jake Rudock 3-yard run (Two-Point pass Conversion failed)	Wisconsin 19–17
4	7:44	Wisconsin	Melvin Gordon 23-yard run (Rafael Gaglianone kick)	Wisconsin 26–17
4	5:01	Iowa	Jake Duzey 9-yard pass from Jake Rudock (Marshall Koehn kick)	Wisconsin 26–24

=== Nebraska ===
Nebraska vs. Iowa
Hy-Vee Heroes Game

Team	1	2	3	4	OT	Total
• Cornhuskers	0	7	7	17	6	37
Hawkeyes	0	10	14	7	3	34

- Date: November 28
- Location: Kinnick Stadium
  Iowa City, IA
- Game start: 11:00 a.m. CST
- Elapsed time: 3:44
- Game attendance: 66,897
- Game weather: 28 °F (−2 °C), Mostly Cloudy, Wind S 5–15 mph (8.0–24.1 km/h)
- Referee: Mike Cannon
- TV announcers (ABC): Bob Wischusen, Matt Millen, Quint Kessenich
- Source: Box Score

Scoring summary
2	9:07	Iowa	John Lowdermilk 17-yard interception return (Marshall Koehn kick)	Iowa 7–0
2	1:44	Iowa	Marshall Koehn 22-yard field goal	Iowa 10–0
2	0:20	Nebraska	Ameer Abdullah 5-yard pass from Tommy Armstrong Jr. (Drew Brown kick)	Iowa 10–7
3	11:21	Iowa	Tevaun Smith 37-yard pass from Jake Rudock (Marshall Koehn kick)	Iowa 17–7
3	8:45	Iowa	Drew Ott 12-yard punt block return (Marshall Koehn kick)	Iowa 24–7
3	1:44	Nebraska	Taariq Allen 34-yard pass from Tommy Armstrong Jr. (Drew Brown kick)	Iowa 24–14
4	13:24	Nebraska	Kenny Bell 32-yard pass from Tommy Armstrong Jr. (Drew Brown kick)	Iowa 24–21
4	12:06	Nebraska	De'Mornay Pierson-El 80-yard punt return (Drew Brown kick)	Nebraska 28–24
4	1:49	Iowa	Jordan Canzeri 5-yard pass from Jake Rudock (Marshall Koehn kick)	Iowa 31–28
4	0:08	Nebraska	Drew Brown 20-yard field goal	Tied 31–31
OT	0:00	Iowa	Marshall Koehn 25-yard field goal	Iowa 34–31
OT	0:00	Nebraska	Kenny Bell 9-yard pass from Tommy Armstrong	Nebraska 37–34

=== Vs. Tennessee (TaxSlayer Bowl) ===
Iowa vs. Tennessee
TaxSlayer Bowl

Team	1	2	3	4	Total
Hawkeyes	0	7	0	21	28
• Volunteers	21	14	7	3	45

- Date: January 2
- Location: EverBank Field
  Jacksonville, FL
- Game start: 2:35 p.m. CST
- Elapsed time: 2:25
- Game attendance: 56,310
- Game weather: 63 °F (17 °C), Cloudy, Wind N 6 mph (9.7 km/h)
- Referee: Mike Mothershed
- TV announcers (ESPN): Mark Jones, Rod Gilmore, Jessica Mendoza/Adam Amin, John Congemi, Dawn Davenport
- Source: Box Score

Scoring summary
1	9:27	Tenn	Jalen Hurd 3-yard run (A. Medley kick)	Tenn 7–0
1	2:54	Tenn	Jalen Hurd 29-yard run (A. Medley kick)	Tenn 14–0
1	1:31	Tenn	V. Wharton 49-yard pass from M. Lane (A. Medley kick)	Tenn 21–0
2	12:02	Tenn	Joshua Dobbs 8-yard run (A. Medley kick)	Tenn 28–0
2	3:43	Iowa	M. Weisman 3-yard run (M. Koehn kick)	Tenn 28–7
2	0:21	Tenn	V. Pearson 19-yard pass from J. Dobbs (A. Medley kick)	Tenn 35–7
3	7:46	Tenn	J. Dobbs 11-yard run (A. Medley kick)	Tenn 42–7
4	14:29	Iowa	M. Weisman 1-yard run (M. Koehn kick)	Tenn 42–14
4	8:31	Tenn	A. Medley 28-yard field goal	Tenn 45–14
4	3:30	Iowa	R. Hamilton 31-yard pass from C.J. Beathard (M. Koehn kick)	Tenn 45–21
4	0:20	Iowa	M. VandeBerg 18-yard pass from C.J. Beathard (M. Koehn kick)	Tenn 45–28

The Volunteers scored touchdowns on their first four possessions to take a commanding 28–0 lead early in the 2nd quarter en route to a 35–7 halftime advantage. The Hawkeyes, alternating quarterbacks each of their first six possessions, struggled to find a rhythm on offense until late in the game. Tennessee now leads the series between the two teams, 2–1.

== Postseason Awards ==
- Brandon Scherff – Big Ten Offensive Lineman of the Year, Winner of the Outland Trophy, presented to the nation's best interior lineman, and Unanimous First-team All-American.

== Players in the 2015 NFL draft ==
Player	Position	Round	Pick	NFL club	Ref
Brandon Scherff	Offensive Tackle	1	5	Washington Redskins	
Carl Davis	Defensive End	3	90	Baltimore Ravens	
Andrew Donnal	Offensive Tackle	4	119	St. Louis Rams	
