= 2011 Iowa Hawkeyes football team =

American college football season

2011 Iowa Hawkeyes football

Insight Bowl, L 14–31 vs. Oklahoma
- Conference: Big Ten Conference
- Legends Division
- Record: 7–6 (4–4 Big Ten)
- Head coach: Kirk Ferentz (13th season)
- Offensive coordinator: Ken O'Keefe (13th season)
- Offensive scheme: Pro-style
- Defensive coordinator: Norm Parker (13th season)
- Base defense: 4–3
- Home stadium: Kinnick Stadium

2011 Big Ten Conference football standings
	Conf.			Overall
Team	W		L	W		L
Legends Division
No. 11 Michigan State x	7	–	1	11	–	3
No. 12 Michigan %	6	–	2	11	–	2
No. 24 Nebraska	5	–	3	9	–	4
Iowa	4	–	4	7	–	6
Northwestern	3	–	5	6	–	7
Minnesota	2	–	6	3	–	9
Leaders Division
No. 10 Wisconsin xy$	6	–	2	11	–	3
Penn State x	6	–	2	9	–	4
Purdue	4	–	4	7	–	6
Ohio State	3	–	5	6	–	7
Illinois	2	–	6	7	–	6
Indiana	0	–	8	1	–	11
Championship: Wisconsin 42, Michigan State 39
$ – BCS representative as conference champion; % – BCS at-large representative; x – Division champion/co-champions; y – Championship game participant; Rankings from AP Poll

The 2011 Iowa Hawkeyes football team represented the University of Iowa in the 2011 NCAA Division I FBS football season. The Hawkeyes were led by head coach Kirk Ferentz, who was in his 13th season, and played their homes games at Kinnick Stadium in Iowa City, Iowa. They are member of the Legends Division of the Big Ten Conference. They finished the season 7–6 overall and 4–4 in Big Ten Conference play to finish in fourth place in the Legends Division. They were invited to the Insight Bowl, for the second consecutive year, where they were defeated by Oklahoma, 31–14.

== Schedule ==
Date	Time	Opponent	Site	TV	Result	Attendance
September 3	11:00 am	Tennessee Tech*	Kinnick Stadium; Iowa City, IA	BTN	W 34–7	70,585
September 10	11:00 am	at Iowa State*	Jack Trice Stadium; Ames, IA (Cy-Hawk Trophy)	FSN	L 41–44 ^{3OT}	56,058
September 17	11:00 am	Pittsburgh*	Kinnick Stadium; Iowa City, IA	ESPN2	W 31–27	70,585
September 24	11:00 am	Louisiana–Monroe*	Kinnick Stadium; Iowa City, IA	BTN	W 45–17	70,585
October 8	2:30 pm	at Penn State	Beaver Stadium; University Park, PA	ABC/ESPN	L 3–13	103,497
October 15	6:00 pm	Northwestern	Kinnick Stadium; Iowa City, IA	BTN	W 41–31	70,585
October 22	11:00 am	Indiana^{†}	Kinnick Stadium; Iowa City, IA	BTN	W 45–24	70,585
October 29	2:30 pm	at Minnesota	TCF Bank Stadium; Minneapolis, MN (Floyd of Rosedale)	BTN	L 21–22	46,543
November 5	11:00 am	No. 13 Michigan	Kinnick Stadium; Iowa City, IA	ESPN	W 24–16	70,585
November 12	11:00 am	No. 13 Michigan State	Kinnick Stadium; Iowa City, IA	ESPN2	L 21–37	70,585
November 19	11:00 am	at Purdue	Ross–Ade Stadium; West Lafayette, IN	BTN	W 31–21	44,017
November 25	11:00 am	at No. 22 Nebraska	Memorial Stadium; Lincoln, NE (rivalry)	ABC	L 7–20	85,595
December 30	9:00 pm	vs. No. 19 Oklahoma*	Sun Devil Stadium; Tempe, AZ (Insight Bowl)	ESPN	L 14–31	54,247
*Non-conference game; ^{†}Homecoming; Rankings from AP Poll/Coaches Poll released prior to game; All times are in Central time

== Roster ==
2011 Iowa Hawkeyes football team roster
Players
Coaches
Offense

Pos.	#	Name	Class
QB	15	Jake Rudock	Fr
QB	16	James Vandenberg	Jr
QB	14	John Wienke	Jr
RB	40	Marcus Binns	Fr
RB	32	Damon Bullock	Fr
RB	33	Jordan Canzeri	Fr
RB	34	Marcus Coker	So
RB	33	Adam Cox	Fr
RB	92	Jonathan Gimm	Jr
RB	30	De'Andre Johnson	Fr
RB	25	Mika'll McCall	Fr
RB	35	Matt Mayers	Fr
RB	41	Jacob Reisen	So
RB	38	Brad Rogers	So
RB	28	Mark Weisman	Fr
RB	3	Jason White	Jr
WR	88	Joe Audlehelm	Sr
WR	18	John Chief	Fr
WR	23	Jordan Cotton	So
WR	6	Keenan Davis	Jr
WR	9	Blake Haluska	Fr
WR	84	Jacob Hillyer	Fr
WR	11	Kevonte Martin-Manley	Fr
WR	7	Marvin McNutt	Sr
WR	29	Nick Nielsen	Jr
WR	8	Don Shumpert	So
WR	83	Steven Staggs	Jr
TE	85	Zach Derby	Jr
TE	87	Jake Duzey	Fr
TE	86	C.J. Fiedorowicz	So
TE	82	Ray Hamilton	Fr
TE	39	Brad Herman	Sr
TE	80	Henry Krieger-Coble	Fr
TE	81	Austin Vier	Fr
OL	63	Austin Blythe	Fr
OL	59	Conor Boffeli	So
OL	50	Drew Clark	So
OL	78	Andrew Donnal	Fr
OL	53	James Ferentz	So
OL	57	Tommy Gaul	Fr
OL	73	Adam Gettis	Sr
OL	73	Jared Kracke	Fr
OL	76	Noaln MacMillan	So
OL	66	Casey McMillan	Jr
OL	72	Woody Orne	Sr
OL	77	Riley Reiff	Sr
OL	68	Brandon Scherff	Fr
OL	60	Matt Tobin	Jr
OL	70	Brett Van Sloten	So
OL	65	Jordan Walsh	Fr
OL	56	Markus Zusevics	Sr

Defense

Pos.	#	Name	Class
DL	79	Dominic Alvis	So
DL	54	Steve Bigach	Jr
DL	91	Broderick Binns	Sr
DL	97	Darian Cooper	Fr
DL	58	Lebron Daniel	Sr
DL	93	Mike Daniels	Sr
DL	71	Carl Davis	Fr
DL	96	Joe Forgy	Sr
DL	99	Joe Gaglione	Jr
DL	98	Mike Hardy	Fr
DL	58	Cameron Hayward	Fr
DL	94	Riley McMinn	Fr
DL	87	Thomas Nardo	Sr
DL	90	Louis Trinca-Pasat	Fr
DL	75	Dean Tsopanides	Fr
LB	52	Quinton Alston	Fr
LB	55	Marcus Collins	Fr
LB	17	A.J. DiBona	Fr
LB	13	Tom Donatell	Jr
LB	50	Palmer Foster	Fr
LB	47	Dakota Getz	So
LB	31	Anthony Hitchens	So
LB	20	Christian Kirksey	So
LB	44	James Morris	So
LB	45	Tyler Nielsen	Sr
LB	36	Macon Plewa	Fr
LB	43	Jim Poggi	Fr
LB	51	Terrance Pryor	Jr
LB	49	Melvin Spears	Fr
DB	4	Jordan Bernstine	Sr
DB	7	Brendon Boerm	Fr
DB	22	Torrey Campbell	Fr
DB	2	Greg Castillo	Jr
DB	36	Cole Fisher	Fr
DB	18	Micah Hyde	Jr
DB	22	Brian Kroll	Fr
DB	21	Nico Law	Fr
DB	27	Jordan Lomax	Fr
DB	48	John Lowdermilk	Fr
DB	19	B.J. Lowery	So
DB	5	Tanner Miller	So
DB	16	Jamal Overton	Fr
DB	39	Travis Perry	Fr
DB	28	Shaun Prater	Sr
DB	16	Collin Sleeper	Jr
DB	30	Gavin Smith	Fr
DB	12	Kyle Steinbrecher	Sr
DB	40	Jack Swanson	Jr

Special teams

Pos.	#	Name	Class
K	1	Marshall Koehn	Fr
K	96	Mike Meyer	So
K	8	Trent Mossbrucker	Jr
P	6	Eric Guthrie	Sr
P	15	Jonny Mullings	Fr
LS	65	Ryan Kolka	Fr
LS	61	Casey Kreiter	So

Head coach

- Kirk Ferentz

Coordinators/assistant coaches

- Ken O'Keefe – Offensive coordinator and Quarterbacks
- Norm Parker – Defensive coordinator
- Erik Campbell – Wide receivers
- Lester Erb – Running backs and Special Teams
- Eric Johnson – Recruiting Coordinator and tight ends
- Rick Kaczenski – Defensive line
- Reese Morgan – Offensive line
- Phil Parker – Defensive backs
- Darrell Wilson – Linebackers and Special Teams
- Chris Doyle – Strength and conditioning
- Dustyn Baethke – Strength and Conditioning Assistant
- Charlie Bullen – Defensive Graduate Assistant
- Chad Kraklio – Strength and Conditioning Assistant
- David Raih – Offensive Graduate Assistant
- Doug West – Senior Athletic Trainer
- Ned Amendola, M.D. – Director, UI Sports Medicine Center
- Raimond Braithwaite – Strength and Conditioning Assistant
- Chigozie Ejiasi – Director of player development
- Matthew Engelbert – Video Coordinator
- Paul Federici – Director of football operations
- Russ Haynes – Associate Director, Athletic Training Services
- Bob Rahfeldt – Assistant Video Coordinator
- Scott Southmayd – Quality Control Director
- John Streif – Assistant Athletic Trainer
- LeVar Woods – Administrative Assistant

Legend

- (C) Team captain
- (S) Suspended
- (I) Ineligible
- Injured
- Redshirt

Roster
Last update: December 12, 2011

== Regular season ==
=== Tennessee Tech ===
Tennessee Tech at Iowa

Team	1	2	3	4	Total
Tennessee Tech (0–1)	0	0	0	7	7
• Iowa (1–0)	3	24	7	0	34

- Date: September 3
- Location: Kinnick Stadium
  Iowa City, IA
- Game start: 11:00 a.m. CST
- Elapsed time: 4:27
- Game attendance: 70,585
- Game weather: 75 °F (24 °C), Rain, Wind 6 mph (9.7 km/h) SSW (Game delayed 1 hour and 24 minutes)
- Referee: Bill LeMonnier
- TV announcers (BTN): Tom Werme, Danan Hughes & Stacy Paetz
- Source: Box Score

Scoring summary
1	5:10	Iowa	Mike Meyer 39-yard field goal	Iowa 3–0
2	10:38	Iowa	J. Vandenberg 1-yard run (Meyer kick)	Iowa 10–0
2	7:20	Iowa	M. McNutt 88-yard pass from J. Vandenberg (Meyer kick)	Iowa 17–0
2	3:18	Iowa	Mike Meyer 20-yard field goal	Iowa 20–0
2	0:10	Iowa	Shaun Prater 89-yard interception return (Meyer kick)	Iowa 27–0
3	6:19	Iowa	M. McNutt 19-yard pass from J. Vandenberg (Meyer kick)	Iowa 34–0
4	5:02	TTU	Dontey Gay 1-yard run (Sharp kick)	Iowa 34–7

Honorary Captain: Brad Banks

=== At Iowa State ===
Iowa at Iowa State
Cy-Hawk Trophy

Team	1	2	3	4	OT	2OT	3OT	Total
Iowa (1–1)	7	3	6	8	7	7	3	41
• Iowa State (1–0)	0	10	7	7	7	7	6	44

- Date: September 10
- Location: Jack Trice Stadium
  Ames, IA
- Game start: 11:00 a.m. CST
- Elapsed time: 3:50
- Game attendance: 56,058
- Game weather: 75 °F (24 °C), mostly clear, wind 5–10 mph (8.0–16.1 km/h) N
- Referee: John O'Neill
- TV announcers (FSN): Joel Meyers, Joel Klatt, Jim Knox

=== At Pittsburgh ===
Pittsburgh at Iowa

Team	1	2	3	4	Total
Pittsburgh (2–0)	10	0	14	3	27
• Iowa (2–1)	0	3	7	21	31

- Date: September 17
- Location: Kinnick Stadium
  Iowa City, IA
- Game start: 11:00 a.m. CST
- Elapsed time: 3:17
- Game attendance: 70,585
- Game weather: 58 °F (14 °C), Cloudy, wind 9 mph (14 km/h) ESE
- Referee: Jerry McGinn
- TV announcers (ESPN2): Beth Mowins & Mike Bellotti

=== Louisiana–Monroe ===
Louisiana-Monroe at Iowa

Team	1	2	3	4	Total
Louisiana-Monroe (1–2)	3	0	14	0	17
• Iowa (3–1)	14	14	14	3	45

- Date: September 24
- Location: Kinnick Stadium
  Iowa City, IA
- Game start: 11:00 a.m. CDT
- Elapsed time: 3:00
- Game attendance: 70,585
- Game weather: 56 °F (13 °C), Partly Cloudy, wind 5 mph (8.0 km/h) NE
- Referee: Mike Cannon
- TV announcers (BTN): Kevin Kugler, Danan Hughes & Stacy Paetz
- Source: Box Score

Scoring summary
1	11:39	Iowa	J. Vandenberg 1-yard run (Meyer kick)	Iowa 7–0
1	5:40	ULM	J. Manton 43-yard field goal	Iowa 7–3
1	1:39	Iowa	M. McNutt 13-yard pass from J. Vandenberg (Meyer kick)	Iowa 14–3
2	9:32	Iowa	M. Coker 4-yard run (Meyer kick)	Iowa 21–3
2	2:07	Iowa	M. McNutt 17-yard pass from J. Vandenberg (Meyer kick)	Iowa 28–3
3	9:35	ULM	Browning 4-yard run (Manton kick)	Iowa 28–10
3	6:47	Iowa	M. Coker 2-yard run (Meyer kick)	Iowa 35–10
3	1:56	ULM	Maye 1-yard run (Manton kick)	Iowa 35–17
3	0:39	Iowa	K. Davis 23-yard pass from J. Vandenberg (Meyer kick)	Iowa 42–17
4	8:57	Iowa	Mike Meyer 23-yard field goal	Iowa 45–17

=== At Penn State ===
Iowa at Penn State

Team	1	2	3	4	Total
Iowa (3–2)	0	3	0	0	3
• Penn State (4–1)	3	3	0	7	13

- Date: October 8
- Location: Beaver Stadium
  University Park, PA
- Game start: 3:30 p.m. EDT
- Elapsed time: 2:58
- Game attendance: 103,497
- Game weather: 71 °F (22 °C), Partly Cloudy, wind 3 mph (4.8 km/h) N
- Referee: Dan Capron
- TV announcers (ABC/ESPN): Dave Pasch, Urban Meyer, Chris Spielman & Quint Kessenich
- Source: Box Score Archived October 7, 2018, at the Wayback Machine

Scoring summary
1	1:36	PSU	A. Fera 20-yard field goal	PSU 3–0
2	10:51	Iowa	Mike Meyer 23-yard field goal	Tied 3–3
2	4:59	PSU	A. Fera 20-yard field goal	PSU 6–3
4	8:08	PSU	Haplea 2-yard pass from Matt McGloin (Fera kick)	PSU 13–3

=== Northwestern ===
Northwestern at Iowa

Team	1	2	3	4	Total
Northwestern (2–3)	0	7	10	14	31
• Iowa (4–2)	10	7	0	24	41

- Date: October 15
- Location: Kinnick Stadium
  Iowa City, IA
- Game start: 6:00 p.m. CDT
- Elapsed time: 3:10
- Game attendance: 70,585
- Game weather: 61 °F (16 °C), Mostly Sunny, wind 11 mph (18 km/h) WNW
- Referee: Dennis Lipski
- TV announcers (BTN): Eric Collins, Chris Martin & Dionne Miller
- Source: Box Score

Scoring summary
1	11:17	IOWA	Mike Meyer 27-yard field goal	IOWA 3-0
1	4:08	IOWA	Tanner Miller 98-yard interception return (Mike Meyer kick)	IOWA 10-0
2	9:34	IOWA	Keenan Davis 47-yard pass from James Vandenburg (Mike Meyer kick)	IOWA 17-0
2	3:54	NW	Jeremy Ebert 6-yard pass from Dan Persa (Jeff Budzien kick)	IOWA 17-7
3	9:06	NW	Adonis Smith 4-yard run (Jeff Budzien kick)	IOWA 17-14
3	4:19	NW	Jeff Budzien 47-yard field goal	Tied 17-17
4	13:55	IOWA	Marcus Coker 1-yard run (Mike Meyer kick)	IOWA 24-17
4	8:51	IOWA	Marvin McNutt 35-yard pass from James Vandenburg (Mike Meye kick)	IOWA 31-17
4	6:49	IOWA	Mike Meyer 40-yard field goal	IOWA 34-17
4	4:50	NW	Drake Dunsmore 18-yard pass from Kain Colter (Jeff Budzien kick)	IOWA 34-24
4	3:56	IOWA	Marcus Coker 1-yard run (Mike Meyer kick)	IOWA 41-24
4	2:34	NW	Rashad Lawrence 35-yard pass from Trevor Siemian (Jeff Budzien kick)	IOWA 41-31

=== Indiana ===
Indiana at Iowa
Homecoming

Team	1	2	3	4	Total
Indiana (1–6)	7	7	3	7	24
• Iowa (5–2)	14	21	3	7	45

- Date: October 22
- Location: Kinnick Stadium
  Iowa City, IA
- Game start: 11:01 a.m. CDT
- Elapsed time: 3:09
- Game attendance: 70,585
- Game weather: 51 °F (11 °C), Sunny, wind 6 mph (9.7 km/h) NNW
- Referee: Scott McElwee
- TV announcers (Big Ten Network): Eric Collins, Chris Martin & Dionne Miller
- Source: Box Score

Scoring summary
1	7:50	Iowa	Marcus Coker 1-yard run (Mike Meyer kick)	Iowa 7-0
1	1:34	Indiana	Cody Latimer 3-yard pass from Tre Roberson (Mitch Ewald kick)	Tied 7-7
1	0:38	Iowa	Marvin McNutt 80-yard pass from James Vandenburg (Mike Meyer kick)	Iowa 14-7
2	9:33	Indiana	S. Houston 1-yard run (Mitch Ewald kick)	Tied 14-14
2	8:10	Iowa	Marvin McNutt 24-yard pass from James Vandenburg (Mike Meyer kick)	Iowa 21-14
2	1:38	Iowa	Marcus Coker 2-yard run (Mike Meyer kick)	Iowa 28-14
2	0:16	Iowa	Marvin McNutt 29-yard pass from James Vandenburg (Mike Meyer kick)	Iowa 35-14
3	8:56	Indiana	Mitch Ewald 22-yard field goal	Iowa 35-17
3	4:50	Iowa	Mike Meyer 47-yard field goal	Iowa 38-17
4	3:10	Iowa	Brad Herman 1-yard pass from James Vandenburg (Mike Meyer kick)	Iowa 45-17
4	0:50	Indiana	S. Houston 1-yard run (Mitch Ewald kick)	Iowa 45-24

=== At Minnesota ===
Iowa at Minnesota
Floyd of Rosedale

Team	1	2	3	4	Total
Iowa (5–3)	0	7	7	7	21
• Minnesota (1–6)	0	7	3	12	22

- Date: October 29
- Location: TCF Bank Stadium
  Minneapolis, MN
- Game start: 2:30 p.m. CST
- Elapsed time: 3:00
- Game attendance: 46,543
- Game weather: 51 °F (11 °C), Clear, wind 7 mph (11 km/h) SW
- Referee: Bill LeMonnier
- TV announcers (Big Ten Network): Eric Collins, Chris Martin & Dionne Miller

=== Michigan ===
Michigan at Iowa

Team	1	2	3	4	Total
#13/13 Michigan (7–2)	6	0	3	7	16
• Iowa (6–3)	7	10	0	7	24

- Date: November 5
- Location: Kinnick Stadium
  Iowa City, IA
- Game start: 11:00 a.m. CST
- Elapsed time: 3:11
- Game attendance: 70,585
- Game weather: 44 °F (7 °C), Partly Cloudy, wind 13 mph (21 km/h) SSE
- Referee: Dan Capron
- TV announcers (ESPN): Dave Pasch, Chris Spielman & Quint Kessenich
- Source: Box Score

Scoring summary
1	10:29	Iowa	Marcus Coker 4-yard run (Mike Meyer kick)	Iowa 7-0
1	2:14	Mich	Fitzgerald Toussaint 5-yard pass from Denard Robinson (run failed)	Iowa 7-6
2	6:58	Iowa	Brad Herman 1-yard pass from James Vandenburg (Mike Meyer kick)	Iowa 14-6
2	2:11	Iowa	Mike Meyer 42-yard field goal	Iowa 17-6
3	6:19	Mich	Brendan Gibbons 32-yard field goal	Iowa 17-9
4	10:42	Iowa	Marcus Coker 13-yard run (Mike Meyer kick)	Iowa 24-9
4	7:53	Mich	Kevin Koger 7-yard pass from Denard Robinson (Brendan Gibbons kick)	Iowa 24-16

=== Michigan State ===
Michigan State at Iowa
Senior Day

Team	1	2	3	4	Total
• #13/13 Michigan State (7–2)	14	17	3	3	37
Iowa (6–4)	0	7	14	0	21

- Date: November 12
- Location: Kinnick Stadium
  Iowa City, IA
- Game start: 11:00 a.m. CST
- Elapsed time: 3:35
- Game attendance: 70,585
- Game weather: 51 °F (11 °C), Partly Cloudy, wind 12 mph (19 km/h) S
- Referee: Dave Witvoet
- TV announcers (ESPN2): Beth Mowins & Mike Bellotti

=== At Purdue ===
Iowa at Purdue

Team	1	2	3	4	Total
• Iowa (7–4)	14	7	3	7	31
Purdue (5–5)	7	7	0	7	21

- Date: November 19
- Location: Ross–Ade Stadium
  West Lafayette, IN
- Game start: 11:00 a.m. CST
- Elapsed time: 3:17
- Game attendance: 44,017
- Game weather: 49 °F (9 °C), Overcast, wind 17 mph (27 km/h) SSW
- TV announcers (Big Ten Network): Tom Hart, Derek Rackley and Lisa Byington

=== At Nebraska ===
Iowa at Nebraska
Heroes Game

Team	1	2	3	4	Total
Iowa (7–5)	0	0	0	7	7
• #22/22 Nebraska (8–3)	0	10	3	7	20

- Date: November 25
- Location: Memorial Stadium
  Lincoln, NE
- Game start: 11:00 a.m. CST
- Elapsed time: 3:06
- Game attendance: 85,595
- Game weather: 54 °F (12 °C), Overcast, wind 13 mph (21 km/h) S
- Referee: Todd Geerlings
- TV announcers (ABC): Bob Wischusen, Bob Davie & Jeanine Edwards

=== Vs. Oklahoma (Insight Bowl) ===
Iowa vs. Oklahoma
Insight Bowl

Team	1	2	3	4	Total
Iowa (7–6)	0	0	0	14	14
• #19/19 Oklahoma (9–3)	7	7	7	10	31

- Date: December 30
- Location: Sun Devil Stadium
  Tempe, AZ
- Game start: 8:00 p.m. MST
- Elapsed time: 3:23
- Game attendance: 54,247
- Game weather: 62 °F (17 °C), clear, wind calm
- Referee: Jack Wood
- TV announcers (ESPN): Sean McDonough, Matt Millen & Heather Cox
- Source: Box Score

Scoring summary
1	10:19	Oklahoma	Blake Bell 4-yard run (Hunnicutt kick)	Oklahoma 7–0
2	6:56	Oklahoma	Blake Bell 4-yard run (Hunnicutt kick)	Oklahoma 14–0
3	7:42	Oklahoma	T. Ratterree 3-yard pass from Landry Jones (Hunnicutt kick)	Oklahoma 21–0
4	14:46	Iowa	C.J. Fiedorowicz 5-yard pass from James Vandenberg (Meyer kick)	Oklahoma 21–7
4	6:56	Iowa	Jordan Canzeri 9-yard pass from James Vandenberg (Meyer kick)	Oklahoma 21–14
3	2:28	Oklahoma	Mike Hunnicutt 35-yard field goal	Oklahoma 24–14
4	0:45	Oklahoma	Blake Bell 21-yard run (Hunnicutt kick)	Oklahoma 31–14

== Postseason awards ==
- Marvin McNutt - Big Ten Wide Receiver of the Year
- Riley Reiff - First-team All-American (Pro Football Writers)

== Players in the 2012 NFL draft ==
Player	Position	Round	Pick	NFL Club	Ref
Riley Reiff	Offensive Tackle	1	23	Detroit Lions	
Mike Daniels	Defensive tackle	4	132	Green Bay Packers	
Adam Gettis	Offensive Guard	5	141	Washington Redskins	
Shaun Prater	Cornerback	5	156	Cincinnati Bengals	
Marvin McNutt	Wide receiver	6	194	Philadelphia Eagles	
Jordan Bernstine	Cornerback	7	217	Washington Redskins	
