= 2015 Senior Bowl =

2015 Reese's Senior Bowl
- 66th Senior Bowl
North Team	South Team
34	13
Head coach: Ken Whisenhunt (Tennessee Titans)	Head coach: Gus Bradley (Jacksonville Jaguars)
	1	2	3	4	Total
North	3	7	10	14	34
South	7	0	3	3	13
- Date: January 24, 2015
- Season: 2014
- Stadium: Ladd–Peebles Stadium
- Location: Mobile, Alabama
- MVP: Ameer Abdullah
- Referee: Shawn Smith
- Attendance: 36,471

United States TV coverage
- Network: NFL Network

The 2015 Senior Bowl was an all-star college football exhibition game featuring players from the 2014 NCAA Division I FBS football season as well as prospects for the 2015 draft of the professional National Football League (NFL). The game concluded the post-season that had begun on December 21, 2014. Sponsored by Reese's Peanut Butter Cups, it was officially known as the Reese's Senior Bowl.

Played at Ladd–Peebles Stadium in Mobile, Alabama, the game featured the North and the South as the opposing teams. The NFL Network broadcast the game live on January 24, 2015, at 3:00 p.m. CST. The North won 34–13.

Sports Illustrated named Ali Marpet of Hobart and William Smith Colleges—the first NCAA Division III player selected for the Senior Bowl in its 66 years—the game's "biggest riser".

== Rosters ==
=== North Team ===
No.	Name	Position	HT/WT	School
1	Jeff Luc	ILB	6'0"/263	Cincinnati
2	Steven Nelson	CB	5'11"/199	Oregon State
3	Jamison Crowder	WR	5'8"/174	Duke
4	Adrian Amos	S	6'0"/214	Penn State
4	Sean Mannion	QB	6'5"/229	Oregon State
5	Shane Carden	QB	6'2"/218	East Carolina
6	Marcus Murphy	RB	5'9"/195	Missouri
6	Tom Obarski	K	5'10"/177	Concordia (MN)
7	Ty Montgomery	WR	6'0"/216	Stanford
9	Devin Smith	WR	6'0"/190	Ohio State
10	Hayes Pullard	ILB	6'0"/236	USC
11	Marcus Hardison	DE	6'3"/311	Arizona State
12	Doran Grant	CB	5'10"/199	Ohio State
14	Bryce Petty	QB	6'3"/230	Baylor
14	Curtis Grant	ILB	6'3"/238	Ohio State
16	Josh Shaw	CB	6'0"/198	USC
18	Eric Rowe	CB	6'1"/204	Utah
22	Quinten Rollins	CB	5'11"/193	Miami (OH)
23	Damarious Randall	S	5'11"/194	Arizona State
26	Quandre Diggs	CB	5'9"/196	Texas
27	Kurtis Drummond	S	6'1"/205	Michigan State
28	Ameer Abdullah	RB	5'8"/198	Nebraska
29	Kyle Loomis	P	6'1"/222	Portland State
30	Tyler Varga	FB	5'10"/227	Yale
33	Jeremy Langford	RB	6'0"/211	Michigan State
37	David Cobb	RB	5'11"/229	Minnesota
44	Ibraheim Campbell	S	5'11"/210	Northwestern
50	Ali Marpet	OT	6'4"/307	Hobart
53	Jordan Hicks	OLB	6'1"/241	Texas
58	Deion Barnes	DE	6'4"/260	Penn State

No.	Name	Position	HT/WT	School
60	Chris Jasperse	C	6'3"/297	Marshall
66	Max Garcia	C	6'4"/305	Florida
68	T. J. Clemmings	OT	6'5"/307	Pittsburgh
70	Robert Myers	OG	6'5"/329	Tennessee State
71	Carl Davis	DT	6'5"/321	Iowa
74	Jamil Douglas	OT	6'4"/307	Arizona State
76	Donovan Smith	OT	6'6"/341	Penn State
77	Laken Tomlinson	OG	6'3"/323	Duke
78	Rob Havenstein	OT	6'7"/332	Wisconsin
79	Trent Brown	OT	6'8"/376	Florida
81	Vince Mayle	WR	6'2"/219	Washington State
82	Justin Hardy	WR	5'10"/190	East Carolina
84	Tony Lippett	WR	6'2"/192	Michigan State
85	Antwan Goodley	WR	5'10"/210	Baylor
86	Nick Boyle	TE	6'4"/267	Delaware
87	Casey Pierce	TE	6'3"/244	Kent State
88	Ben Koyack	TE	6'5"/249	Notre Dame
90	Louis Trinca-Pasat	DT	6'1"/291	Iowa
91	Henry Anderson	DE	6'6"/287	Stanford
93	Joe Cardona	LS	6'2"/241	Navy
94	Za'Darius Smith	DE	6'5"/270	Kentucky
95	Danny Shelton	DT	6'2"/343	Washington
96	Zack Hodges	OLB	6'3"/242	Harvard
98	Hau'oli Kikaha	DE	6'2"/246	Washington
99	Nate Orchard	DE	6'3"/251	Utah

=== South Team ===
No.	Name	Position	HT/WT	School
2	Rannell Hall	WR	6'0"/193	Central Florida
3	Josh Harper	WR	6'1"/189	Fresno State
4	Phillip Dorsett	WR	5'9"/183	Miami (FL)
6	Jaquiski Tartt	S	6'1"/220	Samford
6	Blake Sims	QB	5'11"/223	Alabama
7	David Johnson	RB	6'1"/224	Northern Iowa
8	Garrett Grayson	QB	6'2"/215	Colorado State
12	Amarlo Herrera	ILB	6'0"/243	Georgia
13	Bryan Bennett	QB	6'3"/215	SE Louisiana
14	Nick Marshall	CB	6'1"/205	Auburn
15	Dezmin Lewis	WR	6'3"/215	Central Arkansas
16	Donatella Luckett	WR	6'0"/206	Harding
17	Justin Manton	K	6'2"/196	Louisiana–Monroe
18	Sammie Coates	WR	6'2"/213	Auburn
20	Kevin White	CB	5'9"/180	TCU
21	Senquez Golson	CB	5'8"/178	Mississippi
22	Tyler Lockett	WR	5'10"/181	Kansas State
23	Anthony Jefferson	S	6'1"/194	UCLA
25	Cody Prewitt	S	6'2"/212	Mississippi
26	Clayton Geathers	S	6'1"/212	Central Florida
27	Ladarius Gunter	CB	6'1"/200	Miami (FL)
28	Imoan Claiborne	CB	5'10"/189	Northwestern State
33	Markus Golden	DE	6'2"/255	Missouri
34	Andrew East	LS	6'2"/239	Vanderbilt
41	Terrance Plummer	ILB	5'11"/235	Central Florida
42	Stephone Anthony	ILB	6'2"/245	Clemson
43	Connor Neighbors	FB	5'10"/242	LSU

No.	Name	Position	HT/WT	School
44	Cameron Artis-Payne	RB	5'10"/212	Auburn
45	Jalston Fowler	FB	5'11"/264	Alabama
46	Clive Walford	TE	6'4"/254	Miami (FL)
47	Martrell Spaight	OLB	6'0"/232	Arkansas
50	Reese Dismukes	C	6'3"/295	Auburn
52	Denzel Perryman	ILB	5'11"/242	Miami (FL)
54	Tre Jackson	OG	6'4"/323	Florida State
54	Owamagbe Odighizuwa	DE	6'3"/266	UCLA
60	La'el Collins	OT	6'5"/308	LSU
63	Dillon Day	C	6'4"/305	Mississippi State
70	Shaq Mason	OG	6'2"/310	Georgia Tech
75	Blaine Clausell	OT	6'6"/315	Mississippi State
77	Arie Kouandjio	OG	6'5"/318	Alabama
78	Daryl Williams	OT	6'5"/334	Oklahoma
79	Austin Shepheard	OT	6'4"/324	Alabama
84	Devin Mahina	TE	6'6"/256	BYU
85	Geneo Grissom	OLB	6'3"/264	Oklahoma
86	Trey Flowers	DE	6'2"/268	Arkansas
88	C. J. Uzomah	TE	6'5"/263	Auburn
90	Gabe Wright	DT	6'3"/299	Auburn
91	Preston Smith	DE	6'5"/270	Mississippi State
92	Kaleb Eulls	DT	6'3"/305	Mississippi State
94	Lorenzo Mauldin	OLB	6'4"/256	Louisville
95	Grady Jarrett	DT	6'1"/288	Clemson
96	Joey Mbu	DT	6'3"/315	Houston
97	Lynden Trail	OLB	6'6"/262	Norfolk State

== Game summary ==
=== Scoring summary ===
Scoring Play	Score
1st Quarter
SOUTH – David Johnson 19–yard run (Justin Manton kick), 09:05	SOUTH 7 – 0
NORTH – Tom Obarski 49–yard field goal, 05:58	SOUTH 7 – 3
2nd Quarter
NORTH – Ben Koyack 10–yard pass from Sean Mannion (Tom Obarski kick),12:23	NORTH 10 – 7
3rd Quarter
SOUTH – Justin Manton 24–yard field goal, 08:31	TIE 10 – 10
NORTH – Tom Obarski 28–yard field goal, 03:46	NORTH 13 – 10
NORTH – David Cobb 4–yard run (Tom Obarski kick), 00:40	NORTH 20 – 10
4th Quarter
NORTH – Tyler Varga 13–yard run (Tom Obarski kick), 12:08	NORTH 27 – 10
SOUTH – Justin Manton 29–yard field goal, 07:30	NORTH 27 – 13
NORTH – Tyler Varga 7–yard run (Tom Obarski kick), 01:46	NORTH 34 – 13

=== Statistics ===
Statistics	North	South
First downs	25	19
Total offense, plays - yards	65–446	64–368
Rushes-yards (net)	29–186	28–120
Passing yards (net)	260	248
Passes, Comp-Att-Int	22–35–1	17–36–2
Time of Possession	27:48	32:12
