= Carl Davis (defensive tackle) =

American football player (born 1992)

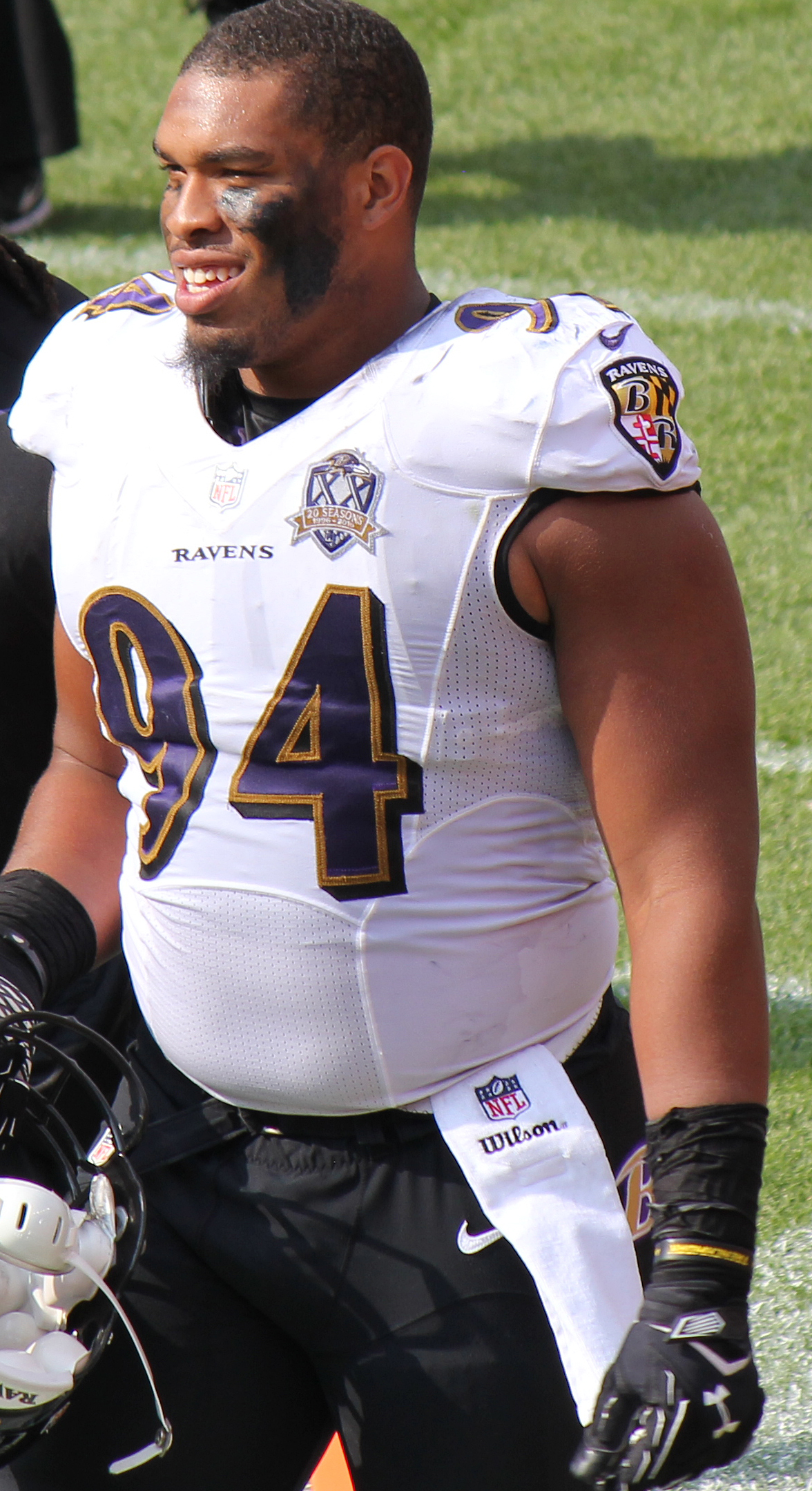
- Davis with the Baltimore Ravens in 2015

Profile
- Position: Defensive tackle

Personal information
- Born: March 2, 1992 (age 34); Detroit, Michigan, U.S.
- Listed height: 6 ft 5 in (1.96 m)
- Listed weight: 332 lb (151 kg)

Career information
- High school: Adlai E. Stevenson (Sterling Heights, Michigan)
- College: Iowa (2010–2014)
- NFL draft: 2015: 3rd round, 90th overall pick

Career history
- Baltimore Ravens (2015–2017); Cleveland Browns (2018); Indianapolis Colts (2019); Jacksonville Jaguars (2019–2020); New England Patriots (2020–2022); Seattle Seahawks (2023)*; Dallas Cowboys (2023); Washington Commanders (2024)
- * Offseason or practice squad member only

Awards and highlights
- 2× second-team All-Big Ten (2013, 2014)

Career NFL statistics as of 2024
- Tackles: 71
- Sacks: 2.5
- Fumble recoveries: 1
- Pass deflections: 3
- Stats at Pro Football Reference

Carl Davis (born March 2, 1992) is an American professional football defensive tackle. He played college football for the Iowa Hawkeyes and was selected by the Baltimore Ravens in the third round of the 2015 NFL draft. Davis has also been a member of several other NFL teams.

== Early life ==
Davis attended Adlai Stevenson High School, where he played high school football. He was named first-team All-state by the Detroit Free Press, The Detroit News and The Macomb Daily. He was a first-team All-conference as a senior after earning second-team honors as a junior. As a junior, he collected 47 tackles, with eight tackles for loss, 15 quarterback hurries and three quarterback sacks, helping his prep team post a 10–2 mark. He recorded 58 tackles as a senior, including six sacks while leading his team to a 13–1 record and advancing to the state championship game at Ford Field. Also blocked two field goals, had one interception and scored one touchdown. Davis also lettered in basketball and track and field.

== College career ==
Davis was redshirted as a true freshman at the University of Iowa in 2010. As a redshirt freshman in 2011, Davis played in six games and had two tackles. As a sophomore in 2012, he played in 11 games making eight tackles. Davis became a first year starter as a junior in 2013, starting all 13 games. He finished the season with 42 tackles and 1.5 sacks. Davis entered his senior season in 2014 as a starter for the second consecutive year.

== Professional career ==
=== Pre-draft ===
On November 10, 2014, it was reported that Davis had accepted an invitation to play in the 2015 Senior Bowl as a part of the North team under Tennessee Titans head coach Ken Whisenhunt. Davis improved his draft stock with top performances during practice throughout the week and met with coaches from the Baltimore Ravens. He was dominant and showed his strength while beating Pitt's offensive tackle T. J. Clemmings. For his efforts, Davis was voted by a panel of NFL scouts as the Reese's Senior Bowl Practice Player of the Week. On January 24, 2015, Davis assisted on a tackle for a loss and sacked Colorado State's Garrett Grayson, as he helped the North defeat the South 34-13. He attended the NFL Combine as a top defensive end prospect and completed nearly all of the required combine drills, but opted to skip the bench press. Davis had pre-draft visits and private workouts with six teams, including the Dallas Cowboys, San Francisco 49ers, Buffalo Bills, Miami Dolphins, Detroit Lions, and Chicago Bears. On March 23, 2015, Davis participated at Iowa's pro day, along with Brandon Scherff, Andrew Donnal, Louis Trinca-Pasat, John Lowdermilk, Damond Powell, Mark Weisman, and six others. At the conclusion of the pre-draft process, Davis was projected to be a second round pick by NFL draft experts and scouts. He was ranked the fifth best defensive tackle prospect by Sports Illustrated, the sixth best defensive tackle by NFLDraftScout.com and NFL analyst Mike Mayock, and was ranked the eighth best defensive tackle by NFL analyst Charles Davis.

Pre-draft measurables
Height	Weight	Arm length	Hand span	Wingspan	40-yard dash	10-yard split	20-yard split	20-yard shuttle	Three-cone drill	Vertical jump	Broad jump	Bench press
6 ft 4 5/8 in (1.95 m)	320 lb (145 kg)	34 5/8 in (0.88 m)	11 in (0.28 m)	7 ft 0 3/4 in (2.15 m)	5.07 s	1.73 s	2.91 s	4.47 s	7.91 s	33.0 in (0.84 m)	8 ft 7 in (2.62 m)	28 reps
All values from NFL Combine/Pro Day

=== Baltimore Ravens ===
==== 2015 ====
The Baltimore Ravens selected Davis in the third round (90th overall) of the 2015 NFL draft, after unexpectedly falling in the draft. He was the fifth defensive tackle selected, behind Danny Shelton (No. 12, Cleveland Browns), Malcom Brown (No. 32, New England Patriots), Eddie Goldman (No. 39, Bears), and Jordan Phillips (No. 52, Dolphins). The Baltimore Ravens were originally targeting Florida State's P. J. Williams (No. 78, Saints), Virginia's Eli Harold (No. 79, 49ers), and UNI's David Johnson (No. 86, Cardinals) with their third round selection, but chose Davis as he was the best talent available. Although the Baltimore Ravens did not have a pre-draft visit or private workout with Davis, they did meet with him during the Senior Bowl and NFL Scouting Combine in Indianapolis. On May 8, 2015, the Baltimore Ravens signed Davis to a four-year, $2.95 million contract that includes a signing bonus of $625,084.

He competed with Brandon Williams and Christo Bilukidi throughout training camp for the vacant starting nose tackle position left by the departure of Haloti Ngata to the Lions during free agency. Head coach John Harbaugh named Davis the backup starting nose tackle to Williams to begin the regular season.

He made his professional regular season debut in the Ravens' season-opener against the Denver Broncos and recorded three combined tackles and a pass deflection in their 19–13 loss. On September 27, 2015, Davis earned his first career start at defensive tackle and defended a pass during their 28–24 loss to the Cincinnati Bengals. He started the next two games at defensive tackle, in place of Timmy Jernigan who had an injured knee. Davis was a healthy scratch for Weeks 12–14 despite having a strong start to his rookie season and being the first member of the Ravens' 2015 draft class to start.

In 13 games of his rookie season, Davis produced 11 tackles and 2 passes defended.

==== 2016 ====
Davis competed with Williams, Willie Henry, Michael Pierce, and Trevon Coley throughout training camp for the starting nose tackle position. On September 1, 2016, Davis sustained an ankle injury and left during the Ravens' 23–14 victory over the New Orleans Saints in their pre-season finale. On September 5, 2016, Davis was placed on injured reserve and missed the entire 2016 season with an ankle injury.

==== 2017 ====
Davis returned to training camp in 2017 and competed with Brent Urban, Williams, and Bronson Kaufusi for the starting defensive end position. He was named the backup defensive end, behind Urban and Williams to start the regular season.

On October 1, 2017, David earned his first start of the season after Urban was placed on injured reserve. He recorded three solo tackles in the Ravens' 26–9 loss to the Pittsburgh Steelers. The next game, he suffered a hamstring injury during the first half of a 30–17 victory over the Oakland Raiders. He missed the following game and played sparingly in the next 7 weeks due to the injury.

==== 2018 ====
On September 1, 2018, Davis was waived by the Ravens.

=== Cleveland Browns ===
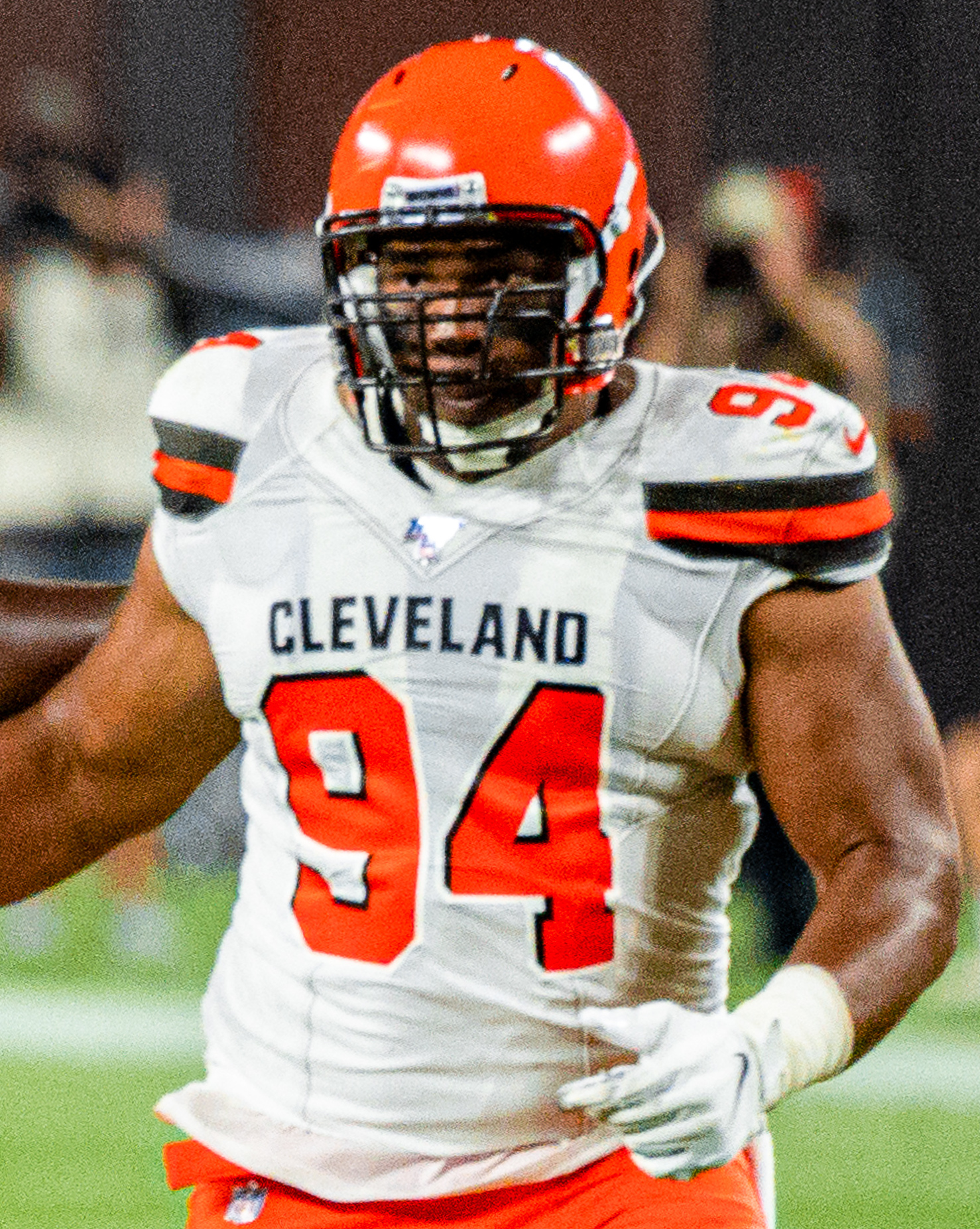
Davis with the Browns in 2019

On September 2, 2018, Davis was claimed off waivers by the Cleveland Browns. He played minimally for the Browns, registering just one assisted tackle for 2018.

The Browns re-signed Davis on a one year $2 million contract on March 12, 2019. The Browns released Davis on August 31, 2019.

=== Indianapolis Colts ===
On October 14, 2019, Davis was signed by the Indianapolis Colts. He was released on November 4.

=== Jacksonville Jaguars ===
On November 25, 2019, Davis was signed by the Jacksonville Jaguars.

On February 4, 2020, Davis was suspended the first four games of the 2020 season for violating the league’s performance-enhancing substance policy. He was re-signed by the Jaguars on April 6, 2020. He was released on May 12, 2020, but re-signed on August 10. He was reinstated from suspension on October 5, 2020, and the team was given a roster exemption for him. He was released on October 12 and signed to the team's practice squad the next day.

=== New England Patriots ===
On October 14, 2020, Davis was signed by the New England Patriots off the Jaguars practice squad. He was placed on injured reserve on November 28, 2020, with a concussion. He was designated to return from injured reserve on December 17, and began practicing with the team again, but was not activated before the end of the regular season.

Davis signed a contract extension with the Patriots on March 15, 2021, and on April 27, 2022, Davis re-signed with the Patriots. He was released on August 27, 2023.

=== Seattle Seahawks ===
On September 20, 2023, Davis was signed to the Seattle Seahawks practice squad. He was waived on October 31.

=== Dallas Cowboys ===
On November 16, 2023, Davis was signed to the Dallas Cowboys practice squad. He was re-signed on March 6, 2024. He was released on August 15.

=== Washington Commanders ===
On October 16, 2024, Davis signed with the Washington Commanders' practice squad; he played in three games and recorded three tackles. He re-signed with the team on May 27, 2025, and was released on August 27, 2025.

== Personal life ==
Davis' mother, Ovella Davis, is a pastor in Detroit. In 2016, Davis founded the Trenchwork Foundation in Detroit.
