= Roseburg shooting =

Roseburg shooting may refer to:

- 2015 Umpqua Community College shooting, a mass shooting in Roseburg, Oregon
- A 2006 shooting incident at Roseburg High School
