= 1906–07 Oregon Agricultural Aggies women's basketball team =

American college basketball season

The undefeated 1906–07 OAC women's basketball team L to R: Pelland (g), M. Scoggin (g), C. Holgate (f), K. Moore (c), F. Roadruck (f)

The 1906–07 Oregon Agricultural Aggies women's basketball team represented Oregon Agricultural College (OAC, today's Oregon State University) during the 1904–05 academic year. It was the ninth academic year in which an organized women's team played games on behalf of OAC.

The team was independent of any organized athletic conference and scheduled its games on an ad hoc basis.

The team finished its season undefeated, racking up a total of 7 wins en route to an Oregon state championship.

== Team history ==
=== October 1906 ===
Daily practices began for prospective players for the Oregon Agricultural College women's basketball team shortly after school resumed for the 1906–07 academic year. Only two players were returning from the 1905–06 team, Kate Moore and Claire Holgate, with former team member Rilla Peters returning to school but electing not to participate. No final team was chosen at this early date.

=== November 1906 ===
Even though coverage of the men's team received priority of placement, this full page sectional divider from the 1908 OAC yearbook still identified basketball as a women's sport.

On November 3, representatives of various Oregon colleges and YMCAs met in Salem to organize a first formal basketball league for the state. This new organization was hampered by the non-participation of three Oregon colleges — the University of Oregon and McMinnville College, which were undecided as to whether they would field university teams in the coming year, and OAC, which was opposed to the new governing organization and boycotted the session. Consequently, it was unclear from the outset whether colleges participating in the league, including Willamette University, Pacific University, and Oregon State Normal School, would be playing the independent Aggies during the 1906–07 season.

The team's first game of the season was initially slated for November 17, 1906, in Monmouth against Oregon State Normal School, but the contest was postponed to Friday, November 23, owing to a scheduling conflict with the football teams of the two schools. When finally played the game was won by the visitors from OAC by a score of 8 to 4, with the victors praising the kind reception accorded them.

=== December 1906 ===
December was a relatively quite month for the OAC women's basketball team, with only a Friday night mid-month game scheduled against Roseburg High School. The contest was won by the Aggies by a score of 19 to 8.

== Roster ==
The following were members of the 1906–07 OAC women's team:

=== Starters ===
- H. Faye Roadruck (forward)
- Claire Holgate (forward)
- Kate Moore (center)
- Mary Rosa "Minnie" Scoggin (guard)
- Hellen Pelland (guard)

=== Support Staff ===
- Skeeter Swann (coach)
- McCallister (business manager)

== Schedule and results ==
Date time, TV	Rank^{#}	Opponent^{#}	Result	Record	Site city, state
1906–07 Season
November 23, 1906		Oregon State Normal School	W 8–4	1-0	Monmouth, Oregon
December 14, 1906		Roseburg High School	W 19–8	2–0	Roseburg, Oregon
January 12, 1907		Willamette University	W 18–7	3–0	OAC Armory; Corvallis, Oregon
January 18, 1907		Chemawa Indian School	W 12–11	4–0	OAC Armory; Corvallis, Oregon
February 2, 1907		Oregon State Normal School	W 11–9	5–0	OAC Armory; Corvallis, Oregon
February 15, 1907		Roseburg High School	W 38–7	6–0	OAC Armory; Corvallis, Oregon
March 12, 1907		Willamette University	W 15–5	7–0	Salem, Oregon
*Non-conference game. ^{#}Rankings from AP Poll. (#) Tournament seedings in parentheses.
