= Quinn Schulte =

American football player (born 2000)

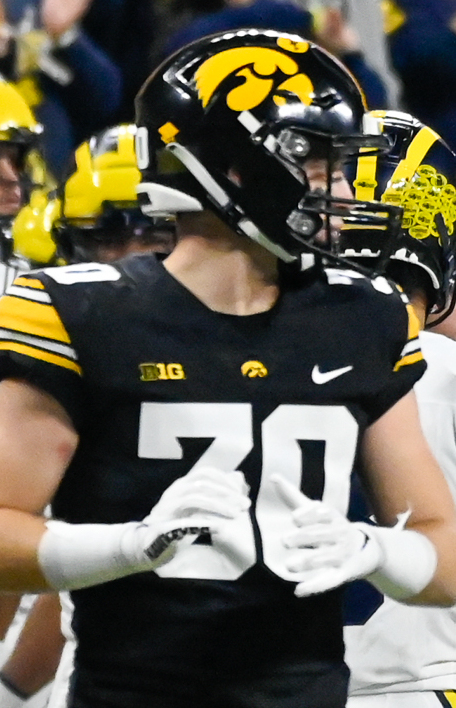
- Schulte playing for the Iowa Hawkeyes in 2023

No. 30
- Position: Safety
- Class: Graduate Student

Personal information
- Born: October 18, 2000 (age 26)
- Listed height: 6 ft 0 in (1.83 m)
- Listed weight: 198 lb (90 kg)

Career information
- High school: Xavier (Cedar Rapids, Iowa)
- College: Iowa (2019–2024)
- Stats at ESPN

Quinn Schulte (born October 18, 2000) is an American former college football safety. He played for the Iowa Hawkeyes.

== Early life ==
Schulte attended Xavier High School in Cedar Rapids, Iowa. Coming out of high school, he joined the Iowa Hawkeyes as a preferred walk-on.

== College career ==
As a freshman in 2019, Schulte took a redshirt and did not play any games. In 2020, he appeared in three games where he made three tackles. In week 5 of the 2021 season, Schulte recorded his first career interception in a blowout win over Maryland. He finished the season playing in 12 games and tallying two tackles and an interception. In the 2022 season, Schulte started all 13 games for Iowa, where he notched 71 tackles, six pass deflections, and an interception. In week 11 of the 2023 season, he intercepted a pass off of quarterback Gavin Wimsatt in a win over Rutgers. During the 2023 season, Schulte started all 14 games for the Hawkeyes, totaling 65 tackles, four pass deflections, and an interception.

== Professional career ==
Pre-draft measurables
Height	Weight	Arm length	Hand span	40-yard dash	10-yard split	20-yard split	20-yard shuttle	Three-cone drill	Vertical jump	Broad jump	Bench press
6 ft 0 1/8 in (1.83 m)	198 lb (90 kg)	30 in (0.76 m)	9 1/4 in (0.23 m)	4.75 s	1.63 s	2.71 s	4.10 s	6.58 s	38.0 in (0.97 m)	9 ft 9 in (2.97 m)	15 reps
All values from Pro Day

Schulte was invited to attend the Las Vegas Raiders NFL Rookie Minicamp in 2025.
