= Xavier High School (Cedar Rapids, Iowa) =

Private secondary school in Cedar Rapids, Iowa, United States

Location
- 6300 42nd Street NE; Cedar Rapids, (Linn County), Iowa 52411; United States; 42°1′27″N 91°43′29″W

Information
- Type: Private, Coeducational
- Motto: Learning with a higher purpose.
- Religious affiliation: Catholicism
- Established: 1998
- Oversight: Archdiocese of Dubuque
- Superintendent: Kim Hermsen
- President: Chris McCarville
- Principal: Lynn Holverson
- Grades: 9th–12th
- Colors: Navy blue and Silver
- Athletics conference: Mississippi Valley Conference
- Mascot: Saints
- Newspaper: The Xpress
- Tuition: $5,720 (Catholic), $10,080 (Non Catholic)
- Feeder schools: St. Joseph School (K-8), LaSalle School (K-8), Regis Middle School (6-8)
- Website: http://www.xaviersaints.org

Xavier High School in Cedar Rapids, Iowa is the only Catholic high school in the local metropolitan area. It is affiliated with twelve area Catholic parishes and the Archdiocese of Dubuque. Xavier opened in 1998 after the merger of two previous Catholic high schools, Regis and LaSalle.

== School information ==
Xavier High School is a member of the National Catholic Education Association and is accredited by the State of Iowa. 58% of the faculty has a M.A. or PhD in their area.

Its campus encompasses a full 60 acres (240,000 m^{2}) in northeastern Cedar Rapids. The 146,500-square-foot (13,610 m^{2}) facility is capable of managing up to 811 students under the current layout. Xavier's football, baseball, softball, and soccer fields are all located on-campus, as well as two full football and soccer practice fields. Newly remodeled tennis courts are on-campus as well. A disk golf course is in place throughout the grounds as well. There is a pond on the eastern edge of campus that students can use for recreation and fishing. Xavier provides an iPad for each student.

== Student information ==
The students at Xavier High School primarily come from the surrounding area's Catholic middle schools: Regis Middle School and LaSalle Middle School (the former high schools that merged to form Xavier) in Cedar Rapids, and Saint Joseph's School in Marion, Iowa.

== Athletics ==
The Saints compete in the Mississippi Valley Conference in the following sports:

- Cross Country
  - Boys: 2 State Championships (2006, 2007)
  - Girls: 2 State Championships (2003, 2007)
- Volleyball
  - 2 State Championships (2020, 2022)
- Football
  - 6 State Championships (2006, 2017, 2018, 2022, 2025, 2026)
  - 3 State Runner Ups (2012, 2013, 2021)
  - 16 District Championships (2006, 2007, 2012, 2013, 2014, 2015, 2016, 2017, 2018, 2020, 2021, 2022, 2023, 2024, 2025, 2026)
  - 23 Playoff Appearances (2001, 2003, 2006, 2007, 2008, 2009, 2010, 2011, 2012, 2013, 2014, 2015, 2016, 2017, 2018, 2019, 2020, 2021, 2022, 2023, 2024, 2025, 2026)
- Basketball
  - Boys: 2 State Championships (2016, 2017)
  - Girls: 6 State Championships (2003, 2005, 2007, 2013, 2022, 2025)
- Wrestling
- Track and Field
  - Boys: 2 State Championships (2007, 2008)
- Golf
- Soccer
  - Boys: 8 State Championships (2004, 2005, 2006, 2010, 2011, 2013, 2015, 2021)
  - Girls: 9 State Championships (2004, 2006, 2007, 2008, 2009, 2010, 2011, 2012, 2013)
- Softball
- Baseball
  - 1 State Championship (2006)
- Tennis
  - Boys: 4 State Championships (2017, 2019, 2021, 2022, 2023)
- Bowling

On June 19, 2007, Sports Illustrated named Xavier as the top athletic high school for the 2006–2007 school year in the state. The Saints girls soccer program has won eight consecutive state titles, and holds the record in Iowa for most consecutive titles won, male or female. The Xavier Athletics Program was recognized by the Des Moines Register as the best in the state of Iowa for medium-sized schools in 2006-07 and again in 2014–15. The Saints football team have won state championships in 2006, 2017, 2018, 2022, 2025 and 2026 going undefeated in the 2006, 2018, 2022, 2025 and 2026 seasons.

== Activities and clubs ==
There are over 1000 co-curricular activities at Xavier. Some of these include intramural basketball, Key Club, National Honor Society, Breakfast Club, SADD, Model UN, BPA (Business Professionals of America), FIRST Tech Challenge, and many others. Many of these clubs include competitive aspects.

=== Xavier Xcentrics ===
Xavier's FIRST Tech Challenge team, the Xavier Xcentrics, advanced to World Competitions in Detroit in the 2018 season.

== Notable alumni ==
- Ryan Sweeney – Chicago Cubs outfielder (Class of 2003)
- Joey Gase – NASCAR stock car driver (Class of 2011)
- Mitch Keller – Pittsburgh Pirates pitcher (Class of 2014)
- Matt Nelson – Minnesota Vikings offensive tackle (Class of 2014)
- Quinn Schulte – Iowa Hawkeyes safety (Class of 2019)
- Ethan Hurkett – NFL defensive end (Class of 2020)

== See also ==
- List of high schools in Iowa
