= Matt Nelson (American football) =

American football player (born 1995)

Profile
- Position: Offensive tackle

Personal information
- Born: December 19, 1995 (age 30); Cedar Rapids, Iowa, U.S.
- Listed height: 6 ft 7 in (2.01 m)
- Listed weight: 315 lb (143 kg)

Career information
- High school: Xavier (Cedar Rapids, Iowa)
- College: Iowa (2014–2018)
- NFL draft: 2019: undrafted

Career history
- Detroit Lions (2019–2023); New York Giants (2024)*; Minnesota Vikings (2025)
- * Offseason or practice squad member only

Career NFL statistics as of 2025
- Games played: 43
- Games started: 14
- Stats at Pro Football Reference

Matt Nelson (born December 19, 1995) is an American professional football offensive tackle. He has previously played for the Detroit Lions, New York Giants, and Minnesota Vikings. He played college football at Iowa.

== Early life ==
Nelson attended high school at Cedar Rapids Xavier. He was a three-year letterman in basketball and two-year letterman in football, playing tight end and defensive end. Nelson held Division I basketball offers, including from Rice, and several Football Bowl Subdivision offers, including from Stanford, Iowa, Notre Dame, Arkansas, and Wisconsin. Xavier reached the state 4-A final back-to-back, with Nelson earning All-State honors. He committed to Iowa in June 2013.

== College career ==
Nelson was a defensive lineman for the Iowa Hawkeyes for five seasons, redshirting as a true freshman. Playing both defensive end and defensive tackle, Nelson finished his collegiate career with 111 tackles, 12 tackles for loss, nine sacks, nine pass break-ups, and one forced fumble. Nelson was a four-time academic all-Big Ten Conference, and earned honorable mention all-Big Ten honors his senior season.

== Professional career ==
Pre-draft measurables
Height	Weight	Arm length	Hand span	40-yard dash	10-yard split	20-yard split	20-yard shuttle	Three-cone drill	Vertical jump	Broad jump	Bench press
6 ft 7 in (2.01 m)	296 lb (134 kg)	34 7/8 in (0.89 m)	9 3/8 in (0.24 m)	5.15 s	1.81 s	2.95 s	4.61 s	7.45 s	30.5 in (0.77 m)	9 ft 3 in (2.82 m)	15 reps
All values from Pro Day

=== Detroit Lions ===
After going undrafted in 2019, Nelson was signed by the Detroit Lions as an undrafted free agent with the intention of moving him to the offensive line. He was waived during final roster cuts, but was re-signed to the Lions practice squad and spent the rest of the season there as he adjusted to the offensive line. Nelson made the team out of training camp in 2020. Nelson made his NFL debut in the season opener on September 13, 2020, against the Chicago Bears.

Nelson was given an exclusive-rights free agent tender by the Lions on March 4, 2021. He signed the one-year contract on April 19.

On March 14, 2023, the Lions re-signed Nelson. He was placed on injured reserve on September 28 with an ankle injury.

=== New York Giants ===
On March 21, 2024, Nelson signed with the New York Giants. He was released on August 27.

=== Minnesota Vikings ===
On July 31, 2025, Nelson signed with the Minnesota Vikings. He was placed on injured reserve on August 11.
