= Kyle Loomis =

Former College football player (born 1987)

Kyle Loomis (born September 30, 1987) is a former College football punter.

== Early life ==
Loomis was born on September 30, 1987, to Tom and Cathy Loomis in Roseburg, Oregon. He attended Roseburg High School where he lettered in football from 2002 to 2005. He was a first team all conference punter for three seasons, and a first team kicker for two. As a junior and senior, he was named first team all state as a punter. In his senior season, he was named team MVP and second team all state as a kicker.

== Oregon State ==
Loomis accepted an offer to Oregon State, where he started at punter as a true freshman. In his freshman season, he averaged 41.3 yards per punt. Despite an outstanding freshman year, Loomis left the team shortly before fall camp for personal reasons.

== Military service ==
Loomis enlisted in the Army in 2007, where he was assigned to the 2-325 Airborne Infantry Regiment - 82nd Airborne Division in Fort Bragg, NC. After nearly a four-year career, Loomis received an honorable discharge from the Army. He returned home to Roseburg, Oregon and obtained a position as an interim engineer with the Oregon Department of Transportation.

== Portland State ==
After seven years away from football, Loomis enrolled at Portland State University in the fall of 2012. He walked onto the football team, and led the nation in punting, with an average of 46.5 yards. While at Portland State, he majored in criminal justice.

== Professional career ==
Loomis participated in the 2015 Seattle Seahawks minicamp on a tryout basis.
