= Roseburg High School =

Public school in Oregon, United States

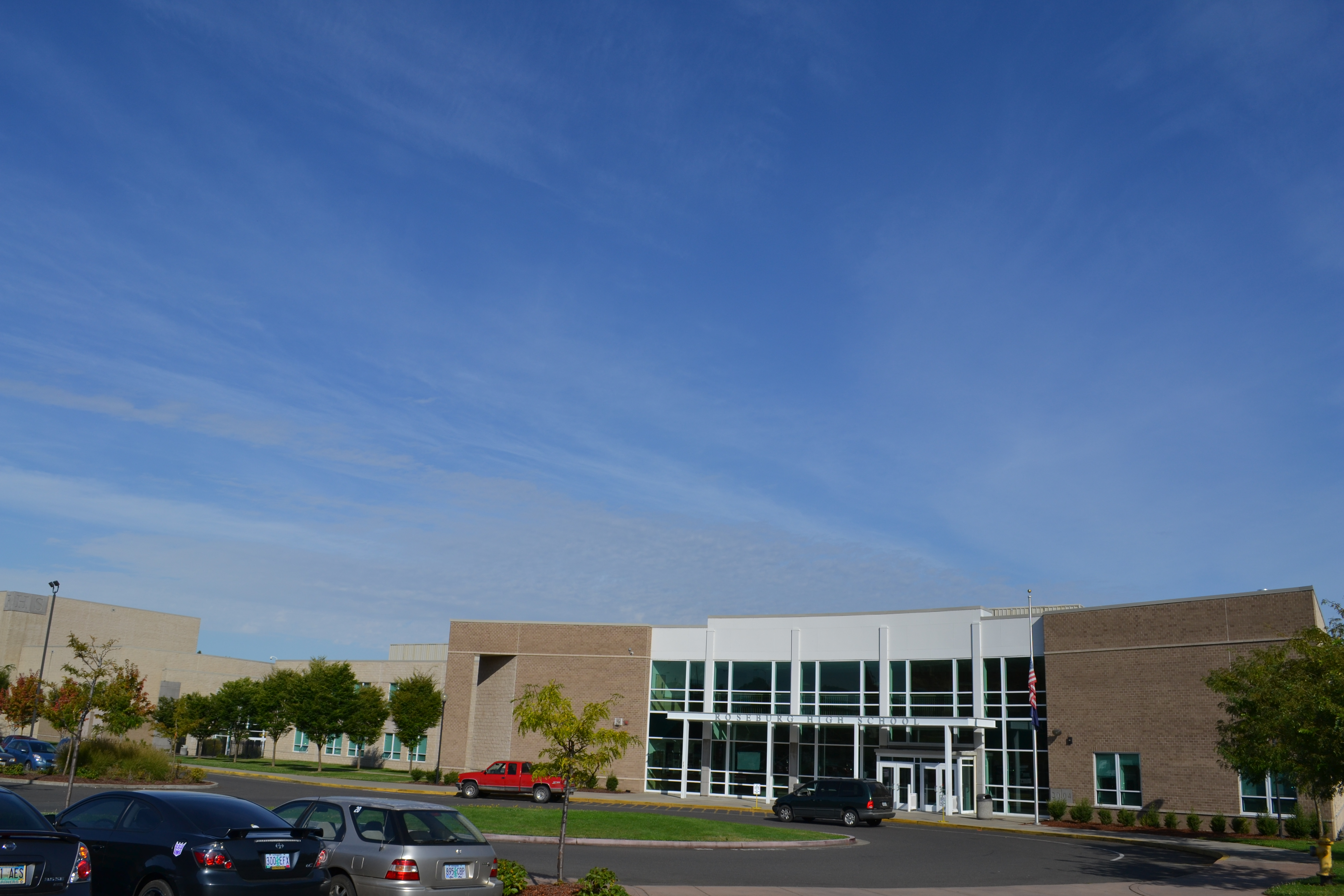

Location
- 400 West Harvard Avenue; Roseburg, (Douglas County), Oregon 97470; United States; 43°12′57″N 123°21′15″W

Information
- Type: Public
- Motto: "Where Excellence is Tradition"
- Established: 1899
- School district: Roseburg School District
- Principal: David Vickery
- Teaching staff: 79.53 (FTE)
- Grades: 9-12
- Enrollment: 1,665 (2023–2024)
- Student to teacher ratio: 20.94
- Colors: Black and Beaver orange
- Athletics conference: OSAA Southwest Conference 6A-6
- Team name: Indians
- Rival: Grants Pass High School
- Newspaper: The Orange R
- Website: School website

Roseburg High School is a public high school in Roseburg, Oregon, United States.

== Campus ==
The campus is roughly 18 acres (73,000 m^{2}) and contains seven main buildings as well as a track and an artificial turf football field.

Completed in 1926, the "Heritage Building," once referred to as the "Main Building", is the oldest on campus. Constructed out of concrete in a cow pasture known as "Bellows Field," the Heritage Building originally consisted of 15 classrooms, a gymnasium and an auditorium.

At three stories high, the tallest building on campus referred to as "The Commons." is completed in 1964. It is located at the center of the campus and houses the Library/Media Center at the ground floor.

In 2001 a major remodel began that included the erection of three new buildings and the demolition of two old buildings. The Fitness Gymnasium located to the south of the Heritage Building was completed in 2002. The Fine Arts Building was completed in the summer of 2003, housing the Rose Theatre, the cafeteria and the fine arts department. The Main Building was completed in 2004 and is the location of the front office, counseling center and career center.

== Athletics ==
The Roseburg Indians participate in Oregon's 6A Southwest Conference, except for the football program, which competes in the 5A Midwestern Conference on a temporary basis.

=== State championships ===
- Football: 1961, 1981, 1990, 1995, 1996
- Wrestling: 1974, 2007, 2008, 2010, 2011, 2012, 2014, 2015, 2016, 2017, 2018, 2019

=== Racism incident ===
In 1987, Roseburg hosted Benson Polytechnic High School in a quarter-final football playoff game. Benson's athletes and spectators were subject to several racial slurs and taunts. The incident resulted in the cancellation of a previously scheduled basketball game against Grant High School, as well as a temporary moratorium on Portland schools visiting Roseburg.

== Academics ==
In 2006, 71% of the school's seniors received a high school diploma. Of 585 students, 427 graduated, 127 dropped out, and 44 were still in high school the following year. In the graduating class of 2021, over 89% of the graduating class completed their diploma or GED, beating the state average in a year that saw most schools decline.

Roseburg High School offers 10 Advanced Placement (AP) classes and opportunities for college credit through Umpqua Community College and Southern Oregon University.

== Mascot controversy ==
The school's "Indians" mascot has been the source of controversy, with some claiming it perpetuates harmful stereotypes and is detrimental to Native American students. In 2021, the school board voted 5-1 to retire the mascot, but failed due to district policy requiring unanimous votes. As per Oregon law, Roseburg High School and the Cow Creek Band of Umpqua Tribe of Indians have had an agreement to use the mascot since 2017.

== Shooting incident ==
At 7:45am on February 23, 2006, 14-year-old freshman Vincent Wayne Leordoro shot and critically wounded 16-year-old Joseph Monti in the school's courtyard. Two students followed the shooter and flagged down a police car as he walked away from school. Police confronted him at a nearby restaurant parking lot, where he put a gun to his head before surrendering. School administrators hired security guards as a result of the incident. Leodoro was sentenced to be held until he was 25 years old.

== Notable alumni ==
- Paul Brothers - football player
- Jamie Burke - MLB baseball player
- Troy Calhoun - head coach of the United States Air Force Academy football team
- Scott Higgins - MLB Umpire
- David Kennerly - Pulitzer prize-winning photographer and Presidential Photographer for Gerald Ford
- Matthew Lessner - director and screenwriter
- Kyle Loomis - football punter
- Nancy Norton - U.S. Navy vice admiral
- Alek Skarlatos - Oregon Army National Guardsman, recipient of the Knights of the Legion of Honour
- Craig Tanner - film director, film producer, and editor
- Chris Thompson - US Olympic Swimmer, Bronze Medalist Sydney 2000
- ZZ Ward - musician
