= Andrew Donnal =

American football player (born 1992)

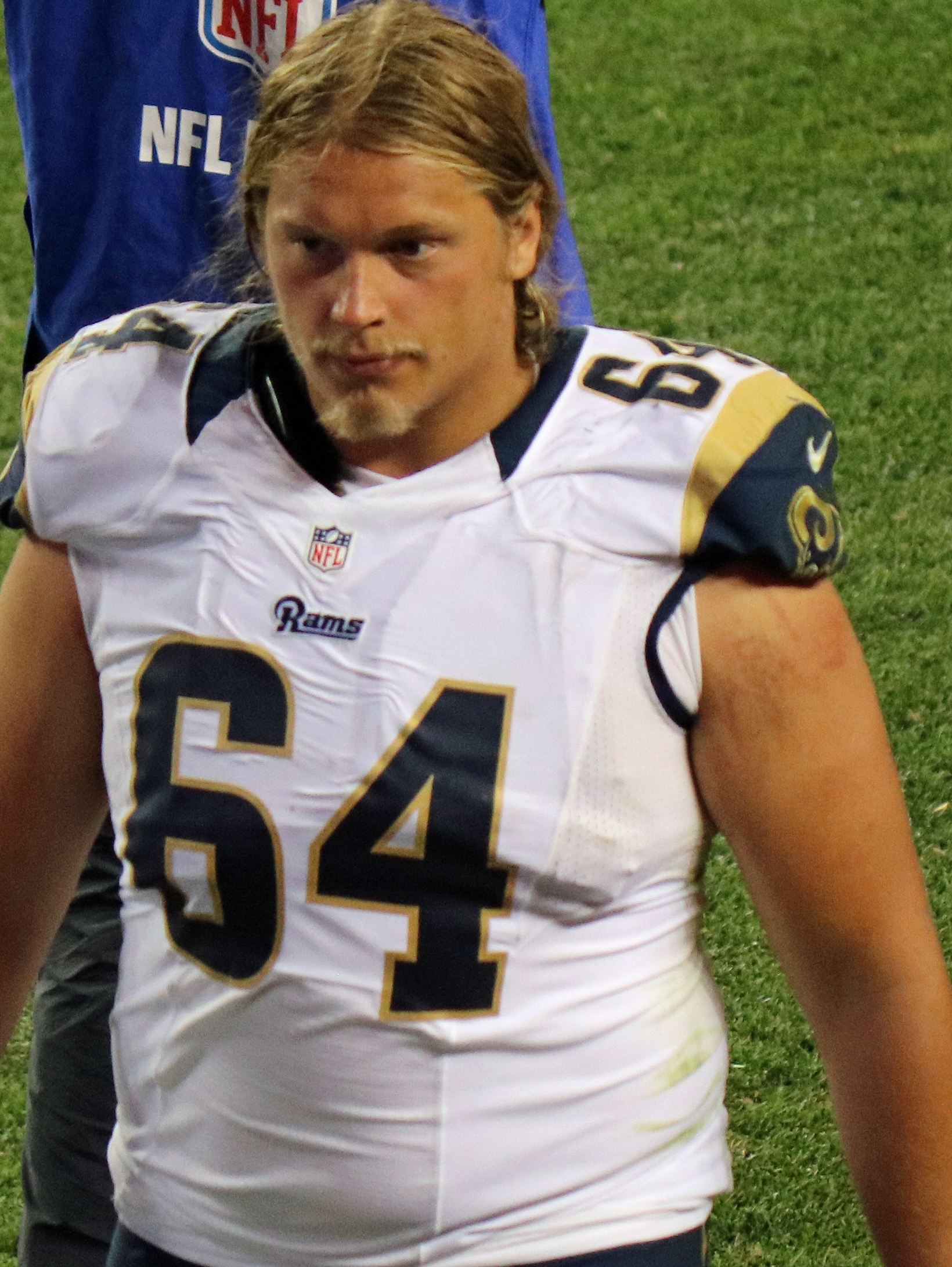
- Donnal with the Los Angeles Rams in 2016

No. 64, 70, 78
- Position: Offensive tackle

Personal information
- Born: March 3, 1992 (age 34); Monclova, Ohio, U.S.
- Listed height: 6 ft 6 in (1.98 m)
- Listed weight: 316 lb (143 kg)

Career information
- High school: Anthony Wayne (Whitehouse, Ohio)
- College: Iowa (2010–2014)
- NFL draft: 2015: 4th round, 119th overall pick

Career history
- St. Louis / Los Angeles Rams (2015–2017); Baltimore Ravens (2017); Detroit Lions (2018); Miami Dolphins (2019); Indianapolis Colts (2020)*
- * Offseason or practice squad member only

Career NFL statistics
- Games played: 31
- Games started: 6
- Stats at Pro Football Reference

Andrew Donnal (born March 3, 1992) is an American former professional football player who was an offensive tackle in the National Football League (NFL). He played college football for the Iowa Hawkeyes. His brother, Mark, played college basketball at Michigan & Clemson.

== College career ==
Donnal played college football at the University of Iowa.

== Professional career ==
Pre-draft measurables
Height	Weight	Arm length	Hand span	40-yard dash	10-yard split	20-yard split	20-yard shuttle	Three-cone drill	Vertical jump	Broad jump	Bench press
6 ft 5 7/8 in (1.98 m)	313 lb (142 kg)	33 1/2 in (0.85 m)	10 in (0.25 m)	5.31 s	1.92 s	3.14 s	4.77 s	7.51 s	32.0 in (0.81 m)	8 ft 5 in (2.57 m)	23 reps
All values from NFL Combine/Pro Day

=== St. Louis / Los Angeles Rams ===
Donnal was selected by the St. Louis Rams in the fourth round, 119th overall pick, in the 2015 NFL draft.

On November 11, 2017, Donnal was waived by the Rams.

=== Baltimore Ravens ===
On November 13, 2017, Donnal was claimed off waivers by the Baltimore Ravens, reuniting him with Iowa teammate Carl Davis. He was waived on August 31, 2018.

=== Detroit Lions ===
On September 2, 2018, Donnal was claimed off waivers by the Detroit Lions.

On March 22, 2019, Donnal re-signed with the Lions. He was released on August 31, 2019.

=== Miami Dolphins ===
On September 24, 2019, Donnal was signed by the Miami Dolphins. He was waived on November 16, 2019.

=== Indianapolis Colts ===
On December 30, 2019, Donnal signed a reserve/future contract with the Indianapolis Colts. He was placed on injured reserve on August 23, 2020. He was released with an injury settlement on September 1, 2020.
