= Ray Hamilton (tight end) =

American football player (born 1992)

No. 82
- Position: Tight end

Personal information
- Born: October 28, 1992 (age 34); Strongsville, Ohio, U.S.
- Listed height: 6 ft 5 in (1.96 m)
- Listed weight: 245 lb (111 kg)

Career information
- High school: Strongsville
- College: Iowa
- NFL draft: 2015: undrafted

Career history
- Dallas Cowboys (2015)*; Pittsburgh Steelers (2015); Washington Redskins (2015)*
- * Offseason or practice squad member only
- Stats at Pro Football Reference

Ray Hamilton (born October 28, 1992) is an American former football tight end. He played college football at University of Iowa. He signed as an undrafted free agent with the Dallas Cowboys in 2015.

== Professional career ==
=== Dallas Cowboys ===
After going unselected in the 2015 NFL draft, Hamilton signed as with the Dallas Cowboys on May 10, 2015. On August 4, Hamilton was waived by the Cowboys.

=== Pittsburgh Steelers ===
On August 6, 2015, Hamilton was claimed off waivers by the Pittsburgh Steelers. He was waive/injured by the team on August 31.

=== Washington Redskins ===
Hamilton signed with the Washington Redskins' practice squad on December 16, 2015. He was placed on the practice squad/injured list on December 21.
