= John Lowdermilk =

American football player (born 1992)

No. 37
- Position: Safety

Personal information
- Born: April 17, 1992 (age 34); Edina, Minnesota, U.S.
- Listed height: 6 ft 1 in (1.85 m)
- Listed weight: 210 lb (95 kg)

Career information
- High school: Carrollton (OH)
- College: Iowa
- NFL draft: 2015: undrafted

Career history
- San Diego Chargers (2015)*; Minnesota Vikings (2015)*; Tampa Bay Buccaneers (2016)*
- * Offseason or practice squad member only
- Stats at Pro Football Reference

John Lowdermilk (born April 17, 1992) is an American former football safety. He played college football at Iowa.

== Professional career ==
=== San Diego Chargers ===
On May 2, 2015, Lowdermilk was signed as an undrafted free agent by the San Diego Chargers. On September 5, 2015, he was waived.

=== Minnesota Vikings ===
On December 1, 2015, he was signed to the Minnesota Vikings' practice squad. On May 10, 2016, he was waived.
