= Brandon Scherff =

American football player (born 1991)

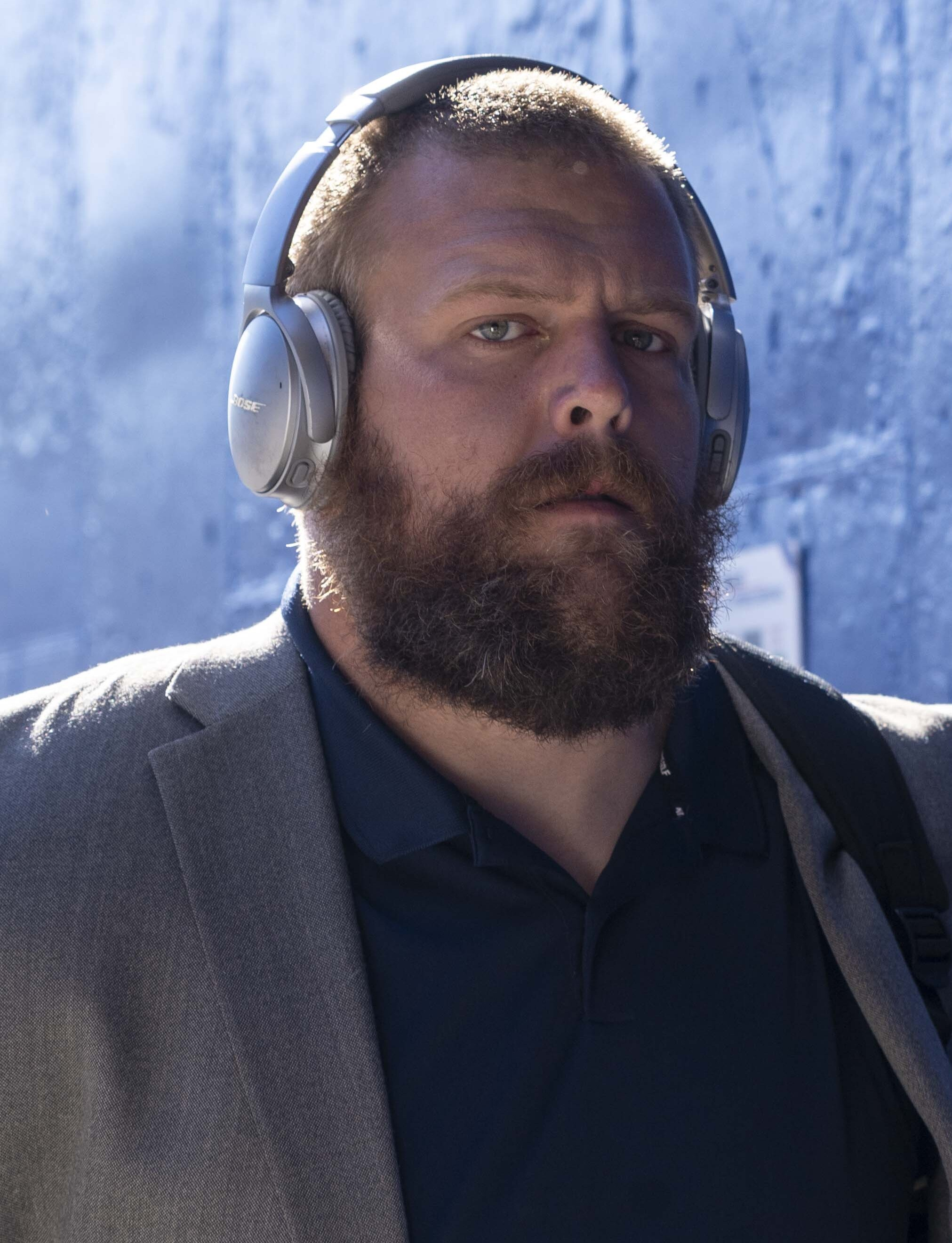
- Scherff in 2021

No. 75, 68
- Position: Guard

Personal information
- Born: December 26, 1991 (age 34); Denison, Iowa, U.S.
- Listed height: 6 ft 5 in (1.96 m)
- Listed weight: 315 lb (143 kg)

Career information
- High school: Denison
- College: Iowa (2010–2014)
- NFL draft: 2015: 1st round, 5th overall pick

Career history
- Washington Redskins / Football Team (2015–2021); Jacksonville Jaguars (2022–2024)

Awards and highlights
- First-team All-Pro (2020); 5× Pro Bowl (2016, 2017, 2019–2021); PFWA All-Rookie Team (2015); Outland Trophy (2014); Unanimous All-American (2014); Big Ten Offensive Lineman of the Year (2014); 2× First-team All-Big Ten (2013, 2014)

Career NFL statistics
- Games played: 140
- Games started: 140
- Stats at Pro Football Reference

Brandon Scherff (born December 26, 1991) is an American former professional football player who was a guard for 10 seasons in the National Football League (NFL). He played college football for the Iowa Hawkeyes, earning unanimous All-American honors in 2014. He was selected by the Washington Redskins in the first round of the 2015 NFL draft, where he played for seven seasons and earned five Pro Bowls and one All-Pro selection. He also played for the Jacksonville Jaguars.

== Early life ==
A native of Denison, Iowa, Scherff attended Denison High School, where he was a two-way lineman, earning first-team all-state honors on offense as a senior after earning second-team all-state on defense as a junior. As a sophomore, he played quarterback, passing for 1,200 yards on the season. Scherff's high school coach was Dave Wiebers. He also played basketball, where he led the state in rebounds as a senior, and baseball, where he helped his team qualify for the state tournament as a junior.

Scherff was also on the school's track & field team, where he was a standout shot putter and discus thrower, earning All-State recognition. He won two state titles in the shot put as a sophomore and a senior, placed third as a freshman and second as a junior. He won the shot put event at the 2010 Drake Relays, recording a career-best throw of 18.77 meters, setting a school record. At the 2010 Iowa State T&F Championships, he placed third in the discus throw, with a personal-best throw of 48.95 meters.

Regarded as a three-star recruit by Rivals.com, Scherff was ranked as the No. 44 offensive tackle prospect in 2010. He committed to Iowa over offers from Iowa State, Kansas, Kansas State, Missouri, and Nebraska.

== College career ==
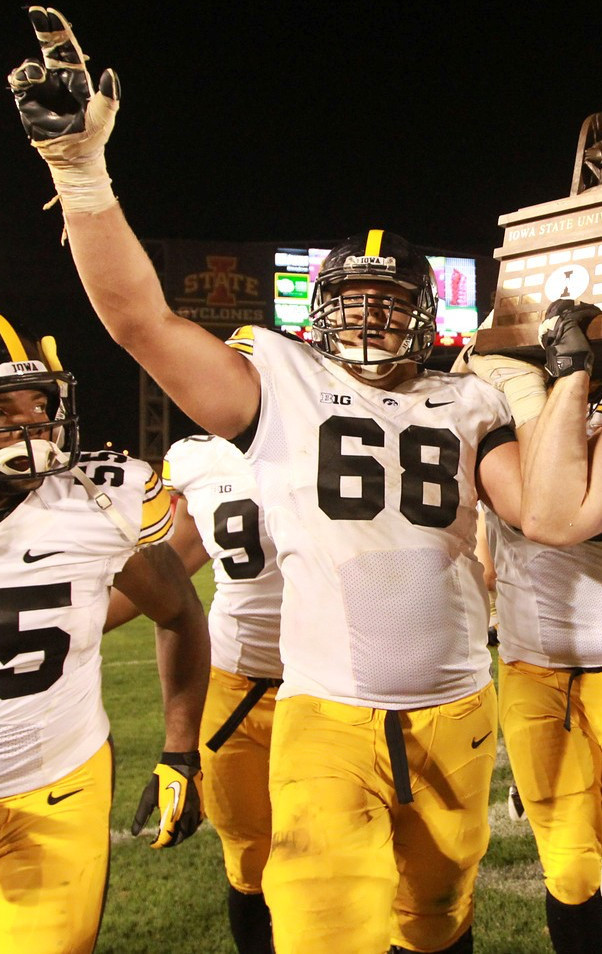
Scherff playing for the Iowa Hawkeyes in 2013

After redshirting his initial year at Iowa, Scherff saw action at left guard in eleven games on the season, starting three. In his sophomore year, he replaced Riley Reiff as the starting left tackle. He started first seven games of season at left tackle before suffering a broken fibula and a dislocated ankle in game seven, and missed the remainder of the season due to injury.

Despite being regarded one of the best offensive lineman prospects for the NFL draft after his junior year at Iowa, Scherff decided to return for his senior year. He received his B.A. degree in Leisure studies in December 2014. After the 2014 season, Scherff was awarded the Outland Trophy as the country's best interior lineman.

== Professional career ==
=== Pre-draft ===
Coming out of Iowa, Scherff was projected by the majority of analysts and scouts to be selected in the first round. He was ranked as the best offensive tackle in the draft by NFLDraftScout.com, the top interior lineman by Mike Mayock, the best offensive lineman and guard by Lance Zierlein, and top offensive tackle by Sports Illustrated. Scherff received an invitation to the NFL Combine and completed the bench press and 40, 20, and 10-yard dash. Due to a hamstring injury, he was not able to finish the entire combine. On March 23, 2015, he participated at Iowa's Pro Day and completed the drills he was unable to perform at the combine. Along with the bench, he did the vertical jump, broad jump, short shuttle, and 3-cone drill. By the time the draft was approaching, he was considered a top 10 overall pick. Many scouts and analysts were conflicted over his future position in the NFL, split on whether he was better suited to play offensive tackle or guard.

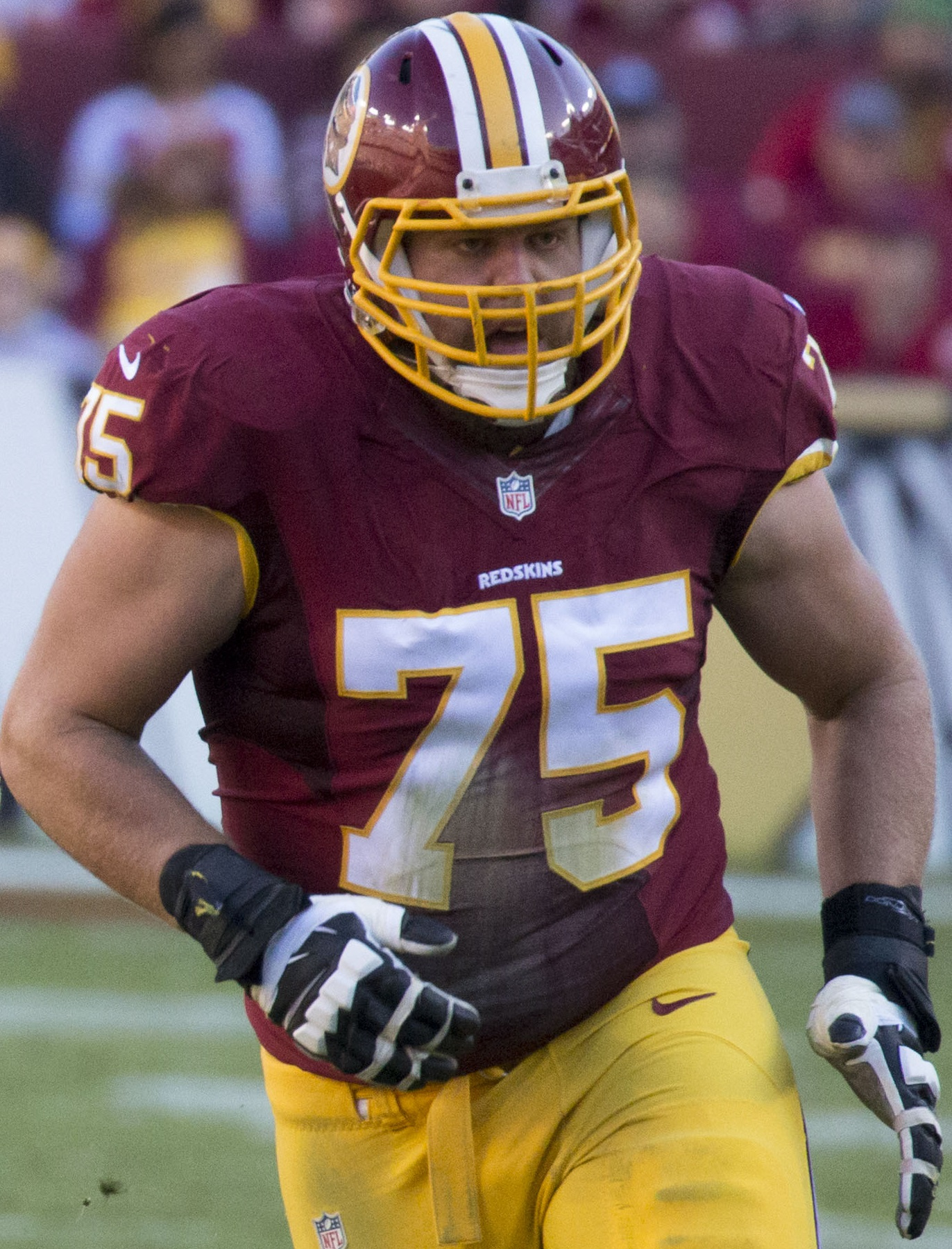
Scherff in a game during his rookie season in 2015

Pre-draft measurables
Height	Weight	Arm length	Hand span	Wingspan	40-yard dash	10-yard split	20-yard split	20-yard shuttle	Three-cone drill	Vertical jump	Broad jump	Bench press
6 ft 4 5/8 in (1.95 m)	319 lb (145 kg)	33 3/8 in (0.85 m)	11 in (0.28 m)	6 ft 8 1/4 in (2.04 m)	5.05 s	1.80 s	2.98 s	4.57 s	7.18 s	32.5 in (0.83 m)	8 ft 11 in (2.72 m)	23 reps
All values from NFL Combine/Iowa's Pro Day

=== Washington Redskins / Football Team ===
The Washington Redskins selected Scherff in the first round (fifth overall) of the 2015 NFL draft. This made him the first player from Iowa drafted in the top ten since Robert Gallery was selected second overall in 2004. On May 12, 2015, Scherff signed a fully guaranteed four-year, $21.21 million contract with the team.

He entered training camp competing with Morgan Moses for the starting right tackle position but was moved to right guard prior to the beginning of the regular season. Since he was able to handle bull rushes well, he was thought to better suit the right guard position and be responsible for a smaller area where his power would be more useful. Offensive line coach Bill Callahan named him the Redskins’ starting right guard to begin the season after winning the job over Spencer Long in the preseason.

Scherff made his professional debut in the Redskins' season-opening 17–10 loss to the Miami Dolphins. He started all 16 regular season games, played 752 snaps, and helped the Redskins finish first in the NFC East with a 9–7 record. He was named to the PFWA All-Rookie Team. In January 2016, he started his first career postseason game, as the Redskins were routed by the Green Bay Packers in the NFC Wildcard game 35–18. Scherff finished his second season starting in all 16 regular season games, and due to his highly regarded performance that year, he was voted to the 2017 Pro Bowl, his first such vote. He was also voted to the 2018 Pro Bowl the following year.

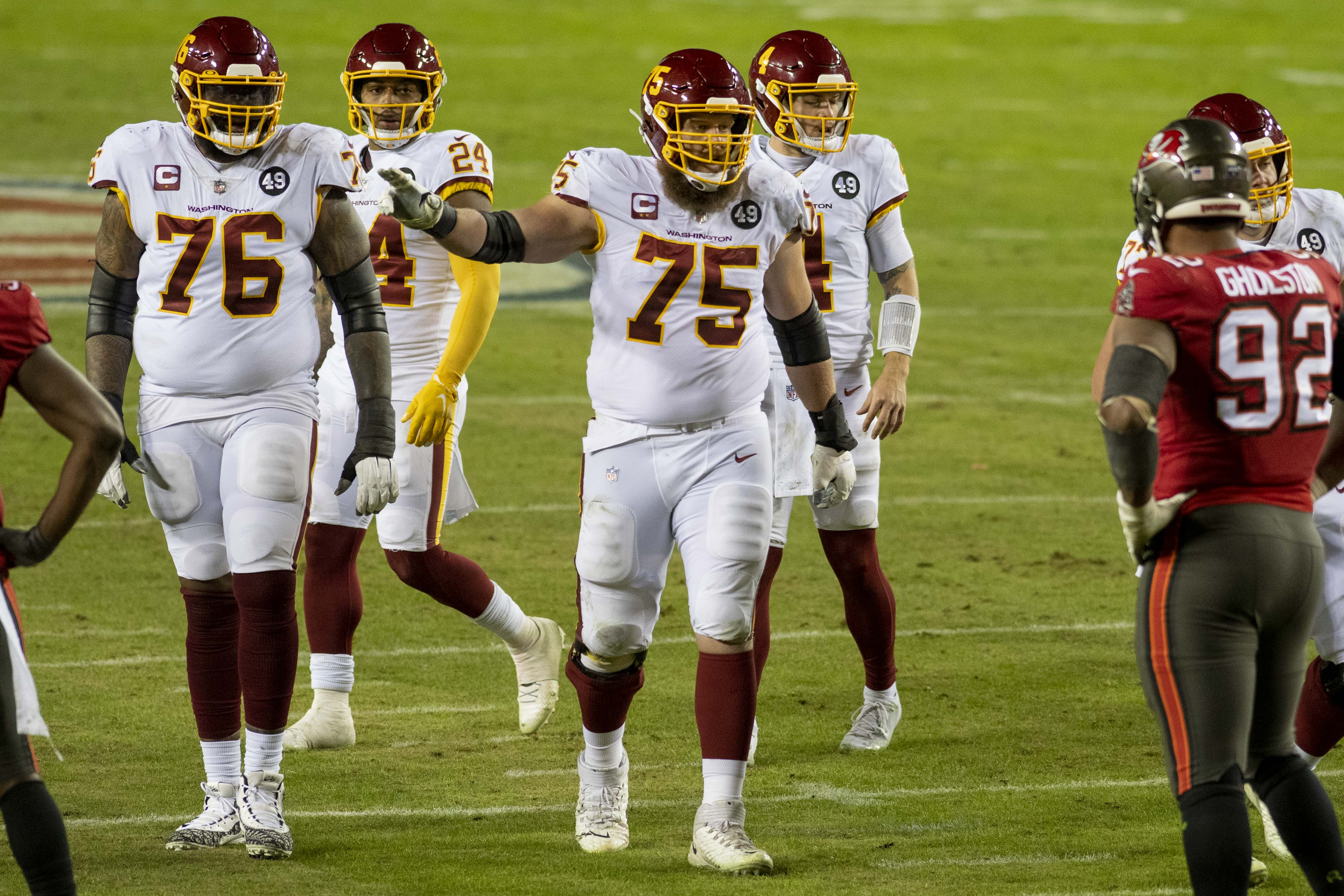
Scherff (#75) playing against the Tampa Bay Buccaneers in the 2020–21 Wild Card Playoff game.

On April 16, 2018, the Redskins picked up the fifth-year option on Scherff's contract. On November 5, he was placed on injured reserve after suffering a torn pectoral in Week 9. For the 2019 season, Scherff was voted to his third Pro Bowl. The same day, the Redskins placed Scherff on injured reserve due to elbow and shoulder injuries.

An impending free agent in 2020, the team placed the non-exclusive franchise tag on Scherff prior to the start of the new league year, with him agreeing to it on April 8, 2020. He was placed on injured reserve on September 22 following a MCL sprain he suffered during a Week 2 game against the Arizona Cardinals before being reactivated on October 16, 2020. He was named to the 2021 Pro Bowl, his fourth in his career, as well becoming the first Washington player to be named first-team All-Pro since punter Matt Turk in 1996. He was also ranked 98th on the NFL Top 100 Players of 2021 list.

In March 2021, Washington placed another non-exclusive franchise tag on Scherff, worth $18 million, which he signed days later. He was placed on the team's COVID-19 reserve list on July 31, 2021, and was activated on August 5. In the Week 4 game against the Atlanta Falcons, Scherff left the game in the second quarter due to a MCL sprain. He missed the Week 15 and 16 games against the Philadelphia Eagles and Dallas Cowboys after being placed on the COVID-19 reserve list for a second time on December 20, 2021. A week later, Scherff was placed back on the active roster.

=== Jacksonville Jaguars ===
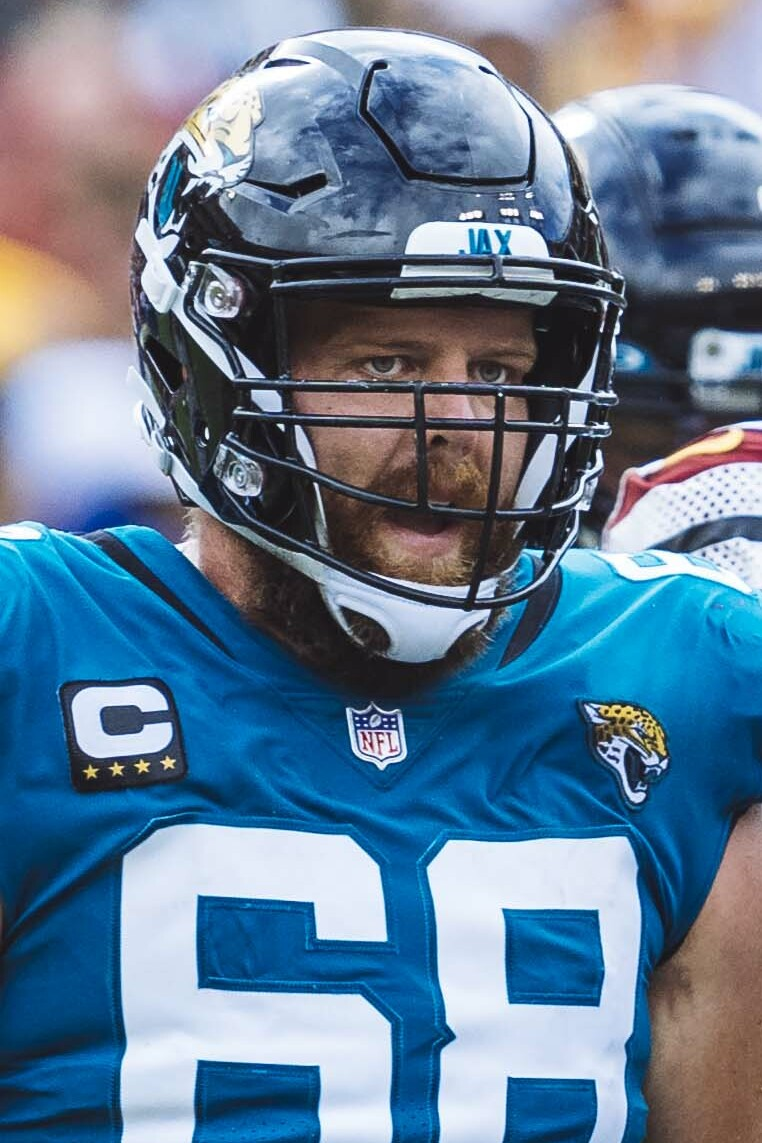
Scherff with the Jacksonville Jaguars in 2022

Scherff signed a three-year, $49.5 million contract with the Jacksonville Jaguars on March 16, 2022. He played and started at right guard for all 17 regular season games in the 2022 season. In his second career playoff run, Scherff played through an abdomen injury in the Jaguars' 2022–23 Wild Card round win against the Los Angeles Chargers and the team's loss to the Kansas City Chiefs in the Divisional round. He played as the Jaguars' starting right guard for all 17 regular season games for both the 2023 and 2024 seasons.

=== Retirement ===
On August 14, 2025, Scherff revealed in an interview that he had retired from the NFL.

== Personal life ==
Scherff is a life-long Lutheran who regularly contributes autographed memorabilia for fundraisers for his Lutheran grade school.
