= Louis Trinca-Pasat =

American football player (born 1991)

No. 62
- Position: Defensive end

Personal information
- Born: September 7, 1991 (age 35); Chicago, Illinois, U.S.
- Listed height: 6 ft 1 in (1.85 m)
- Listed weight: 300 lb (136 kg)

Career information
- High school: Lane Tech (Chicago)
- College: Iowa (2010–2014)
- NFL draft: 2015: undrafted

Career history
- St. Louis / Los Angeles Rams (2015–2016)

Awards and highlights
- Second-team All-Big Ten (2014)
- Stats at Pro Football Reference

Louis Trinca-Pasat (Romanian: Trîncă-Păsat; born September 7, 1991) is an American former professional football player who was a defensive end in the National Football League (NFL). He played college football for the Iowa Hawkeyes.

== Early life ==
Trinca-Pasat attended Lane Technical College Prep High School in Chicago, where he was a four-sport athlete, lettering in football, basketball, track, and volleyball. He was an All-conference and Academic All-state selection during his time there. He did not start playing tackle until his freshman year of college and previously played tight end, linebacker, and wide receiver.

Pasat was also a team captain as a senior and earned team MVP honors. He helped Lane to the 2008 Chicago Public League football championship with former teammate Laken Tomlinson. He was named MVP in CPS football.

Regarded as a three-star recruit by Rivals.com, Pasat was listed as the No. 45 defensive end prospect in the class of 2010. He had over 20 full-ride scholarship offers from across the country. He chose to play for the Iowa Hawkeyes over his other top choices from Wisconsin, Michigan State, and Stanford.

== College career ==
He was redshirted as a true freshman at the University of Iowa in 2010. As a redshirt freshman in 2011, Trinca-Pasat didn't get much playing time due to the fact he was still developing and improving his technique. Trinca-Pasat notched 40 tackles as sophomore in 2012. He has started all 38 games over the past three seasons. He has recorded a career-best 69 tackles in 2014, including 11.5 tackles for loss and 6.5 sacks as a redshirt senior. He was named honorable mention All-Big Ten in 2013 and earned 2nd Team All-Big Ten in 2014. He also earned Academic All-Big Ten honors in 2012, 2013, and 2014.

== Professional career ==
On May 4, 2015, Trinca-Pasat signed with the St. Louis Rams as an undrafted free agent following the 2015 NFL draft. He was released by the Rams on September 5, 2015, and was signed to the practice squad the next day.

On June 9, 2016, Trinca-Pasat was placed on injured reserve after tearing his ACL, causing him to miss the 2016 season.

On September 3, 2017, Trinca-Pasat was waived by the Rams and signed to the practice squad the next day.

== Personal life ==
Trinca-Pasat is a first-generation Romanian-American born in Chicago, Illinois. His parents, Vasile and Estera, escaped communist-ruled Romania in the late 1980s.
