= Tennessee Volunteers football statistical leaders =

Statistical leaders of the Tennessee Volunteers football program

The Tennessee Volunteers football statistical leaders are individual statistical leaders of the Tennessee Volunteers football program in various categories, including passing, rushing, receiving, total offense, defensive stats, and kicking. Within those areas, the lists identify single-game, single-season, and career leaders. The Volunteers represent University of Tennessee in the NCAA's Southeastern Conference.

Although Tennessee began competing in intercollegiate football in 1891, the school's official record book considers the "modern era" to have begun in 1930s or 1940s, depending on the particular statistic. Records from before this time period are often incomplete and inconsistent, and they are generally not included in these lists.

These lists are dominated by more recent players for several reasons:

- Since 1940, seasons have increased from 10 games to 11 and then 12 games in length.
- The NCAA didn't allow freshmen to play varsity football until 1972 (with the exception of the World War II years), allowing players to have four-year careers.
- Bowl games only began counting toward single-season and career statistics in 2002. The Volunteers have played in 10 bowl games since then, allowing players in those seasons an extra game to accumulate statistics. Similarly, the Volunteers have played in the SEC Championship Game five times since it was first played in 1992.

These stats are updated through Week 10 of the 2026 season. Active players are listed in bold.

== Passing ==
=== Passing yards ===
Career
Rank	Player	Yards	Years
1	Peyton Manning	11,201	1994 1995 1996 1997
2	Casey Clausen	9,707	2000 2001 2002 2003
3	Erik Ainge	8,700	2004 2005 2006 2007
4	Tyler Bray	7,444	2010 2011 2012
5	Joshua Dobbs	7,138	2013 2014 2015 2016
6	Andy Kelly	6,397	1988 1989 1990 1991
7	Jarrett Guarantano	6,174	2016 2017 2018 2019 2020
8	Hendon Hooker	6,080	2021 2022
9	Jeff Francis	5,867	1985 1986 1987 1988
10	Tee Martin	4,592	1996 1997 1998 1999

Single-season
Rank	Player	Yards	Year
1	Peyton Manning	3,819	1997
2	Tyler Bray	3,612	2012
3	Joey Aguilar	3,565	2025
4	Erik Ainge	3,522	2007
5	Peyton Manning	3,287	1996
6	Hendon Hooker	3,135	2022
7	Erik Ainge	2,989	2006
8	Casey Clausen	2,969	2001
9	Casey Clausen	2,968	2003
10	Peyton Manning	2,954	1995

Single game
Rank	Player	Yards	Year	Opponent
1	Tyler Bray	530	2012	Troy
2	Peyton Manning	523	1997	Kentucky
3	Peyton Manning	492	1996	Florida
4	Jarrett Guarantano	415	2019	Missouri
5	Peyton Manning	408	1996	Northwestern
6	Tyler Bray	405	2011	Cincinnati
7	Tyler Bray	404	2012	Missouri
8	Tyler Bray	401	2012	Akron
9	Andy Kelly	399	1990	Notre Dame
	Peyton Manning	399	1997	Southern Miss

Longest Pass Plays
Rank	Player	Yards	Year	Opponent
1	Casey Clausen	90	2003	Georgia
2	Andy Kelly	87	1991	Auburn
3	Nico Iamaleava	86	2024	Vanderbilt
4	Alan Cockrell	85	1983	Vanderbilt
	Jimmy Streater	85	1979	Vanderbilt
6	Erik Ainge	84	2006	Memphis
	Andy Kelly	84	1989	Arkansas
8	Joe Milton	83	2023	UCONN
9	Andy Kelly	82	1990	Auburn
	Bobby Scott	82	1969	Memphis St.

=== Passing touchdowns ===
Career
Rank	Player	TDs	Years
1	Peyton Manning	89	1994 1995 1996 1997
2	Casey Clausen	75	2000 2001 2002 2003
3	Erik Ainge	72	2004 2005 2006 2007
4	Tyler Bray	69	2010 2011 2012
5	Hendon Hooker	58	2021 2022
6	Joshua Dobbs	53	2013 2014 2015 2016
7	Jarrett Guarantano	38	2017 2018 2019 2020
8	Jonathan Crompton	36	2006 2007 2008 2009
	Heath Shuler	36	1991 1992 1993
	Andy Kelly	36	1988 1989 1990 1991

Single-season
Rank	Player	TDs	Year
1	Peyton Manning	36	1997
2	Tyler Bray	34	2012
3	Erik Ainge	31	2007
	Hendon Hooker	31	2021
5	Casey Clausen	27	2003
	Jonathan Crompton	27	2009
	Joshua Dobbs	27	2016
	Hendon Hooker	27	2022
9	Heath Shuler	25	1993
10	Joey Aguilar	24	2025

Single game
Rank	Player	TDs	Year	Opponent
1	Erik Ainge	7	2007	Kentucky
2	Andy Kelly	5	1990	Kentucky
	Heath Shuler	5	1993	Florida
	Peyton Manning	5	1997	Texas Tech
	Peyton Manning	5	1997	Kentucky
	Casey Clausen	5	2000	Arkansas
	Casey Clausen	5	2001	Memphis
	Casey Clausen	5	2003	Mississippi State
	Jonathan Crompton	5	2009	Western Kentucky
	Jonathan Crompton	5	2009	Memphis
	Tyler Bray	5	2010	Memphis
	Tyler Bray	5	2012	Troy
	Hendon Hooker	5	2021	Purdue
	Hendon Hooker	5	2022	Alabama

Consecutive Games Throwing TD Pass
Rank	Player	Games	year
1	Hendon Hooker	20	2021 2022
2	Heath Shuler	18	1992 1993
3	Joe Milton	14	2022 2023
4	Tony Robinson	13	1984 1985
5	Casey Clausen	12	2001 2002
	Joey Aguilar	12	2025
6	Erik Ainge	11	2004 2005
	Peyton Manning	11	1996
8	Tyler Bray	10	2010 2011

=== Passing Attempts ===
Career
Rank	Player	ATT	Years
1	Peyton Manning	1381	1994 1995 1996 1997
2	Casey Clausen	1270	2000 2001 2002 2003
3	Erik Ainge	1210	2004 2005 2006 2007
4	Joshua Dobbs	999	2013 2014 2015 2016
5	Tyler Bray	922	2010 2011 2012
6	Andy Kelly	846	1988 1989 1990 1991
7	Jarrett Guarantano	808	2017 2018 2019 2020
8	Jeff Francis	768	1985 1986 1987 1988
9	Hendon Hooker	631	2021 2022
10	Jonathan Crompton	629	2006 2007 2008 2009

Single-season
Rank	Player	ATT	Year
1	Erik Ainge	519	2007
2	Peyton Manning	477	1997
3	Tyler Bray	451	2012
4	Casey Clausen	412	2003
5	Joey Aguilar	404	2025
6	Jonathan Crompton	384	2009
7	Peyton Manning	380	1996
	Peyton Manning	380	1995
9	Andy Kelly	361	1991
10	Joshua Dobbs	357	2016

Single game
Rank	Player	ATT	Year	Opponent
1	Peyton Manning	65	1996	Florida
2	Andy Kelly	60	1990	Notre Dame
3	A. J. Suggs	59	2000	LSU
4	Andy Kelly	56	1991	Florida
5	Casey Clausen	55	2003	Clemson
	Andy Kelly	55	1990	Colorado
7	Tyler Bray	54	2012	Missouri
8	Peyton Manning	53	1997	Southern Mississippi
9	Peyton Manning	51	1997	Florida
10	Tyler Bray	48	2011	Florida

=== Passing Completions ===
Career
Rank	Player	CMP	Years
1	Peyton Manning	863	1994 1995 1996 1997
2	Casey Clausen	775	2000 2001 2002 2003
3	Erik Ainge	773	2004 2005 2006 2007
4	Joshua Dobbs	614	2013 2014 2015 2016
5	Tyler Bray	544	2010 2011 2012
6	Andy Kelly	514	1988 1989 1990 1991
7	Jarrett Guarantano	494	2017 2018 2019 2020
8	Jeff Francis	476	1985 1986 1987 1988
9	Hendon Hooker	435	2021 2022
10	Jonathan Crompton	348	2006 2007 2008 2009

Single-season
Rank	Player	CMP	Year
1	Erik Ainge	325	2007
2	Peyton Manning	287	1997
3	Joey Aguilar	272	2025
4	Tyler Bray	268	2012
5	Peyton Manning	244	1995
6	Peyton Manning	243	1996
7	Erik Ainge	233	2006
	Casey Clausen	233	2003
9	Hendon Hooker	229	2022
	Joe Milton	229	2023

Single game
Rank	Player	CMP	Year	Opponent
1	Tyler Bray	37	2012	Missouri
	A.J. Suggs	37	2000	LSU
	Peyton Manning	37	1996	Florida
4	Peyton Manning	35	1997	Southern Mississippi
	Peyton Manning	35	1995	Arkansas
	Andy Kelly	35	1990	Notre Dame
7	Tyler Bray	34	2011	Cincinnati
8	Andy Kelly	33	1991	Florida
	Andy Kelly	33	1990	Colorado
10	Erik Ainge	32	2007	California

Consecutive Completions
Rank	Player	CMP	Year	Opponent
1	Tee Martin	24	1998	Alabama/USC
2	Joey Aguilar	22	2025	ETSU/Georgia
3	Erik Ainge	15	2006	Air Force
4	Tyler Bray	14	2012	Georgia/Florida
5	Justin Worley	13	2014	Utah State
	Casey Clausen	13	2000	Kentucky
	Jeff Francis	13	1987	Indiana
8	Peyton Manning	12	1997	Kentucky
9	Heath Shuler	11	1993	Louisville

== Rushing ==
=== Rushing yards ===
Career
Rank	Player	Yards	Years
1	Travis Henry	3,078	1997 1998 1999 2000
2	Arian Foster	2,964	2005 2006 2007 2008
3	James Stewart	2,890	1991 1992 1993 1994
4	Johnnie Jones	2,852	1981 1982 1983 1984
5	**DeSean Bishop**	2,746	2024 2025 2026
6	Jamal Lewis	2,677	1997 1998 1999
7	Jalen Hurd	2,638	2014 2015 2016
8	Cedric Houston	2,634	2001 2002 2003 2004
9	Jay Graham	2,609	1993 1994 1995 1996
10	Dylan Sampson	2,492	2022 2023 2024

Single-season
Rank	Player	Yards	Year
1	Dylan Sampson	1,491	2024
2	Travis Stephens	1,464	2001
3	Jay Graham	1,438	1995
4	Jamal Lewis	1,364	1997
5	Montario Hardesty	1,345	2009
6	Travis Henry	1,314	2000
7	Johnnie Jones	1,290	1984
8	Jalen Hurd	1,288	2015
9	Tony Thompson	1,261	1990
10	Chuck Webb	1,236	1989

Single game
Rank	Player	Yards	Year	Opponent
1	Chuck Webb	294	1989	Mississippi
2	Chuck Webb	250	1989	Arkansas
3	Tony Thompson	248	1990	Mississippi State
4	Johnnie Jones	248	1983	Vanderbilt
5	Eric Gray	246	2019	Vanderbilt
6	Tony Thompson	236	1990	Vanderbilt
7	Johnnie Jones	234	1983	Rutgers
8	Jamal Lewis	232	1997	Georgia
9	Travis Stephens	226	2001	Florida
10	Reggie Cobb	225	1989	Auburn

Longest Rush
Rank	Player	Long	Year	Opponent
1	Kelsey Finch	99	1977	Florida
2	Eric Gray	94	2019	Vanderbilt
3	Tiyon Evans	92	2021	Missouri
4	Dick Dodson	91	1927	Transylvania
5	LaMarcus Coker	89	2006	Marshall
6	LaMarcus Coker	87	2006	Vanderbilt
	Dick Dorsey	87	1933	Virginia Tech
8	Jaylen Wright	83	2022	Vanderbilt
9	Steve Wold	82	1969	Vanderbilt
	Jaylen Wright	82	2023	UCONN

=== Rushing touchdowns ===
Career
Rank	Player	TDs	Years
1	Gene McEver	37	1928 1929 1930 1931
2	James Stewart	35	1991 1992 1993 1994
	Dylan Sampson	35	2022 2023 2024
4	Joshua Dobbs	32	2013 2014 2015 2016
	**DeSean Bishop**	32	2024 2025 2026
6	Stanley Morgan	28	1973 1974 1975 1976
7	Beattie Feathers	27	1931 1932 1933
	Andy Kozar	27	1950 1951 1952
9	Reggie Cobb	26	1987 1988 1989
	Travis Henry	26	1997 1998 1999 2000
	Montario Hardesty	26	2005 2006 2007 2008 2009

Single-season
Rank	Player	TDs	Year
1	Dylan Sampson	22	2024
2	Gene McEver	18	1929
3	Reggie Cobb	17	1987
4	Tony Thompson	16	1990
	DeSean Bishop	16	2025
5	Harold Payne	14	1951
	William Howard	14	1986
8	Beattie Feathers	13	1933
	**DeSean Bishop**	13	2026
	Haskel Stanback	13	1972
	Montario Hardesty	13	2009
	Jabari Small	13	2022

Single game
Rank	Player	TDs	Year	Opponent
1	Gene McEver	5	1929	South Carolina
2	Bob Lund	4	1945	Vanderbilt
	Harold Payne	4	1951	Washington & Lee
	Hubert Simpson	4	1979	Notre Dame
	Tony Thompson	4	1990	Vanderbilt
	James Stewart	4	1994	Georgia
	Dylan Sampson	4	2024	Kent State

=== Rushing Attempts ===
Career
Rank	Player	ATT	Years
1	Arian Foster	650	2005 2006 2007 2008
2	Jalen Hurd	589	2014 2015 2016
3	Montario Hardesty	560	2005 2006 2007 2008 2009
4	Travis Henry	556	1997 1998 1999 2000
5	Jay Graham	540	1993 1994 1995 1996
6	James Stewart	531	1991 1992 1993 1994
7	Curt Watson	529	1969 1970 1971
8	Johnnie Jones	517	1981 1982 1983 1984
9	Cedric Houston	501	2001 2002 2003 2004
10	Travis Stephens	488	1997 1998 1999 2000 2001

Single-season
Rank	Player	ATT	Year
1	Travis Stephens	291	2001
2	Montario Hardesty	282	2009
3	Jalen Hurd	277	2015
4	Jay Graham	272	1995
5	Dylan Sampson	258	2024
6	Travis Henry	253	2000
7	DeSean Bishop	248	2026
8	Arian Foster	245	2007
9	Reggie Cobb	237	1987
10	Jamal Lewis	232	1997

Single game
Rank	Player	ATT	Year	Opponent
1	Travis Stephens	41	2001	Arkansas
	Johnnie Jones	41	1983	Rutgers
3	Arian Foster	40	2005	Vanderbilt
4	Montario Hardesty	39	2009	Kentucky
	Jay Graham	39	1995	Vanderbilt
6	James Stewart	38	1991	Ole Miss
7	Travis Henry	37	2000	Florida
8	Jamal Lewis	36	1997	Vanderbilt
9	Chuck Webb	35	1989	Mississippi
	Hubert Simpson	35	1979	Kentucky

== Receiving ==
=== Receptions ===
Career
Rank	Player	Rec	Years
1	Joey Kent	183	1993 1994 1995 1996
2	Marcus Nash	177	1994 1995 1996 1997
3	Cedrick Wilson	159	1997 1998 1999 2000
4	Peerless Price	147	1995 1996 1997 1998
5	Jauan Jennings	146	2015 2016 2017 2018 2019
6	Gerald Jones	142	2007 2008 2009 2010
7	Squirrel White	131	2022 2023 2024
8	Jayson Swain	126	2003 2004 2005 2006
9	Robert Meachem	125	2004 2005 2006
10	Thomas Woods	124	1986 1987 1988 1989

Single-season
Rank	Player	Rec	Year
1	Marcus Nash	76	1997
2	Lucas Taylor	73	2007
	Justin Hunter	73	2012
4	Robert Meachem	71	2006
5	Kelley Washington	70	2001
6	Joey Kent	69	1995
7	Joey Kent	68	1996
	Braylon Staley	68	2025
8	Da'Rick Rogers	67	2011
	Jalin Hyatt	67	2022
	Squirrel White	67	2023

Single game
Rank	Player	Rec	Year	Opponent
1	Carl Pickens	13	1990	Notre Dame
2	Joey Kent	13	1995	Arkansas
3	Alvin Harper	12	1988	Washington State
4	David Martin	12	2000	LSU
5	Johnny Mills	11	1966	Auburn
	Gary Kreis	11	1969	Kentucky
	Larry Seivers	11	1976	Clemson
	Anthony Hancock	11	1981	Wisconsin
	Thomas Woods	11	1988	Kentucky
	Jeremaine Copeland	11	1997	Southern Miss
	Kelley Washington	11	2001	LSU
	Alton Howard	11	2013	Missouri
	Jalin Hyatt	11	2022	Pittsburgh

=== Receiving yards ===
Career
Rank	Player	Yards	Years
1	Joey Kent	2,814	1993 1994 1995 1996
2	Marcus Nash	2,447	1994 1995 1996 1997
3	Peerless Price	2,298	1995 1996 1997 1998
4	Jauan Jennings	2,153	2015 2016 2017 2018 2019
5	Robert Meachem	2,140	2004 2005 2006
6	Cedrick Wilson	2,137	1997 1998 1999 2000
7	Tim McGee	2,042	1982 1983 1984 1985
8	Denarius Moore	2,004	2007 2008 2009 2010
9	Larry Seivers	1,924	1973 1974 1975 1976
10	Carl Pickens	1,875	1989 1990 1991

Single-season
Rank	Player	Yards	Year
1	Robert Meachem	1,298	2006
2	Jalin Hyatt	1,267	2022
3	Marcus Nash	1,170	1997
4	Justin Hunter	1,083	2012
5	Cedric Tillman	1,081	2021
6	Joey Kent	1,080	1996
7	Joey Kent	1,055	1995
8	Da'Rick Rogers	1,040	2011
9	Chris Brazzell II	1,017	2025
10	Kelley Washington	1,010	2001

Single game
Rank	Player	Yards	Year	Opponent
1	Kelley Washington	256	2001	LSU
2	Denarius Moore	228	2010	South Carolina
3	Johnny Mills	225	1966	Kentucky
4	Cordarrelle Patterson	219	2012	Troy
5	Willie Gault	217	1981	Vanderbilt
6	Jalin Hyatt	207	2022	Alabama
7	Stanley Morgan	201	1976	TCU
	Carl Pickens	201	1990	Kentucky
9	Cedric Tillman	200	2021	Georgia
10	Peerless Price	199	1998	Florida State

=== Receiving touchdowns ===
Career
Rank	Player	TDs	Years
1	Joey Kent	25	1993 1994 1995 1996
2	Cedrick Wilson	24	1997 1998 1999 2000
3	Marcus Nash	20	1994 1995 1996 1997
4	Peerless Price	19	1995 1996 1997 1998
	Jalin Hyatt	19	2020 2021 2022
6	Cory Fleming	18	1990 1991 1992 1993
	Denarius Moore	18	2007 2008 2009 2010
	Justin Hunter	18	2010 2011 2012
	Jauan Jennings	18	2015 2016 2017 2018 2019
10	Robert Meachem	17	2004 2005 2006
	Cedric Tillman	17	2018 2019 2020 2021 2022

Single-season
Rank	Player	TDs	Year
1	Jalin Hyatt	15	2022
2	Marcus Nash	13	1997
3	Cedrick Wilson, Sr.	12	2000
	Cedric Tillman	12	2021
4	Cory Fleming	11	1993
	Robert Meachem	11	2006
	Josh Malone	11	2016
7	Peerless Price	10	1998
	Donté Stallworth	10	2001
9	Joey Kent	9	1995
	Jeremaine Copeland	9	1997
	Denarius Moore	9	2010
	Da'Rick Rogers	9	2011
	Justin Hunter	9	2012
	Chris Brazzell II	9	2025

Single game
Rank	Player	TDs	Year	Opponent
1	Jalin Hyatt	5	2022	Alabama
2	Jim Powell	3	1946	Ole Miss
	Carl Pickens	3	1990	Kentucky
	Billy Williams	3	1993	Florida
	Marcus Nash	3	1997	Kentucky
	Cedrick Wilson	3	2000	Arkansas
	Donté Stallworth	3	2001	Memphis
	Donté Stallworth	3	2001	Kentucky
	Chris Hannon	3	2003	Mississippi State
	Justin Hunter	3	2012	Georgia State
	Zach Rogers	3	2012	South Carolina
	Justin Hunter	3	2012	Troy
	Cedric Tillman	3	2021	Purdue
	Chris Brazzell II	3	2025	Georgia

== Total offense ==
Total offense is the sum of passing and rushing statistics. It does not include receiving or returns.

=== Total offense yards ===
Career
Rank	Player	Yards	Years
1	Peyton Manning	11,020	1994 1995 1996 1997
2	Casey Clausen	9,577	2000 2001 2002 2003
3	Joshua Dobbs	9,298	2013 2014 2015 2016
4	Erik Ainge	8,473	2004 2005 2006 2007
5	Tyler Bray	7,237	2010 2011 2012
6	Hendon Hooker	7,126	2021 2022
7	Andy Kelly	6,427	1988 1989 1990 1991
8	Jarrett Guarantano	6,112	2017 2018 2019 2020
9	Jeff Francis	5,900	1985 1986 1987 1988
10	Tee Martin	5,206	1996 1997 1998 1999

Single season
Rank	Player	Yards	Year
1	Peyton Manning	3,789	1997
2	Joshua Dobbs	3,777	2016
3	Joey Aguilar	3,667	2025
4	Tyler Bray	3,578	2012
5	Hendon Hooker	3,565	2022
6	Hendon Hooker	3,561	2021
7	Erik Ainge	3,490	2007
8	Peyton Manning	3,156	1996
9	Joe Milton	3,112	2023
10	Nico Iamaleava	2,980	2024

Single game
Rank	Player	Yards	Year	Opponent
1	Tyler Bray	530	2012	Troy
2	Peyton Manning	508	1997	Kentucky
3	Peyton Manning	475	1996	Florida
4	Joshua Dobbs	467	2014	South Carolina
5	Hendon Hooker	461	2022	Florida
6	Joshua Dobbs	455	2016	Texas A&M
7	Hendon Hooker	441	2022	Alabama
8	Hendon Hooker	437	2021	Purdue
9	Joshua Dobbs	430	2015	Georgia
10	Jarrett Guarantano	426	2019	Missouri

=== Touchdowns responsible for ===
"Touchdowns responsible for" is the NCAA's official term for combined passing and rushing touchdowns.

Career
Rank	Player	TDs	Years
1	Peyton Manning	101	1994 1995 1996 1997
2	Joshua Dobbs	85	2013 2014 2015 2016
3	Casey Clausen	81	2000 2001 2002 2003
4	Erik Ainge	73	2004 2005 2006 2007
5	Tyler Bray	70	2010 2011 2012
6	Hendon Hooker	68	2021 2022
7	Heath Shuler	50	1991 1992 1993
8	Tee Martin	48	1996 1997 1998 1999
9	Jarrett Guarantano	43	2017 2018 2019 2020
10	Bobby Scott	42	1968 1969 1970
	Jimmy Streater	42	1976 1977 1978 1979

Single season
Rank	Player	TDs	Year
1	Peyton Manning	39	1997
	Joshua Dobbs	39	2016
3	Hendon Hooker	36	2021
4	Tyler Bray	34	2012
5	Hendon Hooker	32	2022
6	Erik Ainge	31	2007
7	Casey Clausen	29	2003
8	Heath Shuler	28	1993
	Jonathan Crompton	28	2009
	Joey Aguilar	28	2025
10	Peyton Manning	27	1995
	Joe Milton	27	2023

Single game
Rank	Player	TDs	Year	Opponent
1	Erik Ainge	7	2007	Kentucky

== Defense ==
=== Interceptions ===
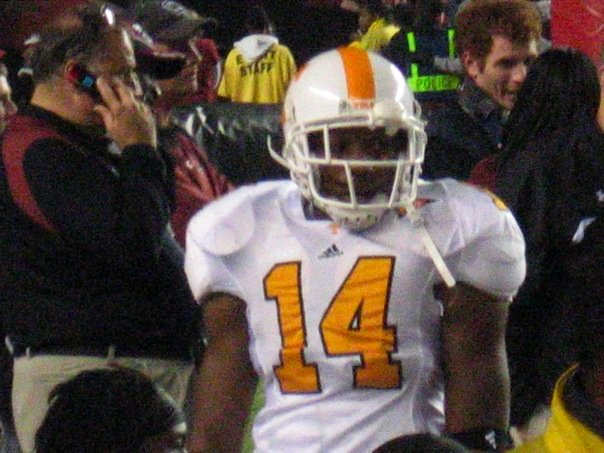
Eric Berry intercepted 14 passes in his 3-year career at Tennessee.

Career
Rank	Player	Ints	Years
1	Tim Priest	18	1968 1969 1970
2	Mike Jones	16	1967 1968 1969
3	Bill Young	15	1966 1967 1968 1969
	Conrad Graham	15	1970 1971 1972
5	Deon Grant	14	1997 1998 1999
	Eric Berry	14	2007 2008 2009
7	Bobby Majors	13	1969 1970 1971
	Charles Davis	13	1983 1984 1985 1986
	DeRon Jenkins	13	1992 1993 1994 1995
10	Terry Fair	12	1994 1995 1996 1997
	Dwayne Goodrich	12	1996 1997 1998 1999

Single-season
Rank	Player	Ints	Year
1	J.W. Sherrill	12	1949
2	Bobby Majors	10	1970
3	Bill Young	9	1968
	Tim Priest	9	1970
	Chris White	9	1985
	Deon Grant	9	1999
7	Bert Rechichar	7	1950
	Mike Jones	7	1967
	Tim Priest	7	1969
	Conrad Graham	7	1972
	Roland James	7	1978
	Eric Berry	7	2008

Single game
Rank	Player	Ints	Year	Opponent
1	Bob Lund	3	1948	North Carolina
	J.W. Sherrill	3	1949	Kentucky
	Albert Dorsey	3	1967	Alabama
	Bill Young	3	1968	Rice
	Tim Priest	3	1970	Alabama
	Chris White	3	1985	UCLA
	Preston Warren	3	1988	Boston College
	Deon Grant	3	1999	Auburn
	Bryce Thompson	3	2019	UAB

=== Tackles ===
Career
Rank	Player	Tackles	Years
1	Andy Spiva	547	1973 1974 1975 1976
2	A.J. Johnson	425	2011 2012 2013 2014
3	Jamie Rotella	413	1970 1971 1972
4	Earnest Fields	407	1988 1989 1990 1991
5	Greg Jones	377	1974 1975 1976 1977
6	Craig Puki	358	1976 1977 1978 1979
7	Jim Noonan	355	1977 1978 1979 1980
8	Kelly Ziegler	353	1984 1985 1986 1987
9	Dale Jones	350	1983 1984 1985 1986
	Rico McCoy	350	2006 2007 2008 2009

Single-season
Rank	Player	Tackles	Year
1	Andy Spiva	194	1976
2	Jamie Rotella	190	1972
3	Steve Poole	182	1974
4	Ray Nettles	174	1971
5	Carl Zander	167	1984
6	Tom Fisher	165	1964
	Andy Spiva	165	1975
8	Andy Spiva	163	1974
	Russ Williams	163	1975
10	Keith DeLong	159	1988

Single game
Rank	Player	Tackles	Year	Opponent
1	Tom Fisher	28	1964	Auburn
2	Andy Spiva	25	1975	Vanderbilt
	Greg Jones	25	1976	Alabama
	Greg Jones	25	1977	Vanderbilt
5	Andy Spiva	24	1976	Kentucky
	Lemont Holt Jeffers	24	1981	Auburn
	Kelly Ziegler	24	1987	Boston College
8	Keith DeLong	23	1988	Alabama
	Daniel Bituli	23	2017	Georgia Tech
10	Ray Nettles	22	1971	Alabama
	Andy Spiva	22	1976	Florida

=== Sacks ===
Career
Rank	Player	Sacks	Years
1	Derek Barnett	33.0	2014 2015 2016
2	Reggie White	32.0	1980 1981 1982 1983
3	Leonard Little	28.0	1995 1996 1997
4	Jonathan Brown	25.0	1994 1995 1996 1997
5	Todd Kelly	22.5	1989 1990 1991 1992
6	Parys Haralson	21.0	2002 2003 2004 2005
7	James Wilson	20.5	1990 1991 1992 1993
	John Henderson	20.5	1998 1999 2000 2001
9	Steve White	20.0	1992 1993 1994 1995

Single-season
Rank	Player	Sacks	Year
1	Reggie White	15.0	1983
2	Jonathan Brown	13.5	1997
	Derek Barnett	13.0	2016
4	John Henderson	12.0	2000
5	Todd Kelly	11.0	1992
	Leonard Little	11.0	1995
	Curt Maggitt	11.0	2014
8	Ronnie McCartney	10.0	1975
	Derek Barnett	10.0	2014
	Derek Barnett	10.0	2015

Single game
Rank	Player	Sacks	Year	Opponent
1	Corey Miller	4.5	2013	Kentucky
2	Reggie White	4.0	1983	The Citadel
	Darrell Taylor	4.0	2018	Kentucky

== Kicking ==
=== Field goals made ===
Career
Rank	Player	FGs	Years
1	Fuad Reveiz	71	1981 1982 1983 1984
2	Jeff Hall	61	1995 1996 1997 1998
3	James Wilhoit	59	2003 2004 2005 2006
4	Aaron Medley	58	2014 2015 2016 2017
5	Alex Walls	53	1999 2000 2001 2002
6	John Becksvoort	52	1991 1992 1993 1994
7	Daniel Lincoln	51	2007 2008 2009 2010
8	Brent Cimaglia	46	2017 2018 2019 2020
9	Michael Palardy	37	2010 2011 2012 2013
10	Carlos Reveiz	34	1984 1985 1986
	Max Gilbert	34	2024 2025

Single season
Rank	Player	FGs	Year
1	Fuad Reveiz	27	1982
2	Carlos Reveiz	24	1985
3	Brent Cimaglia	23	2019
4	Daniel Lincoln	21	2007
	Aaron Medley	21	2015
6	Fuad Reveiz	20	1984
	Aaron Medley	20	2014
	Max Gilbert	20	2024
9	Greg Burke	19	1990
	Jeff Hall	19	1998

Single game
Rank	Player	FGs	Year	Opponent
1	Alan Duncan	5	1978	Kentucky
	Fuad Reveiz	5	1982	Memphis State
	Fuad Reveiz	5	1982	Kentucky
	Alex Walls	5	2000	Florida
	Cooper Ranvier	5	2026	Texas A&M

=== Field goal percentage ===
Career
Rank	Player	FG%	Years
1	Charles Campbell	78.3%	2023
2	Alex Walls	77.9%	1999 2000 2001 2002
3	Chase McGrath	77.8%	2021 2022
4	Max Gilbert	75.6%	2024 2025
5	Fuad Reveiz	74.7%	1981 1982 1983 1984
6	Brent Cimaglia	74.2%	2017 2018 2019 2020
7	Michael Palardy	74.0%	2010 2011 2012 2013
8	Greg Burke	72.7%	1989 1990
9	Carlos Reveiz	72.3%	1984 1985 1986
10	James Wilhoit	72.0%	2003 2004 2005 2006
10	Aaron Medley	71.6%	2014 2015 2016 2017
