= Jalin Hyatt =

American football player (born 2001)

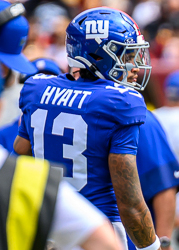
- Hyatt in 2025 with the New York Giants

No. 81 – New York Giants
- Position: Wide receiver
- Roster status: Active

Personal information
- Born: September 25, 2001 (age 25); Irmo, South Carolina, U.S.
- Listed height: 6 ft 0 in (1.83 m)
- Listed weight: 185 lb (84 kg)

Career information
- High school: Dutch Fork (Irmo)
- College: Tennessee (2020–2022)
- NFL draft: 2023: 3rd round, 73rd overall pick

Career history
- New York Giants (2023–present)

Awards and highlights
- Fred Biletnikoff Award (2022); Unanimous All-American (2022); First-team All-SEC (2022)

Career NFL statistics as of Week 10, 2026
- Receptions: 36
- Receiving yards: 470
- Stats at Pro Football Reference

Jalin Daveon Hyatt (born September 25, 2001) is an American professional football player who is a wide receiver for the New York Giants of the National Football League (NFL). He played college football for the Tennessee Volunteers, where he won the Fred Biletnikoff Award and was voted a unanimous All-American in 2022 after setting program records for single-season and single-game touchdown receptions.

== Early life ==
Hyatt was born on September 25, 2001, in Irmo, South Carolina, a suburb of nearby Columbia. He is the oldest son of Jamie, a former college basketball player and semi-professional cyclist, and Enevelyn Hyatt, who was a collegiate sprinter. Both of his parents later worked as school teachers. His younger brother Devin plays football for the Arizona Wildcats.

Hyatt attended Dutch Fork High School in Irmo. During his high school career, he set school records for career receiving yards with 3,624 and receiving touchdowns with 57. Hyatt helped Dutch Fork go undefeated and win state championships in 2018 and 2019. In the 2019 state championship game he caught 3 touchdowns, including the overtime game winner. Following his senior season, Hyatt was named a finalist for South Carolina's Mr. Football Award. He ended his high school career as a four-star prospect at wide receiver according to 247Sports. Hyatt was ranked the 144th player in the 2020 class. Despite his success in high school, Hyatt was not recruited by in-state programs Clemson and South Carolina due to their concerns of his small frame as he weighed only 153 pounds (69 kg) at the time. Concerns over his weight even led South Carolina head coach Will Muschamp to tell him "Man, you're fast, but you need to eat more peanut butter". Hyatt announced his commitment to play college football at Virginia Tech in February 2019, but he reopened his recruitment in June of the same year. On July 27, 2019, he committed to the University of Tennessee to play under head coach Jeremy Pruitt. “Jalin’s a guy that is very polished," Vols coach Pruitt said. He also said Hyatt can play all three wide receiver positions for the Vols.

College recruiting
Name	Hometown	School	Height	Weight	40^{‡}	Commit date
Jalin Hyatt; WR	Irmo, SC	Dutch Fork High School	6 ft 0 in (1.83 m)	153 lb (69 kg)	N/A	Jul 7, 2019
Jalin Hyatt; WR	Recruit ratings: Rivals: 247Sports: (80)					
Overall recruit ranking:
‡ Refers to 40-yard dash; Note: In many cases, Scout, Rivals, 247Sports, On3, and ESPN may conflict in their listings of height, weight and 40 time.; In these cases, the average was taken. ESPN grades are on a 100-point scale.; Sources: "2020 Team Ranking". Rivals.com.

== College career ==
=== 2020 season ===
On October 3, 2020, Hyatt recorded his first college reception in a 35–12 victory over Missouri. On October 24, Hyatt caught his first collegiate touchdown, a 38-yard pass from Jarrett Guarantano, in a 48–17 loss to Alabama. The touchdown was part of a season-high 86 receiving yards for Hyatt. He scored one other receiving touchdown on the season, against Vanderbilt on December 12.

Hyatt finished his freshman season with 20 receptions for 276 yards and two touchdowns.

=== 2021 season ===
Entering his sophomore season, Hyatt was expected to be a breakout player for Tennessee. However, he battled with injuries and a lack of playing time, starting just one game and ultimately finished the season with 21 receptions for 226 yards and two touchdowns.

=== 2022 season ===
Entering his junior season, Hyatt was once again viewed as a possible breakout player by many, including Tennessee head coach Josh Heupel, with Heupel citing Hyatt's improved strength and confidence as potential keys to his success. In Tennessee's second game of the year, Hyatt recorded a career-high 11 receptions in a 34–27 overtime victory at #17 Pittsburgh. The following week, Hyatt recorded his first career 100-yard game in a 166-yard performance against Akron. Following an injury to fellow wide receiver Cedric Tillman, Hyatt emerged as Tennessee's top pass-catching target. On October 15, 2022, Hyatt had a breakout performance against rival #3 Alabama, recording a career-high 207 receiving yards and catching a school-record five touchdowns in a 52–49 upset win, the Volunteers first win over Alabama since 2006. For his performance against Alabama he was named the SEC Offensive Player of the week. Hyatt followed his historic performance against Alabama with another strong performance the following week catching seven passes for 174 yards and two touchdowns in a blowout win over UT-Martin. The next week on October 29, 2022, Hyatt broke the Tennessee record for single-season touchdown receptions, catching his 14th touchdown of the season in a 44–6 win over Kentucky. The following week Tennessee traveled to play Georgia in an undefeated matchup between the teams ranked #1 in the CFP and AP Poll rankings, respectively. Hyatt and the Tennessee offense were held in check by Georgia's physical defense in a 27–13 loss in which Hyatt failed to score. Hyatt bounced back the following week against Missouri where he caught seven passes for 146 yards including a 68-yard touchdown from quarterback Hendon Hooker en route to a 66–24 victory. Hyatt returned to his home state to play against the South Carolina Gamecocks, whose stadium is located only about 20 miles (32 km) from his childhood home in the nearby town Irmo, South Carolina. Against the Gamecocks he recorded six catches for 67 yards as Tennessee lost 38–63 in an upset that all but ended the Volunteers playoff aspirations. Hyatt finished the regular season with a three-catch, 83-yard performance against rival Vanderbilt in a 56–0 win. He ended the 2022 season with 67 catches for 1,267 yards and 15 touchdowns. His 1,267 receiving yards were the second most in school history, trailing Marcus Nash's 1997 season by 31 yards. Hyatt led the SEC in receiving yards and receiving touchdowns.

At the conclusion of the season, Hyatt was named the Fred Biletnikoff Award winner for the nation's best receiver, making him the first Tennessee player to win the award. He was also named a unanimous All-American, the Volunteers' first since Eric Berry in 2009.

== Professional career ==
Pre-draft measurables
Height	Weight	Arm length	Hand span	Wingspan	40-yard dash	10-yard split	20-yard split	20-yard shuttle	Three-cone drill	Vertical jump	Broad jump
6 ft 0 1/8 in (1.83 m)	176 lb (80 kg)	32 1/2 in (0.83 m)	9 in (0.23 m)	6 ft 5 5/8 in (1.97 m)	4.40 s	1.50 s	2.54 s	4.33 s	7.06 s	40.0 in (1.02 m)	11 ft 3 in (3.43 m)
All values from NFL Combine/Pro Day

Hyatt was selected by the New York Giants in the third round as the 73rd overall pick in the 2023 NFL draft. On May 15, he signed his rookie contract with the team. He signed a 4 year contract. The deal was for $5.62 million with a 1 million dollar signing bonus.

Hyatt was held without a catch in his NFL debut. The following week against the Arizona Cardinals, he caught two passes for 89 yards, including a 58-yard reception while the Giants were trailing, 20–0, that was cited by quarterback Daniel Jones as being "key" to the Giants comeback to win the game, 31–28. During Week 12 against the New England Patriots, Hyatt won the NFL's Pepsi offensive rookie of the week. Hyatt posted his first career 100-receiving yard game as he finished with 109 receiving yards. The Giants won 10–7. He finished his rookie season with 23 receptions for 373 receiving yards in 17 games and seven starts.

In the 2024 season, he appeared in 16 games and had eight receptions for 62 yards.

In the 2025 season, he appeared in 8 games and had five receptions for 35 yards. Hyatt was criticized for never catching a touchdown in his tenure with the Giants.

Hyatt was waived after three seasons with the team on August 30, 2026; he was re-signed to the team's practice squad the following day. He was promoted to the active roster on November 7.

== Career statistics ==
=== NFL ===
Legend
**Bold**	Career high

Year	Team	Games		Receiving					Fumbles	
Year	Team	GP	GS	Rec	Yds	Y/R	Lng	TD	Fum	Lost
2023	NYG	**17**	**7**	**23**	**373**	**16.2**	**58**	0	**1**	0
2024	NYG	16	3	8	62	7.8	19	0	0	0
2025	NYG	8	0	5	35	7.0	14	0	0	0
2026	NYG	3	0	0	0	0.0	0	0	0	0
Career		44	10	36	470	13.1	58	0	1	0

=== College ===
Year	Team	Receiving					Rushing				
Year	Team	Rec	Yds	Avg	Lng	TD	Att	Yds	Avg	Lng	TD
2020	Tennessee	20	276	13.8	48	2	1	3	3.0	0	0
2021	Tennessee	21	226	10.8	41	2	1	10	10.0	10	0
2022	Tennessee	67	1,267	18.9	78	15	1	0	0.0	0	0
Career		108	1,769	16.4	78	19	3	13	4.3	10	0
