= Bishop Alemany High School =

School in Los Angeles, California, US

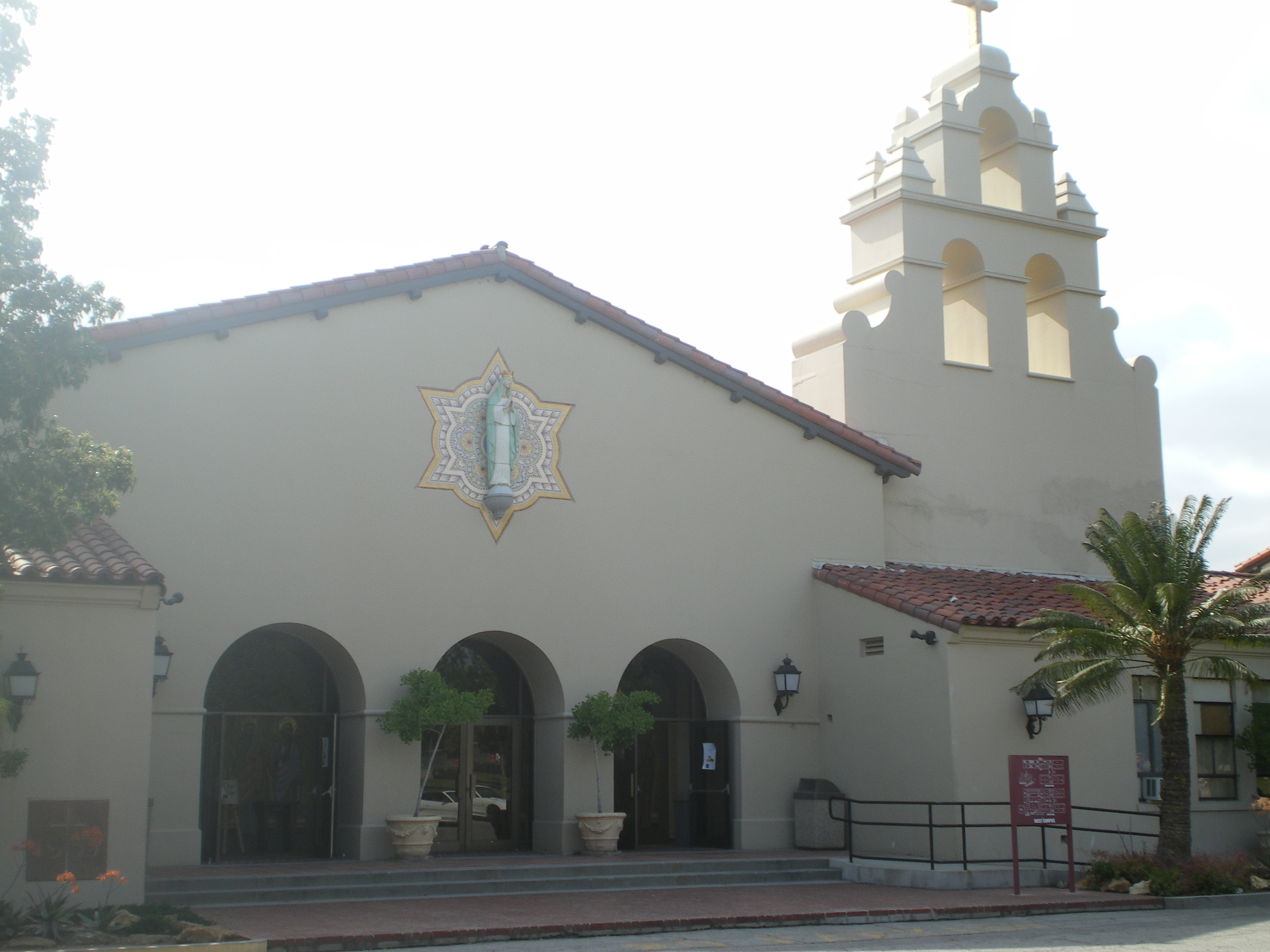

Location
- 11111 North Alemany Drive; Mission Hills, California 91345; United States; 34°16′28″N 118°27′40″W

Information
- Type: Private, Coeducational
- Motto: A Catholic Community of Excellence
- Religious affiliation: Roman Catholic
- Established: 1956
- Oversight: Archdiocese of Los Angeles
- Principal: Karina Momary
- Chaplain: Fr. Tim Grumbach
- Grades: 9-12
- Enrollment: 724
- Colors: Cardinal and Gold
- Athletics conference: CIF Southern Section; Mission League
- Nickname: Warriors (formerly Indians)
- Accreditation: Western Association of Schools and Colleges
- Yearbook: Recuerdos
- Tuition: $12,175 (As of 2021–22)
- Website: http://www.alemany.org

Bishop Alemany High School is a Catholic secondary school located in the San Fernando Valley community of Mission Hills in Los Angeles, California. It is within the San Fernando Pastoral Region of the Archdiocese of Los Angeles. The school is accredited by the Western Association of Schools and Colleges. Originally known as the Indians, the school later changed their mascot to the Warriors.

== History ==
Founded in 1947 as a school for girls, the school was originally named St. Ferdinand High School. In 1956, boys were admitted for the first time and the school was renamed to Bishop Alemany High School after Joseph Sadoc Alemany, the first archbishop of San Francisco. It was co-instructional, with separate divisions for girls and boys, until 1970 when it became coeducational.

Alemany High School was first located on the north side of Rinaldi St, just east of Sepulveda Blvd, but due to the Northridge earthquake in 1994 it sustained damage too great to be considered safe. Insomuch, it was decided to move the school across the street into the nearby buildings of Our Lady Queen of Angels Seminary at the historic San Fernando Mission. The high school shared the campus with the seminarians for one year. The seminary closed in 1995. The 1971 Sylmar earthquake did considerable damage to Alemany's campus, as well.

== Notable alumni ==
- Vernon Adams (2011) – Eastern Washington/Oregon quarterback (2012–2015), Montreal Alouettes quarterback (2016–present)
- Judy Baca (1964) – Chicana artist/muralist
- David Berganio Jr. – professional golfer
- Casey Clausen – University of Tennessee quarterback (2000–2003)
- Alyssa Diaz (2003) – actress
- Andy Dominique (1993) – MLB catcher (Boston Red Sox, Toronto Blue Jays) and former NCAA baseball standout at The University of Nevada, Reno
- Kelly Gonez (2006) – President of the LAUSD Board of Education
- Gattlin Griffith - actor
- Brandon Lewis - baseball player in the Los Angeles Dodgers organization
- Richard "Cheech" Marin (1964) – comedian & actor
- Steven Mitchell (2013) – University of Southern California wide receiver (2013-2017), Houston Texans (2019-present)
- Miller Moss – University of Louisville quarterback (2025–present), University of Southern California quarterback (2021–2024)
- Jim Pons (1961) – bass guitarist for The Leaves, The Turtles, and The Mothers of Invention
- Ephesians Prysock (2022) – Arizona defensive back (2022–2023), Washington (2024–present)
- Francia Raisa (2006) – actress
- Joe Rosselli - Former MLB player (San Francisco Giants)
- Jaylin Smith (2021) – USC cornerback (2021–present)
- Douglas Tait (1993) – producer, actor, filmmaker
- John Tejada (1992) – techno recording artist, producer, remixer, DJ, and label owner
- Charli Turner Thorne (1984) – head women's basketball coach at Arizona State University
- Robert Torti (1979) – Tony Award-nominated, Broadway actor, film & television performer
- Dohnovan West - American football player

== Notable faculty ==
- Ralph Ahn (1964–1968), math teacher and football coach
- Casey Clausen football coach
- Rick Clausen football coach
- Stuart Long (1963–2014), boxer-turned-Catholic priest; inspiration for the 2022 film Father Stu taught at the school from 1998 till 2001.
