= Brandon Johnson (wide receiver) =

American football player (born 1998)

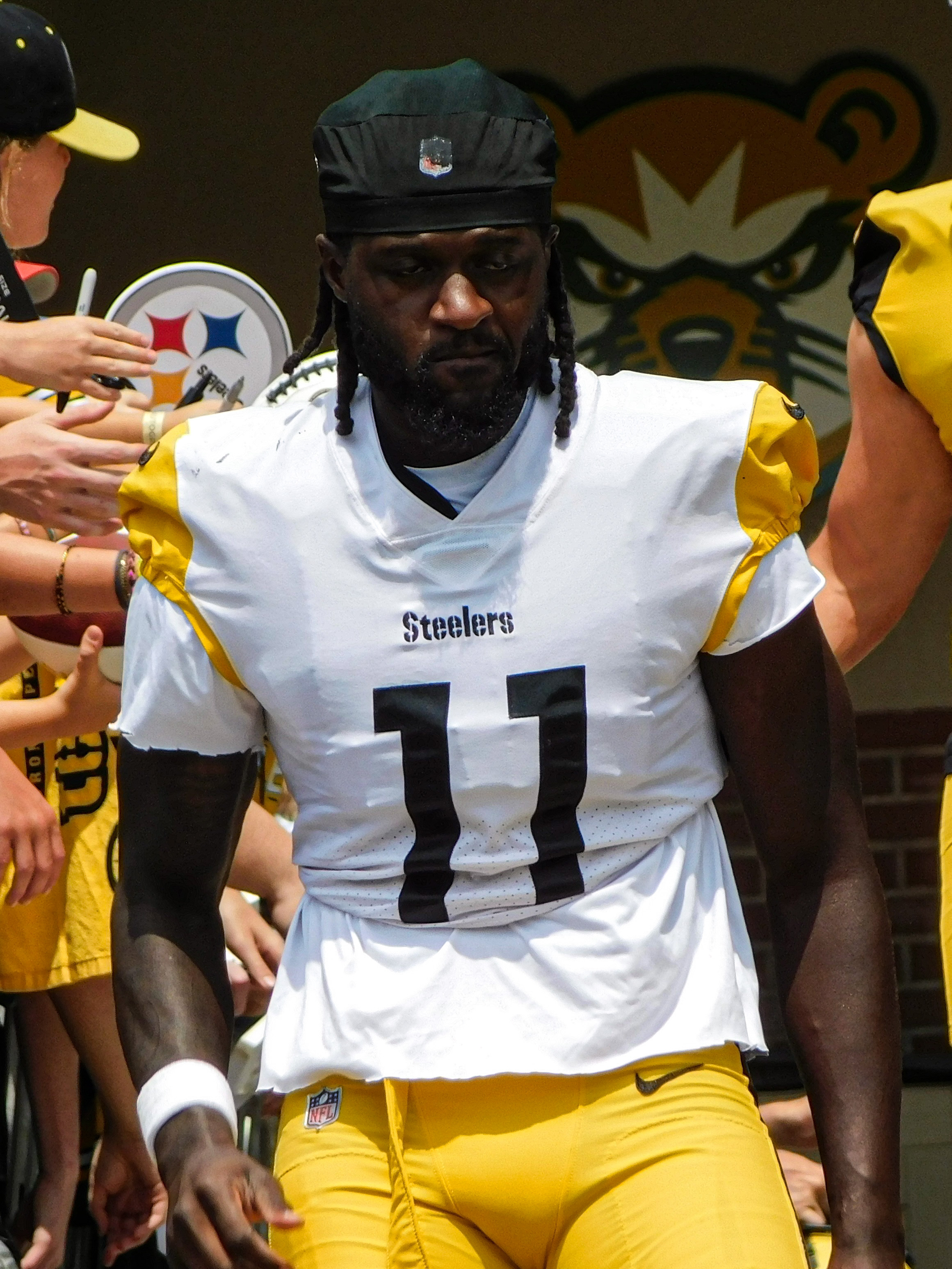
- Johnson with the Pittsburgh Steelers in 2025

No. 89 – Pittsburgh Steelers
- Position: Wide receiver
- Roster status: Active

Personal information
- Born: July 26, 1998 (age 28); Fort Lauderdale, Florida, U.S.
- Listed height: 6 ft 2 in (1.88 m)
- Listed weight: 208 lb (94 kg)

Career information
- High school: American Heritage School
- College: Tennessee (2016–2020); UCF (2021)
- NFL draft: 2022: undrafted

Career history
- Denver Broncos (2022–2023); Pittsburgh Steelers (2024); Tampa Bay Buccaneers (2025)*; Pittsburgh Steelers (2025)*; Denver Broncos (2025)*; Pittsburgh Steelers (2026)*; Las Vegas Raiders (2026)*; Pittsburgh Steelers (2026–present)
- * Offseason or practice squad member only

Career NFL statistics as of 2026
- Receptions: 27
- Receiving yards: 344
- Receiving average: 12.7
- Receiving touchdowns: 5
- Stats at Pro Football Reference

Brandon Edward Johnson (born July 26, 1998) is an American professional football wide receiver for the Pittsburgh Steelers of the National Football League (NFL). He played college football for the Tennessee Volunteers and UCF Knights and was signed by the Denver Broncos as an undrafted free agent in 2022. He has also played for the Las Vegas Raiders.

== Early life ==
Johnson attended and played high school football at American Heritage School.

== College career ==
=== Tennessee ===
Johnson started his collegiate career at the University of Tennessee. He played there from 2016 to 2020 under head coaches Butch Jones and Jeremy Pruitt. He totaled 79 receptions for 969 receiving yards and one receiving touchdown to go along with a punt return touchdown in his time as a Volunteer.

=== UCF ===
Johnson transferred to UCF for the 2021 season. He totaled 38 receptions for 565 receiving yards and a team-leading 11 receiving touchdowns.

=== Statistics ===
Year	Team	GP	Receiving			
Year	Team	GP	Rec	Yds	Avg	TD
2016	Tennessee	9	7	93	13.3	0
2017	Tennessee	12	37	482	13.0	1
2018	Tennessee	12	14	132	9.4	0
2019	Tennessee	4	2	31	15.5	0
2020	Tennessee	9	19	231	12.2	0
2021	UCF	13	38	565	14.9	11
Career		59	117	1,534	13.1	12

== Professional career ==
Pre-draft measurables
Height	Weight	Arm length	Hand span	Wingspan	40-yard dash	10-yard split	20-yard split	20-yard shuttle	Three-cone drill	Vertical jump	Broad jump
6 ft 2 3/8 in (1.89 m)	195 lb (88 kg)	32 3/8 in (0.82 m)	9 7/8 in (0.25 m)	6 ft 8 1/8 in (2.04 m)	4.61 s	1.63 s	2.64 s	4.52 s	7.62 s	35.0 in (0.89 m)	9 ft 8 in (2.95 m)
All values from Pro Day

=== Denver Broncos (first stint) ===
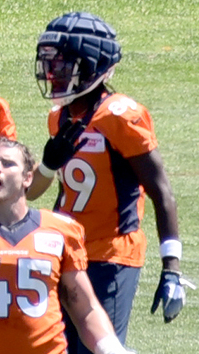
Johnson with the Denver Broncos in 2023

On April 30, 2022, the Denver Broncos signed Johnson as an undrafted free agent. On August 30, Johnson was waived with an injury settlement after suffering an ankle sprain. On October 18, Johnson re–signed with the Broncos, and joined the team's practice squad. On November 19, Johnson was elevated to the active roster. On November 20, Johnson made his NFL debut against the Las Vegas Raiders totalling one reception for two yards in the 22–16 loss. On November 21, Johnson was reverted to the practice squad. On November 26, Johnson was elevated to the active roster. In Week 12, against the Carolina Panthers, he scored his first NFL touchdown on a one-yard reception in the 23–10 loss. In his rookie season, Johnson appeared in seven games and recorded six receptions for 42 receiving yards and one touchdown.

In Week 2 of the 2023 season against the Washington Commanders, with the Broncos trailing 35–27 with 3 seconds remaining in regulation, Johnson hauled in a 50-yard Hail Mary touchdown pass from Russell Wilson as time expired. However, Denver went on to lose the game 35–33 after failing to convert on the ensuing two-point conversion. This was controversial due to an uncalled pass interference penalty. He was placed on injured reserve on October 28, 2023, after suffering a hamstring injury in practice. He was activated on December 2. He finished the 2023 season with 19 receptions for 284 receiving yards and four receiving touchdowns in 13 games and two starts.

On August 27, 2024, Johnson was waived by the Broncos.

=== Pittsburgh Steelers (first stint) ===
On August 28, 2024, Johnson was signed to the Pittsburgh Steelers' practice squad. In the 2024 season, he appeared in three games. He signed a reserve/future contract on January 14, 2025.

On August 26, 2025, Johnson was waived by the Steelers with an injury designation as part of final roster cuts. He was released from injured reserve on August 29.

=== Tampa Bay Buccaneers ===
On October 22, 2025, Johnson was signed to the Tampa Bay Buccaneers' practice squad. He was released by the Buccaneers on December 15.

=== Pittsburgh Steelers (second stint) ===
On December 24, 2025, Johnson was signed to the Pittsburgh Steelers' practice squad.

=== Denver Broncos (second stint) ===
On January 20, 2026, Johnson signed with the Denver Broncos' practice squad following injuries to Troy Franklin and Pat Bryant.

=== Pittsburgh Steelers (third stint) ===
On April 28, 2026, Johnson signed with the Pittsburgh Steelers on a one-year contract. On June 9, he was released by the Steelers.

=== Las Vegas Raiders ===
On June 10, 2026, Johnson signed with the Las Vegas Raiders. He was released by the Raiders as a part of final roster cuts on August 30.

=== Pittsburgh Steelers (fourth stint) ===
On September 1, 2026, Johnson was signed to the Pittsburgh Steelers' practice squad. He was activated on October 24.

== Personal life ==
His father, Charles Johnson, played in Major League Baseball.

Johnson's cousin is former Cincinnati Bengals and New England Patriots wide receiver Chad Johnson. He is also cousins with former professional baseball players Fred and Terry McGriff.
