= Joey Kent =

American football player (born 1974)

No. 86
- Position: Wide receiver

Personal information
- Born: April 23, 1974 (age 52); Huntsville, Alabama, U.S.
- Listed height: 6 ft 1 in (1.85 m)
- Listed weight: 191 lb (87 kg)

Career information
- High school: Johnson (Huntsville)
- College: Tennessee
- NFL draft: 1997: 2nd round, 46th overall pick

Career history
- Tennessee Oilers / Titans (1997–1999); Indianapolis Colts (2000); Minnesota Vikings (2000)

Awards and highlights
- 2× First-team All-SEC (1995, 1996)

Career NFL statistics
- Receptions: 13
- Receiving yards: 159
- Touchdowns: 1
- Stats at Pro Football Reference

Joseph Edward Kent III (born April 23, 1974) is an American former professional football player who was a wide receiver in the National Football League (NFL). He was selected by the Tennessee Oilers in the second round of the 1997 NFL draft. He played college football for the Tennessee Volunteers where he holds the school records for career receptions, receiving yards and receiving touchdowns. In Week 15 of the 1997 season, he scored his lone NFL touchdown on an 11-yard reception against the Bengals. In 1999, the Titans made it to Super Bowl XXXIV, in which Kent appeared as a substitute. However, they lost to the Kurt Warner-led St. Louis Rams. In addition, Kent played for the Indianapolis Colts and Minnesota Vikings.

== College career ==
Kent played at the University of Tennessee. In a matchup against rival Alabama in the 1995 season, Kent scored on an 80-yard reception from Peyton Manning on the first play from scrimmage in the eventual victory. He recorded two seasons going over 1,000 receiving yards in the 1995 and 1996 seasons. He was named to the 2023 SEC Football Legends Class.
