= Hendon Hooker =

American football player (born 1998)

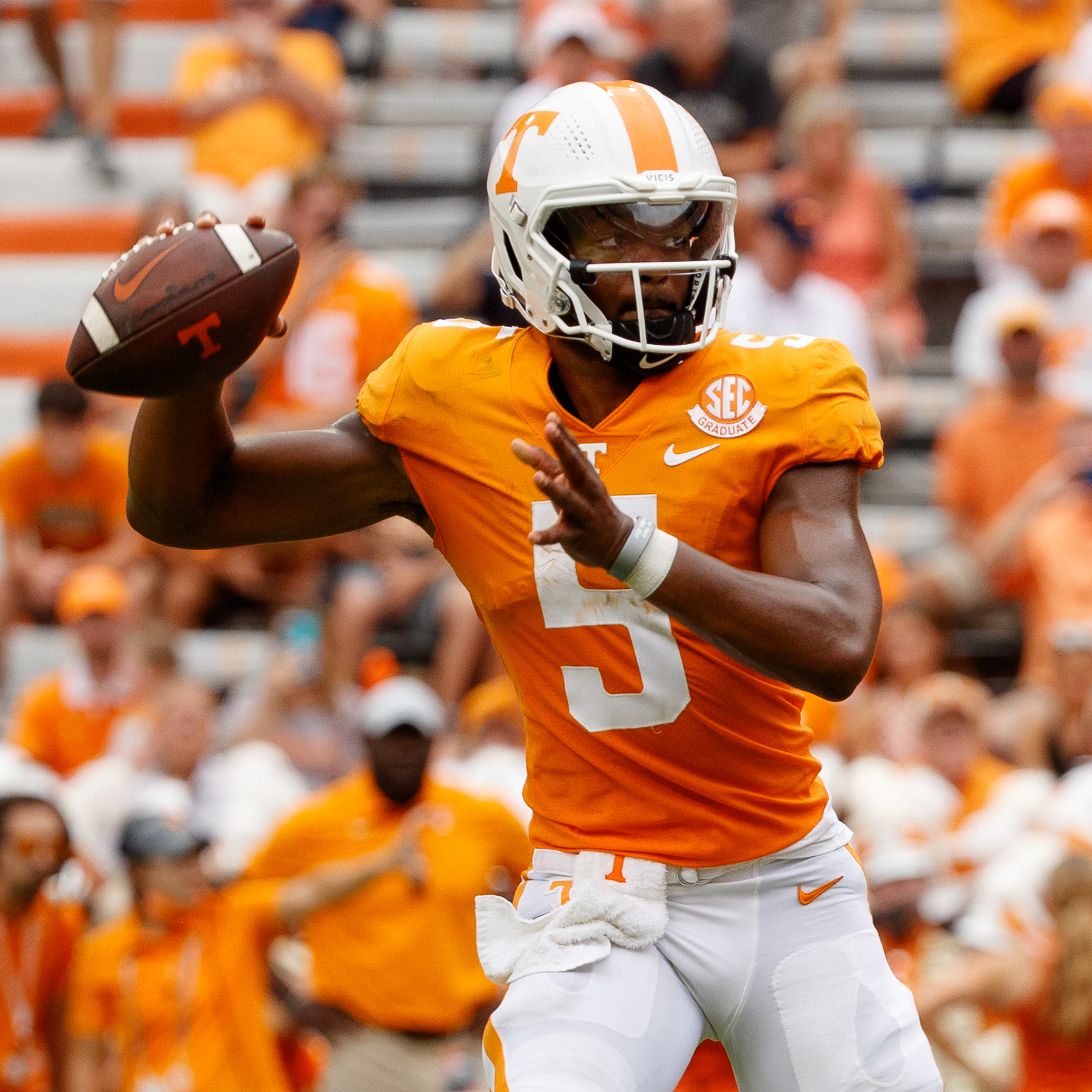
- Hooker with the Tennessee Volunteers in 2022

No. 16 – Tennessee Titans
- Position: Quarterback
- Roster status: Practice squad

Personal information
- Born: January 13, 1998 (age 28); Greensboro, North Carolina, U.S.
- Listed height: 6 ft 3 in (1.91 m)
- Listed weight: 220 lb (100 kg)

Career information
- High school: James B. Dudley (Greensboro)
- College: Virginia Tech (2017–2020); Tennessee (2021–2022)
- NFL draft: 2023: 3rd round, 68th overall pick

Career history
- Detroit Lions (2023–2024); Carolina Panthers (2025); New York Jets (2025); Tennessee Titans (2026–present)*
- * Offseason or practice squad member only

Awards and highlights
- SEC Offensive Player of the Year (2022); First-team All-SEC (2022)

Career NFL statistics as of 2025
- Passing attempts: 9
- Passing completions: 6
- Completion percentage: 66.7%
- TD–INT: 0–0
- Passing yards: 62
- Passer rating: 86.3
- Stats at Pro Football Reference

Alan Hendon Hooker (born January 13, 1998) is an American professional football quarterback for the Tennessee Titans of the National Football League (NFL). He played college football for the Virginia Tech Hokies and Tennessee Volunteers, where he was named the SEC Offensive Player of the Year in 2022. Hooker was selected by the Detroit Lions in the third round of the 2023 NFL draft.

== Early life ==
Hooker attended James B. Dudley High School in Greensboro, North Carolina. During his high school career he passed for 6,027 yards with 55 touchdowns and rushed for 2,975 yards and 48 touchdowns. He finished his career as Dudley's all-time passing leader and received NC Preps' All-State Player of the Year and was named to the Associated Press All-State team twice. While at Dudley, they won two state championships in football, with Hooker winning the 2016 4A state championship MVP with six touchdowns. He also played basketball, scoring over 1,000 points and named a three-time All-Metro conference selection. Finishing his career at Dudley, Hooker was a four-star recruit according to 247Sports and a three-star quarterback by Rivals.com.

=== High school statistics ===
==== Football ====
Season	Team	GP	Passing								Rushing			
Season	Team	GP	Cmp	Att	Pct	Yds	Y/A	TD	Int	Rtg	Att	Yds	Avg	TD
2014	Dudley	10	67	108	62.0	1,141	17.0	10	3	117.1	79	522	6.6	6
2015	Dudley	15	127	198	64.1	2,234	17.6	17	6	118.5	122	1,217	10	15
2016	Dudley	16	137	221	62.0	2,652	19.4	28	5	133.9	120	1,236	8.4	27
Career	41	331	527	62.8	6,027	18.2	55	14	125.8	348	2,975	72.6	48	

==== Basketball ====
Year	Team	GP	GS	MPG	FG%	3P%	FT%	RPG	APG	SPG	BPG	PPG
2014–15	Dudley	21	–	–	46.0	17.0	48.0	4.5	1.7	0.8	0.3	14.0
2015–16	Dudley	12	–	–	57.0	30.0	61.0	5.9	3.3	0.8	1.0	12.6
2016–17	Dudley	6	–	–	55.0	0.0	18.0	2.3	0.8	0.5	0.0	4.3
Career		39	–	–	50.0	24.0	49.0	4.6	2.1	0.7	0.5	12.1

== College career ==
Coming out of high school, Hooker received numerous Power 5 offers. After visiting Virginia Tech's campus, Hooker committed to them in 2016, stating, "When we set foot on the big stage, on that game field, it just felt right". As a freshman in 2017, he competed with redshirt freshman Josh Jackson for the starting position at quarterback, but would ultimately end up getting redshirted before the beginning of the season in 2018.

=== Virginia Tech ===
Hooker was named the starter in 2019 after their current quarterback Ryan Willis threw seven interceptions in four games. After the Hokies started off with two wins and two losses, Hendon won five games when he played, allowing the Hokies to be eligible for a bowl game. Hooker helped Virginia Tech qualify for the Belk Bowl against Kentucky in the 2019 season. In Virginia Tech's 8–5 season in 2019, Hooker had 1,555 passing yards, 13 passing touchdowns, and two interceptions to go along with 123 carries for 356 rushing yards and five rushing touchdowns.

In the 2020 season, Hooker appeared in eight of the Hokies' 11 games. On October 17, against Boston College, he passed for 111 yards and a touchdown to go along with 18 carries for 164 rushing yards and three rushing touchdowns in the 40–14 victory. Two weeks later, against Louisville, he completed all ten of his pass attempts for 183 passing yards to go along with 19 carries for 68 rushing yards and three rushing touchdowns in the 42–35 victory. On November 7, against Liberty, he had 217 passing yards and three passing touchdowns to go along with 20 carries for 156 rushing yards and one rushing touchdown in the 38–35 loss. He finished with 1,339 passing yards, nine touchdowns, and five interceptions to go along with 120 carries for 620 rushing yards and nine rushing touchdowns in the Hokies' 5–6 season.

During his career with Virginia Tech, he started 15 of 25 games, completing 197 of 312 passes for 2,894 yards, 22 touchdowns and seven interceptions.

=== Tennessee ===
In 2021, Hooker transferred to the University of Tennessee. Under head coach Josh Heupel, he entered the 2021 season as the backup to Joe Milton. Milton suffered an injury against Pitt in the season's second game. Hooker came into the game in relief and helped lead Tennessee to a close loss to the Panthers. Hooker took over the starting job and produced numerous productive outings for Tennessee. He had six games with at least three passing touchdowns, which included a 316-yard, four-touchdown game in a 45–42 victory over Kentucky and a 378-yard, five-touchdown game in a 48–45 overtime loss to Purdue in the Music City Bowl. He finished the 2021 season with 2,945 passing yards, 31 passing touchdowns, and three interceptions to go along with 166 carries for 616 rushing yards and five rushing touchdowns. He led the SEC in adjusted passing yards per attempt and passing efficiency rating. The Volunteers finished 2021 with a 7–6 record.

Hooker returned to the Volunteers in 2022 for his final collegiate season. He started the season with two passing touchdowns and two rushing touchdowns in a 59–10 victory over Ball State. In the following game against #17 Pitt, he passed for 325 yards and two touchdowns in the 34–27 overtime victory. He threw the go-ahead touchdown pass in overtime to Cedric Tillman. Following a 63–6 victory over Akron, the Vols reached a #11 ranking in the AP Poll. In the following game, Hooker passed for 349 yards and two passing touchdowns to go along with 112 rushing yards and a rushing touchdown in a 38–33 victory over rival Florida. Hooker helped lead the #8 Vols to a 5–0 start following a 40–13 victory over #25 LSU. Tennessee's successful start to the season gave them a #6 ranking to set up an undefeated showdown with longtime rival #3 Alabama. Hooker passed for 385 yards, five passing touchdowns, and one interception in the 52–49 victory over the Crimson Tide, Tennessee's first victory over Alabama since 2006. With the score tied at 49 late in the fourth quarter, Hooker led a drive down the field with two clutch throws to Ramel Keyton and Bru McCoy to set up Chase McGrath's game-winning 40-yard field goal. All of Hooker's passing touchdowns in the Alabama game went to future Biletnikoff Award winner Jalin Hyatt. Hooker helped lead Tennessee to their first 6–0 start since 1998. Tennessee was propelled to a #3 ranking. In the following two games, a 65–24 victory over UT Martin and a 44–6 victory over rival #19 Kentucky, Hooker passed for three touchdowns in both games. For the first time in program history, Tennessee was named #1 in the first College Football Playoff rankings before a showdown with undefeated Georgia, which was ranked #1 in the AP Poll. Tennessee reached #2 in the AP Poll, their highest ranking since 2001. Hooker passed for 195 yards and an interception in the 27–13 loss to Georgia. On Senior Day, Hooker passed for 355 yards and three touchdowns to go along with a rushing touchdown in a 66–24 victory over Missouri. Hooker’s collegiate career came to an abrupt end against South Carolina when he suffered a torn ACL in a non contact injury in the fourth quarter of the 63–38 loss. In his second season with the Volunteers, Hooker started 11 games, completed 229 of 329 attempted passes for 3,135 yards, 27 touchdowns, and two interceptions. Towards the end of the season, Hooker finished fifth place in Heisman Trophy voting. He became the first player from Tennessee to finish in the top five of Heisman Trophy voting since Peyton Manning finished runner-up in 1997. He was named First-Team All-SEC and earned SEC Offensive Player of the Year for his 2022 season. He led the SEC in pass completion percentage and passing efficiency rating and the NCAA in passing yards per attempt and adjusted passing yards per attempt. Hooker was instrumental for a resurgent season for the Tennessee Volunteers football program. Tennessee's 11 wins, of which Hooker was the starting quarterback for nine of them, were the most for the program since 2001 and tied for the second-most in school history.

=== College statistics ===
Season	Team	Games			Passing								Rushing			
Season	Team	GP	GS	Record	Cmp	Att	Pct	Yds	Avg	TD	Int	Rtg	Att	Yds	Avg	TD
2017	Virginia Tech	Redshirt														
2018	Virginia Tech	3	0	—	0	0	0.0	0	0.0	0	0	0	4	57	14.3	1
2019	Virginia Tech	10	9	6–3	99	162	61.1	1,555	9.6	13	2	165.8	123	356	2.9	5
2020	Virginia Tech	8	7	2–5	98	150	65.3	1,339	8.9	9	5	153.5	120	620	5.2	9
2021	Tennessee	13	11	6–5	206	303	68.0	2,945	9.8	31	3	181.4	166	616	3.7	5
2022	Tennessee	11	11	9–2	229	329	69.6	3,135	9.5	27	2	175.5	104	430	4.1	5
Career		45	38	23–15	632	944	67.0	8,974	9.5	80	12	172.2	517	2,079	4.0	25

== Professional career ==
Pre-draft measurables
Height	Weight	Arm length	Hand span	Wingspan
6 ft 3 1/4 in (1.91 m)	217 lb (98 kg)	33 in (0.84 m)	10 1/2 in (0.27 m)	6 ft 7 1/4 in (2.01 m)
All values from NFL Combine

=== Detroit Lions ===
Hooker was drafted by the Detroit Lions in the third round (68th overall) of the 2023 NFL draft. He was placed on the reserve/non-football injury list on July 20, 2023, as he continued to recover from an ACL injury sustained while at Tennessee. Hooker was activated from the non-football injury list on December 19, 2023, but he did not play in his rookie season.

On October 13, 2024, Hooker made his NFL debut in Week 6 of the 2024 season, relieving starter Jared Goff in the fourth quarter of a 47–9 blowout victory against the Dallas Cowboys.

On August 25, 2025, Hooker was waived by the Lions.

=== Carolina Panthers ===
On August 27, 2025, Hooker was signed to the Carolina Panthers' practice squad. He was released on November 4.

=== New York Jets ===
On December 18, 2025, Hooker signed to the New York Jets' practice squad. He was promoted to the active roster on January 3, 2026.

=== Tennessee Titans ===
On April 1, 2026, Hooker signed with the Tennessee Titans. He entered into training camp behind quarterbacks Cam Ward, Mitchell Trubisky, and Will Levis. On August 30, Hooker was waived by Tennessee as a part of final roster cuts; he was re-signed to the team's practice squad the following day.

=== NFL statistics ===
Year	Team	Games			Passing									Rushing					Sacks		Fumbles	
Year	Team	GP	GS	Record	Cmp	Att	Pct	Yds	Y/A	Lng	TD	Int	Rtg	Att	Yds	Avg	Lng	TD	Sck	SckY	Fum	Lost
2023	DET	0	0	—	Did not play																	
2024	DET	3	0	—	6	9	66.7	62	6.9	21	0	0	86.3	5	2	0.4	3	0	1	9	0	0
2025	CAR	0	0	—	Did not play																	
2025	NYJ	0	0	—	Did not play																	
Career		3	0	—	6	9	66.7	62	6.9	21	0	0	86.3	5	2	0.4	3	0	1	9	0	0

== Personal life ==
Hooker was born in Greensboro, North Carolina, on January 13, 1998. He is the son of the North Carolina A&T Hall of Fame quarterback Alan Hooker and wife Wendy Hooker. Hooker has two siblings: His older sister Nile, who has helped Hooker manage his social media presence and NIL deals, and younger brother Alston, who plays quarterback at North Carolina A&T.

Hooker is a Christian, stating it was a "blessing" to have parents who got him and his siblings to be active in church at an early age. Hooker has credited his parents for his work ethic. He says his dad’s influence and mentorship while serving in the youth ministry at their church has helped him understand he "can use the game [football] to spread the message of Jesus Christ".

With his knowledge of the Bible and a desire to influence the younger generation and his younger cousin Landon, Hooker and his brother, Alston, created a children's book called The ABCs of Scripture for Athletes. Hendon’s goal was for the work to be "a positive influence in the lives of kids in his community.” The book uses a sports themed alphabet to help kids learn scripture.
