= Jarrett Guarantano =

American football player (born 1997)

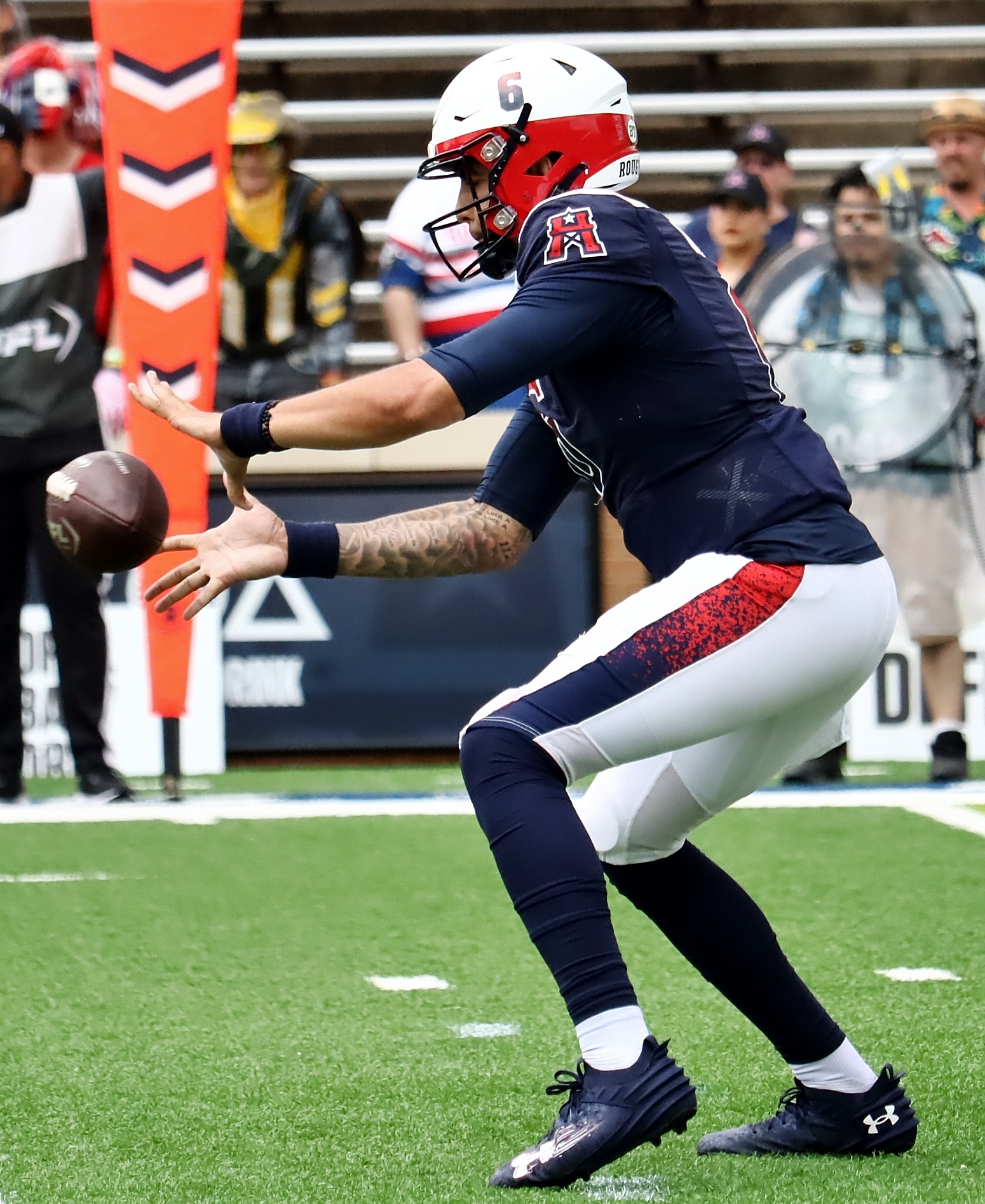
- Guarantano with the Houston Roughnecks in 2024

Profile
- Position: Quarterback

Personal information
- Born: November 14, 1997 (age 29); Lodi, New Jersey, U.S.
- Listed height: 6 ft 3 in (1.91 m)
- Listed weight: 219 lb (99 kg)

Career information
- High school: Bergen Catholic (Oradell, New Jersey)
- College: Tennessee (2016–2020); Washington State (2021)
- NFL draft: 2022: undrafted

Career history
- Arizona Cardinals (2022)*; Denver Broncos (2022); Houston Roughnecks (2024); San Antonio Brahmas (2025)
- * Offseason or practice squad member only
- Stats at Pro Football Reference

Jarrett James Guarantano (born November 14, 1997) is an American professional football quarterback. He played college football for the Tennessee Volunteers and Washington State Cougars.

== Early life ==
Guarantano grew up Lodi, New Jersey, and attended Bergen Catholic where he played football. His father James Guarantano was a wide receiver at Rutgers from 1989 to 1992 and joined later the Rutgers Hall of Fame and later played in the NFL and CFL. Guarantano threw for 3,028 yards and 28 touchdowns and rushed for 523 yards and 12 touchdowns in his prep career. He earned All-Bergen County First-team honors and was a 2016 Under Armour All-America. He was a four-star recruit coming out of high school and top 4 dual-threat quarterback in the nation. He committed to Tennessee over more than 40 scholarship offers from other programs.

== College career ==
=== Tennessee ===
==== 2016 season ====
In his first season, Guarantano took a redshirt year to learn from senior Joshua Dobbs in 2016.

==== 2017 season ====
Guarantano started the 2017 season as the backup to Quinten Dormady. In the early part of the season, he appeared in relief roles. He threw his first collegiate touchdown to Jeff George in Tennessee's 42–7 victory over Indiana State in the second game. Following a 41–0 loss to Georgia, which was Tennessee's worst home loss since 1905, Guarantano was named the starter for the next game against South Carolina. The remainder of the season was a struggle for the Volunteers program with only one victory over Southern Miss. Tennessee finished 4–8. The program lost eight games for the time in program history to go along with a winless record in conference play. Tennessee's performance in the 2017 season resulted in the firing of head coach Butch Jones. He finished his second year with 997 passing yards and four touchdowns with a completion percentage of 62.0 when starting in six games and appeared in nine contests.

==== 2018 season ====
Guarantano remained the starter going into the 2018 season under new head coach Jeremy Pruitt. After a 2–3 start, Guarantano played his most complete game in 30–24 upset victory at #21 Auburn. He passed for 328 yards and two touchdowns against the Tigers. Tennessee had two shots at bowl eligibility late in the 2018 season but dropped both games against Missouri and Vanderbilt to finish 5–7. As a sophomore he started all 12 games and passed for 1,907 yards and 12 touchdowns with three interceptions (the lowest since Condredge Holloway in 1972). He broke the school record for consecutive pass attempts without an interception by tossing 166 straight passes without a pick, breaking the old mark of 143 set by Casey Clausen in 2003.

==== 2019 season ====
The 2019 season started disastrous for the Tennessee Volunteers. Tennessee dropped the season opener to Georgia State 38–30. The loss marked the first for Tennessee to a Group of 5 school since 2008. Guarantano passed for 311 yards, two touchdowns, and one interception in the loss. In the following game, he passed for 176 yards, two touchdowns, and one interception in a 29–26 2OT home loss to BYU. The Vols started 0–2 for the first time since 1988. Tennessee dropped two of their next three games, losses to top-ten teams Florida and Georgia, to drop to 1–4. Guarantano was benched prior to the Georgia game for Brian Maurer. In the following game, against Mississippi State, Maurer was injured and Guarantano came into the game in relief. He threw a late touchdown to Tyler Byrd to give the Volunteers a 10-point lead in the fourth quarter to help clinch the 20–10 victory. In the following game at #1 Alabama, Tennessee had driven to the Alabama goalline trailing 28–13 in the fourth quarter. Guarantano went against the play call and tried a quarterback sneak and fumbled resulting in a Trevon Diggs 100-yard fumble return for a touchdown. In the next game, he bounced back with a solid 229-yard, two-touchdown game against South Carolina in a 41–21 victory. He broke his non-throwing wrist against South Carolina but never missed a game. Following victories over UAB and Kentucky, Guarantano passed for 415 yards and two touchdowns in a 24–20 victory over Missouri to clinch bowl eligibility for Tennessee. Following a victory over Vanderbilt, Tennessee finished with a 7–5 record and earned an appearance in the Gator Bowl against Indiana. Guarantano passed for 221 yards and two interceptions as Tennessee won 23–22 in a comeback victory. As a junior, he threw for 2,158 yards and 16 touchdowns while starting seven games and playing in all 13. Tennessee's momentum helped earn them a preseason #25 ranking for the 2020 season.

==== 2020 season ====
Tennessee moved up to a #16 ranking before their 2020 regular season opener. Guarantano was named the starter for the opener against South Carolina. Guarantano helped lead Tennessee to a 2–0 start before a 44–21 loss to #3 Georgia Bulldogs sent the season spiraling. The following game against #23 Kentucky saw Guarantano throw consecutive pick-sixes to set the tone of the 34–7 defeat. The 27-point loss marked the worst defeat in the series for Tennessee since Kentucky won 27–0 in 1935. The next three games saw Guarantano injured and eventually benched for the rest of the season. Guarantano threw for 1,112 yards and six touchdowns with four interceptions in seven games during the 2020 season that was cut short due to the COVID-19 pandemic.

=== Washington State ===
Guarantano transferred for the 2021 season to Washington State as a graduate transfer where he appeared in two games with the Cougars, throwing for 304 yards and one touchdown. He was named to the Golden Arm Award watch list in August 2021. He completed his bachelor's degree in psychology in December 2019 and a master's in Agriculture.

== Professional career ==
Pre-draft measurables
Height	Weight	Arm length	Hand span	40-yard dash	10-yard split	20-yard split	20-yard shuttle	Three-cone drill	Vertical jump	Broad jump
6 ft 2 7/8 in (1.90 m)	219 lb (99 kg)	34 1/8 in (0.87 m)	10 1/8 in (0.26 m)	4.91 s	1.73 s	2.89 s	4.58 s	7.43 s	32.0 in (0.81 m)	9 ft 9 in (2.97 m)
All values from the Washington State Pro Day

=== Arizona Cardinals ===
After going undrafted in the 2022 NFL draft, he signed after a rookie minicamp as an UDFA-contract with the Arizona Cardinals. He played his first game for Arizona in the first preseason game against the Cincinnati Bengals. He played in every game of the preseason but was cut on August 30, 2022. He was re-signed to the practice squad on September 7. He was released on October 4.

=== Denver Broncos ===
At the end of November he had a tryout with the Denver Broncos but failed to get signed. On December 5, 2022, Guarantano was signed to the Broncos' practice squad. He was promoted to the active roster on December 20. On July 25, 2023, Guarantano was waived by the Broncos.

=== Houston Roughnecks ===
Guarantano signed with the Houston Gamblers of the USFL on December 22, 2023.

Guarantano and all other Houston Gamblers players and coaches were all transferred to the Houston Roughnecks after it was announced that the Gamblers took on the identity of their XFL counterpart, the Roughnecks.

=== San Antonio Brahmas ===
On January 30, 2025, Guarantano signed with the San Antonio Brahmas of the United Football League (UFL).

== Career statistics ==
=== UFL ===
Regular season statistics
Year	Team	Games			Passing								Rushing			
Year	Team	GP	GS	Record	Cmp	Att	Pct	Yds	Y/A	TD	Int	Rtg	Att	Yds	Avg	TD
2024	HOU	5	3	0–3	30	47	63.8	301	6.4	0	0	82.0	5	36	7.2	1
2025	SA	1	0	—	6	15	40.0	29	1.9	0	1	20.1	3	24	8.0	0
Career		6	3	0–3	36	62	58.1	330	5.3	0	1	65.9	8	60	7.5	1

=== College ===
Season	Team	Games			Passing							Rushing			
Season	Team	GP	GS	Record	Cmp	Att	Pct	Yds	TD	Int	Rtg	Att	Yds	Avg	TD
2016	Tennessee	0	0	—	Redshirted (redshirt)										
2017	Tennessee	9	6	1–5	86	139	61.9	997	4	2	128.7	66	−39	−0.6	1
2018	Tennessee	12	12	5–7	153	246	62.2	1,907	12	3	141.0	40	−94	−2.4	0
2019	Tennessee	13	7	4–3	152	257	59.1	2,158	16	8	144.0	49	54	1.1	0
2020	Tennessee	7	7	2–5	103	166	62.0	1,112	6	4	125.4	41	17	0.4	4
2021	Washington State	3	2	0–2	33	49	67.3	304	1	3	114.0	19	−6	−0.3	0
Career		44	34	12–22	527	857	61.5	6,478	39	20	135.3	215	−68	−0.4	5
