= 2017 Tennessee Volunteers football team =

American college football season

2017 Tennessee Volunteers football
- Conference: Southeastern Conference
- Eastern Division
- Record: 4–8 (0–8 SEC)
- Head coach: Butch Jones (5th season; first 10 games); Brady Hoke (interim; final 2 games)
- Offensive coordinator: Larry Scott (1st season)
- Offensive scheme: Multiple
- Defensive coordinator: Bob Shoop (2nd season)
- Base defense: 4–3
- Home stadium: Neyland Stadium

2017 Southeastern Conference football standings
	Conf.			Overall
Team	W		L	W		L
Eastern Division
No. 2 Georgia x$^	7	–	1	13	–	2
South Carolina	5	–	3	9	–	4
Kentucky	4	–	4	7	–	6
Missouri	4	–	4	7	–	6
Florida	3	–	5	4	–	7
Vanderbilt	1	–	7	5	–	7
Tennessee	0	–	8	4	–	8
Western Division
No. 10 Auburn xy	7	–	1	10	–	4
No. 1 Alabama x#^	7	–	1	13	–	1
No. 18 LSU	6	–	2	9	–	4
No. 19 Mississippi State	4	–	4	9	–	4
Texas A&M	4	–	4	7	–	6
Ole Miss*	3	–	5	6	–	6
Arkansas	1	–	7	4	–	8
Championship: Georgia 28, Auburn 7
# – College Football Playoff champion; ^ – College Football Playoff participant; $ – Conference champion; x – Division champion/co-champions; y – Championship game participant; * Ole Miss ineligible for postseason due to NCAA sanctions; Rankings from AP Poll

The 2017 Tennessee Volunteers football team represented the University of Tennessee in the 2017 NCAA Division I FBS football season. The Volunteers played their home games at Neyland Stadium in Knoxville, Tennessee and competed in the Eastern Division of the Southeastern Conference (SEC). They were led by fifth-year head coach Butch Jones until his firing on November 12. Brady Hoke was named the interim head coach for the remainder of the season.

The team finished the season 4–8, 0–8 in SEC play for last place in the Eastern Division and the SEC. This was the first team in Tennessee's football history to lose eight games in a season, as well as the first to not win an SEC game since becoming a charter member of the conference in 1932.

== Offseason ==
=== Departures ===
Departures of scholarship players from the 2016 team.

Name	Number	Pos.	Height	Weight	Year	Hometown	Notes	Ref
Derek Barnett	9	DE	6'3	265	JR	Nashville, TN	Entered 2017 NFL draft	
Alvin Kamara	6	RB	5'10	215	RS JR	Norcross, GA	Entered 2017 NFL draft	
Josh Malone	3	WR	6'3	200	JR	Gallatin, TN	Entered 2017 NFL draft	
Dylan Wiesman	71	OL	6'4	310	Senior	Cincinnati, OH	Graduated	
Kenny Bynum	51	LB	6'1	235	RS Senior	Jacksonville, FL	Graduated	
Corey Vereen	50	DL	6'2	249	Senior	Winter Garden, FL	Graduated	
Cameron Sutton	23	DB	5'11	186	Senior	Jonesboro, GA	Graduated	
Jalen Reeves-Maybin	21	LB	6'0	230	Senior	Clarksville, TN	Graduated	
Jason Croom	18	TE	6'5	246	RS Senior	Norcross, GA	Graduated	
Malik Foreman	13	DB	5'10	190	Senior	Kingsport, TN	Graduated	
Joshua Dobbs	11	QB	6'3	210	Senior	Alpharetta, GA	Graduated	
LaTroy Lewis	4	DL	6'4	256	RS Senior	Akron, OH	Graduated	

== Personnel ==
=== Roster and staff ===
2017 Tennessee Volunteers football team roster
Players
Coaches
Offense

Pos.	#	Name	Class
QB	2	Jarrett Guarantano	Fr
RB	4	John Kelly (S)	Jr
QB	7	Will McBride	Fr
WR	8	Latrell Williams	So
WR	9	Marquez Callaway	So
WR	10	Tyler Byrd	So
QB	12	Quinten Dormady	Jr
QB	14	Zac Jancek	So
WR	17	Brandon Johnson	So
WR	19	Jeff George	Sr
WR	25	Josh Smith	Sr
WR	26	Ben Powlas	So
RB	27	Carlin Fils-Aime	So
WR	28	Will Martinez	Jr
RB	31	Stedman Love	So
RB	35	Taeler Dowdy	So
RB	37	Jayson Sparks	Jr
WR	38	Jaye Rochell	Sr
RB	42	Chip Omer	So
TE	44	Jakob Johnson	Sr
OL	51	Drew Richmond	So
OL	55	Coleman Thomas	Sr
OL	56	Riley Locklear	Fr
OL	57	Nathan Niehaus	So
OL	60	Austin Sanders	Sr
OL	63	Brett Kendrick	Sr
OL	64	Tommy Sprague	So
OL	66	Jack Jones	Jr
OL	67	Joe Keeler	So
OL	68	Marcus Tatum	So
OL	69	Brian Garvey	So
OL	70	Ryan Johnson	Fr
OL	73	Trey Smith	Fr
OL	75	Jashon Robertson	Sr
OL	76	Chance Hall	Jr
OL	77	Devante Brooks	Fr
OL	79	Thomas Edwards	Sr
TE	80	Eli Wolf	So
TE	81	Austin Pope	So
TE	82	Ethan Wolf	Sr
WR	83	Cooper Melton	Fr
WR	85	Thomas Orradre	Jr
TE	86	Andrew Craig	Fr
WR	87	Logan Fetzner	Sr
TE	89	Will Jumper	So

Defense

Pos.	#	Name	Class
DL	1	Jonathan Kongbo	Jr
DL	2	Shy Tuttle	Jr
DB	3	Marquill Osborne	So
DL	5	Kyle Phillips	Jr
DB	7	Rashaan Gaulden	Jr
DB	8	Justin Martin	Sr
LB	11	Austin Smith (injured)	Jr
DB	12	Emmanuel Moseley	Sr
DL	13	Deandre Johnson	Fr
LB	14	Quart'e Sapp	So
LB	17	Dillon Bates	Jr
DB	18	Nigel Warrior	So
DL	19	Darrell Taylor	So
LB	20	Cortez McDowell (injured)	Sr
LB	21	Shanon Reid	Fr
DB	22	Micah Abernathy	Jr
DB	24	Todd Kelly Jr. (injured)	Sr
DB	26	Stephen Griffin	Jr
DB	28	Baylen Buchanan	So
DB	29	Evan Berry	Sr
DB	30	Devin Williams	Sr
DB	33	MaLeik Gatewood	So
LB	34	Darrin Kirkland Jr (injured)	Jr
LB	35	Daniel Bituli	So
LB	36	Gavin Bryant	Jr
DB	37	Charles West	So
DB	38	D.J. Henderson	Jr
DL	39	Kendal Vickers	Sr
LB	41	Elliott Berry	Sr
LB	43	Matt Ballard	So
LB	46	DaJour Maddox	So
LB	47	Landon Knoll	So
LB	48	Ja'Quain Blakely	Fr
DL	52	Andrew Butcher	So
LB	53	Colton Jumper	Jr
DL	55	Quay Picou	Jr
DL	88	Brandon Benedict	Fr
DL	94	Mykelle McDaniel	So
DL	96	Joey Cave	Fr
DL	97	Paul Bain	Jr
DL	98	Alexis Johnson	Sr
DL	99	Kahlil McKenzie	Jr

Special teams

Pos.	#	Name	Class
PK	25	Aaron Medley	Sr
PK	30	Holden Foster	Sr
H	31	Parker Henry	Jr
P	36	Grayson Linde	So
H	39	Alex Jones	So
PK	43	Laszlo Toser	So
LS	46	Riley Lovingood	So
LS	52	Elijah Medford	Jr
LS	59	Jake Yelich	So
LS	64	Logan Punch	So
P	93	Trevor Daniel	Sr
PK	97	Jackson Morris	So

Head coach

- Butch Jones – 5th year (fired 11/12)

Coordinators/assistant coaches

- Brady Hoke (Associate head coach/defensive line coach/interim head coach) – 1st year
- Larry Scott (offensive coordinator/tight ends) – 1st year
- Bob Shoop (defensive coordinator) – 2nd year
- Robert Gillespie (assistant head coach/running backs/recruiting coordinator) – 5th year
- Tommy Thigpen (Linebackers/defensive run game coordinator) – 5th year
- Mike Canales (quarterbacks coach) – 1st year
- Charlton Warren (defensive backs/special teams coordinator) – 1st year
- Kevin Beard (wide receivers coach) – 1st year
- Walt Wells (offensive line coach) – 1st year
- Steve Stripling (director of Football Program Development) – 1st year
- Rock Gullickson (director of strength and conditioning) – 1st year

Legend

- (C) Team captain
- (S) Suspended
- (I) Ineligible
- Injured
- Redshirt

Roster

=== 2017 recruiting class ===
College recruiting (2017)
Name	Hometown	School	Height	Weight	Commit date
Terrell Bailey; CB	Marrero, LA	John Ehret	5 ft 11 in (1.80 m)	175 lb (79 kg)	Sep 15, 2016
Terrell Bailey; CB	Recruit ratings: Scout: Rivals: 247Sports: ESPN:				
Marquez Bembry; ATH	Atlanta, GA	Mount Vernon Presbyterian	6 ft 3 in (1.91 m)	214 lb (97 kg)	Mar 14, 2016
Marquez Bembry; ATH	Recruit ratings: Scout: Rivals: 247Sports: ESPN:				
Kivon Bennett; DT	Fort Lauderdale, FL	St. Thomas Aquinas	6 ft 3 in (1.91 m)	265 lb (120 kg)	Jun 20, 2016
Kivon Bennett; DT	Recruit ratings: Scout: Rivals: 247Sports: ESPN:				
James Brown; TE	Orlando, FL	Jones	6 ft 4 in (1.93 m)	210 lb (95 kg)	Oct 30, 2016
James Brown; TE	Recruit ratings: Scout: Rivals: 247Sports: ESPN:				
LaTrell Bumphus; TE	Savannah, TN	Hardin County	6 ft 3.5 in (1.92 m)	232 lb (105 kg)	Jun 18, 2016
LaTrell Bumphus; TE	Recruit ratings: Scout: Rivals: 247Sports: ESPN:				
Matthew Butler; DE	Garner, NC	Garner	6 ft 4 in (1.93 m)	265 lb (120 kg)	Dec 21, 2016
Matthew Butler; DE	Recruit ratings: Scout: Rivals: 247Sports: ESPN:				
K'Rojhn Calbert; OT	McMinnville, TN	Warren County Senior	6 ft 5 in (1.96 m)	285 lb (129 kg)	Nov 16, 2016
K'Rojhn Calbert; OT	Recruit ratings: Scout: Rivals: 247Sports: ESPN:				
Ty Chandler; RB	Nashville, TN	Montgomery Bell Academy	6 ft 0 in (1.83 m)	190 lb (86 kg)	Aug 15, 2016
Ty Chandler; RB	Recruit ratings: Scout: Rivals: 247Sports: ESPN:				
Brent Cimaglia; K	Franklin, TN	Fred J Page	6 ft 0 in (1.83 m)	215 lb (98 kg)	Jun 5, 2016
Brent Cimaglia; K	Recruit ratings: Scout: Rivals: 247Sports: ESPN:				
Trey Coleman; RB	West Monroe, LA	West Monroe	5 ft 11 in (1.80 m)	203 lb (92 kg)	Jun 18, 2016
Trey Coleman; RB	Recruit ratings: Scout: Rivals: 247Sports: ESPN:				
Eric Crosby; DT	Virginia Beach, VA	Ocean Lakes	6 ft 1 in (1.85 m)	297 lb (135 kg)	Apr 22, 2016
Eric Crosby; DT	Recruit ratings: Scout: Rivals: 247Sports: ESPN:				
Princeton Fant; WR	LaVergne, TN	LaVergne	6 ft 2 in (1.88 m)	208 lb (94 kg)	Jun 18, 2016
Princeton Fant; WR	Recruit ratings: Scout: Rivals: 247Sports: ESPN:				
Maleik Gray; S	LaVergne, TN	LaVergne	6 ft 2 in (1.88 m)	205 lb (93 kg)	Jun 12, 2016
Maleik Gray; S	Recruit ratings: Scout: Rivals: 247Sports: ESPN:				
Will Ignont; LB	New Market, AL	Buckhorn	6 ft 2 in (1.88 m)	230 lb (100 kg)	Oct 26, 2016
Will Ignont; LB	Recruit ratings: Scout: Rivals: 247Sports: ESPN:				
Theo Jackson; S	Nashville, TN	Overton	6 ft 2 in (1.88 m)	170 lb (77 kg)	Jun 18, 2016
Theo Jackson; S	Recruit ratings: Scout: Rivals: 247Sports: ESPN:				
Deandre Johnson; DE	Miami, FL	Miami Southridge	6 ft 3 in (1.91 m)	235 lb (107 kg)	Dec 11, 2016
Deandre Johnson; DE	Recruit ratings: Scout: Rivals: 247Sports: ESPN:				
Jacquez Jones; WR	Clearwater, FL	Clearwater	5 ft 11 in (1.80 m)	165 lb (75 kg)	May 20, 2016
Jacquez Jones; WR	Recruit ratings: Scout: Rivals: 247Sports: ESPN:				
Timothy Jordan; RB	Bartow, FL	Bartow	5 ft 11 in (1.80 m)	189 lb (86 kg)	Jan 23, 2017
Timothy Jordan; RB	Recruit ratings: Scout: Rivals: 247Sports: ESPN:				
Cheyenne Labruzza; CB	Albany, LA	Albany	5 ft 11 in (1.80 m)	186 lb (84 kg)	Apr 16, 2016
Cheyenne Labruzza; CB	Recruit ratings: Scout: Rivals: 247Sports: ESPN:				
Riley Locklear; OL	Huntington, WV	Spring Valley	6 ft 5 in (1.96 m)	290 lb (130 kg)	Jul 9, 2016
Riley Locklear; OL	Recruit ratings: Scout: Rivals: 247Sports: ESPN:				
Will McBride; QB	League City, TX	Clear Springs	6 ft 1 in (1.85 m)	200 lb (91 kg)	Dec 12, 2016
Will McBride; QB	Recruit ratings: Scout: Rivals: 247Sports: ESPN:				
Jordan Murphy; WR	Hattiesburg, MS	Hattiesburg	5 ft 11 in (1.80 m)	169 lb (77 kg)	Jul 21, 2016
Jordan Murphy; WR	Recruit ratings: Scout: Rivals: 247Sports: ESPN:				
Solon Page III; OLB	Marietta, GA	Kell	6 ft 1.5 in (1.87 m)	192 lb (87 kg)	Apr 16, 2016
Solon Page III; OLB	Recruit ratings: Scout: Rivals: 247Sports: ESPN:				
Josh Palmer; WR	Fort Lauderdale, FL	St. Thomas Aquinas	6 ft 2 in (1.88 m)	200 lb (91 kg)	Jan 24, 2017
Josh Palmer; WR	Recruit ratings: Scout: Rivals: 247Sports: ESPN:				
Shanon Reid; OLB	Fort Myers, FL	Dunbar	6 ft 1 in (1.85 m)	200 lb (91 kg)	Dec 6, 2016
Shanon Reid; OLB	Recruit ratings: Scout: Rivals: 247Sports: ESPN:				
Shawn Shamburger; S	Moultrie, GA	Colquitt County	6 ft 0 in (1.83 m)	190 lb (86 kg)	Nov 5, 2016
Shawn Shamburger; S	Recruit ratings: Scout: Rivals: 247Sports: ESPN:				
Trey Smith; OT	Jackson, TN	University School of Jackson	6 ft 6 in (1.98 m)	300 lb (140 kg)	Dec 5, 2016
Trey Smith; OT	Recruit ratings: Scout: Rivals: 247Sports: ESPN:				
Ryan Thaxton; DE	Alexandria, VA	St. Stephen's & St. Agnes	6 ft 5 in (1.96 m)	230 lb (100 kg)	Jan 17, 2017
Ryan Thaxton; DE	Recruit ratings: Scout: Rivals: 247Sports: ESPN:				
Overall recruit ranking: Scout: 15 Rivals: 15 247Sports: 17 ESPN: 15
Note: In many cases, Scout, Rivals, 247Sports, On3, and ESPN may conflict in their listings of height and weight.; In these cases, the average was taken. ESPN grades are on a 100-point scale.; Sources: "Tennessee Signee List 2017". Rivals.; "2017 Player Signees – Tennessee". ESPN.; "2017 Team Ranking". Rivals.com.; "2017 Tennessee Volunteers football team". 247Sports.

=== Current depth chart ===
Defense

NB
Rashaan Gaulden
Baylen Buchanan

FS
Micah Abernathy
Theo Jackson

WLB	MLB
Quart'e Sapp	Daniel Bituli
Elliott Berry	Colton Jumper

SS
Nigel Warrior
Evan Berry

CB
Justin Martin
Shawn Shamburger

DE	DT	DT	DE
Jonathan Kongbo	Kendal Vickers	Kahlil McKenzie	Darrell Taylor
Kyle Phillips	Shy Tuttle	Alexis Johnson	Deandre Johnson

CB
Emmanuel Moseley
Shaq Wiggins

Offense

X
Josh Palmer
Brandon Johnson

W
Tyler Byrd
Latrell Williams

LT	LG	C	RG	RT
Drew Richmond	Jack Jones	Jashon Robertson	Trey Smith	Brett Kendrick
Brett Kendrick	⋅	Coleman Thomas	Venzell Boulware	Marcus Tatum

TE
Ethan Wolf
Jakob Johnson

Z
Marquez Callaway
Josh Smith

QB
Quinten Dormady
Jarrett Guarantano

RB
John Kelly
Ty Chandler

Special teams
PK Aaron Medley
P Trevor Daniel
KR Evan Berry
LS Riley Lovingood
H Parker Henry

== Schedule ==
Tennessee announced its 2017 football schedule on September 13, 2016. The 2017 schedule consisted of seven home games, four away, and one neutral site game in the regular season. The Volunteers hosted SEC foes Georgia, South Carolina, LSU, and Vanderbilt, and traveled to Alabama, Florida, Kentucky, and Missouri.

The Volunteers hosted three of its four non–conference games which were against Indiana State from the Missouri Valley Football Conference, UMass, who competes independently, and Southern Miss from Conference USA. They traveled to Atlanta, Georgia, for the Chick-fil-A Kickoff against Georgia Tech from the ACC.

Date	Time	Opponent	Rank	Site	TV	Result	Attendance
September 4	8:00 p.m.	vs. Georgia Tech*	No. 25	Mercedes-Benz Stadium; Atlanta, GA (rivalry/Chick-fil-A Kickoff Game)	ESPN	W 42–41 ^{2OT}	75,107
September 9	4:00 p.m.	Indiana State*	No. 25	Neyland Stadium; Knoxville, TN	SECN	W 42–7	99,015
September 16	3:30 p.m.	at No. 24 Florida	No. 23	Ben Hill Griffin Stadium; Gainesville, FL (rivalry)	CBS	L 20–26	87,736
September 23	Noon	UMass*		Neyland Stadium; Knoxville, TN	SECN	W 17–13	95,324
September 30	3:30 p.m.	No. 7 Georgia		Neyland Stadium; Knoxville, TN (rivalry / SEC Nation / Checker Neyland)	CBS	L 0–41	102,455
October 14	Noon	South Carolina		Neyland Stadium; Knoxville, TN (rivalry)	ESPN	L 9–15	98,104
October 21	2:30 p.m.	at No. 1 Alabama		Bryant–Denny Stadium; Tuscaloosa, AL (Third Saturday in October / SEC Nation)	CBS	L 7–45	101,821
October 28	7:30 p.m.	at Kentucky		Kroger Field; Lexington, KY (rivalry)	SECN	L 26–29	57,543
November 4	7:30 p.m.	Southern Miss*^{†}		Neyland Stadium; Knoxville, TN	SECN	W 24–10	95,551
November 11	7:30 p.m.	at Missouri		Faurot Field; Columbia, MO	SECN	L 17–50	50,637
November 18	7:00 p.m.	No. 21 LSU		Neyland Stadium; Knoxville, TN	ESPN	L 10–30	96,888
November 25	3:00 p.m.	Vanderbilt		Neyland Stadium; Knoxville, TN (rivalry)	SECN	L 24–42	83,117
*Non-conference game; ^{†}Homecoming; Rankings from AP Poll released prior to game; All times are in Eastern time

Schedule source:

== Rankings ==
Ranking movements Legend: ██ Increase in ranking ██ Decrease in ranking — = Not ranked RV = Received votes
	Week															
Poll	Pre	1	2	3	4	5	6	7	8	9	10	11	12	13	14	Final
AP	25	25	23	RV	RV	—	—	—	—	—	—	—	—	—	—	—
Coaches	24	21	23	RV	RV	—	—	—	—	—	—	—	—	—	—	—
CFP	Not released									—	—	—	—	—	—	Not released

== Game summaries ==
=== Georgia Tech ===
Chick-fil-A Kickoff Game

Team	1	2	3	4	OT	2OT	Total
Georgia Tech	7	7	7	7	7	6	41
• No. 25 Tennessee	0	7	7	14	7	7	42

- Location: Atlanta, Georgia
- Game start: 8:00 p.m.
- Elapsed time: 3:42
- Game attendance: 75,107
- Game weather: Indoors
- Referee: John O'Neill • Umpire: Rob. Colosimo • Linesman: William Sutter • Line Judge: P. Engelberts • Back Judge: Mich. Elliott • Field Judge: Gary Powers • Side Judge: Stephen Hassel
- TV announcers (ESPN): Rece Davis (play-by-play), Kirk Herbstreit (color), Maria Taylor (sidelines)

Scoring summary
1	0:06	GT	TaQuon Marshall 1-yard run (Shawn Davis kick)	GT 7–0
2	8:11	TENN	John Kelly 1-yard run (Aaron Medley kick)	Tied 7–7
2	1:11	GT	KirVonte Benson 1-yard run (Davis kick)	GT 14–7
3	9:19	GT	Marshall 1-yard run (Davis kick)	GT 21–7
3	0:42	TENN	Marquez Callaway 10-yard pass from Quinten Dormady (Medley kick)	GT 21–14
4	13:08	GT	Marshall 6-yard run (Davis kick)	GT 28–14
4	11:49	TENN	Callaway 50-yard pass from Dormady (Medley kick)	GT 28–21
4	1:29	TENN	Kelly 11-yard run (Medley kick)	Tied 28–28
OT		GT	Marshall 1-yard run (Davis kick)	GT 35–28
OT		TENN	Kelly 1-yard run (Medley kick)	Tied 35–35
OT2		TENN	Kelly 2-yard run (Medley kick)	TENN 42–35
OT2		GT	Marshall 13-yard run (Conversion failed)	TENN 42–41

In a renewed rivalry with the Georgia Tech Yellow Jackets, the Tennessee Volunteers traveled to Atlanta to play in their second Chick-fil-A Kickoff Game. The Volunteers never had the lead in regulation play but scored two touchdowns in the fourth quarter to tie the game at 28 and force overtime. Each team traded touchdowns through two overtimes with Georgia Tech ultimately seeking to win the game on a two-point conversion. However, quarterback TaQuon Marshall could not complete the pass, and Tennessee secured the 42–41 victory.

In his first start as a Volunteer, quarterback Quinten Dormady went 20-for-37 for 221 passing yards and a pair of touchdowns, both to wide receiver Marquez Callaway. Running back John Kelly ran for 128 rushing yards and four touchdowns. After averaging 47 yards on six punts, five of which pinned the Yellow Jackets inside their 20-yard line, punter Trevor Daniel was named Ray Guy Award Punter of the Week.

Following the game, Tennessee head coach Butch Jones stated, "That was a very good college football game. I have a lot of respect for Georgia Tech. I am really proud of our players. We spoke all week long about a will to win, and that was the kind of game to find out our will to win. We knew that this was going to be a game that you had to show some resolve and some grit, and you had to play complementary football." He added, "The resolve and resiliency of our defense, even though we gave up [535] yards rushing, we still managed to force two takeaways, and offensively, we didn't turn the football over, which was paramount to winning the football game."

=== Indiana State ===
Team	1	2	3	4	Total
Indiana State	0	0	7	0	7
• #25 Tennessee	14	14	7	7	42

- Location: Knoxville, Tennessee
- Game start: 4:01 p.m.
- Elapsed time: 3:19
- Game attendance: 99,015
- Game weather: Temperature: 79 °F (26 °C) • Wind: 11 mph (18 km/h) • Weather: Sunny
- Referee: Hubert Owens • Umpire: Walt Hill • Linesman: Steve Green • Line judge: Darren Crawford • Back judge: Martin Hankins • Field judge: Greg Thomas • Side judge: Chad Hill
- TV announcers (SECN): David Neal (play-by-play), Matt Stinchcomb (color), Dawn Davenport (sidelines)

Scoring summary
1	14:46	TENN	Ty Chandler 91-yard kickoff return (Aaron Medley kick)	TENN 7–0
1	2:49	TENN	Carlin Fils-Aime 4-yard run (Medley kick)	TENN 14–0
2	9:03	TENN	Fils-Aime 30-yard run (Medley kick)	TENN 21–0
2	0:53	TENN	Brandon Johnson 19-yard pass from Quinten Dormady (Medley kick)	TENN 28–0
3	10:07	INS	Jacquet McClendon 23-yard pass from Cade Sparks (Jerry Nunez kick)	TENN 28–7
3	2:12	TENN	Marquez Callaway 37-yard pass from Dormady (Medley kick)	TENN 35–7
4	0:56	TENN	Jeff George 11-yard pass from Jarrett Guarantano (Medley kick)	TENN 42–7

In their home opener, the #25 Tennessee Volunteers hosted the Indiana State Sycamores in the teams' first-ever meeting. From the opening kickoff, which Tennessee freshman running back Ty Chandler returned 91 yards for a touchdown, the Volunteers scored 28 unanswered points. Indiana State's only touchdown came early in the third quarter. Tennessee scored twice more to win their home-opener, 42–7. Following the game, Chandler was named SEC Freshman of the Week.

Tennessee head coach Butch Jones called the outcome "a good win." He added, "With the short turnaround, I thought [our players] did a very good job all week long of trying to prepare their bodies and their minds, so I'm really proud of them. I thought one of the keys to the game was third-down defense and being able to get off the field."

=== Florida ===
Team	1	2	3	4	Total
#23 Tennessee	0	3	0	17	20
• #24 Florida	3	3	0	20	26

- Location: Gainesville, Florida
- Game start: 3:30 p.m.
- Elapsed time: 3:30
- Game attendance: 87,736
- Game weather: Temperature: 85 °F (29 °C) • Wind: 6 mph (9.7 km/h) • Weather: Partly cloudy
- Referee: John McDaid • Umpire: Tom Quick • Linesman: Gary Jayrow • Line judge: Chad Lorance • Back judge: Grantis Bell • Field judge: P. Davenport • Side judge: Chris Conley
- TV announcers (CBS): Brad Nessler (play-by-play), Gary Danielson (color), Allie LaForce (sidelines).

Scoring summary
1	7:39	UF	Eddy Piñeiro 27-yard field goal	UF 3–0
2	8:11	UF	Piñeiro 41-yard field goal	UF 6–0
2	2:58	UT	Brent Cimaglia 51-yard field goal	UF 6–3
4	14:23	UF	CJ Henderson 16-yard interception (Piñeiro kick)	UF 13–3
4	8:36	UT	John Kelly 34-yard run (Aaron Medley kick)	UF 13–10
4	5:13	UF	Brandon Powell 5-yard pass from Feleipe Franks (Piñeiro kick)	UF 20–10
4	4:43	UT	Ethan Wolf 28-yard pass from Quentin Dormady (Medley kick)	UF 20–17
4	0:50	UT	Medley 27-yard field goal	Tied
4	0:00	UF	Tyrie Cleveland 63-yard pass from Franks	UF 26–20

In a defensive battle throughout much of the game, the #23 Tennessee Volunteers faced their rivals, the #24 Florida Gators in Gainesville. Down by 10 points in the fourth quarter, Tennessee recovered to allow kicker Aaron Medley to tie the game at 20, after getting stalled in Florida territory with less than a minute to play. As time expired, Florida quarterback Feleipe Franks threw a 63-yard pass to open wide receiver Tyrie Cleveland for a touchdown, sealing a 26–20 victory.

=== UMass ===
Team	1	2	3	4	Total
UMass	0	6	7	0	13
• Tennessee	0	14	3	0	17

- Location: Knoxville, Tennessee
- Game start: Noon
- Elapsed time: 3:21
- Game attendance: 95,324
- Game weather: Temperature: 80 °F (27 °C) • Wind: 2 mph (3.2 km/h) • Weather: Sunny
- Referee: Matt Loeffler • Umpire: Stan Weihe • Linesman: Gus Morris III • Line judge: Michael Shirey • Back judge: Kevin Mitchell • Field judge: Bobby Ables • Side judge: Jesse Dupuy
- TV announcers (SECN): Taylor Zarzour (play-by-play), Andre Ware (color), Olivia Harlan (sidelines)

Scoring summary
2	4:33	UT	John Kelly 12-yard run (Aaron Medley kick)	UT 7–0
2	2:57	UMASS	Ross Comis 5-yard run (Michael Schreiner kick failed)	UT 7–6
2	0:25	UT	Tyler Byrd 8-yard pass from Quentin Dormady (Medley kick)	UT 14–6
3	7:52	UT	Medley 40-yard field goal	UT 17–6
3	2:51	UMASS	Sadiq Palmer 13-yard pass from Andrew Ford (Logan Laurent kick)	UT 17–13

Tennessee and UMass played each other for their first meeting in the 2017 season. Tennessee survived an upset attempt by the winless Minutemen in Neyland Stadium. After a scoreless first quarter, Tennessee was able to breakthrough on a John Kelly 12-yard rushing touchdown. UMass scored later in the quarter but missed the extra point to make the score 7–6. Tennessee scored late in the first half on a Tyler Byrd reception from Quinten Dormady to make the halftime score 14–6. Tennessee distanced themselves with a 40-yard field goal by Aaron Medley midway through the third quarter. UMass pulled within one score on a Sadiq Palmer reception from quarterback Andrew Ford late in the third quarter. Both teams were scoreless in the fourth giving Tennessee the victory.

=== Georgia ===
Team	1	2	3	4	Total
• #7 Georgia	10	14	7	10	41
Tennessee	0	0	0	0	0

- Location: Knoxville, Tennessee
- Game start: 3:30 p.m.
- Elapsed time: 3:12
- Game attendance: 102,455
- Game weather: Temperature: 77 °F (25 °C) • Wind: 11 mph (18 km/h) • Weather: Partly sunny
- Referee: Hubert Owens • Umpire: Walt Hill • Linesman: Chad Green • Line judge: Chuck Rice • Back judge: Martin Hankins • Field judge: Greg Thomas • Side judge: Chad Hill
- TV announcers (CBS): Brad Nessler (play-by-play), Gary Danielson (color), Allie LaForce (sidelines).

Scoring summary
1	13:37	UGA	Rodrigo Blankenship 38 yard field goal	UGA 3–0
1	6:10	UGA	Javon Wims 12-yard pass from Jake Fromm (Blankenship kick)	UGA 10–0
2	7:13	UGA	Fromm 9-yard run (Blankenship kick)	UGA 17–0
2	4:14	UGA	Fromm 4-yard run (Blankenship kick)	UGA 24–0
3	1:04	UGA	Sony Michel 21-yard run (Blankenship kick))	UGA 31–0
4	12:00	UGA	Brian Herrien 1-yard run (Blankenship kick)	UGA 38–0
4	5:34	UGA	David Marvin 19-yard field goal	UGA 41–0

Tennessee suffered their worst lost at Neyland Stadium in school history against the Bulldogs. In a game Georgia dominated from start to finish, Tennessee only was able to put up 142 total yards, with 91 scrimmage yards coming from running back John Kelly.

=== South Carolina ===
Team	1	2	3	4	Total
• South Carolina	0	3	6	6	15
Tennessee	6	3	0	0	9

- Location: Knoxville, Tennessee
- Game start: 12:02 pm
- Elapsed time: 3:09
- Game attendance: 98,104
- Game weather: Temperature: 77 °F (25 °C) • Wind: 5 mph (8.0 km/h) • Weather: Partly sunny
- Referee: Steve Marlowe • Umpire: Rick Lowe • Linesman: Keith Johnson • Line judge: Kirk Lewis • Back judge: Michael Watson • Field judge: Allan Nicholson • Side judge: Mike Williams
- TV announcers (ESPN): Mark Neely (play-by-play), Tommy Tuberville (color), Paul Carcaterra (sidelines)

Scoring summary
1	10:26	TENN	Brent Cimaglia 29 yard field goal	3–0 TENN
1	1:36	TENN	Brent Cimaglia 33 yard field goal	6–0 TENN
2	10:31	SCAR	Parker White 47 yard field goal	6–3 TENN
2	0:33	TENN	Brent Cimaglia 24 yard field goal	9–3 TENN
3	1:02	SCAR	A.J. Turner 20 yard run	9–9
4	5:17	SCAR	Parker White 21 yard field goal	12–9 SCAR
4	1:13	SCAR	Parker White 36 yard field goal	15–9 SCAR

In a sluggish game for both offenses, South Carolina overcame a 9–3 halftime deficit to defeat Tennessee 15–9.

=== Alabama ===
Third Saturday in October

Team	1	2	3	4	Total
Tennessee	0	0	7	0	7
• #1 Alabama	7	14	10	14	45

- Location: Tuscaloosa, Alabama
- Game start: 2:39 p.m.
- Elapsed time: 3:22
- Game attendance: 101,821
- Game weather: Temperature: 81 °F (27 °C) • Wind: 11 mph (18 km/h) • Weather: Mostly sunny
- Referee: Marc Curles • Umpire: Tom Quick • Linesman: Tim Sistrunk • Line judge: Michael Taylor • Back judge: Martin Hankins • Field judge: Wes Booker • Side judge: Chris Jamison
- TV announcers (CBS): Brad Nessler (play-by-play), Gary Danielson (color), Allie LaForce (sidelines)

Scoring summary
1	8:21	BAMA	Bo Scarbrough 1 yard run (Andy Pappanastos kick)	7–0 BAMA
2	4:48	BAMA	Bo Scarbrough 1 yard run (Andy Pappanastos kick)	14–0 BAMA
2	1:18	BAMA	Damien Harris 11 yard run (Andy Pappanastos kick)	21–0 BAMA
3	12:39	BAMA	Irv Smith Jr 14 yard pass from Jalen Hurts (Andy Pappanastos kick)	28–0 BAMA
3	6:03	TENN	Daniel Bituli 97 yard interception return (Brent Cimaglia kick)	28–7 BAMA
3	3:13	BAMA	Andy Pappanastos 25 yard field goal	31–7 BAMA
4	12:59	BAMA	Tua Tagovailoa 23 yard run (Andy Pappanastos kick)	38–7 BAMA
4	4:49	BAMA	Henry Ruggs III 60 yard pass from Tua Tagovailoa (Andy Pappanastos kick)	45–7 BAMA

For the 11th straight time, the Crimson Tide defeated the Volunteers in their annual rivalry game. Tennessee's lone score came on a 97-yard pick-six from Daniel Bituli off of Tua Tagovailoa in the third quarter.

=== Kentucky ===
Team	1	2	3	4	Total
Tennessee	6	14	3	3	26
• Kentucky	7	14	0	8	29

- Location: Lexington, Kentucky
- Game start: 7:39 p.m.
- Elapsed time: 3:27
- Game attendance: 57,543
- Game weather: Temperature: 38 °F (3 °C) • Wind: 5 mph (8.0 km/h) • Weather: Cloudy
- Referee: David Smith • Umpire: Wally Hough • Linesman: Jay Vines • Line judge: March Bovos • Back judge: Wayne Gautney • Field judge: Andy Britton • Side judge: Richard Rooker
- TV announcers (SECN): Tom Hart (play-by-play), Jordan Rodgers (color), Cole Cubelic (sidelines)

Scoring summary
1	13:26	TENN	Brent Cimaglia 30 yard field goal	3–0 TENN
1	10:16	UK	Benjamin Snell Jr. 6 yard run (Austin MacGinnis kick)	7–3 UK
1	4:34	TENN	Brent Cimaglia 24 yard field goal	7–6 UK
2	14:57	UK	Benjamin Snell Jr. 2 yard run (Austin Macginnis kick)	14–6 UK
2	8:37	TENN	Ty Chandler 1 yard run (Brent Cimaglia kick)	14–13 UK
2	5:58	UK	Benjamin Snell Jr. 1 yard run (Austin Macginnis kick)	21–13 UK
2	1:25	TENN	Ty Chandler 1 yard run (Brent Cimaglia kick)	21–20 UK
3	3:40	TENN	Brent Cimaglia 30 yard field goal	21–23 TENN
4	13:24	TENN	Brent Cimaglia 45 yard field goal	21–26 TENN
4	0:33	UK	Stephen Johnson 11 yard run (Benjamin Snell Jr. 2-point pass)	29–26 UK

For only the second time in the last 33 meetings, and despite having a turnover margin of 4–0, the Kentucky Wildcats defeated the Tennessee Volunteers by a score of 29–26. The victory marked only Kentucky's third over the Volunteers since 1984.

=== Southern Miss ===
Team	1	2	3	4	Total
Southern Miss	0	3	0	7	10
• Tennessee	7	3	14	0	24

- Location: Knoxville, Tennessee
- Game start: 7:39 p.m.
- Elapsed time: 3:25
- Game attendance: 95,551
- Game weather: Temperature: 68 °F (20 °C) • Wind: 2 mph (3.2 km/h) • Weather: Partly cloudy
- Referee: Matt Austin • Umpire: Rodney Lawary • Linesman: Tim Sistrunk • Line judge: Michael Taylor • Back judge: Jimmy Russell • Field judge: Blake Parks • Side judge: Bobby Moreau
- TV announcers (SECN): Tom Hart (play-by-play), Jordan Rodgers (color), Cole Cubelic (sidelines)

Scoring summary
1	10:59	TENN	Jarrett Guarantano 3 yard run (Aaron Medley kick)	7–0 TENN
2	8:16	USM	Parker Shaunfield 27 yard field goal	7–3 TENN
2	2:42	TENN	Aaron Medley 38 yard field goal	10–3 TENN
3	5:15	TENN	John Kelly 20 yard run (Aaron Medley kick)	17–3 TENN
3	3:17	TENN	John Kelly 3 yard run (Aaron Medley kick)	24–3 TENN
4	6:45	USM	Kwadra Griggs 1 yard run (Parker Shaunfield kick)	24–10 TENN

The Volunteers snapped a four-game losing streak in the 24–10 victory over Southern Miss. Running back John Kelly recorded two touchdowns and quarterback Jarrett Guarantano had one rushing touchdown.

=== Missouri ===
Team	1	2	3	4	Total
Tennessee	10	7	0	0	17
• Missouri	14	10	7	19	50

- Location: Columbia, Missouri
- Game start: 7:30 p.m.
- Elapsed time: 3:36
- Game attendance: 50,637
- Game weather: Temperature: 45 °F (7 °C) • Wind: 15 mph (24 km/h) • Weather: Clear
- Referee: Marc Curles • Umpire: Brent Sowell • Linesman: Keith Johnson • Line judge: Chris Conway • Back judge: Scott Vaughn • Field judge: Wes Booker • Side judge: Chris Jamison
- TV announcers (SECN): Tom Hart (play-by-play), Jordan Rodgers (color), Cole Cubelic (sidelines)

Scoring summary
1	9:15	MIZZ	Ish Witter 7 yard run (Tucker McCann kick)	7–0 MIZZ
1	7:19	TENN	Nigel Warrior 70 yard interception return (Aaron Medley kick)	7–7
1	4:52	MIZZ	Emanuel Hall 31 yard pass from Drew Lock (Tucker McCann kick)	14–7 MIZZ
1	1:17	TENN	Aaron Medley 48 yard field goal	14–10 MIZZ
2	7:25	MIZZ	Tucker McCann 41 yard field goal	17–10 MIZZ
2	1:15	TENN	Ethan Wolf 19 yard pass from Will McBride (Aaron Medley kick)	17–17
2	0:18	MIZZ	Larry Rountree III 1 yard run (Tucker McCann kick)	24–17 MIZZ
3	10:56	MIZZ	Emanuel Hall 50 yard pass from Drew Lock (Tucker McCann kick)	31–17 MIZZ
3	4:34	MIZZ	J'Mon Moore 23 yard pass from Drew Lock (Tucker McCann kick)	38–17 MIZZ
3	2:48	MIZZ	Tucker McCann 23 yard field goal	41–17 MIZZ
4	14:32	MIZZ	Tucker McCann 38 yard field goal	44–17 MIZZ
4	13:21	MIZZ	Johnathon Johnson 20 yard pass from Drew Lock (kick failed)	50–17 MIZZ

Tennessee was forced to start Will McBride at quarterback due to injury. The Volunteers suffered a 50–17 loss to Missouri, which left Tennessee at a 4–6 record for the season and 0–6 in conference. The Vols' loss to the Tigers was their worst loss to an unranked opponent in the AP Poll era. Head coach Butch Jones was fired following the game.

=== LSU ===
Team	1	2	3	4	Total
• #21 LSU	3	14	13	0	30
Tennessee	0	10	0	0	10

- Location: Knoxville, Tennessee
- Game start: 7:10 p.m.
- Elapsed time: 3:10
- Game attendance: 96,888
- Game weather: Temperature: 66 °F (19 °C) • Wind: 18 mph (29 km/h) • Weather: Cloudy
- Referee: Matt Loeffler • Umpire: Stan Weihe • Linesman: Gus Morris • Line judge: Michael Shirey • Back judge: Tony Josselyn • Field judge: Mike Boshers • Side judge: Chad Hill
- TV announcers (ESPN): Bob Wischusen (play-by-play), Brock Huard (color), Allison Williams (sidelines)

Scoring summary
1	6:38	LSU	Connor Culp 30 yard field goal	3–0 LSU
2	13:59	TENN	Aaron Medley 45 yard field goal	3–3
2	11:31	LSU	Darrel Williams 10 yard run (Connor Culp kick)	10–3 LSU
2	2:08	LSU	Danny Etling 13 yard run (Connor Culp kick)	17–3 LSU
2	1:23	TENN	Marquez Callaway 46 yard pass from Jarrett Guarantano (Aaron Medley kick)	17–10 LSU
3	7:26	LSU	Derrius Guice 3 yard run (kick failed)	23–10 LSU
3	2:06	LSU	Darrel Williams 6 yard run (Connor Culp kick)	30–10 LSU

Under interim head coach Brady Hoke, Tennessee was able to go the half trailing with a 17–10 score. LSU pulled away with 13 points in the third quarter in a game that featured a rain storm. Despite the result, Tennessee outgained LSU in total yards 293–281.

=== Vanderbilt ===
Team	1	2	3	4	Total
• Vanderbilt	7	14	0	21	42
Tennessee	14	3	0	7	24

- Location: Knoxville, Tennessee
- Game start: 4:01 p.m.
- Elapsed time: 3:21
- Game attendance: 83,117
- Game weather: Temperature: 63 °F (17 °C) • Wind: 4 mph (6.4 km/h) • Weather: Sunny
- Referee: James Carter • Umpire: Russ Pulley • Line judge: Chuck Rice • Back judge: Dax Hill • Field judge: J. Taylor • Side judge: A. Jeffries
- TV announcers (SECN): Dave Neal (play-by-play), Matt Stinchcomb (color), Dawn Davenport (sidelines)

Scoring summary
1	10:06	TENN	Marquez Callaway 2 yard pass from Jarrett Guarantano (Aaron Medley kick)	7–0 TENN
1	6:13	VAN	C.J. Duncan 9 yard pass from Kyle Shurmur (Tommy Openshaw kick)	7–7
1	2:50	TENN	John Kelly 1 yard run (Aaron Medley kick)	14–7 TENN
2	11:47	VAN	Ralph Webb 2 yard run (Tommy Openshaw kick)	14–14
2	2:37	VAN	Kalija Lipscomb 30 yard pass from Kyle Shurmur (Tommy Openshaw kick)	21–14 VAN
3	5:22	TENN	Aaron Medley 49 yard field goal	21–17 VAN
4	14:20	VAN	Trent Sherfield 20 yard pass from Kyle Shurmur (Tommy Openshaw kick)	28–17 VAN
4	6:58	VAN	Trent Sherfield 12 yard pass from Kyle Shurmur (Tommy Openshaw kick)	35–17 VAN
4	5:59	VAN	Ralph Webb 20 yard run (Tommy Openshaw kick)	42–17 VAN
4	4:27	TENN	Ethan Wolf 20 yard pass from Jarrett Guarantano (Aaron Medley kick)	42–24 VAN

In a game that saw Tennessee lose eight games and go winless in conference play for the first time in school history, Vanderbilt dominated in total yardage 529–238. Tennessee stayed in the game through three quarters, only trailing 21–17. However, Vanderbilt scored three touchdowns in the fourth quarter to pull away. The victory marked Vanderbilt's fourth in six games over the Volunteers, a mark that had not been seen in the rivalry since 1922–1929.

== Team players drafted into the NFL ==
Tennessee had three players selected in the 2018 NFL Draft.

Player	Position	Round	Pick	NFL club
Rashaan Gaulden	Safety	3	85	Carolina Panthers
John Kelly	Running back	6	176	Los Angeles Rams
Kahlil McKenzie	Defensive tackle/offensive guard	6	198	Kansas City Chiefs
