= Casey Clausen =

American football player and coach (born 1981)

Westlake High School (CA)
- Title: Associate head coach

Personal information
- Born: January 9, 1981 (age 45); Thousand Oaks, California, U.S.
- Listed height: 6 ft 3 in (1.91 m)
- Listed weight: 210 lb (95 kg)

Career information
- Position: Quarterback (No. 7)
- High school: Bishop Alemany (Mission Hills, California)
- College: Tennessee
- NFL draft: 2004: undrafted

Career history

Playing
- Kansas City Chiefs (2004)*; Amsterdam Admirals (2005)
- * Offseason or practice squad member only

Coaching
- Oaks Christian School (CA) (2006–2013) Offensive coordinator; Calabasas HS (CA) (2014–2017) Head coach; Bishop Alemany HS (CA) (2018–2024) Head coach; Westlake HS (CA) (2025–Present) Associate Head Coach

Awards and highlights
- Freshman All-SEC (2000); Freshman All-American (The Sporting News) (2000); Florida Citrus Bowl MVP (2002); World Bowl champion (2005)

Casey James Clausen (born January 9, 1981) is an American football coach and former player. He was previously the head football coach of Bishop Alemany High School and Calabasas High School. Clausen played college football at the University of Tennessee and professionally in NFL Europe (NFLE). He attended Bishop Alemany.

Clausen is the older brother of former quarterbacks Jimmy Clausen and Rick Clausen.

== College career ==
Clausen attended and played college football at the University of Tennessee under head coach Phillip Fulmer from 2000 to 2003 with the nickname "Iceman."

=== 2000 season ===
Clausen made his collegiate debut in the third game of Tennessee's 2000 season. In the 70–3 win over Louisiana-Monroe, he had 133 passing yards and three touchdowns. He took over the starting position from A. J. Suggs on October 21, 2000, in the annual rivalry game against Alabama. He helped lead Tennessee to a 20–10 victory. On November 11, against Arkansas, he passed for 191 yards and five touchdowns in a 63–20 win. He became the fourth quarterback in school history to pass for five touchdowns in a game. In the following game against Kentucky, he was 19-of-24 for 362 yards, four touchdown, and one interception in the 59–20 win. He passed for 1,593 yards, 16 touchdowns, and nine interceptions as the Vols finished 8–4 with a Cotton Bowl loss to Kansas State.

=== 2001 season ===
Clausen helped lead Tennessee to a 3–0 start before a 26–24 loss to Georgia. The Volunteers went on a seven-game winning streak. In the streak, he had a game against Memphis where he passed for five touchdowns and a game against Kentucky with four touchdowns. He helped lead Tennessee to the SEC East Division title in 2001. In the SEC Championship, he passed for 332 yards and two touchdowns in a 31–20 loss to LSU. He passed for 2,969 yards, 22 touchdowns, and nine interceptions to go with three rushing touchdowns in the 2001 season. Tennessee defeated Michigan in the Citrus Bowl 45–17 to finish 11–2 and earn a final AP Poll ranking of #4. He was 26 of 34 for a career-high 393 yards and had two touchdown passes in the win.

=== 2002 season ===
On October 5, 2002, Clausen passed for 291 yards, two touchdowns, and one interception in 41–38 6OT victory over Arkansas. In the 2002 season, he passed for 2,297 yards, 11 touchdowns, and seven interceptions to go with a rushing touchdown as the Vols went 8–5 with a Peach Bowl loss to Maryland.

=== 2003 season ===
Clausen helped lead Tennessee to a 4–0 start and a #7 ranking before the team dropped two games to Auburn and Georgia. On October 25, 2003, against Alabama, Clausen had 283 yards and four touchdowns in a 51–43 5OT win. The Alabama win was the beginning of a six-game winning streak to close out the season. On November 15, he passed for 342 yards and five touchdowns against Mississippi State in a 59–21 win. In his final game at Tennessee, he passed for 384 yards and two touchdonws in a Peach Bowl loss to Clemson. In the 2003 season, he passed for 2,968 yards, 27 touchdowns, and nine interceptions to go with two rushing touchdowns as the Vols went 10–3.

He started 44 of 47 games at the quarterback position in his career and had a 14–1 record on the road with a 34–10 record overall.

=== College statistics ===
Tennessee Volunteers
Season	Passing							Rushing			
Season	Comp	Att	Yards	Pct.	TD	Int	QB rating	Att	Yards	Avg	TD
2000	121	194	1,473	62.4	15	6	145.5	40	−42	−1.1	0
2001	227	354	2,969	64.1	22	9	150.0	64	−36	−0.6	3
2002	194	310	2,297	62.6	11	7	132.0	61	−7	−0.1	1
2003	233	412	2,968	56.6	27	9	134.3	64	−45	−0.7	2
Totals	775	1,270	9,707	61.0	75	31	139.8	229	-130	-0.6	6

== Professional career ==
Pre-draft measurables
Height	Weight	Arm length	Hand span
6 ft 3 1/2 in (1.92 m)	223 lb (101 kg)	32 5/8 in (0.83 m)	9 1/4 in (0.23 m)
All values from NFL Combine

Clausen went undrafted in the 2004 NFL draft and was briefly signed by the Kansas City Chiefs as a free agent.

In 2005, Clausen spent some time with the Amsterdam Admirals of NFL Europe.

== Coaching career ==
Clausen was hired as the Calabasas High School's head football coach on December 12, 2013. On December 16, 2017, Clausen was hired as head football coach at his alma mater, Bishop Alemany High School. In 2025, he became associate head coach for Westlake High School.

== Personal life ==
Clausen is the older brother of former quarterbacks Jimmy Clausen and Rick Clausen.
