= Marcus Nash (American football) =

American football player (born 1976)

No. 82, 11
- Position: Wide receiver

Personal information
- Born: February 1, 1976 (age 50); Tulsa, Oklahoma, U.S.
- Listed height: 6 ft 3 in (1.91 m)
- Listed weight: 195 lb (88 kg)

Career information
- High school: Edmond (Edmond, Oklahoma)
- College: Tennessee
- NFL draft: 1998: 1st round, 30th overall pick

Career history
- Denver Broncos (1998–1999); Miami Dolphins (1999); Baltimore Ravens (1999–2000); Detroit Fury (2003); Las Vegas Gladiators (2004–2006); Dallas Desperados (2007–2008)

Awards and highlights
- 2× Super Bowl champion (XXXIII, XXXV); AFL Offensive Player of the Year (2004); First-team All-Arena (2004); First-team All-SEC (1997)

Career NFL statistics
- Receptions: 4
- Receiving yards: 76
- Stats at Pro Football Reference

Career AFL statistics
- Receptions: 661
- Receiving yards: 8,113
- Receiving touchdowns: 192
- Stats at ArenaFan.com

Marcus DeLando Nash (born February 1, 1976) is an American former professional football player who was a wide receiver in the National Football League (NFL). He was selected by the Denver Broncos 30th overall in the 1998 NFL draft. He played college football for the Tennessee Volunteers.

Nash also played in the NFL for the Miami Dolphins and Baltimore Ravens, as well as in the Arena Football League (AFL) for the Detroit Fury, Las Vegas Gladiators and Dallas Desperados.

== College career ==
Nash played college football at the University of Tennessee. He contributed on the field from 1995 to 1997. In the 1997 season, he had 76 receptions for 1,170 yards and 13 touchdowns. He led the SEC in receptions, touchdowns, and yards that year.

== Professional career ==
Pre-draft measurables
Height	Weight	Arm length	Hand span
6 ft 2 7/8 in (1.90 m)	193 lb (88 kg)	33 1/4 in (0.84 m)	10 1/8 in (0.26 m)

=== Denver Broncos ===
Nash was selected by the Broncos in the first round (30th overall) of the 1998 NFL draft. During his rookie season, he appeared in eight games and caught four passes for 76 yards. He was part of the team that won Super Bowl XXXIII against the Atlanta Falcons. In 1999, Nash appeared in two games for the Broncos including one start, but recorded no statistics.

=== Miami Dolphins ===
On September 21, 1999, Nash was traded to the Miami Dolphins in exchange for running back John Avery - another 1998 first-rounder. However, he was waived by the team just one week later.

=== Baltimore Ravens ===
Just over a month after his release from the Dolphins, Nash was signed by the Baltimore Ravens on October 25. He appeared in one game but did not catch any passes. He was on the 2000 Ravens team that won Super Bowl XXXV over the New York Giants.

=== Detroit Fury ===
In 2003, Nash made the transition to the Arena Football League with the Detroit Fury. During his rookie season, he led the team in all receiving categories with 69 receptions for 866 yards and 24 touchdowns. On defense, he recorded 11 tackles, a fumble recovery, an interception and five pass breakups. He also returned two kickoffs for 19 yards. On February 14 against the Carolina Cobras, Nash earned team MVP honors with eight receptions for 86 yards and three touchdowns.

=== Las Vegas Gladiators ===
Nash signed with the Las Vegas Gladiators in 2004 and subsequently experienced his most productive season as a professional. He set an AFL record with 154 receptions and racked up 1,771 yards and 46 touchdowns. He also rushed 12 times for 21 yards and three touchdowns. For his performance, Nash was named the AFL's Offensive Player of the Year. On defense he recorded five tackles.

Nash continued to produce for the Gladiators in 2005 as he caught 129 passes for a career-high 1,787 yards and 41 touchdowns. He was named AFL Offensive Player of the Month in May after catching 36 passes for 415 yards and 13 touchdowns. Nash also carried the ball four times for four yards and scored two touchdowns on the ground. He recorded one tackle and returned three kickoffs for 10 yards.

In his final season with the Gladiators in 2006, Nash caught 122 passes for 1,281 yards and 28 touchdowns. He also rushed four times for five yards, recorded two tackles and returned two kickoffs for five yards.

=== Dallas Desperados ===
After three seasons with the Gladiators, Nash joined the Dallas Desperados in 2007. He caught 78 passes for 1,090 yards and 20 touchdowns. In a game against the Kansas City Brigade, he surpassed career milestones of 500 receptions and 6,000 receiving yards. Additionally in 2007, Nash rushed four times for five yards and three touchdowns.

In 2008, he caught over 100 passes for the fourth time in his career as he made 109 receptions for 1,318 yards and 33 touchdowns. He also rushed six times for seven yards on the season. In the team's playoff loss to the New York Dragons on June 28, Nash suffered a career-ending neck injury.
