= Vickers (surname) =

Vickers is a surname. Notable people with the surname include:

- Alfred Gomersal Vickers (1810–1837), British marine-painter
- Andrew Vickers (born 1967), British biostatistician
- Brad Vickers, a fictional character in the video game series Resident Evil.
- Brian Vickers (born 1983), American stock car driver, formerly competed in the NASCAR Cup Series
- Brian Vickers (literary scholar) (born 1937), British authority on rhetoric
- Charles Vickers (disambiguation), multiple people
- David Vickers, a fictional character on the soap opera One Life to Live
- Debbie Vickers (born 1953), American television producer for NBC's The Tonight Show with Jay Leno
- Diana Vickers (born 1991), English singer
- Doris Vickers (born 1980), Austrian archaeoastronomer
- Douglas Vickers (1861–1937), English industrialist and politician
- Edward Vickers (1804–1897), British steel maker and industrialist
- F. B. Vickers (1903–1985), Australian author
- Geoffrey Vickers (1894–1982), pioneer of systems thinking
- George Vickers (1801–1879), United States Senator from Maryland
- Harry Vickers (disambiguation), multiple people
- Henry Vickers (1807–1882), English politician
- Jack Vickers (1908–1980), English footballer
- Janeene Vickers (born 1968), American athlete
- John Vickers (disambiguation), multiple people
- Jon Vickers (disambiguation), multiple people
- Joan Vickers, Baroness Vickers (1907–1994), British National Liberal and Conservative Party politician
- Kendal Vickers (born 1996), American football player
- Kevin Vickers (born 1956), Canadian ambassador to Ireland, former Canadian Parliament House of Commons Sergeant-at-Arms
- Kipp Vickers (born 1969), American football player
- Larry Vickers (soldier) (born 1963), American soldier and author
- Lawrence Vickers (born 1983), American football player
- Lee Vickers (born 1981), American football player
- Liam Vickers (born 1995), American storyboard artist and creator of webseries Murder Drones
- Matt Vickers (born 1983), British politician
- Martha Vickers (1925–1971), American television and film actress
- Michael Vickers (disambiguation), multiple people
- Patricia Vickers-Rich (born 1944), Australian palaeontologist
- Paxson Vickers (died 1865), American politician and manufacturer from Pennsylvania
- Roy Henry Vickers (born 1946), Canadian painter
- Rube Vickers (1878–1958), Canadian baseball pitcher
- Salley Vickers (born 1948), English novelist
- Sara Vickers (born 1985), Scottish actress
- Squire J. Vickers (1872–1947), American architect
- Stanley Vickers (disambiguation), multiple people
- Steve Vickers (disambiguation), multiple people
- Tom Vickers (1936–2026), American politician from Nebraska
- William Edward Vickers (1889–1965), English mystery writer better known under his main pen name Roy Vickers
- Yvette Vickers (1928–2010), American actress, pin-up model and singer

== Fictional ==
- Deangelo Vickers, a fictional character on the U.S. television sitcom The Office

== See also ==
- Van Vicker (born 1977) Joseph van Vicker; Liberian-Ghanaian actor
- McVicker (surname)
