= 2016 Tennessee Volunteers football team =

American college football season

2016 Tennessee Volunteers football

Music City Bowl champion

Music City Bowl, W 38–24 vs. Nebraska
- Conference: Southeastern Conference
- Eastern Division

Ranking
- Coaches: No. 24
- AP: No. 22
- Record: 9–4 (4–4 SEC)
- Head coach: Butch Jones (4th season)
- Offensive coordinator: Mike DeBord (2nd season)
- Offensive scheme: Multiple
- Defensive coordinator: Bob Shoop (1st season)
- Base defense: 4–3
- Home stadium: Neyland Stadium

2016 Southeastern Conference football standings
	Conf.			Overall
Team	W		L	W		L
Eastern Division
No. 14 Florida x	6	–	2	9	–	4
No. 22 Tennessee	4	–	4	9	–	4
Georgia	4	–	4	8	–	5
Kentucky	4	–	4	7	–	6
South Carolina	3	–	5	6	–	7
Vanderbilt	3	–	5	6	–	7
Missouri*	2	–	6	4	–	8
Western Division
No. 2 Alabama x$^	8	–	0	14	–	1
No. 24 Auburn	5	–	3	8	–	5
No. 13 LSU	5	–	3	8	–	4
Texas A&M	4	–	4	8	–	5
Arkansas	3	–	5	7	–	6
Mississippi State	3	–	5	6	–	7
Ole Miss*	2	–	6	5	–	7
Championship: Alabama 54, Florida 16
^ – College Football Playoff participant; $ – Conference champion; x – Division champion/co-champions; * Ole Miss and Missouri vacated all wins due to NCAA violations.; Rankings from AP Poll

The 2016 Tennessee Volunteers football team represented the University of Tennessee in the 2016 NCAA Division I FBS football season. This was the program's 120th overall season, 83rd as a member of the Southeastern Conference (SEC), and 25th within the SEC Eastern Division. The Volunteers played their home games at Neyland Stadium in Knoxville, Tennessee and were led by fourth-year head coach Butch Jones. They finished the season 9–4, 4–4 in SEC play to finish in a three-way tie for second place in the Eastern Division. They were invited to the Music City Bowl where they defeated Nebraska 38–24.

== Offseason ==
=== Departures ===
Departures of scholarship players from the 2015 team.

Name	Number	Pos.	Height	Weight	Year	Hometown	Notes	Ref
Darrell Miller	15	DB	5'10	178	Sophomore	Cedar Hill, TX	Left the program	
Tommy Townsend	27	P	6'1	195	RS Freshman	Orlando, FL	Transfer	
Joe Stocstill	47	TE	6'2	234	RS Senior	Lewisburg, TN	Retired	
Ray Raulerson	64	OL	6'4	287	RS Freshman	Tampa, FL	Transfer	
Dontavius Blair	74	OL	6'7	294	RS Junior	Anniston, AL	Transfer	
Cody Blanc	83	WR	6'2	206	RS Senior	Knoxville, TN	Graduated	
Neiko Creamer	88	TE	6'3	233	RS Sophomore	Wilmington, DE	Transfer	
Marquez North	8	WR	6'3	229	Junior	Charlotte, NC	Left for 2016 NFL draft	
Ralph David Abernathy IV	5	RB	5'6	185	RS Senior	Atlanta, GA	Graduate transfer	
Von Pearson	9	WR	6'3	183	Senior	Newport News, VA	Graduated	
Ladarrell McNeil	33	DB	6'1	215	Senior	Dallas, TX	Graduated	
Brian Randolph	37	DB	6'0	209	RS Senior	Marietta, GA	Graduated	
Chris Weatherd	42	LB	6'4	225	Senior	Carrollton, TX	Graduated	
Alex Ellis	48	TE	6'5	240	RS Senior	Delmar, DE	Graduated	
Curt Maggitt	56	LB	6'3	246	RS Senior	West Palm Beach, FL	Graduated	
Mack Crowder	57	OL	6'2	295	RS Senior	Bristol, TN	Graduated	
Owen Williams	58	DL	6'2	288	RS Senior	Macon, GA	Graduated	
Marcus Jackson	75	OL	6'2	306	RS Senior	Vero Beach, FL	Graduated	
Kyler Kerbyson	77	OL	6'4	318	RS Senior	Knoxville, TN	Graduated	
Johnathon Johnson	81	WR	5'9	186	Senior	Friendswood, TX	Graduated	
Trevarris Saulsberry	96	DL	6'4	296	RS Senior	Gainesville, FL	Graduated	

=== Winter months ===
During the early part of the offseason, a number of players and coaches left the program. Freshman quarterback Sherion Jones announced he was transferring from Tennessee to Colorado on January 7. He returned to Tennessee on January 27. John Jancek, a member of Butch Jones's coaching staff since his time with Central Michigan and Cincinnati, was relieved of his duties as defensive coordinator on January 6. Jones said that he and Jancek "had a long discussion this morning and we both came to the conclusion that it was best to part ways. I want to thank Coach Jancek for his contributions to the University of Tennessee football program the past three years. His hard work and dedication to this program played a major role in our back-to-back bowl wins. These decisions are never easy especially for someone I have worked with at three different schools." Penn State defensive coordinator Bob Shoop was hired for the same position at Tennessee on January 9. Larry Scott, who served as the interim head coach for the final six games of the Miami Hurricanes's 2015 season, was hired to be Tennessee's new tight ends coach on January 4.

=== Summer months ===
==== SEC Media Days ====
During Tennessee's turn at SEC Media Days in Hoover, Alabama, Coach Jones and the three attending players made it clear that they were there with the mindset of "business as usual" and not to create news or hype despite being the favorites to win the SEC East. Cameron Sutton responded to questions about Tennessee's game against Florida with how the team's season will "open up with Appalachian State, who was an 11-win team last year. We don't consider ourselves worried about games long down the road. It's one week at a time, one game at a time. That's our mindset right now. We're focused on Appalachian State." Hobbs responded to the hype around Tennessee as being "outside. Noise, really. You can't really control hype. You can't really control what other people say. What you can control is how you approach each day, how you focus on the details, how are you getting better as a player and how is the team getting better every single day you step on the field? We're focused on that — what we can control because we can't really do anything (about) what we can't control." Jones responded to questions about Tennessee blowing late leads against Oklahoma, Florida, Arkansas and Alabama by pointing out in "the last 18 games, we're 13–5. And the amazing thing, when you look at it of being 13–5 over the last 18 games, is those five losses have come by a combined total of 25 points. So what are we doing to take the next step as a football program? We talk about learning how to finish games, learning how to close games out. We talked about clutch plays, making critical plays at critical moments of the game."

On the final day of SEC Media Days, Tennessee received 225 of 331 first-place votes and were selected by the media as the favorite to win the SEC Eastern Division for the first time since 2005. However, the Vols were picked to lose to Alabama in the SEC Championship Game receiving 29 votes to the Crimson Tide's 223. "You want those expectations," Coach Jones said. "I think it's a compliment to everyone in our program of how far we've come. It's not where you start, it's where you finish. But I think it is a compliment in how we've grown and developed this football program."

==== Preseason camp ====
The Volunteers opened up preseason camp on August 1, 31 days prior to their kickoff against the Appalachian State Mountaineers. Among the biggest questions going into preseason camp for the Vols included the development of senior quarterback Joshua Dobbs, who would start at left tackle, maintaining overall health, how new defensive coordinator Bob Shoop would work with a stacked defensive corp and if Tennessee can live up to the expectations surrounding the team.

After the first week of camp, the biggest issue facing the team – according to Coach Jones – was the consistency in the passing game. This was compounded by a young wide receiver group that showed speed, but had many dropped balls. Another issue was that no starters for either left or right tackle had been announced. Coach Jones said he's been pleased with the competition and talent level of those fighting for the positions, but that the roles are anyone's for the taking. Jalen Hurd, who's short of the school rushing record, said he's targeting Travis Henry's career rushing record of 3,078 yards. He believes "it's reachable and, you know, you can see it, I definitely want to do it. That's a goal of mine. But obviously the biggest goal for me is just to help get my team a national championship."

== Personnel ==
=== Roster & staff ===
2016 Tennessee Volunteers football team roster
Players
Coaches
Offense

Pos.	#	Name	Class
QB	2	Jarrett Guarantano	Fr
WR	3	Josh Malone	Jr
RB	4	John Kelly	So
RB	6	Alvin Kamara	Jr
WR	7	Preston Williams	So
WR	8	Latrell Williams	Fr
WR	9	Marquez Callaway	Fr
WR	10	Tyler Byrd	Fr
QB	11	Joshua Dobbs	Sr
QB	12	Quinten Dormady	So
QB	13	Sheriron Jones	So
QB	14	Zac Jancek	Fr
WR	15	Jauan Jennings	So
WR	17	Brandon Johnson	Fr
TE	18	Jason Croom	Sr
WR	19	Jeff George	Jr
WR	20	Vincent Perry	Fr
WR	24	Michael Lacey	Fr
WR	25	Josh Smith	Jr
WR	26	Ben Powlas	Fr
RB	27	Carlin Files-Aime	Fr
WR	28	Will Martinez	Jr
RB	31	Jeremy Lewis	Fr
RB	35	Taeler Dowdy	Fr
RB	37	Jayson Sparks	Jr
WR	38	Jaye Rochell	Sr
RB	42	Chip Omer	Fr
TE	44	Jakob Johnson	Jr
OL	50	Venzell Boulware	Fr
OL	51	Drew Richmond	Fr
OL	55	Coleman Thomas	Jr
OL	57	Nathan Niehaus	Fr
OL	60	Austin Sanders	Jr
OL	63	Brett Kendrick	Jr
OL	64	Tommy Sprague	Fr
OL	66	Jack Jones	So
OL	68	Marcus Tatum	Fr
OL	69	Brian Garvey	Fr
OL	70	Ryan Johnson	Fr
OL	71	Dylan Wiesman (injured)	Sr
OL	75	Jashon Robertson	Jr
OL	76	Chance Hall (injured)	So
OL	78	Charles Mosley	So
OL	79	Thomas Edwards	Jr
TE	80	Eli Wolf	Fr
TE	81	Austin Pope	Fr
TE	82	Ethan Wolf	Jr
TE	84	Devante Brooks	Fr
WR	85	Thomas Orradre	So
TE	86	Andrew Craig	Fr
WR	87	Logan Fetzner	Jr

Defense

Pos.	#	Name	Class
DL	1	Jonathan Kongbo	So
DL	2	Shy Tuttle (injured)	So
DB	3	Marquill Osborne	Fr
DL	4	LaTroy Lewis	Sr
DL	5	Kyle Phillips	So
DB	7	Rashaan Gaulden	So
DB	8	Justin Martin	Jr
DE	9	Derek Barnett	Jr
DB	10	D.J. Henderson	Jr
LB	11	Austin Smith	So
DB	12	Emmanuel Moseley	Jr
DB	13	Malik Foreman	Sr
LB	14	Quart'e Sapp	So
LB	17	Dillon Bates	So
DB	18	Nigel Warrior	Fr
DL	19	Darrell Taylor	Fr
LB	20	Cortez McDowell	Jr
LB	21	Jalen Reeves-Maybin (injured)	Sr
DB	22	Micah Abernathy	So
DB	23	Cameron Sutton	Sr
DB	24	Todd Kelly Jr.	Jr
DB	26	Stephen Griffin	So
DB	28	Baylen Buchanan	Fr
DB	29	Evan Berry	Jr
DB	30	Devin Williams	Sr
DB	33	MaLeik Gatewood	Fr
LB	34	Darrin Kirkland Jr	So
LB	35	Daniel Bituli	Fr
LB	36	Gavin Bryant	So
DL	39	Kendal Vickers	Jr
DL	40	Dimarya Mixon	Jr
LB	41	Elliott Berry	Jr
LB	47	Landon Knoll	Fr
LB	48	Ja'Quain Blakely	Fr
DE	50	Corey Vereen	Sr
LB	51	Kenny Bynum	Sr
DL	52	Andrew Butcher	Fr
LB	53	Colton Jumper	Jr
DL	55	Quay Picou	So
DL	90	Charles Folger	Sr
DL	96	Joey Cave	Fr
DL	97	Paul Bain	So
DL	98	Alexis Johnson (injured)	Jr
DL	99	Kahlil McKenzie	So

Special teams

Pos.	#	Name	Class
PK	25	Aaron Medley	Jr
H	31	Parker Henry	So
P	36	Grayson Linde	Fr
H	39	Alex Jones	Fr
PK	43	Laszlo Toser	Fr
LS	46	Riley Lovingood	Fr
LS	52	Elijah Medford	So
LS	64	Logan Punch	Fr
P	93	Trevor Daniel	Jr
PK	97	Jackson Morris	Fr

Head coach

- Butch Jones – 4th year

Coordinators/assistant coaches

- Mike DeBord (offensive coordinator/quarterbacks coach) – 2nd year
- Bob Shoop (defensive coordinator) – 1st year
- Willie Martinez (assistant head coach/defensive backs coach) – 4th year
- Steve Stripling (Associate head coach/defensive line coach) – 4th year
- Zach Azzanni (wide receivers coach/passing game coordinator) – 4th year
- Robert Gillespie (running backs coach/recruiting coordinator) – 4th year
- Don Mahoney (offensive line coach) – 4th year
- Larry Scott (Tight Ends Coach/special teams coordinator) – 1st year
- Tommy Thigpen (Linebackers Coach) – 4th year
- Michael Szerszen (director of strength and conditioning) – 1st year

Legend

- (C) Team captain
- (S) Suspended
- (I) Ineligible
- Injured
- Redshirt

Roster
Last update: November 12, 2016

=== 2016 recruiting class ===
College recruiting (2016)
Name	Hometown	School	Height	Weight	Commit date
Daniel Bituli; LB	Nashville, TN	Nashville Christian School	6 ft 3 in (1.91 m)	228 lb (103 kg)	Jul 18, 2015
Daniel Bituli; LB	Recruit ratings: Scout: Rivals: 247Sports: ESPN:				
Ja'Quain Blakely; LB	Moultrie, GA	Colquitt County	6 ft 2 in (1.88 m)	210 lb (95 kg)	Aug 2, 2015
Ja'Quain Blakely; LB	Recruit ratings: Scout: Rivals: 247Sports: ESPN:				
Devante Brooks; TE	Washington, DC	St. John's College	6 ft 5 in (1.96 m)	225 lb (102 kg)	Jan 15, 2015
Devante Brooks; TE	Recruit ratings: Scout: Rivals: 247Sports: ESPN:				
Baylen Buchanan; DB	Suwanee, GA	Peachtree Ridge	5 ft 11 in (1.80 m)	187 lb (85 kg)	Jan 1, 2016
Baylen Buchanan; DB	Recruit ratings: Scout: Rivals: 247Sports: ESPN:				
Tyler Byrd; ATH	Naples, FL	Naples	5 ft 11.5 in (1.82 m)	194 lb (88 kg)	Feb 2, 2016
Tyler Byrd; ATH	Recruit ratings: Scout: Rivals: 247Sports: ESPN:				
Marquez Callaway; ATH	Warner Robins, GA	Warner Robins	6 ft 1.5 in (1.87 m)	177 lb (80 kg)	Jan 21, 2016
Marquez Callaway; ATH	Recruit ratings: Scout: Rivals: 247Sports: ESPN:				
Carlin Fils-Aime; RB	Naples, FL	Naples	5 ft 11 in (1.80 m)	175 lb (79 kg)	Jul 30, 2015
Carlin Fils-Aime; RB	Recruit ratings: Scout: Rivals: 247Sports: ESPN:				
Jeff George; WR	Dodge City, KS	Dodge City C.C.	6 ft 6 in (1.98 m)	190 lb (86 kg)	Jun 6, 2015
Jeff George; WR	Recruit ratings: Scout: Rivals: 247Sports: ESPN:				
Jarrett Guarantano; QB	Oradell, NJ	Bergen Catholic	6 ft 4 in (1.93 m)	188 lb (85 kg)	Apr 15, 2015
Jarrett Guarantano; QB	Recruit ratings: Scout: Rivals: 247Sports: ESPN:				
Corey Henderson; WR	Shreveport, LA	Memphis University School	6 ft 1 in (1.85 m)	170 lb (77 kg)	Mar 30, 2015
Corey Henderson; WR	Recruit ratings: Scout: Rivals: 247Sports: ESPN:				
D.J. Henderson; DB	Dodge City, KS	Dodge City C.C.	6 ft 1 in (1.85 m)	180 lb (82 kg)	Sep 17, 2015
D.J. Henderson; DB	Recruit ratings: Scout: Rivals: 247Sports: ESPN:				
Alexis Johnson; DT	Fort Scott, KS	Fort Scott C.C.	6 ft 1 in (1.85 m)	180 lb (82 kg)	Sep 17, 2015
Alexis Johnson; DT	Recruit ratings: Scout: Rivals: 247Sports: ESPN:				
Brandon Johnson; WR	Plantation, FL	American Heritage	6 ft 2 in (1.88 m)	175 lb (79 kg)	Sep 2, 2015
Brandon Johnson; WR	Recruit ratings: Scout: Rivals: 247Sports: ESPN:				
Ryan Johnson; OL	Brentwood, TN	Brentwood Academy	6 ft 6 in (1.98 m)	275 lb (125 kg)	Jul 19, 2014
Ryan Johnson; OL	Recruit ratings: Scout: Rivals: 247Sports: ESPN:				
Jonathan Kongbo; DE	Surrey, BC, CA	Arizona Western C.C.	6 ft 5.5 in (1.97 m)	264 lb (120 kg)	Feb 3, 2016
Jonathan Kongbo; DE	Recruit ratings: Scout: Rivals: 247Sports: ESPN:				
Nathan Niehaus; OL	Cincinnati, OH	Colerain	6 ft 6 in (1.98 m)	255 lb (116 kg)	Jan 1, 2016
Nathan Niehaus; OL	Recruit ratings: Scout: Rivals: 247Sports: ESPN:				
Marquill Osborne; DB	Charlotte, NC	Hough	5 ft 11 in (1.80 m)	183 lb (83 kg)	Sep 6, 2014
Marquill Osborne; DB	Recruit ratings: Scout: Rivals: 247Sports: ESPN:				
Austin Pope; TE	Knoxville, TN	Christian Academy of Knoxville	6 ft 4 in (1.93 m)	218 lb (99 kg)	Jun 15, 2015
Austin Pope; TE	Recruit ratings: Scout: Rivals: 247Sports: ESPN:				
Marcus Tatum; OT	Daytona Beach, FL	Mainland	6 ft 6.5 in (1.99 m)	255 lb (116 kg)	Jan 11, 2016
Marcus Tatum; OT	Recruit ratings: Scout: Rivals: 247Sports: ESPN:				
Nigel Warrior; S	Suwanee, GA	Peachtree Ridge	5 ft 11 in (1.80 m)	189 lb (86 kg)	Feb 3, 2016
Nigel Warrior; S	Recruit ratings: Scout: Rivals: 247Sports: ESPN:				
Latrell Williams; WR	Lake City, FL	Columbia	5 ft 11 in (1.80 m)	171 lb (78 kg)	Feb 3, 2016
Latrell Williams; WR	Recruit ratings: Scout: Rivals: 247Sports: ESPN:				
Overall recruit ranking: Scout: 17 Rivals: 14 247Sports: 14 ESPN: 16
Note: In many cases, Scout, Rivals, 247Sports, On3, and ESPN may conflict in their listings of height and weight.; In these cases, the average was taken. ESPN grades are on a 100-point scale.; Sources: "2016 Team Ranking". Rivals.com.; "2016 Tennessee Volunteers football team". 247Sports.

=== Returning starters ===
Nine players return on offense, eight on defense and two out of four on special teams specific positions.

==== Offense ====
Player	Class	Position
Chance Hall	Sophomore	OL
Jashon Robertson	Junior	OL
Coleman Thomas	Junior	OL
Dylan Wiesman	Senior	OL
Joshua Dobbs	Senior	QB
Jalen Hurd	Junior	RB
Alvin Kamara	RS Junior	RB
Josh Malone	Junior	WR
Jauan Jennings	Sophomore	WR

==== Defense ====
Player	Class	Position
Malik Foreman	Senior	CB/S
Justin Martin	Junior	CB
Cameron Sutton	Senior	CB
Derek Barnett	Junior	DE
Corey Vereen	Senior	DE
Kendal Vickers	RS Junior	DT
Jalen Reeves-Maybin	Senior	LB
Darrin Kirkland Jr.	Sophomore	LB

==== Special teams ====
Player	Class	Position
Aaron Medley	Junior	K
Trevor Daniel	RS Junior	P

=== Current depth chart ===
Defense

NB
Rashaan Gaulden
Malik Foreman

FS
Micah Abernathy
Nigel Warrior

WLB	MLB
Colton Jumper	Darrin Kirkland Jr.
Cortez McDowell	Colton Jumper

SS
Todd Kelly Jr.
Stephen Griffin

CB
Emmanuel Moseley
Justin Martin

DE	DT	DT	DE
Derek Barnett	Kendal Vickers	Kyle Phillips	Corey Vereen
Jonathan Kongbo	Kyle Phillips	Quay Picou	LaTroy Lewis

CB
Malik Foreman
Justin Martin

Offense

X
Josh Malone
Marquez Callaway

W
Josh Smith
Tyler Byrd

LT	LG	C	RG	RT
Brett Kendrick	Jashon Robertson	Dylan Wiesman	Jack Jones	Chance Hall
Drew Richmond	Venzell Boulware	Coleman Thomas	Dylan Wiesman	Marcus Tatum

TE
Ethan Wolf
Jason Croom

Z
Jauan Jennings
Brandon Johnson

QB
Joshua Dobbs
Quinten Dormady

RB
John Kelly
Carlin Fils-Aime

Special teams
PK Aaron Medley
P Trevor Daniel
KR Evan Berry
PR Josh Smith
LS Riley Lovingood
H Parker Henry

== Schedule ==
Tennessee announced their 2016 football schedule on October 29, 2015. The 2016 schedule consists of seven home games, four away games and one neutral site game in the regular season. The Vols will host SEC foes Alabama, Florida, Kentucky, and Missouri, and will travel to Georgia, South Carolina, Texas A&M, and Vanderbilt.

Tennessee opened the season at home for the third time in the last four seasons, when it played host to Appalachian State on September 3 in the first meeting between the two schools. The Volunteers later faced Virginia Tech in the "Battle at Bristol" at Bristol, Tennessee, on September 10 in front of the largest crowd in football history, over 156,000 fans at Bristol Motor Speedway.

Tennessee returns to Neyland Stadium for two home games, Ohio on September 17 and the Florida Gators on September 24. The Volunteers have faced the Gators to start the conference schedule 13 of the last 14 years. The first of two road games occurs at Georgia on October 1. Tennessee holds a 22–21–2 edge in the rivals' series, but is also seeking its first victory in Athens since 2006. On October 8, the Volunteers make their first-ever trip to College Station, Texas, to face Texas A&M. It will also be the first regular-season meeting between the schools. Tennessee is 2–0 all-time against the Aggies in post-season play. The Volunteers will also return to tradition this year with their annual November rivalry game against Kentucky on November 12, after last being played in October 2015.

Date	Time	Opponent	Rank	Site	TV	Result	Attendance
September 1	7:30 p.m.	Appalachian State*	No. 9	Neyland Stadium; Knoxville, TN (SEC Nation)	SECN	W 20–13 ^{OT}	100,074
September 10	8:00 p.m.	vs. Virginia Tech*	No. 17	Bristol Motor Speedway; Bristol, TN (Battle at Bristol) (College GameDay)	ABC	W 45–24	156,990^{‡}
September 17	Noon	Ohio*	No. 15	Neyland Stadium; Knoxville, TN	SECN	W 28–19	101,362
September 24	3:30 p.m.	No. 19 Florida	No. 14	Neyland Stadium; Knoxville, TN (rivalry) (College GameDay) (Checker Neyland)	CBS	W 38–28	102,455
October 1	3:30 p.m.	at No. 25 Georgia	No. 11	Sanford Stadium; Athens, GA (rivalry / SEC Nation)	CBS	W 34–31	92,746
October 8	3:30 p.m.	at No. 8 Texas A&M	No. 9	Kyle Field; College Station, TX (College GameDay)	CBS	L 38–45 ^{2OT}	106,248
October 15	3:30 p.m.	No. 1 Alabama	No. 9	Neyland Stadium; Knoxville, TN (Third Saturday in October / SEC Nation)	CBS	L 10–49	102,455
October 29	7:15 p.m.	at South Carolina	No. 18	Williams-Brice Stadium; Columbia, SC (rivalry)	ESPN2	L 21–24	78,696
November 5	4:00 p.m.	Tennessee Tech*^{†}		Neyland Stadium; Knoxville, TN	SECN	W 55–0	98,343
November 12	Noon	Kentucky		Neyland Stadium; Knoxville, TN (rivalry)	SECN	W 49–36	101,075
November 19	3:30 p.m.	Missouri	No. 19	Neyland Stadium; Knoxville, TN	CBS	W 63–37	101,012
November 26	7:30 p.m.	at Vanderbilt	No. 17	Vanderbilt Stadium; Nashville, TN (rivalry)	SECN	L 34–45	38,108
December 30	3:30 p.m.	vs. Nebraska*	No. 21	Nissan Stadium; Nashville, TN (Music City Bowl)	ESPN	W 38–24	68,496
*Non-conference game; ^{†}Homecoming; Rankings from AP Poll and CFP Rankings after November 1 released prior to game; All times are in Eastern time

Schedule source:

‡ – Current NCAA record for largest attendance to a collegiate football game.

== Rankings ==
Ranking movements Legend: ██ Increase in ranking ██ Decrease in ranking — = Not ranked RV = Received votes ( ) = First-place votes
	Week															
Poll	Pre	1	2	3	4	5	6	7	8	9	10	11	12	13	14	Final
AP	9	17	15	14	11	9	9	18	18	RV	RV	RV	24	RV	RV	22
Coaches	10 (1)	14	15	12	11	9	11	19	18	RV	RV	RV	24	RV	RV	24
CFP	Not released									—	—	19	17	22	21	Not released

== Game summaries ==
=== Appalachian State ===
Team	1	2	3	4	OT	Total
Appalachian State	7	6	0	0	0	13
• No. 9 Tennessee	3	0	3	7	7	20

- Location:
  Knoxville, Tennessee
- Game start: 7:36 p.m.
- Elapsed time: 3:29
- Game attendance: 100,074
- Game weather: Temperature: 76 °F (24 °C) • Wind: 6 mph (9.7 km/h) • Weather: partly cloudy
- Referee: Marc Curles • Umpire: Brent Sowell • Linesman: Gary Jayroe • Line judge: Chris Conway • Back judge: Scott Vaughan • Field judge: Wes Booker • Side judge: Chuck Russ • Center judge: Wayne Winkler
- TV announcers (SECN): Brent Musburger (play-by-play), Jesse Palmer (color), Laura Rutledge (sidelines)

Scoring summary
1	10:56	APST	Taylor Lamb 5 yard rush (Michael Rubino kick)	APST 7–0
1	6:14	TENN	Aaron Medley 23 yard field goal	APST 7–3
2	8:53	APST	Taylor Lamb 33 yard pass to Marcus Cox (Michael Rubino kick failed)	APST 13–3
3	3:00	TENN	Aaron Medley 39 yard field goal	APST 13–6
4	10:30	TENN	Joshua Dobbs 67 yard pass to Josh Malone (Aaron Medley kick)	Tie 13–13
OT	—	TENN	Jalen Hurd fumble recovery (Aaron Medley kick)	TENN 20–13

The ninth–ranked Tennessee Volunteers overcame a 10-point halftime deficit to escape with a 20–13 victory over the Appalachian State Mountaineers. In overtime, Tennessee faced third-and-goal from the 2, when Joshua Dobbs ran then lost control of the ball as he was hit while extending his arms across the goal line. Jalen Hurd recovered the fumble in the end zone, and Aaron Medley kicked the extra point. In the Mountaineers' ensuing drive, Tennessee's Micah Abernathy ended the game by breaking up an end-zone pass on fourth–and–5 from the 20. Tennessee head coach Butch Jones commented after the game: "The first game of the year is always a game of the unknowns. We're still developing our identity for this football team, but we found a way to win, and at the end of the day, that's what it's about, but we have to get a lot better. Credit App State too. They're a really good football team."

=== Virginia Tech ===
Battle at Bristol

Team	1	2	3	4	Total
Virginia Tech	14	0	3	7	24
• No. 17 Tennessee	0	24	7	14	45

- Location: Bristol, Tennessee
- Game start: 8:23 p.m.
- Elapsed time: 3:39
- Game attendance: 156,990
- Game weather: Temperature: 84 °F (29 °C) • Wind: 4 mph (6.4 km/h) • Weather: Cloudy
- Referee: Daniel Capron • Umpire: Steven Woods • Linesman: John Wiercinski • Line judge: Brian Bolinger • Back judge: Kevin Schwarzel • Field judge: Jeffrey Noggle • Side judge: Bobby Sagers • Center judge: Brent Durbin
- TV announcers (ABC): Rece Davis (play-by-play), Kirk Herbstreit (color), Samantha Ponder (sidelines)

Scoring summary
1	4:32	VT	Jerod Evans 7 yard pass to Sam Rogers (Joey Slye kick)	VT 7–0
1	2:48	VT	Travon McMillian 69 yard run (Joey Slye kick)	VT 14–0
2	14:43	TENN	Joshua Dobbs 5 yard pass to Jauan Jennings (Aaron Medley kick)	VT 14–7
2	9:42	TENN	Joshua Dobbs 38 yard pass to Josh Malone (Aaron Medley kick)	Tie 14–14
2	5:30	TENN	Aaron Medley 34 yard field goal	TENN 17–14
2	0:39	TENN	Joshua Dobbs 5 yard run (Aaron Medley kick)	TENN 24–14
3	7:04	TENN	Joshua Dobbs 23 yard pass to Alvin Kamara (Aaron Medley kick)	TENN 31–14
3	3:41	VT	Joey Slye 26 yard field goal	TENN 31–17
4	6:45	TENN	Joshua Dobbs 27 yard run (Aaron Medley kick)	TENN 38–17
4	6:32	TENN	John Kelly 4 yard run (Aaron Medley kick)	TENN 45–17
4	3:28	VT	Shai McKenzie 2 yard run (Joey Slye kick)	TENN 45–24

Despite the previous week's victory, Tennessee dropped nine spots in the AP Poll. Before an NCAA-record attendance of 156,990 in the "Battle at Bristol" against the Virginia Tech Hokies, the seventeenth-ranked Volunteers overcame a 14-point first-quarter deficit to score 24 points in the second quarter to win 45–24. Quarterback Joshua Dobbs threw three touchdown passes and had two rushing scores. Volunteers defensive back Micah Abernathy also set a school single-game record with three fumble recoveries. The Hokies ultimately lost five fumbles, three of which resulted in Tennessee touchdowns. Abernathy's performance earned him SEC Defensive Player of the Week honors.

Following the game, Tennessee head coach Butch Jones called the venue "a spectacle ... I don't think this will be duplicated or replicated." About the game, Jones stated "We didn't start out like we wanted to obviously, down 14–0, but I really liked the way we responded ... We were finally able to run the football and play Tennessee style of football." The Volunteers extend their eight-game winning streak, the longest since their 14 in a row in the 1998 and 1999 seasons, and the third longest active winning streak in the nation.

=== Ohio ===
Team	1	2	3	4	Total
Ohio	6	6	7	0	19
• No. 15 Tennessee	7	7	7	7	28

- Location:
  Knoxville, Tennessee
- Game start: 12:02 p.m.
- Elapsed time: 3:32
- Game attendance: 101,362
- Game weather: Temperature: 83 °F (28 °C) • Wind: 3 mph (4.8 km/h) • Weather: sunny
- Referee: James Carter • Umpire: Rick Lowe • Linesman: Johnny Crawford • Line judge: Tim Beard • Back judge: Dax Hill • Field judge: J. Taylor • Side judge: A. Jeffries • Center judge: Chris Garner
- TV announcers (SECN): Tom Hart (play-by-play), Andre Ware (color), Cole Cubelic (sidelines)

Scoring summary
1	14:22	TENN	Josh Malone 20 Yd pass from Joshua Dobbs (Aaron Medley Kick)	TENN 7–0
1	8:45	OHIO	Louie Zervos 38 Yd Field Goal	TENN 7–3
1	3:04	OHIO	Louie Zervos 29 Yd Field Goal	TENN 7–6
2	14:38	TENN	Jalen Hurd 1 Yd Run (Aaron Medley Kick)	TENN 14–6
2	11:49	OHIO	Louie Zervos 30 Yd Field Goal	TENN 14–9
2	6:02	OHIO	Louie Zervos 30 Yd Field Goal	TENN 14–12
3	4:57	TENN	Joshua Dobbs 12 Yd Run (Aaron Medley Kick)	TENN 21–12
3	1:09	OHIO	Jordan Reid 4 Yd pass from Greg Windham (Louie Zervos Kick)	TENN 21–19
4	11:07	TENN	Josh Malone 20 Yd pass from Joshua Dobbs (Aaron Medley Kick)	TENN 28–19

Plagued with injuries prior to and during the game against the Ohio Bobcats, the fifteenth-ranked Volunteers struggled in the afternoon heat but maintained their early lead, winning 28–19. Tennessee scored 38 seconds into the game on a 20-yard pass from Joshua Dobbs to Josh Malone. Ohio, a 27-point underdog, remained relatively close throughout the game, until Dobbs and Malone connected again for a 20-yard touchdown, and the game's last scoring drive, with 11:07 remaining in the fourth quarter. Tennessee head coach Butch Jones called it "another gritty win" and spoke on starting conference play next week, "Our goal was to be 3–0 at this point, and we are 3–0, but I think everyone will tell you that we have to get a lot better." The win over Ohio gave Tennessee their first 3–0 start since the 2004 season.

=== No. 19 Florida ===
Team	1	2	3	4	Total
No. 19 Florida	7	14	0	7	28
• No. 14 Tennessee	0	3	14	21	38

- Location:
  Knoxville, Tennessee
- Game start: 3:39 p.m.
- Elapsed time: 3:46
- Game attendance: 102,455
- Game weather: Temperature: 91 °F (33 °C) • Wind: 5 mph (8.0 km/h) • Weather: sunny
- Referee: Matt Loeffler • Umpire: Stan Weihe • Linesman: Tim Sistrunk • Line judge: Michael Shirey • Back judge: Tony Josselyn • Field judge: Bobby Ables • Side judge: Jesse Dupuy • Center judge: Chris Snead
- TV announcers (CBS): Verne Lundquist (play-by-play), Gary Danielson (color), Allie LaForce (sidelines)

Scoring summary
1	13:35	FLA	DeAndre Goolsby 3 Yd pass from Austin Appleby (Eddy Piñeiro Kick)	FLA 7–0
2	14:10	FLA	Jordan Cronkrite 15 Yd pass from Austin Appleby (Eddy Piñeiro Kick)	FLA 14–0
2	5:12	FLA	Jordan Scarlett 1 Yd Run (Eddy Piñeiro Kick)	FLA 21–0
2	2:39	TENN	Aaron Medley 28 Yd Field Goal	FLA 21–3
3	7:29	TENN	Jalen Hurd 23 Yd pass from Joshua Dobbs (Aaron Medley Kick)	FLA 21–10
3	0:59	TENN	Ethan Wolf 20 Yd pass from Joshua Dobbs (Aaron Medley Kick)	FLA 21–17
4	12:45	TENN	Jauan Jennings 67 Yd pass from Joshua Dobbs (Aaron Medley Kick)	TENN 24–21
4	11:46	TENN	Josh Malone 42 Yd pass from Joshua Dobbs (Aaron Medley Kick)	TENN 31–21
4	8:27	TENN	Joshua Dobbs 5 Yd Run (Aaron Medley Kick)	TENN 38–21
4	4:17	FLA	Freddie Swain 10 Yd pass from Austin Appleby (Eddy Piñeiro Kick)	TENN 38–28

The 14th-ranked Volunteers trailed their rivals, the 19th-ranked Florida Gators, 21–3 at halftime. Tennessee mounted a comeback in the second half, scoring 35 unanswered points and snapping an 11-game losing streak, to win 38–28. Quarterback Joshua Dobbs threw four touchdowns, ran for another, and amassed a career-high 319 passing yards. On the defensive side, Derek Barnett had five tackles (three solo), two sacks for six yards, three tackles for loss for eight yards and one pass breakup. For their performances, Dobbs and Barnett were awarded SEC Players of the Week, with Dobbs as Offensive POW and Barnett as Co-defensive Lineman POW.

The win gave the Volunteers their 12th double-digit winning streak (10) in program history. The win streak is also the longest of head coach Butch Jones' career. Following the game, Jones spoke on the resiliency of his team, "Must win, all that – that is not the case. We are building something special here with character and competitiveness. It's just one game. We've got to go on the road next week. The resolve of these kids, with all the expectations on this football game and you go down at half time and to have that second half performance. If you don't have character in your football program, that does not happen."

=== No. 25 Georgia ===
Georgia vs. Tennessee at Sanford Stadium

Team	1	2	3	4	Total
• No. 11 Tennessee	0	7	7	20	34
No. 25 Georgia	7	10	7	7	31

- Location: Athens, Georgia
- Game start: 3:39 p.m.
- Elapsed time: 3:36
- Game attendance: 92,746
- Game weather: Temperature: 78 °F (26 °C) • Wind: 3 mph (4.8 km/h) • Weather: sunny
- Referee: John McDaid • Umpire: Tom Quick • Linesman: Gary Jayroe • Line judge: David Oliver • Back judge: Grantis Bell • Field judge: Phil Davenport • Side judge: Chris Conley • Center judge: Brian Davis
- TV announcers (CBS): Verne Lundquist (play-by-play), Gary Danielson (color), Allie LaForce (sidelines)

Scoring summary
1	1:33	UGA	Sony Michel run for 14 yds (Rodrigo Blankenship kick)	UGA 7–0
2	11:21	UGA	Blankenship 27 yd field goal	UGA 10–0
2	2:00	UGA	Jacob Eason fumble recovery, (Blankenship kick)	UGA 17–0
2	0:12	TENN	Joshua Dobbs run for 4 yds (Aaron Medley kick)	UGA 17–7
3	10:31	TENN	Dobbs pass to Jalen Hurd for 19 yds (Medley kick)	UGA 17–14
3	4:07	UGA	Eason pass to Isacc Nauta for 50 yds (Blankenship kick)	UGA 24–14
4	14:53	TENN	Dobbs pass to Alvin Kamara for 16 yds (Medley kick)	UGA 24–21
4	2:56	TENN	Corey Vereen fumble recovery (Medley kick)	TENN 28–24
4	0:10	UGA	Eason pass to Riley Ridley for 47 yds (Blankenship kick)	UGA 31–28
4	0:00	TENN	Dobbs pass to Jauan Jennings for 43 yds	TENN 34–31

The 11th-ranked Tennessee Volunteers rallied from a double-digit deficit, the fourth time in five games, to defeat the 25th-ranked Georgia Bulldogs, 34–31. Georgia led 17–0 in the first half but only had a 24–21 edge when starting deep in its own territory late in the fourth quarter. Georgia quarterback Jacob Eason risked a pass from his own end zone but fumbled the ball after being hit by two defenders, Derek Barnett and Cortez McDowell. Tennessee's Corey Vereen fell on it for a touchdown. Eason seemed to redeem himself within the closing seconds of the game, by driving his offense past midfield. He then found Riley Ridley, streaking down the left sideline, and delivered a 47-yard pass that Ridley took in for the score. However, in the short ensuing kickoff, Tennessee's Evan Berry's 20-yard return put his team at midfield. With four seconds left in the game, quarterback Joshua Dobbs threw a 43-yard Hail Mary pass and connected with Jauan Jennings, who was just inside the end zone and in front of most of his Georgia defenders, for the win.

Barnett's forced fumble, five tackles, two sacks, and 2.5 tackles for loss earned him SEC Defensive Player of the Week honors. Long snapper Riley Lovingood was named SEC Co-Special Teams POW. In the 4th quarter, he snapped the ball to punter Trevor Daniel, who booted the high ball to the UGA 6-yard line. Lovingood raced down the field to make the catch, downing the ball to set the field position for Barnett's strip sack of Eason and Vereen's fumble recovery in the end zone two plays later.

Following the game, coach Butch Jones spoke on what he told his team before that last play, "I told our kids in the huddle that we were going to come down with it—we're going to find a way. And Josh (Dobbs) threw the best ball he's thrown in his career. And what can I say about Jauan Jennings? He wasn't going to be denied." Jones added, "Again, just resiliency ... 11 straight wins ... fifth-longest streak in school history. But really the most important thing is it gets us one step closer. We needed to be 1–0 and we were 1–0. This puts us at 5–0 overall. We're just finding ways to win football games."

=== No. 8 Texas A&M ===
Team	1	2	3	4	OT	2OT	Total
No. 9 Tennessee	7	0	7	21	3	0	38
• No. 8 Texas A&M	21	0	7	7	3	7	45

- Location:
  College Station, Texas
- Game start: 3:39 p.m.
- Elapsed time: 4:43
- Game attendance: 106,248
- Game weather: Temperature: 81 °F (27 °C) • Wind: 5 mph (8.0 km/h) • Weather: Clear
- Referee: David Smith • Umpire: Russ Pulley • Linesman: Jay Vines • Line judge: Chad Lorance • Back judge: Wayne Gautney • Field judge: Andy Britton • Side judge: M. Williams • Center judge: Michael Watson
- TV announcers (CBS): Verne Lundquist (play-by-play), Gary Danielson (color), Allie LaForce (sidelines)

Scoring summary
1	8:30	TA&M	Christian Kirk 13 Yd pass from Trevor Knight (Daniel LaCamera Kick)	TA&M 7–0
1	3:37	TENN	Joshua Dobbs 4 Yd pass from Jauan Jennings (Aaron Medley Kick)	TIE 7–7
1	2:04	TA&M	Josh Reynolds 2 Yd pass from Trevor Knight (Daniel LaCamera Kick)	TA&M 14–7
1	1:45	TA&M	Trevor Knight 7 Yd Run (Daniel LaCamera Kick)	TA&M 21–7
3	10:40	TA&M	Trayveon Williams 7 Yd Run (Daniel LaCamera Kick)	TA&M 28–7
3	7:10	TENN	Alvin Kamara 15 Yd Run (Aaron Medley Kick)	TA&M 28–14
4	6:58	TENN	John Kelly 4 Yd Run (Aaron Medley Kick)	TA&M 28–21
4	3:22	TA&M	Trevor Knight 62 Yd Run (Daniel LaCamera Kick)	TA&M 35–21
4	2:07	TENN	Alvin Kamara 4 Yd Run (Aaron Medley Kick)	TA&M 35–28
4	0:41	TENN	Alvin Kamara 18 Yd pass from Joshua Dobbs (Aaron Medley Kick)	TIE 35–35
OT		TENN	Aaron Medley 34 Yd Field Goal	TENN 38–35
OT		TA&M	Daniel LaCamera 34 Yd Field Goal	TIE 38–38
OT2		TA&M	Trevor Knight 1 Yd Run (Daniel LaCamera Kick)	TA&M 45–38

In only the third meeting between the two teams, the ninth-ranked Tennessee Volunteers visited the eighth-ranked Texas A&M Aggies at College Station, Texas. The game was the first for the teams as SEC opponents since the Aggies joined the conference in 2012. After falling behind through three quarters by a score of 28–14, Tennessee scored three touchdowns in the final seven minutes of the fourth quarter and rallied to force overtime. However, seven turnovers in the game led to the Volunteers' first loss of the season as Texas A&M won, 45–38, in double overtime.

Tennessee head coach Butch Jones spoke on his team's gameplay, "I'm very, very proud of our kids. Just the fight in them, the will to win. But again, you can't have seven turnovers, you can't turn the football over, you can't have the penalties we had. You have almost 700 yards of offense and you can't turn the football over. It's the details. Especially when you go on the road, the small details add up to the big details." Jones continued, speaking on the team's emotions and their next opponent, "That's life in the Southeastern Conference. It's not for everyone. The toughness that's involved day-to-day, week-to-week — the grind — and we have to get better in a hurry because we've got the No. 1 ranked team in the country coming in. So we have to improve on our deficiencies from this week."

=== No. 1 Alabama ===
Third Saturday in October

Team	1	2	3	4	Total
• No. 1 Alabama	14	7	14	14	49
No. 9 Tennessee	0	7	3	0	10

- Location:
  Knoxville, Tennessee
- Game start: 3:30 pm
- Elapsed time: 3:21
- Game attendance: 102,455
- Game weather: Temperature: 82 °F (28 °C) • Wind: 8 mph (13 km/h) • Weather: Clear
- Referee: Ken Williamson • Umpire: Wally Hough • Linesman: Lane Thomas • Line judge: Mickey Bryson • Back judge: Grantis Bell • Field judge: Glen Fucik • Side judge: Rob Skelton • Center judge: Tra Boger
- TV announcers (CBS): Verne Lundquist (play-by-play), Gary Danielson (color), Allie LaForce (sidelines)

Scoring summary
1	03:29	BAMA	ArDarius Stewart 29-yard run (Adam Griffith kick)	BAMA 7–0
1	0:14	BAMA	Ronnie Harrison 58-yard interception return (Adam Griffith kick)	BAMA 14–0
2	09:41	TENN	Alvin Kamara 7-yard run (Aaron Medley kick)	BAMA 14–7
2	07:22	BAMA	Jalen Hurts 45-yard run (Adam Griffith kick)	BAMA 21–7
3	09:02	BAMA	Jalen Hurts 2-yard run (Adam Griffith kick)	BAMA 28–7
3	04:03	TENN	Aaron Medley 37-yard field goal	BAMA 28–10
3	00:49	BAMA	Jalen Hurts 1 yd run (Adam Griffith kick)	BAMA 35–10
4	14:42	BAMA	Eddie Jackson 79-yard punt return (Adam Griffith kick)	BAMA 42–10
4	11:38	BAMA	Bo Scarbrough 85-yard run (Adam Griffith kick)	BAMA 49–10

The ninth-ranked Tennessee Volunteers and the top-ranked Alabama Crimson Tide met for the 99th time to renew their rivalry on the "Third Saturday in October" for the first time in four seasons. Alabama won their 10th–straight game in the series, 49–10, the worst loss for the Volunteers since losing 59–14 at Oregon in 2013. Tennessee pulled within seven in the second quarter, after forcing a fumble on the Crimson Tide's 11-yard line. Two plays later, Alvin Kamara rushed up the middle to bring the score to 14–7. However, the Volunteers' only other score in the game came in the third quarter when kicker Aaron Medley chipped in a 37-yard field goal to make the score 28–10 at the 4:03 mark.

Following the game, Tennessee head coach Butch Jones spoke on the loss. "It's a line of scrimmage game," he said. "When you give up 438 yards rushing and offensively have 32 yards rushing, you're not even giving yourself an opportunity to be in the game. We had way too many negative yardage football plays. Again, third down conversions [only 3 of 16], getting off the field, big explosive plays." Jones added about now entering a bye week, "I think the bye week is coming at the appropriate time. We have a lot of goals to get better as a football team. Everyone has to be responsible for their own self-determination and accountability to get better during this bye week. A lot of this [week] will be spent in the training room and getting healthy." Seven Volunteers could not play due to injuries, while three others were injured during gameplay.

=== South Carolina ===
Team	1	2	3	4	Total
No. 18 Tennessee	7	0	7	7	21
• South Carolina	7	7	3	7	24

- Location:
  Columbia, South Carolina
- Game start: 7:15 p.m.
- Elapsed time: 3:40
- Game attendance: 78,696
- Game weather: Temperature: 71 °F (22 °C) • Wind: 3 mph (4.8 km/h) • Weather: Clear
- Referee: James Carter • Umpire: Walt Hill • Linesman: Johnny Crawford • Line judge: Tim Beard • Back judge: Dax Hill • Field judge: J. Taylor • Side judge: A. Jeffries • Center judge: Wayne Winkler
- TV announcers (ESPN2): Mark Jones (play-by-play), Rod Gilmore (color), Quint Kessenich (sidelines)

Scoring summary
1	10:30	SC	Rico Dowdle 1-yard run (Elliott Fry kick)	SC 7–0
1	1:50	TENN	Jalen Hurd 1-yard run (Aaron Medley kick)	Tie 7–7
2	12:46	SC	Bryan Edwards 17-yard pass from Jake Bentley (Elliott Fry kick)	SC 14–7
3	1:49	SC	Elliott Fry 28-yard field goal	SC 17–7
3	1:35	TENN	Evan Berry 100-yard kickoff return (Aaron Medley kick)	SC 17–14
4	9:54	SC	K.C. Crosby 35-yard pass from Jake Bentley (Elliott Fry kick)	SC 24–14
4	7:03	TENN	Jauan Jennings 6-yard pass from Joshua Dobbs (Aaron Medley kick)	SC 24–21

Entering the 35th meeting between the two teams, the 18th-ranked Volunteers traveled to Columbia, South Carolina, to face the Gamecocks. South Carolina snapped a three-game losing streak and got their first victory over Tennessee in four years, winning 24–21. All four contests, during Coach Butch Jones' tenure, have been decided by three points or less.

The Volunteers committed three costly penalties in the first five minutes, which allowed the Gamecocks to score first. Within the last two minutes of the first quarter, Tennessee tied the game but was never again close in scoring, until Evan Berry returned a late third-quarter kickoff for 100 yards to put the Volunteers within three points at 17–14. Berry's touchdown tied Willie Gault's special-teams school career record of four. The teams swapped touchdowns in the fourth quarter, with South Carolina still leading by three. A last-minute drive advanced the Volunteers to the Carolina 40-yard line, but Aaron Medley's potentially game-tying 58-yard field goal fell short as time expired.

Coach Jones called his team's gameplay "unacceptable", adding "You go on the road, you can't turn the football over. There was a lack of explosive plays, missed tackles, too many penalties on special teams when you do a good job of getting the ball out on some returns. Those are momentum-killers ... We can't let this one loss define who we are. We've got to come back. But obviously, too sloppy. I'm just very, very disappointed in the way we played, particularly coming off a bye week. Give South Carolina credit, but that was unacceptable."

=== Tennessee Tech ===
Team	1	2	3	4	Total
Tennessee Tech	0	0	0	0	0
• Tennessee	21	17	7	10	55

- Location:
  Knoxville, Tennessee
- Game start: 4:02 p.m.
- Elapsed time: 3:21
- Game attendance: 98,343
- Game weather: Temperature: 70 °F (21 °C) • Wind: 4 mph (6.4 km/h) • Weather: Sunny
- Referee: Marc Curles • Umpire: Rick Lowe • Linesman: John Langlois • Line judge: Chris Conway • Back judge: Scott Vaughan • Field judge: Wes Booker • Side judge: Richard Rooker • Center judge: Wayne Winkler
- TV announcers (SECN): Taylor Zarzour (play-by-play), Jordan Rodgers (color), Dawn Davenport (sidelines)

Scoring summary
1	14:03	TENN	Josh Malone 30-yard pass from Joshua Dobbs (Aaron Medley kick)	TENN 7–0
1	8:46	TENN	Josh Malone 43-yard pass from Joshua Dobbs (Aaron Medley kick)	TENN 14–0
1	5:26	TENN	John Kelly 73-yard run (Aaron Medley kick)	TENN 21–0
2	14:55	TENN	Jauan Jennings 3-yard pass from Joshua Dobbs (Aaron Medley kick)	TENN 28–0
2	4:23	TENN	Carlin Fils-Aime 2-yard run (Aaron Medley Kick)	TENN 35–0
2	0:00	TENN	Aaron Medley 19-yard field goal	TENN 38–0
3	12:50	TENN	Carlin Fils-Aime 1-yard run (Aaron Medley kick)	TENN 45–0
4	11:57	TENN	Aaron Medley 42-yard field goal	TENN 48–0
4	2:54	TENN	Marquez Callaway 62-yard punt return (Holden Foster kick)	TENN 55–0

Tennessee hosted Tennessee Tech for its 100th homecoming game. The Volunteers snapped a three-game losing streak in a 55–0 blowout of the Golden Eagles. Tennessee also ended a season-long pattern of slow starts by producing six touchdowns and one field goal on its first eight possessions. The Volunteers had been outscored 83–24 in the opening quarter of their first eight games, but they led Tech, 21–0, after the first period and a 73-yard run by John Kelly, replacing Jalen Hurd due to his departure from the team earlier in the week. Kelly's run was Tennessee's longest offensive play this season and its longest run from scrimmage since 2006. With the win, Tennessee became bowl eligible for the third consecutive season.

Tennessee head coach Butch Jones called the victory a "complete team win." He added, "I loved their focus and I loved their mindset. I thought this was our best week of preparation. We practiced with energy, and talked all week long about returning to the standards and expectation with passion and energy and the inspiration that it takes to play this game, so I was really proud of them."

=== Kentucky ===
Team	1	2	3	4	Total
Kentucky	10	3	3	20	36
• Tennessee	14	7	14	14	49

- Location:
  Knoxville, Tennessee
- Game start: 12:01 p.m.
- Elapsed time: 3:49
- Game attendance: 101,075
- Game weather: Temperature: 56 °F (13 °C) • Wind: NE 8 mph (13 km/h) • Weather: Sunny
- Referee: David Smith • Umpire: Tom Quick • Linesman: Gary Jayroe • Line judge: Jim Kelley • Back judge: Wayne Gautney • Field judge: Andy Britton • Side judge: Mike Williams • Center judge: Chad Lorance
- TV announcers (SECN): Tom Hart (play-by-play), Andre Ware (color), Cole Cubelic (sidelines)

Scoring summary
1	13:09	UK	Stanley Williams 10 Yd Run (Austin MacGinnis Kick)	UK 7–0
1	10:54	TENN	Josh Smith 24 Yd pass from Joshua Dobbs (Aaron Medley Kick)	TIE 7–7
1	3:31	UK	Austin MacGinnis 37 Yd Field Goal	UK 10–7
1	1:30	TENN	Joshua Dobbs 1 Yd Run (Aaron Medley Kick)	TENN 14–10
2	9:27	UK	Austin MacGinnis 25 Yd Field Goal	TENN 14–13
2	6:27	TENN	Ethan Wolf 10 Yd pass from Joshua Dobbs (Aaron Medley Kick)	TENN 21–13
3	12:05	UK	Austin MacGinnis 33 Yd Field Goal	TENN 21–16
3	10:08	TENN	Josh Malone 51 Yd pass from Joshua Dobbs (Aaron Medley Kick)	TENN 28–16
3	3:18	TENN	Alvin Kamara 17 Yd Run (Aaron Medley Kick)	TENN 35–16
4	12:30	UK	Jojo Kemp 71 Yd Run (Two-Point Run Conversion Failed)	TENN 35–22
4	11:51	TENN	Joshua Dobbs 45 Yd Run (Aaron Medley Kick)	TENN 42–22
4	7:12	TENN	Alvin Kamara 29 Yd Run (Aaron Medley Kick)	TENN 49–22
4	3:58	UK	Sihiem King 24 Yd Run (Austin MacGinnis Kick)	TENN 49–29
4	1:41	UK	Stephen Johnson 2 Yd Run (Austin MacGinnis Kick)	TENN 49–36

The Tennessee Volunteers and the Kentucky Wildcats met for the 112th time in their rivalry. The Volunteers have played the Wildcats more than any other team in program history and improved to 79–24–9 all-time in the series with a 49–36 victory. Tennessee has now won five straight against Kentucky and 31 of the last 32 meetings.

Quarterback Joshua Dobbs amassed 370 yards and five total touchdowns (three passing, two rushing). Dobbs, returning running back Alvin Kamara, and John Kelly combined for 369 of the team's 376 total rushing yards. The two teams totaled 1,204 yards, including 789 in rushing, the most combined rushing yards in a Tennessee game this season. The Volunteers finished with 599 total yards while Kentucky gained 635. The game also saw the return of cornerback Cameron Sutton, injured in the September 10 game, with three tackles and two passes broken up.

Head coach Butch Jones called the win a "hard fought, very very good team victory." Regarding the offense, he said, "I believe we only had five third downs the entire game, which means you're winning first downs, mixed downs, first and second down. I thought our offensive line came off the ball really well." Speaking of the defense, he said, "[there's] obviously a lot of stuff to correct and improve upon, but the one thing I thought was glaring in this game was our red zone efficiency defensively. I believe we only gave up two touchdowns in six trips ... I'm just proud of our players with the resolve and the resiliency."

=== Missouri ===
Team	1	2	3	4	Total
Missouri	6	14	7	10	37
• Tennessee	7	14	14	28	63

- Location:
  Knoxville, Tennessee
- Game start: 3:41 p.m.
- Elapsed time: 3:50
- Game attendance: 101,012
- Game weather: Temperature: 51 °F (11 °C) • Wind: W 12 mph (19 km/h) • Weather: Sunny
- Referee: Hubert Owens • Umpire: Walt Hill • Linesman: Tim Sistrunk • Line judge: Chuck Rice • Back judge: Martin Hankins • Field judge: Greg Thomas • Side judge: Chad Hill • Center judge: Steve Marlowe
- TV announcers (CBS): Verne Lundquist (play-by-play), Gary Danielson (color), Allie LaForce (sidelines)

Scoring summary
1	9:07	MIZZ	Damarea Crockett 22-yard run (Ben Tesson kick failed)	MIZZ 6–0
1	6:01	TENN	Jauan Jennings 49-yard pass from Joshua Dobbs (Aaron Medley kick)	TENN 7–6
2	13:50	TENN	Josh Malone 57-yard pass from Joshua Dobbs (Aaron Medley kick)	TENN 14–6
2	8:00	MIZZ	Drew Lock 2-yard run (Tucker McCann kick)	TENN 14–13
2	5:00	TENN	Alvin Kamara 4-yard run (Aaron Medley kick)	TENN 21–13
2	2:17	MIZZ	Ish Witter 2-yard run (Tucker McCann kick)	TENN 21–20
3	13:58	TENN	Jauan Jennings 5-yard pass from Joshua Dobbs (Aaron Medley kick)	TENN 28–20
3	8:51	MIZZ	Ish Witter 1-yard run (Tucker McCann kick)	TENN 28–27
3	2:39	TENN	Joshua Dobbs 30 yd run (Aaron Medley kick)	TENN 35–27
4	14:50	MIZZ	Tucker McCann 28-yard field goal	TENN 35–30
4	13:20	TENN	Joshua Dobbs 70 yd run (Aaron Medley kick)	TENN 42–30
4	9:25	TENN	Alvin Kamara 2-yard run (Aaron Medley kick)	TENN 49–30
4	7:57	MIZZ	Dimetrios Mason 50-yard pass from Drew Lock (Tucker McCann kick)	TENN 49–37
4	5:52	TENN	John Kelly 27-yard run (Aaron Medley kick)	TENN 56–37
4	4:31	TENN	Jonathan Kongbo 59-yard interception return (Aaron Medley kick)	TENN 63–37

In the final home game of the season, senior quarterback Joshua Dobbs accounted for five touchdowns to lead the Tennessee Volunteers to a 63–37 victory over the Missouri Tigers. Dobbs passed for 223 yards, threw three touchdowns, and rushed for two more scores — including a career-long 70-yard breakaway run — to finish with a career-best 413 total yards. Total offense for Tennessee was 609 yards, 223 passing and 386 rushing. The game was relatively close until the fourth quarter, when the Volunteers outscored the Tigers 28–10. It marked the most points Tennessee had scored in a quarter this season and the first time in breaching 60 points in a game since 2009. Just as the game began in Knoxville all eyes were focused on Baton Rouge, LA, where the Florida Gators clinched the SEC East and a trip to the SEC championship game with a win over LSU, thus ending any possibility of a tie-breaker.

Head coach Butch Jones knew the game wasn't "going to be pretty", but he thought his team "really rallied". He added, "We knew it was going to be this type of game. Missouri has a very explosive offense ... It was a very fitting last game in Neyland Stadium. I'm proud of how far we've come with our football program, in the last 17 games, we're 14–3, second in the Southeastern Conference. Over the last three games, I believe we've scored over 40 points per game, and that hasn't been done since 1995 — so, a lot of good things happening. I'm proud of our seniors, and I'm proud of our football team to gut through this win and find a way to win a football game."

=== Vanderbilt ===
Team	1	2	3	4	Total
No. 24 Tennessee	14	17	3	0	34
• Vanderbilt	7	17	7	14	45

- Location:
  Nashville, Tennessee
- Game start: 7:39 pm
- Elapsed time: 3:35
- Game attendance: 38,108
- Game weather: Temperature: 46 °F (8 °C) • Wind: Calm • Weather: Clear
- Referee: Ken Williamson • Umpire: Wally Hough • Linesman: Lane Thomas • Line judge: Mickey Bryson • Back judge: Grantis Bell • Field judge: Bobby Ables • Side judge: Rob Skelton
- TV announcers (SECN): Tom Hart (play-by-play), Andre Ware (color), Cole Cubelic (sidelines)

Scoring summary
1	9:15	TENN	Alvin Kamara 14-yard run (Aaron Medley kick)	TENN 7–0
1	6:49	VAND	Bailey McElwain 18-yard pass from Kyle Shurmur (Tommy Openshaw kick)	Tied 7–7
1	3:40	TENN	Alvin Kamara 21-yard pass from Joshua Dobbs (Aaron Medley kick)	TENN 14–7
2	13:59	TENN	Alvin Kamara 1-yard run (Aaron Medley kick)	TENN 21–7
2	10:30	VAND	Sam Dobbs 20-yard pass from Kyle Shurmur (Tommy Openshaw kick)	TENN 21–14
2	7:57	VAND	Ralph Webb 9-yard run (Tommy Openshaw kick)	Tied 21–21
2	6:33	TENN	Aaron Medley 41-yard field goal	TENN 24–21
2	3:50	VAND	Tommy Openshaw 31-yard field goal	Tied 24–24
2	:54	TENN	Josh Malone 27 Yd pass from Joshua Dobbs (Aaron Medley Kick)	TENN 31–24
3	3:57	TENN	Aaron Medley 25-yard field goal	TENN 34–24
3	:49	VAND	Khari Blasingame 12-yard run (Tommy Openshaw kick)	TENN 34–31
4	12:15	VAND	Darrius Sims 3-yard run (Tommy Openshaw kick)	VAND 38–34
4	4:06	VAND	Ralph Webb 28-yard run (Tommy Openshaw kick)	VAND 45–34

With a potential trip to the Sugar Bowl on the line, Tennessee's defensive issues coupled with the offense's inability to move the ball in the second half cost the team. The Commodores looked better than they had all season offensively with quarterback Kyle Shurmer and running back Ralph Webb leading Vanderbilt to a 45–34 victory. Vanderbilt put up the last three touchdowns of the game to put the game out of reach. The loss put Jones at 2–2 against the Commodores and is considered along with the loss to South Carolina as the turning point in the downward trend for Jones's tenure at Tennessee.

=== No. 24 Nebraska ===
Music City Bowl

Team	1	2	3	4	Total
No. 24 Nebraska	0	7	7	10	24
• Tennessee	0	21	3	14	38

- Location:
  Nashville, Tennessee
- Game start: 3:30 pm
- Elapsed time: 3:44
- Game attendance: 68,496
- Game weather: Temperature: 46 °F (8 °C) • Wind: 5 mph (8.0 km/h) • Weather: Clear
- Referee: M. Mothershed • Umpire: R. Meisenheimer • Linesman: Rod Ammari • Line judge: Dale Keller • Back judge: Justin Nelson • Field judge: John Morton • Side judge: Mike Weselch • Center judge: Mike McCabe
- TV announcers (ESPN): Tom Hart (play-by-play), Andre Ware (color), Cole Cubelic (sidelines)

Scoring summary
2nd	13:20	TENN	28-yard run by John Kelly (Aaron Medley kick)	TENN 7–0
2nd	7:36	TENN	10-yard run by Joshua Dobbs (Aaron Medley kick)	TENN 14–0
2nd	1:36	NEB	38-yard pass to Brandon Reilly from Ryker Fyfe (Drew Brown kick)	TENN 14–7
2nd	0:09	TENN	2-yard run by Joshua Dobbs (Aaron Medley kick)	TENN 21–7
3rd	5:52	TENN	46-yard Field Goal by Aaron Medley	TENN 24–7
3rd	3:26	NEB	9-yard pass to Brandon Reilly from Ryker Fyfe (Drew Brown kick)	TENN 24–14
4th	14:09	TENN	3-yard run by Joshua Dobbs (Aaron Medley kick)	TENN 31–14
4th	12:06	NEB	45-yard Field Goal by Drew Brown	TENN 31–17
4th	10:02	NEB	9-yard run by Ryker Fyfe (Drew Brown kick)	TENN 31–24
4th	8:45	TENN	59-yard pass to Josh Malone from Joshua Dobbs (Aaron Medley kick)	TENN 38–24

To finish off a season that started with excitement and high hopes and closed with four tough losses, Tennessee defeated Nebraska 38–24 in their first meeting since the 2000 Fiesta Bowl. After a scoreless first quarter where both teams had multiple drives stall out with punts, Tennessee jumped out to a 14–0 lead with rushing touchdowns from John Kelly and Joshua Dobbs. The first touchdown drive was mainly from passing the ball and the second was mainly from a balanced rushing attack. Nebraska answered with a 38-yard connection from Ryker Fyfe to Brandon Reilly. Tennessee closed out the second quarter with a Dobbs rushing touchdown from two yards out to go to the half up 21–7. The second half started inconsistent for both teams, with Nebraska fumbling and Tennessee turning the ball over downs on their first series. After a Nebraska punt, Tennessee drove mainly running the ball with two Jauan Jennings receptions to set up successful field goal to go up 24–7. On their next drive, Nebraska scored a touchdown on a drive aided significantly by a Devine Ozigbo 42-yard run that up Reilly's second receiving touchdown from Fyfe. Tennessee's next touchdown drive closed out the third quarter and started the fourth quarter. Tennessee converted three first downs to set up another Dobbs rushing touchdown to make the score 31–14. Nebraska converted a field goal on their next drive, which was set up by big receptions from De'Mornay Pierson-El and Reilly. Tennessee fumbled the ball on their next possession and Nebraska cashed in on a five-play, 31-yard drive that ended with a Fyfe nine-yard touchdown run to make the game 31–24. Tennessee was able to stop the Nebraska scoring run with a four-play, 77-yard drive that was highlighted with a Dobbs-to-Josh Malone 59-yard touchdown reception to make the score 38–24. Nebraska and Tennessee exchanged punts. Nebraska received the ball again and turned the ball over on downs after getting as close as Tennessee's 27-yard line. The drive was stalled by a Fyfe intentional grounding penalty set up by a Jonathan Kongbo sack and Fyfe later being sacked by Derek Barnett. In an effort to run clock, Tennessee ran three times on their next drive and punted. On their last drive, Nebraska turned the ball over downs. Tennessee ran the clock out on their next play to end the game.

Tennessee's three consecutive seasons with a bowl victory marked the first time since the 1994–1996 seasons that the program accomplished the feat. Barnett's fourth quarter sack was the 33rd of this collegiate career, a new school record.

== Team players drafted into the NFL ==
Player	Position	Round	Pick	NFL club
Derek Barnett	Defensive end	1	14	Philadelphia Eagles
Alvin Kamara	Running back	3	67	New Orleans Saints
Cameron Sutton	Defensive back	3	94	Pittsburgh Steelers
Jalen Reeves-Maybin	Linebacker	4	124	Detroit Lions
Josh Malone	Wide receiver	4	128	Cincinnati Bengals
Joshua Dobbs	Quarterback	4	135	Pittsburgh Steelers
