= McVickar =

McVickar is a surname. Notable people with the surname include:

- Harry Whitney McVickar (1860–1905), American artist, illustrator, and real estate investor
- Lansing McVickar (1895–1945), United States Army officer
- William N. McVickar (1843–1910), Episcopal Bishop of Rhode Island

== See also ==
- McVicker
- McVicar
