= Viggers =

Viggers is a surname. Notable people with the surname include:

- Freddie Viggers (born 1951), former senior British Army officer and former Gentleman Usher of the Black Rod
- Peter Viggers (1938–2020), British politician and lawyer

== See also ==
- Vickers (surname)
