= Vicar (disambiguation) =

Vicar typically refers to a clerical position in various Christian traditions.

Vicar or vicarius, may also refer to:

== Political history ==
- Vicar (Roman Empire), an imperial regional governor in the ancient Roman Empire
- Imperial vicar (Holy Roman Empire), an imperial official in the medieval Holy Roman Empire

== People ==
- Vicar (cartoonist) (1934–2012) for the pseudonym of Chilean cartoonist Victor Arriagada Rios
- The Vicar (music producer), pseudonym of David Singleton

== Places ==
- Vícar, a municipality in Almería, Spain
- Vicars, West Virginia, a community in the United States

== Creative works ==
- The Vicar (Thomas & Friends), a character on the television show Thomas & Friends

== See also ==
- Vicker (disambiguation)
- Vickers (disambiguation)
- Wicker (disambiguation)
