= John Vickers (disambiguation) =

John Vickers (born 1958) is a British economist and the Warden of All Souls College, Oxford.

John Vickers or Jon Vickers may also refer to:

- Jack Vickers (1908–1980), English footballer
- John Vickers (abolitionist) (1780–1860), American Quaker, potter, and abolitionist
- John Vickers (criminal) (died 1957), British convict executed for murder
- Jon Vickers (1926–2015), Canadian operatic tenor
- Jon Vickers (rugby union) (born 1988), English rugby union player
- Jon Vickers (trade unionist) (1916–2008), English trade union leader

== See also ==
- John McVicker (1868 – c. 1940), Irish footballer
- Vickers (disambiguation)
