= Trevor Daniel =

Trevor Daniel may refer to:

- Trevor Daniel (American football)
- Trevor Daniel (singer)
