= Vicker =

Vicker may refer to:

- Vicker, Virginia, U.S.A.; an unincorporated community in Montgomery County
- Van Vicker (born 1977), Liberian-Ghanaian actor
- Angus Vicker, pen name of Henry Gregor Felsen (1916–1995) U.S. YA author

== See also ==
- McVicker (surname)
- Vicar (disambiguation)
- Vickers (disambiguation)
