= Wicker (surname) =

Wicker is a surname. Notable people by that name include:

- Alena Analeigh Wicker (born 2008), American medical student and youngest Black person to be accepted to medical school in the United States
- Allan Wicker (born 1941), American psychologist
- Anja Wicker (born 1991), German cross-country skier
- Bob Wicker (1878–1955), American baseball player
- Cassius Milton Wicker (1846–1913), American railroad manager and banker
- Dennis A. Wicker (born 1952), American lawyer and politician from North Carolina
- Floyd Wicker (born 1943), American professional baseball player
- George R. Wicker (1877–1935), American agricultural businessman
- Heinrich Wicker (1921–1945), Nazi military official
- Ireene Wicker (1905–1987), American singer and actress
- John J. Wicker Jr. (1893–1985), American lawyer and politician from Virginia
- Kemp Wicker (1906–1973), American professional baseball player
- Louis Wicker (born 1959), American atmospheric scientist
- Marcus Wicker (born 1984), American poet
- Nancy L. Wicker, American art history professor of art history
- Randy Wicker (born 1938), American author, activist, and blogger
- Roger Wicker (born 1951), American politician from Mississippi
- Tom Wicker (1926–2011), American journalist
- Veronica DiCarlo Wicker (1930–1994), American judge from Louisiana

== See also ==
- Whicker, a similar surname
- Wicker (disambiguation)
