= Michael Vickers =

Michael Vickers may refer to:

- Michael Vickers (bishop) (born 1929), area Bishop of Colchester
- Michael Vickers (artist) (born 1987), Canadian artist
- Michael G. Vickers, (born 1953), American defense official
- Mike Vickers (born 1940), British musician
