= Wicker (disambiguation) =

Wicker is a method of weaving hard, flexible fibres typically used in the construction of baskets and furniture.

Wicker may also refer to:

- Wicker (surname), a surname
- The Wicker, a street in Sheffield, England
  - Sheffield Wicker railway station
- Wicker (novel), 2005 novel by Kevin Guilfoile, also published as Cast of Shadows
- Wicker (film), a 2026 film
- Wicker, Texas, a ghost town in Texas

== See also ==
- Wickr, an encrypted messaging app
- Whicker, a surname
- Vicar (disambiguation)
