= Whicker =

Whicker is a surname. Notable people with the surname include:

- Alan Whicker (1921–2013), British journalist and broadcaster
  - Whicker's World, British television documentary series that ran from 1959 to 1988 that he presented

== Fictional characters ==
- Paul Whicker, fictional comic book vicar from the adult comic Viz

== See also ==
- Wicker (surname)
- Wicker (disambiguation)
