= Joshua Dobbs =

American football player (born 1995)

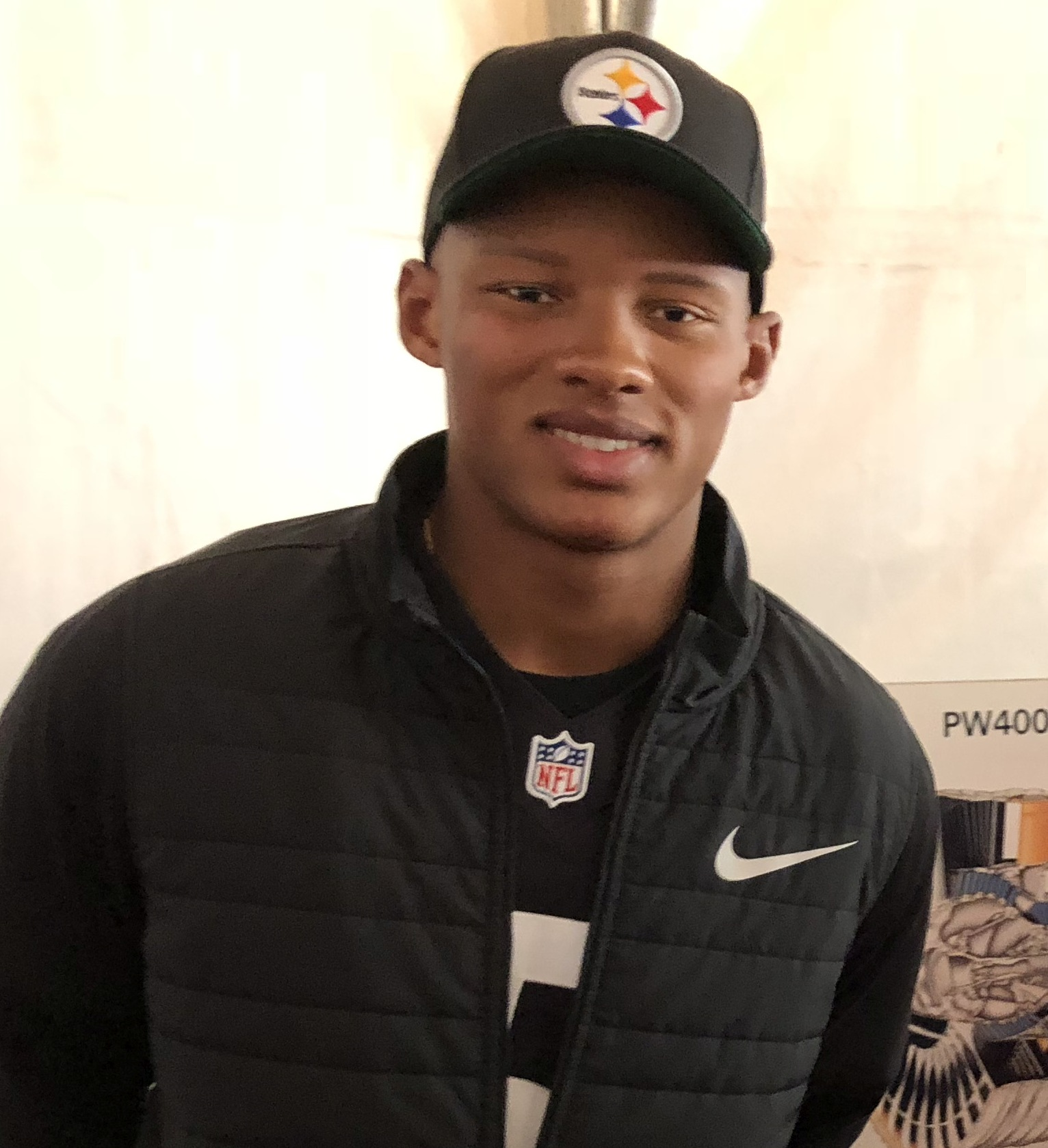
- Dobbs with the Pittsburgh Steelers in 2018

No. 11 – Detroit Lions
- Position: Quarterback
- Roster status: Active

Personal information
- Born: January 26, 1995 (age 31); Alpharetta, Georgia, U.S.
- Listed height: 6 ft 3 in (1.91 m)
- Listed weight: 216 lb (98 kg)

Career information
- High school: Alpharetta
- College: Tennessee (2013–2016)
- NFL draft: 2017: 4th round, 135th overall pick

Career history
- Pittsburgh Steelers (2017–2019); Jacksonville Jaguars (2019); Pittsburgh Steelers (2020–2021); Cleveland Browns (2022); Detroit Lions (2022)*; Tennessee Titans (2022); Cleveland Browns (2023)*; Arizona Cardinals (2023); Minnesota Vikings (2023); San Francisco 49ers (2024); New England Patriots (2025); Detroit Lions (2026–present)
- * Offseason or practice squad member only

Awards and highlights
- President's Award (2016); Second-team All-SEC (2016)

Career NFL statistics as of Week 10, 2026
- Passing attempts: 560
- Passing completions: 352
- Completion percentage: 62.9%
- TD–INT: 17–15
- Passing yards: 3,353
- Passer rating: 78.4
- Rushing yards: 513
- Rushing touchdowns: 8
- Stats at Pro Football Reference

Robert Joshua Dobbs (born January 26, 1995), nicknamed "the Passtronaut", is an American professional football quarterback for the Detroit Lions of the National Football League (NFL). He played college football for the Tennessee Volunteers and was drafted by the Pittsburgh Steelers in the fourth round of the 2017 NFL draft. Dobbs has been a member of nine NFL teams during his career, including as the starter for the Tennessee Titans, Arizona Cardinals, Minnesota Vikings, and San Francisco 49ers. He has also played for the Jacksonville Jaguars and New England Patriots.

== Early life ==
Dobbs was born and raised in Alpharetta, Georgia, the son of Stephanie and Robert Dobbs. His mother retired from United Parcel Service (UPS) as a region manager in corporate human resources, and his father retired as a senior vice president for Wells Fargo. Dobbs has alopecia areata, an autoimmune disease causing hair loss, which began when he was transitioning from elementary to junior high school.

Dobbs started playing football at age five. He attended Wesleyan School and then Alpharetta High School. As a senior with the Alpharetta Raiders football team, Dobbs threw for 3,625 yards with 29 touchdowns and was awarded the Franklin D. Watkins Memorial Trophy as the top African-American high school athlete in the nation by the National Alliance of African American Athletes. He was rated a three-star recruit by Rivals.com and a four-star by Scout.com. Dobbs initially committed to Arizona State University to play college football, but in February 2013, he changed his commitment to the University of Tennessee.

College recruiting
Name	Hometown	School	Height	Weight	Commit date
Joshua Dobbs; QB	Alpharetta, Georgia	Alpharetta High School	6 ft 3 in (1.91 m)	190 lb (86 kg)	Feb 7, 2013
Joshua Dobbs; QB	Recruit ratings: Scout: Rivals:				
Overall recruit ranking:
Note: In many cases, Scout, Rivals, 247Sports, On3, and ESPN may conflict in their listings of height and weight.; In these cases, the average was taken. ESPN grades are on a 100-point scale.; Sources: "2013 Team Ranking". Rivals.com.

== College career ==
=== 2013 season ===
As a true freshman at the University of Tennessee in 2013, Dobbs played in five games with four starts after starter Justin Worley suffered an injury in a loss against the #1 Alabama Crimson Tide at Bryant–Denny Stadium. Dobbs came into the game and completed 5 of 12 passes for 75 yards. He made his first career start against the #10 Missouri Tigers at Faurot Field. Dobbs completed 26-of-42 passes for 240 yards in the 31–3 loss, which was the most passing yards in a freshman debut since 2004 (Erik Ainge (118) and Brent Schaefer (123) against the UNLV Rebels). After a 55–23 loss to the #7 Auburn Tigers and a 14–10 loss to the Vanderbilt Commodores, Dobbs put together a solid performance against the Kentucky Wildcats at Commonwealth Stadium. In the 27–14 victory, Dobbs threw his first two career touchdown passes and had a 40-yard rushing touchdown. Overall, he completed 72-of-121 passes for 695 yards, two touchdowns, and six interceptions while also rushing for 189 yards and a touchdown in his true freshman season.

=== 2014 season ===
Dobbs competed with Worley (a senior) and Nathan Peterman (a sophomore), to be Tennessee's starter for the 2014 season. Worley was announced the starter, but Dobbs took over as the starter in November after Worley was injured in a 34–3 loss to the #3 Ole Miss Rebels at Vaught–Hemingway Stadium. Although Dobbs was not pushed into action immediately after the injury, in the following week against #4 Alabama Crimson Tide, Peterman was named the starter, but he was relieved quickly by Dobbs. Dobbs performed well in the 34–20 defeat by recording 192 passing yards and two rushing touchdowns against the Crimson Tide. Against South Carolina, he had a breakout performance against the Gamecocks at Williams–Brice Stadium. In the 45–42 comeback overtime victory, Dobbs had 301 passing yards and two touchdowns to go along with 166 rushing yards and three touchdowns. Against the Kentucky Wildcats at Neyland Stadium, he had 297 passing yards and three passing touchdowns to go along with 48 rushing yards and a touchdown in the 50–16 victory. Dobbs and team helped Tennessee reach their first bowl game since the 2010 season. He was named the 2015 TaxSlayer Bowl MVP in Tennessee's 45–28 victory over Iowa. In the game, Dobbs passed for 129 yards and a touchdown and rushed for 76 yards and two touchdowns.

As a sophomore, Dobbs threw for 1,206 yards, nine touchdowns, and six interceptions while also rushing for 469 yards and eight touchdowns in just six games. He received two Offensive Player of the Week honors from the Southeastern Conference (SEC), both of which came from his combined passing and rushing performances for over 400 yards in each game.

=== 2015 season ===
Dobbs entered the 2015 season as Tennessee's starting quarterback. He started and appeared in all 12 regular season games and the bowl game. To open Tennessee's season on September 5, Dobbs recorded 205 passing yards, two passing touchdowns, 89 rushing yards, and a rushing touchdown against the Bowling Green Falcons in a 59–30 victory at Nissan Stadium in Nashville, Tennessee. In a double overtime 31–24 loss to the #19 Oklahoma Sooners in the Tennessee 2015 home opener, he had 125 passing yards, a passing touchdown, 12 rushing yards, and a rushing touchdown. In a narrow 28–27 loss to SEC East rival Florida at Ben Hill Griffin Stadium, Dobbs had a season-high 136 rushing yards and had a 58-yard receiving touchdown thrown by teammate wide receiver Jauan Jennings on a trick play. Dobbs's touchdown reception against Florida was the first reception by a Tennessee quarterback since Peyton Manning caught a 10-yard pass from running back Jamal Lewis in 1997 against Arkansas. Against the rival #19 Georgia Bulldogs, Dobbs had a season-high 312 yards passing and three touchdowns to go along with 118 rushing yards and two touchdowns. His efforts in the game led Tennessee to their first win over the Bulldogs since 2009. Against the #8 Alabama Crimson Tide in their annual rivalry game, Dobbs threw for 171 yards and a touchdown in the 19–14 loss at Bryant–Denny Stadium. Against rival South Carolina, he had 255 passing yards and two touchdowns in the 27–24 home victory. Dobbs led Tennessee to a 9–4 record, which was the most wins for the Tennessee program since 2007. The 2015 season culminated with a 45–6 victory over the #12 Northwestern Wildcats in the 2016 Outback Bowl. In the bowl game, Dobbs had two rushing touchdowns.

=== 2016 season ===
Dobbs entered the 2016 season as Tennessee's starting quarterback in his final season of collegiate eligibility. He started and appeared in all 12 regular season games and the bowl game. Dobbs started the season with a solid performance in a home game against Appalachian State. In the 20–13 overtime victory, he had 192 yards passing but fumbled on the goal line; the ball was recovered by teammate and running back Jalen Hurd to give Tennessee the go-ahead score. In the 2016 Pilot Flying J Battle at Bristol, Dobbs threw three passing touchdowns to go along with two rushing touchdowns. In a 38–28 comeback victory over the #19 Florida Gators, Dobbs had 319 yards passing, four passing touchdowns, 80 rushing yards, and a rushing touchdown to lead the Volunteers to their first win over the Gators since 2004. Against #25 Georgia, Dobbs had 230 yards passing, three passing touchdowns, and a rushing touchdown to win 34–31. Dobbs's last touchdown was a Hail Mary throw to wide receiver Jauan Jennings as time expired. The winning play is referenced by many as the "Dobbs-Nail Boot". With the victory, Tennessee was 5–0 with Dobbs as quarterback and ranked as high as top 10 in some polls. In a double overtime 45–38 loss to the #8 Texas A&M Aggies at Kyle Field, Dobbs had a season-high 398 passing yards and one passing touchdown. He also caught a receiving touchdown from Jauan Jennings, his second career receiving touchdown. Dobbs continued solid performances over the rest of the season: he had five total touchdowns, 223 passing yards, and 190 rushing yards in a 63–37 victory over Missouri and 340 passing yards in a 45–34 loss against Vanderbilt at Vanderbilt Stadium. Despite his play, Tennessee faded from their 5–0 start to finish 8–4.

In the final game of his Tennessee career, Dobbs led the Volunteers past the #24 Nebraska Cornhuskers by a score of 38–28 in the 2016 Music City Bowl at Nissan Stadium in Nashville. He had 291 passing yards, one passing touchdown, 11 rushes for 118 yards, and three rushing touchdowns. Dobbs was named the MVP of the game.

Dobbs led Tennessee to a second consecutive 9–4 record. The Touchdown Club of Columbus honored him with the President's Award, which honors athletes from smaller programs whose dedication and perseverance—often in the face of adversity—deserve greater recognition. Tennessee's 18 wins with Dobbs at the helm were the most for the school over a two-year span since 2006–2007.

Dobbs majored in aerospace engineering during his time at the University of Tennessee. The university presented him with the 2017 Torchbearer Award, the highest honor for an undergraduate student, which recognizes accomplishments in the community and academics. Dobbs was heralded as possessing a perfect 4.0 grade point average and being named to the SEC Academic Honor Roll.

Dobbs was inducted into Omicron Delta Kappa at Tennessee in 2016.

== Professional career ==
=== Pre-draft ===
Dobbs received an invitation to the Senior Bowl and was named the starting quarterback for the South. He finished the game completing 12-of-15 pass attempts for 102 passing yards and an interception, as the South narrowly defeated the North 16–15. Most NFL draft experts and analysts projected Dobbs to be a fourth to fifth-round pick. NFL analyst Mike Mayock projected him to be selected in the second round and NFL.com projected Dobbs to be drafted in the third round. After attending the NFL Scouting Combine, he was ranked the seventh best quarterback in the draft by ESPN, the ninth best quarterback by Sports Illustrated, and NFLDraftScout.com ranked him the eighth best quarterback in the draft. Dobbs attended Tennessee's Pro Day and scripted his own set of plays; 19 other teammates also participated in Tennessee's Pro Day. He held workouts for six teams: the Kansas City Chiefs, Tennessee Titans, Carolina Panthers, San Diego Chargers, Pittsburgh Steelers, and New Orleans Saints.

Pre-draft measurables
Height	Weight	Arm length	Hand span	Wingspan	40-yard dash	10-yard split	20-yard split	20-yard shuttle	Three-cone drill	Vertical jump	Broad jump	Wonderlic
6 ft 3 3/8 in (1.91 m)	216 lb (98 kg)	32 5/8 in (0.83 m)	9 1/4 in (0.23 m)	6 ft 6 1/4 in (1.99 m)	4.64 s	1.56 s	2.69 s	4.31 s	6.75 s	33.0 in (0.84 m)	10 ft 2 in (3.10 m)	29
All values from 2017 NFL Combine.

=== Pittsburgh Steelers (first stint) ===
The Steelers selected Dobbs in the fourth round (135th overall) of the 2017 NFL draft. He was the seventh quarterback selected, and the Steelers also drafted his former Tennessee and Senior Bowl teammate, cornerback Cameron Sutton. Dobbs replaced Zach Mettenberger following the draft.

On May 22, 2017, the Steelers signed Dobbs to a four-year, $2.95 million contract with a signing bonus of $554,295. He was named the starter for the preseason opener against the New York Giants. After two starts and four appearances during the preseason, Dobbs spent his entire rookie season behind incumbent starter Ben Roethlisberger and long-term backup Landry Jones.

Dobbs made his NFL debut in the 2018 season against the Atlanta Falcons in Week 5, taking a knee to close out the 41–17 victory. On November 4, 2018, in a 23–16 victory over the Baltimore Ravens, Dobbs completed a 22-yard pass to JuJu Smith-Schuster, after stepping in for Ben Roethlisberger, who got injured on the previous play. In Week 14 against the Oakland Raiders, Dobbs once again stepped in for Roethlisberger, who suffered a rib injury. He finished 4-of-9 for 24 yards and an interception during the 24–21 road loss.

Dobbs finished the 2018 season with 43 passing yards and an interception in five games and no starts.

=== Jacksonville Jaguars ===
On September 9, 2019, Dobbs was traded to the Jacksonville Jaguars for a fifth-round pick in the 2020 NFL draft. Dobbs was traded after Mason Rudolph won the backup job for the Steelers, and Jaguars quarterback Nick Foles sustained a broken clavicle during the season opener and was placed on injured reserve.

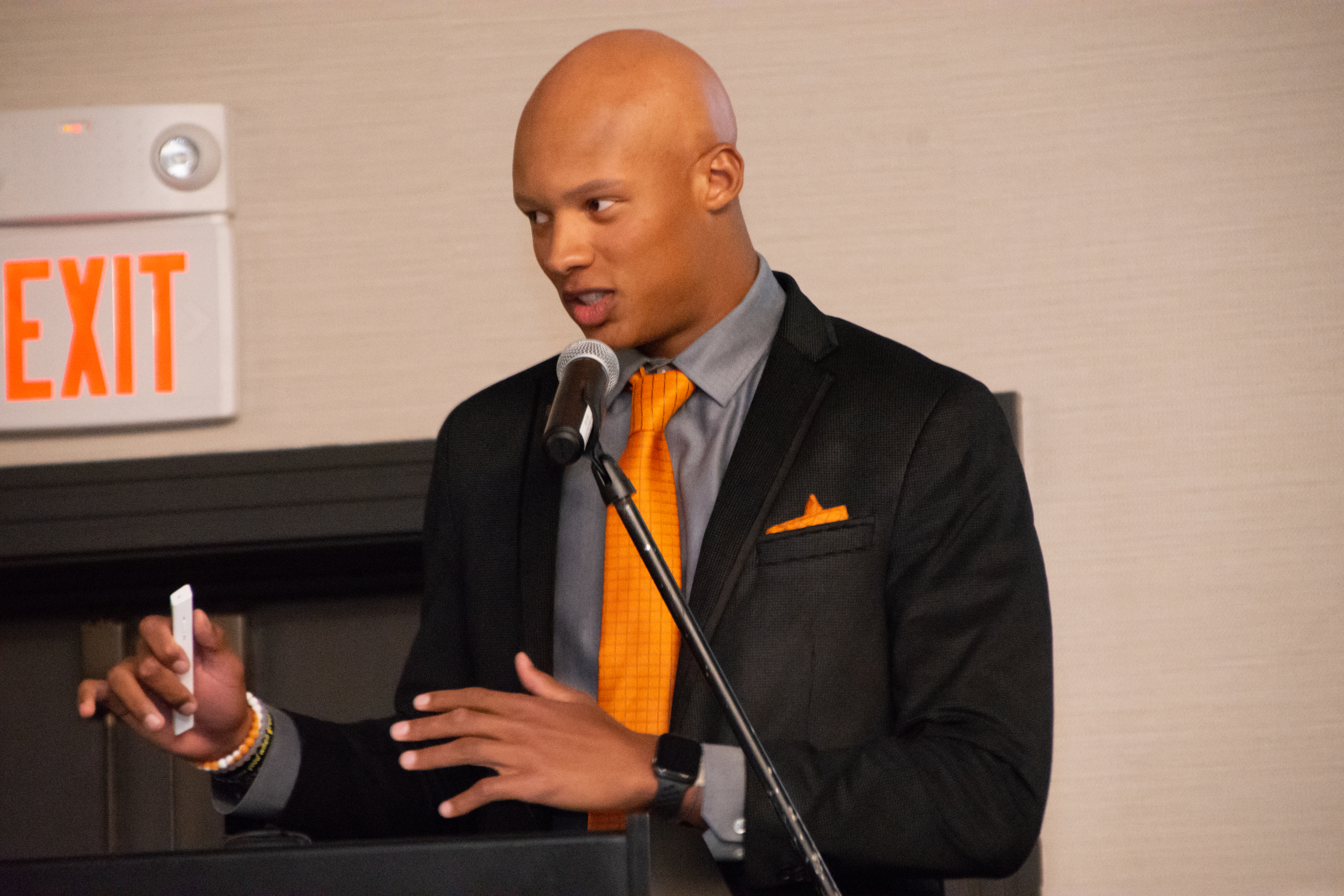
Dobbs in 2020

While in Jacksonville, Dobbs participated in an internship at NASA's Kennedy Space Center.

On September 5, 2020, Dobbs was waived by the Jaguars.

=== Pittsburgh Steelers (second stint) ===
On September 6, 2020, Dobbs was claimed off waivers by the Steelers. He only appeared in one game during the 2020 season.

Dobbs re-signed with the Steelers on a one-year contract on April 19, 2021. He was placed on injured reserve on August 31.

=== Cleveland Browns (first stint) ===
On April 9, 2022, Dobbs signed a one-year, $1 million deal with the Cleveland Browns. He was waived on November 28 after Deshaun Watson returned from suspension.

=== Detroit Lions (first stint) ===
On December 5, 2022, Dobbs was signed to the practice squad of the Detroit Lions.

=== Tennessee Titans ===
On December 21, 2022, Dobbs was signed by the Titans off the Lions' practice squad.

On December 29, with Ryan Tannehill out for the season with an injury and rookie Malik Willis underperforming, Dobbs was named the starter for the Week 17 matchup against the Dallas Cowboys. In his first NFL start, Dobbs completed 20-of-39 passes for 232 yards, his first career touchdown pass, and an interception during the 27–13 loss.

On January 2, head coach Mike Vrabel announced that Dobbs would start the Week 18 matchup against the Jaguars. Needing a win to clinch the division, Dobbs completed 20-of-29 passes for 179 yards, a touchdown, and an interception. Despite leading for most of the game, he was sacked from behind by Jaguars safety Rayshawn Jenkins and fumbled the ball, with the Jaguars returning it 37 yards for the go-ahead touchdown with under three minutes to go. The Titans lost on the road 20–16, ultimately costing them a playoff spot.

=== Cleveland Browns (second stint) ===
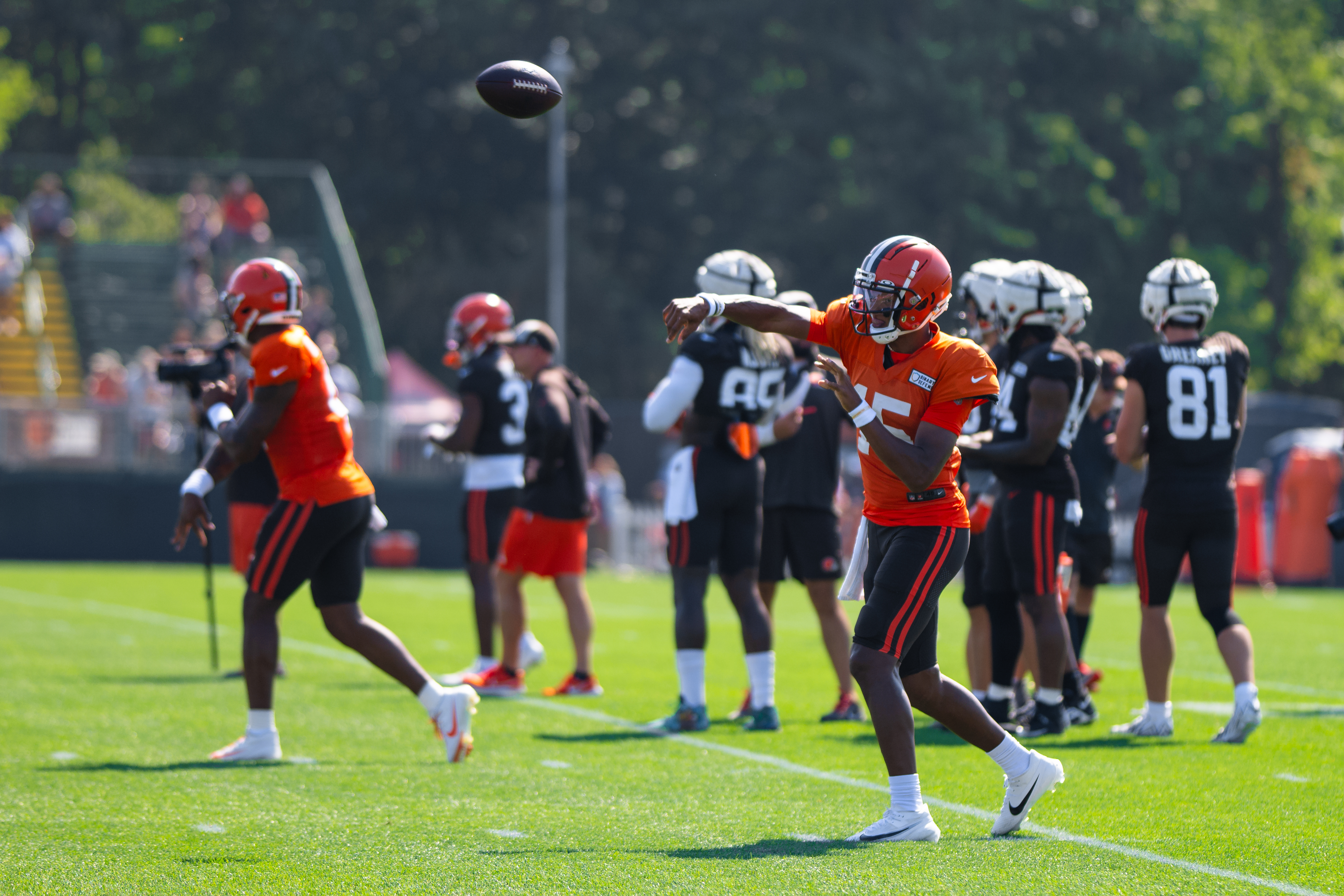
Dobbs (#15) in 2023

On March 23, 2023, Dobbs re-signed with the Browns.

=== Arizona Cardinals ===
During the 2023 preseason, on August 24, Dobbs was traded to the Arizona Cardinals along with a seventh-round pick in the 2024 NFL draft, in exchange for a fifth-round pick in the 2024 Draft. He entered the 2023 NFL season as the starting quarterback for the Cardinals, as Kyler Murray started the season on injured reserve.

On September 24, Dobbs led the Cardinals to their first win of the season in an upset over the Cowboys 28–16. At the time, the Cowboys were undefeated at 2–0. This would be Cardinals' only win with Dobbs as starter, going 1–7 through eight games before he was traded to the Vikings. Dobbs finished his Cardinals tenure with 1,569 passing yards, eight touchdowns, and five interceptions to go along with 258 rushing yards and three touchdowns.

=== Minnesota Vikings ===
After the Minnesota Vikings' starting quarterback Kirk Cousins suffered a season-ending Achilles injury, the Cardinals traded Dobbs, along with a conditional seventh-round pick, to the Vikings for a sixth-round pick on October 31.

On November 5 against the Falcons, Dobbs entered the game after new starting quarterback Jaren Hall left the game with a concussion. Dobbs had not taken a single practice repetition for the Vikings and had to rehearse his cadence with the team's offensive linemen during the game. Dobbs threw for 158 yards and scored three total touchdowns in the 31–28 comeback victory. He became the first quarterback in NFL history to record three touchdowns in consecutive games while playing for different teams and earned NFC Player of the Week honors for his performance. Dobbs during this time received increased media attention for his journeyman career and sudden unexpected success. His nickname "the Passtronaut," referring to Dobbs' background in aerospace engineering, first appeared in October 2023 and gained prominence during this period.

After losses to the Denver Broncos and the Chicago Bears, Dobbs was benched in the second half of the Week 14 matchup against the Las Vegas Raiders after completing 10-of-23 passes for 63 yards and scoring no points for Minnesota through three quarters. After backup quarterback Nick Mullens led the Vikings to a game-winning drive in the fourth quarter, which resulted in a 3–0 victory, the team announced that Mullens would be the starter moving forward, and Dobbs was relegated to backup. He was later demoted to the third-string quarterback after head coach Kevin O'Connell announced that Jaren Hall would be the backup behind Mullens.

=== San Francisco 49ers ===
On March 19, 2024, Dobbs signed a one-year contract with the San Francisco 49ers.

Dobbs spent most of the season as the third-string quarterback behind Brock Purdy and Brandon Allen. He saw his first snaps of the season in Week 17 against the Detroit Lions after Purdy left late in the fourth quarter with an injury. Dobbs threw for 35 yards and ran for a seven-yard touchdown as the 49ers lost 40–34. With Purdy sidelined and the 49ers eliminated from playoff contention, Dobbs started the season finale against the Cardinals. He threw for 326 yards, two touchdowns, and two interceptions and rushed for 17 yards and a touchdown in the 47–24 road loss.

=== New England Patriots ===
On March 18, 2025, Dobbs signed a two-year, $8 million contract with the New England Patriots, his ninth NFL team, to serve as the backup behind Drake Maye.

On March 23, 2026, Dobbs was released by the Patriots.

=== Detroit Lions (second stint) ===
On August 9, 2026, Dobbs signed a one-year contract worth $1.425 million with $475,000 fully guaranteed with the Detroit Lions, reuniting with Dan Campbell following the retirement of Teddy Bridgewater.

== Career statistics ==
Legend
	Led the league
**Bold**	Career high

=== NFL ===
Year	Team	Games			Passing									Rushing					Fumbles	
Year	Team	GP	GS	Record	Cmp	Att	Pct	Yds	Y/A	Lng	TD	Int	Rtg	Att	Yds	Avg	Lng	TD	Fum	Lost
2017	PIT	DNP																		
2018	PIT	5	0	—	6	12	50.0	43	3.6	22	0	1	24.0	4	11	2.8	10	0	0	0
2019	JAX	DNP																		
2020	PIT	1	0	—	4	5	**80.0**	2	0.4	3	0	0	79.2	2	20	**10.0**	13	0	0	0
2021	PIT	Did not play due to injury																		
2022	CLE	DNP																		
2022	TEN	2	2	0–2	40	68	58.8	411	6.0	39	2	2	73.8	8	44	5.5	11	0	4	2
2023	ARI	8	8	1–7	**167**	**266**	62.8	**1,569**	5.9	**69**	**8**	**5**	81.2	**47**	**258**	5.5	**44**	**3**	**8**	**4**
2023	MIN	5	4	**2–2**	95	151	62.9	895	5.9	29	5	**5**	76.4	30	163	5.4	22	**3**	6	3
2024	SF	2	1	0–1	32	47	68.1	361	**7.7**	36	2	2	87.3	9	24	2.7	8	2	2	1
2025	NE	4	0	0–0	7	10	70.0	65	6.5	23	0	0	**87.5**	10	-5	-0.5	2	0	0	0
2026	DET	2	0	0–0	1	1	100.0	7	7.0	7	0	0	95.8	3	2	-0.7	0	0	0	0
Career		29	15	3–12	352	560	62.9	3,353	6.0	69	17	15	78.4	113	513	4.5	44	8	20	10

=== College ===
Year	Team	Games			Passing								Rushing			
Year	Team	GP	GS	Record	Cmp	Att	Pct	Yds	Y/A	TD	Int	Rtg	Att	Yds	Avg	TD
2013	Tennessee	5	4	1–3	72	121	59.5	695	5.7	2	6	103.3	38	189	5.0	1
2014	Tennessee	6	5	4–1	112	177	**63.3**	1,206	6.8	9	6	130.5	104	469	4.5	8
2015	Tennessee	13	13	**9–4**	205	344	59.6	2,291	6.7	15	5	127.0	146	671	4.6	11
2016	Tennessee	13	13	**9–4**	**225**	**357**	63.0	**2,946**	**8.3**	**27**	**12**	**150.6**	**150**	**831**	**5.5**	**12**
Career		37	35	23–12	614	999	61.5	7,138	7.1	53	29	133.2	438	2,160	4.9	32

== Personal life ==
Dobbs is a Christian. He has spoken about the most important day in his life being the day he was baptized while in high school.

Dobbs is the founder of the ASTROrdinary Dobbs Foundation.

Dobbs is an advocate for awareness about alopecia, a hair loss condition that personally affects him.

Dobbs's cousin, Parker Washington, is a wide receiver for the Jaguars. Another cousin, Tyler Tolbert, is a professional baseball player for the Kansas City Royals.

As a longtime backup quarterback in the NFL, Dobbs appeared in a Progressive Insurance ad campaign featuring other such players.

In 2024, Dobbs obtained his private pilot license. As of 2026, he was working on his instrument rating.
