= Vickers (disambiguation) =

Vickers is a famous name in British engineering that existed through many companies starting in 1826.

Vickers may also refer to:

== People ==
- Vickers (surname)
- Baroness Vickers, a life peerage awarded to Joan Vickers, Baroness Vickers (1907–1994)

== Companies ==
- Vickers Aircraft Company, a New Zealand aircraft manufacturer unrelated to the British conglomerate
- Vickers Limited (1828–1927), a British engineering conglomerate
  - Canadian Vickers (1911–1944), a Canadian subsidiary of Vickers Limited
  - Vickers-Armstrongs (1927–1977), engineering conglomerate arising from the merger of Vickers Limited with Sir W G Armstrong Whitworth & Company
    - Vickers plc (1977–1999), including Vickers Defence Systems, the defence arm of Vickers plc, sold by Rolls-Royce plc to Alvis plc in 2002
    - Vickers Shipbuilding and Engineering (1871-2007), the former shipbuilding and armaments division of Vickers Armstrongs
- Vickers Petroleum (1918–1980), an American petroleum company unrelated to the British conglomerate

== Places ==
- Vickers Nunatak, Ross Dependency, Antarctica, a massive nunatak (glacial island)
- Vickers, a community in the township of West Grey, Ontario, Canada

== Other uses ==
- Vickers Aircraft Wave, a two seated amphibious aircraft
- Vickers hardness test, popular method for measuring the hardness of materials
- Vickers machine gun, produced by Vickers Limited

== See also ==
- Vicker (disambiguation)
- Vicar (disambiguation)
