= Charles Vickers =

Charles Vickers may refer to:

- Charles Geoffrey Vickers, (1894–1982) English soldier, lawyer, administrator, writer, systems scientist and recipient of the Victoria Cross
- Charles Vickers (footballer) (1891–1917), Scottish footballer

== See also ==
- Charlie Vickers, Australian actor
