= Corey Vereen =

American football player (born 1995)

No. 50, 98
- Position: Defensive end

Personal information
- Born: June 15, 1995 (age 31); Winter Garden, Florida
- Listed height: 6 ft 2 in (1.88 m)
- Listed weight: 249 lb (113 kg)

Career information
- High school: West Orange High School
- College: Tennessee
- NFL draft: 2017: undrafted

Career history
- New England Patriots (2017)*; Memphis Express (2019)
- * Offseason or practice squad member only
- Stats at Pro Football Reference

Corey Allen Vereen (born June 15, 1995) is an American former football defensive end. He played college football at Tennessee.

== Early life ==
Vereen attended and played high school football at West Orange High School in Winter Garden, Florida.

== College career ==
Vereen attended and played college football at Tennessee from 2013–2016 under head coach Butch Jones. As a freshman, he had 13 total tackles, one sack, and one pass defensed in the 2013 season. As a sophomore, he had 23 total tackles, 1.5 sacks, and one fumble recovery (which came against Alabama). As a junior, he had 39 total tackles, 3.5 sacks, and one pass defensed. As a senior, he had 36 total tackles, seven sacks, three pass defensed, and two fumble recoveries. One of his fumble recoveries was a touchdown after quarterback Jacob Eason was hit by Derek Barnett in the endzone in the game against Georgia.

== Professional career ==
Vereen went undrafted in the 2017 NFL draft. He was signed by the New England Patriots on May 5, 2017. On June 5, he was cut from the team and placed on injured reserve with an undisclosed injury the following day. On September 4, he was removed from IR and cut once again.

On August 1, 2018, Vereen was signed by the Memphis Express of the Alliance of American Football. The league ceased operations in April 2019. During the eight games he played in, Vereen recorded ten tackles, six quarterback hits, two forced fumbles, and four sacks; Vereen was the team leader in sacks.

On October 15, 2019, Vereen was drafted in the eighth round during phase three in the 2020 XFL draft by the Los Angeles Wildcats. However, on October 24, agent Logan Brown announced he would not join the league as its base salary was lower than reported.
