= Vicars, West Virginia =

Unincorporated community in West Virginia, US

Coordinates: 38°39′23″N 81°30′05″W

Vicars is an unincorporated community in Roane County, in the U.S. state of West Virginia.

== History ==
A post office called Vicars was in operation between 1904 and 1972. W. L. Vicars, an early postmaster, gave the community his name.
