= Stanley Vickers =

Stanley Vickers is the name of:

- Stan Vickers (1932–2013), British race walker
- Stanley Vickers (MP) (1837–1872), British member of parliament for Wallingford 1868–1862
