= Steve Vickers =

Steve Vickers is the name of:

- Steve Vickers (ice hockey) (born 1951), Canadian former ice hockey player
- Steve Vickers (footballer) (born 1967), English former central defender
- Steve Vickers (computer scientist) (born 1953), lecturer and ROM file engineer of the ZX Spectrum
