= McVicar =

McVicar or MacVicar is a surname. Notable people with the surname include:

McVicar:

- Colin McVicar (1916–1987), New Zealand cricketer
- David McVicar (born 1967), Scottish opera and theatre director
- Ewan McVicar, Scottish dance music producer and disc jockey
- Hannah McVicar, British illustrator and printmaker
- Jack McVicar (1903–1952), Canadian professional ice hockey player
- Jekka McVicar, English organic gardening expert
- John McVicar (1940–2022), British journalist, formerly an armed robber
- Neil McVicar (minister) (1672–1747), minister
- Neil McVicar (politician), Canadian politician
- Nelson McVicar (1871–1960), American federal judge
- Rob McVicar (born 1982), Canadian professional ice hockey player
- Stuart McVicar (1918–1990), New Zealand cricketer

MacVicar:

- Angus MacVicar (1908–2001), Scottish author
- Margaret MacVicar (1944–1991), American physicist and educator
- Sheila MacVicar, Canadian television journalist

Macvicar:

- Anne Macvicar Grant (1755–1838), American-Scottish author

== See also ==
- McVicar (film), a 1980 British drama film
- McVicar (album), the soundtrack album for the above film
- McVicar's Bus Services, a defunct bus company in Sydney, Australia
- McVicker (surname)
