= Michael Vickers (artist) =

- Born: August 11, 1987 (age 39)
- Known for: Sculptor, Painter

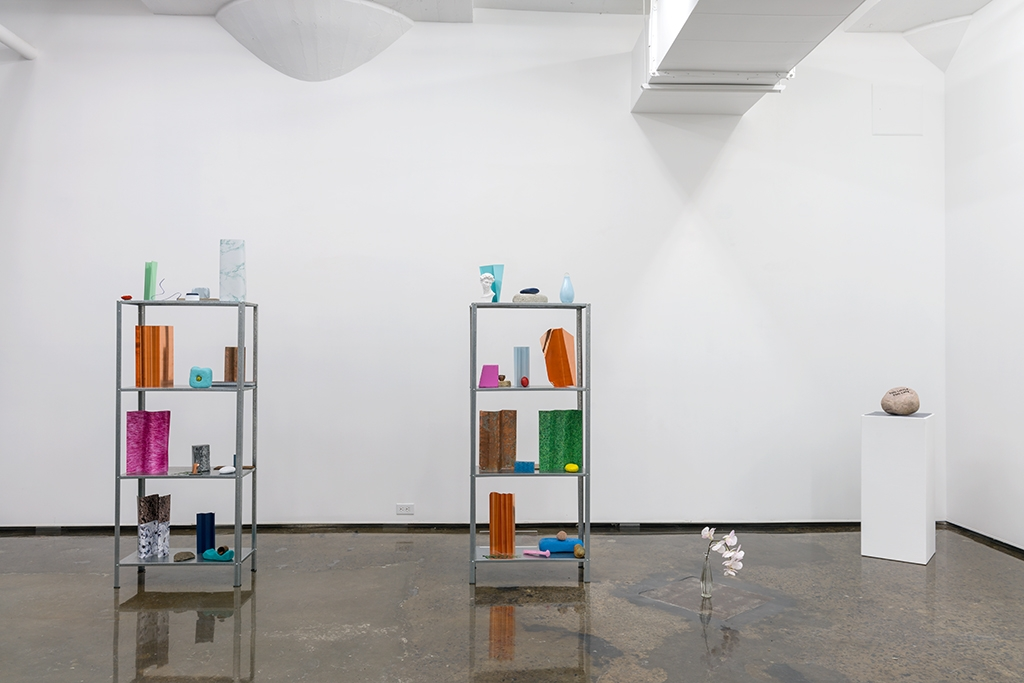
Installation view of Monument, 2017 by Michael Vickers

Michael Vickers (born August 11, 1987) is a Canadian visual artist based in Toronto, Ontario who works primarily in sculpture, painting, and installation. He completed a master's degree in art history from the University of Toronto in 2013. Vickers is also co-director of the arts organization Akin, which provides affordable shared studio spaces for artists in Toronto, and professional and creative development opportunities through a range of programming initiatives.

== Career ==
Vickers has exhibited his work locally in Canada at Mercer Union, Division Gallery, the Art Gallery of Ontario, the Gardiner Museum, and Art Toronto and the Artist Project. His work has been shown internationally at Volta Basel, Clark House Mumbai and Dutch Design Week.
