= Charles Vickers (footballer) =

Scottish footballer

Personal information
- Full name: Charles Thomas Vickers
- Date of birth: 12 February 1891
- Place of birth: Hutchesontown, Scotland
- Date of death: 21 June 1917 (aged 26)
- Place of death: Lozinghem, France
- Position: Outside left

Youth career
- Kilsyth Emmet

Senior career*
Years	Team	Apps	(Gls)
1913–1915	Kilmarnock	16	(1)
1915–1916	Renton		
- * Club domestic league appearances and goals

Charles Thomas Vickers (12 February 1891 – 21 June 1917) was a Scottish professional football outside left who played in the Scottish League for Kilmarnock.

== Personal life ==
Vickers served as a gunner in the Royal Field Artillery during the First World War and died of wounds at 23rd Casualty Clearing Station, Lozinghem on 21 June 1917. He was buried in Lapugnoy Military Cemetery.

== Career statistics ==
Appearances and goals by club, season and competition
Club	Season	League			Scottish Cup		Total	
Club	Season	Division	Apps	Goals	Apps	Goals	Apps	Goals
Kilmarnock	1913–14	Scottish First Division	7	0	0	0	7	0
Kilmarnock	1914–15	Scottish First Division	9	1	0	0	9	1
Career total			16	1	0	0	16	1
