= McVicker =

McVicker is a surname of Scottish origin. Notable people with the surname include:

- Dana McVicker (born 1963), American country singer
- Daphne Alloway McVicker (1895–1979), American writer
- J. McVicker Hunt (1906–1991), American educational psychologist and author
- John McVicker (1868–c. 1940), Irish footballer
- Mitch McVicker, American Christian music singer-songwriter
- Norman McVicker (1940–2008), English cricketer
- Roy H. McVicker (1924–1973), American politician

== Fictional ==
- Principal McVicker, an antagonist on Beavis and Butt-Head

== See also ==
- John McVickers (born 1868), Irish soccer footballer
- McVicker's Theater (1857–1984), playhouse in Chicago, IL, U.S.A.
- Vickers (surname)
- McVicar (surname)
