= John McVicker =

Irish footballer

Personal information
- Full name: John McVicker
- Date of birth: 29 April 1868
- Place of birth: Belfast, Ireland
- Date of death: c. 1940 (aged 71–72)
- Place of death: Macclesfield, England
- Positions: Right-back; centre-forward

Senior career*
Years	Team	Apps	(Gls)
1883–1888	Glentoran		
1888	Linfield		
1889	Small Heath		
1889–1891	Glentoran		
1891	Birmingham St George's		
1891–1892	Accrington	19	(0)
1892–1894	Ardwick	26	(0)
1894–1897	Macclesfield Town	32	(1)

International career
1888–1889	Ireland	2	(0)
- * Club domestic league appearances and goals

John McVicker (29 April 1868 – c. 1940) was an Irish footballer who played in the Football League for Accrington and Ardwick. He also represented the Ireland national team.
