= Trevor Daniel (American football) =

American football player (born 1994)

No. 8, 12
- Position: Punter

Personal information
- Born: December 8, 1994 (age 31); Dickson, Tennessee, U.S.
- Listed height: 6 ft 1 in (1.85 m)
- Listed weight: 231 lb (105 kg)

Career information
- High school: Dickson County (TN)
- College: Tennessee
- NFL draft: 2018: undrafted

Career history
- Houston Texans (2018–2019); Denver Broncos (2020)*; Tennessee Titans (2020)
- * Offseason or practice squad member only

Career NFL statistics
- Punts: 89
- Punting yards: 3,873
- Average punt: 43.5
- Inside 20: 38
- Career long: 61
- Stats at Pro Football Reference

Trevor Lyn Daniel (born December 8, 1994) is an American former professional football player who was a punter in the National Football League (NFL). He played college football for the Tennessee Volunteers and signed with the Houston Texans as an undrafted free agent in 2018. Daniel was also a member of the Denver Broncos and Tennessee Titans.

== Early life ==
Daniel was raised in Dickson, Tennessee. He watched Tennessee Volunteer football games with his grandfather, leading to his desire as a child to play for them.

== College career ==
Daniel was a punter for the Tennessee Volunteers in college. In the 2015 season, Daniel executed a punt late in the rivalry game against Georgia that helped set up the Vols' first victory over the Bulldogs in several years. The punt went out of bounds on the Bulldogs' half-yard line. In his four years with the Volunteers, Daniel's average punting average was fifth in the nation.

Daniel was the Ray Guy Punter of the Week in early September 2017. He finished the 2017 season ranked second nationally with a 95.99 GPR Punt Rating.

== Professional career ==
Pre-draft measurables
Height	Weight	Arm length	Hand span	40-yard dash	10-yard split	20-yard split	Vertical jump	Broad jump	Bench press
6 ft 1 1/2 in (1.87 m)	230 lb (104 kg)	31 1/2 in (0.80 m)	9 3/8 in (0.24 m)	4.98 s	1.69 s	2.90 s	32.5 in (0.83 m)	9 ft 11 in (3.02 m)	23 reps
All values from NFL Combine

=== Houston Texans ===
Daniel was signed by the Houston Texans as an undrafted free agent in 2018. He won the punting job in 2018, beating out 18-year NFL veteran Shane Lechler. Daniel made his NFL debut in the Texans' season opener against the New England Patriots, punting six times for 230 net yards in the 27–20 loss. In the 2018 season, Daniel had 74 punts for 3,237 net yards for a 43.74 average.

On September 17, 2019, Daniel was waived by the Texans.

=== Denver Broncos ===
On December 31, 2019, Daniel signed a reserve/future contract with the Denver Broncos. He was waived on April 23, 2020.

=== Tennessee Titans ===
On November 7, 2020, Daniel was signed to the Tennessee Titans practice squad. He was elevated to the active roster five days later for the team's Week 10 matchup against the Indianapolis Colts and was reverted to the practice squad after the game. Daniel was promoted to the active roster on November 19. He was waived by the Titans on November 24, but was re-signed to the practice squad two days later. Daniel was placed on the practice squad/COVID-19 list by the team on December 8, but was restored to the practice squad on December 19. His practice squad contract with the team expired after the season on January 18, 2021.
