= Kendal Vickers =

American football player (born 1995)

Profile
- Position: Defensive tackle

Personal information
- Born: May 23, 1995 (age 31); Havelock, North Carolina, U.S.
- Listed height: 6 ft 3 in (1.91 m)
- Listed weight: 295 lb (134 kg)

Career information
- High school: Havelock (NC)
- College: Tennessee (2013–2017)
- NFL draft: 2018: undrafted

Career history
- Pittsburgh Steelers (2018)*; Tennessee Titans (2018)*; Edmonton Eskimos (2019); Las Vegas Raiders (2020–2022); Buffalo Bills (2022–2023); Arizona Cardinals (2023)*; New Orleans Saints (2024)
- * Offseason or practice squad member only

Career NFL statistics
- Total tackles: 10
- Sacks: 2
- Stats at Pro Football Reference

Career CFL statistics
- Tackles: 12
- Sacks: 2
- Forced fumbles: 1
- Stats at CFL.ca

Kendal Bryant Vickers (born May 3, 1995) is an American professional football defensive tackle. He has previously played in the National Football League (NFL) for the Las Vegas Raiders, Buffalo Bills, and New Orleans Saints, and in the Canadian Football League (CFL) for the Edmonton Eskimos. He played college football at Tennessee.

== Early life ==
Vickers played high school football at Havelock High School.

== College career ==
Vickers played at the University of Tennessee from 2013–2017 under head coach Butch Jones.

== Professional career ==
Pre-draft measurables
Height	Weight	Arm length	Hand span	40-yard dash	10-yard split	20-yard split	20-yard shuttle	Three-cone drill	Vertical jump	Broad jump	Bench press
6 ft 2 3/4 in (1.90 m)	290 lb (132 kg)	34 1/4 in (0.87 m)	10 1/4 in (0.26 m)	5.02 s	1.70 s	2.87 s	4.65 s	7.56 s	30.0 in (0.76 m)	9 ft 4 in (2.84 m)	16 reps
All values from Pro Day

=== Pittsburgh Steelers ===
Vickers was signed by the Pittsburgh Steelers as an undrafted free agent on April 28, 2018. He was waived on August 31, 2018, as part of final roster cuts.

=== Tennessee Titans ===
Vickers was signed by the Tennessee Titans to their practice squad on December 24, 2018, but was released on January 7, 2019.

=== Edmonton Eskimos ===
Vickers was signed by the Edmonton Eskimos of the Canadian Football League (CFL) on May 19, 2019. He recorded 12 tackles with two sacks during the season. Vickers was released by Edmonton on January 20, 2020, to allow him to pursue NFL opportunities.

=== Las Vegas Raiders ===
Vickers signed a reserve/futures contract with the Las Vegas Raiders on January 22, 2020. He made the Raiders' 53-man roster out of training camp. Vickers made his NFL debut on September 13, 2020, against the Carolina Panthers, playing nine snaps on defense and one snap on special teams in the Week 1 victory. He was placed on the reserve/COVID-19 list by the team on November 18, and activated three days later. In Week 15 against the Los Angeles Chargers on Thursday Night Football, Vickers recorded his first career sack on Justin Herbert during the 30–27 overtime loss.

Vickers signed a one-year contract extension with the Raiders on March 2, 2021. He was waived on August 31, 2021, and re-signed to the practice squad the next day. He was promoted to the active roster on November 10.

On December 6, 2022, Vickers was released by the Raiders.

=== Buffalo Bills ===
On December 8, 2022, Vickers was signed to the Buffalo Bills practice squad. He was released on December 21. He signed a reserve/future contract on January 9, 2023.

On August 29, 2023, Vickers was waived by the Bills and re-signed to the practice squad. Vickers was elevated from the practice squad for the Week 5 game against the Jacksonville Jaguars, where he made two tackles in 46 snaps in his Bills debut. On October 31, the Bills released him.

=== Arizona Cardinals ===
On November 2, 2023, Vickers was signed to the Arizona Cardinals practice squad. He was not signed to a reserve/future contract after the season, and thus became a free agent upon the expiration of his practice squad contract.

=== New Orleans Saints ===
On May 13, 2024, Vickers signed a one-year contract with the New Orleans Saints. He was released on August 28, and re-signed to the practice squad. Vickers played in one game for the Saints before he was released on December 18.
