= Trevor Siemian =

American football player (born 1991)

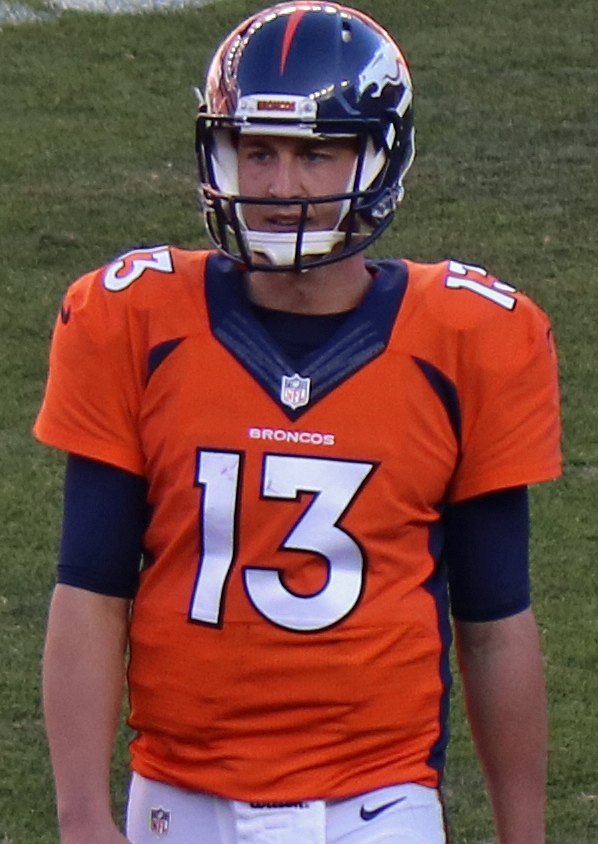
- Siemian with the Denver Broncos in 2016

Profile
- Position: Quarterback

Personal information
- Born: December 26, 1991 (age 34); Danbury, Connecticut, U.S.
- Listed height: 6 ft 3 in (1.91 m)
- Listed weight: 220 lb (100 kg)

Career information
- High school: Olympia (Orlando, Florida)
- College: Northwestern (2010–2014)
- NFL draft: 2015: 7th round, 250th overall pick

Career history
- Denver Broncos (2015–2017); Minnesota Vikings (2018); New York Jets (2019); Tennessee Titans (2020)*; New Orleans Saints (2020–2021); Chicago Bears (2022); Cincinnati Bengals (2023)*; New York Jets (2023); Tennessee Titans (2024–2025); Atlanta Falcons (2026)*
- * Offseason or practice squad member only

Awards and highlights
- Super Bowl champion (50)

Career NFL statistics as of 2025
- Passing attempts: 1,208
- Passing completions: 707
- Completion percentage: 58.5%
- TD–INT: 44–32
- Passing yards: 7,751
- Passer rating: 78.7
- Stats at Pro Football Reference

Trevor John Siemian (born December 26, 1991) is an American professional football quarterback. He played college football for the Northwestern Wildcats and was selected by the Denver Broncos in the seventh round of the 2015 NFL draft. Siemian was part of the Broncos when they won Super Bowl 50, serving as the third-string quarterback behind starter Peyton Manning and backup Brock Osweiler. He has also been a member of the Minnesota Vikings, New York Jets, Tennessee Titans, New Orleans Saints, Chicago Bears, and Cincinnati Bengals.

== Early life ==
Trevor Siemian was born on December 26, 1991, in Danbury, Connecticut to Walter and Colleen Siemian. He attended Olympia High School in Orlando, Florida. On the football team, Siemian threw for an Orange County record of 6,144 career yards and 53 touchdowns as quarterback for three seasons with the Titans. He was also an outstanding baseball shortstop, third baseman, and outfielder, and was voted Mr. Olympia by his classmates during his senior year. Siemian graduated with a 3.9 grade point average and was named to the National Honor Society.

Siemian chose to attend Northwestern University.

== College career ==
At Northwestern University, Siemian majored in communication studies and was awarded Academic All-Big Ten Conference honors in 2013 and 2014. He redshirted during his freshman year of college in 2010.

In 2011, Siemian was a backup quarterback to main starter Dan Persa. He played in eight games, the first against Eastern Illinois. Siemian completed 16 of 26 passes for 256 yards and three touchdowns for the year.

In the 2012 season, Siemian earned a majority of the quarterback reps while Kain Colter saw occasional playing time. In the season-opener against Syracuse, Siemian led the team on a 75-yard game-winning drive after being down by six with 2:40 to play. Against Vanderbilt, he led back-to-back go-ahead drives in the fourth quarter, including a key 34-yard completion on a third-and-15 play. Siemian made his first career start in a game against Indiana, throwing for 308 yards on 22-of-32 passing in a 44–29 victory. Siemian led #21 Northwestern to a 34–20 TaxSlayer.com Gator Bowl victory versus Mississippi State, where he led two touchdown drives and scored his first career rushing touchdown.

In 2013, Siemian played in all 12 games and made his second and third career starts, while playing behind "wildcat" quarterback Kain Colter. Against Illinois, Siemian passed for 414 yards, which was the 10th-highest total by a Northwestern quarterback. He threw a career-high 46 times against Minnesota, completing 25. Against Ohio State, Siemian made a career-long pass of 67 yards. Facing Syracuse, he threw a career-high three touchdown passes. Against California, Siemian rushed for a career-high 21 yards. The Wildcats finished with a 5–7 record and missed out on a bowl game. For the year, Siemian threw for 2,149 yards, 11 touchdowns, and nine interceptions. He ranked sixth in the Big Ten for completion percentage (59.7), seventh for yards per completion (12.07), and ninth in total offense (181.8).

In 2014, Siemian started the first 11 games before suffering a torn ACL at Purdue on November 22. Against Notre Dame, he passed for a season-high 284 yards and ran for a career-high 32 yards in a 43–40 overtime victory. Against both Michigan and Minnesota, Siemian posted a career high in completions (32). Facing Penn State, he ran for a career-high three touchdowns. Against California, Siemian threw a 54-yard touchdown and caught a 17-yard touchdown pass. The Wildcats once again finished with a 5–7 record and missed out on a bowl game. For the year, Siemian rushed for five touchdowns and passed for 2,214 yards, seven touchdowns, and 11 interceptions. His passing yards rank him just outside of the top 10 in Northwestern single-season history.

Although he started only 14 career games, Siemian completed college ranked fourth all-time at Northwestern in career passing yardage (5,931), fourth in completions (550), sixth in offensive yards (5,908), and seventh in passing touchdowns (27).

== Professional career ==
Pre-draft measurables
Height	Weight	Arm length	Hand span	Wingspan	40-yard dash
6 ft 2 7/8 in (1.90 m)	220 lb (100 kg)	30 5/8 in (0.78 m)	9 7/8 in (0.25 m)	6 ft 4 1/4 in (1.94 m)	4.94 s
All values from Pro Day

=== Denver Broncos ===
==== 2015 season ====
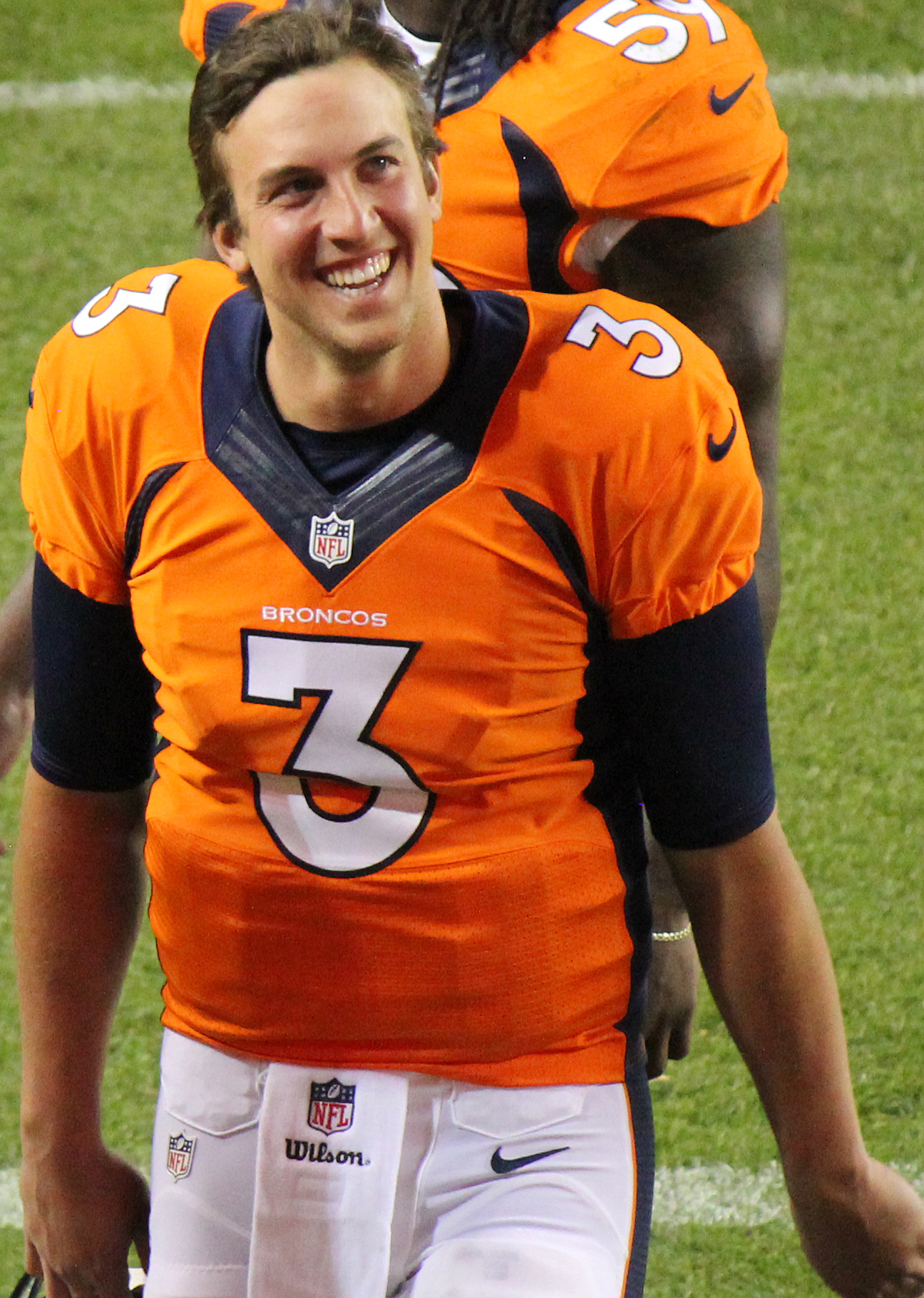
Siemian in 2015

Siemian was rated the 22nd best quarterback in the 2015 NFL draft by NFLDraftScout.com. Anticipating that he would not be drafted, Siemian lined up a commercial real estate job in Chicago. However, he was selected in the seventh round (250th overall) of the 2015 NFL draft by the Denver Broncos. Siemian was the seventh and final quarterback to be taken in the draft.

Siemian made his NFL debut in Week 15 against the Pittsburgh Steelers, taking a knee to close out the first half of the 34–27 road loss. On February 7, 2016, Siemian was part of the Broncos team that won Super Bowl 50 over the Carolina Panthers by a score of 24–10. He was inactive for the game.

==== 2016 season ====
Following Peyton Manning's retirement and Brock Osweiler signing with the Houston Texans in free agency, a competition for the Broncos starting quarterback job between Siemian, veteran Mark Sanchez, and rookie Paxton Lynch opened up. On August 29, Broncos head coach Gary Kubiak named Siemian the starting quarterback.

During the narrow season-opening 21–20 victory over the Panthers, which was a rematch of Super Bowl 50, Siemian completed 18-of-26 passes for 178 yards, a touchdown, and two interceptions in his first NFL start. He was the first quarterback in NFL history to start the season opener for the defending Super Bowl champion without having thrown an NFL pass. Siemian was also the first Northwestern quarterback since Randy Dean in 1979 to start an NFL game. In the next game against the Indianapolis Colts, Siemian threw for 266 yards during a 34–20 victory over the Indianapolis Colts; 215 of those yards came in the first half. The following week against the Cincinnati Bengals, he became the first quarterback in NFL history to throw 300 yards and complete four touchdowns with no interceptions in his first career road start in the 29–17 victory. Siemian's 132.1 quarterback rating was the highest achieved in the league that week. He was named the AFC Offensive Player of the Week for his performance against the Bengals. The following week at the Tampa Bay Buccaneers, Sieman began 5-of-7 for 68 yards and an 11-yard touchdown pass to Demaryius Thomas before exiting the game with a left shoulder injury after getting thrown to the turf on a sack by Clinton McDonald. Rookie Paxton Lynch would play the remainder of the game, as the Broncos defeated Tampa Bay 27–7 and Siemian secured an undefeated record through his first four career starts. Siemian was subsequently diagnosed with a sprained AC joint and would miss the team's next game, a home loss to the eventual NFC champion Atlanta Falcons.

During Week 12 in a Sunday Night Football game against the Kansas City Chiefs, Siemian threw three touchdowns with no interceptions on 20-of-34 pass attempts for 368 yards. Although the Broncos ultimately lost 30–27 in overtime, he achieved a quarterback rating of 125.6, the second-best of his career to date when playing in the majority of a game.

From Weeks 8 to 14, Siemian was one of only three quarterbacks who averaged over 300 passing yards per game (the other two were Tom Brady and Kirk Cousins). By Week 16, he averaged 300.2 passing yards in his previous six games.

Although the Broncos finished the season with a 9–7 record and missed the playoffs, Siemian compiled an 18-10 touchdown-to-interception ratio and an 84.6 passer rating. On both measures, Siemian significantly outperformed the Broncos' Peyton Manning-Brock Osweiler quarterback duo of 2015. On January 23, 2017, he was named as an alternate for the 2017 Pro Bowl, but declined the invitation due to recovery from left shoulder surgery two weeks prior.

==== 2017 season ====
Going into the 2017 season, Siemian had a new head coach in Vance Joseph. Siemian and the Broncos opened the season against the Los Angeles Chargers on Monday Night Football. Siemian completed 17-of-28 passes for 219 yards, two touchdowns, and one interception as well as his first career rushing touchdown. The Broncos took a 24–7 lead, but two costly turnovers helped the Chargers make the score 24–21. However, Broncos' defensive end Shelby Harris blocked the Chargers' attempt at a game-tying field goal from Younghoe Koo, securing the Broncos' win. The following week, Siemian and the Broncos hosted the Dallas Cowboys, led by 2016 Offensive Rookie of the Year Dak Prescott and 2016 leading rusher Ezekiel Elliott. The Broncos' defense shut down Dallas' offense and Siemian went 22-of-32 for 231 yards, a career-high-tying four touchdowns, and an interception as the Broncos blew out the Cowboys 42–17. For his performance, Siemian was voted the NFL's Clutch Performer of the week and the FedEx Air Player of the week.

During Week 6 against the New York Giants on NBC Sunday Night Football, Siemian briefly left the game with a left shoulder injury near the end of the second quarter. He came back in the game in the third quarter, but two interceptions and a fumble still proved to be costly. The Broncos lost 23–10, despite Siemian having a career-high 376 passing yards.

After a Week 8 29–19 loss to the Chiefs where Siemian threw three interceptions, it was announced that Osweiler would start the team's Week 9 game against the Philadelphia Eagles in place of Siemian.

During Week 12 against the Oakland Raiders, Siemian entered the game in the third quarter in relief of an injured Paxton Lynch. Trailing 21–0, Siemian attempted to rally the Broncos to a win, but they lost on the road 21–14. Siemian completed 11-of-21 passes for 149 yards and two touchdowns. The following day, it was announced that Lynch would miss 2–4 weeks due to his injury, making Siemian the starter.

During Week 15 on Thursday Night Football against the Colts, Siemian suffered a shoulder injury in the first quarter of the 25–13 road victory and did not return to the game. He was placed on injured reserve on December 15.

=== Minnesota Vikings ===
On March 19, 2018, Siemian, along with a 2018 seventh-round draft pick, was traded to the Minnesota Vikings in exchange for a 2019 fifth-round draft pick. He saw no playing time backing up Kirk Cousins in the 2018 season.

=== New York Jets (first stint) ===
On March 20, 2019, Siemian signed a one-year, $2 million deal with the New York Jets.

On September 12, quarterback Sam Darnold was ruled out indefinitely with mononucleosis, and Siemian was named the starter against the Cleveland Browns on Monday Night Football in Week 2. Siemian suffered an ankle injury on a late hit by Myles Garrett and left the game after completing 3-of-6 passes for three yards, being replaced by third-string quarterback Luke Falk. The next day, it was revealed that there were torn ligaments in Siemian's ankle, prematurely ending his season.

After becoming a free agent in March 2020, Siemian had a tryout with the Detroit Lions on August 14, 2020.

=== Tennessee Titans (first stint) ===
On August 19, 2020, Siemian was signed by the Tennessee Titans as backup to starter Ryan Tannehill on a one-year deal. Siemian was released on September 5, but was re-signed to the practice squad the next day.

=== New Orleans Saints ===
==== 2020 season ====
On November 20, 2020, the New Orleans Saints signed Siemian to their active roster off the Titans' practice squad after an injury to starting quarterback Drew Brees. The Saints waived Siemian on December 19, and signed him to their practice squad three days later. On January 18, 2021, Siemian signed a reserve/futures contract with the Saints.

==== 2021 season ====
Siemian was released by the Saints on August 31, but was re-signed six days later.

Siemian made his Saints debut during Week 8 against the Tampa Bay Buccaneers after starter Jameis Winston left the game with a torn ACL. Siemian threw for 159 yards and a touchdown, leading the Saints to a 36–27 victory.

Siemian was named the starter for the next game against the Atlanta Falcons over Taysom Hill, who had recently cleared concussion protocol. Siemian was named the team's starter for the subsequent four games, all of which resulted in Saints' losses. Following this stretch, he was benched in favor of Hill.

Siemian finished the 2021 season with 1,154 passing yards, 11 touchdowns, and three interceptions for a 57.4% completion percentage and a career-high 88.4 passer rating in six games and four starts.

=== Chicago Bears ===
On March 29, 2022, Siemian signed a two-year contract with the Chicago Bears.

Siemian made his Bears debut during a Week 8 49–29 road loss to the Cowboys, completing a lone pass attempt for five yards. After Justin Fields suffered an injury in Week 11, Siemian was given his first start as a Bear in Week 12 against the Jets. During pre-game warmups, Siemian suffered an oblique injury. The Bears initially announced their third-string quarterback, Nathan Peterman, would start the game, but Siemian still made the start. He finished the 31–10 loss completing 14-of-25 pass attempts for 179 yards, a touchdown, and an interception.

On December 3, Siemian was placed on injured reserve to undergo season-ending surgery to repair his oblique injury.

Siemian was released on March 16, 2023, after the Bears signed P. J. Walker.

=== Cincinnati Bengals ===
On May 3, 2023, Siemian signed with the Cincinnati Bengals after Brandon Allen chose not to re-sign with the team. Siemian competed with Jake Browning to be the Bengals' backup quarterback throughout training camp, with Browning eventually winning the job after the third preseason game. Siemian was released on August 29.

=== New York Jets (second stint) ===
On September 26, 2023, the Jets signed Siemian to their practice squad. Siemian was signed to the active roster on November 21. He made his season debut in the fourth quarter of a Week 13 matchup against the Atlanta Falcons after Tim Boyle was benched. Siemian completed 5-of-13 pass attempts for 66 yards and fumbled thrice as the Jets lost 13–8. On December 5, Boyle was released, and Siemian became the primary backup behind Zach Wilson two days later.

During a Week 15 30–0 shutout road loss to the Miami Dolphins, Siemian relieved Wilson after he suffered a concussion in the second quarter. He completed 14-of-26 passes for 110 yards and two interceptions. Siemian started the following week against the Washington Commanders after Wilson did not clear concussion protocol. He completed 27-of-49 passes for 217 yards, a touchdown, and an interception during the narrow 30–28 victory, marking his first win as a starter since 2017.

Siemian finished the season as the starter after Wilson continued not to clear concussion protocol. In the regular-season finale against the New England Patriots, Siemian completed 8-of-20 passes for 70 yards, beating the Patriots on the road 17–3; this ended the Jets' eight-year, 15-game losing streak against the Patriots.

=== Tennessee Titans (second stint) ===
On October 9, 2024, the Tennessee Titans signed Siemian to their practice squad. He was promoted to the active roster on October 19, moved back to the practice squad on October 21, promoted to the active roster again on October 26, moved back to the practice squad again on October 28, and promoted to the active roster for the third time on November 2, where he spent the remainder of the season.

On August 11, 2025, Siemian re-signed with the Titans. On August 26, he was released by the Titans as part of final roster cuts, but was re-signed to the practice squad the next day.

=== Atlanta Falcons ===
On March 26, 2026, Siemian signed with the Atlanta Falcons. On July 29, he was released by the Falcons with a non-football injury.

== Career statistics ==
Legend
	Won the Super Bowl
**Bold**	Career high

=== NFL ===
Year	Team	Games			Passing									Rushing					Sacks		Fumbles	
Year	Team	GP	GS	Record	Cmp	Att	Pct	Yds	Y/A	Lng	TD	Int	Rtg	Att	Yds	Avg	Lng	TD	Sck	SckY	Fum	Lost
2015	DEN	1	0	—	0	0	0.0	0	0.0	0	0	0	0.0	1	−1	−1.0	−1	0	0	0	0	0
2016	DEN	14	14	8−6	**289**	**486**	**59.5**	**3,401**	7.0	**76**	**18**	10	84.6	28	57	2.0	14	0	31	187	4	2
2017	DEN	11	10	5−5	206	349	59.0	2,285	6.5	44	12	**14**	73.3	**31**	**127**	**4.1**	15	**1**	**33**	**220**	**5**	2
2018	MIN	0	0	—	DNP																	
2019	NYJ	1	1	0−1	3	6	50.0	3	0.5	3	0	0	56.2	0	0	0.0	0	0	2	17	0	0
2020	NO	0	0	—	DNP																	
2021	NO	6	4	0−4	108	188	57.4	1,154	6.1	46	11	3	**88.4**	9	20	2.2	**17**	**1**	9	64	3	1
2022	CHI	2	1	0−1	15	26	57.7	184	**7.1**	33	1	1	76.4	4	8	2.0	6	0	2	14	0	0
2023	NYJ	5	3	**2−1**	86	153	56.2	724	4.7	30	2	4	62.1	11	40	3.6	13	0	8	40	**5**	**3**
2024	TEN	0	0	—	DNP																	
2025	TEN	0	0	—	DNP																	
Career		40	33	15−18	707	1,208	58.5	7,751	6.4	76	44	32	78.7	84	251	3.0	17	2	85	542	17	8

=== College ===
Season	Team	Passing								Rushing			
Season	Team	Cmp	Att	Pct	Yds	Avg	TD	Int	Rtg	Att	Yds	Avg	TD
2010	Northwestern	Redshirt											
2011	Northwestern	16	26	**61.5**	256	**9.8**	3	1	**174.6**	5	19	**3.8**	0
2012	Northwestern	128	218	58.7	1,312	6.0	6	3	115.6	21	**48**	2.3	1
2013	Northwestern	178	298	59.7	2,149	7.2	**11**	9	126.4	48	33	0.7	0
2014	Northwestern	**228**	**392**	58.2	**2,214**	5.6	7	**11**	105.9	**68**	-123	-1.8	**5**
Career		550	934	58.9	5,931	6.4	27	24	116.6	142	-23	-0.2	6
