= 2013 Big Ten Conference football season =

- League: NCAA Division I FBS (Football Bowl Subdivision)
- Sport: Football
- Duration: August 30, 2013 through January 2014
- Teams: 12
- TV partner(s): ABC, ESPN2, ESPN Inc., Big Ten Network, FOX (championship game)

2014 NFL Draft
- Top draft pick: Taylor Lewan (Michigan)
- Picked by: Tennessee Titans, 11th overall

Regular Season
- Season MVP: Braxton Miller
- Top scorer: Braxton Miller
- Leaders Division champions: Ohio State
- Legends Division champions: Michigan State

Championship Game
- Champions: Michigan State
- Runners-up: Ohio State
- Finals MVP: Connor Cook

Football seasons
- 2012 2014

2013 Big Ten Conference football standings
	Conf.			Overall
Team	W		L	W		L
Legends Division
No. 3 Michigan State x$	8	–	0	13	–	1
Iowa	5	–	3	8	–	5
Nebraska	5	–	3	9	–	4
Minnesota	4	–	4	8	–	5
Michigan	3	–	5	7	–	6
Northwestern	1	–	7	5	–	7
Leaders Division
No. 12 Ohio State x%	8	–	0	12	–	2
No. 22 Wisconsin	6	–	2	9	–	4
Penn State*	4	–	4	7	–	5
Indiana	3	–	5	5	–	7
Illinois	1	–	7	4	–	8
Purdue	0	–	8	1	–	11
Championship: Michigan State 34, Ohio State 24
$ – BCS representative as conference champion; % – BCS at-large representative; x – Division champion/co-champions; Penn State ineligible for conference championship game and post-season bowl games due to NCAA sanctions; Rankings from AP Poll

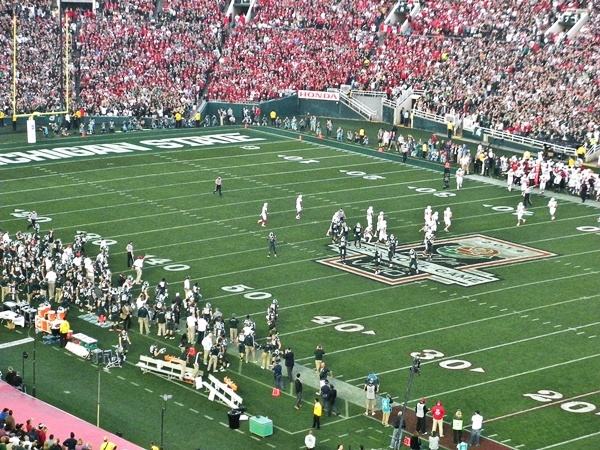
Michigan State defeated Stanford in the Rose Bowl Game on January 1, 2014

The 2013 Big Ten Conference football season was the 118th season for the Big Ten. The conference began its season on Thursday, August 29, as Minnesota and Indiana began their 2013 season of NCAA Division I FBS (Football Bowl Subdivision) competition. Michigan State began their season the following day, and the rest of the conference began their season on September 1.

This was the league's final season as a 12-team conference before Maryland and Rutgers join the Big Ten Conference for the 2014 season. It was also the final season with the "Leaders" and "Legends" divisions; when Maryland and Rutgers join, the conference will reorganize its divisions on a pure geographic basis. The six schools in the Central Time Zone will be joined by Purdue in the new West Division, with the other schools making up the East Division. Under the new setup, the only protected cross-division rivalry game will be Indiana–Purdue.

Michigan State upset undefeated Ohio State to win the Big Ten Championship Game. The B1G put seven teams into bowl games, including two into the BCS with Michigan State going to the Rose Bowl and Ohio State to the Orange Bowl. The B1G went 2-5 in bowl games with the only wins coming from Michigan State in the Rose Bowl and Nebraska in the Gator Bowl.

== Rankings ==
		Pre	Wk 2	Wk 3	Wk 4	Wk 5	Wk 6	Wk 7	Wk 8	Wk 9	Wk 10	Wk 11	Wk 12	Wk 13	Wk 14	Wk 15	Wk 16	Final
Illinois	AP			RV														
Illinois	C			RV														
Illinois	Harris	Not released																
Illinois	BCS	Not released																
Indiana	AP																	
Indiana	C																	
Indiana	Harris	Not released																
Indiana	BCS	Not released																
Iowa	AP															RV	RV	RV
Iowa	C						RV				RV					RV	RV	
Iowa	Harris	Not released														RV	RV	
Iowa	BCS	Not released																
Michigan	AP	17	17	11	15	18	19	18	RV	24	23	RV						
Michigan	C	17	17	12	14	18	17	16	24	23	21	RV						
Michigan	Harris	Not released							24	22	21	RV		RV	RV			
Michigan	BCS	Not released								22	21							
Michigan State	AP	RV	RV	RV	RV	RV	RV	RV	RV	RV	24	18	14	13	11	10	4	3
Michigan State	C	RV	RV	RV	24	RV	RV	RV	RV	RV	24	19	16	13	11	9	4	3
Michigan State	Harris	Not released							RV	RV	23	18	15	13	11	10	4	
Michigan State	BCS	Not released									22	17	16	13	11	10	4	
Minnesota	AP										RV	RV	RV	RV	RV	RV	RV	
Minnesota	C					RV					RV	RV	25	23	RV	RV	RV	
Minnesota	Harris	Not released									RV	RV	RV	25	RV	RV	RV	
Minnesota	BCS	Not released												25				
Nebraska	AP	18	22	23	RV	RV	RV	RV	RV	25			RV	RV	RV		RV	RV
Nebraska	C	18	19	15	RV	RV	25	24	21	21	RV	RV	RV	RV	RV			25
Nebraska	Harris	Not released							23	23	RV	RV	RV	RV	RV			
Nebraska	BCS	Not released								24								
Northwestern	AP	22	19	17	18	17	16	19	RV									
Northwestern	C	22	20	16	16	16	15	18	RV									
Northwestern	Harris	Not released							RV									
Northwestern	BCS	Not released																
Ohio State	AP	2	3	4	4	4	4	4	4	4	4	4	3	4	3	2	7	12
Ohio State	C	2	2	3	3	3	3	3	3	4	4	4	3	3	3	2	6	10
Ohio State	Harris	Not released							4	4	4	4	3	3	3	2	7	
Ohio State	BCS	Not released								4	4	4	3	3	3	2	7	
Penn State	AP	RV	RV	RV														
Penn State	C	Ineligible for ranking																
Penn State	Harris	Not released							Ineligible for ranking									
Penn State	BCS	Not released								Ineligible for ranking								
Purdue	AP																	
Purdue	C																	
Purdue	Harris	Not released																
Purdue	BCS	Not released																
Wisconsin	AP	23	21	20	24	23	RV	RV	25	22	22	21	17	16	14	21	19	22
Wisconsin	C	23	21	18	RV	24	RV	RV	RV	24	23	22	20	17	14	21	19	21
Wisconsin	Harris	Not released							RV	24	24	22	21	19	15	21	19	
Wisconsin	BCS	Not released									24	24	22	19	15	21	19	

Legend
	Improvement in ranking
	Drop in ranking
	Not ranked previous week
	No change in ranking from previous week
RV	Received votes but were not ranked in Top 25 of poll

== Spring games ==
April 6

- Nebraska

April 12

- Illinois

April 13

- Indiana
- Michigan
- Northwestern
- Ohio State * at Paul Brown Stadium in Cincinnati
- Purdue

April 20

- Michigan State
- Penn State
- Wisconsin

April 27

- Iowa
- Minnesota
- Wisconsin

== Schedule ==
Index to colors and formatting
Big Ten member won
Big Ten member lost
Big Ten teams in **bold**

All times Eastern time.

† denotes Homecoming game

=== Week 1 ===
Date	Time	Visiting team	Home team	Site	TV	Result	Attendance	Ref.
August 29	7:00 p.m.	Indiana State	**Indiana**	Memorial Stadium • Bloomington, IN	BTN	**W** 73–35	40,278	
August 29	7:00 p.m.	UNLV	**Minnesota**	TCF Bank Stadium • Minneapolis, MN	BTN	**W** 51–23	44,217	
August 30	8:00 p.m.	Western Michigan	**Michigan State**	Spartan Stadium • East Lansing, MI	BTN	**W** 26–13	71,214	
August 31	12:00 p.m.	Southern Illinois	**Illinois**	Memorial Stadium • Champaign, IL	BTN	**W** 42–34	42,175	
August 31	12:00 p.m.	Buffalo	No. 2 **Ohio State**	Ohio Stadium • Columbus, OH	ESPN2	**W** 40–20	103,980	
August 31	12:00 p.m.	**Purdue**	Cincinnati	Nippert Stadium • Cincinnati, OH	ESPNU	**L** 42–7	36,007	
August 31	12:00 p.m.	Massachusetts	No. 23 **Wisconsin**	Camp Randall Stadium • Madison, WI	BTN	**W** 45–0	76,306	
August 31	3:30 p.m.	Northern Illinois	**Iowa**	Kinnick Stadium • Iowa City, IA	BTN	**L** 30–27	67,402	
August 31	3:30 p.m.	Central Michigan	No. 17 **Michigan**	Michigan Stadium • Ann Arbor, MI	BTN	**W** 59–9	112,618	
August 31	3:30 p.m.	**Penn State**	Syracuse	MetLife Stadium • East Rutherford, NJ	ABC / ESPN2	**W** 23–17	61,202	
August 31	8:00 p.m.	Wyoming	No. 18 **Nebraska**	Memorial Stadium • Lincoln, NE	BTN	**W** 37–34	91,185	
August 31	10:30 p.m.	No. 22 **Northwestern**	California	California Memorial Stadium • Berkeley, CA	ESPN2	**W** 44–30	58,816	
^{#}Rankings from AP Poll released prior to game. All times are in Eastern Time.

=== Week 2 ===
Date	Time	Visiting team	Home team	Site	TV	Result	Attendance	Ref.
September 7	12:00 p.m.	Cincinnati	**Illinois**	Memorial Stadium • Champaign, IL	ESPN2	**W** 45–17	43,031	
September 7	12:00 p.m.	Missouri State	**Iowa**	Kinnick Stadium • Iowa City, IA	BTN	**W** 28–14	64,201	
September 7	12:00 p.m.	South Florida	**Michigan State**	Spartan Stadium • East Lansing, MI	ESPNU	**W** 21–6	70,401	
September 7	12:00 p.m.	Eastern Michigan	**Penn State**	Beaver Stadium • University Park, PA	BTN	**W** 45–7	92,863	
September 7	12:00 p.m.	Indiana State	**Purdue**	Ross–Ade Stadium • West Lafayette, IN	BTN	**W** 20–14	50,165	
September 7	12:00 p.m.	Tennessee Tech	No. 21 **Wisconsin**	Camp Randall Stadium • Madison, WI	BTN	**W** 48–0	77,785	
September 7	3:30 p.m.	San Diego State	No. 3 **Ohio State**	Ohio Stadium • Columbus, OH	ABC / ESPN2	**W** 42–7	104,984	
September 7	6:00 p.m.	Navy	**Indiana**	Memorial Stadium • Bloomington, IN	BTN	**L** 35–41	47,013	
September 7	6:00 p.m.	Southern Mississippi	No. 22 **Nebraska**	Memorial Stadium • Lincoln, NE	BTN	**W** 56–13	90,466	
September 7	6:00 p.m.	Syracuse	No. 19 **Northwestern**	Ryan Field • Evanston, IL	BTN	**W** 48–27	38,033	
September 7	8:00 p.m.	No. 14 Notre Dame	No. 17 **Michigan**	Michigan Stadium • Ann Arbor, MI	ESPN	**W** 41–30	115,109	
September 7	8:00 p.m.	**Minnesota**	New Mexico State	Aggie Memorial Stadium • Las Cruces, NM	BTN2GO	**W** 44–21	16,418	
^{#}Rankings from AP Poll released prior to game. All times are in Eastern Time.

=== Week 3 ===
Date	Time	Visiting team	Home team	Site	TV	Result	Attendance	Ref.
September 14	12:00 p.m.	Bowling Green	**Indiana**	Memorial Stadium • Bloomington, IN	ESPNU	**W** 42–10	41,869	
September 14	12:00 p.m.	Akron	No. 11 **Michigan**	Michigan Stadium • Ann Arbor, MI	BTN	**W** 28–24	107,120	
September 14	12:00 p.m.	Western Illinois	**Minnesota**	TCF Bank Stadium • Minneapolis, MN	BTN	**W** 29–12	42,127	
September 14	12:00 p.m.	No. 16 UCLA	No. 23 **Nebraska**	Memorial Stadium • Lincoln, NE	ABC	**L** 41–21	91,471	
September 14	2:00 p.m.	Youngstown State	**Michigan State**	Spartan Stadium • East Lansing, MI	BTN	**W** 55–17	71,626	
September 14	6:00 p.m.	No. 19 Washington	**Illinois**	Soldier Field • Chicago, IL	BTN	**L** 34–24	47,312	
September 14	6:00 p.m.	**Iowa**	Iowa State	Jack Trice Stadium • Ames, IA (Iowa Corn Cy-Hawk Series)	FS1	**W** 27–21	56,800	
September 14	6:00 p.m.	Central Florida	**Penn State**	Beaver Stadium • University Park, PA	BTN	**L** 34–31	92,855	
September 14	7:00 p.m.	No. 4 **Ohio State**	California	California Memorial Stadium • Berkeley, CA	FOX	**W** 52–34	62,467	
September 14	8:00 p.m.	No. 21 Notre Dame	**Purdue**	Ross–Ade Stadium • West Lafayette, IN (Shillelagh Trophy)	ABC	**L** 31–24	61,127	
September 14	9:00 p.m.	Western Michigan	No. 17 **Northwestern**	Ryan Field • Evanston, IL	BTN	**W** 38–17	33,128	
September 14	10:30 p.m.	No. 20 **Wisconsin**	Arizona State	Sun Devil Stadium • Tempe, AZ	ESPN	**L** 32–30	66,155	
^{#}Rankings from AP Poll released prior to game. All times are in Eastern Time.

=== Week 4 ===
Date	Time	Visiting team	Home team	Site	TV	Result	Attendance	Ref.
September 21	12:00 p.m.	Western Michigan	**Iowa**	Kinnick Stadium • Iowa City, IA	BTN	**W** 59–3	66,886	
September 21	12:00 p.m.	San Jose State	**Minnesota**	TCF Bank Stadium • Minneapolis, MN	ESPN2	**W** 43–24	45,647	
September 21	12:00 p.m.	Florida A&M	No. 4 **Ohio State**	Ohio Stadium • Columbus, OH	BTN	**W** 76–0	103,595	
September 21	3:30 p.m.	**Michigan State**	No. 22 Notre Dame	Notre Dame Stadium • Notre Dame, IN (Megaphone Trophy)	NBC	**L** 13–17	80,795	
September 21	3:30 p.m.	South Dakota State	**Nebraska**	Memorial Stadium • Lincoln, NE	BTN	**W** 59–20	90,614	
September 21	3:30 p.m.	Maine	No. 18 **Northwestern**	Ryan Field • Evanston, IL	BTN	**W** 35–21	32,726	
September 21	3:30 p.m.	Kent State	**Penn State**	Beaver Stadium • University Park, PA	BTN	**W** 34–0	92,371	
September 21	3:30 p.m.	**Purdue**	No. 24 **Wisconsin**	Camp Randall Stadium • Madison, WI	ABC / ESPN2	**WIS** 41–10	80,772	
September 21	8:00 p.m.	Missouri	**Indiana**	Memorial Stadium • Bloomington, IN	BTN	**L** 28–45	49,149	
September 21	8:00 p.m.	No. 15 **Michigan**	Connecticut	Rentschler Field • East Hartford, CT	ABC	**W** 24–21	42,704	
^{#}Rankings from AP Poll released prior to game. All times are in Eastern Time.

Date	Bye Week
September 21	Illinois

=== Week 5 ===
Date	Time	Visiting team	Home team	Site	TV	Result	Attendance	Ref.
September 28†	12:00 p.m.	Northern Illinois	**Purdue**	Ross–Ade Stadium • West Lafayette, IN	ESPN2	**L** 55–24	54,258	
September 28	12:00 p.m.	Miami (OH)	**Illinois**	Memorial Stadium • Champaign, IL	BTN	**W** 50–14	46,890	
September 28†	3:30 p.m.	**Iowa**	**Minnesota**	TCF Bank Stadium • Minneapolis, MN (Floyd of Rosedale)	ABC / ESPN2	**IOWA** 23–7	51,382	
September 28	8:00 p.m.	No. 23 **Wisconsin**	No. 4 **Ohio State**	Ohio Stadium • Columbus, OH	ABC	**OSU** 31–24	105,826	
^{#}Rankings from AP Poll released prior to game. All times are in Eastern Time.

Date	Bye Week					
September 28	Indiana	#18 Michigan	Michigan State	Nebraska	#17 Northwestern	Penn State

=== Week 6 ===
Date	Time	Visiting team	Home team	Site	TV	Result	Attendance	Ref.
October 5	12:00 p.m.	**Penn State**	**Indiana**	Memorial Stadium • Bloomington, IN	BTN	**IND** 44–24	42,125	
October 5†	12:00 p.m.	**Illinois**	**Nebraska**	Memorial Stadium • Lincoln, NE	ESPNU	**NEB** 39–19	90,458	
October 5†	12:00 p.m.	**Michigan State**	**Iowa**	Kinnick Stadium • Iowa City, IA	ESPN2	**MSU** 26–14	69,025	
October 5†	3:30 p.m.	**Minnesota**	No. 19 **Michigan**	Michigan Stadium • Ann Arbor, MI (Little Brown Jug)	ABC / ESPN2	**MICH** 42–13	111,079	
October 5†	8:00 p.m.	No. 4 **Ohio State**	No. 16 **Northwestern**	Ryan Field • Evanston, IL	ABC	**OSU** 40–30	47,330	
^{#}Rankings from AP Poll released prior to game. All times are in Eastern Time.

Date	Bye Week	
October 5	Purdue	Wisconsin

=== Week 7 ===
Date	Time	Visiting team	Home team	Site	TV	Result	Attendance	Ref.
October 12†	12:00 p.m.	**Indiana**	**Michigan State**	Spartan Stadium • East Lansing, MI (Old Brass Spittoon)	ESPN2	**MSU** 42–28	73,815	
October 12	12:00 p.m.	**Nebraska**	**Purdue**	Ross–Ade Stadium • West Lafayette, IN	BTN	**NEB** 44–7	47,203	
October 12†	3:30 p.m.	No. 19 **Northwestern**	**Wisconsin**	Camp Randall Stadium • Madison, WI	ABC / ESPN2	**WIS** 35–6	81,411	
October 12†	5:00 p.m.	No. 18 **Michigan**	**Penn State**	Beaver Stadium • University Park, PA	ESPN	**PSU** 43–40 ^{4OT}	107,884	
^{#}Rankings from AP Poll released prior to game. All times are in Eastern Time.

Date	Bye Week			
October 12	Illinois	Iowa	Minnesota	#4 Ohio State

=== Week 8 ===
Date	Time	Visiting team	Home team	Site	TV	Result	Attendance	Ref.
October 19	12:00 p.m.	**Purdue**	**Michigan State**	Spartan Stadium • East Lansing, MI	BTN	**MSU** 14–0	71,514	
October 19	12:00 p.m.	**Minnesota**	**Northwestern**	Ryan Field • Evanston, IL	ESPN2	**MIN** 20–17	36,587	
October 19	3:30 p.m.	**Indiana**	**Michigan**	Michigan Stadium • Ann Arbor, MI	BTN	**MICH** 63–47	109,503	
October 19†	3:30 p.m.	**Iowa**	No. 4 **Ohio State**	Ohio Stadium • Columbus, OH	ABC	**OSU** 34–24	105,264	
October 19	8:00 p.m.	No. 25 **Wisconsin**	**Illinois**	Memorial Stadium • Champaign, IL	BTN	**WIS** 56–32	47,362	
^{#}Rankings from AP Poll released prior to game. All times are in Eastern Time.

Date	Bye Week	
October 19	Nebraska	Penn State

=== Week 9 ===
Date	Time	Visiting team	Home team	Site	TV	Result	Attendance	Ref.
October 26	12:00 p.m.	**Northwestern**	**Iowa**	Kinnick Stadium • Iowa City, IA	BTN	**IOWA** 17–10 ^{OT}	66,838	
October 26	12:00 p.m.	No. 25 **Nebraska**	**Minnesota**	TCF Bank Stadium • Minneapolis, MN	ESPN	**MIN** 34–20	49,995	
October 26†	3:30 p.m.	**Michigan State**	**Illinois**	Memorial Stadium • Champaign, IL	ABC / ESPN2	**MSU** 42–3	45,895	
October 26	8:00 p.m.	**Penn State**	No. 4 **Ohio State**	Ohio Stadium • Columbus, OH	ABC	**OSU** 63–14	105,889	
^{#}Rankings from AP Poll released prior to game. All times are in Eastern Time.

Date	Bye Week			
October 26	Indiana	#24 Michigan	Purdue	#22 Wisconsin

=== Week 10 ===
Date	Time	Visiting team	Home team	Site	TV	Result	Attendance	Ref.
November 2	12:00 p.m.	No. 4 **Ohio State**	**Purdue**	Ross–Ade Stadium • West Lafayette, IN	BTN	**OSU** 56–0	51,423	
November 2	12:00 p.m.	No. 22 **Wisconsin**	**Iowa**	Kinnick Stadium • Iowa City, IA (Heartland Trophy)	ABC / ESPN2	**WIS** 28–9	69,812	
November 2	12:00 p.m.	**Illinois**	**Penn State**	Beaver Stadium • University Park, PA	ESPN	**PSU** 24–17 ^{OT}	95,131	
November 2†	3:30 p.m.	**Minnesota**	**Indiana**	Memorial Stadium • Bloomington, IN	BTN	**MIN** 42–39	44,625	
November 2	3:30 p.m.	No. 23 **Michigan**	No. 24 **Michigan State**	Spartan Stadium • East Lansing, MI (Paul Bunyan Trophy)	ABC	**MSU** 29–6	76,306	
November 2	3:30 p.m.	**Northwestern**	**Nebraska**	Memorial Stadium • Lincoln, NE	BTN	**NEB** 27–24	91,140	
^{#}Rankings from AP Poll released prior to game. All times are in Eastern Time.

=== Week 11 ===
Date	Time	Visiting team	Home team	Site	TV	Result	Attendance	Ref.
November 9	12:00 p.m.	**Iowa**	**Purdue**	Ross–Ade Stadium • West Lafayette, IN	BTN	**IOWA** 38–14	41,038	
November 9	12:00 p.m.	**Penn State**	**Minnesota**	TCF Bank Stadium • Minneapolis, MN (Governor's Victory Bell)	ESPN2	**MIN** 24–10	48,123	
November 9	3:30 p.m.	**Illinois**	**Indiana**	Memorial Stadium • Bloomington, IN	BTN	**IND** 52–35	44,882	
November 9	3:30 p.m.	**Nebraska**	**Michigan**	Michigan Stadium • Ann Arbor, MI	ABC	**NEB** 17–13	112,204	
November 9	3:30 p.m.	Brigham Young	No. 21 **Wisconsin**	Camp Randall Stadium • Madison, WI	ESPN	**W** 27–17	80,191	
^{#}Rankings from AP Poll released prior to game. All times are in Eastern Time.

Date	Bye Week		
November 9	#18 Michigan State	Northwestern	#4 Ohio State

=== Week 12 ===
Date	Time	Visiting team	Home team	Site	TV	Result	Attendance	Ref.
November 16	12:00 p.m.	No. 3 **Ohio State**	**Illinois**	Memorial Stadium • Champaign, IL (Illibuck)	ESPN	**OSU** 60–35	44,095	
November 16	12:00 p.m.	**Purdue**	**Penn State**	Beaver Stadium • University Park, PA	BTN	**PSU** 45–21	96,491	
November 16	12:00 p.m.	**Indiana**	No. 17 **Wisconsin**	Camp Randall Stadium • Madison, WI	ESPN2	**WIS** 51–3	77,849	
November 16	3:30 p.m.	**Michigan**	**Northwestern**	Ryan Field • Evanston, IL	BTN	**MICH** 27–19 ^{3OT}	47,330	
November 16	3:30 p.m.	No. 14 **Michigan State**	**Nebraska**	Memorial Stadium • Lincoln, NE	ABC / ESPN2	**MSU** 41–28	90,872	
^{#}Rankings from AP Poll released prior to game. All times are in Eastern Time.

Date	Bye Week	
November 16	Iowa	Minnesota

=== Week 13 ===
Date	Time	Visiting team	Home team	Site	TV	Result	Attendance	Ref.
November 23	12:00 p.m.	**Illinois**	**Purdue**	Ross–Ade Stadium • West Lafayette, IN (Purdue Cannon)	BTN	**ILL** 20–16	37,459	
November 23	12:00 p.m.	**Michigan**	**Iowa**	Kinnick Stadium • Iowa City, IA	BTN	**IOWA** 24–21	65,708	
November 23	12:00 p.m.	No. 13 **Michigan State**	**Northwestern**	Ryan Field • Evanston, IL	ESPN	**MSU** 30–6	40,013	
November 23	3:30 p.m.	No. 16 **Wisconsin**	**Minnesota**	TCF Bank Stadium • Minneapolis, MN (Paul Bunyan's Axe)	ESPN	**WIS** 20–7	53,090	
November 23	3:30 p.m.	**Indiana**	No. 4 **Ohio State**	Ohio Stadium • Columbus, OH	ABC / ESPN2	**OSU** 42–14	104,990	
November 23	3:30 p.m.	**Nebraska**	**Penn State**	Beaver Stadium • University Park, PA	BTN	**NEB** 23–20 ^{OT}	98,517	
^{#}Rankings from AP Poll released prior to game. All times are in Eastern Time.

=== Week 14 ===
Date	Time	Visiting team	Home team	Site	TV	Result	Attendance	Ref.
November 29	12:00 p.m.	**Iowa**	**Nebraska**	Memorial Stadium • Lincoln, NE (Heroes Game)	ABC	**IOWA** 38–17	91,260	
November 30	12:00 p.m.	No. 3 **Ohio State**	**Michigan**	Michigan Stadium • Ann Arbor, MI (The Game)	ABC	**OSU** 42–41	113,511	
November 30	12:00 p.m.	**Minnesota**	No. 11 **Michigan State**	Spartan Stadium • East Lansing, MI	BTN	**MSU** 14–3	71,418	
November 30	3:30 p.m.	**Northwestern**	**Illinois**	Memorial Stadium • Champaign, IL (Land of Lincoln Trophy)	BTN	**NW** 37–34	37,058	
November 30	3:30 p.m.	**Purdue**	**Indiana**	Memorial Stadium • Bloomington, IN (Old Oaken Bucket)	BTN	**IND** 56–36	44,882	
November 30	3:30 p.m.	**Penn State**	No. 14 **Wisconsin**	Camp Randall Stadium • Madison, WI	ESPN	**PSU** 31–24	78,064	
^{#}Rankings from AP Poll released prior to game. All times are in Eastern Time.

=== Big Ten Championship Game ===
Date	Time	Visiting team	Home team	Site	TV	Result	Attendance	Ref.
December 7	8:00 p.m.	No. 2 **Ohio State**	No. 10 **Michigan State**	Lucas Oil Stadium • Indianapolis, IN (2013 Big Ten Championship)	FOX	**MSU** 34–24	66,002	
^{#}Rankings from AP Poll released prior to game. All times are in Eastern Time.

== Bowl games ==
The Big Ten did not have enough teams available to fill the Heart of Dallas Bowl and Little Caesars Pizza Bowl due to landing two teams in the BCS and also a lack of bowl eligible teams.

Bowl Game	Date	Site	Television	Time (EST)	Opponent	Visiting team	Home team	Score	Attendance	Ref.
Texas Bowl	December 27	Reliant Stadium • Houston, TX	ESPN	6:00 p.m.	ACC	Syracuse	Minnesota	L 21–17	32,327	
Buffalo Wild Wings Bowl	December 28	Sun Devil Stadium • Tempe, AZ	ESPN	10:15 p.m.	Big 12	Michigan	Kansas State	L 31–14	53,284	
Gator Bowl	January 1	EverBank Field • Jacksonville, FL	ESPN2	12:00 p.m.	SEC	Nebraska	#23 Georgia	W 24–19	60,712	
Outback Bowl	January 1	Raymond James Stadium • Tampa, FL	ESPN	1:00 p.m.	SEC	Iowa	#14 LSU	L 21–14	51,296	
Capital One Bowl	January 1	Citrus Bowl • Orlando, FL	ABC	1:00 p.m.	SEC	#19 Wisconsin	#8 South Carolina	L 34–24	56,629	
Rose Bowl	January 1	Rose Bowl • Pasadena, CA	ESPN	5:00 p.m.	Pac-12	#5 Stanford	#4 Michigan State	W 24–20	95,173	
Orange Bowl	January 3	Sun Life Stadium • Miami Gardens, FL	ESPN	8:30 p.m.	ACC	#12 Clemson	#7 Ohio State	L 40–35	72,080	

== Records against FBS conferences ==
2013 records against FBS conferences:

Through January 3, 2014

Conference	Record
ACC	2–2
American	3–2
Big 12	1–1
C-USA	1–0
Independents	3–3
MAC	11–2
Mountain West	4–0
Pac-12	3–3
SEC	1-3
Sun Belt	0–0
Total	29–16

== Players of the Week ==
Week	Offensive			Defensive			Special Teams			Freshman		
Week	Player	Position	Team	Player	Position	Team	Player	Position	Team	Player	Position	Team
Week 1	Nathan Scheelhaase	QB	ILL	Collin Ellis	LB	NW	Sam Ficken	PK	PSU	Christian Hackenberg	QB	PSU
Week 2	Jeremy Gallon	WR	MICH	Shilique Calhoun	DE	MSU	Marcus Jones	PR/KR	MINN	Corey Clement	RB	WIS
Week 2	Jeremy Gallon	WR	MICH	Shilique Calhoun	DE	MSU	Akeem Hunt	KR	PUR	Corey Clement	RB	WIS
Week 3	Kenny Guiton	QB	OSU	Ryan Shazier	LB	OSU	Justin DuVernois	P	ILL	Christian Hackenberg	QB	PSU
Week 4	Kenny Guiton	QB	OSU	B.J. Lowery	DB	IOWA	Kevonte Martin-Manley	PR	IOWA	Mitch Leidner	QB	MIN
Week 4	Melvin Gordon	RB	WIS	B.J. Lowery	DB	IOWA	Kevonte Martin-Manley	PR	IOWA	Mitch Leidner	QB	MIN
Week 5	Braxton Miller	QB	OSU	James Morris	LB	IOWA	Cameron Johnston	P	OSU	Aaron Bailey	QB	ILL
Week 6	Ameer Abdullah	RB	NEB	Darqueze Dennard	CB	MSU	Bradley Roby	CB	OSU	Joey Bosa	DE	OSU
Week 6	Carlos Hyde	RB	OSU	Darqueze Dennard	CB	MSU	Bradley Roby	CB	OSU	Joey Bosa	DE	OSU
Week 7	Jeremy Langford	RB	MSU	C.J. Olaniyan	DE	PSU	Mike Sadler	P	MSU	Christian Hackenberg	QB	PSU
Week 8	Jeremy Gallon	WR	MICH	Max Bullough	LB	MSU	Mitch Ewald	PK	IND	Desmond King	DB	IOWA
Week 9	Braxton Miller	QB	OSU	James Morris	LB	IOWA	Chris Hawthorne	PK	MIN	Dontre Wilson	RB	OSU
Week 10	Philip Nelson	QB	MIN	Denicos Allen	LB	MSU	Peter Mortell	P	MIN	Jordan Westerkamp	WR	NEB
Week 10	Bill Belton	RB	PSU	Denicos Allen	LB	MSU	Peter Mortell	P	MIN	Jordan Westerkamp	WR	NEB
Week 11	Tevin Coleman	RB	IND	Randy Gregory	DE	NEB	Peter Mortell	P	MIN	Tommy Armstrong Jr.	QB	NEB
Week 11	Tevin Coleman	RB	IND	Chris Borland	LB	WIS	Peter Mortell	P	MIN	Tommy Armstrong Jr.	QB	NEB
Week 12	Carlos Hyde	RB	OSU	Ryan Shazier	LB	OSU	Brendan Gibbons	PK	MICH	Corey Clement	RB	WIS
Week 13	Steve Hull	WR	ILL	Ryan Shazier	LB	OSU	Pat Smith	PK	NEB	Ralphael Green III	DT	IND
Week 13	Steve Hull	WR	ILL	Ryan Shazier	LB	OSU	Pat Smith	PK	NEB	Christian Hackenberg	QB	PSU
Week 14	Tre Roberson	QB	IND	Christian Kirksey	LB	IOWA	Jeff Budzien	PK	NW	Christian Hackenberg	QB	PSU

== Players of the Year ==
Award	Player	School
Graham-George Offensive Player of the Year	Braxton Miller	Ohio State
Nagurski-Woodson Defensive Player of the Year	Chris Borland	Wisconsin
Thompson-Randle El Freshman of the Year	Christian Hackenberg	Penn State
Griese-Brees Quarterback of the Year	Braxton Miller	Ohio State
Richter-Howard Receiver of the Year	Allen Robinson	Penn State
Ameche-Dayne Running Back of the Year	Carlos Hyde	Ohio State
Kwalick-Clark Tight End of the Year	Devin Funchess	Michigan
Rimington-Pace Offensive Lineman of the Year	Taylor Lewan	Michigan
Smith-Brown Defensive Lineman of the Year	Shilique Calhoun	Michigan State
Butkus-Fitzgerald Linebacker of the Year	Chris Borland	Wisconsin
Tatum-Woodson Defensive Back of the Year	Darqueze Dennard	Michigan State
Bakken-Andersen Kicker of the Year	Jeff Budzien	Northwestern
Eddleman-Fields Punter of the Year	Cody Webster	Purdue
Dave McClain/Hayes-Schembechler Coach of the Year	Mark Dantonio	Michigan State

== All-Conference Players ==
Coaches All-Conference Selections

Position	Player	Class	Team
First Team Offense (Coaches)
QB	Braxton Miller	Jr.	Ohio State
RB	Ameer Abdullah	Jr.	Nebraska
RB	Carlos Hyde	Sr.	Ohio State
WR	Allen Robinson	Jr.	Penn State
WR	Jared Abbrederis	Sr.	Wisconsin
TE	C.J. Fiedorowicz	Sr.	Iowa
OT	Brandon Scherff	Jr.	Iowa
OG	John Urschel	Sr.	Penn State
C	Corey Linsley	Sr.	Ohio State
OG	Ryan Groy	Sr.	Wisconsin
OT	Taylor Lewan	Sr.	Michigan
First Team Defense (Coaches)
DL	Shilique Calhoun	So.	Michigan State
DL	Ra'Shede Hageman	Sr.	Minnesota
DL	Randy Gregory	Jr.	Nebraska
DL	DaQuan Jones	Sr.	Penn State
LB	Ryan Shazier	Jr.	Ohio State
LB	Chris Borland	Sr.	Wisconsin
LB	Max Bullough	Sr.	Michigan State
DB	Darqueze Dennard	Sr.	Michigan State
DB	Kurtis Drummond	Jr.	Michigan State
DB	Isaiah Lewis	Sr.	Michigan State
DB	Brock Vereen	Sr.	Minnesota
DB	Ciante Evans	Sr.	Nebraska
DB	Bradley Roby	Jr.	Ohio State
First Team Special Teams (Coaches)
PK	Jeff Budzien	Sr.	Northwestern
P	Mike Sadler	Jr.	Michigan State
P	Cody Webster	Sr.	Purdue

Position	Player	Class	Team
Second Team Offense (Coaches)
QB	Connor Cook	So.	Michigan State
RB	Melvin Gordon	So.	Wisconsin
RB	James White	Sr.	Wisconsin
WR	Jeremy Gallon	Sr.	Michigan
WR	Corey Brown	Sr.	Ohio State
TE	Devin Funchess	So.	Michigan
OT	Brett Van Sloten	Sr.	Iowa
OG	Blake Treadwell	Sr.	Michigan State
C	Cole Pensick	Sr.	Nebraska
OG	Andrew Norwell	Sr.	Ohio State
OT	Jack Mewhort	Sr.	Ohio State
Second Team Defense (Coaches)
DL	Carl Davis	Jr.	Iowa
DL	Frank Clark	Jr.	Michigan
DL	Michael Bennett	Jr.	Ohio State
DL	Noah Spence	So.	Ohio State
LB	Anthony Hitchens	Sr.	Iowa
LB	James Morris	Sr.	Iowa
LB	Denicos Allen	Sr.	Michigan State
DB	Blake Countess	So.	Michigan
DB	Stanley Jean-Baptiste	Sr.	Nebraska
DB	(none)		
DB	(none)		
Second Team Special Teams (Coaches)
PK	Mitch Ewald	Sr.	Indiana
P	(none)		

HONORABLE MENTION: Illinois: Jonathan Brown, Steve Hull, Nathan Scheelhaase; Indiana: Ted Bolser, Tevin Coleman, Cody Latimer, Jason Spriggs; Iowa: Austin Blythe, Conor Boffeli, Christian Kirksey, B.J. Lowery, Tanner Miller, Louis Trinca-Pasat; Michigan: Jibreel Black, Michael Schofield; Michigan State: Jack Allen, Fou Fonoti, Dan France, Jeremy Langford, Marcus Rush, Trae Waynes; Minnesota: Caleb Bak, Aaron Hill, Peter Mortell, Eric Murray; Nebraska: Jason Ankrah, Kenny Bell, Corey Cooper, Andrew Rodriguez, Jeremiah Sirles; Northwestern: Ibraheim Campbell, Tyler Scott, Brandon Vitabile; Ohio State: C.J. Barnett, Drew Basil, Joey Bosa, Doran Grant, Marcus Hall, Jeff Heuerman, Cameron Johnston, Devin Smith; Penn State: Adrian Amos, Glenn Carson, Christian Hackenberg, Ty Howle, Jordan Lucas, C.J. Olaniyan, Donovan Smith; Purdue: Ricardo Allen; Wisconsin: Beau Allen, Rob Havenstein, Tyler Marz, Pat Muldoon, Jacob Pedersen, Dezmen Southward.

Coaches selected six players as First Team All-Conference defensive backs and two players as First Team punters which resulted in less second team selections

Unanimous selections in ALL CAPS

Media All-Conference Selections

Position	Player	Class	Team
First Team Offense (Media)
QB	Braxton Miller	Jr.	Ohio State
RB	Ameer Abdullah	Jr.	Nebraska
RB	Carlos Hyde	Sr.	Ohio State
WR	Allen Robinson	Jr.	Penn State
WR	Jared Abbrederis	Sr.	Wisconsin
TE	Devin Funchess	So.	Michigan
OT	Taylor Lewan	Sr.	Michigan
OG	John Urschel	Sr.	Penn State
C	Corey Linsley	Sr.	Ohio State
OG	Andrew Norwell	Sr.	Ohio State
OT	Jack Mewhort	Sr.	Ohio State
First Team Defense (Media)
DL	Shilique Calhoun	So.	Michigan State
DL	Ra'Shede Hageman	Sr.	Minnesota
DL	Randy Gregory	Jr.	Nebraska
DL	Noah Spence	So.	Ohio State
LB	Ryan Shazier	Jr.	Ohio State
LB	Chris Borland	Sr.	Wisconsin
LB	Max Bullough	Sr.	Michigan State
DB	Darqueze Dennard	Sr.	Michigan State
DB	B.J. Lowery	Sr.	Iowa
DB	Blake Countess	So.	Michigan
DB	Bradley Roby	Jr.	Ohio State
First Team Special Teams (Media)
PK	Jeff Budzien	Sr.	Northwestern
P	Cody Webster	Sr.	Purdue

Position	Player	Class	Team
Second Team Offense (Media)
QB	Nathan Scheelhaase	Sr.	Illinois
RB	Melvin Gordon	So.	Wisconsin
RB	James White	Sr.	Wisconsin
WR	Jeremy Gallon	Sr.	Michigan
WR	Cody Latimer	Jr.	Indiana
TE	C.J. Fiedorowicz	Sr.	Iowa
OT	Brandon Scherff	Sr.	Iowa
OG	Blake Treadwell	Sr.	Michigan State
C	Jack Allen	So.	Michigan State
OG	Ryan Groy	Sr.	Wisconsin
OT	Rob Havenstein	Jr.	Wisconsin
Second Team Defense (Media)
DL	Theiren Cockran	So.	Minnesota
DL	Tyler Scott	Sr.	Northwestern
DL	Michael Bennett	Jr.	Ohio State
DL	DaQuan Jones	Sr.	Penn State
LB	James Morris	Sr.	Iowa
LB	Jonathan Brown	Sr.	Illinois
LB	Denicos Allen	Sr.	Michigan State
DB	Kurtis Drummond	Jr.	Michigan State
DB	Ciante Evans	Sr.	Nebraska
DB	Stanley Jean-Baptiste	Sr.	Nebraska
DB	Ricardo Allen	Sr.	Purdue
Second Team Special Teams (Media)
PK	Mike Meyer	Sr.	Iowa
P	Mike Sadler	Jr.	Michigan State

HONORABLE MENTION: Illinois: Houston Bates, Steve Hull; Indiana: Tim Bennett, Ted Bolser, Tevin Coleman, Mitch Ewald, Collin Rahrig, Jason Spriggs; Iowa: Austin Blythe, Conor Boffeli, Carl Davis, Anthony Hitchens, Christian Kirksey, Casey Kreiter, John Lowdermilk, Tanner Miller, Louis Trinca-Pasat; Brett Van Sloten; Michigan: Jibreel Black, Frank Clark, Devin Gardner, Brendan Gibbons, Raymon Taylor; Michigan State: Connor Cook, Fou Fonoti; Dan France, Michael Geiger, Jeremy Langford, Isaiah Lewis, Marcus Rush, Trae Waynes; Minnesota: Caleb Bak, Josh Campion, Zac Epping, Peter Mortell, Eric Murray, Brock Vereen; Nebraska: Jason Ankrah, Kenny Bell, Cole Pensick, Andrew Rodriguez, Jeremiah Sirles, Pat Smith; Northwestern: Chi Chi Ariguzo, Ibraheim Campbell, Damien Proby, Brandoo Vitabile; Ohio State: C.J. Barnett, Drew Basil, Joey Bosa, Corey Brown, Doran Grant, Marcus Hall, Jeff Heuerman, Cameron Johnston; Penn State: Glenn Carson, Sam Ficken, Christian Hackenberg, Ty Howle, Jesse James, Jordan Lucas, C.J. Olaniyan, Donovan Smith; Wisconsin: Beau Allen, Michael Caputo, Tyler Marz, Pat Muldoon, Jacob Pedersen, Sojourn Shelton, Dezmen Southward, Joel Stave.

== All-Americans ==
There are many outlets that award All-America honors in football. The NCAA uses five official selectors to also determine Consensus and Unanimous All-America honors. The five teams used by the NCAA to compile the consensus team are from the Associated Press, the AFCA, the FWAA, The Sporting News and the Walter Camp Football Foundation. A point system is used to calculate the consensus honors. The point system consists of three points for first team, two points for second team and three points for third team. No honorable mention or fourth team or lower are used in the computation.

The teams are compiled by position and the player accumulating the most points at each position is named a Consensus All-American. If there is a tie at a position in football for first team then the players who are tied shall be named to the team. A player named first-team by all five of the NCAA-recognized selectors is recognized as a Unanimous All-American.

2013 First Team All-Americans

Player	School	Position	Selector
Ryan Shazier	Ohio State	LB	USA Today, Athlon Sports, ESPN, AP, SI, Phil Steele
Darqueze Dennard	Michigan State	DB	USA Today, Athlon Sports, Walter Camp, Sporting News, ESPN, AP, CBS Sports, SI, AFCA, FWAA, Phil Steele
Jeff Budzien	Northwestern	PK	Bleacher Report, Sporting News
Allen Robinson	Penn State	WR	Sporting News, CBS Sports, Phil Steele
Taylor Lewan	Michigan	OL	Sporting News
Jack Mewhort	Ohio State	OL	ESPN
Mike Sadler	Michigan State	P	ESPN, CBS Sports
Chris Borland	Wisconsin	LB	FWAA, Phil Steele

== Academic All-Americans ==
Once again the Big Ten led all conferences with eight student-athletes being named to the Capital One Academic All-America first or second teams as announced by CoSIDA. The Big Ten has now led all FBS conferences in Academic All-America selections for nine straight seasons, with a total of 72 honorees over that time span.

First Team: Mark Murphy, Indiana; James Morris, Iowa; Max Bullough, Michigan State; Mike Sadler, Michigan State; Spencer Long, Nebraska; John Urschel, Penn State; Second Team: Jake Long, Nebraska; C.J. Zimmerer, Nebraska.

== National award winners ==
- Pat Narduzzi, Michigan State - Frank Broyles Award (top assistant coach)
- Darqueze Dennard, Michigan State - Jim Thorpe Award (top defensive back)
- John Urschel, Penn State - Campbell Trophy ("academic Heisman")
- Jared Abbrederis, Wisconsin – Burlsworth Trophy (top player who began as a walk-on)

== Attendance ==
Team	Stadium	Capacity	Game 1	Game 2	Game 3	Game 4	Game 5	Game 6	Game 7	Game 8	Total	Average	% of Capacity
Illinois	Memorial Stadium	60,670	42,175	43,031	46,890	47,362	45,895	44,095	37,058	—	306,506	43,787	72.2%
Indiana	Memorial Stadium	52,929	40,278	47,013	41,869	49,149	42,125	44,625	44,882	44,882	354,823	44,353	83.8%
Iowa	Kinnick Stadium	70,585	67,402	64,201	66,886	69,025	66,838	69,812	65,708	—	469,872	67,125	95.1%
Michigan	Michigan Stadium	109,901	112,618	115,109	107,120	111,079	109,503	112,204	113,511	—	781,144	111,592	101.5%
Michigan State	Spartan Stadium	75,005	71,214	70,401	71,626	73,815	71,514	76,306	71,418	—	506,294	72,328	96.4%
Minnesota	TCF Bank Stadium	50,805	44,217	42,127	45,647	51,382	49,995	48,123	53,090	—	334,581	47,797	94.1%
Nebraska	Memorial Stadium	87,091	91,185	90,466	91,471	90,614	90,458	91,140	90,872	91,260	727,466	90,933	104.4%
Northwestern	Ryan Field	47,130	38,033	33,128	32,726	47,330	36,587	47,330	40,013	—	275,147	39,307	83.4%
Ohio State	Ohio Stadium	102,329	103,980	104,984	103,595	105,826	105,264	105,889	104,990	—	734,528	104,933	102.5%
Penn State	Beaver Stadium	106,572	92,863	92,855	92,371	107,884	95,131	96,491	98,517	—	676,112	96,587	90.6%
Purdue	Ross–Ade Stadium	62,500	50,165	61,127	54,258	47,203	51,423	41,038	37,459	—	342,673	48,953	78.3%
Wisconsin	Camp Randall Stadium	80,321	76,306	77,785	80,772	81,411	80,191	77,849	78,064	—	552,378	78,911	98.2%
TOTAL	–	–	–	–	–	–	–	–	–	–	6,061,524	70,483	–

== 2014 NFL draft ==
30 Big Ten athletes were drafted in the 2014 NFL Draft.

Team	Round 1	Round 2	Round 3	Round 4	Round 5	Round 6	Round 7	Total
Illinois								0
Indiana		1					1	2
Iowa			2	1				3
Michigan	1		1				1	3
Michigan State	1							1
Minnesota		1		1				2
Nebraska		1	1			1		3
Northwestern								0
Ohio State	2	2			1		1	6
Penn State		1		1	1			3
Purdue					2			2
Wisconsin			2	1	1		1	5
Total	4	6	6	4	5	1	4	30

Rnd.	Pick	Team	Player	Pos.	College	Notes
1	11	Tennessee Titans	Taylor Lewan	T	Michigan	
1	15	Pittsburgh Steelers	Ryan Shazier	LB	Ohio State	
1	24	Cincinnati Bengals	Darqueze Dennard	CB	Michigan State	
1	31	Denver Broncos	Bradley Roby	CB	Ohio State	
2	37	Atlanta Falcons	Ra'Shede Hageman	DT	Minnesota	
2	56	Denver Broncos	Cody Latimer	WR	Indiana	from Kansas City via San Francisco (Note: No. 56: Kansas City → San Francisco (PD). Kansas City traded a conditional 2014 third-round selection along with a 2013 second-round selection to San Francisco in exchange for quarterback Alex Smith; the 2014 selection was later upgraded to a second-rounder after a condition was met in which Kansas City won a minimum of eight games during the 2013 season.)
2	57	San Francisco 49ers	Carlos Hyde	RB	Ohio State	from San Diego via Miami (Note: No. 57: multiple trades: No. 57: San Diego → Miami (D). see No. 50: Miami → San Diego. No. 57: Miami → San Francisco (D). Miami traded this selection to San Francisco in exchange for San Francisco's third- and fifth-round selections (Nos. 70 and 150 overall, respectively).)
2	58	New Orleans Saints	Stanley Jean-Baptiste	CB	Nebraska	
2	59	Indianapolis Colts	Jack Mewhort	T	Ohio State	
2	61	Jacksonville Jaguars	Allen Robinson	WR	Penn State	from San Francisco (Note: No. 61: San Francisco → Jacksonville (D). San Francisco traded this selection to Jacksonville in exchange for Jacksonville's third- and fifth-round selections (Nos. 70 and 150 overall, respectively).)
3	65	Houston Texans	C. J. Fiedorowicz	TE	Iowa	
3	68	Atlanta Falcons	Dezmen Southward	FS	Wisconsin	
3	71	Cleveland Browns	Christian Kirksey	OLB	Iowa	
3	77		Chris Borland	ILB	Wisconsin	from Tennessee (Note: No. 77: Tennessee → San Francisco (PD). Tennessee traded this selection, along with its 2013 second- and seventh-round selections to San Francisco in exchange for San Francisco's 2013 second-round selection.)
3	78	Washington Redskins	Spencer Long	G	Nebraska	from Dallas (Note: No. 78: Dallas → Washington (D). see No. 34: Washington → Dallas.)
3	95	Denver Broncos	Michael Schofield	T	Michigan	
4	112	Tennessee Titans	DaQuan Jones	DT	Penn State	
4	119	Dallas Cowboys	Anthony Hitchens	OLB	Iowa	
4	130	New England Patriots	James White	RB	Wisconsin	
4	131	Chicago Bears	Brock Vereen	FS	Minnesota	from Denver (Note: No. 131: Denver → Chicago (D). Denver traded their fourth-round selection (No. 131 overall) and their original seventh-round selection (No. 246 overall) to Chicago in exchange for Chicago's fifth-round selection (No. 156 overall) and 2015 fifth-round selection.)
5	147	Atlanta Falcons	Ricardo Allen	CB	Purdue	
5	149	Tampa Bay Buccaneers	Kevin Pamphile	T	Purdue	
5	161	Green Bay Packers	Corey Linsley	C	Ohio State	
5*	175	Baltimore Ravens	John Urschel	G	Penn State	
5*	176	Green Bay Packers	Jared Abbrederis	WR	Wisconsin	
6*	209	New York Jets	Quincy Enunwa	WR	Nebraska	
7	217	Washington Redskins	Ted Bolser	TE	Indiana	
7	224	Philadelphia Eagles	Beau Allen	DT	Wisconsin	from Buffalo Bills (Note: No. 224: Buffalo Bills → Philadelphia (D). The Buffalo Bills exchanged 7th round picks with Philadelphia as part of a trade for running back Bryce Brown, which also involves a future draft pick being sent to the Eagles (either the 49ers 2015 4th round pick, conditionally acquired by the Bills in exchange for Stevie Johnson, or the Buffalo's 2016 4th round pick, or Buffalo's 2016 3rd round pick).)
7	241	St. Louis Rams	C. B. Bryant	FS	Ohio State	from Indianapolis (Note: No. 241: Indianapolis → St. Louis (PD). Indianapolis traded this selection to St. Louis in exchange for cornerback Josh Gordy.)
7	244	New England Patriots	Jeremy Gallon	WR	Michigan	

N.B: In the explanations below, (D) denotes trades that took place during the 2014 Draft, while (PD) indicates trades completed pre-draft.

=== NFL Draft Selections by NCAA Conference ===
SEC - 49
ACC - 42
Pac-12 - 34
Big Ten - 30
Big 12 - 17
Mountain West - 16
American - 12
C-USA - 9
Independents - 9
MAC - 8
Sun Belt - 4

Non-FBS Conferences - 26

== Head coaches ==
- Tim Beckman, Illinois
- Kevin R. Wilson, Indiana
- Kirk Ferentz, Iowa
- Brady Hoke, Michigan
- Mark Dantonio, Michigan State
- Jerry Kill, Minnesota
- Bo Pelini, Nebraska
- Pat Fitzgerald, Northwestern
- Urban Meyer, Ohio State
- Bill O'Brien, Penn State
- Darrell Hazell, Purdue
- Gary Andersen, Wisconsin
