= 2013 Purdue Boilermakers football team =

American college football season

2013 Purdue Boilermakers football
- Conference: Big Ten Conference
- Leaders Division
- Record: 1–11 (0–8 Big Ten)
- Head coach: Darrell Hazell (1st season)
- Offensive coordinator: John Shoop (1st season)
- Offensive scheme: Pro-Style
- Defensive coordinator: Greg Hudson (1st season)
- Base defense: 3–4 or 4–3
- Captains: Ricardo Allen; Rob Henry; Bruce Gaston
- Home stadium: Ross–Ade Stadium

2013 Big Ten Conference football standings
	Conf.			Overall
Team	W		L	W		L
Legends Division
No. 3 Michigan State x$	8	–	0	13	–	1
Iowa	5	–	3	8	–	5
Nebraska	5	–	3	9	–	4
Minnesota	4	–	4	8	–	5
Michigan	3	–	5	7	–	6
Northwestern	1	–	7	5	–	7
Leaders Division
No. 12 Ohio State x%	8	–	0	12	–	2
No. 22 Wisconsin	6	–	2	9	–	4
Penn State*	4	–	4	7	–	5
Indiana	3	–	5	5	–	7
Illinois	1	–	7	4	–	8
Purdue	0	–	8	1	–	11
Championship: Michigan State 34, Ohio State 24
$ – BCS representative as conference champion; % – BCS at-large representative; x – Division champion/co-champions; Penn State ineligible for conference championship game and post-season bowl games due to NCAA sanctions; Rankings from AP Poll

The 2013 Purdue Boilermakers football team was an American football team that represented Purdue University during the 2013 NCAA Division I FBS football season. The Boilermakers competed in the Leaders Division of the Big Ten Conference, and played their home games at Ross–Ade Stadium in West Lafayette, Indiana. Purdue was led by head coach Darrell Hazell, who was in his first season.

Purdue finished the season with a 1–11 record, 0–8 in Big Ten play, to finish in sixth place in the Leaders Division, failing to qualify for a bowl game. The team was the first Purdue team to go winless in conference play since the 1993 Purdue Boilermakers football team.

== Recruiting ==
=== Position key ===
Back	B	Center	C	Cornerback	CB	Defensive back	DB
Defensive end	DE	Defensive lineman	DL	Defensive tackle	DT	End	E
Fullback	FB	Guard	G	Halfback	HB	Kicker	K
Kickoff returner	KR	Offensive tackle	OT	Offensive lineman	OL	Linebacker	LB
Long snapper	LS	Punter	P	Punt returner	PR	Quarterback	QB
Running back	RB	Safety	S	Tight end	TE	Wide receiver	WR

=== Recruits ===
Purdue's recruiting class was ranked No. 57 by Scout No. 56 by Rivals and No. 50 by ESPN. The program received 23 letters of intent on National Signing Day, February 6, 2013. On June 13, Purdue signee, TyVel Jemison, decided to not attend Purdue and choose to enroll at Grand Valley State.

College recruiting
Name	Hometown	School	Height	Weight	40^{‡}	Commit date
Matt Burke; TE	West Palm Beach, Florida	Cardinal Newman H.S.	6 ft 6 in (1.98 m)	215 lb (98 kg)	4.8	Jan 22, 2013
Matt Burke; TE	Recruit ratings: Scout: Rivals: 247Sports: (67)					
Keith Byars II; RB	Boca Raton, Florida	Milford Academy	5 ft 10 in (1.78 m)	205 lb (93 kg)	–	Feb 3, 2013
Keith Byars II; RB	Recruit ratings: Scout: Rivals: 247Sports: (72)					
Leroy Clark; DB	Miami, Florida	Archbishop Coleman F. Carroll H.S.	5 ft 10 in (1.78 m)	169 lb (77 kg)	–	Dec 10, 2012
Leroy Clark; DB	Recruit ratings: Scout: Rivals: 247Sports: (82)					
Johnny Daniels; DT	Chicago, Illinois	Foreman H.S.	6 ft 5 in (1.96 m)	250 lb (110 kg)	–	Jan 27, 2013
Johnny Daniels; DT	Recruit ratings: Scout: Rivals: 247Sports: (69)					
Dalyn Dawkins; RB	Louisville, Kentucky	Trinity H.S.	5 ft 9 in (1.75 m)	175 lb (79 kg)	4.5	Feb 4, 2013
Dalyn Dawkins; RB	Recruit ratings: Scout: Rivals: 247Sports: (71)					
Danny Etling; QB	Terre Haute, Indiana	Terre Haute South Vigo H.S.	6 ft 3 in (1.91 m)	200 lb (91 kg)	–	Apr 17, 2012
Danny Etling; QB	Recruit ratings: Scout: Rivals: 247Sports: (83)					
Danny Ezechukwu; LB/DE	Lithonia, Georgia	Arabia Mountain H.S.	6 ft 2 in (1.88 m)	235 lb (107 kg)	–	Oct 15, 2012
Danny Ezechukwu; LB/DE	Recruit ratings: Scout: Rivals: 247Sports: (73)					
Keyante Green; RB	McDonough, Georgia	Eagle's Landing Christian Academy	5 ft 9 in (1.75 m)	190 lb (86 kg)	4.5	Jul 28, 2012
Keyante Green; RB	Recruit ratings: Scout: Rivals: 247Sports: (82)					
Ra'Zahn Howard; DT	Atco, New Jersey	Atlanta Sports Academy	6 ft 3 in (1.91 m)	275 lb (125 kg)	–	Nov 4, 2012
Ra'Zahn Howard; DT	Recruit ratings: Scout: Rivals: 247Sports: (74)					
Da'Wan Hunte; K	Miami, Florida	Miami Central H.S.	5 ft 10 in (1.78 m)	185 lb (84 kg)	–	Feb 6, 2013
Da'Wan Hunte; K	Recruit ratings: Scout: Rivals: 247Sports: (74)					
TyVel Jemison; CB	Fort Wayne, Indiana	Bishop Luers H.S.	5 ft 10 in (1.78 m)	175 lb (79 kg)	–	Feb 6, 2013
TyVel Jemison; CB	Recruit ratings: Scout: Rivals: 247Sports: (65)					
Austin Logan; DB	Tallahassee, Florida	Florida State University School	6 ft 1 in (1.85 m)	185 lb (84 kg)	4.6	Aug 1, 2012
Austin Logan; DB	Recruit ratings: Scout: Rivals: 247Sports: (78)					
Antoine Miles; DE/DT	Canton, Ohio	Canton McKinley H.S.	6 ft 3 in (1.91 m)	250 lb (110 kg)	5.1	Jan 20, 2013
Antoine Miles; DE/DT	Recruit ratings: Scout: Rivals: 247Sports: (77)					
Dan Monteroso; WR	Saint Clairsville, Ohio	St. Clairsville H.S.	6 ft 3 in (1.91 m)	180 lb (82 kg)	4.5	Jan 25, 2013
Dan Monteroso; WR	Recruit ratings: Scout: Rivals: 247Sports: (76)					
Myles Norwood; WR	Arlington, Texas	Grace Preparatory Academy	6 ft 2 in (1.88 m)	175 lb (79 kg)	–	Jul 17, 2012
Myles Norwood; WR	Recruit ratings: Scout: Rivals: 247Sports: (74)					
Evan Panfil; DE	New Lenox, Illinois	Lincoln-Way Central H.S.	6 ft 5 in (1.96 m)	230 lb (100 kg)	–	Jan 28, 2013
Evan Panfil; DE	Recruit ratings: Scout: Rivals: 247Sports: (75)					
Dezwan Polk-Campbell; LB	Columbus, Ohio	Whetstone H.S.	6 ft 4 in (1.93 m)	210 lb (95 kg)	4.6	Jan 19, 2013
Dezwan Polk-Campbell; LB	Recruit ratings: Scout: Rivals: 247Sports: (70)					
Jake Replogle; DE	Centerville, Ohio	Centerville H.S.	6 ft 4 in (1.93 m)	230 lb (100 kg)	–	Jun 29, 2012
Jake Replogle; DE	Recruit ratings: Scout: Rivals: 247Sports: (73)					
John Strauser; ATH	Champaign, Illinois	The H.S. of Saint Thomas More	6 ft 4 in (1.93 m)	235 lb (107 kg)	–	Jun 25, 2012
John Strauser; ATH	Recruit ratings: Scout: Rivals: 247Sports: (73)					
Johnny Thompson; LB/DE	Winder, Georgia	Apalachee H.S.	6 ft 2 in (1.88 m)	210 lb (95 kg)	–	Jul 20, 2012
Johnny Thompson; LB/DE	Recruit ratings: Scout: Rivals: 247Sports: (69)					
Jason Tretter; OL	Richfield, Ohio	Revere H.S.	6 ft 5 in (1.96 m)	250 lb (110 kg)	5.1	Jan 26, 2013
Jason Tretter; OL	Recruit ratings: Scout: Rivals: 247Sports: (74)					
David Yancey; ATH	Saint John, Indiana	Lake Central H.S.	5 ft 11 in (1.80 m)	200 lb (91 kg)	4.5	Jun 23, 2012
David Yancey; ATH	Recruit ratings: Scout: Rivals: 247Sports: (72)					
DeAngelo Yancey; WR	Atlanta, Georgia	Benjamin Elijah Mays H.S.	6 ft 2 in (1.88 m)	200 lb (91 kg)	4.5	Jan 26, 2013
DeAngelo Yancey; WR	Recruit ratings: Scout: Rivals: 247Sports: (76)					
Overall recruit ranking: Scout: 57 Rivals: 56 ESPN: 50
Note: In many cases, Scout, Rivals, 247Sports, On3, and ESPN may conflict in their listings of height and weight.; In these cases, the average was taken. ESPN grades are on a 100-point scale.; Sources: "Purdue Football Commitments". Rivals.; "2013 Purdue Football Commits". Scout.; "ESPN". ESPN.; "Scout.com Team Recruiting Rankings". Scout.; "2013 Team Ranking". Rivals.com.; "2013 Purdue Boilermakers football team". 247Sports.

== Schedule ==
Date	Time	Opponent	Site	TV	Result	Attendance
August 31	12:00 pm	at Cincinnati*	Nippert Stadium; Cincinnati, OH	ESPNU	L 7–42	36,007
September 7	12:00 pm	Indiana State*	Ross–Ade Stadium; West Lafayette, IN	BTN	W 20–14	50,165
September 14	8:00 pm	No. 21 Notre Dame*	Ross–Ade Stadium; West Lafayette, IN (Battle for the Shillelagh Trophy)	ABC	L 24–31	61,127
September 21	3:30 pm	at No. 24 Wisconsin	Camp Randall Stadium; Madison, WI	ABC	L 10–41	80,772
September 28	12:00 pm	Northern Illinois*^{†}	Ross–Ade Stadium; West Lafayette, IN	ESPN2	L 24–55	54,258
October 12	12:00 pm	Nebraska	Ross–Ade Stadium; West Lafayette, IN	BTN	L 7–44	47,203
October 19	12:00 pm	at Michigan State	Spartan Stadium; East Lansing, MI	BTN	L 0–14	71,514
November 2	12:00 pm	No. 4 Ohio State	Ross–Ade Stadium; West Lafayette, IN	BTN	L 0–56	51,423
November 9	12:00 pm	Iowa	Ross–Ade Stadium; West Lafayette, IN	BTN	L 14–38	41,038
November 16	12:00 pm	at Penn State	Beaver Stadium; University Park, PA	BTN	L 21–45	96,491
November 23	12:00 pm	Illinois	Ross–Ade Stadium; West Lafayette, IN (Battle for the Purdue Cannon)	BTN	L 16–20	37,459
November 30	3:30 pm	at Indiana	Memorial Stadium; Bloomington, IN (Old Oaken Bucket Game)	BTN	L 36–56	44,882
*Non-conference game; ^{†}Homecoming; Rankings from AP Poll released prior to the game; All times are in Eastern time

== Roster ==
2013 Purdue Boilermakers football team roster
Players
Coaches
Offense

Pos.	#	Name	Class
RB	1	Akeem Hunt	Jr
RB	2	Jonathan Curry	Fr
TE	3	Carlos Carvajal	Fr
RB	4	Keith Byers II	Fr
QB	5	Danny Etling	Fr
WR	6	Gary Bush	Sr
RB	7	Robert Gregory	Fr
RB	8	Raheem Mostert	Jr
WR	9	Dan Monteroso	Fr
TE	10	Matt Burke	Fr
QB	11	Austin Parker	So
QB	12	Austin Appleby	Fr
QB	13	Erich Berzinskas	So
WR	14	Bilal Marshall	Fr
WR	16	Dolapo McCarthy	Jr
QB	17	Ti Domhoff	Fr
WR	17	Charles Torwudzo	Jr
WR	18	Camerson Posey	Fr
WR	19	Alyois Gray	Fr
RB	20	Dalyn Dawkins	Fr
WR	22	E. J. Johnson	Jr
RB	23	Keyante Green	Fr
RB	25	Brandon Cottom	Jr
RB	28	David Yancey	Fr
WR	33	Danny Anthrop	So
RB	35	Pete Hartley	Fr
WR	38	Kyle Marzec	Fr
FB	40	Kendrick Adams	Jr
TE	43	Jacob Anderson	Fr
FB	46	Kurt Freytag	Sr
TE	47	Micah Budzinski	Fr
OT	51	Justin Kitchens	Sr
C	52	Henry Lorenzen	Sr
OT	54	Jack DeBoef	Jr
C	57	Robert Kugler	So
C	59	Cody Davis	Sr
OT	64	Kevin Pamphile	Sr
OL	65	Charlie Long	Fr
OL	66	Cameron Cermin	Fr
G	70	Jordan Roos	Fr
G	71	Devin Smith	Sr
G	72	Jason King	Fr
OT	73	J. J. Prince	Fr
OT	75	Josh Davis	Jr
OL	76	Jason Tretter	Fr
OT	77	Joey Warburg	Fr
G	78	Trevor Foy	Sr
OT	79	Michael Rouse III	So
WR	80	DeAngelo Yancey	Fr
TE	81	Sterling Carter	Sr
WR	82	Myles Norwood	Fr
WR	83	B. J. Knauf	Fr
TE	84	Justin Sinz	Jr
TE	85	Ryan Morris	Fr
TE	86	Gabe Holmes	Sr
WR	87	Shane Mikesky	So
WR	88	Jordan Woods	Fr
TE	89	Patrick Bade	Sr

Defense

Pos.	#	Name	Class
CB	1	Normando Harris	Sr
LB	2	Andy James Garcia	Fr
DB	3	Leroy Clark	Fr
DB	4	Taylor Richards	Jr
S	5	Austin Logan	Fr
LB	6	Ruben Ibarra	Sr
DB	9	Anthony Brown	So
LB	10	Sean Robinson	Sr
CB	11	Landau Lang	Jr
S	15	Ashkan Mizani	Fr
LB	16	Garret Hudson	Fr
CB	21	Ricardo Allen (C)	Sr
S	22	Rob Henry (C)	Sr
CB	22	DaWan Hunt	Fr
DB	24	Frankie Williams	So
DB	25	Phil Taylor	So
CB	26	Antoine Lewis	Jr
S	27	Evan Feichter	Fr
LB	29	Jimmy Herman	Fr
LB	31	Armstead Williams	So
LB	32	Evan Pulliam	Fr
LB	34	Dezwan Polk-Campbell	Fr
LB	35	Johnny Thompson	Fr
LB	36	Danny Ezechukwa	Fr
DB	37	Race Johnson	Fr
LB	39	Joe Gilliam	Jr
LB	40	Collin Link	Jr
LB	41	Tylor Foster	Sr
S	44	Landon Feichter	Jr
LB	45	Will Lucas	Sr
DE	48	Jules Williams	Jr
DE	51	John Strauser	Fr
DT	52	Johnny Daniels	Fr
DE	54	Jake Replogle	Fr
DE	55	Antoine Miles	Fr
DT	60	Chuck Ayres	So
DT	61	Ryan Isaac	Jr
DE	85	Will Schott	Fr
DE	89	Jalani Phillips	Jr
DT	90	Bruce Gaston (C)	Sr
DE	91	Greg Latta	Sr
DT	92	Ryan Watson	So
DT	93	Ra'Zahn Howard	Fr
DE	95	Evan Panfil	Fr
DT	98	Eric McDaniel	Sr
DE	99	Ryan Russell	Jr

Special teams

Pos.	#	Name	Class
K	30	Thomas Meadows	So
K	37	Paul Griggs	So
P	42	Cody Webster	Sr
K	43	Sam McCartney	So
LS	50	Jesse Schmitt	Jr
LS	53	John Bednar	Fr
LS	94	Grant Ellington	So

Head coach

- Darrell Hazell

Coordinators/assistant coaches

- John Shoop (Offensive Coordinator / Quarterbacks)
- Greg Hudson (Defensive Coordinator)
- Jim Bridge (Offensive Line)
- Rubin Carter (Defensive Line)
- Marcus Freeman (Linebackers)
- Jon Heacock (Defensive Backs)
- Gerad Parker (Tight Ends / Recruiting Coordinator)
- Kevin Sherman (Wide Receivers)
- Jafar Williams (Running Backs)
- Ryan Crow (Offensive Graduate Assistant)
- Logan Link (Defensive Graduate Assistant)
- Brian Mason (Defensive Graduate Assistant)
- Doug Boersma (Director of Sports Medicine)
- Duane Carlisle (Director of Sports Performance)
- Tommy Cook (Supervisor of Football Operations)
- Doug Davis (Senior Associate Director of Sports Performance)
- Mike Lee (Undergraduate Assistant Coach)
- Kevin Maurice (Assistant Recruiting Coordinator)
- Casey Nuss (High School Relations Director)
- Jordan Shine (Undergraduate Assistant Coach)

Legend

- (C) Team captain
- (S) Suspended
- (I) Ineligible
- Injured
- Redshirt

Roster
Last update: October 22, 2013
