= 2013 Minnesota Golden Gophers football team =

American college football season

2013 Minnesota Golden Gophers football

Texas Bowl, L 17–21 vs. Syracuse
- Conference: Big Ten Conference
- Legends Division
- Record: 8–5 (4–4 Big Ten)
- Head coach: Jerry Kill (3rd season)
- Offensive coordinator: Matt Limegrover (3rd season)
- Offensive scheme: Spread
- Defensive coordinator: Tracy Claeys (3rd season)
- Base defense: 4–3
- Captains: Josh Campion; Aaron Hill; Brock Vereen; Ra'Shede Hageman
- Home stadium: TCF Bank Stadium

2013 Big Ten Conference football standings
| | Conf. | | | Overall |
| Team | W | | L | W | | L |
|---|---|---|---|---|---|---|
Legends Division
| No. 3 Michigan State x$ | 8 | – | 0 | 13 | – | 1 |
| Iowa | 5 | – | 3 | 8 | – | 5 |
| Nebraska | 5 | – | 3 | 9 | – | 4 |
| Minnesota | 4 | – | 4 | 8 | – | 5 |
| Michigan | 3 | – | 5 | 7 | – | 6 |
| Northwestern | 1 | – | 7 | 5 | – | 7 |
Leaders Division
| No. 12 Ohio State x% | 8 | – | 0 | 12 | – | 2 |
| No. 22 Wisconsin | 6 | – | 2 | 9 | – | 4 |
| Penn State* | 4 | – | 4 | 7 | – | 5 |
| Indiana | 3 | – | 5 | 5 | – | 7 |
| Illinois | 1 | – | 7 | 4 | – | 8 |
| Purdue | 0 | – | 8 | 1 | – | 11 |
Championship: Michigan State 34, Ohio State 24
$ – BCS representative as conference champion; % – BCS at-large representative; x – Division champion/co-champions; Penn State ineligible for conference championship game and post-season bowl games due to NCAA sanctions; Rankings from AP Poll

The 2013 Minnesota Golden Gophers football team represented the University of Minnesota in the 2013 NCAA Division I FBS football season. They were led by third-year head coach Jerry Kill and played their home games at TCF Bank Stadium. They were a member of the Legends Division of the Big Ten Conference.

== Schedule ==
| Date | Time | Opponent | Rank | Site | TV | Result | Attendance |
|---|---|---|---|---|---|---|---|
| August 29 | 6:00 pm | UNLV* | | TCF Bank Stadium; Minneapolis, MN | BTN | W 51–23 | 44,217 |
| September 7 | 7:00 pm | at New Mexico State* | | Aggie Memorial Stadium; Las Cruces, NM | | W 44–21 | 16,418 |
| September 14 | 11:00 am | Western Illinois* | | TCF Bank Stadium; Minneapolis, MN | BTN | W 29–12 | 42,127 |
| September 21 | 11:00 am | San Jose State* | | TCF Bank Stadium; Minneapolis, MN | ESPN2 | W 43–24 | 45,647 |
| September 28 | 2:30 pm | Iowa^{†} | | TCF Bank Stadium; Minneapolis, MN (rivalry) | ABC/ESPN2 | L 7–23 | 51,382 |
| October 5 | 2:30 pm | at No. 17 Michigan | | Michigan Stadium; Ann Arbor, MI (Little Brown Jug) | ABC/ESPN2 | L 13–42 | 111,079 |
| October 19 | 11:00 am | at Northwestern | | Ryan Field; Evanston, IL | ESPN2 | W 20–17 | 36,578 |
| October 26 | 11:00 am | No. 21 Nebraska | | TCF Bank Stadium; Minneapolis, MN | ESPN | W 34–23 | 49,995 |
| November 2 | 2:30 pm | at Indiana | | Memorial Stadium; Bloomington, IN | BTN | W 42–39 | 44,625 |
| November 9 | 11:00 am | Penn State | | TCF Bank Stadium; Minneapolis, MN (Governor's Victory Bell) | ESPN2 | W 24–10 | 48,123 |
| November 23 | 2:30 pm | No. 17 Wisconsin | No. 23 | TCF Bank Stadium; Minneapolis, MN (rivalry) | ESPN | L 7–20 | 53,090 |
| November 30 | 11:00 am | at No. 11 Michigan State | | Spartan Stadium; East Lansing, MI | BTN | L 3–14 | 71,418 |
| December 27 | 5:00 pm | vs. Syracuse* | | Reliant Stadium; Houston, TX (Texas Bowl) | ESPN | L 17–21 | 32,327 |
*Non-conference game; ^{†}Homecoming; Rankings from Coaches' Poll released prior to the game; All times are in Central time

== Rankings ==
Ranking movements Legend: ██ Increase in ranking ██ Decrease in ranking — = Not ranked RV = Received votes
| | Week | | | | | | | | | | | | | | | | |
| Poll | Pre | 1 | 2 | 3 | 4 | 5 | 6 | 7 | 8 | 9 | 10 | 11 | 12 | 13 | 14 | 15 | Final |
|---|---|---|---|---|---|---|---|---|---|---|---|---|---|---|---|---|---|
| AP | — | — | — | — | — | — | — | — | — | RV | RV | RV | RV | RV | RV | RV | — |
| Coaches | — | — | — | — | RV | — | — | — | — | RV | RV | 25 | 23 | RV | RV | RV | — |
| Harris | Not released | | | | | | | — | — | RV | RV | RV | 25 | — | RV | RV | Not released |
| BCS | Not released | | | | | | | | — | — | — | — | 25 | — | — | — | Not released |

== Before the season ==
The Gophers had their first, full intrasquad scrimmage during the Spring Game under Kill's tenure; his previous two Spring Games had been limited in scope. The game attracted 8,400 fans, the largest attendance for a Gophers Spring Game since Lou Holtz coached the team in the mid-1980s.

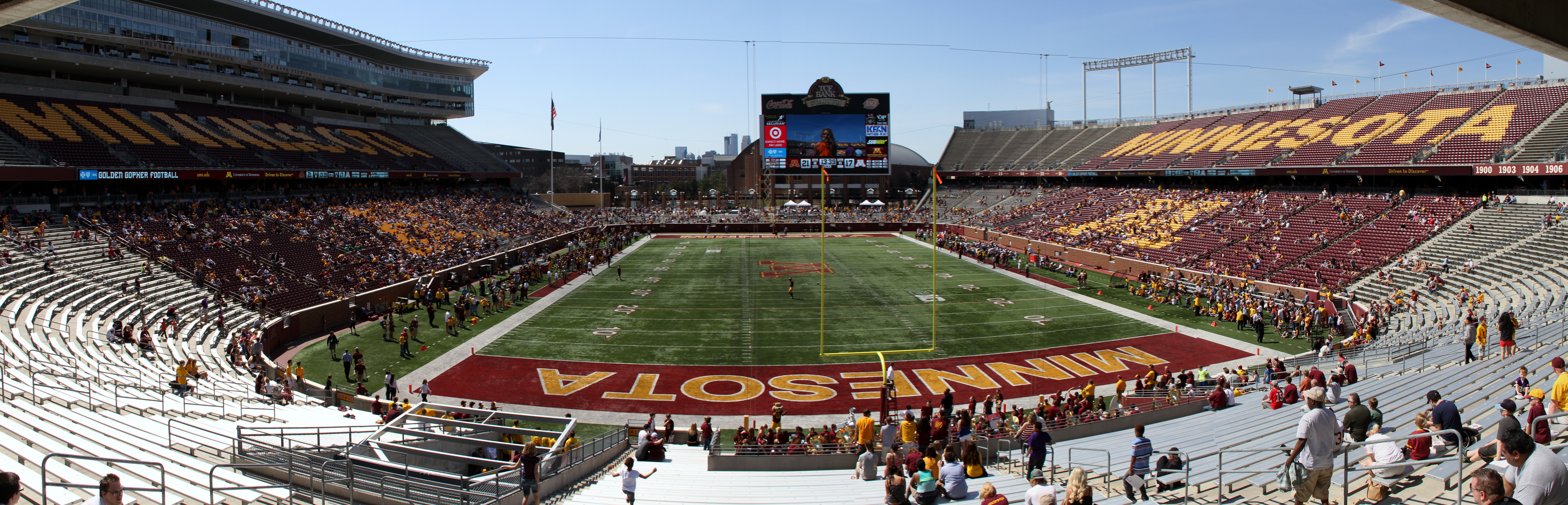
The 2013 Minnesota Spring Game had the highest attendance since the 1980s.

== Game summaries ==
=== UNLV ===
| | 1 | 2 | 3 | 4 | Total |
|---|---|---|---|---|---|
| Rebels | 6 | 7 | 3 | 7 | 23 |
| Golden Gophers | 3 | 13 | 14 | 21 | 51 |

=== New Mexico State ===
| | 1 | 2 | 3 | 4 | Total |
|---|---|---|---|---|---|
| Golden Gophers | 3 | 24 | 3 | 14 | 44 |
| Aggies | 0 | 7 | 7 | 7 | 21 |

=== Western Illinois ===
| | 1 | 2 | 3 | 4 | Total |
|---|---|---|---|---|---|
| Leathernecks | 6 | 0 | 6 | 0 | 12 |
| Golden Gophers | 0 | 7 | 8 | 14 | 29 |

=== San Jose State ===
| | 1 | 2 | 3 | 4 | Total |
|---|---|---|---|---|---|
| Spartans | 0 | 17 | 0 | 7 | 24 |
| Golden Gophers | 7 | 13 | 9 | 14 | 43 |

=== Iowa ===
| | 1 | 2 | 3 | 4 | Total |
|---|---|---|---|---|---|
| Hawkeyes | 3 | 14 | 3 | 3 | 23 |
| Golden Gophers | 0 | 0 | 7 | 0 | 7 |

=== Michigan ===
| | 1 | 2 | 3 | 4 | Total |
|---|---|---|---|---|---|
| Golden Gophers | 7 | 0 | 3 | 3 | 13 |
| #17 Wolverines | 7 | 7 | 14 | 14 | 42 |

=== Northwestern ===
| | 1 | 2 | 3 | 4 | Total |
|---|---|---|---|---|---|
| Golden Gophers | 0 | 7 | 7 | 6 | 20 |
| Wildcats | 7 | 0 | 0 | 10 | 17 |

=== Nebraska ===
The game was Minnesota's first win against Nebraska since a 26–14 victory on September 24, 1960.

| | 1 | 2 | 3 | 4 | Total |
|---|---|---|---|---|---|
| #21 Cornhuskers | 10 | 3 | 7 | 3 | 23 |
| Golden Gophers | 7 | 10 | 10 | 7 | 34 |

=== Indiana ===
| | 1 | 2 | 3 | 4 | Total |
|---|---|---|---|---|---|
| Golden Gophers | 7 | 21 | 7 | 7 | 42 |
| Hoosiers | 10 | 3 | 7 | 19 | 39 |

=== Penn State ===
| | 1 | 2 | 3 | 4 | Total |
|---|---|---|---|---|---|
| Nittany Lions | 7 | 3 | 0 | 0 | 10 |
| Golden Gophers | 10 | 14 | 0 | 0 | 24 |

=== Wisconsin ===
| | 1 | 2 | 3 | 4 | Total |
|---|---|---|---|---|---|
| #17 Badgers | 3 | 10 | 7 | 0 | 20 |
| #23 Golden Gophers | 0 | 7 | 0 | 0 | 7 |

=== Michigan State ===
| | 1 | 2 | 3 | 4 | Total |
|---|---|---|---|---|---|
| Golden Gophers | 0 | 3 | 0 | 0 | 3 |
| #11 Spartans | 7 | 0 | 7 | 0 | 14 |

=== Syracuse (Texas Bowl) ===
| | 1 | 2 | 3 | 4 | Total |
|---|---|---|---|---|---|
| Orange | 0 | 7 | 7 | 7 | 21 |
| Golden Gophers | 0 | 3 | 0 | 14 | 17 |

== Roster ==
2013 Minnesota Golden Gophers football team roster
Players
Coaches
Offense

| Pos. | # | Name | Class |
|---|---|---|---|
| WR | 1 | K.J. Maye | So |
| QB | 3 | Dexter Foreman | So |
| QB | 5 | Chris Streveler | Fr |
| QB | 6 | Donovahn Jones | Fr |
| QB | 7 | Mitch Leidner | Fr |
| WR | 8 | Cameron Wilson | Jr |
| QB | 9 | Philip Nelson | So |
| WR | 11 | Eric Carter | Fr |
| WR | 12 | Andre McDonald | So |
| WR | 14 | Isaac Fruechte | Jr |
| QB | 15 | Conor Rhoda | Fr |
| WR | 16 | Jamel Harbison | Fr |
| WR | 17 | Logan Hutton | Jr |
| WR | 18 | Derrick Engel | Sr |
| QB | 19 | Michael Conway | Fr |
| RB | 20 | Donnell Kirkwood | Jr |
| RB | 21 | James Gillum | Sr |
| WR | 22 | Jeff Borchardt | Fr |
| WR | 23 | E.J. Sardinha | Fr |
| WR | 24 | Aaron Marmer | So |
| RB | 25 | Devon Wright | Jr |
| WR | 26 | Brian Smith | Fr |
| RB | 27 | David Cobb | So |
| FB | 30 | Mike Henry | Sr |
| RB | 31 | Cole Banham | Jr |
| RB | 32 | Berkley Edwards | Fr |
| RB | 35 | Rodrick Williams | So |
| TE | 39 | Nate Wozniak | Fr |
| RB | 42 | JoJuan Harper | So |
| FB | 43 | Tyler Hartmann | Fr |
| TE | 44 | Gabe Mezzenga | Jr |
| TE | 45 | Nick Hart | Fr |
| TE | 47 | Alex Bisch | Jr |
| G | 52 | Zac Epping | Jr |
| G | 53 | Tommy Olson | Jr |
| OT | 58 | Ed Olson | Sr |
| OL | 60 | Matt Leidner | Fr |
| OC | 62 | Zach Mottla | Sr |
| OL | 63 | Jon Christenson | So |
| G | 64 | Caleb Bak | Jr |
| OL | 65 | Josh Campion | So |
| OL | 66 | Luke McAvoy | So |
| OC | 67 | Brian Bobek | Jr |
| OL | 68 | Issac Hayes | Fr |
| OL | 70 | Chad Fahning | Fr |
| OL | 71 | Kyle McAvoy | So |
| OL | 73 | Joe Bjorklund | So |
| OL | 74 | Marek Lenkiewicz | Jr |
| OL | 75 | Ernie Heifort | So |
| OL | 76 | Alex Mayes | Fr |
| OL | 77 | Foster Bush | So |
| OT | 78 | Ben Lauer | Fr |
| OT | 79 | Jonah Pirsig | Fr |
| WR | 80 | Devin Crawford-Tufts | Jr |
| TE | 81 | Duke Anyanwu | Fr |
| WR | 82 | Drew Wolitarsky | Fr |
| TE | 83 | Drew Goodger | Jr |
| WR | 84 | Victor Keise | Sr |
| TE | 85 | Lincoln Plsek | So |
| TE | 86 | Moses Alipate | Sr |
| TE | 87 | Sahr Ngekia | Sr |
| TE | 88 | Maxx Williams | Fr |
| WR | 89 | Ben Holcomb | Fr |

Defense

| Pos. | # | Name | Class |
|---|---|---|---|
| LB | 1 | Brendan Beal | Sr |
| DB | 2 | Cedric Thompson | Jr |
| DB | 3 | Martez Shabazz | Sr |
| LB | 5 | Damien Wilson | Jr |
| DB | 6 | Grayson Levine | Jr |
| DB | 7 | Damarius Travis | So |
| DB | 8 | Daletavious McGhee | Fr |
| LB | 9 | James Manuel | Sr |
| DB | 11 | Antonio Johnson | So |
| DB | 13 | Derrick Wells | Jr |
| DB | 15 | Marcus Jones | Jr |
| DB | 16 | Steven Montgomery | So |
| LB | 18 | Peter Westerhaus | So |
| DB | 19 | Cedric Dicke | Fr |
| DB | 21 | Brock Vereen | Sr |
| DB | 22 | Jeremy Baltazar | Sr |
| LB | 26 | De'Vondre Campbell | So |
| DB | 28 | Jalen Myrick | Fr |
| DB | 29 | Briean Boddy | Jr |
| LB | 30 | Chris Wipson | Fr |
| DB | 31 | Eric Murray | So |
| DB | 33 | John McKelvey | Fr |
| LB | 34 | Jephte Matilus | So |
| LB | 35 | Dominic Schultz | So |
| DB | 36 | Cavonte Johnson | Fr |
| DB | 37 | Aaron Roundtree | So |
| LB | 38 | De'Niro Laster | Fr |
| DB | 40 | Alexander Starks | Fr |
| DB | 45 | Adekunle Ayinde | Fr |
| DT | 46 | Cameron Botticelli | Jr |
| DE | 49 | Owen Salzwedel | Fr |
| LB | 50 | Jack Lynn | Fr |
| DT | 52 | Yoshoub Timms | Fr |
| DE | 55 | Thieren Cockran | So |
| LB | 56 | Nick Rallis | Fr |
| LB | 57 | Aaron Hill | Sr |
| LB | 59 | Ray Dixon | Fr |
| DL | 69 | Robert Ndondo-Lane | Jr |
| DT | 90 | Demaris Peppers | Fr |
| DE | 91 | Alex Keith | So |
| DT | 92 | Roland Johnson | Sr |
| DE | 93 | Ben Perry | Jr |
| DT | 94 | Harold Legania | Jr |
| DL | 95 | Hendrick Ekpe | Fr |
| DT | 96 | Jordan Hinojosa | So |
| DT | 97 | Scott Ekpe | So |
| DE | 98 | Michael Amaefula | Jr |
| DT | 99 | Ra'Shede Hageman | Sr |

Special teams

| Pos. | # | Name | Class |
|---|---|---|---|
| K | 24 | Kyle Fodness | Fr |
| K | 28 | Ryan Santoso | Fr |
| K | 33 | Andrew Harte | Fr |
| K | 36 | Chris Hawthorne | Sr |
| P | 37 | Peter Mortell | So |
| LS | 40 | Jared Hartman | So |
| P | 41 | Dan Oreske | Sr |
| K | 42 | Justin Juenemann | Fr |
| LS | 48 | Jake Filkins | Sr |
| P | 94 | Christian Eldred | Jr |
| LS | 96 | Dave Ramlet | Jr |

Head coach

- Jerry Kill

Coordinators/assistant coaches

- Matt Limegrover (offensive coordinator)
- Tracy Claeys (defensive coordinator)
- Bill Miller (assistant head coach / linebackers)
- Brian Anderson (running backs)
- Jeff Phelps (defensive line)
- Pat Poore (wide receivers)
- Rob Reeves (H-backs / tight ends)
- Jay Sawvel (defensive backs / special teams)
- Jim Zebrowski (quarterbacks)
- Ryan Maiuri (graduate assistant)

Legend

- (C) Team captain
- (S) Suspended
- (I) Ineligible
- Injured
- Redshirt

Roster
Last update: November 19, 2012

== Players drafted into the NFL ==
| Round | Pick | Player | Position | NFL club |
|---|---|---|---|---|
| 2 | 37 | Ra'Shede Hageman | DT | Atlanta Falcons |
| 4 | 131 | Brock Vereen | FS | Chicago Bears |
