= 2013 Big Ten Football Championship Game =

- Conference Championship
Ohio State Buckeyes	Michigan State Spartans
(12–0)	(11–1)
24	34
Head coach: Urban Meyer	Head coach: Mark Dantonio
AP / Coaches / BCS; 2 / 2 / 2	AP / Coaches / BCS; 10 / 9 / 10
	1	2	3	4	Total
Ohio State	0	10	14	0	24
Michigan State	3	14	3	14	34
- Date: December 7, 2013
- Season: 2013
- Stadium: Lucas Oil Stadium
- Location: Indianapolis, IN
- MVP: Connor Cook (MSU)
- Favorite: Ohio State by 5.5
- National anthem: Ohio State University Marching Band and Michigan State University Spartan Marching Band
- Referee: Dan Capron
- Attendance: 66,002

United States TV coverage
- Network: Fox
- Announcers: Gus Johnson and Charles Davis
- Nielsen ratings: 7.9 (13.9 million viewers)

2013 Big Ten Conference football standings
	Conf.			Overall
Team	W		L	W		L
Legends Division
No. 3 Michigan State x$	8	–	0	13	–	1
Iowa	5	–	3	8	–	5
Nebraska	5	–	3	9	–	4
Minnesota	4	–	4	8	–	5
Michigan	3	–	5	7	–	6
Northwestern	1	–	7	5	–	7
Leaders Division
No. 12 Ohio State x%	8	–	0	12	–	2
No. 22 Wisconsin	6	–	2	9	–	4
Penn State*	4	–	4	7	–	5
Indiana	3	–	5	5	–	7
Illinois	1	–	7	4	–	8
Purdue	0	–	8	1	–	11
Championship: Michigan State 34, Ohio State 24
$ – BCS representative as conference champion; % – BCS at-large representative; x – Division champion/co-champions; Penn State ineligible for conference championship game and post-season bowl games due to NCAA sanctions; Rankings from AP Poll

The 2013 Big Ten Football Championship Game was a college football game that was played on December 7, 2013, at Lucas Oil Stadium in Indianapolis, Indiana. It was the third annual Big Ten Football Championship Game, and determined the 2013 champion of the Big Ten Conference (B1G). The game featured the Leaders Division champion Ohio State Buckeyes against the Legends Division champion Michigan State Spartans. Michigan State defeated Ohio State 34–24, to win the Big Ten Championship, and represent the conference in the 100th Rose Bowl game on January 1, 2014. The upset loss kept Ohio State out of the BCS National Championship game.

== History ==
The 2013 Championship Game was the third held in the Big Ten Conference in the Big Ten's 118-year history. The previous season, the unranked Wisconsin Badgers represented the Leaders division, despite having a worse record than fellow division members Ohio State and Penn State, both of which were banned from post-season play. The #14 ranked Nebraska Cornhuskers represented the Legends division, having only lost one game to undefeated Ohio State. That game ended 70–31 in Wisconsin's favor.

2013 marked the first appearance of Ohio State to the conference championship game, whereas it was Michigan State's second appearance. Prior to this game, the Leaders division was undefeated. Conversely, the lower-ranked opponent had won both prior matchups. After this season, the Legends and Leaders divisions were replaced with Eastern and Western divisions.

== Teams ==
=== Ohio State ===
Ohio State came into 2013 ranked the #2 team in the nation, and their regular season results supported that claim. Having gone undefeated in 2012 but being denied a chance to compete for the Big Ten title or the BCS National Championship due to NCAA sanctions, Ohio State took care of business in 2013 by going 12–0 in regular season play. Many of their wins were by large margins, including a 76–0 win over Florida A&M, a 56–0 victory against Purdue, and a 63–14 triumph over Penn State. That result was the most points Penn State had allowed since giving up 64 to the Duquesne Country and Athletic Club in 1899, and the Ohio State offense set a new record for yards gained against Penn State with that game. In addition, Ohio State overcame ranked opponents in two consecutive weeks—first defeating #23 Wisconsin in Columbus, then traveling to Evanston, Illinois, to upend #16 Northwestern in a thriller under the lights. In their final game of the season, Ohio State defeated rival Michigan, surviving a last-second two-point conversion attempt by the Wolverines to hang on for a 42–41 victory.

The Buckeyes were led by their high-scoring offense. Ohio State averaged 48.2 points per game, the highest total in the Big Ten, and third highest in the NCAA. Their offensive strength was their rushing game, which ranked second nationally and first in the Big Ten with 321.3 yards per game. Overall, the offense averaged 530.5 yards per game, sixth-best in the NCAA and again leading the Big Ten. Running back Carlos Hyde, who was suspended from the first three games of the season, finished the season with 1,290 yards, the first running back under Urban Meyer to top 1,000 yards in a season. Quarterback Braxton Miller also contributed heavily to the Buckeye rushing attack; Miller and Hyde combined for over 1,000 yards rushing and 13 touchdowns in the last three games of the season. Receivers Corey Brown and Devin Smith both had over 600 receiving yards to round out the Ohio State offense, which set a new school record with 35 passing touchdowns in a season.

Defensively, Ohio State was also very strong, particularly against the run. Coming into the game, Ohio State was one of two teams to not allow an opposing player to rush for 100 or more yards (the other being Syracuse). The total average yards per game allowed by opposing rushers was 100.0 at the end of the regular season, the fifth best total in the NCAA. Not only did Ryan Shazier lead the Buckeye defense as a junior linebacker, he also led the Big Ten in tackles, tackles for loss, and forced fumbles. Noah Spence was second in sacks in the Big Ten with 8 coming into this game. All-American cornerback Bradley Roby anchored the Buckeye backfield.

== Scoring summary ==
1st quarter scoring:

- MSU: 40-yard field goal by Michael Geiger (8:31) (3–0 MSU)

2nd quarter scoring:

- MSU: 72-yard touchdown pass by Connor Cook to Keith Mumphery (Geiger kick) (14:50) (10–0 MSU)
- MSU: 33-yard touchdown pass by Connor Cook to Tony Lippett (Geiger kick) (9:01) (17–0 MSU)
- OSU: 20-yard touchdown pass by Braxton Miller to Philly Brown (Basil kick) (6:26) (17–7 MSU)
- OSU: 28-yard field goal by Drew Basil (0:00) (17–10 MSU)

3rd quarter scoring:

- OSU: 8-yard touchdown run by Braxton Miller (Basil kick) (12:21) (17–17 tie)
- OSU: 6-yard touchdown run by Braxton Miller (Basil kick) (5:36) (24–17 OSU)
- MSU: 24-yard field goal by Michael Geiger (2:29) (24–20 OSU)

4th quarter scoring:

- MSU: 9-yard touchdown pass by Connor Cook to Josiah Price (Geiger kick) (11:41) (27–24 MSU)
- MSU: 26-yard touchdown run by Jeremy Langford (Geiger kick) (2:16) (34–24 MSU)

=== Statistics ===
Statistics	OSU	MSU
First downs	20	23
Total offense, plays – yards	63–374	72–438
Rushes-yards (net)	40–273	32–134
Passing yards (net)	101	304
Passes, Comp-Att-Int	8–23–1	24–40–0
Time of Possession	27:09	32:51

== See also ==
- List of Big Ten Conference football champions
