= 2013 Northwestern Wildcats football team =

American college football season

2013 Northwestern Wildcats football
- Conference: Big Ten Conference
- Legends Division
- Record: 5–7 (1–7 Big Ten)
- Head coach: Pat Fitzgerald (8th season)
- Offensive coordinator: Mick McCall (6th season)
- Offensive scheme: Spread
- Defensive coordinator: Mike Hankwitz (6th season)
- Base defense: Multiple 4–3
- Captains: Kain Colter; Rashad Lawrence; Damien Proby; Tyler Scott; Brandon Vitabile
- Home stadium: Ryan Field

2013 Big Ten Conference football standings
	Conf.			Overall
Team	W		L	W		L
Legends Division
No. 3 Michigan State x$	8	–	0	13	–	1
Iowa	5	–	3	8	–	5
Nebraska	5	–	3	9	–	4
Minnesota	4	–	4	8	–	5
Michigan	3	–	5	7	–	6
Northwestern	1	–	7	5	–	7
Leaders Division
No. 12 Ohio State x%	8	–	0	12	–	2
No. 22 Wisconsin	6	–	2	9	–	4
Penn State*	4	–	4	7	–	5
Indiana	3	–	5	5	–	7
Illinois	1	–	7	4	–	8
Purdue	0	–	8	1	–	11
Championship: Michigan State 34, Ohio State 24
$ – BCS representative as conference champion; % – BCS at-large representative; x – Division champion/co-champions; Penn State ineligible for conference championship game and post-season bowl games due to NCAA sanctions; Rankings from AP Poll

The 2013 Northwestern Wildcats football team represented Northwestern University during the 2013 NCAA Division I FBS football season. Pat Fitzgerald, in his eighth season at Northwestern, was the team's head coach. The Wildcats home games were played at Ryan Field in Evanston, Illinois. They were members of the Legends Division of the Big Ten Conference.

== Personnel ==
=== Coaching staff ===
Name	Position	Seasons at Northwestern	Alma mater
Pat Fitzgerald	Head coach	8	Northwestern (1996)
Mick McCall	Offensive coordinator/quarterbacks	6	Southern Colorado (1978)
Mike Hankwitz	Defensive coordinator	6	Michigan (1970)
Randy Bates	Linebackers	7	Ohio State (1983)
Jerry Brown	Defensive Backs/Assistant head coach	20	Northwestern (1972)
Adam Cushing	Offensive line	3	Chicago (2002)
Bob Heffner	Superbacks	4	Temple (1979)
Marty Long	Defensive line	4	The Citadel (1986)
Matt MacPherson	Running backs/recruiting coordinator	7	DePauw (1993)
Dennis Springer	Wide receivers	2	Butler (1993)

== Schedule ==
Date	Time	Opponent	Rank	Site	TV	Result	Attendance
August 31	9:30 pm	at California*	No. 22	California Memorial Stadium; Berkeley, CA	ESPN2	W 44–30	58,816
September 7	5:00 pm	Syracuse*	No. 19	Ryan Field; Evanston, IL	BTN	W 48–27	38,033
September 14	8:00 pm	Western Michigan*	No. 17	Ryan Field; Evanston, IL	BTN	W 38–17	33,128
September 21	2:30 pm	Maine*	No. 18	Ryan Field; Evanston, IL	BTN	W 35–21	32,726
October 5	7:00 pm	No. 4 Ohio State^{†}	No. 16	Ryan Field; Evanston, IL (College GameDay)	ABC	L 30–40	47,330
October 12	2:30 pm	at Wisconsin	No. 19	Camp Randall Stadium; Madison, WI	ABC/ESPN2	L 6–35	81,411
October 19	11:00 am	Minnesota		Ryan Field; Evanston, IL	ESPN2	L 17–20	36,578
October 26	11:00 am	at Iowa		Kinnick Stadium; Iowa City, IA	BTN	L 10–17 ^{OT}	66,838
November 2	2:30 pm	at Nebraska		Memorial Stadium; Lincoln, NE	BTN	L 24–27	91,140
November 16	3:30 pm	Michigan		Ryan Field; Evanston, IL (rivalry)	BTN	L 19–27 ^{3OT}	47,330
November 23	11:00 am	No. 13 Michigan State		Ryan Field; Evanston, IL	ESPN	L 6–30	40,013
November 30	2:30 pm	at Illinois		Memorial Stadium; Champaign, IL (Battle for the Land of Lincoln Trophy)	BTN	W 37–34	37,058
*Non-conference game; ^{†}Homecoming; Rankings from AP Poll released prior to the game; All times are in Central time

== Game summaries ==
=== California ===
	1	2	3	4	Total
#22 Wildcats	7	10	10	17	44
Golden Bears	7	3	14	6	30

=== Syracuse ===
	1	2	3	4	Total
Orange	0	7	6	14	27
#19 Wildcats	10	24	0	14	48

=== Western Michigan ===
	1	2	3	4	Total
Broncos	3	7	7	0	17
#17 Wildcats	0	24	7	7	38

=== Maine ===
	1	2	3	4	Total
Black Bears	0	0	7	14	21
#18 Wildcats	7	7	7	14	35

=== Ohio State ===
	1	2	3	4	Total
#4 Buckeyes	10	3	7	20	40
#16 Wildcats	7	13	3	7	30

For the first time since November 11, 1995, ESPN's College GameDay was broadcast from Evanston prior to the game.

=== Wisconsin ===
	1	2	3	4	Total
#19 Wildcats	3	3	0	0	6
Badgers	7	14	7	7	35

=== Minnesota ===
	1	2	3	4	Total
Golden Gophers	0	7	7	6	20
Wildcats	7	0	0	10	17

=== Iowa ===
	1	2	3	4	OT	Total
Wildcats	0	0	7	3	0	10
Hawkeyes	7	3	0	0	7	17

=== Nebraska ===
	1	2	3	4	Total
Wildcats	14	7	0	3	24
Cornhuskers	7	7	7	6	27

=== Michigan ===
	1	2	3	4	OT	2OT	3OT	Total
Wolverines	3	0	0	6	7	3	8	27
Wildcats	3	3	3	0	7	3	0	19

=== Michigan State ===
	1	2	3	4	Total
#13 Spartans	0	14	9	7	30
Wildcats	3	3	0	0	6

=== Illinois ===
	1	2	3	4	Total
Wildcats	10	10	3	14	37
Fighting Illini	0	17	10	7	34

== Rankings ==
Ranking movements Legend: ██ Increase in ranking ██ Decrease in ranking — = Not ranked RV = Received votes
	Week																
Poll	Pre	1	2	3	4	5	6	7	8	9	10	11	12	13	14	15	Final
AP	22	19	17	18	17	16	19	RV	—	—	—	—	—	—	—	—	—
Coaches	22	20	16	16	16	15	18	RV	—	—	—	—	—	—	—	—	—
Harris	Not released							RV	—	—	—	—	—	—	—	—	Not released
BCS	Not released								—	—	—	—	—	—	—	—	Not released
