= 2013 Illinois Fighting Illini football team =

American college football season

2013 Illinois Fighting Illini football
- Conference: Big Ten Conference
- Leaders Division
- Record: 4–8 (1–7 Big Ten)
- Head coach: Tim Beckman (2nd season)
- Offensive coordinator: Bill Cubit (1st season)
- Offensive scheme: Spread
- Defensive coordinator: Tim Banks (2nd season)
- Base defense: 4–3
- Home stadium: Memorial Stadium

2013 Big Ten Conference football standings
	Conf.			Overall
Team	W		L	W		L
Legends Division
No. 3 Michigan State x$	8	–	0	13	–	1
Iowa	5	–	3	8	–	5
Nebraska	5	–	3	9	–	4
Minnesota	4	–	4	8	–	5
Michigan	3	–	5	7	–	6
Northwestern	1	–	7	5	–	7
Leaders Division
No. 12 Ohio State x%	8	–	0	12	–	2
No. 22 Wisconsin	6	–	2	9	–	4
Penn State*	4	–	4	7	–	5
Indiana	3	–	5	5	–	7
Illinois	1	–	7	4	–	8
Purdue	0	–	8	1	–	11
Championship: Michigan State 34, Ohio State 24
$ – BCS representative as conference champion; % – BCS at-large representative; x – Division champion/co-champions; Penn State ineligible for conference championship game and post-season bowl games due to NCAA sanctions; Rankings from AP Poll

The 2013 Illinois Fighting Illini football team was an American football team that represented the University of Illinois Urbana-Champaign as a member of the Big Ten Conference during the 2013 NCAA Division I FBS football season. In their second season under head coach Tim Beckman, the Fighting Illini compiled a 4–8 record (1–7 in conference games), finished in fifth place out of six teams in the Big Ten's Leaders Division, and were outscored by a total of 425 to 356.

Quarterback Nathan Scheelhaase led the Big Ten with 287 completions, 430 passes, a 66.7% completion percentage, 3,272 passing yards, and 13 interceptions. The team's other statistical leaders included running back Josh Ferguson (779 rushing yards), wide receiver Steve Hull (59 receptions for 993 yards), and kicker Taylor Zalewski (74 points scored, 38 of 38 extra points, 12 of 17 field goals).

The team played its home games at Memorial Stadium in Champaign, Illinois.

== Schedule ==
Date	Time	Opponent	Site	TV	Result	Attendance
August 31	11:00 am	Southern Illinois*	Memorial Stadium; Champaign, IL	BTN	W 42–34	42,175
September 7	11:00 am	Cincinnati*	Memorial Stadium; Champaign, IL	ESPN2	W 45–17	43,031
September 14	5:00 pm	vs. No. 19 Washington*	Soldier Field; Chicago, IL	BTN	L 24–34	47,312
September 28	11:00 am	Miami (OH)*	Memorial Stadium; Champaign, IL	BTN	W 50–14	46,890
October 5	11:00 am	at Nebraska	Memorial Stadium; Lincoln, NE	ESPNU	L 19–39	90,458
October 19	7:00 pm	No. 25 Wisconsin	Memorial Stadium; Champaign, IL	BTN	L 32–56	47,362
October 26	2:30 pm	Michigan State^{†}	Memorial Stadium; Champaign, IL	ABC/ESPN2	L 3–42	45,895
November 2	11:00 am	at Penn State	Beaver Stadium; University Park, PA	ESPN	L 17–24 ^{OT}	95,131
November 9	2:30 pm	at Indiana	Memorial Stadium; Bloomington, IN (rivalry)	BTN	L 35–52	44,882
November 16	11:00 am	No. 3 Ohio State	Memorial Stadium; Champaign, IL (Battle for the Illibuck)	ESPN	L 35–60	44,095
November 23	11:00 am	at Purdue	Ross–Ade Stadium; West Lafayette, IN (Battle for the Purdue Cannon)	BTN	W 20–16	37,459
November 30	2:30 pm	Northwestern	Memorial Stadium; Champaign, IL (Battle for the Land of Lincoln Trophy)	BTN	L 34–37	37,058
*Non-conference game; ^{†}Homecoming; Rankings from AP Poll released prior to the game; All times are in Central time

=== Chicago homecoming ===
Chicago homecoming logo

For only the second time in Soldier Field's 89-year history, the stadium hosted the Illinois Fighting Illini football team. The Fighting Illini's last appearance at Soldier Field was during the 1994 season in which the team lost 10–9 to #22 ranked Washington State Cougars. Additionally, the University of Illinois Alumni Association, Illinois Foundation, and Division and Intercollegiate Athletics are hosting an "Illini Fest" family tailgate prior the start of the football game. The event is modeled after Chicago Street Festivals that are popular throughout Neighborhoods in Chicago.

== Game summaries ==
=== Southern Illinois ===
	1	2	3	4	Total
Salukis	7	0	17	10	34
Fighting Illini	3	22	14	3	42

=== Cincinnati ===
	1	2	3	4	Total
Bearcats	0	7	10	0	17
Fighting Illini	7	14	7	17	45

=== Washington ===
	1	2	3	4	Total
#19 Huskies	0	10	21	3	34
Fighting Illini	0	3	14	7	24

=== Miami (OH) ===
	1	2	3	4	Total
RedHawks	0	0	7	7	14
Fighting Illini	7	29	7	7	50

=== Nebraska ===
	1	2	3	4	Total
Fighting Illini	0	5	7	7	19
Cornhuskers	14	9	13	3	39

=== Wisconsin ===
	1	2	3	4	Total
#25 Badgers	21	7	14	14	56
Fighting Illini	0	17	0	15	32

=== Michigan State ===
	1	2	3	4	Total
Spartans	0	14	14	14	42
Fighting Illini	3	0	0	0	3

=== Penn State ===
	1	2	3	4	OT	Total
Fighting Illini	0	3	7	7	0	17
Nittany Lions	7	7	0	3	7	24

=== Indiana ===
	1	2	3	4	Total
Fighting Illini	14	0	14	7	35
Hoosiers	14	7	14	17	52

=== Ohio State ===
	1	2	3	4	Total
#3 Buckeyes	21	14	9	16	60
Fighting Illini	0	14	7	14	35

=== Purdue ===
	1	2	3	4	Total
Fighting Illini	7	7	0	6	20
Boilermakers	14	0	0	2	16

=== Northwestern ===
	1	2	3	4	Total
Wildcats	10	10	3	14	37
Fighting Illini	0	17	10	7	34

== Personnel ==
=== Coaching staff ===
Name	Position	Seasons at Illinois	Alma mater
Tim Beckman	Head coach	1	Findlay (1985)
Tim Banks	Defensive coordinator/secondary	1	Central Michigan (1995)
Bill Cubit	Offensive coordinator/quarterbacks	0	Delaware (1974)
Mike Bellamy	Wide receivers	1	Illinois (1990)
A. J. Ricker	Offensive line	0	Missouri (2004)
Tim Salem	Special teams coordinator/Running backs	1	Arizona State (1985)
Greg Colby	Defensive line	0	Illinois (1974)
Alex Golesh	Tight Ends/recruiting coordinator	1	Ohio State (2006)
Al Seamonson	Outside linebackers	0	Wisconsin (1982)
Mike Ward	Inside Linebackers	1	Georgetown College (1984)

=== Roster ===
2013 Illinois Fighting Illini football team roster
Players
Coaches
Offense

Pos.	#	Name	Class
QB	2	Nathan Scheelhaase	Sr
TE	3	Jon Davis	Jr
QB	4	Reilly O'Toole	Jr
RB	5	Donovonn Young	Jr
RB	6	Josh Ferguson	So
WR	7	Martize Barr	Jr
WR	8	Miles Osei	Sr
DB	9	Steve Hull	Sr
QB	10	Chase Haslett	So
TE	11	Matt LaCosse	Jr
WR	12	Ryan Langford	Sr
QB	12	Wes Lunt	So
WR	13	Dionte Taylor	Fr
QB	15	Aaron Bailey	Fr
WR	16	Marchie Murdock	Fr
QB	16	Man Berg	Fr
RB	18	Jeremey Whitlow	So
WR	19	Justin Hardee	So
QB	19	Sean Hussey	Fr
RB	23	Cameron Tucker	So
RB	25	Foster	Fr
WR	26	Cedric Doxy	Fr
WR	29	Peter Bonahoom	So
QB	30	James Nudera	So
WR	31	Leslie Poole	So
RB	32	Devin Church	Fr
TE	47	Tim Clary	So
OL	52	Alex Hill	Jr
OL	55	Chris Boles	So
OL	57	Austin Schmidt	Fr
OL	60	Tony Durkin	So
OL	66	Scott McDowell	So
OL	67	Jake Feldmeyer	Sr
OL	68	Simon Cvijanovic	Jr
OL	69	Ted Karras	So
OL	70	Corey Lewis	Sr
OL	71	Joe Spencer	Fr
OL	72	Dallas Hinkhouse	Jr
OL	73	Chris O'Connor	So
OL	74	Michael Heitz	Jr
OL	75	Pat Flavin	So
OL	76	Jesse Chadwell	Fr
OL	78	Harry Black	Fr
WR	80	Spencer Harris	Sr
WR	81	Kevin Carroll	Fr
WR	82	Kameron Fry	So
TE	83	Trevor Kanteman	Fr
TE	84	Kenny Knight	So
WR	85	Elias Butler	Fr
TE	86	Tim Russell	Sr
TE	87	Tyler White	Fr
WR	88	Zach Grant	So
TE	89	Evan Wilson	Sr

Defense

Pos.	#	Name	Class
DB	2	V'Angelo Bentley	So
DB	3	Taylor Barton	Fr
DB	4	Darwyn Kelly	Fr
STAR	5	James Crawford	Fr
DB	9	Earnest Thomas III	Jr
STAR	10	B. J. Bello	Fr
STAR	14	Eric Finney	So
DB	15	Jevaris Little	Fr
DB	16	Caleb Day	Fr
DB	20	Dillan Cazley	Fr
STAR	20	Clayton Fejedelem	Jr
DB	21	Zane Petty	Jr
DB	22	Nick Forzley	Sr
DB	22	LaKeith Walls	Fr
DB	23	Ben Mathis	Sr
DB	24	Darius Mosely	Fr
DB	25	Sean Arowolaju	Fr
DB	27	Eaton Spencer	So
DB	28	Jaylen Dunlap	Fr
DB	29	Nelson Lugo	Fr
DB	30	Dennis Thurow	Fr
DB	31	Nick North	So
STAR	32	Daniel Quintana	Sr
LB	33	Zepheniah Grimes	So
STAR	34	Mike Svetina	So
LB	35	Taylor White	Fr
DB	36	Samuel Harlib	Fr
DB	37	Davontay Kwaaning	So
LB	38	Grant Rushing	Fr
LB	39	Nathan Echard	Fr
LB	40	Mikiel Thompson	So
DL	41	Brandon Roberts	Fr
LB	42	Ralph Cooper	Jr
LB	43	Mason Monheim	So
DL	44	Austin Teitsma	Jr
LB	45	Jonathan Brown	Sr
LB	48	Henry Dickinson	So
LB	52	T. J. Neal	Fr
LEO	55	Houston Bates	Jr
DL	58	Kenny Nelson	So
DL	59	Tim Kynard	Sr
DL	65	Christian DiLauro	Fr
LEO	90	DeJazz Woods	Jr
LEO	91	Dawuane Smoot	Fr
DL	92	Abe Cajuste	Jr
DL	93	Teko Powell	So
DL	94	Bryce Douglas	Fr
DL	95	Jake Howe	Jr
DL	96	Robbie Bain	Fr
DL	97	Vontrell Williams	Fr
DL	99	Jarrod Clements	Fr

Special teams

Pos.	#	Name	Class
PK/P	13	Ryan Frain	Fr
PK	17	Taylor Zalewski	So
P	18	Justin DuBernois	Jr
P	36	Brad Janitz	Sr
PK	38	David Reisner	Fr
LS	54	Zach Hirth	Fr
LS	56	Michael Martin	Fr
PK	83	Brennen VanMieghem	So

Head coach

- Tim Beckman

Coordinators/assistant coaches

- Tim Banks (defensive coordinator / secondary)
- Bill Cubit (offensive coordinator / quarterbacks)
- Mike Bellamy (wide receivers)
- Greg Colby (defensive line)
- Alex Golesh (tight ends / specialist / recruiting coordinator)
- A. J. Ricker (offensive line)
- Tim Salem (running backs / special teams coordinator)
- Al Seamonson (outside linebackers)
- Mike Ward (inside linebackers)
- Anthony Antonacci (graduate assistant - defense)
- Justin Hood (graduate assistant - defense)
- Kolby Jackson (graduate assistant - special teams)
- Tim Knox (director of football operations)
- Drew Nystrom (graduate assistant - offense)
- George Anasis (director of football game analysis)
- Nina Baloun (assistant recruiting coordinator)
- Marcus Berry (director of player personnel)
- Trent Chesnut (head football equipment manager)
- Corey Harbor (academic counselor)
- Aaron Hillmann (head football strength & conditioning coach)
- Matt Sinclair (assistant director of player personnel and relations)
- Carla Suber (learning specialist)
- Annie White (academic counselor)

Legend

- (C) Team captain
- (S) Suspended
- (I) Ineligible
- Injured
- Redshirt

Roster
Last update: December 3, 2014
