= Bruce Gaston (American football) =

American football player (born 1991)

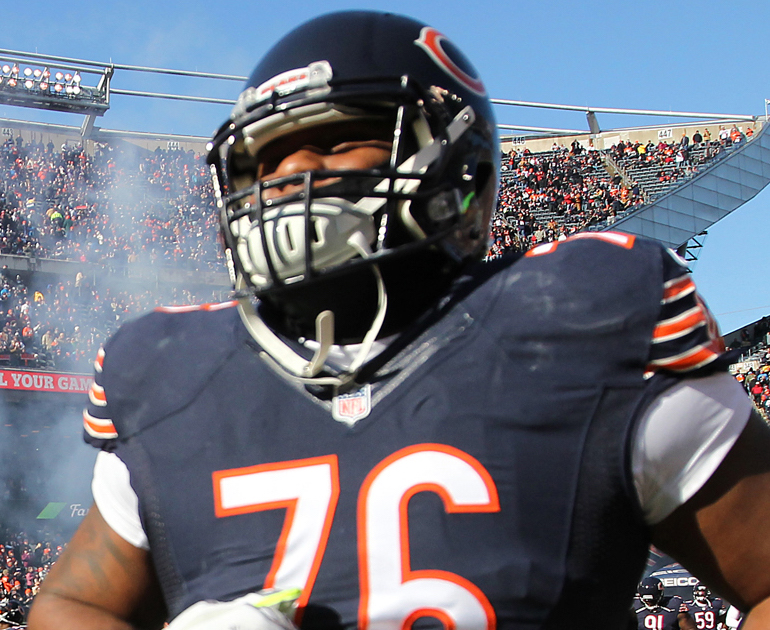
- Gaston with the Bears in 2015

No. 76, 99
- Position: Defensive tackle

Personal information
- Born: November 29, 1991 (age 34); Chicago, Illinois, U.S.
- Listed height: 6 ft 2 in (1.88 m)
- Listed weight: 308 lb (140 kg)

Career information
- High school: St. Rita (Chicago)
- College: Purdue
- NFL draft: 2014: undrafted

Career history
- Arizona Cardinals (2014)*; New England Patriots (2014)*; Miami Dolphins (2014); Arizona Cardinals (2014); Green Bay Packers (2014–2015); Chicago Bears (2015); Minnesota Vikings (2016)*; San Diego Chargers (2016)*; Philadelphia Eagles (2016)*; Carolina Panthers (2016)*; Detroit Lions (2017)*; Ottawa Redblacks (2018)*
- * Offseason or practice squad member only

Career NFL statistics
- Total tackles: 12
- Sacks: 1.0
- Stats at Pro Football Reference
- Stats at CFL.ca

Bruce Verdell Gaston Jr. (born November 29, 1991) is an American former professional football player who was a defensive tackle in the National Football League (NFL). He played college football for the Purdue Boilermakers. Gaston was signed by the Arizona Cardinals as an undrafted free agent in 2014. He has been a member of the New England Patriots, Miami Dolphins, Green Bay Packers, Chicago Bears, Minnesota Vikings, San Diego Chargers, Philadelphia Eagles, Carolina Panthers, Detroit Lions and Ottawa Redblacks.

== Professional career ==
=== Arizona Cardinals ===
After going undrafted in the 2014 NFL draft, he signed with the Arizona Cardinals. He was waived on August 30, 2014.

=== New England Patriots ===
He was signed to the Patriots’ practice squad on August 31, 2014, but was later waived on September 3, 2014.

=== Miami Dolphins ===
On September 4, 2014, Gaston was signed to the Dolphins’ active roster, but was later waived on September 20. He signed with their practice squad on September 23, 2014.

=== Arizona Cardinals ===
Gaston joined the Cardinals’ active roster by being signed off the Dolphins’ practice squad on September 24, 2014. He was later waived on November 1, 2014, but was signed to Arizona's practice squad on November 4, 2014.

=== Green Bay Packers ===
He was signed to the Packers’ active roster from the Cardinals’ practice squad on December 8, 2014. He was later waived on October 3, 2015, but was signed to their practice squad on October 6, 2015.

=== Chicago Bears ===
On October 17, 2015, Gaston was signed off the Packers' practice squad by the Chicago Bears to their active roster. He played in seven games for the Bears in 2015, recording 11 total tackles and one sack. He was released by the Bears on May 16, 2016.

=== Minnesota Vikings ===
Gaston signed with the Minnesota Vikings on May 31, 2016. He was released by the team on June 16, 2016.

=== San Diego Chargers ===
Gaston signed with the San Diego Chargers on July 31, 2016. On August 29, 2016, the Chargers waived him.

=== Philadelphia Eagles ===
Gaston signed with the Eagles on August 30, 2016. On September 3, 2016, he was released by the Eagles.

=== Carolina Panthers ===
On November 8, 2016, Gaston was signed to the Panthers' practice squad. He was released by the Panthers on November 22, 2016.

=== Detroit Lions ===
On June 8, 2017, Gaston signed with the Detroit Lions. He was waived/injured on August 21, 2017, and placed on injured reserve. He was released on August 26, 2017.

=== Ottawa Redblacks ===
On May 23, 2018, the Ottawa Redblacks of the Canadian Football League (CFL) announced the signing of Gaston. He was released on June 9, 2018.
