= Brock Vereen =

American football player (born 1992)

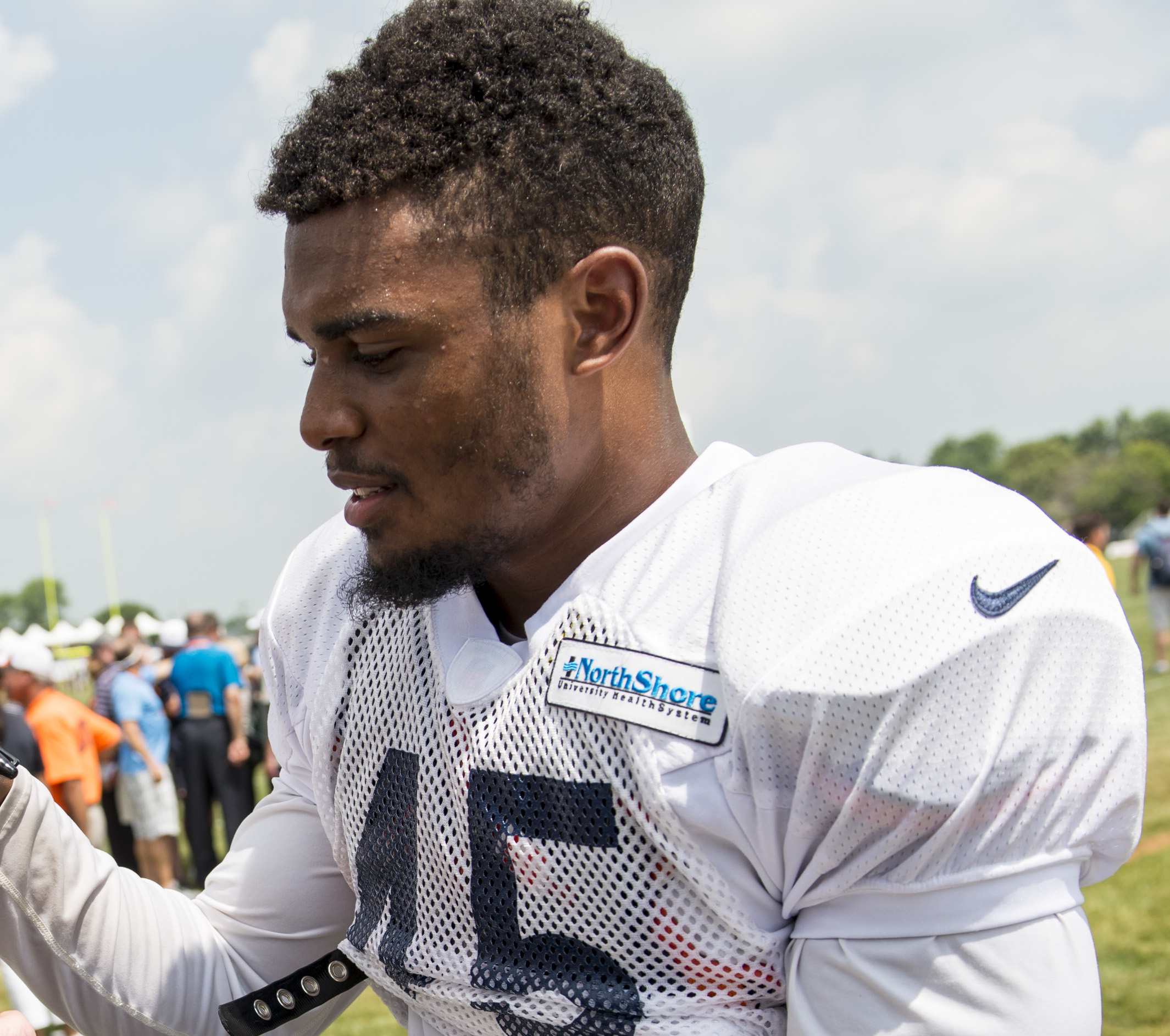
- Vereen at Chicago Bears training camp in 2015

No. 45
- Position: Safety

Personal information
- Born: August 17, 1992 (age 34); Santa Clarita, California, U.S.
- Listed height: 6 ft 0 in (1.83 m)
- Listed weight: 199 lb (90 kg)

Career information
- High school: Valencia (Santa Clarita)
- College: Minnesota
- NFL draft: 2014: 4th round, 131st overall pick

Career history
- Chicago Bears (2014–2015); Minnesota Vikings (2015)*; New England Patriots (2015–2016)*; Kansas City Chiefs (2016)*
- * Offseason or practice squad member only

Awards and highlights
- Second-team All-Big Ten (2013)

Career NFL statistics
- Total tackles: 39
- Forced fumbles: 1
- Interceptions: 1
- Stats at Pro Football Reference

Brock Vereen (born August 17, 1992) is an American former professional football player who was a safety in the National Football League (NFL). He was selected by the Chicago Bears in the fourth round of the 2014 NFL draft. He was also a member of the Minnesota Vikings, New England Patriots and Kansas City Chiefs. He played college football for the Minnesota Golden Gophers. He is currently doing broadcasting work on Big Ten Network on their onsite pre-game show and on CBS Sports Network's That Other Pregame Show as a studio commentator.

== Early life ==
Vereen attended Valencia High School in Santa Clarita, California, where he was a two-time All-California Interscholastic Federation (CIF) selection. He led his team to a 12–1 record in 2009. As a senior, he recorded 51 tackles, eight interceptions, two pass break-ups and one sack, while offensively, playing wide receiver, he caught 20 receptions for 474 yards and seven touchdowns.

Vereen was also a standout track & field athlete at Valencia, where he posted a personal best-time of 10.89 seconds in the 100-meter dash and participated in the 4x100.

Regarded as a three-star recruit by Rivals.com, Vereen was rated as the 66th best cornerback prospect of his class. Scout.com considered Vereen a two-star recruit and ranked him as the No. 166 cornerback in the nation, while ESPN.com had him as the No. 57 cornerback.

== College career ==
Vereen attended the University of Minnesota from 2010 to 2013. He played both safety and cornerback. As a true freshman in 2010, he appeared in nine games with four starts and recorded 10 total tackles. In 2011, he started all 12 games at cornerback, recording 67 tackles, one interception, one forced fumble and five pass break-ups. In 2012, he played in all 13 games, with seven starts at safety. He recorded 64 tackles, nine pass break-ups and two interceptions. In 2013, as a senior, he started all 13 games at safety, recording 59 tackles, one forced fumble, one interception and six pass break-ups. He was named first-team All-Big Ten Conference by the coaches.

== Professional career ==
Pre-draft measurables
Height	Weight	Arm length	Hand span	40-yard dash	10-yard split	20-yard split	20-yard shuttle	Three-cone drill	Vertical jump	Broad jump	Bench press
5 ft 11 5/8 in (1.82 m)	199 lb (90 kg)	30 in (0.76 m)	8 1/4 in (0.21 m)	4.47 s	1.58 s	2.63 s	4.07 s	6.90 s	34 in (0.86 m)	9 ft 9 in (2.97 m)	25 reps
All values from NFL Combine

=== Chicago Bears ===
Vereen was selected in the fourth round (131st overall) of the 2014 NFL draft by the Chicago Bears. He signed a four-year deal with the Bears on May 12, 2014. Vereen and fellow draft class quarterback David Fales were the NFL's first two draft picks to agree to terms.

He was released by the Bears on September 29, 2015.

=== Minnesota Vikings ===
Vereen was signed to the practice squad of the Minnesota Vikings on October 1, 2015, after being unclaimed on waivers. He was waived by the Vikings on November 13.

=== New England Patriots ===
The New England Patriots signed Vereen to their practice squad on November 18, 2015. On January 26, 2016, Vereen signed a futures contract with the Patriots. The Patriots released Vereen.

=== Kansas City Chiefs ===
On August 17, 2016, Vereen was claimed off waivers by the Kansas City Chiefs. On September 3, 2016, he was released by the Chiefs. The next day, he was signed to the Chiefs' practice squad. He was released from the practice squad two days later.

== Personal life ==
His father, Henry Vereen, was a ninth round pick of the Tampa Bay Buccaneers in the 1979 NFL draft, and played wide receiver in the Canadian Football League for the BC Lions in the early 1980s. Vereen is a first cousin once removed of stage actor and dancer Ben Vereen. His brother, Shane Vereen, was a second-round pick of the New England Patriots in the 2011 NFL draft.

Vereen is currently doing broadcasting work on Big Ten Network on their onsite pre-game show and on CBS Sports Network's That Other Pregame Show as a studio commentator.

In May of 2026, Audacy revealed that Vereen would be part of the KNX-FM lineup later that month when the station launched its new sports radio lineup as 97.1 The Fan.
