= 2014 Orange Bowl (January) =

2014 Discover Orange Bowl
- BCS Bowl Game; 80th Orange Bowl
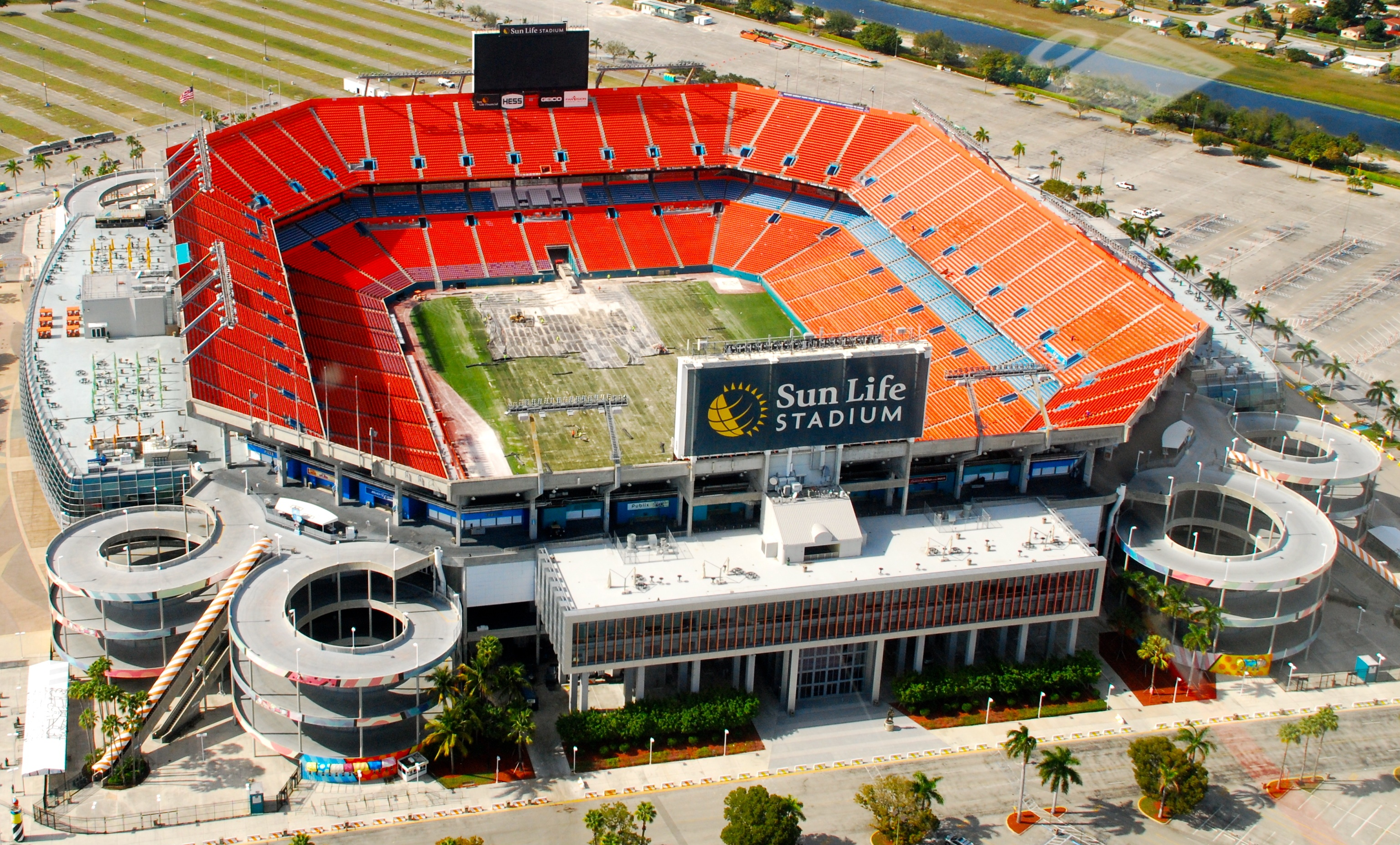
- Sun Life Stadium in Miami Gardens, Florida, hosted the Orange Bowl.
Clemson Tigers	Ohio State Buckeyes
(10–2)	(12–1)
ACC	Big Ten
40	35
Head coach: Dabo Swinney	Head coach: Urban Meyer
AP / Coaches / BCS; 12 / 11 / 12	AP / Coaches / BCS; 7 / 6 / 7
	1	2	3	4	Total
Clemson	14	6	14	6	40
Ohio State	9	13	7	6	35
- Date: January 3, 2014
- Season: 2013
- Stadium: Sun Life Stadium
- Location: Miami Gardens, Florida
- MVP: Sammy Watkins (WR – Clemson)
- Favorite: Ohio State by 2.5 (71.5)
- Referee: John McDaid (American)
- Halftime show: Dierks Bentley
- Attendance: 72,080
- Payout: US$17,000,000 per team

United States TV coverage
- Network: ESPN, ESPN Deportes
- Announcers: Joe Tessitore (Play-by-Play); Matt Millen (Analyst); Maria Taylor (Sidelines); Samantha Ponder (Sideline)
- Nielsen ratings: 6.7 (11.4 Million viewers)

The 2014 Orange Bowl was a college football bowl game played on Friday, January 3, 2014, at Sun Life Stadium in Miami Gardens, Florida. The 80th annual Orange Bowl, featured the Clemson Tigers from the Atlantic Coast Conference and the Ohio State Buckeyes from the Big Ten Conference. The game was broadcast live on ESPN at 8:30 p.m. EST. It was one of the 2013–14 bowl games that concluded the 2013 FBS football season. It was sponsored by Discover Financial Services and was officially known as the Discover Orange Bowl.

The game was organized by the Orange Bowl committee and was a part of the final year of the Bowl Championship Series.

Clemson was selected to participate in the Orange Bowl after a 10-2 season. Ohio State was picked as the other half of the matchup following a 12-1 campaign. The game marked the first time Ohio State had been in the Orange Bowl since the 1977 Orange Bowl. Clemson last played in the Orange Bowl game in 2012, losing to West Virginia 33-70.

The Tigers defeated the Buckeyes 40-35. Wide receiver Sammy Watkins, who set an Orange Bowl record with 227 receiving yards, was named the game's most valuable player.

== Teams ==
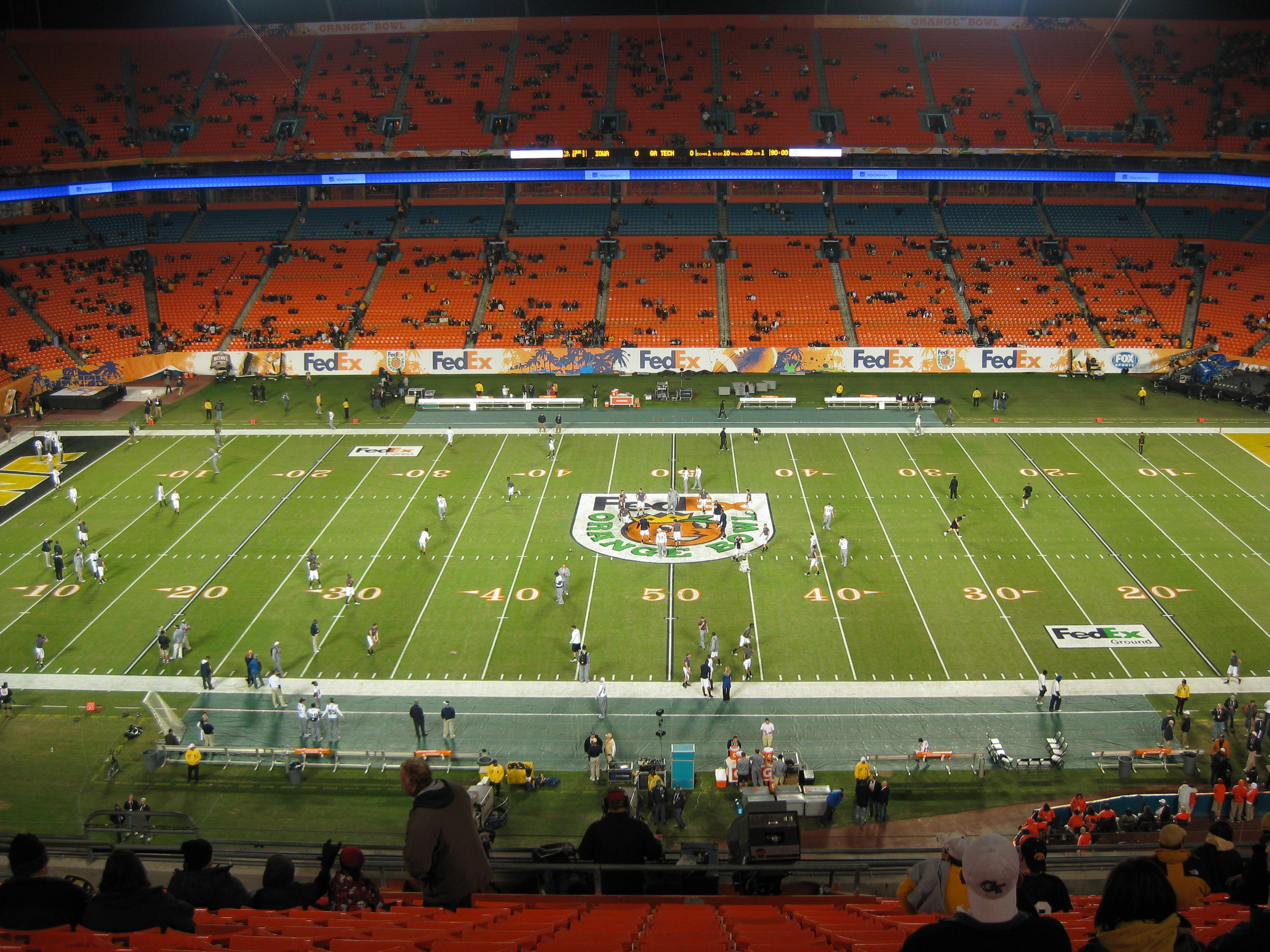
The 2014 Orange Bowl was played at Sun Life Stadium January 2010 photo.

The Orange Bowl matched the Clemson Tigers from the ACC and the Ohio State Buckeyes from the Big Ten. Both teams were BCS at-large selections, announced on December 8, 2013. Traditionally the Orange Bowl has been host to the ACC champion; however, since the Florida State Seminoles, the 2013 ACC champion, were selected for the 2014 BCS National Championship Game, the #2 ranked ACC team took place of Florida State's Orange Bowl berth.

The game was a rematch of the infamous 1978 Gator Bowl. During Ohio State's final drive, Clemson linebacker Charlie Bauman intercepted a pass thrown down the middle by OSU's Art Schlichter as time expired, giving Clemson the victory. Bauman ran towards the OSU sideline and was punched by OSU coach Woody Hayes. Clemson won 17–15, and Hayes was fired the next day, ending a long coaching career spent mostly with the Buckeyes. Ironically, Clemson won the 2014 Orange Bowl in a similar fashion as the 1978 Gator Bowl: in the final play of the game Clemson linebacker Stephone Anthony intercepted a pass thrown down the middle by OSU quarterback Braxton Miller as time expired, clinching the victory for Clemson.

=== Clemson ===
Clemson was led by head coach Dabo Swinney. Clemson entered the game with a 10-2 (7-1 conference) record. The Tigers began the season ranked #8 in the AP Poll. The Tigers won their first six games of the season, before losing to Florida State. The Tigers won their next four games before ending the regular season with a loss to in-state rivals South Carolina.

Clemson's offense was led by quarterback Tajh Boyd, who threw for 3,473 yards and 29 touchdowns entering the game. The Tigers' offense was also led by wide receiver Sammy Watkins, who entered the game with 1,237 receiving yards on the season.

The 2014 edition of the Orange Bowl marked the fifth time Clemson has played in the game. Clemson previously played in the 2012 edition of the game.

=== Ohio State ===
The Ohio State Buckeyes were led by head coach Urban Meyer. The team finished a perfect 12–0 in 2012, but were not eligible for a bowl game due to NCAA sanctions. The Buckeyes were again undefeated heading into the Big Ten Championship Game with a possible National Championship game appearance on the line. However, the Buckeyes were defeated by Michigan State, who earned the conference's spot in the 2014 Rose Bowl. Ohio State was selected as an at-large.

Ohio State's offense was led by quarterback Braxton Miller, who threw for 1,860 and rushed for another 1,033 yards. The Buckeyes were known for running the ball, ranking 3rd in the FBS in rushing yards per game. The Buckeyes' rushing attack was led by Carlos Hyde, who averaged 141 rushing yards per game coming into the Orange Bowl.

This marked the second time Ohio State has played in the Orange Bowl game. The Buckeyes previously played in the 1977 edition of the game, where they defeated Colorado 27-10.

== Game summary ==
=== First quarter ===
Clemson scored first on a 48-yard touchdown run by Tajh Boyd to make it 7-0. Ohio State responded on its next drive with a 33-yard touchdown run by Braxton Miller, tying the game at 7-7. Clemson responded on their next drive, going up 14-7 on a 34-yard touchdown pass from Boyd to Sammy Watkins. Ohio State's next drive ended in a punt, but the Buckeyes were able to pin the Tigers inside Clemson's 1-yard line. On the first play of Clemson's drive, Boyd was called for an intentional grounding penalty in the end zone, which gave Ohio State a safety, making the score 14-9.

=== Second quarter ===
Clemson punted on the first play of the second quarter. Ohio State went three-and-out and were forced to punt the ball away. On the ensuing Tigers drive, Clemson was able to drive deep to Ohio State's 6-yard line. The Tigers came up empty on the drive, however, as Tajh Boyd was intercepted at OSU's 1-yard line. Ohio State went three-and-out again, however, and the Buckeyes were forced to punt the ball away. On the following Clemson drive, the Tigers scored on a 3-yard touchdown pass from Boyd to Martavis Bryant. Chandler Catanzaro missed the extra point attempt, however, making it a 20-9 game with 6:16 remaining in the half. On OSU's next drive, the Buckeyes were able to cut into the Tigers' on a 57-yard touchdown pass from Miller to Jeff Heuerman. OSU's extra point was blocked, however, making it a 20-15 game. Clemson was able to drive into Ohio State territory on its next drive. Facing a 4th and 5 situation at OSU's 40-yard line, the Tigers decided to go for it instead of punting the ball away. Boyd connected with Roderick McDowell, but McDowell was unable to get a first down, thus giving OSU the ball at the Buckeyes' 21-yard line after an unsportsmanlike conduct was called on OSU. Ohio State took a 22-20 lead on a 3-yard touchdown run from Braxton Miller. The score remained 22-20 going into the half.

=== Third quarter ===
Clemson and OSU exchanged punts to start the third quarter. On Ohio State's second drive of the quarter, the Buckeyes took a 29-20 lead on a 1-yard touchdown run from Carlos Hyde. On Clemson's next drive, they were forced into a punt by the Ohio State defense, however the punt was muffed by Ohio State returner Corey "Philly" Brown and retrieved by the Clemson special teams unit. Clemson responded to the fumble recovery with a 30-yard touchdown pass from Boyd to Watkins to make it 29-27 game. On the ensuing OSU drive, Braxton Miller was intercepted at OSU's 38-yard line. Clemson capitalized on the turnover, taking a 34-29 lead in the game on a 3-yard touchdown pass to Martavis Bryant.

=== Fourth quarter ===
Ohio State took a 35-34 lead early in the fourth quarter on a 14-yard touchdown pass from Miller to Hyde. OSU's two-point conversion failed, and the game remained 35-34. Clemson retook the lead on its next drive on a 5-yard touchdown pass from Boyd to Stanton Seckinger. The two-point conversion failed, however, and the game remained 40-35 with 6:16 remaining in the game. On the next OSU drive, the Buckeyes were able to drive into Clemson territory. However, on the sixth play of the drive, Braxton Miller fumbled after being sacked by Bashaud Breeland. Clemson recovered the fumble at OSU 47-yard line with 3:12 remaining in the game. The Tigers were unable to close out the game, however, as Tajh Boyd was intercepted by C.J. Barnett with 1:27 remaining in the game. Ohio State's possession was short lived, as Braxton Miller was intercepted on the second play of the drive with 1:18 remaining in the game. After getting a first down, Clemson was able to run out the clock.

== Scoring summary ==
Scoring summary

Quarter	Time	Drive			Team	Scoring information	Score	
Quarter	Time	Plays	Yards	TOP	Team	Scoring information	Clemson	Ohio State
1	12:50	6	75	2:10	Clemson	Tajh Boyd 48-yard touchdown run, Chandler Catanzaro kick good	7	0
1	5:44	13	75	7:06	Ohio State	Braxton Miller 33-yard touchdown run, Drew Basil kick good	7	7
1	4:56	4	75	0:48	Clemson	Sammy Watkins 34-yard touchdown reception from Tajh Boyd, Chandler Catanzaro kick good	14	7
1	2:25	1	-1	0:06	Ohio State	Penalty On Tajh Boyd In End Zone, safety	14	9
2	6:16	7	77	2:35	Clemson	Martavis Bryant 3-yard touchdown reception from Tajh Boyd, kick no good	20	9
2	3:39	5	85	2:37	Ohio State	Jeff Heuerman 57-yard touchdown reception from Braxton Miller, Drew Basil kick no good (blocked)	20	15
2	0:12	5	64	0:57	Ohio State	Braxton Miller 3-yard touchdown run, Drew Basil kick good	20	22
3	5:50	9	87	4:47	Ohio State	Carlos Hyde 1-yard touchdown run, Drew Basil kick good	20	29
3	2:47	3	33	0:49	Clemson	Sammy Watkins 30-yard touchdown reception from Tajh Boyd, Chandler Catanzaro kick good	27	29
3	0:32	4	38	1:25	Clemson	Martavis Bryant 3-yard touchdown reception from Tajh Boyd, Chandler Catanzaro kick good	34	29
4	11:35	10	75	3:57	Ohio State	Carlos Hyde 14-yard touchdown reception from Braxton Miller, 2-point pass fail	34	35
4	6:16	13	75	5:19	Clemson	Stanton Seckinger 5-yard touchdown reception from Tajh Boyd, 2-point pass fail	40	35
"TOP" = time of possession. For other American football terms, see Glossary of American football.							40	35

== Statistics ==
Statistics	Clemson	Ohio St.
First downs	24	27
Total offense, plays – yards	76–576	72–427
Rushes-yards (net)	36–198	48–193
Passing yards (net)	378	234
Passes, Comp-Att-Int	31–40–2	16–24–2
Time of Possession	27:09	32:51

Clemson wide receiver Sammy Watkins was named the game's most valuable player. Watkins had 16 catches for 227 yards and 2 touchdowns. Watkins also set the Orange Bowl record for yardage with his performance.

Clemson outgained Ohio State in total yardage 576-427. Ohio State committed 4 turnovers, while Clemson committed 2. The Tigers were also more efficient in third down conversions; Clemson converted 7 out of 13 attempts, while OSU converted only 2 out of 13 attempts.

Clemson quarterback Tajh Boyd completed 31 of his 40 passes for 5 touchdowns and 2 interceptions. Boyd threw for 378 yards. Boyd was also the Tigers' leading rusher, rushing for 127 yards and 1 touchdown. Clemson's second leading rusher was Roderick McDowell, who rushed for 69 yards on 12 attempts. Jordan Leggett was Clemson's second leading receiving, catching 1 pass for 43 yards.

Ohio State quarterback Braxton Miller completed 16 of his 24 passes for 2 touchdowns and 2 interceptions. Miller had 234 passing yards in the game. Carlos Hyde was the Buckeyes' leading rusher, rushing for 113 yards and 1 touchdown. OSU's leading receiver was Philly Brown, who caught 8 passes for 116 yards.
