= 2013 Ohio State Buckeyes football team =

American college football season

2013 Ohio State Buckeyes football

Big Ten Leaders Division champion

Big Ten Championship Game, L 24–34 vs. Michigan State

Orange Bowl, L 35–40 vs. Clemson
- Conference: Big Ten Conference
- Leaders Division

Ranking
- Coaches: No. 10
- AP: No. 12
- Record: 12–2 (8–0 Big Ten)
- Head coach: Urban Meyer (2nd season)
- Offensive coordinator: Tom Herman (2nd season)
- Co-offensive coordinator: Ed Warinner (2nd season)
- Offensive scheme: Spread
- Co-defensive coordinators: Luke Fickell (8th season); Everett Withers (2nd season)
- Base defense: Multiple
- Captain: 8: Jack Mewhort; C.J. Barnett; Christian Bryant; Kenny Guiton; Braxton Miller; Ryan Shazier; Corey Linsley; Corey Brown
- Home stadium: Ohio Stadium

2013 Big Ten Conference football standings
	Conf.			Overall
Team	W		L	W		L
Legends Division
No. 3 Michigan State x$	8	–	0	13	–	1
Iowa	5	–	3	8	–	5
Nebraska	5	–	3	9	–	4
Minnesota	4	–	4	8	–	5
Michigan	3	–	5	7	–	6
Northwestern	1	–	7	5	–	7
Leaders Division
No. 12 Ohio State x%	8	–	0	12	–	2
No. 22 Wisconsin	6	–	2	9	–	4
Penn State*	4	–	4	7	–	5
Indiana	3	–	5	5	–	7
Illinois	1	–	7	4	–	8
Purdue	0	–	8	1	–	11
Championship: Michigan State 34, Ohio State 24
$ – BCS representative as conference champion; % – BCS at-large representative; x – Division champion/co-champions; Penn State ineligible for conference championship game and post-season bowl games due to NCAA sanctions; Rankings from AP Poll

The 2013 Ohio State Buckeyes football team represented Ohio State University in the 2013 NCAA Division I FBS football season. It was the Buckeye's 124th overall, the 101st as a member of the Big Ten Conference, and the third as a member of the Big Ten Leaders Division. The team was led by Urban Meyer, in his second year as head coach, and played its home games at Ohio Stadium in Columbus, Ohio. The Buckeyes finished the regular season with an undefeated record for the second consecutive year, as well as Big Ten Leaders Division champions for the second consecutive year. They finished the season with a record of 12 wins and 2 losses (12–2 overall, 8–0 in the Big Ten), following losses to Michigan State in the Big Ten Championship Game and to Clemson in the Orange Bowl.

After an undefeated season in 2012, Ohio State signed a highly ranked recruiting class and entered the 2013 season ranked No. 2 in all major college football polls, as well as being considered the favorite to win the Leaders Division, while also competing for the Big Ten championship and national championship. Ohio State opened the season defeating all of their non-conference opponents by a combined score of 210–61. The Buckeyes opened their conference schedule with victories over the Wisconsin Badgers and Northwestern Wildcats, both ranked at the time, and improved their record to 6–0. A 63–14 victory over Penn State and a 60–35 victory over Illinois kept the Buckeyes highly ranked throughout the season. A 42–41 victory over Michigan in The Game gave Ohio State a 12–0 regular season record for the second consecutive season. Following losses in the Big Ten Championship Game and the Orange Bowl, the Buckeyes finished the season ranked No. 10 in the Coaches' Poll and No. 12 in the AP Poll.

At the end of the season, several players were recognized with postseason awards for individual accomplishments. Braxton Miller was named the Big Ten offensive player of the year, as well as the Big Ten quarterback of the year for the second consecutive season, while Carlos Hyde was named the Big Ten running back of the year. Also, Ryan Shazier was named to the Associated Press All-American First Team, while Carlos Hyde and Jack Mewhort were named to the Associated Press All-American Second Team. The Buckeyes also had six players taken in the NFL draft, including Shazier and Bradley Roby, who were both taken in the first round.

== Before the season ==
=== Spring practice ===
Spring Game

Team	1	2	3	4	Total
Gray	0	7	0	7	14
• Scarlet	7	7	10	7	31

- Date: April 13
- Location: Cincinnati, Ohio
- Game start: 1:30 p.m.
- Elapsed time: 2:03
- Game attendance: 37,643
- Game weather: Mostly Sunny, 53 °F (12 °C), Wind S 17 mph (27 km/h)
- TV announcers (BTN): Eric Collins (play-by-play), Glen Mason (color)

Scoring summary
1	9:08	Scarlet	Devin Smith 20-yard pass from Braxton Miller (Drew Basil kick)	Scarlet 7–0
2	4:35	Gray	Chris Field 5-yard pass from Kenny Guiton (Drew Basil kick)	7–7
2	0:07	Scarlet	Corey Brown 3-yard pass from Braxton Miller (Drew Basil kick)	Scarlet 14–7
3	6:25	Scarlet	Braxton Miller 5-yard run (Drew Basil kick)	Scarlet 21–7
3	4:13	Scarlet	Drew Basil 25-yard field goal	Scarlet 24–7
4	8:44	Gray	Michael Thomas 4-yard pass from Cardale Jones (Drew Basil kick)	Scarlet 24–14
4	4:41	Scarlet	Chris Field 6-yard run (Drew Basil kick)	Scarlet 31–14

Ohio State began their spring camp earlier than they had in previous seasons, starting it on March 5. The 2013 spring game was played on April 13 and was broadcast on the Big Ten Network. Ohio State played their spring game at Paul Brown Stadium in Cincinnati, Ohio, while Ohio Stadium underwent renovations. In similar formats to previous seasons, the Buckeyes were divided up into Scarlet and Gray teams. Quarterback Braxton Miller, who played on the Scarlet team, opened up the game with a 20-yard touchdown pass to Devin Smith and with no other scoring in the first quarter, the Scarlet team took their 7–0 lead to the second quarter. Kenny Guiton, who was the starting quarterback for the Gray team, tied the game up with a touchdown pass of his own to receiver Chris Fields. A Corey Brown touchdown reception with a few seconds remaining in the first half, would give the Scarlet team the 14–7 advantage heading into halftime. The third quarter would be dominated by the Scarlet team as Braxton Miller would drive the team to the endzone, capping off the drive with a 5-yard touchdown run. A Drew Basil field goal with about four minutes remaining in the quarter would give the Scarlet a 24–7 advantage. The Gray team would not score until the fourth quarter, off of a 4-yard touchdown pass from Cardale Jones to Michael Thomas. The game, scoring wise, was capped off with a Chris Field 6-yard touchdown run, with the final score being 31–14 in favor of the Scarlet team.

Quarterback Braxton Miller finished the game going 16 of 25 for a total of 217 yards and two touchdown passes, along with his touchdown run. Corey Brown led the receivers with five receptions for 25 yards and touchdown, while sophomore receiver Michael Thomas accounted for 79 yards, a touchdown and seven receptions. On defense, lineman Adolphus Washington accounted for four sacks, leading both teams. The game also featured many new players replacing starters last season, though playmakers Noah Spence and Washington on the defensive line still impressed the coaching staff. The line accounted for a total of 11 sacks during the game, with a four quarterbacks involved being sacked at some point. Though the defense, impressed, with the majority of the success coming from the passing game with both teams only accounting for 122 rushing yards collectively on 45 carries.

=== Fall camp ===
Twelve separate Ohio State players were on preseason award watch lists in sixteen different award categories. These include C.J. Barnett, Bradley Roby and Ryan Shazier for the Bednarik Award; Corey Brown and Devin Smith for the Biletnikoff Award; Christian Bryant, Roby and Shazier for the Bronko Nagurski Trophy; Shazier for the Butkus Award; Braxton Miller for the Davey O'Brien Award; Carlos Hyde for the Doak Walker Award; Barnett, Bryan and Roby for the Jim Thorpe Award; Jeff Heuerman for the Mackey Award; Hyde and Miller for the Maxwell Award; Jack Mewhort and Andrew Norwell for the Outland Trophy; Corey Linsly for the Rimington Trophy; Norwell and Shazier for the Lombardi Award; as well as Miller and Roby for the Walter Camp Award. Before the start of camp, Ohio State faced off the field issues with some players, including running back Carlos Hyde, who was suspended from the team following his arrest and involvement in an assault case against a female in Columbus, Ohio. Hyde was originally dismissed from the program when the news of the investigation first broke, however, when he was dropped as a person of interest, head coach Urban Meyer dropped his suspension to three games. Cornerback Bradley Roby was arrested on July 21 after an altercation at a bar in Bloomington, Indiana. The charges against Roby were reduced to misdemeanor on August 16. Ohio State opened their fall camp with all freshmen reporting on August 4, with other players reporting later in the week.

== Personnel ==
=== Coaching staff ===
Ohio State head coach Urban Meyer was in his second year as the Buckeye's head coach during the 2013 season. In his first season with Ohio State, he led the Buckeyes to an undefeated season with twelve wins (12–0), though the team was unable to participate in the Big Ten Championship Game or a bowl game due to sanctions. On February 8, 2013, it was announced the cornerbacks coach Kerry Coombs was promoted to special teams coach for the upcoming season, while also retaining his role as cornerbacks coach.

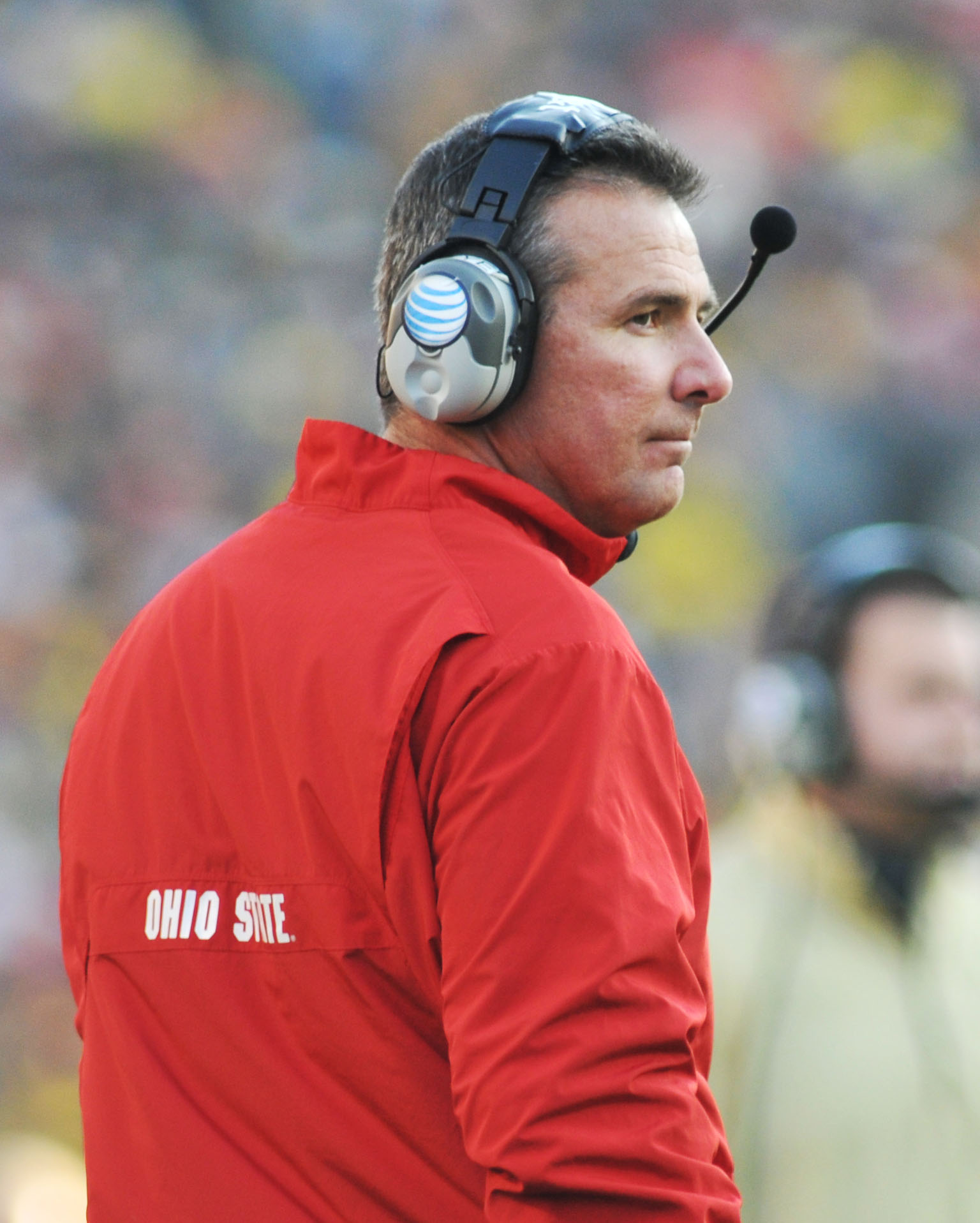
Urban Meyer was in his second year as Ohio State's head coach during the 2013 season.

Name	Position	Seasons at Ohio State	Alma mater
Urban Meyer	Head coach	2nd	Cincinnati (1986)
Tom Herman	Offensive coordinator, Quarterbacks	2nd	California Lutheran (1997)
Ed Warinner	Co-offensive coordinator, Offensive line	2nd	Mount Union (1984)
Luke Fickell	Co-defensive coordinator, Linebackers	12th	Ohio State (1997)
Everett Withers	Assistant head coach, Co-Defensive coordinator/safeties	2nd	Appalachian State (1985)
Kerry Coombs	Special teams coordinator, Cornerbacks	2nd	Dayton (1983)
Stan Drayton	Running backs	3rd	Allegheny College (1993)
Zach Smith	Wide receivers	2nd	Florida (2007)
Mike Vrabel	Defensive line	3rd	Ohio State (1996)
Tim Hinton	Tight ends, fullbacks	2nd	Wilmington (1982)
Parker Fleming	Graduate assistant	1st	Presbyterian (2010)
Bryant Haines	Graduate assistant	1st	Ball State (2009)
Mickey Marotti	Assistant athletic director for football sports performance	2nd	West Liberty (1987)
Tyler Hughes	Quality control assistant, quarterbacks	1st	Utah State (2005)

=== Returning starters ===
Ohio State returns 14 starters from the 2012 season, including nine on offense, four defense, as well as one on special teams. Quarterback Braxton Miller returns after starting all twelve games in 2012 and eight games in 2011. Along with Miller on offense, running back Carlos Hyde, offensive tackle Jack Mewhort and offensive guard Andrew Norwell all return on offense after being named to the Big Ten All-Conference team last season. On defense linebacker Ryan Shazier returns after being named to the All-Conference team in 2012, while cornerback Bradley Roby returns after being named to the AP All-American team last season. On offense, Ohio State lost tight end Jake Stoneburner and offensive tackle Reid Fragel, along with punter Ben Buchanan, all seniors. On defense, Ohio State lost defensive lineman John Simon, Garrett Goebel and Nathan Williams, linebackers Etienne Sabino and Zach Boren, along with cornerback Travis Howard, all to graduation. The only Buckeye junior eligible for the NFL draft that declared eligibility was defensive lineman Johnathan Hankins, who was selected in the second round by the New York Giants.

==== Offense ====
Player	Class	Position
Braxton Miller	Junior	Quarterback
Carlos Hyde	Senior	Tailback
Corey Brown	Senior	Wide receiver
Devin Smith	Junior	Wide receiver
Jeff Heuerman	Junior	Tight end
Jack Mewhort	Senior	Tackle
Andrew Norwell	Senior	Guard
Corey Linsley	Senior	Center
Marcus Hall	Senior	Guard

==== Defense ====
Player	Class	Position
Bradley Roby	Junior	Cornerback
Christian Bryant	Senior	Safety
C.J. Barnett	Senior	Safety
Ryan Shazier	Junior	Linebacker

==== Special teams ====
Player	Class	Position
Drew Basil	Senior	Kicker

=== Roster ===
2013 Ohio State Buckeyes roster
Quarterbacks: 5 Braxton Miller – Junior; 11 Reid Worstell – Freshman; 12 Cardale Jones – Freshman; 13 Kenny Guiton – Senior; 15 Luke Morgan – Freshman; 16 J. T. Barrett – Freshman; Running backs: 1 Dontre Wilson – Freshman; 7 Rod Smith – Junior; 2 Jordan Hall – Senior; 15 Ezekiel Elliott – Freshman; 25 Bri'onte Dunn – Sophomore; 28 Warren Ball – Freshman; 34 Carlos Hyde – Senior; 46 Devin Hill – Sophomore; Wide receivers: 6 Evan Spencer – Junior; 8 Jeff Greene – Junior; 9 Devin Smith – Junior; 10 Corey Brown – Senior; 17 Jalin Marshall – Freshman; 18 Kato Mitchell – Sophomore; 19 Joe Ramstetter – Freshman; 21 Devlin McDaniel – Freshman; 33 Frank Epitropoulos – Freshman; 80 Chris Fields – Senior; 82 James Clark – Freshman; 83 Michael Thomas– Sophomore; 84 Corey Smith – Junior; 86 Khaleed Franklin – Freshman; 87 Peter Gwilym – Sophomore; 88 Brandon Ojikutu – Sophomore; Tight ends: 8 J.T. Moore – Junior; 81 Nick Vannett – Sophomore; 82 Ryan Carter – Sophomore; 84 Charles Kinzig – Junior; 85 Marcus Baugh – Freshman; 86 Jeff Heuerman – Junior; 89 Blake Thomas – Freshman	Offensive linemen: 50 Jacoby Boren – Sophomore; 54 Billy Price – Freshman; 55 Tommy Brown – Sophomore; 57 Chase Farris – Sophomore; 61 Logan Gaskey – Freshman; 62 Ben Moffitt – Freshman; 64 Ivon Blackman – Senior; 65 Pat Elflein – Freshman; 66 Kyle Dodson – Freshman; 67 Ben St. John – Junior; 68 Taylor Decker – Sophomore; 69 Eric Kramer – Junior; 71 Corey Linsley – Senior; 73 Antonio Underwood – Junior; 74 Jack Mewhort – Senior; 75 Evan Lisle – Freshman; 76 Darryl Baldwin – Junior; 78 Andrew Norwell – Senior; 79 Marcus Hall – Senior; Defensive linemen: 8 Noah Spence – Sophomore; 34 Jamal Marcus – Sophomore; 51 Joel Hale – Junior; 52 Donovan Munger – Freshman; 59 Tyquan Lewis – Freshman; 63 Michael Bennett – Junior; 72 Chris Carter – Sophomore; 77 Michael Hill – Freshman; 88 Steve Miller – Junior; 90 Tommy Schutt – Sophomore; 91 Chris Rock – Sophomore; 92 Adolphus Washington – Sophomore; 93 Tracy Sprinkle – Freshman; 94 Rashad Frazier – Sophomore; 97 Joey Bosa – Freshman; 98 John Holman – Junior	Linebackers: 10 Ryan Shazier – Junior; 14 Curtis Grant – Junior; 36 Trey Johnson – Freshman; 37 Joshua Perry – Sophomore; 38 Craig Fada – Sophomore; 41 Aaron Mawhirter – Freshman; 43 Darron Lee – Freshman; 44 Mike Mitchell – Freshman; 46 Nick Snyder – Sophomore; 48 Joe Burger – Sophomore; 49 Craig Cataline – Junior; 55 Camren Williams – Sophomore; Defensive backs: 1 Bradley Roby – Junior; 2 Christian Bryant – Senior; 3 Corey Brown – Senior; 4 C.J. Barnett – Senior; 6 Vonn Bell – Freshman; 11 Adam Griffin – Junior; 12 Doran Grant – Junior; 13 Eli Apple – Freshman; 16 Cam Burrows – Freshman; 17 Devonte Butler – Freshman; 19 Gareon Conley – Freshman; 20 Ron Tanner – Sophomore; 21 Jamie Wood – Senior; 23 Tyvis Powell – Freshman; 25 Kevin Niehoff – Sophomore; 26 Armani Reeves – Sophomore; 29 Jayme Thompson – Freshman; 30 Devan Bogard – Sophomore; 32 Russel Doup – Junior; 33 Nik Sarac – Sophomore; 35 Chris Worley – Freshman; 42 Tyler McIntosh – Junior	Punters: 14 Jake Russell – Sophomore; 95 Cameron Johnston – Freshman; Kickers: 23 Tim Scott – Junior; 24 Drew Basil – Senior; 39 Kyle Clinton – Junior; Long snappers: 41 Bryce Haynes – Sophomore; 56 George Makridis – Senior
Sources: 2013 Ohio State Buckeyes football roster

=== Depth chart ===
Starters and backups.

Defense

FS
Corey Brown
Tyvis Powell

WLB	MLB	SLB
Ryan Shazier	Curtis Grant	Joshua Perry
Trey Johnson	Joe Burger	Camren Williams

SS
C.J. Barnett
Ron Tanner

CB
Doran Grant
Gareon Conley

DE	DT	DT	DE
Joey Bosa	Joel Hale	Michael Bennett	Noah Spence
Adolphus Washington	Jamal Marcus	Tommy Schutt	Chris Carter

CB
Bradley Roby
Armani Reeves

Offense

WR
Evan Spencer
Chris Fields

WR
Corey Brown
Dontre Wilson

LT	LG	C	RG	RT
Jack Mewhort	Andrew Norwell	Corey Linsley	Marcus Hall	Taylor Decker
Darryl Baldwin	Pat Elflein	Jacoby Boren	Pat Elflein	Kyle Dodson

WR
Jeff Heuerman (TE)
Nick Vannett (TE)

WR
Devin Smith
Rod Smith

QB
Braxton Miller
Kenny Guiton

RB
Carlos Hyde
Jordan Hall

Special teams
PK Drew Basil
PK Kyle Clinton
P Cameron Johnston
P Drew Basil
KR Jordan Hall
Dontre Wilson
PR Corey Brown
Jordan Hall
LS George Makridis
Bryce Haynes
H Kenny Guiton

=== Recruiting class ===
Prior to National Signing Day on February 6, 2013, six high school players that graduated early and one transfer of the 2013 recruiting class enrolled for the spring semester in order to participate in spring practice. These early enrollments included: cornerbacks Eli Apple and Cameron Burrows, quarterback J.T. Barrett, fullback William Houston, defensive ends Tyquan Lewis Tracy Sprinkle, and fullback Devin Hill, who transferred from Purdue University. On February 6, 2013, the Ohio State University athletic department confirmed that it had received the National Letter of Intent from seventeen additional players to play at Ohio State that completed the 2013 recruiting class.

Ohio State's recruiting class was highlighted by seventeen players from the "ESPN 300", including eight in the top 100: No. 11 Eli Apple (cornerback); No. 43 Gareon Conley (cornerback); No. 48 Trey Johnson (linebacker); No. 49 Jalin Marshall (wide receiver); No. 50 Vonn Bell (safety); No. 55 Dontre Wilson (athlete); No. 56 Joey Bosa (defensive tackle); and No. 62 Cam Burrows (cornerback). On signing day, Buckeyes head coach Urban Meyer was quoted as calling it a great day. With Meyer going onto say, "I thought it would be a good day, but now I'll put it in the great category." The Buckeyes' signed the No. 2 recruiting class according to Rivals.com, the No. 1 recruiting class according to Scout.com, and the No. 3 recruiting class according to ESPN.

College recruiting (2013)
Name	Hometown	School	Height	Weight	40^{‡}	Commit date
Eli Apple; DB	Voorhees, NJ	Eastern	6 ft 0 in (1.83 m)	185 lb (84 kg)	4.4	Nov 23, 2012
Eli Apple; DB	Recruit ratings: Scout: Rivals: ESPN:					
J.T. Barrett; QB	Wichita Falls, TX	Rider	6 ft 2 in (1.88 m)	205 lb (93 kg)	–	Apr 18, 2012
J.T. Barrett; QB	Recruit ratings: Scout: Rivals: ESPN:					
Marcus Baugh; TE	Riverside, CA	John W. North	6 ft 4 in (1.93 m)	233 lb (106 kg)	–	Apr 10, 2012
Marcus Baugh; TE	Recruit ratings: Scout: Rivals: ESPN:					
Vonn Bell; S	Rossville, GA	Ridgeland	6 ft 1 in (1.85 m)	190 lb (86 kg)	4.47	Feb 6, 2013
Vonn Bell; S	Recruit ratings: Scout: Rivals: ESPN:					
Joey Bosa; DE	Fort Lauderdale, FL	Thomas Aquinas	6 ft 5 in (1.96 m)	270 lb (120 kg)	–	Apr 23, 2012
Joey Bosa; DE	Recruit ratings: Scout: Rivals: ESPN:					
Cameron Burrows; DB	Trotwood, OH	Trotwood-Madison	6 ft 0 in (1.83 m)	203 lb (92 kg)	4.57	Jan 19, 2012
Cameron Burrows; DB	Recruit ratings: Scout: Rivals: ESPN:					
James Clark; WR	New Smyrna Beach, FL	New Smyrna Beach	5 ft 11 in (1.80 m)	170 lb (77 kg)	–	Feb 6, 2013
James Clark; WR	Recruit ratings: Scout: Rivals: ESPN:					
Gareon Conley; CB	Massillon, OH	Washington	6 ft 2 in (1.88 m)	170 lb (77 kg)	–	Dec 7, 2012
Gareon Conley; CB	Recruit ratings: Scout: Rivals: ESPN:					
Ezekiel Elliott; RB	St. Louis, MO	John Burroughs	6 ft 0 in (1.83 m)	198 lb (90 kg)	4.42	Apr 1, 2012
Ezekiel Elliott; RB	Recruit ratings: Scout: Rivals: ESPN:					
Timothy Gardner; OG	Indianapolis, IN	Lawrence Central	6 ft 5 in (1.96 m)	340 lb (150 kg)	–	Jul 28, 2012
Timothy Gardner; OG	Recruit ratings: Scout: Rivals: ESPN:					
Michael Hill; DT	Pendleton, SC	Pendleton	6 ft 3 in (1.91 m)	315 lb (143 kg)	–	Jun 27, 2012
Michael Hill; DT	Recruit ratings: Scout: Rivals: ESPN:					
Trey Johnson; MLB	Lawrenceville, GA	Central Gwinnett	6 ft 2 in (1.88 m)	220 lb (100 kg)	–	Jan 4, 2013
Trey Johnson; MLB	Recruit ratings: Scout: Rivals: ESPN:					
Darron Lee; S	New Albany, OH	New Albany	6 ft 2 in (1.88 m)	195 lb (88 kg)	4.5	Jun 26, 2012
Darron Lee; S	Recruit ratings: Scout: Rivals: ESPN:					
Tyquan Lewis; DE	Tarboro, NC	Tarboro	6 ft 3 in (1.91 m)	225 lb (102 kg)	4.77	Sep 20, 2012
Tyquan Lewis; DE	Recruit ratings: Scout: Rivals: ESPN:					
Evan Lisle; OT	Centerville, OH	Centervile	6 ft 6 in (1.98 m)	265 lb (120 kg)	–	Feb 28, 2012
Evan Lisle; OT	Recruit ratings: Scout: Rivals: ESPN:					
Jalin Marshall; WR	Middletown, OH	Middletown	6 ft 1 in (1.85 m)	190 lb (86 kg)	4.66	Jan 30, 2012
Jalin Marshall; WR	Recruit ratings: Scout: Rivals: ESPN:					
Mike Mitchell; OLB	Plano, TX	Prestonwood Christian Academy	6 ft 4 in (1.93 m)	225 lb (102 kg)	4.39	Jan 5, 2013
Mike Mitchell; OLB	Recruit ratings: Scout: Rivals: ESPN:					
Donovan Munger; DT	Shaker Heights, OH	Shaker Heights	6 ft 4 in (1.93 m)	290 lb (130 kg)	-	Dec 9, 2012
Donovan Munger; DT	Recruit ratings: Scout: Rivals: ESPN:					
Billy Price; DT	Youngstown, OH	Austintown Fitch	6 ft 4 in (1.93 m)	280 lb (130 kg)	–	Feb 13, 2012
Billy Price; DT	Recruit ratings: Scout: Rivals: ESPN:					
Corey Smith; WR	Akron, OH	Buchtel (via East Mississippi JC)	6 ft 0 in (1.83 m)	170 lb (77 kg)	4.5	Jan 11, 2013
Corey Smith; WR	Recruit ratings: Scout: Rivals: ESPN:					
Tracy Sprinkle; DE	Elyria, OH	Elyria	6 ft 4 in (1.93 m)	245 lb (111 kg)	–	Apr 17, 2012
Tracy Sprinkle; DE	Recruit ratings: Scout: Rivals: ESPN:					
Jayme Thompson; S	Toledo, OH	Central Catholic	6 ft 2 in (1.88 m)	183 lb (83 kg)	4.54	Apr 1, 2012
Jayme Thompson; S	Recruit ratings: Scout: Rivals: ESPN:					
Dontre Wilson; RB	DeSoto, TX	DeSoto	5 ft 10 in (1.78 m)	174 lb (79 kg)	4.51	Feb 4, 2013
Dontre Wilson; RB	Recruit ratings: Scout: Rivals: ESPN:					
Christopher Worley; OLB	Cleveland, OH	Glenville	6 ft 3 in (1.91 m)	195 lb (88 kg)	–	Jan 11, 2013
Christopher Worley; OLB	Recruit ratings: Scout: Rivals: ESPN:					
Overall recruit ranking: Scout: 1 Rivals: 2 ESPN: 3
Note: In many cases, Scout, Rivals, 247Sports, On3, and ESPN may conflict in their listings of height and weight.; In these cases, the average was taken. ESPN grades are on a 100-point scale.; Sources: "2013 Team Ranking". Rivals.com.

== Schedule ==
The Big Ten Conference released the schedules for the 2013 season on April 6, 2011. The Big Ten will continue the same scheduling alignment as they had during the 2011 and 2012 seasons. As a result, Ohio State will play all five Leaders Division opponents: Illinois, Indiana, Penn State, Purdue, and Wisconsin. Ohio State will also face three Legends Division opponents: Iowa, Northwestern, and Michigan, the permanent cross-division opponent. Ohio State will play four non-conference games: Buffalo of the Mid-American Conference, San Diego State of the Mountain West Conference, California of the Pac-12 Conference, and Florida A&M of the Mid-Eastern Athletic Conference. Ohio State has two bye weeks during the season, the first between their games against Northwestern and Iowa and their second between their games against Purdue and Illinois. Following their second consecutive undefeated season, Ohio State won the Leaders Division Championship and qualified to play in the Big Ten Championship Game against Michigan State, who defeated the Buckeyes 34–24. On December 8, Ohio State was selected to play in the Orange Bowl against Clemson.

All games during the 2013 season were broadcast on the Ohio State Football Radio Network. Paul Keels was head of the crew with play-by-play, Jim Lachey with color commentary, Marty Bannister as sideline and locker room reporter, and Skip Mosic serving as the pre-game and halftime show host.

Date	Time	Opponent	Rank	Site	TV	Result	Attendance
August 31	12:00 p.m.	Buffalo*	No. 2	Ohio Stadium; Columbus, OH	ESPN2	W 40–20	103,980
September 7	3:30 p.m.	San Diego State*	No. 3	Ohio Stadium; Columbus, OH	ABC/ESPN2	W 42–7	104,984
September 14	7:00 p.m.	at California*	No. 4	California Memorial Stadium; Berkeley, CA	FOX	W 52–34	62,467
September 21	12:00 p.m.	Florida A&M*	No. 4	Ohio Stadium; Columbus, OH	BTN	W 76–0	103,595
September 28	8:00 p.m.	No. 23 Wisconsin	No. 4	Ohio Stadium; Columbus, OH	ABC	W 31–24	105,826
October 5	8:00 p.m.	at No. 16 Northwestern	No. 4	Ryan Field; Evanston, IL (College GameDay)	ABC	W 40–30	47,330
October 19	3:30 p.m.	Iowa^{†}	No. 4	Ohio Stadium; Columbus, OH	ABC/ESPN2	W 34–24	105,264
October 26	8:00 p.m.	Penn State	No. 4	Ohio Stadium; Columbus, OH (rivalry)	ABC	W 63–14	105,889
November 2	12:00 p.m.	at Purdue	No. 4	Ross–Ade Stadium; West Lafayette, IN	BTN	W 56–0	51,423
November 16	12:00 p.m.	at Illinois	No. 3	Memorial Stadium; Champaign, IL (Illibuck)	ESPN	W 60–35	44,095
November 23	3:30 p.m.	Indiana	No. 4	Ohio Stadium; Columbus, OH	ABC/ESPN2	W 42–14	104,990
November 30	12:00 p.m.	at Michigan	No. 3	Michigan Stadium; Ann Arbor, MI (rivalry)	ABC	W 42–41	113,511
December 7	8:17 p.m.	vs. No. 10 Michigan State	No. 2	Lucas Oil Stadium; Indianapolis, IN (Big Ten Championship Game, College GameDay)	FOX	L 24–34	66,002
January 3, 2014	8:30 p.m.	vs. No. 8 Clemson*	No. 7	Sun Life Stadium; Miami Gardens, FL (Orange Bowl)	ESPN	L 35–40	72,080
*Non-conference game; ^{†}Homecoming; Rankings from AP Poll released prior to the game; All times are in Eastern time

== Game summaries ==
=== Buffalo ===
Team	1	2	3	4	Total
Buffalo	0	13	7	0	20
• #2 Ohio State	23	7	7	3	40

- Location: Columbus, Ohio
- Game start: 12:03 p.m.
- Elapsed time: 3:18
- Game attendance: 103,980
- Game weather: Partly Cloudy, 79 °F (26 °C)
- Referee: Shawn Smith
- TV announcers (ESPN2): Beth Mowins (play-by-play), Joey Galloway (color)

Scoring summary
1	10:04	Ohio State	Devin Smith 47-yard pass from Braxton Miller (Kenny Guiton rush)	Ohio State 8–0
1	7:05	Ohio State	Chris Fields 7-yard pass from Braxton Miller (Jordan Hall pass from Kenny Guiton)	Ohio State 16–0
1	0:38	Ohio State	Jordan Hall 49-yard run (Drew Basil kick)	Ohio State 23–0
2	9:18	Buffalo	Matt Weiser 16-yard pass from Joe Licata (Patrick Clarke kick)	Ohio State 23–7
2	7:10	Buffalo	Khalil Mack 45-yard interception return (Joe Licata pass failed)	Ohio State 23–13
2	6:53	Ohio State	Jordan Hall 37-yard run (Drew Basil kick)	Ohio State 30–13
3	10:21	Buffalo	Alex Neutz 10-yard pass from Joe Licata (Patrick Clarke kick)	Ohio State 30–20
3	3:16	Ohio State	Chris Fields 21-yard pass from Kenny Guiton (Drew Basil kick)	Ohio State 37–20
4	7:05	Ohio State	Drew Basil 39-yard field goal	Ohio State 40–20

The Buckeyes' opened the 2013 season against the Buffalo Bulls, who they defeated 40–20 in Columbus. A false start and delay of game penalty would force Buffalo to punt on their first possession. Following a 4-play drive, the Buckeyes' would score on a touchdown pass from Braxton Miller to Devin Smith, and after a Kenny Guiton two-point conversion run, Ohio State took an 8–0 lead. Ohio State would score again on their second drive after a 7-yard touchdown pass from Miller to Chris Fields, and would convert another two-point conversion on a pass from Guiton to Jordan Hall. A 49-yard Hall touchdown run on the Buckeyes' next possession gave the Buckeyes' a 23–0 lead after the first quarter.

Ohio State would be unable to capitalize on a Ron Tanner interception of Bull's quarterback Joe Licata, with freshman Dontre Wilson fumbling the ball on the next play. Buffalo would score their first points of the game on a 3-play drive that ended in a touchdown pass from Licata to Matt Weiser. Khalil Mack returned a Braxton Miller interception for a touchdown on the Buckeyes' ensuing possession and cut the Ohio State lead to 23–13. A 37-yard touchdown run from Jordan Hall would give Ohio State a 30–13 lead at halftime. Ryan Shazier, along with other Buckeyes players were carried off in the second quarter due to cramps in the hot weather.

Buffalo would score on their first possession of the second half on a 10-yard pass from Joe Licata to Alex Neutz. The Buckeyes' responded with a 14-play drive, which ended in a 21-yard touchdown pass from Kenny Guiton to Chris Fields, giving Ohio State a 37–20 lead. A 39-yard Drew Basil field goal in the fourth quarter would be the final scoring play. With the victory, Ohio State extended their winning streak to 13 games, dating back to the previous season, the longest streak in the nation. The Bull's received $1 million to play the game in Ohio Stadium.

=== San Diego State ===
Team	1	2	3	4	Total
San Diego State	0	0	7	0	7
• #3 Ohio State	21	14	7	0	42

- Location: Columbus, Ohio
- Game start: 3:36 p.m.
- Elapsed time: 3:11
- Game attendance: 104,984
- Game weather: Partly Cloudy, 82 °F (28 °C), Wind SW 8 mph (13 km/h)
- Referee: Jerry McGinn
- TV announcers (ABC): Sean McDonough (play-by-play), Chris Spielman (color)

Scoring summary
1	11:49	Ohio State	Dontre Wilson 7-yard run (Drew Basil kick)	Ohio State 7–0
1	6:23	Ohio State	Corey Brown 27-yard pass from Kenny Guiton (Drew Basil kick)	Ohio State 14–0
1	0:03	Ohio State	Jorand Hall 4-yard run (Drew Basil kick)	Ohio State 21–0
2	5:33	Ohio State	Kenny Guiton 44-yard run (Drew Basil kick)	Ohio State 28–0
2	3:15	Ohio State	Rod Smith 1-yard run (Drew Basil kick)	Ohio State 35–0
3	4:34	Ohio State	Corey Brown 24-yard pass from Kenny Guiton (Drew Basil kick)	Ohio State 42–0
4	7:05	San Diego State	Chad Young 2-yard pass from Quinn Kaehler (Wes Feer kick)	Ohio State 42–7

On November 2, 2012, Ohio State announced San Diego State would replace Vanderbilt on the 2013 schedule after the Commodores canceled the game. Ohio State defeated the Aztecs 42–7 in the second game of the season. The Buckeyes' scored on their first offensive possession on a 7-yard touchdown run from freshman Dontre Wilson. Starting quarterback Braxton Miller left the game after the first drive with a knee injury and was replaced by Kenny Guiton. The Buckeyes would be unable to capitalize following a Doran Grant interception on the Aztecs' ensuing possession. A touchdown pass from Guiton to Corey Brown and a 4-yard touchdown run from Jordan Hall gave Ohio State a 21–0 lead at the end of the first quarter.

Kenny Guiton threw his first interception early in the second quarter to Damontae Kazee, though Guiton would score on the Buckeyes' next offensive possession on a 44-yard run. A fumble and sack by Noah Spence gave the Buckeyes the ball in Aztec territory, which would lead to a Rod Smith touchdown run, giving Ohio State a 35–0 lead at halftime. Ohio State would score on their second drive of the third quarter on a Guiton touchdown pass to Corey Brown. The Buckeye defense would give up their first points against midway through the third quarter, following a 6 play, 72-yard drive by San Diego State. The Aztecs' scored a touchdown on a pass from Quinn Kaehler to Chad Young. Ohio State would run out the clock in the fourth quarter, ensuring the 42–7 victory. With the victory, Ohio State extended their winning streak to 14 games, and improved their overall record against San Diego State to 4–0.

=== California ===
Team	1	2	3	4	Total
• #4 Ohio State	24	7	21	0	52
California	14	6	7	7	34

- Location: Berkeley, California
- Game start: 7:05 p.m.
- Elapsed time: 3:32
- Game attendance: 62,467
- Game weather: Clear, 74 °F (23 °C), Wind SW 11 mph (18 km/h)
- Referee: Jay Stricherz
- TV announcers (Fox): Gus Johnson (play-by-play), Charles Davis (color)

Scoring summary
1	13:07	Ohio State	Devin Smith 90-yard pass from Kenny Guiton (Drew Basil kick)	Ohio State 7–0
1	11:27	Ohio State	Devin Smith 47-yard pass from Kenny Guiton (Drew Basil kick)	Ohio State 14–0
1	9:00	Ohio State	Chris Fields 1-yard pass from Kenny Guiton (Drew Basil kick)	Ohio State 21–0
1	8:01	California	James Grisom 61-yard pass from Jared Goff (Vincen D'Amato kick)	Ohio State 21–7
1	3:45	Ohio State	Drew Basil 39-yard field goal	Ohio State 24–7
1	0:55	California	Chris Harper 42-yard pass from Jared Goff (Vincen D'Amato kick)	Ohio State 24–14
2	8:20	Ohio State	Jordan Hall 1-yard run (Drew Basil kick)	Ohio State 31–14
2	4:32	California	Vincen D'Amato 27-yard field goal	Ohio State 31–17
2	0:00	California	Vincen D'Amato 43-yard field goal	Ohio State 31–20
3	12:06	Ohio State	Jordan Hall 1-yard run (Drew Basil kick)	Ohio State 38–20
3	5:26	Ohio State	Corey Brown 6-yard pass from Kenny Guiton (Drew Basil kick)	Ohio State 45–20
3	4:37	California	Bryce Treggs 14-yard pass from Jared Groff (Vincen D'Amato kick)	Ohio State 45–27
3	2:02	Ohio State	Jordan Hall 2-yard run (Drew Basil kick)	Ohio State 52–27
4	6:06	California	Daniel Lasco 1-yard run (Vincen D'Amato kick)	Ohio State 52–34

In their first road game of the 2013 season, Ohio State defeated the California Golden Bears of the Pac-12 Conference 52–34 in Berkeley. Kenny Guiton was named the starting quarterback prior to the game, replacing Braxton Miller, who was injured. Within the first five minutes of the game, the Buckeyes' jumped out to a 21–0 lead following 90 and 47-yard touchdown passes from Guiton to Devin Smith. A sack and forced fumble by Ryan Shazier on California's third drive of the game would help set up a 1-yard touchdown pass from Guiton to Chris Fields. The Golden Bears' first touchdown would come on their fourth drive, on a 61-yard reception thrown by Jared Goff to James Grisom. A Christian Bryant interception for the Buckeyes' would set up a 39-yard Drew Basil field goal. A 42-yard touchdown pass from Goff to Chris Harper would make the score 24–14, in favor of Ohio State, at the end of the first quarter. Following a 12 play, 74-yard drive, Ohio State extended their led to 31–14 following a 1-yard Jordan Hall touchdown run. Two field goals of 27 and 43-yards for California's Vincen D'Amato, would cut the Buckeye lead to 31–20 at halftime.

Ohio State would open the second half with possession of the ball, and scoring a touchdown on Jordan Hall's second touchdown run of the game. A 6-yard touchdown pass from Kenny Guiton to Corey Brown on their next possession, would make the score 45–20, in favor of the Buckeyes'. Jared Goff would throw his third touchdown pass of the day to Bryce Treggs midway through the third quarter. Hall's third touchdown run for the Buckeyes' would give Ohio State a 52–27 lead at the end of the third quarter. A 1-yard touchdown run for Daniel Lasco of the Golden Bears' would be the only scoring play of the fourth quarter, with the Buckeyes winning 52–34. Kenny Guiton was recognized as the Big Ten Offensive Player of the Week for his 276 passing yard and four touchdown passes, while Ryan Shazier was recognized as the Big Ten Defensive Player of the Week for his 12 tackles and forced fumble. With the victory, Ohio State's winning streak reached 15 games, and they improved their all-time record against California to 7–1.

=== Florida A&M ===
Team	1	2	3	4	Total
Florida A&M	0	0	0	0	0
• No. 4 Ohio State	34	21	14	7	76

- Location: Columbus, Ohio
- Game start: 12:02 p.m.
- Elapsed time: 2:59
- Game attendance: 103,595
- Game weather: Cloudy, 62 °F (17 °C), wind NNW 9 mph (14 km/h)
- Referee: Alex Kemp
- TV announcers (BTN): Matt Devlin (play-by-play), Glen Mason (color)

Scoring summary
1	12:57	Ohio State	Jordan Hall 3-yard run (Drew Basil kick)	Ohio State 7–0
1	11:50	Ohio State	Jeff Heuerman 11-yard pass from Kenny Guiton (Kenny Guiton pass failed)	Ohio State 13–0
1	9:25	Ohio State	Evan Spencer 8-yard pass from Kenny Guiton (Drew Basil kick)	Ohio State 20–0
1	0:32	Ohio State	Carlos Hyde 1-yard pass from Kenny Guiton (Drew Basil kick)	Ohio State 27–0
1	0:13	Ohio State	Devin Smith 5-yard pass from Kenny Guiton (Drew Basil kick)	Ohio State 34–0
2	11:35	Ohio State	Jordan Hall 18-yard run (Drew Basil kick)	Ohio State 41–0
2	6:09	Ohio State	Chris Fields 15-yard pass from Kenny Guiton (Drew Basil kick)	Ohio State 48–0
2	0:05	Ohio State	Evan Spencer 15-yard pass from Kenny Guiton (Drew Basil kick)	Ohio State 55–0
3	9:53	Ohio State	Ezekiel Elliott 16-yard run (Kyle Clinton kick)	Ohio State 62–0
3	2:26	Ohio State	Ezekiel Elliott 13-yard run (Kyle Clinton kick)	Ohio State 69–0
4	1:15	Ohio State	Cardale Jones 10-yard run (Kyle Clinton kick)	Ohio State 76–0

In their final non-conference game of the 2013 season, Ohio State defeated the Florida A&M Rattlers of the Mid-Eastern Athletic Conference, 76–0, in Columbus. Kenny Guiton was named the Buckeyes' starting quarterback for the second consecutive game. The Buckeyes scored on all five of their drives in the first quarter for a 34–0 lead. Jordan Hall scored Ohio State's first touchdown on a 3-yard run, while Guiton threw four touchdown passes to four separate receivers. A blocked punt by Doran Grant and an interception by Bradley Roby set up good field positions for the Buckeyes and scoring drives. Ohio State continued to roll in the second quarter, scoring three touchdowns on all of their drives, including an 18-yard run from Jordan Hall and two touchdown passes from Guiton. The six touchdown passes from Guiton in the first half were a new Ohio State single-game quarterback record.

The Buckeyes took out their starters in the third quarter and kept the ball on the ground for the remainder of the game. Freshman running back Ezekiel Elliott took advantage of the playing time, scoring two touchdown in the third quarter, on 16- and 13-yard runs, and gave Ohio State a 69–0 lead going into the fourth quarter. A 10-yard touchdown run from Cardale Jones in the fourth quarter was the final scoring play of the game. Kenny Guiton was recognized as the Big Ten Offensive Player of the Week for his six touchdown passes. With the victory, Ohio State's winning streak reached 16 games. The Rattlers received $900,000 to play the game in Ohio Stadium.

=== Wisconsin ===
Team	1	2	3	4	Total
#23 Wisconsin	7	7	0	10	24
• #4 Ohio State	14	10	7	0	31

- Location: Columbus, Ohio
- Game start: 8:13 p.m.
- Elapsed time: 3:20
- Game attendance: 105,826
- Game weather: Clear, 70 °F (21 °C), Wind SE 7 mph (11 km/h)
- Referee: Dan Capron
- TV announcers (ABC): Brent Musburger (play-by-play), Kirk Herbstreit (color)

Scoring summary
1	12:18	Ohio State	Evan Spencer 25-yard pass from Braxton Miller (Drew Basil kick)	Ohio State 7–0
1	3:52	Wisconsin	Jared Abbrederis 36-yard pass from Joel Stave (Kyle French kick)	7–7
1	0:44	Ohio State	Devin Smith 26-yard pass from Braxton Miller (Drew Basil kick)	Ohio State 14–7
2	4:33	Ohio State	Drew Basil 45-yard field goal	Ohio State 17–7
2	1:30	Wisconsin	Sam Arneson 11-yard run Joel Stave (Kyle French kick)	Ohio State 17–14
2	0:01	Ohio State	Corey Brown 40-yard pass from Braxton Miller (Drew Basil kick)	Ohio State 24–14
3	2:18	Ohio State	Corey Brown 1-yard pass from Braxton Miller (Drew Basil kick)	Ohio State 31–14
4	13:47	Wisconsin	James White 17-yard run (Kyle French kick)	Ohio State 31–21
4	2:05	Wisconsin	Kyle French 42-yard field goal	Ohio State 31–24

In their first conference game of the 2013 season, Ohio State defeated the Wisconsin Badgers 31–24 in Columbus. Braxton Miller was named as the starting quarterback for the first time in two weeks and would throw a 21-yard touchdown pass on the Buckeyes' first offensive possession. Wisconsin would tie the game up on their second offensive possession with a 36-yard touchdown pass from Joel Stave to Jared Abbrederis. The Buckeyes' would respond with a 26-yard touchdown pass from Miller to Devin Smith, giving Ohio State a 14–7 lead at the end of the first quarter.

Ohio State would extend their lead early in the second quarter, with a 45-yard Drew Basil field goal. Joel Stave would throw his second touchdown pass the Same Arneson, bringing the Buckeye lead back to one possession. In the final minutes of the half, the Buckeye offense would drive down the field and score on a touchdown pass from Braxton Miller to Corey Brown, giving the Ohio State a 24–14 at halftime. The Badgers' would commit their first turnover in the third quarter on a pass intercepted by Bradley Roby. Ohio State would score a touchdown reception by Corey Brown, giving Ohio State a 31–14 lead.

Wisconsin would put together a 9-play, 75-yard drive in the fourth quarter, which resulted in a touchdown run from James White. The Badgers' again received the ball with less than five minutes remaining and were able to drive down to the Buckeye 24 yard line and would ultimately settle for a 42-yard field goal. The Buckeyes' recovered the ensuing onside kick and would seal the 31–24 victory. Braxton Miller was recognized as the Big Ten Offensive Player of the Week after completing 17 of 25 pass attempts for 198 yards, while Cameron Johnston was named the Big Ten Special Teams Player of the Week. During the game senior safety Christian Bryant sustained an ankle injury during the game, which ultimately ended his season and career at Ohio State. With the victory, Ohio State's winning streak reached 17 games, and they improved their overall record against Wisconsin to 56–18–5.

=== Northwestern ===
Team	1	2	3	4	Total
• No. 4 Ohio State	10	3	7	20	40
No. 16 Northwestern	7	13	3	7	30

- Location: Evanston, Illinois
- Game start: 8:13 p.m.
- Elapsed time: 3:24
- Game attendance: 47,330
- Game weather: Scattered showers, 68 °F (20 °C), wind E 3 mph (4.8 km/h)
- Referee: Mike Cannon
- TV announcers (ABC): Brent Musburger (play-by-play), Kirk Herbstreit (color)

Scoring summary
1	12:31	Ohio State	Drew Basil 27-yard field goal	Ohio State 3–0
1	8:00	Northwestern	Kain Colter 9-yard pass from Trevor Siemian (Jeff Budzien kick)	Northwestern 7–3
1	2:33	Ohio State	Bradley Roby blocked punt return (Drew Basil kick)	Ohio State 10–7
2	13:19	Northwestern	Kain Colter 2-yard run (Jeff Budzien kick)	Northwestern 14–10
2	8:36	Ohio State	Drew Basil 20-yard field goal	Northwestern 14–13
2	5:00	Northwestern	Jeff Budzien 23-yard field goal	Northwestern 17–13
2	0:56	Northwestern	Jeff Budzien 29-yard field goal	Northwestern 20–13
3	10:40	Northwestern	Jeff Budzien 32-yard field goal	Northwestern 23–13
3	3:54	Ohio State	Carlos Hyde 4-yard run (Drew Basil kick)	Northwestern 23–20
4	11:29	Ohio State	Carlos Hyde 2-yard run (Drew Basil kick)	Ohio State 27–23
4	9:10	Northwestern	Cameron Dickerson 12-yard pass from Trevor Siemian (Jeff Budzien kick)	Northwestern 30–27
4	5:22	Ohio State	Carlos Hyde 7-yard run (Drew Basil kick)	Ohio State 34–30
4	0:00	Ohio State	Joey Bosa fumble recovery	Ohio State 40–30

For the first time since 2008, Ohio State played Northwestern in Evanston, and in the game Ohio State defeated the Wildcats 40–30. Ohio State received the opening kickoff and scored first on a Drew Basil 27-yard field goal. Tyler Scott forced a fumble on Ohio State's second possession, giving the Wildcats the ball deep in Ohio State territory. Northwestern took advantage of the turnover, scoring on a touchdown pass from Trevor Siemiah to Kain Colter, giving the Wildcats the 7–3 lead. A blocked punt in the shadow of Northwestern's endzone by Bradley Roby gave Ohio State their first touchdown and a 10–7 lead at the end of the first quarter.

Ohio State's first drive of the second quarter covered 72 yards, and resulted in a 20-yard field goal from Basil. Northwestern scored on all of their drives in the second quarter, including a Kain Colter touchdown run, along with Jeff Budzien field goals, giving the Wildcats a 20–13 lead at halftime. Northwestern extended their lead on the first possession of the second half, driving 60 yards and taking a ten-point lead following a 32-yard field goal from Budzien. Ohio State committed third turnover on their first possession of the half, after a Braxton Miller fumble. A touchdown run from Carlos Hyde on the Buckeyes' next offensive drive would cut the Wildcat lead down to one possession.

Doran Grant intercepted a Trevor Siemian pass early in the fourth quarter, setting up the Buckeyes deep within Northwestern territory. Hyde's second touchdown run gave Ohio State the lead again at 27–23. Northwestern responded with a Cameron Dickerson 12-yard touchdown reception from Siemian. Ohio State took the lead for good after a third touchdown run from Hyde, following an 81-yard drive. A Wildcat fumbled lateral recovered by Joey Bosa made the final score 40–30. Hyde was recognized as Big Ten co-Offensive Player of the Week for his three touchdown runs, Roby was recognized as the Big Ten Special Teams Player of the Week, while Bosa was named Big Ten Freshman of the Week. With the victory, Ohio State's winning streak reached 18 games, and they improved their overall record against Northwestern to 60–14–1.

=== Iowa ===
Team	1	2	3	4	Total
Iowa	10	7	7	0	24
• #4 Ohio State	3	7	14	10	34

- Location: Columbus, Ohio
- Game start: 3:37 p.m.
- Elapsed time: 3:11
- Game attendance: 105,264
- Game weather: Cloudy, 46 °F (8 °C), Wind N 13 mph (21 km/h)
- Referee: Bill LeMonnier
- TV announcers (ABC): Bob Wischusen (play-by-play), Rod Gilmore (color)

Scoring summary
1	9:23	Iowa	C.J. Fiedorowicz 2-yard pass from Jake Rudock (Mike Meyer kick)	Iowa 7–0
1	4:00	Ohio State	Drew Basil 27-yard field goal	Iowa 7–3
1	0:07	Iowa	Mike Meyer 28-yard field goal	Iowa 10–3
2	13:58	Ohio State	Corey Brown 58-yard pass Braxton Miller (Drew Basil kick)	10–10
2	7:21	Iowa	Kevonte Martin-Manley 6-yard pass from Jake Rudock (Mike Meyer kick)	Iowa 17–10
3	10:18	Ohio State	Carlos Hyde 1-yard run (Drew Basil kick)	17–17
3	3:15	Ohio State	Devin Smith 14-yard pass from Braxton Miller (Drew Basil kick)	Ohio State 24–17
3	2:30	Iowa	Jake Duzey 85-yard pass from Jake Rudock (Mike Meyer kick)	24–24
4	13:24	Ohio State	Carlos Hyde 19-yard run (Drew Basil kick)	Ohio State 31–24
4	5:50	Ohio State	Drew Basil 25-yard field goal	Ohio State 34–24

In their seventh game of the 2013 season and their third conference game, Ohio State defeated the Iowa Hawkeyes 34–24 in Columbus. Iowa received the opening kickoff and put together a 12-play, 80-yard drive that resulted in a 2-yard touchdown reception from Jake Rudock to C. J. Fiedorowicz, giving the Hawkeyes a 7–0 lead. Ohio State would respond on their first offensive drive by putting together a 12 play drive of their own that ended in a 27-yard Drew Basil field goal. Iowa again drove down the field on their second drive and would score on a Mike Meyer 28-yard field goal, giving the Hawkeyes a 10–3 lead at the end of the first quarter. Three plays into the second quarter Braxton Miller threw a 58-yard touchdown pass to Corey Browing, which tied the game. Iowa took the lead on their next possession on a Jake Rudock touchdown pass to Kevonte Martin-Manley.

Ohio State would start the second half with a 1-yard touchdown run from Carlos Hyde. After a defensive stop, Braxton Miller touchdown pass to Devin Smith, which gave Ohio State a 24–17 lead. Iowa would respond on their next possession with one play, an 85-yard touchdown pass from Jake Rudock to Jake Duzey, tying the score again. In the fourth quarter, Ohio State would score on a second Hyde touchdown run, as well as a 25-yard field goal from Drew Basil. For the first time since the 2008 season, the Buckeyes' did not punt a single time in the game. With the victory, Ohio State's winning streak reached 19 games, and they improved their overall record against Iowa to 46–14–3 (47–14–3 without NCAA vacations and forfeits).

=== Penn State ===
Team	1	2	3	4	Total
Penn State	0	7	0	7	14
• #4 Ohio State	14	28	14	7	63

- Location: Columbus, Ohio
- Game start: 8:13 p.m.
- Elapsed time: 3:19
- Game attendance: 105,889
- Game weather: Mostly Cloudy, 45 °F (7 °C), Wind SW 11 mph (18 km/h)
- Referee: Dave Witvoet
- TV announcers (ABC): Brad Nessler (play-by-play), Todd Blackledge (color)

Scoring summary
1	12:43	Ohio State	Carlos Hyde 2-yard run (Drew Basil kick)	Ohio State 7–0
1	1:10	Ohio State	Braxton Miller 39-yard run (Drew Basil kick)	Ohio State 14–0
2	13:00	Ohio State	Braxton Miller 6-yard run (Drew Basil kick)	Ohio State 21–0
2	8:24	Ohio State	Chris Fields 3-yard pass from Braxton Miller (Drew Basil kick)	Ohio State 28–0
2	4:12	Penn State	Brandon Felder 12-yard pass from Christian Hackenberg (Sam Ficken kick)	Ohio State 28–7
2	3:16	Ohio State	Carlos Hyde 39-yard run (Drew Basil kick)	Ohio State 35–7
2	0:03	Ohio State	Corey Brown 25-yard pass from Braxton Miller (Drew Basil kick)	Ohio State 42–7
3	8:52	Ohio State	Dontre Wilson 26-yard pass from Braxton Miller (Drew Basil kick)	Ohio State 49–7
3	4:01	Ohio State	Kenny Guiton 2-yard run (Drew Basil kick)	Ohio State 56–7
4	8:24	Ohio State	Kenny Guiton 11-yard run (Drew Basil kick)	Ohio State 63–7
4	7:33	Penn State	Allen Robinson 65-yard pass from Tyler Ferguson (Same Ficken kick)	Ohio State 63–14

In their annual rivalry game, Ohio State defeated the Penn State Nittany Lions in Columbus 63–14. Ohio State opened the game with a 7-play, 75-yard drive and scored on a two-yard run from Carlos Hyde. Corey Brown would force an interception on the Nittany Lions' first offensive drive, though the Buckeye offense was unable to capitalize. Ohio State would score the next three touchdowns unanswered, giving the Buckeyes' a 28–0 lead. Two touchdowns came on 39-yard and 6-yard runs from Braxton Miller, with the third coming on a 3-yard pass from Miller to Chris Fields. Penn State would get on the board midway through the second quarter, scoring on a 12-yard pass from Christian Hackenberg to Brandon Felder. A 39-yard run by Hyde, along with a 25-yard pass from Miller to Corey Brown would give Ohio State a 42–7 lead at halftime.

Curtis Grant would recover a fumble on Penn State's second drive of the third quarter and set up the Buckeye offense in Penn State territory. Ohio State would capitalize on the turnover, scoring on a 26-yard pass from Braxton Miller to Dontre Wilson. A 2-yard touchdown run from Kenny Guiton on the Buckeyes' next offensive drive would give Ohio State a 56–7 lead at the end of the third quarter. Guiton and the Buckeye offense would complete a 13-play, 79-yard drive early in the fourth quarter that would end with another Guiton touchdown run. A 65-yard pass from Tyler Ferguson to Allen Robinson would give Penn State their second touchdown of the game, making the final score 63–14. Braxton Miller was recognized at the Big Ten Offensive Player of the Week for his five touchdowns, while Dontre Wilson was recognized as the Big Ten Freshman of the Week for his touchdown reception and 96 all-purpose yards. With the victory, Ohio State's winning streak reached 20 games, and they improved their overall record against Penn State to 15–13 (16–13 without NCAA vacations and forfeits)(Penn States vacated wins were re-instated by the NCAA).

=== Purdue ===
Team	1	2	3	4	Total
• #4 Ohio State	28	14	7	7	56
Purdue	0	0	0	0	0

- Location: West Lafayette, Indiana
- Game start: 12:01 p.m.
- Elapsed time: 3:09
- Game attendance: 51,423
- Game weather: Partly Cloudy, 47 °F (8 °C), Wind NW 10 mph (16 km/h)
- Referee: Jerry McGinn
- TV announcers (BTN): Kevin Kugler (play-by-play), Glen Mason (color)

Scoring summary
1	14:03	Ohio State	Doran Grant 33-yard interception return (Drew Basil kick)	Ohio State 7–0
1	11:28	Ohio State	Jeff Heuerman 40-yard pass from Braxton Miller (Drew Basil kick)	Ohio State 14–0
1	2:37	Ohio State	Nick Vannett 8-yard pass from Braxton Miller (Drew Basil kick)	Ohio State 21–0
1	2:10	Ohio State	Corey Brown 2-yard pass from Braxton Miller (Drew Basil kick)	Ohio State 28–0
2	8:20	Ohio State	Chris Fields 1-yard pass from Kenny Guiton (Drew Basil kick)	Ohio State 35–0
2	1:46	Ohio State	Ezekiel Elliott 10-yard pass from Braxton Miller (Drew Basil kick)	Ohio State 42–0
3	11:20	Ohio State	Kenny Guiton 4-yard run (Drew Basil kick)	Ohio State 49–0
4	10:37	Ohio State	Kenny Guiton 1-yard run (Drew Basil kick)	Ohio State 56–0

In their ninth game of the 2013 season, Ohio State shutout the Purdue Boilermakers 56–0 in West Lafayette. The Buckeyes' took a 14–0 lead within minutes of the kickoff, scoring on an interception by Doran Grant on the second play of the game, as well as a 40-yard pass from Braxton Miller to Jeff Heuerman. Later in the quarter, Ohio State would put together a 6-play, 62-yard drive that would end with a Braxton Miller pass to Nick Vannett and give the Buckeyes a three possession lead. Noah Spence would force a fumble, which would allow the Buckeyes' to score on a 2-yard touchdown pass from Miller to Corey Brown giving Ohio State a 28–0 lead.

In the second quarter Kenny Guiton would come in and throw a one-yard touchdown pass to Chris Fields. Ohio State's final drive of the half would end in a 10-yard touchdown pass from Braxton Miller to freshman Ezekiel Elliott, with the Buckeyes' taking a 42–0 lead into halftime. Guiton would again lead the Buckeyes' into the endzone, this time on the first drive of the third quarter, this time running four yards for the touchdown.

The Buckeye defense would force their second shutout of the season, holding the Boilermakers out of Ohio State territory for most of the game. Kenny Guiton would score his second touchdown on the ground, this time running one yard for the score, and giving Ohio State a 56–0 lead. With the victory, Ohio State's winning streak reached 21 games, and they improved their overall record against Purdue to 39–14–2 (40–14–5 without NCAA vacations and forfeits).

=== Illinois ===
Illibuck

Team	1	2	3	4	Total
• #3 Ohio State	21	14	9	16	60
Illinois	0	14	7	14	35

- Location: Champaign, Illinois
- Game start: 12:01 p.m.
- Elapsed time: 3:50
- Game attendance: 44,095
- Game weather: Cloudy, 55 °F (13 °C), Wind S 18 mph (29 km/h)
- Referee: Todd Geerlings
- TV announcers (ESPN): Dave Pasch (play-by-play), Brian Griese (color)

Scoring summary
1	14:24	Ohio State	Braxton Miller 70-yard run (Drew Basil kick)	Ohio State 7–0
1	4:55	Ohio State	Carlos Hyde 18-yard pass from Braxton Miller (Drew Basil kick)	Ohio State 14–0
1	3:30	Ohio State	Bradley Roby 63-yard interception return (Drew Basil kick)	Ohio State 21–0
2	10:20	Ohio State	Corey Brown 11-yard pass from Braxton Miller (Drew Basil kick)	Ohio State 28–0
2	7:29	Illinois	V'Angelo Bentley 67-yard punt return (Taylor Zalewski kick)	Ohio State 28–7
2	5:47	Ohio State	Carlos Hyde 8-yard run (Drew Basil kick)	Ohio State 35–7
2	2:25	Illinois	Steve Hull 19-yard pass from Nate Scheelhaase (Taylor Zalewski kick)	Ohio State 35–14
3	12:06	Illinois	Evan Wilson 1-yard pass from Nate Scheelhaase (Taylor Zalewski kick)	Ohio State 35–21
3	4:59	Ohio State	Team safety	Ohio State 37–21
3	4:01	Ohio State	Carlos Hyde 1-yard run (Drew Basil kick)	Ohio State 44–21
4	14:22	Illinois	Nate Scheelhaase 5-yard run (Miles Osei pass from Nate Scheelhaase)	Ohio State 44–29
4	10:43	Ohio State	Drew Basil 30-yard field goal	Ohio State 47–29
4	8:49	Illinois	Josh Ferguson 4-yard run (Nate Scheelhaase pass failed)	Ohio State 47–35
4	4:03	Ohio State	Carlos Hyde 51-yard run (Drew Basil kick failed)	Ohio State 53–35
4	2:09	Ohio State	Carlos Hyde 55-yard run (Drew Basil kick)	Ohio State 60–35

In their annual rivalry game, Ohio State defeated the Illinois Fighting Illini 60–35 in Champaign. Ohio State quickly jumped out to a 21–0 lead, scoring on 70-yard run by Braxton Miller, an 18-yard pass from Miller to Carlos Hyde, as well as an interception return by Bradley Roby. The Buckeyes' would extend the lead to 28–0 in the second quarter on a Corey Brown reception. Illinois would score their first points of the day on a 67-yard punt return from V'Angelo Bentley. The Buckeyes' responded with a six play drive, which concluded in a Hyde touchdown run. An Illinois drive towards the end of the first half would cover 75 yards and end on a touchdown pass from Nate Scheelhaase to Steve Hull, making the score 35–14 at halftime.

Illinois received the ball to open the third quarter and would score on a second touchdown pass from Scheelhaase, this time to Evan Wilson, making it a two possession game. Ohio State would fumble on their ensuing drive. The Buckeyes' defense would score again, this time by sacking Scheelhaase in the endzone for the safety, which would result in a Carlos Hyde touchdown and giving Ohio State the 44–21 lead.

The Illini and Nate Scheelhaase would respond, scoring a touchdown on the third play of the fourth quarter, and by converting the two point conversion, would make it a two possession game once again. A Drew Basil field goal on the next Buckeye drive would be answered by an Illinois touchdown, this time by Josh Ferguson. A third Carlos Hyde touchdown run late in the fourth quarter would put the game out of reach for the Illini, with Hyde's fourth touchdown on Ohio State's next offensive drive being the final scoring play of the game. For scoring four touchdowns in the game and rushing for 246 yards, fourth most in Buckeye history, Hyde was recognized as the Big Ten Offensive Player of the Week. Ryan Shazier, who had 16 tackles, was recognized as the Big Ten Defensive Player of the Week. With the victory, Ohio State's winning streak reached 22 games, and they improved their overall record against Illinois to 65–30–4 (66–30–4 without NCAA vacations and forfeits).

=== Indiana ===
Team	1	2	3	4	Total
Indiana	0	0	0	14	14
• #4 Ohio State	14	14	7	7	42

- Location: Columbus, Ohio
- Game start: 3:34 p.m.
- Elapsed time: 3:07
- Game attendance: 104,990
- Game weather: Snow showers, 33 °F (1 °C), Wind NW 15 mph (24 km/h)
- Referee: Dave Witvoet
- TV announcers (ABC): Dave Flemming (play-by-play), Chris Spielman (color)

Scoring summary
1	12:41	Ohio State	Carlos Hyde 16-yard run (Drew Basil kick)	Ohio State 7–0
1	8:11	Ohio State	Braxton Miller 37-yard run (Drew Basil kick)	Ohio State 14–0
2	8:36	Ohio State	Braxton Miller 5-yard run (Drew Basil kick)	Ohio State 21–0
2	0:37	Ohio State	Carlos Hyde 5-yard run (Drew Basil kick)	Ohio State 28–0
3	4:44	Ohio State	Dontre Wilson 24-yard pass from Braxton Miller (Drew Basil kick)	Ohio State 35–0
4	10:37	Ohio State	Devin Smith 39-yard pass from Braxton Miller (Drew Basil kick)	Ohio State 42–0
4	5:59	Indiana	Shane Wynn 4-yard pass from Nate Sudfeld (Mitch Ewald kick)	Ohio State 42–7
4	2:03	Indiana	D'Angelo Roberts 25-yard pass from Nate Sudfeld (Mitch Ewald kick)	Ohio State 42–14

In the final home game of the 2013 season, Ohio State defeated the Indiana Hoosiers 42–14 in Columbus. Ohio State shutout the Hoosiers through the first three quarter of the game, and would jump out to another fast start in the first quarter, going up 14–0. The Buckeyes' scored on their first possession of the game on a 16-yard Carlos Hyde run, and would score on their second possession with a 37-yard Braxton Miller run. A blocked punt by Bradley Roby would set up the Ohio State offense at the Hoosier 8 yard line. The Buckeyes' would score two plays later Braxton Miller would score his second rushing touchdown of the game. Following a sack by Michael Bennett on fourth down, Ohio State drove 69 yards and scored on a Carlos Hyde run in the closing seconds of the second quarter, giving the Buckeyes' a 28–0 lead a halftime.

Indiana would open up the second half with a 13 play drive, but would fail to score after Mitch Ewald missed a 41-yard field goal. Ohio State would score their fifth touchdown on a 24-yard pass from Braxton Miller to freshman Dontre Wilson. A fumble forced by Ryan Shazier at the end of the third quarter would keep the Hoosiers' out of the endzone. The Buckeyes' would score on a touchdown pass from Miller to Devin Smith at the start of the fourth quarter, giving them a 42–0 lead. Indiana would score on two Nate Sudfeld passes in the fourth quarter, the first to Shane Wynn, and the second to D'Angelo Roberts, making the final score 42–14. Ryan Shazier was recognized as the Big Ten Defensive Player of the Week for his 16 tackles. With the victory, Ohio State's winning streak reached 23 games, a school record. The Buckeyes' improved their overall record against Indiana to 69–12–5 (70–12–5 without NCAA vacations and forfeits).

=== Michigan ===
The Game

Team	1	2	3	4	Total
• #3 Ohio State	14	7	14	7	42
Michigan	14	7	0	20	41

- Location: Ann Arbor, Michigan
- Game start: 12:06 p.m.
- Elapsed time: 3:32
- Game attendance: 113,511
- Game weather: Partly Cloudy, 37 °F (3 °C), Wind S 13 mph (21 km/h)
- Referee: Mike Cannon
- TV announcers (ABC): Brad Nessler (color), Todd Blackledge (play-by-play)

Scoring summary
1	9:24	Michigan	Devin Gardner 1-yard run (Matt Wile kick)	Michigan 7–0
1	5:08	Ohio State	Devin Smith 53-yard pass from Braxton Miller (Drew Basil kick)	7–7
1	2:11	Michigan	Fitzgerald Toussaint 4-yard run (Matt Wile kick)	Michigan 14–7
1	0:55	Ohio State	Braxton Miller 53-yard run (Drew Basil kick)	14–14
2	14:28	Michigan	Jeremy Gallon 17-yard pass from Devin Gardner (Matt Wile kick)	Michigan 21–14
2	1:03	Ohio State	Braxton Miller 21-yard run (Drew Basil kick)	21–21
3	6:59	Ohio State	Braxton Miller 3-yard run (Drew Basil kick)	Ohio State 28–21
3	1:05	Ohio State	Jeff Heuerman 22-yard pass from Braxton Miller (Drew Basil kick)	Ohio State 35–21
4	11:15	Michigan	Drew Dileo 11-yard pass from Devin Gardner (Matt Wile kick)	Ohio State 35–28
4	5:01	Michigan	Jake Butt 2-yard pass from Devin Gardner (Matt Wile kick)	35–35
4	2:20	Ohio State	Carlos Hyde 1-yard run (Drew Basil kick)	Ohio State 42–35
4	0:32	Michigan	Devin Funchess 2-yard pass from Devin Gardner (Devin Gardner pass intercepted)	Ohio State 42–41

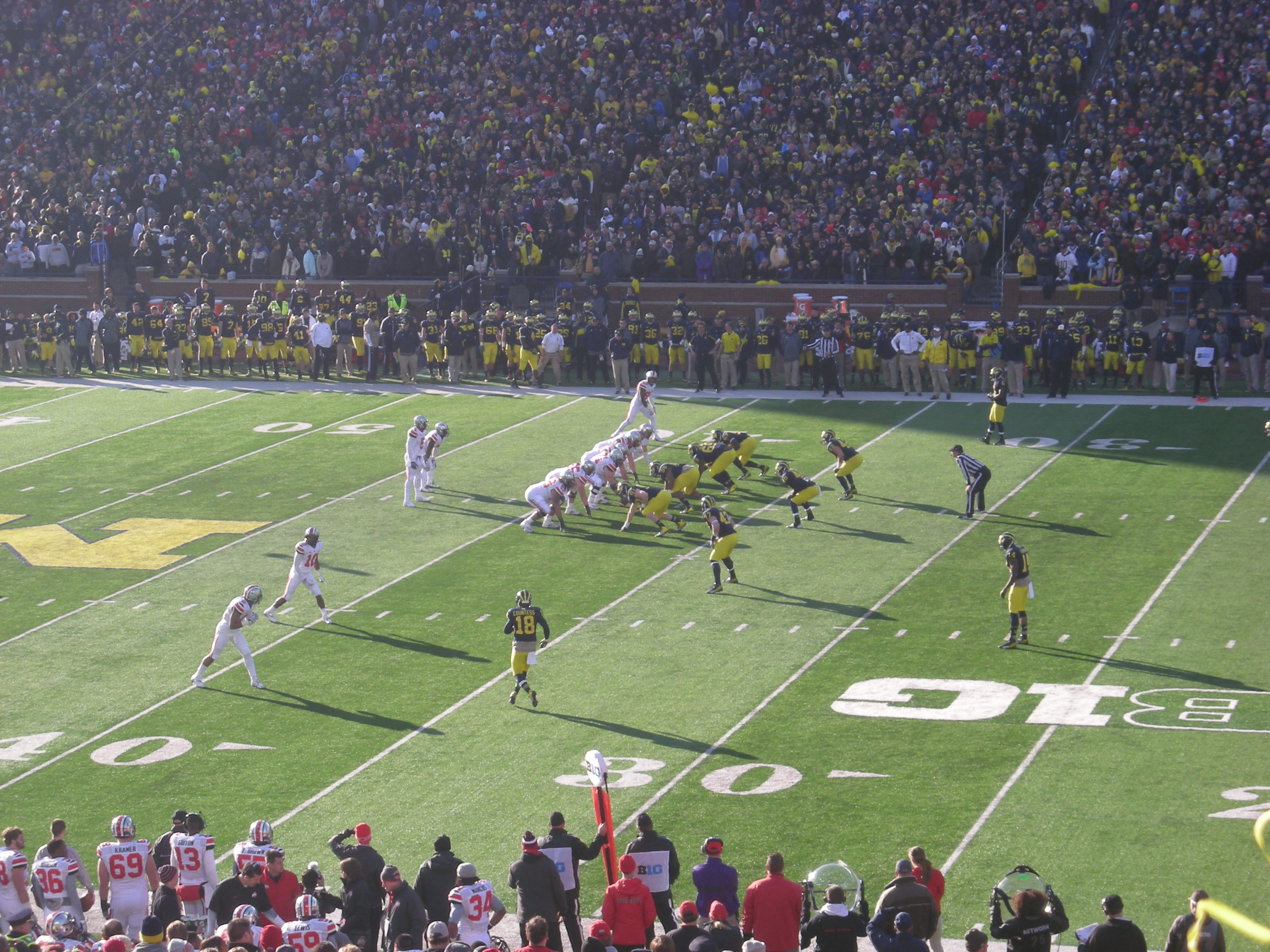
Ohio State lines up on offense near midfield.

In the 2013 edition of The Game, Ohio State defeated the Michigan Wolverines 42–41 in Ann Arbor. After forcing a punt on the Buckeyes' first possession of the game, the Wolverines' would drive 99 yards in 5 plays, scoring on a 1-yard run from Devin Gardner. Ohio State responded with a 53-yard touchdown pass from Braxton Miller to Devin Smith. A 4-yard touchdown run from Fitzgerald Toussaint on Michigan's next drive, along with a 53-yard touchdown run from Miller tied the game 14–14 at the end of the first quarter. Michigan, who would score on their first three drives of the game, took the lead on a touchdown pass from Gardner to Jeremy Gallon early in the second quarter. Ohio State would score their third touchdown of the day in the final minutes of the half on a 21-yard Miller run, tying the score 21–21 at halftime.

A fumble recovered by Tyvis Powell midway through the third quarter would set up the Buckeyes' 56-yard drive, culminating in a 3-yard touchdown run from Braxton Miller. A 22-yard touchdown pass from Miller to Jeff Heuerman on the ensuing Buckeye drive gave Ohio State the 35–21 lead at the end of the third quarter. A Devin Gardner touchdown pass to Drew Dileo early in the fourth quarter would cut the Buckeye lead down to one possession. A Carlos Hyde fumble on the following Buckeye drive set up the Wolverines in Ohio State territory, with Gardner throwing his third touchdown pass to Jake Butt and tying the score 35–35. Ohio State would drive 65 yard on their ensuing possession and take the lead on a Hyde touchdown run. The Wolverines' would put together an 11-play, 84-yard drive at the end of the game, scoring on a Gardner touchdown pass to Devin Funchess. The Wolverines attempted at two-point conversion for the victory, though it would fail after Tyvis Powell intercepted Gardner's pass attempt.

With the victory, Ohio State secured their second consecutive undefeated regular season, along with extending their winning streak to 24 games. The 83 points scored between both teams was the second most in the history of "The Game", with 86 points being scored in 1902. With their second consecutive victory over Michigan, Ohio State improved their overall record against Michigan to 45–58–6 (46–58–6 without NCAA vacations and forfeits).

=== Michigan State ===
Big Ten Championship Game

Team	1	2	3	4	Total
#2 Ohio State	0	10	14	0	24
• #10 Michigan State	3	14	3	14	34

- Location: Indianapolis, Indiana
- Game start: 8:19 p.m.
- Elapsed time: 3:38
- Game attendance: 66,002
- Game weather: Indoors
- Referee: Dan Capron
- TV announcers (Fox): Gus Johnson (play-by-play), Charles Davis (color)

Scoring summary
1	8:31	Michigan State	Michael Geiger 40-yard field goal	Michigan State 3–0
2	14:50	Michigan State	Keith Mumphrey 72-yard pass from Connor Cook (Michael Geiger kick)	Michigan State 10–0
2	9:01	Michigan State	Tony Lippett 33-yard pass from Connor Cook (Michael Geiger kick)	Michigan State 17–0
2	6:26	Ohio State	Corey Brown 20-yard pass from Braxton Miller (Drew Basil kick)	Michigan State 17–7
2	0:00	Ohio State	Drew Basil 28-yard field goal	Michigan State 17–10
3	12:21	Ohio State	Braxton Miller 8-yard run (Drew Basil kick)	17–17
3	5:36	Ohio State	Braxton Miller 6-yard run (Drew Basil kick)	Ohio State 24–17
3	2:29	Michigan State	Michael Geiger 44-yard field goal	Ohio State 24–20
4	11:41	Michigan State	Josiah Price 9-yard pass from Connor Cook (Michael Geiger kick)	Michigan State 27–24
4	2:16	Michigan State	Jeremy Langford 26-yard run (Michael Geiger kick)	Michigan State 34–24

In the program's first appearance in the Big Ten Championship Game, Ohio State was defeated by the Michigan State Spartans 34–24. The Spartans' would receive the ball first and put together a 14-play drive that would cover 47 yards and end in a Michael Geiger 40-yard field goal, giving Michigan State the 3–0 lead, which would be the only scoring drive of the first quarter. Michigan State would extend their lead early in the second quarter, with two touchdown passes from Connor Cook to Keith Mumphery and Tony Lippett, giving the Spartans' the 17–0 advantage. The Buckeyes' would score their first points on their fourth drive of the game, which would end in a touchdown pass from Braxton Miller to Corey Brown. Ohio State would score the final points of the half on a 28-yard field goal from Drew Basil, and cutting the Spartan lead to 17–10 at halftime.

Ohio State, who received the ball to open the second half, would tie the game up following a Braxton Miller 8-yard run. Ohio State would fail to capitalize on an interception from C.J. Barnett on the ensuing Spartan possession. The Buckeyes would take their first lead of the game midway through the third quarter after a 6-yard touchdown run from Miller, and giving Ohio State the 24–17 advantage. A field goal by Michael Geiger would cut the Ohio State lead to 24–20 at the end of the third quarter.

Michigan State would take the lead once again early in the fourth quarter after a touchdown pass from Cook to Josiah Price. Ohio State would fail to convert a fourth down midway through the fourth quarter and give the ball back the Spartans, who would drive 61 yards in 6 plays, putting the Buckeyes away after a 26-yard Jeremy Langford touchdown run. The touchdown run would be the final scoring play of the game, with Michigan State defeated Ohio State 34–24. The loss ended Ohio State's 24-game win streak, the longest in school history and brought Ohio State's all-time record against the Spartans to 28–14.

=== Clemson ===
Discover Orange Bowl

Team	1	2	3	4	Total
#7 Ohio State	9	13	7	6	35
• #12 Clemson	14	6	14	6	40

- Location: Miami Gardens, Florida
- Game start: 8:32 p.m.
- Elapsed time: 3:45
- Game attendance: 72,080
- Game weather: Mostly Cloudy, 64 °F (18 °C), Wind N 10 mph (16 km/h)
- Referee: John McDaid
- TV announcers (ESPN): Joe Tessitore (play-by-play), Matt Millen (color)

Scoring summary
1	12:50	Clemson	Tajh Boyd 48-yard run (Chandler Catanzaro kick)	Clemson 7–0
1	5:44	Ohio State	Braxton Miller 33-yard run (Drew Basil kick)	7–7
1	4:56	Clemson	Sammy Watkins 34-yard pass from Tajh Boyd (Chandler Catanzaro kick)	Clemson 14–7
1	2:25	Ohio State	Team safety	Clemson 14–9
2	6:16	Clemson	Martavis Bryant 3-yard pass from Tajh Boyd (Chandler Catanzaro kick failed)	Clemson 20–9
2	3:39	Ohio State	Jeff Heuerman 57-yard pass Braxton Miller (Drew Basil kick blocked)	Clemson 20–15
2	0:12	Ohio State	Braxton Miller 3-yard run (Drew Basil kick)	Ohio State 22–20
3	5:50	Ohio State	Carlos Hyde 1-yard run (Drew Basil kick)	Ohio State 29–20
3	2:47	Clemson	Sammy Watkins 30-yard pass from Tajh Boyd (Chandler Catanzaro kick)	Ohio State 29–27
3	0:32	Clemson	Martavis Bryant 3-yard pass from Tajh Boyd (Chandler Catanzaro kick)	Clemson 34–29
4	11:35	Ohio State	Carlos Hyde 14-yard pass from Braxton Miller (Kenny Guiton pass failed)	Ohio State 35–34
4	6:16	Clemson	Stanton Seckinger 5-yard pass from Tajh Boyd (Sammy Watkins pass failed)	Clemson 40–35

Ohio State was selected to play in the Orange Bowl on December 8 as a BCS at-large team. Ohio State faced the Clemson Tigers of the Atlantic Coast Conference, who defeated the Buckeyes 40–35. Clemson would open the game with a 6-play drive that resulted in a 48-yard touchdown run from Tajh Boyd. The Buckeyes' responded on their first offensive possession, driving 75 yards and tying the game on a Braxton Miller touchdown run. A 34-yard touchdown pass from Boyd to Sammy Watkins on Clemson's next possession gave the Tigers' a 14–7 lead. After the Buckeyes' special teams pinned Clemson within one yard of their endzone, the Ohio State defense forced an intentional grounding penalty in endzone, resulting in a safety, cutting the Clemson lead to 14–9 at the end of the first quarter.

The Tigers' would extend their lead midway through the second quarter on a touchdown pass from Tajh Boyd to Martavis Bryant, giving Clemson a 20–9 lead. Ohio State responded on their next possession, with a 5-play drive, resulting in a touchdown pass from Braxton Miller to Jeff Heuerman. A Miller 3-yard touchdown run at the end of the half gave the Buckeyes' their first lead at 22–20 going into halftime. Carlos Hyde scored his first touchdown of the game early in the third quarter, extending the Ohio State lead to 29–20. Clemson's next offensive drive would be extended after a fumbled punt and would result in the Tigers' scoring on a touchdown pass from Boyd to Sammy Watkins. Clemson would retake the lead later on their next offensive possession on Bryant's second touchdown reception, giving the Tigers' a 34–29 lead at the end of the third quarter.

Ohio State's completed a 10-play, 75-yard drive early in the fourth quarter, which resulted in a 14-yard touchdown pass from Braxton Miller to Carlos Hyde. The touchdown gave the Buckeyes' the lead again at 35–34, following a failed two-point conversion pass from Kenny Guiton. Clemson would put together a 13-play drive on their next possession, and take the lead for the final time after a Stanton Seckinger touchdown reception, though they were unable to complete the two-point conversion. Miller would fumble the ball at midfield on the Buckeyes' next possession, though Ohio State would force a Boyd interception, with a Miller interception two plays later sealed the 40–35 Clemson victory. The loss brought Ohio State's all-time record against the Tigers to 0–2.

== Rankings ==
Entering the 2013 season, the Buckeyes' were ranked No. 2 in both the AP Preseason Poll and Coaches' Preseason Poll. Following their 40–20 victory over Buffalo in the first week, the Buckeyes' dropped to No. 3 in the AP Poll, being jumped by the Oregon Ducks. After defeated San Diego State 42–7 in the second week of the season, Ohio State would drop again, falling to No. 3 in the Coaches' Poll and No. 4 in the AP Poll, behind the Clemson Tigers. Ohio State was No. 4 when the first Harris Interactive Poll was released on October 13. The Buckeyes also debuted at No. 4 in first BCS standings of the season on October 20. The Buckeyes' would also drop to No. 4 in the Coaches' Poll on October 20, behind the Florida State Seminoles. Following the Oregon Ducks' loss to the Stanford Cardinal on November 7, Ohio State moved up to No. 3 in all four polls. The Buckeyes would drop to No. 4 in the AP Poll the following week, behind the Baylor Bears. Following losses by Baylor and the No. 1 Alabama Crimson Tide, Ohio State jumped to No. 2 in all four polls on December 1. After the Buckeyes' loss to Michigan State in the Big Ten Championship Game, they fell to No. 7 in the AP Poll, Harris Interactive Poll, and the BCS standings, while falling to No. 6 in the Coaches' Poll. After their loss to Clemson in the Orange Bowl, Ohio State was ranked No. 10 in the final Coaches' Poll and No. 12 in the final AP Poll.

Ranking movements Legend: ██ Increase in ranking ██ Decrease in ranking ( ) = First-place votes
	Week																
Poll	Pre	1	2	3	4	5	6	7	8	9	10	11	12	13	14	15	Final
AP	2 (1)	3 (1)	4 (1)	4	4	4	4	4	4	4	4	3	4	3	2	7	12
Coaches	2 (3)	2 (3)	3 (2)	3	3	3	3	3	4	4	4	3	3	3	2 (4)	6	10
Harris	Not released							4	4	4	4	3	3	3	2 (5)	7	Not released
BCS	Not released								4	4	4	3	3	3	2	7	Not released

== After the season ==
=== Final statistics ===
Following their loss to Clemson, Ohio State's final team statistics were released. On the offensive side of the ball, Ohio State ranked seventh in total offense (511.9 yards per game), fifth in rushing offense (308.6 yards per game), 88th in passing offense (203.3 yards per game), and third in scoring offense (45.5 points per game). On the defensive side of the ball, Ohio State ranked 46th in total defense (377.4 yards per game), ninth in rushing defense (109.4 yards per game), 110th in passing defense (268 yards per game), and 28th in scoring defense (22.6 points per game). In conference, Ohio State ranked third in rushing defense and 11th in passing defense.

Individually, Carlos Hyde led the team in rushing with 1,521 total yards (138.27 yards per game), scoring 15 rushing touchdowns, and ranking fifth nationally in rushing yards per game. Braxton Miller finished the season completing 162 of 255 pass attempts, with 2,094 passing yards, 24 touchdown passes and seven interceptions. Miller also complied 1,068 rushing yards on 171 attempts, with 12 rushing touchdowns. Ryan Shazier led the team with 143 total tackles and 101 solo tackles. C.J. Barnett led the team with four interceptions.

=== Awards ===
After the Big Ten Championship Game, multiple Ohio State players were recognized for their on-field performance with a variety of awards and recognitions. The Big Ten recognized several players for their individual performances with various awards. On December 2, Braxton Miller was named the Graham-George Offensive Player of the Year, in addition to being named the Griese-Brees Quarterback of the Year for the second consecutive season. Carlos Hyde was named the Ameche-Dayne Running Back of the Year. Miller, Hyde, Corey Linsley, Ryan Shazier and Bradley Roby were named to the Coaches' All-Big Ten First Team. Corey Brown, Andrew Norwell, Jack Mewhort, Michael Bennett and Noah Spence were named to the Coaches' All-Big Ten Second Team. Miller, Hyde, Linsley, Norwell Mewhort, Spence, Shazier and Roby were named to the Media All-Big Ten First Team, while Bennett was named to the Media All-Big Ten Second Team.

In addition to the conference awards, several players were also named to various All-American Teams. Ryan Shazier was named to the Associated Press All-American First Team, while Carlos Hyde and Jack Mewhort were named to the Associated Press All-American Second Team. Mewhort and Shazier were also named to the ESPN All-American Team. Mewhort was also named a Walter Camp All-American and Shaizer was named as a USA Today All-American. Joey Bosa was named a Freshman All-American by The Sporting News and College Football News.

=== Coaching changes ===
On December 21, co-defensive coordinator Everett Withers accepted the head coaching position at James Madison. On January 10, defensive line coach Mike Vrabel accepted a position as linebackers coach for the Houston Texans. On January 15, Larry Johnson was brought onto the Ohio State staff as the defensive line and assistant head coach. Johnson spent 18 years at Penn State prior to joining the Ohio State staff. On January 23, Ohio State announced the hiring of Chris Ash to replace Withers as co-defensive coordinator, along with being named the safeties coach.

=== NFL draft ===
Fourteen players from Ohio State entered into the NFL Draft, twelve seniors and two juniors. On defense, Bradley Roby, Christian Bryant and C.J. Barnett all entered. On offense, Carlos Hyde, Jack Mewhort, Corey Linsley, Andrew Norwell, Corey Brown, Kenny Guiton, Jordan Hall, Marcus Hall and Chris Fields entered, while George Makridis entered on special teams. Shazier, a junior, announced his intention to enter the draft on January 6, and is projected to go in the first round. Roby, a redshirt junior, announced his intention to enter the draft in November, and is expected to go in the second round. Shazier was selected with the fifteen pick in the first round by the Pittsburgh Steelers, while Roby was selected with the thirty-first pick in the first round by the Denver Broncos. Mewhort was taken by the Indianapolis Colts and Hyde was taken by the San Francisco 49ers in the second round. Linsley was taken in the fifth round by the Green Bay Packers and Bryant was taken in the seven round by the St. Louis Rams.
