= Jack Mewhort =

American football player (born 1991)

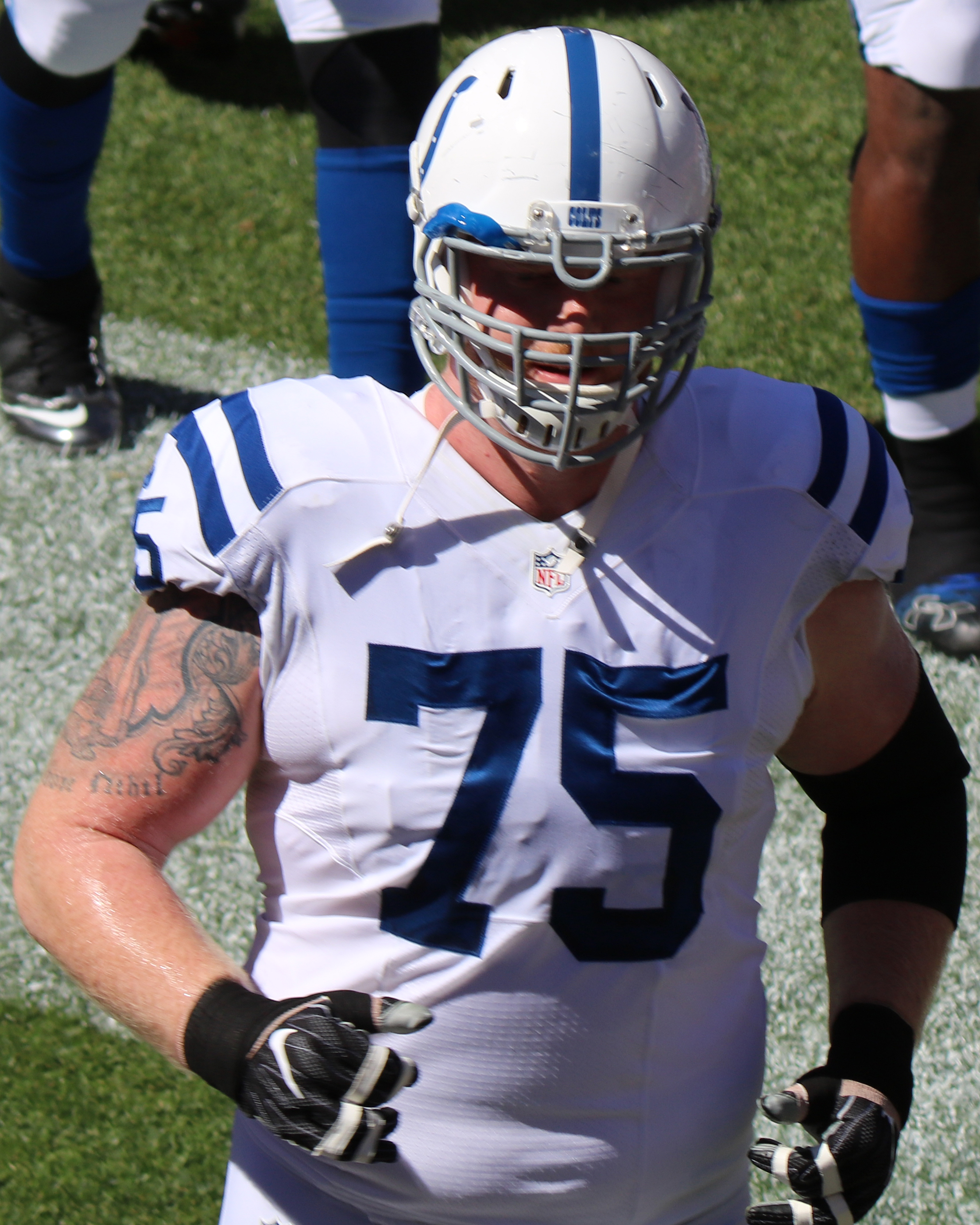
- Mewhort with the Indianapolis Colts in 2016

No. 75
- Position: Offensive guard

Personal information
- Born: August 30, 1991 (age 35); Toledo, Ohio, U.S.
- Listed height: 6 ft 6 in (1.98 m)
- Listed weight: 305 lb (138 kg)

Career information
- High school: St. John's Jesuit (Toledo)
- College: Ohio State (2009–2013)
- NFL draft: 2014: 2nd round, 59th overall pick

Career history
- Indianapolis Colts (2014–2017)

Awards and highlights
- First-team All-American (2013); First-team All-Big Ten (2013); Second-Team All Big Ten (2012)

Career NFL statistics
- Games played: 45
- Games started: 45
- Stats at Pro Football Reference

Jack Donald Mewhort (born August 30, 1991) is an American former professional football player who was a guard for four seasons for Indianapolis Colts of the National Football League (NFL). He played college football for the Ohio State Buckeyes and was selected by the Colts in the second round of the 2014 NFL draft.

== Early life ==
Mewhort was born on August 30, 1991, in Toledo, Ohio, to Gail (née Schlossman) and Donald Mewhort III. His father is a lawyer and businessman who captained the Wittenberg University basketball team in the late 1980s and was a former president of the Inverness Club in 2019. Mewhort's paternal grandfather, Buzz Mewhort, played basketball at Duke University in the 1960 ACC championship team and later co-captained the team between 1961 and 1962. Mewhort's mother's family has an architectural and artistic background: his great-grandfather Norman Schlossman was a founding partner of Loebl Schlossman & Hackl and was involved in the recruitment of Pablo Picasso to design and donate the eponymous sculpture in Daley Plaza, Chicago.

Like his father, Mewhort attended St. John's Jesuit High School where in 2009 he was ranked the 212th overall recruiting prospect and the second best center in the nation. He was a member of the U.S. team that won the 2009 IFAF Junior World Championship and played in the Under Armour All-America Game the same year. Mewhort received scholarship offers from Michigan State, Bowling Green, Northwestern, and Toledo, committing to Ohio State on December 29, 2007.

== College career ==
Mewhort played under coaches Jim Tressel and Urban Meyer for the Ohio State Buckeyes from 2009 to 2013. He was redshirted his freshman year, and played in 10 games the following year as a backup. Mewhort played at right and left guard early in his college career before becoming a 13-game starter at left-tackle in 2013. Mewhort was selected by Urban Meyer to be co-captain of the Buckeyes as a fifth-year senior. As a senior in 2013, Mewhort was named an All-American by ESPN.

=== Awards and honors ===
- First-team All-American (2013)
- First-team All-Big Ten (2013)
- Second-Team All Big Ten (2012)

== Professional career ==
Pre-draft measurables
Height	Weight	Arm length	Hand span	Bench press
6 ft 6 in (1.98 m)	309 lb (140 kg)	34 in (0.86 m)	9 3/4 in (0.25 m)	28 reps
All values from NFL Combine

During the 2014 NFL draft, Mewhort was selected in the 2nd round, 59 overall, by the Indianapolis Colts. Mewhort started 14 games in his rookie season, and all 16 games of the 2015 season. During the 2016 preseason, Mewhort suffered a knee injury and was expected to miss 2–4 weeks recovering. He started 10 games in 2016 before being placed on injured reserve on December 12, 2016.

In 2017, Mewhort started the first five games at right guard before suffering a knee injury. He was placed on injured reserve on October 14, 2017.

On March 21, 2018, Mewhort re-signed with the Colts.

On August 1, 2018, Mewhort announced his retirement from the NFL after four seasons with the Colts. He cited his knee problems as one of the reasons for his retirement.

== Personal life ==
Mewhort graduated from Ohio State University with a BSc in Consumer and Family Financial Services in 2014. He completed his MBA at the Kelley School of Business, Indiana University in 2023 through a National Football League Players Association program whilst working in real estate in Ohio. Mewhort is a game analyst for University of Toledo Rockets football radio broadcasts.
