= 2013 Clemson Tigers football team =

American college football season

2013 Clemson Tigers football

Orange Bowl champion

Orange Bowl, W 40–35 vs. Ohio State
- Conference: Atlantic Coast Conference
- Atlantic Division

Ranking
- Coaches: No. 7
- AP: No. 8
- Record: 11–2 (7–1 ACC)
- Head coach: Dabo Swinney (5th full, 6th overall season)
- Offensive coordinator: Chad Morris (3rd season)
- Offensive scheme: Spread
- Defensive coordinator: Brent Venables (2nd season)
- Base defense: 4–3
- Home stadium: Memorial Stadium

2013 Atlantic Coast Conference football standings
| | Conf. | | | Overall |
| Team | W | | L | W | | L |
|---|---|---|---|---|---|---|
Atlantic Division
| No. 1 Florida State x$# | 8 | – | 0 | 14 | – | 0 |
| No. 8 Clemson % | 7 | – | 1 | 11 | – | 2 |
| Boston College | 4 | – | 4 | 7 | – | 6 |
| Syracuse | 4 | – | 4 | 7 | – | 6 |
| Maryland | 3 | – | 5 | 7 | – | 6 |
| Wake Forest | 2 | – | 6 | 4 | – | 8 |
| NC State | 0 | – | 8 | 3 | – | 9 |
Coastal Division
| No. 23 Duke x | 6 | – | 2 | 10 | – | 4 |
| Miami (FL) | 5 | – | 3 | 9 | – | 4 |
| Virginia Tech | 5 | – | 3 | 8 | – | 5 |
| Georgia Tech | 5 | – | 3 | 7 | – | 6 |
| North Carolina | 4 | – | 4 | 7 | – | 6 |
| Pittsburgh | 3 | – | 5 | 7 | – | 6 |
| Virginia | 0 | – | 8 | 2 | – | 10 |
Championship: Florida State 45, Duke 7
# – BCS National Champion; $ – BCS representative as conference champion; % – BCS at-large representative; x – Division champion/co-champions; Rankings from AP Poll

The 2013 Clemson Tigers football team represented Clemson University in the 2013 NCAA Division I FBS football season. The Tigers were led by head coach Dabo Swinney in his fifth full year and sixth overall since taking over midway through the 2008 season. They played their home games at Memorial Stadium, also known as "Death Valley". They were members of the Atlantic Division of the Atlantic Coast Conference. They finished the season 11–2, 7–1 in ACC play to finish in second place in the Atlantic Division. They were invited to the Orange Bowl where they defeated Ohio State.

== Personnel ==
=== Coaching staff ===
| Name | Position | Seasons at Clemson | Alma mater |
|---|---|---|---|
| Dabo Swinney | Head coach | 6 | Alabama (1992) |
| Chad Morris | Offensive coordinator/quarterbacks | 2 | Texas A&M (1992) |
| Brent Venables | Defensive coordinator/linebackers | 1 | Kansas State (1992) |
| Tony Elliott | Running Backs | 2 | Clemson (2003) |
| Jeff Scott | Wide Receivers/recruiting coordinator | 4 | Clemson (2002) |
| Robbie Caldwell | Offensive line | 2 | Furman (1976) |
| Dan Brooks | Defensive tackles | 3 | Western Carolina (1976) |
| Marion Hobby | Defensive Running game coordinator/Defensive Ends | 2 | Tennessee (1989) |
| Michael Reed | Defensive Backs | 0 | Boston College (1994) |
| Danny Pearman | Special Teams coordinator/Tight Ends | 4 | Clemson (1995) |
| Zac Alley | Student Assistant | 3 | Clemson (2014) |

== Schedule ==
| Date | Time | Opponent | Rank | Site | TV | Result | Attendance |
|---|---|---|---|---|---|---|---|
| August 31 | 8:00 p.m. | No. 5 Georgia* | No. 8 | Memorial Stadium; Clemson, SC (rivalry) (College GameDay) | ABC | W 38–35 | 83,830 |
| September 7 | 12:30 p.m. | South Carolina State* | No. 4 | Memorial Stadium; Clemson, SC | ACCRN | W 52–13 | 81,428 |
| September 19 | 7:30 p.m. | at NC State | No. 3 | Carter–Finley Stadium; Raleigh, NC (Textile Bowl) | ESPN | W 26–14 | 57,583 |
| September 28 | 3:30 p.m. | Wake Forest | No. 3 | Memorial Stadium; Clemson, SC | ESPNU | W 56–7 | 80,607 |
| October 5 | 3:30 p.m. | at Syracuse | No. 3 | Carrier Dome; Syracuse, NY | ABC/ESPN2 | W 49–14 | 48,961 |
| October 12 | 3:30 p.m. | Boston College | No. 3 | Memorial Stadium; Clemson, SC (Battle for the O'Rourke–McFadden Trophy) | ABC/ESPN2 | W 24–14 | 77,506 |
| October 19 | 8:00 p.m. | No. 5 Florida State | No. 3 | Memorial Stadium; Clemson, SC (rivalry) (College GameDay) | ABC | L 14–51 | 83,428 |
| October 26 | 3:30 p.m. | at Maryland | No. 9 | Byrd Stadium; College Park, MD | ESPN | W 40–27 | 48,134 |
| November 2 | 3:30 p.m. | at Virginia | No. 9 | Scott Stadium; Charlottesville, VA | ESPN | W 59–10 | 46,959 |
| November 14 | 7:30 p.m. | Georgia Tech | No. 8 | Memorial Stadium; Clemson, SC (rivalry) | ESPN | W 55–31 | 75,324 |
| November 23 | Noon | The Citadel* | No. 7 | Memorial Stadium; Clemson, SC | ESPN3 | W 52–6 | 81,554 |
| November 30 | 7:00 p.m. | at No. 10 South Carolina* | No. 6 | Williams-Brice Stadium; Columbia, SC (Palmetto Bowl) | ESPN2 | L 17–31 | 84,174 |
| January 3, 2014 | 7:30 p.m. | vs. No. 7 Ohio State* | No. 12 | Sun Life Stadium; Miami Gardens, FL (Orange Bowl) | ESPN | W 40–35 | 72,080 |
*Non-conference game; Rankings from AP Poll released prior to the game; All times are in Eastern time

== Depth chart ==
Defense

FS
Jayron Kearse
Jadar Johnson

| WLB | MLB | SLB |
|---|---|---|
| ⋅ | Stephone Anthony | ⋅ |
| TJ Burrell | Ben Boulware | ⋅ |

SS
Robert Smith
Korrin Wiggins

CB
Bashaud Breeland
Martin Jenkins

| DE | DT | DT | DE |
|---|---|---|---|
| Corey Crawford | Grady Jarrett | DeShawn Williams | Vic Beasley |
| Tavaris Barnes | D. J. Reader | Josh Watson | Shaq Lawson |

CB
Darius Robinson
Garry Peters

Offense

WR
Adam Humphries
Germone Hopper

WR
Martavis Bryant
Mike Williams

| LT | LG | C | RG | RT |
|---|---|---|---|---|
| Brandon Thomas | David Beasley | Ryan Norton | Tyler Shatley | Isaiah Battle |
| Gifford Timothy | Kalon Davis | Jay Guillermo | Reid Webster | Shaq Anthony |

TE
Stanton Seckinger
Sam Cooper

WR
Sammy Watkins
T. J. Green

QB
Tajh Boyd
Cole Stoudt

Key reserves

Special teams
PK Chandler Catanzaro
P Bradley Pinion
KR Sammy Watkins
PR Adam Humphries
LS Michael Sobeski
H Corbin Jenkins

RB
Roderick McDowell
DJ Howard

=== Recruiting class ===
College recruiting (2013)
| Name | Hometown | School | Height | Weight | Commit date |
|---|---|---|---|---|---|
| Mackensie Alexander; CB | Immokalee, Florida | Immokalee H.S. | 5 ft 10 in (1.78 m) | 180 lb (82 kg) | |
| Mackensie Alexander; CB | Recruit ratings: Scout: Rivals: 247Sports: ESPN: | | | | |
| Dorian O'Daniel; LB | Olney, Maryland | Good Counsel | 6 ft 1 in (1.85 m) | 205 lb (93 kg) | |
| Dorian O'Daniel; LB | Recruit ratings: Scout: Rivals: 247Sports: ESPN: | | | | |
| Tyrone Crowder; OL | Rockingham, North Carolina | Richmond | 6 ft 1 in (1.85 m) | 330 lb (150 kg) | |
| Tyrone Crowder; OL | Recruit ratings: Scout: Rivals: 247Sports: ESPN: | | | | |
| Tyshon Dye; RB | Elberton, Georgia | Elbert County | 6 ft 0 in (1.83 m) | 208 lb (94 kg) | |
| Tyshon Dye; RB | Recruit ratings: Scout: Rivals: 247Sports: ESPN: | | | | |
| Ben Boulware; LB | Anderson, South Carolina | TL Hanna | 6 ft 0 in (1.83 m) | 230 lb (100 kg) | |
| Ben Boulware; LB | Recruit ratings: Scout: Rivals: 247Sports: ESPN: | | | | |
| Jayron Kearse; ATH | Fort Myers, Florida | South Fort Myers | 6 ft 4 in (1.93 m) | 185 lb (84 kg) | |
| Jayron Kearse; ATH | Recruit ratings: Scout: Rivals: 247Sports: ESPN: | | | | |
| Mike Williams; WR | Santee, South Carolina | Lake Marion | 6 ft 4 in (1.93 m) | 210 lb (95 kg) | |
| Mike Williams; WR | Recruit ratings: Scout: Rivals: 247Sports: ESPN: | | | | |
| Scott Pagano; DT | Honolulu, Hawaii | Moanalua | 6 ft 3 in (1.91 m) | 280 lb (130 kg) | |
| Scott Pagano; DT | Recruit ratings: Scout: Rivals: 247Sports: ESPN: | | | | |
| Ebenezer Ogundenko; DE | Brooklyn, New York | Jefferson H.S. | 6 ft 4 in (1.93 m) | 238 lb (108 kg) | |
| Ebenezer Ogundenko; DE | Recruit ratings: Scout: Rivals: 247Sports: ESPN: | | | | |
| Wayne Gallman; LB | Loganville, Georgia | Grayson | 6 ft 1 in (1.85 m) | 195 lb (88 kg) | |
| Wayne Gallman; LB | Recruit ratings: Scout: Rivals: 247Sports: ESPN: | | | | |
| Adrian Baker; CB | Hollywood, Florida | Chaminade-Madonna Prep | 6 ft 1 in (1.85 m) | 163 lb (74 kg) | |
| Adrian Baker; CB | Recruit ratings: Scout: Rivals: 247Sports: ESPN: | | | | |
| Jordan Leggett; TE | Navarre, Florida | Navarre H.S. | 6 ft 5 in (1.96 m) | 205 lb (93 kg) | |
| Jordan Leggett; TE | Recruit ratings: Scout: Rivals: 247Sports: ESPN: | | | | |
| Dane Rogers; DE | Shelby, North Carolina | Crest H.S. | 6 ft 3 in (1.91 m) | 230 lb (100 kg) | |
| Dane Rogers; DE | Recruit ratings: Scout: Rivals: 247Sports: ESPN: | | | | |
| Korrin Wiggins; S | Durham, North Carolina | Hillside H.S. | 6 ft 1 in (1.85 m) | 190 lb (86 kg) | |
| Korrin Wiggins; S | Recruit ratings: Scout: Rivals: 247Sports: ESPN: | | | | |
| Maverick Morris; OL | Douglas, Georgia | Coffee H.S. | 6 ft 4 in (1.93 m) | 280 lb (130 kg) | |
| Maverick Morris; OL | Recruit ratings: Scout: Rivals: 247Sports: ESPN: | | | | |
| Jadar Johnson; S | Orangeburg, South Carolina | Orangeburg-Wilkinson | 6 ft 1 in (1.85 m) | 188 lb (85 kg) | |
| Jadar Johnson; S | Recruit ratings: Scout: Rivals: 247Sports: ESPN: | | | | |
| T. J. Green; ATH | Sylacauga, Alabama | Sylacauga H.S. | 6 ft 2 in (1.88 m) | 189 lb (86 kg) | |
| T. J. Green; ATH | Recruit ratings: Scout: Rivals: 247Sports: ESPN: | | | | |
| Marcus Edmond; ATH | Hopkins, South Carolina | Lower Richland | 6 ft 0 in (1.83 m) | 165 lb (75 kg) | |
| Marcus Edmond; ATH | Recruit ratings: Scout: Rivals: 247Sports: ESPN: | | | | |
| DJ Greenlee; LB | Central, South Carolina | D.W. Daniel | 6 ft 3 in (1.91 m) | 205 lb (93 kg) | |
| DJ Greenlee; LB | Recruit ratings: Scout: Rivals: 247Sports: ESPN: | | | | |
| Ryan Carter; CB | Loganville, Georgia | Grayson | 5 ft 10 in (1.78 m) | 175 lb (79 kg) | |
| Ryan Carter; CB | Recruit ratings: Scout: Rivals: 247Sports: ESPN: | | | | |
Overall recruit ranking: Scout: 12 Rivals: 14 247Sports: 15 ESPN: 13
‡ Refers to 40-yard dash; Note: In many cases, Scout, Rivals, 247Sports, On3, and ESPN may conflict in their listings of height, weight and 40 time.; In these cases, the average was taken. ESPN grades are on a 100-point scale.; Sources: "2013 Team Ranking". Rivals.com.

== Game summaries ==
=== Georgia ===
| | 1 | 2 | 3 | 4 | Total |
|---|---|---|---|---|---|
| #5 Bulldogs | 14 | 7 | 7 | 7 | 35 |
| #8 Tigers | 14 | 7 | 10 | 7 | 38 |

=== South Carolina State ===
| | 1 | 2 | 3 | 4 | Total |
|---|---|---|---|---|---|
| Bulldogs | 0 | 7 | 0 | 6 | 13 |
| #4 Tigers | 17 | 21 | 7 | 7 | 52 |

=== NC State ===
| | 1 | 2 | 3 | 4 | Total |
|---|---|---|---|---|---|
| #3 Tigers | 3 | 10 | 7 | 6 | 26 |
| Wolfpack | 0 | 7 | 0 | 7 | 14 |

=== Wake Forest ===
| | 1 | 2 | 3 | 4 | Total |
|---|---|---|---|---|---|
| Demon Deacons | 7 | 0 | 0 | 0 | 7 |
| #3 Tigers | 21 | 14 | 14 | 7 | 56 |

=== Syracuse ===
| | 1 | 2 | 3 | 4 | Total |
|---|---|---|---|---|---|
| #3 Tigers | 21 | 14 | 7 | 7 | 49 |
| Orange | 0 | 7 | 7 | 0 | 14 |

=== Boston College ===
| | 1 | 2 | 3 | 4 | Total |
|---|---|---|---|---|---|
| Eagles | 0 | 7 | 7 | 0 | 14 |
| #3 Tigers | 0 | 3 | 7 | 14 | 24 |

=== Florida State ===
| | 1 | 2 | 3 | 4 | Total |
|---|---|---|---|---|---|
| #5 Seminoles | 17 | 10 | 14 | 10 | 51 |
| #3 Tigers | 7 | 0 | 0 | 7 | 14 |

=== Maryland ===
| | 1 | 2 | 3 | 4 | Total |
|---|---|---|---|---|---|
| #9 Tigers | 6 | 10 | 3 | 21 | 40 |
| Terrapins | 7 | 0 | 6 | 14 | 27 |

=== Virginia ===
| | 1 | 2 | 3 | 4 | Total |
|---|---|---|---|---|---|
| #8 Tigers | 14 | 21 | 7 | 17 | 59 |
| Cavaliers | 7 | 0 | 3 | 0 | 10 |

=== Georgia Tech ===
| | 1 | 2 | 3 | 4 | Total |
|---|---|---|---|---|---|
| Yellow Jackets | 0 | 10 | 14 | 7 | 31 |
| #6 Tigers | 6 | 21 | 14 | 14 | 55 |

=== The Citadel ===
| | 1 | 2 | 3 | 4 | Total |
|---|---|---|---|---|---|
| Bulldogs | 0 | 0 | 3 | 3 | 6 |
| #6 Tigers | 14 | 28 | 3 | 7 | 52 |

=== South Carolina ===
| | 1 | 2 | 3 | 4 | Total |
|---|---|---|---|---|---|
| #6 Tigers | 7 | 3 | 7 | 0 | 17 |
| #10 Gamecocks | 7 | 10 | 0 | 14 | 31 |

=== Ohio State (Orange Bowl) ===
| | 1 | 2 | 3 | 4 | Total |
|---|---|---|---|---|---|
| #12 Tigers | 14 | 6 | 14 | 6 | 40 |
| #7 Buckeyes | 9 | 13 | 7 | 6 | 35 |

== Rankings ==
Ranking movements Legend: ██ Increase in ranking ██ Decrease in ranking
| | Week | | | | | | | | | | | | | | | | |
| Poll | Pre | 1 | 2 | 3 | 4 | 5 | 6 | 7 | 8 | 9 | 10 | 11 | 12 | 13 | 14 | 15 | Final |
|---|---|---|---|---|---|---|---|---|---|---|---|---|---|---|---|---|---|
| AP | 8 | 4 | 3 | 3 | 3 | 3 | 3 | 3 | 9 | 9 | 8 | 8 | 7 | 6 | 13 | 12 | 8 |
| Coaches | 8 | 5 | 5 | 4 | 4 | 4 | 4 | 4 | 10 | 8 | 7 | 6 | 6 | 4 | 11 | 11 | 7 |
| Harris | Not released | | | | | | | 3 | 10 | 8 | 7 | 7 | 6 | 4 | 11 | 11 | Not released |
| BCS | Not released | | | | | | | | 9 | 8 | 7 | 8 | 7 | 6 | 13 | 12 | Not released |

== 2014 NFL draft ==
Clemson had five players selected in the 2014 NFL draft. Sammy Watkins went in the first round as the fourth overall pick, tied for the highest NFL draft pick in Clemson football history.

| Player | Team | Round | Pick # | Position |
|---|---|---|---|---|
| Sammy Watkins | Buffalo Bills | 1st | 4th | WR |
| Brandon Thomas | San Francisco 49ers | 3rd | 100th | OL |
| Bashaud Breeland | Washington Redskins | 4th | 102nd | DB |
| Martavis Bryant | Pittsburgh Steelers | 4th | 118th | WR |
| Tajh Boyd | New York Jets | 6th | 213th | QB |

=== Undrafted signees ===
Along with the five draft picks, Clemson had four more players make the NFL as undrafted free agents.

| Player | Team | Position |
|---|---|---|
| Chandler Catanzaro | Arizona Cardinals | PK |
| Tyler Shatley | Jacksonville Jaguars | OG |
| Spencer Shuey | Jacksonville Jaguars | LB |
| Darius Robinson | Buffalo Bills | CB |
