= Hubbard Exempted Village School District =

Location
- 108 Orchard Ave; Hubbard, Ohio 44425; United States

Information
- Type: Public
- Established: 1873
- NCES District ID: 3904542
- Teaching staff: 118.11 (FTE)
- Grades: K-12
- Enrollment: 1,739 (2024-25)
- Student to teacher ratio: 14.72
- Colors: Blue and white
- Team name: Eagles
- Accreditation: Ohio Department of Education
- Website: www.hubbard.k12.oh.us/o/hhs

The Hubbard Exempted Village School District is a school district located in Hubbard, Trumbull County, Ohio, United States. The school serves one high school, one middle school and one elementary school.

== History ==
The Hubbard Exempted Village began in 1873, it was incorporated into the township or "union" school. In 1920, HHS moved to a new building on Orchard Street SE, which served as home of HHS until 1954 and later served as Roosevelt Elementary School until 2011.

Hubbard High School moved to its current campus on Hall Avenue SE in 1954 with the completion of a new building. An elementary building opened on the campus in 1960, and this building became Reed Middle School in 1970, followed by construction of the Hubbard Community Pool, which opened in 1975.

The current high school building opened in 2010 and was the first phase of a multi-year $55 million project to bring all grades to the same campus and be in a single K–12 building, while also incorporating the existing pool. After the current HHS opened, the 1954 building was razed, though the auditorium was retained and incorporated into the new building. Hubbard Elementary followed in 2011, and Hubbard Middle School, built on the site of the 1954 HHS building, opened in 2013, connecting the high school and elementary school. The Reed Middle School building was razed after the completion of the new middle school, and the site was used for a new softball field and parking.

== Schools ==
=== High School ===
- Hubbard High School

=== Middle School ===
- Hubbard Middle School

=== Elementary School ===
- Hubbard Elementary

=== Former Schools ===
- Roosevelt School
- The Ridge School
- Reed School
