= 2013 All-Big Ten Conference football team =

American college football all-star team

The 2013 All-Big Ten Conference football team consists of American football players chosen as All-Big Ten Conference players for the 2013 Big Ten Conference football season. The conference recognizes two official All-Big Ten selectors: (1) the Big Ten conference coaches selected separate offensive and defensive units and named first- and second-team players (the "Coaches" team); and (2) a panel of sports writers and broadcasters covering the Big Ten also selected offensive and defensive units and named first- and second-team players (the "Media" team). Only one Big Ten player, Darqueze Dennard of Michigan State, was also selected as a consensus first-team player on the 2013 College Football All-America Team

== Offensive selections ==
=== Quarterbacks ===
- Braxton Miller, Ohio State (Coaches-1; Media-1)
- Connor Cook, Michigan State (Coaches-2)
- Nathan Scheelhaase, Illinois (Media-2)

=== Running backs ===
- Ameer Abdullah, Nebraska (Coaches-1; Media-1)
- Carlos Hyde, Ohio State (Coaches-1; Media-1)
- Melvin Gordon, Wisconsin (Coaches-2; Media-2)
- James White, Wisconsin (Coaches-2; Media-2)

=== Receivers ===
- Jared Abbrederis, Wisconsin (Coaches-1; Media-1)
- Allen Robinson, Penn State (Coaches-1; Media-1)
- Jeremy Gallon, Michigan (Coaches-2; Media-2)
- Corey Brown, Ohio State (Coaches-2)
- Cody Latimer, Indiana (Media-2)

=== Centers ===
- Corey Linsley, Ohio State (Coaches-1; Media-1)
- Cole Pensick, Nebraska (Coaches-2)
- Jack Allen, Michigan State (Media-2)

=== Guards ===
- John Urschel, Penn State (Coaches-1; Media-1)
- Ryan Groy, Wisconsin (Coaches-1; Media-2)
- Andrew Norwell, Ohio State (Coaches-2; Media-1)
- Blake Treadwell, Michigan State (Coaches-2; Media-2)

=== Tackles ===
- Taylor Lewan, Michigan (Coaches-1; Media-1)
- Brandon Scherff, Iowa (Coaches-1; Media-2)
- Jack Mewhort, Ohio State (Coaches-2; Media-1)
- Brett Van Sloten, Iowa (Coaches-2)
- Rob Havenstein, Wisconsin (Media-2)

=== Tight ends ===
- C. J. Fiedorowicz, Iowa (Coaches-1; Media-2)
- Devin Funchess, Michigan (Coaches-2; Media-1)

== Defensive selections ==
=== Defensive linemen ===
- Shilique Calhoun, Michigan State (Coaches-1; Media-1)
- Ra'Shede Hageman, Minnesota (Coaches-1; Media-1)
- Randy Gregory, Nebraska (Coaches-1; Media-1)
- DaQuan Jones, Penn State (Coaches-1; Media-2)
- Noah Spence, Ohio State (Coaches-2; Media-1)
- Michael Bennett, Ohio State (Coaches-2; Media-2)
- Carl Davis, Iowa (Coaches-2)
- Frank Clark, Michigan (Coaches-2)
- Theiren Cockran, Minnesota (Media-2)
- Tyler Scott, Northwestern (Media-2)

=== Linebackers ===
- Max Bullough, Michigan State (Coaches-1; Media-1)
- Ryan Shazier, Ohio State (Coaches-1; Media-1)
- Chris Borland, Wisconsin (Coaches-1; Media-1)
- James Morris, Iowa (Coaches-2; Media-2)
- Denicos Allen, Michigan State (Coaches-2; Media-2)
- Anthony Hitchens, Iowa (Coaches-2)
- Jonathan Brown, Illinois (Media-2)

=== Defensive backs ===
- Darqueze Dennard, Michigan State (Coaches-1; Media-1)
- Kurtis Drummond, Michigan State (Coaches-1; Media-2)
- Blake Countess, Michigan (Coaches-2; Media-1)
- Bradley Roby, Ohio State (Coaches-2; Media-1)
- Isaiah Lewis, Michigan State (Coaches-1)
- B. J. Lowery, Iowa (Media-1)
- Stanley Jean-Baptiste, Nebraska (Coaches-2; Media-2)
- Ciante Evans, Nebraska (Coaches-2; Media-2)
- Brock Vereen, Minnesota (Coaches-2)
- Ricardo Allen, Purdue (Media-2)

== Special teams ==
=== Kickers ===
- Jeff Budzien, Northwestern (Coaches-1; Media-1)
- Mitch Ewald, Indiana (Coaches-2)
- Mike Meyer, Iowa

=== Punter ===
- Cody Webster, Purdue (Coaches-1 [tie]; Media-1)
- Mike Sadler, Michigan State (Coaches-1 [tie]; Media-2)

== Key ==
Bold = Consensus first-team selection by both the coaches and media

Coaches = Selected by the Big Ten Conference coaches

Media = Selected by the conference media

== See also ==
- 2013 College Football All-America Team
