= Anthony Smith (safety) =

American football player (born 1983)

No. 27, 26, 20, 25
- Position: Safety

Personal information
- Born: September 20, 1983 (age 43); Hubbard, Ohio, U.S.
- Listed height: 6 ft 0 in (1.83 m)
- Listed weight: 200 lb (91 kg)

Career information
- High school: Hubbard
- College: Syracuse
- NFL draft: 2006: 3rd round, 83rd overall pick

Career history
- Pittsburgh Steelers (2006–2008); Green Bay Packers (2009)*; St. Louis Rams (2009); Jacksonville Jaguars (2009–2010); Green Bay Packers (2010); Tennessee Titans (2011)
- * Offseason or practice squad member only

Awards and highlights
- 2× Super Bowl champion (XLIII, XLV); First-team All-Big East (2005); Second-team All-Big East (2004)

Career NFL statistics
- Total tackles: 181
- Forced fumbles: 1
- Fumble recoveries: 2
- Pass deflections: 14
- Interceptions: 7
- Stats at Pro Football Reference

Anthony B. Smith (born September 20, 1983) is an American former professional football player who was a safety for six seasons in the National Football League (NFL). After playing college football for the Syracuse Orange, he was selected by the Pittsburgh Steelers in the third round of the 2006 NFL draft. Smith was also a member of the Green Bay Packers, St. Louis Rams, Jacksonville Jaguars, and Tennessee Titans. He is a two-time Super Bowl champion, with the Steelers in 2008 and the Packers in 2010. Smith retired in 2012.

== Early life ==
Smith attended Hubbard High School in Hubbard, Ohio. He started at safety and running back and wore the number three jersey, earning All-Midwest Region honors by PrepStar and All-Trumbull County Smith had six interceptions both his junior and senior seasons and rushed for 1,787 yards and 29 TDs for an 11–1 team as a senior, and rushed for 1,475 yards and 26 TDs to earn all-state accolades as a junior. Smith also played basketball and baseball, and participated in track, competing in the hurdles, relay events, high jump and long jump.

== College career ==
Smith played college football at Syracuse and finished his Syracuse career ranked third in school history with 14 interceptions. He also set a school record with six blocked kicks, turning two into touchdowns. Played in 46 career games, with 35 starts, recorded 293 tackles and posted 17 pass breakups, three sacks, eight tackles for loss, four forced fumbles and five recoveries, and also returned one of his 14 interceptions for a score.

He had an immediate impact as a freshman, 71 tackles, with 1.5 of them coming for loss. He added a playmaking element as a sophomore, racking up 106 tackles and five picks on the year. Smith earned Second-team All-Big East as a junior after an 85 tackle, three interception season. He finished his career First-team All-Big East, posting 71 tackles, five for loss, three sacks, and a career-high six interceptions. He majored in retail and consumer studies. He was also recruited a running back out of the state of Ohio.

== Professional career ==
=== Pre-draft ===
Pre-draft measurables
Height	Weight	Arm length	Hand span	40-yard dash	10-yard split	20-yard split	20-yard shuttle	Three-cone drill	Vertical jump	Broad jump	Bench press
6 ft 0 1/8 in (1.83 m)	194 lb (88 kg)	31 in (0.79 m)	8 1/2 in (0.22 m)	4.64 s	1.61 s	2.71 s	4.29 s	6.63 s	41.0 in (1.04 m)	10 ft 5 in (3.18 m)	18 reps
All values from NFL Combine/Pro Day

Smith ran a 6.63 3-cone drill at the 2006 Syracuse pro day, which was the 12th best time in that category.

=== Pittsburgh Steelers ===
Smith started his professional career with the Pittsburgh Steelers. During his rookie year, Smith played all 16 games, starting the final four at free safety for injured Ryan Clark. Smith totaled 15 tackles (13 solo) with two interceptions and seven passes defensed and also had 15 tackles on special teams.

During his second year, he had a position battle with Clark for the starting free safety position, but the coaching staff stayed with Clark. However, Smith got his chance when the re-injured Clark went on injured reserve, promoting him to starting safety.

In 2007, Smith became infamous before a game against the undefeated Patriots, when he guaranteed a win. "We're going to win," Smith said. "Yeah, I can guarantee a win. As long as we come out and do what we got to do. Both sides of the ball are rolling, and if our special teams come through for us, we've got a good chance to win." The Steelers lost the game 34–13, with Smith allowing several big plays. After his poor performance, which included a few blown coverages, Smith was benched in favor of Tyrone Carter.

In 2007, he played in all 16 games, starting 10 mostly in place of the injured Clark, for a Steelers defense that was ranked No. 1 in the league. He also started one postseason contest. He finished sixth on the team with 74 tackles and had two interceptions among four passes defensed, and his first career forced fumble and fumble recovery. He also had five tackles on special teams

The following season, 2008, he played in 14 games as a reserve safety and special teamer, recording five tackles (two solo) plus four special teams tackles.

=== Green Bay Packers ===
After the Pittsburgh Steelers failed to tender Smith an offer as a restricted free agent in the 2009 offseason, Smith was signed by the Green Bay Packers on March 9. He was waived by the Packers on September 5, 2009.

=== St. Louis Rams ===
Smith was claimed off waivers by the St. Louis Rams on September 6, 2009. He was waived on November 5.

=== Jacksonville Jaguars ===
Smith was claimed off waivers by the Jacksonville Jaguars on November 6, 2009.

=== Green Bay Packers ===
Smith was traded to the Green Bay Packers October 17, 2010. He was placed on injured reserve on December 18. The Packers, however, went on to win Super Bowl XLV against his former team the Pittsburgh Steelers, making Smith a two-time Super Bowl Champion.

=== Tennessee Titans ===
On August 9, 2011, Smith signed with the Tennessee Titans. After playing in 13 games with zero starts and four tackles in 2011, Smith retired from the NFL in 2012.

== NFL career statistics ==
Legend
**Bold**	Career high

=== Regular season ===
Year	Team	Games		Tackles					Interceptions					Fumbles			
Year	Team	GP	GS	Cmb	Solo	Ast	Sck	TFL	Int	Yds	TD	Lng	PD	FF	FR	Yds	TD
2006	PIT	**16**	4	34	25	9	0.0	0	**2**	40	0	20	**5**	0	0	0	0
2007	PIT	**16**	**10**	**68**	**52**	**16**	0.0	**1**	**2**	**50**	0	**50**	2	**1**	**1**	0	0
2008	PIT	14	0	9	8	1	0.0	0	0	0	0	0	0	0	0	0	0
2009	STL	2	0	4	4	0	0.0	**1**	0	0	0	0	0	0	0	0	0
2009	JAX	8	2	33	27	6	0.0	0	**2**	34	0	30	4	0	**1**	0	0
2010	JAX	3	3	15	13	2	0.0	0	1	47	0	47	1	0	0	0	0
2010	GNB	4	0	7	6	1	0.0	0	0	0	0	0	0	0	0	0	0
2011	TEN	13	0	11	11	0	0.0	0	0	0	0	0	2	0	0	0	0
		76	19	181	146	35	0.0	2	7	171	0	50	14	1	2	0	0

=== Playoffs ===
Year	Team	Games		Tackles					Interceptions					Fumbles			
Year	Team	GP	GS	Cmb	Solo	Ast	Sck	TFL	Int	Yds	TD	Lng	PD	FF	FR	Yds	TD
2007	PIT	**1**	**1**	0	0	0	0.0	0	0	0	0	0	0	0	0	0	0
		1	1	0	0	0	0.0	0	0	0	0	0	0	0	0	0	0
