= 2013 Michigan State Spartans football team =

American college football season

2013 Michigan State Spartans football

Big Ten champion Big Ten Legends Division champion Rose Bowl champion

Big Ten Championship Game, W 34–24 vs. Ohio State

Rose Bowl, W 24–20 vs. Stanford
- Conference: Big Ten Conference
- Legends Division

Ranking
- Coaches: No. 3
- AP: No. 3
- Record: 13–1 (8–0 Big Ten)
- Head coach: Mark Dantonio (7th season)
- Co-offensive coordinators: Dave Warner (1st season); Jim Bollman (1st season)
- Offensive scheme: Pro-style
- Defensive coordinator: Pat Narduzzi (7th season)
- Base defense: 4–3
- Captains: Max Bullough; Darqueze Dennard; Blake Treadwell
- Home stadium: Spartan Stadium

2013 Big Ten Conference football standings
	Conf.			Overall
Team	W		L	W		L
Legends Division
No. 3 Michigan State x$	8	–	0	13	–	1
Iowa	5	–	3	8	–	5
Nebraska	5	–	3	9	–	4
Minnesota	4	–	4	8	–	5
Michigan	3	–	5	7	–	6
Northwestern	1	–	7	5	–	7
Leaders Division
No. 12 Ohio State x%	8	–	0	12	–	2
No. 22 Wisconsin	6	–	2	9	–	4
Penn State*	4	–	4	7	–	5
Indiana	3	–	5	5	–	7
Illinois	1	–	7	4	–	8
Purdue	0	–	8	1	–	11
Championship: Michigan State 34, Ohio State 24
$ – BCS representative as conference champion; % – BCS at-large representative; x – Division champion/co-champions; Penn State ineligible for conference championship game and post-season bowl games due to NCAA sanctions; Rankings from AP Poll

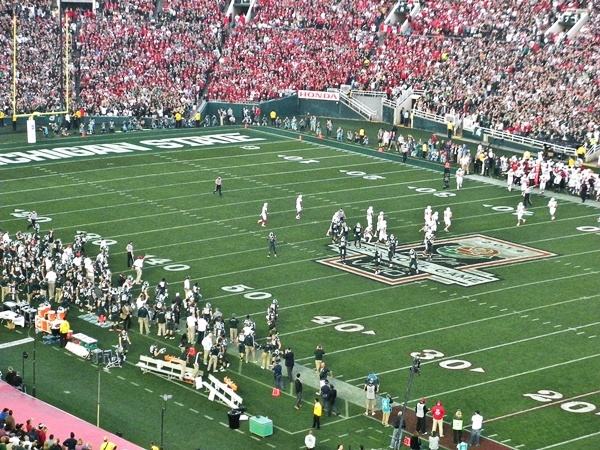
Michigan State defeated Stanford in the Rose Bowl Game on January 1, 2014

The 2013 Michigan State Spartans football team represented Michigan State University in the Legends Division of the Big Ten Conference during the 2013 NCAA Division I FBS football season. Michigan State played their home games at Spartan Stadium in East Lansing, Michigan and were led by seventh year head coach Mark Dantonio. The Spartans finished the year 13–1, 8–0 and undefeated in Big Ten play. By winning the Legends Division, they earned a trip to the Big Ten Championship Game, their second appearance in the championship game. Facing No. 2-ranked Ohio State, they defeated the Buckeyes 34–24, knocking Ohio State out of the running for the BCS National Championship Game. The Spartans received an invitation to the Rose Bowl, their first trip to the Rose Bowl since 1988. There they defeated No. 5-ranked Stanford for the school's first Rose Bowl win since 1988.

== Offseason ==
=== 2013 NFL draft ===
Three members of the 2012 Spartan football team were selected in the 2013 NFL draft

Round	Pick#	Team	Player	Position
2	48	Pittsburgh Steelers	Le'Veon Bell	Running Back
4	106	Miami Dolphins	Dion Sims	Tight End
4	126	Tampa Bay Buccaneers	William Gholston	Defensive End

In addition, five other former Spartans were taken as undrafted free agents:

Team	Player	Position
Houston Texans	Johnny Adams	Cornerback
Oakland Raiders	Larry Caper	Running Back
New England Patriots	Chris McDonald	Guard
Pittsburgh Steelers	Anthony Rashad White	Nose Tackle
Oakland Raiders	Mitchell White	Cornerback

Michigan State remained one of only seven teams to have had a player selected in each draft since the AFL/NFL merger.

=== Transfers out ===
- Juwan Caesar, Wide Receiver
- Jeremy Gainer, Defensive End, graduated and moved to Central Michigan University.
- Jay Harris, Wide Receiver
- Kyle Kerrick, Wide Receiver

=== Returning players ===
Of the 22 starters from 2012, 16 returned for the 2013 campaign. The offense lost only two starters—Sims and Bell—while seven of the starting defensive players return. Junior punter Mike Sadler was the sole returning specialist. The Spartans retained their leaders in passing yards and touchdowns (Maxwell) and receiving yards and touchdowns (Fowler), but lost their leaders in rushing yards and touchdowns (Bell) and interceptions (Adams).

=== Early NFL departures ===
The three Spartans drafted were all early departures; Bell, Gholston, and Sims had all just finished their junior year. No other underclassmen declared for the draft.

=== Recruiting class ===
College recruiting
Name	Hometown	School	Height	Weight	Commit date
Gerald Holmes; RB	Flint, Michigan	Carman-Ainsworth	6 ft 0 in (1.83 m)	205 lb (93 kg)	Feb 5, 2012
Gerald Holmes; RB	Recruit ratings: Scout: Rivals: 247Sports: (75)				
Jon Reschke; LB	Bloomfield, Michigan	Brother Rice	6 ft 2 in (1.88 m)	229 lb (104 kg)	Feb 17, 2012
Jon Reschke; LB	Recruit ratings: Scout: Rivals: 247Sports: (81)				
Jalyn Powell; S	Warren, Ohio	Warren	6 ft 1 in (1.85 m)	185 lb (84 kg)	Feb 25, 2012
Jalyn Powell; S	Recruit ratings: Scout: Rivals: 247Sports: (80)				
R.J. Shelton; RB	Beaver Dam, Wisconsin	Beaver Dam	5 ft 11 in (1.80 m)	185 lb (84 kg)	Feb 26, 2012
R.J. Shelton; RB	Recruit ratings: Scout: Rivals: 247Sports: (76)				
Shane Jones; LB	Cincinnati, Ohio	Archbishop Moeller High School	6 ft 1 in (1.85 m)	220 lb (100 kg)	Apr 16, 2012
Shane Jones; LB	Recruit ratings: Scout: Rivals: 247Sports: (83)				
Damion Terry; QB	Erie, Pennsylvania	Cathedral Prep	6 ft 4 in (1.93 m)	210 lb (95 kg)	Apr 16, 2012
Damion Terry; QB	Recruit ratings: Scout: Rivals: 247Sports: (82)				
Darian Hicks; CB	Solon, Ohio	Solon High School	6 ft 0 in (1.83 m)	175 lb (79 kg)	Jun 20, 2012
Darian Hicks; CB	Recruit ratings: Scout: Rivals: 247Sports: (76)				
Dylan Chmura; TE	Waukesha, Wisconsin	Waukesha West	6 ft 6 in (1.98 m)	225 lb (102 kg)	Jun 24, 2012
Dylan Chmura; TE	Recruit ratings: Scout: Rivals: 247Sports: (NR)				
Trey Kilgore; WR	Cincinnati, Ohio	St. Xavier	6 ft 2 in (1.88 m)	180 lb (82 kg)	Jun 25, 2012
Trey Kilgore; WR	Recruit ratings: Scout: Rivals: 247Sports: (76)				
Devyn Salmon; DT	Plant City, Florida	Plant City	6 ft 1 in (1.85 m)	285 lb (129 kg)	Jul 24, 2012
Devyn Salmon; DT	Recruit ratings: Scout: Rivals: 247Sports: (71)				
Demetrius Cooper; DE	Chicago, Illinois	Julian	6 ft 5 in (1.96 m)	225 lb (102 kg)	Aug 25, 2012
Demetrius Cooper; DE	Recruit ratings: Scout: Rivals: 247Sports: (74)				
Dennis Finley; OT	Detroit, Michigan	Detroit Cass Tech	6 ft 7 in (2.01 m)	285 lb (129 kg)	Aug 26, 2012
Dennis Finley; OT	Recruit ratings: Scout: Rivals: 247Sports: (80)				
Delton Williams; ATH	Erie, Pennsylvania	Cathedral Prep	6 ft 2 in (1.88 m)	205 lb (93 kg)	Oct 9, 2012
Delton Williams; ATH	Recruit ratings: Scout: Rivals: 247Sports: (81)				
Michael Geiger; K	Toledo, Ohio	Ottawa Hills	5 ft 9 in (1.75 m)	180 lb (82 kg)	Dec 8, 2012
Michael Geiger; K	Recruit ratings: Scout: Rivals: 247Sports: (76)				
Noah Jones; DT	Ft. Lauderdale, Florida	Dillard	6 ft 3 in (1.91 m)	270 lb (120 kg)	Jan 20, 2013
Noah Jones; DT	Recruit ratings: Scout: Rivals: 247Sports: (NR)				
Justin Williams; S	Port St. Lucie, Florida	Treasure Coast	6 ft 0 in (1.83 m)	180 lb (82 kg)	Jan 20, 2013
Justin Williams; S	Recruit ratings: Scout: Rivals: 247Sports: (73)				
James Bodanis; DT	Toronto, Ontario, Canada	(JUCO) University of Toronto	6 ft 6 in (1.98 m)	303 lb (137 kg)	Jan 27, 2013
James Bodanis; DT	Recruit ratings: Scout: Rivals: 247Sports: (74)				
Overall recruit ranking: Scout: 45 Rivals: 40 247Sports: 37 ESPN: 35
Note: In many cases, Scout, Rivals, 247Sports, On3, and ESPN may conflict in their listings of height and weight.; In these cases, the average was taken. ESPN grades are on a 100-point scale.; Sources: "2013 Team Ranking". Rivals.com.

== Schedule ==
Date	Time	Opponent	Rank	Site	TV	Result	Attendance
August 30	8:00 p.m.	Western Michigan*		Spartan Stadium; East Lansing, MI	BTN	W 26–13	71,214
September 7	12:00 p.m.	South Florida*		Spartan Stadium; East Lansing, MI	ESPNU	W 21–6	70,401
September 14	2:00 p.m.	Youngstown State*		Spartan Stadium; East Lansing, MI	BTN	W 55–17	71,626
September 21	3:30 p.m.	at No. 22 Notre Dame*		Notre Dame Stadium; Notre Dame, IN (rivalry)	NBC	L 13–17	80,795
October 5	12:00 p.m.	at Iowa		Kinnick Stadium; Iowa City, IA	ESPN2	W 26–14	69,025
October 12	12:00 p.m.	Indiana^{†}		Spartan Stadium; East Lansing, MI (rivalry)	ESPN2	W 42–28	73,815
October 19	12:00 p.m.	Purdue		Spartan Stadium; East Lansing, MI	BTN	W 14–0	71,514
October 26	3:30 p.m.	at Illinois		Memorial Stadium; Champaign, IL	ABC/ESPN2	W 42–3	45,895
November 2	3:30 p.m.	No. 21 Michigan	No. 22	Spartan Stadium; East Lansing, MI (rivalry)	ABC	W 29–6	76,306
November 16	3:30 p.m.	at Nebraska	No. 16	Memorial Stadium; Lincoln, NE	ABC/ESPN2	W 41–28	90,872
November 23	12:00 p.m.	at Northwestern	No. 13	Ryan Field; Evanston, IL	ESPN	W 30–6	40,013
November 30	12:00 p.m.	Minnesota	No. 11	Spartan Stadium; East Lansing, MI	BTN	W 14–3	71,418
December 7	8:17 p.m.	vs. No. 2 Ohio State	No. 10	Lucas Oil Stadium; Indianapolis, IN (Big Ten Championship Game, College GameDay)	FOX	W 34–24	66,002
January 1, 2014	5:10 p.m.	vs. No. 5 Stanford*	No. 4	Rose Bowl; Pasadena, CA (Rose Bowl, College GameDay)	ESPN	W 24–20	95,173
*Non-conference game; ^{†}Homecoming; Rankings from AP Poll released prior to the game; All times are in Eastern time

== Rankings ==
Ranking movements Legend: ██ Increase in ranking ██ Decrease in ranking — = Not ranked RV = Received votes
	Week																
Poll	Pre	1	2	3	4	5	6	7	8	9	10	11	12	13	14	15	Final
AP	RV	RV	RV	RV	RV	RV	RV	RV	RV	24	18	14	13	11	10	4	3
Coaches	RV	RV	RV	24	RV	RV	RV	RV	RV	24	19	16	13	11	9	4	3
Harris	Not released							RV	RV	23	18	15	13	11	10	4	Not released
BCS	Not released								—	22	17	16	13	11	10	4	Not released

== Game summaries ==
=== Western Michigan ===
Western Michigan at Michigan State

Team	1	2	3	4	Total
Western Michigan	0	7	0	6	13
• Michigan State	7	6	6	7	26

- Date: August 30
- Location: Spartan Stadium
  East Lansing, MI
- Game start: 8:00 p.m.
- Elapsed time: 4:35
- Game attendance: 71,214
- Game weather: 82 °F (28 °C), Wind 13 mph (21 km/h) W, cloudy
- Referee: Jerry McGinn
- TV announcers (BTN):
  Eric Collins (Play-by-Play)
  Derek Rackley (Analyst)
  Lisa Byington (Sideline)

Scoring summary
1	6:27	MSU	Kurtis Drummond 21 yd interception return (Kevin Muma kick)	MSU 7–0
2	6:14	WMU	Clark Mussman 14 yd pass from Zach Terrell (Andrew Haldeman kick)	7–7
2	0:22	MSU	Jeremy Langford 2 yd run (Kevin Muma kick failed)	MSU 13–7
3	4:45	MSU	Kevin Muma 20 yd field goal	MSU 16–7
3	0:06	MSU	Kevin Muma 30 yd field goal	MSU 19–7
4	9:02	MSU	Shilique Calhoun 16 yd fumble recovery (Kevin Muma kick)	MSU 26–7
4	1:51	WMU	Corey Davis 14 yd pass from Zach Terrell (Zach Terrell pass failed)	MSU 26–13

Michigan State's 2013 campaign kicked off against Western Michigan with a Friday night battle at Spartan Stadium. Michigan State came into the game with a 10–2 all-time record against the Broncos, who were led by first-year head coach P. J. Fleck. This game was part of the "Celebrate the State" series pitting MSU against Eastern, Central, and Western Michigan over ten seasons. Coming into the game, the Spartans had not lost a home opener since 1998.

The game started with stifling defense. The Spartans were able to secure two first downs on their opening drive and were forced to punt. After both teams went three-and-out, the Broncos appeared to gain some momentum on their second drive. However, on third-and-eleven, Broncos quarterback Tyler Van Tubbergen's pass was intercepted by Jarus Jones. While being tackled, Jones lateraled the ball to Kurtis Drummond, who ran the remaining 21 yards for a touchdown. After both teams exchanged punts, Van Tubbergen again threw an interception. After the interception, Connor Cook took over the quarterbacking duties for the Spartans, but this drive also ended in a punt, as did the two after it. The Broncos took over with 11:31 left in the second quarter, and Van Tuubergen threw two incomplete passes in driving rain. At this point – 9:03 pm – the game was postponed due to lightning. The teams went to their locker rooms and would resume the contest 57 minutes later.

On their next drive, the Broncos were bolstered by a 45-yard pass from Van Tubbergen to Timmy Keith. After Van Tubbergen was hurt two plays later, redshirt freshman Zach Terrell threw a touchdown in his first career snap. While the Spartans had to punt on the ensuing possession, their next drive was aided by 25 yards of penalties from the Broncos and a 26-yard completion from Andrew Maxwell to Bennie Fowler. Jeremy Langford finished off the drive with a touchdown, but Spartan kicker Kevin Muma did not make the point after attempt. After the kickoff, the Broncos let the remaining 22 seconds in the half expire.

Michigan State's second drive of the new half was spurred by a 33-yard punt return by Andre Sims and put the Spartans on the Bronco three-yard line on third down. Unable to convert, the Spartans settled for a field goal by Muma. Michigan State ended up in a similar position two drives later. An interception by Jairus Jones put Michigan State at Western's 12 yard line, but they were unable to gain any yardage and had to settle for a second field goal. Two drives later, Langford fumbled and Bronco Corey Sueing recovered, which stopped a Spartan drive 21 yards from the end zone. However, the Broncos ensuing drive came to an end when Marcus Rush stripped the ball when sacking Terrell. Shilique Calhoun recovered the ball and ran 16 yards for Michigan State's second defensive touchdown. While the game was effectively finished at that point, the Broncos finished the game with a 56-yard touchdown drive, but Terrell was unable to convert the 2-point conversion. With two minutes remaining and no Broncos timeouts left, the Spartans knelt down to run out the clock and earn their first win.

Each team punted 11 times during the game. The Spartans offense combined for 297 yards – 181 from rushing and 118 from passing. Western had 204 offensive yards, but were limited to only 11 yards rushing. The Spartans' two quarterbacks combined for 17 completions on 37 attempts, while the two Broncos quarterbacks went 18 for 48. Terrell lead all quarterbacks with 120 yards and 2 touchdowns. While the Broncos only averaged 0.4 yards per rushing attempt, the Spartans averaged 4.3. Led by Jeremy Langford (94 yds, 1 TD, 1 fumble), the Spartans also had strong rushing performances by Cook (35 yds), Nick Hill (33 yds), and Riley Bullough (12 yds). WMU true freshman Corey Davis led both sides in receiving (8 catches, 96 yds, 1 TD). The Spartans had their worst passing game (3.1 yards per passing attempt) in the 80 games coached by Dantonio.

=== South Florida ===
South Florida at Michigan State

Team	1	2	3	4	Total
South Florida	0	6	0	0	6
• Michigan State	0	7	7	7	21

- Date: September 7
- Location: Spartan Stadium
  East Lansing, MI
- Game start: 12:00 p.m. (scheduled)
  1:07 p.m. (kick-off)
- Elapsed time: 3:25
- Game attendance: 70,401
- Game weather: 76 °F (24 °C), Wind 8 mph (13 km/h) WNW, overcast
- Referee: Ed Ardito
- TV announcers (ESPNU):
  Tom Hart (Play-by-Play)
  John Cengemi (Analyst)

Scoring summary
2	9:30	MSU	Shilique Calhoun 4 yd fumble recovery (Kevin Muma kick)	MSU 7–0
2	2:06	USF	Marvin Kloss 49 yd field goal	MSU 7–3
2	0:03	USF	Marvin Kloss 21 yd field goal	MSU 7–6
3	6:51	MSU	Shilique Calhoun 56 yd interception return (Kevin Muma kick)	MSU 14–6
3	10:12	MSU	Jeremy Langford 2 yd run (Kevin Muma kick)	MSU 21–6

The offense struggled against a South Florida defense that had surrendered 53 points the week before to FCS McNeese State. Jeremy Langford scored the Spartans lone offensive touchdown on a 2-yard run in the 4th quarter. Shilique Calhoun scored two defensive touchdowns, the first coming in the second quarter, as Tyler Hoover stripped USF QB Bobby Eveld of the football at the USF 2 yard line where Calhoun scooped up the ball and scored. His second touchdown came in the third quarter as he intercepted a Bobby Eveld pass and returned the ball 56 yards for a touchdown. Michigan State won 21–6, as the defense completely shutdown the South Florida offense.

=== Youngstown State ===
Youngstown State at Michigan State

Team	1	2	3	4	Total
Youngstown State	3	7	7	0	17
• Michigan State	21	14	14	6	55

- Date: September 14
- Location: Spartan Stadium
  East Lansing, MI
- Game start: 2:00 p.m.
- Elapsed time: 3:18
- Game attendance: 71,626
- Game weather: 63 °F (17 °C), 6 mph (9.7 km/h) W, Sunny
- Referee: Mike Cannon
- TV announcers (BTN):
  Paul Burmeister (Play-by-Play)
  Derek Rackley (Analyst)

Scoring summary
1	11:49	MSU	Jeremy Langford 3 yd run (Kevin Muma kick)	MSU 7–0
1	08:38	YSU	Joey Cejudo 34 yd field goal	MSU 7–3
1	06:23	MSU	Andre Sims Jr. 13 yd pass from Connor Cook (Kevin Muma kick)	MSU 14–3
1	01:11	MSU	Trevon Pendleton 12 yd pass from Connor Cook (Kevin Muma kick)	MSU 21–3
2	04:57	YSU	Martin Ruiz 5 yd run (Joey Cejudo kick)	MSU 21–10
2	03:24	MSU	Macgarrett Kings Jr. 24 yd pass from Connor Cook (Kevin Muma kick)	MSU 28–10
2	01:50	MSU	Bennie Fowler 17 yd pass from Connor Cook (Kevin Muma kick)	MSU 35–10
3	12:12	MSU	Nick Hill 35 yd run (Kevin Muma kick)	MSU 42–10
3	03:58	MSU	Jeremy Langford 2 yd run (Kevin Muma kick)	MSU 49–10
3	01:36	YSU	Martin Ruiz 34 yd pass from Kurt Hess (Joey Cejudo kick)	MSU 49–17
4	07:37	MSU	Kevin Muma 20 yd field goal	MSU 52–17
4	05:22	MSU	Kevin Muma 22 yd field goal	MSU 55–17

Michigan State's third game of the season was against the Penguins of Youngstown State University. The Spartans opened their 2011 season against Youngstown State, defeating the Penguins 28–6.

Connor Cook became the first Michigan State quarterback since Brian Hoyer to throw for 4 touchdowns in a game; all of Cook's touchdowns were thrown in the first half. The game was so out of hand in the second half that both Tyler O'Connor and Andrew Maxwell were both given playing time at the quarterback position. Standout performances from Nick Hill and Jeremy Langford proved big, as the Spartans rushed for 277 yards as a team, with 3 touchdowns. All in all, a big day for the offense lead the Spartans to a 55–17 victory over FCS opponent Youngstown State.

=== Notre Dame ===
Michigan State at Notre Dame
(Megaphone Trophy)

Team	1	2	3	4	Total
Michigan State	0	7	3	3	13
• No. 22 Notre Dame	3	7	0	7	17

- Date: September 21
- Location: Notre Dame Stadium
  Notre Dame, IN
- Game start: 3:30 p.m.
- Elapsed time: 3:29
- Game attendance: 80,795
- Game weather: 65 °F (18 °C), 14 mph (23 km/h) NW, Partly Sunny
- Referee: Dave Witvoet
- TV announcers (NBC):
  Dan Hicks (Play-by-Play)
  Mike Mayock (Analyst)
  Alex Flanagan (Sideline)

Scoring summary
1	03:48	ND	Kyle Brindza 41 yd field goal	ND 3–0
2	07:43	MSU	Macgarrett Kings Jr. 12 yd pass from Connor Cook (Michael Geiger kick)	MSU 7–3
2	00:17	ND	T.J. Jones 2 yd pass from Tommy Rees (Kyle Brindza kick)	ND 10–7
3	06:21	MSU	Michael Geiger 25 yd field goal	TIE 10–10
4	14:44	ND	Cam McDaniel 7 yd run (Kyle Brindza kick)	ND 17–10
4	10:40	MSU	Michael Geiger 42 yd field goal	ND 17–13

Michigan State's final non-conference game was against the Fighting Irish of Notre Dame in a matchup for the Megaphone Trophy. Coming into the matchup, the Irish had won the previous two meetings between the schools.

Notre Dame struck first, scoring the only points in the opening quarter, as kicker Kyle Brindza nailed a 41-yard field goal. The Spartans took the lead in the second quarter, as Connor Cook found Macgarrett Kings in the corner of the end zone for a 12-yard touchdown pass to take the lead 7–3. Notre Dame would respond with a touchdown of their own after a pass interference penalty called against Trae Waynes on fourth and one put them deep in Michigan State territory. Several plays later, Irish quarterback Tommy Rees would find T.J. Jones in the back of the end zone for a two-yard touchdown pass to give the Irish a 10–7 lead at halftime.

The second half continued to be a low-scoring affair. Michigan State was able to tie the score in the 3rd quarter, as Freshmen kicker Michael Geiger made his first field goal of his collegiate career from 25 yards, tying the game at 10 apiece. A turnover late in the third quarter proved costly for the Spartans, as on a halfback pass, true Freshmen R.J. Shelton threw an interception which swung momentum in Notre Dame's favor. The Irish re-took the lead for good in the fourth quarter on a Cam McDaniel seven-yard touchdown run. Geiger added a 42-yard field goal to make the score 17–13. The Spartans had an opportunity to take the lead in the closing minutes with one last drive. On their final drive, coach Mark Dantonio decided to pull a struggling Connor Cook (who had played every snap) in favor of the previous season's starter, Andrew Maxwell. The Spartans went four and out, Notre Dame took over on downs, and ran out the clock.

Michigan State suffered its first loss (and would end up being its only loss) of the year, falling to 3–1, while Notre Dame improved their record to 3–1. This was the Fighting Irish's third consecutive victory over the Spartans. Notre Dame and Michigan State would not play each other again until 2016.

In February, 2018, the NCAA announced that Notre Dame would be forced to vacate all wins from the 2013 season, including this victory over the Spartans, due to academic misconduct.

=== Iowa ===
Michigan State at Iowa

Team	1	2	3	4	Total
• Michigan State	0	10	10	6	26
Iowa	0	14	0	0	14

- Date: October 5
- Location: Kinnick Stadium
  Iowa City, IA
- Game start: 12:00
- Elapsed time: 3:26
- Game attendance: 69,025
- Game weather: 69 °F (21 °C), 10 mph (16 km/h) W, scattered showers
- Referee: Don Capron
- TV announcers (ESPN2):
  Beth Mowins (Play-by-Play)
  Joey Galloway (Analyst)
  Paul Carcaterra (Sideline)

Scoring summary
2	11:44	MSU	Michael Geiger 27 yd field goal	MSU 3–0
2	06:18	MSU	Macgarrett Kings Jr. 46 yd pass from Connor Cook (Michael Geiger kick)	MSU 10–0
2	04:19	IOWA	Damon Bullock 47 yd pass from Jake Rudock (Mike Meyer kick)	MSU 10–7
2	01:10	IOWA	C.J. Fiedorowicz 10 yd pass from Jake Rudock (Mike Meyer kick)	IOWA 14–10
3	11:55	MSU	Bennie Fowler 37 yd pass from Connor Cook (Michael Geiger kick)	MSU 17–14
3	02:38	MSU	Michael Geiger 35 yd field goal	MSU 20–14
4	13:28	MSU	Michael Geiger 49 yd field goal	MSU 23–14
4	05:25	MSU	Michael Geiger 40 yd field goal	MSU 26–14

After a bye week, the Spartans opened their conference schedule against the Hawkeyes of the University of Iowa. Iowa had won last year's meeting in East Lansing in double overtime by the score of 19–16.

After a scoreless 1st quarter, in which Michigan State turned the ball over on downs after failing a 4th down attempt, Michigan State scored first in the 2nd quarter after a lengthy drive ended with a Michael Geiger 27-yard field goal. Michigan State took a 3–0 lead. The Spartan defense forced an Iowa punt after a 3 play, 6 yard Iowa possession. The offense got the ball at their own 25. Connor Cook completed a pass to Bennie Fowler on 3rd and 6 for 12 yards to pick up a first down. The following play, Cook took off for an 11-yard run down to the Iowa 48. Several plays later, Jeremy Langford would pick up a blitz on 3rd and 8 which allowed Connor Cook to find Macgarrett Kings, who then avoided several defenders on his way to the end zone for 46-yard touchdown pass to put Michigan State up 10–0. Iowa would get the score within 3 after a Jake Rudock swing pass to Damon Bullock went 47 yards for a touchdown to make it 10–7. After the Hawkeye defense forced a punt, Iowa scored another touchdown on their next possession, this time in the form of a Rudock pass to big TE C.J. Fiedorowicz 10 yards out. Iowa would have a 14–10 lead going into halftime.

Michigan State received the ball to start the second half and re-took the lead on their opening possession. Connor Cook led the offense directly down the field and finished off the drive with a 37-yard bomb to Bennie Fowler for a touchdown to re-take the lead 17–14. Cook only threw one incompletion the entire drive. Michael Geiger would then add a 35-yard field goal to put the lead at 20–14 going into the 4th quarter.

In the 4th quarter, with it only being a 6-point game, Mark Dantonio called a fake punt on 4th and 4 as punter Mike Sadler ran for 25 yards to the Iowa 38 yard line to pick up the first down. As with most Spartan trick plays, coach Dantonio coined this one "Hey diddle, diddle, send Sadler up the middle". Michigan State would add another field goal, as Michael Geiger made his 3rd kick of the day, this time from 49 yards, to make the score 23–14. After Iowa missed a field goal attempt to bring the game within 6, Michigan State would add yet another field goal to their score on their next possession, with Michael Geiger converting his fourth field goal attempt, this one going for 45 yards. The score was now 26–14 Michigan State. On the next Iowa possession, Darqueze Dennard would record his 2nd interception of the day, picking off Rudock on the first play of the drive. With 4 minutes remaining in the game, Iowa got the ball back, but took too much time trying to score, and failed to score a touchdown on 4th and 5 from the Michigan State 16 yard line. The Spartans took over on downs and kneeled out the clock for their first conference win.

Connor Cook threw for a career-high (at the time) 277 yards as the Spartans overcame a 14–10 halftime deficit to win on the road in Iowa City.

=== Indiana ===
Indiana at Michigan State
(Old Brass Spittoon)

Team	1	2	3	4	Total
Indiana	7	7	7	7	28
• Michigan State	0	21	14	7	42

- Date: October 12
- Location: Spartan Stadium
  East Lansing, MI
- Game start: 12:00
- Elapsed time: 3:27
- Game attendance: 73,815
- Game weather: 67 °F (19 °C), Wind 5 mph (8.0 km/h) S, Sunny
- Referee: Alex Kemp
- TV announcers (ESPN2):
  Beth Mowins (Play-by-Play)
  Joey Galloway (Analyst)
  Paul Carcaterra (Sideline)

Scoring summary
1	13:59	IU	Tevin Coleman 64 yd run (Mitch Ewald kick)	IU 7–0
2	13:34	MSU	Jeremy Langford 11 yd pass from Connor Cook (Michael Geiger kick)	TIE 7–7
2	07:13	MSU	Bennie Fowler 34 yd pass from Connor Cook (Michael Geiger kick)	MSU 14–7
2	04:36	IU	Cody Latimer 3 yd pass from Tre Roberson (Mitch Ewald kick)	TIE 14–14
2	00:37	MSU	Jeremy Langford 5 yd run (Michael Geiger kick)	MSU 21–14
3	10:03	MSU	Jeremy Langford 2 yd run (Michael Geiger kick)	MSU 28–14
3	07:47	IU	Shane Wynn 2 yd run (Mitch Ewald kick)	MSU 28–21
3	03:23	MSU	Jeremy Langford 32 yd run (Michael Geiger kick)	MSU 35–21
4	12:34	MSU	R.J. Shelton 34 yd run (Michael Geiger kick)	MSU 42–21
4	02:17	IU	Ted Bolser 4 yd pass from Tre Roberson (Mitch Ewald kick)	MSU 42–28

Michigan State's homecoming game will be against the Hoosiers of Indiana University. The winner of this game will earn the Old Brass Spittoon.

this needs an update

=== Purdue ===
Purdue at Michigan State

Team	1	2	3	4	Total
Purdue	0	0	0	0	0
• Michigan State	0	7	0	7	14

- Date: October 19
- Location: Spartan Stadium
  East Lansing, MI
- Game start: 12:01
- Elapsed time: 2:57
- Game attendance: 71,514
- Game weather: 45 °F (7 °C), Wind 10 mph (16 km/h) WSW, Cloudy
- Referee: John O'Neil
- TV announcers (Big Ten Network):
  Eric Collins (Play-by-Play)
  Derek Rackley (Analyst)
  Eric Crouch (Sideline)

Scoring summary
2	10:17	MSU	Denicos Allen 45 yd fumble return (Michael Geiger kick)	MSU 7–0
4	08:55	MSU	Andrew Gleichert 5 yd pass from Tony Lippett (Michael Geiger kick)	MSU 14–0

The wet and cold fall weather would prove to be a factor for both teams during the game, as the Spartans and Boilermakers fought a low scoring game with half of the points scored coming from the defensive side of the ball. Spartan linebacker Denicos Allen returned a Purdue fumble 45 yards for the first touchdown of the day after Max Bullough hit Purdue quarterback Danny Etling hard in the second quarter. Purdue's offense was held scoreless thanks to a strong defensive effort by the Spartans, missed field goals of 51 and 41 yards, and an interception by Isaiah Lewis in the end zone. Michigan State would get the only offensive points for the day when the ball was lateraled to Tony Lippett who threw to an open TE Andrew Gleichert for a 5-yard score. Michigan State earned bowl eligibility with the win for the 7th straight year under coach Mark Dantonio.

=== Illinois ===
Michigan State at Illinois

Team	1	2	3	4	Total
• Michigan State	0	14	14	14	42
Illinois	3	0	0	0	3

- Date: October 26
- Location: Memorial Stadium
  Champaign, IL
- Game start: 3:36
- Elapsed time: 2:59
- Game attendance: 45,895
- Game weather: 61 °F (16 °C), Wind 21 mph (34 km/h) WNW, Mostly Sunny
- Referee: Todd Geerlings
- TV announcers (ABC/ESPN2):
  Bob Wischusen (Play-by-Play)
  Rod Gilmore (Analyst)
  Quint Kessenich (Sideline)

Scoring summary
1	09:41	ILL	Taylor Zalewksi 31 yd field goal	ILL 3–0
2	12:40	MSU	Jeremy Langford 1 yd run (Michael Geiger kick)	MSU 7–3
2	00:09	MSU	Bennie Fowler 29 yd pass from Connor Cook (Michael Geiger Kick)	MSU 14–3
3	10:07	MSU	Josiah Price 13 yd pass from Connor Cook (Michael Geiger kick)	MSU 21–3
3	02:37	MSU	Jeremy Langford 7 yd run (Michael Geiger kick)	MSU 28–3
4	14:52	MSU	Keith Mumphery 47 yd pass from Connor Cook (Michael Geiger kick)	MSU 35–3
4	08:05	MSU	Delton Williams 42 yd run (Michael Geiger kick)	MSU 42–3

Michigan State closed out the first half of their conference schedule against the Illini of the University of Illinois. The last time the two schools met was in 2010, where the Spartans came out on top 26–6 en route to a share of the Big Ten title.

In a dominating performance on both sides of the football, Michigan State defeated Illinois in convincing fashion, by the score of 42–3. Connor Cook set a school record for passing efficiency, completing 15 of 16 passes for 208 yards and 3 touchdown passes. Jeremy Langford also compiled his 3rd consecutive 100 yard rushing performance, with 104 yards on 22 carries and 2 touchdowns.

The Spartan defense put on a dominant performance, with a key moment in the game coming in the 2nd quarter, as the Illini were on the Michigan State goal line with an opportunity to take the lead. In what would swing the momentum in favor of Michigan State, the Spartan defense made an impressive goal line stand, preventing them from scoring on 4th down. They also held Illinois to 128 yards of total offense, only surrendering 8 first downs all game, and held the Illini to 3 points—all of which were season lows. The Illini were averaging 35.3 points a game coming into this contest.

Michigan State improved their conference record to 4–0, 7–1 overall. This loss signified the 17th consecutive conference defeat for Illinois.

=== Michigan ===
Michigan at Michigan State
(Paul Bunyan Trophy)

Team	1	2	3	4	Total
No. 23 Michigan	3	3	0	0	6
• No. 24 Michigan State	3	10	3	13	29

- Date: November 2
- Location: Spartan Stadium
  East Lansing, MI
- Game start: 3:30
- Elapsed time: 3:17
- Game attendance: 76,306
- Game weather: 46 °F (8 °C), Wind 9 mph (14 km/h) NNE, Cloudy
- Referee: Bill LeMonnier
- TV announcers (ABC):
  Brad Nessler (Play-by-Play)
  Todd Blackledge (Analyst)
  Holly Rowe (Sideline)

Scoring summary
1	10:38	UM	Matt Wile 49 yd field goal	UM 3–0
1	09:10	MSU	Michael Geiger 40 yd field goal	TIE 3–3
2	11:19	MSU	Michael Geiger 44 yd field goal	MSU 6–3
2	03:22	UM	Brendon Gibbons 39 yd field goal	TIE 6–6
2	00:23	MSU	Bennie Fowler 14 yd pass from Connor Cook (Michael Geiger kick)	MSU 13–6
3	9:54	MSU	Michael Geiger 35 yd field goal	MSU 16–6
4	10:31	MSU	Connor Cook 1 yd run (PAT blocked)	MSU 22–6
4	02:43	MSU	Jeremy Langford 40 yd run (Michael Geiger kick)	MSU 29–6

Michigan State opened their November schedule against the Wolverines of the University of Michigan. The Paul Bunyan Trophy was on the line. Sloppy weather conditions marred the 106th annual meeting between the Michigan State Spartans and the Wolverines of Michigan.

Michigan had possession of the ball first, with Devin Gardner completing 2 passes right of the bat to Jeremy Gallon for 35 and 11 yards respectively. Michigan's drive stalled after Denicos Allen and Shilique Calhoun combined for a sack on Devin Gardner for a loss of 10 yards. Michigan would make a 49-yard field goal to go up 3–0. Michigan State's first offensive possession started off with an explosive play, as Connor Cook, scrambling to his right, threw a check down pass to fullback Trevon Pendleton, which went for 49 yards, putting them in Michigan territory. However, the Spartans were unable to convert on 3rd down and were forced to settle for a field goal, tying the game at 3 a piece. Neither team would have much success in the quarter after their initial offensive possessions, punting the ball back and forth throughout. The Spartan defense would record 4 sacks on Devin Gardner in the 1st quarter alone.

On the opening possession of the 2nd quarter, Connor Cook led the offense down to the Michigan 26 yard line before being denied on 3rd and 7. Freshmen kicker Michael Geiger would nail his second 40-yard field goal of the game, this time from 44 yards, to put the Spartans up 6–3. On the ensuing Michigan possession, Devin Gardner completed a 58-yard pass to TE Jehu Chesson to put the Wolverines in Michigan State territory, but the defense stood tall, forcing the Wolverines to kick a field from 39 yards, which Michigan kicker Brendan Gibbons (who in the previous matchup kicked the game-winning field goal as time expired to give Michigan their first win over Michigan State since 2007) was able to make. Michigan State would then receive the football with 3:22 remaining in the half. Connor Cook, much like the first possession of the quarter, led the offense down the field and with 23 seconds remaining in the half, found Bennie Fowler in the righthand corner of the end zone for a 14-yard touchdown pass. After converting the extra point, Michigan State held a 13–6 lead going into halftime.

The Spartans would receive the ball to start the second half, and they took advantage of it, as Connor Cook led the offense down the field before coming up short on 3rd and 11 after an 8-yard pass to Tony Lippett. Michael Geiger would make his 3rd field goal of the day, this time from 35 yards. Later in the quarter, Michigan cornerback Raymon Taylor would cause the first turnover of the game, picking off Connor Cook and returning it 17 yards to set the Michigan offense up with good field position. However, it was all for naught, as the Michigan State defense recorded a tackle for loss and 2 sacks on the following possession for the Wolverines. Michigan was forced to punt the ball and did not have a single positive yardage play the entire possession, as they had a total of 3 plays for −21 yards. With that came the end of the 3rd quarter.

The 4th quarter was all Spartans, as on the opening drive of the quarter, Connor Cook and Jeremy Langford led the offense all the way down to the 1 yard line of Michigan. Connor Cook would then take the ball in for a touchdown on a QB draw, which put Michigan State up 22–6; the extra point was blocked. On the next Michigan possession, Devin Gardner would try to get Michigan back in the game, driving the Wolverines all the way to the Michigan State 15 yard line before Darqueze Dennard intercepted a pass intended for Jeremy Gallon at the Spartan 3 yard line, thus putting a lid on any potential comeback. The Spartan offense would then widen the gap, as they ate up the clock, going on an 8-play, 97-yard drive that would take 3:40 off the clock. The drive concluded with a 40-yard rushing touchdown from Jeremy Langford, the longest of his career, to put Michigan State up 29–6 with 2:43 left. After apparently suffering an injury on the previous drive, Devin Gardner sat out for Michigan's final drive, as true Freshmen quarterback Shane Morris would come in for backup duty. Michigan failed to convert on 4th and 4, and turned the ball over to the Spartans. In a show of respect to Senior QB Andrew Maxwell, who was the starting quarterback the year before, coach Mark Dantonio allowed him to take one final snap as a Spartan against Michigan, as he took the final knee to end the game.

The Spartan defense, in a physically dominating performance, recorded 7 sacks on Michigan QB Devin Gardner and held the Wolverines to a program low −48 yards rushing, en route to an impressive 29–6 victory over their in-state rivals. Denicos Allen, Shilique Calhoun, and Ed Davis all recorded 2.5 sacks each. Jeremy Langford had his 4th consecutive 100 yard rushing performance, carrying the ball 26 times for 120 yards and a touchdown. Connor Cook went 18/33 for 252 yards, 2 touchdowns (1 passing, 1 rushing), and an interception. This was the largest margin of victory for the Spartans over the Wolverines since 1967, when Michigan State defeated Michigan 34–0, and their 5th victory over Michigan in the last 6 years. More importantly however, the Paul Bunyan Trophy returned to East Lansing.

=== Nebraska ===
Michigan State at Nebraska

Team	1	2	3	4	Total
• No. 14 Michigan State	10	10	7	14	41
Nebraska	0	7	14	7	28

- Date: November 16
- Location: Memorial Stadium
  Lincoln, NE
- Game start: 3:37
- Elapsed time: 3:36
- Game attendance: 90,872
- Game weather: 64 °F (18 °C), Wind: 12–28 mph (19–45 km/h) SW, Sunny
- Referee: Don Capron
- TV announcers (ABC/ESPN2):
  Sean McDonough (Play-by-Play)
  Chris Spielman (Analyst)
  Shannon Spake (Sideline)

Scoring summary
1	12:23	MSU	Michael Geiger 45 yd field goal	MSU 3–0
1	04:57	MSU	R.J. Shelton 5 yd run (Michael Geiger kick)	MSU 10–0
1	02:44	NEB	Sam Burtch 32 yd pass from Tommy Armstrong Jr. (Pat Smith kick)	MSU 10–7
2	10:29	MSU	Michael Geiger 25 yd kick	MSU 13–7
2	00:21	MSU	Jeremy Langford 6 yd run (Michael Geiger kick)	MSU 20–7
3	11:25	NEB	Imani Cross 51 yd run (Pat Smith kick)	MSU 20–14
3	05:26	MSU	Jeremy Langford 3 yd run (Michael Geiger kick)	MSU 27–14
3	01:12	NEB	Kenny Bell 38 yd pass from Tommy Armstong Jr. (Pat Smith kick)	MSU 27–21
4	07:56	MSU	Keith Mumphery 27 yd pass from Connor Cook (Michael Geiger kick)	MSU 34–21
4	01:58	MSU	Jeremy Langford 37 yd run (Michael Geiger kick)	MSU 41–21
4	00:10	NEB	Ameer Abdullah 12 yd pass from Ron Kellogg III (Pat Smith kick)	MSU 41–28

After a bye week, the Spartans played against the Cornhuskers of the University of Nebraska–Lincoln. In a key Legends division matchup between Michigan State and Nebraska, in which a victory for either team would put them in the drivers seat for the division title, the Spartans would come out victorious 41–28, getting revenge for last years loss to the Cornhuskers in East Lansing.

On the opening drive, Nebraska running back Terrell Newby fumbled a pitch on an option play which was recovered by Michigan State. After Connor Cook overthrew a wide open Bennie Fowler in the back of the end zone, the Spartans had to settle for a field goal, giving them a 3–0 lead. On the ensuing Nebraska possession, QB Tommy Armstrong was intercepted by Kurtis Drummond. The Nebraska defense stood tall however, and forced a Michigan State punt. On the return, Nebraska punt returner Jordan Westerkamp muffed the catch and regained possession, but a tackle made by Kurtis Drummond jarred the ball loose and the Spartans recovered the fumble at the Nebraska 8 yard line. Michigan State was quick to capitalize, taking only 46 seconds to score on a R.J. Shelton 5 yard rushing touchdown, putting them up 10–0. Nebraska would respond with a 32-yard touchdown pass from Tommy Armstrong to Sam Burtch, the first touchdown the Spartan defense had allowed in 3 games. As the 1st quarter came to an end, Michigan State was holding on to a 10–7 lead.

Capping off a lengthy drive that began in the 1st quarter, Michigan State added another field goal to its score, going up 13–7. The remainder of the 2nd quarter was a battle of field position, as neither offenses could find their way into the red zone. However, with 2:32 remaining in the first half, Shilique Calhoun forced Tommy Armstrong to fumble the football deep in Nebraska territory, which was recovered by Michigan State. The Spartan offense, in what would be a recurring theme of the game, capitalized off of another Nebraska turnover, as Jeremy Langford carried several defenders into the end zone with him for a 6-yard rushing touchdown, putting Michigan State up 20–7 going into halftime.

In the 3rd quarter, Nebraska struck gold on its first possession of the second half after Michigan State was forced to punt on its opening drive. With the score 20–14, punter Mike Sadler pinned Nebraska down at their own 1 yard line after a 35-yard punt. On the first play of the possession, Tommy Armstong fumbled the ball, which was recovered by Trae Waynes at the Nebraska 3 yard line with 5:30 left in the quarter. Jeremy Langford would score on the first play, taking it in from 3 yards out to put the score at 27–14. Nebraska would score on the ensuing possession, going on an 11-play, 79-yard drive, which was capped off with a 38-yard touchdown pass from Tommy Armstrong to Kenny Bell.

At the start of the 4th quarter, the Spartan defense held up, forcing Nebraska to punt the ball. Michigan State's offense would start at their own 25 yard line. They were able to move the ball all the way to the Nebraska 31 yard line, but were unable to convert on 3rd and 5, as a Connor Cook pass to Jeremy Langford came up 1 yard short. With the game on the line, Mark Dantonio called a fake field goal attempt on 4th and 1, as Mike Sadler managed to get 3 yards on the fake to pick up the first down. After an Ineligible Downfield penalty, Michigan State faced 3rd and 18. Jeremy Langford was able to pick up a blitz on the next play, giving Connor Cook the time to find Keith Mumphery for a 27-yard touchdown pass. With 5:46 remaining, Michigan State took a 34–21 lead. The Spartan defense would then force Nebraska to punt the ball. On the ensuing Spartan possession, the offense grinded down the clock, tiring out the Nebraska defense. The drive ended after Jeremy Langford scored his 3rd touchdown of the day as he ran all the way to the end zone 37 yards out. Nebraska would score a touchdown with 10 seconds left, but the game was well out of reach at that point.

With 32 carries for 152 yards and 3 touchdowns, Jeremy Langford recorded his 5th straight 100 yard rushing performance, increasing his rushing totals to 926 yards and 199 carries. With this victory, Michigan State took a commanding lead in the Legends division as they improved their conference record to 6–0, 9–1 overall. With a loss, Nebraska fell to 4–2 in conference, 7–3 overall.

=== Northwestern ===
Michigan State at Northwestern

Team	1	2	3	4	Total
• No. 13 Michigan State	0	14	9	7	30
Northwestern	3	3	0	0	6

- Date: November 23
- Location: Ryan Field
  Evanston, IL
- Game start: 12:01
- Elapsed time: 2:59
- Game attendance: 40,013
- Game weather: 23 °F (−5 °C), Wind 17 mph (27 km/h) NNW, Partly Cloudy
- Referee: Alex Kemp
- TV announcers (ESPN):
  Bob Wischusen (Play-by-Play)
  Rod Gilmore (Analyst)
  Quint Kessenich (Sideline)

Scoring summary
1	07:55	NW	Jeff Budzien 22 yard field goal	NW 3–0
2	08:22	MSU	Jeremy Langford 20 yd run (Michael Geiger kick)	MSU 7–3
2	04:31	MSU	Bennie Fowler 87 yd pass from Connor Cook (Michael Geiger kick)	MSU 14–3
2	01:52	NW	Jeff Budzien 20 yd field goal	MSU 14–6
3	11:33	MSU	Michael Geiger 37 yd kick	MSU 17–6
3	05:00	MSU	Josiah Price 15 yd pass from Connor Cook (PAT blocked)	MSU 23–6
4	12:37	MSU	Jeremy Langford 37 yd run (Michael Geiger kick)	MSU 30–6

In their penultimate match-up of the season, the Spartans would face the Wildcats of Northwestern University. Northwestern defeated MSU in East Lansing the previous season, 23–20. Securing a victory in this game would earn Michigan State its 2nd Legends Division title in 3 years.

The 1st quarter featured both offenses going on lengthy drives, but were unable to score much, as of the 2 teams, Northwestern was only able to score a field goal, giving them a 3–0 leading going into the 2nd quarter. Offensively, the Spartans gained some momentum on their opening drive of the 2nd quarter in which Jeremy Langford carried the ball 8 times, the last of which was a 20-yard rush for a touchdown to put Michigan State up 7–3. After the Spartan defense forced a punt, the offense would get the ball back at their own 8 yard line. On 3rd and 5, Bennie Fowler bobbled a pass from Connor Cook over the head of 2 defenders, regained possession of the ball and scored on an 87-yard pass (the longest scoring play of the season for Michigan State) to give MSU a 14–3 lead. Northwestern would answer right back, making a field goal on their next possession to cut the deficit to 12. The score was 14–6 going into halftime.

The Spartans received the ball first to start the 2nd half and scored on a 37-yard field goal from Michael Geiger, putting the score at 17–6. Michigan State would further add to its score on their next possession, going 8 plays, 87 yards on drive that was capped off with a 15-yard play action pass from Connor Cook to Josiah Price, giving the Spartans a 23–6 lead; the PAT was blocked. The Spartans would score once more in the 4th quarter on a Jeremy Langford 37-yard touchdown run. Michigan State won 30–6.

The Spartan defense recorded 3 interceptions and Connor Cook threw for a then career-high 293 yards, completing 16/23 passes for 2 TDs. Jeremy Langford recorded his 6th consecutive 100 yard rushing game on 25 carries, 150 yards rushing, and 2 TDs. Michigan State secured a spot in the 2013 Big Ten Football Championship Game, in the process winning their 2nd Legends Division title in 3 years.

=== Minnesota ===
Minnesota at Michigan State

Team	1	2	3	4	Total
Minnesota	0	3	0	0	3
• No. 11 Michigan State	7	0	7	0	14

- Date: November 30
- Location: Spartan Stadium
  East Lansing, MI
- Game start: 12:00
- Elapsed time: 2:57
- Game attendance: 71,418
- Game weather: 35 °F (2 °C), Wind: 11 mph (18 km/h) SSW, Partly Cloudy
- Referee: John O'Neill
- TV announcers (BTN):
  Kevin Kugler (Play-by-Play)
  Glen Mason (Analyst)
  J Leman (Sideline)

Scoring summary
1	08:20	MSU	Jeremy Langford 15 yd run (Michael Geiger kick)	MSU 7–0
2	03:49	MINN	Chris Hawthorne 21 yd field goal	MSU 7–3
3	12:20	MSU	Josiah Price 12 yd pass from Connor Cook (Michael Geiger kick)	MSU 14–3

The Spartans closed out their regular season against the Golden Gophers of the University of Minnesota. Michigan State defeated Minnesota the previous year in the final game of the season to gain bowl eligibility.

After forcing a Minnesota punt on their opening possession, Michigan State would score first, putting together a 7-play, 80-yard drive that concluded with a Jeremy Langford run of 15 yards, giving Michigan State a 7–0 lead. On the ensuing Minnesota possession, Trae Waynes would record his first interception of the season, giving the ball right back to the offense. The offense, however, was unable to score and was forced to punt. The first quarter concluded with a 7–0 Michigan State lead, as neither team was able to score after the initial Michigan State possession. Not much would change in the 2nd quarter as the only score was a 21-yard field goal made by Minnesota kicker Chris Hawthorne to make the score 7–3 going into halftime. Both teams had an opportunity to score before halftime, but Minnesota QB Phillip Nelson and Connor Cook both threw interceptions in their opponents territory.

The general offensive stagnation came to an end on Michigan State's opening drive, as Connor Cook led the MSU offense down the field for a touchdown, connecting with Josiah Price for a 12-yard touchdown pass. Michigan State would take a 14–3 lead and never look back. Neither team would score for the remainder of the game in what would go down as a defensive slug fest.

Jeremy Langford rushed for 134 yards on 24 carries and scored one of the games only touchdowns, in the process tying the school record for most consecutive 100 yard rushing performances with 7. Michigan State recorded their 3rd 11th win season in 4 years. Michigan State became the first Big Ten team to win all eight conference games by double digits since the conference went to an eight-game schedule in 1971. They also became the first unbeaten Big Ten team to win all of its conference games by double-figures since Michigan in 1943 (6–0).

=== Ohio State (Big Ten Championship Game) ===
Ohio State vs Michigan State
(Big Ten Championship Game)

Team	1	2	3	4	Total
No. 2 Ohio State	0	10	14	0	24
• No. 10 Michigan State	3	14	3	14	34

- Date: December 7
- Location: Lucas Oil Stadium, Indianapolis, IN
- Game start: 8:19
- Elapsed time: 3:38
- Game attendance: 66,002
- Referee: Dan Capron
- TV announcers (FOX/Compass Media):
  Gus Johnson (Play-by-Play)
  Charles Davis (Analyst)
  Kristina Pink (Sideline)
  Erin Andrews (Sideline)
  Gregg Daniels (Play-by-Play)
  Dale Hellestrae (Analyst)

Scoring summary
1	08:31	MSU	Michael Geiger 40 yd field goal	MSU 3–0
2	14:50	MSU	Keith Mumphery 72 yd pass from Connor Cook (Michael Geiger kick)	MSU 10–0
2	09:01	MSU	Tony Lippett 33 yd pass from Connor Cook (Michael Geiger kick)	MSU 17–0
2	06:26	OSU	Philly Brown 20 yd pass from Braxton Miller (Drew Basil kick)	MSU 17–7
2	00:00	OSU	Drew Basil 28 yd field goal	MSU 17–10
3	12:21	OSU	Braxton Miller 8 yd run (Drew Basil kick)	TIE 17–17
3	05:36	OSU	Braxton Miller 6 yd run (Drew Basil kick)	OSU 24–17
3	02:39	MSU	Michael Geiger 44 yd field goal	OSU 24–20
4	11:41	MSU	Josiah Price 9 yd pass from Connor Cook (Michael Geiger kick)	MSU 27–24
4	02:36	MSU	Jeremy Langford 26 yd run (Michael Geiger kick)	MSU 34–24

In a rematch of a very close game last year in East Lansing, the Leaders division champion Ohio State Buckeyes would face the Legends division champion Michigan State Spartans in the Big Ten Championship Game. Michigan State made its second appearance in the conference championship game, having lost to Wisconsin in the inaugural title game. A lot was on the line, as Ohio State came into the game on a 24-game winning streak and was ranked No. 2 in the BCS standings. With a win, Ohio State was practically guaranteed a spot in the 2014 BCS National Championship Game. In Michigan State's case, they were seeking their first BCS bowl bid ever. The Spartans were also seeking their first Rose Bowl appearance since 1988 where they defeated USC 20–17. Although Michigan State technically would have been able to get invited to the Rose Bowl even if they lost (as long as they were ranked within the top 14 in the BCS standings), the Spartans wanted to win the Big Ten outright. Needless to say, motivation and incentive for both teams were high. Ohio State would win the coin toss and defer possession until the second half.

Several Ohio State Pass Interference penalties kept the Michigan State offense on the field on the opening drive, where the Spartans stalled at the Buckeye 23 yard line after two consecutive Connor Cook incompletions. Michael Geiger put MSU up 3–0 after making a 40-yard field goal. The remainder of the 1st quarter was a defensive struggle, as neither team could manage to get into opposing territory. The score was 3–0 going into the 2nd quarter; Ohio State was held scoreless in the 1st quarter for the first since playing Penn State the previous season.

On the first play of the second quarter, Connor Cook hit Keith Mumphery for 72-yard touchdown pass (the second longest scoring play all season for the Spartans) to put Michigan State up 10–0. Michigan State would add to its lead on their next possession as Connor Cook hit Tony Lippett in the corner of the endzone on a 33-yard pass, giving the Spartans a 17–0 lead. Trailing 17–0, Braxton Miller led Ohio State on its first scoring drive which ended after Miller found Corey "Philly" Brown over the top of the Michigan State defense on a 20-yard touchdown pass, cutting the deficit to 10. After the two teams traded possessions, Ohio State got the ball back with 1:23 remaining in the first half. The Buckeyes drive did not start off as planned, as on the first play, Shillique Calhoun and Max Bullough combined for a sack which resulted in a loss of six. On the next play, Braxton Miller got the majority of that lost yardage back with a 15-yard run. With 13 seconds left in the half, after a Michigan State timeout, Miller completed a 38-yard pass to TE Jeff Heuerman to put Ohio State in good field goal position at the MSU 11 yard line. Senior kicker Drew Basil converted a 20-yard field goal attempt as time expired to bring the Buckeyes within a touchdown going into halftime, giving them momentum going into the second half in which they would receive the ball first. At the end of the first half, Michigan State led 17–10.

The physical running attack of Ohio State would be the theme of the third quarter, as Buckeye RB Carlos Hyde, who had been relatively quiet up until that point, started to gain traction. The duo of Hyde and Miller rushed for a combined 64 yards on the opening Ohio State possession of the second half, and Miller tied the game on an 11-yard rushing touchdown, making the score 17–17. On the ensuing Michigan State possession, Connor Cook threw only his fifth interception of the season (which would end up being the only turnover of the game), giving the ball back to the Ohio State offense with a short field. Despite this, the Spartan defense, who came into the game ranked No. 1 in total defense, got a critical stop, forcing Ohio State to punt the ball. The Buckeye defense then forced a three and out after the Ohio State special teams pinned the ball down at the MSU four yard line. After a decent return, Ohio State started their drive in MSU territory. Taking advantage of the short field, Carlos Hyde and Braxton Miller imposed their will again, as Miller scored his second rushing touchdown of the game from six yards out to give Ohio State a 24–17 lead. Desperately needing a score after 24 unanswered Ohio State points, the Michigan State offense took the field. On a drive that featured a huge 33-yard run by Jeremy Langford and a key conversion on fourth and two on an option run play, Michael Geiger kicked a 44-yard field goal to bring Michigan State within four points. The third quarter ended with Ohio State leading 24–20.

High drama ensued in the fourth quarter. After an Ohio State punt opened the quarter, the Michigan State offense went on an eight play, 90-yard drive that ended after Connor Cook completed a nine-yard touchdown pass to TE Josiah Price, who was wide open in the left side of the endzone. With the score, the Spartans took the lead back from Ohio State, 27–24. With under eight minutes remaining in the game, a Mike Sadler punt was partially blocked by Ryan Shazier (an All-Conference linebacker for the Buckeyes), which caused the punt to only net 19 yards. Braxton Miller and the Ohio State offense took over with 7:36 remaining at the MSU 47-yard line. Knowing they had to get a critical stop, the Michigan State defense stood tall, as on 4th and 2, Spartan linebacker Denicos Allen beat his blocker and prevented Braxton Miller from converting the first down on a speed option play. Michigan State took over on downs and, several plays later, Jeremy Langford put the game out of reach on a 26-yard touchdown run, giving Michigan State a 34–24 lead and became the first 100-yard rusher the Ohio State defense had allowed all season. Down 10 with 2:16 remaining, Ohio State failed to convert on 4th and 10 after four consecutive Braxton Miller incompletions. Michigan State took over on downs and ran out the clock, with the final score being 34–24.

Ohio State's dream of playing for a National Championship came to an end, as did their 24-game winning streak. Michigan State won their first outright Big Ten Championship since 1987 and secured their first Rose Bowl appearance in 26 years. Connor Cook was named MVP, throwing for a then career-high 304 yards, completing 24 of 40 passes and three touchdowns. Jeremy Langford rushed for over 100 yards rushing for the eighth straight game, breaking the school record for most consecutive 100 yard rushing games, a record set back in 1985 by MSU great Lorenzo White. He also finished the regular season leading the Big Ten in rushing touchdowns (17). This win also signified the first 12 win season in school history.

=== Stanford (Rose Bowl) ===
Stanford vs Michigan State
(Rose Bowl Game)

Team	1	2	3	4	Total
No. 5 Stanford	10	7	0	3	20
• No. 4 Michigan State	0	14	3	7	24

- Date: January 1st
- Location: Rose Bowl, Pasadena, CA
- Game start: 5:11
- Elapsed time: 3:19
- Game attendance: 95,173
- Game weather: 78° Wind 5 mph (8.0 km/h) S, Sunny
- Referee: Mike Defee
- TV announcers (ESPN/ESPN Radio):
  Brent Musburger (Play-by-Play)
  Kirk Herbstreit (Analyst)
  Heather Cox (Sideline)
  Tom Rinaldi (Sideline)
  Bill Rosinski (Play-by-Play)
  David Norrie (Analyst)
  Joe Schad (Sideline)

Scoring summary
1	11:16	Stan	Tyler Gaffney 16-yard run (Jordan Williamson kick)	Stan 7–0
1	01:40	Stan	Williamson 34-yard field goal	Stan 10–0
2	10:45	MSU	Jeremy Langford 2-yard run (Michael Geiger kick)	Stan 10–7
2	02:07	Stan	Kevin Anderson 40-yard interception return (Williamson kick)	Stan 17–7
2	00:28	MSU	Trevon Pendleton 2-yard pass from Connor Cook (Geiger kick)	Stan 17–14
3	12:56	MSU	Geiger 31-yard field goal	TIE 17–17
4	13:22	MSU	Tony Lippett 25-yard pass from Cook (Geiger kick)	MSU 24–17
4	04:15	Stan	Williamson 39-yard field goal	MSU 24–20

== Statistics ==
Passing

Note: Comp/Att = Completions/Attempts; Pct. = Completion percentage; Pass Rat. = Passer Rating

Player	Comp/Att	Pct.	Yards	TD	INT	Pass Rat.
Connor Cook	223/380	58.7	2755	22	6	135.5
Andrew Maxwell	15/33	45.5	114	0	0	74.5
Tyler O'Connor	9/14	64.3	90	0	0	118.3
Tony Lippett	1/2	50.0	5	1	0	236.0
Totals	248/430	57.7	2964	23	6	130.0

Rushing

Player	Att	Yards	Avg	Long	TD
Jeremy Langford	292	1422	4.9	44	18
Nick Hill	67	344	5.1	35	1
Delton Williams	38	238	6.3	42	1
R.J. Shelton	21	153	7.3	35	2
Riley Bullough	22	83	3.8	19	0
Connor Cook	69	76	1.1	20	1
Aaron Burbridge	4	62	15.5	35	0
Mike Sadler	2	28	14.0	25	0
Tyler O'Connor	8	24	3.0	10	0
Bennie Fowler	5	20	4.0	17	0
Nick Tompkins	6	16	2.7	6	0
Andrew Maxwell	3	13	4.3	8	0
Macgarrett Kings	3	6	2.0	7	0
Tony Lippett	1	3	3.0	3	0
Keith Mumphery	2	2	1.0	3	0
Totals	569	2433	4.3	44	23

Receiving

Player	Rec	Yards	Avg	Long	TD
Bennie Fowler	36	622	17.3	87	6
Tony Lippett	44	613	13.9	48	2
Macgarrett Kings	43	513	11.9	48	3
Keith Mumphery	18	299	16.6	72	3
Josiah Price	17	210	12.4	39	4
Aaron Burbridge	22	194	8.8	26	0
Jeremy Langford	28	157	5.6	24	1
Trevon Pendleton	8	127	15.9	49	2
Jamal Lyles	5	58	11.6	18	0
Andre Sims	7	55	7.9	20	1
Andrew Gleichert	6	49	8.2	18	1
Nick Hill	3	22	7.3	10	0
Delton Williams	2	13	6.5	9	0
Riley Bullough	3	11	3.7	7	0
Matt Macksood	1	8	8.0	8	0
DeAnthony Arnett	1	7	7.0	7	0
R.J. Shelton	4	6	1.5	7	0
Totals	248	2964	12.0	87	23

Kicking

Note: XPM = Extra point made; XPA = Extra point attempt; XP% = Extra point percentage; FGM = Field goal made; FGA = Field goal attempt; FG% = Field goal percentage; LNG = Longest make

Player	XPM	XPA	XP%	FGM	FGA	FG%	1–19	20–29	30–39	40–49	50+	LNG	Pts
Michael Geiger	36	38	94.7	15	16	93.8	0/0	3/3	4/5	8/8	0/0	49	81
Kevin Muma	12	13	92.3	4	6	66.7	0/0	3/4	1/2	0/0	0/0	30	24
Totals	48	51	94.1	19	22	86.4	0/0	6/7	5/7	8/8	0/0	49	105

Punting

Player	Punts	Yards	Avg	Yards/G
Mike Sadler	76	3233	42.54	230.9

Punt Returns

Player	Returns	Yards	Avg	TD
Macgarrett Kings	20	206	10.30	0
Andre Sims	15	129	8.60	0
Nick Hill	1	18	18.0	0
Totals	36	353	9.81	0

Kick Returns

Player	Returns	Yards	Avg	TD
R.J. Shelton	9	199	22.11	0
Nick Hill	5	95	19.0	0
Kyler Elsworth	1	18	18.0	0
Macgarrett Kings	1	16	16.0	0
Darrien Harris	1	14	14.0	0
Denzel Drone	1	3	3.0	0
Totals	18	345	19.17	0

Defense

Note: TT = Total tackles; Sol = Solo tackles; Ast = Assisted tackles; TFL = Tackles for loss; FF = Forced fumbles; FR = Fumble recoveries; PD = Passes defended; INT = Interceptions

Player	TT	Sol	Ast	TFL	Sacks	FF	FR	PD	INT	TD
Denicos Allen	98	45	53	16.5	5.5	1	1	1	0	1
Kurtis Drummond	93	51	42	3.5	0	1	1	5	4	1
Max Bullough	76	25	51	9.5	1.5	1	0	2	0	0
Tawain Jones	67	38	29	7.0	0	0	0	0	0	0
Darqueze Dennard	62	33	29	3.5	0	2	0	10	4	0
Isaiah Lewis	58	29	29	1.0	0	0	1	8	2	0
Trae Waynes	50	35	15	1.5	0	0	1	5	3	0
RJ Williamson	44	17	27	3.0	0	0	0	2	1	0
Shilique Calhoun	37	20	17	14.0	7.5	2	3	0	1	3
Micajah Reynolds	37	15	22	3.5	0	0	0	0	0	0
Tyler Hoover	31	10	21	4.5	4.0	2	0	2	0	0
Marcus Rush	30	13	17	7.5	5.0	1	0	3	0	0
Damon Knox	22	9	13	2.5	1.0	0	0	1	0	0
Ed Davis	17	8	9	4.0	4.0	0	0	0	0	0
Denzel Drone	17	5	12	5.0	2.5	0	1	1	0	0
Mark Scarpinato	15	4	11	1.0	1.0	0	0	2	0	0
Kyler Elsworth	14	5	9	1.5	0	0	0	1	0	0
Jarius Jones	12	5	7	1.0	0	0	0	0	2	0
Darrien Harris	12	4	8	0.5	0	0	0	0	0	0
Mark Meyers	9	6	3	0	0	0	0	0	0	0
Demetrius Cox	6	3	3	0	0	0	0	0	0	0
Jermaine Edmondson	6	3	3	0	0	0	0	0	0	0
Arjen Colquhoun	5	1	4	0	0	0	0	0	0	0
Mylan Hicks	3	1	2	0	0	0	0	0	0	0
Riley Bullough	3	1	2	0	0	0	0	0	0	0
Brandon Clemons	2	0	2	0.5	0	0	0	0	0	0
Darian Hicks	2	2	0	0	0	0	0	0	0	0
Ezra Robinson	2	2	0	0	0	0	0	0	0	0
Jeremy Langford	2	1	1	0	0	0	0	0	0	0
Lawrence Thomas	1	1	0	0	0	0	0	0	0	0
Taybor Pepper	1	1	0	0	0	0	0	0	0	0
Macgarrett Kings	1	1	0	0	0	0	0	0	0	0
Matt Macksood	1	1	0	0	0	0	0	0	0	0
Andre Sims	1	1	0	0	0	0	0	0	0	0
Mike Sadler	1	1	0	0	0	0	0	0	0	0
Tony Lippett	1	1	0	0	0	0	0	0	0	0
Trevon Pendleton	1	0	1	0	0	0	0	0	0	0
Andrew Gleichert	1	0	1	0	0	0	0	0	0	0
Jamal Lyles	1	0	1	0	0	0	0	0	0	0
Kevin Muma	1	0	1	0	0	0	0	0	0	0
Joel Heath	0	0	0	0	0	0	0	1	0	0
Total	843	398	445	91	32	10	8	44	17	5

== Roster ==
2013 Michigan State Spartans football team roster
Players
Coaches
Offense

Pos.	#	Name	Class
OL	66	Jack Allen	So
QB	22	Paul Andrie	Fr
WR	5	DeAnthony Arnett	Jr
WR	87	Tres Barksdale	Fr
G	57	Adam Brown	So
RB/DB	44	Corry Brown	Fr
RB/LB	30	Riley Bullough	Fr
WR	16	Aaron Burbridge	So
OT	70	Skyler Burkland	Jr
TE	80	Dylan Chmura	Fr
OL	76	Donavon Clark	So
OT	74	Jack Conklin	Fr
OL	77	Henry Conway	Sr
QB	18	Connor Cook	So
OT	65	Michael Dennis	Jr
OL	73	Dennis Finley	Fr
OT	51	Fou Fonoti	Sr
WR	13	Bennie Fowler	Sr
OL	59	Dan France	Sr
TE	92	Andrew Gleichert	Jr
FB	48	Ty Hamilton	Jr
G	67	Zach Higgins	Fr
RB	20	Nick Hill	Jr
TE	84	Derek Hoebing	Sr
RB	24	Gerald Holmes	Fr
C	63	Travis Jackson	Jr
WR	89	John Jakubik	Jr
TE	85	Evan Jones	Fr
OL	69	Shawn Kamm	Jr
C	79	Kodi Kieler	Fr
WR	17	Trey Kilgore	Fr
WR	3	Macgarrett Kings	So
G	54	Connor Kruse	Jr
TE	83	Paul Lang	So
RB	33	Jeremy Langford	Jr
C	53	Kyle Lints	So
WR	14	Tony Lippett	Jr
WR	86	Matt Macksood	Fr
WR	88	Monty Madaris	Fr
QB	10	Andrew Maxwell	Sr
G	75	Benny McGowan	Fr
WR	25	Keith Mumphery	Jr
QB	7	Tyler O’Connor	Fr
FB	38	Niko Palazeti	Jr
FB	37	Trevon Pendleton	So
TE	82	Josiah Price	Fr
FB	47	Matt Rea	Jr
RB	12	R.J. Shelton	Fr
WR	21	Andre Sims	So
QB	6	Damion Terry	Fr
RB	32	Nick Tompkins	Fr
G	64	Blake Treadwell (C)	Sr
WR	19	AJ Troup	So
QB	16	Tommy Vento	So
RB/LB	22	Delton Williams	Fr
TE	94	Tim Wojniak	Fr

Defense

Pos.	#	Name	Class
LB	28	Denicos Allen	Sr
CB	38	Gabe Augustin	Fr
DL	61	James Bodanis	Jr
LB	40	Max Bullough (C)	Sr
DE	89	Shilique Calhoun	So
DL	87	Brandon Clemons	So
DB	36	Arjen Colquhoun	So
DE	98	Demetrius Cooper	Fr
S	7	Demetrious Cox	Fr
LB	43	Ed Davis	So
CB	31	Darqueze Dennard (C)	Sr
DE	42	Denzel Drone	Sr
S	27	Kurtis Drummond	Jr
CB	39	Jermaine Edmondson	Fr
LB	41	Kyler Elsworth	Sr
DL	96	David Fennell	Fr
LB	19	Danny Folino	Sr
LB	50	Sean Harrington	Fr
LB	45	Darien Harris	So
DE	92	Joel Heath	So
CB	2	Darian Hicks	Fr
S	6	Mylan Hicks	Jr
DL	91	Tyler Hoover	Sr
LB/S	23	Jairus Jones	Sr
DL	94	Noah Jones	Fr
LB	49	Shane Jones	Fr
LB	34	Taiwan Jones	Jr
DL	99	James Kittredge	Jr
DL	93	Damon Knox	So
S	35	Chris Laneaux	So
DB	32	Zac Leimbach	Fr
S	9	Isaiah Lewis	Sr
DE	11	Jamal Lyles	Fr
DB	29	Mark Meyers	Fr
DB	20	Eli-Kevin Phillips	Fr
DB	35	Jalyn Powell	Fr
LB	33	Jon Reschke	Fr
DL	60	Micajah Reynolds	Sr
LB	48	Pat Rhomberg	So
CB	37	Ezra Robinson	Fr
DE	44	Marcus Rush	Jr
DT	55	Devyn Salmon	Fr
DL	97	Mark Scarpinato	So
DL	8	Lawrence Thomas	So
CB	15	Trae Waynes	So
CB	21	Justin Williams	Fr
S	26	RJ Williamson	So

Special teams

Pos.	#	Name	Class
K	24	Kevin Cronin	Fr
LS	56	Leland Ewing	Jr
K	9	Evan Fischer	Fr
K	4	Michael Geiger	Fr
LS	53	Steve Moore	Sr
K	17	Kevin Muma	Sr
LS	52	Taybor Pepper	So
P	3	Mike Sadler	Jr

Head coach

- Mark Dantonio

Coordinators/assistant coaches

- Pat Narduzzi – Defensive Coordinator
- Dave Warner – Co-Offensive Coordinator/Running Backs
- Jim Bollman – Co-Offensive Coordinator/Tight Ends
- Harlon Barnett – Secondary
- Ron Burton – Defensive Line
- Brad Salem – Quarterbacks/Recruiting Coordinator
- Terrence Samuel – Wide Receivers
- Mark Staten – Offensive Line
- Mike Tressel – Linebackers/Special Teams
- Rob Harley – Graduate assistant

Legend

- (C) Team captain
- (S) Suspended
- (I) Ineligible
- Injured
- Redshirt

Roster
Last update: August 20, 2013
