= Denicos Allen =

American football player (born 1990)

No. 28
- Position: Linebacker

Personal information
- Born: August 9, 1990 (age 36); Hamilton, Ohio, U.S.
- Listed height: 5 ft 11 in (1.80 m)
- Listed weight: 220 lb (100 kg)

Career information
- College: Michigan State
- NFL draft: 2014: undrafted

Career history
- Carolina Panthers (2014)*; St. Louis Rams (2014)*; Tampa Bay Buccaneers (2014)*; Winnipeg Blue Bombers (2015)*; Saskatchewan Roughriders (2015–2016)
- * Offseason or practice squad member only

Awards and highlights
- 2× Second-team All-Big Ten (2011, 2013)
- Stats at Pro Football Reference

Denicos Allen (born August 9, 1990) is an American former professional football player who was a linebacker for the Saskatchewan Roughriders of the Canadian Football League (CFL). He played college football for the Michigan State Spartans from 2010 to 2013, winning a Rose Bowl in 2013. After practice squad stints in the National Football League (NFL), he played in the CFL for Saskatchewan.

== College career ==
A native of Ohio, Allen played college football at Michigan State from 2010 to 2013, registering 278 total tackles. He helped lead the 2013 Michigan State Spartans football team to a Big Ten Conference championship and a victory over Stanford in the 2014 Rose Bowl.

== Professional career ==
Allen played in 4 preseason games for the Tampa Bay Buccaneers in 2014 before being cut. He was signed to their practice squad on November 25, 2014.

He played for the Saskatchewan Roughriders of the CFL in 2015, appearing in three games, two as a starter, and registering 17 tackles.
