= Kurtis Drummond =

American football player (born 1992)

No. 23, 40
- Position: Safety

Personal information
- Born: January 29, 1992 (age 34); Masury, Ohio, U.S.
- Listed height: 6 ft 1 in (1.85 m)
- Listed weight: 200 lb (91 kg)

Career information
- High school: Hubbard (Hubbard, Ohio)
- College: Michigan State
- NFL draft: 2015: undrafted

Career history
- Houston Texans (2015–2017); San Antonio Commanders (2019)

Awards and highlights
- Big Ten Defensive Back of the Year (2014); 2× First-team All-Big Ten (2013, 2014)

Career NFL statistics
- Total tackles: 34
- Sacks: 1.0
- Forced fumbles: 1
- Stats at Pro Football Reference

Kurtis Drummond (born January 29, 1992) is an American former professional football player who was a safety for the Houston Texans of the National Football League (NFL). He played college football for the Michigan State Spartans. Drummond played professionally for the Texans as well as the San Antonio Commanders of the Alliance of American Football (AAF).

== Early life ==
Drummond attended Hubbard High School in Hubbard, Ohio.

Considered a three-star recruit by ESPN.com, Drummond was listed as the No. 84 athlete in the nation in 2010. He committed to play college football at Michigan State University in October 2009.

== College career ==
Drummond was redshirted as a freshman in 2010 after tearing his labrum. Drummond played in 12 games as a backup to Trenton Robinson as a redshirt freshman in 2011. He finished the season with 17 tackles and two interceptions. As a sophomore in 2012 Drummond played in 12 games with seven starts. He recorded 53 tackles and two interceptions. Drummond was a first-team All-Big Ten selection as a junior in 2013 after recording 91 tackles and four interceptions. He again was first-team All-Big Ten as a senior after recording 72 tackles and four interceptions. He was also named a first-team All-American by the Football Writers Association of America (FWAA).

== Professional career ==
Pre-draft measurables
Height	Weight	Arm length	Hand span	40-yard dash	10-yard split	20-yard split	20-yard shuttle	Three-cone drill	Vertical jump	Broad jump	Bench press
6 ft 1 in (1.85 m)	208 lb (94 kg)	32 1/4 in (0.82 m)	10 3/8 in (0.26 m)	4.65 s	1.59 s	2.67 s	4.33 s	7.09 s	39 in (0.99 m)	9 ft 11 in (3.02 m)	22 reps
All values from NFL Combine

=== Houston Texans ===
Drummond was signed by the Houston Texans as an undrafted free agent on May 8, 2015. He was waived on September 5, 2017 and was re-signed to the practice squad. He was promoted to the active roster on October 27, 2015. He appeared in 9 games and made 14 tackles, primarily playing on special teams.

On August 30, 2016, Drummond was placed on injured reserve.

On October 4, 2017, Drummond was waived by the Texans and was re-signed to the practice squad. He was promoted back to the active roster on October 14, 2017.

On September 2, 2018, Drummond was waived by the Texans.

=== San Antonio Commanders ===
On January 4, 2019, Drummond signed with the San Antonio Commanders of the AAF. The league ceased operations in April 2019.

In 2019, Drummond was selected by the Dallas Renegades of the XFL in the second round of his position group in the 2020 XFL draft.
