= Hubbard, Ohio =

- City
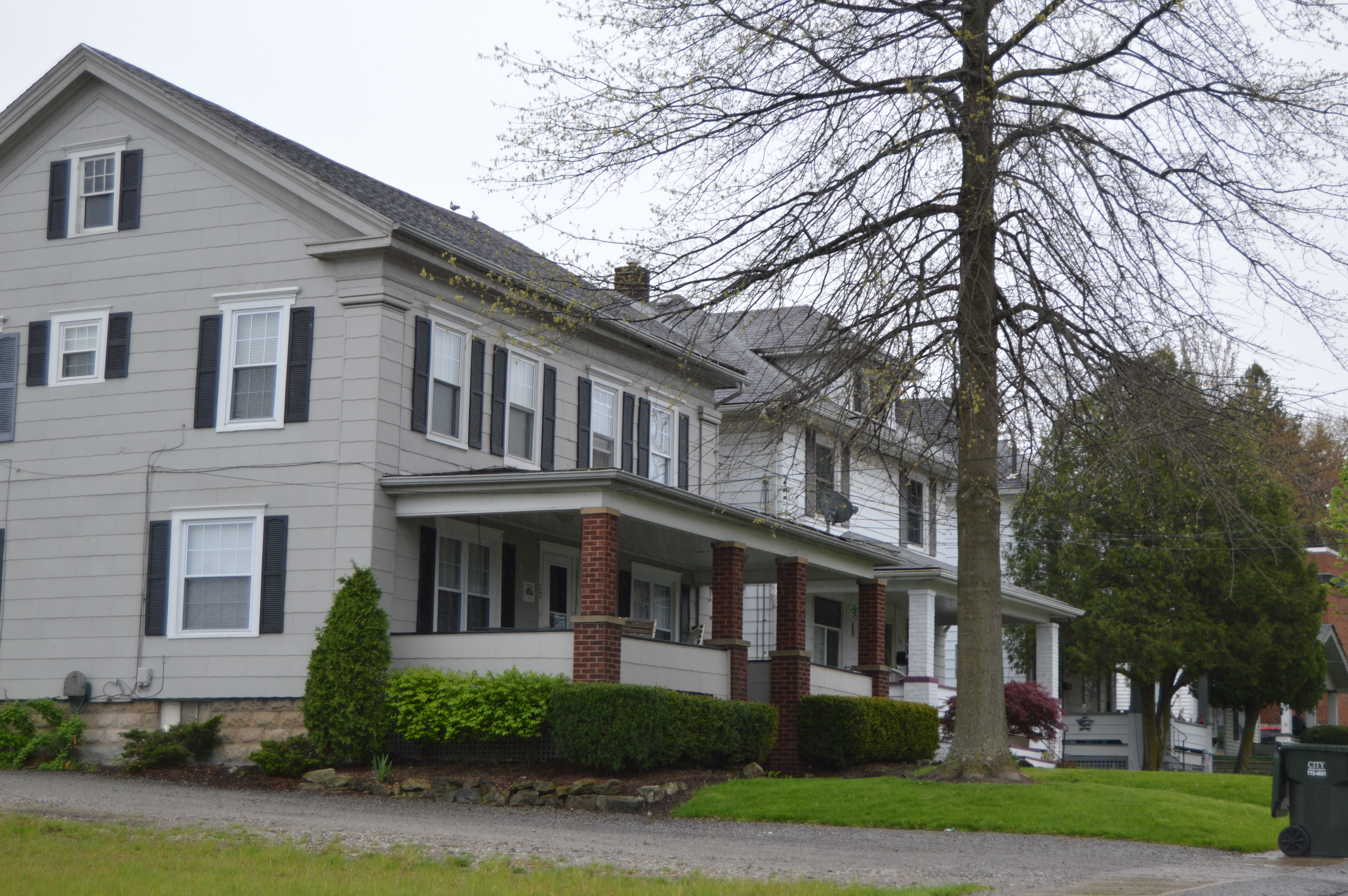
- Houses on Bentley Street

- Seal
- Motto: Where Opportunity Begins
- Interactive map of Hubbard, Ohio
- Location within Ohio Location within the United States
- Coordinates: 41°09′34″N 80°34′02″W
- Country: United States
- State: Ohio
- County: Trumbull
- Incorporated: 1868

Government
  - Mayor: Benjamin A. Kyle
  - President of Council: William J. Williams, Sr.

Area
  - Total: 4.03 sq mi (10.45 km^{2})
  - Land: 4.03 sq mi (10.43 km^{2})
  - Water: 0.0077 sq mi (0.02 km^{2})
- Elevation: 945 ft (288 m)

Population (2020)
  - Total: 7,636
  - Density: 1,895.5/sq mi (731.85/km^{2})
- Time zone: UTC-5 (Eastern (EST))
  - Summer (DST): UTC-4 (EDT)
- ZIP code: 44425
- Area codes: 330, 234
- FIPS code: 39-36582
- GNIS feature ID: 2394435
- Website: City website

Hubbard is a city in southeastern Trumbull County, Ohio, United States. It is formed from part of Hubbard Township, which was formed from the Connecticut Western Reserve. The population was 7,636 at the 2020 census. It is a suburb in the Youngstown–Warren metropolitan area.

== History ==
The village takes its name from Nehemiah Hubbard, Jr., a Connecticut Land Company agent from Middletown, Connecticut. Hubbard led a surveying party of which Samuel Tylee, also from Middletown, was a member. Tylee became the township's first settler in 1801, with his family. Many of the early settlers were farmers from New Jersey who cleared the forested area for crop production. A post office called Hubbard was established in 1826. Until 1861, Hubbard was a relatively small town, but the development of the local coal and iron industries rapidly developed the town over the decade. Hubbard was incorporated a village in 1868, with Nathaniel Mitchell serving as the first mayor.

== Geography ==
According to the United States Census Bureau, the city has a total area of 3.91 square miles (10.13 km^{2}), of which 3.90 square miles (10.10 km^{2}) is land and 0.01 square miles (0.03 km^{2}) is water. The city contains no major waterways; however, Mud Run and Little Yankee Run flow through the city limits.

== Demographics ==
Historical population
Census	Pop.	Note	%±
1870	1,126		—
1880	1,511		34.2%
1890	1,498		−0.9%
1900	1,230		−17.9%
1910	1,699		38.1%
1920	3,320		95.4%
1930	4,080		22.9%
1940	4,189		2.7%
1950	4,560		8.9%
1960	7,137		56.5%
1970	8,583		20.3%
1980	9,245		7.7%
1990	8,248		−10.8%
2000	8,284		0.4%
2010	7,874		−4.9%
2020	7,636		−3.0%
2025 (est.)	7,528		−1.4%

=== 2020 census ===
As of the 2020 census, Hubbard had a population of 7,636. The median age was 45.9 years. 18.3% of residents were under the age of 18 and 23.7% of residents were 65 years of age or older. For every 100 females there were 94.1 males, and for every 100 females age 18 and over there were 92.9 males age 18 and over.

99.2% of residents lived in urban areas, while 0.8% lived in rural areas.

There were 3,544 households in Hubbard, of which 23.5% had children under the age of 18 living in them. Of all households, 41.7% were married-couple households, 22.0% were households with a male householder and no spouse or partner present, and 29.8% were households with a female householder and no spouse or partner present. About 37.3% of all households were made up of individuals and 17.9% had someone living alone who was 65 years of age or older.

There were 3,758 housing units, of which 5.7% were vacant. The homeowner vacancy rate was 1.4% and the rental vacancy rate was 7.3%.

Racial composition as of the 2020 census
Race	Number	Percent
White	7,105	93.0%
Black or African American	176	2.3%
American Indian and Alaska Native	12	0.2%
Asian	35	0.5%
Native Hawaiian and Other Pacific Islander	1	0.0%
Some other race	45	0.6%
Two or more races	262	3.4%
Hispanic or Latino (of any race)	155	2.0%

=== 2010 census ===
As of the 2010 census of 2010, there were 7,874 people, 3,442 households, and 2,185 families living in the city. The population density was 2,019.0 inhabitants per square mile (779.5/km^{2}). There were 3,701 housing units at an average density of 949.0 per square mile (366.4/km^{2}). The racial makeup of the city was 96.5% White, 1.5% African American, 0.1% Native American, 0.3% Asian, 0.1% Pacific Islander, 0.3% from other races, and 1.2% from two or more races. Hispanic or Latino people of any race were 1.3% of the population.

There were 3,442 households, of which 26.7% had children under the age of 18 living with them, 46.7% were married couples living together, 12.1% had a female householder with no husband present, 4.7% had a male householder with no wife present, and 36.5% were non-families. 32.6% of all households were made up of individuals, and 15.2% had someone living alone who was 65 years of age or older. The average household size was 2.29 and the average family size was 2.90.

The median age in the city was 43.9 years. 20.3% of residents were under the age of 18; 8.7% were between the ages of 18 and 24; 22.3% were from 25 to 44; 29.6% were from 45 to 64; and 19.1% were 65 years of age or older. The gender makeup of the city was 47.6% male and 52.4% female.

=== 2000 census ===
As of the 2000 census of 2000, there were 8,284 people, 3,456 households, and 2,322 families living in the city. The population density was 2,402.3 inhabitants per square mile (927.5/km^{2}). There were 3,666 housing units at an average density of 1,063.1 per square mile (410.5/km^{2}). The racial makeup of the city was 98.08% White, 0.92% African American, 0.11% Native American, 0.14% Asian, 0.01% Pacific Islander, 0.14% from other races, and 0.59% from two or more races. Hispanic or Latino people of any race were 0.46% of the population.

There were 3,457 households, out of which 28.0% had children under the age of 18 living with them, 53.7% were married couples living together, 10.2% had a female householder with no husband present, and 32.8% were non-families. 30.0% of all households were made up of individuals, and 15.1% had someone living alone who was 65 years of age or older. The average household size was 2.40 and the average family size was 2.99.

In the city, the population was spread out, with 23.2% under the age of 18, 7.6% from 18 to 24, 26.2% from 25 to 44, 24.7% from 45 to 64, and 18.3% who were 65 years of age or older. The median age was 40 years. For every 100 females, there were 89.7 males. For every 100 females age 18 and over, there were 85.1 males.

The median income for a household in the city was $34,657, and the median income for a family was $42,077. Males had a median income of $34,572 versus $25,052 for females. The per capita income for the city was $19,838. About 5.3% of families and 8.6% of the population were below the poverty line, including 15.4% of those under age 18 and 4.8% of those age 65 or over.

== Education ==
Public education in the city is managed by the Hubbard Exempted Village School District, which operates three schools:

- Hubbard Elementary School
- Hubbard Middle School
- Hubbard High School

== Notable people ==
- Cyrus Bussey, Union Army brigadier general during the American Civil War and member of the Iowa Senate
- Capri Cafaro, member of the Ohio Senate from the 32nd district
- Al Campana, professional American football running back
- Michael Del Bane, member of the Ohio House of Representatives from the 56th district
- Kurtis Drummond, American football safety
- Rudy Hubbard, head football coach of Florida A&M University 1974–1985
- Phil Keaggy, musician, guitarist, CCM artist
- Patrick McGunigal, Medal of Honor recipient
- Emerson Opdycke, Union Army brigadier general during the American Civil War
- Anthony Smith, professional football player for the Green Bay Packers
- Jimmy Weller III, professional stock car racing driver
