= Randy Gregory =

American football player (born 1992)

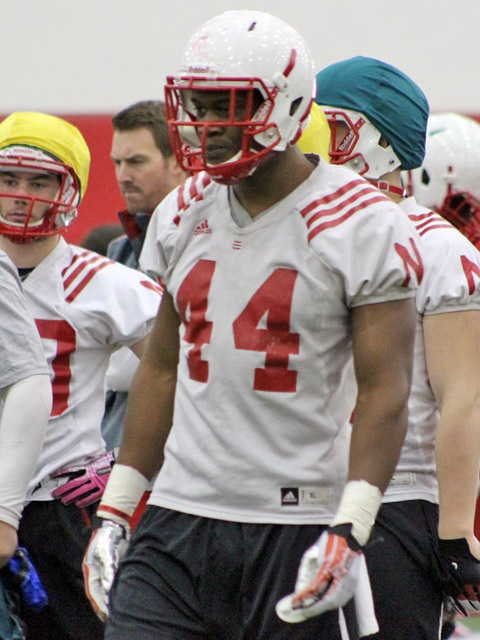
- Gregory with the Nebraska Cornhuskers in 2014

No. 94, 5
- Position: Linebacker

Personal information
- Born: November 23, 1992 (age 33); Jacksonville, Florida, U.S.
- Listed height: 6 ft 5 in (1.96 m)
- Listed weight: 242 lb (110 kg)

Career information
- High school: Hamilton Southeastern (Fishers, Indiana)
- College: Arizona Western (2011–2012); Nebraska (2013–2014)
- NFL draft: 2015: 2nd round, 60th overall pick

Career history
- Dallas Cowboys (2015–2021); Denver Broncos (2022–2023); San Francisco 49ers (2023); Tampa Bay Buccaneers (2024)*
- * Offseason or practice squad member only

Awards and highlights
- Third-team All-American (2014); 2× First-team All-Big Ten (2013, 2014)

Career NFL statistics
- Total tackles: 117
- Sacks: 22.0
- Forced fumbles: 10
- Fumble recoveries: 2
- Interceptions: 1
- Stats at Pro Football Reference

Randy Gregory (born November 23, 1992) is an American former professional football player who was a linebacker in the National Football League (NFL). He played college football for the Nebraska Cornhuskers, and was selected by the Dallas Cowboys in the second round of the 2015 NFL draft.

== Early life ==
Gregory was born in Jacksonville, Florida, and moved seven times during childhood. His father, Ken Gregory, played college football at Northwestern. He attended Hamilton Southeastern High School in Fishers, Indiana, where he was a two-sport athlete in football and basketball.

In football, he posted 92 tackles and 17 sacks. Following his senior season, he was ranked as one of the top 15 players in the state of Indiana. In addition to numerous scholarship offers in football, Gregory also drew some interest from Division I basketball teams.

== College career ==
Gregory committed to Purdue University out of high school, but he was academically ineligible, ultimately being offered by Purdue to either attend Arizona Western College or Iowa Western Community College. Gregory decided to enroll at Arizona Western. He broke his wrist playing basketball, but became a starter for their football team after showing them what he was capable of. As a freshman in 2011, he had 82 tackles, nine sacks, 21 tackles for loss, 3 forced fumbles and 2 fumble recoveries. He helped the team reach the NJCAA title game, but it ended in a loss.

As a sophomore for Arizona Western in 2012, he missed the entire season due to a broken fibula in a practice after their first game. Although he committed to Purdue, the head coach Gregory hoped to play under, Danny Hope, was let go, and he wasn't impressed with how their team played at that time. Meanwhile, as a result of his injury, the University of Nebraska-Lincoln was the only college to reach out to Gregory in his sophomore year. He ultimately decided to de-commit from Purdue and attend Nebraska instead.

As a sophomore for Nebraska in 2013, he started 10-of-13 games, recording 66 tackles (19 for loss), 10.5 sacks, 18 quarterback hurries, one pass defensed, one forced fumble, one fumble recovery and one interception that he returned for a touchdown. His 10.5 sacks led the Big Ten Conference. For his efforts, Gregory was named a 2013 first-team All-Big Ten selection and rewarded with Nebraska's Defensive MVP.

Sporting News listed Gregory as their preseason number 5 player in college football for 2014. As a junior, he started 10 out of 11 games, while making 54 tackles (fifth on the team), 10 tackles for loss (third on the team), 7 sacks (led the team), 16 quarterback hurries, one interception, 3 passes defended, one forced fumble and 2 blocked kicks. He had missed their second game that season against Fresno State University with an injury.

Gregory decided to forgo his senior season and entered the 2015 NFL draft.

=== College statistics ===
Season	Class	GP	Tackles					Interceptions					Fumbles			
Season	Class	GP	Cmb	Solo	Ast	TfL	Sck	Int	Yds	Lng	TD	PD	FF	FR	Yds	TD
2013	SO	13	66	40	26	19.0	10.5	1	33	33	0	1	1	1	0	0
2014	JR	11	54	23	31	10.0	7.0	1	0	0	0	3	1	0	0	0
Career		24	120	63	57	29.0	17.5	2	33	33	0	4	2	1	0	0

== Professional career ==
=== Pre-draft ===
Pre-draft measurables
Height	Weight	Arm length	Hand span	Wingspan	40-yard dash	10-yard split	20-yard split	20-yard shuttle	Three-cone drill	Vertical jump	Broad jump	Bench press	Wonderlic
6 ft 4 7/8 in (1.95 m)	235 lb (107 kg)	34 in (0.86 m)	10 in (0.25 m)	6 ft 9 7/8 in (2.08 m)	4.64 s	1.61 s	2.71 s	4.23 s	6.80 s	36.5 in (0.93 m)	10 ft 5 in (3.18 m)	24 reps	28
All values from NFL Combine/Pro Day

As early as May 2014, Gregory was projected as a high first round selection in the 2015 NFL Draft by various mock drafts. However, after testing positive for marijuana in the 2015 NFL Scouting Combine drug test, he was looked over during the first round of the draft.

=== Dallas Cowboys ===
==== 2015 ====
Gregory fell heavily to the second round, until being selected by the Dallas Cowboys (60th overall). He became the first player to have played at Arizona Western to get drafted.

In 2015, he showed promise in the preseason (three sacks in three games.) However, in the season opener against New York Giants (three quarterback pressures in only 18 snaps), he suffered a high ankle sprain in the fourth quarter that forced him to miss the next four games. He made his return to the field in Week 7 against the Giants; however, it wasn't until the team's Week 10 loss to the Tampa Bay Buccaneers that Gregory posted his first professional tackle, making one solo and one assisted tackle in the game. He didn't have a sack during the season, but still managed 16 quarterback pressures (ranked fourth on the team) and one tackle-for-loss.

==== 2016–2017 ====
On February 19, 2016, Gregory was suspended for the first four games of the season due to violating the league's substance abuse policy. On September 29, Gregory was reported to have failed a second drug test, just after leaving an undisclosed treatment facility earlier that month, and was removed from the team's roster. This caused him an additional 10-game suspension, making him ineligible to return to the Cowboys until December 19.

On November 11, it was reported that Gregory failed a third drug test and was facing a policy-mandated year-long suspension, added on to his on-going 14-game suspension.

Gregory was activated from his consecutive suspensions on December 26, prior to a Week 16 matchup against the Detroit Lions. His year-long suspension was not in place at the time, so he was able to make his 2016 season debut, while the Cowboys released DE Zach Moore for Gregory. In the game, he told the coaching staff he was able to play through an oblique strain he suffered in the first quarter, and went on to post two tackles and one quarterback hurry. With the team suffering multiple injuries along the defensive line, he started in the last game of the season, a 27–13 loss to the Philadelphia Eagles. He recorded his first career sack, as well as one tackle/"stuff" for a 4-yard loss, and a quarterback hurry. In that game, he made the second-most tackles (seven) on the team, only bested by fellow LB Damien Wilson by 1 tackle (eight total.)

Despite the possibility that the NFL would delay the appeal hearing for his latest suspension and allow him to play in the postseason, the meeting was held on January 3, 2017. On January 5, the league officially announced that Gregory would be suspended for the 2016–17 NFL postseason, and at least one season, with the reasoning that Gregory allegedly missed a scheduled drug test.

==== 2018 ====
On July 17, 2018, after missing the entire 2017 season, Gregory was reinstated by the NFL on a conditional basis. This allowed him to report to training camp and participate in meetings, but he was not permitted to participate in games or practices until he showed a plan to stay clean. Up until this moment, he was not allowed to have any communication with the Cowboys organization. On July 23, he was fully reinstated and cleared by the league to practice and play in games. On August 30, he met with the NFL's chief medical director, in what was reported to be a proactive meeting, to discuss his treatment and progress. On September 9, it was reported by Adam Schefter that Gregory suffered a substance abuse relapse during the month of August. This information came after the Cowboys' season-opener against the Carolina Panthers, in which Gregory suffered a game-ending concussion in the second quarter. However, he went on to play in 14 games that season, making a total of 22 tackles, 6 sacks, 2 forced fumbles with 1 fumble recovery, and 2 total tackles/"stuffs" for a combined loss of 3 yards.

==== 2019 ====
On February 26, 2019, Gregory was suspended indefinitely by the NFL, for again violating the league's substance abuse policy, as well as reneging on the terms of his conditional reinstatement, from an incident that occurred on New Year's Day 2019. On April 2, the Cowboys extended Gregory's contract through the 2020 season. However, this extension was later blocked due to the terms of the 2020 collective bargaining agreement, as well as the league ruling that players under suspension cannot be given new contracts.

==== 2020 ====
On March 22, 2020, ESPN reported that Gregory filed for reinstatement with the NFL, which gave the NFL 60 days to make a decision. The Cowboys had lost sack leader Robert Quinn to the Chicago Bears in the off-season and needed a player like Gregory to fill that spot. On September 4, Gregory was conditionally reinstated from suspension, and the Cowboys were given a roster exemption to retain him through the first six games of the season. This meant he would not be counted towards the 53-man roster until being cleared in Week 6. On September 8, he signed a one-year extension. He was activated from the roster exemption on October 20.

In Week 7, he made his season debut against the Washington Football Team. In Week 12, on November 26 (Thanksgiving), he recorded his first career multi-sack game, with two sacks on quarterback Alex Smith during their 41–16 loss to the Washington Football Team. He led the team in sacks for that game. That season, Gregory appeared in 10 games, making plays in 9 of them, registering 21 total tackles (4 for yardage loss, 15 solo), 3.5 sacks (tied for third on the team), 12 quarterback hurries, one pass deflected and three forced fumbles (all three fumbles were from their Week 16 game against the Eagles.) In that game, he also had three tackles, 1.5 sacks, two quarterback hurries/hits, and one pass defended. Despite playing only in the second half of the season, he played right defensive end, taking time away from starter Aldon Smith.

==== 2021 ====
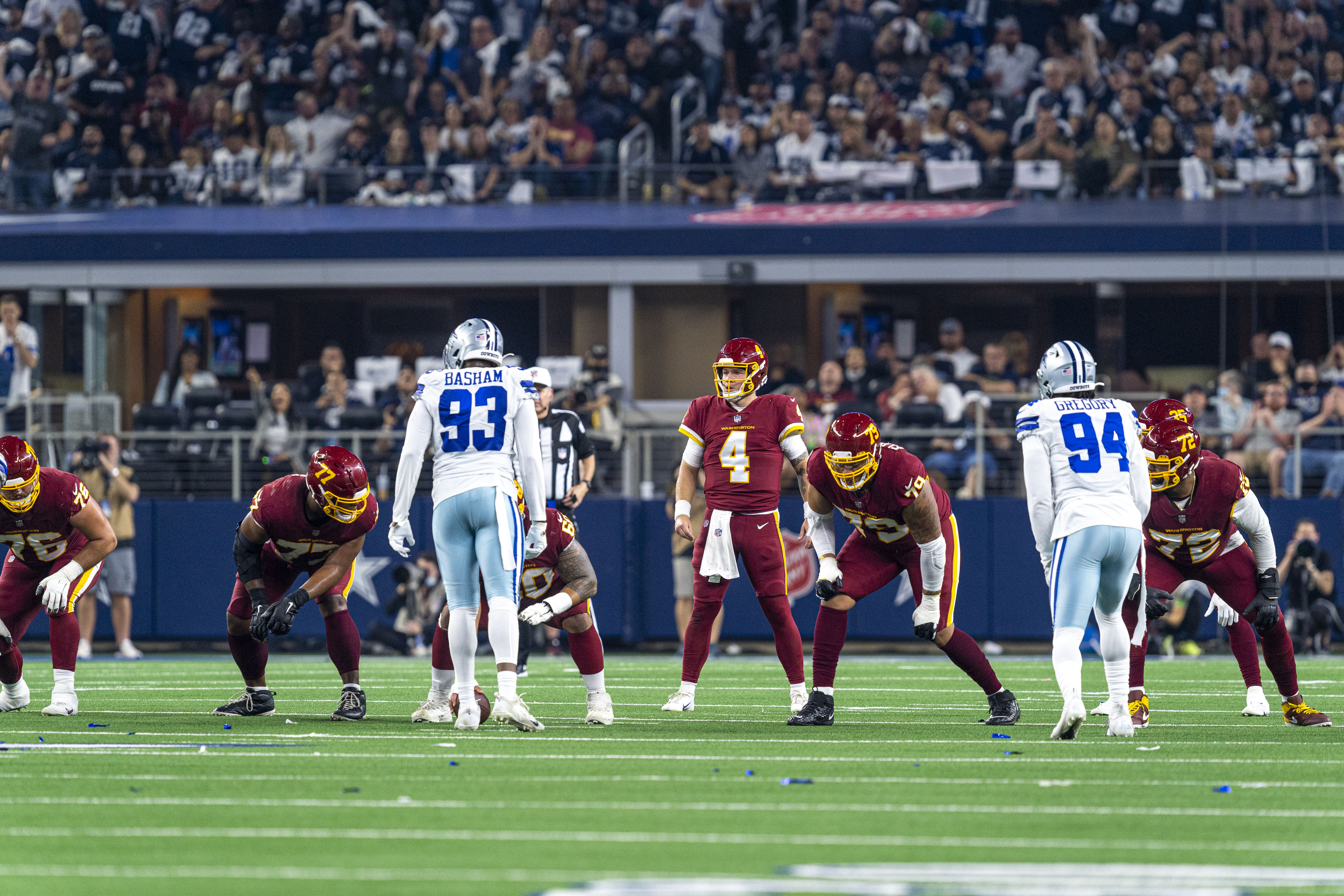
Gregory (#94) playing for the Cowboys in 2021.

Gregory entered the 2021 season as a starting defensive end for the Cowboys. He went on to play in seven games, racking up 5 sacks (tied for team lead with fellow LB Micah Parsons), 10 combined tackles, 3 tackles for loss/"stuffs," 12 quarterback hits, 20 quarterback pressures (led team), 2 forced fumbles and one un-related fumble recovery. However, he suffered a calf injury during practice before Week 10 and was placed on injured reserve on November 11, being expected to miss three games. His current teammates were thought to fill in his spot, while the staff reported they were not looking for free agents. He was activated on December 11. On December 12, against the Washington Football Team, he recorded a sack, a forced fumble, and his first career interception, on a pass that he both deflected at the line and caught, returning it for 12 yards. He finished the 2021 season with six sacks, 19 total tackles, one interception, one pass defended, and three forced fumbles, playing in 12 games with 11 starts.

=== Denver Broncos ===
==== 2022 ====
During free agency, on March 15, 2022, it was reported that Gregory had signed a five-year contract extension with the Cowboys. However, there was a disagreement in the contract language that allowed the Cowboys to claim any bonuses if a player is fined or suspended. This led Gregory to leave Dallas and sign a five-year, $70 million contract with the Denver Broncos on March 18.

He suffered a knee injury in the fourth quarter of their Week 4 game against the Las Vegas Raiders, and was placed on injured reserve on October 4. He was eligible to return in their game against the Tennessee Titans in Week 10. However, he was activated on December 17, for their Week 15 game against the Arizona Cardinals. He was to be suspended for one game on December 26, following a post–game fight with Los Angeles Rams guard Oday Aboushi after Denver lost 51–14. However, his suspension was overturned a day later, being reduced to a $50,000 fine for initiating the fight. Gregory apologized for his actions. He finished the season with two sacks, 12 tackles, and two forced fumbles through six games.

==== 2023 ====
In his ten games with the Broncos, Gregory recorded a total of three sacks. For their Week 4 game of the 2023 season against the Bears, the Broncos decided not to start him for the first time that season. Following their win over the Bears, the Broncos' new head coach, Sean Payton, had noticed that his younger teammates, linebackers Nik Bonitto (2.5 sacks and a forced fumble in Week 4) and Jonathon Cooper (returned Bonitto's forced fumble for a touchdown in the Week 4 game), had been playing more effectively than Gregory as of late, prompting the team to part ways with him.

=== San Francisco 49ers ===
On October 6, 2023, despite initial reports that the Broncos intended to release him, Denver traded Gregory to the San Francisco 49ers, along with their 2024 NFL draft seventh-round pick, in exchange for a 2024 sixth-round pick. Gregory played in Super Bowl LVIII, a 25–22 overtime loss to the Chiefs.

=== Tampa Bay Buccaneers ===
On April 3, 2024, Gregory signed with the Tampa Bay Buccaneers for a one-year contract. However, he did not show up for Organized Team Activities (OTAs) or the mandatory June minicamp. He started accumulating fines when he did not show up for training camp. On August 18, the Buccaneers reached an agreement to release him with no pay.

== NFL career statistics ==
Legend
**Bold**	Career high

Year	Team	Games		Tackles				Interceptions						Fumbles	
Year	Team	GP	GS	Cmb	Solo	Ast	Sck	Int	Yds	Avg	Lng	TD	PD	FF	FR
2015	DAL	12	0	11	7	4	0.0	0	0	0.0	0	0	0	0	0
2016	DAL	2	0	9	8	1	1.0	0	0	0.0	0	0	0	0	0
2018	DAL	**14**	1	**25**	**19**	**6**	**6.0**	0	0	0.0	0	0	0	2	**1**
2020	DAL	10	0	21	15	**6**	3.5	0	0	0.0	0	0	**1**	**3**	0
2021	DAL	12	**11**	19	15	4	**6.0**	**1**	**12**	**12.0**	**12**	0	**1**	**3**	**1**
2022	DEN	6	3	12	7	5	2.0	0	0	0.0	0	0	0	2	0
2023	DEN	4	3	9	4	5	1.0	0	0	0.0	0	0	**1**	0	0
2023	SF	1	0	3	3	0	1.0	0	0	0.0	0	0	0	0	0
Career		61	18	109	78	31	20.5	1	12	12.0	12	0	3	10	2

== Personal life ==
Gregory has a daughter, Sophia, born in fall 2016 and a son, Roman in 2019.
