= Shilique Calhoun =

American football player (born 1992)

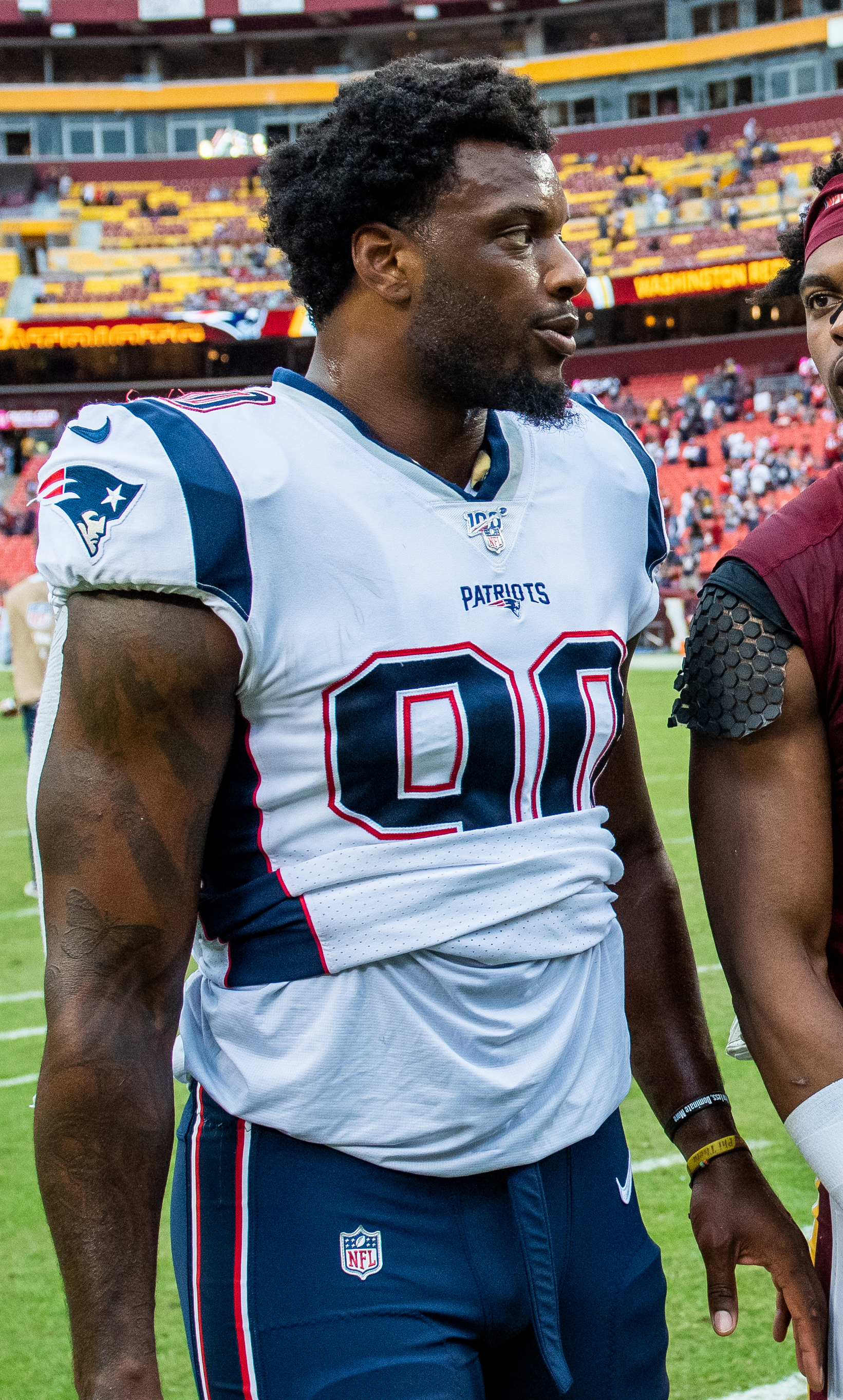
- Calhoun with the New England Patriots in 2019

No. 91, 90
- Position: Linebacker

Personal information
- Born: March 20, 1992 (age 34); Middletown Township, New Jersey, U.S.
- Listed height: 6 ft 5 in (1.96 m)
- Listed weight: 260 lb (118 kg)

Career information
- High school: Middletown North
- College: Michigan State
- NFL draft: 2016: 3rd round, 75th overall pick

Career history
- Oakland Raiders (2016–2018); New England Patriots (2019–2020); San Francisco 49ers (2021)*; Kansas City Chiefs (2021–2022)*
- * Offseason or practice squad member only

Awards and highlights
- 3× First-team All-Big Ten (2013–2015); Big Ten Defensive Lineman of the Year (2013)

Career NFL statistics
- Total tackles: 56
- Sacks: 2.5
- Forced fumbles: 3
- Stats at Pro Football Reference

Shilique Calhoun (born March 20, 1992) is an American former professional football player who was a linebacker in the National Football League (NFL). He played college football for the Michigan State Spartans, and was selected by the Oakland Raiders in the third round in the 2016 NFL draft.

== Early life ==
Calhoun attended Middletown High School North in Middletown Township, New Jersey. He was a defensive end and tight end for the high school football team. He also played basketball.

== College career ==
Calhoun was redshirted at Michigan State University as a freshman in 2011.

As a redshirt freshman in 2012, he played in all 13 games as a backup. He recorded 6 tackles (2.5 for a loss, including 1 sack) and 2 passes defensed. His first year as starter, as a sophomore in 2013, he posted 37 tackles (14 for a loss, including 7.5 sacks), 1 interception, 4 fumble recoveries, and 2 forced fumbles. He was named a second team All-American by numerous publications and was a finalist for the Ted Hendricks Award. Although he was eligible for the 2014 NFL draft, he decided to return for his junior season. During his junior year in 2014, he posted 39 tackles (12.5 for a loss, including 8 sacks), 1 fumble recovery, and a forced fumble. He was expected to leave college and enter the 2015 NFL draft, but he returned to school for his senior year and, during the 2015 season, he collected 49 tackles (15 for a loss, including 10.5 sacks), 3 passes defensed, and a forced fumble. He finished his four-year college career with 27 sacks, 131 tackles (44 tackles for a loss), four forced fumbles, five fumble recoveries, and one interception.

== Professional career ==
Pre-draft measurables
Height	Weight	Arm length	Hand span	40-yard dash	20-yard shuttle	Three-cone drill	Vertical jump	Broad jump	Bench press
6 ft 4 3/8 in (1.94 m)	251 lb (114 kg)	34 1/4 in (0.87 m)	9 7/8 in (0.25 m)	4.82 s	4.25 s	6.97 s	35.0 in (0.89 m)	9 ft 7 in (2.92 m)	23 reps
All values from NFL Combine

=== Oakland Raiders ===
On April 29, 2016, Calhoun was selected in the third round (75th overall) of the 2016 NFL draft. On May 17, it was announced that Calhoun would wear number 91, formerly held by Justin Tuck. On June 17, Calhoun signed with the Oakland Raiders. He played in 10 games as a rookie recording nine tackles and a pass defensed before being placed on injured reserve on December 23.

On September 2, 2017, Calhoun was waived by the Raiders and was re-signed to the practice squad the following day. He was promoted to the active roster on October 14.

On September 12, 2018, Calhoun was waived by the Raiders and was subsequently re-signed to the practice squad. He was promoted back to the active roster on September 18. Calhoun was placed on injured reserve on December 5.

=== New England Patriots ===
On May 2, 2019, Calhoun was signed by the New England Patriots.

On March 24, 2020, Calhoun was re-signed by the Patriots. In Week 2 against the Seattle Seahawks on Sunday Night Football, Calhoun recorded his first career sack on Russell Wilson during the 35–30 loss. He was placed on injured reserve on November 14. Calhoun was activated on December 19.

=== San Francisco 49ers ===
On August 10, 2021, Calhoun signed a one-year contract with the San Francisco 49ers. He was released by San Francisco on August 24.

=== Kansas City Chiefs ===
On October 19, 2021, Calhoun was signed to the Kansas City Chiefs' practice squad. He was released on January 18, 2022.

On February 9, 2022, Calhoun signed a reserve/future contract with Kansas City. He was waived by the Chiefs on August 8.
