= Hubbard High School (Ohio) =

Location
- 350 Hall Avenue; Hubbard, Ohio 44425; United States; 41°09′08″N 80°34′56″W

Information
- Type: Public
- Established: 1870
- School district: Hubbard Exempted Village School District
- NCES School ID: 390454202209
- Principal: Brandilyn Yobe
- Teaching staff: 40.50 (FTE)
- Grades: 9–12
- Enrollment: 548 (2024–25)
- Student to teacher ratio: 13.53
- Campus size: 66.8 acres (27.0 ha)
- Campus type: Rural
- Colors: Blue and white
- Athletics conference: Northeast 8 Athletic Conference
- Team name: Eagles
- Accreditation: Ohio Department of Education
- Newspaper: The Hub
- Yearbook: The Bard
- Website: www.hubbard.k12.oh.us/o/hhs

Hubbard High School is a public high school in Hubbard, Ohio, United States. It is the only high school in the Hubbard Exempted Village School District. Athletic teams are known as the Eagles, and they compete as a member of the Ohio High School Athletic Association in the Northeast 8 Athletic Conference.

== History ==
Hubbard High School was established in 1870 with the opening of a separate high school building. By 1873, it was incorporated into the township or "union" school. In 1920, HHS moved to a new building on Orchard Street SE, which served as home of HHS until 1954 and later served as Roosevelt Elementary School until 2011.

Hubbard High School moved to its current campus on Hall Avenue SE in 1954 with the completion of a new building. An elementary building opened on the campus in 1960, and this building became Reed Middle School in 1970, followed by construction of the Hubbard Community Pool, which opened in 1975.

The current high school building opened in 2010 and was the first phase of a multi-year $55 million project to bring all grades to the same campus and be in a single K–12 building, while also incorporating the existing pool. After the current HHS opened, the 1954 building was razed, though the auditorium was retained and incorporated into the new building. Hubbard Elementary followed in 2011, and Hubbard Middle School, built on the site of the 1954 HHS building, opened in 2013, connecting the high school and elementary school. The Reed Middle School building was razed after the completion of the new middle school, and the site was used for a new softball field and parking.

== Athletics ==
Hubbard High School currently offers:

- Baseball
- Basketball
- Bowling
- Cheerleading
- Cross country
- Golf
- Football
- Soccer
- Softball
- Swimming
- Track and field
- Volleyball
- Wrestling

=== Facilities ===
==== Hubbard Athletic Complex ====
The Hubbard Athletic Complex includes a softball field, baseball field, and an all-weather track and field complex. The Hubbard Community Pool is available for both members of the community and the Hubbard swim team to use. The pool facility is connected to the school but cannot be accessed through the school. The pool can be configured in two ways to allow multiple events to occur in the pool simultaneously.

The track & field complex, located on the northern end of the campus, once hosted the Hubbard home soccer games prior to the reconstruction of Memorial Stadium. The complex is lighted with bleachers for fans on the hill. A restroom facility is located on the southeast side of the complex and is open during sporting events.

==== Hubbard Memorial Stadium ====
Home football, boys' soccer, and girls' soccer games are played at Alumni Field at Hubbard Memorial Stadium on Rebecca Avenue SE, a few blocks northeast of the Hubbard K–12 campus. The stadium capacity is 5,000 people and contains a 2-story press box on the home side stands. In 2013, the stadium was modernized with artificial turf. A covered bandstand, known as the "Band Shell" was constructed in the south end of the stadium for the school's marching band, the Musical Pride of Hubbard. Prior to the modernization, the stadium had a grass field, and the marching band had bleachers behind the north end zone.

==== State championships ====
- Boys golf – 1971

==== Associated Press poll winners ====
- Football – 2014
