= 2013 Nebraska Cornhuskers football team =

American college football season

2013 Nebraska Cornhuskers football

Gator Bowl champion

Gator Bowl, W 24–19 vs. Georgia
- Conference: Big Ten Conference
- Legends Division

Ranking
- Coaches: No. 25
- Record: 9–4 (5–3 Big Ten)
- Head coach: Bo Pelini (6th season)
- Offensive coordinator: Tim Beck (3rd season)
- Offensive scheme: Spread
- Defensive coordinator: John Papuchis (2nd season)
- Base defense: 4–3
- Home stadium: Memorial Stadium

2013 Big Ten Conference football standings
	Conf.			Overall
Team	W		L	W		L
Legends Division
No. 3 Michigan State x$	8	–	0	13	–	1
Iowa	5	–	3	8	–	5
Nebraska	5	–	3	9	–	4
Minnesota	4	–	4	8	–	5
Michigan	3	–	5	7	–	6
Northwestern	1	–	7	5	–	7
Leaders Division
No. 12 Ohio State x%	8	–	0	12	–	2
No. 22 Wisconsin	6	–	2	9	–	4
Penn State*	4	–	4	7	–	5
Indiana	3	–	5	5	–	7
Illinois	1	–	7	4	–	8
Purdue	0	–	8	1	–	11
Championship: Michigan State 34, Ohio State 24
$ – BCS representative as conference champion; % – BCS at-large representative; x – Division champion/co-champions; Penn State ineligible for conference championship game and post-season bowl games due to NCAA sanctions; Rankings from AP Poll

The 2013 Nebraska Cornhuskers football team represented the University of Nebraska in the 2013 NCAA Division I FBS football season. The team was coached by Bo Pelini and played their home games at Memorial Stadium in Lincoln, Nebraska.

== Before the season ==
=== Recruiting ===
==== Scholarship recruits ====
College recruiting
Name	Hometown	School	Height	Weight	40^{‡}	Commit date
Banderas, Josh; LB	Lincoln, NE	Southwest	6 ft 2 in (1.88 m)	220 lb (100 kg)	4.65	Apr 12, 0202
Banderas, Josh; LB	Recruit ratings: Rivals: ESPN: (81)					
Carter, Cethan; TE/FB	Metairie, LA	Rummel	6 ft 4 in (1.93 m)	230 lb (100 kg)	4.8	Jan 17, 2013
Carter, Cethan; TE/FB	Recruit ratings: Rivals: ESPN: (74)					
Collins, Maliek; DT	Kansas City, MO	Center	6 ft 2 in (1.88 m)	285 lb (129 kg)	4.83	Jan 6, 2013
Collins, Maliek; DT	Recruit ratings: Rivals: ESPN: (79)					
Dixon, Tre’vell; ATH	Baldwin, LA	West St. Mary	6 ft 1 in (1.85 m)	195 lb (88 kg)	4.48	Feb 6, 2013
Dixon, Tre’vell; ATH	Recruit ratings: Rivals: ESPN: (82)					
Finnin, Matt; OL	Crete, IL	DuPage	6 ft 8 in (2.03 m)	330 lb (150 kg)	N/A	Jan 20, 2013
Finnin, Matt; OL	Recruit ratings: Rivals: ESPN: (76)					
Gerry, Nathan; S/ATH	Sioux Falls, SD	Washington	6 ft 2 in (1.88 m)	206 lb (93 kg)	4.42	Jun 6, 2012
Gerry, Nathan; S/ATH	Recruit ratings: Rivals: ESPN: (76)					
Gladney, Kevin; WR	Akron, OH	Firestone	6 ft 1 in (1.85 m)	175 lb (79 kg)	4.53	Jun 11, 2012
Gladney, Kevin; WR	Recruit ratings: Rivals: ESPN: (75)					
Gregory, Randy; DE	Fishers, IN	Ariz. Western	6 ft 6 in (1.98 m)	230 lb (100 kg)	N/A	Nov 1, 2012
Gregory, Randy; DE	Recruit ratings: Rivals: ESPN: (84)					
Hannon, Zach; OL	Kansas City, MO	Rockhurst	6 ft 5 in (1.96 m)	295 lb (134 kg)	N/A	Aug 8, 2012
Hannon, Zach; OL	Recruit ratings: Rivals: ESPN: (77)					
Hart, Greg; TE	Dayton, OH	Archbishop Alter	6 ft 5 in (1.96 m)	225 lb (102 kg)	4.63	May 16, 2012
Hart, Greg; TE	Recruit ratings: Rivals: ESPN: (76)					
Johnson, Dwayne; OL	Houston, TX	Bellaire	6 ft 6 in (1.98 m)	275 lb (125 kg)	5.2	Feb 5, 2013
Johnson, Dwayne; OL	Recruit ratings: Rivals: ESPN: (78)					
Joseph, Boaz; DB	Weston, FL	Cypress Bay	6 ft 1 in (1.85 m)	190 lb (86 kg)	N/A	Jan 23, 2013
Joseph, Boaz; DB	Recruit ratings: Rivals: ESPN: (74)					
Knevel, David; OT	Brantford	Pauline Johnson	6 ft 8 in (2.03 m)	290 lb (130 kg)	N/A	Dec 18, 2012
Knevel, David; OT	Recruit ratings: Rivals: ESPN: (80)					
Kondolo, Chongo; OL	Carrollton, TX	Fresno City CC	6 ft 4 in (1.93 m)	290 lb (130 kg)	N/A	Feb 1, 2013
Kondolo, Chongo; OL	Recruit ratings: Rivals: ESPN: (75)					
Love, Courtney; LB	Youngstown, OH	Cardinal Mooney	6 ft 1 in (1.85 m)	225 lb (102 kg)	4.6	Apr 22, 2012
Love, Courtney; LB	Recruit ratings: Rivals: ESPN: (81)					
Martinez, Drake; S/ATH	Laguna Beach, CA	Laguna Beach	6 ft 2 in (1.88 m)	200 lb (91 kg)	4.4	Jan 30, 2013
Martinez, Drake; S/ATH	Recruit ratings: Rivals: ESPN: (69)					
Maurice, Kevin; DT	Orlando, FL	Freedom	6 ft 3 in (1.91 m)	270 lb (120 kg)	N/A	Jan 4, 2013
Maurice, Kevin; DT	Recruit ratings: Rivals: ESPN: (74)					
Miller, Gabriel; LS	Mishawaka, IN	Penn	6 ft 1 in (1.85 m)	235 lb (107 kg)	5.28	Jun 17, 2012
Miller, Gabriel; LS	Recruit ratings: Rivals: ESPN: (68)					
Mixon, Dimarya; DE	Mesquite, TX	West Mesquite	6 ft 3 in (1.91 m)	265 lb (120 kg)	N/A	Feb 3, 2013
Mixon, Dimarya; DE	Recruit ratings: Rivals: ESPN: (75)					
Natter, A.J. DE	Milton, WI	Milton	6 ft 5 in (1.96 m)	240 lb (110 kg)	4.7	Apr 16, 2012
Natter, A.J. DE	Recruit ratings: Rivals: ESPN: (77)					
Newby, Marcus; LB	North Potomac, MD	Quince Orchard	6 ft 1 in (1.85 m)	207 lb (94 kg)	4.6	Jul 2, 2012
Newby, Marcus; LB	Recruit ratings: Rivals: ESPN: (82)					
Newby, Terrell; RB	West Hills, CA	Chaminade	5 ft 10 in (1.78 m)	180 lb (82 kg)	N/A	Jan 9, 2013
Newby, Terrell; RB	Recruit ratings: Rivals: ESPN: (81)					
Singleton, D.J. S	Jersey City, NJ	St. Peter's Prep	6 ft 1 in (1.85 m)	195 lb (88 kg)	4.46	Aug 21, 2011
Singleton, D.J. S	Recruit ratings: Rivals: ESPN: (80)					
Stanton, Johnny; QB	Rancho Santa Fe, CA	Santa Margarita	6 ft 2 in (1.88 m)	220 lb (100 kg)	N/A	Jul 9, 2012
Stanton, Johnny; QB	Recruit ratings: Rivals: ESPN: (82)					
Suttles, Ernest; DE kicked out from team	Tampa, FL	Gaither	6 ft 5 in (1.96 m)	240 lb (110 kg)	N/A	Jan 14, 2013
Suttles, Ernest; DE kicked out from team	Recruit ratings: Rivals: ESPN: (74)					
Taylor, Adam; RB	Katy, TX	Katy	6 ft 2 in (1.88 m)	200 lb (91 kg)	4.5	Nov 17, 2012
Taylor, Adam; RB	Recruit ratings: Rivals: ESPN: (80)					
Overall recruit ranking: Rivals: 16
‡ Refers to 40-yard dash; Note: In many cases, Scout, Rivals, 247Sports, On3, and ESPN may conflict in their listings of height, weight and 40 time.; In these cases, the average was taken. ESPN grades are on a 100-point scale.; Sources: "Yahoo Sports: Rivals.com 2013 Nebraska Commitments". Rivals.; "Scout.com 2013 Nebraska Commitments". Scout.; "ESPN 2013 Nebraska Commitments". ESPN.; "Scout.com Team Recruiting Rankings". Scout.; "2013 Team Ranking". Rivals.com.

==== Walk-on recruits ====
College recruiting
Name	Hometown	School	Height	Weight	40^{‡}	Commit date
Ackerman, Jordan; DE/TE	Lincoln, NE	Southeast	6 ft 3 in (1.91 m)	240 lb (110 kg)	4.9	Jan 16, 2013
Ackerman, Jordan; DE/TE	Recruit ratings: No ratings found					
Bellar, Jordan; P	Norfolk, NE	Norfolk Catholic	6 ft 0 in (1.83 m)	165 lb (75 kg)	N/A	Jan 16, 2013
Bellar, Jordan; P	Recruit ratings: No ratings found					
Evans, Erik; TE	Waverly, NE	Waverly	6 ft 3 in (1.91 m)	220 lb (100 kg)	4.7	Jan 16, 2013
Evans, Erik; TE	Recruit ratings: No ratings found					
Fordan, Jack; LB	Frankfort, IL	Providence Catholic	6 ft 2 in (1.88 m)	220 lb (100 kg)	N/A	
Fordan, Jack; LB	Recruit ratings: No ratings found					
Glaser, Dustin; OL	Flower Mound, TX	Flower Mound	6 ft 3 in (1.91 m)	285 lb (129 kg)	N/A	Jan 18, 2013
Glaser, Dustin; OL	Recruit ratings: No ratings found					
Graeber, Steve; DT	Omaha, NE	Millard North	6 ft 1 in (1.85 m)	250 lb (110 kg)	4.7	Jan 18, 2013
Graeber, Steve; DT	Recruit ratings: No ratings found					
Jordan, Harrison; FB	Omaha, NE	Westside	5 ft 10 in (1.78 m)	230 lb (100 kg)	4.9	Jan 25, 2013
Jordan, Harrison; FB	Recruit ratings: No ratings found					
Ketter, Connor; TE	Norfolk, NE	Norfolk Catholic	6 ft 5 in (1.96 m)	225 lb (102 kg)	4.8	Jan 16, 2013
Ketter, Connor; TE	Recruit ratings: No ratings found					
Kubicek, Landon; OL	Lincoln, NE	Southeast	6 ft 4 in (1.93 m)	290 lb (130 kg)	5.6	Jan 28, 2013
Kubicek, Landon; OL	Recruit ratings: No ratings found					
Lewis, Spencer; WR	Papillion, NE	Papillion-La Vista	6 ft 2 in (1.88 m)	210 lb (95 kg)	N/A	Jan 17, 2013
Lewis, Spencer; WR	Recruit ratings: No ratings found					
Schumacher, Grant; PK	Lincoln, NE	Pius X	5 ft 9 in (1.75 m)	155 lb (70 kg)	N/A	
Schumacher, Grant; PK	Recruit ratings: No ratings found					
Stovall, Zach; DB	Bellevue, NE	Bellevue East	5 ft 11 in (1.80 m)	185 lb (84 kg)	4.46	Jan 17, 2013
Stovall, Zach; DB	Recruit ratings: No ratings found					
Weber, Chris; LB	Omaha, NE	Elkhorn	6 ft 3 in (1.91 m)	200 lb (91 kg)	4.7	Jan 19, 2013
Weber, Chris; LB	Recruit ratings: No ratings found					
Overall recruit ranking: Rivals: 16
‡ Refers to 40-yard dash; Note: In many cases, Scout, Rivals, 247Sports, On3, and ESPN may conflict in their listings of height, weight and 40 time.; In these cases, the average was taken. ESPN grades are on a 100-point scale.; Sources: "Yahoo Sports: Rivals.com 2013 Nebraska Commitments". Rivals.; "Scout.com 2013 Nebraska Commitments". Scout.; "ESPN 2013 Nebraska Commitments". ESPN.; "Scout.com Team Recruiting Rankings". Scout.; "2013 Team Ranking". Rivals.com.

== Schedule ==
Date	Time	Opponent	Rank	Site	TV	Result	Attendance
August 31	7:00 p.m.	Wyoming*	No. 18	Memorial Stadium; Lincoln, NE	BTN	W 37–34	91,185
September 7	5:00 p.m.	Southern Miss*	No. 22	Memorial Stadium; Lincoln, NE	BTN	W 56–13	90,466
September 14	11:00 a.m.	No. 16 UCLA*	No. 23	Memorial Stadium; Lincoln, NE	ABC	L 21–41	91,471
September 21	2:30 p.m.	No. 6 (FCS) South Dakota State*		Memorial Stadium; Lincoln, NE	BTN	W 59–20	90,614
October 5	11:00 a.m.	Illinois^{†}		Memorial Stadium; Lincoln, NE	ESPNU	W 39–19	90,458
October 12	11:00 a.m.	at Purdue		Ross–Ade Stadium; West Lafayette, IN	BTN	W 44–7	47,203
October 26	11:00 a.m.	at Minnesota	No. 25	TCF Bank Stadium; Minneapolis, MN	ESPN	L 23–34	49,995
November 2	2:30 p.m.	Northwestern		Memorial Stadium; Lincoln, NE	BTN	W 27–24	91,140
November 9	2:30 p.m.	at Michigan		Michigan Stadium; Ann Arbor, MI	ABC	W 17–13	112,204
November 16	2:30 p.m.	No. 16 Michigan State		Memorial Stadium; Lincoln, NE	ABC/ESPN2	L 28–41	90,872
November 23	2:30 p.m.	at Penn State		Beaver Stadium; University Park, PA	BTN	W 23–20 ^{OT}	98,517
November 29	11:00 a.m.	Iowa		Memorial Stadium; Lincoln, NE (Heroes Game)	ABC	L 17–38	91,260
January 1, 2014	11:00 a.m.	vs. No. 23 Georgia*		EverBank Field; Jacksonville, FL (Gator Bowl)	ESPN2	W 24–19	60,712
*Non-conference game; ^{†}Homecoming; Rankings from AP Poll released prior to the game; All times are in Central time

== Roster and coaching staff ==
2013 Nebraska Cornhuskers football team roster
Players
Coaches
Offense

Pos.	#	Name	Class
IB	8	Ameer Abdullah	Jr
WR	7	Taariq Allen	So
QB	4	Tommy Armstrong Jr.	RFr
WR	33	Christian Bailey	Fr
WR	21	Alex Balke	Fr
WR	80	Kenny Bell	Jr
TE	83	Jared Blum	RFr
QB	9	Tyson Broekemeier	So
WR	13	Sam Burtch	So
TE	11	Cethan Carter	Fr
OL	51	Brandon Chapek	Sr
OL	68	Jake Cotton	Jr
TE	84	Sam Cotton	RFr
OL	67	Scott Criss	Sr
IB	32	Imani Cross	So
WR	18	Quincy Enunwa (C)	Sr
TE	49	Erik Evans	Fr
WR	88	Tyler Evans	Jr
OL	59	Matt Finnin	Jr
TE	42	Trey Foster	RFr
IB	22	King Frazier	RFr
QB	17	Ryker Fyfe	RFr
WR	81	Kevin Gladney	Fr
OL	52	Dustin Glaser	Fr
OL	73	Sam Hahn	RFr
OL	72	Zach Hannon	Fr
TE	85	Greg Hart	Fr
WR	45	Lane Hovey	RFr
FB	35	Andy Janovich	So
OL	79	Dwayne Johnson Jr.	Fr
FB	38	Harrison Jordan	Fr
QB	12	Ron Kellogg III	Sr
TE	89	Connor Ketter	Fr
OL	77	David Knevel	Fr
OL	70	Chongo Kondolo	Jr
IB	24	Murat Kuzu	So
OL	75	Chris Long	So
TE	41	Jake Long	Sr
OL	61	Spencer Long (C)	Sr
QB	3	Taylor Martinez (C)	Sr
FB	44	Mitch McCann	RFr
WR	2	Alonzo Moore	RFr
OL	74	Mike Moudy	Jr
IB	29	Graham Nabity	RFr
IB	39	Jordan Nelson	RFr
IB	34	Terrell Newby	Fr
OL	54	Robby Painter	RFr
OL	56	Mark Pelini	Jr
OL	62	Cole Pensick	Sr
TE	40	Max Pirman	So
OL	78	Givens Price	So
OL	76	Brent Qvale	Sr
OL	65	Ryne Reeves	So
WR	87	Brandon Reilly	RFr
OL	63	Andrew Rodriguez	Sr
OL	71	Jeremiah Sirles	Sr
QB	5	Johnny Stanton	Fr
OL	57	Zach Sterup	So
TE	86	David Sutton	So
IB	28	Adam Taylor	Fr
OL	55	Paul Thurston	RFr
WR	10	Jamal Turner	Jr
OL	66	Dylan Utter	RFr
WR	1	Jordan Westerkamp	RFr
OL	58	Corey Whitaker	RFr
QB	16	Evan Williams	RFr
WR	82	Tyler Wullenwaber	Jr
WR	30	Richard Wynne Jr.	So
FB	31	C.J. Zimmerer	Sr

Defense

Pos.	#	Name	Class
DE	80	Jordan Ackerman	Fr
LB	33	Jared Afalava	RFr
S	18	LeRoy Alexander	RFr
LB	13	Zaire Anderson	Jr
DE	9	Jason Ankrah	Sr
DE	47	Walker Ashburn	Jr
LB	52	Josh Banderas	Fr
DT	7	Maliek Collins	Fr
S	6	Corey Cooper	Jr
DT	96	Aaron Curry	So
CB	23	Daniel Davie	So
DE	88	Ross Dzuris	RFr
CB	17	Ciante Evans (C)	Sr
CB	31	Joey Felici	Jr
LB	57	Jack Fordon	Fr
CB	30	Derek Foster	Jr
DE	95	Jack Gangwish	So
LB	25	Nathan Gerry	Fr
DT	58	Steve Graeber	Fr
S	11	Andrew Green	Sr
DE	44	Randy Gregory	So
DT	99	Jay Guy	Jr
S	21	Charles Jackson	So
S	1	Harvey Jackson	Jr
S	29	Seth Jameson	Sr
CB	16	Stanley Jean-Baptiste	Sr
DL	50	Garret Johns	RFr
DB	12	Boaz Joseph	Fr
LB	51	Courtney Love	Fr
DB	36	Drake Martinez	Fr
DT	55	Kevin Maurice	Fr
DE	90	Greg McMullen	RFr
CB	5	Josh Mitchell	Jr
DE	94	Avery Moss	RFr
DE	45	A.J. Natter	Fr
LB	3	Marcus Newby	Fr
DT	69	Brodrick Nickens	Sr
DT	48	Tobi Okuyemi	Jr
DT	53	Thad Randle	Sr
DL	97	Logan Rath	RFr
S	19	Wil Richards	Sr
CB	22	Anthony Ridder	So
LB	43	Trevor Roach	Jr
CB	14	Jonathan Rose	So
LB	15	Michael Rose	RFr
LB	41	David Santos	So
CB	4	Mohammed Seisay	Sr
LB	56	Brad Simpson	RFr
DB	8	D.J. Singleton	Fr
LB	59	Colby Starkebaum	Sr
DB	26	Zach Stovall	Fr
DT	98	Vincent Valentine	RFr
DE	91	Donovan Vestal	Jr
LB	49	Chris Weber	Fr
LB	24	Austin Williams	Jr
DT	92	Kevin Williams (injured)	So

Special teams

Pos.	#	Name	Class
P	98	Jordan Bellar	Fr
PK	37	Mauro Bondi	So
P/WR	27	Sam Foltz	RFr
PK	95	Spencer Lindsay	RFr
LS	91	Gabriel Miller	Fr
LS	97	Joseph Rotherham	So
PK	47	Grant Schumacher	Fr
PK	94	Pat Smith	Sr

Head coach

- Bo Pelini
  6th season
  7th year at Nebraska
  Alma mater: Ohio State

Coordinators/assistant coaches

- Tim Beck
  3rd season as OC/QB coach
  6th year at Nebraska
  Alma mater: UCF
- John Papuchis
  2nd season as DC coach
  6th year at Nebraska
  Alma mater: Virginia Tech
- Ron Brown
  3rd season as RB coach
  23rd year at Nebraska
  Alma mater: Brown
- Barney Cotton
  1st season as AHC/TE coach
  7th year at Nebraska
  Alma mater: Nebraska
- Ross Els
  3rd season as LB coach
  3rd year at Nebraska
  Alma mater: Nebraska-Omaha
- Rich Fisher
  3rd season as WR coach
  3rd year at Nebraska
  Alma mater: Colorado
- John Garrison
  1st season as OL coach
  3rd year at Nebraska
  Alma mater: Nebraska
- Rick Kaczenski
  2nd season as DL coach
  2nd year at Nebraska
  Alma mater: Notre Dame
- James Dobson
  6th season as S&C coach
  6th year at Nebraska
  Alma mater: Wisconsin
- Terry Joseph
  2nd season as Sec coach
  3rd year at Nebraska
  Alma mater: Northwestern State

Legend

- (C) Team captain
- (S) Suspended
- (I) Ineligible
- Injured
- Redshirt

Roster
Last update: September 3, 2013

=== Depth chart ===
Defense

FS
Corey Cooper
LeRoy Alexander
⋅

WILL	MIKE	BUCK
Zaire Anderson	Michael Rose	David Santos
Jared Afalava	Josh Banderas	Nate Gerry
⋅	⋅	⋅

SS
Andrew Green
Harvey Jackson
Charles Jackson

CB
Stanley Jean-Baptiste
Josh Mitchell
⋅

DE	DT	DT	DE
Randy Gregory	Aaron Curry; Vincent Valentine	Thad Randle	Jason Ankrah
Avery Moss	Kevin Maurice	Maliek Collins	Greg McMullen
⋅	⋅	⋅	⋅

CB
Ciante Evans
Mohamed Seisay
⋅

Offense

WR
Kenny Bell
A-Sam Burtch
Jordan Westerkamp
Brandon Reilly

LT	LG	C	RG	RT
Brent Qvale	Jake Cotton	Cole Pensick	Spencer Long (injured) Andrew Rodriguez	Jeremiah Sirles
Matt Finnin	Ryne Reeves	Mark Pelini	Mike Moudy	Zach Sterup
⋅	⋅	⋅	⋅	⋅

TE
Jake Long
Cethan Carter
Sam Cotton

WR
Quincy Enunwa
Alonzo Moore
Taariq Allen

QB
Tommy Armstrong
Ron Kellogg
⋅

Key reserves
Season-ending injury Number of games played ()
QB Taylor Martinez (4)
WR Jamal Turner (7)
OG Spencer Long (6)

RB
Ameer Abdullah
Imani Cross
Terrell Newby

FB
C.J. Zimmerer
Andy Janovich
⋅

Special teams
PK Pat Smith
P Sam Foltz
KR Kenny Bell
PR Jordan Westerkamp
LS Gabreil Miller

== Game summaries ==
=== Wyoming ===
This was the Cowboys' first visit to Lincoln since 1994, when Nebraska defeated the Cowboys 42–32 en route to a national championship. The two teams last played in 2011, when Nebraska defeated the Cowboys 38–14 in Laramie. In the week leading up to the game, Pelini handed out seven Blackshirts to his defense. This was the first time during Pelini's tenure that he has handed them out prior to the start of the season. In the game, both Ameer Abdullah and Imani Cross rushed for more than 100 yards. Despite the victory, the Nebraska defense allowed Wyoming to accumulate 602 yards of offense, the second-most allowed ever by Nebraska in a win. With Nebraska's victory they now lead the all-time series 7–0.

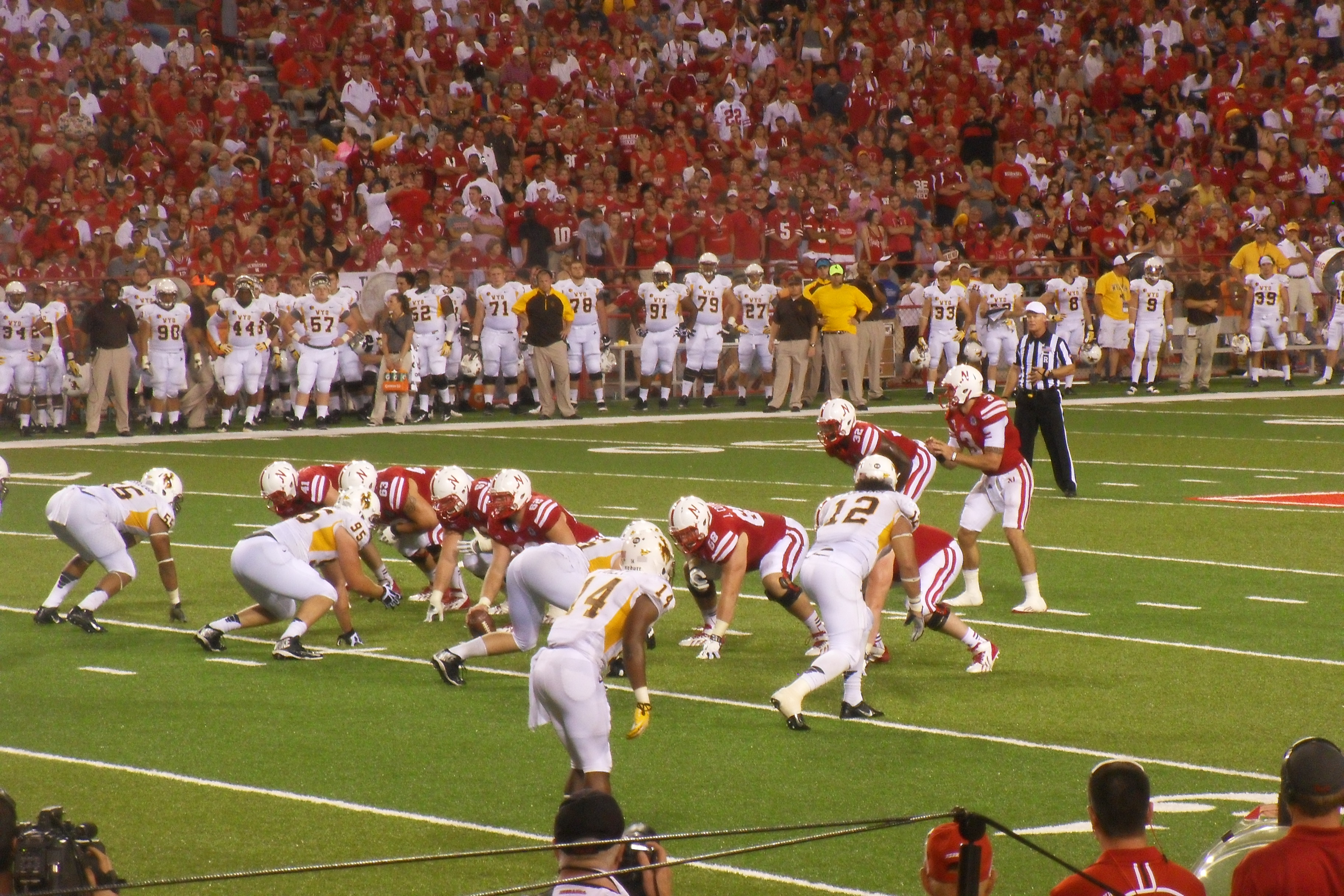

Wyoming at Nebraska

Team	1	2	3	4	Total
Wyoming	7	7	7	13	34
• #18 Nebraska	10	7	14	6	37

- Date: August 31
- Location: Memorial Stadium, Lincoln, Nebraska
- Game start: 7:00 p.m. CST
- Elapsed time: 3:33
- Game attendance: 91,185
- Game weather: Clear, 90 °F (32 °C), Wind S@5 mph (8.0 km/h)
- Referee: Eddy Shelton
- TV announcers (BTN): Kevin Kugler, Eric Crouch, Damon Benning

Wyoming Game starters

Position	Player
Quarterback	Taylor Martinez
Running Back	Ameer Abdullah
Wide Receiver	Kenny Bell
Wide Receiver	Jamal Turner
Wide Receiver	Quincy Enunwa
Tight End	Jake Long
Right Tackle	Andrew Rodriguez
Right Guard	Spencer Long
Center	Cole Pensick
Left Guard	Jake Cotton
Left Tackle	Jeremiah Sirles

Position	Player
Defensive End	Jason Ankrah
Defensive Tackle	Thad Randle
Defensive Tackle	Vincent Valentine
Defensive End	Avery Moss
Linebacker	David Santos
Cornerback	Mohammed Seisay
Cornerback	Ciante Evans
Free Safety	Corey Cooper
Strong Safety	Harvey Jackson
Cornerback	Stanley Jean-Baptiste
Cornerback	Josh Mitchell

=== Southern Miss ===
The Huskers hosted the Golden Eagles for the second straight year, with the Huskers winning 49–20 in 2012. This game was originally scheduled to be hosted by Southern Miss in Hattiesburg, Mississippi, but the game was sold back to Lincoln to make more money for the visiting team after considering playing the game in New Orleans or Kansas City. Following this year's win, Nebraska now leads the series 4–1. USM won in Lincoln in 2004.

Southern Miss at Nebraska

Team	1	2	3	4	Total
Southern Miss	3	3	7	0	13
• #22 Nebraska	21	14	14	7	56

- Date: September 7
- Location: Memorial Stadium, Lincoln, Nebraska
- Game start: 5:00 p.m. CST
- Elapsed time: 3:12
- Game attendance: 90,466
- Game weather: Clear, 86 °F (30 °C), Wind NNE@17 mph (27 km/h)
- Referee: Alex Kemp
- TV announcers (BTN): Paul Burmeister, Eric Crouch, Damon Benning

Southern Miss Game starters

Position	Player
Quarterback	Taylor Martinez
Running Back	Ameer Abdullah
Wide Receiver	Kenny Bell
Wide Receiver	Jamal Turner
Wide Receiver	Quincy Enunwa
Tight End	Jake Long
Right Tackle	Andrew Rodriguez
Right Guard	Spencer Long
Center	Cole Pensick
Left Guard	Jake Cotton
Left Tackle	Jeremiah Sirles

Position	Player
Defensive End	Jason Ankrah
Defensive Tackle	Thad Randle
Defensive Tackle	Vincent Valentine
Defensive End	Randy Gregory
Linebacker	Nate Gerry
Linebacker	Josh Banderas
Nickelback	Ciante Evans
Cornerback	Josh Mitchell
Free Safety	Corey Cooper
Strong Safety	Harvey Jackson
Cornerback	Stanley Jean-Baptiste

=== UCLA ===
The UCLA Bruins traveled to Memorial Stadium for the first time since a 49–21 loss in 1994. This was the second game in a home-home series, with the Bruins winning in Pasadena 36–30 in 2012. Nebraska led 21–3 midway through the second quarter before UCLA scored a touchdown before halftime. In the third quarter, UCLA scored 28 straight points to take a 38–21 lead against Nebraska before adding a field goal late in the game. UCLA's win tied the series 6–6, until Nebraska took the lead after defeating the Bruins in the 2015 Foster Farms Bowl. Nebraska wore alternate uniforms in this game created by Adidas. The game set a Memorial Stadium attendance record with 91,471 in attendance. The record was broken the next season in the Miami at Nebraska game, with 91,585 in attendance.

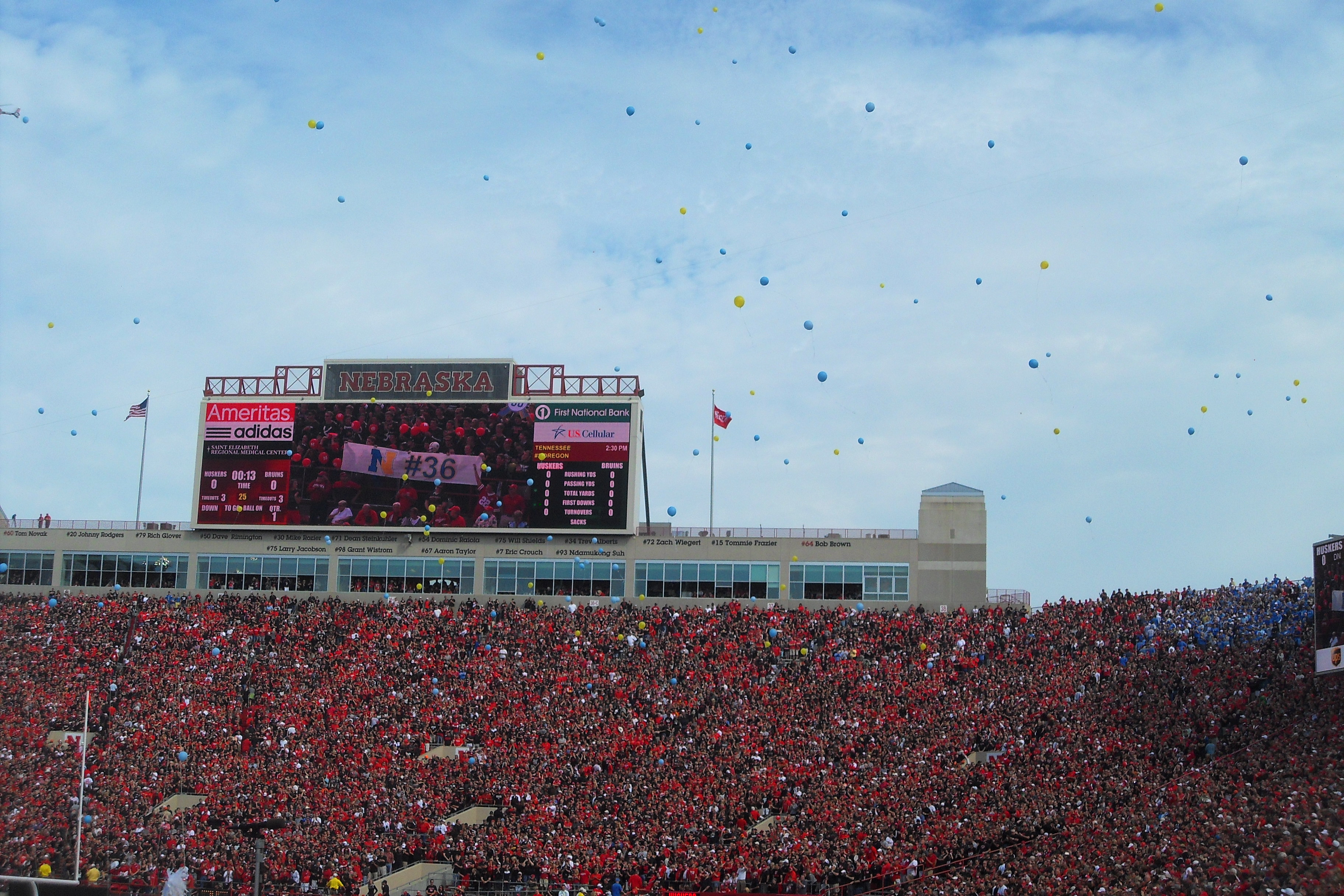
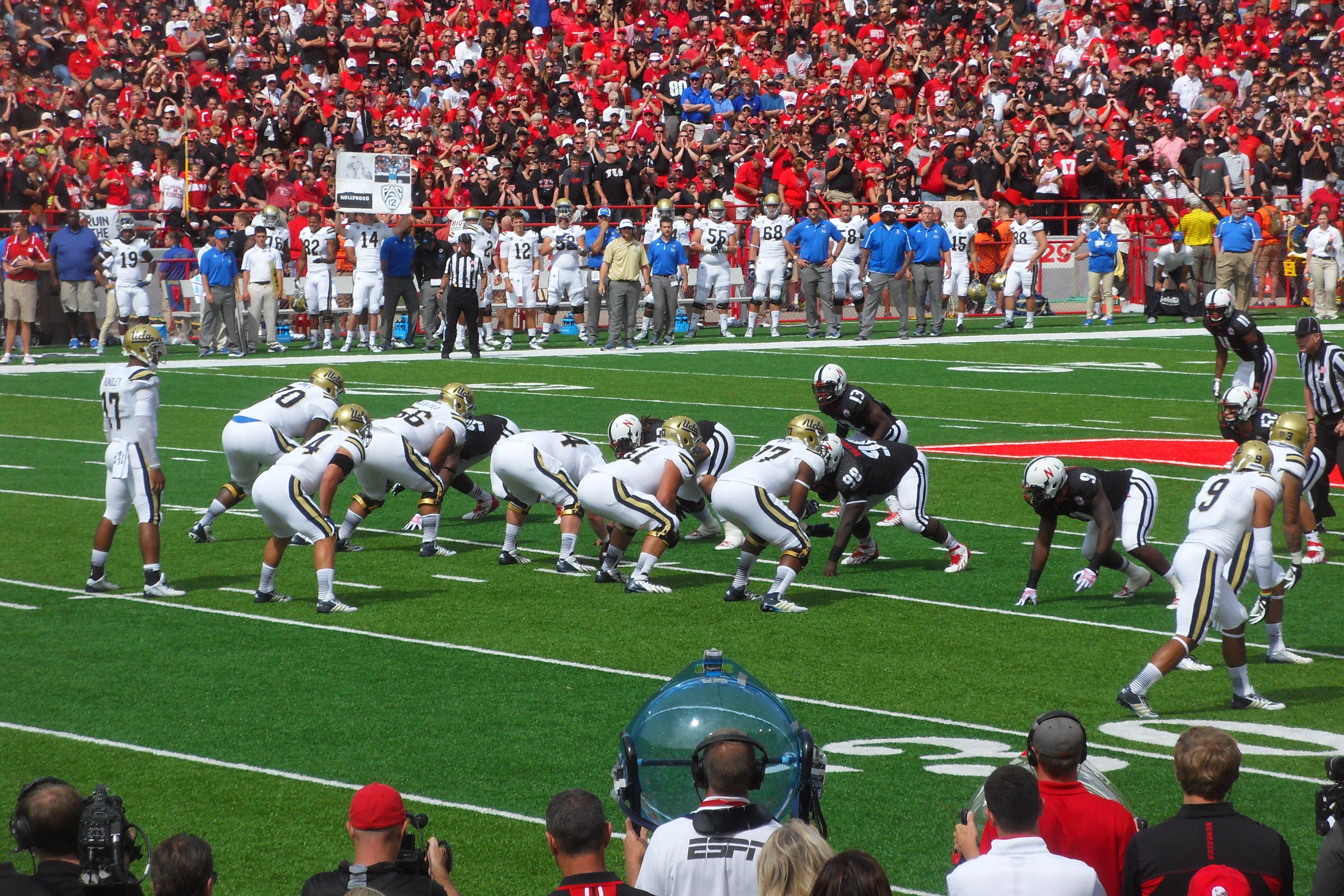
UCLA at Nebraska

Team	1	2	3	4	Total
• #16 UCLA	3	7	28	3	41
#23 Nebraska	14	7	0	0	21

- Date: September 14
- Location: Memorial Stadium, Lincoln, Nebraska
- Game start: 11:07 a.m. CST
- Elapsed time: 3:21
- Game attendance: 91,471
- Game weather: Sunny, 68 °F (20 °C), Wind S@11–17 mph (18–27 km/h)
- Referee: Michael Batlan
- TV announcers (ABC): Sean McDonough, Chris Spielman, Shannon Spake

Scoring summary
1	9:45	Nebraska	Quincy Enunwa 11-yard pass from Taylor Martinez (Pat Smith kick)	Nebraska 7–0
1	7:13	UCLA	Kaʻimi Fairbairn 44-yard field goal	Nebraska 7–3
1	0:31	Nebraska	Enunwa 14-yard pass from Martinez (Mauro Bondi kick)	Nebraska 14–3
2	7:12	Nebraska	Bell, Kenny 22 yd pass from Martinez, Taylor (Smith, Pat kick)	Nebraska 21–3
2	0:57	UCLA	Perkins, Paul 10 yd run (Fairbairn, Kaim kick)	Nebraska 21–10
3	8:31	UCLA	James, Jordon 3 yd run (Fairbairn, Kaim kick)	Nebraska 21–17
3	6:02	UCLA	Evans, Shaquell 28 yd pass from Hundley, Brett (Fairbairn, Kaim kick)	UCLA 21–24
3	3:39	UCLA	Ruhl, Phillip 12 yd pass from Hundley, Brett (Fairbairn, Kaim kick)	UCLA 21–31
3	0:26	UCLA	Iese, Nate 3 yd pass from Hundley, Brett (Fairbairn, Kaim kick)	UCLA 21–38
4	1:53	UCLA	Fairbairn, Kaim 24 yd field goal	UCLA 21–41

UCLA Game starters

Position	Player
Quarterback	Taylor Martinez
Running Back	Ameer Abdullah
Wide Receiver	Kenny Bell
Wide Receiver	Jamal Turner
Wide Receiver	Quincy Enunwa
Tight End	Jake Long
Right Tackle	Andrew Rodriguez
Right Guard	Spencer Long
Center	Cole Pensick
Left Guard	Jake Cotton
Left Tackle	Jeremiah Sirles

Position	Player
Defensive End	Jason Ankrah
Defensive Tackle	Thad Randle
Defensive Tackle	Vincent Valentine
Defensive End	Randy Gregory
Linebacker	Nate Gerry
Linebacker	Josh Banderas
Nickelback	Ciante Evans
Cornerback	Josh Mitchell
Free Safety	Corey Cooper
Strong Safety	Andrew Green
Cornerback	Stanley Jean-Baptiste

=== South Dakota State ===
The South Dakota State Jackrabbits made their third trip ever to Lincoln, falling to the Huskers previously in 1963 and 2010. After trailing 17–14, Nebraska scored 38 straight points en route to a 59–20 win over South Dakota State. The Huskers amassed 645 yards of total offense with 310 yards passing and 335 rushing, the first time in school history that Nebraska broke the 300-yard barrier in both rushing and passing. Starting quarterback Taylor Martinez sat out this game with a turf toe injury, so backups Tommy Armstrong Jr. and Ron Kellogg III took his place. Tommy Armstrong went 12-of-15 for 169 yards with a TD in the win, while teammate Ron Kellog was 8-of-9 for 136 yards and a 1 TD of his own. Ameer Abdullah was the top Husker rusher with 139 yards and a TD on 15 carries while Imani Cross added 60 yards rushing and 2 TDs on 10 carries. Quincy Enunwa was the top receiving target with 6 catches for 78 yards, while Tyler Wullenwaber added 47 yards and a TD on two catches. For SDSU, Austin Sumner was 19-of-29 for 238 yards with 2 INTs. Zach Zenner had 21 carries for 202 yards, the 10th most individual rushing yards ever allowed by the Huskers, and 2 TDs. Cam Jones had 6 catches for 68 yards in the loss.

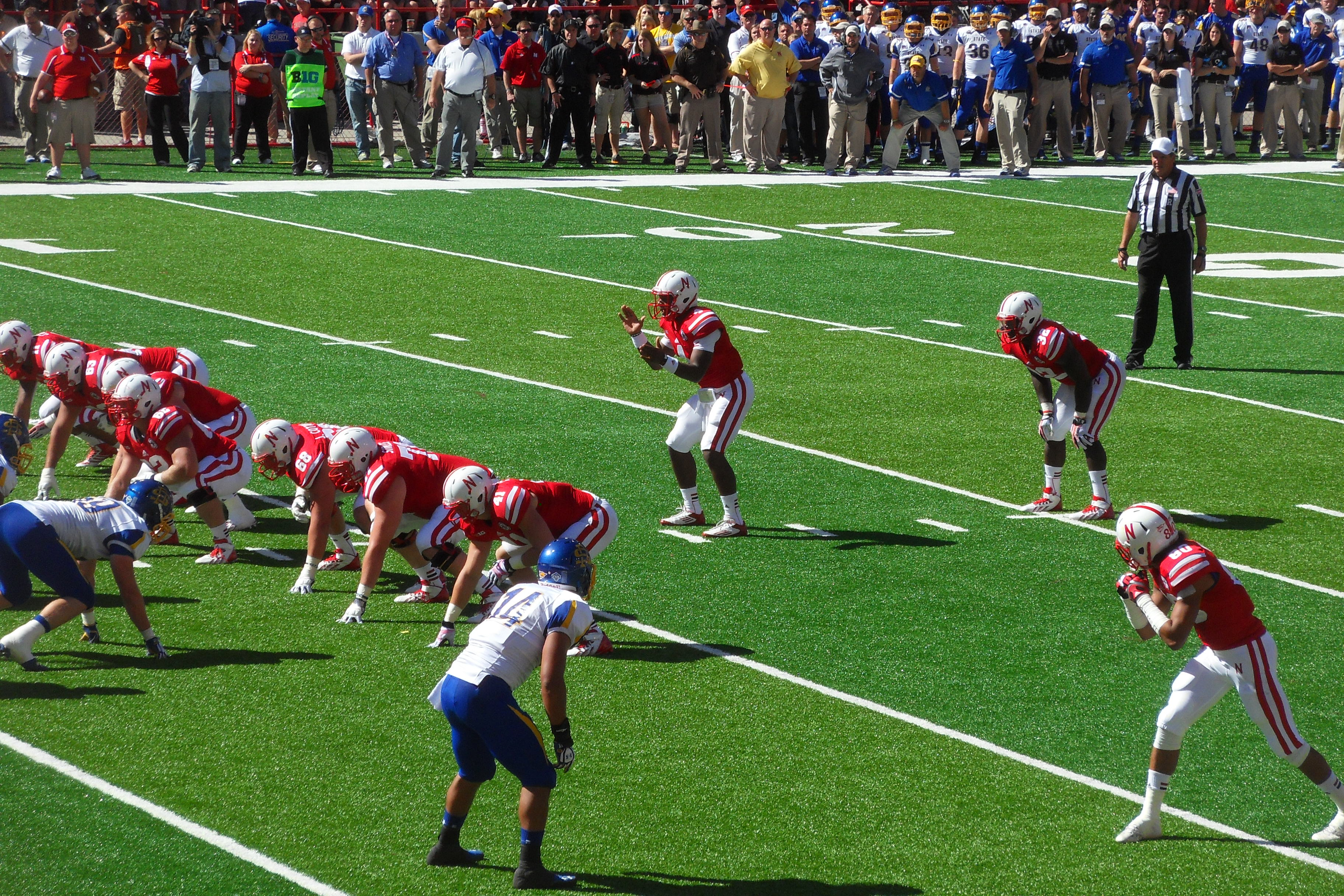

South Dakota State at Nebraska

Team	1	2	3	4	Total
South Dakota State	17	0	0	3	20
• Nebraska	14	24	14	7	59

- Date: September 21
- Location: Memorial Stadium, Lincoln, Nebraska
- Game start: 2:42 p.m. CST
- Elapsed time: 3:11
- Game attendance: 90,614
- Game weather: Sunny, 74 °F (23 °C), Wind: S@13 mph (21 km/h)
- Referee: Todd Geerlings
- TV announcers (BTN): Paul Burmeister, Eric Crouch, Damon Benning

SDSU Game starters

Position	Player
Quarterback	Tommy Armstrong
Running Back	Ameer Abdullah
Wide Receiver	Kenny Bell
Wide Receiver	Jamal Turner
Wide Receiver	Quincy Enunwa
Tight End	Jake Long
Right Tackle	Andrew Rodriguez
Right Guard	Spencer Long
Center	Cole Pensick
Left Guard	Jake Cotton
Left Tackle	Jeremiah Sirles

Position	Player
Defensive End	Jason Ankrah
Defensive Tackle	Thad Randle
Defensive Tackle	Vincent Valentine
Defensive End	Randy Gregory
Linebacker	Nate Gerry
Linebacker	Josh Banderas
Nickelback	Ciante Evans
Cornerback	Stanley Jean-Baptiste
Free Safety	Corey Cooper
Strong Safety	Andrew Green
Cornerback	Josh Mitchell

=== Illinois ===
Illinois made their first trip to Memorial Stadium since 1985. This was the first year of back to back trips to Lincoln for the Fighting Illini. Following this win the Huskers now lead the all-time series 8–2–1.

Illinois at Nebraska

Team	1	2	3	4	Total
Illinois	0	5	7	7	19
• Nebraska	14	9	13	3	39

- Date: October 5
- Location: Memorial Stadium, Lincoln, Nebraska
- Game start: 11:02 a.m. CST
- Elapsed time: 3:24
- Game attendance: 90,458
- Game weather: Partly Cloudy, 45 °F (7 °C), Wind: WSW@26 mph (42 km/h)
- Referee: Bill LeMonnier
- TV announcers (ESPNU): Tom Hart, John Congemi

Illinois Game starters

Position	Player
Quarterback	Tommy Armstrong
Running Back	Ameer Abdullah
Wide Receiver	Kenny Bell
Wide Receiver	Alonzo Moore
Wide Receiver	Quincy Enunwa
Tight End	Jake Long
Right Tackle	Andrew Rodriguez
Right Guard	Spencer Long
Center	Cole Pensick
Left Guard	Jake Cotton
Left Tackle	Jeremiah Sirles

Position	Player
Defensive End	Jason Ankrah
Defensive Tackle	Thad Randle
Defensive Tackle	Aaron Curry
Defensive End	Randy Gregory
Linebacker	David Santos
Linebacker	Michael Rose
Linebacker	Jared Afalava
Cornerback	Stanley Jean-Baptiste
Free Safety	Corey Cooper
Strong Safety	Andrew Green
Cornerback	Ciante Evans

=== Purdue ===
This was the second meeting ever between the schools. Purdue won the only other meeting, 28–0, in 1958 in West Lafayette. Purdue scored in the final minute of the game to avoid being shut out in a 44–7 Nebraska win. Nebraska's defense held Purdue to 216 total yards of offense while recording five sacks and forcing a pair of turnovers. The Boilermakers gained 32 yards rushing in the contest. Nebraska gained 435 total yards with 184 through the air and 251 on the ground. Ron Kellogg III was the top passer for the Huskers, going 10-of-13 for 141 yards and a TD. Ameer Abdullah added 126 yards rushing on 20 carries with a TD and Quincy Enunwa was the top Husker receiver with four catches for 72 yards and a score. David Santos led the Huskers in tackles with five while Randy Gregory had two sacks and a fumble recovery.

Nebraska at Purdue

Team	1	2	3	4	Total
• Nebraska	14	7	9	14	44
Purdue	0	0	0	7	7

- Date: October 12
- Location: Ross–Ade Stadium, West Lafayette, Indiana
- Game start: 12:01 p.m. EST
- Elapsed time: 3:24
- Game attendance: 47,203
- Game weather: Sunny, 71 °F (22 °C), wind: SSW@6 mph (9.7 km/h)
- Referee: Dave Witvoet
- TV announcers (BTN): Kevin Kugler, Chuck Long, Jeremy Leman

Purdue Game starters

Position	Player
Quarterback	Tommy Armstrong
Running Back	Ameer Abdullah
Wide Receiver	Kenny Bell
Wide Receiver	Jamal Turner
Wide Receiver	Quincy Enunwa
Tight End	Cethan Carter
Right Tackle	Andrew Rodriguez
Right Guard	Spencer Long
Center	Cole Pensick
Left Guard	Jake Cotton
Left Tackle	Jeremiah Sirles

Position	Player
Defensive End	Jason Ankrah
Defensive Tackle	Thad Randle
Defensive Tackle	Aaron Curry
Defensive End	Randy Gregory
Nickelback	Stanley Jean-Baptiste
Linebacker	David Santos
Nickelback	LeRoy Alexander
Cornerback	Josh Mitchell
Free Safety	Corey Cooper
Strong Safety	Andrew Green
Cornerback	Ciante Evans

=== Minnesota ===
Nebraska and Minnesota met for the 54th time in a series that began in 1900. Nebraska has played Minnesota more times than any other Big Ten Conference member. Coming into the game the Golden Gophers led the all-time series 29–22–2, but Nebraska had won the last 16 games in the series, including the last two since joining the Big Ten Conference.

In the game, after jumping out to a 10–0 lead, Minnesota used its run game to beat Nebraska for the first time since 1960, ending a streak of 16 straight losses to the Huskers. The Gophers outgained the Huskers in total offense 430–328 and gained 271 yards on the ground. The game saw the return of Taylor Martinez to the starting lineup. He went 16-of-30 for 139 yards with 1 TD and 1 INT. Ameer Abdullah added 165 yards rushing on 19 carries in the loss.

Nebraska at Minnesota

Team	1	2	3	4	Total
#25 Nebraska	10	3	7	3	23
• Minnesota	7	10	10	7	34

- Date: October 26
- Location: TCF Bank Stadium, Minneapolis, Minnesota
- Game start: 11:01 a.m. CST
- Elapsed time: 3:28
- Game attendance: 49,995
- Game weather: Mostly Sunny, 42 °F (6 °C), Wind: NNW@17 mph (27 km/h)
- Referee: Bill Lemonnier
- TV announcers (ESPN): Dave Pasch, Brian Griese, Tom Luginbill

Minnesota Game starters

Position	Player
Quarterback	Taylor Martinez
Running Back	Ameer Abdullah
Wide Receiver	Kenny Bell
Wide Receiver	Alonzo Moore
Wide Receiver	Quincy Enunwa
Tight End	Cethan Carter
Right Tackle	Andrew Rodriguez
Right Guard	Mike Moudy
Center	Cole Pensick
Left Guard	Jake Cotton
Left Tackle	Jeremiah Sirles

Position	Player
Defensive End	Jason Ankrah
Defensive Tackle	Thad Randle
Defensive Tackle	Aaron Curry
Defensive End	Randy Gregory
Linebacker	Jared Afalava
Linebacker	David Santos
Linebacker	Zaire Anderson
Cornerback	Stanley Jean-Baptiste
Free Safety	Corey Cooper
Strong Safety	Andrew Green
Cornerback	Ciante Evans

=== Northwestern ===
This was the third straight year as Big 10 members against each other, with Northwestern winning 28–25 in 2011 and Nebraska winning in 2012, 29–28.

Jordan Westerkamp caught a tipped hail mary pass in the end zone as time expired from Ron Kellogg III to give Nebraska a 27–24 win over the Northwestern Wildcats. The Huskers outgained the Wildcats in the contest 472 yards to 326. Tommy Armstrong was 15-of-29 for 173 yards with 1 TD and 3 INTs in the win. Ameer Abdullah had 127 yards rushing on 24 carries and Jordan Westerkamp had four catches for 104 yards and a TD. Nebraska moves to 5–2 all-time against Northwestern.

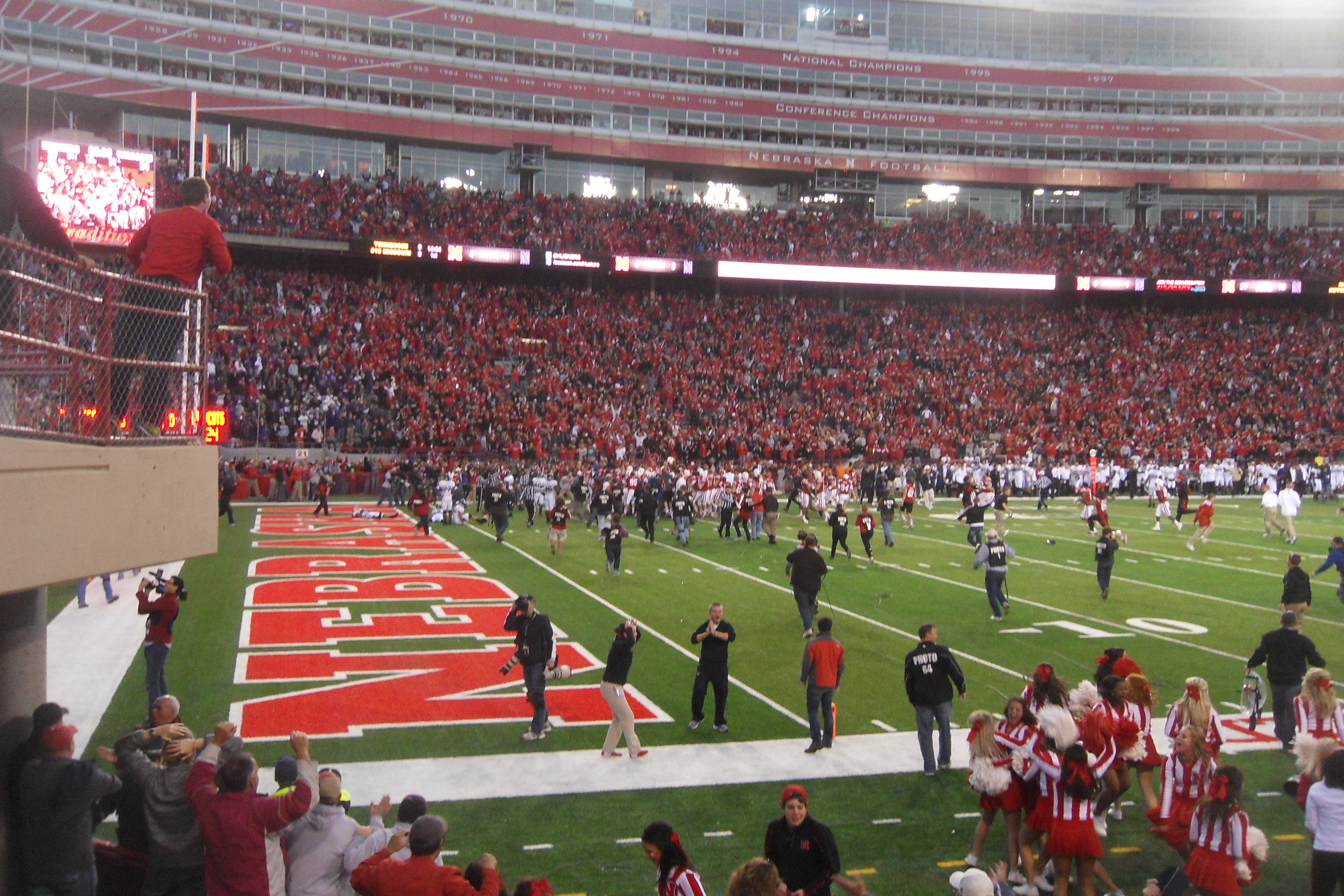
The aftermath of the Hail Mary

Northwestern at Nebraska

Team	1	2	3	4	Total
Northwestern	14	7	0	3	24
• Nebraska	7	7	7	6	27

- Date: November 2
- Location: Memorial Stadium, Lincoln, Nebraska
- Game start: 2:42 p.m. CST
- Elapsed time: 3:39
- Game attendance: 91,140
- Game weather: Sunny, 55 °F (13 °C), Wind: WNW@6–20 mph (9.7–32.2 km/h)
- Referee: Mike Cannon
- TV announcers (BTN): Eric Collins, Chuck Long, Jon Jansen

Northwestern Game starters

Position	Player
Quarterback	Tommy Armstrong
Running Back	Ameer Abdullah
FullBack	C.J Zimmerer
Wide Receiver	Kenny Bell
Wide Receiver	Quincy Enunwa
Tight End	Cethan Carter
Right Tackle	Andrew Rodriguez
Right Guard	Mike Moudy
Center	Cole Pensick
Left Guard	Jake Cotton
Left Tackle	Jeremiah Sirles

Position	Player
Defensive End	Jason Ankrah
Defensive Tackle	Thad Randle
Defensive Tackle	Aaron Curry
Defensive End	Randy Gregory
Linebacker	David Santos
Linebacker	Michael Rose
Linebacker	Zaire Anderson
Cornerback	Stanley Jean-Baptiste
Free Safety	Corey Cooper
Strong Safety	Andrew Green
Cornerback	Ciante Evans

=== Michigan ===
Nebraska mounted a late fourth quarter drive to win 17–13, tying the all-time series with Michigan at 4–4–1. The loss snaps a 19-game home winning streak under coach Brady Hoke at Michigan Stadium. The Huskers scored the first 10 points of the game in the first quarter, then Michigan scored the next 13 before Nebraska would come back with the game-winning touchdown with just over two minutes left in the game. The Huskers outgained the Wolverines in total offense 273 yards to 175 while holding Michigan to minus-21 yards rushing in the contest. Tommy Armstrong was 11-of-19 for 139 yards with a TD, Ameer Abdullah had 27 carries for 105 yards with one rushing and one receiving TD and Quincy Enunwa had 7 catches for 69 yards to lead the Huskers offensively. Defensively, Randy Gregory came up with three sacks of Michigan QB Devin Gardner to lead a Blackshirt defense that produced seven sacks on the day.

Nebraska at Michigan

Team	1	2	3	4	Total
• Nebraska	10	0	0	7	17
Michigan	0	3	7	3	13

- Date: November 9
- Location: Michigan Stadium, Ann Arbor, Michigan
- Game start: 3:36 p.m. EST
- Elapsed time: 3:04
- Game attendance: 112,204
- Game weather: Partly Cloudy, Mid 50s, Wind: SW@15–25 mph (24–40 km/h)
- Referee: John O'Neil
- TV announcers (ABC): Sean McDonough, Chris Spielman, Shannon Spake

Michigan Game starters

Position	Player
Quarterback	Tommy Armstrong
Running Back	Ameer Abdullah
Wide Receiver	Kenny Bell
Wide Receiver	Sam Burtch
Wide Receiver	Quincy Enunwa
Tight End	Jake Long
Right Tackle	Brent Qvale
Right Guard	Mike Moudy
Center	Cole Pensick
Left Guard	Andrew Rodriguez
Left Tackle	Jeremiah Sirles

Position	Player
Defensive End	Jason Ankrah
Defensive Tackle	Thad Randle
Defensive Tackle	Aaron Curry
Defensive End	Randy Gregory
Linebacker	David Santos
Linebacker	Michael Rose
Linebacker	Zaire Anderson
Cornerback	Stanley Jean-Baptiste
Free Safety	LeRoy Alexander
Strong Safety	Andrew Green
Cornerback	Ciante Evans

=== Michigan State ===
Michigan State, previously 0–7 against Nebraska, won their first ever game in the series with a 41–28 win over the Huskers. Nebraska outgained the Spartans in total offense 392 yards to 361 but was unable to overcome five turnovers, which resulted in 24 Michigan State points. MSU also held an advantage in time of possession at 38:37 to 21:23. Ameer Abdullah was the first runner this season to gain 100 yards on the Spartans, the number one ranked defense in the country coming into the game, with 123 yards on 22 carries.

Michigan State at Nebraska

Team	1	2	3	4	Total
• #16 Michigan State	10	10	7	14	41
Nebraska	7	0	14	7	28

- Date: November 16
- Location: Memorial Stadium, Lincoln, Nebraska
- Game start: 2:37 p.m. CST
- Elapsed time: 3:36
- Game attendance: 90,872
- Game weather: Sunny, 64 °F (18 °C), Wind SW@12–28
- Referee: Don Capron
- TV announcers (ABC/ESPN2): Sean McDonough, Chris Spielman, Shannon Spake

Michigan State Game starters

Position	Player
Quarterback	Tommy Armstrong
Running Back	Ameer Abdullah
Wide Receiver	Kenny Bell
Wide Receiver	Sam Burtch
Wide Receiver	Quincy Enunwa
Tight End	Jake Long
Right Tackle	Brent Qvale
Right Guard	Cole Pensick
Center	Mark Pelini
Left Guard	Andrew Rodriguez
Left Tackle	Jeremiah Sirles

Position	Player
Defensive End	Jason Ankrah
Defensive Tackle	Thad Randle
Defensive Tackle	Aaron Curry
Defensive End	Randy Gregory
Linebacker	David Santos
Linebacker	Michael Rose
Linebacker	Zaire Anderson
Cornerback	Stanley Jean-Baptiste
Free Safety	Corey Cooper
Strong Safety	Andrew Green
Cornerback	Ciante Evans

=== Penn State ===
Nebraska was able to convert a field goal in overtime to give Nebraska a 23–20 win on the road over the Nittany Lions. The Huskers tied the game at 20–20 late in the fourth quarter on a 19-yard field goal by Pat Smith to force overtime. Penn State missed a 37-yard attempt in their overtime period while Smith connected on a 42-yarder for the win. Nebraska was outgained in total offense by Penn State 387 to 360 yards. Ron Kellogg III was 20-of-34 for 191 yards with a TD. Ameer Abdullah had 25 carries for 147 yards rushing and the receiving corps was led by Jordan Westerkamp with five catches for 62 yards and Quincy Enunwa who had three catches for 42 yards and a TD.

Nebraska at Penn State

Team	1	2	3	4	OT	Total
• Nebraska	0	7	10	3	3	23
Penn State	6	0	7	7	0	20

- Date: November 23
- Location: Beaver Stadium, University Park, Pennsylvania
- Game start: 3:42 p.m. EST
- Elapsed time: 3:28
- Game attendance: 98,517
- Game weather: Cold, Cloudy, 37 °F (3 °C), Wind W@16–24 mph (26–39 km/h)
- Referee: Jerry McGinn
- TV announcers (BTN): Eric Collins, Chuck Long, Jon Jansen

Penn State Game starters

Position	Player
Quarterback	Tommy Armstrong
Running Back	Ameer Abdullah
Wide Receiver	Kenny Bell
Wide Receiver	Sam Burtch
Wide Receiver	Quincy Enunwa
Tight End	Jake Long
Right Tackle	Brent Qvale
Right Guard	Jake Cotton
Center	Mark Pelini
Left Guard	Andrew Rodriguez
Left Tackle	Jeremiah Sirles

Position	Player
Defensive End	Jason Ankrah
Defensive Tackle	Vincent Valentine
Defensive Tackle	Aaron Curry
Defensive End	Randy Gregory
Linebacker	David Santos
Linebacker	Michael Rose
Linebacker	Zaire Anderson
Cornerback	Stanley Jean-Baptiste
Free Safety	Corey Cooper
Strong Safety	Andrew Green
Cornerback	Ciante Evans

=== Iowa ===
Meeting for the Heroes Trophy. Following the Husker's loss Nebraska now leads the series by a mark of 28–13–3.

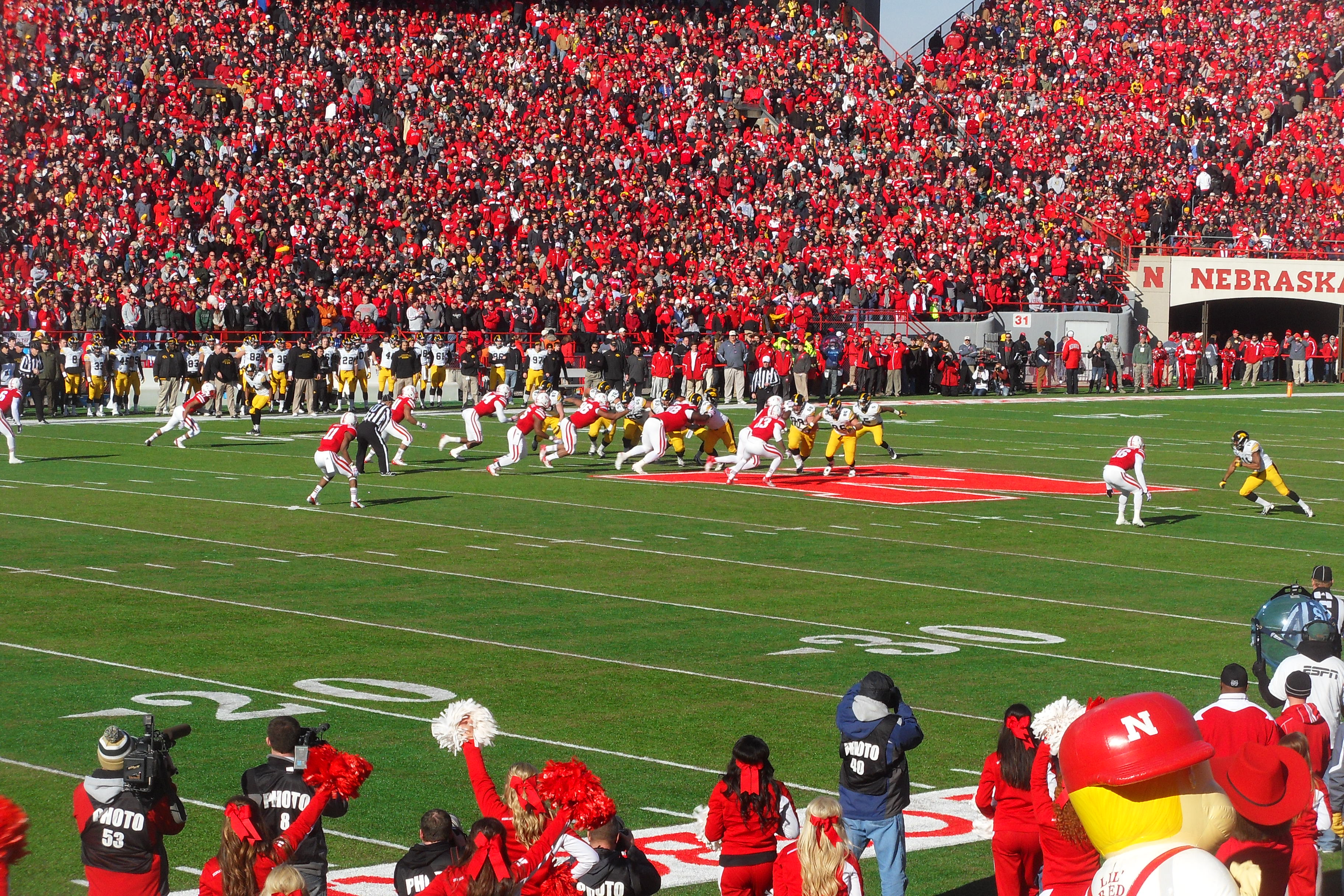

Iowa at Nebraska

Team	1	2	3	4	Total
• Iowa	7	7	10	14	38
Nebraska	0	3	7	7	17

- Date: November 29
- Location: Memorial Stadium, Lincoln, Nebraska
- Game start: 11:07 a.m. CST
- Elapsed time: 3:24
- Game attendance: 91,260
- Game weather: Sunny, 33 °F (1 °C), Wind S@15
- Referee: Alex Kemp
- TV announcers (ABC): Bob Wischusen, Rod Gilmore, Quint Kessenich

Iowa Game starters

Position	Player
Quarterback	Ron Kellogg
Running Back	Ameer Abdullah
Wide Receiver	Kenny Bell
Wide Receiver	Sam Burtch
Wide Receiver	Quincy Enunwa
Tight End	Cethan Carter
Left Tackle	Brent Qvale
Left Guard	Jake Cotton
Center	Cole Pensick
Right Guard	Andrew Rodriguez
Right Tackle	Jeremiah Sirles

Position	Player
Defensive End	Jason Ankrah
Defensive Tackle	Vincent Valentine
Defensive Tackle	Aaron Curry
Defensive End	Randy Gregory
Linebacker	David Santos
Linebacker	Michael Rose
Linebacker	Josh Banderas
Cornerback	Stanley Jean-Baptiste
Free Safety	Corey Cooper
Strong Safety	Andrew Green
Cornerback	Ciante Evans

=== Gator Bowl ===
This year's Gator Bowl was a rematch of last year's Capital One Bowl that was won by Georgia. The Huskers led the contest en route to a 24–19 victory. UGA outgained Nebraska in total offense 416 to 307 but committed one more turnover. Nebraska was led by Tommy Armstrong who went 6-of-14 for 163 yards with two TDs and one INT. Included in that performance was a school-record 99-yard TD pass to Quincy Enunwa in the third quarter. Ameer Abdullah had 27 carries for 122 yards and a TD, his 11th 100-yard rushing performance of the season. Enunwa led in the receiving department with four catches for 129 yards and two TDs. For his efforts, Quincy Enunwa was named Gator Bowl MVP.

Nebraska vs. Georgia

Team	1	2	3	4	Total
• Nebraska	0	10	14	0	24
#23 Georgia	0	9	3	7	19

- Date: January 1
- Location: EverBank Field, Jacksonville, FL
- Game start: 12:00 p.m. EST
- Elapsed time: 3:23
- Game attendance: 60,712
- Game weather: Light rain, 57 °F (14 °C), Wind Calm
- Referee: Mike Batlan
- TV announcers (ESPN2/Touchdown Radio): Mike Patrick, Ed Cunningham, Jeannine Edwards/Frank Frangie, Casey Jones

Georgia Game starters

Position	Player
Quarterback	Tommy Armstrong
Running Back	Ameer Abdullah
Wide Receiver	Kenny Bell
Wide Receiver	Jordan Westerkamp
Wide Receiver	Quincy Enunwa
Tight End	Jake Long
Left Tackle	Brent Qvale
Left Guard	Jake Cotton
Center	Cole Pensick
Right Guard	Andrew Rodriguez
Right Tackle	Jeremiah Sirles

Position	Player
Defensive End	Jason Ankrah
Defensive Tackle	Thad Randle
Defensive Tackle	Maliek Collins
Defensive End	Randy Gregory
Linebacker	David Santos
Linebacker	Michael Rose
Linebacker	Zaire Anderson
Cornerback	Stanley Jean-Baptiste
Free Safety	Corey Cooper
Strong Safety	Andrew Green
Cornerback	Ciante Evans

== Individual honors ==
=== Big Ten Players of the Week ===
- Week 6 – Ameer Abdullah (Offensive Player of the Week)
- Week 10 – Jordan Westerkamp (Freshman of the Week)
- Week 11 – Randy Gregory (Defensive Player of the Week)
- Week 11 – Tommy Armstrong Jr. (Freshman of the Week)
- Week 13 – Pat Smith (Special Teams Player of the Week)

=== Big Ten All-Conference honors ===
All-Conference selections

Coaches
Position	Player
First Team Offense
RB	Ameer Abdullah
First Team Defense
DL	Randy Gregory
CB	Ciante Evans
Second Team Offense
C	Cole Pensick
Second Team Defense
DB	Stanley Jean-Baptiste
Honorable Mention
DL	Jason Ankrah
WR	Kenny Bell
DB	Corey Cooper
OL	Andrew Rodriguez
OL	Jeremiah Sirles

Media
Position	Player
First Team Offense
RB	Ameer Abdullah
First Team Defense
DL	Randy Gregory
Second Team Defense
DB	Ciante Evans
DB	Stanley Jean-Baptiste
Honorable Mention
DL	Jason Ankrah
WR	Kenny Bell
OL	Cole Pensick
OL	Andrew Rodriguez
DL	Jeremiah Sirles
PK	Pat Smith

=== All-Americans ===
- Ameer Abdullah (Associated Press – Third Team; Sports Illustrated – Honorable Mention; Phil Steele – Third Team)
- Spencer Long (CBS Sports – Third Team)

=== Academic All-Americans ===
- Spencer Long (First Team)
- Jake Long (Second Team)
- C.J. Zimmerer (Second Team)

=== Nebraska team awards ===
Year-end annual team awards:

- Team MVP: Ameer Abdullah
- Offensive MVP: Quincy Enunwa
- Defensive MVP: Randy Gregory
- Special Teams MVP: Pat Smith
- Offensive Captains: Quincy Enunwa, Spencer Long, Taylor Martinez, Ameer Abdullah
- Defensive Captains: Jason Ankrah, Ciante Evans
- Chamberlain Trophy: Jeremiah Sirles (Senior player that lives up to Cornhusker tradition)
- Novak Trophy: Ron Kellogg III (Senior player who exemplifies courage despite all odds)
- Fischer Native Son Award: Cole Pensick (Senior Nebraska native player)
- Bobby Reynolds Award: Jake Long
- Lifter of the Year: Ameer Abdullah
- Walk-On of the Year: Sam Burtch
- Offensive Scout Team MVP: Adam Taylor
- Defensive Scout Team MVP: Courtney Love
- Character Award: Taariq Allen, Mike Moudy, Scott Criss
- Pat Clare Award: Taariq Allen
- Husker Heart Award: Brandon Chapek

== Rankings ==
Ranking movements Legend: ██ Increase in ranking ██ Decrease in ranking — = Not ranked RV = Received votes
	Week																
Poll	Pre	1	2	3	4	5	6	7	8	9	10	11	12	13	14	15	Final
AP	18	22	23	RV	RV	RV	RV	RV	25	—	—	RV	RV	RV	—	—	RV
Coaches	18	19	15	RV	RV	25	24	21	21	RV	RV	RV	RV	RV	—	RV	25
Harris	Not released							23	23	RV	RV	RV	RV	RV	—	—	Not released
BCS	Not released								24	—	—	—	—	—	—	—	Not released

== Notes ==
- September 14, 2013 – A record crowd of 91,471 attended the game against UCLA
