= Spencer Long =

American football player (born 1990)

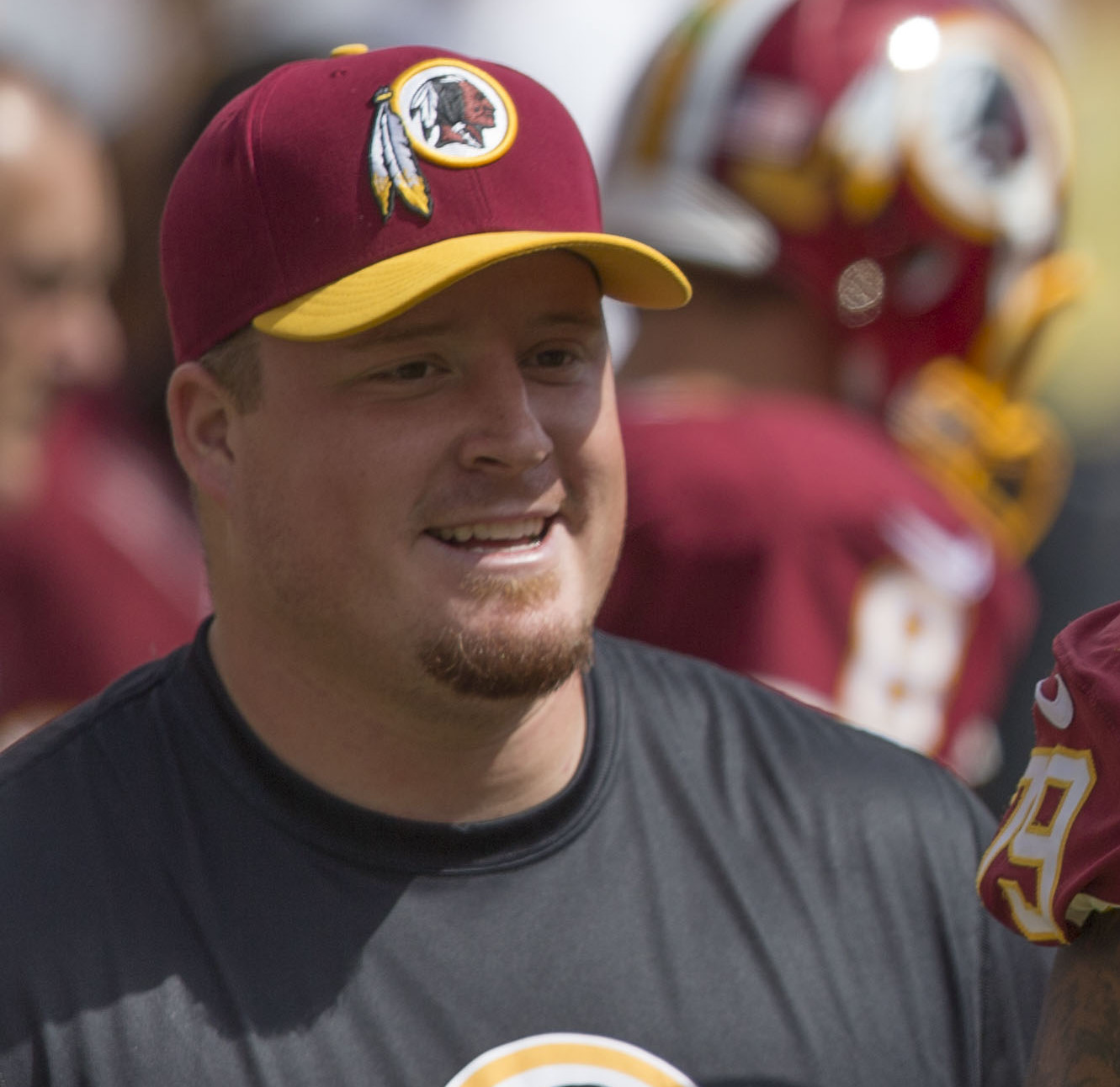
- Long with the Washington Redskins in 2015

No. 60, 61
- Position: Center

Personal information
- Born: November 8, 1990 (age 36); Omaha, Nebraska, U.S.
- Listed height: 6 ft 5 in (1.96 m)
- Listed weight: 318 lb (144 kg)

Career information
- High school: Elkhorn (Elkhorn, Nebraska)
- College: Nebraska
- NFL draft: 2014: 3rd round, 78th overall pick

Career history
- Washington Redskins (2014–2017); New York Jets (2018); Buffalo Bills (2019); San Francisco 49ers (2020)*
- * Offseason or practice squad member only

Awards and highlights
- Second-team All-American (2012); First-team All-Big Ten (2012); Second-team All-Big Ten (2011)

Career NFL statistics
- Games played: 67
- Games started: 44
- Stats at Pro Football Reference

Spencer Long (born November 8, 1990) is an American former professional football player who was a center in the National Football League (NFL). He played college football for the Nebraska Cornhuskers and was selected by the Washington Redskins in the third round of the 2014 NFL draft. He was also a member of the New York Jets, Buffalo Bills, and San Francisco 49ers.

== Early life ==
Long attended Elkhorn High School in Elkhorn, Nebraska. He played defensive end on the Antlers football team, and also played baseball.

== College career ==
At the University of Nebraska–Lincoln, he walked on to the Cornhuskers football team for the 2009 season. He redshirted in 2009, and did not appear in a game in 2010. In 2011, Long was one of three Nebraska offensive linemen to start in all of the Huskers' games. He also started in every game during the 2012 season. In 2013, he played in only six games before suffering a season-ending knee injury.

== Professional career ==
Pre-draft measurables
Height	Weight	Arm length	Hand span
6 ft 4 5/8 in (1.95 m)	320 lb (145 kg)	33 1/8 in (0.84 m)	10 3/4 in (0.27 m)
All values from NFL Combine

=== Washington Redskins ===
Long was selected by the Washington Redskins in the third round, 78th overall, of the 2014 NFL draft. On May 16, 2014, Long signed his four-year rookie contract, worth US$2.85 million.

With the release of former starting right guard, Chris Chester, Long was given the chance to compete for the starting position. He ended up losing out to Brandon Scherff, who originally was expected to become the starting right tackle. He would then become the starting left guard after regular starter, Shawn Lauvao, was placed on the team's injured reserve in September 2015. In 2016, Long became the team's starting center after a season-ending injury to Kory Lichtensteiger in week 3. On November 21, 2017, Long was placed on injured reserve after dealing with knee tendinitis.

=== New York Jets ===
On March 18, 2018, Long signed a four-year, $28 million contract with the New York Jets. He started 13 games in 2018 at center and left guard but was released on February 5, 2019.

=== Buffalo Bills ===
On February 12, 2019, Long signed a three-year $12.6 million contract with the Buffalo Bills. On March 10, 2020, Long's second-year option was exercised by the Bills. He was released on August 4, 2020.

=== San Francisco 49ers ===
Long was signed by the San Francisco 49ers on August 13, 2020, but announced his retirement three days later.
