= Trevor Roach =

American football player (born 1992)

No. 52
- Position: Linebacker

Personal information
- Born: March 6, 1992 (age 34); Omaha, Nebraska, U.S.
- Listed height: 6 ft 2 in (1.88 m)
- Listed weight: 247 lb (112 kg)

Career information
- High school: Elkhorn (Elkhorn, Nebraska)
- College: Nebraska
- NFL draft: 2015: undrafted

Career history
- Cincinnati Bengals (2015–2016)

Career NFL statistics
- Total tackles: 1
- Stats at Pro Football Reference

Trevor Roach (born March 6, 1992) is an American former professional football player who was a linebacker for the Cincinnati Bengals of the National Football League (NFL). He played college football for the Nebraska Cornhuskers. He was signed by the Bengals as an undrafted free agent in 2015.

== Early life ==
Roach played high school football as a linebacker and running back at Elkhorn High School in Omaha, Nebraska. He missed most of his junior year due to an injury suffered during the season's first game. He recorded 100 tackles while also rushing for 1,042 yards and 17 touchdowns his senior season in 2009. He earned First Team All-Nebraska honors from the Omaha World-Herald and Second Team Super State honors from the Lincoln Journal Star.

Roach received scholarship offers from Northwest Missouri State and Nebraska-Omaha and a walk-on invitation from Iowa State. He decided to walk on at Nebraska.

== College career ==
Roach played for the Nebraska Cornhuskers of the University of Nebraska–Lincoln from 2011 to 2014 as a linebacker. In 2010, he was redshirted and spent time with the scout team. He played in five games as a redshirt freshman in 2011, recording seven tackles. He missed time due to injury during the second half of the season. He appeared in six games in 2012, totaling five tackles and half a sack. He missed the entire 2013 season due to a Lisfranc injury. He played in all eleven of the Cornhuskers' regular season games in 2014 and started the final six regular season games. He did not play in the 2014 Holiday Bowl due to a foot injury. He finished the 2014 season with totals of 63 tackles, a sack, two fumble recoveries and a forced fumble. His 18 tackles against Michigan State were the most by any Cornhuskers player in 2014. He also had four tackles for loss against Michigan State, which was a team high for the year as well.

Roach recorded 75 tackles during his college career. He earned Academic All-Big Ten accolades in 2011, 2012, and 2014. He graduated in December 2014 with a degree in finance/management.

== Professional career ==
Pre-draft measurables
| Height | Weight | 40-yard dash | 10-yard split | 20-yard split | 20-yard shuttle | Three-cone drill | Vertical jump | Broad jump | Bench press |
|---|---|---|---|---|---|---|---|---|---|
| 6 ft 2 in (1.88 m) | 237 lb (108 kg) | 4.80 s | 1.55 s | 2.75 s | 4.21 s | 6.80 s | 35 1/2 in (0.90 m) | 10 ft 0 in (3.05 m) | 25 reps |
All values from Nebraska Pro Day

Roach signed with the Cincinnati Bengals on May 8, 2015 after going undrafted in the 2015 NFL draft. He was released by the team on September 5 and signed to the Bengals' practice squad the next day. On January 4, 2016, he was promoted to the active roster as a replacement for the injured Emmanuel Lamur. Roach played in the AFC Wildcard game against the Pittsburgh Steelers on January 9, 2016 and recorded a special teams tackle.

He was released by the Bengals on September 29 and signed to the team's practice squad on September 30. He was promoted back to the active roster on December 27, 2016. He played in four games during the 2016 season and recorded one solo tackle.

On February 10. 2017, Roach announced his retirement from the NFL after two seasons at the age of 24.

== Personal life ==
Roach participated in outreach activities while with the Cornhuskers. He was on the Tom Osborne Citizenship Team and the Brook Berringer Citizenship Team. He also earned a Nebraska Student-Athlete HERO Leadership Award his senior year.
