= Metropolitan Athletic Conference (Nebraska) =

American high school athletics conference

Metropolitan Athletic Conference is a major high school athletic conference, constituted of Class A schools, primarily located in the Omaha metropolitan area, and governed by the Nebraska School Activities Association (NSAA).

== History ==
An initial discussion in 1957 led to conference beginnings with "minor sports" competitions in 1958 for Lincoln and Omaha teams, with tentative plans for football and basketball, on a loop basis, suggested for 1960. In November 1963, superintendents, principals and activities directors of fourteen Class A schools (Lincoln High, Northeast, Southeast, Omaha South, Benson, Central, Westside, Tech, North, Creighton Prep, Bishop Ryan, Bellevue, Hastings and Grand Island) met to review an October draft proposal, discussing formation of "a metropolitan athletic conference". In 1968, Bellevue and Creighton Prep were assigned to "Omaha Metropolitan division athletic conference", and Bishop Rummel and Burke went to "the American division".

In 1983, the Board of Education of Fremont, Nebraska, voted to "save taxpayers more than $5,000 a year... by applying for membership in the Omaha-based Metropolitan Conference".

== 2026 List of Schools in the Metro Conference ==
- Bellevue East High School
- Bellevue West High School
- Creighton Preparatory School
- Elkhorn North High School
- Elkhorn South High School
- Millard North High School
- Millard South High School
- Millard West High School
- Omaha Benson High School
- Omaha Bryan High School
- Omaha Buena Vista High School
- Omaha Burke High School
- Omaha Central High School
- Omaha Marian High School
- Omaha North High School
- Omaha Northwest High School
- Omaha South High School
- Omaha Westside High School
- Omaha Westview High School
- Papillion-La Vista Senior High School
- Papillion-La Vista South High School
