= Metropolitan Conference =

Metropolitan Conference or Metro Conference may refer to:

- Met-Intercollegiate Conference, NCAA Division III conference from 1979 to 1984
- Metropolitan Athletic Conference (Nebraska) NSAA Class A conference from 1968 to Present
- Metro Conference (1975–1995) (Metropolitan Collegiate Athletic Conference), NCAA Division I conference that was one of the two predecessors to Conference USA
- Metro Conference (2026–), current NCAA Division I conference and a separate entity from the conference of the same name that existed from 1975–1995; formerly known as the Metro Atlantic Athletic Conference from its founding in 1980 until 2026
- Metro Conference, the original name of the North East Collegiate Volleyball Association, NCAA Division III men's volleyball-only conference from 1995 to 2011
- Metro Conference (Wisconsin), a high school sports league in the Milwaukee metropolitan area from 1974 to 1997
- Metropolitan Conference (1923–1931), college football conference in New York from 1923 to 1931
- Metropolitan Conference (California), junior college athletic conference in California formed in 1938
- Metropolitan Collegiate Conference, NCAA conference from 1965 to 1969
- Metropolitan Collegiate Hockey Conference, ACHA Division 3 league, originally formed 1967–68
- Metropolitan Intercollegiate Conference, NCAA Division III conference from 1972 to 1977
- Metropolitan Interscholastic Conference, high school athletic conference based in central and western Indiana, est. 1996
- Metropolitan New York Conference, NCAA conference from 1933 to 1963
- Metropolitan Swimming Conference, intercollegiate swimming conference, c. 2007–2014
- ECAC-Metro Conference, former name of the NEC, historically known as the Northeast Conference
