= Elkhorn South High School =

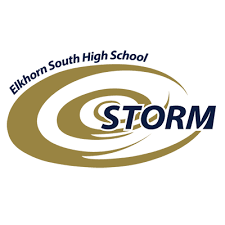

Location
- 20303 Blue Sage Parkway; Omaha, Nebraska 68130; United States; 41°14′33″N 96°13′57.5″W

Information
- School district: Elkhorn Public Schools
- Principal: Jed Givens
- Teaching staff: 87.21 (on an FTE basis)
- Enrollment: 1,407 (2023-2024)
- Student to teacher ratio: 16.13
- Colors: Navy and Vegas gold
- Team name: Storm
- Website: elkhornweb.org/schools/eshs/

Elkhorn South High School is a public high school located in Omaha, Nebraska. Opening in 2010, the school serves students grades 9 through 12 and is one of three traditional high schools operated by Elkhorn Public Schools.

== History ==
Serious talks about the addition of an Elkhorn Public Schools high school began in November 2004, when the school board voted to pay $100,000 for an 8-year option to purchase a 63-acre (25 ha; 250,000 m^{2}) parcel near 204th and Pacific Streets for a price of $48,000 per acre. These funds were raised by bonds passed by voters in 2002 and 2004. This would become the site of Elkhorn's second high school, later named Elkhorn South High School. Two years later, in the November 2006 election, voters approved a $96 million bond that would fund the school's construction. In August 2007, the Elkhorn School Board approved the school's new name: Elkhorn South High School. In addition, they also voted that the school's colors would be navy and gold with the mascot being the Storm. These were recommended to the Board by a 15-person committee that was tasked with narrowing a list of 35 community-submitted potential names.

Construction on Elkhorn South began in April 2008. At the time, the school's estimated building cost was $40.5 million, and would be built to hold 1,000 students. The school was designed by the DLR Group and its architecture was inspired by schools in Kansas City and Lincoln. The board named Mark Kalvoda as principal in January 2009. When the school opened, students living south of West Dodge Road would attend Elkhorn South High School while students north of Dodge would remain at Elkhorn High School, the district's first high school. Elkhorn South's boundary has not changed to date.

Elkhorn South's doors opened to 610 ninth through eleventh graders in August 2010. The graduating class of the 2010–2011 school year remained at Elkhorn High School, making the class of 2012 the first graduating class of Elkhorn South. Elkhorn South's student population continued to grow, and by 2014, the school reached 1,074 students, surpassing the capacity of 1,000. That year the Board of Education asked voters to pass a $63.1 million bond that would cover the cost of a 500-student addition to the school. The bond was passed, and construction on the addition began in spring 2015. The addition opened to students and staff in the fall of 2016.

In 2020, Elkhorn's newest high school, Elkhorn North High School, opened near 180th and West Maple Road. Elkhorn South's boundary was not affected by the opening, and the school continues to serve all Elkhorn students south of West Dodge Road. Mark Kalvoda served as principal from 2010 to 2025, and he has been replaced by Jed Givens.

== Demographics ==
According to the Nebraska Department of Education, during the 2021–2022 school year, the school had 1,417 students. Approximately 89.7% of students identify as white and about 10.3% identify as one or more other races. The state reports that 66.75% of teachers at the school possess a master's degree. The school is located in Elkhorn, a large suburb of Omaha, Nebraska.

== Academics ==
ESHS offers dual enrollment classes with the University of Nebraska Omaha.

== Athletics ==
Elkhorn South athletic teams are nicknamed the Storm and compete in the Metropolitan High School Activities Association.

State Championships
| Sport | Year(s) |
|---|---|
| Cross Country (boys) | |
| Cross Country (girls) | 2015 |
| Football | 2015, 2016 |
| Golf (girls) | 2011, 2012, 2014, 2017 |
| Softball | 2016 |
| Tennis (boys) | 2011, 2012, 2017 |
| Volleyball | 2020 |
| Basketball (boys) | 2015 |
| Basketball (girls) | 2016 |
| Swimming & Diving (boys) | |
| Swimming & Diving (girls) | |
| Wrestling | |
| Baseball | |
| Golf (boys) | |
| Soccer (boys) | 2017 |
| Soccer (girls) | 2015, 2019 |
| Tennis (girls) | 2011, 2015, 2016, 2017, 2023 |
| Track & Field (boys) | 2013, 2021 |
| Track & Field (girls) | |

== Performing arts ==
Elkhorn South has three competitive show choirs: the mixed-gender "Blackout" and "Power Surge" as well as the all-female "Shockwave". The program also hosts an annual competition, the "Crystal Cup".

Elkhorn South also has two competitive jazz bands: "Blue Sage" and "Parkway."
