= Kade Pieper =

American football player (born 2005)

No. 58 – Iowa Hawkeyes
- Position: Center
- Class: Redshirt Junior

Personal information
- Born: February 18, 2005 (age 21)
- Listed height: 6 ft 4 in (1.93 m)
- Listed weight: 290 lb (132 kg)

Career information
- High school: Norfolk Catholic (Norfolk, Nebraska)
- College: Iowa (2023–present)

Awards and highlights
- Joe Moore Award (2025) (Note: As part of the Iowa Hawkeyes offensive line); Third-team All-Big Ten (2025)
- Stats at ESPN

Kade Pieper (born February 18, 2005) is an American college football center for the Iowa Hawkeyes.

== Early life ==
Pieper attended Norfolk Catholic High School in Norfolk, Nebraska. He played both offensive and defensive line in high school. He was district MVP as a senior after recording 130 tackles. Pieper originally committed to play college football at North Dakota State University before flipping his commitment to the University of Iowa. He also won a state title in shot put his senior year.

== College career ==
Pieper played in two games and redshirted his first year at Iowa in 2023 and played in 11 games as a backup in 2024. In 2025, he entered the season as the team's starting right guard. He started all 13 games, was named third-team All-Big ten, and was part of the group who received the Joe Moore Award. Prior to the 2026 season, Pieper was named the Associated Press preseason first-team All-American at center.
