= Jason Ankrah =

American football player (born 1991)

No. 91, 96
- Position: Linebacker

Personal information
- Born: February 26, 1991 (age 35); Montgomery Village, Maryland, U.S.
- Listed height: 6 ft 3 in (1.91 m)
- Listed weight: 262 lb (119 kg)

Career information
- High school: Quince Orchard (Gaithersburg, Maryland)
- College: Nebraska (2009–2013)
- NFL draft: 2014: undrafted

Career history
- Houston Texans (2014); Tennessee Titans (2015)*; Ottawa Redblacks (2017)
- * Offseason or practice squad member only

Career NFL statistics
- Total tackles: 1
- Stats at Pro Football Reference
- Stats at CFL.ca

Jason Ankrah (born February 26, 1991) is an American former professional football player who was a linebacker in the National Football League (NFL) and Canadian Football League (CFL). He played college football for the Nebraska Cornhuskers. He was a member of the Houston Texans, Tennessee Titans and Ottawa Redblacks.

== Early life ==
Ankrah played high school football at Quince Orchard High School in Gaithersburg, Maryland. He recorded 55 tackles and seven sacks his senior year. The Cougars finished with ten wins and two losses, advancing to the Maryland 4A West Regional Final. He was also named first-team all-state as a senior. He recorded 50 tackles and 5 sacks his junior year. The Cougars finished undefeated with 14 wins and won the class 4A state championship.

== College career ==
Ankrah played football for the Cornhuskers at the University of Nebraska–Lincoln from 2010 to 2013. He was redshirted in 2009.

== Professional career ==
Pre-draft measurables
Height	Weight	40-yard dash	10-yard split	20-yard split	20-yard shuttle	Three-cone drill	Vertical jump	Broad jump	Bench press
6 ft 3 in (1.91 m)	262 lb (119 kg)	4.77 s	1.63 s	2.72 s	4.38 s	7.02 s	30 in (0.76 m)	8 ft 10 in (2.69 m)	20 reps
All values from Nebraska Pro Day

Ankrah was signed by the Houston Texans on May 16, 2014, after going undrafted in the 2014 NFL draft. He made his NFL debut on September 14, 2014 against the Oakland Raiders, recording one tackle. He was released by the Texans on August 31, 2015.

Ankrah was signed to the Tennessee Titans' practice squad on September 9, 2015.

On January 26, 2017, Ankrah signed with the Ottawa Redblacks as a defensive lineman. He played in two games for the Redblacks during the 2017 season. He was released by the team on July 3, 2017.

== Coaching ==
In 2019, Ankrah became head coach of Central High School in Schuyler, Nebraska. In 2023, he became the head coach of Great Mills High School in Great Mills, Maryland.
