= Elkhorn, Omaha, Nebraska =

Elkhorn
- Neighborhood of Omaha
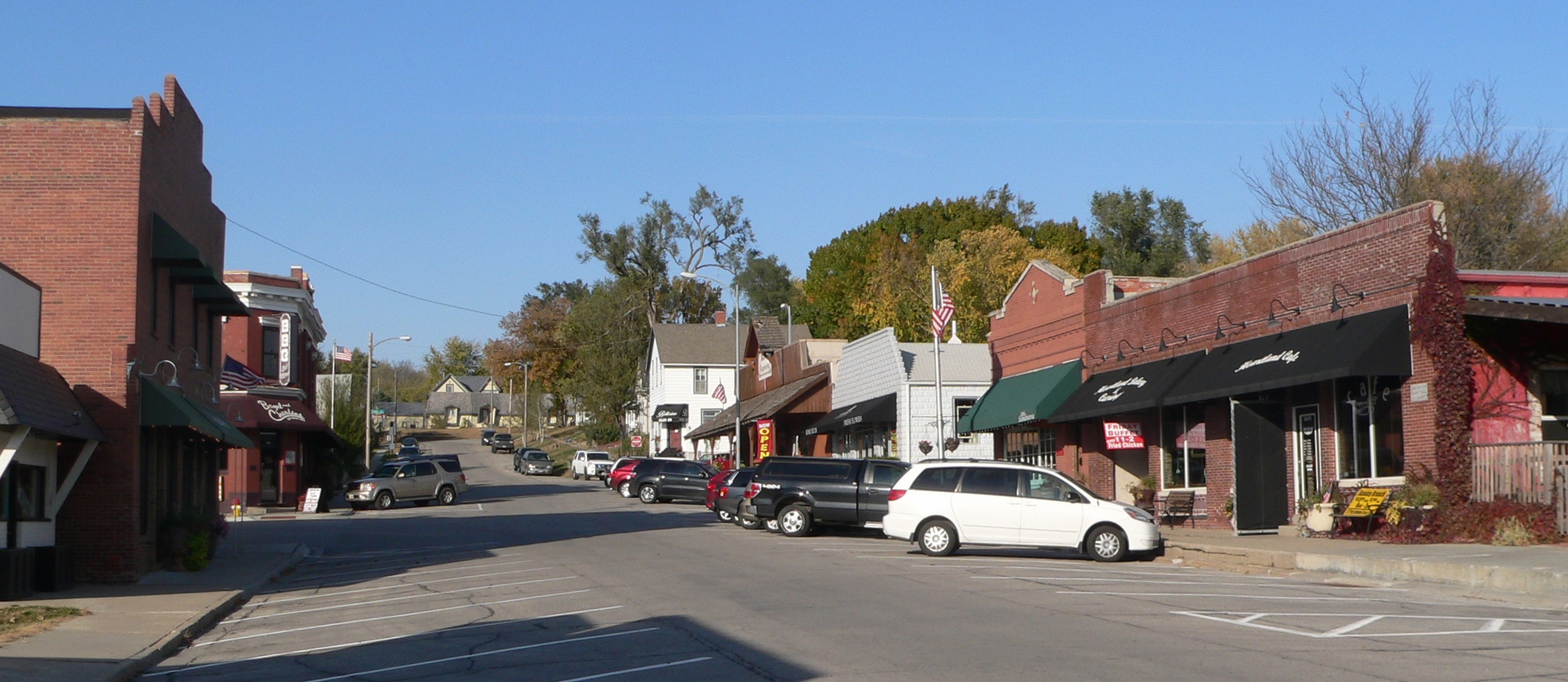
- Downtown Elkhorn: Main Street, looking north

- Location of Elkhorn prior to annexation
- Coordinates: 41°16′43″N 96°14′21″W
- Country: United States
- State: Nebraska
- County: Douglas
- Named for: Elkhorn River

Area
  - Total: 3.8 sq mi (9.8 km^{2})
  - Land: 3.7 sq mi (9.7 km^{2})
  - Water: 0.039 sq mi (0.1 km^{2})
- Elevation: 1,210 ft (370 m)

Population (2000)
  - Total: 6,062
  - Estimate (2005): 8,192
  - Density: 1,620/sq mi (625.3/km^{2})
- Time zone: UTC-6 (Central (CST))
  - Summer (DST): UTC-5 (CDT)
- ZIP code: 68022
- Area code: 402
- FIPS code: 31-15080
- GNIS feature ID: 0829062

Elkhorn is a western neighborhood of the city of Omaha, Nebraska, United States. The population was 6,062 at the 2000 census and was estimated by the Census Bureau at 8,192 in 2005 before it was annexed into Omaha in 2007. It was named after the Elkhorn River. Elkhorn was founded in 1865, platted in 1867, and was incorporated in 1872. It later became uncharted before re-incorporating in 1886. In the 1990s, Elkhorn began annexing municipalities near itself to avoid annexation from Omaha. However, in 2007, Omaha annexed the city.

== History ==
=== As an independent municipality (1865–2005) ===
Elkhorn was founded in 1865. It was platted in 1867 when the Union Pacific Railroad was extended to that point. Elkhorn was first incorporated in 1872. However, after a period of financial struggles, Elkhorn became unchartered. Elkhorn was incorporated again on December 30, 1886. In April 1895, a fire started in Main Street, causing ten buildings to be damaged and a loss of $28,000. The fire was started due to a Union Pacific train engine.

In 1993, Elkhorn attempted to annex Chapel Hill. The annexation was blocked by two Chapel Hill residents after filing a lawsuit against Elkhorn. In 1995, their arguments were rejected by the Nebraska Supreme Court and the annexation was approved. Annexations were done primarily to avoid annexation by Omaha. Municipalities with a population of less than 10,000 could be annexed by larger cities.

In May 1996, it was announced that Elkhorn would be annexing Rogers Ridge, Ramblewood, Quail Ridge I and II, Skyline Oaks I and II, Wadsworth, and Wright Subdivisions. These annexations would increase Elkhorns population from 3,800 to 5,000. In August 2001, Elkhorn annexed Greenbrier, Arbor Ridge, Fair Meadows, Winterburn, and Nrohkl. By 2004, Elkhorn had reached a reported population of 7,500 people.

=== Annexation (2005–2007) ===
Elkhorn was an independent municipality until it was annexed by the City of Omaha in 2005. In an attempt to prevent the annexation, Elkhorn almost simultaneously annexed several surrounding subdivisions in an attempt to bring the city's population above 10,000 citizens; a 1917 state law limits Omaha's annexation power to neighboring communities not over 10,000 in population. On January 12, 2007, the Nebraska Supreme Court ruled in favor of Omaha, saying "…we conclude that Elkhorn ceased to exist as a separate municipality on March 24, 2005, the date that Omaha's annexation ordinance became effective." The United States Supreme Court denied Elkhorn's request to hear the case on February 22, 2007.

Omaha Mayor Mike Fahey said he tried for years to work with Elkhorn, whereby Elkhorn would not be annexed if the city did no further annexing of its own. Elkhorn representatives did not consider that a fair proposal and refused. Omaha began the process of annexing Elkhorn. The two municipalities went to court as Elkhorn attempted to block the forcible annexation by Omaha. It was not until after losing the first round in the courts that Elkhorn offered to reach an agreement with Omaha. Omaha, having won in the courts and already financially invested in the court fights, refused to deal with Elkhorn and continued the annexation process.

The final Elkhorn city council meeting was held February 27, 2007. Elkhorn ceased to be an independent municipality on March 1, 2007.

=== As a neighborhood of Omaha (2007–present) ===
On April 26, 2024, Elkhorn was struck by a large, long-tracked EF4 tornado. Hundreds of homes and businesses were damaged or destroyed.

== Demographics ==
=== 2000 census ===
As of the census of 2000, there were 6,062 people, 2,000 households, and 1,681 families residing in Elkhorn. The population density was 1,619.4 inhabitants per square mile (625.3/km^{2}). There were 2,034 housing units at an average density of 543.4 per square mile (209.8/km^{2}). The racial makeup of the area was 98.75% White, 0.13% African American, 0.25% Native American, 0.33% Asian, 0.20% from other races, and 0.35% from two or more races. Hispanic or Latino people of any race were 1.27% of the population.

There were 2,000 households, out of which 46.3% had children under the age of 18 living with them, 73.8% were married couples living together, 7.6% had a female householder with no husband present, and 16.0% were non-families. 13.7% of all households were made up of individuals, and 4.4% had someone living alone who was 65 years of age or older. The average household size was 2.97 and the average family size was 3.28.

The median income for a household in Elkhorn was $67,234, and the median income for a family was $76,206. Males had a median income of $52,361, versus $31,655 for females. The per capita income for Elkhorn was $29,129. About 1.6% of families and 2.1% of the population were below the poverty line, including 3.0% of those under age 18 and 4.2% of those age 65 or over.

== Education ==
Elkhorn Public Schools is the main school district in Elkhorn. Elkhorn has fourteen elementary schools, five middle schools, and three high schools. Elkhorn's three public high schools are Elkhorn North High School, Elkhorn High School, and Elkhorn South High School.
