= Pauline Johnson Collegiate & Vocational School =

High school in Brantford, Ontario, Canada

Coordinates: 43.13939°N 80.23927°W

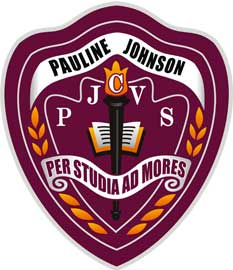
- Pauline Collegiate crest

Location
- 627 Colberne St E Brantford, Ontario; Canada

Information
- Founded: 1955
- School board: Grand Erie District School Board
- Principal: Griffen Cobb
- Enrollment: 795 (2019/2020)
- Colors: Maroon, White, and Grey
- Mascot: Thunderbird

Pauline Johnson Collegiate & Vocational School in Brantford, Ontario, Canada is a composite high school with collegiate and vocational departments. It was named in honour of the Canadian First Nations poet E. Pauline Johnson, who was born nearby.

The school was officially opened on October 18, 1955. In 1960, the fine new vocational wing was opened for use by the Technical and Commercial Departments making possible a full composite school. A second addition was completed in 1963. In 1971, a new addition provided more facilities.

As of June 15, 2016 the school is also home of the Kiwanis Field, which is now the home turf of the Thunderbirds. This field was "Brantford’s first state-of-the-art, multi-purpose athletic facility with a full size Canadian football, soccer, lacrosse and rugby synthetic turf playing field and an 8-lane rubberized track (with steeplechase hurdles) as its focal point. Rounding out the facilities, other features are two long jump/ triple jump pits, pole vault area, a shot put area and one high jump approach.".

== See also ==
- Education in Ontario
- List of secondary schools in Ontario
