= Norfolk Catholic High School =

Catholic high school in Nebraska, US

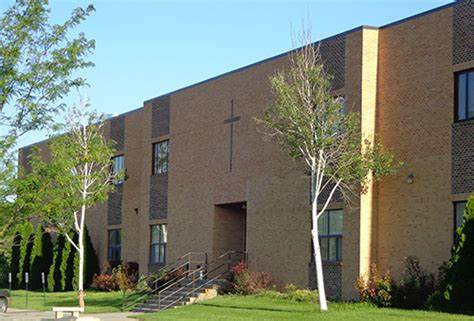

Location
- 2300 Madison Avenue; Norfolk, (Madison County), Nebraska 68701-4456; United States; 42°1′54″N 97°26′33″W

Information
- Type: Private, parochial, coeducational
- Religious affiliation: Catholic Church
- Established: 1926
- Founder: Sisters of Saint Francis
- Status: Operational
- President: Fr. Patrick McLaughlin
- Administrator: Amy Wattier
- Chaplain: Fr. Pat Mclaughlin & Fr. Gregory Carl
- Teaching staff: 14.9 (on an FTE basis) (2023–24)
- Grades: 7–12
- Student to teacher ratio: 15.1
- Colors: Red and white
- Slogan: "Walking With You to Meet Jesus"
- Athletics conference: NSAA
- Mascot: Knight
- Team name: Knights
- Accreditation: North Central Association of Colleges and Schools
- Website: sacredheartnorfolk.com/school

Norfolk Catholic Jr./Sr. High School is a parochial Catholic high school located in Norfolk, Nebraska, United States. It is affiliated with Sacred Heart Parish in the Archdiocese of Omaha. Founded in 1926 by Father Daniel Moriarity, the school was originally located at 6th Street and Madison Avenue. In 1961, a separate three-year high school was formed at the current location (24th and Madison Avenue). The 9th grade became part of the high school in 1976.

== Extracurricular activities ==
=== Nebraska State Championships (51) ===
- Track and field (boys') - 2007, 2017, 2019
- Basketball (girls') - 2008
- Basketball (boys') - 2011
- Cross country (boys') - 2006, 2007, 2008, 2009, 2016
- Drama (one-act play) - 1975, 1979, 1981, 1982, 1983, 1984, 1987, 1989, 1990, 1992, 1993, 2004
- Football - 1983, 1991, 1998, 1999, 2004, 2005, 2010, 2011, 2012, 2017, 2022, 2023, 2024
- Golf (boys') - 1973, 1974, 1976
- Golf (girls') - 2001, 2005
- Speech - 1978, 1979, 1980, 1981, 1982, 1983, 1984, 1987, 1988,
- Wrestling - 2005, 2006

=== Nebraska state records ===
- Drama - most Drama championships (12)
- Football - most State championships (12)
- Football - most touchdown passes in a game, Chris Jessen, 6, vs. Stanton (1999)
- Football - most interceptions in a season, Aaron Hughes, 18 (1991)
- Football - most interceptions in a game, Aaron Hughes, 5 (1991)
- Football - most field goals in a playoff series, Tyler Daake, 5 (2006)
- Football - longest field goal in a playoff game, Drew Farlee, 57 yd. vs. Wahoo High (2010)
- Football - longest punt return in a playoff game, Devin Neal, 88 yd. vs. North Bend Central (2008)
- Football - most state championship victories in a row, 3 (2010-2012)

== Notable alumni ==
- Kade Pieper (2023), college football guard for the Iowa Hawkeyes
