= School classification =

Categorisation of schools for athletic competition

School classification is the categorization of secondary schools by officially sanctioned bodies for athletic competition. Across North America, the classes have often been based on enrollment levels of the schools, with many leagues using classifications named A, AA, AAA, etc.

== Classes ==
Classification of secondary schools is performed by officially sanctioned bodies to attempt to provide an equitable grouping of potential talent for athletic competition. Across North America, the classes have often been based on enrollment levels of the schools, with many leagues using classifications named A, AA, AAA, etc., with the number of As denoting schools with larger enrollment, but alternative schemes are also employed. Schools may be placed in different classes for different sports (e.g., A for football and AA for baseball).

== See also ==
- National Federation of State High School Associations § Member associations
- Ontario Federation of School Athletic Associations
- PIAA class
