= Elkhorn North High School =

Location
- 17800 George Miller Parkway; Omaha, Nebraska 68116; United States; 41.2984°N 96.1941°W

Information
- Type: Public secondary
- Established: 2020
- School district: Elkhorn Public Schools
- Principal: Dan Radicia
- Faculty: 117
- Teaching staff: 63.65 (FTE)
- Grades: 9-12
- Enrollment: 1,050 (2024–2025)
- Student to teacher ratio: 15.76
- Colors: Columbia blue, black, silver
- Athletics conference: Metropolitan Athletic Conference
- Mascot: Wolfie
- Nickname: Wolves
- Rival: Elkhorn High School
- Newspaper: North Howler
- Yearbook: the IMPRINT
- Website: www.elkhornweb.org/enhs/

Elkhorn North High School is a public high school located in Omaha, Nebraska. The school serves students in grades 9 through 12 and is one of three traditional high schools operated by Elkhorn Public Schools.

== History ==
After targeting a parcel of land near 180th Street and West Maple Road for a potential third high school, Elkhorn Public Schools made three offers to buy the parcel from a development group, and when all were rejected, exercised eminent domain in 2017 in order to acquire the land. A successful mail-in referendum in March 2018 authorized EPS to build the third high school, which was expected to draw students mainly from Elkhorn High School. In September, school officials revealed a columbia blue, black and silver color scheme with a wolf mascot, chosen over eagles and nighthawks, the former already being in use by Elkhorn Grandview Middle, and the latter later being chosen for Elkhorn North Ridge Middle. Construction began the following month; at that time, the estimated cost was $78.5 million. Boundaries for the school were released in early 2019, confirming that the school would draw entirely from former Elkhorn territory.

The school opened for classes in fall 2020 with students in grades 9-11; that year's juniors formed the first senior class following the 2021–22 school year.

The school's zoning draws all students from the northeastern corner of the district. At 204th Street and Fort Street is where the boundary stops there. The southern border there is made up by Fort to 192nd Street, where that is the western border until West Maple Road. The boundary then goes south to West Dodge Road and goes back north at 168th Street along the border of the district.

== Facilities ==
The original Elkhorn North building was constructed to serve 1,200 students with an area of 254,000 square feet. In fall of 2026, the 600 student expansion was completed with the construction of the I-Wing.

== Academics ==
Elkhorn North offers dual enrollment classes through the University of Nebraska Omaha

== Athletics ==
ENHS athletic teams compete in the Metropolitan Athletic Conference. Before Metro, the Wolves competed in the Eastern Midlands Conference.

== Performing Arts ==
Elkhorn North has three competitive show choirs stylized as momENtum (Junior Varsity), ENcore (Treble), and adrENaline(Varsity). They also host the competition Northern Lights every year in late January or early February.

Elkhorn North also has a competitive marching band, Sound of the Wolfpack. They also have two jazz bands in Alphatones and the Big Band Wolves.

== Notable Alumni ==
- Barry Fries, men's college american football player for South Dakota State
- Britt Prince, women's college basketball player for Nebraska
