= Elkhorn Public Schools =

School district in Omaha, Nebraska

Elkhorn Public Schools is a school district headquartered in Elkhorn, Omaha, Nebraska. Across 22 schools, the district currently services over 11,000 students in northwest Omaha and Elkhorn. The current superintendent is Dr. Bary Habrock, though Habrock will retire following the 2026-27 school year and will be replaced by Dr. Don Pechous.

== History ==
In 1930, EPS opened their current administration building as a K-12 school. This was their only school until the opening of Westridge Elementary in 1961.

In 1967, the district opened Elkhorn Junior/Senior High School, known today as Elkhorn Middle School.

In 1975, Skyline Elementary opened, followed by Hillrise four years later.

In 1980, Elkhorn High School opened, and ending high school at now Elkhorn Middle School.

School-wise, the count stayed stagnant until 2000, when Spring Ridge Elementary opened at the turn of the century.

In 2003, Elkhorn added a new middle school, Elkhorn Ridge Middle School, alleviating Elkhorn Middle's overcrowding.

2005 brought Fire Ridge Elementary, and Manchester Elementary opened the year after.

In 2006 a $96 million bond referendum was given to the voters.

In 2010, Elkhorn South High School opened its doors, and West Dodge Station Elementary also opened. Elkhorn Valley View Middle opened the year after.

In 2013, West Bay and Sagewood Elementary both opened, followed by Elkhorn Grandview Middle the next year. Also in 2014, a $63.1 million bond was approved by voters.

Steve Baker served as the superintendent from 2008 until his June 30, 2017 retirement. During his period the number of students increased by 75%. Bary Habrock began as superintendent on July 1, 2017.

2016 marked the opening of Arbor View Elementary, financed by the $63.1 million bond.

In 2017 the district had 8,386 students.

In 2018 the district put a $149.6 bond up for a referendum to the district's voters. This included the addition of a new elementary school, Elkhorn North Ridge Middle School, and Elkhorn North High School.

2020 marked the opening of Elkhorn North and Woodbrook Elementary.

In August 2021, construction of Elkhorn North Ridge Middle School was completed and they began their first year.

In 2023, the district put a $122 million bond up for a referendum to the district's voters. This included two new elementary schools. Iron Bluff and Stone Pointe Elementary opened in 2025.

== Schools ==
All numbers are based on NCES statistics from the 2024-25 school year.

High schools

All high schools are grades 9-12.

School	Mascot	Location	Principal	Enrollment	Opened
Elkhorn High School	Antlers	1401 Veterans Drive	Mark Schroder	769	1980
Elkhorn North High School	Wolves	17800 George Miller Parkway	Dan Radicia	1,050	2020
Elkhorn South High School	Storm	20303 Blue Sage Parkway	Jed Givens	1,434	2010

Middle schools

All middle schools are grades 6-8.

School	Mascot	Location	Principal	Enrollment	Opened
Elkhorn Middle School	Antlers	3200 North 207th Plaza	Jennifer Allgood	631	1967
Elkhorn Grandview Middle School	Wolves	17801 Grand Avenue	Rebecca Stichler	520	2014
Elkhorn North Ridge Middle School	Nighthawks	18330 Purple Martin Avenue	Kelsi Mitteis	424	2021
Elkhorn Ridge Middle School	Storm	17880 Marcy Street	Tanner Schutt	576	2003
Elkhorn Valley View Middle School	Storm	1313 South 208th Street	Kelly Apel	679	2011

Elementary schools

All elementary schools are grades K-5.

School	Mascot	Location	Principal	Enrollment	Opened
Arbor View Elementary School	Explorers	5115 North 208th Street	Troy Sidders	555	2016
Blue Sage Elementary School	Blue Bears	3600 South 215th Street	Amy Christ	664	2018
Fire Ridge Elementary School	Falcons	19660 Farnam Street	Joy Fuller	469	2005
Hillrise Elementary School	Huskies	20110 Hopper Street	Melissa Mehlmann	321	1979
Iron Bluff Elementary School	Bulldogs	4545 George B. Lake Parkway	Ryan Broshar		2025
Manchester Elementary School	Mountain Lions	2750 North HWS Cleveland Boulevard	Sarah Addink	444	2006
Sagewood Elementary School	Timberwolves	4910 North 177th Street	Tanner Zabrowski	447	2013
Skyline Elementary School	Stallions	400 South 210th Street	Alex Bousema	370	1975
Spring Ridge Elementary School	Eagles	17830 Shadow Ridge Drive	Kelli Hayworth	474	2000
Stone Pointe Elementary School	Panthers	6204 North 195th Street	Laurinda Petersen		2025
West Bay Elementary School	Bengals	3220 South 188th Avenue	Amber Scott	405	2013
West Dodge Station Elementary School	Express	18480 California Street	Benji Hoegh	434	2010
Westridge Elementary School	Wildcats	3100 North 206th Street	Amy Askew	346	1961
Woodbrook Elementary School	Bobcats	18520 Purple Martin Parkway	Kristi Mulliner	641	2020
