= 2009 Purdue Boilermakers football team =

American college football season

2009 Purdue Boilermakers football
- Conference: Big Ten Conference
- Record: 5–7 (4–4 Big Ten)
- Head coach: Danny Hope (1st season)
- Offensive coordinator: Gary Nord (1st season)
- Offensive scheme: Spread
- Defensive coordinator: Donn Landholm (1st season)
- Base defense: 4–3
- Captain: 5: Joey Elliott; Mike Neal; Jason Werner; Torri Williams; Jared Zwilling
- Home stadium: Ross–Ade Stadium (Capacity: 62,500)

2009 Big Ten Conference football standings
	Conf.			Overall
Team	W		L	W		L
No. 5 Ohio State $	7	–	1	11	–	2
No. 7 Iowa %	6	–	2	11	–	2
No. 9 Penn State	6	–	2	11	–	2
Northwestern	5	–	3	8	–	5
No. 16 Wisconsin	5	–	3	10	–	3
Michigan State	4	–	4	6	–	7
Purdue	4	–	4	5	–	7
Minnesota	3	–	5	6	–	7
Illinois	2	–	6	3	–	9
Michigan	1	–	7	5	–	7
Indiana	1	–	7	4	–	8
$ – BCS representative as conference champion; % – BCS at-large representative; Rankings from AP Poll

The 2009 Purdue Boilermakers football team represented Purdue University in the 2009 NCAA Division I FBS football season. They played their home games at Ross–Ade Stadium in West Lafayette, Indiana. It was Danny Hope's first season as head coach following the retirement of Joe Tiller. The Boilermakers finished the season 5–7 (4–4 Big Ten).

== Key roster returns ==
=== Offense ===
- Jared Zwilling – Center
- Ken Plue – Right Guard
- Aaron Valentin – Wide receiver
- Keith Smith – Wide receiver
- Kyle Adams – Tight end

=== Defense ===
- Torri Williams – Free Safety
- Brandon King – Cornerback
- David Pender – Cornerback
- Dwight McLean – Safety
- Ryan Kerrigan – Defensive end
- Chris Carlino – Mid Linebacker
- Joe Holland – Outside linebacker
- Mike Neal – Defensive end

== Key roster losses ==
=== Offense ===
- Curtis Painter – Quarterback
- Cory Benton – Center
- Kory Sheets – Running back
- Jordan Grimes – Offensive tackle
- Greg Orton – Wide receiver

=== Defense ===
- Alex Magee – Defensive end
- Eugene Bright – Defensive tackle
- Anthony Heygood – Middle Linebacker
- Ryan Baker – Defensive end

== Schedule ==
Date	Time	Opponent	Site	TV	Result	Attendance
September 5	12:00 pm	Toledo*	Ross–Ade Stadium; West Lafayette, IN	BTN	W 52–31	47,551
September 12	10:15 pm	at Oregon*	Autzen Stadium; Eugene, OR	FSN	L 36–38	57,772
September 19	12:00 pm	Northern Illinois*	Ross–Ade Stadium; West Lafayette, IN	BTN	L 21–28	53,240
September 26	8:00 pm	Notre Dame*	Ross–Ade Stadium; West Lafayette, IN (Battle for the Shillelagh Trophy)	ESPN	L 21–24	59,082
October 3	12:00 pm	Northwestern^{†}	Ross–Ade Stadium; West Lafayette, IN	BTN	L 21–27	47,163
October 10	12:00 pm	at Minnesota	TCF Bank Stadium; Minneapolis, MN	ESPN2	L 20–35	50,805
October 17	12:00 pm	No. 7 Ohio State	Ross–Ade Stadium; West Lafayette, IN	BTN	W 26–18	50,404
October 24	12:00 pm	Illinois	Ross–Ade Stadium; West Lafayette, IN (Battle for the Purdue Cannon)	ESPN2	W 24–14	47,349
October 31	12:00 pm	at Wisconsin	Camp Randall Stadium; Madison, WI	ESPN2	L 0–37	79,920
November 7	12:00 pm	at Michigan	Michigan Stadium; Ann Arbor, MI	BTN	W 38–36	108,543
November 14	12:00 pm	Michigan State	Ross–Ade Stadium; West Lafayette, IN	ESPN	L 37–40	48,408
November 21	3:30 pm	at Indiana	Memorial Stadium; Bloomington, IN (Old Oaken Bucket Game)	BTN	W 38–21	48,607
*Non-conference game; ^{†}Homecoming; Rankings from AP Poll released prior to the game; All times are in Eastern time

== Game summaries ==
=== Toledo ===
Team	1	2	3	4	Total
Toledo	0	14	7	10	31
• Purdue	14	17	14	7	52

- Date: September 5
- Location: Ross–Ade Stadium, West Lafayette, IN
- Game start: 12:00 p.m. EDT
- Elapsed time: 3:24
- Game attendance: 47,551
- Game weather: 72 °F (22 °C), Clear, Calm Wind
- Referee: John O'Neill
- TV announcers (BTN): Craig Coshun (Play-by-play), Rod Woodson (Color) & Larra Overton (Sideline)

Scoring summary
1	13:48	PUR	Ralph Bolden 78-yard run (Carson Wiggs kick)	PUR 7–0
1	4:14	PUR	Jaycen Taylor 43-yard run (Carson Wiggs kick)	PUR 14–0
2	13:53	PUR	Keith Smith 11-yard pass from Joey Elliott (Carson Wiggs kick)	PUR 21–0
2	11:17	TOL	Eric Page 34-yard pass from Aaron Opelt (Alex Steigerwald kick)	PUR 21–7
2	5:40	TOL	Stephen Williams 9-yard pass from Aaron Opelt (Alex Steigerwald kick)	PUR 21–14
2	1:25	PUR	Keith Carlos 24-yard pass from Joey Elliott (Carson Wiggs kick)	PUR 28–14
2	:00	PUR	Carson Wiggs 59-yard field goal	PUR 31–14
3	12:05	PUR	Jaycen Taylor 1-yard run (Carson Wiggs kick)	PUR 38–14
3	8:09	PUR	Antavian Edison 15-yard pass from Joey Elliott (Carson Wiggs kick)	PUR 45–14
3	4:41	TOL	DaJuane Collins 5-yard run (Alex Steigerwald kick)	PUR 45–21
4	11:37	TOL	Alex Steigerwald 48-yard field goal	PUR 45–24
4	6:36	TOL	Stephen Williams 42-yard pass from Aaron Opelt (Alex Steigerwald kick)	PUR 45–31
4	2:27	PUR	Ralph Bolden 14-yard run (Carson Wiggs kick)	PUR 51–31

Overall record	Previous meeting	Previous winner
2–2	September 1, 2007	Purdue, 52–24

To open the season, the Boilermakers played the Toledo Rockets at Ross–Ade Stadium. The Boilermakers scored first on their opening drive, with a 78-yard touchdown run by Ralph Bolden. They added to their lead 9 minutes later on a 43-yard touchdown run by Jaycen Taylor. In the second quarter, Purdue added to their lead with an 11-yard Keith Smith touchdown from Joey Elliott. Toledo then began their scoring with an Eric Page 34-yard touchdown pass from Aaron Opelt. Toledo struck again just 6 minutes later when Opelt found Stephen Williams for a 9-yard touchdown pass. Purdue responded with a 24-yard Keith Carlos touchdown pass from Elliott with 1:25 remaining in the half. Purdue was then able to get the ball back on downs from Toledo with 27 seconds remaining. After just 3 plays, Purdue called time out with 3 seconds remaining in the half. Carson Wiggs made a 59-yard field goal to end the half. The 59-yard field goal was the longest in Purdue history. Purdue would score twice to open the second half, a 1-yard run by Taylor and a 15-yard touchdown reception from Antavian Edison from Elliott. Toledo would get the next three scores, on a 5-yard touchdown run by DaJuane Collins, a 45-yard field goal by Alex Steigerwald and 42-yard Williams reception from Opelt. The 3 scores by Toledo got them with 4 points, but a 14-yard Bolden touchdown run sealed the scoring of the game.

Bolden's 234 yards rushing were the 3rd highest single game total in school history.

=== Oregon ===
Team	1	2	3	4	Total
Purdue	7	10	7	12	36
• Oregon	10	7	14	7	38

- Date: September 12
- Location: Autzen Stadium, Eugene, OR
- Game start: 10:15 p.m. EST
- Elapsed time: 3:22
- Game attendance: 57,772
- Referee: Jack Folliard
- TV announcers (FSN): Barry Tompkins (Play-by-play), Petros Papadakis (Color) & Michael Eaves (Sideline)

Scoring summary
1	10:19	ORE	Morgan Flint 28-yard field goal	ORE 3-0
1	8:17	PUR	Jaycen Taylor 5-yard run (Carson Wiggs kick)	PUR 7-3
1	6:10	ORE	Andre Crenshaw 2-yard run (Morgan Flint kick)	ORE 10-7
2	14:30	PUR	Ralph Bolden 19-yard run (Carson Wiggs kick)	PUR 14-10
2	4:04	ORE	Walter Thurmond III 18-yard interception return (Morgan Flint kick)	ORE 17-14
2	0:00	PUR	Carson Wiggs 23-yard field goal	Tied 17-17
3	8:24	PUR	Ralph Bolden 1-yard run (Carson Wiggs kick)	PUR 24-17
3	5:06	ORE	Bryan Littlejohn 28-yard fumble return (Morgan Flint kick)	Tied 24-24
3	1:51	ORE	Jeremiah Masoli 15-yard run (Morgan Flint kick)	ORE 31-24
4	13:46	PUR	Ralph Bolden 22-yard pass from Joey Elliot (kick blocked)	ORE 31-30
4	6:42	ORE	Kenjon Barner 21-yard run (Morgan Flint kick)	ORE 38-30
4	1:01	PUR	Aaron Valentin 15-yard pass from Keith Smith (pass failed)	ORE 38-36

=== Northern Illinois ===
Team	1	2	3	4	Total
• Northern Illinois	0	21	7	0	28
Purdue	7	0	7	7	21

- Date: September 19
- Location: Ross–Ade Stadium, West Lafayette, IN
- Game start: 12:00 p.m. EDT
- Elapsed time: 3:13
- Game attendance: 53,240
- Referee: Alex Kemp
- TV announcers (BTN): Craig Coshun (Play-by-play), Rod Woodson (Color) & Larra Overton (Sideline)

=== Notre Dame ===
Team	1	2	3	4	Total
• Notre Dame	3	14	0	7	24
Purdue	7	0	0	14	21

- Date: September 26
- Location: Ross–Ade Stadium, West Lafayette, IN
- Game start: 8:00 p.m. EDT
- Elapsed time: 3:21
- Game attendance: 59,082
- Referee: Pat Garvey
- TV announcers (ESPN): Brad Nessler (Play-by-play), Todd Blackledge (Color) & Erin Andrews (Sideline)

=== Northwestern ===
Team	1	2	3	4	Total
• Northwestern	3	13	3	8	27
Purdue	14	7	0	0	21

- Date: October 3
- Location: Ross–Ade Stadium, West Lafayette, IN
- Game start: 12:00 p.m. EDT
- Elapsed time: 3:11
- Game attendance: 47,163
- Referee: Todd Geerlings
- TV announcers (BTN): Ari Wolfe (Play-by-play), Anthony Herron (Color) & Tony McGee (Sideline)

=== Minnesota ===
Team	1	2	3	4	Total
Purdue	10	3	0	7	20
• Minnesota	0	14	21	0	35

- Date: October 10
- Location: TCF Bank Stadium, Minneapolis, MN
- Game start: 12:00 p.m. EDT
- Elapsed time: 3:05
- Game attendance: 50,805
- Referee: Ron Torbert
- TV announcers (ESPN2): Pam Ward (Play-by-play) & Ray Bentley (Color)

=== Ohio State ===
Team	1	2	3	4	Total
Ohio St	7	0	0	11	18
• Purdue	3	6	14	3	26

- Date: October 17
- Location: Ross–Ade Stadium, West Lafayette, IN
- Game start: 12:00 p.m. EDT
- Elapsed time: 3:18
- Game attendance: 50,404
- Referee: Bill LeMonnier
- TV announcers (BTN): Wayne Larrivee (Play-by-play), Chris Martin (Color) & Rebecca Haarlow (Sideline)

Purdue scored first with a field goal in the first quarter, but Ohio State made it 7–3 with a Pryor run for a touchdown. The second quarter was all Purdue with Boilermakers making two field goals to put them up it a 9-7 halftime. In the second half Purdue was finally able to find the end zone with two Joey Elliot touchdown passes to Valentin, making it a commanding 23–7 lead for the Boilermakers. In the fourth quarter both teams traded field goals with the score now 26–10. Purdue, however, was forced to punt midway through the fourth quarter and Ohio State quickly drove down the field to score a touchdown with a pass from Pryor to Posey, with Pryor running it in the two-point conversion. The next drive, Purdue went three and out and it seemed the momentum had shifted and Ohio State had come alive, but with a sack of Pryor and a denial of a fourth down, Purdue had the ball. After seemingly stopping Purdue, a crucial facemask penalty by the Buckeyes allowed the Boilermakers to run out the clock. This was the first time Ohio State had lost to a team that had finished the season with a losing record since a loss at Penn State in 2001.

=== Illinois ===
Team	1	2	3	4	Total
Illinois	7	0	7	0	14
• Purdue	7	14	3	0	24

- Date: October 24
- Location: Ross–Ade Stadium, West Lafayette, IN
- Game start: 12:00 p.m. EDT
- Elapsed time: 2:%5
- Game attendance: 47,349
- Referee: Ron Torbert
- TV announcers (ESPN2): Pam Ward (Play-by-play) & Ray Bentley (Color)

=== Wisconsin ===
Team	1	2	3	4	Total
Purdue	0	0	0	0	0
• Wisconsin	7	17	10	3	37

- Date: October 31
- Location: Camp Randall Stadium, Madison, WI
- Game start: 12:00 p.m. EDT
- Elapsed time: 3:00
- Game attendance: 79,920
- Referee: Dennis Lipski
- TV announcers (ESPN2): Pam Ward (Play-by-play) & Ray Bentley (Color)

=== Michigan ===
Team	1	2	3	4	Total
• Purdue	10	0	21	7	38
Michigan	10	14	6	6	36

- Date: November 7
- Location: Michigan Stadium, Ann Arbor, MI
- Game start: 12:00 p.m. EDT
- Elapsed time: 3:15
- Game attendance: 108,543
- Referee: Todd Geerlings
- TV announcers (BTN): Wayne Larrivee (Play-by-play), Chris Martin (Color) & Charissa Thompson (Sideline)
- Source: ESPN.com

Scoring summary
1	13:15	PUR	Ralph Bolden 35-yard pass from Joey Elliott (Carson Wiggs kick)	PUR 7-0
1	10:53	MICH	Brandon Minor 29-yard run (Jason Olesnavage kick)	Tied 7-7
1	7:42	PUR	Carson Wiggs 41-yard field goal	PUR 10-7
1	6:02	MICH	Jason Olesnavage 51-yard field goal	Tied 10-10
2	14:52	MICH	Brandon Minor 55-yard run (Jason Olesnavage kick)	MICH 17-10
2	8:41	MICH	Roy Roundtree 43-yard pass from Tate Forcier (Jason Olesnavage kick)	MICH 24-10
3	13:38	PUR	Ralph Bolden 19-yard run (Carson Wiggs kick)	MICH 24-17
3	11:42	MICH	Tate Forcier 6-yard run (kick failed)	MICH 30-17
3	5:13	PUR	Ralph Bolden 10-yard run (Carson Wiggs kick)	MICH 30-24
3	5:04	PUR	Cortez Smith 54-yard pass from Joey Elliott (Carson Wiggs kick)	PUR 31-30
4	10:28	PUR	Joey Elliott 8-yard run (Carson Wiggs kick)	PUR 38-30
4	2:10	MICH	Brandon Minor 1-yard run (run failed)	PUR 38-36

In the first quarter, Purdue scored first with a 35-yard TD catch by Ralph Bolden. Michigan tied the score with a 29-yard TD run by Brandon Minor. Purdue retook the lead with a 41-yard field goal by Carson Wiggs. Michigan tied the score soon after with a 51-yard field goal. In the second quarter, Michigan scored 2 touchdowns: a 55-yard rush by Brandon Minor, and a 43-yard catch by Ray Roundtree, giving the Wolverines a 14-point advantage at halftime.

However, Michigan would collapsed in the second half. In the third quarter, Purdue's Ralph Bolden scored his second TD of the game with a 19-yard run. Michigan QB Forcier responded with a 6-yard TD run, but the point after touchdown attempt failed. Ralph Bolden scored his third touchdown of the day soon after with a 10-yard rush. In the ensuing kickoff, Purdue made an on-side kick and recovered the ball by catching the Wolverines off guard. In the next play, Purdue's Cortez Smith caught a 54-yard TD pass and Purdue re-took the lead 31–30 after the extra point attempt was completed. In the fourth quarter, Purdue QB Joey Elliot ran in an 8-yard TD. Michigan's Minor then ran in a TD from 1-yard out. The Wolverines attempted to tie the game but Forcier failed to reach the end zone on a two-point conversion after being sacked by Ryan Kerrigan, sealing the victory for the Boilermakers. It was Purdue's first win in Michigan Stadium since 1966.

=== Michigan State ===
Team	1	2	3	4	Total
• Michigan State	7	10	6	17	40
Purdue	10	10	7	10	37

- Date: November 14
- Location: Ross–Ade Stadium, West Lafayette, IN
- Game start: 12:00 p.m. EST
- Elapsed time: 3:24
- Game attendance: 48,408
- Referee: Dave Witvoet
- TV announcers (ESPN): Dave Pasch (Play-by-play), Bob Griese (Color) & Chris Spielman (Sideline)

=== Indiana ===
Team	1	2	3	4	Total
• Purdue	14	7	10	7	38
Indiana	0	7	7	7	21

- Date: November 21
- Location: Memorial Stadium, Bloomington, IN
- Game start: 3:30 p.m. EST
- Elapsed time: 3:14
- Game attendance: 48,607
- Referee: Ron Torbert
- TV announcers (BTN): Craig Coshun (Play-by-play), Anthony Herron (Color) & Mark Campbell (Sideline)

== Roster ==
2009 Purdue Boilermakers football team roster
Players
Coaches
Offense

Pos.	#	Name	Class
WR	1	Keith Carlos	Jr
WR	3	Waynelle Gravesande	So
WR	4	Eric Williams	Fr
RB	5	Al-Terek McBurse	Fr
WR	6	Gary Bush	Fr
QB	7	Najee Tyler	Fr
WR	8	Keith Smith	Jr
QB	9	Robert Marve (I)	So
WR	10	Royce Adams	Sr
QB	12	Tommie Thomas	Fr
QB	12	Chris Bennett	Sr
QB	14	Joey Elliott (C)	Sr
QB	15	Rob Henry	Fr
TE	16	Jeff Panfil	Jr
WR	17	Aaron Valentine	Sr
QB	18	Skyler Titus	Fr
QB	19	Caleb TerBush	Fr
RB	21	Javeare White	Jr
FB	22	Sean Matti	So
RB	23	Ralph Bolden	So
RB	24	George Brigandi	Fr
RB	25	Dan Dierking	Jr
WR	26	Adam Wolf	Sr
WR	27	T. J. Barbarette	Fr
FB	28	Jarrod Shaw	Sr
RB	33	Jaycen Taylor	Sr
WR	34	Antavian Edison	Fr
FB	44	Frank Halliburton	Sr
TE	46	Kurt Freytag	Fr
FB	48	Jared Crank	So
G	50	Eric Hedstrom	Sr
G	53	Dan Barry	So
C	54	Jared Zwilling	Sr
OT	56	Monroe Brooks	Fr
OT	61	Zach Jones	Sr
G	63	James Shepherd	So
C	64	Henry Lorenzen	Fr
C	65	Austen Moret	So
OT	67	Peters Drey	Fr
OT	68	Dennis Kelly	So
G	72	Justin Pierce	Jr
G	73	Ken Plue	So
G	74	Connor Snapp	Fr
G	75	Zach Reckman	Sr
C, G	76	Rick Schmeig	Fr
OT	77	Ryan Prater	Jr
OT	78	Trevor Foy	Fr
C	79	Andrew Brewer	Fr
WR	80	Xavier Reese	Fr
WR	81	Cortez Smith	Jr
TE	82	Crosby Wright	Fr
WR	83	Kurt Lichtenberg	So
TE	85	Kyle Adams	Jr
WR	87	Kris Staats	Jr
TE	88	Jeff Lindsay	Jr
TE	89	Colton McKey	So

Defense

Pos.	#	Name	Class
S	2	Torri Williams (C)	Sr
LB	3	Dwayne Beckford	Fr
S	4	Dwight McLean	Sr
LB	5	Antwon Higgs	Fr
CB	7	Brandon King	Sr
CB	9	David Pender	Sr
LB	11	DeVarro Greaves	So
CB	15	Charlton Williams	So
LB	18	Nnamadi Ezenwa	Fr
CB	19	Jimmy Riley	Fr
S	20	Gavin Roberts	Fr
S	22	Ishmael Aristide	Fr
LB	24	Jason Warner (C)	Sr
CB	28	Josh Johnson	Fr
CB	29	Chris Quinn	Fr
LB	30	Joe Holland	So
S	32	Albert Evans	So
CB	34	Sean Collins	Fr
S	35	Logan Link	So
LB	36	Zack Heiniger	Fr
CB	38	Josh VanZant	So
LB	39	John Humphrey	Jr
LB	40	Derek Jackson	Fr
DT	42	Kevin Pamphile	Fr
CB	43	Walter Williams	Jr
LB	47	Chris Carlino	So
DT	49	Adam Brockman	So
LB	51	Kakpindi Jamiru	Fr
DT	55	Brandon Taylor	Fr
LB	57	Tyler Haston	Jr
DE	58	Robert Maci	Fr
DT	59	Cody Davis	Fr
DT	60	Brad Niemeier	Fr
DT	70	LaSalle Cooks	Fr
DE	84	Eric Mebane	Fr
DT	86	Chris Mitchum	Fr
DT	90	Xavier Melton	Fr
DE	91	Justin Kitchens	Fr
DT	92	Mike Neal	Sr
DT	93	Kawann Short	Fr
DE	94	Ryan Kerrigan	Jr
DE	95	Keyon Brown	Sr
DE	97	Gerald Gooden	So
DT	98	Eric McDaniel	Fr
DT	99	Nick Mondek	So

Special teams

Pos.	#	Name	Class
P	13	Chris Summers	Sr
K	36	Robert Harris	Fr
K, P	37	Carson Wiggs	So
P, K	38	Kaleb Volstad	So
LS	46	Kevin Ballinger	So
LS	62	Andy Hoffman	Sr
P	90	Matt Foster	So
LS	96	John Finch	Jr

Head coach

- Danny Hope

Coordinators/assistant coaches

- Gary Nord (offensive coordinator / quarterbacks)
- Donn Landholm (defensive coordinator)
- J. B. Gibboney (Special Teams Coordinator)
- Lou Anarumo (defensive backs)
- Shawn Clark (offensive line)
- Mark Hagen (linebackers)
- Cornell Jackson (running backs)
- Brian Rock (wide receivers)
- Terrell Williams (defensive line)
- Nick Cavallo (graduate assistant defense)
- Casey Nuss (graduate assistant operations)
- Joe Deifel (graduate assistant offense)
- Kyle Smith (graduate assistant quality control)
- Don Coller (Recruiting Coordinator / Director of football operations
- Jim Lathrop (Director of Strength & Conditioning)
- Mike Chacksfield (Student Assistant)

Legend

- (C) Team captain
- (S) Suspended
- (I) Ineligible
- Injured
- Redshirt

Roster
Last update: January 1, 2017

== After the season ==
=== 2010 NFL draft ===
Player	Position	Round	Pick	NFL club	Ref
Mike Neal	Defensive tackle	2	56	Green Bay Packers	
