= 2011 Purdue Boilermakers football team =

American college football season

2011 Purdue Boilermakers football

Little Caesars Pizza Bowl champion

Little Caesars Pizza Bowl, W 37–32 vs. Western Michigan
- Conference: Big Ten Conference
- Leaders Division
- Record: 7–6 (4–4 Big Ten)
- Head coach: Danny Hope (3rd season)
- Offensive coordinator: Gary Nord (3rd season)
- Offensive scheme: Spread
- Defensive coordinator: Gary Emanuel (2nd season)
- Base defense: 4–3
- Captains: Chris Carlino; Rob Henry; Dennis Kelly; Kawann Short
- Home stadium: Ross–Ade Stadium

2011 Big Ten Conference football standings
	Conf.			Overall
Team	W		L	W		L
Legends Division
No. 11 Michigan State x	7	–	1	11	–	3
No. 12 Michigan %	6	–	2	11	–	2
No. 24 Nebraska	5	–	3	9	–	4
Iowa	4	–	4	7	–	6
Northwestern	3	–	5	6	–	7
Minnesota	2	–	6	3	–	9
Leaders Division
No. 10 Wisconsin xy$	6	–	2	11	–	3
Penn State x	6	–	2	9	–	4
Purdue	4	–	4	7	–	6
Ohio State	3	–	5	6	–	7
Illinois	2	–	6	7	–	6
Indiana	0	–	8	1	–	11
Championship: Wisconsin 42, Michigan State 39
$ – BCS representative as conference champion; % – BCS at-large representative; x – Division champion/co-champions; y – Championship game participant; Rankings from AP Poll

The 2011 Purdue Boilermakers football team represented Purdue University in the 2011 NCAA Division I FBS football season. Under third-year head coach Danny Hope, Purdue compiled a record of 7–6 and finished in third place in the newly formed Leaders Division of the Big Ten Conference. They played their home games at Ross–Ade Stadium in West Lafayette, Indiana and are members of the Big Ten Conference. Highlights of Purdue's 2011 season included a 21–14 victory over #21 Illinois, a 26–23 overtime victory over Ohio State, and the first bowl game since 2007. Purdue's season ended with a 37–32 victory against Western Michigan in the 2011 Little Caesars Pizza Bowl.

The Special teams unit for the 2011 season was a key factor in many of the Boilermakers games as they averaged a school-record 28.7 yards per kick-off return. The team title was the first since the 1954 Boilermakers led the NCAA in any yardage category for an entire season, and is merely the third team title in school history (also passing defense in 1941). True freshman Raheem Mostert was a key contributor, as he averaged 33.5 yards a return, capped off with a 99-yard touchdown return in the bowl game. He finished the season with seven returns of 39 or more yards, including an 81-yarder at Indiana and a 74-yarder at Wisconsin. Against the Badgers, he racked up 206 yards on five kickoff returns to break 42-year-old school records for total yardage and average yards per return.

== Before the season ==
The Boilermakers are looking to improve on a 4–8 record (2–6 in conference play) in 2010, in which they finished 9th in the Big Ten conference. The offense will be aided by the return of junior running back, Ralph Bolden, who is returning from a torn ACL but led the team in rushing yards back in 2009. Their running back depth will be tested, as the running back with the most yards who was still had eligibility remaining, Al-Terek McBurse transferred out of Purdue. Rob Henry was named the starting quarterback in the preseason, but tore his ACL on August 23, and will miss the entire 2011 season. The quarterback play will be split between Robert Marve and Caleb TerBush. The receiving core returns its 2010 leader in touchdowns, Antavian Edison, as well as O. J. Ross who saw significant playing time during the 2010 season as a true freshman. On the defense the departure of Ryan Kerrigan, who was selected in the first round of the 2011 NFL draft, will be a tough hole to fill, but will be aided by the return of Kawann Short, the team's top returning sack man. The linebacking group returns all three starters from a season ago, which includes 2 of the team's top 3 tacklers in 2010, Dwayne Beckford and Joe Holland. The secondary also returns all its starters, led by 2010 leading tackler, Logan Link and Ricardo Allen. The Boilermakers are looking to return to a bowl game for the first time since 2007.

=== Recruiting ===
College recruiting
Name	Hometown	School	Height	Weight	40^{‡}	Commit date
Sterling Carter; TE	Wilmington, California	Los Angeles Harbor College	6 ft 5 in (1.96 m)	240 lb (110 kg)	4.7	Dec 14, 2010
Sterling Carter; TE	Recruit ratings: Scout: Rivals: (NR)					
Brandon Cottom; ATH	Newtown, Bucks County, Pennsylvania	Council Rock H.S. North	6 ft 2 in (1.88 m)	229 lb (104 kg)	4.8	Jun 14, 2010
Brandon Cottom; ATH	Recruit ratings: Scout: Rivals: (76)					
Doug Gentry; RB	Mexia, Texas	Mexia H.S.	6 ft 4 in (1.93 m)	194 lb (88 kg)	–	Nov 25, 2010
Doug Gentry; RB	Recruit ratings: Scout: Rivals: (76)					
Akeem Hunt; RB	Covington, Georgia	Newton H.S.	5 ft 10.5 in (1.79 m)	173.5 lb (78.7 kg)	4.53	Nov 12, 2011
Akeem Hunt; RB	Recruit ratings: Scout: Rivals: (75)					
Kaulana Judd; LB	Fullerton, California	Fullerton College	6 ft 2.5 in (1.89 m)	230 lb (100 kg)	–	Feb 2, 2011
Kaulana Judd; LB	Recruit ratings: Scout: Rivals: (–)					
Robert Kugler; TE	Pittsburgh, Pennsylvania	North Allegheny Senior H.S.	6 ft 3 in (1.91 m)	237.5 lb (107.7 kg)	4.825	May 18, 2010
Robert Kugler; TE	Recruit ratings: Scout: Rivals: (78)					
Shane Mikesky; WR	Zionsville, Indiana	Zionsville Community H.S.	6 ft 4 in (1.93 m)	190 lb (86 kg)	–	Nov 18, 2010
Shane Mikesky; WR	Recruit ratings: Scout: Rivals: (73)					
Raheem Mostert; S/WR	New Smyrna Beach, Florida	New Smyrna Beach H.S.	5 ft 10.5 in (1.79 m)	180 lb (82 kg)	–	Jan 25, 2011
Raheem Mostert; S/WR	Recruit ratings: Scout: Rivals: (79)					
Jalani Phillips; LB	Warner Robins, Georgia	Houston County H.S.	6 ft 4 in (1.93 m)	255 lb (116 kg)	–	Feb 2, 2011
Jalani Phillips; LB	Recruit ratings: Scout: Rivals: (45)					
Taylor Richards; DB	Lake Mary, Florida	Lake Mary H.S.	5 ft 11.5 in (1.82 m)	170 lb (77 kg)	–	Jul 18, 2010
Taylor Richards; DB	Recruit ratings: Scout: Rivals: (77)					
Michael Rouse III; DT	Flossmoor, Illinois	Homewood-Flossmoor H.S.	6 ft 4 in (1.93 m)	307.5 lb (139.5 kg)	–	Jun 17, 2010
Michael Rouse III; DT	Recruit ratings: Scout: Rivals: (73)					
Akeem Shavers; RB	Tyler, Texas	Tyler J.C.	5 ft 11 in (1.80 m)	200 lb (91 kg)	4.5	Dec 6, 2010
Akeem Shavers; RB	Recruit ratings: Scout: Rivals: (NR)					
Armstead Williams; LB	Monroeville, Pennsylvania	Gateway H.S.	6 ft 3 in (1.91 m)	207.5 lb (94.1 kg)	4.65	Jan 11, 2011
Armstead Williams; LB	Recruit ratings: Scout: Rivals: (79)					
Frankie Williams; ATH/WR	Tampa, Florida	Thomas Richard Robinson H.S.	5 ft 10 in (1.78 m)	175 lb (79 kg)	4.5	Jan 22, 2011
Frankie Williams; ATH/WR	Recruit ratings: Scout: Rivals: (78)					
Overall recruit ranking: Scout: 77
Note: In many cases, Scout, Rivals, 247Sports, On3, and ESPN may conflict in their listings of height and weight.; In these cases, the average was taken. ESPN grades are on a 100-point scale.; Sources: "Purdue Football Commitments". Rivals.; "2011 Purdue Football Commits". Scout.; "ESPN". ESPN.; "Scout.com Team Recruiting Rankings". Scout.; "2011 Team Ranking". Rivals.com.

== Schedule ==
Date	Time	Opponent	Site	TV	Result	Attendance
September 3	12:00 pm	Middle Tennessee*	Ross–Ade Stadium; West Lafayette, IN	BTN	W 27–24	42,110
September 10	3:30 pm	at Rice*	Rice Stadium; Houston, TX	CBSSN	L 22–24	25,317
September 17	12:00 pm	Southeast Missouri State*	Ross–Ade Stadium; West Lafayette, IN	BTN	W 59–0	46,116
October 1	8:00 pm	Notre Dame*	Ross–Ade Stadium; West Lafayette, IN (Battle for the Shillelagh Trophy)	ESPN	L 10–38	61,555
October 8	12:00 pm	Minnesota	Ross–Ade Stadium; West Lafayette, IN	ESPN	W 45–17	38,207
October 15	12:00 pm	at Penn State	Beaver Stadium; State College, PA	BTN	L 18–23	100,820
October 22	12:00 pm	No. 23 Illinois^{†}	Ross–Ade Stadium; West Lafayette, IN (Battle for the Purdue Cannon)	ESPN2	W 21–14	45,146
October 29	12:00 pm	at No. 17 Michigan	Michigan Stadium; Ann Arbor, MI	ESPN2	L 14–36	112,115
November 5	3:30 pm	at No. 19 Wisconsin	Camp Randall Stadium; Madison, WI	ABC/ESPN2	L 17–62	80,566
November 12	12:00 pm	Ohio State	Ross–Ade Stadium; West Lafayette, IN	BTN	W 26–23 ^{OT}	43,334
November 19	12:00 pm	Iowa	Ross–Ade Stadium; West Lafayette, IN	BTN	L 21–31	44,017
November 26	3:30 pm	at Indiana	Memorial Stadium; Bloomington, IN (Old Oaken Bucket Game)	BTN	W 33–25	42,005
December 27	4:30 pm	vs. Western Michigan*	Ford Field; Detroit, MI (Little Caesars Pizza Bowl)	ESPN	W 37–32	46,177
*Non-conference game; ^{†}Homecoming; Rankings from AP Poll released prior to the game; All times are in Eastern time

== Roster ==
2011 Purdue Boilermakers football team roster
Players
Coaches
Offense

Pos.	#	Name	Class
WR	2	Justin Siller	Sr
WR	3	Waynelle Gravesande	Sr
WR	4	O. J. Ross	So
WR	6	Gary Bush	So
WR	8	Raheem Mostert	Fr
QB	9	Robert Marve	Sr
QB	10	Sean Robinson	So
RB	11	Akeem Hunt	Fr
WR	12	Tommie Thomas	Jr
WR	13	Antavian Edison	Jr
QB	14	Spencer Dawson	Sr
QB	15	Rob Henry (C)	So
WR	16	Dolapo McCarthy	Fr
QB	17	Austin Parker	Fr
WR	17	Charles Torwudzo	Fr
QB	19	Caleb TerBush	Jr
RB	20	Gavin Roberts	Jr
RB	22	Sean Matti	Sr
RB	23	Ralph Bolden	Jr
RB	24	Akeem Shavers	Jr
RB	25	Brandon Cottom	Fr
WR	27	T. J. Barbarette	Jr
RB	29	Doug Gentry	Fr
RB	33	Reggie Pegram	So
RB	39	Devin Hill	Fr
FB	40	Derek Jackson	Jr
FB	46	Kurt Freytag	So
FB	48	Jared Crank	Sr
OT	51	Justin Kitchens	So
C	52	Henry Lorenzen	So
G	53	Dan Barry	Sr
OT	54	Jack DeBoef	Fr
G	56	Eric McDaniel	So
C	59	Cody Davis	So
OT	60	Chuck Ayres	Fr
OT	62	Nick Mondek	Sr
G	63	James Shepherd	Sr
C	65	Austen Moret	Sr
C	67	Peters Drey	Jr
OT	68	Dennis Kelly (C)	Sr
G	73	Ken Plue (I)	Sr
G	74	Connor Snapp	So
OT	75	Josh Davis	Fr
G	76	Rick Schmeig	Jr
OT	77	Matt Huene	Fr
OT	78	Trevor Foy	So
WR	80	Zack Sigman	Jr
TE	81	Sterling Carter	Jr
TE	82	Crosby Wright	Jr
WR	83	Kurt Lichtenberg	Sr
TE	84	Justin Sinz	So
OT	85	Robert Kugler	Fr
TE	86	Gabe Holmes	So
WR	87	Shane Mikesky	Fr
TE	88	Patrick Bade	So

Defense

Pos.	#	Name	Class
CB	1	Normando Harris	So
DE	2	Gerald Gooden	Sr
LB	3	Dwayne Beckford	Jr
DB	4	Taylor Richards	Fr
LB	5	Antwon Higgs	Jr
CB	6	Frankie Williams	Fr
S	7	E. J. Johnson	Fr
LB	11	DeVarro Graves	Sr
CB	15	Charlton Williams	Sr
LB	18	Nnamadi Ezenwa	Jr
CB	21	Ricardo Allen	Jr
S	22	Ishmael Aristide	So
CB	26	Antoine Lewis	Fr
CB	28	Josh Johnson	Jr
S	29	Chris Quinn	Jr
LB	30	Joe Holland	Sr
LB	31	Armstead Williams	Fr
S	32	Albert Evans	Sr
S	34	Max Charlot	Jr
S	35	Logan Link	Sr
LB	36	Zack Heiniger	Jr
LB	38	Mike Lee	Fr
LB	39	Joe Gilliam	Fr
LB	40	Collin Link	Fr
CB	41	Sean Collins	So
S	44	Landon Feichter	Fr
LB	45	Will Lucas	So
LB	47	Chris Carlino (C)	Sr
DE	49	Adam Brockman	Sr
DT	55	Brandon Taylor	So
LB	57	Kaulana Judd	Jr
LB	58	Robert Maci	Jr
DT	60	Brad Niemeier	Sr
DT	61	Ryan Isaac	So
DT	70	LaSalle Cooks	Jr
DE	80	Kingsley Ike	Fr
DE	84	Eric Mebane	Jr
LB	89	Jalani Phillips	Fr
DT	90	Bruce Gaston	So
DT	93	Kawann Short	Jr
DT	95	Kevin Pamphile	So
LB	96	Alan Chase	Fr
DT	97	Michael Rouse III	Fr
DE	99	Ryan Russell	Fr

Special teams

Pos.	#	Name	Class
LS	31	Kevin Ballinger	Sr
K	36	Robert Harris	So
K	37	Carson Wiggs	Sr
P	42	Cody Webster	So
K	43	Sam McCartney	Fr
LS	50	Jesse Schmitt	Fr

Head coach

- Danny Hope

Coordinators/assistant coaches

- Gary Nord (offensive coordinator / assistant head coach / quarterbacks)
- Gary Emanuel (defensive coordinator / defensive linemen)
- J.B. Gibboney (special teams coordinator)
- Cornell Jackson (running backs)
- Patrick Higgins (wide receivers)
- Shawn Clark (offensive line)
- Phil Elmassian (Inside linebackers)
- Lou Anarumo (defensive backs)
- Don Landholm (outside linebackers)
- Kyle Smith (graduate assistant)
- Jules Montinar (graduate assistant)

Legend

- (C) Team captain
- (S) Suspended
- (I) Ineligible
- Injured
- Redshirt

Roster
Last update: December 10, 2013

== Depth chart ==
Defense

FS
Albert Evans
Max Charlot

WLB	MLB	SLB
Joe Holland	Dwayne Beckford	Will Lucas
Nnamdi Nzenwa	Chris Carlino	Joe Gilliam

SS
Logan Link
Landon Feichter

CB
Ricardo Allen
Charlton Williams

DE	DT	DT	DE
Gerald Gooden	Kawann Short	Bruce Gaston	Ryan Russell
Adam Brockman	Brandon Taylor	Ryan Issac	Robert Maci

CB
Josh Johnson
Normando Harris

Offense

WR
Antavian Edison
Kurt Lichtenburg

WR
O. J. Ross
Gary Bush

LT	LG	C	RG	RT
Dennis Kelly	Peters Drey	Rick Schmeig	Nick Mondek	Trevor Foy
Jack De Boef	Eric McDaniel	Peters Drey	James Shephard	Justin Kitchens

TE
Gabe Holmes
Crosby Wright

WR
Justin Siller
Waynelle Gravesande

QB
Caleb TerBush
Robert Marve

Key reserves
FB Jared Crank

Special teams
PK Carson Wiggs
PK Robert Harris
P Cody Webster
P Carson Wiggs
KR Raheem Mostert
PR Waynelle Gravesande
LS Jesse Schmitt
H Cody Webster

RB
Ralph Bolden
Akeem Shavers

== Coaching staff ==
Name	Position	Year at Purdue	Alma mater
Danny Hope	Head coach	3rd	Eastern Kentucky
Gary Nord	Assistant head coach/offensive coordinator/quarterbacks coach	3rd	Louisville
Gary Emanuel	Defensive coordinator/defensive line coach	2nd	Plymouth State
J.B. Gibboney	Special teams coordinator	3rd	Pittsburgh
Cornell Jackson	Running backs coach	3rd	Sterling College
Lou Anarumo	Defensive backs coach	8th	Wagner
Shawn Clark	Offensive line coach	3rd	Appalachian State
Donn Landholm	Outside linebackers coach	3rd	Wayne State
Phil Elmassian	Inside linebackers coach	2nd (2nd stint)	William & Mary
Patrick Higgins	Wide receivers coach	1st	William Penn

== Game summaries ==
=== Middle Tennessee State ===
Middle Tennessee State at Purdue

Team	1	2	3	4	Total
Blue Raiders	7	7	0	10	24
• Boilermakers	3	7	0	17	27

- Date: September 3
- Location: Ross–Ade Stadium
  West Lafayette, Indiana
- Game start: 12:00 p.m. EST
- Elapsed time: 3:38
- Game attendance: 42,110
- Game weather: 90 °F (32 °C), Clear, SW 5 mph (8.0 km/h)
- Referee: Scott McElwee
- TV announcers (BTN): Wayne Larrivee, Joe Tiller & Jon Jansen

In the opening game of the season, Purdue hosted the Middle Tennessee State Blue Raiders. It was the first time that the two universities have played each other in football.

There was a great bit of uncertainty going into the game as Purdue was going into their first game without starting quarterback, and captain, Rob Henry, and backup quarterback Robert Marve was still not healthy from an ACL injury. This led to redshirt junior, Caleb TerBush making the first start of his career. TerBush had not played since 2009 when he was the backup to Joey Elliott, and he missed the 2010 season with academic problems.

The Blue Raiders got off to an early lead when Logan Kilgore found Malcolm Beyah for a 26-yard touchdown pass. Carson Wiggs added a field goal as Purdue's response score to make it 7–3 at the end of the 1st quarter.

Purdue grabbed its first lead of the game when Caleb TerBush's rollout pass found Jared Crank for a 2-yard score. The touchdown pass was the first of TerBush's career. The Blue Raiders responded two possessions later, as Logan Kilgore's wide receiver screen pass to Sancho McDonald was taken 21-yards for a score after McDonald was able to dodge a defender. The first half ended with the Boilermakers trailing 14–10.

After no one scored in the 3rd quarter, Middle Tennessee St., opened up the 2nd half scoring with a 42-yard field goal by Alan Gendreau. Purdue responded with a 30-yard touchdown run by Akeem Shavers to tie the game at 17. The Blue Raiders responded quickly as they capped a 60-yard drive, with a 2-yard draw run by Benny Cunningham to reclaim the lead. Purdue was able to get another field goal as Carson Wiggs connected on a 47-yarder to make it 24–20 with 5:57 remaining in the game. The Boilermaker defense was able to force a punt, which allowed Purdue to get the ball back with 3:53 left in the game. TerBush led the Boilers down the field and eventually found Antavian Edison with a 35-yard crossing route to give Purdue the lead, 27–24 with 49 seconds remaining. The Blue Raiders drove the ball down to the Purdue 30-yard line, and took a shot with a deep pass. Kilgore's pass hit off the fingertips of Beyah and fell harmlessly out of bounds with 5 seconds remaining. The Blue Raiders then decided to go for the tie, but Gendreau's 47-yard attempt was blocked by Ricardo Allen as time expired.

Middle Tennessee State Blue Raiders at Purdue Boilermakers – Game summary

Quarter	1	2	3	4	Total
Blue Raiders	7	7	0	10	24
Boilermakers	3	7	0	17	27

at Ross–Ade Stadium, West Lafayette, Indiana

- Date: September 3
- Game time: 12:00 p.m. EDT
- Game attendance: 42,110
- Referee: Scott McElwee

Game information

1st quarter

- Middle Tennessee State – (8:19) Malcolm Beyah 26-yard pass from Logan Kilgore (Alan Gendreau kick), Middle Tennessee State 7–0
- Purdue – (5:52) Carson Wiggs 50-yard field goal, Middle Tennessee State 7–3

2nd quarter

- Purdue – (7:32) Jared Crank 2-yard pass from Caleb TerBush (Carson Wiggs kick), Purdue 10–7
- Middle Tennessee State – (2:10) Sancho McDonald 21-yard pass from Logan Kilgore (Alan Gendreau kick), Middle Tennessee State 14–10

3rd quarter

4th quarter

- Middle Tennessee State – (13:58) Alan Gendreau 42-yard field goal, Middle Tennessee State 17–10
- Purdue – (11:44) Akeem Shavers 30-yard run (Carson Wiggs), 17–17
- Middle Tennessee State – (9:26) Benjamin Cunningham 2-yard run (Carson Wiggs), Middle Tennessee State 24–17
- Purdue – (5:57) Carson Wiggs 47-yard field goal, Middle Tennessee State 24–20
- Purdue – (0:49) Antavian Edison 35-yard pass from Caleb TerBush (Carson Wiggs kick), Purdue 27–24

Passing

- Middle Tennessee State – Logan Kilgore: 27/45, 330 yards, 2 TD
- Purdue – Caleb TerBush: 18/31, 183 yards, 1 TD

Rushing

- Middle Tennessee State – Benjamin Cunningham: 14 att, 65 yards, 1 TD
- Purdue – Ralph Bolden: 17 att, 120 yards, 0 TD

Receiving

- Middle Tennessee State – Tavarres Jefferson: 7 rec, 61 yards, 0 TD
- Purdue – Justin Siller: 5 rec, 56 yards, 0 TD

=== Rice ===
Purdue at Rice

Team	1	2	3	4	Total
Boilermakers	7	10	2	3	22
• Owls	3	14	7	0	24

- Date: September 10
- Location: Rice Stadium
  Houston, Texas
- Game start: 2:38 p.m. EST
- Elapsed time: 3:25
- Game attendance: 25,317
- Game weather: 94 °F (34 °C), Clear, N 10 mph (16 km/h)
- Referee: Steve Barth
- TV announcers (CBSSN): Dave Ryan, Rich Rodriguez & Kaylee Hartung

The Owls started the scoring in the first quarter with a 33-yard field goal by Chris Boswell. Purdue responded with an 80-yard drive, capped off with a 5-yard Caleb TerBush run, to give Purdue the lead. Rice responded with a 2-yard touchdown run by Turner Petersen to start the second quarter scoring. Carson Wiggs added a 28-yard field goal to make the score even at 10. After a quick 3 and out by Rice, Purdue scored on a 19-yard reception by Crosby Wright to regain the lead. Rice then scored on a 4-yard touchdown pass by Taylor McHargue to Luke Willson as time expired to tie the game at 17.

Rice received the ball to start the 2nd half, and scored on a 19-yard run by Sam McGuffie to finished off an 11-play, 80-yard drive, and gave the Owls' their first lead since the 1st quarter. Later in the quarter, Purdue had driven down to the Rice 1-yard line, but could not get the ball in the endzone and turn it over on downs. The first play after Rice took over, Purdue tackled Charles Ross in the endzone for a safety to make the score 24–19 in favor of Rice. Wiggs added a 27-yard field goal with 7:56 remaining in the game. Purdue's defense remained strong on the next 2 drives, forcing Rice to punt each time. The Boilermakers got the ball on their own 48 with 1:52 remaining, and three long runs by Ralph Bolden moved them inside the 20. With 31 seconds remaining, Purdue ran Akeem Shavers to center the ball in the middle of the field. This set up a 4 & 10 on the Rice 14-yard line. Without a timeout remaining, Purdue was able to run out the special teams unit and get set without any of the players being rushed. Rice's Justin Allen then blocked Wiggs' 31-yard field-goal attempt as time expired, to clinch a 24–22 victory over Purdue.

Purdue Boilermakers at Rice Owls – Game summary

Quarter	1	2	3	4	Total
Boilermakers	7	10	2	3	22
Owls	3	14	7	0	24

at Rice Stadium, Houston, Texas

- Date: September 10
- Game time: 2:35 p.m. CDT
- Game attendance: 25,317
- Referee: Steve Barth

Game information

1st quarter

- Rice – (5:46) Chris Boswell 33-yard field goal, Rice 3–0
- Purdue – (2:07) Caleb TerBush 5-yard run (Carson Wiggs kick), Purdue 7–3

2nd quarter

- Rice – (13:43) Turner Peterson 2-yard run (Chris Boswell kick), Rice 10–7
- Purdue – (8:48) Carson Wiggs 28-yard field goal, 10–10
- Purdue – (7:32) Crosby Wright 2-yard pass from Caleb TerBush (Carson Wiggs kick), Purdue 17–10
- Rice – (0:00) Luke Willson 4-yard pass from Taylor McHargue (Chris Boswell kick), 17–17

3rd quarter

- Rice – (10:24) Sam McGuffie 19-yard pass from Taylor McHargue (Chris Boswell kick), Rice 24–17
- Purdue – (1:06) Team Safety Rice 24–19

4th quarter

- Purdue – (7:56) Carson Wiggs 27-yard field goal, Rice 24–22

Passing

- Purdue – Caleb TerBush: 18/31, 183 yards, 1 TD
- Rice – Taylor McHargue: 19/29, 230 yards, 2 TD

Rushing

- Purdue – Akeem Shavers: 11 att, 69 yards, 0 TD
- Rice – Sam McGuffie: 9 att, 48 yards, 0 TD

Receiving

- Purdue – Antavian Edison: 4 rec, 76 yards, 0 TD
- Rice – Luke Willson: 4 rec, 36 yards, 1 TD

=== Southeast Missouri State ===
SE Missouri St. at Purdue

Team	1	2	3	4	Total
Redhawks	0	0	0	0	0
• Boilermakers	17	21	7	14	59

- Date: September 17
- Location: Ross–Ade Stadium
  West Lafayette, Indiana
- Game start: 12:01 p.m. EST
- Elapsed time: 3:03
- Game attendance: 46,116
- Referee: Scott McElwee
- TV announcers (BTN): Wayne Larrivee, Joe Tiller & Jon Jansen

In the first ever meeting between the Redhawks and the Boilermakers, the Boilermakers did not have much trouble as they were able to defeat the Redhawks 59–0. The Purdue offense came out with early struggles, as they punted on their first possession and lost an O.J. Ross fumble on their second. Their 3rd drive was better, as they got their scoring started with a 19-yard Carson Wiggs field goal. After that, the Boilermakers power run game took over as Akeem Shavers scored twice in the first quarter on runs of 8 and 1 yards, Ralph Bolden scored twice in the seconds quarter on runs of 1 and 6 yards, and Akeem Hunt had two more scores on runs of 13 and 3 yards in the 4th. The team also welcomed back Robert Marve, who was returning to action for the first time since the 4th game of 2010, when he left the game after tearing his ACL. Marve delivered a touchdown on his first drive as he threw a 5-yard score to Gary Bush. Antavian Edison also added a 15-yard touchdown run in the 3rd quarter, as the Purdue offense ran for 393 yards (A Danny Hope era high).

Southeast Missouri State Redhawks at Purdue Boilermakers – Game summary

Quarter	1	2	3	4	Total
Redhawks	0	0	0	0	0
Boilermakers	17	21	7	14	59

at Ross–Ade Stadium, West Lafayette, Indiana

- Date: September 17
- Game time: 12:00 p.m. EDT
- Game attendance: 46,116
- Referee: Scott McElwee

Game information

1st quarter

- Purdue – (9:15) Carson Wiggs 19-yard field goal, Purdue 3–0
- Purdue – (5:45) Akeem Shavers 8-yard run (Carson Wiggs kick), Purdue 10–0
- Purdue – (1:01) Akeem Shavers 1-yard run (Carson Wiggs kick), Purdue 17–0

2nd quarter

- Purdue – (11:58) Ralph Bolden 1-yard run (Carson Wiggs kick), Purdue 24–0
- Purdue – (6:00) Gary Bush 5-yard pass from Robert Marve (Carson Wiggs kick), Purdue 31–0
- Purdue – (1:28) Ralph Bolden 6-yard run (Carson Wiggs kick), Purdue 38–0

3rd quarter

- Purdue – (5:48) Antavian Edison 15-yard run (Carson Wiggs kick), Purdue 45–0

4th quarter

- Purdue – (9:31) Akeem Hunt 13-yard rush (Carson Wiggs kick), Purdue 52–0
- Purdue – (2:24) Akeem Hunt 3-yard rush (Carson Wiggs kick), Purdue 59–0

Passing

- SE Missouri St. – Matt Scheible: 7/16, 61 yards, 0 TD
- Purdue – Caleb TerBush: 14/17, 143 yards, 0 TD

Rushing

- SE Missouri St. – Levi Terrell: 9 att, 33 yards, 0 TD
- Purdue – Akeem Shavers: 11 att, 75 yards, 2 TD

Receiving

- SE Missouri St. – Renard Celestin: 3 rec, 24 yards, 0 TD
- Purdue – Justin Siller: 5 rec, 61 yards, 0 TD

=== Notre Dame ===
Notre Dame at Purdue
(Shillelagh Trophy)

Team	1	2	3	4	Total
• Fighting Irish	14	7	14	3	38
Boilermakers	0	3	0	7	10

- Date: October 1
- Location: Ross–Ade Stadium
  West Lafayette, Indiana
- Game start: 8:06 p.m. EST
- Elapsed time: 3:21
- Game attendance: 61,555
- Referee: Jerry McGinn
- TV announcers (ESPN): Brad Nessler, Todd Blackledge & Holly Rowe
Notre Dame Fighting Irish at Purdue Boilermakers – Game summary

Quarter	1	2	3	4	Total
Fighting Irish	14	7	14	3	38
Boilermakers	0	3	0	7	10

at Ross–Ade Stadium, West Lafayette, Indiana

- Date: October 1
- Game time: 8:05 p.m. EDT
- Game attendance: 61,555
- Referee: Jerry McGinn

Game information

1st quarter

- Notre Dame – (14:36) Michael Floyd 35-yard pass from Tommy Rees (David Ruffer kick), Notre Dame 7–0
- Notre Dame – (0:03) Jonas Gray 2-yard run (David Ruffer kick), Notre Dame 14–0

2nd quarter

- Notre Dame – (9:06) Cierre Wood 55-yard run (David Ruffer kick), Notre Dame 21–0
- Purdue – (3:39) Carson Wiggs 27-yard field goal, Notre Dame 21–3

3rd quarter

- Notre Dame – (12:00) Tyler Eifert 6-yard pass from Tommy Rees (David Ruffer kick), Notre Dame 28–3
- Notre Dame – (2:07) T.J. Jones 11-yard pass from Tommy Rees (David Ruffer kick), Notre Dame 35–3

4th quarter

- Notre Dame – (8:06) David Ruffer 21-yard field goal, Notre Dame 38–3
- Purdue – (0:21) Antavian Edison 13-yard pass from Caleb TerBush (Carson Wiggs kick), Notre Dame 38–10

Passing

- Notre Dame – Tommy Rees: 24/40, 254 yards, 3 TD
- Purdue – Caleb TerBush: 10/15, 101 yards, 1 TD

Rushing

- Notre Dame – Cierre Wood: 20 att, 191 yards, 1 TD
- Purdue – Akeem Hunt: 3 att, 25 yards, 0 TD

Receiving

- Notre Dame – Michael Floyd: 12 rec, 137 yards, 1 TD
- Purdue – Antavian Edison: 7 rec, 105 yards, 1 TD

=== Minnesota ===
Minnesota at Purdue

Team	1	2	3	4	Total
Golden Gophers	0	3	7	7	17
• Boilermakers	24	7	14	0	45

- Date: October 8
- Location: Ross–Ade Stadium
  West Lafayette, Indiana
- Game start: 12:01 p.m. EST
- Elapsed time: 3:06
- Game attendance: 38,207
- Referee: Bill LeMonnier
- TV announcers (ESPN): Beth Mowins, Mike Bellotti & Shelley Smith
Minnesota Golden Gophers at Purdue Boilermakers – Game summary

Quarter	1	2	3	4	Total
Golden Gophers	0	3	7	7	17
Boilermakers	24	7	14	0	45

at Ross–Ade Stadium, West Lafayette, Indiana

- Date: October 8
- Game time: 12:00 p.m. EDT
- Game attendance: 38,207
- Referee: Bill LeMonnier

Game information

1st quarter

- Purdue – (10:10) Ralph Bolden 2-yard run (Carson Wiggs kick), Purdue 7–0
- Purdue – (5:18) Carson Wiggs 53-yard field goal, Purdue 10–0
- Purdue – (1:30) Akeem Shavers 1-yard run (Carson Wiggs kick), Purdue 17–0
- Purdue – (0:18) Ricardo Allen 37-yard interception return (Carson Wiggs kick), Purdue 24–0

2nd quarter

- Purdue – (4:08) O.J. Ross 12-yard pass from Robert Marve (Carson Wiggs kick), Purdue 31–0
- Minnesota – (1:27) Chris Hawthorne 47-yard field goal, Purdue 31–3

3rd quarter

- Purdue – (7:02) Akeem Shavers 10-yard pass from Caleb TerBush (Carson Wiggs kick), Purdue 38–3
- Purdue – (0:56) Raheem Mostert 25-yard run (Carson Wiggs kick), Purdue 45–3
- Minnesota – (0:43) Marcus Jones 92-yard kickoff return (Chris Hawthorne kick), Purdue 45–10

4th quarter

- Minnesota – (7:55) MarQueis Gray 1-yard run (Chris Hawthorne kick), Purdue 45–17

Passing

- Minnesota – MarQueis Gray: 8/20, 104 yards, 0 TD
- Purdue – Caleb TerBush: 14/21, 140 yards, 1 TD

Rushing

- Minnesota – Duane Bennett: 15 att, 53 yards, 0 TD
- Purdue – Akeem Hunt: 9 att, 60 yards, 0 TD

Receiving

- Minnesota – DaJon McKnight: 3 rec, 25 yards, 0 TD
- Purdue – O.J. Ross: 5 rec, 63 yards, 1 TD

=== Penn State ===
Purdue at Penn State

Team	1	2	3	4	Total
Boilermakers	3	3	6	6	18
• Nittany Lions	7	3	10	3	23

- Date: October 15
- Location: Beaver Stadium
  University Park, PA
- Game start: 12:01 p.m. EST
- Elapsed time: 3:20
- Game attendance: 100,820
- Referee: D. Witvoet
- TV announcers (BTN): Tom Hart, Derek Rackley & Lisa Byington
Purdue Boilermakers at Penn State Nittany Lions – Game summary

Quarter	1	2	3	4	Total
Boilermakers	3	3	6	6	18
Nittany Lions	7	3	10	3	23

at Beaver Stadium, University Park, PA

- Date: October 15
- Game time: 12:00 p.m. EDT
- Game attendance: 100,820
- Referee: D. Witvoet

Game information

1st quarter

- Penn State – (4:38) Curtis Dukes 1-yard run (Anthony Fera kick), Penn State 7–0
- Purdue – (1:39) Carson Wiggs 28-yard field goal, Penn State 7–3

2nd quarter

- Purdue – (4:36) Carson Wiggs 32-yard field goal, Penn State 7–6
- Penn State – (0:00) Anthony Fera 29-yard field goal, Penn State 10–6

3rd quarter

- Penn State – (5:57) Anthony Fera 40-yard field goal, Penn State 13–6
- Purdue – (4:02) O.J. Ross 14-yard pass from Caleb TerBush (Carson Wiggs kick failed), Penn State 13–12
- Penn State – (2:37) Silas Redd 9-yard run (Anthony Fera kick), Penn State 20–12

4th quarter

- Purdue – (8:08) Akeem Shavers 1-yard run (Caleb TerBush rush failed), Penn State 20–18
- Penn State – (6:24) Anthony Fera 29-yard field goal, Penn State 23–18

Passing

- Purdue – Caleb TerBush: 12/25, 162 yards, 1 TD
- Penn State – Matt McGloin: 8/17, 145 yards, 0 TD

Rushing

- Purdue – Ralph Bolden: 13 att, 97 yards, 0 TD
- Penn State – Silas Redd: 28 att, 131 yards, 1 TD

Receiving

- Purdue – Justin Siller: 5 rec, 67 yards, 0 TD
- Penn State – Justin Brown: 4 rec, 86 yards, 0 TD

=== Illinois ===
Illinois at Purdue
(Purdue Cannon)

Team	1	2	3	4	Total
#23 Fighting Illini	0	0	0	14	14
• Boilermakers	7	14	0	0	21

- Date: October 22
- Location: Ross–Ade Stadium
  West Lafayette, Indiana
- Game start: 12:01 p.m. EST
- Elapsed time: 3:06
- Game attendance: 45,146
- Referee: Dave Capron
- TV announcers (ESPN2): Beth Mowins, Mike Bellotti
Illinois Fighting Illini at Purdue Boilermakers – Game summary

Quarter	1	2	3	4	Total
# 23 Fighting Illini	0	0	0	14	14
Boilermakers	7	14	0	0	21

at Ross–Ade Stadium, West Lafayette, Indiana

- Date: October 22
- Game time: 12:00 p.m. EDT
- Game attendance: 61,555
- Referee: Jerry McGinn

Game information

1st quarter

- Purdue – (3:25) Justin Siller 6-yard pass from Caleb TerBush (Carson Wiggs kick), Purdue 7–0

2nd quarter

- Purdue – (11:41) Raheem Mostert 21-yard run (Carson Wiggs kick), Purdue 14–0
- Purdue – (7:48) Jared Crank 4-yard pass from Caleb TerBush (Carson Wiggs kick), Purdue 21–0

3rd quarter

4th quarter

- Illinois – (8:12) Jason Ford 16-yard run (Derek Dimke kick), Purdue 21–7
- Purdue – (0:54) Nathan Scheelhaase 2-yard run (Derek Dimke kick), Purdue 21–14

Passing

- Illinois – Nathan Scheelhaase: 22/35, 217 yards, 0 TD
- Purdue – Caleb TerBush: 16/25, 178 yards, 2 TD

Rushing

- Illinois – Jason Ford: 10 att, 83 yards, 1 TD
- Purdue – Akeem Shavers: 8 att, 29 yards, 0 TD

Receiving

- Illinois – A.J. Jenkins: 8 rec, 92 yards, 0 TD
- Purdue – Justin Siller: 3 rec, 45 yards, 1 TD

=== Michigan ===
Purdue at Michigan

Team	1	2	3	4	Total
Boilermakers	7	0	0	7	14
• #17 Wolverines	7	15	7	7	36

- Date: October 29
- Location: Michigan Stadium
  Ann Arbor
- Game start: 12:00 p.m. EST
- Elapsed time: 3:04
- Game attendance: 112,115
- Game weather: 46 °F (8 °C), Light Rain, SW 10–15 mph (16–24 km/h)
- Referee: A. Kemp
- TV announcers (ESPN2): Beth Mowins, Mike Bellotti & Shelley Smith

Purdue scored its only points of the first half when Caleb TerBush threw a 48-yard TD pass to Gary Bush. Michigan dominated the game following the Purdue score. The Wolverines responded to Purdue's touchdown with a touchdown of their own, a 2-yard run by Denard Robinson, which was its fifth consecutive opening drive TD. In the second quarter, Michigan scored a safety when Mike Martin tackled Caleb TerBush in the end zone. A few minutes later, Michigan's Brendan Gibbons kicked a 37-yard field goal. Michigan added more points with a 2-yard TD run by Fitzgerald Toussaint. The final score of the first half was a 22-yard Michigan field goal with no time left on the clock. After the intermission, Michigan scored the only points of the third quarter when Fitzgerald Toussaint scored his second TD of the game, this time on a 59-yard rush. The teams traded scores in the final quarter. First Michigan's Michael Shaw ran in a TD from 37 yards out, which was followed by Robert Marve throwing a 19-yard TD pass to O.J. Ross. With the win, Michigan's record against Purdue improved to 43–14.

Purdue Boilermakers at Michigan Wolverines – Game summary

Quarter	1	2	3	4	Total
Boilermakers	7	0	0	7	14
#17 Michigan	7	15	7	7	36

at Michigan Stadium, Ann Arbor, Michigan

- Date: October 29
- Game time: 12:00 p.m. EDT
- Game attendance: 112,115
- Referee: A. Kemp

Game information

1st quarter

- Purdue – (13:36) Gary Bush 48-yard pass from Caleb TerBush (Carson Wiggs kick), Purdue 7–0
- Michigan – (7:30) Denard Robinson 2-yard run (Brendan Gibbons kick), 7–7

2nd quarter

- Michigan – (14:13) Mike Martin safety, Michigan 9–7
- Michigan – (11:23) Brendan Gibbons 37-yard field goal, Michigan 12–7
- Michigan – (5:36) Fitzgerald Toussaint 2-yard run (Brendan Gibbons kick), Michigan 19–7
- Michigan – (0:00) Brendan Gibbons 22-yard field goal, Michigan 22–7

3rd quarter

- Michigan – (2:48) Fitzgerald Toussaint 59-yard run (Brendan Gibbons kick), Michigan 29–7

4th quarter

- Michigan – (12:32) Michael Shaw 37-yard run (Brendan Gibbons kick), Michigan 36–7
- Purdue – (0:15) O.J. Ross 19-yard pass from Robert Marve (Carson Wiggs kick), Michigan 36–14

Passing

- Purdue – Caleb TerBush: 9/13, 156 yards, 1 TD
- Michigan – Denard Robinson: 9/14, 170 yards, 0 TD

Rushing

- Purdue – Caleb TerBush: 3 att, 38 yards, 0 TD
- Michigan – Fitzgerald Toussaint: 20 att, 170 yards, 2 TD

Receiving

- Purdue – Justin Siller: 5 rec, 58 yards, 0 TD
- Michigan – Jeremy Gallon: 3 rec, 79 yards, 0 TD

=== Wisconsin ===
Purdue at Wisconsin

Team	1	2	3	4	Total
Boilermakers	10	7	0	0	17
• #19 Badgers	14	24	14	10	62

- Date: November 5
- Location: Camp Randall Stadium
  Madison, Wisconsin
- Game start: 2:36 p.m. CST
- Elapsed time: 3:21
- Game attendance: 80,566
- Game weather: 55 °F (13 °C), Partly Cloudy, S 17 mph (27 km/h)
- Referee: Scott McElwee
- TV announcers (ABC/ESPN2): Mike Patrick, Craig James, & Heather Cox
Purdue Boilermakers at Wisconsin Badgers – Game summary

Quarter	1	2	3	4	Total
Boilermakers	10	7	0	0	17
#19 Badgers	14	24	14	10	62

at Camp Randall Stadium, Madison, Wisconsin

- Date: November 5
- Game time: 2:30 p.m. CDT
- Game attendance: 80,566
- Referee: Scott McElwee

Game information

1st quarter

- Wisconsin – (12:47) Jacob Pedersen 2-yard pass from Russell Wilson (Philip Welch kick), Wisconsin 7–0
- Purdue – (12:24) Crosby Wright 30-yard pass from Caleb TerBush (Carson Wiggs kick), 7–7
- Wisconsin – (3:24) Jared Abbrederis 5-yard pass from Russell Wilson (Philip Welch kick), Wisconsin 14–7
- Purdue – (1:13) Carson Wiggs 25-yard field goal, Wisconsin 14–10

2nd quarter

- Wisconsin – (12:14) Montee Ball 1-yard run (Philip Welch kick), Wisconsin 21–10
- Wisconsin – (6:16) Russell Wilson 6-yard run (Philip Welch kick), Wisconsin 28–10
- Wisconsin – (2:59) Montee Ball 3-yard run (Philip Welch kick), Wisconsin 35–10
- Purdue – (0:24) Justin Siller 2-yard run (Carson Wiggs kick), Wisconsin 35–17
- Wisconsin – (0:00) Philip Welch 52-yard field goal, Wisconsin 38–17

3rd quarter

- Wisconsin – (12:01) Montee Ball 29-yard run (Philip Welch kick), Wisconsin 45–17
- Wisconsin – (11:01) James White 5-yard run (Philip Welch kick), Wisconsin 52–17

4th quarter

- Wisconsin – (12:59) James White 1-yard run (Philip Welch kick), Wisconsin 59–17
- Wisconsin – (5:02) Kyle French 29-yard field goal, Wisconsin 62–17

Passing

- Purdue – Caleb TerBush: 10/19, 103 yards, 1 TD
- Wisconsin – Russell Wilson: 15/20, 205 yards, 2 TD

Rushing

- Purdue – Ralph Bolden: 9 att, 49 yards, 0 TD
- Wisconsin – Montee Ball: 20 att, 223 yards, 3 TD

Receiving

- Purdue – Crosby Wright: 2 rec, 46 yards, 1 TD
- Wisconsin – Jeff Duckworth: 2 rec, 78 yards, 0 TD

=== Ohio State ===
Ohio State at Purdue

Team	1	2	3	4	OT	Total
Buckeyes	0	7	7	6	3	23
• Boilermakers	10	7	0	3	6	26

- Date: November 12
- Location: Ross–Ade Stadium
  West Lafayette, Indiana
- Game start: 12:00 p.m. EST
- Elapsed time: 3:32
- Game attendance: 43,334
- Game weather: 56 °F (13 °C), Mostly Sunny, SW 11 mph (18 km/h)
- Referee: Todd Geerlings
- TV announcers (BTN): Tom Hart, Derek Rackley & Lisa Byington
Ohio State Buckeyes at Purdue Boilermakers – Game summary

Quarter	1	2	3	4	OT	Total
Buckeyes	0	7	7	6	3	23
Boilermakers	10	7	0	3	6	26

at Ross–Ade Stadium, West Lafayette, Indiana

- Date: November 12
- Game time: 12:00 p.m. EDT
- Game attendance: 43,334
- Referee: Todd Geerlings

Game information

1st quarter

- Purdue – (10:30) Carson Wiggs 19-yard field goal, Purdue 3–0
- Purdue – (4:09) Akeem Shavers 4-yard run (Carson Wiggs kick), Purdue 10–0

2nd quarter

- Ohio State – (11:42) Jordan Hall 38-yard pass from Braxton Miller (Drew Basil kick), Purdue 10–7
- Purdue – (3:19) Ralph Bolden 7-yard run (Carson Wiggs kick), Purdue 17–7

3rd quarter

- Ohio State – (9:42) Braxton Miller 6-yard run (Drew Basil kick), Purdue 17–14

4th quarter

- Purdue – (13:06) Carson Wiggs 44-yard field goal, Purdue 20–14
- Ohio State – (11:42) Jordan Hall 13-yard pass from Braxton Miller (Drew Basil kick blocked), 20–20

Overtime

- Ohio State – (0:00) Drew Basil 33-yard field goal, Ohio State 23–20
- Purdue – (0:00) Robert Marve 1-yard run, Purdue 26–23

Passing

- Ohio State – Braxton Miller: 8/18, 132 yards, 2 TD
- Purdue – Caleb TerBush: 15/24, 140 yards, 0 TD

Rushing

- Ohio State – Dan Herron: 18 att, 62 yards, 0 TD
- Purdue – Ralph Bolden: 18 att, 80 yards, 1 TD

Receiving

- Ohio State – Jordan Hall: 3 rec, 58 yards, 2 TD
- Purdue – Justin Siller: 6 rec, 45 yards, 0 TD

=== Iowa ===
Iowa at Purdue

Team	1	2	3	4	Total
• Hawkeyes	14	7	3	7	31
Boilermakers	7	7	0	7	21

- Date: November 9
- Location: Ross–Ade Stadium
  West Lafayette, Indiana
- Game start: 12:00 p.m. EST
- Elapsed time: 3:17
- Game attendance: 40,106
- Game weather: 56 °F (13 °C), Mostly Sunny, SW 11 mph (18 km/h)
- Referee: John O'Neill
- TV announcers (BTN): Tom Hart, Derek Rackley & Lisa Byington
Iowa Hawkeyes at Purdue Boilermakers – Game summary

Quarter	1	2	3	4	Total
Hawkeyes	14	7	3	7	31
Boilermakers	7	7	0	7	21

at Ross–Ade Stadium, West Lafayette, Indiana

- Date: November 19
- Game time: 12:00 p.m. EDT
- Game attendance: 40,106
- Referee: John O'Neill

Game information

1st quarter

- Iowa – (11:46) Marvin McNutt 26-yard pass from James Vandenberg (Mike Meyer kick), Iowa 7–0
- Purdue – (6:43) Gabe Holmes 16-yard pass from Caleb TerBush (Carson Wiggs kick), 7–7
- Iowa – (0:10) C.J. Fiedorowicz 5-yard pass from James Vandenberg (Mike Meyer kick), Iowa 14–7

2nd quarter

- Purdue – (4:49) Brandon Taylor 0-yard fumble recovery (Carson Wiggs kick), 14–14
- Iowa – (0:31) Marcus Coker 2-yard run (Mike Meyer kick), Iowa 21–14

3rd quarter

- Iowa – (2:04) Mike Meyer 38-yard field goal, Iowa 24–14

4th quarter

- Iowa – (14:54) Marvin McNutt 51-yard pass from James Vandenberg (Mike Meyer kick), Iowa 31–14
- Purdue – (11:58) Ralph Bolden 11-yard run (Carson Wiggs kick), Iowa 31–21

Passing

- Iowa – James Vandenburg: 22/32, 273 yards, 3 TD
- Purdue – Caleb TerBush: 10/16, 86 yards, 1 TD

Rushing

- Iowa – Marcus Coker: 30 att, 139 yards, 1 TD
- Purdue – Ralph Bolden: 14 att, 71 yards, 1 TD

Receiving

- Iowa – Marvin McNutt: 9 rec, 151 yards, 2 TD
- Purdue – Antavian Edison: 9 rec, 97 yards, 0 TD

=== Indiana ===
Purdue at Indiana
(Old Oaken Bucket)

Team	1	2	3	4	Total
• Boilermakers	7	16	0	10	33
Hoosiers	14	3	0	8	25

- Date: November 26
- Location: Memorial Stadium
  Bloomington, Indiana
- Game start: 3:30 p.m. EST
- Elapsed time: 3:25
- Game attendance: 42,005
- Game weather: 65 °F (18 °C), Cloudy, S 17 mph (27 km/h)
- Referee: Dennis Lipski
- TV announcers (BTN): Matt Devlin, Glen Mason & Jon Jansen
Purdue Boilermakers at Indiana Hoosiers – Game summary

Quarter	1	2	3	4	Total
Boilermakers	7	16	0	10	33
Hoosiers	14	3	0	8	25

at Memorial Stadium, Bloomington, Indiana

- Date: November 29
- Game time: 3:30 p.m. EDT
- Game attendance: 42,005
- Referee: Dennis Lipski

Game information

1st quarter

- Indiana – (6:50) Stephen Houston 52-yard run (Mitch Ewald kick), Indiana 7–0
- Purdue – (2:39) Antavian Edison 14-yard pass from Caleb TerBush (Carson Wiggs kick), 7–7
- Indiana – (1:05) D'Angelo Roberts 6-yard run (Mitch Ewald kick), Indiana 14–7

2nd quarter

- Purdue – (13:01) Carson Wiggs 29-yard field goal, Indiana 14–10
- Indiana – (8:55) Mitch Ewald 32-yard field goal, Indiana 17–10
- Purdue – (8:37) Ralph Bolden 8-yard run (Carson Wiggs kick), 17–17
- Purdue – (4:26) Carson Wiggs 43-yard field goal, Purdue 20–17
- Purdue – (0:05) Carson Wiggs 48-yard field goal, Purdue 23–17

3rd quarter
4th quarter

- Purdue – (13:13) Carson Wiggs 22-yard field goal, Purdue 26–17
- Purdue – (11:04) Antavian Edison 5-yard run (Carson Wiggs kick), Purdue 33–17
- Indiana – (8:22) D'Angelo Roberts 5-yard run (Shane Wynn pass from Tre Roberson), Purdue 33–25

Passing

- Purdue – Caleb TerBush: 16/25, 192 yards, 1 TD
- Indiana – Tre Roberson: 17/26, 147 yards, 0 TD

Rushing

- Purdue – Akeem Hunt: 10 att, 100 yards, 0 TD
- Indiana – Stephen Houston: 7 att, 129 yards, 1 TD

Receiving

- Purdue – Antavian Edison: 3 rec, 50 yards, 1 TD
- Indiana – Kofi Hughes: 5 rec, 64 yards, 0 TD

== Statistics ==
=== Team ===
	Purdue	Opp
Scoring	350	349
Points per game	26.9	26.8
First downs	267	285
Rushing	127	123
Passing	123	135
Penalty	17	27
Total offense	4,899	5,147
Avg per play	5.3	5.5
Avg per game	376.8	395.9
Fumbles-Lost	21-9	20-9
Penalties-Yards	96-782	71-641
Avg per game	60.2	49.3

	Team	Opp
Punts-Yards	68-2,756	66-2,598
Avg per punt	40.5	39.4
Time of possession/Game	29:18	30:42
3rd down conversions	79	75
4th down conversions	4	11
Touchdowns scored	42	43
Field goals-Attempts-Long	19-25-53	15-21-52
PAT-Attempts	39-40	40-41
Attendance	316,574	360,823
Games/Avg per Game	7/45,225	5/72,165

==== Scores by quarter ====
	1	2	3	4	OT	Total
Purdue	109	122	36	77	6	350
Opponents	88	97	79	82	3	349

=== Offense ===
==== Rushing ====
Name	GP	Att	Gain	Loss	Net	Avg	TD	Long	Avg/G
Ralph Bolden	12	148	710	36	674	4.6	6	39	56.2
Akeem Shavers	12	111	534	15	519	4.7	6	44	43.2
Akeem Hunt	12	33	299	12	287	8.7	2	50	23.9
Caleb TerBush	13	83	333	114	219	2.6	1	41	16.8
Antavian Edison	13	30	135	11	124	4.1	2	15	9.5
Reggie Pegram	13	22	110	1	109	5.0	1	17	8.4
Raheem Mostert	12	16	110	2	108	6.8	2	25	9.0
Jared Crank	11	29	112	6	106	3.7	0	14	9.6
Justin Siller	13	15	87	6	81	3.7	1	14	9.6
Brandon Cottom	11	8	70	0	70	8.8	0	27	6.4
Robert Marve	10	29	103	52	51	1.8	1	15	5.1
O.J. Ross	12	3	24	4	20	6.7	0	20	1.7
Waynelle Gravesande	12	1	4	0	4	4.0	0	4	0.3
Gary Bush	13	1	2	0	2	2.0	0	1	0.2
Kurt Freytag	4	1	0	0	0	0.0	0	0	0.0
Sean Robinson	1	1	0	2	-2	-2.0	0	0	-2.0
Team	9	4	0	11	-11	-2.8	0	0	-1.2
Total	13	535	2,633	272	2,361	4.4	22	50	181.6

==== Passing ====
Name	GP	Effic	Att-Cmp-Int	Pct	Yds	TD	Lng	Avg/G
Caleb TerBush	13	130.7	277-171-6	61.7	1,905	13	50	146.5
Robert Marve	10	107.7	109-61-5	56.0	633	4	33	63.3
Sean Robinson	1	0.0	2-0-0	0.0	0	0	0	0.0
Tommie Thomas	9	0.0	1-0-0	0.0	0	0	0	0.0
Team	9	0.0	1-0-0	0.0	0	0	0	0.0
Justin Siller	13	100.0	1-1-0	100.0	0	0	0	0.0
Total	13	122.8	391-233-11	59.6	2,538	17	50	195.2

==== Receiving ====
Name	GP	No.	Yds	Avg	TD	Long	Avg/G
Justin Siller	13	50	474	9.5	1	50	36.5
Antavian Edison	13	44	584	13.3	3	35	44.9
O.J. Ross	12	33	356	10.8	3	28	29.7
Gary Bush	13	29	310	10.7	3	48	23.8
Waynelle Gravesande	12	18	177	9.8	0	21	14.8
Crosby Wright	13	16	223	13.9	2	30	17.2
Ralph Bolden	12	13	129	9.9	0	33	10.8
Gabe Holmes	11	11	133	12.1	1	23	12.1
Reggie Pegram	13	8	59	7.4	1	20	4.5
Akeem Shavers	12	5	58	11.6	1	15	4.8
Justin Sinz	12	3	25	8.3	0	9	2.1
Jared Crank	11	2	6	3.0	2	4	0.5
Akeem Hunt	12	1	4	4.0	0	4	0.3
Total	13	233	2,538	10.9	17	50	195.2

=== Defense ===
Name	GP	Tackles				Sacks	Pass defense	Interceptions				Fumbles		Blkd Kick
Name	GP	Solo	Ast	Total	TFL-Yds	No-Yds	BrUp	No.-Yds	Avg	TD	Long	Rcv-Yds	FF	Blkd Kick
Joe Holland	13	52	42	94	10.5-34	1.5-10	8	1-0	0.0	0	0	0-0	0	0
Dwayne Beckford	13	46	45	91	7-27	3.0-21	4	1-1	1.0	0	0	0-0	1	0
Will Lucas	13	46	36	82	10-20	1-5	1	0-0	0.0	0	0	2-0	2	0
Ricardo Allen	13	62	19	81	3-6	0-0	4	3-37	12.4	1	37	0-0	1	1
Albert Evans	13	52	21	73	2.5-5	0-0	4	2-71	35.5	0	55	0-0	0	0
Josh Johnson	13	47	17	64	4.5-24	0-0	9	2-0	0.0	0	0	0-0	1	0
Logan Link	13	29	26	55	0-0	0-0	2	0-0	0.0	0	0	0-0	0	0
Kawann Short	13	28	26	54	17-53	6.5-31	2	0-0	0.0	0	0	1-0	1	2
Total	13	537	385	922	85-304	22-151	42	12-142	11.8	1	55	8-24	11	4

=== Special teams ===
Name	Punting								Kickoffs				
Name	No.	Yds	Avg	Long	TB	FC	I20	Blkd	No.	Yds	Avg	TB	OB
Cody Webster	45	1,931	42.9	66	0	6	11	0					
Carson Wiggs	23	804	35.0	54	2	11	17	1	71	4,652	65.5	24	2
Team	0	21	21.0	21	0	0	0	1					
Total	68	2,756	40.5	66	2	17	28	2	71	4,652	65.5	24	2

Name	Punt returns					Kick returns				
Name	No.	Yds	Avg	TD	Long	No.	Yds	Avg	TD	Long
Raheem Mostert						25	837	33.5	1	99
O.J. Ross						9	202	22.4	0	41
Akeem Hunt						7	173	24.7	0	42
Waynelle Gravesande	22	129	5.9	0	31					
T.J. Barbarette						2	47	23.5	0	26
Ricardo Allen	1	7	7.0	0	7					
Brandon Cottom						1	3	3.0	0	3
Total	23	136	5.9	0	31	44	1,262	28.7	1	99

== After the season ==
=== 2012 NFL draft ===
Player	Position	Round	Pick	NFL Club
Dennis Kelly	Offensive tackle	5	153	Philadelphia Eagles
Nick Mondek	Offensive tackle	6	195	Houston Texans

=== Comments ===
At the conclusion of the regular season, Purdue had clinched its first bowl appearance since the 2007 season. Their 6–6 record (4–4 in the Big Ten) placed them 7th in the conference and earned a spot in the 2011 Little Caesars Pizza Bowl against Western Michigan.

=== Awards ===
2nd Team All-Big Ten (coaches vote)

- Kicker – Carson Wiggs
- Defensive Lineman – Kawann Short
- Defensive Back – Ricardo Allen
- Punter – Cody Webster

Honorable Mention All-Big Ten (coaches vote)

- Dennis Kelly
- Joe Holland

2nd Team All-Big Ten (Media vote)

- Punter – Cody Webster

Honorable Mention All-Big Ten (Media vote)

- Ricardo Allen
- Dwayne Beckford
- Joe Holland
- Dennis Kelly
- Carson Wiggs

Big Ten Sportsmanship Award Honoree

- Joe Holland
