= 2011 Little Caesars Pizza Bowl =

Western Michigan Broncos	Purdue Boilermakers
(7–5)	(6–6)
MAC	Big Ten
32	37
Head coach: Bill Cubit	Head coach: Danny Hope
	1	2	3	4	Total
Western Michigan	8	7	10	7	32
Purdue	7	20	7	3	37
- Date: December 27, 2011
- Season: 2011
- Stadium: Ford Field
- Location: Detroit, Michigan
- MVP: Defense: Joe Holland (LB, Purdue); Offense: Akeem Shavers (RB, Purdue)
- Favorite: Purdue by 2½
- Referee: Robert Cameron (WAC)
- Attendance: 46,177
- Payout: US$600,000 per team

United States TV coverage
- Network: ESPN
- Announcers: Beth Mowins (Play-by-Play); Mike Bellotti (Analyst); Eamon McAnaney (Sidelines)
- Nielsen ratings: 1.66

The 2011 Little Caesars Pizza Bowl, the 15th edition of the game, was a post-season American college football bowl game that was held on December 27, 2011 at Ford Field in Detroit, Michigan as part of the 2011–12 NCAA bowl season.

The game, which was telecast at 4:30 pm ET on ESPN, featured the Western Michigan Broncos from the Mid-American Conference versus the Purdue Boilermakers from the Big Ten Conference. The Purdue Boilermakers defeated the Western Michigan Broncos 37–32 for the victory.

== Teams ==
The 2011 Little Caesars Pizza Bowl was the third ever football meeting between the two universities. Purdue led the all-time series 2–0 coming into the game.

=== Purdue Boilermakers ===
Purdue make its first bowl appearance since 2007, when they defeated Central Michigan in the 2007 Motor City Bowl. In 2011, the Boilermakers finished sixth in the Big Ten Conference. They came into the game with a 6–6 overall record. They were led by an outstanding special teams (first in the Big Ten in kickoff return average and second in the nation) unit that helped them start with favorable field position. Purdue played the game without their leading rusher Ralph Bolden, who tore his ACL in final game of the season.

Purdue's spread offense is led by Akeem Shavers in rushing (89 rushes, 370 yards, six TDs), Caleb TerBush in passing (163–264, 1,804 yards, 12 TDs), and in receiving by both Justin Siller (45 catches, 430 yards, one touchdown) and Antavion Edison (43 catches, 561 yards, three TDs).

=== Western Michigan Broncos ===
Western Michigan enters the bowl with a 7–5 overall record. The Broncos are making their first bowl appearance since 2008 when they lost to Rice in the Texas Bowl. It is the Broncos third bowl in the last five seasons. They are led by their passing offense (first in the MAC in passing yards and touchdowns and eighth in the nation). Three of the Broncos' losses are by four points or less.

The Broncos are led in rushing by Tevin Drake (102 rushes, 570 yards, four TDs) and quarterback Alex Carder (114 rushes, 253 yards, four TDs); Carder in passing (299–445, 3,434 yards, 28 TDs); and Jordan White in receiving (127 catches, 1,646 yards, 16 TDs). White leads the NCAA FBS in receptions and receiving yards and is second in receiving touchdowns.

== Game summary ==
Taking advantage of a Purdue fumble, the Broncos scored first on a 49-yard flea flicker to go up 8–0 after making a two-point conversion. Purdue responded by with its own touchdown to cut the deficit to 8–7 at the end of the first quarter. The Boilermakers then recovered an onside kick to keep the ball in their possession.

Purdue was unable to capitalize on the onside kick, fumbling the ball at WMU's 14-yard line. On the next drive, however, WMU threw an interception, which led to a Purdue field goal. On the next drive, WMU scored on a one-yard touchdown pass to Josh Schaffer to take the lead 15–10. On the ensuing kickoff, though, Purdue's Raheem Mostert returned the kickoff 99-yards for a touchdown, making it 17–15 Purdue. The Boilermakers then recovered their second onside kick of the game on the kickoff. This time, the Boilermakers were able to capitalize, going up 24–15 on a Reggie Pegram rushing touchdown. After the Broncos turned the ball over on downs, the Boilermakers added to their lead on a 19-yard Carson Wiggs field goal to make it 27–15 at the end of the first half.

In the third quarter, the Broncos were able to cut the deficit 27–18 on a 21-yard John Potter field goal. Purdue then added to their lead on a 33-yard passing touchdown to make it 34–18. On the next Broncos drive, quarterback Alex Carder's pass was intercepted by Purdue's Gerald Gooden at Purdue's six-yard line. However, Gooden fumbled the ball on the return, giving the ball back to the Broncos at the Purdue 29-yard line. Continuing the drive, the Broncos scored on a one-yard Tevin Drake rushing touchdown make it 34–25 going into the fourth quarter.

In the fourth quarter, the Boilermakers added to their lead on a 26-yard Carson Wiggs field goal to make it 37–25. On the next drive, WMU turned the ball over on an interception. The Broncos were able to get the ball back after forcing Purdue to punt. On the next Broncos drive on a fourth-and-10 play at Purdue's 12-yard line, Carder fumbled the ball after being sacked. Purdue's Ryan Russell recovered the ball but fumbled on the return, giving the ball back to the Broncos. Continuing the drive, the Broncos cut the lead 37–32 on a five-yard touchdown pass to Chleb Ravenell. After forcing Purdue to punt, the Broncos had one last chance to win the game. However, Carder fumbled the ball, giving the ball to the Boilermakers. The Boilermakers were then able to run the clock out to seal a victory.

With the win, Purdue won its first bowl game since the 2007 Motor City Bowl. With the loss, WMU fell 0–5 all time in bowl games.

== Scoring summary ==
Scoring summary

Quarter	Time	Drive			Team	Scoring information	Score	
Quarter	Time	Plays	Yards	TOP	Team	Scoring information	WMU	Purdue
1	9:14	1	49	0:08	WMU	Jordan White 49-yard touchdown reception from Alex Carder, 2-point run by John Potter good	8	0
1	0:17	9	38	4:05	Purdue	Reggie Pegram 1-yard touchdown reception from Robert Marve, Carson Wiggs kick good	8	7
2	10:34	4	3	2:07	Purdue	49-yard field goal by Carson Wiggs	8	10
2	7:00	12	78	3:34	WMU	Josh Schaffer 1-yard touchdown reception from Alex Carder, John Potter kick good	15	10
2	6:48	1	99	0:12	Purdue	Raheem Mostert 99-yard kickoff return (Carson Wiggs kick)	15	17
2	4:57	6	61	1:51	Purdue	Reggie Pegram 1-yard touchdown run, Carson Wiggs kick good	15	24
2	0:00	8	42	3:17	Purdue	19-yard field goal by Carson Wiggs	15	27
3	10:55	8	66	4:05	WMU	21-yard field goal by John Potter	18	27
3	6:49	4	80	1:44	Purdue	Gary Bush 33-yard touchdown reception from Caleb TerBush, Carson Wiggs kick good	18	34
3	1:55	6	29	1:43	WMU	Tevin Drake 1-yard touchdown run, John Potter kick good	25	34
4	11:41	11	64	5:14	Purdue	26-yard field goal by Carson Wiggs	25	37
4	4:28	5	87	1:22	WMU	Chleb Ravenell 5-yard touchdown reception from Alex Carder, John Potter kick good	32	37
"TOP" = time of possession. For other American football terms, see Glossary of American football.							32	37

=== Statistics ===
Statistic	WMU	Purdue
First downs	30	23
Rushes–yards (net)	23–46	56–265
Passing yards (net)	439	177
Passes, att–comp–int	58–31–4	21–15–0
Total offense, plays – yards	81–485	77–442
Time of possession	24:06	35:54
