= Caleb TerBush =

American football player and coach (born 1990)

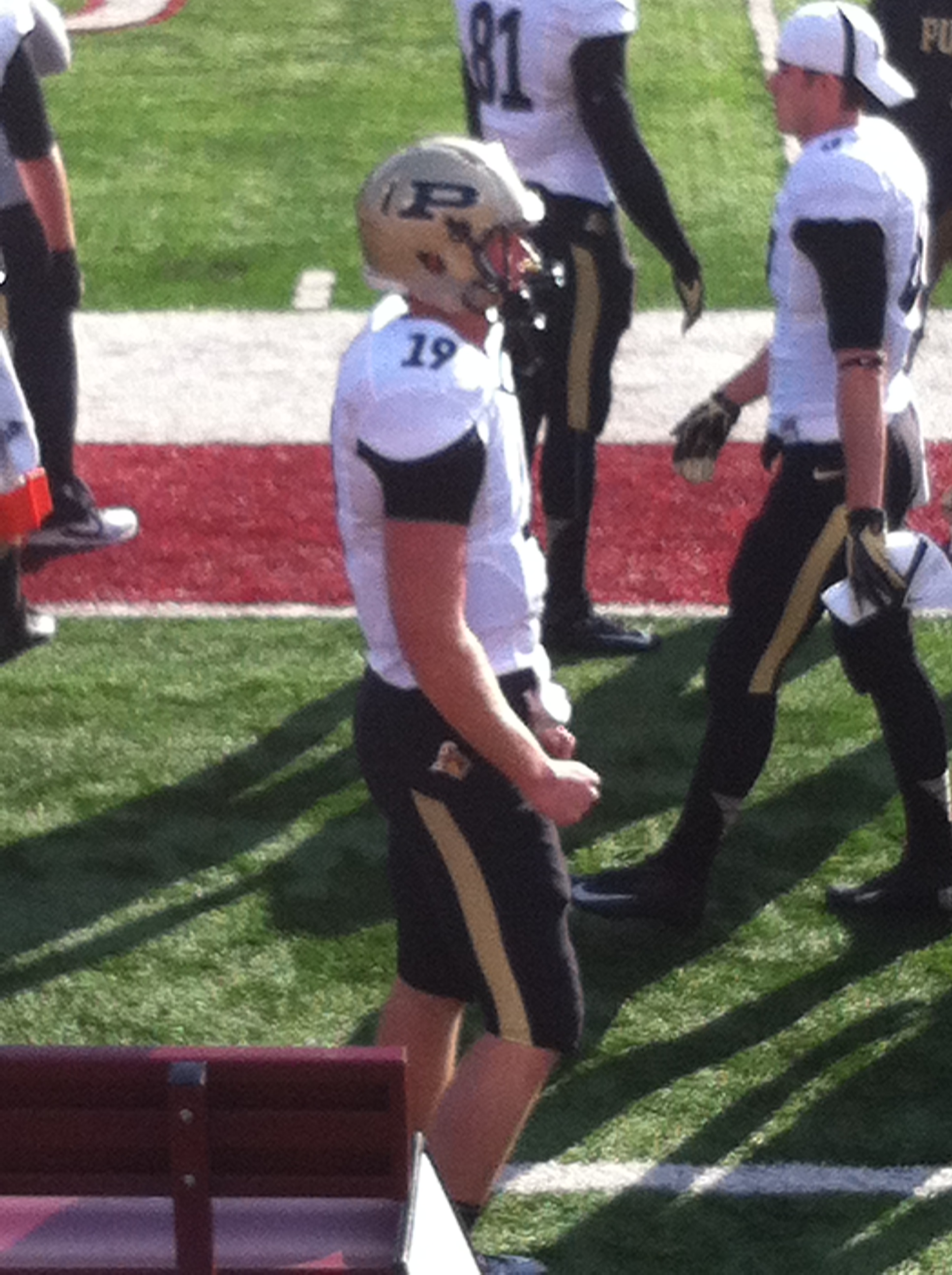
- TerBush in 2012

No. 2
- Position: Quarterback

Personal information
- Born: January 5, 1990 (age 36)
- Listed height: 6 ft 5 in (1.96 m)
- Listed weight: 225 lb (102 kg)

Career information
- High school: Metamora Township (Metamora, Illinois)
- College: Purdue (2008–2012)
- NFL draft: 2013: undrafted

Career history

Playing
- Arizona Cardinals (2013)*
- * Offseason or practice squad member only

Coaching
- Metamora (IL) Township (2017–2019) Quarterbacks

Caleb Stephen TerBush (born January 5, 1990) is an American former football quarterback. He played for the Purdue University Boilermakers and was briefly signed by the Arizona Cardinals of the National Football League from May to August 2013.

== Early life ==
TerBush went to Metamora Township High School in Metamora, Illinois. There he was a three sport athlete. For football he was coached by Pat Ryan, and led his squad to 14–0 record and Class 5A state championship. After the season, he was named first team all-area and all-conference, and special mention all-state after passing for 1,575 yards and 16 touchdowns with just three interceptions, while rushing for 859 yards with 16 touchdowns. As a result, he was selected team co-Most Valuable Player. As a freshman and junior, he played as a wide receiver. As a college recruit, he was listed as a three-star prospect ranked as the #32 quarterback nationally by Scout.com, and ranked as #6 player in Illinois by Rivals.com.

College recruiting
Name	Hometown	School	Height	Weight	40^{‡}	Commit date
Caleb TerBush; QB	Metamora, Illinois	Metamora Township High School	6 ft 5 in (1.96 m)	215 lb (98 kg)	4.6	Sep 29, 2007
Caleb TerBush; QB	Recruit ratings: Scout: Rivals: (NR)					
Overall recruit ranking: Scout: 32 (QB) Rivals: -- (QB), 6 (IL) ESPN: -- (QB)
Note: In many cases, Scout, Rivals, 247Sports, On3, and ESPN may conflict in their listings of height and weight.; In these cases, the average was taken. ESPN grades are on a 100-point scale.; Sources: "Purdue Football Commitment List (26)". Rivals.; "Purdue College Football Recruiting Commits". Scout.; "ESPN". ESPN.; "Scout.com Team Recruiting Rankings". Scout.; "2008 Team Ranking". Rivals.com.

TerBush committed to Purdue University on September 29, 2007. TerBush was not heavily recruited, and was discovered at Joe Tiller's passing camp, the same way Purdue found former Boilermaker great Kyle Orton.

== College career ==
=== 2008–2010 seasons ===
During the 2008 season, his first year, TerBush redshirted to gain a better grasp of the college game and the Purdue playbook. In 2009, TerBush was a backup to Joey Elliott, and only played in one game, a contest against the Wisconsin Badgers on October 31. He completed four of ten passes for 22 yards. He also received team's Newcomer Award - Offense for spring practice in 2009. As a sophomore, TerBush missed all of the 2010 season with academic problems.

=== 2011 season ===
Terbush was named the starter for the 2011 season opener, after an injury to Rob Henry, and with Robert Marve still nursing an injured ACL. He led the Boilermakers to a 27–24 victory over Middle Tennessee State in his first career start. In the game, he was 19-of-33 passing for 219 yards (a career-high). He also had a career-high, two touchdown passes in the game, while throwing one interception. Against Rice, TerBush threw for 183 yards along with a touchdown pass, while also running for 68 yards and another score. The Boilermakers lost the game 24–22, as TerBush suffered his first loss as a collegiate starting quarterback. For the Southeast Missouri State game, Marve returned from his injury and was named TerBush's backup. TerBush completed 14 of 17 passes in the game for 143, as the Boilermakers won 59–0. Against Notre Dame, TerBush completed 10 of 15 passes for 101 yards, as well as a touchdown pass and an interception. TerBush started the game, but there was also significant playing time for Marve. The following week against Minnesota, he made his first career Big Ten start. The Boilermakers went on to win the game 45–17 with TerBush and Marve splitting time again. For the game he completed 14 of 21 passes for 140 yards and a touchdown.

The following week TerBush led the Boilermakers into Penn State, where he completed 12 of 25 passes for 162 yards with a touchdown and two very costly interceptions. TerBush had the Boilermakers in a position to tie the game in the third quarter, when he hit O.J. Ross with a 14-yard touchdown pass to make the game 13–12. The extra point was missed, spoiling Purdue's momentum. Purdue had a promising drive come to an abrupt halt when TerBush's pass was tipped and then intercepted by Nick Sukay. TerBush went on to lead Purdue to another scoring drive to make it 20–18 with 8:08 left in the fourth quarter, but a late attempt to make a comeback was foiled when he threw another interception with 1:59 remaining. The Boilermakers lost 23–18. On October 22, TerBush passed for 178 yards and tied a career-high with two touchdown passes to lead Purdue to a 21–14 upset victory over No. 23 Illinois. The following week, TerBush completed 9 of 13 passes for 156 yards and a touchdown, while splitting time with Marve. It was the first time in his career that he led the team in rushing yards for a game. Purdue lost the game 36–14 to the 17th-ranked Michigan Wolverines, in Michigan Stadium. On November 5, TerBush led the Boilermakers into Camp Randall Stadium to face the No. 19 Wisconsin Badgers. After Wisconsin got an early lead, TerBush led the Purdue offense down the field using three plays, capped by a 30-yard touchdown pass to Crosby Wright, to tie the game. The game had all the makings of a shootout from the end of the first quarter, with the score 14–10 in favor of Wisconsin, but the Purdue offense was slowed after that with TerBush throwing two interceptions. He was later pulled in favor of Robert Marve, who did not have much success either. TerBush ended the game completing 10 of 19 passes for 103 yards.

TerBush started the Ohio State game, and quickly got Purdue up 10–0. After two consecutive drives that ended in Purdue punts, he was benched in favor of Marve. With Marve's first drive, he led the team on an 88-yard touchdown drive. In the second half, Marve started, but the offense came out flat and TerBush was brought back in. After two drives, and no points, Marve was put in again. TerBush ended the game completing 15 for 24 for 140 yards. Purdue went on to win the game 26–23 in overtime with Marve scoring the game-winning touchdown. Despite Marve leading the team to a victory against Ohio State, TerBush would remain the starter against Iowa the following week, needing a win to become bowl eligible. TerBush would keep the team in game in the first half, throwing a touchdown to Gabe Holmes and keeping the Boilermakers within seven points at halftime. After starting the second half slowly, he was replaced by Marve. The Boilermakers went on to lose the game 31–21. After the loss to Iowa, Purdue entered the final game of the regular season needing a win, against rival Indiana, to become bowl eligible. TerBush led seven Purdue scoring drives, completing 16 of 25 passes for 192 yards and a touchdown pass, leading to a 33–25 victory. With the win, TerBush became the first Purdue quarterback the team to a record of .500 or better since Curtis Painter did it in 2007. The Boilermakers won the 2011 Little Caesars Pizza Bowl, against Western Michigan, with TerBush completing 8 of 13 passes for 101 yards and a touchdown. With the win, TerBush helped clinched the school's first winning record since 2007.

=== 2012 season ===
During spring practice, TerBush was named a captain for the 2012 season. TerBush entered his senior season looking at splitting playing time once again with Marve, and now the fully recovered Henry. With TerBush working mostly with the first team, he was expected to start the first game of the year, until it was announced (one hour prior to gametime) that he had been suspended and Marve was the starting quarterback. Marve responded by having the best game of his Boilermaker career, throwing for 295 yards and 3 touchdowns, in a 48–6 win over Eastern Kentucky. TerBush returned to his starting role the following week against rival, Notre Dame. TerBush played the entire first quarter for the Boilermakers, but since the Boilermakers were head scoreless, Marve replaced TerBush at quarterback in the second quarter. Marve moved the ball for Purdue, leading them on two scoring drives resulting in 10 points. Marve had Purdue close to scoring again in the 4th quarter, when he was sacked and re-injured his knee. TerBush came in during the drive and threw the game tying score to Antavian Edison. Purdue would lose on the next drive as Notre Dame made a game-winning field goal. The following week, Purdue played Eastern Michigan, and with Marve sidelined with his third ACL tear, TerBush was the unquestioned starter for the first time since the 2011 season opener against Middle Tennessee State. TerBush played the first three quarters of the game, until the Purdue took a large enough lead that Henry could get substantial playing time. TerBush finished the game with 2 passing touchdowns, and added another score on a 2-yard rush in the 2nd quarter.

=== Statistics ===
Through the end of the 2012 season, TerBush's statistics are as follows:

		Passing								Rushing		
Season	Team	GP	Rating	Att	Comp	Pct	Yds	TD	INT	Att	Yds	TD
2009	Purdue	1	58.5	10	4	40	22	0	0	2	-8	0
2011	Purdue	13	130.7	277	171	61.7	1,905	13	6	83	280	1
2012	Purdue	8	120.7	189	108	59.5	1,150	12	8	49	63	2
	Totals	22	125.2	476	283	59.5	3,077	25	14	134	274	3

TerBush has a 10–11 win–loss ratio for his career as the starting quarterback at Purdue.

== Professional career ==
Prior to the 2013 NFL draft, TerBush was projected to be undrafted by NFLDraftScout.com. He was rated as the 44th-best quarterback in the draft. He was not invited to the NFL Scouting Combine, he posted the following numbers during his Purdue pro-day workouts:

Pre-draft measurables
Height	Weight	40-yard dash	10-yard split	20-yard split	20-yard shuttle	Three-cone drill	Vertical jump	Broad jump
6 ft 5 in (1.96 m)	238 lb (108 kg)	4.87 s	1.68 s	2.80 s	4.55 s	7.01 s	27 in (0.69 m)	9 ft 0 in (2.74 m)
All values from 2013 Purdue Pro Day

After going undrafted in the 2013 NFL draft, TerBuh received a tryout with the Pittsburgh Steelers, but failed to make the roster.

On May 13, 2013, TerBush signed with the Arizona Cardinals. On August 25, he was cut by the Cardinals.

== Coaching career ==
TerBush served as the quarterbacks coach at Metamora Township High School from 2017 to 2019.

== Personal life ==
TerBush's major at Purdue University was sociology.
