= Akeem Shavers =

American football player (born 1990)

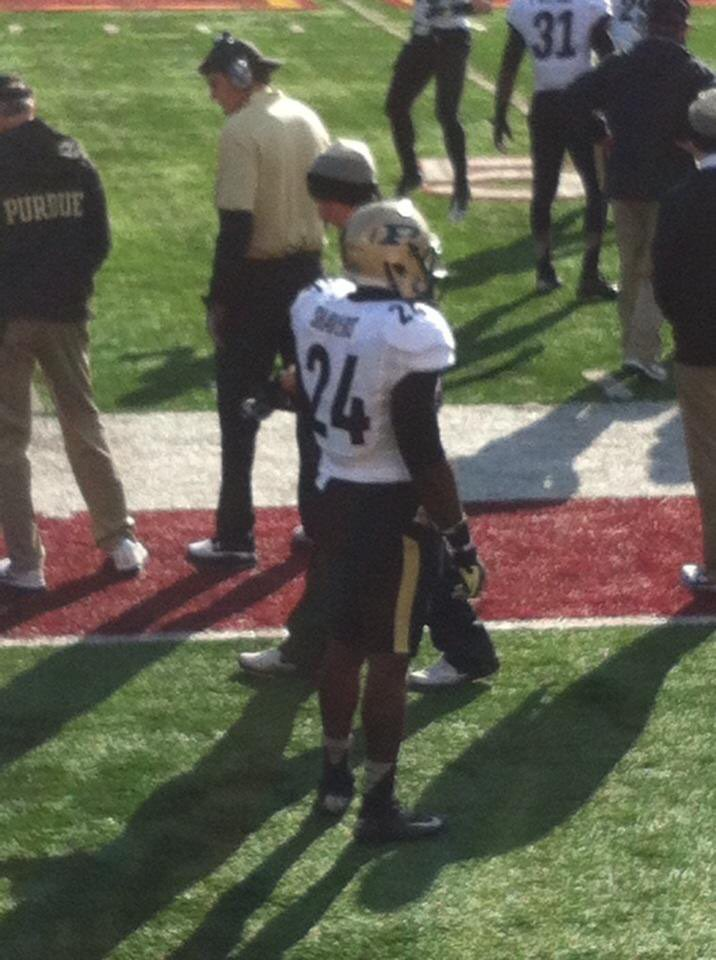
- Shavers during the 2012 season

Profile
- Position: Running back

Personal information
- Born: January 8, 1990 (age 36); Texarkana, Texas, U.S.
- Listed height: 5 ft 11 in (1.80 m)
- Listed weight: 203 lb (92 kg)

Career information
- High school: Redwater (Redwater, Texas)
- College: Purdue
- NFL draft: 2013: undrafted

Career history
- Tampa Bay Buccaneers (2013)*; New England Patriots (2013)*; Ottawa RedBlacks (2015)*; Edmonton Eskimos (2015–2016)
- * Offseason or practice squad member only

Awards and highlights
- Grey Cup champion (2015); 2nd Team Southwest Junior College Football Conference (2010); 2011 Little Caesars Pizza Bowl MVP

Akeem Arta Shavers (born January 8, 1990) is an American former professional football player who was a running back for the Edmonton Eskimos of the Canadian Football League (CFL). He played college football for the Purdue Boilermakers.

== Early life ==
Shavers was born to Catena Shavers and Jamie Duncan. He attended Redwater High School in Redwater, Texas. As a member of the football team, Shavers didn't move to the running back position until he was a senior. He competed in five games amassing 1118 rushing yards and 18 touchdowns before being sidelined with a season ending injury.

== College career ==
=== Independence C.C. ===
After high school, Shavers attended Independence Community College in Independence, Kansas where he played football. Shavers ran for just 235-yards on 64 carries with two touchdowns. With the staff at Independence making changes after the 2008 season, Shavers decided to transfer.

=== Tyler J.C. ===
In 2009, Shavers transferred Tyler Junior College in Tyler, Texas. During the 2009 season at Tyler, Shavers redshirted due to his coach missing the out-of-state/transfer list. With the starting running back spot belonging to Don Brown, Shavers was worked out at defensive back just to get on the field. Shavers played in 6 of the Apaches 8 games during the 2010 season, receiving only 50 carries and 4 touchdowns as the backup running back. Shavers productive season at Tyler netted him 2nd Team All-Conference honors.

College recruiting
Name	Hometown	School	Height	Weight	40^{‡}	Commit date
Akeem Shavers; RB	Texarkana, Texas	Redwater High School	5 ft 11 in (1.80 m)	200 lb (91 kg)	4.5	Dec 6, 2010
Akeem Shavers; RB	Recruit ratings: Scout: Rivals: (NR)					
Overall recruit ranking: Scout: JC (RB) Rivals: – (RB), – (TX) ESPN: – (RB)
Note: In many cases, Scout, Rivals, 247Sports, On3, and ESPN may conflict in their listings of height and weight.; In these cases, the average was taken. ESPN grades are on a 100-point scale.; Sources: "Purdue Football Commitment List". Rivals.; "Purdue College Football Recruiting Commits". Scout.; "ESPN". ESPN.; "Scout.com Team Recruiting Rankings". Scout.; "2011 Team Ranking". Rivals.com.

=== Purdue ===
Shavers committed to Purdue University on December 6, 2010. Shavers was not heavily recruited, and as Purdue was the first FBS scholarship offer he received. Which brought on a stream of offers from other FBS and FCS programs.

=== Statistics ===
		Rushing					Receiving		
Season	Team	Att	Yds	Avg	TD	Long	Rec	Yds	TD
2008	Independence	64	235	3.7	2	n/a	2	13	0
2010	Tyler	50	450	9.0	3	80	2	1	0
	JUCO Totals	114	685	6.0	5	80	4	14	0
2011	Purdue	111	519	4.7	6	44	5	58	1
2012	Purdue	181	871	4.8	6	40	18	370	3
	Purdue Totals	292	1,390	4.8	12	44	23	428	4
	Career totals	406	2,075	5.1	17	80	25	442	4

== Professional career ==
=== Tampa Bay Buccaneers ===
On April 29, 2013, Akeem Shavers was signed as an undrafted free agent by the Tampa Bay Buccaneers. He was released on May 6, 2013.

=== New England Patriots ===
On May 7, Shavers was claimed off waivers by the New England Patriots. And then later released.

=== Edmonton Eskimos ===
Shavers signed with the Edmonton Eskimos of the Canadian Football League (CFL) in early spring of 2015. He spent his first few weeks on the team's practice squad and was later activated as a cornerback where he ultimately made the active roster. Due to injuries in the Edmonton backfield, Shavers was moved back to running back where he was able to contribute to the championship season.
