= Carson Wiggs =

American football player (born 1990)

No. 3
- Position: Placekicker

Personal information
- Born: February 20, 1990 (age 36); Grand Prairie, Texas, U.S.
- Listed height: 6 ft 1 in (1.85 m)
- Listed weight: 222 lb (101 kg)

Career information
- High school: South Grand Prairie
- College: Purdue
- NFL draft: 2012: undrafted

Career history
- Seattle Seahawks (2012−2013)*; Indianapolis Colts (2014)*
- * Offseason or practice squad member only

Awards and highlights
- Second-team All-Big Ten (2011)
- Stats at Pro Football Reference

Carson Michael Wiggs (born February 20, 1990) is an American former college football player who was a placekicker for the Purdue Boilermakers. He was signed by the Seattle Seahawks of the National Football League (NFL) as an undrafted free agent in 2012.

== Early life ==
Wiggs attended South Grand Prairie High School in Grand Prairie, Texas. As a senior, he was invited to participate in the Under Armour All-America Game in January 2008. He was also named honorable mention all-state and first-team all-district as both punter and kicker, after averaging 37 yards per punt and making 8 of 13 field goals, while still maintaining his grades to earn honorable mention academic all-state. Wiggs made 15 of 23 field goals and 67 of 69 PAT attempts for his career.

College recruiting
Name	Hometown	School	Height	Weight	40^{‡}	Commit date
Carson Wiggs; K	Grand Prairie, Texas	South Grand Prairie High School	6 ft 0 in (1.83 m)	180 lb (82 kg)	--	Jun 12, 2007
Carson Wiggs; K	Recruit ratings: Scout: Rivals:					
Overall recruit ranking: Scout: 10 (K) Rivals: 11 (K), -- (TX)
‡ Refers to 40-yard dash; Note: In many cases, Scout, Rivals, 247Sports, On3, and ESPN may conflict in their listings of height, weight and 40 time.; In these cases, the average was taken. ESPN grades are on a 100-point scale.; Sources: "2007 Team Ranking". Rivals.com.

Wiggs committed to Purdue University on June 12, 2007. Wiggs wasn't heavily recruited, as he also had two other FBS scholarship offers from New Mexico State and Louisiana Tech.

== College career ==
=== Statistics ===
		Kicking					Punting		
Season	Team	Made FG	Att FG	Pct	Long	Pts	Att	Avg	Long
2008	Purdue	8	11	72.7	53	43	6	31.2	38
2009	Purdue	14	21	66.7	59	82	4	36.5	51
2010	Purdue	15	19	78.9	52	72	22	36.4	59
2011	Purdue	19	25	76	53	96	23	35	54
	Totals	56	72	77.7	59	293	55	35.2	59

== Professional career ==
=== Seattle Seahawks ===
He was considered as one of the better kicking prospects for the 2012 NFL draft, as he was one of the few kickers selected to participate in the NFL Combine, but he was not selected during the draft. He signed with the Seattle Seahawks as an undrafted free agent. On August 19, 2013, he was cut by the Seahawks.

=== Indianapolis Colts ===
Wiggs signed with the Indianapolis Colts on March 18, 2014.
