= Nick Mondek =

American football player (born 1988)

No. 69
- Position: Offensive tackle

Personal information
- Born: November 3, 1988 (age 38); Naperville, Illinois, U.S.
- Listed height: 6 ft 6 in (1.98 m)
- Listed weight: 304 lb (138 kg)

Career information
- High school: Naperville Central
- College: Purdue
- NFL draft: 2012: 6th round, 195th overall pick

Career history
- Houston Texans (2012)*; Oakland Raiders (2012)*; Houston Texans (2012–2013)*
- * Offseason or practice squad member only
- Stats at Pro Football Reference

Nicholas James Mondek (born November 3, 1988) is an American former football offensive tackle. He was selected in the sixth round, 195th overall, by the Houston Texans in the 2012 NFL draft. He played college football at Purdue. While at Purdue he was recruited by Joe Tiller as a defensive tackle, but when Danny Hope took over the program in 2010, Hope transitioned Mondek into an offensive tackle.

== College career ==
College recruiting
Name	Hometown	School	Height	Weight	40^{‡}	Commit date
Nick Mondek; ATH	Naperville, Illinois	Naperville Central High School	6 ft 6 in (1.98 m)	224 lb (102 kg)	4.72	Nov 17, 2006
Nick Mondek; ATH	Recruit ratings: Scout: Rivals:					
Overall recruit ranking: Scout: -- (DE) Rivals: -- (ATH), 23 (IL)
‡ Refers to 40-yard dash; Note: In many cases, Scout, Rivals, 247Sports, On3, and ESPN may conflict in their listings of height, weight and 40 time.; In these cases, the average was taken. ESPN grades are on a 100-point scale.; Sources: "2007 Team Ranking". Rivals.com.

Mondek committed to Purdue University on November 17, 2006. Mondek was also receiving football scholarships from Central Michigan, Hawaii, Northern Illinois and Vanderbilt
