= Lou Anarumo =

American football coach (born 1966)

Indianapolis Colts
- Title: Defensive coordinator

Personal information
- Born: August 18, 1966 (age 60); New York City, New York, U.S.

Career information
- College: Wagner College

Career history
- Wagner (1989) Running backs coach; Syracuse (1990–1991) Graduate assistant & assistant defensive backs coach; Merchant Marine (1992–1994) Defensive coordinator & defensive backs coach; Harvard (1995–2000) Assistant head coach/defensive backs/special teams; Marshall (2001–2003) Defensive backs coach; Purdue (2004–2011) Defensive backs coach; Miami Dolphins (2012–2017); Defensive backs coach (2012–2017); Interim defensive coordinator (2015); New York Giants (2018) Defensive backs coach; Cincinnati Bengals (2019–2024) Defensive coordinator; Indianapolis Colts (2025–present) Defensive coordinator
- Coaching profile at Pro Football Reference

Lou Anarumo (born August 18, 1966) is an American professional football coach who is the defensive coordinator for the Indianapolis Colts of the National Football League (NFL). He previously served as the defensive backs coach at Purdue under Joe Tiller and Danny Hope from 2004 to 2011, the Miami Dolphins from 2012 to 2017, and the New York Giants in 2018. He was the defensive coordinator of the Cincinnati Bengals from 2019 to 2024.

== Early life ==
Anarumo was born on Staten Island, New York in 1966. He attended Wagner College where he earned his degree in special education. While at Wagner, he served as the junior varsity head coach at Susan E. Wagner High School in Staten Island.

== Coaching career ==
=== Early career ===
Anarumo served as the part-time running backs coach at Wagner in the spring of 1990 before he moved to the U.S. Merchant Marine Academy during the fall of 1990 to serve in the same capacity. From there, Anarumo went to Syracuse University where he served as a graduate assistant under Phil Elmassian working with the defensive backs. Anarumo then returned to the Merchant Marines as the defensive coordinator before being hired at Harvard to serve as the assistant head coach and defensive backs coach. It is at Harvard that Anarumo met former boss Joe Philbin, who at the time served as Harvard's offensive line coach. Anarumo made a stop at Marshall before being hired to replace Elmassian at Purdue.

=== Miami Dolphins ===
In 2012, Anarumo was hired by the Miami Dolphins as their defensive backs coach. On October 8, 2015, he was chosen to be the interim defensive coordinator of the Miami Dolphins to replace Kevin Coyle who was fired the same day. Due to the changes in coaching staff following the 2015–16 season, he was once again made the defensive backs coach under Adam Gase, the new head coach for the 2016–17 season.

=== New York Giants ===
On January 25, 2018, Anarumo was named as defensive backs coach for the New York Giants.

=== Cincinnati Bengals ===
On February 21, 2019, Anarumo was hired by the Cincinnati Bengals as their defensive coordinator under head coach Zac Taylor. He assumed Steve Jackson's cornerbacks coaching duties for the team's Week 11 and Week 12 games in 2020 against the Washington Football Team and New York Giants due to Jackson missing the games for COVID-19 pandemic protocols.

In the 2021–22 AFC Championship Game, Anarumo's defense held the Kansas City Chiefs to just a field goal in the second half and forced an interception in overtime, contributing to a 27–24 OT victory to advance to Super Bowl LVI. In Super Bowl LVI, the Bengals lost 23–20 to the Los Angeles Rams.

During the 2023 offseason, Anarumo was a finalist for the Arizona Cardinals head coaching job that ultimately went to Jonathan Gannon.

Anarumo was let go by the Bengals at the end of the 2024 season.

=== Indianapolis Colts ===
On January 21, 2025, Anarumo was hired as defensive coordinator by the Indianapolis Colts.

In his debut season for the Indianapolis Colts, Anarumo's defensive unit recorded 1,347 tackles, 39 sacks, and 14 interceptions.

== Personal life ==
Anarumo is married, and the couple have three children.
