= Robert Marve =

American gridiron football player (born 1989)

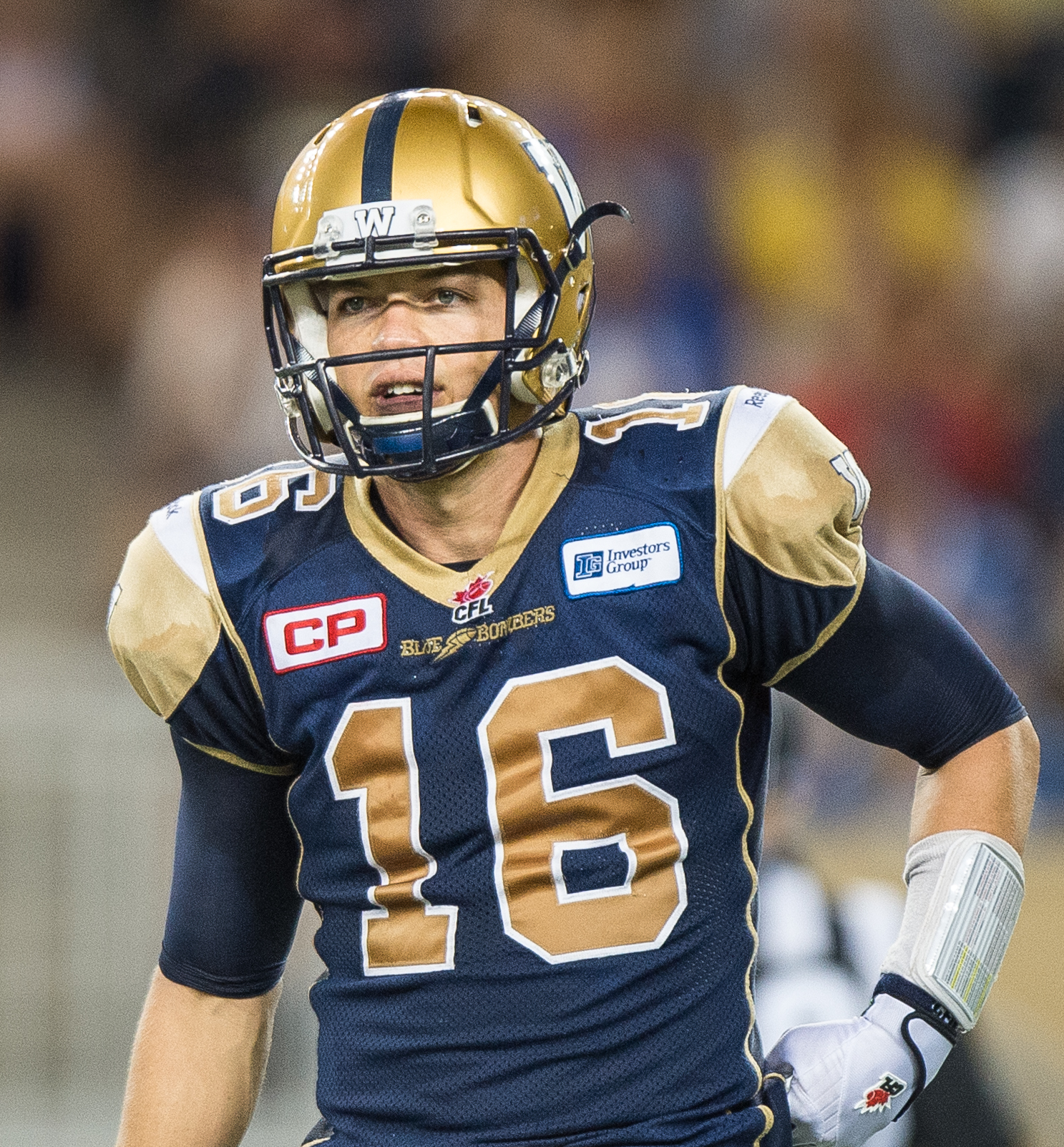
- Marve with the Winnipeg Blue Bombers in 2015

No. 16
- Position: Quarterback

Personal information
- Born: February 10, 1989 (age 37); Tampa, Florida, U.S.
- Listed height: 6 ft 1 in (1.85 m)
- Listed weight: 212 lb (96 kg)

Career information
- High school: Henry B. Plant (Tampa, Florida)
- College: Purdue

Career history
- 2014–2015: Winnipeg Blue Bombers

Awards and highlights
- Florida Mr. Football Award (2006); Parade All-American (2006)

Career statistics
- Comp. / Att.: 45 / 77
- Passing yards: 486
- TD–INT: 2–4
- Rushing touchdowns: 4
- Stats at CFL.ca (archive)

Robert Eugene Marve (born February 10, 1989) is an American former football quarterback. As a high school player, Marve was named Florida's Mr. Football and member of Parade All-American team as senior at Plant High School in Tampa, Florida, after breaking three state season records. Those records included passing yards (4,380), which topped 2007 Heisman Trophy winner Tim Tebow's marks, touchdowns (48) and completions (280). He also led the Panthers to a Class 4A state championship by completing 30 of 46 passes for 305 yards and three touchdowns in the title game.

Marve chose Miami to continue his football career. He was committed to Alabama but when Nick Saban was hired he asked Marve to look elsewhere. He sat out his true freshman season after suffering a broken arm in a car accident over the summer. He became the starter for the 2008 Hurricanes squad, leading them to a 6–5 record before being replaced by Jacory Harris for the final regular season game, and the bowl game. Three days after the bowl game, Marve announced that he would be transferring from Miami, citing that he had decided he, "...couldn't play for coach Shannon". After a dispute about where Marve would be able to transfer to, he decided on Purdue on May 20, 2009.

After his transfer, Marve tore his ACL during summer practice, but did not miss any time, as he had to sit out a year due to NCAA transfer rules. In 2010, Marve won the starting quarterback position and started the first four games of the season, going 2–2 before re-tearing his ACL, ending his season. In 2011, Marve had been named the backup quarterback to Rob Henry. But when Henry went down with an ACL tear of his own a week before the first game, Marve was not ready to become the starter with soreness still in his knee. He sat the first two games of the season, before returning to back up Caleb TerBush the entire season.

Marve was granted a sixth year of eligibility by the NCAA, after missing multiple seasons with injuries. He returned to Purdue, and was named the backup to TerBush once again in 2012. But one day before the Boilermakers' first game, TerBush was suspended and Marve was named the starter. Marve responded with his best game to date as a Boilermaker, throwing for 295 yards and three touchdowns. The following week, TerBush returned as the Boilermakers starter. Marve continued to see action in relief of TerBush, until he tore his ACL yet again. After missing three weeks, Marve returned to his reserve role with the Boilermakers. After TerBush led the Boilermakers to a 2–6 record as a starter, he was benched in favor of Marve. Marve led Purdue to three straight victories to end the regular season, and helped the Boilermakers collect their second consecutive bowl appearance.

After going undrafted in the 2013 NFL draft, Marve played professionally for the Winnipeg Blue Bombers of the Canadian Football League (CFL) from 2014 to 2015.

== Early life ==
Marve is the son of Eugene Marve, a former NFL player. Marve was selected as Florida's Mr. Football and named to the Parade All-American team as senior at Plant High School in Tampa, Florida after breaking three state season records. Those records included, passing yards (4,380), which topped 2007 Heisman Trophy winner Tim Tebow's marks, touchdowns (48) and completions (280). He also led the Panthers to Class 4A state championship by completing 30 of 46 passes for 305 yards and three touchdowns in title game. After originally committing to the University of Alabama following his senior season, Marve changed his commitment to Miami.

College recruiting
Name	Hometown	School	Height	Weight	40^{‡}	Commit date
Robert Marve; QB	Tampa, Florida	Henry B. Plant High School	6 ft 1 in (1.85 m)	189 lb (86 kg)	4.65	Jan 31, 2007
Robert Marve; QB	Recruit ratings: Scout: Rivals:					
Overall recruit ranking: Scout: 10 (QB) Rivals: 8 (QB), 20 (FL)
‡ Refers to 40-yard dash; Note: In many cases, Scout, Rivals, 247Sports, On3, and ESPN may conflict in their listings of height, weight and 40 time.; In these cases, the average was taken. ESPN grades are on a 100-point scale.; Sources: "2007 Team Ranking". Rivals.com.

Marve committed to the University of Miami on January 31, 2007. He chose Miami over offers from Alabama, Hawaii, Maryland, Michigan State, Purdue, and South Florida.

== College career ==
=== Miami ===
==== 2007 season ====
Marve was redshirted by Miami in his true freshman season in 2007 after a summer car accident in which he suffered a broken arm.

==== 2008 season ====
He was 6–5 as a starter during the 2008 season, splitting his playing time with true freshman Jacory Harris. He started every game except the season opener against Charleston Southern, for which he was suspended as the result of Marve's arrest in Coconut Grove when he was charged with two misdemeanors, resisting arrest without violence and criminal mischief, after he punched and broke a car mirror then tried to elude police by running away. Marve finished the 2008 regular season with 9 passing touchdowns and 13 interceptions. He also had 1,293 passing yards on 116 completions on 213 attempts, for a passer rating of 107.19. Miami accepted a bowl bid to play California in the 2008 Emerald Bowl, but Marve did not play in the bowl after being suspended for academic reasons on December 18, 2008.

==== Transfer ====
On December 30, 2008, Marve announced his intention to transfer from Miami; it is believed that he was considering the University of Florida, the University of Tennessee, and Louisiana State University. In response, Miami stipulated that he could not transfer to any school in Florida, the ACC, or the SEC. Marve appealed to the school's athletic appeals committee, and after much negative publicity, Miami lifted part of the transfer limitations to allow him to transfer to any school in the SEC, except the University of Florida, the University of Tennessee, and Louisiana State University. Those three SEC schools were singled out based on beliefs by Miami that individuals representing the Marve family contacted those schools regarding Marve's potential transfer. The in-state ban still stood, however, except for the University of South Florida and the University of Central Florida, to which he was allowed to transfer. In January, Eugene Marve told the Miami Herald that Bob Stoops, head coach of the Oklahoma Sooners, had expressed an interest in Marve's transfer. Eugene also suggested that Marve was considering Oklahoma State University, Purdue University and the University of South Florida. Shortly after Eugene's announcement, Bob Stoops was interviewed by Tulsa World and stated that he had not contacted Robert or his family and had no interest in recruiting Robert Marve. Stoops expressed confusion as to how such a rumor could have started and commented that he was satisfied with the quarterbacks he currently had.

=== Purdue ===
==== 2009 season ====
On May 20, 2009, Marve announced he would transfer to Purdue University. On July 21, 2009, Marve tore his ACL, but was already required to sit out a year due to transfer, so he did not miss any playing time.

==== 2010 season ====
In 2010, it was announced that Marve would be the No. 1 quarterback entering preseason camp. Marve started in the Boilermaker's 2010 opener against Notre Dame and completed 31 of 42 for 220 yards with 2 interceptions, and Purdue lost 23–12. Marve was injured in the second quarter of the Boilermakers' third game of the season, a 24–13 win over Ball State, but returned the following week against Toledo. During the Toledo game, Marve dropped back to pass, and tore his left ACL, ending his season.

==== 2011 season ====
In 2011, Marve was accused of receiving improper benefits while playing at Miami from Nevin Shapiro. Marve admitted to receiving benefits in an agreement with the NCAA, which allowed him to be ruled eligible to play the 2011 season. Marve missed the first two games of the Boilermakers season with his injured knee still not feeling 100%. He returned for the Southeast Missouri State game. Marve returned from his injury and was named TerBush's backup. Marve completed 7 of 8 passes in the game for 91 yards and a touchdown, as the Boilermakers won 59–0. Against Notre Dame, Marve completed 9 of 22 passes for 91 yards. TerBush started the game, but there was also significant playing time for Marve. After the game, Danny Hope had said TerBush had a better command of the offense, and Marve played outside the system when he didn't need to. This sparked Marve to tweet about the situation saying, "Don't understand how I was not playing in the system! It was rough from the get go, don't understand how that was on me." Hope went on to say that he was fine with the way Marve handled the situation, he was just upset at how the fans and media took the comment as negative. The following week against Minnesota, he was again listed as the backup. The Boilermakers won the game 45–17 with TerBush and Marve splitting time again. For the game he completed 4 of 6 passes for 15 yards and a touchdown.

==== 2012 season ====
On January 13, 2012, Marve was granted a sixth year of eligibility by the NCAA due to the high number of injuries he has received throughout his career. Marve entered his senior season looking at splitting playing time once again with TerBush, and now the fully recovered Henry. With TerBush working mostly with the first team, he was expected to start the first game of the year, until it was announced (one hour prior to gametime) that TerBush was suspended and Marve was the starting quarterback. Marve responded by having the best game of his Boilermaker career, throwing for 295 yards and 3 touchdowns, in a 48–6 win over Eastern Kentucky. TerBush returned to his starting role the following week against rival, Notre Dame. TerBush played the entire first quarter for the Boilermakers, but since the Boilermakers were held scoreless, Marve replaced TerBush at quarterback in the second quarter. Marve moved the ball for Purdue, leading them on two scoring drives resulting in 10 points. Marve had Purdue close to scoring again in the 4th quarter, when he was sacked and re-injured his knee. TerBush came in during the drive and threw the game tying score to Antavian Edison. Purdue would lose on the next drive as Notre Dame made a game-winning field goal. A few days after the Notre Dame game, it was made public that Marve had re-torn his ACL, and that he would be sidelined for a few weeks.

=== Statistics ===
Through the 2012 regular season, Marve's statistics are as follows:

		Passing								Rushing
Season	Team	GP	Rating	Att	Comp	Pct	Yds	TD	INT	Att	Yds	TD
2008	Miami	11	107.2	213	116	54.5	1,293	9	13	59	119	2
2010	Purdue	4	113	99	67	67.7	512	3	4	22	−23	1
2011	Purdue	9	107.7	109	61	56	633	4	5	29	51	1
2012	Purdue	9	141.4	219	145	66.2	1,522	13	3	30	−14	0
	Totals	33	119.9	640	389	60.8	3,960	29	25	140	188	4

Marve has a 6–4 win–loss ratio for his career as the starting quarterback at Purdue.

== Professional career ==
Prior to the 2013 NFL draft, Marve was projected to be undrafted by NFLDraftScout.com. He was rated as the 26th-best quarterback in the draft. He was not invited to the NFL Scouting Combine, he posted the following numbers during his Purdue pro-day workouts:

Pre-draft measurables
Height	Weight	40-yard dash	10-yard split	20-yard split	20-yard shuttle	Three-cone drill	Vertical jump	Broad jump	Bench press
6 ft 1 in (1.85 m)	212 lb (96 kg)	4.81 s	1.69 s	2.70 s	4.31 s	7.15 s	27.5 in (0.70 m)	9 ft 5 in (2.87 m)	22 reps
All values from 2013 Purdue Pro Day

After going undrafted in the 2013 NFL draft, Marve attended the Tampa Bay Buccaneers rookie minicamp on a tryout basis.

On March 7, 2014, Marve signed with the Canadian Football League's Winnipeg Blue Bombers. In the 2014 CFL season he appeared in 2 regular season games, completing 11 of 22 pass attempts for 1 touchdown, with 0 interceptions. Marve only played in 3 games during the 2015 season before announcing his retirement mid-season. He completed 34 of 55 passing attempts (61.8%) for 346 yards with 1 touchdown and 4 interceptions; for a passer rating of 55.6.

== Personal life ==
Marve has been accused of several incidents of domestic violence. In 2020, he was placed under house arrest.
