= 2011 Western Michigan Broncos football team =

American college football season

2011 Western Michigan Broncos football

Little Caesars Pizza Bowl, L 32–37 vs. Purdue
- Conference: Mid-American Conference
- West Division
- Record: 7–6 (5–3 MAC)
- Head coach: Bill Cubit (7th season)
- Offensive scheme: Multiple
- Defensive coordinator: Dave Cohen (2nd season)
- Base defense: 3–4
- Home stadium: Waldo Stadium

2011 Mid-American Conference football standings
| | Conf. | | | Overall |
| Team | W | | L | W | | L |
|---|---|---|---|---|---|---|
East Division
| Ohio xy | 6 | – | 2 | 10 | – | 4 |
| Temple | 5 | – | 3 | 9 | – | 4 |
| Kent State | 4 | – | 4 | 5 | – | 7 |
| Bowling Green | 3 | – | 5 | 5 | – | 7 |
| Miami (OH) | 3 | – | 5 | 4 | – | 8 |
| Buffalo | 2 | – | 6 | 3 | – | 9 |
| Akron | 0 | – | 8 | 1 | – | 11 |
West Division
| Northern Illinois xy$ | 7 | – | 1 | 11 | – | 3 |
| Toledo x | 7 | – | 1 | 9 | – | 4 |
| Western Michigan | 5 | – | 3 | 7 | – | 6 |
| Ball State | 4 | – | 4 | 6 | – | 6 |
| Eastern Michigan | 4 | – | 4 | 6 | – | 6 |
| Central Michigan | 2 | – | 6 | 3 | – | 9 |
Championship: Northern Illinois 23, Ohio 20
$ – Conference champion; x – Division champion/co-champions; y – Championship game participant

The 2011 Western Michigan Broncos football team represented Western Michigan University West Division of the Mid-American Conference during the 2011 NCAA Division I FBS football season. Led by seventh-year head coach Bill Cubit, compiling an overall record of 7–6 with mark of 5–3 in conference play, placing third in the MAC West Division. Western Michigan was invited to the Little Caesars Pizza Bowl, where the Broncos lost to Purdue, 37–32. The team played home games at Waldo Stadium in Kalamazoo, Michigan.

== Schedule ==
| Date | Time | Opponent | Site | TV | Result | Attendance | Source |
|---|---|---|---|---|---|---|---|
| September 3 | 3:30 pm | at Michigan* | Michigan Stadium; Ann Arbor, MI | ABC/ESPN2 | L 10–34 | 110,506 | |
| September 10 | 7:00 pm | Nicholls State* | Waldo Stadium; Kalamazoo, MI | | W 38–7 | 19,884 | |
| September 17 | Noon | Central Michigan | Waldo Stadium; Kalamazoo, MI (WMU–CMU Rivalry Trophy, Michigan MAC Trophy) | ESPN Plus | W 44–14 | 26,674 | |
| September 24 | 3:30 pm | at No. 24 Illinois* | Memorial Stadium; Champaign, IL | BTN | L 20–23 | 43,684 | |
| October 1 | 3:30 pm | at Connecticut* | Rentschler Field; East Hartford, CT | SNY | W 38–31 | 36,648 | |
| October 8 | 2:00 pm | Bowling Green^{†} | Waldo Stadium; Kalamazoo, MI | STO | W 45–21 | 20,238 | |
| October 15 | 3:30 pm | at Northern Illinois | Huskie Stadium; DeKalb, IL | CSN Chicago | L 22–51 | 20,277 | |
| October 22 | 1:00 pm | at Eastern Michigan | Rynearson Stadium; Ypsilanti, MI (Michigan MAC Trophy) | | L 10–14 | 6,772 | |
| October 29 | 2:00 pm | Ball State | Waldo Stadium; Kalamazoo, MI | | W 45–35 | 16,548 | |
| November 8 | 8:00 pm | at Toledo | Glass Bowl; Toledo, OH | ESPNU | L 63–66 | 16,107 | |
| November 16 | 8:00 pm | at Miami (OH) | Yager Stadium; Oxford, OH | ESPN2 | W 24–21 | 15,729 | |
| November 25 | 1:00 pm | Akron | Waldo Stadium; Kalamazoo, MI | | W 68–19 | 16,582 | |
| December 27 | 4:30 pm | vs. Purdue* | Ford Field; Detroit, MI (Little Caesars Pizza Bowl) | ESPN | L 32–37 | 46,177 | |
*Non-conference game; ^{†}Homecoming; Rankings from AP Poll released prior to the game; All times are in Eastern time

The Michigan game on September 3 was called after the 3rd quarter due to a lightning storm. By rule, both teams have to agree to end the game, which both teams did and Michigan was awarded the win.

== Awards ==
=== MAC Player of the Week ===
==== Offensive ====
- Jordan White, senior, wide receiver (five awards)
  - Week three: 13 receptions, 177 yards, two touchdowns, 64-yard punt return, 241 all-purpose yards
  - Week four: 14 receptions, 134 yards, one touchdown
  - Week six: 12 receptions, 156 yards
  - Week nine: Nine receptions, 172 yards, two touchdowns
  - Week 11: 16 receptions, 238 yards, three touchdowns
- Alex Carder, junior, quarterback (two awards)
  - Week five: 37 completions, 51 attempts, 479 yards passing (ninth most in MAC history), five touchdowns, zero interceptions
  - Week 11: 548 yards (second-most in conference history), seven passing touchdowns (tied for most in conference history), one rushing touchdown

==== Defensive ====
- Johnnie Simon, sophomore, safety
  - Week nine: 10 tackles, pass break up, two quarterback hurries, interception
- Drew Nowak, senior, defensive line
  - Week twelve: 5 tackles, 2.5 sacks, 2.5 TFL, one fumble recovery

==== Special teams ====
- John Potter, senior, placekicker (three awards)
  - Week two: Five for five point after touchdowns, 40-yard field goal
  - Week three: Five for five point after touchdowns, three field goals, four touchbacks
  - Week 11: Nine for nine point after touchdowns, MAC's record holder for consecutive PATs made in a career
