= Danny Hope =

American football player and coach (born 1959)

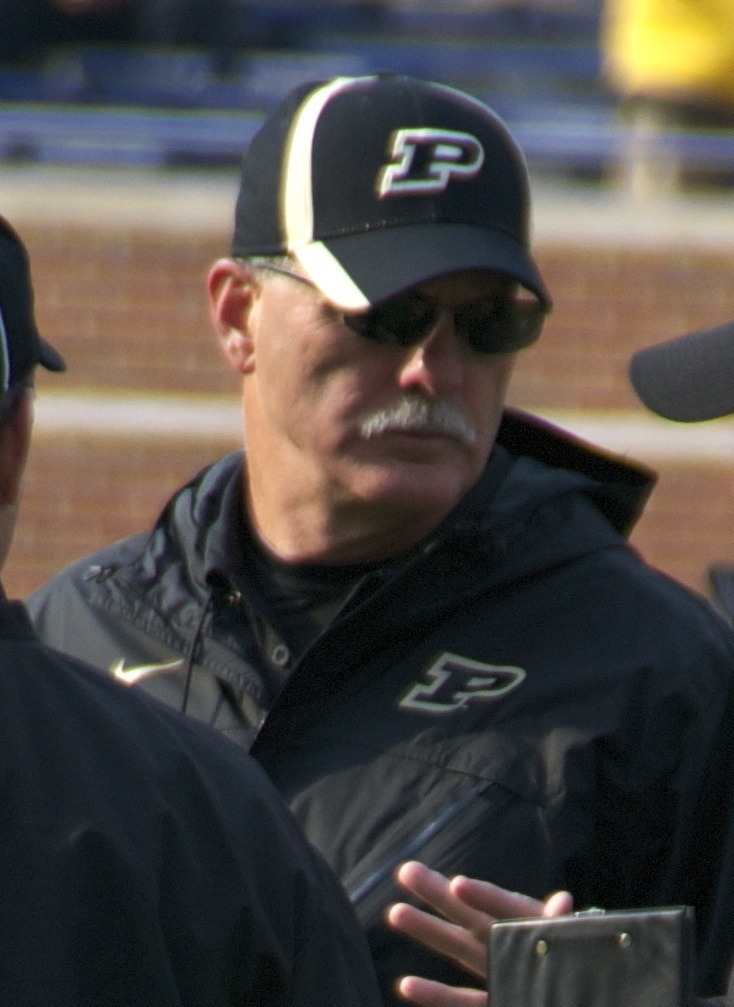
- Hope in 2011

Biographical details
- Born: January 7, 1959 (age 67); Gainesville, Florida, U.S.

Playing career
- 1977–1980: Eastern Kentucky
- Position: Offensive tackle

Coaching career (HC unless noted)
- 1981–1984: Manatee HS (FL) (assistant)
- 1985–1994: Louisville (OL)
- 1995: Oklahoma (OL)
- 1996: Wyoming (OL)
- 1997–2001: Purdue (OL)
- 2002: Louisville (AHC)
- 2003–2007: Eastern Kentucky
- 2008: Purdue (AHC/OL)
- 2009–2012: Purdue
- 2015: South Florida (co-OC/OL)
- 2019: Eastern Kentucky (OL)
- 2025: UCF (co-OL/Interim)

Head coaching record
- Overall: 57–49
- Bowls: 1–0
- Tournaments: 0–1 (NCAA D-I playoffs)

Accomplishments and honors

Championships
- 1 OVC (2007)

Awards
- OVC Coach of the Year (2007)

Charles Daniel Hope (born January 7, 1959) is an American football coach and former player. He served as the head football coach at Eastern Kentucky University from 2003 to 2007, and Purdue University from 2009 to 2012, compiling a career college football head coaching record of 57–49. Following the passing of UCF offensive line coach Shawn Clark in 2025, Hope joined the Knights' coaching staff to assist with responsibilities.

== Coaching career ==
Hope was the head football coach at Eastern Kentucky University from 2003 to 2007. He is a graduate of Eastern Kentucky and also was a player at Eastern Kentucky. Before arriving at Eastern Kentucky, Hope was the offensive coordinator at Louisville. Hope was also an assistant coach in various capacities at Purdue, Wyoming, and Oklahoma prior to becoming the head coach at Eastern Kentucky. He was most recently the co-offensive coordinator and offensive line coach for the South Florida Bulls football team before stepping down after one season for family reasons.

=== Purdue ===
Beginning on approximately January 7, 2008, several media outlets reported that Hope had been offered and accepted a coaching position at Purdue where it was expected that he would replace coach Joe Tiller as part of a succession plan.

During his previous stay at Purdue, Hope was the offensive line coach for Tiller. He is credited with building the offensive line that protected NFL quarterback Drew Brees and produced several NFL offensive linemen, including All-Pro Matt Light.

In his first game as head coach at Purdue in 2009, the Boilermakers won, 52–31, over Toledo. Purdue lost their next five games before upsetting No. 7 Ohio State, 26–18, at home on October 17. Later during the 2009 season, the Boilermakers won at Michigan for the first time since 1966 with a 38–36 come-from-behind win at The Big House on November 7. It was only the third time in program history that Purdue defeated Ohio State and Michigan in the same season.

Hope's teams missed out on bowl games in both the 2009 and 2010 seasons. However, the 2011 team was able to record a 6–6 overall record and a 4–4 conference record, including a second win against Ohio State in three years. The team went to the Little Caesars Pizza Bowl, where they defeated Western Michigan, 37–32, to achieve Hope's first winning season at Purdue. Following the season, Burke extended Hope with a two-year contract extension.

The 2012 season was met with high expectations from fans, alumni, and Hope himself, who proclaimed that it would be his best team with many starters returning. Moreover, with both Ohio State and Penn State serving bowl bans that year, the Boilermakers had a strong opportunity to win the Leaders division title. However, after a 3–1 non-conference start fueled by three wins against lower-tier competition, the team opened Big Ten play with five straight losses. Although the Boilers eventually won their final three games, including victories over archrivals IU and Illinois, and become bowl-eligible for the second straight year, athletic director Morgan Burke announced on November 25, 2012, that Hope would be fired. Wide receivers coach Patrick Higgins was named interim coach for the bowl game.

Hope finished his head coaching career at Purdue with a record of 22–27. Purdue replaced him with Kent State's Darrell Hazell, who posted a record of 9–33.

== Head coaching record ==
Year	Team	Overall	Conference	Standing	Bowl/playoffs
Eastern Kentucky Colonels (Ohio Valley Conference) (2003–2007)
2003	Eastern Kentucky	7–5	6–2	2nd	
2004	Eastern Kentucky	6–5	6–2	T–2nd	
2005	Eastern Kentucky	7–4	7–1	2nd	
2006	Eastern Kentucky	6–5	5–3	T–4th	
2007	Eastern Kentucky	9–3	8–0	1st	L NCAA Division I First Round
Eastern Kentucky:		35–22	32–8		
Purdue Boilermakers (Big Ten Conference) (2009–2012)
2009	Purdue	5–7	4–4	T–6th	
2010	Purdue	4–8	2–6	9th	
2011	Purdue	7–6	4–4	3rd (Leaders)	W Little Caesars Pizza
2012	Purdue	6–6	3–5	4th (Leaders)	Heart of Dallas*
Purdue:		22–27	13–19	* Hope fired before bowl game.	
Total:		57–49			
National championship Conference title Conference division title or championship game berth
