= Albert Evans (American football) =

American football player (born 1989)

No. 32
- Position: Safety

Personal information
- Born: October 16, 1989 (age 37); Gary, Indiana, U.S.
- Listed height: 6 ft 0 in (1.83 m)
- Listed weight: 208 lb (94 kg)

Career information
- High school: Portage (Portage, Indiana)
- College: Purdue
- NFL draft: 2012: undrafted

Career history
- Miami Dolphins (2012)

Albert Tremmell Evans (born October 16, 1989) is an American former football safety. He was signed as an undrafted free agent following the 2012 NFL draft. He played college football at Purdue.

== Early life ==
Evans attended Portage High School in Portage, Indiana While there, Evans participated in football, basketball and track and field. As a member of the football team, Evans played as a running back in high school under head coach Craig Buzea. His junior year, Evans rushed for 1,603 yards and 12 touchdowns. His senior season he rushed for 743 yards on 177 carries (4.2 average), had 18 receptions for 216 yards (12.0 average), while also returning two punts 43 and 57 yards for touchdowns.

College recruiting
Name	Hometown	School	Height	Weight	40^{‡}	Commit date
Albert Evans; RB	Portage, Indiana	Portage High School	6 ft 1 in (1.85 m)	190 lb (86 kg)	4.5	Jul 10, 2007
Albert Evans; RB	Recruit ratings: Scout: Rivals:					
Overall recruit ranking: Scout: 101 (RB) Rivals: -- (RB), 8 (IN)
‡ Refers to 40-yard dash; Note: In many cases, Scout, Rivals, 247Sports, On3, and ESPN may conflict in their listings of height, weight and 40 time.; In these cases, the average was taken. ESPN grades are on a 100-point scale.; Sources: "2008 Team Ranking". Rivals.com.

Evans committed to Purdue University on July 10, 2007. Evans also received scholarship offers from Akron, Cincinnati, Duke, Illinois, Indiana and Northern Illinois.

== Professional career ==
On April 29, 2012, Evans signed as an undrafted free agent with the Miami Dolphins.

Evans has been an active campaigner of the #retire32 movement. As President of #retire32, he has made it known that 32 belongs in the Portage, Purdue, and National Football League Hall of fame.
