= Rick Schmeig =

American football player (born 1990)

No. 78
- Position: Center

Personal information
- Born: April 6, 1990 (age 36)
- Listed height: 6 ft 3 in (1.91 m)
- Listed weight: 305 lb (138 kg)

Career information
- High school: Oak Hills (OH)
- College: Purdue
- NFL draft: 2013: undrafted

Career history
- Indianapolis Colts (2013)*; Northern Kentucky Nightmare (2016)
- * Offseason or practice squad member only

Rick Terry Schmeig is an American former football center. He played college football for the Purdue University. He went undrafted during the 2013 NFL draft, and signed as an undrafted free agent with the Indianapolis Colts.

== Early life ==
Schmeig attended Oak Hills High School in Cincinnati, Ohio, and played for the Oak Hills Highlanders football team.

== College career ==
Schmeig enrolled in the Purdue University, where he played for the Purdue Boilermakers football team from 2009 to 2012.

== Professional career ==
After going undrafted during the 2013 NFL draft, Schmeig signed with the Indianapolis Colts as an undrafted free agent. On August 25, 2013, he was waived by the Colts.

On February 25, 2016, Schmeig signed with the Northern Kentucky Nightmare of American Indoor Football.
