= Touchdown Club of Columbus =

Athletic club in Ohio, USA

Logo of the Touchdown Club of Columbus

The Touchdown Club of Columbus was founded in Columbus, Ohio, in 1956 by Sam B. Nicola at the request of state auditor James A. Rhodes, who later became governor of the state. Nicola served as the club's president until his death in 1993. More than a decade later, his son Sam Nicola Jr. took over the Touchdown Club. On January 22, 2020, the president of the Touchdown Club of Columbus, Curt Boster, announced on the club's Facebook page the cancellation of the awards, citing difficulty of maintaining the event without a title sponsor.

== Awards ==
The Touchdown Club of Columbus gave several awards to recognize outstanding athletes.

=== Sammy Baugh Trophy ===
The Sammy Baugh Trophy was awarded annually to the nation's top collegiate passer. It is named after TCU quarterback Sammy Baugh.

Season	Winner	Team
1959	Dick Norman	Stanford
1960	Hayseed Stephens	Hardin–Simmons
1961	Ron Miller	Wisconsin
1962	Don Trull	Baylor
1963	Don Trull (2)	Baylor
1964	Jerry Rhome	Tulsa
1965	Steve Sloan	Alabama
1966	Bob Griese	Purdue
1967	Terry Hanratty	Notre Dame
1968	Chuck Hixson	SMU
1969	Mike Phipps	Purdue
1970	Pat Sullivan	Auburn
1971	John Reaves	Florida
1972	Don Strock	Virginia Tech
1973	Jesse Freitas Jr.	San Diego State
1974	Gary Sheide	BYU
1975	Gene Swick	Toledo
1976	Tommy Kramer	Rice
1977	Guy Benjamin	Stanford
1978	Steve Dils	Stanford
1979	Marc Wilson	BYU
1980	Mark Herrmann	Purdue
1981	Jim McMahon	BYU
1982	John Elway	Stanford
1983	Steve Young	BYU
1984	Robbie Bosco	BYU
1985	Brian McClure	Bowling Green
1986	Vinny Testaverde	Miami (FL)
1987	Don McPherson	Syracuse
1988	Steve Walsh	Miami (FL)
1989	Jeff George	Illinois
1990	David Klingler	Houston
1991	Ty Detmer	BYU
1992	Elvis Grbac	Michigan
1993	Trent Dilfer	Fresno State
1994	Kerry Collins	Penn State
1995	Danny Wuerffel	Florida
1996	Steve Sarkisian	BYU
1997	Ryan Leaf	Washington State
1998	Daunte Culpepper	UCF
1999	Chad Pennington	Marshall
2000	Chris Weinke	Florida State
2001	David Carr	Fresno State
2002	Kliff Kingsbury	Texas Tech
2003	B. J. Symons	Texas Tech
2004	Stefan LeFors	Louisville
2005	Brady Quinn	Notre Dame
2006	Colt Brennan	Hawaii
2007	Graham Harrell	Texas Tech
2008	Sam Bradford	Oklahoma
2009	Case Keenum	Houston
2010	Landry Jones	Oklahoma
2011	Case Keenum (2)	Houston
2012	Colby Cameron	Louisiana Tech
2013	Derek Carr	Fresno State
2014	Brandon Doughty	Western Kentucky
2015	Matt Johnson	Bowling Green
2016	Patrick Mahomes	Texas Tech
2017	Mason Rudolph	Oklahoma State
2018	Dwayne Haskins	Ohio State

=== Jim Brown Trophy ===
This honor went to the NCAA's top running back, named after Syracuse running back Jim Brown.

Season	Winner	Team
1991	Vaughn Dunbar	Indiana
1992	Marshall Faulk	San Diego State
1993	Brent Moss	Wisconsin
1994	Rashaan Salaam	Colorado
1995	Eddie George	Ohio State
1996	Troy Davis	Iowa State
1997	Ricky Williams	Texas
1998	Ricky Williams (2)	Texas
1999	Ron Dayne	Wisconsin
2000	LaDainian Tomlinson	TCU
2001	Luke Staley	BYU
2002	Larry Johnson	Penn State
2003	Chris Perry	Michigan
2004	Adrian Peterson	Oklahoma
2005	Reggie Bush	USC
2006	Darren McFadden	Arkansas
2007	Darren McFadden (2)	Arkansas
2008	Shonn Greene	Iowa
2009	Toby Gerhart	Stanford
2010	LaMichael James	Oregon
2011	Montee Ball	Wisconsin
2012	Montee Ball (2)	Wisconsin
2013	Andre Williams	Boston College
2014	Melvin Gordon	Wisconsin
2015	Dalvin Cook	Florida State
2016	Donnel Pumphrey	San Diego State
2017	Bryce Love	Stanford
2018	Darrell Henderson	Memphis

=== Paul Warfield Trophy ===
Named after Ohio State wide receiver Paul Warfield, this honor was given to the nation's top collegiate wide receiver.

Season	Winner	Team
1991	Desmond Howard	Michigan
1992	O. J. McDuffie	Penn State
1993	David Palmer	Alabama
1994	Michael Westbrook	Colorado
1995	Keyshawn Johnson	USC
1996	Marcus Harris	Wyoming
1997	Randy Moss	Marshall
1998	Troy Edwards	Louisiana Tech
1999	Peter Warrick	Florida State
2000	Santana Moss	Miami (FL)
2001	Jabar Gaffney	Florida
2002	Charles Rogers	Michigan State
2003	Larry Fitzgerald	Pittsburgh
2004	Braylon Edwards	Michigan
2005	Dwayne Jarrett	USC
2006	Calvin Johnson	Georgia Tech
2007	Michael Crabtree	Texas Tech
2008	Michael Crabtree (2)	Texas Tech
2009	Jordan Shipley	Texas
2010	Justin Blackmon	Oklahoma State
2011	Justin Blackmon (2)	Oklahoma State
2012	Marqise Lee	USC
2013	Davante Adams	Fresno State
2014	Amari Cooper	Alabama
2015	Roger Lewis	Bowling Green
2016	Corey Davis	Western Michigan
2017	Anthony Miller	Memphis
2018	Rondale Moore	Purdue

=== Jim Parker Trophy ===
Given yearly to the top collegiate offensive lineman. Named after Ohio State guard Jim Parker.

Season	Winner	Pos.	Team
1991	Greg Skrepenak	OT	Michigan
1992	Lincoln Kennedy	OT	Washington
1993	Aaron Taylor	OT	Notre Dame
1994	Zach Wiegert	OT	Nebraska
1995	Jonathan Ogden	OT	UCLA
1996	Orlando Pace	OT	Ohio State
1997	Aaron Taylor	G	Nebraska
1998	Matt Stinchcomb	OT	Georgia
1999	Chris McIntosh	OT	Wisconsin
2000	Steve Hutchinson	G	Michigan
2001	Bryant McKinnie	OT	Miami (FL)
2002	Brett Romberg	C	Miami (FL)
2003	Shawn Andrews	OT	Arkansas
2004	Jammal Brown	OT	Oklahoma
2005	Greg Eslinger	C	Minnesota
2006	Joe Thomas	OT	Wisconsin
2007	Jake Long	OT	Michigan
2008	Andre Smith	OT	Alabama
2009	Russell Okung	OT	Oklahoma State
2010	Gabe Carimi	OT	Wisconsin
2011	Barrett Jones	C	Alabama
2012	Luke Joeckel	OT	Texas A&M
2013	Cyril Richardson	OT	Baylor
2014	Reese Dismukes	C	Auburn
2015	Landon Turner	G	North Carolina
2016	Pat Elflein	C	Ohio State
2017	Billy Price	C	Ohio State
2018	Jonah Williams	OT	Alabama

=== Bill Willis Trophy ===
Named after Ohio State middle guard Bill Willis, this award was given yearly to the top collegiate defensive lineman.

Season	Winner	Pos.	Team
1991	Steve Emtman	DT	Washington
1992	Micheal Barrow	DE	Miami (FL)
1993	Dan Wilkinson	DT	Ohio State
1994	Warren Sapp	DT	Miami (FL)
1995	Tedy Bruschi	DE	Arizona
1996	Grant Wistrom	DE	Nebraska
1997	Andre Wadsworth	DE	Florida State
1998	Tom Burke	DE	Wisconsin
1999	Corey Moore	DE	Virginia Tech
2000	Jamal Reynolds	DE	Florida State
2001	Julius Peppers	DE	North Carolina
2002	Terrell Suggs	DE	Arizona State
2003	Tommie Harris	DT	Oklahoma
2004	Erasmus James	DE	Wisconsin
2005	Elvis Dumervil	DE	Louisville
2006	Quinn Pitcock	DT	Ohio State
2007	George Selvie	DE	South Florida
2008	Brian Orakpo	DE	Texas
2009	Ndamukong Suh	DT	Nebraska
2010	Ryan Kerrigan	DE	Purdue
2011	Whitney Mercilus	DE	Illinois
2012	John Simon	DE	Ohio State
2013	Aaron Donald	DT	Pittsburgh
2014	Joey Bosa	DE	Ohio State
2015	Myles Garrett	DE	Texas A&M
2016	Ed Oliver	DT	Houston
2017	Christian Wilkins	DT	Clemson
2018	Quinnen Williams	DT	Alabama

=== Jack Lambert Trophy ===
Named after Kent State linebacker Jack Lambert, this award was given yearly to the top collegiate linebacker.

Season	Winner	Team
1991	Erick Anderson	Michigan
1992	Marvin Jones	Florida State
1993	Trev Alberts	Nebraska
1994	Derrick Brooks	Florida State
1994	Dana Howard	Illinois
1995	Simeon Rice	Illinois
1996	Pat Fitzgerald	Northwestern
1997	Andy Katzenmoyer	Ohio State
1998	Dat Nguyen	Texas A&M
1999	LaVar Arrington	Penn State
2000	Dan Morgan	Miami (FL)
2001	Rocky Calmus	Oklahoma
2002	E. J. Henderson	Maryland
2003	Jonathan Vilma	Miami (FL)
2004	Derrick Johnson	Texas
2005	A. J. Hawk	Ohio State
2006	Patrick Willis	Ole Miss
2007	James Laurinaitis	Ohio State
2008	James Laurinaitis (2)	Ohio State
2009	Rolando McClain	Alabama
2010	Von Miller	Texas A&M
2011	Luke Kuechly	Boston College
2012	Jarvis Jones	Georgia
2013	Khalil Mack	Buffalo
2014	Scooby Wright	Arizona
2015	Joe Schobert	Wisconsin
2016	Ben Boulware	Clemson
2017	Josey Jewell	Iowa
2018	Josh Allen	Kentucky

=== Jack Tatum Trophy ===
Starting in 1991, the Jack Tatum Trophy was given yearly to the top collegiate defensive back. It is named after the legendary Ohio State safety Jack Tatum.

Season	Winner	Pos.	Team
1991	Terrell Buckley	CB	Florida State
1992	Deon Figures	CB	Colorado
1993	Antonio Langham	CB	Alabama
1994	Bobby Taylor	CB	Notre Dame
1995	Lawyer Milloy	S	Washington
1996	Chris Canty	CB	Kansas State
1997	Charles Woodson	CB	Michigan
1998	Antoine Winfield	CB	Ohio State
1999	Tyrone Carter	S	Minnesota
2000	Jamar Fletcher	CB	Wisconsin
2001	Roy Williams	S	Oklahoma
2002	Mike Doss	S	Ohio State
2003	Sean Taylor	S	Miami (FL)
2004	Antrel Rolle	CB	Miami (FL)
2005	Jimmy Williams	CB	Virginia Tech
2006	Reggie Nelson	S	Florida
2007	Aqib Talib	CB	Kansas
2008	Eric Berry	S	Tennessee
2009	Eric Berry (2)	S	Tennessee
2010	Patrick Peterson	CB	LSU
2011	David Amerson	CB	NC State
2012	Ed Reynolds	S	Stanford
2013	Darqueze Dennard	CB	Michigan State
2014	Gerod Holliman	S	Louisville
2015	Desmond King	CB	Iowa
2016	Tarvarus McFadden	S	Florida State
2017	Josh Jackson	CB	Iowa
2018	Grant Delpit	S	LSU

=== Archie Griffin Award ===
The Archie Griffin Award was given to college football's most valuable player for the entire season. It was named after the only two-time Heisman Trophy winner, Ohio State running back Archie Griffin.

Season	Winner	Pos.	Team
1999	Michael Vick	QB	Virginia Tech
2000	Josh Heupel	QB	Oklahoma
2001	Ken Dorsey	QB	Miami (FL)
2002	Ken Dorsey (2)	QB	Miami (FL)
2003	Matt Leinart	QB	USC
2004	Matt Leinart (2)	QB	USC
2005	Vince Young	QB	Texas
2006	Troy Smith	QB	Ohio State
2007	Pat White	QB	West Virginia
2008	Colt McCoy	QB	Texas
2009	Toby Gerhart	RB	Stanford
2010	Andrew Luck	QB	Stanford
2011	Montee Ball	RB	Wisconsin
2012	Johnny Manziel	QB	Texas A&M
2013	Jameis Winston	QB	Florida State
2014	Marcus Mariota	QB	Oregon
2015	Deshaun Watson	QB	Clemson
2016	Sam Darnold	QB	USC
2017	McKenzie Milton	QB	UCF
2018	Trevor Lawrence	QB	Clemson

=== Chic Harley Award ===
Named after Ohio State halfback Chic Harley, this award was presented to the College Football Player of the Year.

Season	Winner	Pos.	Team
1955	Howard Cassady	HB	Ohio State
1956	Paul Hornung	QB	Notre Dame
1957	John David Crow	HB	Texas A&M
1958	Billy Cannon	HB	LSU
1959	Billy Cannon (2)	HB	LSU
1960	Joe Bellino	HB	Navy
1961	Ernie Davis	HB	Syracuse
1962	Terry Baker	QB	Oregon State
1963	Roger Staubach	QB	Navy
1964	Bob Timberlake	QB	Michigan
1965	Mike Garrett	RB	USC
1966	Steve Spurrier	QB	Florida
1967	Gary Beban	QB	UCLA
1968	O. J. Simpson	RB	USC
1969	Steve Owens	RB	Oklahoma
1970	Jim Plunkett	QB	Stanford
1971	Pat Sullivan	QB	Auburn
1972	Johnny Rodgers	WR	Nebraska
1973	John Cappelletti	RB	Penn State
1974	Archie Griffin	RB	Ohio State
1975	Archie Griffin (2)	RB	Ohio State
1976	Tony Dorsett	RB	Pittsburgh
1977	Earl Campbell	RB	Texas
1978	Billy Sims	RB	Oklahoma
1979	Charles White	RB	USC
1980	George Rogers	RB	South Carolina
1981	Marcus Allen	RB	USC
1982	Herschel Walker	RB	Georgia
1983	Mike Rozier	RB	Nebraska
1984	Doug Flutie	QB	Boston College
1985	Bo Jackson	RB	Auburn
1986	Jim Harbaugh	QB	Michigan
1987	Chris Spielman	LB	Ohio State
1988	Barry Sanders	RB	Oklahoma State
1989	Anthony Thompson	RB	Indiana
1990	Greg Lewis	RB	Washington
1991	Desmond Howard	WR	Michigan
1992	Gino Torretta	QB	Miami (FL)
1993	Charlie Ward	QB	Florida State
1994	Rashaan Salaam	RB	Colorado
1995	Eddie George	RB	Ohio State
1996	Troy Davis	RB	Iowa State
1997	Charles Woodson	CB	Michigan
1998	Ricky Williams	RB	Texas
1999	Ron Dayne	RB	Wisconsin
2000	Josh Heupel	QB	Oklahoma
2001	Ken Dorsey	QB	Miami (FL)
2002	Ken Dorsey (2)	QB	Miami (FL)
2003	Larry Fitzgerald	WR	Pittsburgh
2004	Reggie Bush	RB	USC
2005	Reggie Bush (2)	RB	USC
2006	Troy Smith	QB	Ohio State
2007	Tim Tebow	QB	Florida
2008	Sam Bradford	QB	Oklahoma
2009	Colt McCoy	QB	Texas
2010	Cam Newton	QB	Auburn
2011	Robert Griffin III	QB	Baylor
2012	Johnny Manziel	QB	Texas A&M
2013	Jordan Lynch	QB	Northern Illinois
2014	Marcus Mariota	QB	Oregon
2015	Christian McCaffrey	RB	Stanford
2016	Deshaun Watson	QB	Clemson
2017	Baker Mayfield	QB	Oklahoma
2018	Dwayne Haskins	QB	Ohio State

=== Kellen Moore Award ===
Previously called the Quarterback of the Year Award, this accolade differed from the Sammy Baugh Trophy in that it went to the top quarterback, rather than the top passer. Its name was changed to its current identity in 2012, honoring two-time winner Kellen Moore, who became the FBS all-time leader in wins by a quarterback after going 50–3 as the starter for the Boise State Broncos.

Season	Winner	Team
1991	Casey Weldon	Florida State
1992	Rick Mirer	Notre Dame
1993	Charlie Ward	Florida State
1994	Kerry Collins	Penn State
1995	Tommie Frazier	Nebraska
1996	Danny Wuerffel	Florida
1997	Peyton Manning	Tennessee
1998	Tim Couch	Kentucky
1999	Joe Hamilton	Georgia Tech
2000	Josh Heupel	Oklahoma
2001	Ken Dorsey	Miami (FL)
2002	Ken Dorsey (2)	Miami (FL)
2003	Jason White	Oklahoma
2004	Matt Leinart	USC
2005	Matt Leinart (2)	USC
2006	Troy Smith	Ohio State
2007	Tim Tebow	Florida
2008	Sam Bradford	Oklahoma
2009	Colt McCoy	Texas
2010	Kellen Moore	Boise State
2011	Kellen Moore (2)	Boise State
Award renamed
2012	Collin Klein	Kansas State
2013	A. J. McCarron	Alabama
2014	Trevone Boykin	TCU
2015	Baker Mayfield	Oklahoma
2016	Baker Mayfield (2)	Oklahoma
2017	J. T. Barrett	Ohio State
2018	Dwayne Haskins	Ohio State

=== Ozzie Newsome Award ===
Named after Alabama tight end Ozzie Newsome, this award was presented annually to the top collegiate tight end.

Season	Winner	Team
2006	Matt Spaeth	Minnesota
2007	Travis Beckum	Wisconsin
2008	Jermaine Gresham	Oklahoma
2009	Aaron Hernandez	Florida
2010	Michael Egnew	Missouri
2011	Tyler Eifert	Notre Dame
2012	Zach Ertz	Stanford
2013	Jace Amaro	Texas Tech
2014	Nick O'Leary	Florida State
2015	Jake Butt	Michigan
2016	Evan Engram	Ole Miss
2017	Mark Andrews	Oklahoma
2018	T. J. Hockenson	Iowa

=== Woody Hayes Trophy ===
Named after long-time Ohio State head football coach Woody Hayes, this award recognized the top collegiate coach.

Season	Winner	Team
1977	Lou Holtz	Arkansas
1978	Joe Paterno	Penn State
1979	Earle Bruce	Ohio State
1980	Vince Dooley	Georgia
1981	Danny Ford	Clemson
1982	Joe Paterno (2)	Penn State
1983	Tom Osborne	Nebraska
1984	Don James	Washington
1985	Bo Schembechler	Michigan
1986	Joe Paterno (3)	Penn State
1987	Dick MacPherson	Syracuse
1988	Lou Holtz (2)	Notre Dame
1989	Not awarded	
1990	Bobby Ross	Georgia Tech
1991	Don James (2)	Washington
1992	Dennis Erickson	Miami (FL)
1993	Don Nehlen	West Virginia
1994	Tom Osborne (2)	Nebraska
1995	Gary Barnett	Northwestern
1996	Bruce Snyder	Arizona State
1997	Lloyd Carr	Michigan
1998	Phillip Fulmer	Tennessee
1999	Frank Beamer	Virginia Tech
2000	Bob Stoops	Oklahoma
2001	Ralph Friedgen	Maryland
2002	Jim Tressel	Ohio State
2003	Bob Stoops (2)	Oklahoma
2004	Urban Meyer	Utah
2005	Joe Paterno (4)	Penn State
2006	Jim Tressel (2)	Ohio State
2007	Mark Mangino	Kansas
2008	Mike Leach	Texas Tech
2009	Gary Patterson	TCU
2010	Jim Harbaugh	Stanford
2011	Bill Snyder	Kansas State
2012	Urban Meyer (2)	Ohio State
2013	Gus Malzahn	Auburn
2014	Gary Patterson (2)	TCU
2015	Kirk Ferentz	Iowa
2016	James Franklin	Penn State
2017	Scott Frost	UCF
2018	Dabo Swinney	Clemson

=== Zuppke Award ===
Named after Illinois head coach Robert Zuppke, the Zuppke Award trophy was given to the Touchdown Club of Columbus's selection for national champion college football team.

Season	Winner team	Ref.
1957	Ohio State Buckeyes	
1988	Notre Dame Fighting Irish	
2017	UCF Knights	

=== Freshman of the Year ===
This award was given yearly to the top college football newcomer.

Season	Winner	Pos.	Team
2001	Anthony Davis	RB	Wisconsin
2002	Maurice Clarett	RB	Ohio State
2003	Chris Leak	QB	Florida
2004	Adrian Peterson	RB	Oklahoma
2005	Tyrell Sutton	RB	Northwestern
2006	Colt McCoy	QB	Texas
2007	Michael Crabtree	WR	Texas Tech
2008	Julio Jones	WR	Alabama
2009	Dion Lewis	RB	Pittsburgh
2010	Marcus Lattimore	RB	South Carolina
2011	Sammy Watkins	WR	Clemson
2012	Todd Gurley	RB	Georgia
2013	Christian Hackenberg	QB	Penn State
2014	Samaje Perine	RB	Oklahoma
2015	Tanner Mangum	QB	BYU
2016	Jalen Hurts	QB	Alabama
2017	J. K. Dobbins	RB	Ohio State
2018	Trevor Lawrence	QB	Clemson

=== Vlade Award ===
Named in honor of Vlade Janakievski, one of the most accurate placekickers in Ohio State football history, this award was given yearly to the most accurate college football placekicker.

Season	Winner	Team
2010	Alex Henery	Nebraska
2011	Brett Maher	Nebraska
2012	Jeremy Shelley	Alabama
2013	Roberto Aguayo	Florida State
2014	Roberto Aguayo (2)	Florida State
2015	Aidan Schneider	Oregon
2016	Tyler Davis	Penn State
2017	Matt Gay	Utah
2018	Andre Szmyt	Syracuse

=== Paul Brown Trophy ===
Named after founder/head coach of both the Cleveland Browns and the Cincinnati Bengals Paul Brown, this trophy was presented annually to the NFL Coach of the Year.

Season	Winner	Team
1971	George Allen	Washington Redskins
1972	Don Shula	Miami Dolphins
1973	Not awarded	
1974	Not awarded	
1975	Not awarded	
1976	Not awarded	
1977	Red Miller	Denver Broncos
1978	Dick Vermeil	Philadelphia Eagles
1979	Chuck Noll	Pittsburgh Steelers
1980	Leeman Bennett	Atlanta Falcons
1981	Sam Rutigliano	Cleveland Browns
1982	Forrest Gregg	Cincinnati Bengals
1983	Joe Gibbs	Washington Redskins
1984	Not awarded	
1985	Mike Ditka	Chicago Bears
1986	Marty Schottenheimer	Cleveland Browns
1987	Tom Landry	Dallas Cowboys
1988	Marv Levy	Buffalo Bills
1989	Bill Walsh	San Francisco 49ers
1990	Lindy Infante	Green Bay Packers
1991	Wayne Fontes	Detroit Lions
1992	Bill Cowher	Pittsburgh Steelers
1993	Dan Reeves	New York Giants
1994	Bill Parcells	New England Patriots
1995	Dom Capers	Carolina Panthers
1996	Mike Shanahan	Denver Broncos
1997	Marty Schottenheimer (2)	Kansas City Chiefs
1998	Dan Reeves (2)	Atlanta Falcons
1999	Dick Vermeil (2)	St. Louis Rams
2000	Jim Haslett	New Orleans Saints
2001	Dick Jauron	Chicago Bears
2002	Andy Reid	Philadelphia Eagles
2003	Bill Belichick	New England Patriots

=== Joe F. Carr Trophy ===
Named after National Football League (NFL) commissioner Joseph Carr, this trophy was presented annually (from 1955 to 1981) to the NFL Player of the Year. During a three-year span (1967–1969), there were an award for both the NFL and the American Football League (AFL).

Season	Winner	Pos.	Team
1955	Fred Morrison	HB	Cleveland Browns
1956	Rick Casares	FB	Chicago Bears
1957	Johnny Unitas	QB	Baltimore Colts
1958	Jim Brown	FB	Cleveland Browns
1959	Johnny Unitas (2)	QB	Baltimore Colts
1960	Norm Van Brocklin	QB	Philadelphia Eagles
1961	Paul Hornung	HB	Green Bay Packers
1962	Jim Taylor	FB	Green Bay Packers
1963	Y. A. Tittle	QB	New York Giants
1964	Johnny Unitas (3)	QB	Baltimore Colts
1965	Jim Brown (2)	FB	Cleveland Browns
1966	Bart Starr	QB	Green Bay Packers
1967	Johnny Unitas (4)	QB	Baltimore Colts (NFL)
1967	Daryle Lamonica	QB	Oakland Raiders (AFL)
1968	Leroy Kelly	RB	Cleveland Browns (NFL)
1968	Lance Alworth	WR	San Diego Chargers (AFL)
1969	Roman Gabriel	QB	Los Angeles Rams (NFL)
1969	Daryle Lamonica (2)	QB	Oakland Raiders
1970	George Blanda	QB/K	Oakland Raiders
1971	Bob Griese	QB	Miami Dolphins
1972	Larry Brown	RB	Washington Redskins
1973	O. J. Simpson	RB	Buffalo Bills
1974	Ken Stabler	QB	Oakland Raiders
1975	O. J. Simpson (2)	RB	Buffalo Bills
1976	Roger Staubach	QB	Dallas Cowboys
1977	Walter Payton	RB	Chicago Bears
1978	Earl Campbell	RB	Houston Oilers
1979	Dan Fouts	QB	San Diego Chargers
1980	Brian Sipe	QB	Cleveland Browns
1981	Ken Anderson	QB	Cincinnati Bengals

=== Sam B. Nicola Trophy ===
Named for the club's founder, this trophy was presented annually to the National High School Player of the Year.

Year	Winner	Team
1981	Kevin Willhite	Cordova (CA) Lancers
1982	Robert Banks	Hampton (VA) Crabbers
1983	Chris Spielman	Massillon (OH) Tigers
1984	Ned Bolcar	Phillipsburg (NJ) Stateliners
1985	Jeff George	Warren Central (IN) Warriors
1986	Emmitt Smith	Escambia (FL) Gators
1987	Todd Marinovich	Capistrano Valley (CA) Cougars
1988	Alonzo Spellman	Rancocas Valley (NJ) Red Devils
1989	Robert Smith	Euclid (OH) Panthers
1990	Marquette Smith	Lake Howell (FL) Silver Hawks
1991	Chris Walsh	Ygnacio Valley (CA) Wolves
1992	Ron Powlus	Berwick (PA) Bulldogs
1993	Lamont Green	Miami Southridge (FL) Spartans
1994	Dan Kendra	Bethlehem Catholic (PA) Golden Hawks
1995	Andy Katzenmoyer	Westerville South (OH) Wildcats
1996	Grant Irons	The Woodlands (TX) Highlanders
1997	Ronald Curry	Hampton (VA) Crabbers
1998	Mike Doss	McKinley (OH) Bulldogs
1999	D. J. Williams	De La Salle (CA) Spartans
2000	Joe Mauer	Cretin-Derham Hall (MN) Raiders
2001	Maurice Clarett	Warren G. Harding (OH) Raiders
2002	Chris Leak	Independence (NC) Patriots
2003	Ted Ginn Jr.	Glenville (OH) Tarblooders
2004	Ryan Perrilloux	East St. John (LA) Wildcats
2005	Brady Quinn	Dublin Coffman (OH) Shamrocks
2006	Myron Rolle	Hun (NJ) Raiders
2007	Jimmy Clausen	Oaks Christian (CA) Lions
2008	Terrelle Pryor	Jeannette (PA) Jayhawks
2009	Lamarcus Joyner	St. Thomas Aquinas (FL) Raiders
2010	Malcom Brown	Brenham (TX) Cubs
2011	Johnathan Gray	Aledo (TX) Bearcats
2012	Max Browne	Skyline (WA) Spartans
2012	Vernon Hargreaves	Wharton (FL) Wildcats
2013	Elijah Hood	Charlotte Catholic (NC) Cougars
2014	Josh Rosen	St. John Bosco (CA) Braves
2015	Jacob Eason	Lake Stevens (WA) Vikings
2016	Alex Huston	Glendale (MO) Falcons
2017	Zamir White	Scotland (NC) Fighting Scots
2018	Ryan Hilinski	Orange Lutheran (CA) Lancers

=== James A. Rhodes Trophy ===
The James A. Rhodes Trophy was awarded annually to the Ohio High School player of the year. It was named for former Governor of Ohio James A. Rhodes, who was state auditor when he made the suggestion that led to the founding of the Touchdown Club of Columbus.

- 1969 – Steve Mauger, Massillon
- 1970 – Ted McNulty, Upper Arlington
- 1971 – Rick Middleton, Delaware Hayes
- 1972 – Archie Griffin, Eastmoor
- 1973 – Mike Gayles, Cincinnati Princeton
- 1974 – Ted Bell, Youngstown Mooney
- 1975 – John Ziepler, Warren Harding
- 1976 – Joe Portale, St Edward
- 1977 – Tim Koegel, Cincinnati Moeller
- 1978 – Art Schlichter, Miami Trace
- 1979 – Ken Roundtree, Cincinnati Moeller
- 1980 – Eric Ellington, Cincinnati Moeller
- 1981 – Mark Brooks, Cincinnati Moeller
- 1982 – Tony Grant, Fremont Ross
- 1983 – Hiawatha Francisco, Cincinnati Moeller
- 1984 – Chris Spielman, Massillon
- 1985 – Mark Kamphous, Cincinnati Moeller
- 1986 – Jeff Davidson, Westerville North
- 1987 – Carlos Snow, Cincinnati Academy
- 1988 – Ronald Howe, Zanesville
- 1989 – Roger Harper, Columbus Independence
- 1990 – Robert Smith, Euclid
- 1991 – Korey Stringer, Warren Harding
- 1992 – Mike Vrabel, Walsh Jesuit
- 1993 – Dee Miller, Springfield
- 1994 – Charles Woodson, Fremont Ross
- 1995 – Andy Katzenmoyer, Westerville South
- 1996 – Derek Combs, Grove City
- 1997 – Tony Fisher, Euclid
- 1998 – Mike Doss, Canton McKinley
- 1999 – Brandon Childress, Cleveland Chanel
- 2000 – Jeff Backes, Upper Arlington
- 2000 – Maurice Hall, Columbus Brookhaven
- 2001 – Justin Zwick, Massillon Washington
- 2001 – Maurice Clarett, Warren Harding
- 2002 – Donte Whitner, Cleveland Glenville
- 2003 – Ted Ginn Jr., Cleveland Glenville
- 2004 – Jamario O'Neal, Cleveland Glenville
- 2005 – Chris Wells, Akron Garfield
- 2006 – Brandon Saine, Piqua
- 2007 – Jake Stoneburner, Dublin Coffman
- 2008 – Zach Boren, Pickerington Central
- 2009 – Braxton Miller, Huber Heights Wayne
- 2010 – Braxton Miller, Huber Heights Wayne
- 2011 – Maty Mauk, Kenton
- 2012 – Mitch Trubisky, Mentor
- 2013 – Grant Sherman, Kenton
- 2014 – Joe Burrow, Athens
- 2015
- 2016 – Daniel Bangura, Harvest Prep
- 2017 – Isaiah Bowser, Sidney
- 2018 – Mark Waid, Girard

=== Male Athlete of the Year ===
- 2007 – Dalton Carriker, Little League World Series
- 2008 – Myron Rolle, Florida State football
- 2009 – Jake Coffman, Northern Illinois
- 2010 – Owen Marecic, Stanford football
- 2011 – Chandler Harnish, Northern Illinois football
- 2012 – Johnny Manziel, Texas A&M football
- 2013 – Keenan Reynolds, Navy football
- 2014 – Logan Stieber, Ohio State wrestling
- 2015 – Reggie Owens, South Carolina State
- 2016 – Andrew Beckwith, Coastal Carolina baseball
- 2017 – Shaquem Griffin, UCF football
- 2018 – Antwan Dixon, Kent State football

=== Female Athlete of the Year ===
- 2007 – Courtney Kupets, Georgia
- 2008 – Angela Tincher, Virginia Tech
- 2009 – Megan Hodge, Penn State volleyball
- 2010 – Katie Spotz, adventurer
- 2011 – None
- 2012 – Kayla Harrison, judo (Olympic gold medalist)
- 2013 – Micha Hancock, Penn State
- 2014 – Lauren Hill, Mount St. Joseph basketball
- 2015 – Margo Geer, Arizona
- 2016 – None
- 2017 – Sabrina Anderson, Slippery Rock
- 2018 – Sidney Peters

=== President's Award ===
- 2011 – Jordan White, Western Michigan University
- 2011 – Ross Franklin, Johnstown High School
- 2012 – Zac Dysert, Miami University
- 2013 – Ryan Switzer, North Carolina
- 2013 – Cartel Brooks, Heidelberg College
- 2014 – Cardale Jones, Ohio State University
- 2015 – Kody Kasey, Georgetown College
- 2016 – Joshua Dobbs, Tennessee
- 2018 – Jeff Monken, Army West Point

=== TDC Lifetime Achievement Award ===
The Touchdown Club also gave the annual TDC Lifetime Achievement Award to a selected athlete.

- 1991 – Olga Korbut, Olympic Gymnastics
- 1992 – Nadia Comăneci, Olympic Gymnastics
- 1993 – Evander Holyfield, Boxing
- 1994 – Jerry Lucas, Basketball Hall of Fame
- 1995 – Sparky Anderson, Baseball Hall of Fame
- 1996 – Bobby Hull, Hockey Hall of Fame
- 1997 – Jim Brown, Football Hall of Fame
- 1998 – George Steinbrenner, New York Yankees
- 1999
- 2000 – Lamar Hunt, American Football League
- 2001
- 2002
- 2003 – Hopalong Cassady, College Football Hall of Fame
- 2004 – Joe Nuxhall, Baseball
- 2005
- 2006 – John Havlicek, Basketball Hall of Fame
- 2006 – Bevo Francis, Basketball
- 2007
- 2008 – Chuck Ealey, Football
- 2009 – Archie Griffin, College Football Hall of Fame
- 2010 – Coach Chris Ault, College Football Hall of Fame
- 2011 – Coach Chuck Kyle, Football
- 2012 – Coach Tom Osborne, College Football Hall of Fame
- 2013
- 2014
- 2015 – Coach Don Donoher, Football
- 2016 – Peter Hanson, Ohio State volleyball
- 2017 – Larry Kehres, Mount Union football
- 2018 – Katie Smith, Naismith and Women's Basketball Halls of Fame

=== FCS Player of the Year ===
Season	Winner	Pos.	Team
2011	Timothy Flanders	RB	Sam Houston State
2012	Taylor Heinicke	QB	Old Dominion
2013	Terrance West	RB	Towson
2014	Marshaun Coprich	RB	Illinois State
2015	Eli Jenkins	QB	Jacksonville State
2016	Gage Gubrud	QB	Eastern Washington
2017	Jeremiah Briscoe	QB	Sam Houston State
2018	Devlin Hodges	QB	Samford

== See also ==
- Bert Bell Award
- Maxwell Football Club
- Washington D.C. Touchdown Club
- Kansas City Committee of 101 Awards
- National Football League Most Valuable Player Award
- NFL Defensive Player of the Year Award
- NFL Offensive Player of the Year Award
- UPI AFL-AFC Player of the Year
- UPI NFC Player of the Year
