= 2012 Ohio State Buckeyes football team =

American college football season

2012 Ohio State Buckeyes football

Big Ten Leaders Division champion
- Conference: Big Ten Conference
- Leaders Division

Ranking
- AP: No. 3
- Record: 12–0 (8–0 Big Ten)
- Head coach: Urban Meyer (1st season)
- Offensive coordinator: Tom Herman (1st season)
- Co-offensive coordinator: Ed Warinner (1st season)
- Offensive scheme: Spread
- Co-defensive coordinators: Luke Fickell (7th season); Everett Withers (1st season)
- Base defense: Multiple
- Captain: 5: John Simon; Zach Boren; Etienne Sabino; Garrett Goebel; Jordan Hall
- Home stadium: Ohio Stadium

2012 Big Ten Conference football standings
	Conf.			Overall
Team	W		L	W		L
Legends Division
No. 25 Nebraska xy	7	–	1	10	–	4
No. 24 Michigan	6	–	2	8	–	5
No. 17 Northwestern	5	–	3	10	–	3
Michigan State	3	–	5	7	–	6
Iowa	2	–	6	4	–	8
Minnesota	2	–	6	6	–	7
Leaders Division
No. 3 Ohio State* x	8	–	0	12	–	0
Penn State*	6	–	2	8	–	4
Wisconsin y$	4	–	4	8	–	6
Purdue	3	–	5	6	–	7
Indiana	2	–	6	4	–	8
Illinois	0	–	8	2	–	10
Championship: Wisconsin 70, Nebraska 31
$ – BCS representative as conference champion; x – Division champion/co-champions; * Ohio State and Penn State ineligible for conference championship game and post-season bowl games due to NCAA sanctions.; Rankings from AP Poll

The 2012 Ohio State Buckeyes football team represented Ohio State University in the 2012 NCAA Division I FBS football season. It was the Buckeye's 123rd season overall, the 100th as a member of the Big Ten Conference and the second as a members of the Big Ten Leaders Division. The team was led by head coach Urban Meyer in his return to coaching after retiring from Florida in 2010 due to health concerns. The Buckeyes played their home games at Ohio Stadium in Columbus, Ohio. The Buckeyes finished the season undefeated with 12 wins (12–0 overall, 8–0 in the Big Ten), Big Ten Leaders Division champions and ranked third in the AP Poll. Due to findings of an investigation conducted by the NCAA during the previous season, Ohio State was ineligible for both the Big Ten Championship Game and an appearance in a bowl game for the 2012 season.

Following their first losing season since 1988, the Buckeyes hired Urban Meyer, who won two national championships with the Florida Gators, as the head coach in November 2011. Meyer and his staff brought in a top five recruiting class while returning 20 starters and starting quarterback Braxton Miller for spring and fall camp. Ohio State entered the season ranked in the middle of the Big Ten, with many expecting a transition season for Meyer and the players. The Buckeyes opened the season with blowout victories against Miami (Ohio) and UCF. Ohio State would defeat Michigan State 17–16 and Nebraska 63–38, games they lost in 2011, to move to 6–0 on the season. The Buckeyes would hold in overtime games against Purdue and Wisconsin later in the season, winning eleven straight. The Buckeyes capped off their undefeated season with a 26–21 victory over arch rival Michigan, denying the Wolverines a share of the Legends Division title.

At the end of the season, several players were recognized with postseason awards for individual accomplishments. Braxton Miller was named the Big Ten offensive player of the year, while John Simon was named the Big Ten defensive player of the year. Also, three players were named to the AP All-American Team, including Johnathan Hankins, Bradley Roby, and John Simon.

== Before the season ==
=== Spring practice ===
Spring Game

Team	1	2	3	4	Total
Gray	0	7	7	0	14
• Scarlet	7	6	0	7	20

- Date: April 21
- Location: Ohio Stadium
  Columbus, OH
- Game start: 1:30 p.m.
- Game attendance: 81,112

Scoring summary
1	7:43	Scarlet	Carlos Hyde 1-yard run (Drew Basil kick)	Scarlet 7–0
2	9:47	Scarlet	Drew Basil 41-yard field goal	Scarlet 10–0
2	0:37	Gray	Devin Smith 28-yard pass from Ken Guiton (Drew Basil kick)	Scarlet 10–7
2	0:06	Scarlet	Drew Basil 32-yard field goal	Scarlet 13–7
3	0:08	Gray	Ken Guiton 4-yard run (Drew Basil kick)	Gray 14–13
4	5:29	Scarlet	Rod Smith 7-yard run (Drew Basil kick)	Scarlet 20–14

Ohio State opened their spring practice on March 29 for the first time under the direction of Urban Meyer. At the opening of practice John Simon, Johnathan Hankins, Garrett Goebel and Adam Bellamy started on the defensive line with Travis Howard and Bradley Roby starting at cornerback. Christian Bryant and C.J. Barnett were the starting safeties on opening day. The running back position rotated between Jordan Hall, Carlos Hyde, Rod Smith and Bri'onte Dunn with Braxton Miller starting at quarterback.

The annual spring game for the Ohio State Buckeyes was held on April 21 at Ohio Stadium on a rainy afternoon in Columbus, Ohio. Urban Meyer began the afternoon with a 1-on-1 circle drill held at midfield before the start of the game. At the conclusion of drill the Buckeyes took the field and split into two teams, a Scarlet and Gray team. Starting quarterback Braxton Miller started for the Scarlet team with backup Kenny Guiton starting for the Gray team. The first touchdown came from the Scarlet team in the first quarter with a run yard touchdown run from Carlos Hyde. Starting kicker Drew Basil kicked a 41-yard field goal at the beginning of the second quarter to extend the Scarlet lead to 10–0. The Gray team got on the board with a 28-yard touchdown pass from Guiton, but a second field goal from Basil would allow the Scarlet to enter the locker room at halftime with a 13–7 lead over the Gray. During the third quarter the Gray team would take a 14–13 lead over the Scarlet team on a four-yard touchdown run from Guiton. However, under Miller, the Scarlet team would drive down and score a touchdown on a Rod Smith run, giving them a 20–13 lead and eventually the victory.

During the game, quarterback Braxton Miller completed 24 of 31 passes for 258 yards with wide receiver Michael Thomas catching 12 passes for a total of 131 yards during the game. The game gave fans a glimpse of Meyer's new spread offense that the Buckeyes will adopt during the season. Linebacker Ryan Shazier led the team with eight tackles. Running back Jordan Hall did not play during the game due to health and precautionary reasons and starting lineman John Simon did not play for a long period during the game.

=== Fall camp ===
Nine separate Ohio State players were on the preseason award watch list in twelve different award categories. These included Johnathan Hankins and John Simon for the Bednarik Award; Corey Brown for the Biletnikoff Award; Etienne Sabino for the Butkus Award; Drew Basil for the Lou Groza Award; Jake Stoneburner for the Lombardi Award; and Braxton Miller for the Maxwell Award. Prior to fall camp, both Stoneburner and Jack Mewhort were suspended from the team indefinitely following their arrests, while senior linebacker Storm Klein was dismissed from the team for his arrest. Klein was later reinstated by head coach Urban Meyer, while still serving a two-game suspension. Ohio State opened their fall camp on August 3 with all players reporting.

== Personnel ==
=== Coaching staff ===
Urban Meyer accepted the head coaching job at Ohio State in November 2011 after coaching at Bowling Green, Utah and Florida, where he won two national championships. Meyer retained only three coaches from the previous years staff, including former interim head coach Luke Fickell and defensive line coach Mike Vrabel. Meyer brought in Tom Herman and Ed Warinner to replace Jim Bollman as offensive coordinator, while Everett Withers and Fickell replaced Jim Heacock as defensive coordinator. Meyer also brought over strength and conditioning coach Mickey Marotti from his staff at Florida.

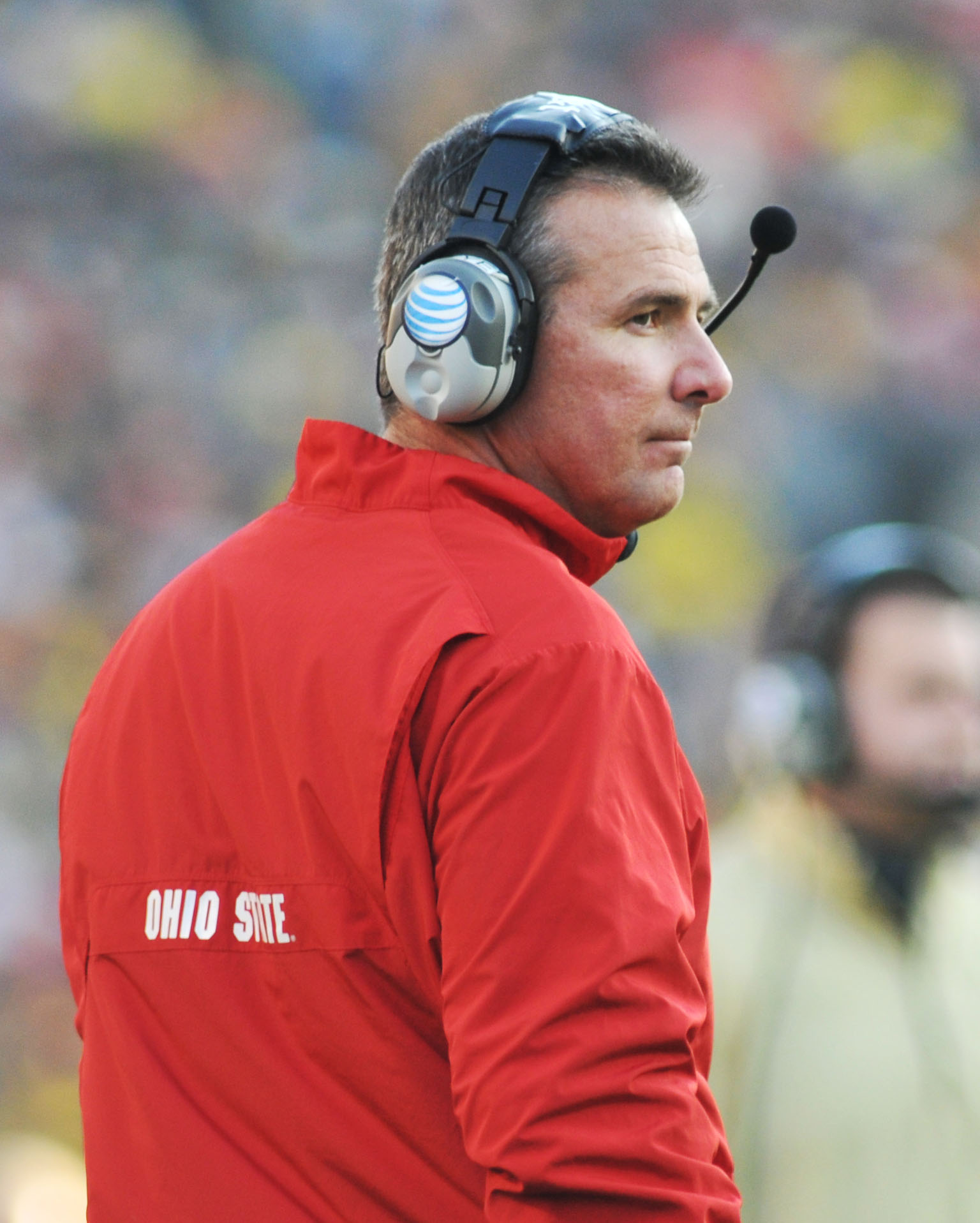
Urban Meyer was in his first year as Ohio State's head coach during the 2012 season.

Name	Position	Seasons at Ohio State	Alma mater
Urban Meyer	Head coach	1st	Cincinnati (1986)
Tom Herman	Offensive coordinator, Quarterbacks	1st	California Lutheran (1997)
Ed Warinner	Co-Offensive Coordinator, Offensive Line	1st	Mount Union (1984)
Luke Fickell	Co-Defensive Coordinator, Linebackers	11th	Ohio State (1997)
Everett Withers	Assistant Head Coach, Co-Defensive coordinator, Safeties	1st	Appalachian State (1985)
Stan Drayton	Running Backs	2nd	Allegheny College (1993)
Zack Smith	Wide Receivers	1st	Florida (2007)
Mike Vrabel	Defensive Line	2nd	Ohio State (1996)
Tim Hinton	Tight Ends, Fullbacks	1st	Wilmington (1982)
Kerry Coombs	Cornerbacks	1st	Dayton (1983)
Parker Fleming	Graduate Assistant	1st	Presbyterian (2010)
Mickey Marotti	Assistant Athletic Director for Football Sports Performance	1st	West Liberty (1987)

=== Departing players ===
Following the 2011 season, four Ohio State players were selected in the 2012 NFL draft. Mike Adams was selected in the second round, DeVier Posey in the third, with Daniel Herron and Nate Ebner selected in the sixth. Other key players to depart due to graduation included Joe Bauserman, Michael Brewster and J.B. Shugarts on offense and Dionte Allen, Tyler Moeller, Andrew Sweat, and Solomon Thomas on defense. Transfers out before the 2012 season included Jamaal Berry who transferred to Murray State, Jeremy Cash who transferred to Duke, Jordan Whiting who transferred to Louisville and Kenny Hayes who transferred to Michigan State. DerJuan Gambrell and Dominic Clarke were both released from the scholarships in January following a violation of team rules.

=== Returning starters ===
Ohio State has 20 returning starts from the 2011 season, including nine on offense and defense, as well as two on special teams. Quarterback Braxton Miller started in eight games during the 2011 season and will return to lead the Buckeyes in 2012.

==== Offense ====
Player	Class	Position
Braxton Miller	Sophomore	Quarterback
Zach Boren	Senior	Fullback
Jordan Hall	Senior	Running Back
Chris Fields	Junior	Wide Receiver
Corey Brown	Junior	Wide Receiver
Jake Stoneburner	Senior	Wide Receiver
Andrew Norwell	Junior	Tackle
Marcus Hall	Junior	Guard
Jack Mewhort	Junior	Guard

==== Defense ====
Player	Class	Position
John Simon	Senior	Lineman
Johnathan Hankins	Junior	Tackle
Garrett Goebel	Senior	Tackle
Nathan Williams	Senior	Defensive End
Etienne Sabino	Senior	Linebacker
Travis Howard	Senior	Cornerback
Bradley Roby	Sophomore	Cornerback
C.J. Barnett	Junior	Safety
Christian Bryant	Junior	Safety

==== Special teams ====
Player	Class	Position
Drew Basil	Junior	Kicker
Ben Buchanan	Senior	Punter

=== Roster ===
2012 Ohio State Buckeyes roster
Quarterbacks: 5 Braxton Miller – sophomore; 12 Cardale Jones – freshman; 13 Kenny Guiton – junior; 17 Justin Siems – senior; 19 Levi Ratliff – freshman; Running backs: 2 Rod Smith – sophomore; 7 Jordan Hall – senior; 25 Bri'onte Dunn – freshman; 28 Warren Ball – freshman; 30 Mark Salano – freshman; 32 Darryl Wood – sophomore; 34 Carlos Hyde – junior; 44 Zach Boren – senior; 49 Adam Homan – senior; Wide receivers: 8 Ricguan Southward – freshman; 9 Verlon Reed – sophomore; 10 Corey Brown – junior; 15 Devin Smith – sophomore; 16 Evan Spencer – sophomore; 18 Tyrone Williams – sophomore; 29 Taylor Rice – senior; 33 Frank Epitropoulos – freshman; 80 Chris Fields – junior; 83 Michael Thomas – freshman; 85 Frank Kangah – freshman; 87 Peter Gwilym – freshman; 88 Stacey Blount – sophomore; Tight ends: 11 Jake Stoneburner – senior; 81 Nick Vannett – freshman; 82 Ryan Carter – freshman; 86 Jeff Heuerman – sophomore; 89 Blake Thomas – freshman	Offensive line: 50 Jacoby Boren – freshman; 55 Tommy Brown – freshman; 57 Chase Farris – freshman; 60 Joey O'Connor – freshman; 62 Logan Beougher – freshman; 64 Ivon Blackman – junior; 65 Pat Elflein – freshman; 66 Kyle Dodson – freshman; 67 Ben St. John – sophomore; 68 Taylor Decker – freshman; 69 Eric Kramer – sophomore; 70 Tim Trummer – freshman; 71 Corey Linsley – junior; 73 Antonio Underwood – sophomore; 74 Jack Mewhort – junior; 76 Darryl Baldwin – sophomore; 77 Reid Fragel – senior; 78 Andrew Norwell – junior; 79 Marcus Hall – junior; Defensive line: 8 Noah Spence – freshman; 43 Nathan Williams – senior; 50 J.T. Moore – sophomore; 52 Johnathan Hankins – junior; 53 Garrett Goebel – senior; 54 John Simon – senior; 56 Dalton Britt – senior; 63 Michael Bennett – sophomore; 72 Chris Carter – freshman; 88 Steve Miller – sophomore; 90 Tommy Schutt – freshman; 91 William McCary – senior; 92 Adolphus Washington – freshman; 94 Rashad Frazier – sophomore; 95 Se'von Pittman – freshman; 96 Kharim Stephens – senior; 97 John Holman – sophomore; 97 Cladius Mbemba – freshman	Linebackers: 5 Camren Williams – freshman; 6 Etienne Sabino – senior; 10 Ryan Shazier – sophomore; 14 Curtis Grant – sophomore; 15 Joshua Perry – freshman; 20 Ross Oltorik – senior; 25 David Perkins – freshman; 32 Storm Klein – senior; 34 Jamal Marcus – freshman; 36 Connor Corwell – freshman; 38 Craig Fada – freshman; 42 Luke Roberts – freshman; 43 Nathan Williams – senior; 48 Joe Burger – freshman; 59 Stewart Smith – senior; Defensive backs: 1 Bradley Roby – sophomore; 2 Christian Bryant – junior; 3 Corey Brown – junior; 4 C.J. Barnett – junior; 7 Travis Howard – senior; 12 Doran Grant – sophomore; 16 Zach Domicone – senior; 18 Najee Murray – freshman; 19 Orhian Johnson – senior; 21 Jamie Wood – junior; 23 Tyvis Powell – freshman; 28 Ron Tanner – freshman; 30 Devan Bogard – freshman; 33 Nik Sarac – freshman; 35 Vincent Patrella – senior	Punters: 17 Ben Buchanan – senior; Kickers: 20 Russell Doup – sophomore; 24 Drew Basil – junior; 26 Kevin Niehoff – freshman; 39 Kyle Clinton – sophomore; Long snappers: 41 Bryce Haynes – freshman; 56 George Makridis – junior
Sources: 2012 Ohio State Buckeyes football roster

=== Depth chart ===
Starters and backups.

Defense

FS
Christian Bryant
Orhian Johnson

WLB	MLB	SLB
Ryan Shazier	Zach Boren	Etienne Sabino
David Perkins	Storm Klein	Josh Perry

SS
C.J. Barnett
Corey Brown

CB
Travis Howard
Adam Griffin

DE	DT	DT	DE
Nathan Williams	Johnathan Hankins	Garrett Goebel	John Simon
Noah Spence	Adolphus Washington	Tommy Schutt	Mike Bennett

CB
Bradley Roby
Doran Grant

Offense

WR
Corey Brown
Evan Spencer

WR
Jake Stoneburner
Chris Fields

LT	LG	C	RG	RT
Jack Mewhort	Andrew Norwell	Corey Linsley	Marcus Hall	Reid Fragel
Darryl Baldwin	Antonio Underwood	Jacoby Boren	Chase Farris	Taylor Decker

WR
Nick Vannett (TE)
Jeff Heuerman (TE)

WR
Devin Smith
Michael Thomas

QB
Braxton Miller
Kenny Guiton

RB
Carlos Hyde
Rod Smith

Special teams
PK Drew Basil
PK Kyle Clinton
P Ben Buchanan
P Drew Basil
KR Devin Smith
Bri'onte Dunn
PR Corey Brown
Devin Smith
LS Bryce Haynes
George Makridis
H Kenny Guiton
Ben Buchanan

=== Recruiting class ===
Ohio State's 2012 recruiting class was ranked third by Scout, fourth by Rivals and sixth by ESPN. Prior to Urban Meyer being named the head coach of the team 13 player were committed to the Buckeyes, with an additional 12 signing after Meyer's hiring. On National Signing Day, 25 players total were signed to the class. The Ohio State class included five players from the ESPN 150: defensive ends Noah Spence, Adolphus Washington and Se'Von Pittman, offensive guard Joey O'Connor and defensive tackle Tommy Schutt.

College recruiting (2012)
Name	Hometown	School	Height	Weight	40^{‡}	Commit date
Jacoby Boren; OG	Pickerington, OH	Pickerington Central	6 ft 3 in (1.91 m)	273 lb (124 kg)	4.7	Dec 3, 2010
Jacoby Boren; OG	Recruit ratings: Scout: Rivals: ESPN:					
Bri'onte Dunn; RB	Canton, OH	Glenoak	6 ft 2 in (1.88 m)	215 lb (98 kg)	4.59	Apr 26, 2011
Bri'onte Dunn; RB	Recruit ratings: Scout: Rivals: ESPN:					
Joshua Perry; OLB	Galena, OH	Olentangy	6 ft 4 in (1.93 m)	228 lb (103 kg)	–	Jun 29, 2010
Joshua Perry; OLB	Recruit ratings: Scout: Rivals: ESPN:					
Tyvis Powell; CB	Bedford, OH	Bedford	6 ft 4 in (1.93 m)	185 lb (84 kg)	–	Jun 1, 2011
Tyvis Powell; CB	Recruit ratings: Scout: Rivals: ESPN:					
Michael Thomas; WR	Woodland Hills, CA	William Howard Taft, 2010 (Fork Union Military Academy, 2011)	6 ft 4 in (1.93 m)	203 lb (92 kg)	–	Oct 28, 2011
Michael Thomas; WR	Recruit ratings: Scout: Rivals: ESPN:					
Cardale Jones; QB	Cleveland, OH	Glenville, 2010 (Fork Union Military Academy, 2011)	6 ft 5 in (1.96 m)	217 lb (98 kg)	–	Jun 29, 2010
Cardale Jones; QB	Recruit ratings: Scout: Rivals: ESPN:					
Warren Ball; RB	Columbus, OH	St. Francis DeSales	6 ft 2 in (1.88 m)	200 lb (91 kg)	-	Sep 1, 2010
Warren Ball; RB	Recruit ratings: Scout: Rivals: ESPN:					
De'van Bogard; S	Cleveland, OH	Glenville	6 ft 1 in (1.85 m)	190 lb (86 kg)	-	Jun 25, 2011
De'van Bogard; S	Recruit ratings: Scout: Rivals: ESPN:					
Taylor Decker; OT	Vandalia, OH	Butler	6 ft 8 in (2.03 m)	313 lb (142 kg)	–	Jan 15, 2012
Taylor Decker; OT	Recruit ratings: Scout: Rivals: ESPN:					
Patrick Elflein; OG	Pickerington, OH	Pickerington North	6 ft 4 in (1.93 m)	285 lb (129 kg)	–	Jul 14, 2011
Patrick Elflein; OG	Recruit ratings: Scout: Rivals: ESPN:					
Frank Epitropoulos; WR	Upper Arlington, OH	Upper Arlington	6 ft 3 in (1.91 m)	195 lb (88 kg)	4.47	Apr 26, 2011
Frank Epitropoulos; WR	Recruit ratings: Scout: Rivals: ESPN:					
Jamal Marcus; OLB	Durham, NC	Hillside	6 ft 2 in (1.88 m)	230 lb (100 kg)	4.6	Feb 1, 2012
Jamal Marcus; OLB	Recruit ratings: Scout: Rivals: ESPN:					
Najee Murray; S	Steubenville, OH	Steubenville	5 ft 11 in (1.80 m)	172 lb (78 kg)	4.41	Jun 12, 2011
Najee Murray; S	Recruit ratings: Scout: Rivals: ESPN:					
Joey O'Connor; OT	Windsor, CO	Windsor	6 ft 4 in (1.93 m)	295 lb (134 kg)	-	Jan 17, 2012
Joey O'Connor; OT	Recruit ratings: Scout: Rivals: ESPN:					
David Perkins; OLB	South Bend, IN	Washington	6 ft 2 in (1.88 m)	225 lb (102 kg)	4.43	Jan 18, 2012
David Perkins; OLB	Recruit ratings: Scout: Rivals: ESPN:					
Se'Von Pittman; DE	Canton, OH	McKinley	6 ft 5 in (1.96 m)	245 lb (111 kg)	-	Dec 12, 2011
Se'Von Pittman; DE	Recruit ratings: Scout: Rivals: ESPN:					
Armani Reeves; CB	West Roxbury, MA	Catholic Memorial	5 ft 9 in (1.75 m)	185 lb (84 kg)	4.41	Jan 29, 2012
Armani Reeves; CB	Recruit ratings: Scout: Rivals: ESPN:					
Camren Williams; MLB	West Roxbury, MA	Catholic Memorial	6 ft 2 in (1.88 m)	215 lb (98 kg)	-	Jan 20, 2012
Camren Williams; MLB	Recruit ratings: Scout: Rivals: ESPN:					
Luke Roberts; MLB	Lancaster, OH	Lancaster	6 ft 2 in (1.88 m)	230 lb (100 kg)	4.62	Dec 9, 2011
Luke Roberts; MLB	Recruit ratings: Scout: Rivals: ESPN:					
Tommy Schutt; DT	Glen Ellyn, IL	Glenbard West	6 ft 3 in (1.91 m)	301 lb (137 kg)	-	Dec 12, 2011
Tommy Schutt; DT	Recruit ratings: Scout: Rivals: ESPN:					
Ricquan Southward; WR	Lakeland, FL	Lakeland	6 ft 2 in (1.88 m)	190 lb (86 kg)	4.41	Nov 27, 2011
Ricquan Southward; WR	Recruit ratings: Scout: Rivals: ESPN:					
Noah Spence; DE	Harrisburg, PA	Bishop McDevitt	6 ft 4 in (1.93 m)	245 lb (111 kg)	-	Dec 18, 2011
Noah Spence; DE	Recruit ratings: Scout: Rivals: ESPN:					
Blake Thomas; TE	Westlake, OH	St. Ignatius	6 ft 4 in (1.93 m)	240 lb (110 kg)	4.8	May 16, 2011
Blake Thomas; TE	Recruit ratings: Scout: Rivals: ESPN:					
Adolphus Washington; DE	Cincinnati, OH	Taft	6 ft 4 in (1.93 m)	230 lb (100 kg)	-	Nov 22, 2011
Adolphus Washington; DE	Recruit ratings: Scout: Rivals: ESPN:					
Kyle Dodson; OT	University Heights, OH	Cleveland Heights	6 ft 6 in (1.98 m)	315 lb (143 kg)	-	Feb 1, 2012
Kyle Dodson; OT	Recruit ratings: Scout: Rivals: ESPN:					
Overall recruit ranking: Scout: 3 Rivals: 4 ESPN: 6
Note: In many cases, Scout, Rivals, 247Sports, On3, and ESPN may conflict in their listings of height and weight.; In these cases, the average was taken. ESPN grades are on a 100-point scale.; Sources: "Ohio State Football Commitments". Rivals.; "2012 Ohio State Football Commits". Scout.; "Scout.com Team Recruiting Rankings". Scout.; "2012 Team Ranking". Rivals.com.

== Schedule ==
The Big Ten Conference released the schedules for the 2011 and 2012 season on September 1, 2010, which were revised after the addition of Nebraska to the conference. As during the 2011 season, the Big Ten continued their scheduling alignment for the 2012 season. As a result, Ohio State played all five Leaders Division opponents: Illinois, Indiana, Penn State, Purdue and Wisconsin. Ohio State also faced three Legends Division opponents: Michigan State, Nebraska and Michigan, the permanent cross-division opponent. Ohio State played four non-conference games: Miami (Ohio) of the Mid-American Conference, UCF and UAB of Conference USA, and California of the Pac-12 Conference. Ohio State had their only bye week between their games against Illinois and Wisconsin. Ohio State was ineligible to advance beyond their twelve regular season games and unable to participate in the Big Ten Championship Game or any bowl games.

Beyond weekly television coverage, all games during the 2012 season were broadcast on the Ohio State Football Radio Network. Paul Keels headed the crew with play-by-play, Jim Lachey with color commentary, Marty Bannister as sideline and locker room reporter and Skip Mosic serving as the pre-game and halftime show host.

Date	Time	Opponent	Rank	Site	TV	Result	Attendance
September 1	12:00 p.m.	Miami (OH)*	No. 18	Ohio Stadium; Columbus, OH	BTN	W 56–10	105,039
September 8	12:00 p.m.	UCF*	No. 14	Ohio Stadium; Columbus, OH	ESPN2	W 31–16	104,745
September 15	12:00 p.m.	California*	No. 12	Ohio Stadium; Columbus, OH	ABC	W 35–28	105,232
September 22	12:00 p.m.	UAB*	No. 16	Ohio Stadium; Columbus, OH	BTN	W 29–15	105,019
September 29	3:30 p.m.	at No. 20 Michigan State	No. 14	Spartan Stadium; East Lansing, MI (College GameDay)	ABC	W 17–16	76,705
October 6	8:00 p.m.	No. 21 Nebraska^{†}	No. 12	Ohio Stadium; Columbus, OH	ABC	W 63–38	106,121
October 13	8:00 p.m.	at Indiana	No. 8	Memorial Stadium; Bloomington, IN	BTN	W 52–49	48,880
October 20	12:00 p.m.	Purdue	No. 7	Ohio Stadium; Columbus, OH	ABC/ESPN2	W 29–22 ^{OT}	105,290
October 27	5:30 p.m.	at Penn State	No. 9	Beaver Stadium; University Park, PA (rivalry)	ESPN	W 35–23	107,818
November 3	3:30 p.m.	Illinois	No. 6	Ohio Stadium; Columbus, OH (Illibuck)	ESPN	W 52–22	105,311
November 17	3:30 p.m.	at Wisconsin	No. 6	Camp Randall Stadium; Madison, WI	ABC/ESPN2	W 21–14 ^{OT}	80,112
November 24	12:00 p.m.	No. 20 Michigan	No. 4	Ohio Stadium; Columbus, OH (rivalry)	ABC	W 26–21	105,889
*Non-conference game; ^{†}Homecoming; Rankings from AP Poll released prior to the game; All times are in Eastern time

== Game summaries ==
=== Miami (OH) ===
Team	1	2	3	4	Total
Miami (OH)	3	0	7	0	10
• No. 18 Ohio State	0	21	14	21	56

- Date: September 1
- Location: Ohio Stadium
  Columbus, OH
- Game start: 12:00 p.m.
- Elapsed time: 3:27
- Game attendance: 105,039
- Game weather: Partly cloudy, 82 °F (28 °C), wind SE 7 mph (11 km/h)
- Referee: Todd Geerlings
- TV announcers (BTN): Eric Collins, Derek Rackley and Lisa Byington

Scoring summary
1	5:06	Miami (OH)	Kaleb Patterson 22-yard field goal	Miami (OH) 3–0
2	13:49	Ohio State	Devin Smith 23-yard pass from Braxton Miller (Drew Basil kick)	Ohio State 7–3
2	11:03	Ohio State	Philly Brown 5-yard pass from Braxton Miller (Drew Basil kick)	Ohio State 14–3
2	5:17	Ohio State	Carlos Hyde 4-yard run (Basil kick)	Ohio State 21–3
3	14:43	Ohio State	Braxton Miller 65-yard run (Drew Basil kick)	Ohio State 28–3
3	12:41	Ohio State	Bradley Roby 1-yard fumble return (Drew Basil kick)	Ohio State 35–3
3	10:24	Miami (OH)	Nick Harwell 44-yard pass from Zac Dysert (Kaleb Patterson kick)	Ohio State 35–10
4	14:04	Ohio State	Carlos Hyde 8-yard run (Drew Basil kick)	Ohio State 42–10
4	9:33	Ohio State	Zach Boren 2-yard run (Drew Basil kick)	Ohio State 49–10
4	0:44	Ohio State	Bri'onte Dunn 4-yard run (Drew Basil kick)	Ohio State 56–10

Ohio State began their 2012 season on a humid and overcast afternoon in Columbus, Ohio. Urban Meyer led the Buckeyes onto the field for the first time as head coach to face the Miami RedHawks, a team they last faced in 2005. The game began with both teams struggling on offense, with a Miami field goal being to the only score of the quarter. Ohio State had four possessions during the first quarter, but was only able to gain 48 yards. Ohio State quarterback Braxton Miller completed only 1 of 7 on pass attempts, gaining only five yards. Miami was able to capitalize on defensive breakdowns by the Buckeyes and with kicker Kaleb Patterson converting a 24-yard field goal to put the RedHawks up 3–0. Miami quarterback Zac Dysert was able to throw for 165 yards, completing 13 of 23 passes. The Buckeyes turned their offense around at the beginning of the second quarter with a 23-yard touchdown pass from Miller to receiver Devin Smith. The 7–3 lead soon turned into a 21–3 lead for the Buckeyes heading into halftime. Ohio State was able to score on three of their four possessions during the second quarter with two touchdown passes from Miller to Smith and Brown, as well as a Carlos Hyde touchdown run later in the quarter. Ohio State complied 297 yards during the quarter compared to Miami's 38.

The second half of the game saw the Ohio State defense and offense continue to step up and hold the lead. The Buckeyes immediately got on the board again with 65-yard touchdown run from Miller 17 seconds into the third quarter. The Buckeye defense stepped up on the corresponding RedHawk possession, recovering a fumbled for a touchdown on a Miami attempted punt. This fumble recovery gave Ohio State a 35–3 lead. Miami would score their only touchdown of the day later in the quarter, making it a 35–10 game heading into the fourth quarter. Buckeyes quarterback Braxton Miller was taken out of the game during the third quarter with cramps and was replaced by junior quarterback Kenny Guiton. Ohio State was able to score three touchdowns during the fourth quarter, all on the ground, with Hyde, Zach Boren and Bri'onte Dunn all scoring respectively. Ohio State won the game by a final score of 56–10 and went to 1–0 on the season, giving head coach Meyer his first win as Buckeye head coach. Ohio State was able to gain 538 yards during the game, with Miami compiling only 312 total during the game. Braxton Miller completed 14 of 24 passes for 207 yards and two touchdown passes, with Kenny Guiton completing 5 of 9 for 37 yards. Miller also rushed for a total of 161 yards, a new Ohio State quarterback record.

=== UCF ===
Team	1	2	3	4	Total
UCF	3	7	6	0	16
• #14 Ohio State	7	10	14	0	31

- Date: September 8
- Location: Ohio Stadium
  Columbus, OH
- Game start: 12:00 p.m.
- Elapsed time: 3:11
- Game attendance: 104,745
- Game weather: Partly cloudy, 61 °F (16 °C), wind NW 12 mph (19 km/h)
- Referee: Randy Smith
- TV announcers (ESPN2): Beth Mowins, Joey Galloway

Scoring summary
1	9:35	Ohio State	Braxton Miller 37-yard run (Drew Basil kick)	Ohio State 7–0
1	0:12	UCF	Shawn Moffitt 28-yard field goal	Ohio State 7–3
2	9:58	Ohio State	Drew Basil 24-yard field goal	Ohio State 10–3
2	6:54	UCF	Justin Tukes 1-yard pass from Blake Bortles (Shawn Moffitt kick)	10–10
2	0:15	Ohio State	Braxton Miller 6-yard run (Drew Basil kick)	Ohio State 17–10
3	10:25	Ohio State	Jake Stoneburner 12-yard pass from Braxton Miller (Drew Basil kick)	Ohio State 24–10
3	8:08	Ohio State	Braxton Miller 8-yard run (Drew Basil kick)	Ohio State 31–10
3	1:37	UCF	Billy Giovanetti 2-yard pass from Blake Bortles (Shawn Moffitt kick blocked)	Ohio State 31–16

Ohio State faced the University of Central Florida Knights for the first time, hosting them at Ohio Stadium in front of a crowd of 104,745. The Buckeyes opened at a much faster pace than they did the previous week, with their first offensive drive of the game going for 71 yards and eventually ending with a touchdown on a Braxton Miller 37-yard run, giving Ohio State an early 7–0 lead. The Buckeye defense was also effective early, stopping the Knights on their first two offensive possessions of the game. However, following an Ohio State turnover on downs at midfield, UCF was able to drive down the field and get on the board following a Shawn Moffitt field goal. The first quarter ended with Ohio State holding onto a 7–3 and a Drew Basil field goal early in the second quarter gave the Buckeyes a 10–3 lead. However, in contrast to the previous week, Ohio State was unable to pull away from the Knights in the second quarter, with a very efficient 78-yard drive by the Knights midway through the second quarter resulting in a touchdown pass from Blake Bortles and a tie game at 10–10. On the next Ohio State offensive possession, the Buckeyes were unable to hold onto the ball and turned it over to the Knights due to a fumble, around midfield. However, just a few plays later, the Buckeyes regained possession on a Travis Howard interception. The turnover gave way to an eight-play, 48-yard drive for the Buckeyes and resulted in a touchdown, giving Ohio State a 17–10 lead going into halftime. Ohio State had 240 total yards during the first half and scored on three of five possessions.

The second half opened well for the Buckeyes, who converted on the first possession for a touchdown pass from Miller to Jake Stoneburner. The Knights gave the ball back to Ohio State following an Etienne Sabino interception of Bortles. Ohio State capitalized again on offense and took a 31–10 on a Miller run, taking a 21-point lead with 8:08 left in the third quarter. However, UCF responded on their next possession by going 84 yards in 14 plays, ending the drive with a touchdown pass from Bortles. The extra point was blocked by freshman Adolphus Washington, resulting in a 31–16 Buckeyes lead heading into the fourth quarter. The Knights began the fourth quarter with the ball deep in Ohio State territory; however, another Ohio State interception prevented any score from UCF. Penalties and misplays stalled the Buckeyes offense for the rest of the day, but the Buckeyes defense kept UCF out of the end zone and did not allow any points during the fourth quarter. Ohio State won the game 31–16 and with the win went to 2–0 on the season. Ohio State had 411 yards of total offense, with 256 of those yards coming from their running game. Braxton Miller completed 19 of 25 passes on the day and led the team in rushing with 141 yards.

=== California ===
Team	1	2	3	4	Total
California	7	0	7	14	28
• No. 12 Ohio State	13	7	0	15	35

- Date: September 15
- Location: Ohio Stadium
  Columbus, OH
- Game start: 12:00 p.m.
- Elapsed time: 3:34
- Game attendance: 105,232
- Game weather: Partly cloudy, 65 °F (18 °C), wind N 1 mph (1.6 km/h)
- Referee: Bill LeMonnier
- TV announcers (ABC): Sean McDonough, Chris Spielman

Scoring summary
1	5:11	Ohio State	Braxton Miller 55-yard run (Drew Basil kick failed)	Ohio State 6–0
1	2:38	California	Chris Harper 19-yard pass from Zach Maynard (Vincenzo D'Amato kick)	California 7–6
1	1:27	Ohio State	Devin Smith 25-yard pass from Braxton Miller (Drew Basil kick)	Ohio State 13–7
2	13:30	Ohio State	Jake Stoneburner 1-yard pass from Braxton Millers	Ohio State 20–7
3	9:34	California	Brendan Bigelow 81-yard run (Vincenzo D'Amato kick)	Ohio State 20–14
4	12:26	California	Zach Maynard 1-yard run (Vincenzo D'Amato kick)	California 21–20
4	8:31	Ohio State	Jake Stoneburner 3-yard pass from Braxton Miller (Braxton Miller rush)	Ohio State 28–21
4	8:10	California	Brendan Bigelow 59-yard run (Vincenzo D'Amato kick)	28–28
4	3:26	Ohio State	Devin Smith 72-yard pass from Braxton Miller (Drew Basil kick)	Ohio State 35–28

Ohio State faced the California Golden Bears in their third game of the season on a sunny afternoon at Ohio Stadium. The Buckeyes last faced the Golden Bears during the 1972 season. The game began with both teams struggling on offense with both the Buckeyes and the Golden Bears first possessions resulting in punts. Ohio State also punted on their second possession, but was able on the next drive due to a 55-yard Braxton Miller touchdown run. Drew Basil capped off the drive with a missed extra point, which allowed California to take the lead on their following possession, after a 75-yard drive. Ohio State responded with a 75-yard drive of their own and ended the first quarter holding a 13–7 lead. The second quarter saw a tremendously slower pace for both teams, with the only scoring coming from a touchdown pass from Miller to Stoneburner. Following a drive filled with penalties, California was unable to take advantage of a 40-yard field goal, missing it and sending Ohio State into the half with a 20–7 lead.

The Ohio State offense was unable to put together a serious drive in the third quarter and defense was unable to make key stops on crucial plays. A Bredan Bigelow 81-yard touchdown run, the third longest run given up at Ohio Stadium, gave the Golden Bears the only points of the quarter, cutting the Buckeyes lead to 20–14. The Golden Bears missed a 42-yard field goal that would have brought them to within three points; however were on the Buckeye side of the field heading into the fourth quarter. An eight-play, 46-yard touchdown drive gave the Golden Bears a 21–20 lead, their first lead of the game. However, the Buckeyes responded, executing an 11-play drive which resulted in the Buckeyes taking a 26–21 lead, and after a successful two-point conversion, took a 28–21 lead with 8:31 lead. Two plays later, Bigelow was again off to the end zone and tied the game at 28–28 midway through the fourth. Ohio State put together a drive for a 72-yard touchdown pass from Miller to Devin Smith, giving Ohio State a 35–28 lead. The Buckeye defense held for the final three minutes and following an interception from Christian Bryant, the Buckeyes ran out the clock to their third victory of the season, starting 3–0. Braxton Miller threw for 249 yards and completed 16 of 30 passes with five touchdowns, four on passes and one run. Returning starter Jordan Hall ran for 87 yards on 17 attempts with wide receiver Devin Smith accounting for 145 yards on five receptions. Linebacker Ryan Shazier led the way for the defense with 13 tackles and one sack.

=== UAB ===
Team	1	2	3	4	Total
UAB	6	6	0	3	15
• No. 16 Ohio State	0	21	0	8	29

- Date: September 22
- Location: Ohio Stadium
  Columbus, OH
- Game start: 12:00 p.m.
- Elapsed time: 3:17
- Game attendance: 105,019
- Game weather: Partly cloudy, 61 °F (16 °C), wind WNW 8 mph (13 km/h)
- Referee: Dan Capron
- TV announcers (BTN): Eric Collins, Derek Rackley and Lisa Byington

Scoring summary
1	9:21	UAB	Nick Adams 20-yard blocked punt return (Ty Long kick blocked)	UAB 6–0
2	10:27	UAB	Ty Long 47-yard field goal	UAB 9–0
2	6:31	Ohio State	Rod Smith 1-yard run (Drew Basil kick)	UAB 9–7
2	3:44	UAB	Ty Long 54-yard field goal	UAB 12–7
2	1:50	Ohio State	Braxton Miller 12-yard run (Drew Basil kick)	Ohio State 14–12
2	1:02	Ohio State	Zach Boren 2-yard run (Drew Basil kick)	Ohio State 21–12
4	13:44	UAB	Ty Long 34-yard field goal	Ohio State 21–15
4	5:03	Ohio State	Braxton Miller 1-yard run (Braxton Miller rush)	Ohio State 29–15

The Buckeyes faced the UAB Blazers of the University of Alabama at Birmingham for the first time ever on a mild afternoon at Ohio Stadium in front of a capacity crowd. Ohio State began the game slowly on offense, as they had in their previous non-conference games. UAB dominated the majority of the first quarter with the Blazers out-gaining the Buckeyes in total offensive yards 99 to 42. With both team struggling to put together any offensive threat early, the special teams for UAB provided the key play of the first quarter on a blocked punt by Calvin Jones, which gave the Blazers a 6–0 lead, after the extra point was blocked. UAB went ahead 9–0 early in the second quarter; however, they only held the lead briefly as Braxton Miller and the Ohio State offense quickly put together a 75-yard drive, ending in a Rod Smith touchdown run. Following a UAB field goal, Ohio State put together two touchdown drives in the last two minutes of the first half, one a Miller 12-yard touchdown run and another a touchdown run from fullback Zach Boren. Going into halftime, Ohio State held a 21–12 lead.

Ohio State deferred the ball at the beginning of the game and was set to receive to begin the second half; however, UAB head coach Garrick McGee called an onside to begin the second half, with the Blazers recovering. The Ohio State defense held up against the Blazer offense, but as was the case in the first quarter, the offense was unable to mount any significant threat. UAB once again out-gained the Buckeyes during the quarter, 107 to 43 in total offensive yardage, but penalties, especially three chop-block calls, would eventually stall any scoring chances. The fourth quarter began with UAB kicker Ty Long converting on a 34-yard field goal cutting the Buckeyes lead to 21–15. The Ohio State defense continued to hold against UAB and would shut them out the remainder of the game. The Buckeye offense went on a 71-yard drive ending in a Braxton Miller touchdown run with about five minutes remaining in the game, which would eventually put the game out of reach for UAB and give the Buckeyes the 29–15 victory. With the win, Ohio State moved to 4–0 on the season and was undefeated heading into Big Ten conference play. Urban Meyer also became the first Ohio State head coach since Earle Bruce to win his first four games coached. UAB out-gained Ohio State in total offensive yardage throughout the entire game 403 to 347 as well as in total first downs 22 to 20. Miller completed 12 of 20 passes, rushed for 84 yards and scored two touchdowns. Running back Jordan Hall, in his second game following his injury, led the team in rushing with 105 total rushing yards.

=== Michigan State ===
Team	1	2	3	4	Total
• #14 Ohio State	7	0	10	0	17
#20 Michigan State	3	0	10	3	16

- Date: September 29
- Location: Spartan Stadium
  East Lansing, MI
- Game start: 3:30 p.m.
- Elapsed time: 3:12
- Game attendance: 76,705
- Game weather: Partly Cloudy, 69 °F (21 °C), Wind NNW 7 mph (11 km/h)
- Referee: John O'Neill
- TV announcers (ABC): Brent Musburger, Kirk Herbstreit and Heather Cox

Scoring summary
1	12:09	Ohio State	Jordan Hall 1-yard run (Drew Basil kick)	Ohio State 7–0
1	8:23	Michigan State	Dan Conroy 34-yard field goal	Ohio State 7–3
3	11:04	Michigan State	Dan Conroy 50-yard field goal	Ohio State 7–6
3	6:08	Ohio State	Drew Basil 26-yard field goal	Ohio State 10–6
3	4:49	Michigan State	Keith Mumphery 29-yard pass from Andrew Maxwell (Dan Conroy kick)	Michigan State 13–10
3	3:05	Ohio State	Devin Smith 63-yard pass from Braxton Miller (Drew Basil kick)	Ohio State 17–10
4	7:07	Michigan State	Dan Conroy 48-yard field goal	Ohio State 17–16

Ohio State traveled to East Lansing to take on the Michigan State Spartans for their first Big Ten game of the year, as well as their first game away from Columbus. The Buckeyes were looking for revenge for the previous year's 10–7 loss at Ohio Stadium, which was Michigan State's first victory over the Buckeyes since 1999. The Buckeyes opened the game by marched down the field on eight plays and scoring a touchdown to take a 7–0 lead on their first possession. Michigan State responded with a Dan Conroy field goal on their opening drive to make it 7–3 early in the first quarter. As the tempo of the game began to slow down, both defenses began to take over the game. The Ohio State special teams blocked a punt during the second quarter, but it proved to be in vain as Braxton Miller threw an interception afterwards. As was the case earlier, the rest of the second quarter was a defensive battle, with no one scoring and Michigan State's Conroy missing a field goal, which would later prove to be the deciding points. The first half ended with the score remaining 7–3.

The second half began just like the first half with both offenses scoring early. Michigan State kicked their second field goal of the day with 11:04 remaining in the third, which closed the gap to a 7–6 game. Ohio State and Drew Basil would respond with an impressive drive of their own, resulting in a field goal and restoring their four-point lead at 10–6. Michigan State would score their first touchdown of the game midway through the third quarter on a 29-yard touchdown pass from Andrew Maxwell to Keith Mumphrey. Mumphrey was able to break several Buckeye tackles and score, giving the Spartans a 13–10 lead. Once again the Buckeyes would respond quickly, this time on a four-play touchdown drive, which ended with Braxton Miller throwing a 63-yard touchdown pass to Devin Smith. With the touchdown, Ohio State led the game 17–13, which would be the score at the end of the third quarter. Michigan State had several opportunities throughout the fourth quarter to take the lead, but penalties and missed field goals would eventually halt any momentum. The Spartans did convert on a Conroy 48-yard field goal midway through the fourth quarter to close to 17–16. After the Buckeye defense stopped the Spartans, the Ohio State offense would run out the clock and end the game with a 17–16 victory. The victory was Ohio State's first Big Ten conference win of the season, as well as Urban Meyer's first success as a Big Ten head coach. Ohio State stayed undefeated at 5–0 on the season. Braxton Miller led the team in both rushing and passing, completing 16 of 23 passes for 179 yards and one touchdown, along with 145 rushing yards.

=== Nebraska ===
Team	1	2	3	4	Total
#21 Nebraska	14	10	7	7	38
• #12 Ohio State	7	28	14	14	63

- Date: October 6
- Location: Ohio Stadium
  Columbus, OH
- Game start: 8:00 p.m.
- Elapsed time: 3:33
- Game attendance: 106,121
- Game weather: Partly Cloudy, 52 °F (11 °C), Wind NW 9 mph (14 km/h)
- Referee: Todd Geerlings
- TV announcers (ABC): Brad Nessler, Todd Blackledge and Holly Rowe

Scoring summary
1	8:29	Ohio State	Bradley Roby 41-yard interception return (Drew Basil kick)	Ohio State 7–0
1	5:26	Nebraska	Ameer Abdullah 1-yard run (Brett Maher kick)	7–7
1	1:50	Nebraska	Ameer Abdullah 3-yard run (Brett Maher kick)	Nebraska 14–7
2	11:59	Nebraska	Brett Maher 26-yard field goal	Nebraska 17–7
2	10:49	Ohio State	Carlos Hyde 1-yard run (Drew Basil kick)	Nebraska 17–14
2	8:58	Ohio State	Jeff Heuerman 18-yard pass from Braxton Miller (Drew Basil kick)	Ohio State 21–17
2	6:59	Nebraska	Taylor Martinez 9-yard run (Brett Maher kick)	Nebraska 24–21
2	3:11	Ohio State	Carlos Hyde 7-yard run (Drew Basil kick)	Ohio State 28–24
2	0:23	Ohio State	Braxton Miller 31-yard run (Drew Basil kick)	Ohio State 35–24
3	12:50	Nebraska	Ben Cotton 3-yard pass from Taylor Martinez (Brett Maher kick)	Ohio State 35–31
3	8:15	Ohio State	Carlos Hyde 1-yard run (Drew Basil kick)	Ohio State 42–31
3	8:15	Ohio State	Carlos Hyde 1-yard run (Drew Basil kick)	Ohio State 42–31
3	5:50	Ohio State	Corey Brown 76-yard punt return (Drew Basil kick)	Ohio State 49–31
4	10:27	Ohio State	Rod Smith 33-yard run (Drew Basil kick)	Ohio State 56–31
4	5:38	Nebraska	Taylor Martinez 2-yard run (Brett Maher kick)	Ohio State 56–38
4	0:48	Ohio State	Carlos Hyde 16-yard run (Drew Basil kick)	Ohio State 63–38

The Buckeyes played host to the Nebraska Cornhuskers under the lights at Ohio Stadium on homecoming in front of the largest crowd in Ohio Stadium history. In their previous meeting, Nebraska defeated the Buckeyes in their first meeting as conference foes, 34–27, during the 2011 season. Ohio State started out slowly on offense, but scored the first points of the game following a Bradley Roby interception return for a touchdown. The Nebraska offense came back to score on their two drives to end the first quarter. Two Ameer Abdullah touchdown runs gave Nebraska their first lead of the night at 14–7 at the end of the first quarter. Nebraska continued to dominate on offense during the first quarter and scored a field goal following an eight-play drive, giving them a 17–7 lead. Ohio State responded on their first drive of the second quarter, with a Carlos Hyde touchdown run. The Cornhuskers and the Buckeyes would shoot it out offensively throughout the second quarter. A touchdown pass from Ohio State's Braxton Miller and a touchdown run for Nebraska's Taylor Martinez led to a 24–21 score favoring Nebraska midway through the second quarter. Ohio State ended the quarter with Carlos Hyde and Braxton Miller both scoring on touchdown runs, giving the Buckeyes a 35–24 lead at halftime.

The second half continued the offensive showdown seen during the second quarter. Nebraska scored on their first possession of the half on a Martinez touchdown pass, closing the score to 35–31. However, both the Ohio State offense and defense would step up throughout the third and fourth quarters. Ohio State scored two touchdowns during the third quarter, on two Carlos Hyde touchdown runs and on a Corey Brown punt return. Ohio State held a 49–31 lead heading into the fourth quarter. The Buckeyes early in the fourth quarter put the game away with a 56–31 lead, and did not give up another Nebraska score until midway through the fourth quarter on a Martinez touchdown run. Ohio State scored their final touchdown of the game with just seconds remaining and won 63–38. Ohio State moved to 6–0 on the season and 2–0 in conference play, becoming the only undefeated team remaining in the Big Ten. Ohio State out-gained the Cornhuskers in total yardage 498 to 437. Braxton Miller led the Buckeyes in both rushing and passing, scoring two touchdowns.

=== Indiana ===
Team	1	2	3	4	Total
• #8 Ohio State	10	14	14	14	52
Indiana	7	7	13	22	49

- Date: October 13
- Location: Memorial Stadium
  Bloomington, IN
- Game start: 8:00 p.m.
- Elapsed time: 4:02
- Game attendance: 48,880
- Game weather: Cloudy, 67 °F (19 °C), wind S 12 mph (19 km/h)
- Referee: Bill LeMonnier
- TV announcers (BTN): Eric Collins, Derek Rackley and Jeremy Leman

Scoring summary
1	10:52	Ohio State	Corey Brown 12-yard run (Drew Basil kick)	Ohio State 7–0
1	3:06	Ohio State	Drew Basil 35-yard field goal	Ohio State 10–0
1	2:00	Indiana	Stephen Houston 59-yard run (Mitch Ewald kick)	Ohio State 10–7
2	14:46	Indiana	Stephen Houston 7-yard run (Mitch Ewald kick)	Indiana 14–10
2	5:19	Ohio State	Bradley Roby blocked punt return (Drew Basil kick)	Ohio State 17–14
2	2:31	Ohio State	Devin Smith 60-yard pass from Braxton Miller (Drew Basil kick)	Ohio State 24–14
3	12:36	Indiana	Mitch Ewald 22-yard field goal	Indiana 24–17
3	12:18	Ohio State	Braxton Miller 67-yard touchdown run (Drew Basil kick)	Ohio State 31–17
3	8:40	Indiana	Shane Wynn 76-yard touchdown pass from Cameron Coffman (Mitch Ewald kick)	Ohio State 31–24
3	4:34	Ohio State	Carlos Hyde 14-yard pass from Kenny Guilton (Drew Basil kick)	Ohio State 38–24
3	3:54	Ohio State	Mitch Ewald 44-yard field goal	Ohio State 38–27
4	14:40	Ohio State	Carlos Hyde 1-yard run (Drew Basil kick)	Ohio State 45–27
4	10:30	Indiana	D'Angelo Roberts 1-yard run (Mitch Ewald kick)	Ohio State 45–34
4	6:47	Ohio State	Devin Smith 46-yard pass from Braxton Miller (Drew Basil kick)	Ohio State 52–34
4	1:40	Indiana	Duwyce Wilson 12-yard pass from Nate Sudfeld (Mitch Ewald kick)	Ohio State 52–41
4	1:05	Indiana	Stephen Houston 25-yard pass from Nate Sudfeld (Cody Latimer rush)	Ohio State 52–49

The Buckeyes faced their first Leaders Division counterpart of the season in the Indiana Hoosiers. In their previous meeting, the Buckeyes defeated Indiana 34–20, during the 2011 season. The Buckeyes began the game well on offense with their first possession going nine plays and finishing with Corey Brown touchdown run. A Drew Basil field goal later in the first quarter gave the Buckeyes a 10–0 lead. This Buckeye lead soon disappeared on the ensuing Hoosiers drives. Stephen Houston scored on a 59- and a 7-yard touchdown run, giving the Hoosiers their first and only lead of the evening at 14–10, early in the second quarter. After struggling on offense earlier in the second quarter, they capitalized on their final drives of the half. A Bradley Roby blocked punt return and a Devin Smith touchdown reception from Braxton Miller allowed the Buckeyes to head into halftime with a 24–14 lead.

The second half of the game turned into an offense shootout, with both teams capitalizing on big plays, while the defense struggled consistently getting off of the field. Mitch Ewald kicked a field goal for the Hoosiers after their first drive of the half, which was followed by a 67-yard touchdown run for Miller and the Buckeyes. Indiana scored their first passing touchdown of the game in the third quarter on a pass from Cameron Coffman to Shane Wynn. Carlos Hyde scored a touchdown for Ohio State on a 14-yard run, giving the Buckeyes a 38–27 lead heading into the fourth quarter. The offensive shootout continued into the fourth quarter with Indiana dominating the Ohio State defense for most of the quarter. Hyde scored another rushing touchdown early in the fourth quarter, giving the Buckeyes a 45–27 lead. A Hoosier rushing touchdown, followed by a Miller touchdown pass, kept Ohio State ahead 52–34 midway through the fourth quarter. The Hoosiers mounted a comeback later in the fourth with Indiana scoring on a 12-yard touchdown pass and closing the lead to a 14-point game. An onside kick recovered by the Hoosiers allowed them to drive down and score on another pass touchdown from quarterback Nate Sudfeld, with the two-point conversion successful. Ohio State recovered the final onside kick and avoided the upset, insuring their 52–49 win and a 7–0 record on the season, as well as a 3–0 conference record. Carlos Hyde led the Buckeyes in rushing with 156 yards and one touchdown. Braxton Miller led the Buckeyes in passing yards with 211 and three touchdowns.

=== Purdue ===
Team	1	2	3	4	OT	Total
Purdue	13	0	7	2	0	22
• No. 7 Ohio State	7	0	7	8	7	29

- Date: October 20
- Location: Ohio Stadium
  Columbus, OH
- Game start: 12:00 p.m.
- Elapsed time: 3:36
- Game attendance: 105,290
- Game weather: Cloudy, 51 °F (11 °C), wind WSW 11 mph (18 km/h)
- Referee: Mike Cannon
- TV announcers (ABC): Beth Mowins, Joey Galloway

Scoring summary
1	14:43	Purdue	Akeem Shavers 83-yard pass from Caleb TerBush (Paul Griggs kick blocked)	Purdue 6–0
1	5:29	Ohio State	Braxton Miller 1-yard run (Drew Basil kick)	Ohio State 7–6
1	5:17	Purdue	Akeem Hunt 100-yard kickoff return (Paul Griggs kick)	Purdue 13–7
3	7:41	Ohio State	Carlos Hyde 2-yard run (Drew Basil kick)	Ohio State 14–13
3	3:49	Purdue	Gary Bush 31-yard pass from Caleb TerBush (Paul Griggs kick)	Purdue 20–14
4	10:11	Purdue	Andrew Norwell illegal block penalty in end zone for a safety	Purdue 22–14
4	0:03	Ohio State	Chris Fields 2-yard pass from Kenny Guiton (Jeff Heuerman pass from Kenny Guiton)	Tied 22–22
OT	0:00	Ohio State	Carlos Hyde 1-yard run (Drew Basil kick)	Ohio State 29–22

Ohio State returned to Ohio Stadium to face the Purdue Boilermakers. In their previous meeting, Purdue defeated the Buckeyes 26–23 in overtime, during the 2011 season. Purdue scored quickly on their first possession with an 83-yard pass from Caleb TerBush to Akeem Shavers that would give them a 6–0 lead just 17 seconds into the game. The extra point attempt by Paul Griggs was blocked and allowed Ohio State to take the lead later in the quarter, at 7–6, after a Braxton Miller touchdown run. Purdue continued to score on big plays by taking back the ensuing kickoff 100-yards, which would give the Boilermakers a 13–7 lead. Purdue's kick return would be the last points scored in the first half, with a defensive battle beginning to take shape. The Boilermaker defense was able to shut down the Buckeye offense, forcing them to punt on many of their drives throughout the second quarter. Purdue was able to threaten in Ohio State territory, however a C.J. Barnett interception and a Griggs missed field goal would ensure that the Boilermakers went into halftime with only a six-point lead.

Both teams opened the second half punting on their first drives respectively. On their second drive of the half, the Buckeyes drove down and scored on a Carlos Hyde run, giving then the lead back, at 14–13. A 31-yard touchdown completion from Terbush to Gary Bush on Purdue's next drive switched the lead back to the Boilermakers at 20–14. A Braxton Miller fumble for the Buckeyes and a Griggs blocked field goal for the Boilermakers would keep both teams out of the end zone for the remainder of the third quarter. Late in the third quarter Miller took the ball and ran for 24 yards, but at the same time was pushed to the ground and remained there for several minutes. Kenny Guiton was brought in to replace Miller and led the team for the remainder of the game. Ohio State punted early in the fourth quarter as did Purdue on their first drive of the quarter. On the Buckeye's second drive of the quarter an illegal block penalty on Andrew Norwell was accepted for a safety, giving the Boilermakers a 22–14 lead. Purdue was unable capitalize on the Buckeye's mistake, punting on their next drive. A Guiton interception on the Buckeye's next drive made an Ohio State comeback seem improbable, however, the Buckeye defense forced the Boilermakers to punt, giving them one last chance. Guiton was able to drive Ohio State down to the goal line and throw a touchdown pass to Chris Fields, with a two-point conversion pass to Jeff Heuerman, which tied the game at 22–22. In overtime, Ohio State went on offense first and would score in five plays on a Carlos Hyde run, giving them a 29–22 lead. The Buckeye defense was able to stop the Boilermakers on offense and ensure the win, going 8–0 overall and 4–0 in conference play.

=== Penn State ===
Team	1	2	3	4	Total
• #9 Ohio State	0	7	21	7	35
Penn State	0	7	3	13	23

- Date: October 27
- Location: Beaver Stadium
  State College, PA
- Game start: 5:30 p.m.
- Elapsed time: 3:10
- Game attendance: 107,818
- Game weather: Cloudy, 59 °F (15 °C), Wind SE 10 mph (16 km/h)
- Referee: Alex Kemp
- TV announcers (ESPN): Sean McDonough, Chris Spielman

Scoring summary
2	6:15	Penn State	Michael Yancich recovered blocked punt (Sam Ficken kick)	Penn State 7–0
2	0:34	Ohio State	Carlos Hyde 1-yard run (Drew Basil kick)	7–7
3	13:41	Ohio State	Ryan Shazier 17-yard interception return (Drew Basil kick)	Ohio State 14–7
3	9:50	Penn State	Sam Ficken 27-yard field goal	Ohio State 14–10
3	3:30	Ohio State	Braxton Miller 1-yard run (Drew Basil kick)	Ohio State 21–10
3	0:40	Ohio State	Braxton Miller 1-yard run (Drew Basil kick)	Ohio State 28–10
4	9:49	Penn State	Matt Lehman 2-yard pass from Matt McGloin (Bill Belton rush failed)	Ohio State 28–16
4	6:11	Ohio State	Jake Stoneburner 72-yard pass from Braxton Miller (Drew Basil kick)	35–16
4	1:41	Penn State	Kyle Carter 20-yard pass from Matt McGloin (Sam Ficken kick)	Ohio State 35–23

Ohio State traveled to Happy Valley to renew their annual rivalry with the Penn State Nittany Lions. The Buckeyes previous game against the Nittany Lions came during the 2011 season, when Penn State defeated the Buckeyes 20–14. In the previous week, starting quarterback Braxton Miller left the game against Purdue at the end of the third quarter and did not return. Miller was cleared to return to the team later in the day and would start against Penn State. The first quarter was very uneventful for both teams, with each drive ending in a punt. The stalemate was finally broken on Ohio State's sixth drive, in which Mike Hull blocked a Ben Buchannan punt in the endzone, giving Penn State a 7–0 lead midway through the second quarter. Ohio State would respond on their next offensive drive, driving for 75 yards and scoring on a Carlos Hyde touchdown run, tying the score heading into halftime.

The defensive battle continued early in the second half, giving the edge to Ohio State. On Penn State's first drive of the third quarter, Ryan Shazier intercepted a Matt McGloin pass and returned it 17-yards for a touchdown. Sam Ficken would kick a 27-yard field goal on Penn State's ensuing drive, giving the Nittany Lions their first offensive points of the day and closing the score to 14–10. Penn State would force a Braxton Miller interception on the next drive, but would eventually have to punt. Ohio State was then able to drive 57 yards and score on a Braxton Miller touchdown run, giving them the 21–10 advantage midway through the third quarter. Ohio State's next offensive drive ended in the same fashion, on a Miller run, giving them a 28–10 lead heading into the fourth quarter. Penn State was finally able to score their first offensive touchdown early in the fourth quarter off of a McGloin pass. Miller completed a touchdown pass to Jake Stoneburner on Ohio State's next driving, further knocking Penn State out of the game with their 35–16 advantage. The Nittany Lions scored on their last offensive drive of the game, making the final score 35–23 in favor of Ohio State. The win kept Ohio State undefeated and put them at 5–0 in Big Ten conference play. Miller rushed for over 100 yards for the sixth time of the season while also passing for 143 yards.

=== Illinois ===
Illibuck

Team	1	2	3	4	Total
Illinois	6	0	8	8	22
• #6 Ohio State	7	24	7	14	52

- Date: November 3
- Location: Ohio Stadium
  Columbus, OH
- Game start: 3:30 p.m.
- Elapsed time: 3:17
- Game attendance: 105,311
- Game weather: Cloudy, 45 °F (7 °C), Wind NNE 1 mph (1.6 km/h)
- Referee: Dave Witvoet
- TV announcers (ESPN): Beth Mowins, Joey Galloway

Scoring summary
1	7:48	Illinois	Nick Immekus 43-yard field goal	Illinois 3–0
1	4:14	Ohio State	Carlos Hyde 3-yard run (Drew Basil kick)	Ohio State 7–3
1	0:38	Illinois	Nick Immekus 28-yard field goal	Ohio State 7–6
2	12:10	Ohio State	Drew Basil 31-yard field goal	Ohio State 10–6
2	9:01	Ohio State	Carlos Hyde 5-yard run (Drew Basil kick)	Ohio State 17–6
2	5:14	Ohio State	Rod Smith 51-yard pass from Braxton Miller (Drew Basil kick)	Ohio State 24–6
2	1:56	Ohio State	Carlos Hyde 3-yard run (Drew Basil kick)	Ohio State 31–6
3	6:45	Ohio State	Braxton Miller 2-yard run (Drew Basil kick)	Ohio State 38–6
3	0:53	Illinois	Jon Davis 1-yard run (Matt LaCosse pass from Tim Russell)	Ohio State 38–14
4	12:39	Ohio State	Corey Brown 37-yard pass from Braxton Miller (Drew Basil kick)	Ohio State 45–14
4	4:56	Illinois	Ashante Williams 77-yard fumble recovery (Tim Russell rush)	Ohio State 45–22
4	1:26	Ohio State	Bri'onte Dunn 3-yard run (Drew Basil kick)	Ohio State 52–22

Ohio State entered their annual matchup with Leaders Division foe Illinois undefeated and ranked sixth in the AP Poll. In their previous meeting, the Buckeyes defeated Illinois 17–7, during the 2011 season, winning the Illibuck trophy for the fourth consecutive season. Illinois received the ball first in the first quarter and were forced to punt, as was Ohio State on their first drive. Illinois would get on the board first, with a 39-yard drive that ended on a Nick Immekus 43-yard field goal, giving the Illini a 3–0 lead. Ohio State answered on their next offensive drive, going 79 yards in ten plays, while taking a 7–3 lead on a Carlos Hyde rush. A field goal on the next Illini drive would bring them within one point of the Buckeyes heading into the second quarter. The Ohio State offense, though, would be able break the game open during the second quarter, scoring 24 points and taking command of the game. The Buckeyes would score on their first four drives of the half, starting with a Drew Basil field goal, expanding the Ohio State lead to 10–6. Another Carlos Hyde touchdown rush and a Braxton Miller touchdown pass would put the Buckeyes up 24–6, with another Hyde touchdown run giving Ohio State the 31–6 advantage. The Buckeye defense would force Illinois to punt three times in the quarter and would intercept a Nathan Scheelhaase pass that would ensure they did not get into the endzone during the quarter.

The Ohio State defense was able to continue their superb performance in the third quarter, forcing the Illini to punt of their first drive of the half. Another touchdown, off of a Braxton Miller run, would give Ohio State a commanding 38–6 lead. Illinois scored their first touchdown of the game at the end of the third quarter and converted two points off of a Tim Russell pass. With the game well in hand by the fourth quarter, Ohio State was able to put in many second-string players, but were still able to score two touchdowns in the quarter on a Braxton Miller pass to Corey Brown and a Bri'onte Dunn run. The only Illini score for the remainder of the game came midway through the fourth quarter with a fumble recovery taken to the endzone. Ohio State won the blowout 52–22 and improved to 10–0 on the season and 6–0 in conference play. Braxton Miller carried the ball 18 times on the day for 73 yards and completed 12 of 20 passes for 226 yards.

=== Wisconsin ===
Team	1	2	3	4	OT	Total
• #6 Ohio State	7	7	0	0	7	21
Wisconsin	0	7	0	7	0	14

- Date: November 17
- Location: Camp Randall Stadium
  Madison, WI
- Game start: 3:30 p.m.
- Elapsed time: 3:27
- Game attendance: 80,112
- Game weather: Sunny, 54 °F (12 °C), Wind S 10 mph (16 km/h)
- Referee: Bill LeMonnier
- TV announcers (ABC): Joe Tessitore, Matt Millen

Scoring summary
1	1:58	Ohio State	Corey Brown 68-yard punt return (Drew Basil kick)	Ohio State 7–0
2	11:27	Ohio State	Carlos Hyde 15-yard run (Drew Basil kick)	Ohio State 14–0
2	7:30	Wisconsin	Montee Ball 7-yard run (Kyle French kick)	Ohio State 14–7
4	0:08	Wisconsin	Jacob Pederson 5-yard pass from Curt Phillips (Kyle French kick)	14–14
OT		Ohio State	Carlos Hyde 2-yard run (Drew Basil kick)	Ohio State 21–14

Ohio State traveled to Madison in their final road game of the season to face the Wisconsin Badgers. In their previous meeting, the Buckeyes defeated Wisconsin 33–29, during the 2011 season. Wisconsin received the ball first on offense, however, the Buckeye defense was able to force a three-and-out and set the tone for the remainder of the game. Braxton Miller and the Buckeyes offense drove 48 yards on their first possession of the game, but were forced to punt as well. A 43-yard punt return by Corey Brown late in the first quarter was the first score of the game, giving Ohio State the early 7–0 advantage. Braxton Miller moved Ohio State into good field position, which allowed Carlos Hyde to score his first touchdown of the game, giving the Buckeyes a 14–0 lead early in the second quarter. Montee Ball, who rushed for 191 yards on the day, would be instrumental in Wisconsin's fifth drive of the game. Ball would score for the Badgers on a 7-yard touchdown run. The defense for both teams began to take the game over again, with neither team scoring any more points in the first half. Ohio State went into half time with a 14–7 lead.

As in the first half, defense was the dominant force, in the second half of the game, with neither team getting into the end zone in the third quarter. Ohio State was forced to punt twice during the quarter, while the Badgers began to put a drive together midway through the third, not giving the ball back to the Buckeyes for the remainder of the quarter. The drive would end with Wisconsin kicker Kyle French missing a 40-yard field goal, keeping intact the 14–7 Buckeye lead. The Buckeye offense, incapable of doing much in the third quarter, faced the same problems in the fourth, with the Wisconsin defense forcing them to punt on every drive during the quarter. Wisconsin got the ball back in Buckeye territory with 1:33 to go in the game. Behind quarterback Curt Phillips and running back Montee Ball, the Badgers drove down and scored a touchdown on a Jacob Pederson reception with eight seconds left. Ohio State elected to go into overtime with the score at the end of regulation being 14–14. Ohio State was on offense first in the overtime period and scored on a Carlos Hyde touchdown run in four plays, giving them the 21–14 advantage. Wisconsin, needing a touchdown to force a second overtime, was not able to get a first down and was stopped by the Buckeye defense, giving Ohio State the victory. Ohio State won the Leaders Division of the Big Ten following the victory, but were still ineligible to go to the Big Ten Championship Game. Ohio State left Madison with an 11–0 record for the first time since the 2006 season and were in position to complete their first undefeated season since 2002 with one game remaining against arch rival Michigan.

=== Michigan ===
The Game

Team	1	2	3	4	Total
Michigan	7	14	0	0	21
• #4 Ohio State	10	10	3	3	26

- Date: November 24
- Location: Ohio Stadium
  Columbus, OH
- Game start: 12:00 p.m.
- Elapsed time: 3:11
- Game attendance: 105,899
- Game weather: Cloudy, 33 °F (1 °C), wind W 17 mph (27 km/h)
- Referee: John O'Neill
- TV announcers (ABC): Sean McDonough, Chris Spielman

Scoring summary
1	12:41	Ohio State	Carlos Hyde 3-yard run (Drew Basil kick)	Ohio State 7–0
1	7:10	Michigan	Roy Roundtree 75-yard pass from Devin Gardner (Brendan Gibbons kick)	7–7
1	0:37	Ohio State	Drew Basil 41-yard field goal	Ohio State 10–7
2	10:42	Michigan	Devin Gardner 2-yard run (Brendan Gibbons kick)	Michigan 14–10
2	1:30	Ohio State	Corey Brown 14-yard pass from Braxton Miller (Drew Basil kick)	Ohio State 17–14
2	0:40	Michigan	Denard Robinson 67-yard run (Brendan Gibbons kick)	Michigan 21–17
2	0:00	Ohio State	Drew Basil 52-yard field goal	Michigan 21–20
3	8:12	Ohio State	Drew Basil 28-yard field goal	Ohio State 23–21
4	6:26	Ohio State	Drew Basil 25-yard field goal	Ohio State 26–21

The Ohio State Buckeyes and Michigan Wolverines continued their annual fierce rivalry on November 24. The 108th edition of "The Game" marked the regular-season finale for both teams and the season finale for Ohio State due to their post-season ban. The game also marked Urban Meyer's first time as the head coach for the Buckeyes in "The Game" and Michigan head coach Brady Hoke's second game. In their previous meeting, Michigan defeated the Buckeyes 40–34 in 2011, Michigan's first victory over Ohio State since 2003. The Buckeyes opened the game on offense and took six plays to drive 75 yards and score a touchdown on a Carlos Hyde run. With Ohio State taking the early 7–0 lead, Michigan turned to starting quarterback Devin Gardner, who replaced Denard Robinson after his injury a few weeks earlier. Robinson was still used as a running threat throughout the game. On the Wolverines' first drive, Gardner was sacked deep in Ohio State territory, fumbled, giving the ball and the momentum to the Buckeyes. Michigan forced an Ohio State punt, but were penned deep in their own territory. The Wolverines made up for the field position in one play with a 75-yard touchdown pass from Devin Gardner to Roy Roundtree tying the game at seven. On the ensuing Ohio State possession, Braxton Miller gained the majority of the yards through the air and the ground, moving the Buckeyes to the Michigan 24-yard line, allowing Drew Basil to kick the 41-yard field goal and give Ohio State the 10–7 lead. The Wolverines were able to score a touchdown on their first possession of the second quarter, on a Gardner run, switching the lead to Michigan for the first time at 14–10. The Wolverine defense stopped the Buckeyes on their next possession, however, they could not get anything going on their next offensive drive. Towards the end of the second quarter, Ohio State drove 59 yards with Miller completing a touchdown pass to Corey Brown, giving Ohio State the 17–14 lead. Michigan responded quickly with Robinson scoring his first touchdown of the day on a 67-yard run and giving Michigan the lead once again. A Drew Basil field goal in the waning seconds of the first half closed the score, but the Wolverines still led at half time 21–20.

Michigan opened the second half with the ball on offense, but were unable to convert on fourth down and turned the ball over to the Buckeyes at midfield. Ohio State was unable to get into the endzone on the ensuing drive, but were able to take the lead back from the Wolverines on a Drew Basil field goal, making the score 23–21 in favor of the Buckeyes. Robinson fumbled the ball on Michigan's next offensive drive and gave the Buckeyes the ball in Wolverine territory, however, the drive would end in a Basil missed field goal. The two defenses continued to battle into the fourth quarter with both teams struggling to get any momentum on offense. Ohio State scored their final points of the game midway through the fourth on a 25-yard Basil field goal, giving the Buckeyes a 26–21 lead. Michigan continued to battle on their next offensive drive, being down only one possession, but a Gardner interception with 4:50 to play sealed the victory for the Buckeyes. The Ohio State defense would not allow the Wolverines to cross the 50-yard line the entire second half. Head coach Urban Meyer would call a timeout with 1:26 remaining in the game to allow the crowd and players to soak in the victory and the perfect season, even commenting after the game that, "this is a great team."

Ohio State beat Michigan 26–21 and ensured that the Wolverines would not win consecutive games in the rivalry for the first time since 2000, nor would the Wolverines have a share of the Legends Division title (though Nebraska would have held the tie-breaker to play in the conference championship game). The win also completed the undefeated season for the Buckeyes, going 12–0 overall and 8–0 in the Big Ten. This was the first undefeated season for the Buckeyes since 2002, the tenth overall, and the sixth unbeaten and untied season for the program. The game made Urban Meyer the most successful first-year head coach in Buckeyes history since Carroll Widdoes in 1944. Braxton Miller passed for 189 yard on the day, with Carlos Hyde leading the team in rushing yards with 146 yards. Gardner threw for 117 yards, while Robinson led the team in rushing with 122 yards. Ohio State was ineligible for the BCS or the Coaches Poll national championship, but was still eligible for the AP Poll national championship. However, the Buckeyes fell behind the BCS national champion Alabama Crimson Tide and the second-ranked Oregon Ducks to finish the season ranked third.

== Rankings ==
Entering the 2012 season, the Buckeyes were ranked No. 18 in the AP Preseason Poll, while they were ineligible for the Coaches' Poll, due to NCAA sanctions. After Ohio State's 56–10 win over Miami (Ohio), they moved to No. 14 in the AP Poll. After the Buckeyes' 63–38 win over Nebraska, who was ranked No. 21, Ohio State moved into the top ten of the AP Poll at No. 8. The first BCS Standings of the season came out on October 14, however, like the Coaches' Poll, the Buckeyes were ineligible for either the BCS Standings or Harris Poll. The Buckeyes' 29–22 overtime victory over Purdue would drop Ohio State from No. 7 to No. 9. Entering their final game with Michigan, the Buckeyes were ranked No. 4 in the AP Poll, with the 26–21 victory moving them to No. 3 the final poll of the regular season. Though they were not eligible, many projected that Ohio State would have been ranked No. 3 in the final BCS standings, behind Alabama and Notre Dame at the end of the regular season. Ohio State was still eligible for the AP National Championship, which is separate from the BCS National Championship Game. Though Notre Dame's loss in the National Championship Game left Ohio State as the only undefeated team in the Division I Football Subdivision, they were behind the national champion Alabama Crimson Tide and the Oregon Ducks. Ohio State finished the 2012 season ranked No. 3 in the final AP Poll.

Ranking movement Legend: ██ Increase in ranking. ██ Decrease in ranking. NR = Not ranked. RV = Received votes. ( ) = First place votes.
	Week															
Poll	Pre	1	2	3	4	5	6	7	8	9	10	11	12	13	14	Final
AP	18	14	12	16	14	12	8	7	9	6	5 т	6	4	4	3	3
Coaches'	Ineligible for ranking															
Harris	Not released						Ineligible for ranking									Not released
BCS	Not released							Ineligible for ranking								Not released

== After the season ==
After the victory over Michigan, Ohio State fans celebrated the perfect season with a ceremony at St. John Arena on December 7. Thousands attended the rally, which featured the Ohio State University Marching Band, as well as comments from Gordon Gee, Urban Meyer and many of the seniors. Former Heisman Trophy winner Troy Smith presented the team with the Big Ten Leaders Division Championship trophy.

=== Final statistics ===
After their victory of Michigan in the final regular season game, Ohio State's final team statistics were released. On the defensive side of the ball, Ohio State ranked 31st in scoring defense (22.83 points per game), 34th in total defense (359.58 yards per game), fourteenth in rushing defense (116.08 yards per game) and 76th in pass defense (243.50 yards per game). In conference, Ohio State ranked second in rushing defense and eleventh in passing defense. Ohio State ranked second in the nation in total defense during the month of November. On the offensive side of the ball, Ohio State ranked 21st in scoring offense (37.17 points per game), 47th in total offense (423.75 yards per game), tenth in rushing offense (242.25 yards per game) and 101st in passing offense (181.50 yards per game). In conference, Ohio State ranked second in rushing offense and eighth in passing offense.

=== Awards ===
In the weeks following the conclusion of the regular season, multiple Ohio State players were honored for their on-field performances with a variety of awards and recognition. The Big Ten recognized several players for their individual performances with various awards. Quarterback Braxton Miller, guard Andrew Norwell, defensive lineman John Simon, linebacker Ryan Shazier, and cornerbacks Bradley Roby and Travis Howard were all named to the Media All-Big Ten First Team. Running back Carlos Hyde, tackle Jack Mewhort and defensive tackle Johnathan Hankins were all named to the Media All-Big Ten Second Team. Defensive backs C.J. Barnett, Corey Brown and Christian Bryant, offensive linemen Reid Fragel and Corey Linsley, and linebacker Etienne Sabino were all named Media All-Big Ten Honorable Mention. Three players were named to the Coaches' All-Big Ten First Team including Hankins, John Simon and Bradley Roby. Braxton Miller, Carlos Hyde, wide receiver Corey Brown, Ryan Shazier and Christian Bryant were named to the Coaches' All-Big Ten Second Team. Braxton Miller won the Big Ten Griese-Brees Quarterback of the Year award, with John Simon winning the Big Ten Smith-Brown Defensive Lineman of the Year award.

In addition to the conference awards, several players were also named to various All-American Teams. Johnathan Hankins and Bradley Roby were named to the AP All-American Second Team, while John Simon was named to the AP All-American Third Team. Hankins was named to the All-American First Team by Scout.com, while Bradley Roby was named to the All-American First Team by ESPN. Many Ohio State players were also award finalists, including Braxton Miller, who was a finalist for the Manning Award and John Simon, who was a finalist for the Bowden Award. The coaching staff was also recognized for their achievements with head coach Urban Meyer being a finalist for the Football Writers Association of America coach of the year, Liberty Mutual Coach of the Year Award and Bear Bryant coach of the year. Buckeye offensive line coach E Warinner was also recognized by FootballScoop as the offensive line coach of the year. Several Buckeye players were invited to the many postseason All-Star games. Reid Fragel and John Simon were the two Buckeyes invited to the 2013 Senior Bowl, with Fragel pulling out and Simon playing for the North Team. Nathan Williams and Travis Howard were the only Buckeyes that participated in the 2013 East–West Shrine Game, while safety Orhian Johnson represented Ohio State in the NFLPA Collegiate Bowl.

=== NFL draft ===
Ten players from Ohio State were entered into the NFL Draft, nine seniors and one underclassmen. On defense, Johnathan Hankins, John Simon, Etienne Sabino, Travis Howard, Nathan Williams, Orhian Johnson and Garrett Goebel all entered. Hankins, the only junior from Ohio State in the draft, was projected to be drafted in the first round. Simon was projected to be selected in the third round, with Sabino and Howard projected to go around the fifth round. On offense, Reid Fragel, Jake Stoneburner and Zach Boren were all entered. Stoneburner and Boren were both expected to be selected late in the sixth or seventh round. In February 2013, seven Ohio State players were invited to the NFL Combine, including Johnathan Hankins, Nate Williams, Etienne Sabino, Zach Boren, Reid Fragel, Jake Stoneburner and John Simon.

Overall, three Buckeyes were selected during the draft. Hankins was selected in the second round by the New York Giants, Simon was selected in the fourth round by the Baltimore Ravens and Fragel was selected in the seventh round by the Cincinnati Bengals.
