= Zach Boren =

American football player (born 1991)

Profile
- Position: Fullback

Personal information
- Born: May 13, 1991 (age 35); Pickerington, Ohio, U.S.
- Listed height: 6 ft 0 in (1.83 m)
- Listed weight: 255 lb (116 kg)

Career information
- High school: Pickerington Central
- College: Ohio State
- NFL draft: 2013: undrafted

Career history
- Houston Texans (2013)*; San Diego Chargers (2014)*; Tennessee Titans (2015)*
- * Offseason or practice squad member only
- Stats at Pro Football Reference

Zach Boren (born May 13, 1991) is an American former professional football fullback. He played college football for Ohio State. Boren originally played fullback, but was converted to linebacker midway through his senior season.

== Early life ==
Boren was born in Pickerington, Ohio, and is Jewish. He attended Pickerington High School Central in Pickerington where he played football and baseball. As a baseball player, Boren was ranked number two in the state of Ohio, but chose to attend Ohio State to play football joining his brother Justin, who had recently transferred to the Buckeyes from arch-rival Michigan. As a football player, he achieved all-state accolades.

== College career ==
In his first three seasons with the Ohio State Buckeyes, Boren started 27 games at fullback. He began the 2012 season there, but prior to Ohio State's game against the Indiana Hoosiers, Boren was moved to linebacker by the Ohio State coaching staff. He played linebacker for the remainder of the season, amassing 50 tackles, a sack, a forced fumble, and a fumble recovery.

The 2012 Ohio State squad, for whom Boren was a captain, would have been eligible for a Bowl Championship Series (BCS) Bowl, possibly even the national championship, but due to sanctions levied against them by the National Collegiate Athletic Association (NCAA) were not bowl-eligible. He was named to the Jewish Sports Review 2012 College Football All-America Team.

== Professional career ==
Pre-draft measurables
Height	Weight	Arm length	Hand span	Wingspan	40-yard dash	10-yard split	20-yard split	20-yard shuttle	Three-cone drill	Vertical jump	Broad jump	Bench press
5 ft 11 1/2 in (1.82 m)	238 lb (108 kg)	31 1/2 in (0.80 m)	10 in (0.25 m)	6 ft 1 1/2 in (1.87 m)	4.98 s	1.63 s	2.86 s	4.44 s	7.28 s	32.0 in (0.81 m)	9 ft 1 in (2.77 m)	25 reps
All values from NFL Combine/Pro Day

=== Houston Texans ===
On April 27, 2013, he signed with the Houston Texans as an undrafted free agent following the 2013 NFL draft. He was released on August 27, 2013.

=== San Diego Chargers ===
On January 7, 2014, Boren signed a reserves/futures contract with the San Diego Chargers. The Chargers released Boren on August 25, 2014.

=== Tennessee Titans ===
On August 7, 2015, Boren was signed by the Tennessee Titans and released injured fullback Connor Neighbors. Boren was later released by the Titans.

== Personal life ==
Boren was raised in a sports-inclined family. His father Mike played linebacker at Michigan under Bo Schembechler in the 1980s, his mother Hope ran track at Michigan, and his older brother Justin, and younger brother Jacoby are both former Ohio State teammates. He attributes much of his success at Ohio State to the family atmosphere that coach Urban Meyer promotes.

== See also ==
- List of select Jewish football players
