= Jake Stoneburner =

American football player (born 1989)

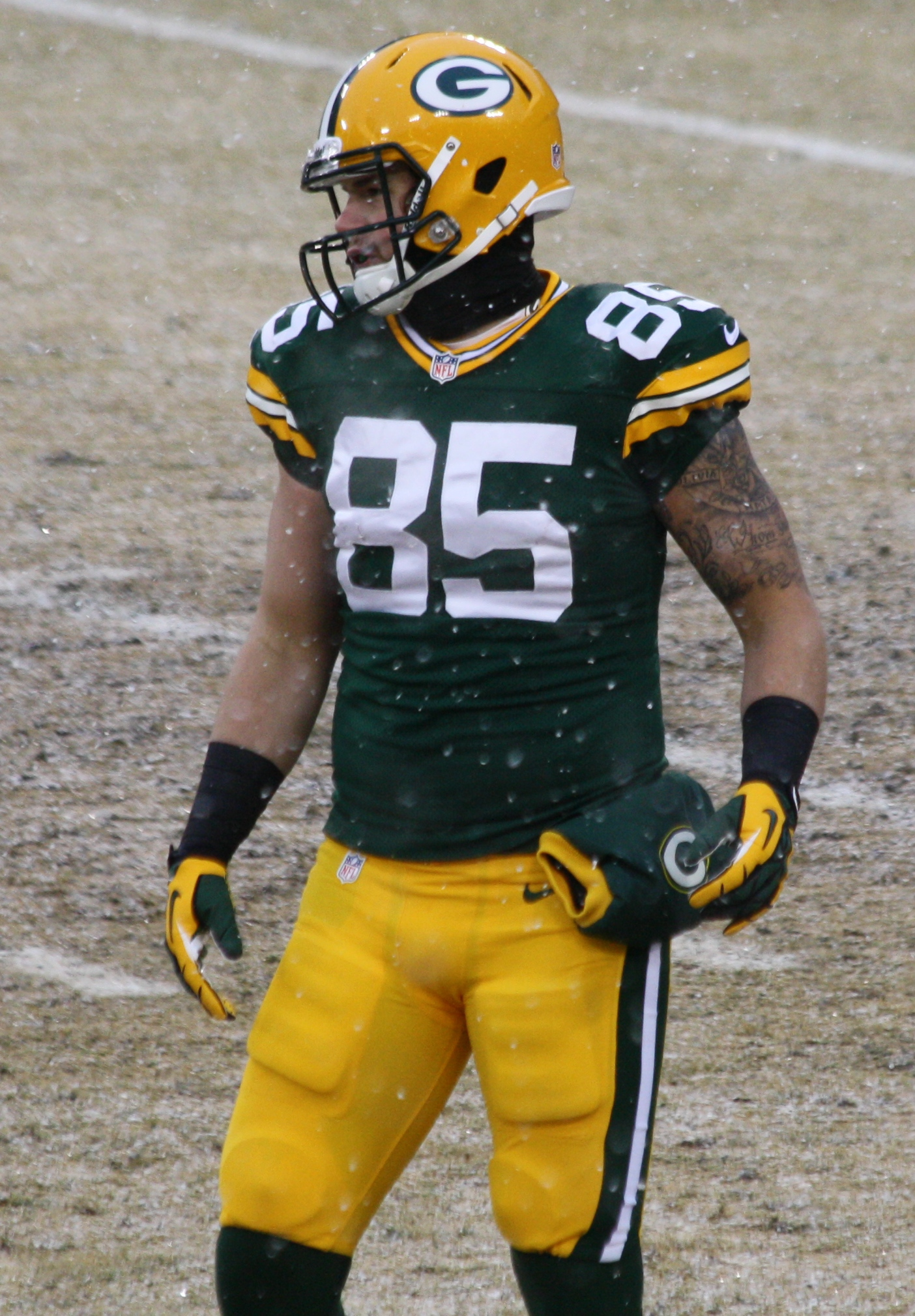
- Stoneburner with the Packers in 2013

No. 85, 86, 49
- Position: Tight end

Personal information
- Born: August 25, 1989 (age 37); Columbus, Ohio, U.S.
- Listed height: 6 ft 3 in (1.91 m)
- Listed weight: 249 lb (113 kg)

Career information
- High school: Dublin (OH) Coffman
- College: Ohio State
- NFL draft: 2013: undrafted

Career history
- Green Bay Packers (2013); Miami Dolphins (2014–2015); Los Angeles Rams (2016)*; New Orleans Saints (2016–2017)*
- * Offseason or practice squad member only

Career NFL statistics
- Receptions: 5
- Receiving yards: 47
- Receiving touchdowns: 2
- Stats at Pro Football Reference

Jacob Charles Stoneburner (born August 25, 1989) is an American former professional football player who was a tight end in the National Football League (NFL). He played college football at Ohio State. He was signed as an undrafted free agent by the Green Bay Packers.

== Early life ==
Stoneburner attended Dublin Coffman High School. As a senior, he recorded 74 receptions for 1,267 yards and 15 touchdowns. He was an All-Ohio Capital Conference, All-district, All-Metro and All-state selection. For his high school career, he recorded 168 receptions for 2,751 yards and 28 touchdowns and was a two-time All-state selection. He was also a U.S. Army All-American Bowl selection as well as a selection for the Big 33 Football Classic. He also lettered in basketball and track & field.

== College career ==
After high school, Stoneburner attended Ohio State University where he majored in family resource management.

In 2008, he redshirted as a true freshman. As a redshirt freshman in 2009, he appeared in all 13 games as a back-up to Jake Ballard. As a redshirt sophomore in 2010, Stoneburner appeared in 11 games, starting five. He recorded 21 receptions for 222 yards (10. avg.) and two touchdowns. In 2011 as a redshirt junior he appeared in 12 games, starting 10. He recorded 14 receptions for 193 yards (13.8 avg.) and seven touchdowns. In 2012, he switched from tight end to H-back and appeared in 12 games, with eight starts. He recorded 16 receptions for 269 yards (16.8 avg.) and four touchdowns.

For his career at Ohio State, he recorded 53 receptions for 714 yards (13.5 avg.) and 13 touchdowns. He has the career record for touchdown receptions by a tight end at Ohio State.

== Professional career ==
Pre-draft measurables
| Height | Weight | Arm length | Hand span | 40-yard dash | 10-yard split | 20-yard split | 20-yard shuttle | Three-cone drill | Vertical jump | Broad jump | Bench press |
|---|---|---|---|---|---|---|---|---|---|---|---|
| 6 ft 3 in (1.91 m) | 252 lb (114 kg) | 34 1/4 in (0.87 m) | 9 3/8 in (0.24 m) | 4.65 s | 1.64 s | 2.71 s | 4.27 s | 7.12 s | 34 1/2 in (0.88 m) | 9 ft 8 in (2.95 m) | 18 reps |
All values from NFL Scouting Combine.

=== Green Bay Packers ===
After going undrafted in the 2013 NFL draft, Stoneburner signed with the Green Bay Packers on April 27, 2013. On August 31, he was released by the Packers. He was later signed to the Packers practice squad. On October 15, 2013, he was promoted to the active squad. As a rookie, he appeared in nine games for the Packers recording one special teams tackle against the Minnesota Vikings.

=== Miami Dolphins ===
Stoneburner signed to the Miami Dolphins practice squad on November 4, 2014. The next month, the Dolphins signed him to a Reserve/Futures contract. On September 6, 2015, he was re-signed to the Dolphins practice squad. On September 14, 2015, Stoneburner was signed to the active roster after tight end Dion Sims suffered a concussion. While on the active roster, he appeared in 11 games, with one start. He recorded five receptions for 47 yards and two touchdowns. On July 30, 2016, Stoneburner was waived.

=== Los Angeles Rams ===
On August 4, 2016, Stoneburner was signed by the Rams. On August 30, he was released by the Rams.

=== New Orleans Saints ===
On September 14, 2016, Stoneburner was signed to the New Orleans Saints' practice squad. He signed a reserve/future contract with the Saints on January 2, 2017. He was waived by the Saints on May 8, 2017.

=== Statistics ===
| Season | | | | Receiving | | | | | | Rushing | | | | | Fumbles | |
| Year | Team | GP | GS | Tgt | Rec | Yds | Avg | TD | Lng | Att | Yds | Avg | Lng | TD | Fum | Lost |
|---|---|---|---|---|---|---|---|---|---|---|---|---|---|---|---|---|
| 2013 | GB | 9 | 0 | -- | 0 | 0 | 0 | 0 | 0 | 0 | 0 | 0.0 | 0 | 0 | 0 | 0 |
| 2014 | MIA | -- | -- | -- | -- | -- | -- | -- | -- | -- | -- | -- | -- | -- | -- | -- |
| 2015 | MIA | 11 | 1 | -- | 5 | 47 | 9.4 | 2 | 13 | 0 | 0 | 0.0 | 0 | 0 | 0 | 0 |
| Career | | 20 | 1 | - | 5 | 47 | 9.4 | 2 | 13 | 0 | 0 | 0.0 | 0 | 0 | 0 | 0 |

== Personal life ==
Stoneburner is the son of Cathy and Mark Stoneburner and the oldest of four kids.
