= Etienne Sabino =

American football player (born 1990)

Profile
- Position: Linebacker

Personal information
- Born: November 13, 1990 (age 35); Manhattan, New York
- Listed height: 6 ft 2 in (1.88 m)
- Listed weight: 247 lb (112 kg)

Career information
- High school: Miami (FL) Krop
- College: Ohio State
- NFL draft: 2013: undrafted

Career history
- New York Giants (2013)*; St. Louis Rams (2014)*
- * Offseason or practice squad member only
- Stats at Pro Football Reference

Etienne Sabino (born November 13, 1990) is an American former football linebacker. He was signed by the Giants as an undrafted free agent in 2013. He played college football at Ohio State University. He has also played for the St. Louis Rams. Sabino's roots are in the Dominican Republic via his parents.

== High school career ==
Sabino attended Dr. Michael M. Krop High School in Miami, Florida, where was recorded 146 tackles, seven sacks, five forced fumbles, and one interception as a senior. He received first-team all-Florida and all-Dade County honors in 2007. Sabino finished his junior season with 131 tackles and eight sacks.

He participated in the U.S. Army All-American Bowl and earned an All-American selection by EA Sports. Considered a four-star recruit by Rivals.com, Sabino was ranked the No. 1 inside linebacker prospect in the nation. He chose Ohio State over Florida and USC.

== College career ==
As a true freshman, Sabino backed up three-time All-American James Laurinaitis in 2008. He returned a blocked punt 20 yards for a touchdown against Purdue. Sabino, alongside senior Austin Spitler, competed for the middle linebacker spot that became vacant following Laurinaitis' graduation. Sabino redshirted his junior year and started during the 2011 season.

== Professional career ==
=== New York Giants ===
On April 27, 2013, Sabino was signed as an undrafted free agent by the New York Giants. On August 25, 2013, he was cut by the Giants. In September, he worked out for the Cincinnati Bengals, but was not signed.

=== St. Louis Rams ===
Sabino was signed by the St. Louis Rams on March 25, 2014. He was waived during final cuts on August 29, 2014.

== Personal life ==
Sabino was born in Manhattan, but moved to Miami with his family in the fourth grade.
