= 2012 Indiana Hoosiers football team =

American college football season

2012 Indiana Hoosiers football
- Conference: Big Ten Conference
- Leaders Division
- Record: 4–8 (2–6 Big Ten)
- Head coach: Kevin Wilson (2nd season)
- Co-offensive coordinators: Kevin Johns (2nd season); Seth Littrell (1st season)
- Offensive scheme: Multiple
- Co-defensive coordinators: Mike Ekeler (2nd season); Doug Mallory (2nd season)
- Base defense: 4–3
- MVP: Adam Replogle
- Captains: Will Matte; Adam Replogle
- Home stadium: Memorial Stadium

2012 Big Ten Conference football standings
	Conf.			Overall
Team	W		L	W		L
Legends Division
No. 25 Nebraska xy	7	–	1	10	–	4
No. 24 Michigan	6	–	2	8	–	5
No. 17 Northwestern	5	–	3	10	–	3
Michigan State	3	–	5	7	–	6
Iowa	2	–	6	4	–	8
Minnesota	2	–	6	6	–	7
Leaders Division
No. 3 Ohio State* x	8	–	0	12	–	0
Penn State*	6	–	2	8	–	4
Wisconsin y$	4	–	4	8	–	6
Purdue	3	–	5	6	–	7
Indiana	2	–	6	4	–	8
Illinois	0	–	8	2	–	10
Championship: Wisconsin 70, Nebraska 31
$ – BCS representative as conference champion; x – Division champion/co-champions; * Ohio State and Penn State ineligible for conference championship game and post-season bowl games due to NCAA sanctions.; Rankings from AP Poll

The 2012 Indiana Hoosiers football team represented Indiana University Bloomington during the 2012 NCAA Division I FBS football season. The Hoosiers competed in the Leaders Division of the Big Ten Conference and played their home games at Memorial Stadium in Bloomington, Indiana. The team was led by head coach Kevin Wilson, who was in his second season. They finished the season 4–8, 2–6 in Big Ten play to place fifth in the Leaders Division.

== Preseason ==
=== Recruits ===
College recruiting information (2012)
Name	Hometown	School	Height	Weight	40^{‡}	Commit date
Jacarri Alexander; LB	Winter Haven, Florida	Iowa Central CC	6 ft 1 in (1.85 m)	234 lb (106 kg)	4.6	Sep 27, 2011
Jacarri Alexander; LB	Recruit ratings: Scout: Rivals: (JC)					
Jacob Bailey; OL	Carmel, Indiana	Cathedral	6 ft 5 in (1.96 m)	285 lb (129 kg)	4.6	Jul 1, 2011
Jacob Bailey; OL	Recruit ratings: Scout: Rivals: (76)					
Dimitric Camiel; OL	Houston, Texas	Westfield	6 ft 7 in (2.01 m)	300 lb (140 kg)	4.6	Jan 30, 2012
Dimitric Camiel; OL	Recruit ratings: Scout: Rivals: (45)					
Cameron Coffman; QB	Peculiar, Missouri	Arizona Western College	6 ft 2 in (1.88 m)	191 lb (87 kg)	--	Jan 12, 2012
Cameron Coffman; QB	Recruit ratings: Scout: Rivals: (JC)					
Tevin Coleman; RB	Oak Forest, Illinois	Oak Forest	6 ft 1 in (1.85 m)	202 lb (92 kg)	--	Jan 9, 2012
Tevin Coleman; RB	Recruit ratings: Scout: Rivals: (75)					
David Cooper; ILB	Coffeyville, Kansas	Coffeyville CC	6 ft 1 in (1.85 m)	230 lb (100 kg)	--	Dec 21, 2011
David Cooper; ILB	Recruit ratings: Scout: Rivals: (JC)					
Caleb Cornett; WR	Indianapolis, Indiana	Ben Davis	6 ft 3 in (1.91 m)	175 lb (79 kg)	4.55	Jun 22, 2011
Caleb Cornett; WR	Recruit ratings: Scout: Rivals: (70)					
Kevin Davis; WR	Indianapolis, Indiana	Warren Central	5 ft 11 in (1.80 m)	175 lb (79 kg)	4.49	Jun 23, 2011
Kevin Davis; WR	Recruit ratings: Scout: Rivals: (77)					
Dan Feeney; G	Orland Park, Illinois	Sandburg	6 ft 4 in (1.93 m)	302 lb (137 kg)	--	Jun 19, 2011
Dan Feeney; G	Recruit ratings: Scout: Rivals: (77)					
Dawson Fletcher; S	West Chester, Ohio	Lakota West	6 ft 0 in (1.83 m)	190 lb (86 kg)	4.5	Jun 20, 2011
Dawson Fletcher; S	Recruit ratings: Scout: Rivals: (72)					
Ralphael Green; DT	San Antonio, Texas	Sam Houston	6 ft 5 in (1.96 m)	320 lb (150 kg)	--	Dec 11, 2011
Ralphael Green; DT	Recruit ratings: Scout: Rivals: (71)					
Shawn Heffern; DE	Carmel, Indiana	Carmel	6 ft 6 in (1.98 m)	245 lb (111 kg)	--	Aug 8, 2011
Shawn Heffern; DE	Recruit ratings: Scout: Rivals: (75)					
Ricky Jones; WR	Sarasota, Florida	Booker	5 ft 10 in (1.78 m)	170 lb (77 kg)	--	Jan 24, 2012
Ricky Jones; WR	Recruit ratings: Scout: Rivals: (76)					
Tanner Kearns; TE	Lexington, Ohio	Lexington	6 ft 5 in (1.96 m)	225 lb (102 kg)	--	Jun 25, 2011
Tanner Kearns; TE	Recruit ratings: Scout: Rivals: (74)					
Adam Kranda; DE	New Castle, Indiana	New Castle Chrysler	6 ft 6 in (1.98 m)	240 lb (110 kg)	--	Jun 28, 2011
Adam Kranda; DE	Recruit ratings: Scout: Rivals: (75)					
Nick Mangieri; DE	Dunlap, Illinois	Dunlap	6 ft 5 in (1.96 m)	240 lb (110 kg)	4.7	Jun 16, 2011
Nick Mangieri; DE	Recruit ratings: Scout: Rivals: (77)					
Antonio Marshall; CB	Milledgeville, Georgia	Georgia Military College	5 ft 11 in (1.80 m)	190 lb (86 kg)	--	Dec 22, 2011
Antonio Marshall; CB	Recruit ratings: Scout: Rivals: (JC)					
Justin Rayside; DE	Riverside, California	Riverside CC	6 ft 3 in (1.91 m)	246 lb (112 kg)	4.7	Dec 12, 2011
Justin Rayside; DE	Recruit ratings: Scout: Rivals: (JC)					
Wes Rogers; C	Indianapolis, Indiana	Lawrence Central	6 ft 4 in (1.93 m)	285 lb (129 kg)	5.2	Jul 10, 2011
Wes Rogers; C	Recruit ratings: Scout: Rivals: (75)					
Jason Spriggs; TE	Elkhart, Indiana	Concord	6 ft 7 in (2.01 m)	265 lb (120 kg)	--	Jun 28, 2011
Jason Spriggs; TE	Recruit ratings: Scout: Rivals: (75)					
Nathan Sudfeld; QB	Modesto, California	Modesto Christian	6 ft 5 in (1.96 m)	215 lb (98 kg)	--	Jan 25, 2012
Nathan Sudfeld; QB	Recruit ratings: Scout: Rivals: (80)					
Ryan Thompson; S	Fulton, Mississippi	Itawamba CC	5 ft 10 in (1.78 m)	186 lb (84 kg)	--	Dec 19, 2011
Ryan Thompson; S	Recruit ratings: Scout: Rivals: (JC)					
Alex Todd; DT	Streetsboro, Ohio	Streetsboro	6 ft 3 in (1.91 m)	285 lb (129 kg)	--	Jun 12, 2011
Alex Todd; DT	Recruit ratings: Scout: Rivals: (74)					
Jordan Wallace; LB	Indianapolis, Indiana	Warren Central	6 ft 0 in (1.83 m)	230 lb (100 kg)	4.7	Jun 23, 2011
Jordan Wallace; LB	Recruit ratings: Scout: Rivals: (77)					
Tregg Waters; S	Glendale, Arizona	Glendale CC	6 ft 0 in (1.83 m)	185 lb (84 kg)	4.48	Nov 16, 2011
Tregg Waters; S	Recruit ratings: Scout: Rivals: (JC)					
Overall recruit ranking: ESPN: NR
Note: In many cases, Scout, Rivals, 247Sports, On3, and ESPN may conflict in their listings of height and weight.; In these cases, the average was taken. ESPN grades are on a 100-point scale.; Sources: "2012 Team Ranking". Rivals.com.

== Schedule ==
Date	Time	Opponent	Site	TV	Result	Attendance
September 1	8:00 pm	No. 23 (FCS) Indiana State*	Memorial Stadium; Bloomington, IN	BTN	W 24–17	41,882
September 8	3:30 pm	at UMass*	Gillette Stadium; Foxborough, MA	ESPN3	W 45–6	16,304
September 15	8:00 pm	Ball State*	Memorial Stadium; Bloomington, IN	BTN	L 39–41	48,186
September 29	12:00 pm	at Northwestern	Ryan Field; Evanston, IL	BTN	L 29–44	33,129
October 6	12:00 pm	Michigan State^{†}	Memorial Stadium; Bloomington, IN (rivalry)	BTN	L 27–31	45,979
October 13	8:00 pm	No. 8 Ohio State	Memorial Stadium; Bloomington, IN	BTN	L 49–52	48,880
October 20	3:30 pm	at Navy*	Navy–Marine Corps Memorial Stadium; Annapolis, MD	CBSSN	L 30–31	33,441
October 27	12:00 pm	at Illinois	Memorial Stadium; Champaign, IL (rivalry)	BTN	W 31–17	47,981
November 3	3:30 pm	Iowa	Memorial Stadium; Bloomington, IN	BTN	W 24–21	40,646
November 10	12:00 pm	Wisconsin	Memorial Stadium; Bloomington, IN	ESPN2	L 14–62	43,240
November 17	12:00 pm	at Penn State	Beaver Stadium; University Park, PA	BTN	L 22–45	90,358
November 24	12:00 pm	at Purdue	Ross–Ade Stadium; West Lafayette, IN (Old Oaken Bucket)	BTN	L 35–56	42,638
*Non-conference game; ^{†}Homecoming; Rankings from AP Poll released prior to the game; All times are in Eastern time

== Roster ==
(as of November 24, 2012)
Quarterbacks: 2 Cameron Coffman – Sophomore; 3 David Nelson - Freshman; 4 Corey Babb - Freshman; 5 Tre Roberson – Sophomore; 7 Nate Sudfeld - Freshman; 9 Nate Boudreau - Freshman; 16 Tyler Brady - Freshman; 17 Max Matthews – (redshirt) Freshman; Wide receivers: 1 Shane Wynn – Sophomore; 3 Cody Latimer – Sophomore; 8 Kevin Davis - Freshman; 10 Ricky Jones - Freshman; 13 Kofi Hughes – Junior; 14 Nick Stoner - Sophomore; 19 Ryan Parker – Sophomore; 23 Blair Stellhorn – Freshman; 24 Andre Booker – Freshman; 26 Chandler Miller – Freshman; 80 Sean Damaska – Freshman; 81 Duwyce Wilson – (redshirt) Junior; 84 Jamonne Chester – (redshirt) Sophomore; 87 Mitchell Paige – Freshman; Offensive line: 50 Jake Reed – Sophomore; 54 Alez Ziedas – Freshman; 57 Pete Bachman – (redshirt) Sophomore; 59 Peyton Eckert – Sophomore; 60 Will Matte – (redshirt) Senior; 62 Ralston Evans – (redshirt) Freshman; 63 Tyler Lukens – (redshirt) Freshman; 64 Collin Rahrig – (redshirt) Sophomore; 65 Wes Rogers – Freshman; 67 Dan Feeney - Freshman; 68 David Kaminiski – Sophomore; 70 Jacob Bailey - Freshman; 71 Bill Ivan – (redshirt) Sophomore; 73 Bernard Taylor – Sophomore; 74 Charlie Chapman – (redshirt) Junior; 76 Cody Evers – (redshirt) Sophomore; 77 Dimitric Camiel – Freshman; 78 Jason Spriggs – Freshman; 79 Gregory Lewis – (redshirt) Freshman	Running backs: 6 Tevin Coleman - Freshman; 12 Stephen Houston – (redshirt) Junior; 15 Damon Graham - Freshman; 20 D'Angelo Roberts – Sophomore; 24 Matt Perez – (redshirt) Sophomore; 25 David Blackwell – (redshirt) Junior; 28 Anthony Davis – Sophomore; 38 Isaiah Roundtree – (redshirt) Sophomore; 44 Andrew Wilson - Freshman; Fullbacks: 40 Matt Zakrzewski – (redshirt) Sophomore; 45 Dimitrius Carr-Watson – (redshirt) Junior; 89 Mike Carter – (redshirt) Junior; Tight ends: 29 Jordan Jackson – (redshirt) Freshman; 33 Christian Englum - Freshman; 41 Tanner Kearns - Freshman; 83 Ted Bolser – (redshirt) Junior; 85 Charles Love III – (redshirt) Senior; 86 Paul Phillips – (redshirt) Sophomore; 88 Anthony Corsaro - Freshman	Defensive line: 25 Ryan Phillis – (redshirt) Sophomore; 33 Zach Shaw – (redshirt) Freshman; 44 Adam Kranda - Freshman; 46 Mike Replogle – Sophomore; 53 Shawn Heffern - Freshman; 56 Nick Mangieri - Freshman; 58 Tyler McGuigan – (redshirt) Junior; 63 Jerrell Kirlew – (redshirt) Senior; 69 Alex Todd - Freshman; 72 Michael Mitsch - Freshman; 75 Nicholas Sliger – (redshirt) Senior; 87 Leneil Himes – (redshirt) Sophomore; 90 Garrett Libertowski - (redshirt) Freshman; 92 Justin Rayside – Junior; 93 Ralphael Green - Freshman; 94 Javon Cornley – (redshirt) Junior; 95 Bobby Richardson – Sophomore; 96 John Laihinen – (redshirt) Sophomore; 97 Larry Black Jr. – (redshirt) Senior; 98 Adam Replogle – Senior; 99 Adarius Rayner – (redshirt) Freshman; Linebackers: 4 Forisse Hardin – Sophomore; 30 Tyler Burgett - Freshman; 31 Jordan Wallace - Freshman; 34 Jacarri Alexander – (redshirt) Junior; 40 Chase Parker - (redshirt) Freshman; 42 David Cooper – (redshirt) Sophomore; 43 Brandon Grubbe - (redshirt) Sophomore; 43 Ishmael Thomas – (redshirt) Sophomore; 47 Chase Hoobler – (redshirt) Sophomore; 48 Simeon Ikudabo - (redshirt) Freshman; 49 Griffen Dahlstrom – (redshirt) Junior; 51 Kyle Kennedy – (redshirt) Freshman; 52 Austin Schlosser - Freshman; 55 Jake Michalek – (redshirt) Sophomore; 61 Bryce Werskey - Freshman	Defensive backs: 2 Dareon Fuller - Sophomore; 7 Brian Williams – (redshirt) Sophomore; 8 Drew Hardin – (redshirt) Sophomore; 9 Greg Heban – (redshirt) Junior; 12 Mike Caponi - (redshirt) Freshman; 17 Michael Hunter – Sophomore; 18 Tregg Waters – Junior; 19 Ryan Thompson– Junior; 21 Jake Zupancic – (redshirt) Sophomore; 22 Kenny Mullen – Sophomore; 23 Lawrence Barnett – (redshirt) Junior; 24 David Calhoun – Freshman; 26 Justin Nowak – (redshirt) Sophomore; 27 Alexander Webb – (redshirt) Senior; 28 Antonio Marshall – (redshirt) Junior; 29 Dawson Fletcher - Freshman; 31 Tyler Reeves - (redshirt) Sophomore; 35 Quai Chandler - Freshman; 36 Tim Bennett - Sophomore; 37 Mark Murphy – Sophomore; 38 Garrett Welch - Freshman; Punters: 15 Marcus Kinsella - Freshman; 30 Nathan Reisman – (redshirt) Junior; 42 Chad Roggeman – (redshirt) Junior; 93 Nick Campos - Freshman; Place kickers: 16 Mitch Ewald – (redshirt) Junior; 35 Mitchell Voss - (redshirt) Junior; 36 Erich Toth - (redshirt) Freshman; 99 Nick Freeland - (redshirt) Senior; Long snappers: 82 Sean Barrett - Freshman; 91 Matt Dooley – Sophomore
