= Raheem Mostert =

American football player (born 1992)

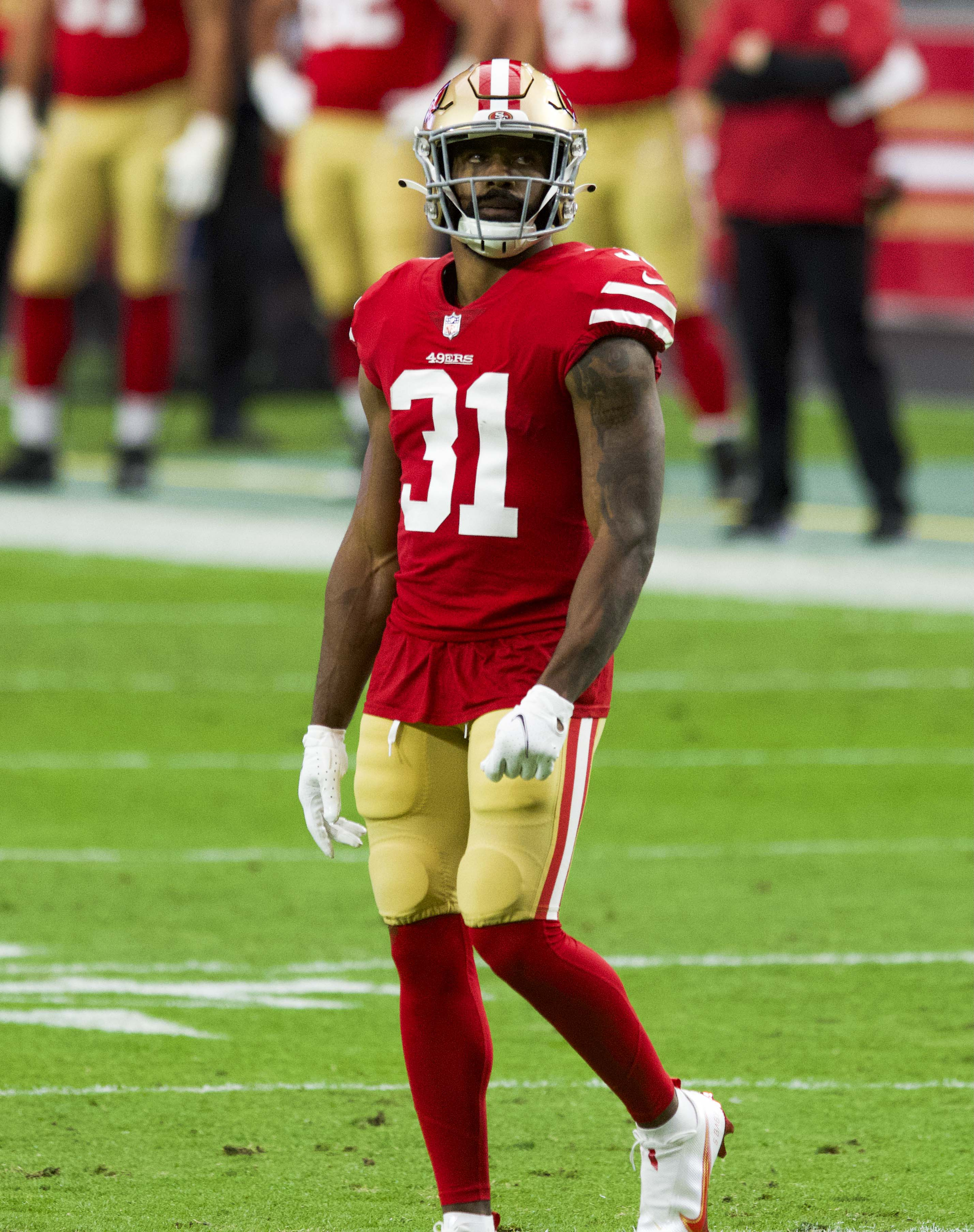
- Mostert with the San Francisco 49ers in 2020

Profile
- Positions: Running back, kickoff returner

Personal information
- Born: April 9, 1992 (age 34); New Smyrna Beach, Florida, U.S.
- Listed height: 5 ft 10 in (1.78 m)
- Listed weight: 212 lb (96 kg)

Career information
- High school: New Smyrna Beach
- College: Purdue (2011–2014)
- NFL draft: 2015: undrafted

Career history
- Philadelphia Eagles (2015)*; Miami Dolphins (2015); Baltimore Ravens (2015); Cleveland Browns (2015); New York Jets (2016)*; Chicago Bears (2016); San Francisco 49ers (2016–2021); Miami Dolphins (2022–2024); Las Vegas Raiders (2025)
- * Offseason or practice squad member only

Awards and highlights
- Pro Bowl (2023); NFL rushing touchdowns leader (2023); NFL records: Most rushing yards in a conference championship game: 220 (2019); Most rushing touchdowns in a conference championship game: 4 (2019)

Career NFL statistics as of 2025
- Rushing yards: 3,895
- Rushing average: 5.0
- Receptions: 123
- Receiving yards: 969
- Return yards: 1,879
- Total touchdowns: 42
- Stats at Pro Football Reference

Dominique Raheem Mostert (born April 9, 1992) is an American professional football running back. He played college football for the Purdue Boilermakers.

Mostert attended New Smyrna Beach High School in New Smyrna Beach, Florida, where he played football and competed in track and field. Mostert led New Smyrna Beach to two playoff berths. After his senior season, Mostert moved on to Purdue University after accepting a full scholarship.

In his first collegiate season, Mostert set a school record as he averaged 33.5 yards a return, capped off with a 99-yard touchdown return in the bowl game. He finished the season with seven returns of 39 or more yards, including an 81-yarder at Indiana and a 74-yarder at Wisconsin. Against the Badgers, Mostert racked up 206 yards on five kickoff returns to break 42-year-old school records for total yardage and average yards per return. He also led the nation in average yards per return.

During his NFL career, Mostert has played for eight teams. He appeared in Super Bowl LIV with the San Francisco 49ers and earned his first Pro Bowl selection in 2023 with the Miami Dolphins after leading the league in rushing touchdowns.

== Early life ==
Mostert attended New Smyrna Beach High School, in New Smyrna Beach, Florida, where he was a member of the football and track & field teams. As a football player under coach Lance Jenkins, Mostert returned nine kickoffs and a punt for touchdowns, in addition to having 39 receptions for 723 yards (18.5 average) and four touchdowns as a senior. He also recorded 81 tackles on defense. As a participant in the 2010 Central Florida All-Star Game, Mostert was named MVP after recording three receptions for nearly 100 yards and a 94-yard kick return touchdown. He also made an appearance in the Florida North vs. South football game.

As a track athlete under coach Brendan Robinson, Mostert was a standout sprinter, hurdler, and jumper. He won the 2010 FHSAA 3A District 6 title in the 300-meter hurdles. At the 2011 FHSAA 3A Outdoor State Finals, Mostert finished first in the 100 meters with a time of 10.68 seconds and placed fourth in the 300-meter hurdles with a personal-best time of 37.95 seconds.

Mostert committed to Purdue University on January 14, 2011. He chose Purdue over football scholarships from Indiana University, Marshall University, the University of Illinois, the United States Naval Academy, Rutgers University, the University of Miami, the University of Southern Mississippi, the University of Central Florida, and Wake Forest University.

College recruiting
Name	Hometown	School	Height	Weight	40^{‡}	Commit date
Raheem Mostert; WR	New Smyrna Beach, Florida	New Smyrna Beach High School	5 ft 11 in (1.80 m)	183 lb (83 kg)	–	Jan 14, 2011
Raheem Mostert; WR	Recruit ratings: Scout: Rivals:					
Overall recruit ranking: Scout: – (S) Rivals: – (WR), – (FL)
‡ Refers to 40-yard dash; Note: In many cases, Scout, Rivals, 247Sports, On3, and ESPN may conflict in their listings of height, weight and 40 time.; In these cases, the average was taken. ESPN grades are on a 100-point scale.; Sources: "2011 Team Ranking". Rivals.com.

== College career ==
Mostert attended and played college football at Purdue from 2011 to 2014. In his first collegiate season in 2011, Mostert set a school record as he averaged 33.5 yards a return, capped off with a 99-yard touchdown return in the 2011 Little Caesars Pizza Bowl against Western Michigan. He finished the season with seven returns of 39 or more yards, including an 81-yarder at Indiana and a 74-yarder at Wisconsin. Against the Badgers, Mostert racked up 206 yards on five kickoff returns to break 42-year-old school records for total yardage and average yards per return in a single game. (41.2) For his efforts against Wisconsin, Mostert was named the Big Ten Conference Freshman of the Week, becoming the first Purdue freshman to do it since Rob Henry in October 2010. Mostert's 837 kickoff return yards are the second best in school history for a single season. He is now ranked 13th on Purdue's career kickoff return yards.

In May 2012, Mostert was named to the preseason Jet Award watch list, an award given to the top return specialist in the NCAA. During spring practice, he was named a captain for the 2012 season. In the 2012 season, Mostert finished with 16 carries for 85 yards and a touchdown to go along with 18 kick returns for 463 yards.

In the 2013 season, Mostert finished with 11 carries for 37 yards to go along with 11 kick returns for 258 yards and a touchdown, which was a 100-yarder against Penn State.

Moster's role expanded in the 2014 season. He finished with 93 carries for 529 yards and three touchdowns to go along with 34 kick returns for 731 yards.

Mostert was also a member of the Purdue track team. At Purdue, he was coached by Lonnie Greene and Norbert Elliott in Track and Field. He was ranked by NFL.com as the fastest college football player in the NCAA, with only Oklahoma State wide receiver Tyreek Hill possessing a faster 100m time (9.98 s). Mostert took gold in both the 60 meters (6.63s) and 200 meters (20.73s) at the 2014 Big Ten Indoor Track and Field Championships. He qualified for the 2014 NCAA Division I Outdoor Track and Field Championships in the 100 meters (10.15s), 200 meters (20.65s) and as a member of 4×100-meter relay squad.

== Professional career ==
Pre-draft measurables
Height	Weight	Arm length	Hand span	40-yard dash	10-yard split	20-yard split	20-yard shuttle	Three-cone drill	Vertical jump	Broad jump	Bench press
5 ft 10 3/8 in (1.79 m)	195 lb (88 kg)	30 7/8 in (0.78 m)	9 1/8 in (0.23 m)	4.38 s	1.49 s	2.54 s	4.30 s	6.90 s	40.0 in (1.02 m)	11 ft 0 in (3.35 m)	20 reps
All values from Pro Day

=== Philadelphia Eagles ===
After going undrafted during the 2015 NFL draft, Mostert signed as an undrafted free agent with the Philadelphia Eagles. He had an excellent preseason; between his 157 rushing yards and 191 receiving yards, totaling for 348 yards, Mostert led the NFL in yards from the line of scrimmage in the preseason. He also added in five kick returns for 162 yards. Despite this effort, Mostert was cut on September 4 in preparation for the Eagles having to cut their roster down to 53, but was signed to the practice squad two days later.

=== Miami Dolphins (first stint) ===
On September 14, 2015, the Miami Dolphins signed Mostert off the Eagles' practice squad. He returned two kicks for 57 yards for the Dolphins during a Week 2 23–20 road loss to the Jacksonville Jaguars.

On October 13, Mostert was released by the Dolphins in hopes of moving him down to practice squad.

=== Baltimore Ravens ===
On October 14, 2015, Mostert was signed by the Baltimore Ravens after third-string running back Lorenzo Taliaferro suffered a season-ending foot injury. Mostert returned five kicks for 164 yards in seven games with the Ravens.

On December 15, Mostert was cut by the Ravens in hopes of putting him on practice squad, but Mostert did not clear waivers.

=== Cleveland Browns ===
On December 16, 2015, Mostert was claimed off waivers by the Cleveland Browns. He was named the starting kick returner for the final three games of the season and returned 12 kicks for 309 yards.

Mostert signed the Browns' one-year tender offer on March 7, 2016. On September 4, he was released to make room for players claimed off waivers.

=== New York Jets ===
On September 6, 2016, Mostert was signed to the New York Jets' practice squad. However, he was released six days later.

=== Chicago Bears ===
On September 13, 2016, Mostert was signed to the Chicago Bears' practice squad. Eight days later, he was elevated to the active roster. Mostert appeared in two games with the Bears in the 2016 season.

Mostert was released on October 3, but was re-signed to the practice squad the next day. He was released again on November 24.

=== San Francisco 49ers ===
==== 2016 season ====
On November 28, 2016, Mostert was signed to the San Francisco 49ers' practice squad. He was promoted to the active roster on December 31. Mostert played in the regular-season finale against the Seattle Seahawks the next day and finished the narrow 25–23 loss with 68 return yards and a six-yard rush.

==== 2017 season ====
On November 27, 2017, head coach Kyle Shanahan announced that Mostert was going to be placed on injured reserve with an MCL sprain. He finished the 2017 season with six carries for 30 yards and 83 return yards in 11 games and no starts.

==== 2018 season ====
Mostert played very sparingly during the first five games of the season. However, his role increased starting in Week 6 when he had 12 carries for 87 yards during the 33–30 road loss to the Green Bay Packers on Monday Night Football. In the next game against the Los Angeles Rams, Mostert recorded seven carries for 59 yards and four receptions for 19 yards during the 39–10 loss. Two weeks later against the Oakland Raiders on Thursday Night Football, Mostert rushed seven times for 86 yards and scored his first NFL touchdown on a 52-yard rush in the third quarter before leaving the eventual 34–3 victory with a fractured forearm. Mostert was placed on injured reserve on November 2.

Mostert finished the 2018 season with 34 carries for 261 yards and a touchdown to go along with six receptions for 25 yards in nine games and no starts.

==== 2019 season ====
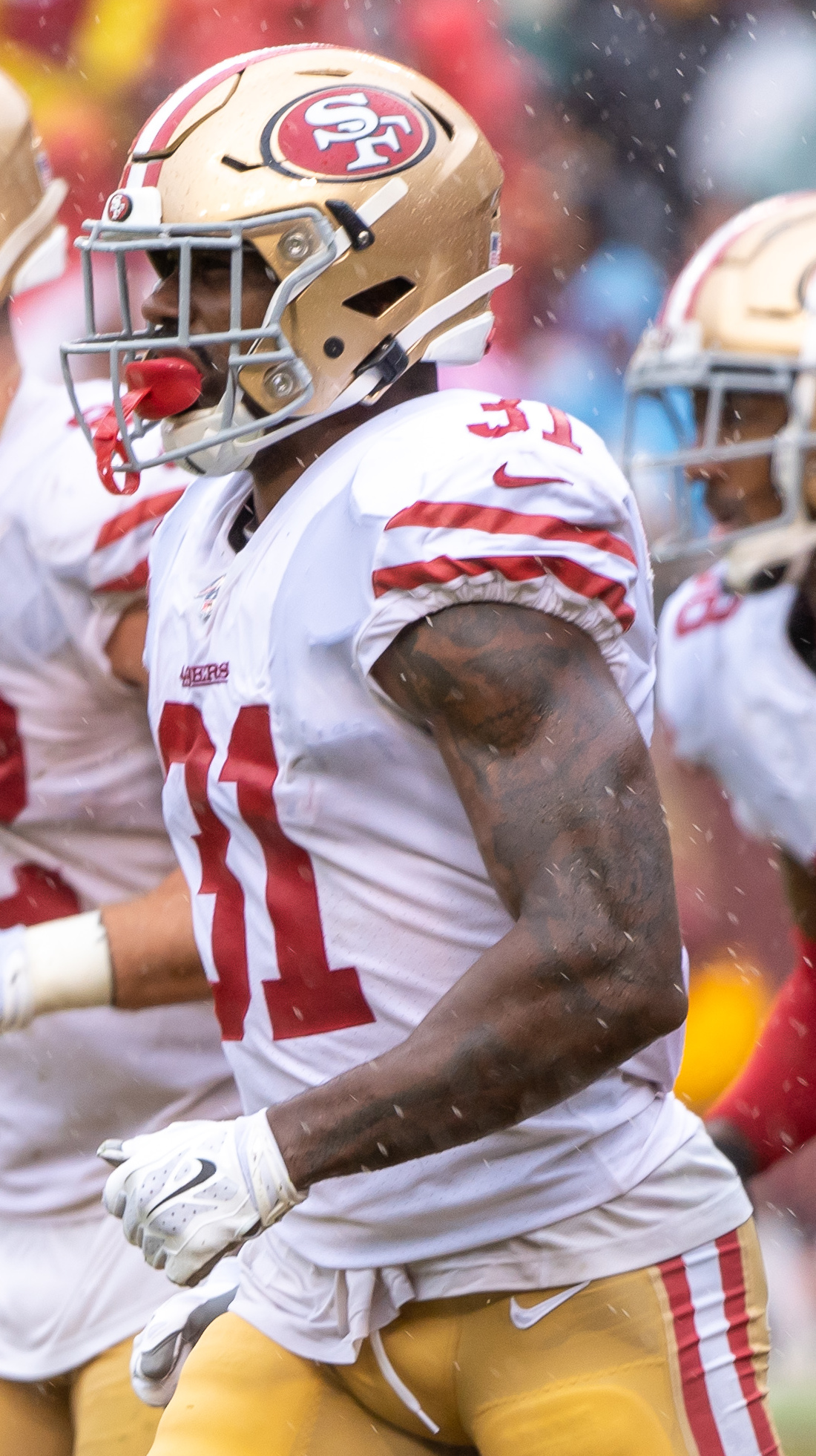
Mostert in 2019

On March 15, 2019, Mostert signed a three-year contract extension with the 49ers.

Moster began the season with nine carries for 40 yards in the season-opening 31–17 road victory over the Tampa Bay Buccaneers. In the next game against the Cincinnati Bengals, he had 13 carries for 83 yards to go along with three receptions for 68 yards and his first receiving touchdown of his career on a 39-yard screen pass from Jimmy Garoppolo during the 41–17 road victory. The following week against the Pittsburgh Steelers, Mostert rushed 12 times for 79 yards in the 24–20 victory.

Following a Week 4 bye, the 49ers faced the Cleveland Browns on Monday Night Football. In that game, Mostert had seven carries for 34 yards and a fumble recovery during the 31–3 blowout victory. Three weeks later against the Carolina Panthers, Mostert scored his first rushing touchdown of the season on a 41-yard rush in the fourth quarter and finished the 51–13 victory with nine carries for 60 yards and the aforementioned touchdown.

During a Week 12 37–8 victory over the Packers, Mostert recorded six carries for 45 yards and a touchdown to go along with a 22-yard reception. In the next game against the Baltimore Ravens, he had his first 100-yard game, finishing with 19 carries for 146 yards and a 40-yard touchdown to go along with two receptions for eight yards during the 20–17 road loss. The following week against the New Orleans Saints, Mostert rushed 10 times for 69 yards and a touchdown and caught two passes for 40 yards, including a 35-yard touchdown pass thrown by wide receiver Emmanuel Sanders in the narrow 48–46 road victory. Mostert rushed for a touchdown in each of the next two games against the Atlanta Falcons and Rams. During the regular-season finale against the Seahawks, he had 10 carries for 57 yards and two touchdowns to go along with a 16-yard reception in the 26–21 road victory.

Mostert finished the 2019 season with 137 carries for 772 yards and eight touchdowns along with 14 receptions for 180 yards and two touchdowns in 16 games and no starts. The 49ers finished atop the NFC West with a 13–3 record and qualified for the playoffs as the #1-seed. During the Divisional Round against Minnesota Vikings, Mostert rushed 12 times for 58 yards and recovered a fumble lost by punt returner Marcus Sherels before leaving the eventual 27–10 victory in the fourth quarter with a calf injury. Mostert returned from injury in time for the NFC Championship Game against the Packers, recording 29 carries for a franchise postseason record of 220 yards and four touchdowns (second in franchise postseason history only to NFL record-holder Ricky Watters, and tied with LeGarrette Blount for second-most in NFL postseason history) to go along with two receptions for six yards during the 37–20 victory as the 49ers advanced to Super Bowl LIV. It was the second-most rushing yards in NFL postseason history to Eric Dickerson's 248 in 1986. During the Super Bowl against the Kansas City Chiefs, Mostert had 12 carries for 59 yards and a touchdown to go along with a two-yard reception in the 31–20 loss.

==== 2020 season ====
On July 8, 2020, Mostert requested a trade from the 49ers. He rescinded his request after securing a restructured contract with the 49ers on July 27.

During the season-opening 24–20 loss to the Arizona Cardinals, Mostert had 15 carries for 56 yards to go along with four receptions for 95 yards and a 76-yard touchdown. In the next game against the New York Jets, he led the game off with an 80-yard rushing touchdown and finished with eight carries for 92 yards and the aforementioned touchdown to go along with two receptions for 15 yards before leaving the eventual 31–13 road victory with an apparent injury after the first half. Three weeks later against the Miami Dolphins, Mostert recorded 11 carries for 90 yards and three receptions for 29 yards in the 43–17 loss.

During Week 6 against the Rams on Sunday Night Football, Mostert had 17 carries for 65 yards and two receptions for 11 yards in the 24–16 victory. However, he was placed on injured reserve with a high ankle sprain on October 24. Mostert was activated on November 28. In his first game back against the Rams, Mostert rushed 16 times for 43 yards and a touchdown during the 23–20 road victory. He was placed back on injured reserve on December 25.

Mostert finished the 2020 season with 104 carries for 521 yards and two touchdowns to go along with 16 receptions for 156 yards and a touchdown in eight games and starts.

==== 2021 season ====
During the season-opener against the Detroit Lions, Mostert rushed twice for 20 yards before leaving the eventual 41–33 road victory with an apparent knee injury. It was later revealed that he was diagnosed with significant cartilage damage in his knee. Mostert was originally slated to be out for at least eight weeks, but it was later deemed that the injury was serious enough to prematurely end his season. Without Mostert, the 49ers finished with a 10–7 record and reached the NFC Championship Game, where they lost to the Rams.

=== Miami Dolphins (second stint) ===
==== 2022 season ====
On March 17, 2022, Mostert signed a one-year contract with the Dolphins.

During a Week 5 40–17 road loss to the Jets, Mostert had 18 carries for 113 yards and a touchdown to go along with a nine-yard reception. Two weeks later against the Steelers, he recorded 16 carries for 79 yards to go along with four receptions for 30 yards and a touchdown in the 16–10 victory.

During Week 9 against the Chicago Bears, Mostert rushed nine times for 26 yards and a touchdown in the 35–32 road victory. In the next game against the Browns, he had eight carries for 65 yards and a touchdown to go along with four receptions for 22 yards during the 39–17 victory. During a Week 15 32–29 road loss to the Buffalo Bills, Mostert had 17 carries for 136 yards and a 20-yard reception. Two weeks later against the New England Patriots, he recorded nine carries for 29 yards to go along with eight receptions for 62 yards and a touchdown in the narrow 23–21 road loss. During the regular-season finale against the Jets, Mostert rushed 11 times for 71 yards before leaving the eventual 11–6 victory with a broken thumb.

Mostert finished the 2022 season with 181 carries for 891 yards and three touchdowns to go along with 31 receptions for 202 yards and two touchdowns in 16 games and 14 starts. He also returned 25 kicks for 502 yards.

==== 2023 season ====
On March 15, 2023, Mostert signed a two-year, $5.6 million contract extension with the Dolphins.

During the narrow season-opening 36–34 road victory over the Los Angeles Chargers, Mostert had 10 carries for 37 yards and a touchdown to go along with two receptions for 13 yards. In the next game against the Patriots, he recorded 18 carries for 121 yards and two touchdowns to go along with a six-yard reception during the 24–17 road victory. The following week against the Denver Broncos, Mostert contributed significantly both on the ground and through the air in the 70–20 victory, rushing 13 times for 82 yards and three touchdowns as well as catching seven passes for 60 yards and a touchdown.

During Week 5 against the New York Giants, Mostert recorded 10 carries for 65 yards and a touchdown to go along with two receptions for 13 yards in the 31–16 victory. In the next game against the Panthers, he had 17 carries for 115 yards and two touchdowns to go along with three receptions for 17 yards and a touchdown during the 42–21 victory. Mostert was named AFC Offensive Player of the Week for his performance against the Panthers. Two weeks later against the Patriots, Mostert rushed 13 times for 46 yards and a touchdown in the 31–17 victory.

During a Week 9 21–14 loss to the Chiefs in Germany, Mostert rushed 12 times for 85 yards and a touchdown. Three weeks later against the Jets, he recorded 20 carries for 94 yards and two touchdowns in the 34–13 road victory. In the next game against the Washington Commanders, Mostert had 11 carries for 43 yards and a touchdown to go along with an eight-yard reception during the 45–15 road victory.

During Week 14 against the Tennessee Titans on Monday Night Football, Mostert had 21 carries for 96 yards and two touchdowns to go along with a four-yard reception in the narrow 28–27 loss. In the next game against the Jets, he scored his 19th and 20th touchdowns of the season, earning Mostert the record for the Dolphins player with the most touchdowns in a single regular season in franchise history. He finished the 30–0 shutout victory with 15 carries for 42 yards and the two aforementioned touchdowns.

On January 3, 2024, Mostert was selected to his first Pro Bowl after leading the NFL in total (rushing/receiving) touchdowns with 21. He finished the 2023 season with 209 carries for 1,012 yards and 18 touchdowns to go with 25 receptions for 175 yards and three touchdowns in 15 games and starts. During the Wild Card Round against the Chiefs, Mostert rushed eight times for 33 yards in the 26–7 road loss.

==== 2024 season ====
During a Week 5 15–10 road victory over the Patriots, Mostert set season-highs in carries with 19 and rushing yards with 80 while also recording two receptions for 18 yards. Three weeks later against the Cardinals, he had nine carries for 19 yards and two touchdowns to go along with an 11-yard reception in the narrow 28–27 loss.

Mostert finished the 2024 season with 85 carries for 278 yards and two touchdowns to go along with 19 receptions for 161 yards in 13 games and one start. He was released by the Dolphins on February 14, 2025.

=== Las Vegas Raiders ===
On March 13, 2025, Mostert signed with the Las Vegas Raiders on a one-year, $2.1 million contract. He finished the season with 22 carries for 104 yards and 12 receptions for 70 yards to go along with 23 returns for 673 yards in 12 games and no starts.

== Career statistics ==
Legend
	Led the league
**Bold**	Career high

=== NFL ===
==== Regular season ====
Year	Team	Games		Rushing					Receiving					Returning					Fumbles	
Year	Team	GP	GS	Att	Yds	Avg	Lng	TD	Rec	Yds	Avg	Lng	TD	Ret	Yds	Avg	Lng	TD	Fum	Lost
2015	MIA	1	0	0	0	0.0	0	0	0	0	0.0	0	0	2	57	28.5	32	0	0	0
2015	BAL	7	0	0	0	0.0	0	0	0	0	0.0	0	0	5	164	32.8	50	0	0	0
2015	CLE	3	0	0	0	0.0	0	0	0	0	0.0	0	0	12	309	25.8	53	0	1	1
2016	CHI	2	0	0	0	0.0	0	0	0	0	0.0	0	0	0	0	0.0	0	0	0	0
2016	SF	1	0	1	6	6.0	6	0	0	0	0.0	0	0	2	68	**34.0**	33	0	0	0
2017	SF	11	0	6	30	5.0	16	0	0	0	0.0	0	0	5	83	16.6	21	0	1	1
2018	SF	9	0	34	261	7.7	52	1	6	25	4.2	23	0	0	0	0.0	0	0	1	1
2019	SF	16	0	137	772	5.6	41	8	14	180	**12.9**	39	2	0	-19	0.0	-19	0	2	**2**
2020	SF	8	8	104	521	5.0	**80**	2	16	156	9.8	**76**	1	0	0	0.0	0	0	1	1
2021	SF	1	1	2	20	**10.0**	11	0	0	0	0.0	0	0	0	0	0.0	0	0	0	0
2022	MIA	16	14	181	891	4.9	67	3	**31**	**202**	6.5	25	2	**25**	502	20.1	31	0	1	1
2023	MIA	15	15	**209**	**1,012**	4.8	49	**18**	25	175	7.0	22	**3**	0	0	0.0	0	0	**4**	1
2024	MIA	13	1	85	278	3.3	21	2	19	161	8.5	25	0	2	42	21.0	23	0	2	**2**
2025	LV	12	0	22	104	4.7	37	0	12	70	5.8	18	0	23	**673**	29.3	**54**	0	0	0
Career		115	39	781	3,895	5.0	80T	34	123	969	7.9	76T	8	76	1,879	24.7	54	0	13	10

==== Postseason ====
Year	Team	Games		Rushing					Receiving					Returning					Fumbles	
Year	Team	GP	GS	Att	Yds	Avg	Lng	TD	Rec	Yds	Avg	Lng	TD	Ret	Yds	Avg	Lng	TD	Fum	Lost
2019	SF	3	0	**53**	**336**	**6.3**	**36**	**5**	**3**	**8**	**2.7**	**10**	0	0	0	0.0	0	0	0	0
2021	SF	0	0	Did not play due to injury																
2022	MIA	0	0	Did not play due to injury																
2023	MIA	1	1	8	33	4.1	8	0	1	-3	-3.0	-3	0	0	0	0.0	0	0	0	0
Career		4	1	61	369	6.0	36	5	4	5	1.3	10	0	0	0	0	0	0	0	0

=== College ===
Season	Team	GP	Rushing				Receiving				Kickoff returns			
Season	Team	GP	Att	Yds	Avg	TD	Rec	Yds	Avg	TD	Att	Yds	Avg	TD
2011	Purdue	12	16	108	**6.8**	2	—	—	—	—	25	**837**	**33.5**	**1**
2012	Purdue	8	16	85	5.3	1	—	—	—	—	18	463	25.7	0
2013	Purdue	12	11	37	3.4	0	1	6	6.0	0	11	258	23.5	**1**
2014	Purdue	11	**93**	**529**	5.7	**3**	**18**	**116**	**6.4**	0	**34**	731	21.5	0
Career		43	136	759	5.6	6	19	122	6.4	0	88	2,289	26.0	2

== Personal life ==
Growing up in Florida near the Atlantic Ocean, Mostert made aquatic life his first love and priority. Mostert is an advocate for ocean conservancy and melanoma awareness. His hometown, New Smyrna Beach, is known as the "shark-bite capital of the world," and Mostert often surfed in the Atlantic Ocean. In 2024, Mostert purchased the Sport Fishing Championship team "East Coast Remix Angling Club" in Northeast Florida. He was inspired to do so following his participation in an SFC celebrity fishing competition that he participated in alongside fellow NFL running back Alvin Kamara, who also purchased a team.

Mostert is an avid ping pong player, and notably represented the Miami Dolphins in the inaugural P&G Battle of the Paddles in 2023.

Mostert married Devon Beckwith on March 3, 2017. Their first son, Gunnar Grey, was born in June 2018. Their second son, Neeko, was born on September 22, 2020. Their third son, Myles, was born on June 7, 2022.

During his time with the 49ers, Mostert kept a list of all the teams that cut him before he signed with San Francisco and looked at it for motivation before every game.
