= Rob Henry (American football) =

American football player (born 1990)

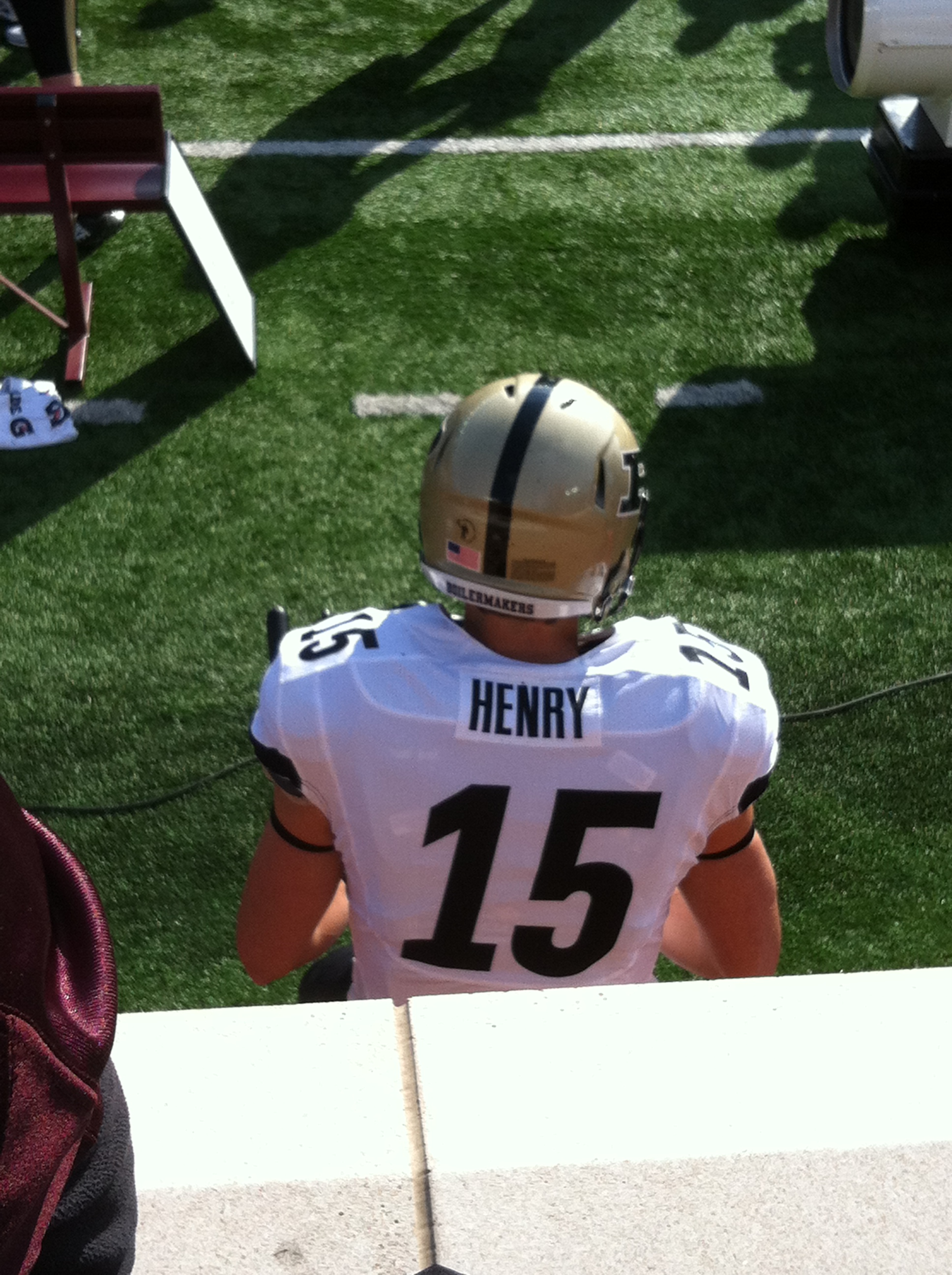
- Henry in 2012

No. 15
- Positions: Quarterback, safety

Personal information
- Born: January 26, 1990 (age 36)
- Listed height: 6 ft 2 in (1.88 m)
- Listed weight: 197 lb (89 kg)

Career information
- High school: Ocala (FL) Trinity Catholic
- College: Purdue
- NFL draft: 2014: undrafted

Career history
- Oakland Raiders (2014)*
- * Offseason or practice squad member only

Robert Wayne Henry, III (born January 26, 1990) is an American former football player. He previously played quarterback and safety for the Purdue Boilermakers.

Henry attended Trinity Catholic High School in Ocala, Florida, where he played both football and baseball, and competed in track & field. Henry led Trinity Catholic to two conference championships and a runner-up in the 2B State Championship game. He ended his high school football career with over 4,300 total yards and 39 touchdowns. After his senior season, he moved on to Purdue University where he redshirted in 2009.

In his first collegiate appearance, Henry ran for 16-yards against Notre Dame. He would later assume the starting quarterback position after an injury to Robert Marve. His first career start was against Northwestern, which saw him lead the Boilermakers to a 20–17 win on the road led by his career high, 132 yards rushing. Henry went on to start 5 games for the season, with a 3-game set back, which he injured a finger on his throwing hand. Against Minnesota he had a career-high running for 3 touchdowns. In the final game of the season against Indiana he had a career-high 252 yard passing and 3 touchdown passes. He became the first Purdue quarterback to lead the Boilermakers in both passing and rushing yardage in the same season, with 996 passing yards and 547 yards rushing.

After a starting quarterback battle in the off season, Henry was named the Boilermakers' starting quarterback for the 2011 season and was voted co-captain, but he tore the ACL in his right knee. With backup Marve still recovering from his own ACL injury, Caleb TerBush took over as the starting quarterback in their place.

Henry returned in 2012, and was named the third-string quarterback behind TerBush and Marve. To get on the field, the Boilermakers used Henry as both a running back and wide receiver, in addition to quarterbacking.

Henry was named the starting quarterback for the Boilermakers during 2013 fall camp. Henry beat out true freshman, Danny Etling, and redshirt freshman, Austin Appleby. Henry started the first 5 games of the season for the Boilermakers, before being replaced just before halftime during their 5 game of the season by Etling. The week following Henry's removal from quarterback, he was moved to safety.

== Early life ==
Henry went to Trinity Catholic High School in Ocala, Florida. There he was coached by John Brantley, and was a Mr. Football finalist and first team all-state after passing for 2,600 yards and 24 touchdowns as senior, while rushing for 350 yards and six touchdowns. He led the Celtics to the 2B state championship game, but lost 21–17 to Pahokee High School. As a result, he was named to Reebok Florida Phenoms third team. It wasn't clear if he would start as a junior, but he won the battle, and went on to pass for 1,100 yards and 10 touchdowns while also rushing for 250 yards and five scores, while missing some time with a knee injury. He was a two-time all-county selection in football, and led his team to state finals his senior season. As a freshman and sophomore, he played free safety and wide receiver, while John Brantley was at quarterback. He was a first team all-division his freshman and sophomore seasons. He also participated in basketball and track and field.

College recruiting
Name	Hometown	School	Height	Weight	40^{‡}	Commit date
Rob Henry; QB	Ocala, Florida	Trinity Catholic High School	6 ft 2 in (1.88 m)	193 lb (88 kg)	4.5.5	Jul 23, 2008
Rob Henry; QB	Recruit ratings: Scout: Rivals:					
Overall recruit ranking: Scout: 82 (QB) Rivals: -- (QB), -- (FL)
‡ Refers to 40-yard dash; Note: In many cases, Scout, Rivals, 247Sports, On3, and ESPN may conflict in their listings of height, weight and 40 time.; In these cases, the average was taken. ESPN grades are on a 100-point scale.; Sources: "2009 Team Ranking". Rivals.com.

Henry committed to Purdue University on July 23, 2008. He choose Purdue over football scholarships from Vanderbilt University and Northern Illinois University.

== College career ==
=== 2009 season ===
In 2009, Henry sat for the season using his redshirt to learn head coach Danny Hope's offense.

=== 2010 season ===
The 2010 season began with Henry slated second on the depth chart behind transfer, Robert Marve. However, Hope said that Henry would see playing time even if the game was still undecided. Against Notre Dame, Henry only got three carries for 16 yards. After a win against Minnesota, he was named the Big Ten Freshman of the Week. He was named the team's Leonard Wilson Award winner (unselfishness and dedication). He was also the first Purdue quarterback in school history to lead the team in both rushing and passing yardage in a season. He completed 86 of 162 pass attempts (53.1 percent) for 996 yards with eight touchdowns and seven interceptions, while rushing for 547 yards and four touchdowns on 104 attempts (5.3 yards per carry). For the season, Henry appeared in 11 games, making seven starts in 2010.

=== 2011 season ===
After a starting quarterback battle in the off season, Henry was named the Boilermakers' starting quarterback for the 2011 season, but he tore the ACL in his right knee. With backup Marve still recovering from his own ACL injury, Caleb TerBush took over as the starting quarterback in their place.

=== 2012 season ===
Henry entered his junior season looking at splitting playing time with TerBush and Marve. With TerBush working mostly with the first team, he was expected to start the first game of the year, until it was announced (one hour prior to gametime) that he had been suspended and Marve was the starting quarterback. Henry was promoted to second string, seeing most of his action in the second half of play. Henry finished the day 7 for 9 passing for 1 touchdown and 1 interception. After not playing in the Notre Dame game, Henry was named the backup against Eastern Michigan, as Marve was sidelined with his third ACL tear. Henry played a few plays in the second quarter, before seeing increased playing time in the 3rd quarter due to the Boilermakers large lead. Most of his plays came throwing the ball, as Coach Hope felt that was his largest area in need of improvement.

=== 2013 season ===
With Marve and TerBush out of the mix due to graduation, and new Purdue head coach Darrell Hazell, Henry entered fall camp with the Boilermakers competing with freshmen Danny Etling and Austin Appleby for Purdue's starting quarterback spot. Two weeks before the regular season opener at Cincinnati, Hazell named Henry Purdue's starting quarterback.

=== Statistics ===
As of the end of the 2013 regular season, Henry's statistics are as follows:

		Passing								Rushing			Receiving
Season	Team	GP	Rating	Att	Comp	Pct	Yds	TD	INT	Att	Yds	TD	Rec	Yds	TD
2010	Purdue	11	112.4	162	86	53.1	996	8	7	104	547	4	1	11	0
2012	Purdue	11	123.8	38	21	55.3	216	3	1	28	74	1	6	65	0
2013	Purdue	5	100.7	151	81	53.6	832	4	6	29	36	2	0	0	0
	Totals	25	108.6	351	188	53.6	2,044	15	14	161	657	7	7	76	0

Henry had a 3–9 career record as the starting quarterback for Purdue.

== Professional career ==
Prior to the 2014 NFL draft, Henry was projected to be undrafted by NFLDraftScout.com. He was rated as the thirty-fourth-best quarterback in the draft.

Pre-draft measurables
Height	Weight	Arm length	Hand span	Wingspan	40-yard dash	10-yard split	20-yard split	Vertical jump	Broad jump	Bench press
6 ft 1 7/8 in (1.88 m)	197 lb (89 kg)	31 3/8 in (0.80 m)	9 1/4 in (0.23 m)	6 ft 3 1/2 in (1.92 m)	4.56 s	1.61 s	2.56 s	37.5 in (0.95 m)	10 ft 5 in (3.18 m)	22 reps
All values from Pro Day

On May 10, 2014, Henry signed as an undrafted free agent with the Oakland Raiders.

== Playing style ==
Henry is a dual-threat quarterback, known more for his ability to run the ball, than for his throwing arm.
