= Jake Slaughter =

American football player (born 2002)

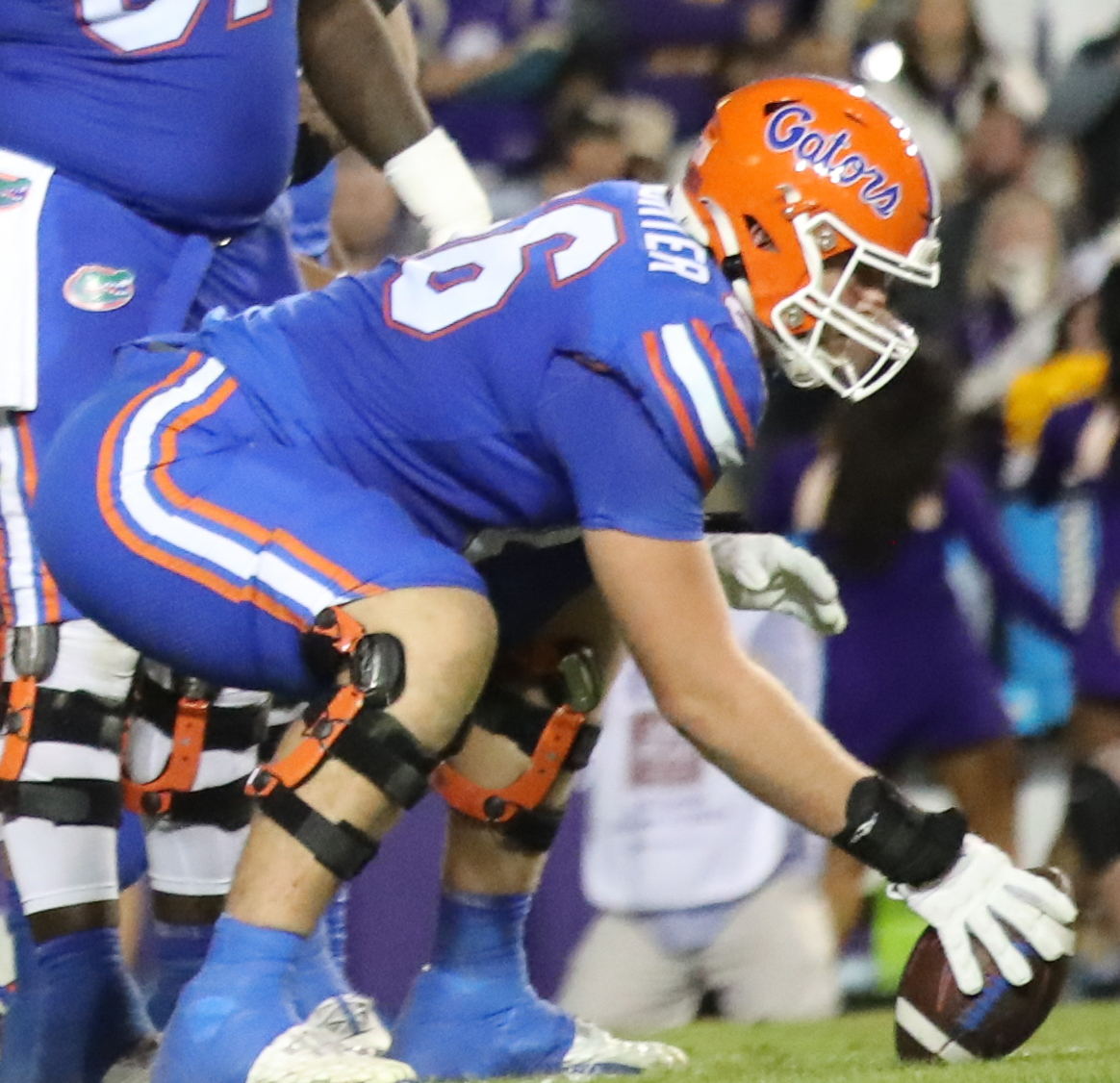
- Slaughter with the Florida Gators in 2023

No. 66 – Los Angeles Chargers
- Position: Center
- Roster status: Active

Personal information
- Born: December 12, 2002 (age 23); Marion County, Florida, U.S.
- Listed height: 6 ft 4 in (1.93 m)
- Listed weight: 308 lb (140 kg)

Career information
- High school: Trinity Catholic (Ocala, Florida)
- College: Florida (2021–2025)
- NFL draft: 2026: 2nd round, 63rd overall pick

Career history
- Los Angeles Chargers (2026–present)

Awards and highlights
- First-team All-American (2024); Second-team All-American (2025); 2× First-team All-SEC (2024, 2025)

Career NFL statistics as of Week 4, 2026
- Games played: 4
- Games started: 4
- Stats at Pro Football Reference

Jake Slaughter (born December 12, 2002) is an American professional football center for the Los Angeles Chargers of the National Football League (NFL). He played college football for the Florida Gators and was selected by the Chargers in the second round of the 2026 NFL draft.

== Early life ==
Slaughter attended Trinity Catholic High School in Ocala, Florida. He was rated as a three-star recruit and held offers from schools such as Florida, Florida State, Miami, Georgia Tech, West Virginia, Arkansas and Utah. Slaughter initially committed to play college football for the Florida State Seminoles before flipping his commitment to play for the in-state rivals Florida Gators.

== College career ==
Slaughter took a redshirt season in 2021, only appearing in one game for the Gators. In 2022, he appeared in all 13 games, mostly on special teams. In 2023, Slaughter appeared in all 12 games for Florida, while getting his first time as a starter, making eight starts at center over 622 total snaps.

Heading into 2024, Slaughter was named a team captain. In 2024, Slaughter started all 13 games for the Gators and earned first-team all-SEC and first-team All-American honors. Slaughter helped lead an in-season turnaround from 4–5 to 8–5, allowing only a single sack and quarterback hit over 800 snaps.

Slaughter made the decision to return to Florida for his final year of eligibility, leading the drive for other Gator offensive linesmen to return to the program. Ahead of the 2025 season, Slaughter was named the best returning offensive player in the SEC by PFF. He was also named to the preseason All-American watchlist and Outland Trophy watchlist.

== Professional career ==
Pre-draft measurables
Height	Weight	Arm length	Hand span	Wingspan	40-yard dash	10-yard split	20-yard split	Vertical jump	Broad jump	Bench press
6 ft 4 7/8 in (1.95 m)	303 lb (137 kg)	32 3/8 in (0.82 m)	10 in (0.25 m)	6 ft 7 5/8 in (2.02 m)	5.10 s	1.74 s	2.93 s	32.5 in (0.83 m)	9 ft 2 in (2.79 m)	22 reps
All values from NFL Combine/Pro Day

Slaughter was selected in the second round by the Los Angeles Chargers with the 63rd overall pick of the 2026 NFL draft.
