= Trinity Catholic High School (Florida) =

Roman Catholic school in Florida, US

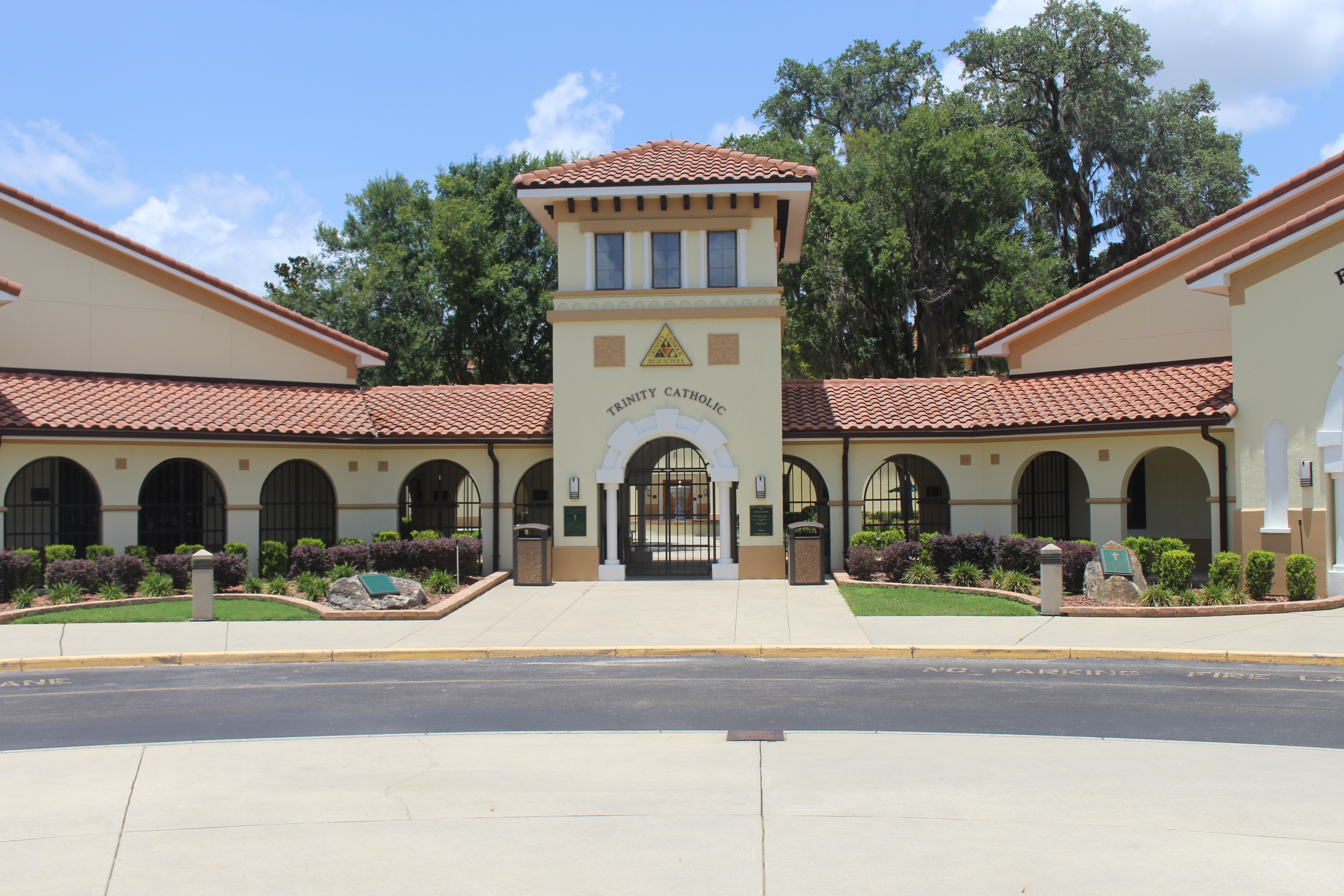
- School building

Location
- 2600 SW 42nd Street; Ocala, Florida 34471; United States; 29°8′43″N 82°10′4″W

Information
- School type: Private, coeducational secondary school
- Motto: Nulli Secundus (Second to None)
- Religious affiliations: Roman Catholic, Congregation of Christian Brothers
- Established: 2000
- Oversight: Diocese of Orlando
- Superintendent: Henry Fortier
- CEEB code: 101616
- President: Mr. Lou Pereira
- Principal: Mrs. Tammie Vassou
- Chaplain: Fr. Patrick Sheedy
- Faculty: 41
- Grades: 9–12
- Gender: Male and female
- Enrollment: 530 (2022-2023)
- Average class size: 20
- Classes offered: AP, Honors, Dual Enrollment, College Prep
- Campus type: Urban
- Colors: Green and gold
- Slogan: Live Jesus in our hearts . . . forever.
- Athletics conference: FHSAA, IEA
- Mascot: Rocky
- Nickname: Celtics
- Accreditation: Southern Association of Colleges and Schools and Florida Catholic Conference
- Publication: "Mem'ries" annual magazine
- Yearbook: The Celtic
- Tuition: $13,700 - Catholic / $15,800 - Other faith traditions
- Communities served: Serving 6 contiguous counties: Marion, Alachua, Levy, Citrus, Sumter, Lake
- Feeder schools: Blessed Trinity, St. Paul's
- Graduates: 98% graduation rate
- Affiliation: College of Central Florida, Embry-Riddle Aeronautical University, Barry University
- Website: trinitycatholichs.org

Trinity Catholic High School is a Roman Catholic college preparatory day school in Ocala, Florida. Located in the Diocese of Orlando, Trinity Catholic is the first and only Catholic high school in Ocala.

Trinity Catholic High School was founded in 2000 by the Diocese of Orlando. The founding Principal was Br. Thomas Andrew Prendergast.

There were approximately 50 students which comprised the 9th grade and the school was conducted in a wing of classrooms in Blessed Trinity School, Ocala. In its second year, the 9th and 10th grades were held in portable classrooms on the actual site on which the school was being built.

As of the 2021-2022 school year, the institute serves 529 students from grades 9-12.

== Notable alumni ==
- Antonio Allen, American football free safety for the New York Jets
- Kadron Boone, American football player for the New York Giants
- Brittany Bowe, American speed skater and Olympian
- John Brantley, college football player
- Geron Christian, American football player for the Washington Redskins
- Ulysees Gilbert III, American football player for the Pittsburgh Steelers
- Rob Henry, American football player
- Jake Slaughter, American Football player for the Los Angeles Chargers
- Tabby Tindell, women's soccer player

== Sports ==
Trinity Catholic won the FHSAA Football State Championship in 2005 and 2010. Trinity Catholic's girls' soccer team won the FHSAA Soccer State Championship in 2013. In 2011 Quincy Hoppel won the FHSAA 1A 145lb State Championship in wrestling. In 2017, the track team won the FHSAA 2A Girls State Championship in Adapted Track & Field. On May 4, 2018, Jordan Lewis won a state championship in the Boys 110m Hurdles. On November 15, 2018, the volleyball team won the FHSAA 5A State Championship. baseball won states in 2014
