= Geron Christian =

American football player (born 1996)

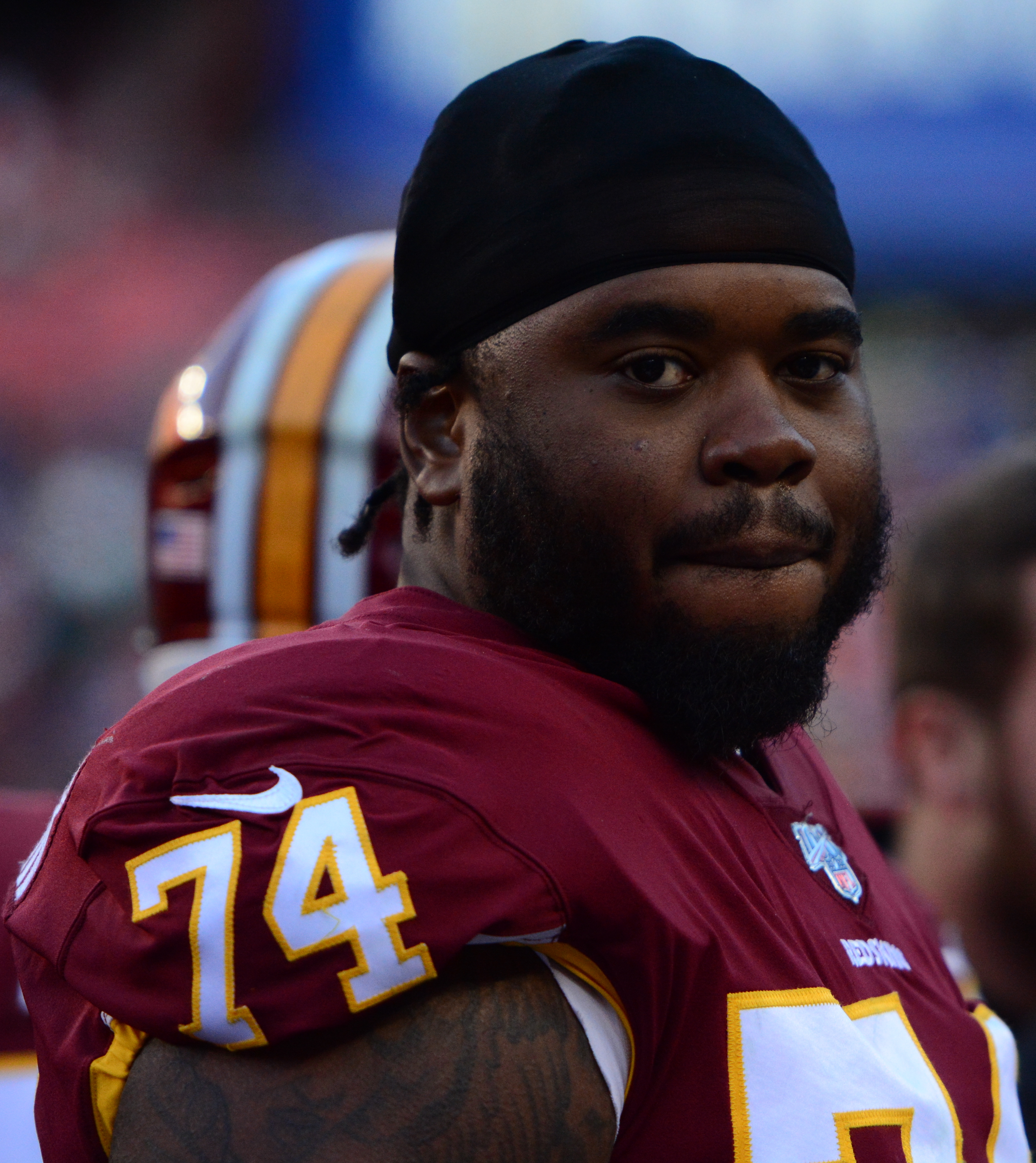
- Christian with the Washington Redskins in 2019

No. 61 – Jacksonville Jaguars
- Position: Offensive tackle
- Roster status: Practice squad

Personal information
- Born: September 10, 1996 (age 30); Ocala, Florida, U.S.
- Listed height: 6 ft 5 in (1.96 m)
- Listed weight: 302 lb (137 kg)

Career information
- High school: Trinity Catholic (Ocala)
- College: Louisville (2015–2017)
- NFL draft: 2018: 3rd round, 74th overall pick

Career history
- Washington Redskins / Football Team (2018–2020); Houston Texans (2021); Kansas City Chiefs (2022); Miami Dolphins (2022); Houston Texans (2023); Cleveland Browns (2023); Tennessee Titans (2024)*; Los Angeles Rams (2024); Cleveland Browns (2024); Dallas Cowboys (2025)*; Denver Broncos (2025); Jacksonville Jaguars (2026–present)*
- * Offseason or practice squad member only

Career NFL statistics as of 2025
- Games played: 63
- Games started: 25
- Stats at Pro Football Reference

Geron Christian Sr. (born September 10, 1996) is an American professional football offensive tackle for the Jacksonville Jaguars of the National Football League (NFL). He played college football for the Louisville Cardinals and was selected by the Washington Redskins in the third round of the 2018 NFL draft. Christian has also played for the Houston Texans, Kansas City Chiefs, and Cleveland Browns.

== Early life ==
Christian graduated from Trinity Catholic High School in Ocala, Florida in 2015 after transferring from West Port High School, also located in Ocala. Along with football, he also played basketball. A 3-star offensive line recruit, Christian originally committed to play college football for Miami, but later flipped his commitment to Louisville over offers from Arkansas, East Carolina, Florida Atlantic, Middle Tennessee State, Mississippi State, and Texas.

== College career ==
Christian was a starting offensive tackle for Louisville from 2015 to 2017, starting all 39 games of his career since joining the team as a true freshman. After his junior season in 2017, he declared for the 2018 NFL draft. Christian was named an Honorable Mention All-ACC offensive tackle in all three of his seasons at Louisville.

== Professional career ==
=== Pre-draft ===
Pre-draft measurables
Height	Weight	Arm length	Hand span	Wingspan	40-yard dash	10-yard split	20-yard split	Bench press
6 ft 5 1/8 in (1.96 m)	298 lb (135 kg)	35 in (0.89 m)	10 3/4 in (0.27 m)	6 ft 10 3/4 in (2.10 m)	5.33 s	1.80 s	3.08 s	22 reps
All values from NFL Combine/Pro Day

On January 3, 2018, Christian announced his decision to forgo his senior season and enter the 2018 NFL draft. Christian elected to enter the draft although the NFL's underclass advisory committee told him that he would probably not be selected in the first or second round. Christian attended the NFL Scouting Combine in Indianapolis and chose to only perform the 40-yard dash, 20-yard dash, 10-yard dash, bench press, and positional drills. On March 29, 2018, he participated at Louisville's pro day, but opted to stand on the majority of his combine numbers and only performed the bench press (22 reps). He also attended pre-draft visits and private workouts with the New York Giants, Detroit Lions, and Denver Broncos. At the conclusion of the pre-draft process, Christian was projected to be a fourth round pick by the majority of NFL draft experts and scouts. He was ranked the fourth best offensive tackle in the draft by Scouts Inc., was ranked the 10th best offensive tackle by Sports Illustrated, and was ranked the 11th best offensive tackle prospect in the draft by DraftScout.com.

=== Washington Redskins / Football Team ===
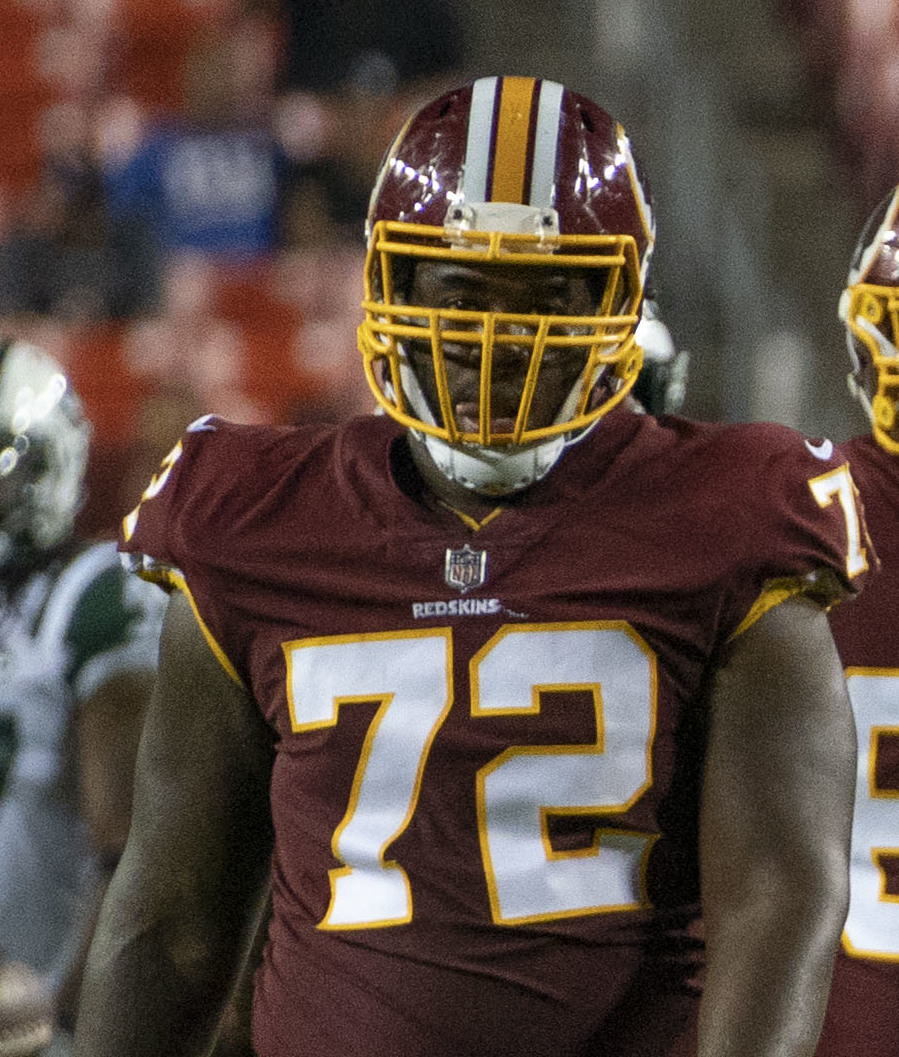
Christian in 2018

The Washington Redskins selected Christian in the third round (74th overall) of the 2018 NFL draft. Christian was the seventh offensive tackle drafted in 2018. Christian signed his four-year rookie contract, worth $3.74 million, on June 24, 2018. He played in two games before suffering a torn medial collateral ligament (MCL) in Week 10 and was placed on injured reserve on November 13, 2018.

At the start of the 2020 season, Christian was named the starting left tackle replacing Trent Williams, who was traded to the San Francisco 49ers during the offseason, and Donald Penn, whom the team chose not to re-sign. Christian started the first six games before suffering a knee injury in Week 6. He missed the next three games before being placed on injured reserve on November 19, 2020. Christian was waived on May 20, 2021.

=== Houston Texans (first stint) ===
On May 21, 2021, Christian was claimed off waivers by the Houston Texans.

=== Kansas City Chiefs ===
On March 24, 2022, Christian signed a one-year deal with the Kansas City Chiefs. He was waived on January 4, 2023, after Mecole Hardman was activated off of injured reserve.

=== Miami Dolphins ===
On January 5, 2023, Christian was claimed off waivers by the Miami Dolphins. Christian signed a one-year contract extension on March 16. He was released on August 28.

=== Houston Texans (second stint) ===
On September 27, 2023, Christian was signed to the Texans practice squad. He was released on October 10.

=== Cleveland Browns (first stint) ===
On October 31, 2023, Christian was signed to the Cleveland Browns practice squad. He was signed to the active roster on November 7.

=== Tennessee Titans ===
On June 12, 2024, Christian signed with the Tennessee Titans. He was released on August 27.

=== Los Angeles Rams ===
On September 11, 2024, Christian signed with the Los Angeles Rams. He was released on October 15 and re-signed to the practice squad two days later.

=== Cleveland Browns (second stint) ===
On November 19, 2024, Christian was signed to the Cleveland Browns' active roster off the Rams practice squad.

=== Dallas Cowboys ===
On August 2, 2025, Christian signed with the Dallas Cowboys. He was released on August 26 as part of final roster cuts and was re-signed to the practice squad the next day.

=== Denver Broncos ===
On November 11, 2025, the Denver Broncos signed Christian off the Cowboys' practice squad to their 53-man roster. On January 5, 2026, he was waived by the Broncos before playing in a single game for them. He was re-signed to the practice squad two days later.

=== Jacksonville Jaguars ===
On August 8, 2026, Christian signed with the Jacksonville Jaguars. On August 30, Christian was released by Jacksonville as a part of final roster cuts; he was re-signed to the team's practice squad the next day.

== Personal life ==
Christian is younger brother of tight end Gerald Christian, who was the Mr. Irrelevant of the 2015 NFL draft.
