= Kadron Boone =

American football player (born 1991)

No. 85
- Position: Wide receiver

Personal information
- Born: September 13, 1991 (age 35); Ocala, Florida, U.S.
- Listed height: 6 ft 0 in (1.83 m)
- Listed weight: 202 lb (92 kg)

Career information
- High school: Trinity Catholic (Ocala)
- College: LSU
- NFL draft: 2014: undrafted

Career history
- Philadelphia Eagles (2014)*; St. Louis Rams (2014)*; Indianapolis Colts (2014–2015)*; New York Giants (2016)*; Saskatchewan Roughriders (2016)
- * Offseason or practice squad member only

Career CFL statistics
- Receptions: 2
- Receiving yards: 5
- Stats at Pro Football Reference

Kadron Boone (born September 13, 1991) is an American former professional football player who was a wide receiver for the Saskatchewan Roughriders of the Canadian Football League (CFL). He played college football for the LSU Tigers.

== Professional career ==
On May 10, 2014, Boone signed with the Philadelphia Eagles as an undrafted free agent. He was released on August 23, 2014, and was then signed to the St. Louis Rams practice squad on October 21. The Rams cut Boone on October 29, and the Indianapolis Colts signed him to their practice squad on December 31, 2014.

On May 9, 2016, Boone signed with the New York Giants. On August 30, 2016, he was waived by the Giants.

Boone was signed to the Saskatchewan Roughriders' practice roster on October 25, 2016. He was promoted to the active roster on October 28, 2016.
