= 2012 Purdue Boilermakers football team =

American college football season

2012 Purdue Boilermakers football

Heart of Dallas Bowl vs. Oklahoma State, L 14–58
- Conference: Big Ten Conference
- Leaders Division
- Record: 6–7 (3–5 Big Ten)
- Head coach: Danny Hope (4th season)
- Offensive coordinator: Gary Nord (4th season)
- Offensive scheme: Pro spread
- Defensive coordinator: Tim Tibesar (1st season)
- Base defense: 4–3
- Captains: Offensive captains; Akeem Shavers; Caleb TerBush; Crosby Wright; Defensive captains; Kawann Short; Ricardo Allen; Special teams captain; Raheem Mostert
- Home stadium: Ross–Ade Stadium

2012 Big Ten Conference football standings
	Conf.			Overall
Team	W		L	W		L
Legends Division
No. 25 Nebraska xy	7	–	1	10	–	4
No. 24 Michigan	6	–	2	8	–	5
No. 17 Northwestern	5	–	3	10	–	3
Michigan State	3	–	5	7	–	6
Iowa	2	–	6	4	–	8
Minnesota	2	–	6	6	–	7
Leaders Division
No. 3 Ohio State* x	8	–	0	12	–	0
Penn State*	6	–	2	8	–	4
Wisconsin y$	4	–	4	8	–	6
Purdue	3	–	5	6	–	7
Indiana	2	–	6	4	–	8
Illinois	0	–	8	2	–	10
Championship: Wisconsin 70, Nebraska 31
$ – BCS representative as conference champion; x – Division champion/co-champions; * Ohio State and Penn State ineligible for conference championship game and post-season bowl games due to NCAA sanctions.; Rankings from AP Poll

The 2012 Purdue Boilermakers football team represented the Purdue University during the 2012 NCAA Division I FBS football season. The Boilermakers played in the Leaders Division of the Big Ten Conference and played their home games at Ross–Ade Stadium in West Lafayette, Indiana. The team was led by head coach Danny Hope, who was in his fourth season and was fired after the end of the regular season. The season finished with a won-loss record of 6–7 overall, 3–5 in Big 10 Leaders Division, finishing in 4th place. The team was invited the 2013 Heart of Dallas Bowl, where they were defeated by Oklahoma State, 58–14.

== Preseason ==
In 2011, the Boilermakers became bowl eligible in their twelfth game, and played in the 2011 Little Caesars Pizza Bowl against Western Michigan, defeating the Broncos 37–32.

Purdue returns fifteen out of twenty-two starters—eight on offense and seven on defense. Purdue will be forced to replace captains Offensive tackle Dennis Kelly, linebacker Chris Carlino, as well as starters Defensive end Gerald Gooden Jr., Linebacker Joe Holland, Safety Albert Evans, Safety Logan Link Offensive tackle Nick Mondek, Kicker Carson Wiggs and Wide receiver Justin Siller, and key contributor Fullback Jared Crank. Several players left the Purdue program in 2012 for a variety of reasons. The most significant was Running back Reggie Pegram decided to transfer from the program following the bowl game. He ended up transferring to North Texas. Other's that left the program were running backs Doug Gentry and Devin Hill, kicker Ryan Ullrich and defensive tackle LaSalle Cooks.

Three Boilermakers were named to preseason watchlists. Raheem Mostert was named to the preseason Jet Award watch list, an award given to the top return specialist in the NCAA. Ricardo Allen was named to the preseason Jim Thorpe Award watchlist, an award given to the top defensive back in the NCAA. and Kawann Short was named to the preseason Lombardi Award watchlist, an award given to the top lineman in the NCAA. and Allen as well as Short have both been named to the Chuck Bednarik Award, which is given to the top defensive player in the NCAA.

== Recruiting ==
=== Position key ===
Back	B	Center	C	Cornerback	CB	Defensive back	DB
Defensive end	DE	Defensive lineman	DL	Defensive tackle	DT	End	E
Fullback	FB	Guard	G	Halfback	HB	Kicker	K
Kickoff returner	KR	Offensive tackle	OT	Offensive lineman	OL	Linebacker	LB
Long snapper	LS	Punter	P	Punt returner	PR	Quarterback	QB
Running back	RB	Safety	S	Tight end	TE	Wide receiver	WR

=== Recruits ===
College recruiting
Name	Hometown	School	Height	Weight	40^{‡}	Commit date
Danny Anthrop; WR	West Lafayette, Indiana	Lafayette Central Catholic H.S.	6 ft 0 in (1.83 m)	175 lb (79 kg)	--	Sep 23, 2011
Danny Anthrop; WR	Recruit ratings: Scout: Rivals: (73)					
Austin Appleby; QB	North Canton, Ohio	Hoover H.S.	6 ft 5 in (1.96 m)	228 lb (103 kg)	4.9	Jun 29, 2011
Austin Appleby; QB	Recruit ratings: Scout: Rivals: (75)					
Anthony Brown; DB	Tampa, Florida	Hillsborough H.S.	5 ft 11 in (1.80 m)	175 lb (79 kg)	--	Mar 24, 2011
Anthony Brown; DB	Recruit ratings: Scout: Rivals: (72)					
Carlos Carvajal; ATH	New Berlin, New York	Milford Academy	6 ft 7 in (2.01 m)	215 lb (98 kg)	--	Aug 29, 2011
Carlos Carvajal; ATH	Recruit ratings: Scout: Rivals: (PG)					
Cameron Cermin; OL	College Station, Texas	A&M Consolidated H.S.	6 ft 5 in (1.96 m)	291 lb (132 kg)	--	Oct 3, 2011
Cameron Cermin; OL	Recruit ratings: Scout: Rivals: (79)					
Jonathan Curry; TE	Phenix City, Alabama	Central H.S.	6 ft 2 in (1.88 m)	224 lb (102 kg)	4.8	Aug 1, 2011
Jonathan Curry; TE	Recruit ratings: Scout: Rivals: (78)					
Andy Garcia; LB	Hialeah, Florida	Hialeah H.S.	5 ft 11 in (1.80 m)	210 lb (95 kg)	--	Jul 29, 2011
Andy Garcia; LB	Recruit ratings: Scout: Rivals: (73)					
Aloyis Gray; QB/WR	Indianapolis, Indiana	Pike H.S.	6 ft 3 in (1.91 m)	165 lb (75 kg)	--	Sep 3, 2011
Aloyis Gray; QB/WR	Recruit ratings: Scout: Rivals: (74)					
Robert Gregory; QB	Chicago, Illinois	Simeon Career Academy	6 ft 3 in (1.91 m)	185 lb (84 kg)	4.7	Feb 3, 2012
Robert Gregory; QB	Recruit ratings: Scout: Rivals: (78)					
Paul Griggs; K	Charlotte, North Carolina	Charlotte Latin School	6 ft 0 in (1.83 m)	195 lb (88 kg)	--	Jun 23, 2011
Paul Griggs; K	Recruit ratings: Scout: Rivals: (77)					
Jimmy Herman; LB	Carmel, Indiana	Carmel H.S.	6 ft 3 in (1.91 m)	195 lb (88 kg)	--	Jul 23, 2011
Jimmy Herman; LB	Recruit ratings: Scout: Rivals: (72)					
Kingsley Ike; DE	Pflugerville, Texas	Hendrickson H.S.	6 ft 4 in (1.93 m)	230 lb (100 kg)	4.7	Dec 17, 2011
Kingsley Ike; DE	Recruit ratings: Scout: Rivals: (75)					
Jason King; OL	Little Rock, Arkansas	Pulaski Academy	6 ft 9 in (2.06 m)	295 lb (134 kg)	5.3	Dec 26, 2011
Jason King; OL	Recruit ratings: Scout: Rivals: (75)					
B.J. Knauf; WR	Lakeland, Florida	Santa Fe Catholic H.S.	5 ft 10 in (1.78 m)	173 lb (78 kg)	4.3	Jun 20, 2011
B.J. Knauf; WR	Recruit ratings: Scout: Rivals: (70)					
Greg Latta; DE	La Quinta, California	College of the Desert	6 ft 6 in (1.98 m)	265 lb (120 kg)	--	Oct 23, 2011
Greg Latta; DE	Recruit ratings: Scout: Rivals: (JC)					
Bilal Marshall; QB	Hialeah, Florida	Dade Christian School	6 ft 3 in (1.91 m)	170 lb (77 kg)	4.6	Dec 11, 2011
Bilal Marshall; QB	Recruit ratings: Scout: Rivals: (77)					
Thomas Meadows; K	Goochland, Virginia	Goochland H.S.	6 ft 0 in (1.83 m)	170 lb (77 kg)	--	Jun 22, 2011
Thomas Meadows; K	Recruit ratings: Scout: Rivals: (73)					
Ryan Morris; TE	Barnegat, New Jersey	Barnegat H.S.	6 ft 6 in (1.98 m)	241 lb (109 kg)	4.8	Jun 27, 2011
Ryan Morris; TE	Recruit ratings: Scout: Rivals: (76)					
Cameron Posey; WR	Delray Beach, Florida	American Heritage School	6 ft 2 in (1.88 m)	175 lb (79 kg)	--	Oct 10, 2011
Cameron Posey; WR	Recruit ratings: Scout: Rivals: (68)					
James Prince; OL	Southlake, Texas	Carroll H.S.	6 ft 6 in (1.98 m)	268 lb (122 kg)	5.2	Dec 26, 2011
James Prince; OL	Recruit ratings: Scout: Rivals: (74)					
Jordan Roos; OL	Celina, Texas	Celina H.S.	6 ft 6 in (1.98 m)	300 lb (140 kg)	5.2	Aug 14, 2011
Jordan Roos; OL	Recruit ratings: Scout: Rivals: (79)					
Jordan Shine; DB	Indianapolis, Indiana	Warren Central H.S.	6 ft 0 in (1.83 m)	185 lb (84 kg)	--	Apr 15, 2011
Jordan Shine; DB	Recruit ratings: Scout: Rivals: (75)					
Devin Smith; OL	Yuma, Arizona	Arizona Western College	6 ft 7 in (2.01 m)	315 lb (143 kg)	--	Sep 4, 2011
Devin Smith; OL	Recruit ratings: Scout: Rivals: (JC)					
Joey Warburg; OL	Louisville, Kentucky	Trinity H.S.	6 ft 5 in (1.96 m)	255 lb (116 kg)	--	Feb 1, 2012
Joey Warburg; OL	Recruit ratings: Scout: Rivals: (75)					
Ryan Watson; DE	Olney, Maryland	Our Lady of Good Counsel H.S.	6 ft 3 in (1.91 m)	270 lb (120 kg)	4.8	Dec 29, 2011
Ryan Watson; DE	Recruit ratings: Scout: Rivals: (79)					
Jordan Woods; WR	Ann Arbor, Michigan	Skyline H.S.	6 ft 3 in (1.91 m)	175 lb (79 kg)	--	Sep 7, 2011
Jordan Woods; WR	Recruit ratings: Scout: Rivals: (74)					
Overall recruit ranking: Scout: 51 (Without Robert Gregory) Rivals: 32 ESPN: NR
Note: In many cases, Scout, Rivals, 247Sports, On3, and ESPN may conflict in their listings of height and weight.; In these cases, the average was taken. ESPN grades are on a 100-point scale.; Sources: "2012 Purdue Football Commits". Scout.; "ESPN". ESPN.; "Scout.com Team Recruiting Rankings". Scout.; "2012 Team Ranking". Rivals.com.

== Schedule ==
The schedule is as follows:

Date	Time	Opponent	Site	TV	Result	Attendance
September 1	3:30 pm	No. 18 (FCS) Eastern Kentucky*	Ross–Ade Stadium; West Lafayette, IN	BTN	W 48–6	40,572
September 8	3:30 pm	at No. 22 Notre Dame*	Notre Dame Stadium; Notre Dame, IN (Shillelagh Trophy)	NBC	L 17–20	80,795
September 15	12:00 pm	Eastern Michigan*	Ross–Ade Stadium; West Lafayette, IN	BTN	W 54–16	40,217
September 29	3:15 pm	Marshall*	Ross–Ade Stadium; West Lafayette, IN	BTN	W 51–41	45,481
October 6	4:00 pm	Michigan	Ross–Ade Stadium; West Lafayette, IN	BTN	L 13–44	50,105
October 13	12:00 pm	Wisconsin^{†}	Ross–Ade Stadium; West Lafayette, IN	BTN	L 14–38	46,007
October 20	12:00 pm	at No. 7 Ohio State	Ohio Stadium; Columbus, OH	ABC/ESPN2	L 22–29 ^{OT}	105,290
October 27	3:30 pm	at Minnesota	TCF Bank Stadium; Minneapolis, MN	BTN	L 28–44	41,062
November 3	3:30 pm	Penn State	Ross–Ade Stadium; West Lafayette, IN	ESPNU	L 9–34	40,098
November 10	12:00 pm	at Iowa	Kinnick Stadium; Iowa City, IA	BTN	W 27–24	70,585
November 17	3:30 pm	at Illinois	Memorial Stadium; Champaign, IL (Purdue Cannon)	BTN	W 20–17	41,974
November 24	12:00 pm	Indiana	Ross–Ade Stadium; West Lafayette, IN (Old Oaken Bucket)	BTN	W 56–35	42,638
January 1	12:00 pm	vs. Oklahoma State*	Cotton Bowl; Dallas, TX (Heart of Dallas Bowl)	ESPNU	L 14–58	48,313
*Non-conference game; ^{†}Homecoming; Rankings from AP Poll released prior to game; All times are in Eastern time

== Game summaries ==
=== Vs. Eastern Kentucky ===
Purdue vs. Eastern Kentucky

Team	1	2	3	4	Total
#18 (FCS) Colonels	0	6	0	0	6
• Boilermakers	13	21	7	7	48

- Date: September 1
- Location: Ross–Ade Stadium
  West Lafayette, IN
- TV announcers (BTN): Matt Devlin, Glenn Mason and Jeremy Leman

Scoring summary
1	8:43	PUR	Gary Bush 4-yard pass from Robert Marve (kick blocked)	PUR 7-0
1	7:51	PUR	Landon Fletcher 34-yard interception return (Sam McCartney kick)	PUR 14-0
2	13:46	PUR	Kurt Freytag 7-yard run (Sam McCartney kick)	PUR 21-0
2	11:17	EKY	Matt Denham 30-yard run (kick blocked)	PUR 21-6
2	4:26	PUR	Antavian Edison 13-yard pass from Robert Marve (Sam McCartney kick)	PUR 28-6
2	1:19	PUR	Akeem Shavers 8-yard run (Sam McCartney kick)	PUR 35-6
3	2:59	PUR	Gabe Holmes 8-yard pass from Robert Marve (Paul Griggs kick)	PUR 42-6
4	1:54	PUR	Justin Sinz 15-yard pass from Rob Henry (Paul Griggs kick)	PUR 48-6

To open the season, Purdue hosted the Eastern Kentucky Colonels. This game was the first ever meeting between the two teams. This was coach Danny Hope's first ever game against a team of which he was formerly the head coach.

=== Vs. Notre Dame ===
Purdue at Notre Dame
(Shillelagh Trophy)

Team	1	2	3	4	Total
Boilermakers	0	7	0	10	17
• #22 Fighting Irish	0	7	10	3	20

- Date: September 8
- Location: Notre Dame Stadium
  Notre Dame, IN
- TV announcers (NBC): Tom Hammond, Mike Mayock and Alex Flanagan

Following its game against Eastern Kentucky, Purdue traveled to Notre Dame, IN and faced the Fighting Irish of Notre Dame. In the previous meeting, Notre Dame won 38–10.

=== Vs. Eastern Michigan ===
Purdue vs. Eastern Michigan

Team	1	2	3	4	Total
Eagles	0	9	0	7	16
• Boilermakers	13	20	7	14	54

- Date: September 15
- Location: Ross–Ade Stadium
  West Lafayette, IN
- TV announcers (Big Ten Network): Kevin Kugler, Chris Martin and Rebecca Haarlow

Following its game against Notre Dame, Purdue returned home to face the Eastern Michigan Eagles of the Mid-American Conference. In 1991, their most recent meeting, Purdue won 49–3.

=== Vs. Marshall ===
Purdue vs. Marshall

Team	1	2	3	4	Total
Thundering Herd	7	7	14	13	41
• Boilermakers	14	28	3	6	51

- Date: September 29
- Location: Ross–Ade Stadium
  West Lafayette, IN
- TV announcers (Big Ten Network): Eric Collins, Derek Rackley and Lisa Byington

Following its game against Eastern Michigan, Purdue stayed home to face the Marshall Thundering Herd of Conference USA. This was the first ever meeting between the two schools in a football game.

=== Vs. Michigan ===
Purdue vs. Michigan

Team	1	2	3	4	Total
• Wolverines	7	21	3	13	44
Boilermakers	0	10	0	3	13

- Date: October 6
- Location: Ross–Ade Stadium
  West Lafayette, IN
- Game start: 4:00 EST
- Elapsed time: 3:00
- Game attendance: 50,105
- Game weather: 48° Sunny
- Referee: Bill LeMonnier
- TV announcers (Big Ten Network): Eric Collins, Derek Rackley and Lisa Byington

After its game against Marshall, Purdue hosted the visiting Michigan Wolverines to open Big Ten Conference play with an out of division game. In the previous meeting, Michigan defeated Purdue and won by a score of 36–14.

=== Vs. Wisconsin ===
Purdue vs. Wisconsin

Team	1	2	3	4	Total
• Badgers	7	10	7	14	38
Boilermakers	7	0	0	7	14

- Date: October 13
- Location: Ross–Ade Stadium
  West Lafayette, IN
- Game start: 12:01 EST
- Elapsed time: 3:05
- Game attendance: 46,007
- Game weather: 59° Mostly cloudy
- Referee: Dennis Lipski

After its game against Michigan, Purdue hosted the Wisconsin Badgers to open up Leaders Division play. In the previous meeting, Wisconsin dominated Purdue and won by a score of 62–17.

=== Vs. Ohio State ===
Purdue at Ohio State

Team	1	2	3	4	OT	Total
Purdue	13	0	7	2	0	22
• #7 Ohio State	7	0	7	8	7	29

- Date: October 20
- Location: Ohio Stadium
  Columbus, OH
- Game start: 12:00 p.m.
- Elapsed time: 3:36
- Game attendance: 105,290
- Game weather: Cloudy, 51 °F (11 °C), Wind WSW 11 mph (18 km/h)
- Referee: Mike Cannon
- TV announcers (ABC): Beth Mowins, Joey Galloway

After its game against Wisconsin, Purdue traveled to Columbus to take on the Ohio State Buckeyes. In the previous meeting, Purdue upset Ohio State by a score of 26–23 in overtime.

=== Vs. Minnesota ===
Purdue at Minnesota

Team	1	2	3	4	Total
Boilermakers	7	0	14	7	28
• Golden Gophers	14	20	10	0	44

- Date: October 27
- Location: TCF Bank Stadium
  Minneapolis, MN
- Game start: 2:42 EST
- Elapsed time: 3:35
- Game attendance: 41,062
- Game weather: 42° Sunny
- Referee: Dave Witvoet

After its game against Ohio State, Purdue traveled to Minneapolis, Minnesota to play the Minnesota Golden Gophers. In the previous meeting, Purdue defeated Minnesota by a score of 45–17.

=== Vs. Penn State ===
Purdue vs. Penn State

Team	1	2	3	4	Total
• Nittany Lions	10	10	14	0	34
Boilermakers	3	0	0	6	9

- Date: November 3
- Location: Ross–Ade Stadium
  West Lafayette, IN
- Game start: 3:32 EST
- Elapsed time: 3:30
- Game attendance: 40,098
- Game weather: 38° Overcast
- Referee: Dennis Lipski
- TV announcers: ESPNU

After its game against Minnesota, Purdue returned home to play the Penn State Nittany Lions. In last years meeting, Penn State defeated Purdue 23–18.

=== Vs. Iowa ===
Purdue at Iowa

Team	1	2	3	4	Total
• Boilermakers	7	7	10	3	27
Hawkeyes	0	7	14	3	24

- Date: November 10
- Location: Kinnick Stadium
  Iowa City, IA
- Game start: 11:00 CST
- Elapsed time: 3:24
- Game attendance: 70,585
- Game weather: 63° Partly cloudy
- Referee: Dave Witvoet
- TV announcers: BTN
- Sources: ESPN

Scoring summary
1	5:30	Purdue	Akeem Shavers 3-yard run (Sam McCartney kick)	Purdue 7-0
2	9:43	Iowa	Damon Bullock 1-yard run (Mike Meyer kick)	Tie 7-7
2	4:43	Purdue	Gabe Holmes 9-yard pass from Robert Marve (Sam McCartney kick)	Purdue 14-7
3	10:23	Purdue	Sam McCartney 36-yard field goal	Purdue 17-7
3	4:58	Iowa	C.J. Fiedorowicz 5-yard pass from James Vandenberg (Mike Meyer kick)	Purdue 17-14
3	1:38	Purdue	Gary Bush 10-yard pass from Robert Marve (Sam McCartney kick)	Purdue 24-14
3	0:10	Iowa	Micah Hyde 9-yard fumble return (Mike Meyer kick)	Purdue 24-21
4	3:32	Iowa	Mike Meyer 24-yard field goal	Tie 24-24
4	0:00	Purdue	Paul Griggs 46-yard field goal	Purdue 27-24

After its game against Penn State, Purdue travels to Iowa City, Iowa to play the Iowa Hawkeyes. In last years meeting, Iowa defeated Purdue by a score of 31–21.

=== Vs. Illinois ===
Purdue at Illinois
(Purdue Cannon)

Team	1	2	3	4	Total
• Boilermakers	0	6	14	0	20
Fighting Illini	0	3	7	7	17

- Date: November 17
- Location: Memorial Stadium
  Champaign, IL
- Game start: 3:30 p.m. EST
- Sources: ESPN

After its game against Iowa, Purdue traveled to Champaign, Illinois to play the Illinois Fighting Illini. In last years meeting, Purdue defeated Illinois by a score of 21–14.

=== Vs. Indiana ===
Purdue vs. Indiana
(Old Oaken Bucket)

Team	1	2	3	4	Total
Hoosiers	7	14	7	7	35
• Boilermakers	14	0	21	21	56

- Date: November 24
- Location: Ross–Ade Stadium
  West Lafayette, IN
- Game start: 12:00 p.m. EST
- Sources: ESPN

Scoring summary
1	12:04	Indiana	Stephen Houston 51-yard run (Mitch Ewald kick)	Indiana 7-0
1	7:05	Purdue	Brandon Cottom 14-yard run (Sam McCartney kick)	Tie 7-7
1	1:13	Purdue	Antavian Edison 8-yard pass from Robert Marve (Sam McCartney kick)	Purdue 14-7
2	5:50	Indiana	Stephen Houston 8-yard run (Mitch Ewald kick)	Tie 14-14
2	2:33	Indiana	Stephen Houston 1-yard run (Mitch Ewald kick)	Indiana 21-14
3	11:18	Purdue	O.J. Ross 19-yard pass from Robert Marve (Sam McCartney kick)	Tie 21-21
3	7:44	Purdue	Rob Henry 1-yard run (Sam McCartney kick)	Purdue 28-21
3	3:54	Purdue	Gary Bush 25-yard pass from Robert Marve (Sam McCartney kick)	Purdue 35-21
3	2:30	Indiana	Cameron Coffman 1-yard run (Mitch Ewald kick)	Purdue 35-28
4	12:14	Indiana	Cody Latimer 6-yard pass from Cameron Coffman (Mitch Ewald kick)	Tie 35-35
4	10:40	Purdue	Akeem Shavers 73-yard pass from Robert Marve (Sam McCartney kick)	Purdue 42-35
4	7:55	Purdue	Akeem Shavers 26-yard pass from Robert Marve (Sam McCartney kick)	Purdue 49-35
4	6:14	Purdue	Akeem Shavers 1-yard run (Sam McCartney kick)	Purdue 56-35

After its game against Illinois, Purdue returned home to play the Indiana Hoosiers in the "Battle for the Old Oaken Bucket". In last years meeting, Purdue defeated Indiana by a score of 33–25.

=== Vs. Oklahoma State ===
Oklahoma State vs. Purdue
(Heart of Dallas Bowl)

Team	1	2	3	4	Total
Boilermakers	0	0	7	7	14
• Cowboys	14	14	17	13	58

- Date: January 1
- Location: Cotton Bowl
  Dallas, TX
- Game start: 12:04 p.m. ET EST
- Elapsed time: 3:19
- Game attendance: 48313
- Game weather: Cloudy
- Referee: Terry Leyden
- Television network: ESPNU

== Roster ==
2012 Purdue Boilermakers football team roster
Players
Coaches
Offense

Pos.	#	Name	Class
RB	2	Jonathan Curry	Fr
TE	3	Carlos Carvajal	Fr
WR	4	O. J. Ross	Jr
WR	6	Gary Bush	Jr
RB	7	Robert Gregory	Fr
WR	8	Raheem Mostert (C)	So
QB	9	Robert Marve	Sr
RB	11	Akeem Hunt	So
QB	12	Austin Appleby	Fr
WR	12	Tommie Thomas	Sr
WR	13	Antavian Edison	Sr
QB	14	Bilal Marshall	Fr
QB	15	Rob Henry	Jr
WR	16	Dolapo McCarthy	So
QB	17	Austin Parker	Fr
WR	17	Charles Torwudzo	So
WR	18	Camerson Posey	Fr
WR	19	Alyois Gray	Fr
QB	19	Caleb TerBush (C)	Sr
RB	20	Gavin Roberts	Sr
RB	22	Ishmael Aristide	Jr
RB	23	Ralph Bolden	Sr
RB	24	Akeem Shavers (C)	Sr
RB	25	Brandon Cottom	So
WR	33	Danny Anthrop	Fr
FB	40	Derek Jackson	Sr
FB	46	Kurt Freytag	Jr
OT	51	Justin Kitchens	Jr
C	52	Henry Lorenzen	Jr
OT	54	Jack DeBoef	So
G	56	Eric McDaniel	Jr
C	57	Robert Kugler	Fr
C	59	Cody Davis	Jr
OT	60	Chuck Ayres	Fr
OT	63	Patrick Bade	Jr
G	64	Kevin Pamphile	Jr
G	65	Kyle Harris	Fr
OL	66	Cameron Cermin	Fr
C	67	Peters Drey	Sr
OL	70	Jordan Roos	Fr
OL	71	Devin Smith	So
OL	72	Jason King	Fr
OL	73	J. J. Prince	Fr
G	74	Connor Snapp	Jr
OT	75	Josh Davis	So
G	76	Rick Schmeig	Sr
OL	77	Joey Warburg	Fr
OT	78	Trevor Foy	Jr
WR	80	Zack Sigman	Sr
TE	81	Sterling Carter	Jr
TE	82	Crosby Wright (C)	Sr
WR	83	B. J. Knauf	Fr
TE	84	Justin Sinz	So
TE	85	Ryan Morris	Fr
TE	86	Gabe Holmes	Jr
WR	87	Shane Mikesky	Fr
WR	88	Jordan Woods	Fr

Defense

Pos.	#	Name	Class
CB	1	Normando Harris	Jr
DB	2	Frankie Williams	Fr
DB	4	Taylor Richards	Fr
LB	5	Antwon Higgs	Jr
S	7	E. J. Johnson	So
DB	9	Anthony Brown	Fr
LB	10	Sean Robinson	Jr
LB	18	Nnamadi Ezenwa	Sr
CB	21	Ricardo Allen (C)	Jr
CB	26	Antoine Lewis	So
CB	28	Josh Johnson	Sr
LB	29	Jimmy Herman	Fr
S	29	Chris Quinn	Sr
LB	31	Armstead Williams	Fr
DB	32	Jordan Shine	Fr
S	34	Max Charlot	Sr
LB	36	Zack Heiniger	Sr
LB	38	Mike Lee	So
LB	39	Joe Gilliam	So
LB	40	Collin Link	So
LB	42	Andy James Garcia	Fr
S	44	Landon Feichter	So
LB	45	Will Lucas	Jr
LB	47	Ruben Ibarra	Jr
LB	48	Jules Williams	So
DT	55	Brandon Taylor	Jr
LB	58	Robert Maci	Sr
DE	61	Ryan Isaac	Jr
DE	80	Kingsley Ike	Fr
DE	84	Eric Mebane	Sr
DE	89	Jalani Phillips	So
DT	90	Bruce Gaston	Jr
DE	91	Greg Latta	Jr
DT	92	Ryan Watson	Fr
DT	93	Kawann Short (C)	Sr
DT	97	Michael Rouse III	Fr
DE	99	Ryan Russell	So

Special teams

Pos.	#	Name	Class
K	30	Thomas Meadows	Fr
K	36	Robert Harris	Jr
K	37	Paul Griggs	Fr
P	42	Cody Webster	Jr
K	43	Sam McCartney	Fr
LS	50	Jesse Schmitt	So

Head coach

- Danny Hope

Coordinators/assistant coaches

- Gary Nord (offensive coordinator / assistant head coach / quarterbacks)
- Tim Tibesar (defensive coordinator / linebackers coach)
- J. B. Gibboney (special teams coordinator)
- Cornell Jackson (running backs)
- Patrick Higgins (wide receivers)
- Shawn Clark (offensive line)
- Kevin Wolthausen (defensive line)
- Greg Burns (defensive backs)
- Don Landholm (outside linebackers)
- Kyle Smith (graduate assistant)
- Jules Montinar (graduate assistant)

Legend

- (C) Team captain
- (S) Suspended
- (I) Ineligible
- Injured
- Redshirt

Roster
Last update: July 30, 2012
