= Austin Appleby =

American gridiron football player and coach (born 1993)

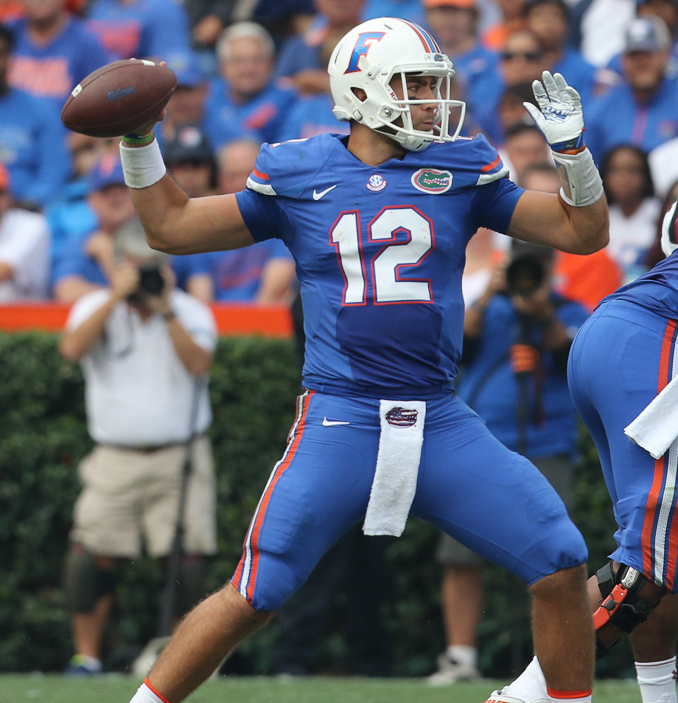
- Appleby with the Florida Gators in 2016

Purdue Boilermakers
- Title: Offensive analyst

Personal information
- Born: June 4, 1993 (age 33)
- Listed height: 6 ft 5 in (1.96 m)
- Listed weight: 239 lb (108 kg)

Career information
- Position: Quarterback
- High school: Hoover (North Canton, Ohio)
- College: Purdue (2012–2015); Florida (2016)
- NFL draft: 2017: undrafted

Career history

Playing
- Dallas Cowboys (2017)*; Orlando Apollos (2019); Winnipeg Blue Bombers (2020)*
- * Offseason or practice squad member only

Coaching
- Mount Union (2018) Quarterbacks coach & pass game coordinator; Central Michigan (2019) Offensive analyst – Quarterbacks; Missouri State (2020–2022) Wide receivers coach; UAB (2023–2024) Wide receivers coach; Purdue (2025–present) Assistant Quarterbacks Coach
- Stats at Pro Football Reference

Austin Michael Appleby (born June 4, 1993) is an American football coach and former quarterback. He was most recently the wide receivers coach for UAB. He played college football for the Purdue Boilermakers from 2012 to 2015 for coaches Danny Hope and Darrell Hazell, before graduate transferring to the Florida Gators and playing for coach Jim McElwain in 2016. He played in the Alliance of American Football in 2019. He was a consensus 3-star high school prospect as a senior.

== Early life ==
Appleby attended Hoover High School in North Canton, Ohio. While at Hoover, Appleby played three sports (baseball, basketball, and football) during his freshman and sophomore years. As a member of the varsity football team in 2009, Appleby served as a backup quarterback for the Vikings, who would go on to lose in the State Semi-Final game.

As a junior in 2010, Appleby was named the starting quarterback but eight weeks into the season, he suffered a torn ACL, ending his season. Despite his injury, Appleby was invited to the ESPN RISE Elite 11 Camp in 2011, after qualifying at a regional camp at Ohio State University.

Appleby was named the best in chalk talk during the camp. Following his Elite 11 performance, Appleby's recruiting picked up momentum, landing his first power conference scholarship offer from Louisville. Just a few days following the Louisville offer, Appleby was offered by Purdue, and Appleby made his commitment to the Boilermakers on June 29, 2011.

College recruiting
Name	Hometown	School	Height	Weight	40^{‡}	Commit date
Austin Appleby; QB	North Canton, Ohio	Hoover High School	6 ft 5 in (1.96 m)	228 lb (103 kg)	4.9	Jun 29, 2011
Austin Appleby; QB	Recruit ratings: Scout: Rivals: 247Sports: ESPN: (75)					
Overall recruit ranking: Scout: 62 (QB) Rivals: – (QB), – (OH), – (National) ESPN: 88 (QB), 76 (OH), 171 (Midwest)
Note: In many cases, Scout, Rivals, 247Sports, On3, and ESPN may conflict in their listings of height and weight.; In these cases, the average was taken. ESPN grades are on a 100-point scale.; Sources: "Purdue Football Commitment List (26)". Rivals.; "Purdue College Football Recruiting Commits". Scout.; "ESPN". ESPN.; "Scout.com Team Recruiting Rankings". Scout.; "2012 Team Ranking". Rivals.com.

== College career ==
=== Purdue ===
Appleby was redshirted as a true freshman in 2012. In 2013, he appeared in one game as a reserve. In 2014, Purdue had a quarterback position battle in fall practice, this time between Appleby, Danny Etling, and true freshman David Blough. Appleby pushed hard for the starting spot over the entrenched Etling, but fell just short and was named the backup on August 18. Etling would lead Purdue to a 2–3 record of the first five games of the season, before Darrell Hazell turned to Appleby to start Purdue's 6th game against Illinois. Appleby led Purdue to a 38–27 victory, Hazell's first Big Ten Conference victory.

On August 25, 2015, head coach Darrell Hazell named Appleby the starting quarterback for the opening game of the 2015 season. On September 22, 2015, it was announced that Appleby will be replaced as the starting quarterback in favor of redshirt freshman, David Blough. Appleby returned to his starting role when Blough was injured during the November 21, game at Iowa. Following the conclusion of the season, Appleby was given his release to explore transfer options as a graduate student.

=== Florida ===
On January 4, 2016, Appleby announced his decision to play his final year of college football at the University of Florida as a graduate transfer. Under head coach Jim McElwain, Appleby competed with Luke Del Rio for the starting quarterback position, and lost out to Del Rio. After an injury early in the season to Del Rio, Appleby started seven games for the Gators in the 2016 season. Despite finishing with a 4–3 record as a starter, Appleby helped lead Florida to an SEC East title and a berth in the 2016 SEC Championship Game. In the 2017 Outback Bowl and his last game as a Gator, Appleby passed for 222 yards in a 30–3 defeat of the Iowa Hawkeyes.

=== Statistics ===
Year	Team	Games			Passing							Rushing			
Year	Team	GP	GS	Record	Cmp	Att	Yds	Pct	TD	Int	Rtg	Att	Yds	Avg	TD
2012	Purdue	0	0	—	Redshirted										
2013	Purdue	1	0	0–0	5	6	68	83.3	1	0	233.5	0	0	0.0	0
2014	Purdue	10	7	1–6	144	272	1,449	52.9	10	11	101.7	61	198	3.2	5
2015	Purdue	5	4	1–3	119	207	1,260	57.5	8	8	113.6	56	92	1.6	4
2016	Florida	9	7	4–3	127	209	1,447	60.8	10	7	128.0	41	−45	−1.1	0
Career		25	18	6–12	395	694	4,224	56.9	29	26	114.3	158	245	1.6	9

== Professional career ==
=== Dallas Cowboys ===
Appleby was signed as an undrafted free agent by the Dallas Cowboys after the 2017 NFL draft on May 12. On June 5, he was waived and was replaced with quarterback Zac Dysert.

=== Orlando Apollos ===
In 2018, he signed with the San Antonio Commanders of the Alliance of American Football. On November 27, Appleby was selected by the Orlando Apollos in the third round of the AAF QB Draft. He was a backup behind Garrett Gilbert until the league folded in April 2019.

Appleby tried out for the XFL in a summer showcase on July 3, 2019, but was not selected in the 2020 XFL draft in October 2019.

=== Winnipeg Blue Bombers ===
Appleby signed a futures contract for the 2020 CFL season with the Winnipeg Blue Bombers on November 1, 2019. He retired from playing professional football on March 18, 2020.

== Coaching career ==
Appleby was hired by Central Michigan as a quality control coach after the AAF folded in April 2019. He resigned from his position after the 2019 season, to sign with the Blue Bombers. On March 18, 2020, Appleby accepted the wide receivers assistant coach position at Missouri State University, where he remained for three years. In December 2022, he was hired as the wide receivers coach at the University of Alabama at Birmingham. Appleby had been coached by UAB head coach Trent Dilfer when he was an Elite 11 contestant in high school. On December 5, 2024, Dilfer announced that Appleby would not be retained, as UAB made several changes to their coaching staff after a disappointing season.
