= Adam Replogle =

American football player (born 1990)

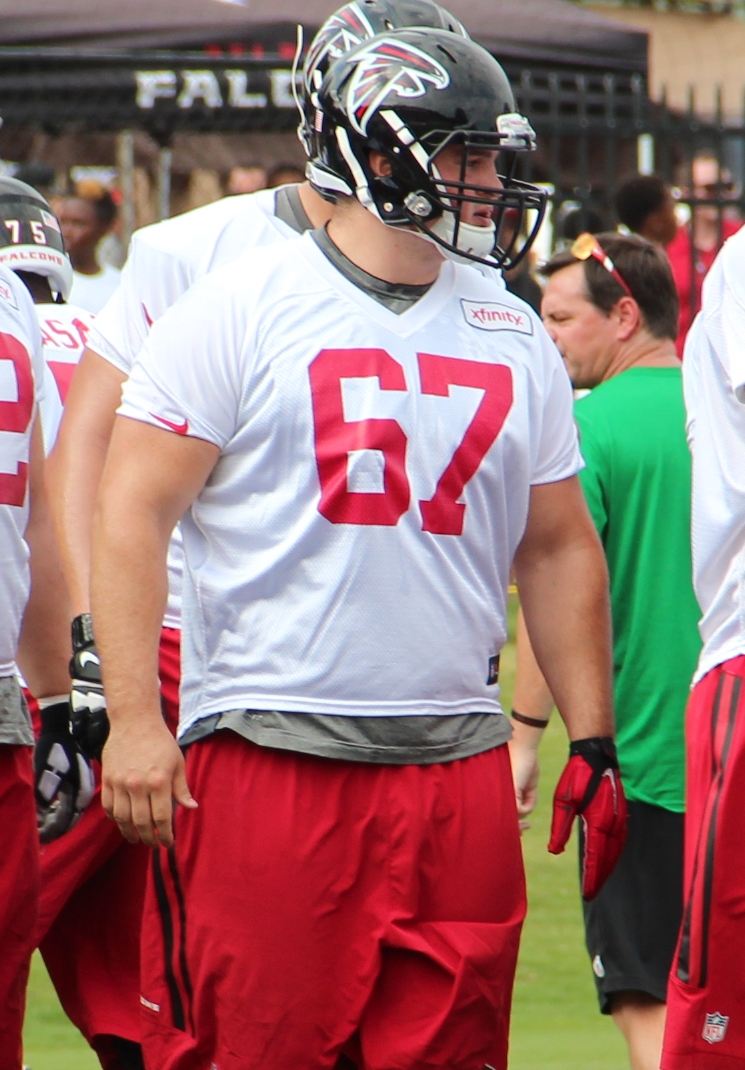

No. 67
- Position: Offensive guard

Personal information
- Born: October 10, 1990 (age 36); Centerville, Ohio, U.S.
- Listed height: 6 ft 3 in (1.91 m)
- Listed weight: 294 lb (133 kg)

Career information
- High school: Centerville
- College: Indiana
- NFL draft: 2013: undrafted

Career history
- Atlanta Falcons (2013–2015)

Awards and highlights
- Second-team All-Big Ten (2012)
- Stats at Pro Football Reference

Adam Replogle (born October 10, 1990) is an American former professional football player for the Atlanta Falcons of the National Football League (NFL). He played college football as a defensive tackle for the Indiana Hoosiers. He converted to an offensive guard as a professional player.

== Indiana ==
Replogle attended Indiana University Bloomington and played football as a defensive tackle for the Hoosiers. He started 47 consecutive games for the Hoosiers from 2009 to 2012, missing the start only in the first game of his freshman season. His 47 starts is an Indiana school record. He closed his collegiate career with 184 tackles, 15 sacks, 28.5 tackles for loss (110), three forced fumbles and one fumble recovery. As a senior in 2012, he was selected both as a team captain and as the team's most valuable player. He was also named a first-team Academic All-American at the end of the 2012 season. In 2017, the Indianapolis Star named him one of the 25 best football players of the previous 25 years for Indiana University.

== Professional football ==
Repologle was signed as an undrafted free agent by the Atlanta Falcons in April 2013. He was cut by the Falcons during training camp but eventually signed on as a member of the practice squad in September 2014. Replogle was with the Falcons again in the 2015 off-season but did not make the final cut as the Falcons waived-injured him on September 5, 2015.
