= Larry Black (American football) =

American football player and coach (born 1989)

Current position
- Title: Defensive tackles coach
- Team: Michigan
- Conference: Big Ten

Biographical details
- Born: December 1, 1989 (age 36); Cincinnati, Ohio, U.S.
- Education: Indiana (2008–2012)

Playing career
- 2013–2014: Cincinnati Bengals
- Position: Defensive tackle

Coaching career (HC unless noted)
- 2015: Carthage (DL)
- 2016–2017: Toledo (GA)
- 2018: Notre Dame (GA)
- 2019–2021: Toledo (DL)
- 2022–2025: Vanderbilt (DL)
- 2026–present: Michigan (DT)

Accomplishments and honors

Awards
- Freshman All-American (2009)

Larry Black Jr. (born December 1, 1989) is an American college football coach and former player, currently the defensive tackles coach at the University of Michigan. He previously coached at Carthage College, Notre Dame, Toledo, and most recently at Vanderbilt.

== Professional career ==
=== Cincinnati Bengals ===
Black signed with the Cincinnati Bengals as an undrafted free agent on April 30, 2013. On July 31, Black suffered a leg fracture and dislocated his ankle in practice. He was waived on August 7, and after clearing waivers he was transferred to the Bengals injured reserve list. The team waived Black a year later on August 25, 2014.
