= 2011 Ohio State Buckeyes football team =

American college football season

2011 Ohio State Buckeyes football

Gator Bowl, L 17–24 vs. Florida
- Conference: Big Ten Conference
- Leaders Division
- Record: 6–7 (3–5 Big Ten)
- Head coach: Luke Fickell (interim)
- Offensive coordinator: Jim Bollman (11th season)
- Offensive scheme: Multiple
- Defensive coordinator: Jim Heacock (7th season)
- Base defense: 4–3
- MVP: Dan Herron
- Captains: Mike Brewster; Dan Herron; Andrew Sweat; John Simon
- Home stadium: Ohio Stadium

2011 Big Ten Conference football standings
| | Conf. | | | Overall |
| Team | W | | L | W | | L |
|---|---|---|---|---|---|---|
Legends Division
| No. 11 Michigan State x | 7 | – | 1 | 11 | – | 3 |
| No. 12 Michigan % | 6 | – | 2 | 11 | – | 2 |
| No. 24 Nebraska | 5 | – | 3 | 9 | – | 4 |
| Iowa | 4 | – | 4 | 7 | – | 6 |
| Northwestern | 3 | – | 5 | 6 | – | 7 |
| Minnesota | 2 | – | 6 | 3 | – | 9 |
Leaders Division
| No. 10 Wisconsin xy$ | 6 | – | 2 | 11 | – | 3 |
| Penn State x | 6 | – | 2 | 9 | – | 4 |
| Purdue | 4 | – | 4 | 7 | – | 6 |
| Ohio State | 3 | – | 5 | 6 | – | 7 |
| Illinois | 2 | – | 6 | 7 | – | 6 |
| Indiana | 0 | – | 8 | 1 | – | 11 |
Championship: Wisconsin 42, Michigan State 39
$ – BCS representative as conference champion; % – BCS at-large representative; x – Division champion/co-champions; y – Championship game participant; Rankings from AP Poll

The 2011 Ohio State Buckeyes football team was an American football team that represented the Ohio State University as a member of the Big Ten Conference during the 2011 NCAA Division I FBS football season. The team was led by interim head coach Luke Fickell who took over after the resignation of Jim Tressel amid the Ohio State University football scandal. The Buckeyes compiled a 6–7 record (3–5 in conference games), finished in fourth place in the Big Ten's Leaders Division, and outscored opponents by a total of 318 to 273. Against ranked opponents, the Buckeyes defeated No. 16 Illinois and No. 12 Wisconsin and lost to No. 14 Nebraska, No. 21 Penn State, and No. 17 Michigan. They concluded the season with a 24–17 loss to unranked Florida in the 2012 Gator Bowl. The Buckeyes were unranked in the final Coaches and AP polls. It was the first time Ohio State had finished the season with a losing record since 1988. As of 2025, this is the most recent season where Ohio State finished with a losing record.

The Buckeyes gained an average of 191.2 rushing yards and 127.0 passing yards per game. On defense, they gave up 141.5 rushing yards and 182.0 passing yards per game. Quarterback Braxton Miller led the team in both passing (1,159 passing yards, 54.1% completion percentage) and rushing (715 yards, 4.5 yards per carry). The team's other statistical leaders included wide receiver Devin Smith (14 catches for 294 yards), kicker Drew Basil (84 points scored, 36 of 37 extra points, 16 of 19 field goals), and defensive back C. J. Barnett (49 solo tackles, 75 total tackles). No Ohio State players won first-team All-America honors. John Simon received first-team honors as a defensive lineman on the 2011 All-Big Ten Conference football team.

The team played its home games at Ohio Stadium in Columbus, Ohio.

== Schedule ==
| Date | Time | Opponent | Rank | Site | TV | Result | Attendance |
|---|---|---|---|---|---|---|---|
| September 3 | 12:00 p.m. | Akron* | No. 18 | Ohio Stadium; Columbus, OH | ESPN | W 42–0 | 105,001 |
| September 10 | 12:00 p.m. | Toledo* | No. 15 | Ohio Stadium; Columbus, OH | BTN | W 27–22 | 105,016 |
| September 17 | 7:30 p.m. | at Miami (FL)* | No. 17 | Sun Life Stadium; Miami Gardens, FL | ESPN | L 6–24 | 66,279 |
| September 24 | 3:30 p.m. | Colorado* | | Ohio Stadium; Columbus, OH | ABC, ESPN2 | W 37–17 | 105,096 |
| October 1 | 3:30 p.m. | Michigan State | | Ohio Stadium; Columbus, OH | ABC | L 7–10 | 105,306 |
| October 8 | 8:00 p.m. | at No. 14 Nebraska | | Memorial Stadium; Lincoln, NE | ABC | L 27–34 | 85,426 |
| October 15 | 3:30 p.m. | at No. 16 Illinois | | Memorial Stadium; Champaign, IL (Illibuck) | ABC, ESPN | W 17–7 | 55,229 |
| October 29 | 8:00 p.m. | No. 12 Wisconsin^{†} | | Ohio Stadium; Columbus, OH | ESPN | W 33–29 | 105,511 |
| November 5 | 12:00 p.m. | Indiana | | Ohio Stadium; Columbus, OH | BTN | W 34–20 | 105,159 |
| November 12 | 12:00 p.m. | at Purdue | | Ross–Ade Stadium; West Lafayette, IN | BTN | L 23–26 ^{OT} | 43,334 |
| November 19 | 3:30 p.m. | No. 21 Penn State | | Ohio Stadium; Columbus, OH (rivalry) | ABC, ESPN | L 14–20 | 105,493 |
| November 26 | 12:00 p.m. | at No. 12 Michigan | | Michigan Stadium; Ann Arbor, MI (rivalry) | ABC | L 34–40 | 114,432 |
| January 2, 2012 | 1:00 p.m. | vs. Florida* | | EverBank Field; Jacksonville, FL (Gator Bowl) | ESPN2 | L 17–24 | 61,312 |
*Non-conference game; ^{†}Homecoming; Rankings from AP Poll released prior to the game; All times are in Eastern time

== Rankings ==
Ranking movements Legend: ██ Increase in ranking ██ Decrease in ranking — = Not ranked RV = Received votes
| | Week | | | | | | | | | | | | | | | |
| Poll | Pre | 1 | 2 | 3 | 4 | 5 | 6 | 7 | 8 | 9 | 10 | 11 | 12 | 13 | 14 | Final |
|---|---|---|---|---|---|---|---|---|---|---|---|---|---|---|---|---|
| AP | 18 | 15 | 17 | RV | RV | — | — | — | — | RV | RV | — | — | — | — | |
| Coaches | 16 | 15 | 16 | RV | RV | RV | — | — | — | RV | RV | — | — | — | — | |
| Harris | Not released | | | | | | — | — | — | RV | RV | — | — | — | — | Not released |
| BCS | Not released | | | | | | | — | — | — | — | — | — | — | — | Not released |

== Before the season ==
The 2010 Ohio State team posted a 12–1 record, including a victory over No. 8 Arkansas in the Sugar Bowl. However, all 12 victories were vacated by the NCAA as part of its investigation into the Ohio State University football scandal. Also as a result of the scandal, Ohio State played the first five games of the season without five players: Terrelle Pryor, DeVier Posey, Mike Adams, Solomon Thomas, and Boom Herron. These players had sold memorabilia to the owner of a Columbus tattoo parlor. On March 8, 2011, it was reported that Tressel knew about it as early as April 2010 through an anonymous e-mail. As of result, Tressel received a two-game suspension for failing to notify authorities of the players' wrongdoings. Tressel later decided to sit out the first five games with the five players. On May 30, 2011, Tressel resigned as head coach. Assistant head coach Luke Fickell, who was to take over during Tressel's suspension, was named interim head coach. On June 8, returning starting quarterback Terrelle Pryor announced his intention to forgo his senior season, "in the best interest of [his] teammates," in light of his suspension and ongoing investigation by the NCAA.

== Game summaries ==
=== Akron ===
Akron at #18 Ohio State

| Team | 1 | 2 | 3 | 4 | Total |
|---|---|---|---|---|---|
| Akron | 0 | 0 | 0 | 0 | 0 |
| • #18 Ohio State | 7 | 14 | 7 | 14 | 42 |

- Date: September 3
- Location: Ohio Stadium
  Columbus, OH
- Game start: 12:00 p.m. EDT
- Elapsed time: 3:12
- Game attendance: 105,001
- Game weather: Clear, 93 °F (34 °C), Wind W 3 mph (4.8 km/h)
- Referee: Dennis Lipski
- TV announcers (ESPN): Dave Pasch (Play-by-play), Urban Meyer (Color), Chris Spielman (Color) & Quint Kessenich (Sideline)

Ohio State's first game under Luke Fickell began with an opening drive defensive stop and a touchdown run by starting quarterback Joe Bauserman. Both teams struggled on offense through the first quarter, with Ohio State leading, 7–0. Midway through the second quarter, the Buckeyes put together a 12-play drive that concluded in a touchdown pass from Bauserman to Jake Stoneburner. Before the end of the half, Ohio State scored on another pass from Bauserman to Stoneburner. Ohio State led, 21–0, at halftime. The heat, reaching almost 100 °F (38 °C), caused problems for the players, referees, band members, and fans. In the third quarter, Bauserman and Soneburner connected for their third touchdown, extending the Buckeyes' lead to 28–0. Freshman quarterback Braxton Miller took most of the offensive snaps for the remainder of the game, passing for 130 yards and a touchdown. Ohio State won the game, 42–0.

Scoring summary

| Quarter | Time | Drive | | | Team | Scoring information | Score | |
| Quarter | Time | Plays | Yards | TOP | Team | Scoring information | AKRON | OSU |
|---|---|---|---|---|---|---|---|---|
| 1 | 7:25 | 8 | 74 | 3:48 | Ohio State | Joe Bauserman 15-yard run (Drew Basil kick) | 0 | 7 |
| 2 | 5:45 | 12 | 65 | 5:35 | Ohio State | Jake Stoneburner 28-yard pass from Joe Bauserman (Drew Basil kick) | 0 | 14 |
| 2 | 1:21 | 4 | 35 | 1:20 | Ohio State | Jake Stoneburner 11-yard pass from Joe Bauserman (Drew Basil kick) | 0 | 21 |
| 3 | 10:57 | 8 | 51 | 4:03 | Ohio State | Jake Stoneburner 2-yard pass from Joe Basuerman (Drew Basil kick) | 0 | 28 |
| 4 | 14:26 | 6 | 59 | 2:27 | Ohio State | Devin Smith 14-yard pass from Braxton Miller (Drew Basil kick) | 0 | 35 |
| 4 | 5:51 | 4 | 38 | 1:35 | Ohio State | Rod Smith 2-yard run (Drew Basil kick) | 0 | 42 |
| "TOP" = time of possession. For other American football terms, see Glossary of American football. | | | | | | | 0 | 42 |

=== Toledo ===
Toledo at #15 Ohio State

| Team | 1 | 2 | 3 | 4 | Total |
|---|---|---|---|---|---|
| Toledo | 15 | 0 | 7 | 0 | 22 |
| • #15 Ohio State | 7 | 14 | 6 | 0 | 27 |

- Date: September 10
- Location: Ohio Stadium
  Columbus, OH
- Game start: 12:00 p.m. EDT
- Elapsed time: 3:25
- Game attendance: 105,016
- Game weather: Partly Cloudy, 72 °F (22 °C), Wind WNW 3 mph (4.8 km/h)
- Referee: Alex Kemp
- TV announcers (BTN): Tom Hart (Play-by-play), Derek Rackley (Color) & Lisa Byington (Sideline)

On September 10, Ohio State defeated Toledo, 27–22. In the first quarter, Joe Bauserman threw a touchdown pass to Jake Stoneburnerthe year. Still in the first quarter, Toledo blocked a punt and scored a touchdown – the first points Toledo scored against Ohio State in three games.) At the end of the first quarter, Toledo receiver Eric Page had 66-yard touchdown reception, giving Toledo a 15–7 lead. Toledo committed 14 penalties on the day for 109 yards. Heading into the second quarter, Ohio State scored on a 36 touchdown run from Carlos Hyde and a 45-yard punt return from Chris Fields. After a sloppy first half by both teams, Ohio State went into halftime with a 21–15 lead. Ohio State again started off the second half slow, allowing the Rockets to score a touchdown on their opening drive of the half, and allowing them to retake the lead, 22–21. The one-point Toledo lead held up for most of the third quarter, until another touchdown run by Hyde, and a subsequently missed two-point conversion, gave Ohio State a five-point, 27–22 lead. Neither team scored in the fourth quarter. The game came down to a final play, with a Toledo fourth and six on the Ohio State 17. Terrance Owens was unable to complete the pass, coming five yards short and the Buckeyes were able to escape with a victory.

Scoring summary

| Quarter | Time | Drive | | | Team | Scoring information | Score | |
| Quarter | Time | Plays | Yards | TOP | Team | Scoring information | TOLEDO | OSU |
|---|---|---|---|---|---|---|---|---|
| 1 | 11:45 | 7 | 67 | 3:15 | Ohio State | Jake Stoneburner 26-yard pass from Joe Bauserman (Drew Basil kick) | 0 | 7 |
| 1 | 7:07 | 1 | 1 | 0:06 | Toledo | Eric Page 6-yard pass from Austin Dantin (Eric Page to Hank Keighley pass) | 8 | 7 |
| 1 | 2:18 | 2 | 70 | 0:53 | Toledo | Eric Page 66-yard pass from Terrance Owens (Ryan Casano kick) | 15 | 7 |
| 2 | 8:02 | 3 | 42 | 1:34 | Ohio State | Carlos Hyde 36-yard run (Drew Basil kick) | 15 | 14 |
| 2 | 0:46 | | | | Ohio State | Chris Fields 69-yard punt return (Drew Basil kick) | 15 | 21 |
| 3 | 12:56 | 5 | 60 | 2:04 | Toledo | Adonis Thomas 4-yard run (Ryan Casano kick) | 22 | 21 |
| 3 | 3:17 | 7 | 55 | 2:45 | Ohio State | Carlos Hyde 3-yard run (pass failed) | 22 | 27 |
| "TOP" = time of possession. For other American football terms, see Glossary of American football. | | | | | | | 22 | 27 |

=== Miami (FL) ===
#17 Ohio State at Miami (FL)

| Team | 1 | 2 | 3 | 4 | Total |
|---|---|---|---|---|---|
| #17 Ohio State | 0 | 6 | 0 | 0 | 6 |
| • Miami (FL) | 14 | 3 | 0 | 7 | 24 |

- Date: September 17
- Location: Sun Life Stadium
  Miami Gardens, FL
- Game start: 7:30 p.m. EDT
- Elapsed time: 3:00
- Game attendance: 66,279
- Game weather: Mostly Cloudy, 83 °F (28 °C), Wind ENE 10 mph (16 km/h)
- Referee: Bill LeMonnier
- TV announcers (ESPN): Brad Nessler (Play-by-play), Todd Blackledge (Color) & Holly Rowe (Sideline)

Ohio State's first road game of the season took them to south Florida for a rematch against the Miami Hurricanes who they faced in the 2010 season, as well as the 2003 Fiesta Bowl, beating them both times. The game did not start well for the Buckeyes, with a bad opening offensive drive, giving Miami good field position. The Hurricanes quickly drove down the field 63 yards and scored their first points of the game on a Jacory Harris touchdown pass. Later in the quarter, Miami again drove down the field for another Harris touchdown pass, giving the Hurricanes a 14–0 lead at the end of the first quarter. The second quarter saw the momentum swing in favor of Ohio State, with two drives heading deep into Miami territory, however, once in the red zone, the Buckeyes were unable to capitalize and had to settle for two short range field goals by Drew Basil, bringing them closer in the games and giving Miami only a 14–6 lead. However a field goal at the end of the first half gave Miami a two-possession lead heading into halftime. The second half of the game saw little offense, with both the Buckeyes' defense dominating the Hurricanes and keeping them out of Ohio State territory, as well at the Buckeye offense continuing to struggle to get any kind of rhythm. Miami was able to score a touchdown with 0:33 remaining in the game, giving them a 24–6 lead—the final score of the game. The game was the first non-conference loss since the September 12, 2009 loss against the University of Southern California.

Scoring summary

| Quarter | Time | Drive | | | Team | Scoring information | Score | |
| Quarter | Time | Plays | Yards | TOP | Team | Scoring information | OSU | MIA |
|---|---|---|---|---|---|---|---|---|
| 1 | 12:47 | 4 | 63 | 1:19 | Miami (FL) | Allen Hurns 3-yard pass from Jacory Harris (Jake Wieclaw kick) | 0 | 7 |
| 1 | 5:12 | 11 | 53 | 5:58 | Miami (FL) | Allen Hurns 3-yard pass from Jacory Harris (Jake Wieclaw kick) | 0 | 14 |
| 2 | 6:28 | 15 | 64 | 6:49 | Ohio St | Drew Basil 22-yard field goal | 3 | 14 |
| 2 | 3:40 | 4 | 16 | 1:56 | Ohio St | Drew Basil 24-yard field goal | 6 | 14 |
| 2 | 0:00 | 10 | 64 | 3:40 | Miami (FL) | Jake Wieclaw 25-yard field goal | 6 | 17 |
| 4 | 0:33 | 14 | 69 | 8:48 | Miami (FL) | Mike James 1-yard run (Jake Wieclaw kick) | 6 | 24 |
| "TOP" = time of possession. For other American football terms, see Glossary of American football. | | | | | | | 6 | 24 |

=== Colorado ===
Colorado at Ohio State

| Team | 1 | 2 | 3 | 4 | Total |
|---|---|---|---|---|---|
| Colorado | 0 | 7 | 3 | 7 | 17 |
| • Ohio State | 10 | 10 | 14 | 3 | 37 |

- Date: September 24
- Location: Ohio Stadium
  Columbus, OH
- Game start: 3:30 p.m. EDT
- Elapsed time: 3:16
- Game attendance: 105,069
- Game weather: Partly Cloudy, 64 °F (18 °C), Wind NE 4 mph (6.4 km/h)
- Referee: Dan Capron
- TV announcers (ABC/ESPN2): Mike Patrick (Play-by-play) & Craig James (Color)

Ohio State came off their previous week's loss to Miami with a home game against the Colorado Buffaloes. For the first time during the season, freshman quarterback Braxton Miller received the start, only the third time Ohio State started a freshman at that position. The second offensive drive of the first quarter saw the Buckeyes move the ball 43 yards down the field and score on a Jordan Hall touchdown run. A Drew Basil field goal later on in the quarter gave Ohio State a 10–0 lead early on in the game. Colorado's special teams, as well as the number of penalties which they drew, allowed Ohio State to have relatively good field position throughout the game, averaging a start around their 50-yard line. Ohio State took advantage of the field position with a touchdown pass from Miller to Devin Smith, giving Ohio State a 17–0 lead. Colorado eventually drove down the field on their next possession and scored on an 11-yard touchdown reception, narrowing the score to 17–7. A field goal before the end of the half allowed Ohio State to go into the locker room with a 20–7 lead. The third quarter saw a back and forth between the two teams, with Ohio State still dominating. Another Miller to Smith touchdown reception put Ohio State up 27–7, while Colorado continued to stay in the game with an Oliver field goal. Basil would kick a field goal to end the third quarter, as well as starting the fourth, and gave Ohio State a 37–10 lead late in the game. A late Colorado touchdown was the last score of the game, as the favored Buckeyes beat Colorado 37–17, rebounding after their previous week's loss to Miami, as Ohio State moved to 3–1 on the season.

Scoring summary

| Quarter | Time | Drive | | | Team | Scoring information | Score | |
| Quarter | Time | Plays | Yards | TOP | Team | Scoring information | CU | OSU |
|---|---|---|---|---|---|---|---|---|
| 1 | 8:27 | 6 | 43 | 3:53 | Ohio State | Jordan Hall 1-yard run (Drew Basil kick) | 0 | 7 |
| 1 | 4:49 | 5 | 11 | 1:39 | Ohio State | Drew Basil 28-yard field goal | 0 | 10 |
| 2 | 7:53 | 6 | 46 | 3:10 | Ohio State | Devin Smith 32-yard pass from Braxton Miller (Drew Basil kick) | 0 | 17 |
| 2 | 2:44 | 10 | 83 | 5:09 | Colorado | Toney Clemons 11-yard pass from Tyler Hansen (Will Oliver kick) | 7 | 17 |
| 2 | 0:03 | 1 | 9 | 0:09 | Ohio State | Drew Basil 18-yard field goal | 7 | 20 |
| 3 | 9:04 | 6 | 50 | 3:21 | Ohio State | Devin Smith 17-yard pass from Braxton Miller (Drew Basil kick) | 7 | 27 |
| 3 | 4:47 | 8 | 60 | 4:17 | Colorado | Will Oliver 47-yard field goal | 10 | 27 |
| 3 | 4:29 | 1 | 5 | 0:18 | Ohio State | Carlos Hyde 5-yard run (Drew Basil kick) | 10 | 34 |
| 4 | 11:42 | 11 | 50 | 4:55 | Ohio State | Drew Basil 47-yard field goal | 10 | 37 |
| 4 | 3:31 | 13 | 91 | 5:04 | Colorado | Tyler McCulloch 14-yard pass from Tyler Hansen (Will Oliver kick) | 17 | 37 |
| "TOP" = time of possession. For other American football terms, see Glossary of American football. | | | | | | | 17 | 37 |

=== Michigan State ===
Michigan State at Ohio State

| Team | 1 | 2 | 3 | 4 | Total |
|---|---|---|---|---|---|
| • Michigan State | 7 | 0 | 0 | 3 | 10 |
| Ohio State | 0 | 0 | 0 | 7 | 7 |

- Date: October 1
- Location: Ohio Stadium
  Columbus, OH
- Game start: 3:30 p.m. EDT
- Elapsed time: 3:11
- Game attendance: 105,306
- Game weather: Overcast, 48 °F (9 °C), Wind NNW 10 mph (16 km/h)
- Referee: Scott McElwee
- TV announcers (ABC): Sean McDonough (Play-by-play), Matt Millen (Color) & Eamon McAnaney (Sideline)

On a cold rainy day in Columbus, Ohio, the Ohio State Buckeyes opened their 2011 Big Ten Conference campaign against the Michigan State Spartans. Both teams were unable to score on their opening possessions of the ballgame. Michigan State opened the scoring with a 33-yard pass from Kirk Cousins to B.J. Cunningham, giving the Spartans a 7–0 lead. Throughout the first quarter both teams would trade field position as both defenses stepped up to the occasion to stop the opposing team. Michigan State found themselves deep in Ohio State territory late in the second quarter, however, an interception by Cousins, one of three Michigan State turnovers on the day, would allow Ohio State to enter halftime only down by a score of 7–0. The rain and windy conditions made the game much more of a defensive battle than expected. Throughout the third quarter and the rest of the second half, both teams continued to trade field position and come up with stops on defense. A missed 51-yard field goal by Dan Conroy allowed the Buckeyes and their struggling offense to have a shot at tying the game, however, with Joe Bauserman replacing Braxton Miller at QB, Ohio State was unable to move the ball. Michigan State extended their lead by 3 with a 50-yard field goal from Conroy, giving the Spartans a 10–0 advantage. A late touchdown by the Buckeyes would do little to help their effort as Ohio State went on to lose the game 10–7. This was Ohio State's first 0–1 start in Big Ten play since 2004, as well as their first loss to Michigan State since 1999.

Scoring summary

| Quarter | Time | Drive | | | Team | Scoring information | Score | |
| Quarter | Time | Plays | Yards | TOP | Team | Scoring information | MSU | OSU |
|---|---|---|---|---|---|---|---|---|
| 1 | 7:44 | 5 | 65 | 2:18 | Michigan State | B.J. Cunningham 33-yard pass from Kirk Cousins (Dan Conroy kick) | 7 | 0 |
| 4 | 10:35 | 4 | 7 | 1:15 | Michigan State | Dan Conroy 50-yard field goal | 10 | 0 |
| 4 | 0:10 | 7 | 62 | 1:41 | Ohio State | Evan Spencer 33-yard pass from Joe Bauserman (Drew Basil kick) | 10 | 7 |
| "TOP" = time of possession. For other American football terms, see Glossary of American football. | | | | | | | 10 | 7 |

=== Nebraska ===
Ohio State at #14 Nebraska

| Team | 1 | 2 | 3 | 4 | Total |
|---|---|---|---|---|---|
| Ohio State | 10 | 10 | 7 | 0 | 27 |
| • #14 Nebraska | 3 | 3 | 14 | 14 | 34 |

- Date: October 8
- Location: Memorial Stadium
  Lincoln, NE
- Game start: 8:00 p.m. EDT
- Elapsed time: 3:14
- Game attendance: 85,426
- Game weather: Overcast, 70 °F (21 °C), Wind SSE 7 mph (11 km/h)
- Referee: John O'Neill
- TV announcers (ABC): Sean McDonough (Play-by-play), Matt Millen (Color) & Heather Cox (Sideline)

In the first match up between the Buckeyes and Cornhuskers since the 1950s, Ohio State went into Lincoln hoping to win and rebound after their previous week's loss to Michigan State. Ohio State struggling offense came out with some fire, driving down the field on their first drive for a Drew Basil field goal, giving Ohio State an early 3–0. With Nebraska kicking a field goal a few minutes later, the game was tied midway through the first quarter at 3–3. A Braxton Miller to Jake Stoneburner touchdown at the end of the quarter gave Ohio State a 10–3 lead and the momentum. The second quarter continued the Ohio State dominance with a 63-yard touchdown run from Carlos Hyde and an exchange of field goals between the two teams, allowing the Buckeyes to go into halftime with a 20–6 lead. The second half of the game began very well for the Buckeyes with another Hyde touchdown, giving Ohio State their largest lead at 27–6. However, a Braxton Miller fumble, which allowed Nebraska to score their first touchdown of the game in the third quarter, as well as an ankle injury by Miller, eventually gave the Cornhuskers the momentum back down the stretch of the game. Another Nebraska touchdown at the end of the third quarter allowed the Cornhuskers to cut it to a 7-point game, 27–20, going into the fourth quarter. Two fourth-quarter touchdowns, both by Rex Burkhead, allowed Nebraska to receive their first lead of the night, pushing them to their first-ever Big Ten victory, and the largest comeback in school history. With the loss, Ohio State dropped to 3–3 and 0–2 in the Big Ten for the first time since the 1988 season.

Scoring summary

| Quarter | Time | Drive | | | Team | Scoring information | Score | |
| Quarter | Time | Plays | Yards | TOP | Team | Scoring information | OSU | NEB |
|---|---|---|---|---|---|---|---|---|
| 1 | 7:16 | 13 | 56 | 7:455 | Ohio State | Drew Basil 41-yard field goal | 3 | 0 |
| 1 | 5:15 | 13 | 56 | 7:44 | Nebraska | Brett Maher 50-yard field goal | 3 | 3 |
| 1 | 1:51 | 7 | 80 | 3:24 | Ohio State | Jake Stoneburner 32-yard pass from Braxton Miller (Drew Basil kick) | 10 | 3 |
| 2 | 12:46 | 1 | 58 | 0:10 | Ohio State | Carlos Hyde 63-yard run (Drew Basil kick) | 17 | 3 |
| 2 | 2:44 | 8 | 40 | 3:43 | Nebraska | Brett Maher 34-yard field goal | 17 | 6 |
| 2 | 0:00 | 2 | 29 | 0:15 | Ohio State | Drew Basil 35-yard field goal | 20 | 6 |
| 3 | 10:53 | 7 | 47 | 3:02 | Ohio State | Carlos Hyde 1-yard run (Drew Basil kick) | 27 | 6 |
| 3 | 7:23 | 2 | 24 | 0:31 | Nebraska | Taylor Martinez 18-yard run (Brett Maher kick) | 27 | 13 |
| 3 | 1:44 | 7 | 80 | 2:37 | Nebraska | Quincy Enuwa 36-yard pass from Taylor Martinez (Brett Maher kick) | 27 | 20 |
| 4 | 7:35 | 7 | 72 | 2:51 | Nebraska | Rex Burkhead 30-yard pass from Taylor Martinez (Brett Maher kick) | 27 | 27 |
| 4 | 5:10 | 7 | 72 | 2:51 | Nebraska | Rex Burkhead 17-yard run (Brett Maher kick) | 27 | 34 |
| "TOP" = time of possession. For other American football terms, see Glossary of American football. | | | | | | | 27 | 34 |

=== Illinois ===
Ohio State at #16 Illinois

| Team | 1 | 2 | 3 | 4 | Total |
|---|---|---|---|---|---|
| • Ohio State | 3 | 0 | 7 | 7 | 17 |
| #16 Illinois | 0 | 0 | 0 | 7 | 7 |

- Date: October 15
- Location: Memorial Stadium
  Champaign, IL
- Game start: 3:30 p.m. EDT
- Elapsed time: 2:53
- Game attendance: 55,229
- Game weather: Clear, 63 °F (17 °C), Wind W 21 mph (34 km/h)
- Referee: Todd Geerlings
- TV announcers (ABC/ESPN): Bob Wischusen (Play-by-play), Bob Davie (Color) & Heather Cox (Sideline)

Ohio State came into the season match up with the undefeated Illinois Fighting Illini coming off two consecutive losses for the first time since the 2004 season. As with the last game against Nebraska, Ohio State opened the game with a primarily running attack on their first drive, with the return of star running back Dan Herron from suspension. Ohio State began the game with a Drew Basil 43-yard field goal, giving them a 3–0 lead. Throughout the rest of the first half, both teams would exchange field position and punts with no more scoring or offensive production coming from either team. Going into halftime, Ohio State still held a 3–0 lead, with Illinois receiving the ball first in the second half. An interception by Ohio State early on in the third quarter, set up Ohio State inside the Illinois red-zone, and the eventual Herron touchdown. After no more scoring throughout the third quarter, Ohio State went into the fourth quarter with only a 10–0 lead. An early touchdown pass from Braxton Miller to Jake Stoneburner gave Ohio State their largest lead at 17–0. Following the touchdown, a very long, 16 play drive by Illinois, which resulted in a touchdown, ended the Ohio State shutout thus far, and put Illinois back in the game. A few defensive stops, coupled with the offense running down the clock, clinched the victory for the Buckeyes. With the victory, Ohio State moved to 4–3 on the season and 1–2 in the Big Ten, their first Big Ten victory of the season.

Scoring summary

| Quarter | Time | Drive | | | Team | Scoring information | Score | |
| Quarter | Time | Plays | Yards | TOP | Team | Scoring information | OSU | ILL |
|---|---|---|---|---|---|---|---|---|
| 1 | 9:04 | 10 | 45 | 5:56 | Ohio State | Drew Basil 43-yard field goal | 3 | 0 |
| 3 | 14:06 | 1 | 12 | 0:07 | Ohio State | Dan Herron 12-yard run (Drew Basil kick) | 10 | 0 |
| 4 | 13:06 | 3 | 22 | 1:14 | Ohio State | Jake Stoneburner 17-yard pass from Braxton Miller (Drew Basil kick) | 17 | 0 |
| 4 | 6:22 | 16 | 80 | 6:44 | Illinois | Evan Wilson 3-yard pass from Nathan Scheelhaase (Derek Dimke kick) | 17 | 7 |
| "TOP" = time of possession. For other American football terms, see Glossary of American football. | | | | | | | 17 | 7 |

=== Wisconsin ===
#12 Wisconsin at Ohio State

| Team | 1 | 2 | 3 | 4 | Total |
|---|---|---|---|---|---|
| #12 Wisconsin | 7 | 0 | 7 | 15 | 29 |
| • Ohio State | 0 | 3 | 14 | 16 | 33 |

- Date: October 29
- Location: Ohio Stadium
  Columbus, OH
- Game start: 8:00 p.m. EDT
- Elapsed time: 3:17
- Game attendance: 105,511
- Game weather: Clear, 43 °F (6 °C), Wind S 1 mph (1.6 km/h)
- Referee: Dave Witvoet
- TV announcers (ESPN): Brad Nessler (Play-by-play), Todd Blackledge (Color) & Holly Rowe (Sideline)

Ohio State entered their 2011 homecoming game following a bye week, with their opponent being the Wisconsin Badgers, who were the only team to defeat the Buckeyes in the 2010 season. The game opened with neither team scoring on their opening possession. Wisconsin's high-powered run-and-pass attack struck first midway through the first quarter with a touchdown reception from Montee Ball giving Wisconsin an early 7–0 lead. Led on many parts by the mistakes of the Badgers, the Buckeyes were able to penetrate Wisconsin's side of the field, especially late in the second quarter, where a Drew Basil field goal cut the Wisconsin lead to 7–3 going into halftime. With the opening of the third quarter, Braxton Miller and the Ohio State offense were able to drive down the field, capped off with a 1-yard touchdown run from Miller, which gave the Buckeyes their first lead of the night at 10–7. After a Wisconsin blocked punt on their next possession, Ohio State was able to drive the ball into the end zone again with a Jordan Hall two-yard run and gave Ohio State a 17–7 lead. Wisconsin quickly responded with the next drive and the ensuing touchdown from Ball, his second on the day, cut the game back down to a 17–14 affair. Ohio State held the lead going into the fourth quarter and quickly was able to increase their lead with another Basil field goal. As the quarter quickly ticked away, Miller was able to break away on a quarterback run and go in for the touchdown. With the failed two-point conversion, Ohio State firmly held a 26–14 lead with a little under five minutes remaining in the game. Wisconsin quickly drove down the field to score a touchdown in only 0:58 cutting the Ohio State lead to 26–21. With Ohio State unproductive on their ensuing possession, Wisconsin received the ball back and again drove down the field quickly to score, in only 1:18, with their two-point conversion good. Ohio State trailed 29–26, and with a short field to work with, Miller and the offense took the field. With a little under forty seconds remaining in the game, Miller completed a 40-yard touchdown pass Devin Smith, and sealed the victory for Ohio State. With the win, the Buckeyes put themselves into position to earn a trip to the inaugural Big Ten championship game and moved to 2–2 in the Big Ten, after starting 0–2.

Scoring summary

| Quarter | Time | Drive | | | Team | Scoring information | Score | |
| Quarter | Time | Plays | Yards | TOP | Team | Scoring information | WIS | OSU |
|---|---|---|---|---|---|---|---|---|
| 1 | 6:58 | 8 | 69 | 3:10 | Wisconsin | Montee Ball 22-yard pass from Russell Wilson (Philip Welch kick) | 7 | 0 |
| 2 | 2:55 | 10 | 31 | 5:46 | Ohio State | Drew Basil 39-yard field goal | 7 | 3 |
| 3 | 12:00 | 7 | 75 | 3:00 | Ohio State | Braxton Miller 1-yard run (Drew Basil kick) | 7 | 10 |
| 3 | 9:26 | 3 | 1 | 1:10 | Ohio State | Jordan Hall 2-yard run (Drew Basil kick) | 7 | 17 |
| 3 | 4:23 | 6 | 27 | 3:21 | Wisconsin | Montee Ball 1-yard run (Philip Welch kick) | 14 | 17 |
| 4 | 10:39 | 8 | 28 | 3:54 | Ohio State | Drew Basil 22-yard field goal | 14 | 20 |
| 4 | 4:39 | 6 | 63 | 3:25 | Ohio State | Braxton Miller 44-yard run (pass failed) | 14 | 26 |
| 4 | 3:48 | 4 | 66 | 0:44 | Wisconsin | Jared Abbrederis 17-yard pass from Russell Wilson (Philip Welch kick) | 21 | 26 |
| 4 | 1:18 | 4 | 68 | 1:18 | Wisconsin | Jared Abbrederis 17-yard pass from Russell Wilson (Philip Welch kick) | 29 | 26 |
| 4 | 0:20 | 4 | 52 | 0:50 | Ohio State | Devin Smith 40-yard pass from Braxton Miller (Drew Basil kick) | 29 | 33 |
| "TOP" = time of possession. For other American football terms, see Glossary of American football. | | | | | | | 29 | 33 |

=== Indiana ===
Indiana at Ohio State

| Team | 1 | 2 | 3 | 4 | Total |
|---|---|---|---|---|---|
| Indiana | 10 | 3 | 7 | 0 | 20 |
| • Ohio State | 7 | 6 | 14 | 7 | 34 |

- Date: November 5
- Location: Ohio Stadium
  Columbus, OH
- Game start: 12:00 p.m. EDT
- Elapsed time: 3:03
- Game attendance: 105,195
- Game weather: Clear, 48 °F (9 °C), Wind ESE 8 mph (13 km/h)
- Referee: Dennis Lipski
- TV announcers (BTN): Tom Hart (Play-by-play), Derek Rackley (Color) & Lisa Byington (Sideline)

After the Buckeyes victory of Wisconsin, Ohio State remained at home to face an intra-divisional team in the Indiana Hoosiers. Ohio State began the game slowly, allowing an Indiana field goal, quickly followed by a five-yard touchdown run within the first ten minutes of the game, giving the Hoosiers a 10–0 lead. On the next possession, Braxton Miller quickly cut down the Indiana lead with an 81-yard touchdown run, one of the longest by runs by a quarterback in Ohio State history. Heading into the second quarter Indiana still held a 10–7, however two Drew Basil field goals allowed the Buckeyes to take their first lead of the day at 13–10. With 4:30 remaining in the first half, Indiana was able to capitalize and kick a 25-yard field goal, tying the game at 13–13 going into halftime. Dan Herron made his presence known again in the game quickly to start the third quarter with a 15-yard touchdown run, giving Ohio State the lead back at 20–13. However, the back-and-forth match continued at Indiana drove down the field to score a touchdown in response on a Robertson to Hughes reception. Another Miller touchdown run would give Ohio State the 27–20 lead going into the fourth quarter, as well as the momentum. Led by the defense, Ohio State was able to rally in the fourth quarter and allowed Ohio State the get the sealing touchdown with a little over two minutes remaining in the game, which gave the Buckeyes the 34–20 lead and improved their record to 6–3 on the season.

Scoring summary

| Quarter | Time | Drive | | | Team | Scoring information | Score | |
| Quarter | Time | Plays | Yards | TOP | Team | Scoring information | IND | OSU |
|---|---|---|---|---|---|---|---|---|
| 1 | 10:47 | 11 | 42 | 4:13 | Indiana | Mitch Ewald 35-yard field goal | 3 | 0 |
| 1 | 7:17 | 6 | 41 | 2:13 | Indiana | Stephen Houston 5-yard run (Mitch Ewald kick) | 10 | 0 |
| 1 | 5:58 | 2 | 79 | 1:14 | Ohio State | Braxton Miller 81-yard run (Drew Basil kick) | 10 | 7 |
| 2 | 14:07 | 10 | 40 | 4:46 | Ohio State | Drew Basil 36-yard field goal | 10 | 10 |
| 2 | 8:43 | 5 | 52 | 2:47 | Ohio State | Drew Basil 45-yard field goal | 10 | 13 |
| 2 | 4:30 | 11 | 72 | 4:13 | Indiana | Mitch Ewald 25-yard field goal | 13 | 13 |
| 3 | 10:05 | 4 | 48 | 1:46 | Ohio State | Dan Herron 15-yard run (Drew Basil kick) | 13 | 20 |
| 3 | 6:56 | 7 | 64 | 3:02 | Indiana | Kofi Hughes 34-yard pass from Tre Roberson (Mitch Ewald kick) | 20 | 20 |
| 3 | 0:09 | 13 | 80 | 6:47 | Ohio State | Braxton Miller 20-yard run (Drew Basil kick) | 20 | 27 |
| 4 | 2:41 | 4 | 58 | 1:26 | Ohio State | Carlos Hyde 2-yard run (Drew Basil kick) | 20 | 34 |
| "TOP" = time of possession. For other American football terms, see Glossary of American football. | | | | | | | 20 | 34 |

=== Purdue ===
Ohio State Buckeyes (6–3) at Purdue Boilermakers (4–5)

| Quarter | 1 | 2 | 3 | 4 | OT | Total |
|---|---|---|---|---|---|---|
| Ohio State | 0 | 7 | 7 | 6 | 3 | 23 |
| Purdue | 10 | 7 | 0 | 3 | 6 | 26 |

at Ross–Ade Stadium • West Lafayette, Indiana

- Date: November 12
- Game time: 12:00 p.m. EDT
- Game weather: Mostly sunny • 56 °F (13 °C) • Wind SW 11 miles per hour (18 km/h; 9.6 kn)
- Game attendance: 43,334
- Referee: Todd Geerlings
- TV announcers (Big Ten Network): Tom Hart, Derek Rackley & Lisa Byington
- Box Score

Game information

Ohio State

- Braxton Miller
  8/18, 132 Yds, 2 TD
- Dan Herron
  18 Rush, 62 Yds
- Jordan Hall
  3 Rec, 58 Yds, 2 TD

Purdue

- Caleb TerBush
  15/24, 140 Yds
- Ralph Bolden
  18 Rush, 80 Yds, TD
- Antavian Edison
  5 Rec, 47 Yds

In their first visit to West Lafayette since their 2009 loss, the Buckeyes looked for their fourth straight win and first at Ross–Ade Stadium since 2007. The game started for the Buckeyes like the previous week's match up versus Indiana. A 19-yard field goal from Wiggs and four-yard touchdown run gave Purdue a 10–0 lead which they held through the entirety of the first quarter. A 38-yard touchdown reception from Miller to Hall gave the Buckeyes some offensive spark as they cut the score down to 10–7. However, another Purdue touchdown would give Purdue a commanding 17–7 lead with 3:19 left in the second quarter, a lead which they would take into halftime. With the Ohio State defense making crucial stops in the second half, Ohio State was able to get the ball back and score on their first possession in the second half with a 6-yard Braxton Miller touchdown run, giving Purdue now only a 17–14 lead. While both teams struggled with their offense, it would be Purdue who added to their lead with a 44-yard field goal, and extending their lead to 20–14. Ohio State was not able to get close to a score for most of the fourth quarter, however a long drive at the end of the quarter saw a Miller pass to Hall for a touchdown, tying the game at 20–20. However, with a Drew Basil blocked extra point, the game remained tied and headed into overtime. The Ohio State offense continued to struggle on their overtime possession only able to come up with a field goal, which gave them their first lead of the game at 23–20. The Buckeyes defense, taking the field next was unable to stop the Purdue running attack and eventually allowed a touchdown from the one-yard line to end the game and give the Boilermakers the 26–23 win. With the loss, Ohio State dropped to 6–4, losing at least four games in a season for the first time since 2004, and making the road to the Big Ten Championship Game much harder if not impossible with a 3–3 Big Ten record.

Scoring summary

| Quarter | Time | Drive | | | Team | Scoring information | Score | |
| Quarter | Time | Plays | Yards | TOP | Team | Scoring information | OSU | PUR |
|---|---|---|---|---|---|---|---|---|
| 1 | 10:30 | 10 | 57 | 3:13 | Purdue | 19-yard field goal by Carson Wiggs | 0 | 3 |
| 1 | 4:09 | 11 | 60 | 4:03 | Purdue | Akeem Shavers 4-yard touchdown run, Carson Wiggs kick good | 0 | 10 |
| 2 | 11:42 | 8 | 68 | 3:05 | Ohio State | Jordan Hall 38-yard touchdown reception from Braxton Miller, Drew Basil kick good | 7 | 10 |
| 2 | 3:19 | 13 | 88 | 5:23 | Purdue | Ralph Bolden 7-yard touchdown run, Carson Wiggs kick good | 7 | 17 |
| 3 | 9:42 | 8 | 58 | 3:52 | Ohio State | Braxton Miller 6-yard touchdown run, Drew Basil kick good | 14 | 17 |
| 4 | 13:06 | 5 | 18 | 1:39 | Purdue | 44-yard field goal by Carson Wiggs | 14 | 20 |
| 4 | 0:55 | 10 | 66 | 5:20 | Ohio State | Jordan Hall 13-yard touchdown reception from Braxton Miller, Drew Basil kick no good (blocked) | 20 | 20 |
| OT | | 4 | 9 | | Ohio State | 33-yard field goal by Drew Basil | 23 | 20 |
| OT | | 7 | 25 | | Purdue | Robert Marve 1-yard touchdown run | 23 | 26 |
| "TOP" = time of possession. For other American football terms, see Glossary of American football. | | | | | | | 23 | 26 |

=== Penn State ===
#21 Penn State at Ohio State

| Team | 1 | 2 | 3 | 4 | Total |
|---|---|---|---|---|---|
| • #21 Penn State | 10 | 10 | 0 | 0 | 20 |
| Ohio State | 0 | 14 | 0 | 0 | 14 |

- Date: November 19
- Location: Ohio Stadium
  Columbus, OH
- Game start: 3:30 p.m. EST
- Elapsed time: 2:52
- Game attendance: 105,493
- Game weather: Overcast, 53 °F (12 °C), Wind SW 12 mph (19 km/h)
- Referee: Dan Capron
- TV announcers (ABC/ESPN): Brad Nessler (Play-by-play), Todd Blackledge (Color) & Holly Rowe (Sideline)

Ohio State entered their 2011 senior day with a 6–4 record, facing a Penn State Nittany Lions team with aspirations of the Big Ten Championship Game. In the same fashion of the previous two games, Ohio State fell behind quickly in the game facing a 10–0 deficit following an early Stephfon Green touchdown run and a 43-yard field goal from Anthony Fera. Heading into the second quarter, Ohio State put together their first extended drive of the game, ending in a Braxton Miller 24-yard touchdown run cutting the Penn State lead to a 10–7 affair. Penn State returned the favor with a quick drive ending with another Green touchdown run, giving the Nittany Lions the 17–7 advantage midway through the second quarter. Later in the quarter, Ohio State was able to put together their second scoring drive of the game which consisted of only five plays and ended in a Jake Stoneburner touchdown reception. Penn State, however, was able to use the rest of the second quarter clock on a drive which put them into field goal position, Fera's 46-yard field goal was good, and allowed them to go into halftime with a 20–14, the eventual final score of the game. The second half was marred for Ohio State with the defense able to stop the Nittany Lions on the one-yard line four times for a goal line stand, but also of two costly fumbles which would end an hope of a comeback drive. The last two quarters of the game saw no scoring and allowed Penn State to exit Ohio Stadium with the 20–14 win, their first win at Ohio State since 2008, bringing Ohio State's overall record to 6–5 on the season, and 3–4 in conference play.

Scoring summary

| Quarter | Time | Drive | | | Team | Scoring information | Score | |
| Quarter | Time | Plays | Yards | TOP | Team | Scoring information | PSU | OSU |
|---|---|---|---|---|---|---|---|---|
| 1 | 12:27 | 5 | 80 | 2:33 | Penn State | Stephfon Green 39-yard run (Anthony Fera kick) | 7 | 0 |
| 1 | 1:59 | 15 | 54 | 5:29 | Penn State | Anthony Fera 43-yard field goal | 10 | 0 |
| 2 | 12:32 | 10 | 77 | 4:22 | Ohio State | Braxton Miller 24-yard run (Drew Basil kick) | 10 | 7 |
| 2 | 10:05 | 5 | 81 | 2:20 | Penn State | Stephfon Green 4-yard run (Anthony Fera kick) | 17 | 7 |
| 2 | 5:22 | 5 | 37 | 2:51 | Ohio State | Jake Stoneburner 7-yard pass from Braxton Miller (Drew Basil kick) | 17 | 14 |
| 2 | 0:00 | 9 | 49 | 5:18 | Penn State | Anthony Fera 46-yard field goal | 20 | 14 |
| "TOP" = time of possession. For other American football terms, see Glossary of American football. | | | | | | | 20 | 14 |

=== Michigan ===
Ohio State at #15 Michigan

| Team | 1 | 2 | 3 | 4 | Total |
|---|---|---|---|---|---|
| Ohio State | 7 | 17 | 0 | 10 | 34 |
| • #15 Michigan | 16 | 7 | 7 | 10 | 40 |

- Date: November 26
- Location: Michigan Stadium
  Ann Arbor, MI
- Game start: 12:00 p.m. EST
- Elapsed time: 3:35
- Game attendance: 114,132
- Game weather: Partly Cloudy, 53 °F (12 °C), Wind S 10 mph (16 km/h)
- Referee: Bill LeMonnier
- TV announcers (ABC): Dave Pasch (Play-by-play), Chris Spielman (Color) & Quint Kessenich (Sideline)

Ohio State finished its conference slate with a loss to the Wolverines under first year head coach and Ohio native Brady Hoke. The loss saw the Buckeyes' 7-year winning streak against their arch-rivals come to an end.

Scoring summary

| Quarter | Time | Drive | | | Team | Scoring information | Score | |
| Quarter | Time | Plays | Yards | TOP | Team | Scoring information | OSU | MICH |
|---|---|---|---|---|---|---|---|---|
| 1 | 12:43 | 6 | 80 | 2:17 | Ohio State | Corey Brown 54-yard pass from Braxton Miller (Drew Basil kick) | 7 | 0 |
| 1 | 9:15 | 2 | 47 | 0:35 | Michigan | Denard Robinson 41-yard run (Brendan Gibbons kick) | 7 | 7 |
| 1 | 7:41 | | | | Michigan | Safety, holding penalty on Mike Adams in end zone | 7 | 9 |
| 1 | 3:02 | 8 | 52 | 4:34 | Michigan | Junior Hemingway 26-yard pass from Denard Robinson (Brendan Gibbons kick) | 7 | 16 |
| 2 | 10:37 | 10 | 42 | 4:15 | Ohio State | Drew Basil 45-yard field goal | 10 | 16 |
| 2 | 7:51 | 3 | 31 | 1:15 | Ohio State | Braxton Miller 19-yard run (Drew Basil kick) | 17 | 16 |
| 2 | 3:16 | 9 | 80 | 4:35 | Michigan | Denard Robinson 6-yard run (Brendan Gibbons kick) | 17 | 23 |
| 2 | 1:21 | 6 | 66 | 1:55 | Ohio State | DeVier Posey 43-yard pass from Braxton Miller (Drew Basil kick) | 24 | 23 |
| 3 | 9:05 | 11 | 80 | 5:55 | Michigan | Martavious Odoms 20-yard pass from Denard Robinson (Brendan Gibbons kick) | 24 | 30 |
| 4 | 12:50 | 6 | 28 | 3:20 | Ohio State | Drew Basil 21-yard field goal | 27 | 30 |
| 3 | 8:32 | 8 | 75 | 4:18 | Michigan | Kevin Koger 4-yard pass from Denard Robinson (Brendan Gibbons kick) | 27 | 37 |
| 4 | 7:09 | 5 | 80 | 1:23 | Ohio State | Dan Herron 4-yard run (Drew Basil kick) | 34 | 37 |
| 4 | 1:59 | 11 | 54 | 5:10 | Michigan | Brendan Gibbons 43-yard field goal | 34 | 40 |
| "TOP" = time of possession. For other American football terms, see Glossary of American football. | | | | | | | 34 | 40 |

=== 2012 Gator Bowl ===
2012 Taxslayer.com Gator Bowl

| Team | 1 | 2 | 3 | 4 | Total |
|---|---|---|---|---|---|
| Ohio State | 0 | 10 | 0 | 7 | 17 |
| • Florida | 7 | 7 | 7 | 3 | 24 |

- Date: January 2
- Location: EverBank Field
  Jacksonville, FL
- Game start: 1:00 p.m. EST
- Elapsed time: 3:09
- Game attendance: 61,312
- Game weather: Sunny, 59 °F (15 °C), Wind NW 16 mph (26 km/h)
- Referee: Cooper Castleberry
- TV announcers (ESPN2): Mike Patrick (Play-by-play), Ed Cunningham (Color) & Jeannine Edwards (Sideline)

The game featured Urban Meyer's former school (Florida) versus the school (Ohio State) he was about to take over as head coach.

Scoring summary

| Quarter | Time | Drive | | | Team | Scoring information | Score | |
| Quarter | Time | Plays | Yards | TOP | Team | Scoring information | OSU | FLA |
|---|---|---|---|---|---|---|---|---|
| 1 | 0:56 | 14 | 80 | 7:12 | Florida | Deonte Thompson 17-yard pass from John Brantley (Caleb Sturgis kick) | 0 | 7 |
| 2 | 11:25 | 8 | 72 | 3:37 | Ohio State | DeVier Posey 5-yard pass from Braxton Miller (Drew Basil kick) | 7 | 7 |
| 2 | 11:13 | | | | Florida | Andre Debose 99-yard kickoff return (Caleb Sturgis kick) | 7 | 14 |
| 2 | 0:15 | 9 | 20 | 4:42 | Ohio State | Drew Basil 47-yard field goal | 10 | 14 |
| 3 | 11:14 | | | | Florida | Graham Stewart 14-yard blocked punt return (Caleb Sturgis kick) | 10 | 21 |
| 4 | 14:09 | 8 | 53 | 4:01 | Florida | Caleb Sturgis 17-yard field goal | 10 | 24 |
| 4 | 0:57 | 7 | 88 | 2:08 | Ohio State | Jordan Hall 11-yard pass from Braxton Miller (Drew Basil kick) | 17 | 24 |
| "TOP" = time of possession. For other American football terms, see Glossary of American football. | | | | | | | 17 | 24 |

== Personnel ==
=== Roster ===
2011 Ohio State Buckeyes football team roster
Players
Coaches
Offense

| Pos. | # | Name | Class |
|---|---|---|---|
| OL | 75 | Mike Adams | Sr |
| QB | 14 | Joe Bauserman | Sr |
| RB | 4 | Jamaal Berry | So |
| OL | 64 | Ivon Blackman | So |
| OL | 51 | Brian Bobek | Fr |
| FB | 44 | Zach Boren | Jr |
| C | 50 | Mike Brewster | Sr |
| WR | 10 | Corey Brown | So |
| OL | 55 | Tommy Brown | Fr |
| OL | 72 | Chris Carter | Fr |
| RB | 35 | Bo DeLande | Sr |
| RB | 37 | Spencer DeLande | So |
| FB | 33 | David Durham | Fr |
| WR | 80 | Chris Fields | So |
| TE | 88 | Reid Fragel | Jr |
| RB | 37 | James Georgiades | Jr |
| QB | 19 | Taylor Graham | Fr |
| QB | 13 | Kenny Guiton | So |
| RB | 7 | Jordan Hall | Jr |
| OL | 79 | Marcus Hall | So |
| RB | 1 | Dan Herron | Sr |
| TE | 88 | Jeff Heuerman | Fr |
| RB | 49 | Adam Homan | Jr |
| OL | 65 | Nick Humphries | Fr |
| RB | 34 | Carlos Hyde | So |
| OL | 69 | Eric Kramer | Fr |
| OL | 71 | Corey Linsley | So |
| OL | 74 | Jack Mewhort | So |
| QB | 5 | Braxton Miller | Fr |
| OL | 78 | Andrew Norwell | So |
| WR | 8 | DeVier Posey | Sr |
| WR | 9 | Verlon Reed | Fr |
| WR | 89 | Jared Riley | So |
| WR | 87 | Chris Roark | Sr |
| WR | 84 | Ryan Ross | Fr |
| TE | 82 | Kyle Schuck | Fr |
| WR | 83 | Donald Senegal | Jr |
| OL | 76 | J.B. Shugarts | Sr |
| QB | 17 | Justin Siems | So |
| WR | 15 | Devin Smith | Fr |
| RB | 2 | Rod Smith | Fr |
| TE | 48 | Spencer Smith | Sr |
| WR | 16 | Evan Spencer | Fr |
| OL | 66 | Ben St. John | Fr |
| TE | 11 | Jake Stoneburner | Jr |
| OL | 70 | Tim Trummer | Fr |
| OL | 73 | Antonio Underwood | Fr |
| TE | 81 | Nick Vannett | Fr |
| WR | 18 | T.Y. Williams | Fr |
| RB | 32 | Darryl Wood | So |

Defense

| Pos. | # | Name | Class |
|---|---|---|---|
| DB | 8 | Dionte Allen | Sr |
| LB | 48 | Dan Bain | Sr |
| DL | 90 | Darryl Baldwin | Fr |
| DB | 4 | C.J. Barnett | So |
| DL | 93 | Adam Bellamy | So |
| DL | 63 | Michael Bennett | Fr |
| DL | 68 | Evan Blankenship | Sr |
| DL | 56 | Dalton Britt | Jr |
| DB | 3 | Corey Brown | So |
| DB | 2 | Christian Bryant | So |
| DB | 17 | Jeremy Cash | Fr |
| DB | 5 | Dominic Clarke | So |
| LB | 36 | Connor Crowell | Fr |
| DB | 16 | Zach Domicone | Jr |
| DB | 34 | Nate Ebner | Sr |
| DB | 30 | Donnie Evege | Sr |
| DL | 57 | Chase Farris | Fr |
| DE | 91 | Melvin Fellows | So |
| DB | 24 | Adam Frazier | So |
| DB | 18 | DerJuan Gambrell | Fr |
| DL | 53 | Garrett Goebel | Jr |
| LB | 14 | Curtis Grant | Fr |
| DB | 12 | Doran Grant | Fr |
| DL | 94 | Cavin Green | So |
| DB | 9 | Adam Griffin | Fr |
| DB | 23 | Chad Hagen | Fr |
| DT | 51 | Joel Hale | Fr |
| DL | 52 | Johnathan Hankins | So |
| LB | 35 | James Hastings | So |
| DL | 86 | Kenny Hayes | Fr |
| DB | 7 | Travis Howard | Jr |
| LB | 41 | Tony Jackson | Sr |
| DB | 19 | Orhian Johnson | Jr |
| LB | 32 | Storm Klein | Jr |
| DL | 95 | Don Matheney | Sr |
| DB | 37 | Chris Maxwell | Sr |
| DL | 92 | William McCary | Jr |
| LB | 38 | Scott McVey | Fr |
| DL | 88 | Steve Miller | Fr |
| LB | 26 | Tyler Moeller | Sr |
| DL | 50 | J.T. Moore | Fr |
| DB | 20 | Nate Oliver | Sr |
| DB | 25 | Vincent Petrella | Jr |
| DB | 29 | Taylor Rice | Jr |
| DB | 25 | Bradley Roby | Fr |
| LB | 6 | Etienne Sabino | Jr |
| DB | 33 | Nik Sarac | Fr |
| LB | 10 | Ryan Shazier | Fr |
| DL | 54 | John Simon | Jr |
| DL | 59 | Stewart Smith | Jr |
| LB | 42 | Andrew Sweat | Sr |
| DB | 28 | Ron Tanner | Fr |
| DE | 98 | Solomon Thomas | Sr |
| DB | 13 | Julian Vann | Fr |
| LB | 39 | Jordan Whiting | So |
| DL | 43 | Nathan Williams | Sr |
| DB | 21 | Jamie Wood | So |

Special teams

| Pos. | # | Name | Class |
|---|---|---|---|
| P/K | 24 | Drew Basil | So |
| P/K | 17 | Ben Buchanan | Jr |
| LS | 60 | Garrett Dornbrook | Sr |
| K | 20 | Russell Doup | Fr |
| P | 39 | Derek Erwin | Sr |
| LS | 54 | Bruce Haynes | Fr |
| LS | 56 | George Makridis | So |

Head coach

- Luke Fickell

Coordinators/assistant coaches

- Jim Bollman – Offensive coordinator/offensive line
- Jim Heacock – Defensive coordinator/defensive line
- Paul Haynes – Co-defensive coordinator/safeties
- Stan Drayton – Wide receivers
- Taver Johnson – Cornerbacks
- John Peterson – Tight ends/recruiting coordinator
- Nick Siciliano – Quarterbacks
- Dick Tressel – Running backs
- Mike Vrabel – Linebackers

Legend

- (C) Team captain
- (S) Suspended
- (I) Ineligible
- Injured
- Redshirt

Roster

=== Undrafted seniors who signed with an NFL team ===
Brandon Saine (running back) – Green Bay Packers

Dane Sanzenbacher (wide receiver) – Chicago Bears

Justin Boren (offensive lineman) – Baltimore Ravens

Bryant Browning (offensive lineman) – St. Louis Rams

Jake McQuaide (long snapper) – St. Louis Rams

Dexter Larimore (defensive tackle) – New Orleans Saints

Devon Torrence (cornerback) – Minnesota Vikings

=== NFL draft early entries ===
Terrelle Pryor – junior quarterback (NFL Supplemental Draft – third round to the Oakland Raiders)

=== Transfers out ===
Sam Longo – redshirt sophomore offensive lineman (University of Cincinnati)

Dorian Bell – redshirt sophomore linebacker (Duquesne University)

James Louis – redshirt freshman wide receiver (Florida International University)

James Jackson – redshirt sophomore wide receiver (Grand Valley State University)

=== Transfers in ===
None

=== Recruiting class ===
College recruiting
| Name | Hometown | School | Height | Weight | 40^{‡} | Commit date |
|---|---|---|---|---|---|---|
| Michael Bennett; DT | Centerville, OH | Centerville | 6 ft 3 in (1.91 m) | 275 lb (125 kg) | 5.0 | May 16, 2010 |
| Michael Bennett; DT | Recruit ratings: Scout: Rivals: (80) | | | | | |
| Brian Bobek; OL | Palatine, IL | Fremd | 6 ft 2 in (1.88 m) | 278 lb (126 kg) | – | Mar 16, 2010 |
| Brian Bobek; OL | Recruit ratings: Scout: Rivals: (79) | | | | | |
| Tommy Brown; OL | Akron, OH | Firestone Senior | 6 ft 5 in (1.96 m) | 310 lb (140 kg) | 5.1 | Apr 3, 2010 |
| Tommy Brown; OL | Recruit ratings: Scout: Rivals: (78) | | | | | |
| Chris Carter; OL | Cleveland, OH | John F. Kennedy | 6 ft 4 in (1.93 m) | 325 lb (147 kg) | – | Feb 25, 2011 |
| Chris Carter; OL | Recruit ratings: Scout: Rivals: (78) | | | | | |
| Jeremy Cash; DB | Plantation, FL | Plantation | 6 ft 2 in (1.88 m) | 185 lb (84 kg) | – | Apr 18, 2010 |
| Jeremy Cash; DB | Recruit ratings: Scout: Rivals: (80) | | | | | |
| Conner Crowell; LB | Waldorf, MD | North Point | 6 ft 1 in (1.85 m) | 215 lb (98 kg) | 4.5 | Nov 5, 2010 |
| Conner Crowell; LB | Recruit ratings: Scout: Rivals: (78) | | | | | |
| Chase Farris; DE | Elyria, OH | Elyria | 6 ft 6 in (1.98 m) | 265 lb (120 kg) | 4.9 | Mar 16, 2010 |
| Chase Farris; DE | Recruit ratings: Scout: Rivals: (79) | | | | | |
| DerJuan Gambrell; DB | Toledo, OH | Rogers | 6 ft 2 in (1.88 m) | 180 lb (82 kg) | 4.5 | Mar 16, 2010 |
| DerJuan Gambrell; DB | Recruit ratings: Scout: Rivals: (77) | | | | | |
| Curtis Grant; LB | Richmond, VA | Hermitage | 6 ft 3 in (1.91 m) | 222 lb (101 kg) | 4.5 | Feb 2, 2011 |
| Curtis Grant; LB | Recruit ratings: Scout: Rivals: (81) | | | | | |
| Doran Grant; DB | Akron, OH | St. Vincent-St. Mary | 5 ft 10 in (1.78 m) | 171 lb (78 kg) | 4.6 | Jan 5, 2011 |
| Doran Grant; DB | Recruit ratings: Scout: Rivals: (81) | | | | | |
| Joel Hale; DT | Greenwood, IN | Center Grove | 6 ft 4 in (1.93 m) | 290 lb (130 kg) | – | Jun 7, 2010 |
| Joel Hale; DT | Recruit ratings: Scout: Rivals: (79) | | | | | |
| Kenny Hayes; DE | Toledo, OH | Whitmer | 6 ft 5 in (1.96 m) | 240 lb (110 kg) | – | Aug 31, 2009 |
| Kenny Hayes; DE | Recruit ratings: Scout: Rivals: (79) | | | | | |
| Bryce Haynes; OL | Cumming, GA | Pinecrest Academy | 6 ft 4 in (1.93 m) | 185 lb (84 kg) | 4.8 | Jan 28, 2011 |
| Bryce Haynes; OL | Recruit ratings: Scout: Rivals: (73) | | | | | |
| Jeff Heuerman; TE | Naples, FL | Barron Collier | 6 ft 5 in (1.96 m) | 240 lb (110 kg) | 4.7 | Apr 26, 2010 |
| Jeff Heuerman; TE | Recruit ratings: Scout: Rivals: (80) | | | | | |
| Cardale Jones; QB | Cleveland, OH | Glenville Academic Campus | 6 ft 5 in (1.96 m) | 217 lb (98 kg) | 4.9 | Feb 2, 2011 |
| Cardale Jones; QB | Recruit ratings: Scout: Rivals: (78) | | | | | |
| Braxton Miller; QB | Huber Heights, OH | Wayne | 6 ft 2 in (1.88 m) | 185 lb (84 kg) | 4.5 | Jun 3, 2010 |
| Braxton Miller; QB | Recruit ratings: Scout: Rivals: (81) | | | | | |
| Steve Miller; DE | Canton, OH | McKinley | 6 ft 4 in (1.93 m) | 230 lb (100 kg) | 4.8 | Oct 29, 2009 |
| Steve Miller; DE | Recruit ratings: Scout: Rivals: (82) | | | | | |
| Ejuan Price; LB | Pittsburgh, PA | Woodland Hills | 6 ft 0 in (1.83 m) | 235 lb (107 kg) | – | Jan 17, 2011 |
| Ejuan Price; LB | Recruit ratings: Rivals: | | | | | |
| Ryan Shazier; LB | Plantation, FL | Plantation | 6 ft 3 in (1.91 m) | 205 lb (93 kg) | 4.6 | Dec 17, 2010 |
| Ryan Shazier; LB | Recruit ratings: Scout: Rivals: (81) | | | | | |
| Devin Smith; WR | Massillon, OH | Washington | 6 ft 1 in (1.85 m) | 175 lb (79 kg) | – | Jun 17, 2010 |
| Devin Smith; WR | Recruit ratings: Scout: Rivals: (78) | | | | | |
| Evan Spencer; WR | Vernon Hills, IL | Vernon Hills | 6 ft 1 in (1.85 m) | 185 lb (84 kg) | – | Jun 5, 2010 |
| Evan Spencer; WR | Recruit ratings: Scout: Rivals: (81) | | | | | |
| Ron Tanner; DB | Columbus, OH | Eastmoor | 6 ft 1 in (1.85 m) | 190 lb (86 kg) | 4.5 | Jul 2, 2010 |
| Ron Tanner; DB | Recruit ratings: Scout: Rivals: (78) | | | | | |
| Antonio Underwood; OL | Shaker Heights, OH | Shaker Heights | 6 ft 3 in (1.91 m) | 295 lb (134 kg) | – | Mar 15, 2010 |
| Antonio Underwood; OL | Recruit ratings: Scout: Rivals: (75) | | | | | |
| Nick Vannett; TE | Westerville, OH | Westerville Central | 6 ft 6 in (1.98 m) | 230 lb (100 kg) | – | Jun 30, 2010 |
| Nick Vannett; TE | Recruit ratings: Scout: Rivals: (80) | | | | | |
Overall recruit ranking: Scout: 5 Rivals: 11 ESPN: 7
Note: In many cases, Scout, Rivals, 247Sports, On3, and ESPN may conflict in their listings of height and weight.; In these cases, the average was taken. ESPN grades are on a 100-point scale.; Sources: "Ohio State Football Commitments". Rivals.; "2011 Ohio State Football Commits". Scout.; "ESPN". ESPN.; "Scout.com Team Recruiting Rankings". Scout.; "2011 Team Ranking". Rivals.com.

== 2012 NFL draft ==
The following Ohio State players were selected in the 2012 NFL draft:

| Rnd. | Pick | Team | Player | Pos. | College | Notes |
|---|---|---|---|---|---|---|
| 2 | 56 | Pittsburgh Steelers | Mike Adams | T | Ohio State | |
| 3 | 68 | Houston Texans | DeVier Posey | WR | Ohio State | |
| 6 | 191 | Cincinnati Bengals | Daniel Herron | RB | Ohio State | |
| 6 | 197 | New England Patriots | Nate Ebner | S | Ohio State | |
