= Joe Bauserman =

American football and baseball player (born 1985)

Profile
- Position: Quarterback

Personal information
- Born: October 4, 1985 (age 41); Leesburg, Virginia, U.S.
- Listed height: 6 ft 2 in (1.88 m)
- Listed weight: 230 lb (104 kg)

Career information
- High school: Lincoln High School (Tallahassee, Florida)
- College: Ohio State (2008–2011)
- NFL draft: 2012: undrafted

Joseph N. Bauserman (born October 4, 1985) is an American former football quarterback for the Ohio State Buckeyes.

== Early life ==
Bauserman played his junior through senior seasons at Lincoln High School, in Tallahassee, Florida. In his seasons at Strasburg High School in Strasburg, Virginia, he was all-state in football and baseball. As a senior at Lincoln, he was named captain of the football team, and went on to throw for 3,000 yards and 28 touchdowns as a junior and 2,000 yards and 27 touchdowns as a senior. He was named All-conference, and made a verbal commitment to Ohio State before choosing baseball.

== Baseball career ==
After high school, Bauserman decided to skip college and signed a professional contract with the Pittsburgh Pirates. There he played for the GCL Pirates, the Williamsport Crosscutters, and the Hickory Crawdads. In his three seasons, he compiled a 14–12 record with a 3.42 ERA as a starting pitcher.

== College career ==
In 2007, Bauserman joined the Ohio State football program as a walk-on and red-shirted. For the next three seasons, he served as the backup to Terrelle Pryor, seeing action in every season, and even throwing a touchdown pass in the 2010 game versus the Purdue Boilermakers.

In 2011, Bauserman was named the starter, and got his first career start against the Akron Zips; he attempted 16 passes and completed 12 of those passes for 163 yards and 3 passing touchdowns. Bauserman also ran six times for 32 yards including a 15-yard touchdown run. All three of his passing touchdowns went to the tight end Jake Stoneburner. After struggling against the Miami Hurricanes, he was benched and Braxton Miller became the starter for the rest of the season. Miller then fell victim to injury in the game against the Nebraska Cornhuskers and Bauserman came in with Ohio State leading 27–13 in the third quarter. Bauserman continued to struggle at the position going 1 for 10 with an interception and Ohio State fell to Nebraska, 34–27. Bauserman finished the season as the third-string quarterback with Kenny Guiton promoted to second string. He did not take another snap for the rest of the season.
