= Braxton Miller =

American football player (born 1992)

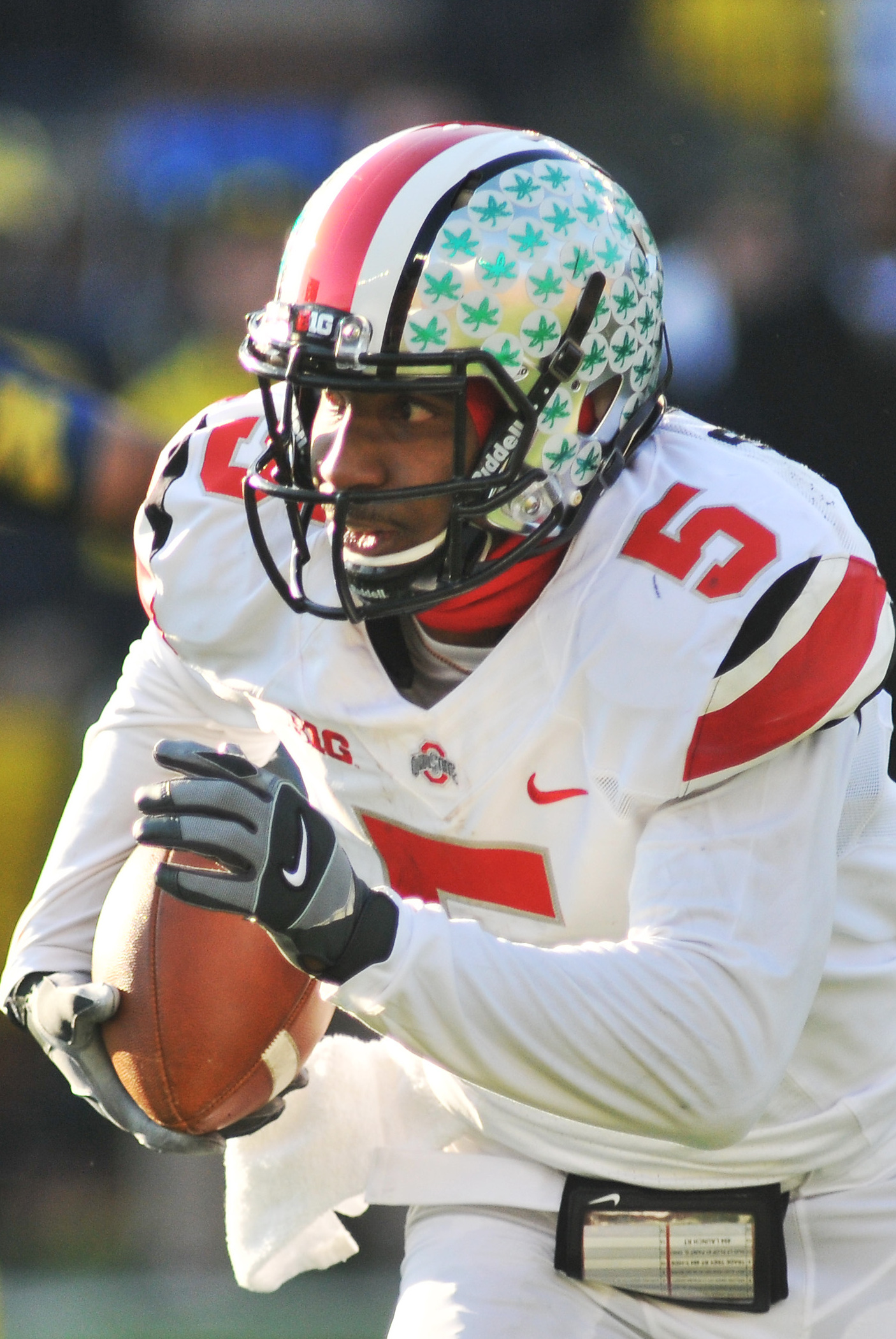
- Miller with the Ohio State Buckeyes in 2013

No. 13
- Positions: Wide receiver, Quarterback

Personal information
- Born: November 30, 1992 (age 33); Springfield, Ohio, U.S.
- Listed height: 6 ft 1 in (1.85 m)
- Listed weight: 205 lb (93 kg)

Career information
- High school: Wayne (Huber Heights, Ohio)
- College: Ohio State (2011–2015)
- NFL draft: 2016: 3rd round, 85th overall pick

Career history
- Houston Texans (2016–2017); Philadelphia Eagles (2018–2019)*; Cleveland Browns (2019)*; Carolina Panthers (2019)*
- * Offseason or practice squad member only

Awards and highlights
- CFP national champion (2015); Second-team All-American (2012); 2× Big Ten Most Valuable Player (2012, 2013); 2× Big Ten Offensive Player of the Year (2012, 2013); 2× Big Ten Quarterback of the Year (2012, 2013); Big Ten Freshman of the Year (2011); 2× First-team All-Big Ten (2012, 2013)

Career NFL statistics
- Receptions: 34
- Receiving yards: 261
- Receiving touchdowns: 2
- Stats at Pro Football Reference

Braxton Marcellus Miller (born November 30, 1992) is an American former professional football player who was a wide receiver in the National Football League (NFL). He played college football for the Ohio State Buckeyes and was their starting quarterback from 2011 to 2013, before moving to the wide receiver position in 2015 after sustaining a shoulder injury. He was selected by the Houston Texans in the third round of the 2016 NFL draft.

== Early life ==
Miller moved from Springfield, Ohio, to attend Wayne High School in Huber Heights, Ohio, before his freshman year. While there, he played high school football for the Warriors. He was named a Mr. Football Award Finalist, and also competed in the Under Armour All-America Game. He was also a letterman in basketball and track, where he went to district and regional meet in the 4 × 100 m relay, with a best of 43.68 seconds.

Miller committed to Ohio State on June 3, 2010, under then-head coach Jim Tressel. Miller also had scholarship offers from Alabama, Cincinnati, Florida, Georgia, Illinois, Kentucky, Michigan, North Carolina, Notre Dame, Tennessee, Southern California, West Virginia, and Wisconsin. It was rumored that Miller's friendship with another five-star recruit from Springfield, Ohio, Trey DePriest, would result in DePriest attending Ohio State as well. Instead, DePriest chose to attend Alabama.

College recruiting
Name	Hometown	School	Height	Weight	40^{‡}	Commit date
Braxton Miller; QB	Huber Heights, Ohio	Wayne High School	6 ft 2 in (1.88 m)	185 lb (84 kg)	4.46	Jun 3, 2010
Braxton Miller; QB	Recruit ratings: Scout: Rivals:					
Overall recruit ranking: Scout: 2 (QB) Rivals: 1 (QB), 1 (OH)
‡ Refers to 40-yard dash; Note: In many cases, Scout, Rivals, 247Sports, On3, and ESPN may conflict in their listings of height, weight and 40 time.; In these cases, the average was taken. ESPN grades are on a 100-point scale.; Sources: "2011 Team Ranking". Rivals.com.

== College career ==
=== 2011 season ===
Miller began the 2011 season as the backup to Joe Bauserman, but saw action in the season opening game against Akron, where he completed 8 of 12 passes for 130 yards and a touchdown in the 42–0 victory. Miller did not play in the second game of the season, a 27–22 victory over Toledo, due to a coaching decision, by interim head coach Luke Fickell. Miller played very little in the third game of the season, a 24–6 loss to the Miami Hurricanes. Miller was named the starting quarterback for the Buckeyes' fourth game against Colorado. His first career start turned out to be the best performance of his young career, as he tossed two touchdown passes, while going just 5 for 13 for 83 yards in the game. He was also able to run for 83 yards in the 37–17 victory. His second career start proved to not be so successful, as the Buckeyes lost 10–7 against Michigan State. For the game, Miller completed only 5 of 10 passes for 56 yards with an interception. He also was sacked several times resulting in −27 yards rushing. In his third career start against Nebraska, Miller completed 5 of 9 passes for 95 yards and a touchdown, before leaving the game with an ankle injury in the 3rd quarter. The Buckeyes had built a 27–6 lead with Miller playing, but they went on to lose the game 34–27, with Bauserman leading the offense for the rest of the game.

The following week, the Buckeyes defeated No. 16 Illinois, 17–7. Illinois was 6–0 coming into the contest, but could not stop the Buckeyes' ground game, as they ran for 211 yards, with Miller accounting for 34 of those yards. Miller only attempted four passes the entire game, completing only one, which was for a touchdown. After their bye week Ohio State faced off against No. 15 Wisconsin and won on a last minute 40-yard touchdown pass by Miller. He was 7 of 12 for the game with one touchdown and had 99 yards and two touchdowns on the ground in the 33–29 victory. In the next game, against Indiana, he had 14 carries for 105 rushing yards and two rushing touchdowns in the 34–20 victory. The Buckeyes ended the season on four-game losing streak. In that stretch, Miller had some productive games. On November 12, in a 26–23 loss to Purdue, he had 175 yards from scrimmage as he passed for two touchdowns and recorded a rushing touchdown as well. In the regular season finale, a 40–34 loss to Michigan, he had 235 passing yards, two passing touchdowns and one interception to go along with 16 carries for 100 rushing yards and a rushing touchdown. In the 2012 Gator Bowl against the Florida Gators, he had a poor game on the ground with 15 carries for 20 rushing yards but went 18-of-23 for 162 passing yards and two passing touchdowns in the 24–17 loss. After the season, Miller became the seventh Ohio State player to take home the conference's Freshman of the Year accolade. He also won the 2011 CFPA National Freshman Trophy. He finished the regular season ranked among the conference's top 10 in total offense with 11 passing and seven rushing touchdowns to go with 1,692 total yards.

=== 2012 season ===
Going into the 2012 season, Miller had a new head coach in Urban Meyer. He competed with Kenny Guiton for the starting quarterback position and won. He had a great campaign as a dual-threat quarterback. In the season opener against the Miami RedHawks, he had 207 passing yards, two passing touchdowns, and 17 carries for 161 rushing yards and a rushing touchdown in the 56–10 victory. The next week, a 31–16 victory over Central Florida, he had 27 carries for 141 rushing yards and three rushing touchdowns to go along with 155 passing yards, one passing touchdown, and one interception. In the following game, in a 35–28 victory over California, he had his best passing game of the season with 249 passing yards, four passing touchdowns, and one interception to go along with 75 rushing yards and a rushing touchdown. After a 29–15 victory over Alabama-Birmingham and a 17–16 victory over Michigan State, he had 186 rushing yards and a rushing touchdown in a 63–38 victory over Nebraska. In the next game, a 52–49 victory over Indiana, he had 360 total yards, passed for two touchdowns, and rushed for another.

Miller and the Buckeyes won their final five games to finish with an undefeated 12–0 record. Despite their undefeated record, Miller and the Buckeyes could not participate in the postseason due to a bowl ban. As a sophomore, Miller passed for 2,039 yards and 15 passing touchdowns with 1,271 rushing yards and 13 touchdowns. He finished in fifth place in the 2012 Heisman Trophy voting. He was named the Big Ten Conference Offensive Player of the Year in recognition of his successful season.

=== 2013 season ===
In the 2013 season, Miller continued to contribute for the Buckeyes. In the season opener against Buffalo, he had 178 passing yards, two passing touchdowns, and an interception to go along with 17 carries for 77 rushing yards in the 40–20 victory. In the following game, a 42–7 victory over San Diego State, he had to leave the game on the Buckeyes' first series due to a knee injury. He returned to action three weeks later against the Wisconsin Badgers and had 198 passing yards and four passing touchdowns to go along with 22 carries for 83 rushing yards in the 31–24 victory. After a 40–30 victory over Northwestern and a 34–24 victory over Iowa, he had 252 passing yards and three passing touchdowns to go along with 68 rushing yards and two rushing touchdowns in a 63–14 victory over Penn State.

In the final four games of the regular season, all victories, Miller combined for ten passing touchdowns and six rushing touchdowns. The Buckeyes finished with an undefeated record of 12–0. However, they lost their final two games; the Big Ten Championship to Michigan State by a score of 34–24 and the 2014 Orange Bowl to Clemson by a score of 40–35. With just over 11 minutes left in the 4th quarter of the Orange Bowl, he injured his throwing shoulder completing a go-ahead touchdown pass to Carlos Hyde. The injury eventually required surgery in the offseason and contributed to him switching from quarterback to wide receiver. As a junior, Miller had 2,094 passing yards, 24 passing touchdowns, 1,068 rushing yards, and 12 rushing touchdowns. He finished ninth in the 2013 Heisman Trophy voting and was once again named the Big Ten Offensive Player of the Year.

=== 2014 Season ===
After having surgery on his shoulder in February, Miller tore the labrum of the same shoulder in practice and took a medical redshirt for the 2014 season. His injury opened the door for J. T. Barrett and Cardale Jones to contribute at the quarterback position for the eventual National Champions.

=== 2015 Season ===
With the emergence of Barrett and Jones the previous season, the Buckeyes faced a three-way battle for quarterback going into the 2015 season. Part of the competition was quelled when Miller announced in July that he would switch positions to H-back. This decision was a result of his shoulder injury a year before Miller joined a receiving corps that included Michael Thomas, Jalin Marshall, and Curtis Samuel, as well as Ezekiel Elliot in the backfield. In the opening game of the 2015 season, he scored a rushing and receiving touchdown in Ohio State's 42–24 victory over Virginia Tech. He finished the season with 26 receptions for 341 yards, three receiving touchdowns, 260 rushing yards, and one rushing touchdown.

== Professional career ==
=== Pre-draft ===
At the NFL Scouting Combine, Miller was a top three performer in the 3-cone drill, the 20-yard shuttle, and the 60-yard shuttle. Miller was projected by many analysts and scouts to be a second or third round pick. He was ranked the ninth best wide receiver out of the 414 available by NFLDraftScout.com.

Pre-draft measurables
Height	Weight	Arm length	Hand span	40-yard dash	10-yard split	20-yard split	20-yard shuttle	Three-cone drill	Vertical jump	Broad jump	Bench press
6 ft 1 3/8 in (1.86 m)	201 lb (91 kg)	31 3/4 in (0.81 m)	9 1/8 in (0.23 m)	4.50 s	1.54 s	2.56 s	4.07 s	6.65 s	35 in (0.89 m)	10 ft 3 in (3.12 m)	17 reps
All values from NFL Combine

=== Houston Texans ===
The Houston Texans selected Miller in the third round (85th overall) of the 2016 NFL draft.

On May 26, 2016, the Texans signed Miller to a four-year, $3.11 million contract with a signing bonus of $709,103. He entered training camp competing with Jaelen Strong, Cecil Shorts, Keith Mumphery, Will Fuller, Wendall Williams, and Quenton Bundrage to be one of the Texans' starting star wide receivers. Miller was named the Texans's third wide receiver on their depth chart behind DeAndre Hopkins and fellow rookie Fuller.

Miller made his professional regular season debut as a starting receiver in the Texans' season opener and caught his first career reception on a six-yard pass from Brock Osweiler. It was his only catch of the game, as the Texans defeated the Chicago Bears 23–14. The following week, he had his first career carry for negative two yards against the Kansas City Chiefs. On November 21, Miller caught his first career touchdown on a 12-yard pass from Osweiler in a 20–27 loss to the Oakland Raiders. He finished the game with a season-high five receptions for 25 receiving yards and a touchdown. In Week 13, against the Green Bay Packers, he left midway through the game after he suffered a shoulder injury while attempting to catch a pass from Osweiler. On December 13, the Texans placed Miller on injured reserve. He finished his rookie season with 15 receptions for 99 receiving yards and a touchdown in ten games and six starts.

In the 2017 season, Miller appeared in 11 games and recorded 19 receptions for 162 receiving yards and a receiving touchdown. His most productive game statistically came against the Tennessee Titans in Week 13, where he had four receptions for 71 receiving yards in the 24–13 loss.

On September 1, 2018, Miller was waived by the Texans as a part of final roster cuts.

=== Philadelphia Eagles ===
On September 10, 2018, Miller was signed to the practice squad of the Philadelphia Eagles. He signed a reserve/future contract with the Eagles on January 14, 2019. On August 17, Miller was waived by the Eagles.

=== Cleveland Browns ===
On August 21, 2019, Miller was signed by the Cleveland Browns. He was released by the Browns during final roster cuts on August 31.

=== Carolina Panthers ===
On October 22, 2019, Miller was signed to the Carolina Panthers' practice squad. He was placed on the practice squad/injured list on October 28, and released with an injury settlement on November 2.

== Career statistics ==
Legend
**Bold**	Career high

=== NFL ===
Year	Team	Games		Receiving					
Year	Team	GP	GS	Tgt	Rec	Yds	Avg	Lng	TD
2016	HOU	10	6	28	15	99	6.6	12	**1**
2017	HOU	11	3	**29**	**19**	**162**	**8.5**	**57**	**1**
Total		21	9	57	34	261	7.7	57	2

=== College ===
Year	Team	Games			Passing								Rushing				Receiving			
Year	Team	GP	GS	Record	Cmp	Att	Pct	Yds	Avg	TD	Int	Rtg	Att	Yds	Avg	TD	Rec	Yds	Avg	TD
2011	Ohio State	12	10	4–6	85	157	54.1	1,159	7.4	13	4	138.4	159	715	4.5	7	0	0	0.0	0
2012	Ohio State	12	12	**12–0**	148	254	58.3	2,039	8.0	15	6	140.5	**227**	**1,271**	5.6	**13**	0	0	0.0	0
2013	Ohio State	12	12	10–2	**162**	**255**	63.5	**2,094**	**8.2**	**24**	**7**	**158.1**	171	1,068	**6.2**	12	0	0	0.0	0
2014	Ohio State	(redshirt) Redshirted due to injury																		
2015	Ohio State	13	13	0–0	1	1	**100.0**	3	3.0	0	0	125.2	42	260	6.1	1	**26**	**341**	**13.6**	**3**
Career		49	47	26–8	396	667	58.6	5,295	7.9	52	17	146.7	603	3,314	5.5	33	26	341	13.6	3
