= Kenny Guiton =

American football player and coach (born 1991)

Current position
- Title: Quarterbacks coach
- Team: Wisconsin
- Conference: Big Ten

Biographical details
- Born: June 27, 1991 (age 35); Houston, Texas, U.S.

Playing career
- 2009–2013: Ohio State
- 2014: Los Angeles KISS
- 2014: Buffalo Bills
- Position: Quarterback

Coaching career (HC unless noted)
- 2015–2016: Houston (GA)
- 2017–2018: Houston (WR)
- 2019: Louisiana Tech (OWR)
- 2020: Colorado State (WR)
- 2021–2023: Arkansas (WR)
- 2023: Arkansas (interim OC)
- 2024: Wisconsin (WR)
- 2025–present: Wisconsin (QB)

Kenny Guiton (born June 27, 1991) is an American college football coach and former professional quarterback. He is the quarterbacks coach for the University of Wisconsin–Madison, after coaching the wide receivers in 2024. He most recently was the interim offensive coordinator for the Arkansas Razorbacks. After being an undrafted free agent in the 2014 NFL draft, he was invited to mini-camp with the Buffalo Bills in 2014. He played college football at Ohio State University. He became a coach in 2015 and has also held positions at Houston, Texas, and Louisiana Tech.

== College career ==
=== 2012 season ===
Kenny Guiton would see his first meaningful playing time in the eighth game of the 2012 season. Trailing Purdue 14–20 late in the third quarter, Guiton was brought in to replace injured Braxton Miller. Down 14–22 with less than a minute remaining, Guiton lead the Buckeye offense on 61 yard drive, capped off with a touchdown pass to Chris Fields and a game tying two-point conversion pass to Jeff Heuerman. The Buckeyes would prevail 29–22 in overtime, preserving an unblemished 8–0 record in a season that Ohio State would finish 12–0.

=== 2013 season ===
In the second game of the season against San Diego State, Guiton was again called upon to replace an injured Braxton Miller. Guiton played the remainder of the game and would start the subsequent next two games, all Buckeye victories.

In his second start, Guiton set an Ohio State single-game record with a six touchdown pass first-half performance against Florida A&M.

=== Statistics ===
Season	Passing							Rushing			
Season	Comp	Att	Yards	Pct.	TD	Int	QB rating	Att	Yards	Avg	TD
2009	Redshirt										
2010	1	2	5	50.0	0	1	-29.0	4	12	5.3	1
2011	0	0	0	--	0	0	--	0	0	--	0
2012	13	23	139	56.5	2	1	127.3	9	32	3.6	0
2013	75	109	749	68.8	14	2	165.2	40	330	8.3	5
Career	89	134	893	66.4	16	4	155.8	53	383	7.2	6

== Professional career ==
After failing to earn a contract with the Buffalo Bills following their mini-camp, Guiton was assigned to the Los Angeles KISS of the Arena Football League. Guiton started his first game for the KISS on July 6, 2014, against the San Jose SaberCats. Guiton was reassigned by the KISS on December 4, 2014.

== Coaching career ==
=== Houston ===
Following his playing career Guiton entered the coaching profession, serving as a graduate assistant at the University of Houston under his former offensive coordinator at Ohio State and Houston head coach, Tom Herman. On December 29, 2016, he followed Herman to the University of Texas, where he served as an offensive quality control assistant in charge of wide receivers. However in April 2017, Guiton returned to Houston as the team’s wide receivers coach.

=== Stephen F. Austin ===
After two seasons with Houston, he was first hired in the offseason by Stephen F. Austin to be their outside wide receivers coach, but was lured to Louisiana Tech to serve in the same role.

=== Louisiana Tech ===
He spent the 2019 season with Louisiana Tech as the team’s wide receivers coach.

=== Colorado State ===
In 2020 he was hired by Colorado State to be their pass game coordinator and wide receivers coach.

=== Arkansas ===
In 2020, Guiton was hired as the Arkansas Razorback's wide receiver's Coach for the 2021 season.

On October 22, 2023 Arkansas head coach Sam Pittman fired offensive coordinator Dan Enos eight games into the season. Guiton was named interim offensive coordinator for the remainder of the 2023 season.

=== Wisconsin ===
In 2024, Guiton was hired by the University of Wisconsin as the team's wide receivers coach. He served under head coach Luke Fickell, who was the co-defensive coordinator at Ohio State when Guiton was playing there.

In 2025, Guiton was named the quarterbacks coach for the Badgers for that season.
